= 1998–99 Sheffield Wednesday F.C. season =

English football club season

Sheffield Wednesday F.C.
1998–99 season
- Chairman: Dave Richards
- Manager: Danny Wilson
- FA Premier League: 12th
- FA Cup: Fifth round
- League Cup: Second round
- Top goalscorer: League: Benito Carbone (8); All: Benito Carbone (9)
- Highest home attendance: 39,475 (vs. Manchester United, FA Premier League)
- Lowest home attendance: 8,921 (vs. Cambridge United, League Cup)
- Average home league attendance: 26,745 (league)

The 1998–99 season was Sheffield Wednesday F.C.'s 132nd season in existence. They competed in the twenty-team FA Premier League, the top tier of English football, finishing twelfth. It was the club's 100th season at their Hillsborough ground.

== Season summary ==
Danny Wilson's return to Hillsborough as manager saw them begin the season among the favourites for relegation of many pundits. But they performed reasonably well throughout the season, being one of just three sides to beat treble winners Manchester United in addition to being one of just four sides to beat second-placed Arsenal, who would finish just one point behind Manchester United. Up to 27 February 1999 – their 3–1 home win over Middlesbrough – they were boasting somewhat inconsistent yet very stable, promising mid-table form: 10th in the table, winning ten, drawing five and losing 11 of their first 26 games with an impressive goal difference of +9 and were looking like good bets for a UEFA Cup slot. However, they couldn't quite keep up the momentum and would lose their next five games which ultimately ended such hopes. However, winning three of their final seven matches ensured that they would finish 12th at the end of a campaign during which they had never faced any serious threat of relegation; a significant improvement to the previous season. The only major concern at the club was a growing mountain of debts which would have been even more of a worry had the Owls suffered relegation. An expensively assembled squad including Paolo Di Canio, Benito Carbone and Wim Jonk failed to live up to the massive wage bill the club was paying and things eventually came to a head when Di Canio was sent off in a match against Arsenal and pushed referee Paul Alcock to the ground on his way off, which resulted in an extended ban of 11 matches and him being fined £10,000.

== Final league table ==
Pos	Team	Pld	W	D	L	GF	GA	GD	Pts	Qualification or relegation
10	Leicester City	38	12	13	13	40	46	−6	49	
11	Tottenham Hotspur	38	11	14	13	47	50	−3	47	Qualification for the UEFA Cup first round (Note: Tottenham Hotspur qualified for the UEFA Cup as League Cup winners.)
12	Sheffield Wednesday	38	13	7	18	41	42	−1	46	
13	Newcastle United	38	11	13	14	48	54	−6	46	Qualification for the UEFA Cup first round (Note: As Manchester United qualified for the Champions League, their UEFA Cup place as FA Cup winners defaulted to Newcastle United, the runners-up.)
14	Everton	38	11	10	17	42	47	−5	43	

Source: Premier League
Rules for classification: 1) points; 2) goal difference; 3) number of goals scored.
Notes:

Results summary

Overall								Home						Away					
Pld	W	D	L	GF	GA	GD	Pts	W	D	L	GF	GA	GD	W	D	L	GF	GA	GD
38	13	7	18	41	42	−1	46	7	5	7	20	15	+5	6	2	11	21	27	−6

Source: 1998–99 FA Premier League table

Results by round

Round	1	2	3	4	5	6	7	8	9	10	11	12	13	14	15	16	17	18	19	20	21	22	23	24	25	26	27	28	29	30	31	32	33	34	35	36	37	38
Ground	H	A	H	A	H	A	H	A	A	H	H	A	A	H	A	H	H	A	H	A	H	A	H	A	A	H	H	A	H	A	H	A	A	H	H	A	H	A
Result	L	W	L	L	W	L	W	L	L	D	D	L	D	W	D	W	W	L	L	L	D	W	L	W	W	W	L	L	L	L	L	W	L	D	D	L	W	W
Position	19	7	12	17	9	13	10	15	16	16	16	16	15	15	16	14	13	14	15	15	15	13	14	14	12	10	11	11	12	13	14	13	14	14	14	14	13	12

Source: 11v11.com: 1998-99 Sheffield Wednesday results
A = Away; H = Home; W = Win; D = Draw; L = Loss

== Results ==
Sheffield Wednesday's score comes first

=== Legend ===
Win	Draw	Loss

=== FA Premier League ===
Date	Opponent	Venue	Result	Attendance	Scorers
15 August 1998	West Ham United	H	0–1	30,236	
22 August 1998	Tottenham Hotspur	A	3–0	32,129	Atherton, Di Canio, Hinchcliffe
29 August 1998	Aston Villa	H	0–1	25,989	
9 September 1998	Derby County	A	0–1	26,209	
12 September 1998	Blackburn Rovers	H	3–0	20,846	Atherton, Hinchcliffe, Di Canio
19 September 1998	Wimbledon	A	1–2	13,163	Di Canio
26 September 1998	Arsenal	H	1–0	27,949	Briscoe
3 October 1998	Middlesbrough	A	0–4	34,163	
18 October 1998	Coventry City	A	0–1	16,006	
24 October 1998	Everton	H	0–0	26,592	
31 October 1998	Southampton	H	0–0	30,078	
8 November 1998	Leeds United	A	1–2	30,012	Booth
14 November 1998	Newcastle United	A	1–1	36,698	Rudi
21 November 1998	Manchester United	H	3–1	39,475	Alexandersson (2), Jonk
28 November 1998	Chelsea	A	1–1	34,451	Booth
7 December 1998	Nottingham Forest	H	3–2	19,321	Alexandersson, Carbone (2)
12 December 1998	Charlton Athletic	H	3–0	26,010	Booth, Carbone, Rudi
19 December 1998	Liverpool	A	0–2	40,003	
26 December 1998	Leicester City	H	0–1	33,513	
28 December 1998	Aston Villa	A	1–2	39,217	Carbone
9 January 1999	Tottenham Hotspur	H	0–0	28,204	
16 January 1999	West Ham United	A	4–0	25,642	Hinchcliffe, Rudi, Humphreys, Carbone (pen)
30 January 1999	Derby County	H	0–1	24,440	
6 February 1999	Leicester City	A	2–0	20,113	Jonk, Carbone
20 February 1999	Blackburn Rovers	A	4–1	24,643	Sonner, Rudi (2), Booth
27 February 1999	Middlesbrough	H	3–1	24,534	Booth (2), Sonner
3 March 1999	Wimbledon	H	1–2	24,116	Thome
9 March 1999	Arsenal	A	0–3	37,792	
13 March 1999	Leeds United	H	0–2	28,142	
20 March 1999	Southampton	A	0–1	15,201	
3 April 1999	Coventry City	H	1–2	28,136	Rudi
5 April 1999	Everton	A	2–1	35,270	Carbone (2)
17 April 1999	Manchester United	A	0–3	55,270	
21 April 1999	Newcastle United	H	1–1	21,545	Scott
25 April 1999	Chelsea	H	0–0	21,652	
1 May 1999	Nottingham Forest	A	0–2	20,480	
8 May 1999	Liverpool	H	1–0	27,383	Cresswell
16 May 1999	Charlton Athletic	A	1–0	20,043	Sonner

=== FA Cup ===
Round	Date	Opponent	Venue	Result	Attendance	Goalscorers
R3	3 January 1999	Norwich City	H	4–1	18,737	Humphreys (2), Rudi, Stefanović
R4	23 January 1999	Stockport County	H	2–0	20,984	Thome, Carbone
R5	13 February 1999	Chelsea	H	0–1	29,410	

=== League Cup ===
Round	Date	Opponent	Venue	Result	Attendance	Goalscorers
R2 1st Leg	16 September 1998	Cambridge United	H	0–1	8,921	
R2 2nd Leg	22 September 1998	Cambridge United	A	1–1 (lost 1–2 on agg)	8,502	Campbell (own goal)

== Players ==
=== First-team squad ===
Squad at end of season

Note: Flags indicate national team as defined under FIFA eligibility rules; some limited exceptions apply. Players may hold more than one non-FIFA nationality.

No.	Pos.	Nation	Player
1	GK	ENG	Kevin Pressman
2	DF	ENG	Peter Atherton (captain)
3	DF	NIR	Ian Nolan (Note: Nolan was born in Liverpool, England, but also qualified to represent Northern Ireland internationally and made his international debut for Northern Ireland in 1996.)
4	MF	NED	Wim Jonk
5	DF	ENG	Jon Newsome
6	DF	ENG	Des Walker
7	FW	ENG	Guy Whittingham
8	FW	ITA	Benito Carbone
10	FW	ENG	Andy Booth
12	MF	SCO	Philip Scott
13	GK	ENG	Matt Clarke
14	FW	ITA	Francesco Sanetti
15	DF	ARG	Juan Cobián
16	MF	ENG	Ritchie Humphreys
17	MF	ENG	Lee Briscoe
18	DF	YUG	Dejan Stefanović
19	MF	ENG	Scott Oakes

No.	Pos.	Nation	Player
20	DF	ENG	Andy Hinchcliffe
21	FW	ENG	Richard Cresswell
22	DF	BRA	Emerson Thome
23	FW	GHA	Junior Agogo
25	MF	NOR	Petter Rudi
26	MF	SWE	Niclas Alexandersson
27	DF	ENG	Earl Barrett
28	MF	IRL	Alan Quinn
29	MF	ENG	Krystof Kotylo
30	FW	ENG	Andrew Douglas
31	MF	IRL	Mark McKeever (Note: McKeever was born in Derry, Northern Ireland, but also qualified to represent the Republic of Ireland internationally and represented them at U-19 and U-21 level.)
32	MF	NIR	Danny Sonner (Note: Sonner was born in Wigan, England, but also qualified to represent Northern Ireland internationally and represented them at B level before making his international debut for Northern Ireland in September 1997.)
33	GK	CZE	Pavel Srníček
34	MF	NIR	Owen Morrison
35	DF	ENG	Steve Haslam
36	MF	ENG	Alex Higgins

=== Left club during season ===
Note: Flags indicate national team as defined under FIFA eligibility rules; some limited exceptions apply. Players may hold more than one non-FIFA nationality.

No.	Pos.	Nation	Player
21	DF	MKD	Goce Sedloski (to Dinamo Zagreb)
11	FW	ITA	Paolo Di Canio (to West Ham United)
12	MF	ENG	Graham Hyde (to Birmingham City)

No.	Pos.	Nation	Player
25	MF	NIR	Jim Magilton (to Ipswich Town)
—	MF	ENG	Mark Platts (to Torquay United)

=== Reserve squad ===
Note: Flags indicate national team as defined under FIFA eligibility rules; some limited exceptions apply. Players may hold more than one non-FIFA nationality.

No.	Pos.	Nation	Player
—	GK	ENG	Stuart Jones
—	DF	ENG	Leigh Bromby
—	DF	IRL	Derek Geary

No.	Pos.	Nation	Player
—	DF	ENG	Kevin Nicholson
—	MF	ENG	Peter Holmes

== Statistics ==
=== Appearances and goals ===
No.	Pos	Nat	Player	Total		FA Premier League		FA Cup		League Cup	
No.	Pos	Nat	Player	Apps	Goals	Apps	Goals	Apps	Goals	Apps	Goals
Goalkeepers
1	GK	(England) ENG	Kevin Pressman	18	0	14+1	0	1	0	2	0
33	GK	(Czech Republic) CZE	Pavel Srníček	26	0	24	0	2	0	0	0
Defenders
2	DF	(England) ENG	Peter Atherton	43	2	38	2	3	0	2	0
5	DF	(England) ENG	Jon Newsome	7	0	2+3	0	0+1	0	1	0
6	DF	(England) ENG	Des Walker	42	0	37	0	3	0	2	0
15	DF	(Argentina) ARG	Juan Cobián	10	0	7+2	0	0	0	1	0
18	DF	(Serbia and Montenegro) SCG	Dejan Stefanović	13	1	8+3	0	2	1	0	0
20	DF	(England) ENG	Andy Hinchcliffe	36	3	32	3	2	0	2	0
22	DF	(Brazil) BRA	Emerson Thome	43	2	38	1	3	1	2	0
27	DF	(England) ENG	Earl Barrett	6	0	0+5	0	0	0	0+1	0
35	DF	(England) ENG	Steve Haslam	2	0	2	0	0	0	0	0
Midfielders
4	MF	(Netherlands) NED	Wim Jonk	43	2	38	2	3	0	2	0
12	MF	(Scotland) SCO	Phillip Scott	4	1	0+4	1	0	0	0	0
16	MF	(England) ENG	Richie Humphreys	21	3	10+9	1	2	2	0	0
17	MF	(England) ENG	Lee Briscoe	19	1	5+11	1	0+2	0	1	0
19	MF	(England) ENG	Scott Oakes	1	0	0+1	0	0	0	0	0
25	MF	(Norway) NOR	Petter Rudi	38	7	33+1	6	3	1	1	0
26	MF	(Sweden) SWE	Niclas Alexandersson	36	3	31+1	3	3	0	0+1	0
28	MF	(Republic of Ireland) IRL	Alan Quinn	1	0	1	0	0	0	0	0
31	MF	(Republic of Ireland) IRL	Mark McKeever	3	0	1+2	0	0	0	0	0
32	MF	(Northern Ireland) NIR	Danny Sonner	29	3	24+2	3	2+1	0	0	0
34	MF	(Northern Ireland) NIR	Owen Morrison	1	0	0+1	0	0	0	0	0
Forwards
7	FW	(England) ENG	Guy Whittingham	3	0	1+1	0	0	0	0+1	0
8	FW	(Italy) ITA	Benito Carbone	36	9	31	8	3	1	2	0
10	FW	(England) ENG	Andy Booth	38	6	34	6	1+1	0	2	0
14	FW	(Italy) ITA	Francesco Sanetti	5	0	0+3	0	0	0	0+2	0
21	FW	(England) ENG	Richard Cresswell	7	1	1+6	1	0	0	0	0
23	FW	(Ghana) GHA	Junior Agogo	2	0	0+1	0	0+1	0	0	0
Players transferred out during the season
11	FW	(Italy) ITA	Paolo Di Canio	8	3	5+1	3	0	0	2	0
12	MF	(England) ENG	Graham Hyde	1	0	0+1	0	0	0	0	0
25	MF	(Northern Ireland) NIR	Jim Magilton	6	0	1+5	0	0	0	0	0

Last updated: 16 May 1999
Source: Competitions

=== Starting 11 ===
Considering starts in all competitions

- GK: #33, (Czech Republic) Pavel Srnicek, 26
- RB: #2, (England) Peter Atherton, 43
- CB: #22, (Brazil) Emerson Thome, 43
- CB: #6, (England) Des Walker, 42
- LB: #20, (England) Andy Hinchcliffe, 36
- RM: #26, (Sweden) Niclas Alexandersson, 34
- CM: #4, (Netherlands) Wim Jonk, 43
- CM: #25, (Norway) Petter Rudi, 37
- LM: #32, (Northern Ireland) Danny Sonner, 26
- CF: #10, (England) Andy Booth, 25
- CF: #8, (Italy) Benito Carbone, 36

== Transfers ==
=== In ===
Date	Pos.	Name	From	Fee
6 August 1998	MF	Wim Jonk	PSV Eindhoven	£2,500,000
11 August 1998	DF	Juan Cobián	Boca Juniors	Undisclosed
14 October 1998	MF	Danny Sonner	Ipswich Town	£75,000
11 November 1998	GK	Pavel Srníček	Consenza	Free
25 March 1999	FW	Richard Cresswell	York City	£950,000
25 March 1999	MF	Philip Scott	St Johnstone	£75,000

=== Out ===
Date	Pos.	Name	To	Fee
27 January 1999	FW	Paolo Di Canio	West Ham United	£1,750,000
5 February 1999	MF	Graham Hyde	Birmingham City	Free
22 March 1999	MF	Jim Magilton	Ipswich Town	£682,500
25 March 1999	MF	Mark Platts	Torquay United	Free

Transfers in: ▼£3,600,000
Transfers out: ▲£2,432,500
Total spending: ▼£1,167,500
