= 1999–2000 Sheffield Wednesday F.C. season =

English football club season

Sheffield Wednesday F.C.
1999–2000 season
- Chairman: Dave Richards; Howard Culley
- Manager: Danny Wilson (until 21 March); Peter Shreeves (caretaker from 21 March)
- FA Premier League: 19th (relegated)
- FA Cup: Fifth round
- League Cup: Fourth round
- Top goalscorer: League: Gilles De Bilde (10); All: Gilles De Bilde (11)
- Highest home attendance: 39,640 (vs. Manchester United, FA Premier League)
- Lowest home attendance: 10,993 (vs. Stoke City, League Cup)
- Average home league attendance: 26,800

The 1999–2000 season was Sheffield Wednesday's 133rd season in existence. They competed in the twenty-team FA Premier League, the top tier of English football. The club finished nineteenth and were relegated from the Premier League for the first time. To date, this is the last season the club have participated in the top-flight.

== Season summary ==
Barring the opening-day 2–1 home defeat to Liverpool, Sheffield Wednesday were in the bottom three all season long. A very poor start to the season saw the club fail to win any of their first nine league games (gaining just one solitary point away to FA Premier League newcomers Bradford City) and an 8–0 hammering at the hands of Newcastle United in September saw most people tip the club as favourites for relegation, and this opinion was further strengthened by their failure to make a substantial improvement as the season went on as they won just once in their first 17 games (twice in their first 20). The cups offered little respite, with the Owls getting to the fourth round of the League Cup before losing to Division One side Bolton Wanderers, while in the FA Cup they needed a replay to beat Wolverhampton Wanderers (albeit the first leg only ended in a draw thanks to a Wolves goal that replays showed had been awarded incorrectly), before suffering a humiliating exit to Division Two side Gillingham.

Despite this, chairman Dave Richards steadfastly refused to sack manager Danny Wilson, and his patience was rewarded with an improved run of form after Christmas, which saw just one defeat in five games. However, the team's form slumped once again after that, and Richards departed to become chairman of the Premier League early in 2000. The remaining directors decided that enough was enough and on 21 March, Wilson's managerial contract was terminated, three days after an appalling 1–0 defeat away to a struggling Watford side who had previously won only once in their previous 20 league games.

Peter Shreeves, who had previously been assistant to Wilson's predecessor, Ron Atkinson, took temporary charge, and kept the Owls in contention for survival right up to the penultimate day of the season. A failure to beat Arsenal confirmed their relegation after nine successive seasons of top division football, but they did manage a 3–3 draw at Highbury. Bradford City manager Paul Jewell was then given the uphill task of restoring Premier League football to the club, though the club's mounting debts triggered fears that further struggles would lie ahead.

== Final league table ==
| Pos | Team | Pld | W | D | L | GF | GA | GD | Pts | Qualification or relegation |
|---|---|---|---|---|---|---|---|---|---|---|
| 16 | Derby County | 38 | 9 | 11 | 18 | 44 | 57 | −13 | 38 | |
| 17 | Bradford City | 38 | 9 | 9 | 20 | 38 | 68 | −30 | 36 | Qualification for the Intertoto Cup second round |
| 18 | Wimbledon (R) | 38 | 7 | 12 | 19 | 46 | 74 | −28 | 33 | Relegation to the Football League First Division |
| 19 | Sheffield Wednesday (R) | 38 | 8 | 7 | 23 | 38 | 70 | −32 | 31 | Relegation to the Football League First Division |
| 20 | Watford (R) | 38 | 6 | 6 | 26 | 35 | 77 | −42 | 24 | Relegation to the Football League First Division |

Source: Premier League
Rules for classification: 1) points; 2) goal difference; 3) number of goals scored.
(R) Relegated

Results summary

| Overall | | | | | | | | Home | | | | | | Away | | | | | |
| Pld | W | D | L | GF | GA | GD | Pts | W | D | L | GF | GA | GD | W | D | L | GF | GA | GD |
|---|---|---|---|---|---|---|---|---|---|---|---|---|---|---|---|---|---|---|---|
| 38 | 8 | 7 | 23 | 38 | 70 | −32 | 31 | 6 | 3 | 10 | 21 | 23 | −2 | 2 | 4 | 13 | 17 | 47 | −30 |

Source: 1999–2000 FA Premier League table

Results by round

| Round | 1 | 2 | 3 | 4 | 5 | 6 | 7 | 8 | 9 | 10 | 11 | 12 | 13 | 14 | 15 | 16 | 17 | 18 | 19 | 20 | 21 | 22 | 23 | 24 | 25 | 26 | 27 | 28 | 29 | 30 | 31 | 32 | 33 | 34 | 35 | 36 | 37 | 38 |
|---|---|---|---|---|---|---|---|---|---|---|---|---|---|---|---|---|---|---|---|---|---|---|---|---|---|---|---|---|---|---|---|---|---|---|---|---|---|---|
| Ground | H | A | A | H | H | A | H | A | A | H | A | H | A | H | A | A | A | H | A | H | H | A | H | A | H | H | A | H | A | A | H | A | H | H | H | A | A | H |
| Result | L | L | D | L | L | L | L | L | L | W | L | D | L | D | L | L | L | W | L | D | W | W | L | D | L | L | D | W | L | L | L | W | W | L | L | L | D | W |
| Position | 14 | 20 | 19 | 20 | 20 | 20 | 20 | 20 | 20 | 20 | 20 | 20 | 20 | 20 | 20 | 20 | 20 | 20 | 20 | 20 | 20 | 19 | 19 | 19 | 19 | 19 | 19 | 19 | 19 | 19 | 19 | 19 | 18 | 18 | 19 | 19 | 19 | 19 |

Source: 11v11.com: 1999-2000 Sheffield Wednesday results
A = Away; H = Home; W = Win; D = Draw; L = Loss

== Results ==
Sheffield Wednesday's score comes first

=== Legend ===
| Win | Draw | Loss |

=== FA Premier League ===
| Date | Opponent | Venue | Result | Attendance | Scorers |
|---|---|---|---|---|---|
| 7 August 1999 | Liverpool | H | 1–2 | 34,853 | Carbone |
| 11 August 1999 | Manchester United | A | 0–4 | 54,941 | |
| 14 August 1999 | Bradford City | A | 1–1 | 18,276 | Dreyer (own goal) |
| 21 August 1999 | Tottenham Hotspur | H | 1–2 | 24,027 | Carbone (pen) |
| 25 August 1999 | Derby County | H | 0–2 | 20,943 | |
| 28 August 1999 | Southampton | A | 0–2 | 14,815 | |
| 11 September 1999 | Everton | H | 0–2 | 23,539 | |
| 19 September 1999 | Newcastle United | A | 0–8 | 36,619 | |
| 25 September 1999 | Sunderland | A | 0–1 | 41,132 | |
| 2 October 1999 | Wimbledon | H | 5–1 | 18,077 | Jonk, De Bilde (2), Rudi, Sibon |
| 16 October 1999 | Leeds United | A | 0–2 | 39,437 | |
| 23 October 1999 | Coventry City | H | 0–0 | 23,296 | |
| 30 October 1999 | Leicester City | A | 0–3 | 19,046 | |
| 6 November 1999 | Watford | H | 2–2 | 21,658 | De Bilde (2, 1 pen) |
| 21 November 1999 | West Ham United | A | 3–4 | 23,015 | Rudi, Jonk, Booth |
| 5 December 1999 | Liverpool | A | 1–4 | 42,517 | Alexandersson |
| 18 December 1999 | Aston Villa | A | 1–2 | 23,885 | De Bilde (pen) |
| 26 December 1999 | Middlesbrough | H | 1–0 | 28,531 | Atherton |
| 29 December 1999 | Chelsea | A | 0–3 | 32,938 | |
| 3 January 2000 | Arsenal | H | 1–1 | 26,155 | Sibon |
| 15 January 2000 | Bradford City | H | 2–0 | 24,682 | Alexandersson, O'Brien (own goal) |
| 22 January 2000 | Tottenham Hotspur | A | 1–0 | 35,897 | Alexandersson |
| 2 February 2000 | Manchester United | H | 0–1 | 39,640 | |
| 5 February 2000 | Derby County | A | 3–3 | 30,100 | De Bilde, Sibon, Donnelly |
| 12 February 2000 | Southampton | H | 0–1 | 23,470 | |
| 26 February 2000 | Newcastle United | H | 0–2 | 29,212 | |
| 4 March 2000 | Everton | A | 1–1 | 32,020 | Quinn |
| 11 March 2000 | West Ham United | H | 3–1 | 21,147 | Cresswell, Hinchcliffe, Alexandersson |
| 18 March 2000 | Watford | A | 0–1 | 15,840 | |
| 25 March 2000 | Middlesbrough | A | 0–1 | 32,748 | |
| 5 April 2000 | Aston Villa | H | 0–1 | 18,136 | |
| 12 April 2000 | Wimbledon | A | 2–0 | 8,248 | De Bilde, Sibon |
| 15 April 2000 | Chelsea | H | 1–0 | 21,743 | Jonk (pen) |
| 22 April 2000 | Sunderland | H | 0–2 | 28,072 | |
| 30 April 2000 | Leeds United | H | 0–3 | 23,416 | |
| 6 May 2000 | Coventry City | A | 1–4 | 19,921 | De Bilde |
| 9 May 2000 | Arsenal | A | 3–3 | 37,271 | Sibon, De Bilde, Quinn |
| 14 May 2000 | Leicester City | H | 4–0 | 21,656 | Quinn, Booth, Alexandersson, De Bilde |

=== FA Cup ===
| Round | Date | Opponent | Venue | Result | Attendance | Goalscorers |
|---|---|---|---|---|---|---|
| R3 | 11 December 1999 | Bristol City | H | 1–0 | 11,644 | Booth |
| R4 | 8 January 2000 | Wolverhampton Wanderers | H | 1–1 | 18,506 | Alexandersson |
| R4R | 18 January 2000 | Wolverhampton Wanderers | A | 0–0 (won 4–3 on pens) | 25,201 | |
| R5 | 29 January 2000 | Gillingham | A | 1–3 | 10,130 | Sibon |

=== League Cup ===
| Round | Date | Opponent | Venue | Result | Attendance | Goalscorers |
|---|---|---|---|---|---|---|
| R2 1st Leg | 14 September 1999 | Stoke City | A | 0–0 | 9,313 | |
| R2 2nd Leg | 22 September 1999 | Stoke City | H | 3–1 (won 3–1 on agg) | 10,993 | Alexandersson (2), De Bilde |
| R3 | 13 October 1999 | Nottingham Forest | H | 4–1 | 15,524 | Cresswell, Booth, Sonner, Rudi |
| R4 | 30 November 1999 | Bolton Wanderers | A | 0–1 | 12,543 | |

== Players ==
=== First-team squad ===
Squad at end of season

Note: Flags indicate national team as defined under FIFA eligibility rules; some limited exceptions apply. Players may hold more than one non-FIFA nationality.

| No. | Pos. | Nation | Player |
|---|---|---|---|
| 1 | GK | ENG | Kevin Pressman |
| 2 | DF | ENG | Peter Atherton |
| 3 | DF | ENG | Andy Hinchcliffe |
| 4 | MF | NED | Wim Jonk |
| 6 | DF | ENG | Des Walker |
| 7 | MF | NIR | Danny Sonner (Note: Sonner was born in Wigan, England, but also qualified to represent Northern Ireland internationally and represented them at B level before making his international debut for Northern Ireland in September 1997.) |
| 9 | FW | NED | Gerald Sibon |
| 10 | FW | ENG | Andy Booth |
| 11 | MF | SCO | Phil O'Donnell |
| 12 | FW | ENG | Richard Cresswell |
| 13 | GK | ENG | Barry Richardson (on loan from Lincoln City) |
| 14 | MF | NOR | Petter Rudi |
| 15 | MF | SCO | Philip Scott |
| 16 | MF | SWE | Niclas Alexandersson |
| 17 | DF | NIR | Ian Nolan (Note: Nolan was born in Liverpool, England, but also qualified to represent Northern Ireland internationally and made his international debut for Northern Ireland in 1996.) |
| 18 | MF | SCO | Simon Donnelly |
| 19 | DF | ENG | Jon Newsome |
| 20 | FW | ENG | Ritchie Humphreys |

| No. | Pos. | Nation | Player |
|---|---|---|---|
| 21 | MF | ENG | Lee Briscoe |
| 22 | DF | ENG | Steve Haslam |
| 23 | FW | BEL | Gilles De Bilde |
| 24 | MF | IRL | Mark McKeever (Note: McKeever was born in Derry, Northern Ireland, but also qualified to represent the Republic of Ireland internationally and represented them at U-19 and U-21 level.) |
| 25 | MF | ENG | Scott Oakes |
| 26 | MF | WAL | Barry Horne |
| 27 | DF | ENG | Earl Barrett |
| 28 | GK | CZE | Pavel Srníček |
| 29 | MF | ENG | Matt Hamshaw |
| 30 | DF | IRL | Derek Geary |
| 32 | FW | NIR | Owen Morrison |
| 33 | MF | IRL | Alan Quinn |
| 34 | MF | ENG | Alex Higgins |
| 35 | MF | ENG | Peter Holmes |
| 36 | MF | ENG | Tony Crane |
| 37 | DF | ENG | Tom Staniforth |
| 38 | DF | ENG | Kevin Nicholson |

=== Left club during season ===
Note: Flags indicate national team as defined under FIFA eligibility rules; some limited exceptions apply. Players may hold more than one non-FIFA nationality.

| No. | Pos. | Nation | Player |
|---|---|---|---|
| 5 | DF | BRA | Emerson Thome (to Chelsea) |
| 8 | FW | ITA | Benito Carbone (to Aston Villa) |

| No. | Pos. | Nation | Player |
|---|---|---|---|
| 31 | FW | GHA | Junior Agogo (released) |

=== Reserve squad ===
Note: Flags indicate national team as defined under FIFA eligibility rules; some limited exceptions apply. Players may hold more than one non-FIFA nationality.

| No. | Pos. | Nation | Player |
|---|---|---|---|
| — | GK | ENG | Stuart Jones |
| — | DF | ENG | Scott Bettney |
| — | DF | ENG | Leigh Bromby |
| — | MF | IRL | Dean Brennan |
| — | MF | ENG | John Hibbins |

| No. | Pos. | Nation | Player |
|---|---|---|---|
| — | MF | ENG | Nathan Hallam |
| — | MF | ENG | Peter Holmes |
| — | FW | ENG | James Coubrough |
| — | FW | ENG | John Hutton |
| — | FW | ENG | Andy Douglas |

== Transfers ==
=== In ===
| Date | Pos. | Name | From | Fee |
|---|---|---|---|---|
| 29 June 1999 | MF | Phil O'Donnell | Celtic | Free transfer |
| 29 June 1999 | MF | Simon Donnelly | Celtic | Free transfer |
| 10 July 1999 | FW | Gerald Sibon | Ajax | £2,000,000 |
| 10 July 1999 | FW | Gilles De Bilde | PSV Eindhoven | £3,000,000 |
| 23 March 2000 | MF | Barry Horne | Huddersfield Town | Non-contract |

=== Out ===
| Date | Pos. | Name | To | Fee |
|---|---|---|---|---|
| 15 June 1999 | MF | Krystof Kotylo | Nuneaton Borough | Free transfer |
| 22 June 1999 | GK | Matt Clarke | Bradford City | Free transfer |
| 1 July 1999 | DF | Juan Cobián | Charlton Athletic | Signed |
| 13 July 1999 | FW | Guy Whittingham | Portsmouth | Free transfer |
| 20 October 1999 | FW | Benito Carbone | Aston Villa | £805,000 |
| 23 December 1999 | DF | Emerson Thome | Chelsea | £2,700,000 |
| 26 January 2000 | FW | Junior Agogo | Free agent | Released |
| 9 March 2000 | GK | Stuart Jones | Torquay United | £30,000 |

Transfers in: ▼£5,000,000
Transfers out: ▲£2,730,000
Total spending: ▼£2,270,000

== Statistics ==
=== Appearances and goals ===
As of 14 May 2000
Players with no appearances not included in the list

| No. | Pos | Nat | Player | Total | | FA Premier League | | FA Cup | | League Cup | |
| No. | Pos | Nat | Player | Apps | Goals | Apps | Goals | Apps | Goals | Apps | Goals |
|---|---|---|---|---|---|---|---|---|---|---|---|
| 1 | GK | (England) ENG | Kevin Pressman | 21 | 0 | 18+1 | 0 | 0 | 0 | 2 | 0 |
| 2 | DF | (England) ENG | Peter Atherton | 42 | 1 | 35 | 1 | 4 | 0 | 3 | 0 |
| 3 | DF | (England) ENG | Andy Hinchcliffe | 35 | 1 | 29 | 1 | 4 | 0 | 2 | 0 |
| 4 | MF | (Netherlands) NED | Wim Jonk | 36 | 3 | 29+1 | 3 | 4 | 0 | 2 | 0 |
| 6 | DF | (England) ENG | Des Walker | 45 | 0 | 37 | 0 | 4 | 0 | 4 | 0 |
| 7 | MF | (Northern Ireland) NIR | Danny Sonner | 34 | 1 | 18+9 | 0 | 2+1 | 0 | 3+1 | 1 |
| 9 | FW | (Netherlands) NED | Gerald Sibon | 34 | 6 | 12+16 | 5 | 3+1 | 1 | 1+1 | 0 |
| 10 | FW | (England) ENG | Andy Booth | 28 | 4 | 20+3 | 2 | 1 | 1 | 4 | 1 |
| 11 | MF | (Scotland) SCO | Phil O'Donnell | 1 | 0 | 0+1 | 0 | 0 | 0 | 0 | 0 |
| 12 | FW | (England) ENG | Richard Cresswell | 25 | 2 | 2+18 | 1 | 0+3 | 0 | 1+1 | 1 |
| 14 | MF | (Norway) NOR | Petter Rudi | 25 | 3 | 18+2 | 2 | 0+1 | 0 | 4 | 1 |
| 15 | MF | (Scotland) SCO | Philip Scott | 7 | 0 | 2+3 | 0 | 1+1 | 0 | 0 | 0 |
| 16 | MF | (Sweden) SWE | Niclas Alexandersson | 44 | 8 | 37 | 5 | 3 | 1 | 4 | 2 |
| 17 | DF | (Northern Ireland) NIR | Ian Nolan | 37 | 0 | 28+1 | 0 | 4 | 0 | 3+1 | 0 |
| 18 | MF | (Scotland) SCO | Simon Donnelly | 18 | 1 | 3+9 | 1 | 0+3 | 0 | 1+2 | 0 |
| 19 | DF | (England) ENG | Jon Newsome | 6 | 0 | 5+1 | 0 | 0 | 0 | 0 | 0 |
| 21 | MF | (England) ENG | Lee Briscoe | 19 | 0 | 7+9 | 0 | 0 | 0 | 2+1 | 0 |
| 22 | DF | (England) ENG | Steve Haslam | 27 | 0 | 16+7 | 0 | 3 | 0 | 0+1 | 0 |
| 23 | FW | (Belgium) BEL | Gilles De Bilde | 45 | 11 | 37+1 | 10 | 4 | 0 | 3 | 1 |
| 24 | MF | (Republic of Ireland) IRL | Mark McKeever | 4 | 0 | 1+1 | 0 | 0+1 | 0 | 0+1 | 0 |
| 26 | MF | (Wales) WAL | Barry Horne | 7 | 0 | 7 | 0 | 0 | 0 | 0 | 0 |
| 28 | GK | (Czech Republic) CZE | Pavel Srníček | 26 | 0 | 20 | 0 | 4 | 0 | 2 | 0 |
| 33 | MF | (Republic of Ireland) IRL | Alan Quinn | 22 | 3 | 18+1 | 3 | 2+1 | 0 | 0 | 0 |
Players featured for club who have left:
| 5 | DF | (Brazil) BRA | Emerson Thome (to Chelsea) | 22 | 0 | 16+1 | 0 | 1 | 0 | 3+1 | 0 |
| 8 | FW | (Italy) ITA | Benito Carbone (to Aston Villa) | 8 | 2 | 3+4 | 2 | 0 | 0 | 0+1 | 0 |

=== Disciplinary record ===
As of 14 May 2000

| No. | Pos. | Name | FA Premier League | | FA Cup | | League Cup | | Total | |
| No. | Pos. | Name | Yellow card | Red card | Yellow card | Red card | Yellow card | Red card | Yellow card | Red card |
|---|---|---|---|---|---|---|---|---|---|---|
| 1 | GK | Kevin Pressman | 1 | 0 | 0 | 0 | 0 | 0 | 1 | 0 |
| 2 | DF | Peter Atherton | 5 | 0 | 0 | 0 | 0 | 0 | 5 | 0 |
| 4 | MF | Wim Jonk | 4 | 0 | 0 | 0 | 0 | 0 | 4 | 0 |
| 5 | DF | Emerson Thome | 3 | 0 | 0 | 0 | 0 | 0 | 3 | 0 |
| 7 | MF | Danny Sonner | 4 | 1 | 1 | 0 | 0 | 0 | 5 | 1 |
| 9 | FW | Gerald Sibon | 2 | 0 | 1 | 0 | 0 | 0 | 3 | 0 |
| 10 | FW | Andy Booth | 3 | 0 | 0 | 0 | 0 | 0 | 3 | 0 |
| 11 | MF | Phil O'Donnell | 1 | 0 | 0 | 0 | 0 | 0 | 1 | 0 |
| 12 | FW | Richard Cresswell | 3 | 0 | 0 | 0 | 0 | 0 | 3 | 0 |
| 14 | MF | Petter Rudi | 2 | 0 | 0 | 0 | 0 | 0 | 2 | 0 |
| 15 | MF | Philip Scott | 1 | 0 | 0 | 0 | 0 | 0 | 1 | 0 |
| 16 | MF | Niclas Alexandersson | 2 | 0 | 1 | 0 | 0 | 0 | 3 | 0 |
| 17 | DF | Ian Nolan | 4 | 0 | 0 | 0 | 0 | 0 | 4 | 0 |
| 18 | MF | Simon Donnelly | 2 | 0 | 0 | 0 | 0 | 0 | 2 | 0 |
| 19 | DF | Jon Newsome | 1 | 0 | 0 | 0 | 0 | 0 | 1 | 0 |
| 21 | MF | Lee Briscoe | 1 | 0 | 0 | 0 | 1 | 0 | 2 | 0 |
| 23 | FW | Gilles De Bilde | 3 | 0 | 0 | 0 | 1 | 0 | 4 | 0 |
| 33 | MF | Alan Quinn | 3 | 0 | 1 | 1 | 0 | 0 | 4 | 1 |
| Total | | | 45 | 1 | 4 | 1 | 2 | 0 | 51 | 2 |
