= 1995–96 Sheffield Wednesday F.C. season =

English football club season

Sheffield Wednesday F.C.
1995–96 season
- Chairman: Dave Richards
- Manager: David Pleat
- FA Premier League: 15th
- FA Cup: Third round
- League Cup: Fourth round
- UEFA Intertoto Cup: Group stage
- Top goalscorer: League: David Hirst (13); All: David Hirst (14)
- Highest home attendance: 34,101 vs Manchester United (23 Sep 1995, FA Premier League)
- Lowest home attendance: 12,039 vs Crewe Alexandra (4 Oct 1995, League Cup)
- Average home league attendance: 24,877 (League games only)
Home colours	Away colours

The 1995–96 season was Sheffield Wednesday F.C.'s 129th season. They competed in the twenty-team FA Premier League, the top tier of English football, finishing fifteenth.

== Season summary ==
David Pleat's first season as Sheffield Wednesday manager was the club's worst in the top flight since winning promotion in 1991. The eagerly-anticipated signing of Belgian forward Marc Degryse turned out to be a major disappointment, though David Hirst provided a fair supply of goals on his return to fitness after a two-year injury struggle.

The Owls struggled all season long, and finished 15th in the final table. This was another dismal showing for a club who were chasing honours just two or three seasons earlier, and Pleat knew that something had to change, and set out to reward the club's board for keeping faith in him for a second season.

Marc Degryse, Chris Waddle, Chris Woods and Klas Ingesson all left in the close season, and all the talk at Hillsborough was the acquisition of young striker Andy Booth from Huddersfield Town for £2.5 million. Many fans saw him as the answer to the problems which had plagued the Owls during the last seasons, and gave them hope of a new challenge for honours.

== Final league table ==
Pos	Team	Pld	W	D	L	GF	GA	GD	Pts
13	Leeds United	38	12	7	19	40	57	−17	43
14	Wimbledon	38	10	11	17	55	70	−15	41
15	Sheffield Wednesday	38	10	10	18	48	61	−13	40
16	Coventry City	38	8	14	16	42	60	−18	38
17	Southampton	38	9	11	18	34	52	−18	38

Source: Premier League
Rules for classification: 1) points; 2) goal difference; 3) number of goals scored.

Results summary

Overall								Home						Away					
Pld	W	D	L	GF	GA	GD	Pts	W	D	L	GF	GA	GD	W	D	L	GF	GA	GD
38	10	10	18	48	61	−13	40	7	5	7	30	31	−1	3	5	11	18	30	−12

Source: Statto

Results by round

Round	1	2	3	4	5	6	7	8	9	10	11	12	13	14	15	16	17	18	19	20	21	22	23	24	25	26	27	28	29	30	31	32	33	34	35	36	37	38
Ground	A	H	H	A	A	H	H	A	H	A	H	A	H	A	A	H	A	H	H	A	H	H	A	A	H	H	A	H	A	H	A	A	A	H	A	H	H	A
Result	L	W	L	D	W	L	D	L	L	W	L	D	D	L	D	W	D	W	D	L	W	D	L	L	W	L	L	L	L	W	W	L	L	W	L	D	L	D
Position	17	7	14	12	7	13	12	13	15	12	13	13	14	14	15	14	14	14	14	14	13	13	13	14	13	14	14	14	14	14	14	14	14	14	15	15	15	15

Source: Statto.com
A = Away; H = Home; W = Win; D = Draw; L = Loss

== Results ==
Sheffield Wednesday's score comes first

=== Legend ===
Win	Draw	Loss

=== FA Premier League ===
19 August 1995 1	Liverpool	1–0	Sheffield Wednesday	Liverpool, Merseyside
15:00	Collymore 61'	Report		Stadium: Anfield; Attendance: 40,535; Referee: Paul Durkin

23 August 1995 2	Sheffield Wednesday	2–1	Blackburn Rovers	Sheffield, South Yorkshire
19:45	Waddle 18'; Pembridge 83'	Report	Shearer 60'	Stadium: Hillsborough Stadium; Attendance: 25,544; Referee: Paul Danson

27 August 1995 3	Sheffield Wednesday	0–2	Newcastle United	Sheffield, South Yorkshire
16:00		Report	Ginola 53'; Beardsley 75'	Stadium: Hillsborough Stadium; Attendance: 24,815; Referee: Paul Alcock

30 August 1995 4	Wimbledon	2–2	Sheffield Wednesday	Wimbledon, Greater London
19:45	Goodman 17'; Holdsworth 84' (pen.)	Report	Degryse 10'; Hirst 46'	Stadium: Selhurst Park; Attendance: 6,352; Referee: Alan Wilkie

9 September 1995 5	Queens Park Rangers	0–3	Sheffield Wednesday	Shepherd's Bush, Greater London
15:00		Report	Bright 55', 60'; Donaldson 77'	Stadium: Loftus Road; Attendance: 12,459; Referee: Mike Reed

16 September 1995 6	Sheffield Wednesday	1–3	Tottenham Hotspur	Sheffield, South Yorkshire
15:00	Hirst 8'	Report	Sheringham 32', 65' (pen.); Walker 60' (o.g.)	Stadium: Hillsborough Stadium; Attendance: 26,565; Referee: Dermot Gallagher

23 September 1995 7	Sheffield Wednesday	0–0	Manchester United	Sheffield, South Yorkshire
15:00		Report		Stadium: Hillsborough Stadium; Attendance: 34,101; Referee: Keith Burge

30 September 1995 8	Leeds United	2–0	Sheffield Wednesday	Leeds, West Yorkshire
15:00	Yeboah 34'; Speed 58'	Report		Stadium: Elland Road; Attendance: 34,076; Referee: Graham Poll

15 October 1995 9	Sheffield Wednesday	0–1	Middlesbrough	Sheffield, South Yorkshire
16:00		Report	Hignett 68' (pen.)	Stadium: Hillsborough Stadium; Attendance: 21,177; Referee: Gerald Ashby

21 October 1995 10	Coventry City	0–1	Sheffield Wednesday	Coventry, West Midlands
15:00		Report	Whittingham 16'	Stadium: Highfield Road; Attendance: 13,998; Referee: Jeff Winter

28 October 1995 11	Sheffield Wednesday	0–1	West Ham United	Sheffield, South Yorkshire
15:00		Report	Dowie 40'	Stadium: Hillsborough Stadium; Attendance: 23,917; Referee: Keith Cooper

4 November 1995 12	Chelsea	0–0	Sheffield Wednesday	Fulham, Greater London
15:00		Report		Stadium: Stamford Bridge; Attendance: 23,216; Referee: Paul Danson

18 November 1995 13	Sheffield Wednesday	1–1	Manchester City	Sheffield, South Yorkshire
15:00	Hirst 14' (pen.)	Report	Lomas 55'	Stadium: Hillsborough Stadium; Attendance: 24,422; Referee: Graham Poll

21 November 1995 14	Arsenal	4–2	Sheffield Wednesday	Highbury, Greater London
19:45	Bergkamp 3'; Winterburn 53'; Dickov 64'; Hartson 86'	Report	Hirst 9'; Waddle 20'	Stadium: Arsenal Stadium; Attendance: 34,556; Referee: Roger Dilkes

25 November 1995 15	Everton	2–2	Sheffield Wednesday	Liverpool, Merseyside
15:00	Kanchelskis 45'; Amokachi 52'	Report	Bright 2', 36'	Stadium: Goodison Park; Attendance: 35,898; Referee: Martin Bodenham

4 December 1995 16	Sheffield Wednesday	4–3	Coventry City	Sheffield, South Yorkshire
20:00	Whittingham 25'; Hirst 39'; Degryse 61'; Bright 72'	Report	Dublin 18', 37', 56'	Stadium: Hillsborough Stadium; Attendance: 16,229; Referee: Mike Reed

9 December 1995 17	Manchester United	2–2	Sheffield Wednesday	Old Trafford, Greater Manchester
15:00	Cantona 19', 83'	Report	Bright 59'; Whittingham 78'	Stadium: Old Trafford; Attendance: 41,849; Referee: Peter Jones

16 December 1995 18	Sheffield Wednesday	6–2	Leeds United	Sheffield, South Yorkshire
15:00	Degryse 5', 25'; Whittingham 18'; Bright 67'; Hirst 72', 86'	Report	Brolin 28'; Wallace 86'	Stadium: Hillsborough Stadium; Attendance: 24,573; Referee: Robbie Hart

23 December 1995 19	Sheffield Wednesday	2–2	Southampton	Sheffield, South Yorkshire
15:00	Hirst 14' (pen.), 50' (pen.)	Report	Heaney 7'; Magilton 80' (pen.)	Stadium: Hillsborough Stadium; Attendance: 25,115; Referee: Jeff Winter

26 December 1995 20	Nottingham Forest	1–0	Sheffield Wednesday	West Bridgford, Nottinghamshire
15:00	Lee 5'	Report		Stadium: City Ground; Attendance: 27,810; Referee: Gerald Ashby

1 January 1996 21	Sheffield Wednesday	4–2	Bolton Wanderers	Sheffield, South Yorkshire
15:00	Kovačević 22', 45'; Hirst 54' (pen.), 60'	Report	Ćurčić 51'; Taggart 77'	Stadium: Hillsborough Stadium; Attendance: 24,872; Referee: Paul Durkin

13 January 1996 22	Sheffield Wednesday	1–1	Liverpool	Sheffield, South Yorkshire
15:00	Kovacevic 7'	Report	Rush 87'	Stadium: Hillsborough Stadium; Attendance: 32,747; Referee: David Elleray

20 January 1996 23	Blackburn Rovers	3–0	Sheffield Wednesday	Blackburn, Lancashire
15:00	Shearer 27'; Bohinen 31'; Gallacher 85'	Report		Stadium: Ewood Park; Attendance: 24,732; Referee: Gary Willard

3 February 1996 24	Newcastle United	2–0	Sheffield Wednesday	Newcastle upon Tyne, Tyne and Wear
15:00	Ferdinand 54'; Clark 90'	Report		Stadium: St James' Park; Attendance: 36,567; Referee: Paul Danson

10 February 1996 25	Sheffield Wednesday	2–1	Wimbledon	Sheffield, South Yorkshire
15:00	Degryse 50'; Watts 85'	Report	Gayle 61'	Stadium: Hillsborough Stadium; Attendance: 19,085; Referee: Martin Bodenham

17 February 1996 26	Sheffield Wednesday	1–3	Queens Park Rangers	Sheffield, South Yorkshire
15:00	Hyde 22'	Report	Barker 33', 66'; Goodridge 87'	Stadium: Hillsborough Stadium; Attendance: 22,442; Referee: Paul Durkin

24 February 1996 27	Tottenham Hotspur	1–0	Sheffield Wednesday	Tottenham, Greater London
15:00	Armstrong 32'	Report		Stadium: White Hart Lane; Attendance: 32,047; Referee: Mike Reed

2 March 1996 28	Sheffield Wednesday	1–3	Nottingham Forest	Sheffield, South Yorkshire
15:00	Kovacevic 50'	Report	Howe 10'; McGregor 46'; Roy 80'	Stadium: Hillsborough Stadium; Attendance: 21,930; Referee: Graham Poll

6 March 1996 29	Aston Villa	3–2	Sheffield Wednesday	Witton, West Midlands
19:45	Milošević 61', 62'; Townsend 72'	Report	Blinker 8', 63'	Stadium: Villa Park; Attendance: 27,893; Referee: David Elleray

16 March 1996 30	Sheffield Wednesday	2–0	Aston Villa	Sheffield, South Yorkshire
15:00	Whittingham 58'; Hirst 87'	Report		Stadium: Hillsborough Stadium; Attendance: 22,964; Referee: Peter Jones

20 March 1996 31	Southampton	0–1	Sheffield Wednesday	Southampton, Hampshire
19:30		Report	Degryse 1'	Stadium: The Dell; Attendance: 13,216; Referee: Martin Bodenham

23 March 1996 32	Bolton Wanderers	2–1	Sheffield Wednesday	Bolton, Greater Manchester
15:00	Sellars 44'; Ćurčić 52'	Report	Whittingham 37'	Stadium: Burnden Park; Attendance: 18,368; Referee: Jeff Winter

5 April 1996 33	Middlesbrough	3–1	Sheffield Wednesday	Middlesbrough, North Yorkshire
17:45	Fjørtoft 54', 67'; Freestone 71'	Report	Pembridge 55'	Stadium: Riverside Stadium; Attendance: 29,751; Referee: Keith Cooper

8 April 1996 34	Sheffield Wednesday	1–0	Arsenal	Sheffield, South Yorkshire
15:00	Degryse 61'	Report		Stadium: Hillsborough Stadium; Attendance: 24,349; Referee: Steve Dunn

13 April 1996 35	Manchester City	1–0	Sheffield Wednesday	Moss Side, Greater Manchester
15:00	Rösler 65'	Report		Stadium: Maine Road; Attendance: 30,898; Referee: Robbie Hart

17 April 1996 36	Sheffield Wednesday	0–0	Chelsea	Sheffield, South Yorkshire
19:45		Report		Stadium: Hillsborough Stadium; Attendance: 25,094; Referee: Gary Willard

27 April 1996 37	Sheffield Wednesday	2–5	Everton	Sheffield, South Yorkshire
15:00	Hirst 9'; Degryse 64'	Report	Amokachi 4'; Ebbrell 10'; Kanchelskis 21', 54', 65'	Stadium: Hillsborough Stadium; Attendance: 32,724; Referee: Mike Reed

5 May 1996 38	West Ham United	1–1	Sheffield Wednesday	Upton Park, Greater London
16:00	Dicks 73'	Report	Newsome 89'	Stadium: Boleyn Ground; Attendance: 23,790; Referee: Roger Dilkes

=== FA Cup ===
6 January 1996 1	Charlton Athletic	2–0	Sheffield Wednesday	Charlton, Greater London
	Grant 6'; Mortimer 36' (pen.)	Report		Stadium: The Valley; Attendance: 13,815; Referee: Alan Wilkie

=== League Cup ===
19 September 1995 1	Crewe Alexandra	2–2	Sheffield Wednesday	Crewe, Cheshire
	Edwards; Edwards		Degryse; Degryse	Stadium: Gresty Road; Attendance: 5,702

4 October 1995 2	Sheffield Wednesday	5–2	Crewe Alexandra	Sheffield, South Yorkshire
	Hirst; Bright; Bright; Bright; Degryse		Lennon; Edwards	Stadium: Hillsborough Stadium; Attendance: 12,039

25 October 1995 3	Millwall	0–2	Sheffield Wednesday	South Bermondsey, London
			Pembridge 16'; Whittingham 64'	Stadium: The Den; Attendance: 12,822; Referee: Paul Durkin

29 November 1995 4	Arsenal	2–1	Sheffield Wednesday	Highbury, Greater London
	Wright 36' (pen.); Hartson 64'		Degryse 16'	Stadium: Arsenal Stadium; Attendance: 35,362; Referee: Keith Burge

=== UEFA Intertoto Cup ===
24 June 1995 1	Basel (Switzerland)	1–0	(England) Sheffield Wednesday	Basel, Basel-Stadt
20:00	Rey 68'			Stadium: St. Jakob Stadium; Attendance: 5,200; Referee: Manuel Schüttengruber (Austria)

8 July 1995 2	Sheffield Wednesday (England)	3–2	(Poland) Górnik Zabrze	Rotherham, South Yorkshire
15:00	Krzętowski 13' (o.g.); Bright 44'; Waddle 53'		Szemoński 30'; Woods 70' (o.g.)	Stadium: Millmoor; Attendance: 5,592

15 July 1995 3	Karlsruher SC (Germany)	1–1	(England) Sheffield Wednesday	Karlsruhe, Baden-Württemberg
16:00	Bilić 5'		Bright 81'	Stadium: Wildparkstadion; Attendance: 12,000; Referee: Pierluigi Collina (Italy)

22 July 1995 4	Sheffield Wednesday (England)	3–1	(Denmark) Aarhus GF	Rotherham, South Yorkshire
15:00	Bright 11', 49'; Petrescu 65'		Jokovic 23'	Stadium: Millmoor; Attendance: 6,990

== Players ==
=== First-team squad ===
Squad at end of season

Note: Flags indicate national team as defined under FIFA eligibility rules; some limited exceptions apply. Players may hold more than one non-FIFA nationality.

No.	Pos.	Nation	Player
1	GK	ENG	Chris Woods
2	DF	ENG	Peter Atherton
3	DF	NIR	Ian Nolan (Note: Nolan was born in Liverpool, England, but also qualified to represent Northern Ireland internationally and made his international debut for Northern Ireland in 1996.)
4	MF	WAL	Mark Pembridge
5	DF	SCO	Steve Nicol
6	DF	ENG	Brian Linighan
7	MF	AUS	Adem Poric (Note: Poric was born in London, England, but also qualified to represent Australia internationally and represented them at U-20 level.)
8	MF	ENG	Chris Waddle
9	FW	ENG	David Hirst
10	FW	ENG	Mark Bright
11	MF	IRL	John Sheridan (Note: Sheridan was born in Stretford, England, but also qualified to represent the Republic of Ireland internationally and represented them at U-21 level before making his international debut for the Republic of Ireland in 1988.)
12	DF	YUG	Dejan Stefanović
13	GK	ENG	Kevin Pressman
14	FW	BEL	Marc Degryse
15	MF	NED	Regi Blinker (Note: Blinker was born in Paramaribo, Suriname, but also qualified to represent the Netherlands internationally and made his international debut for the Netherlands in March 1993.)

No.	Pos.	Nation	Player
16	MF	ENG	Graham Hyde
17	DF	ENG	Des Walker
18	FW	YUG	Darko Kovačević
19	FW	ENG	Guy Whittingham
20	DF	ENG	Jon Newsome
21	MF	WAL	Ryan Jones (Note: Jones was born in Sheffield, England, but also qualified to represent Wales internationally and made his international debut for Wales in May 1994.)
22	DF	ENG	Simon Stewart
23	GK	ENG	Lance Key
25	FW	ENG	Mike Williams
26	FW	ENG	Richard Barker
27	FW	ENG	O'Neill Donaldson
29	MF	ENG	Lee Briscoe
30	FW	ENG	Ritchie Humphreys
31	MF	ENG	Mark Platts

=== Left club during season ===
Note: Flags indicate national team as defined under FIFA eligibility rules; some limited exceptions apply. Players may hold more than one non-FIFA nationality.

No.	Pos.	Nation	Player
5	DF	ROU	Dan Petrescu (to Chelsea)
12	DF	ENG	Andy Pearce (to Wimbledon)
15	MF	ENG	Andy Sinton (to Tottenham Hotspur)

No.	Pos.	Nation	Player
18	MF	SWE	Klas Ingesson (to Bari)
24	DF	ENG	Julian Watts (to Leicester City)
30	MF	ENG	Matthew Hardwick (to Alfreton Town)

=== Reserve squad ===
Note: Flags indicate national team as defined under FIFA eligibility rules; some limited exceptions apply. Players may hold more than one non-FIFA nationality.

No.	Pos.	Nation	Player
—	DF	ENG	David Faulkner
—	DF	ENG	Matthew Daly

No.	Pos.	Nation	Player
—	FW	ENG	Kirk Jackson

== Transfers ==
=== In ===
Date	Pos	Name	From	Fee
19 July 1995	MF	Mark Pembridge	Derby County	£900,000
19 July 1995	FW	Marc Degryse	Anderlecht	£1,500,000
25 November 1995	DF	Steve Nicol	Notts County	Free transfer
22 December 1995	DF	Dejan Stefanović	Red Star Belgrade	£2,000,000
22 December 1995	FW	Darko Kovačević	Red Star Belgrade	£3,000,000
4 March 1996	MF	Regi Blinker	Feyenoord	£275,000
16 March 1996	DF	Jon Newsome	Norwich City	£1,500,000

=== Out ===
Date	Pos	Name	To	Fee
1 July 1995	MF	Chris Bart-Williams	Nottingham Forest	£2,500,000
8 November 1995	DF	Dan Petrescu	Chelsea	£2,300,000
15 November 1995	MF	Klas Ingesson	Bari	£900,000
22 November 1995	DF	Andy Pearce	Wimbledon	£600,000
23 January 1996	MF	Andy Sinton	Tottenham Hotspur	£1,500,000
29 March 1996	DF	Julian Watts	Leicester City	£210,000

Transfers in: ▼£6,175,000
Transfers out: ▲£8,010,000
Total spending: ▲£1,835,000
