= Danny Sonner =

English-born Northern Ireland footballer

Personal information
- Full name: Daniel James Sonner
- Date of birth: 9 January 1972 (age 54)
- Place of birth: Wigan, England
- Height: 6 ft 0 in (1.83 m)
- Position: Midfielder

Youth career
- 1990–1991: Wigan Athletic

Senior career*
Years	Team	Apps	(Gls)
1991–1993	Burnley	6	(0)
1992–1993	→ Bury (loan)	5	(3)
1993–1995	FC Erzgebirge Aue	43	(12)
1995–1996	SCB Preußen Köln	21	(3)
1996–1998	Ipswich Town	56	(3)
1998–2000	Sheffield Wednesday	53	(3)
2000–2002	Birmingham City	41	(2)
2002–2003	Walsall	24	(4)
2003–2004	Nottingham Forest	28	(0)
2004–2005	Peterborough United	15	(0)
2005	→ Port Vale (loan)	13	(0)
2005–2007	Port Vale	62	(2)
2007	Walsall	6	(0)
2008	Wrexham	9	(1)
Total		382	(33)

International career
1995–1999	Northern Ireland B	4	(1)
1997–2004	Northern Ireland	13	(0)
- * Club domestic league appearances and goals

Daniel James Sonner (born 9 January 1972) is an English-born former Northern Ireland international footballer. He won 13 caps in a seven-year international career.

A much-travelled midfielder, despite 18 years of professional football, he never spent more than two seasons at any one club. He played for numerous English clubs, predominantly in the Midlands, and also played in Germany. In the latter part of his career, he was easily recognizable due to his iconic long hair. His more notable spells were with Ipswich Town, Sheffield Wednesday, Birmingham City, and Port Vale; he played around fifty games for each club. In all, he played 386 games in the English Football League and more than 42 games in German football. He played in all of the top four divisions of English football, with his greatest honour being a runners-up medal in the League Cup in 2001.

== Club career ==
=== Burnley ===
Starting his professional career with Third Division Wigan Athletic in 1990, Sonner never made a first-team appearance for Bryan Hamilton's side, and so signed with Frank Casper's Fourth Division Burnley in March 1991. After Casper was replaced by Jimmy Mullen, Sonner barely featured at Turf Moor during their table-topping 1991–92 season and so was loaned out to Mike Walsh's Bury, back in the fourth tier, in November 1992, staying for the rest of the season.

=== Germany ===
Making little impact in the English Football League, he packed his bags and moved to Germany for the start of the 1993–94 season, signing with NOFV-Oberliga Süd side FC Erzgebirge Aue. After Aue's promotion he played in the third-tier Regionalliga Nordost for the 1994–95 season. He spent the 1995–96 season with Preußen Köln in the Oberliga Nordrhein.

=== Ipswich Town to Sheffield Wednesday ===
It was whilst at Cologne that he was plucked from obscurity by Ipswich Town manager George Burley. Sonner would spend the 1996–97 season in the English First Division.

In two seasons with the club, he played 56 league games, half of which were substitute appearances. However, he and Burley soon fell out, and Sonner was on the move to Danny Wilson's Sheffield Wednesday in October 1998 for an undisclosed fee, believed to be around £75,000. Once again, Sonner had fallen on his feet, spending the 1998–99 season in the Premier League. He played the club's 8–0 thumping at the hands of Newcastle United at St James' Park on 19 September, and Wednesday suffered relegation at the end of the 1999–2000 season. He was not retained for the following season after failing to agree a new contract and was forced to search for a new club.

=== Birmingham City ===
He soon signed for Birmingham City, where he helped the club to the 2001 League Cup final. In the quarter-finals, he gave his old club some food for thought, scoring a 2–0 victory over the "Owls" on December 12, 2000. In the final he was replaced by Bryan Hughes after 71 minutes and was forced to watch his team lose the penalty shoot-out to Liverpool 5–4, after a 1–1 draw in normal time. In a play-off semi-final defeat at Preston North End's Deepdale, Sonner, teammate Michael Johnson and boss Trevor Francis were all charged with misconduct by the Football Association, Sonner and Johnson were also charged for using abusive language. Sonner was fined £1,000 following a hearing.

Birmingham released him at the end of the 2001–02 season. He played his last game for the club on 7 November 2001. He was sent off 77 minutes into a 1–0 home defeat by West Bromwich Albion after a poor challenge on Phil Gilchrist. Not long after this Steve Bruce was appointed as the club's new manager. Bruce never selected Sonner for a matchday squad, so he played no part in the 2002 play-off final.

=== Walsall ===
After training with Wolverhampton Wanderers, he spent the 2002–03 season with Walsall. He got off to a bad start, wrestling opposition player Tommy Smith to the ground in a 2–0 defeat at Watford, earning a red card and causing manager Colin Lee to brand his behaviour "a disgrace". He managed to recover his reputation, scoring four goals in 28 games. After getting released at the end of the season by the cash-strapped club, he considered a move to Carlisle United, before opting for Nottingham Forest.

=== Nottingham Forest ===
He was with Forest throughout the 2003–04 season, playing 32 games over all competitions. At Forest, a bad miss caused the late Brian Clough to say: "I wish I'd been out there. I scored 250 goals in 271 games and I could have put that in with my you-know-what!" Sonner was keen to stay at the City Ground, but was released by manager Joe Kinnear at the end of the season. Sonner received an offer from Eintracht Frankfurt, a trial at Kidderminster Harriers and an offer from Portadown.

=== Peterborough United to Port Vale ===
Sonner spent the 2004–05 season at League One Peterborough United, then managed by Barry Fry. He spent February to May of that season on loan with Port Vale, making 13 appearances. Impressing during his loan spell, he signed with Vale permanently for the start of the 2005–06 season. A regular under Martin Foyle, he also spent the 2006–07 season at Vale Park, where he and Tony Dinning became the old heads at the centre of the park. Sonner was popular with the fans and played more games for the club than he did for any other club. However, at the age of 35, Sonner rejected Vale's contract offer, claiming that offer was too low paying. He said: "I deserve a rise and a decent offer. The club wants me to play for next to nothing. If they carry on paying Conference wages, then the club is going nowhere. They talk about promotion, but don't want to keep players." Chairman Bill Bratt responded by saying that: "The manager had faith in Danny to pluck him from Peterborough reserves and to offer him another contract with better terms... if he thinks he is on next to nothing he should try working in the pottery industry for 40 hours a week for £200."

=== Later career ===
He moved on to former club Walsall, now led by Richard Money, but due to injury he played just seven games of the 2007–08 season before leaving the club in September 2007. In January 2008, Sonner and fellow "Saddlers" teammate, Paul Hall both joined League Two strugglers Wrexham. He was released by manager Brian Little in May 2008, following the club's relegation to the Conference. Sonner scored once during his spell at Wrexham, his goal coming in a 2–2 draw with Morecambe on 29 January 2008.

== International career ==
Sonner has represented Northern Ireland 13 times. Between 1995 and 1999 he also earned four Northern Ireland B caps, scoring one goal.

He earned his first cap on 10 September 1997 in a 1–0 defeat to Albania in Zürich. His second cap came in a 3–0 home loss to Germany on 27 March 1999 in a Euro 2000 qualifier. His remaining caps were all friendlies. His first start for Northern Ireland came in Belfast on 26 April 2000, his sixth cap – the Northern Irish beat the Hungarians 1–0.

After three years away from the international scene, he was recalled in February 2004. He played six games in 2004 after being recalled, his last one coming in a goalless draw with Switzerland on 18 August.

== Style of play ==
Sonner was a midfielder with long hair, a languid playing style, excellent vision and passing skills.

== Coaching career ==
Sonner joined Savannah United (based in Savannah, Georgia) as a staff coach in August 2015.

== Career statistics ==
=== Club level ===
Appearances and goals by club, season and competition
Club	Season	League			FA Cup		League Cup		Other		Total	
Club	Season	Division	Apps	Goals	Apps	Goals	Apps	Goals	Apps	Goals	Apps	Goals
Burnley	1991–92	Fourth Division	6	0	0	0	1	1	2	1	9	2
Burnley	1992–93	Third Division	0	0	0	0	0	0	0	0	0	0
Burnley	Total		6	0	0	0	1	1	2	1	9	2
Bury (loan)	1992–93	Third Division	5	3	3	0	0	0	2	1	10	4
FC Erzgebirge Aue	1993–94	NOFV-Oberliga Süd	22	6	—		—		0	0	22	6
FC Erzgebirge Aue	1994–95	Regionalliga Nordost	21	6 (Note: Sonner's profile page at bsg-wismut-aue.de gives him four goals for 1994–95, but individual match reports on that site give him six.)	—		—		1 (Note: Appearance(s) in the Saxony Cup.)	0	22	6
FC Erzgebirge Aue	Total		43	12	—		—		1	0	44	12
Preußen Köln	1995–96	Oberliga Nordrhein	21	3	—		—		0	0	21	3
Ipswich Town	1996–97	First Division	29	2	1	0	6	1	1	0	37	3
Ipswich Town	1997–98	First Division	23	1	1	0	2	0	1 (Note: Appearance(s) in the play-offs.)	0	27	1
Ipswich Town	1998–99	First Division	4	0	0	0	2	0	0	0	6	0
Ipswich Town	Total		56	3	2	0	10	1	2	0	70	3
Sheffield Wednesday	1998–99	Premier League	26	3	3	0	0	0	—		29	3
Sheffield Wednesday	1999–2000	Premier League	27	0	3	0	4	1	0	0	34	1
Sheffield Wednesday	Total		53	3	6	0	4	1	0	0	63	4
Birmingham City	2000–01	First Division	26	1	1	0	9	1	2	0	38	2
Birmingham City	2001–02	First Division	15	1	0	0	3	0	0	0	18	1
Birmingham City	Total		41	2	1	0	12	1	2	0	56	3
Walsall	2002–03	First Division	24	4	2	0	2	0	—		28	4
Nottingham Forest	2003–04	First Division	28	0	1	0	3	0	—		32	0
Peterborough United	2004–05	League One	15	0	0	0	1	0	1 (Note: Appearance(s) in the EFL Trophy.)	0	17	0
Port Vale	2004–05	League One	13	0	—		—		—		13	0
Port Vale	2005–06	League One	29	1	2	0	1	0	1	0	33	1
Port Vale	2006–07	League One	33	1	2	0	4	0	1	0	40	1
Port Vale	Total		75	2	4	0	5	0	2	0	86	2
Walsall	2007–08	League One	6	0	0	0	1	0	0	0	7	0
Wrexham	2007–08	League Two	9	1	0	0	0	0	0	0	9	1
Career total			382	33	19	0	39	4	12	2	452	39

=== International level ===
Northern Ireland national team
Year	Apps	Goals
1997	1	0
1999	2	0
2000	3	0
2001	1	0
2004	6	0
Total	13	0

== Honours ==
Burnley

- Football League Fourth Division: 1991–92

Birmingham City

- Football League Cup runner-up: 2000–01
