= Sammy McCrory =

Northern Irish footballer

Personal information
- Full name: Samuel McKee McCrory
- Date of birth: 11 October 1924
- Place of birth: Belfast, Northern Ireland
- Date of death: 4 May 2011 (aged 86)
- Place of death: Donaghadee, Northern Ireland
- Height: 5 ft 8 1/2 in (1.74 m)
- Position: Inside forward

Senior career*
Years	Team	Apps	(Gls)
1944–1946	Linfield	41	(28)
1946–1949	Swansea Town	103	(46)
1949–1952	Ipswich Town	97	(39)
1952–1955	Plymouth Argyle	50	(11)
1955–1960	Southend United	205	(91)
1960–1962	Cambridge United		
1962–1963	Crusaders	17	(10)
Total		515	(226)

International career
1946	Irish League XI	2	(1)
1957	Northern Ireland B	1	(1)
1957	Northern Ireland	1	(1)

Managerial career
- 1962–1963: Crusaders (player-manager)
- * Club domestic league appearances and goals

Samuel McKee McCrory (11 October 1924 – 4 May 2011) was a professional footballer from Northern Ireland, most notably spending five years with Southend United and scoring the first goal at their Roots Hall stadium.

== Club career ==
McCrory was born in Belfast. After turning professional with Irish League side Linfield in 1944, for whom he scored in two consecutive Irish Cup final victories: against rivals Glentoran in 1945 (scoring two) and Distillery in 1946. After scoring 60 goals in 91 games for Linfield he moved to Swansea Town in October 1946. He was relegated in his first season with the club before helping them win the Football League Third Division South in 1949. He also played in the Welsh Cup final in 1949, in which the Swans were defeated 2-0 by Merthyr Tydfil.

He moved to Ipswich Town in March 1950 but did not get off to a great start to his career with the Tractor Boys; he became the first Ipswich player to be sent off in league football in a match against Aldershot in April 1950. However the following season he was their top goalscorer in all competitions, and in total made over 100 appearances for the club.

He then had a spell with Plymouth Argyle but struggled for form in the Second Division, before moving to Southend United in 1955. He scored the first goal at United's new stadium, Roots Hall, on 20 August 1955 against Norwich City. He was also the joint top scorer of the last edition of the Third Division South with 31 goals in the 1957–58 season. After leaving Southend in 1960 he joined Southern League side Cambridge United, where he spent two years before returning home for a one-year spell as player-manager of Irish League side Crusaders.

After retiring, he settled in Donaghadee where he ran a pub, The Port O Call. McCrory died in 2011 at the age of 86.

== International career ==
He earned a cap for Northern Ireland in 1957, scoring in a 3–2 victory over England, and at the age of 33 was at that time the side's oldest post-World War II debutant. He was also part of the 1958 FIFA World Cup squad although he did not feature at the tournament.

== Honours ==
Linfield

- Irish Cup: 1944–45, 1945–46
- Gold Cup: 1944–45

Swansea Town

- Third Division South: 1948–49
