= Alan Quinn =

Irish footballer

Personal information
- Date of birth: 13 June 1979 (age 47)
- Place of birth: Dublin, Ireland
- Position: Midfielder

Youth career
- Cherry Orchard
- Manortown United

Senior career*
Years	Team	Apps	(Gls)
1997–2004	Sheffield Wednesday	157	(16)
2003	→ Sunderland (loan)	6	(0)
2004–2008	Sheffield United	97	(11)
2008–2011	Ipswich Town	69	(3)
2014	Handsworth	6	(0)
Total		335	(30)

International career
2003–2007	Republic of Ireland	8	(0)
- * Club domestic league appearances and goals

Alan Quinn (born 13 June 1979) is an Irish former professional footballer who played as a midfielder.

He is one of nine brothers; both Stephen and Keith were on the books at Alan's former club, Sheffield United while another brother, Gerry, played for St Patrick's Athletic in the League of Ireland, the club which his cousin Joe Redmond also plays for. Quinn also played for Sheffield Wednesday, and is the only player to have scored for both teams in the Steel City derby. During his playing career he also played for Sunderland and Ipswich Town.

== Club career ==
Quinn played youth football in Dublin for Old Church United, Manortown United and Cherry Orchard.

=== Sheffield Wednesday ===
Quinn started his English club career at Sheffield Wednesday, making his first appearance as a substitute during 1997–98 and his first start the following season. After two games in his first two seasons his career took off during 1999–2000 and he eventually played 178 League and Cup games for Wednesday, scoring 17 times.

After six games on loan to Sunderland, and winning OwlsOnline.com player of the year award for the 2002–03 season he moved to Wednesday's rivals Sheffield United on a free transfer in 2004 after no clubs came in with a bid for the out of favour player.

=== Sheffield United ===
After a couple of substitute appearances he made his full debut for the Blades in a 1–0 away victory at Preston North End on 8 August 2004. He scored his first goal for the club a couple of weeks later in a 2–1 home defeat by West Ham United. He was a regular in the starting eleven in his first season at Bramall Lane but in later years Quinn found first team football more difficult to come by.

With the Blades promoted to the Premier League for the 2006–07 season he could not hold down a regular spot, with his younger brother Stephen being preferred ahead of him for a time. Despite that Quinn made 19 Premier League appearances that season and was rewarded in July 2007 with a contract extension until 2010.

Following United's relegation back to the Championship, Alan failed to impress new manager Bryan Robson enough to convince him that he was worth a place in the first team and made only a handful of appearances. The club allowed him to leave for free during the January transfer window, meaning Quinn never commanded a transfer fee throughout his career.

=== Ipswich Town ===
On 18 January 2008, Quinn signed for Ipswich Town on an emergency loan, after an undisclosed fee was agreed. The transfer was made permanent on 23 January 2008, with Quinn signing a three-and-a-half-year contract. He was allocated the number 25 shirt and scored four minutes into his second appearance for Ipswich against his former team Sheffield Wednesday. He also scored a goal in the East Anglian Derby at Portman Road in April 2009.

=== Handsworth ===
In 2014, he signed for Handsworth.

== International career ==
At Youth level he won the 1998 U-18 European Championships with Republic of Ireland in a team that also featured Robbie Keane and Richard Dunne, scoring in the final. the match finished 1–1 AET with Rep. Of Ireland winning on penalties.

Quinn won his first senior cap for the Republic of Ireland against Norway on 30 April 2003 and went on to earn 8 caps.

== Career statistics ==
=== Club ===
Appearances and goals by club, season and competition
Club	Season	League			FA Cup		League Cup		Other		Total	
Club	Season	Division	App	Goals	App	Goals	App	Goals	App	Goals	App	Goals
Sheffield Wednesday	1997–98	Premier League	1	0	0	0	0	0	—		1	0
Sheffield Wednesday	1998–99	Premier League	1	0	0	0	0	0	—		1	0
Sheffield Wednesday	1999–2000	Premier League	19	3	3	0	0	0	—		22	3
Sheffield Wednesday	2000–01	First Division	37	2	2	0	5	1	—		44	3
Sheffield Wednesday	2001–02	First Division	38	2	1	0	6	0	—		45	2
Sheffield Wednesday	2002–03	First Division	37	5	1	0	2	0	—		40	5
Sheffield Wednesday	2003–04	Second Division	24	4	0	0	1	0	2 (Note: Appearances in Football League Trophy)	0	27	4
Sheffield Wednesday	Total		157	16	7	0	14	1	2	0	180	17
Sunderland (loan)	2003–04	First Division	6	0	0	0	0	0	—		6	0
Sheffield United	2004–05	Championship	43	7	2	0	2	0	—		47	7
Sheffield United	2005–06	Championship	27	4	1	0	1	0	—		29	4
Sheffield United	2006–07	Premier League	19	0	1	0	1	0	—		21	0
Sheffield United	2007–08	Championship	8	0	0	0	4	0	—		12	0
Sheffield United	Total		97	11	4	0	8	0	0	0	109	11
Ipswich Town	2007–08	Championship	16	1	0	0	0	0	—		16	1
Ipswich Town	2008–09	Championship	34	2	2	0	3	0	—		29	2
Ipswich Town	2009–10	Championship	19	0	0	0	2	1	—		21	1
Ipswich Town	Total		69	3	2	0	9	1	0	0	80	4
Career total			329	30	13	0	31	2	2	0	375	32

=== International ===
Appearances and goals by national team and year
National team	Year	Apps	Goals
Republic of Ireland	2003	2	0
Republic of Ireland	2004	4	0
Republic of Ireland	2006	1	0
Republic of Ireland	2007	1	0
Total		8	0

== Honours ==
Sheffield United

- Football League Championship runner-up: 2005–06

Individual

- Sheffield Wednesday Player of the Year: 2002–03
