= Dejan Stefanović =

Serbian footballer

Personal information
- Date of birth: 28 October 1974 (age 51)
- Place of birth: Vranje, SFR Yugoslavia
- Position: Defender

Youth career
- Yumco Vranje
- Dinamo Vranje

Senior career*
Years	Team	Apps	(Gls)
1992–1995	Red Star Belgrade	60	(10)
1992	→ Radnički Belgrade (loan)	5	(0)
1995–1999	Sheffield Wednesday	65	(4)
1999–2003	Vitesse	94	(4)
2003–2007	Portsmouth	112	(3)
2007–2008	Fulham	13	(0)
2008–2009	Norwich City	12	(0)
2010–2011	Havant & Waterlooville	0	(0)
Total		361	(21)

International career
1995–2003	Serbia and Montenegro	23	(0)
- * Club domestic league appearances and goals

Dejan Stefanović (Serbian Cyrillic: Дејан Стефановић; born 28 October 1974) is a Serbian former professional footballer, who is the president of the Slovenian footballers and sportsmen union.

As a player he was a defender who notably played in the Premier League for Sheffield Wednesday, Portsmouth and Fulham. He also played for Red Star Belgrade, Radnički Belgrade and Vitesse. He finished his professional career in 2009 whilst with Norwich City, although he briefly signed for non-league club Havant & Waterlooville a year later.

Stefanovic was capped a combined 23 times by Yugoslavia and successor nation Serbia and Montenegro.

== Early life ==
While growing up, Stefanović supported Milan and idolized defender Franco Baresi, which inspired him to become a footballer.

== Club career ==
=== Red Star Belgrade ===
Stefanović began his career in his home town with Dinamo Vranje before being signed by Red Star Belgrade. Whilst at the club he made his international debut for FR Yugoslavia, aged 20, against Hong Kong in January 1995.

=== Sheffield Wednesday ===
During the 1995–96 season, English club Sheffield Wednesday signed Stefanović and his compatriot, striker Darko Kovačević. Stefanović cost the English club £2 million. However, Stefanović struggled to break into the Wednesday side with Emerson Thome and Des Walker among those ahead of him in the pecking order.

In 1998–99, after playing 72 games for the club, Stefanović was released on a free transfer after he failed to make enough first-team appearances to qualify for a work permit extension.

=== Vitesse ===
In August 1999, Stefanović moved to Dutch club Vitesse, joining three of his compatriots: goalkeeper Dragoslav Jevrić, midfielder Nenad Grozdić, and striker Dejan Čurović. Stefanović spent four years at the club, becoming captain during that time. At Vitesse he played 13 UEFA Cup matches.

=== Portsmouth ===
At the start of the 2003–04 season, Stefanović returned to England with Premiership newcomers Portsmouth for £1.85 million. He established himself as a first-choice defender during the club's first season in the top-flight, and was a regular in the 2004–05 campaign, winning the fans' Player of the season award. He was made Portsmouth captain by Alain Perrin in the 2005–06 season, although a dip in form and a habit of speaking out to the press earned him the ire of some supporters. Indeed, he confessed to "not giving 100%" under Perrin due to disliking the French coach, comments criticised as highly unprofessional by some fans.

Stefanović's influence on chairman (and fellow Serbian) Milan Mandarić is said to have been an important factor in the dismissal of Perrin and the re-appointment of Harry Redknapp, and he was an important member of the side that ensured Premiership survival at Wigan in the penultimate game of the season.

Stefanović was converted to a left-back at the start of 2006–07 and was a mainstay of the defence that performed so well for Portsmouth during the season. However, the arrivals of Hermann Hreiðarsson and Sylvain Distin during the summer of 2007 cast his position as a first team regular into doubt and he was replaced as captain by Sol Campbell for the 2007–08 season.

=== Fulham ===
In August 2007, Scottish club Rangers revealed an interest in signing Stefanović but he signed for Fulham.

=== Norwich City ===
Having spent less than a year at Craven Cottage, Stefanović dropped down a division to join Norwich City on 18 July 2008, agreeing a two-year deal.

After twelve starts for the Canaries, during which he picked up one red card, Stefanović ruptured his cruciate knee ligaments and did not play again for Norwich City in the 2008–09 season.

In August 2009, it was reported that Stefanović was in negotiations to leave Norwich, with the player wishing to return to the south of England. On 1 September 2009, his contract was terminated by mutual consent.

=== Havant & Waterlooville ===
Stefanović retired in late 2009 due to a knee injury. He remained living in the Portsmouth area and on one occasion admitted his dreams of managing Portsmouth one day.

On 7 October 2010 Stefanović joined Havant & Waterlooville.

== International career ==
Stefanović is a full Serbia and Montenegro international, earning his first call-up in 1995 (the country was then known as Yugoslavia, changing to Serbia and Montenegro in 2003). He has a total of 23 caps to his name. Stefanović retired from international football in 2004.

== Personal life ==
In September 2006, Stefanović caused controversy when he said that he will throw away his Serbian passport as soon as he gets his British passport as he does not feel like a Serb any longer.

He's now president of the Slovenian footballers and sportsmen union.

== Career statistics ==
Club performance			League		Cup		League Cup		Continental		Total	
Season	Club	League	Apps	Goals	Apps	Goals	Apps	Goals	Apps	Goals	Apps	Goals
FR Yugoslavia			League		FR Yugoslavia Cup		League Cup		Europe		Total	
1992–93	Radnički Belgrade	First League	5	0			—		—		5	0
1992–93	Red Star Belgrade	First League	1	0			—		—		1	0
1993–94	Red Star Belgrade	First League	14	0			—		—		14	0
1994–95	Red Star Belgrade	First League	29	9			—		—		29	9
1995–96	Red Star Belgrade	First League	15	1			—		2	0	17	1
England			League		FA Cup		League Cup		Europe		Total	
1995–96	Sheffield Wednesday	Premier League	6	0	0	0	0	0	0	0	6	0
1996–97	Sheffield Wednesday	Premier League	29	2	1	0	1	0	—		31	2
1997–98	Sheffield Wednesday	Premier League	20	2	0	0	1	0	—		21	2
1998–99	Sheffield Wednesday	Premier League	10	0	2	1	0	0	—		12	1
Netherlands			League		KNVB Cup		League Cup		Europe		Total	
1999–00	Vitesse	Eredivisie	14	0	2	0	—		3	0	19	0
2000–01	Vitesse	Eredivisie	27	1	3	0	—		4	0	34	1
2001–02	Vitesse	Eredivisie	25	3	3	1	—		—		28	4
2002–03	Vitesse	Eredivisie	28	0	1	0	—		6	0	35	0
England			League		FA Cup		League Cup		Europe		Total	
2003–04	Portsmouth	Premier League	32	3	4	0	2	0	—		38	3
2004–05	Portsmouth	Premier League	32	0	2	0	2	0	—		36	0
2005–06	Portsmouth	Premier League	28	0	2	0	1	0	—		31	0
2006–07	Portsmouth	Premier League	20	0	0	0	0	0	—		20	0
2007–08	Fulham	Premier League	13	0	2	0	0	0	—		15	0
2008–09	Norwich City	Championship	12	0	0	0	0	0	—		12	0
Total	FR Yugoslavia		65	10			—		2	0	67	10
Total	England		202	7	13	1	7	0	0	0	222	8
Total	Netherlands		94	4	9	1	—		13	0	116	5
Career total			361	21	22	2	7	0	15	0	405	23

Sporting positions
Preceded by Arjan de Zeeuw	Portsmouth F.C. captain 2005–2007	Succeeded by Sol Campbell
