= Niclas Alexandersson =

Swedish footballer (born 1971)

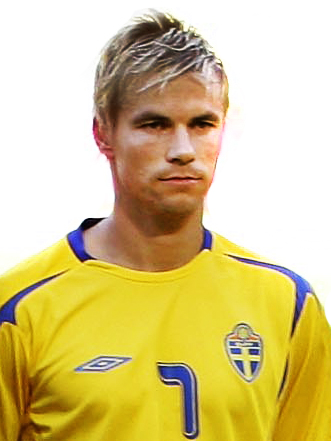
- Alexandersson with Sweden at the 2006 FIFA World Cup in Germany

Personal information
- Full name: Jens Niclas Alexandersson
- Date of birth: 29 December 1971 (age 54)
- Place of birth: Halmstad, Sweden
- Height: 1.81 m (5 ft 11 in)
- Position: Right winger

Youth career
- Vessigebro BK

Senior career*
Years	Team	Apps	(Gls)
1989–1995	Halmstad	157	(29)
1996–1997	IFK Göteborg	52	(13)
1997–2000	Sheffield Wednesday	75	(8)
2000–2004	Everton	58	(4)
2003–2004	→ West Ham United (loan)	8	(0)
2004–2008	IFK Göteborg	119	(18)
2009	IFK Göteborg	5	(1)
2017	Västra Frölunda	1	(0)
Total		475	(73)

International career
1988	Sweden U16	8	(1)
1988–1991	Sweden U18	28	(1)
1991–1993	Sweden U21/O	27	(1)
1996–1997	Sweden B	2	(0)
1993–2008	Sweden	109	(7)
- * Club domestic league appearances and goals

Jens Niclas Alexandersson (Swedish pronunciation: [ˈnɪk.las ˌalɛkˈsan.dɛʂˌsɔn]; born 29 December 1971) is a Swedish former professional footballer who played as a right winger and right back.

Beginning his career with Halmstad in 1989, he went on to represent IFK Göteborg, Sheffield Wednesday, Everton, and West Ham United before retiring in 2009.

A full international between 1993 and 2008, he won 109 caps for the Sweden national team and represented his country at two FIFA World Cups (2002 and 2006) and two UEFA European Championships (2000 and 2008).

== Club career ==
After starting his career with local club Vessigebro, Alexandersson moved to Halmstad in 1988. He played for the team until 1995, when he joined IFK Göteborg, with whom he won Allsvenskan in 1996 and played in the UEFA Champions League. After one year in Gothenburg, he moved on to England, where he was signed for £750,000 by Ron Atkinson for Sheffield Wednesday. He played for three seasons in Sheffield, where he became a fans favourite and won the Player of The Season award the year the team was relegated from the Premier League. After relegation, he was signed by Everton for £2.5 million where he played for from 2000 to 2003, until he moved back to Gothenburg, where he played from 2004 to 2008.

After an initial retirement in 2008, Alexandersson worked at IFK Göteborg's youth academy, Änglagårdskolan. On 27 September 2009, newspapers reported that he was to make a comeback, and would start training again on 29 September 2009. On 2 October 2009, it was revealed that Alexandersson would sign a contract for the rest of the season. After the season, he retired for good.

In 2017, Alexandersson made a brief comeback when appearing in a Division 3 Sydvästra Götaland game for Västra Frölunda against Kungsbacka, appearing as a substitute in the 78th minute and playing alongside his son Noah Alexandersson in a 6–0 win.

== International career ==
Alexandersson made his debut for the Sweden national team in 1993, and participated in 109 international games, scoring seven goals. His participation in the national team includes the 2002 FIFA World Cup, 2006 FIFA World Cup, Euro 2000 and Euro 2008. He was also a member of the Swedish squad that competed at the 1992 Summer Olympics in Barcelona. One of his goals came in Sweden's 1–1 draw against England, which he shot powerfully from outside the box and passed through David Seaman during the group stages of the 2002 World Cup.

The day after Sweden's exit from Euro 2008, he decided that he would retire from the national team alongside Marcus Allbäck, however he also said that if it was needed, due to injuries, he would play for the national team again.

== Personal life ==
Alexandersson was born in Halmstad on 29 December 1971 to father Lennart Alexandersson, a former Halmstad player. He grew up in Falkenberg, where he started playing football in the local club Vessigebro. In 1978, his brother Daniel, who was also a professional football player, was born. In 1988, he moved to Halmstad to play for Halmstads BK. He attended Falkenbergsgymnasieskola 1987-1990.

Alexandersson married his wife Frida. The couple had first child Tilda in 1999 and son named Noah in 2001. While playing football, Alexandersson's family has lived in numerous places including Sheffield, Liverpool, Warrington, and London before returning to Gothenborg. His son Noah has gone on to play professional football for IFK Göteborg in Allsvenskan.

== Career statistics ==
Appearances and goals by national team and year
National team	Year	Apps	Goals
Sweden	1993	1	0
Sweden	1994	2	0
Sweden	1995	8	2
Sweden	1996	6	0
Sweden	1997	12	0
Sweden	1998	0	0
Sweden	1999	10	3
Sweden	2000	8	0
Sweden	2001	8	1
Sweden	2002	12	1
Sweden	2003	1	0
Sweden	2004	4	0
Sweden	2005	11	0
Sweden	2006	13	0
Sweden	2007	7	0
Sweden	2008	6	0
Total		109	7

Scores and results list Sweden's goal tally first, score column indicates score after each Alexandersson goal.

List of international goals scored by Niclas Alexandersson
No.	Date	Venue	Opponent	Score	Result	Competition
1	8 March 1995	Tsirion Athletic Centre, Limassol, Cyprus	Cyprus	3–2	3–3	Friendly
2	15 November 1995	Råsunda Stadium, Solna, Sweden	Turkey	1–0	2–2	UEFA Euro 1996 qualifier
3	10 February 1999	Stade Olympique El-Mensah, Tunis, Tunisia	Tunisia	1–0	1–0	Friendly
4	4 September 1999	Råsunda Stadium, Solna, Sweden	Bulgaria	1–0	1–0	UEFA Euro 2000 qualifier
5	8 September 1999	Josy Barthel Stadion, Luxembourg City, Luxembourg	Luxembourg	1–0	1–0	UEFA Euro 2000 qualifier
6	6 June 2001	Ullevi, Gothenburg, Sweden	Moldova	4–0	6–0	2002 FIFA World Cup qualifier
7	2 June 2002	Saitama Stadium, Saitama, Japan	England	1–1	1–1	2002 FIFA World Cup

== Honours ==
IFK Göteborg

- Allsvenskan: 1996, 2007
- Svenska Cupen: 2008
- Svenska Supercupen: 2008

Individual

- Swedish Midfielder of the Year: 1995
- Sheffield Wednesday Player of the Year: 1999–2000
- Årets Ärkeängel: 2004

== See also ==
- List of men's footballers with 100 or more international caps
