= Des Walker =

English football coach and former player (born 1965)

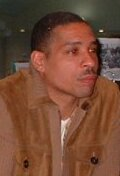
- Walker in 2003

Personal information
- Full name: Desmond Sinclair Walker
- Date of birth: 26 November 1965 (age 60)
- Place of birth: Hackney, England
- Height: 5 ft 11 in (1.80 m)
- Position: Centre-back

Youth career
- 1980–1984: Nottingham Forest

Senior career*
Years	Team	Apps	(Gls)
1984–1992	Nottingham Forest	264	(1)
1992–1993	Sampdoria	30	(0)
1993–2001	Sheffield Wednesday	307	(0)
2002–2005	Nottingham Forest	57	(0)
Total		658	(1)

International career
1985–1988	England U21	7	(0)
1988–1993	England	59	(0)
- * Club domestic league appearances and goals

Desmond Sinclair Walker (born 26 November 1965) is an English football coach and former player who played as a defender.

At club level he played in seven cup finals for Nottingham Forest at Wembley, winning five of them. He was Forest's player of the year three times; on four straight occasions at Forest he was selected for the PFA Team of the Year. At Sheffield Wednesday he picked up another club player of the year accolade. He played in twenty seasons of senior football. All but the last three of those were in the top flight in either England or Italy.

He played 59 times for England, which included the nation's run to the semi-finals of the 1990 FIFA World Cup.

== Club career ==
=== Nottingham Forest ===
Walker was spotted playing locally in London and was signed by Forest in 1980 as an apprentice. He had previously been part of the youth system at Tottenham Hotspur, but was released after a disagreement where he refused to get a haircut. Forest manager Brian Clough, known for giving opportunities to youth players, gave Walker his début in March 1984 at the age of 18. Forest finished third and qualified for the UEFA Cup. In Walker's nine seasons of first team football at Forest, they finished in only three different league positions; third (three times), eighth (four times) and ninth (twice).

In 1987 Walker earned the first of his club player of the year awards at Forest.

Forest won the Football League Centenary Tournament in April 1988 (their first senior trophy since 1981). They finished third in the league in 1988. That form also carried them to the semi-finals of that season's FA Cup with Walker in outstanding form.

Forest won the 1989 Full Members Cup beating Everton 4–3 in the final after extra time. They won a second cup that season, the League Cup with a 3–1 victory at Wembley over Luton Town.

With Forest now chasing a unique cup treble tragedy struck a week after the League Cup triumph. Forest and Liverpool met for a consecutive season in the FA Cup semi-finals. The Hillsborough disaster claimed the lives of 97 Liverpool fans. When the rescheduled game took place Forest struggled as Liverpool won 3–1. Forest finished third in the First Division for a second successive year. However they were unable to compete in the UEFA Cup as English clubs were still banned from European competitions following the Heysel Stadium disaster. Walker was named in the PFA Team of the Year for the first time.

Walker won his second League Cup winner's medal when Forest retained the trophy in 1990 with victory over Oldham Athletic. He earned his second Forest player of the year accolade. He was also selected for the PFA Team of the Year for the second successive season.

Despite English clubs being re-admitted to Europe for the 1990–91 season, places in the competition were initially limited, and 1990 League Cup winners Forest were not included; the only UEFA Cup place that season went to league runners-up Aston Villa. Walker was now aged 25, and despite playing for one of England's most successful clubs, he had not yet been given a chance to prove himself in European competition.

Walker scored an own goal in the 1991 FA Cup Final as Forest lost 2–1 to Tottenham Hotspur. Roy Keane played in central midfield for Forest; years later in his autobiography, Keane admitted he should not have declared himself fit to play as he had not recovered from injury. Yet again Walker missed the chance of playing in Europe. The otherwise excellent consistency of his form earned him a third successive selection for the PFA Team of the Year.

On New Year's Day 1992, Walker scored his only goal in professional football, the equaliser in a 1–1 draw against Luton. That season Forest won the Full Members Cup for a second time beating Southampton 3–2 after extra time. Forest reached another League Cup final but lost to Manchester United. Forest had now played in seven domestic cup finals at Wembley in five seasons, winning five of the finals. Walker signed off from Forest as their player of the year for the third time in six seasons. He also earned a fourth successive selection for the PFA Team of the Year. One other player was selected in the same four PFA Teams of the Year, Walker's teammate Stuart Pearce who earned selection five consecutive seasons.

=== Sampdoria ===
After the Euro 1992 finals, Walker was sold for £1.5 million to Italian side Sampdoria, who were coached by Sven-Göran Eriksson at the time. Sampdoria had been runners-up in the 1992 European Cup Final in the season prior to Walker's arrival, however they finished sixth in Serie A, nor did they win the 1992 Coppa Italia; thus they did not take part in any UEFA competitions in Walker's only season with the team. Although much was expected of Walker upon his arrival in Italy, he endured a difficult season, and did not perform well; moreover, Sampdoria finished the season placed seventh in Serie A, failing once again to qualify for European competitions, and also suffered a second–round elimination in the Coppa Italia. Despite playing 30 of Sampdoria's league games, however, he was largely played out of position at full back. He stayed just one season before returning to England.

=== Sheffield Wednesday ===
Walker joined Sheffield Wednesday for £2.7 million in 1993. He made more than 300 appearances for the club under eight different managers in eight years. He quickly became a favourite of the fans earning their player of the year award at the end of his first season. He also picked up the captain's armband. His time at Sheffield Wednesday brought mixed fortunes, although he played in the overwhelming majority of the club's games following his arrival.

In that first season, Wednesday finished seventh in the Premier League, but were defeated in what was effectively their last chance of silverware in February. They suffered a hefty defeat at the hands of Manchester United in the semi-finals of the League Cup. In 1994–95, Wednesday finished in 13th and 15th in 1995–96. Wednesday were never in any acute danger of relegation on either occasion. In the 1995–96 season, Wednesday played four games in the group stage of the Intertoto Cup.

The 1996–97 season began brilliantly for Wednesday topping the Premier League at the end of August. However they were unable to keep up their excellent form. They finished the season in seventh as they had three seasons before. They also had the best FA Cup run in Walker's time their reaching the last eight. In the next two seasons Wednesday finished 16th and 12th respectively in the top division.

They were then relegated in 1999–2000. Walker played in seven seasons of top-tier football with Wednesday to add to his nine at Forest and one with Sampdoria. In a disappointing 2000–01 season in the 24-team second tier Wednesday finished 17th. Amid Sheffield Wednesday's growing financial strain associated with their fall from the top league, Walker was released from his contract in 2001.

=== Return to Forest ===
He briefly trained with his ex-Forest teammate Nigel Clough at Burton Albion (where he was manager) and a short stint in the US playing for the MetroStars in their 9/11 benefit matches against D.C. United. Forest manager, Paul Hart then asked if Walker could train with Forest, who were now struggling in the second tier of English football. In July 2002, Walker signed for Forest on a permanent basis.

Walker made almost 60 more appearances in his second spell for Forest, and left the club at the age of 38 with a total of 354 appearances and one goal. His final competitive appearance for Forest came against Wigan Athletic on 7 August 2004.

On 16 May 2005, a testimonial match was held in his honour; this drew 13,886 spectators with guest appearances from Stuart Pearce, Ian Wright, Emile Heskey, and Nigel Clough. Controversy was caused when the player was arrested several hours later for being drunk and disorderly. He became first team coach at Forest afterwards but left in January 2005 when Gary Megson was appointed as manager.

== International career ==
Walker made his international debut as a substitute for Tony Adams in a game against Denmark in 1988. It was not long before Walker was a regular starter in the side against competition from Adams, Terry Butcher and Mark Wright.

=== 1990 World Cup ===
At the 1990 FIFA World Cup, Walker started all seven of the games in which England would play, gaining international acclaim. Playing in a three-man defence alongside Wright and Butcher, Walker shrugged off knocks and fatigue to enjoy a superb tournament, which ended when England were knocked out in a penalty shootout by West Germany in the semi-finals. Rob Bagchi, writing for The Guardian in 2010, praised his performances, arguing that Walker's "speed, anticipation and mastery of the fair tackle were reminiscent of Bobby Moore."

=== Euro 1992 ===
Walker subsequently became England's defensive lynchpin after Butcher's retirement, continuing to feature regularly after Graham Taylor had taken over as manager. As an almost ever-present during a period when England played a relatively large number of internationals, Walker became the fastest player in history to reach 50 caps, a feat he accomplished in just over four years from 53 internationals played by England.

Walker travelled with the England squad to the 1992 UEFA European Football Championship in Sweden but England failed to progress beyond the group stages. Walker's trademark excellent defending made him one of the few bright spots of the England performance.

=== 1994 World Cup qualification ===
On 28 April 1993, in a 1994 World Cup qualifier, England were leading 2–1 against the Netherlands. With four minutes remaining the exceptionally-paced Marc Overmars became the first person in Walker's then 52 internationals to beat the defender for speed. With little choice, Walker fouled Overmars. Peter van Vossen scored the resulting penalty and the game ended 2–2.

A month later on 29 May in Chorzów, Poland, Walker was again beaten in a foot race. Dariusz Adamczuk got to the ball first and with one touch lobbed Chris Woods to score.

Four days later, on 2 June 1993, England's hopes of qualifying were dealt a further blow during a 2–0 loss away to Norway. Walker's defensive authority was compromised by Taylor's imposition of an untested wing back system. Walker was largely at fault for the first goal. After committing a foul near the corner flag Walker began to argue with the referee. He was caught out with a quick free kick leading to a cross for Øyvind Leonhardsen to score.

Walker played in a three-game Summer tour of the host nation of the following year's finals, USA. He then missed other crucial qualifiers, a 3–0 win over Poland and a decisive 2–0 loss against the Netherlands in Rotterdam. Walker played in England's last qualifier in the group in November 1993. San Marino scored the fastest ever goal in a World Cup qualifier, after just eight seconds, capitalising on an under hit backpass from Stuart Pearce. England won 7–1 but failed to qualify (they had needed to win by seven clear goals and hope that the Netherlands lost in Poland, but the Netherlands won 3–1 so England's result was academic). This was Taylor's last match in charge of England, and although he was a member of Taylor’s successor (Terry Venables) early squads, he never played for the national team again.

In total, Walker made 59 appearances for England, scoring no goals.

== Playing style ==
Described as a "stopper," Walker was a pacey and hard-tackling central defender, with a good physique and excellent anticipation, who was regarded for the consistently high quality of his defending through the first half of his playing career. Defensively he was among the best markers and timers of the tackle of the television era in English football. His speed allowed him to repeatedly recover difficult situations for his teams. Gary Lineker named Walker in the best One to Eleven that Lineker played beside during his career. Lineker said of him, "Des wasn't the greatest footballer in the world but he was unbelievably quick and had a brilliant defensive mind. Brian Clough used to stick him on me when we played – he always put him man-to-man which was quite unusual in those days – and he used to sing that song 'You'll never beat Des Walker!' – he used to drive you mad when you were playing against him!"

At set pieces for his teams, Walker would stay back to provide defensive cover rather than supplement the attack, reflected in the fact that he only scored once in around 800 senior games.

He played in 20 seasons of senior football, with all but the last three of those in the top flight. He played in seven cup finals with Nottingham Forest at Wembley, winning five. Perhaps a more useful indication of the consistency of his excellence are the individual accolades he collected when at his peak: in the last six seasons of his first spell at Forest he was Player of the Year three times, in the last four of those seasons he was selected for the PFA Team of the Year each time, on his return from his season in Italy he was Sheffield Wednesday's player of the year in his first season there, and following his full international debut in 1988 he became the quickest player to collect 50 full England caps, taking just over four years to do so.

Walker rarely missed matches. He incurred a remarkably low number of bookings during the first 10 years of his career, despite often dispossessing opponents with sliding challenges from all directions. While not being the tallest centre-back he could leap to beat the tallest forwards in the air, and his pace meant even the quickest and most skilful forwards very rarely beat him.

== Personal life ==
Walker was born in England and is of Jamaican descent. His two sons are both professional footballers. The elder son, Tyler, plays for Penybont, while the younger, Lewis, plays for Kidderminster Harriers.

== Career statistics ==
=== Club ===
Appearances and goals by club, season and competition
Club	Season	League			National cup		League cup		Other		Total	
Club	Season	Division	Apps	Goals	Apps	Goals	Apps	Goals	Apps	Goals	Apps	Goals
Nottingham Forest	1983–84	First Division	4	0	0	0	0	0	0	0	4	0
Nottingham Forest	1984–85	First Division	3	0	0	0	0	0	0	0	3	0
Nottingham Forest	1985–86	First Division	39	0	2	0	2	0	—		43	0
Nottingham Forest	1986–87	First Division	41	0	1	0	6	0	—		48	0
Nottingham Forest	1987–88	First Division	35	0	5	0	3	0	1	0	44	0
Nottingham Forest	1988–89	First Division	34	0	5	0	6	0	3	0	48	0
Nottingham Forest	1989–90	First Division	38	0	1	0	10	0	2	0	51	0
Nottingham Forest	1990–91	First Division	37	0	10	0	4	0	2	0	53	0
Nottingham Forest	1991–92	First Division	33	1	4	0	9	0	6	0	52	1
Nottingham Forest	Total		264	1	28	0	40	0	14	0	346	1
Sampdoria	1992–93	Serie A	30	0	2	0	—		—		32	0
Sheffield Wednesday	1993–94	Premier League	42	0	4	0	7	0	—		53	0
Sheffield Wednesday	1994–95	Premier League	38	0	3	0	2	0	—		43	0
Sheffield Wednesday	1995–96	Premier League	36	0	1	0	4	0	3	0	44	0
Sheffield Wednesday	1996–97	Premier League	36	0	4	0	1	0	—		41	0
Sheffield Wednesday	1997–98	Premier League	38	0	3	0	2	0	—		43	0
Sheffield Wednesday	1998–99	Premier League	37	0	3	0	2	0	—		42	0
Sheffield Wednesday	1999–2000	Premier League	37	0	4	0	4	0	—		45	0
Sheffield Wednesday	2000–01	First Division	43	0	2	0	5	0	—		50	0
Sheffield Wednesday	Total		307	0	24	0	27	0	3	0	361	0
Nottingham Forest	2002–03	First Division	31	0	0	0	0	0	2	0	33	0
Nottingham Forest	2003–04	First Division	25	0	2	0	1	0	—		28	0
Nottingham Forest	2004–05	Championship	1	0	0	0	0	0	—		1	0
Nottingham Forest	Total		57	0	2	0	1	0	2	0	62	0
Nottingham Forest	Club total		321	1	30	0	41	0	16	0	408	1
Career total			658	1	54	0	68	0	19	0	801	1

=== International ===
Appearances and goals by national team and year
National team	Year	Apps	Goals
England	1988	2	0
England	1989	11	0
England	1990	15	0
England	1991	10	0
England	1992	12	0
England	1993	9	0
Total		59	0

== Honours ==
Nottingham Forest

- Football League Cup: 1988–89, 1989–90; runner-up: 1991–92
- Full Members' Cup: 1988–89, 1991–92
- Football League Centenary Tournament: 1988
- FA Cup runner-up: 1990–91

Individual

- Nottingham Forest Player of the Season: 1986–87, 1989–90, 1991–92
- PFA Team of the Year: 1988–89 First Division, 1989–90 First Division, 1990–91 First Division, 1991–92 First Division
- Alan Hardaker Trophy: 1990
- Sheffield Wednesday Player of the Season: 1993–94
- PFA Team of the Century (1977–1996): 2007
