= Juan Cobián =

Argentine footballer (born 1975)

Personal information
- Full name: Juan Manuel Cobián
- Date of birth: 11 September 1975 (age 51)
- Place of birth: Buenos Aires, Argentina
- Height: 1.68 m (5 ft 6 in)
- Positions: Right back; midfielder

Youth career
- 1985–1995: Boca Juniors

Senior career*
Years	Team	Apps	(Gls)
1995–1998	Boca Juniors	0	(0)
1997–1998	→ Huracán de Corrientes (loan)	32	(1)
1998–1999	Sheffield Wednesday	9	(0)
1999	Charlton Athletic	0	(0)
1999–2000	Aberdeen	3	(0)
2000–2003	Swindon Town	4	(0)
2003	CD Linares	5	(0)
2004–2006	Club Almagro	4	(0)
Total		57	(1)
- * Club domestic league appearances and goals as of 20:40, 12 June 2007 (UTC)

Juan Manuel Cobián (born 11 September 1975) is a former Argentine footballer who played mostly as a right-back for clubs including Sheffield Wednesday, Swindon Town, Aberdeen and Boca Juniors.

== Career ==
Cobián started his career at Boca Juniors youth side as a central defender and later as a right-back, although he preferred to play as a defensive midfielder. His only first team appearance with Boca Juniors was in January 1997 in a friendly match against São Paulo as a substitute. In the same year, he was loaned to Huracán de Corrientes to play in the 1997–98 Primera B Nacional after the team was relegated from its first and only season ever at the top flight. Cobián scored once in an 8–2 loss to San Martín de San Juan.

With a Spanish passport, Cobián was signed by Sheffield Wednesday in 1998 on a free transfer and made his debut in the opening round of the 1998-99 Premier League playing the 90 minutes against West Ham United, becoming the first Argentinian ever to play in the Premier League alongside Horacio Carbonari, who was at Derby County. He started in seven of the first eight Premier League matches, including a 1–0 win against Arsenal and had his last match as a starter in a 4–0 loss against Middlesbrough. Cobián appeared as a substitute twice in the second half of the season. He also played the whole League Cup match that ended in a 1–0 loss against Cambridge United, then in the Football League Third Division. Early in the game, he played the ball back to goalkeeper Kevin Pressman, who allowed Trevor Benjamin to get the ball and score the winning goal.

He left the club at the end of the season and went on a trial with Charlton Athletic. He signed with the Addicks, but left the team months after signing his contract as he had no playing time. He joined Aberdeen where he played three league matches against Dundee United, St. Johnstone and Hibernian and one Scottish League Cup match, where he went off injured in the first half in en eventual extra-time victory against Rangers. He was promised a new contract if he could recover from his injury and return to the first team.

In 2000, Cobián joined Swindon Town on a free transfer. He made his debut for the Town in the League Cup, in a 1–1 draw with Exeter on 22 August 2000 and his league debut came just four days later in a 4–1 defeat at home to Walsall. However, after Andy King was appointed manager, his first team chances were limited. In 2003, after months struggling to agree a financial settlement with the board and an unsuccessful trial with Boston United, he was released by the club.

After his release, he moved to Spain to play for CD Linares in the Segunda División B but played only a few matches after being sidelined with injury and later surgery. He was released after the end of the season, but his release was considered illegal by the Jaén court which demanded either the player to be reinstated or a financial compensation to be paid to Cobián, with the latter option being agreed.

Cobián returned to Argentina in 2004 and made four appearances before retiring in 2006.
