= Mark Platts (footballer) =

English footballer

Personal information
- Full name: Mark Anthony Platts
- Date of birth: 23 May 1979 (age 47)
- Place of birth: Sheffield, England
- Position: Winger

Senior career*
Years	Team	Apps	(Gls)
1995–1999	Sheffield Wednesday	2	(0)
1999–2000	Torquay United	33	(1)
2000–2001	Worksop Town		
- * Club domestic league appearances and goals

Mark Platts (born 23 May 1979) is an English football midfielder. He represented England as a schoolboy.

Platts began his career as a trainee with Sheffield Wednesday, making his league debut, while still a trainee, on 10 February 1996 as a late substitute for Chris Waddle in Wednesday's 2–1 win against Wimbledon. At the time this made him the youngest ever outfield player to appear for Wednesday, and the third youngest in all behind goalkeepers Peter Fox and Gary Scothern. Two weeks later he came on in the second half for Lee Briscoe in the 1–0 defeat away to Tottenham Hotspur.

He turned professional on 16 October 1996, but failed to appear in the Wednesday first team whilst a professional. He joined Torquay United in March 1999, making his Torquay debut in a goalless draw away to local rivals Plymouth Argyle on 8 March. He played 41 first team games for Torquay, but became increasingly homesick and was released by Torquay in October 2000, when he joined Worksop Town and played alongside Chris Waddle again.

He now works in the steel construction industry.
