= Philip Scott =

Scottish footballer

Personal information
- Full name: Philip Campbell Scott
- Date of birth: 14 November 1974 (age 52)
- Place of birth: Perth, Scotland
- Height: 5 ft 9 in (1.76 m)
- Position: Midfielder

Youth career
- 19??–1991: Scone Thistle

Senior career*
Years	Team	Apps	(Gls)
1991–1999	St Johnstone	134	(27)
1999–2002	Sheffield Wednesday	9	(1)
Total		143	(28)

International career
1994	Scotland U21	4	(0)
- * Club domestic league appearances and goals

Philip John Scott (born 14 November 1974) is a Scottish former professional footballer who played as a midfielder.

After playing junior football for Scone Thistle, Perth-born Scott signed professional terms for Alex Totten's St Johnstone in 1991 after coming through the Perth youth system. Scott established himself as a mainstay in the midfields of John McClelland and Paul Sturrock. Nicknamed Fizzy, he was a member of Sturrock's 1996–97 squad that won promotion to the Scottish Premier Division.

After eight years at McDiarmid Park, Scott moved south to join English club Sheffield Wednesday for a £100,000 fee. Scott made just nine league appearances for the Owls, but scored one goal – an equaliser in a draw against Newcastle. His time at Hillsborough was plagued by injury, and he was released at the end of his contract in April 2002.

Unable to overcome his injury, Scott decided to retire from the game in 2003 at the age of 29.
