= Pavel Srníček =

Czech footballer (1968–2015)

Personal information
- Full name: Pavel Srníček
- Date of birth: 10 March 1968
- Place of birth: Ostrava, Czechoslovakia
- Date of death: 29 December 2015 (aged 47)
- Place of death: Ostrava, Czech Republic
- Height: 1.87 m (6 ft 2 in)
- Position: Goalkeeper

Youth career
- 1977–1982: TJ Viktorie Bohumín
- 1982–1985: TJ ŽD Bohumín
- 1985–1987: Baník Ostrava
- 1987–1988: VTJ Tábor
- 1988–1990: Dukla Prague

Senior career*
Years	Team	Apps	(Gls)
1990–1991	Baník Ostrava	30	(0)
1991–1998	Newcastle United	150	(0)
1998	Baník Ostrava	6	(0)
1998–2000	Sheffield Wednesday	44	(0)
2000–2003	Brescia	32	(0)
2003	Cosenza	9	(0)
2003–2004	Portsmouth	3	(0)
2004	→ West Ham United (loan)	1	(0)
2004	West Ham United	2	(0)
2004–2006	Beira-Mar	63	(0)
2006–2007	Newcastle United	2	(0)
Total		342	(0)

International career
1994–2001	Czech Republic	49	(0)
Medal record
Men's football
Representing Czech Republic
UEFA European Championship
Runner-up	1996 England
FIFA Confederations Cup
Third place	1997 Saudi Arabia
- * Club domestic league appearances and goals

Pavel Srníček (10 March 1968 – 29 December 2015) was a Czech football coach and former professional player who played as a goalkeeper.

In a career that lasted from 1990 to 2007, he notably played in the Premier League mainly for Newcastle United. In addition, he represented Sheffield Wednesday, Portsmouth and West Ham United in England's top flight, and also played in Serie A for Brescia, Serie B with Cosenza, in Portugal for Beira-Mar, and in his native country for Baník Ostrava. After retiring, he worked as a goalkeeping coach for his own private school and for Sparta Prague.

Srníček played internationally for the Czech Republic from 1994 to 2001, earning a total of 49 caps. He was part of their squad that came runners-up at UEFA Euro 1996, and was their first-choice goalkeeper when they came third at the 1997 FIFA Confederations Cup and contested UEFA Euro 2000.

== Club career ==
=== Newcastle United ===
Srníček made 30 appearances in the Czechoslovak First League for Baník Ostrava spanning the 1989–90 and 1990–91 seasons. He was signed for English side Newcastle United in January 1991 by manager Jim Smith for a fee of £350,000, being one of 23 players signed by Smith in a 2 1/2-year period as manager. Smith left just two months after Srníček's arrival. Under manager Ossie Ardiles, Srníček established himself as Newcastle's first-choice goalkeeper ahead of John Burridge and Tommy Wright. Srníček experienced difficulty in the first 15 games of the 1991–92 season, conceding 32 goals in that period including six in a single match against Tranmere Rovers. Ardiles replaced Srníček as goalkeeper with Wright and by February 1992, the club was merely one place from last in the Second Division. This led to Kevin Keegan replacing Ardiles as manager, with the club winning seven of their remaining 16 games, only managing to confirm their future status in the division with an away win against Leicester City on the last day of the season. The club started the 1992–93 season in the new Football League First Division, winning all of their first 11 matches. Wright lost his place as goalkeeper to Srníček after 14 games of the season. At the end of the season, Keegan's first full one as manager, the club was promoted to the Premier League with 96 points. 1993 saw the arrival of Mike Hooper from Liverpool, who competed with Srníček for the position of goalkeeper.

Srníček marked the opening of the 1994–95 season, a 3–1 away victory against Leicester City, by being sent off. A "terrible error" by Srníček in a September 1994 match against Liverpool resulted in a goal for Liverpool striker Ian Rush, ending Newcastle's perfect start to the season and leading Glenn Moore of The Independent to question how much longer the goalkeeper would remain in the first team.

During Srníček's league suspension in 1995, former Reading man Shaka Hislop assumed position as the team's goalkeeper. Later, an injury to Hislop enabled Srníček to return to the first team, upon which he entered into an impressive run of form. He was named man of the match in a December 1995 match against Everton, his team winning 1–0. During the 1990s, Srníček became the longest-serving foreign Newcastle player, passing the time spent at the club by Chilean brothers George and Ted Robledo.

Srníček played in the UEFA Cup, making a "vital save" from Amara Traoré and keeping a clean sheet as Newcastle beat Metz 2–0 in a December 1996 match in Newcastle, to qualify for the quarter finals of the competition.

=== Banik and Sheffield Wednesday ===
Srníček returned to Ostrava in 1998, playing six matches in the Czech First League for Baník.

He had a five-day trial with Sheffield Wednesday in October 1998, joining the club soon afterwards. He made his debut for the club at St James' Park in a 1–1 draw against former team Newcastle, standing in for injured goalkeeper Kevin Pressman. On 18 December 1999, in a league match against Aston Villa Srníček saved two penalties, one from Dion Dublin and one from Paul Merson, however Wednesday still ended up losing 2–1. He played for Wednesday for the last time in March 2000, leaving the club in June 2000 under the Bosman ruling, after the club was relegated from the Premier League.

=== Italy ===
Srníček joined Italian club Brescia in July 2000, signing a three-year contract. During a November 2000 league match against Reggina, Srníček was hit by a firework, which caused a stoppage to the game. Other objects were thrown onto the pitch including flares and sticks on numerous occasions, eventually resulting in the decision by referee Pierluigi Collina to abandon the match.

=== Return to England ===
Srníček joined newly promoted Premier League side Portsmouth on 1 September 2003 on a free transfer, citing former Newcastle goalkeeper Hislop and Czech teammate Patrik Berger as key influences in his decision. He made his debut for the club in a fourth round League Cup match against South Coast Derby rivals Southampton on 3 December, a 2–0 loss, and made his league debut for the club in a 0–0 draw with Middlesbrough three days later.

Having fallen behind Hislop and Harald Wapenaar in the selection, Srníček joined West Ham United in the First Division on a one-month loan deal on 19 February 2004. After making his debut against rivals Millwall as a substitute for Matthew Etherington on 21 March 2004 in a 4–1 defeat, known as the "Mothers' Day Massacre", at The Den, following the sending-off of first-choice goalkeeper, Stephen Bywater, Srníček moved to West Ham on a free transfer, signing a contract until the end of the season. He started two matches in Bywater's absence, against Derby and Crystal Palace, but the team took just one point from the two games. He played no further games for West Ham and left the club at the end of the season.

=== Portugal ===
Srníček spent the summer of 2004 trialling with Coventry City and, later, training with Opava. He subsequently headed to Portuguese club Beira-Mar, for whom he made his debut in September. Beira-Mar finished last in the league and were relegated at the end of the 2004–05 season.

=== Second spell at Newcastle ===
Srníček made a return to Newcastle on 29 September 2006, signing a short-term deal until the end of the year as cover for the injured Shay Given. He returned to the pitch on 23 December, when Newcastle defeated Tottenham Hotspur 3–1. He was brought on for Given, who had pulled his groin in the 87th minute, and received a tremendous reception from the Newcastle crowd as he came on. He featured in Newcastle's match against Bolton Wanderers three days later, making his first start for the club since October 1997. Having made two appearances for Newcastle during his initial three-month period, his contract was extended until the end of the 2006–07 season. He was released by Newcastle in May 2007, having played no further games for the club.

== International career ==
Srníček went to Euro 1996, but was reserve goalkeeper behind Petr Kouba. Following the tournament, he played 15 consecutive matches for his native Czech Republic, establishing himself as first-choice goalkeeper. He was first choice at the 1997 FIFA Confederations Cup, in which the Czechs came third.

Srníček played in all three of the Czech Republic's matches at Euro 2000. He made a number of saves in his team's opening match against the Netherlands, although he was unable to stop a late penalty as Frank De Boer scored the only goal of the game in the 89th minute.

Srníček retired from international football in November 2001, following his nation's failure to qualify for the 2002 FIFA World Cup. He finished his international career with a total of 49 senior appearances between 1994 and 2001.

== Coaching career ==
Srníček began the Srníček school of goalkeeping in Czech Republic offering youngsters from around the world the opportunity to learn from his coaching. He was also involved in a number of charity organisations.

On 4 January 2012, Sparta Prague appointed Srníček to their coaching staff.

== Personal life ==
Srníček was the son of a woodcutter. His working life started with a period of service in the Czechoslovak People's Army. In December 2015, he returned to Tyneside to promote his autobiography, Pavel is a Geordie.

== Death ==
He suffered a cardiac arrest while out jogging on 20 December 2015, and was put into an induced coma at a hospital in his native Ostrava. He died nine days later, when his life support was turned off due to irreversible brain damage. Srníček's funeral was held in his hometown on 4 January 2016, mourners included his Newcastle understudy Steve Harper and Czech teammate Pavel Nedvěd.

== Honours ==
Newcastle United

- Football League First Division: 1992–93

== Bibliography ==
- Srníček, Pavel (2015). Pavel is a Geordie. Mojo Risin' Publishing. ISBN 978-0993442421.
