= Stuart Jones (footballer, born 1977) =

English footballer

Personal information
- Date of birth: 24 October 1977 (age 49)
- Place of birth: Bristol, England
- Position: Goalkeeper

Youth career
- ????–1997: Reading

Senior career*
Years	Team	Apps	(Gls)
1997–1998	Weston-super-Mare	?	(?)
1998–2000	Sheffield Wednesday	0	(0)
1998	→ Crewe Alexandra (loan)	0	(0)
2000	→ Torquay United (loan)	3	(0)
2000–2002	Torquay United	29	(0)
2002	Chester City	?	(?)
2002	Barry Town	1	(0)
2002–2003	Weston-super-Mare	?	(?)
2003–2004	Brighton & Hove Albion	3	(0)
2004–2005	Doncaster Rovers	4	(0)
2005–2006	Accrington Stanley	2	(0)
Total		42	(0)

Managerial career
- 2018–2021: Ashton & Backwell United
- * Club domestic league appearances and goals

Stuart Jones (born 24 October 1977) is an English former professional footballer who played as a goalkeeper.

== Career ==
Born in Bristol, Jones began as a trainee at Reading. He then began his senior career in 1997 with non-league side Weston-super-Mare. Jones moved to the Football League side Sheffield Wednesday in March 1998, but he never made a first team appearance for Wednesday. While at Wednesday, Jones spent loan spells at both Crewe Alexandra (where he did not make a single first-team appearance) his senior career with Torquay United. After a month at Torquay, Jones made his transfer permanent, and spent a further two years at the club. Over both his spells with the club, Jones a total of thirty-two appearances in the Football League for Torquay. Jones then played non-league football for Chester City, and in Wales for Barry Town, where he made one league appearance, before returning to his first club Weston-super-Mare. Jones then returned to English League football, making three appearances for Brighton & Hove Albion during the 2003–2004 season, and four appearances for Doncaster Rovers during the 2004–05 season. Jones later played non-league football for Accrington Stanley, making a further two appearances.

In May 2018, Jones was appointed manager of Western Football League Division One side Ashton & Backwell United. In April 2021, he stepped down from his role at the club.
