= Northern Ireland national football B team =

Secondary football team

Northern Ireland B
- Nickname(s): Green & White Army, Norn Iron
- Association: Irish Football Association
- Head coach: none
- Most caps: Pat McGibbon (5)
- Top scorer: Derek Dougan (3)
- Home stadium: Windsor Park / Mourneview Park / Coleraine Showgrounds
- FIFA code: NIR
First colours	Second colours

First international
- Northern Ireland B 6–0 Romania B (Belfast, Northern Ireland; 23 October 1957)

Biggest win
- Northern Ireland B 6–0 Romania B (Belfast, Northern Ireland; 23 October 1957)

Biggest defeat
- France B 5–0 Northern Ireland B (Annecy, France; 16 March 1960)

The Northern Ireland national football B team is a secondary football team run occasionally as support for the Northern Ireland national football team. Primarily seen as a stepping-stone between the under-21 and full international teams, B team matches are also used to give a run-out for fringe players and to honour Irish League players who would not otherwise gain international recognition.

Matches are rarely played by Northern Ireland at this level due to their limited player pool, necessitating rapid elevation of young players to the 'Full' squad. Matches have been played against other football associations' 'B' teams and against various national "selects".

== History ==
The Northern Ireland 'B' team made its first appearance in 1957, playing against Romania 'B' who were not deemed worthy of a 'Full' international (note: Romania was commonly referred to as Rumania in the English language up until the 1980s). The occasion of October 23, 1957 marked the first use of the Windsor Park floodlights for an international fixture. A one sided match finished 6-0 with a hat-trick from Derek Dougan and further goals from Sammy McCrory, Sammy Chapman and Jackie Scott.

The match against Rumania was followed up with two matches against France B in 1959 and 1960 before Under-23 international matches became de rigueur in the 1960s. The 'B' format re-emerged in the 1990s as national teams focussed on Under-21 rather than Under-23 matches and thus a "stepping stone" from Under-21 to 'Full' was required.

Northern Ireland's most recent match at 'B' level was against Scotland B in May 2009.

== Fixtures ==
None

== Previous matches ==
Performance Record:

P	W	D	L	F	A	Gd
11	4	1	6	16	19	-3

Date	Opponent	Score	Venue	Scorers
23 October 1957	Romania B	6-0	Windsor Park, Belfast	Sammy McCrory, Sammy Chapman, Derek Dougan 3, Jackie Scott
11 November 1959	France B	1-1	Windsor Park, Belfast	Hugh Barr
16 March 1960	France B	0-5	Stade du Coteau, Annecy	
10 May 1994	England B	2-4	Hillsborough Stadium, Sheffield	George O'Boyle, James Quinn
21 February 1995	Scotland B	0-3	Easter Road, Edinburgh	
26 March 1996	Norway Olympic football team	3-0	The Showgrounds, Coleraine	Darren Patterson, James Quinn, Philip Mulryne
28 March 1997	Portugal under-21	2-0	Mourneview Park, Lurgan	Danny Sonner, Steve Robinson
11 February 1998	Republic of Ireland B	1-0	Tolka Park, Dublin	George O'Boyle
9 February 1999	Wales B	0-1	The Racecourse Ground, Wrexham	
20 May 2003	Scotland Future	1-2	Firhill Stadium, Glasgow	Steve Jones
6 May 2009	Scotland B	0-3	Broadwood Stadium, Cumbernauld	

== Squad for most recent game ==
(vs. Scotland B, May 6, 2009)

Goalkeepers

- Trevor Carson (Sunderland)
- Jonathan Tuffey (Partick Thistle)

Defenders

- Chris Casement (Wycombe Wanderers)
- Craig Cathcart* (Manchester United)
- Adam Chapman (Oxford United)
- Shane Duffy (Everton)
- Scott Gibb (Stirling Albion)
- Jeff Hughes* (Bristol Rovers)
- Daniel Lafferty (Celtic)
- Rory McArdle* (Rochdale)
- Ryan McGivern (Manchester City)
- Robbie Weir (Sunderland)

Midfielders

- Martin Donnelly* (Crusaders)
- Corry Evans (Manchester United)
- Shane Ferguson (Newcastle United)
- Robert Garrett (Linfield)
- Paddy McCourt (Celtic)
- Niall McGinn (Celtic)
- Oliver Norwood (Manchester United)
- Michael O'Connor (Crewe Alexandra)

Forwards

- Curtis Allen* (Lisburn Distillery)
- James Lawrie (Port Vale)
- Andrew Little (Rangers)
- Josh McQuoid (AFC Bournemouth)
- Dean Shiels* (Doncaster Rovers)
- Jamie Ward* (Sheffield United)
- *Player withdrew from final squad.

== Other previous players ==
Goalkeepers

- Alan Fettis
- Roy Carroll
- David Miskelly
- Elliott Morris
- Tom Evans

Defenders

- Iain Jenkins
- Pat McGibbon
- Colin Murdock
- Darren Patterson
- Aaron Hughes
- Keith Rowland
- Peter Kennedy
- Barry Hunter
- Stephen Craigan
- Mike Duff
- Danny Griffin
- Gareth McAuley
- Paul Morgan
- Chris Baird

Midfielders

- Jon McCarthy
- Danny Sonner
- Philip Mulryne
- Stephen Robinson
- Michael O'Neill
- Danny Lennon
- Jeff Whitley
- Tommy Doherty
- Grant McCann
- Wayne Carlisle
- Stuart Elliott
- Steve Jones
- Shaun Holmes
- Jim Whitley

Forwards

- Gerry McMahon
- George O'Boyle
- David Healy
- Rory Hamill
- Gary Hamilton
- Andy Kirk
- Andy Smith
- James Broome

== Former coaches ==
(Record: Played Won-Drawn-Lost)

- Peter Doherty 1957-1959 (2 1-1-0)
- Len Graham 1960 (1 0-0-1)
- Bryan Hamilton 1994-1997 (4 2-0-2)
- Roy Millar 1998 (1 1-0-0)
- Lawrie McMenemy 1999 (1 0-0-1)
- Sammy McIlroy 2003 (1 0-0-1)
- Nigel Worthington 2009 (1 0-0-1)
