= Dave Richards =

English football executive

Sir Dave Richards
- Born: David Gerald Richards; 3 October 1943 (age 82); Walkley, Sheffield, England

Sir David Gerald Richards (born 3 October 1943) is the former chairman of the FA Premier League, member of the Football Association's (FA) Board, chairman of the FA's international committee, president of the European Professional Football Leagues organisation, chairman of UEFA's Professional Football Committee, and former chairman of Sheffield Wednesday F.C.

Richards was a director of companies involved in engineering, telecommunications and water and waste treatment, several of which entered administrative receivership or were dissolved. He became a director of Sheffield Wednesday F.C. in October 1989 and chairman five months later, following the departure of the long serving Bert McGee.

Richards was made chairman of the Premier League in 1999, and left Sheffield Wednesday shortly afterwards, with the club facing relegation from the Premiership. He succeeded Lord Pendry as chairman of the Football Foundation in March 2003, and left the post in October 2008. In March 2009, Richards was made Deputy Chairman of the England 2018 FIFA World Cup bid, a position he resigned that November.

In the 2006 Birthday Honours, Richards was knighted for services to sport.

== Controversies ==
=== 2012 Qatar comments ===
At a conference in Qatar in March 2012, Richards accused FIFA and UEFA of stealing football from the English. Richards said that "England gave the world football. Then, fifty years later, some guy came along and said, you're liars, and they actually stole it. It was called FIFA... Fifty years later, another gang came along called UEFA and stole a bit more." Richards later claimed his comments were "light hearted" and said he would write to UEFA and FIFA.

Richards also dismissed suggestions were that the game of football could have originated in China, stating that "It started in Sheffield 150 years ago...The Chinese may say they own it, but the British own it, and we gave it to the rest of the world."

Richards also said FIFA allowed the FA to waste money on their 2018 World Cup bid when, he said, they had little chance of winning it, saying that "Why couldn't FIFA have said, we want to take it to the Gulf...We spent £19m on that bid...When we went for it everybody believed we had a chance. But as we went through it a pattern emerged that suggested maybe we didn't." Richards also warned fans may boycott the 2022 FIFA World Cup in Qatar unless alcohol is made freely available.

The Football Association and the Premier League distanced themselves from Richards remarks, stressing that he was attending the conference in a personal capacity.

=== 2012 Hillsborough Independent Panel Enquiry ===
It emerged from the Hillsborough Independent Panel enquiry in September 2012 that Richards, who was the Chairman of Sheffield Wednesday from March 1990 to February 2000, had refused to put up a memorial at Hillsborough, on legal advice, for the 97 Liverpool supporters that died on 15 April 1989, in the disaster in Hillsborough. (David Conn at The Guardian)
