= Jon Newsome =

English footballer

Personal information
- Full name: Jonathan Newsome
- Date of birth: 6 September 1970 (age 56)
- Place of birth: Sheffield, England
- Height: 6 ft 2 in (1.88 m)
- Position: Defender

Youth career
- Sheffield Wednesday

Senior career*
Years	Team	Apps	(Gls)
1989–1991	Sheffield Wednesday	7	(0)
1991–1994	Leeds United	76	(3)
1994–1996	Norwich City	62	(7)
1996–2000	Sheffield Wednesday	54	(4)
1998–1999	→ Bolton Wanderers (loan)	6	(0)
Total		205	(14)
- * Club domestic league appearances and goals

Jon Newsome (born 6 September 1970) is an English football coach and former professional footballer.

As a player, he was a defender from 1989 until 2000, notably in the Premier League for Sheffield Wednesday, Leeds United and Norwich City. While with Leeds he was part of the team that won the First Division in 1992. He also appeared in the Football League for Bolton Wanderers.

Following retirement, he worked for Grimsby Town as a scout. After a period largely away from the sport, he worked as a coach and agent.

== Playing career ==
Newsome began his career at Sheffield Wednesday, where as a YTS scholar was present at the Hillsborough disaster carrying out ball boy duties. He made his first team debut just three days after his nineteenth birthday, coming on as substitute for the last few minutes against Arsenal at Highbury in a 5–0 defeat. His full debut came against Aldershot in the League Cup and his full League debut came against Millwall shortly after. At the end of the season he joined Leeds United in 1991. At Leeds he played in ten games and scored twice (against Tottenham Hotspur and Sheffield United). The latter was a crucial goal on the second-last weekend of the season as Leeds won the First Division in 1992, meaning Newsome was eligible for a medal. Norwich City manager John Deehan paid Leeds £1,000,000 for his services in 1994. It was the first time that City had paid seven figures for a player and he remained the club's record signing until 2005 when City paid £3,000,000 for Dean Ashton.

Newsome was immediately installed as Norwich captain and became a popular figure with supporters. They voted him Norwich City player of the year at the end of his first season. His good form was not enough, however, to prevent Norwich from being relegated to division one. While Newsome could have doubtless returned to the Premiership he decided to remain at the club to help Norwich regain promotion. He signalled his intent with two excellent headed goals in a 3–1 victory on the opening day of the season against Luton Town at Kenilworth Road.

However the latter part of the 1995/6 season saw Norwich in a perilous financial position and they were forced to sell Newsome to Sheffield Wednesday for £1,600,000 in a move that enraged supporters and increased the protests against chairman Robert Chase. Newsome's career at Hillsborough was frequently interrupted by injury and despite frequent interest from other clubs, he was forced to retire through injury in 2000.

== After playing ==
Newsome has remained popular with Norwich City supporters, and he returned to Carrow Road in September 2002 to play in the exhibition match against Harwich & Parkestone that marked the club's centenary.

Upon retirement, Newsome briefly worked as a scout for Grimsby Town before becoming the owner of a Sheffield-based car sales company, AutoMarques. In late 2018 he closed his motor trade business and started work as a football agent for his own company Innov8 Sports Management Ltd. At the beginning of 2021 Newsome joined New Era Global Sports Management Ltd working as a football intermediary (agent). Newsome also regularly appears as a commentator and analyst on BBC Radio Leeds for their coverage of Leeds United games.

== Honours ==
- First Division: 1991–92
- FA Charity Shield: 1992

=== Awards ===
- Norwich City player of the year: 1995

Sporting positions
Preceded by Ian Butterworth	Norwich City Captain; 1994-1996	Succeeded by Bryan Gunn
