= Peter Atherton (footballer) =

English footballer (born 1970)

- Atherton in 2026

Personal information
- Date of birth: 6 April 1970 (age 56)
- Place of birth: Wigan, England
- Positions: Defender; midfielder

Team information
- Current team: Wigan Athletic (assistant coach)

Senior career*
Years	Team	Apps	(Gls)
1988–1991	Wigan Athletic	149	(1)
1991–1994	Coventry City	114	(0)
1994–2000	Sheffield Wednesday	216	(9)
2000–2005	Bradford City	94	(3)
2001	→ Birmingham City (loan)	10	(0)
2005–2008	Halifax Town	14	(0)
Total		598	(13)

International career
1991	England U21	1	(0)

Managerial career
- 2003: Bradford City (joint caretaker)
- * Club domestic league appearances and goals

Peter Atherton (born 6 April 1970) is an English football coach and former professional player. His currently assistant manager of Wigan Athletic.

As a player, he was a defender who notably played in the Premier League for Coventry City, Sheffield Wednesday and Bradford City. Notably, Peter Atherton made the most Premier League appearances of any player in the 1990s, with 293 in total. He also played in the Football League for Wigan Athletic and Birmingham City before finishing his career with non-league Halifax Town. He was capped once at England U21 level.

Since retirement he has worked as assistant manager of Halifax Town before returning to Wigan Athletic as a youth team coach. He was appointed assistant manager of Barrow and later followed manager Ian Evatt to Bolton Wanderers.

== Early life ==
Atherton was born in Wigan, Greater Manchester.

== Playing career ==
Most famous for captaining Sheffield Wednesday, Atherton started his career at hometown club Wigan Athletic as a trainee and spent three years there before attracting the attention of Coventry City. Atherton scored his first Premier League goal on 27 November 1994 – a "freakishly spectacular 40-yard" volley for Wednesday in the televised 1-1 draw at Aston Villa. Atherton was lured away from Wednesday by Bradford City after relegation on the Bosman ruling where he also spent a spell on loan at Birmingham City. Birmingham reached the League Cup final, however, Atherton was unable to play as he was cup-tied. After being released by Bradford on a free transfer he finished his career at Halifax Town, where injury forced him to retire from professional football after playing only 14 games for the club, but came out of retirement because of Halifax's injury crisis and was named as a substitute for their home game against Grays Athletic on 16 October 2007.

== Coaching career ==
In June 2007, Atherton was appointed assistant manager of Halifax Town, replacing Wayne Jacobs. He had previously been coaching in Wigan Athletic's youth set-up.

He became assistant manager at Barrow in July 2018.

On 1 July 2020, he was appointed as the assistant head coach of Bolton Wanderers, following Barrow head coach Ian Evatt to the University of Bolton Stadium. After the departure of Director of football Tobias Phoenix on 11 December Atherton's role was changed from Assistant head coach to assistant manager. On 22 January 2025, Evatt left by mutual consent — with Atherton leaving his role as well.

In February 2026, he became an assistant coach at Wigan Athletic.

== Honours ==
Individual

- PFA Team of the Year: 1990–91 Third Division
