= Emerson Thome =

Brazilian footballer (born 1972)

Personal information
- Full name: Emerson Augusto Thome
- Date of birth: 30 March 1972 (age 54)
- Place of birth: Porto Alegre, Brazil
- Height: 1.88 m (6 ft 2 in)
- Position: Central defender

Youth career
- 1990–1991: Internacional

Senior career*
Years	Team	Apps	(Gls)
1992	Internacional	–	(–)
1992–1993	Académica	3	(0)
1993–1995	Tirsense	55	(4)
1995–1996	Benfica	8	(1)
1996–1997	→ Alverca (loan)	16	(1)
1997–1999	Sheffield Wednesday	61	(1)
1999–2000	Chelsea	21	(0)
2000–2003	Sunderland	44	(2)
2003–2004	Bolton Wanderers	26	(0)
2004–2006	Wigan Athletic	15	(0)
2005	→ Derby County (loan)	4	(0)
2006–2007	Vissel Kobe	39	(0)
Total		292	(9)
- * Club domestic league appearances and goals

Emerson Augusto Thome (born 30 March 1972), also known as Paredão, is a Brazilian former professional footballer who played as a central defender.

== Career ==
Thome first came to England towards the end of the 1997–98 season when moving to Sheffield Wednesday from Portuguese club Benfica, who signed him from Tirsense in 1994–95, when the "jesuítas" stood one win away from a UEFA Cup position. Whilst at Hillsborough. Thome scored twice for Wednesday, once against Stockport County in the FA Cup and once against Wimbledon in the league.

In late 1999, with the Owls staring at the prospect of possible relegation in the face, he made the move to Chelsea for a fee of £2.7 million. He was to remain at Stamford Bridge for just nine months, as he found it hard to break up the tried and tested central defensive partnership of Marcel Desailly and Frank Leboeuf. Thome was cup-tied for Chelsea's victorious 1999–2000 FA Cup campaign. He did however start when Chelsea memorably beat Barcelona 3–1 in the first leg of their UEFA Champions League quarter-final. Just one game into the 2000–01 season Thome was sold to Premiership rivals Sunderland for a fee of around £4 million.

During his time at the Stadium of Light, Thome struggled with injuries and Sunderland were reluctant to extend his contract. A clause in his contract with Sunderland meant that a considerable sum had to be paid to Chelsea after he played 50 matches. Sunderland were not willing to pay the extra appearance based fee, hence their reasons for not playing Thome towards the end of the 2002–03 season, a campaign which ended in relegation. Thome scored twice for Sunderland, netting in league games against Coventry City and Aston Villa.

In August 2003, Thome joined Bolton Wanderers on a free transfer, and became a regular campaigner for the Trotters as they finished eighth in the Premier League and reached the League Cup final where they lost to Middlesbrough at the Millennium Stadium. In the summer of 2004, he moved to Championship side Wigan Athletic along with former Bolton teammate Per Frandsen. Thome was part of the Wigan side which were promoted to the Premier League for the first time in their history in 2005. His second season with the Latics saw him face less playing time which resulted in Thome being loaned out to Championship side Derby County for several months. Once the loan had expired with Derby County, he returned to Wigan Athletic where on 7 February 2006, the Latics decided to release him from his contract. Following his release by Wigan, Thome joined Japanese side Vissel Kobe. He remained there for two seasons. In 2007, Thome announced his retirement from professional football.

Since his retirement from playing football, Thome now works for Everton as a chief scout in Portugal since late 2008.

== Honours ==
Internacional

- Campeonato Gaúcho: 1992

Tirsense

- Segunda Liga: 1993–94

Benfica

- Taça de Portugal: 1995–96

Chelsea

- FA Cup: 1999–2000
- FA Charity Shield: 2000

Bolton Wanderers

- Football League Cup runner-up: 2003–04
