= Lee Briscoe =

English footballer

Personal information
- Full name: Lee Stephen Briscoe
- Date of birth: 30 September 1975 (age 51)
- Place of birth: Pontefract, England
- Height: 5 ft 11 in (1.80 m)
- Positions: Left back; left midfielder

Youth career
- ?–1994: Sheffield Wednesday

Senior career*
Years	Team	Apps	(Gls)
1994–2000	Sheffield Wednesday	78	(1)
1998	→ Manchester City (loan)	5	(1)
2000–2003	Burnley	106	(7)
2003–2004	Preston North End	2	(0)
Total		191	(9)

International career
1996–1997	England U21	4	(0)
- * Club domestic league appearances and goals

Lee Stephen Briscoe (born 30 September 1975) is an English former professional footballer who played as a left back and left midfielder.

He notably played in the Premier League for Sheffield Wednesday, before having spells in the Football League with Manchester City, Burnley and Preston North End. He was capped four times at England U21 between 1996 and 1997.

== Club career ==
Briscoe began his career at Sheffield Wednesday and was highly rated when young, making five appearances for the England Under-21 side. He scored his only goal for Wednesday in a 1–0 victory over Arsenal in the 1998–99 season. This goal was somewhat overshadowed by Paolo Di Canio's notorious pushing incident on referee Paul Alcock which led to two players (Di Canio and Martin Keown) being sent off.

Briscoe would make more than 70 appearances for 'the Owls' and went on a short loan spell at Manchester City (where he scored once against Huddersfield Town) before eventually being released on a free transfer.

He was signed up by Stan Ternent, the manager of Burnley as a solution to their problems down the left hand side. He formed an excellent partnership with Paul Cook, the experienced left midfielder, and the two would often devise new free-kick routines between them, with Gareth Taylor often the goal scoring beneficiary.

After more than one hundred league appearances for Burnley, Briscoe was released due to financial worries at the club. He would sign for rivals and neighbours Preston North End, a move which was controversial to sections of the Burnley crowd. However, the native of Pontefract made little impact at Deepdale, starting just two games in his year long spell.

== International career ==
Briscoe was capped four times at England U21 between 1996 and 1997.
