= Kevin Pressman =

English footballer and coach

Personal information
- Full name: Kevin Paul Pressman
- Date of birth: 6 November 1967 (age 58)
- Place of birth: Fareham, England
- Height: 6 ft 1 in (1.85 m)
- Position: Goalkeeper

Team information
- Current team: Gainsborough Trinity (goalkeeping coach)

Senior career*
Years	Team	Apps	(Gls)
1987–2004	Sheffield Wednesday	404	(0)
1992	→ Stoke City (loan)	4	(0)
2004	→ West Bromwich Albion (loan)	0	(0)
2004–2005	Leicester City	13	(0)
2005	Leeds United	0	(0)
2005	Coventry City	0	(0)
2005–2006	Mansfield Town	41	(0)
2006–2007	Portadown	43	(0)
2007–2009	Scunthorpe United	0	(0)
Total		505	(0)

International career
1984	England U17	1	(0)
1984–1986	England Youth	5	(0)
1988	England U21	1	(0)
1994–1998	England B	3	(0)
- * Club domestic league appearances and goals

Kevin Paul Pressman (born 6 November 1967) is an English football coach, former professional goalkeeper, and goalkeeping coach and assistant manager for Gainsborough Trinity.

As a player, he made over 500 appearances in both the Premier League and Football League, most notably with Sheffield Wednesday, where he made 404 appearances for over a seventeen-year spell at Hillsborough. After leaving Wednesday in 2004, Pressman went on to play for Stoke City, West Bromwich Albion, Leicester City, Leeds United, Coventry City, Mansfield Town and Scunthorpe United in the Football League, and also briefly played in the Irish League for Portadown before retiring in 2009. He was capped three times at England B level and had also made an appearance for the England U21s in 1988.

Following his retirement, he has worked as a coach for Belper Town, Bradford City, Millwall, and Scunthorpe United.

== Playing career ==
=== Sheffield Wednesday ===
Pressman is best remembered as the long-time goalkeeper of Sheffield Wednesday, where he spent 19 seasons, playing 478 matches in all competitions including the UEFA Cup. Pressman signed his first professional contract for the Owls on his 18th birthday in 1985 and made his debut against Southampton on 5 September 1987. He had supported Wednesday since childhood. Pressman's career was nearly wrecked on New Year's Day 1990 when he suffered cruciate knee-ligament damage which sidelined him for over eight months. He was unlucky not to play in the 1991 League Cup final victory against Manchester United, as he had played in every round of the competition that year as well as a significant number of league matches until the quarter final stage where he was replaced by more senior goalkeeper and future Wednesday manager Chris Turner. Pressman was on the substitutes' bench at three further Wembley finals, all in 1993; the League Cup final, FA Cup final and FA Cup final replay, all against Arsenal and resulting in defeats in both competitions for Wednesday.

In his prime, Pressman was considered one of the best goalkeepers in the Premiership. He had a tendency to play particularly well in Steel City Derby games. He also became known for both saving and scoring penalties, most notably the winner in a shoot-out against Watford in the FA Cup in 1998. Pressman entered the record books on 13 August 2000 when he was sent off after just 13 seconds in a match against Wolverhampton Wanderers. The dismissal, given for handling outside the area, was the fastest ever in English football history. Sheffield Wednesday went on to draw 1–1. It was bettered in late 2008 by David Pratt of Chippenham Town who was sent off three seconds into a game. Pressman showed great resilience to fend off many fellow goalkeepers for the number 1 shirt at Hillsborough, outlasting Chris Turner, Chris Woods and Pavel Srníček to name just a few. His last game for the Owls came on the final day of the 2003–04 season at Hillsborough against Queens Park Rangers.

=== Latter career ===
In July 2005, Pressman was signed by Mansfield Town, at the time managed by his former Sheffield Wednesday teammate Carlton Palmer, and was first-choice goalkeeper for the majority of the following season. In addition to Sheffield Wednesday and Mansfield, Pressman has also played for Stoke City on loan and Leicester City. After being released by Leicester, he was signed by Leeds United as cover for Neil Sullivan, but never made an appearance.

Pressman announced his retirement from the game in July 2006 after being released by Mansfield Town although there were some rumours that he would return to Wednesday in a coaching role. He is now a member of Sheffield Wednesday's Masters team and is considered a legend at Hillsborough, where he was affectionately known as 'Big Kev'. He came top in a poll to find Sheffield Wednesday's greatest ever keeper on the website Vital Football.

At the end of September 2006 Pressman signed a short-term deal with Northern Ireland side Portadown, who had a goalkeeping crisis. He impressed Ports' fans with his displays between the sticks, despite his age of 39, and helped the club in their rise up the league table. Despite training in Doncaster during the week and flying to Northern Ireland for matches, Pressman signed a contract extension with Portadown in late December 2006 that kept him at the club until the end of the 2006–07 season. At the end of that season he decided to call time on his impressive career after winning Portadown's 'Player of the Season' award.

== International career ==
Pressman was never capped at senior level even though he was called up to the senior squad on numerous occasions, but did play for England at under-21 level as well as winning three "B" caps between 1994 and 1998.

== Coaching career ==
Pressman holds an FA A coaching licence. In May 2007 he was appointed as goalkeeping coach under Nigel Adkins at Championship side Scunthorpe United and even featured on the substitutes' bench during a goalkeeping crisis at the club. He then progressed to his most high-profile coaching role, again at Scunthorpe, as assistant manager to Ian Baraclough. Both men, however, lost their jobs in March 2011 after a string of poor results left the Iron deep in relegation trouble.

In May 2008 he also became joint manager of Belper Town reserves.

On 20 August 2011 Bradford City announced that Pressman would be the new goalkeeping coach, replacing Tim Dittmer, who – with the club's blessing – left to take up a position at Premier League side Manchester City. On 21 June 2012 Pressman moved to the same role at Millwall.

On 1 June 2018, Pressman left Millwall, after six years. In July 2019, Pressman returned to Scunthorpe United as assistant manager of the U23 team and goalkeeper coach.

On 20 August 2021, he joined Non-League side Grantham Town as a goalkeeping coach to work alongside former Wednesday teammate and Town manager Carlton Palmer. In the summer of 2023 he left Grantham Town.

== Personal life ==
Pressman is a lifelong supporter of boyhood club Sheffield Wednesday; having joined as a youth, he would go on to spend 19 years with the club as a professional. He is the brother of BBC Radio Sheffield presenter Howard Pressman. He is married to Joanne and has three children, Tom - who is also a goalkeeping coach, and in 2019 was signed by Sheffield United Women - Danny and Sophie.

On 3 September 1998, Pressman's Mercedes-Benz S320 was stolen from his Chesterfield home at around 6:15am. Pressman was awoken by the noise and chased the thief for 15 miles, by car and on foot, before helping police to corner and arrest the man in a field.

== Career statistics ==
Appearances and goals by club, season and competition
Club	Season	League			FA Cup		League Cup		Other^{[A]}		Total	
Club	Season	Division	Apps	Goals	Apps	Goals	Apps	Goals	Apps	Goals	Apps	Goals
Sheffield Wednesday	1987–88	First Division	11	0	0	0	0	0	0	0	11	0
Sheffield Wednesday	1988–89	First Division	9	0	0	0	1	0	0	0	10	0
Sheffield Wednesday	1989–90	First Division	15	0	0	0	2	0	2	0	19	0
Sheffield Wednesday	1990–91	Second Division	23	0	0	0	6	0	1	0	30	0
Sheffield Wednesday	1991–92	First Division	1	0	0	0	0	0	0	0	1	0
Sheffield Wednesday	1992–93	Premier League	3	0	0	0	2	0	1	0	6	0
Sheffield Wednesday	1993–94	Premier League	32	0	4	0	6	0	0	0	42	0
Sheffield Wednesday	1994–95	Premier League	34	0	3	0	4	0	0	0	41	0
Sheffield Wednesday	1995–96	Premier League	30	0	1	0	4	0	0	0	35	0
Sheffield Wednesday	1996–97	Premier League	38	0	4	0	2	0	0	0	44	0
Sheffield Wednesday	1997–98	Premier League	36	0	3	0	2	0	0	0	41	0
Sheffield Wednesday	1998–99	Premier League	15	0	1	0	2	0	0	0	18	0
Sheffield Wednesday	1999–2000	Premier League	19	0	0	0	2	0	0	0	21	0
Sheffield Wednesday	2000–01	First Division	39	0	1	0	5	0	0	0	45	0
Sheffield Wednesday	2001–02	First Division	40	0	1	0	6	0	0	0	47	0
Sheffield Wednesday	2002–03	First Division	38	0	0	0	2	0	0	0	40	0
Sheffield Wednesday	2003–04	Second Division	21	0	3	0	0	0	3	0	27	0
Sheffield Wednesday	Total		404	0	21	0	46	0	7	0	478	0
Stoke City (loan)	1991–92	Third Division	4	0	0	0	0	0	2	0	6	0
Leicester City	2004–05	Championship	13	0	1	0	1	0	0	0	15	0
Mansfield Town	2005–06	League Two	41	0	3	0	2	0	0	0	46	0
Career total			462	0	25	0	49	0	9	0	545	0

A. The "Other" column constitutes appearances and goals in the Full Members Cup, Football League Trophy and UEFA Cup.
