= Sheffield Wednesday F.C. Player of the Year =

Annual award presented to players of Sheffield Wednesday

The Sheffield Wednesday F.C. Player of the Year is an annual award presented to players of Sheffield Wednesday on behalf of the club's fans to recognise an outstanding contribution to the previous season. The award was first presented in 1969 following the 1968–69 season. As of the 2019–20 season, the award is presented to the winner of a public vote on the Sheffield Wednesday official website.

== Explanation of list ==
=== Appearances ===
Appearances and goals are listed for the season for which the player won the award. Only competitive fixtures are included in the statistics. These include:

- Premier League and English Football League (including play-off matches in the latter)
- Official European competitions – UEFA Cup, Intertoto Cup, Inter-Cities Fairs Cup, Anglo-Italian Cup
- Official domestic competitions – FA Cup, EFL Cup, EFL Trophy, Full Members' Cup
- Friendly matches, exhibition games, and pre-season tournaments are excluded from the figures.

=== Table headers ===
- Season – Seasons are scheduled to run from August until May of the following year, with the award usually being presented in April or May for the preceding season.
- Level – The league and level at which the season was played. Division One was the highest level in English football until the formation of the Premier League in 1992–93, after which Division One became the second tier. In 2004–05 the Championship was formed as the new second tier with League One and League Two making up the remainder of the English Football League.
- Nationality – The player's officially recognised FIFA nationality. A player may have been born in one country but represented another nation through family ancestry.
- Apps – The number of games played in the season including any substitute appearances.
- Goals – The number of goals scored in the season.
- Notes – Further information on the award.

== Winners ==
Season	Level	Name	Position	Nationality	Apps	Gls	Notes	Refs
1968–69	Division One	John Ritchie	Forward	England	29	8	Inaugural winner. First forward to win.	
1969–70	Division One	Peter Eustace	Midfielder	England	20	5	First midfielder to win.	
1970–71	Division Two	Peter Grummitt	Goalkeeper	England	43	0	First goalkeeper to win.	
1971–72	Division Two	John Sissons	Forward	England	44	9		
1972–73	Division Two	Tommy Craig	Midfielder	Scotland	45	11	First non-English player to win.	
1973–74	Division Two	Mick Prendergast	Forward	England	33	11		
1974–75	Division Two	Eric Potts	Midfielder	England	44	3		
1975–76	Division Three	Eric Potts	Midfielder	England	48	9	First player to win the award twice.	
1976–77	Division Three	Chris Turner	Goalkeeper	England	52	0		
1977–78	Division Three	Tommy Tynan	Forward	England	52	21		
1978–79	Division Three	Ian Porterfield	Midfielder	Scotland	59	2		
1979–80	Division Three	Jeff Johnson	Midfielder	Wales	36	1		
1980–81	Division Two	Mark Smith	Defender	England	47	1	First defender to win.	
1981–82	Division Two	Gary Bannister	Forward	England	45	22		
1982–83	Division Two	Mel Sterland	Defender	England	47	1		
1983–84	Division Two	Gary Shelton	Midfielder	England	49	7		
1984–85	Division One	Imre Varadi	Forward	England	47	21		
1985–86	Division One	Martin Hodge	Goalkeeper	England	52	0		
1986–87	Division One	Lee Chapman	Forward	England	48	22		
1987–88	Division One	Gary Megson	Midfielder	England	46	2		
1988–89	Division One	Lawrie Madden	Defender	England	31	0		
1989–90	Division One	David Hirst	Forward	England	43	16		
1990–91	Division Two	Nigel Pearson	Defender	England	51	12		
1991–92	Division One	Phil King	Defender	England	45	1		
1992–93	Premier League	Chris Waddle	Midfielder	England	54	4		
1993–94	Premier League	Des Walker	Defender	England	54	0		
1994–95	Premier League	Peter Atherton	Defender	England	48	1		
1995–96	Premier League	Marc Degryse	Forward	Belgium	38	12	First non-British player to win.	
1996–97	Premier League	Mark Pembridge	Midfielder	Wales	39	7		
1997–98	Premier League	Paolo Di Canio	Forward	Italy	40	14		
1998–99	Premier League	Benito Carbone	Forward	Italy	36	9		
1999–2000	Premier League	Niclas Alexandersson	Midfielder	Sweden	44	8		
2000–01	Division One	Gerald Sibon	Forward	Netherlands	48	15		
2001–02	Division One	Derek Geary	Defender	Republic of Ireland	39	0		
2002–03	Division One	Alan Quinn	Midfielder	Republic of Ireland	40	5		
2003–04	Division Two	Guylain Ndumbu-Nsungu	Forward	DR Congo	32	10	First African player to win.	
2004–05	League One	Steven MacLean	Forward	Scotland	41	20		
2005–06	Championship	Graham Coughlan	Defender	Republic of Ireland	36	5		
2006–07	Championship	Glenn Whelan	Midfielder	Republic of Ireland	41	8		
2007–08	Championship	Mark Beevers	Defender	England	30	1		
2008–09	Championship	Marcus Tudgay	Forward	England	42	14		
2009–10	Championship	Lee Grant	Goalkeeper	England	49	0		
2010–11	League One	Neil Mellor	Forward	England	43	20		
2011–12	League One	José Semedo	Midfielder	Portugal	51	1		
2012–13	Championship	Lewis Buxton	Defender	England	44	0		
2013–14	Championship	Liam Palmer	Defender	Scotland	44	0		
2014–15	Championship	Keiren Westwood	Goalkeeper	Republic of Ireland	43	0		
2015–16	Championship	Fernando Forestieri	Forward	Italy	39	15		
2016–17	Championship	Keiren Westwood	Goalkeeper	Republic of Ireland	45	0	First goalkeeper to win twice.	
2017–18	Championship	Adam Reach	Midfielder	England	53	4		
2018–19	Championship	Michael Hector	Defender	Jamaica	39	2	First player from the Americas to win.	
2019–20	Championship	Dominic Iorfa	Defender	England	45	2		
2020–21	Championship	Barry Bannan	Midfielder	Scotland	49	2		
2021–22	League One	Barry Bannan	Midfielder	Scotland	51	9		
2022–23	League One	Liam Palmer	Defender	Scotland	52	6		
2023–24	Championship	Will Vaulks	Midfielder	Wales	37	0		
2024–25	Championship	Shea Charles	Midfielder	Northern Ireland	44	1		
2025–26	Championship	Svante Ingelsson	Midfielder	Sweden	41	1		

=== Wins by player ===
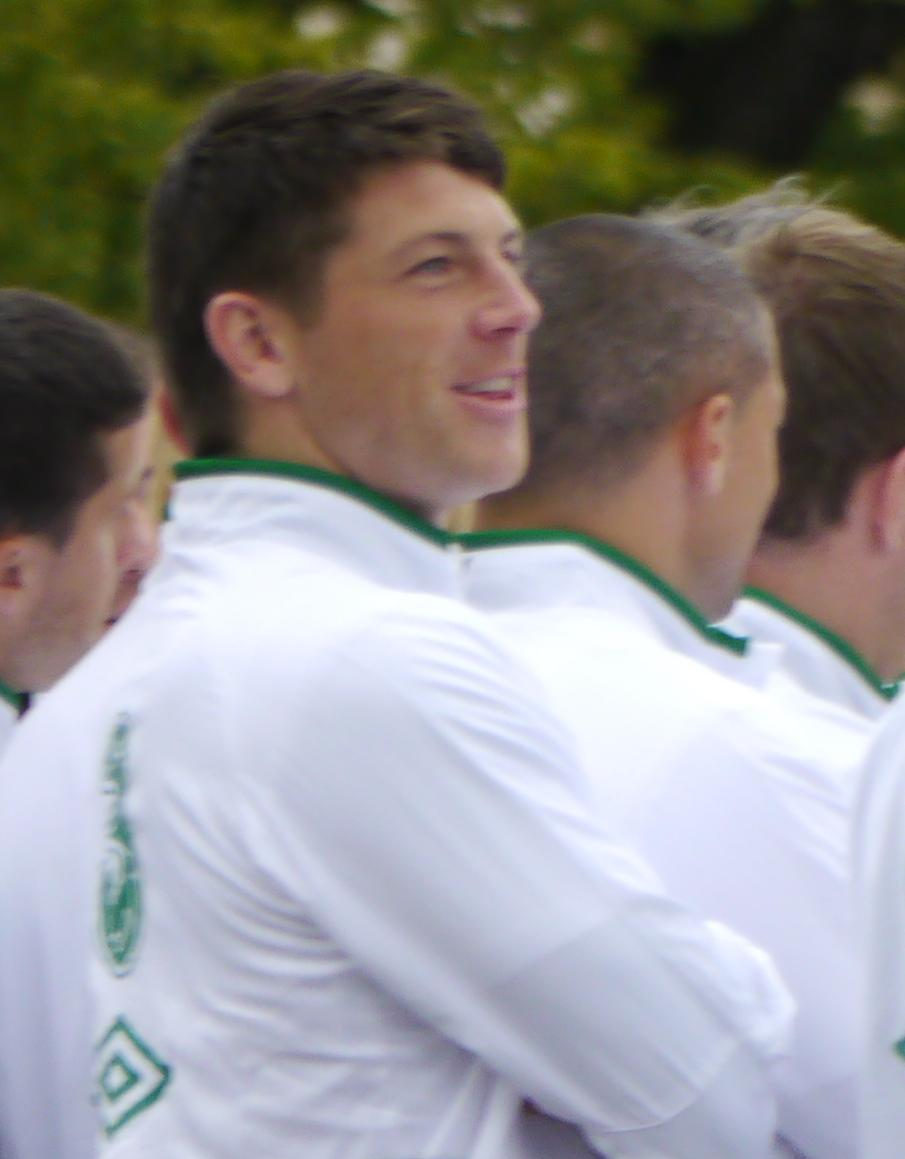
Keiren Westwood is one of only four players to win the award on multiple occasions.

Players who have won the award more than once.

Winner	Total wins	Year(s)
(England) Eric Potts	2	1974–75, 1975–76
(Republic of Ireland) Keiren Westwood	2	2014–15, 2016–17
(Scotland) Barry Bannan	2	2020–21, 2021–22
(Scotland) Liam Palmer	2	2013–14, 2022–23

=== Wins by playing position ===
Position	Number of winners
Goalkeeper	5
Defender	15
Midfielder	19
Forward	17

=== Wins by nationality ===
Nationality	Number of winners
England	30
Scotland	7
Republic of Ireland	5
Italy	3
Wales	3
Sweden	2
Belgium	1
DR Congo	1
Jamaica	1
Netherlands	1
Northern Ireland	1
Portugal	1
