= 1990–91 Sheffield Wednesday F.C. season =

English football club season

Sheffield Wednesday
1990–91 season
- Chairman: Dave Richards
- Manager: Ron Atkinson
- Stadium: Hillsborough
- Second Division: 3rd
- FA Cup: Fifth round
- Rumbelows Cup: Winners
- ZDS Cup: Second round
- Top goalscorer: League: David Hirst (24); All: David Hirst (32)
- Highest home attendance: 34,845 v Oldham Athletic (Second Division, 3 November 1990)
- Lowest home attendance: 5,942 v Barnsley (ZDS Cup, 18 December 1990)
- Average home league attendance: 26,605
- Biggest win: 5–1 v Hull City (H), Second Division, 1 September 1990
- Biggest defeat: 0–4 v Cambridge United (A), FA Cup, 16 February 1991

During the 1990–91 English football season, Sheffield Wednesday F.C. competed in the Football League Second Division, following relegation from the First Division the previous season. They finished third to make an immediate return to the top flight and also won the League Cup (then known as the Rumbelows Cup for sponsorship reasons).

== Season summary ==
Wednesday began the season strongly with four straight wins and remained unbeaten until their 13th league match. Although they never dropped below fourth in the table, a run of three straight defeats in March and April threatened to derail their progress, but they recovered to clinch promotion with a 3–1 win over Bristol City at Hillsborough in the penultimate match of the season.

A 4–0 humbling at Cambridge United put paid to Wednesday's FA Cup hopes in the fifth round, but their Rumbelows Cup campaign proved considerably more successful. Having already disposed of three First Division sides en route to the final, they beat Manchester United by a John Sheridan goal to claim their first major trophy since winning the FA Cup in 1935.

== Squad ==
Players who made one appearance or more for Sheffield Wednesday F.C. during the 1990-91 season

| Pos. | Name | League | | Rumbelows Cup | | ZDS Cup | | FA Cup | | Total | |
| Pos. | Name | Apps | Goals | Apps | Goals | Apps | Goals | Apps | Goals | Apps | Goals |
|---|---|---|---|---|---|---|---|---|---|---|---|
| GK | (England) Kevin Pressman | 23 | 0 | 6 | 0 | 1 | 0 | 0 | 0 | 30 | 0 |
| GK | (England) Chris Turner | 23 | 0 | 4 | 0 | 0 | 0 | 4 | 0 | 31 | 0 |
| DF | (England) Viv Anderson | 21(1) | 2 | 0 | 0 | 0 | 0 | 3 | 1 | 24(1) | 3 |
| DF | (England) Phil King | 43 | 0 | 9 | 0 | 0 | 0 | 4 | 0 | 56 | 0 |
| DF | (England) Lawrie Madden | 1(4) | 0 | 2(2) | 0 | 0 | 0 | 0 | 0 | 3(6) | 0 |
| DF | (England) Jon Newsome | 1 | 0 | 0 | 0 | 0 | 0 | 0 | 0 | 1 | 0 |
| DF | (Sweden) Roland Nilsson | 22 | 0 | 2 | 0 | 0 | 0 | 0 | 0 | 24 | 0 |
| DF | (England) Nigel Pearson | 39 | 6 | 9 | 5 | 1 | 0 | 4 | 1 | 53 | 12 |
| DF | (England) Peter Shirtliff | 39 | 2 | 10 | 1 | 1 | 0 | 4 | 1 | 54 | 4 |
| MF | (United States) John Harkes | 22(1) | 2 | 7 | 1 | 1 | 0 | 3(1) | 0 | 33(2) | 3 |
| MF | (England) Steve McCall | 13(6) | 2 | 2(3) | 0 | 0(1) | 0 | 1 | 0 | 15(10) | 2 |
| MF | (England) Steve MacKenzie | 5(7) | 2 | 0 | 0 | 0 | 0 | 0 | 0 | 5(7) | 2 |
| MF | (England) Carlton Palmer | 45 | 2 | 9 | 0 | 1 | 0 | 4 | 1 | 59 | 3 |
| MF | (Republic of Ireland) John Sheridan | 45(1) | 10 | 9 | 1 | 1 | 0 | 4 | 1 | 59(1) | 12 |
| MF | (Northern Ireland) Danny Wilson | 35(1) | 6 | 10 | 1 | 1 | 0 | 2 | 0 | 48(1) | 7 |
| MF | (Northern Ireland) Nigel Worthington | 31(2) | 1 | 10 | 0 | 1 | 0 | 3 | 0 | 45(2) | 1 |
| FW | (England) Trevor Francis | 18(20) | 4 | 5(1) | 1 | 1 | 0 | 2(1) | 1 | 26(22) | 6 |
| FW | (England) David Hirst | 39(2) | 24 | 9 | 3 | 1 | 3 | 4 | 2 | 53(2) | 32 |
| FW | (England) Gordon Watson | 1(4) | 0 | 0 | 0 | 0 | 0 | 0 | 0 | 1(4) | 0 |
| FW | (England) Steve Whitton | 0(1) | 0 | 0 | 0 | 0 | 0 | 0 | 0 | 0(1) | 0 |
| FW | (England) Paul Williams | 40(6) | 15 | 7(3) | 2 | 1 | 0 | 2(2) | 0 | 50(11) | 17 |

== Final league table ==
| Pos | Team | Pld | W | D | L | GF | GA | GD | Pts | Qualification or relegation |
|---|---|---|---|---|---|---|---|---|---|---|
| 1 | Oldham Athletic (C, P) | 46 | 25 | 13 | 8 | 83 | 53 | +30 | 88 | Promotion to the First Division |
| 2 | West Ham United (P) | 46 | 24 | 15 | 7 | 60 | 34 | +26 | 87 | Promotion to the First Division |
| 3 | Sheffield Wednesday (P) | 46 | 22 | 16 | 8 | 80 | 51 | +29 | 82 | Promotion to the First Division |
| 4 | Notts County (O, P) | 46 | 23 | 11 | 12 | 76 | 55 | +21 | 80 | Qualification for the Second Division play-offs |
| 5 | Millwall | 46 | 20 | 13 | 13 | 70 | 51 | +19 | 73 | Qualification for the Second Division play-offs |

Rules for classification: 1) Points; 2) Goal difference; 3) Goals scored
(C) Champions; (O) Play-off winners; (P) Promoted

== Results ==
=== Second Division ===
| Date | Opponent | Venue | Result | Scorers | Attendance |
|---|---|---|---|---|---|
| 25 August 1990 | Ipswich Town | A | 2–0 | Williams, Shirtliff | 17,284 |
| 1 September 1990 | Hull City | H | 5–1 | Hirst (4), Williams | 23,673 |
| 8 September 1990 | Charlton Athletic | A | 1–0 | Sheridan | 7,407 |
| 15 September 1990 | Watford | H | 2–0 | Pearson, Worthington | 22,061 |
| 18 September 1990 | Newcastle United | H | 2–2 | Hirst, McCall | 30,628 |
| 22 September 1990 | Leicester City | A | 4–2 | Hirst (2), Wilson, Williams | 16,156 |
| 29 September 1990 | West Ham United | H | 1–1 | Hirst | 28,786 |
| 3 October 1990 | Brighton & Hove Albion | A | 4–0 | Wilson, Sheridan, Williams, Pearson | 10,379 |
| 6 October 1990 | Bristol Rovers | A | 1–0 | Francis | 6,413 |
| 13 October 1990 | Plymouth Argyle | H | 3–0 | Wilson, Sheridan (2) | 23,489 |
| 20 October 1990 | Port Vale | H | 1–1 | Williams | 24,527 |
| 23 October 1990 | Barnsley | A | 1–1 | Palmer | 23,079 |
| 27 October 1990 | Millwall | A | 2–4 | Hirst (2) | 12,863 |
| 3 November 1990 | Oldham Athletic | H | 2–2 | Sheridan (2 pens.) | 34,845 |
| 10 November 1990 | Blackburn Rovers | A | 0–1 | | 13,437 |
| 17 November 1990 | Swindon Town | H | 2–1 | Williams, Pearson | 22,715 |
| 24 November 1990 | West Bromwich Albion | A | 2–1 | Francis, Shirtliff | 16,546 |
| 1 December 1990 | Notts County | H | 2–2 | Sheridan (pen.), Hirst | 23,474 |
| 8 December 1990 | Bristol City | A | 1–1 | Wilson | 11,254 |
| 15 December 1990 | Ipswich Town | H | 2–2 | Francis, Pearson | 19,333 |
| 22 December 1990 | Oxford United | A | 2–2 | Hirst, Wilson | 6,061 |
| 26 December 1990 | Wolverhampton Wanderers | H | 2–2 | McCall, Palmer | 29,686 |
| 29 December 1990 | Portsmouth | H | 2–1 | Hirst (2) | 22,885 |
| 1 January 1991 | Middlesbrough | A | 2–0 | Hirst, Williams | 22,869 |
| 12 January 1991 | Hull City | A | 1–0 | Williams | 10,907 |
| 19 January 1991 | Charlton Athletic | H | 0–0 | | 22,318 |
| 2 February 1991 | Watford | A | 2–2 | Harkes, Williams | 10,338 |
| 19 February 1991 | Swindon Town | A | 1–2 | Hirst | 8,274 |
| 2 March 1991 | Notts County | A | 2–0 | Williams, Thomas (o.g.) | 15,546 |
| 9 March 1991 | West Bromwich Albion | H | 1–0 | Sheridan (pen.) | 26,934 |
| 13 March 1991 | Brighton & Hove Albion | H | 1–1 | Anderson | 23,969 |
| 16 March 1991 | West Ham United | A | 3–1 | Hirst, Williams (2) | 26,182 |
| 19 March 1991 | Plymouth Argyle | A | 1–1 | MacKenzie | 7,806 |
| 23 March 1991 | Bristol Rovers | H | 2–1 | Clark (o.g.), Williams | 25,074 |
| 30 March 1991 | Wolverhampton Wanderers | A | 2–3 | Pearson (2) | 18,011 |
| 1 April 1991 | Oxford United | H | 0–2 | | 28,682 |
| 6 April 1991 | Portsmouth | A | 0–2 | | 10,390 |
| 10 April 1991 | Blackburn Rovers | H | 3–1 | Anderson, Sheridan (2; 1 pen.) | 23,139 |
| 13 April 1991 | Middlesbrough | H | 2–0 | Williams (2) | 30,598 |
| 17 April 1991 | Newcastle United | A | 0–1 | | 18,330 |
| 24 April 1991 | Leicester City | H | 0–0 | | 31,308 |
| 27 April 1991 | Barnsley | H | 3–1 | Hirst, Harkes, MacKenzie | 30,693 |
| 4 May 1991 | Millwall | H | 2–1 | Hirst (2) | 30,278 |
| 6 May 1991 | Port Vale | A | 1–1 | Hirst | 13,317 |
| 8 May 1991 | Bristol City | H | 3–1 | Hirst (2), Francis | 31,706 |
| 11 May 1991 | Oldham Athletic | A | 2–3 | Hirst, Wilson | 18,809 |

=== Rumbelows Cup ===
| Round | Date | Opponent | Venue | Result | Goalscorers | Attendance |
|---|---|---|---|---|---|---|
| 2(1L) | 26 September 1990 | Brentford | H | 2–1 | Hirst, Pearson | 11,207 |
| 2(2L) | 9 October 1990 | Brentford | A | 2–1 | Francis, Pearson | 8,227 |
| 3 | 31 October 1990 | Swindon Town | H | 0–0 | | 13,900 |
| 3(R) | 6 November 1990 | Swindon Town | A | 1–0 | Pearson | 9,043 |
| 4 | 28 November 1990 | Derby County | H | 1–1 | Hirst | 25,649 |
| 4(R) | 12 December 1990 | Derby County | A | 2–1 | Harkes, Williams | 17,050 |
| 5 | 23 January 1991 | Coventry City | A | 1–0 | Pearson | 20,712 |
| SF(1L) | 24 February 1991 | Chelsea | A | 2–0 | Shirtliff, Hirst | 34,074 |
| SF(2L) | 27 February 1991 | Chelsea | H | 3–1 | Pearson, Wilson, Williams | 34,669 |
| F | 21 April 1991 | Manchester United | N | 1–0 | Sheridan | 80,000 |

=== ZDS Cup ===
| Round | Date | Opponent | Venue | Result | Goalscorers | Attendance |
|---|---|---|---|---|---|---|
| 2 | 18 December 1990 | Barnsley | H | 3–3 (a.e.t.) (2–4 p) | Hirst (3) | 5,942 |

=== FA Cup ===
| Round | Date | Opponent | Venue | Result | Goalscorers | Attendance |
|---|---|---|---|---|---|---|
| 3 | 5 January 1991 | Mansfield Town | A | 2–0 | Shirtliff, Sheridan (pen.) | 9,076 |
| 4 | 26 January 1991 | Millwall | A | 4–4 | Hirst, Francis, Pearson, Palmer | 13,663 |
| 4(R) | 30 January 1991 | Millwall | H | 2–0 | Anderson, Hirst | 25,140 |
| 5 | 16 February 1991 | Cambridge United | A | 0–4 | | 9,624 |
