= 1989–90 Sheffield Wednesday F.C. season =

English football club season

Sheffield Wednesday
1989–90 season
- Manager: Ron Atkinson
- Stadium: Hillsborough Stadium
- First Division: 18th (relegated)
- FA Cup: Fourth round
- League Cup: Third round
- Full Members' Cup: Third round
- Top goalscorer: League: David Hirst (14); All: David Hirst (16)

The 1989–90 season was Sheffield Wednesday's 88th season in the Football League, and their sixth consecutive season in the Football League First Division, the top tier of English football, where they finished 18th and were relegated to the Second Division. The club also participated in the FA Cup and Football League Cup, being eliminated in the fourth round of the former and the third round of the latter.

== Squad ==
Squad at end of season.

Note: Flags indicate national team as defined under FIFA eligibility rules; some limited exceptions apply. Players may hold more than one non-FIFA nationality.

Pos.	Nation	Player
GK	ENG	Lance Key
GK	ENG	Kevin Pressman
GK	ENG	Chris Turner
DF	ENG	Dean Barrick
DF	ENG	Greg Fee
DF	ENG	Phil King
DF	ENG	Ian Knight
DF	ENG	Lawrie Madden
DF	ENG	Jon Newsome
DF	SWE	Roland Nilsson
DF	ENG	Nigel Pearson
DF	ENG	Peter Shirtliff
DF	ENG	Darren Wood

Pos.	Nation	Player
DF	NIR	Nigel Worthington
MF	ENG	Dave Bennett
MF	ENG	Graham Hyde
MF	ENG	Steve McCall
MF	ENG	Carlton Palmer
MF	ENG	Craig Shakespeare
MF	IRL	John Sheridan
MF	ENG	Mark Taylor
FW	ENG	Dalian Atkinson
FW	ENG	Trevor Francis
FW	ENG	David Hirst
FW	ENG	Steve Whitton

== Competitions ==
=== Football League First Division ===
==== League table ====
Pos	Team	Pld	W	D	L	GF	GA	GD	Pts	Qualification or relegation
16	Derby County	38	13	7	18	43	40	+3	46	
17	Luton Town	38	10	13	15	43	57	−14	43	
18	Sheffield Wednesday (R)	38	11	10	17	35	51	−16	43	Relegation to the Second Division
19	Charlton Athletic (R)	38	7	9	22	31	57	−26	30	Relegation to the Second Division
20	Millwall (R)	38	5	11	22	39	65	−26	26	Relegation to the Second Division

Source: World Football
Rules for classification: 1) Points; 2) Goal difference; 3) Goals scored
(R) Relegated

==== Results ====
First Division match results
Date	Opponent	Venue	Result F–A	Scorers	Attendance
19 August 1989	Norwich City	H	0–2		19,142
22 August 1989	Luton Town	A	0–2		9,503
26 August 1989	Chelsea	A	0–4		16,265
30 August 1989	Everton	H	1–1	Atkinson	19,657
9 September 1989	Arsenal	A	0–5		30,058
16 September 1989	Aston Villa	H	1–0	Atkinson	17,509
23 September 1989	Millwall	A	0–2		11,287
30 September 1989	Coventry City	H	0–0		15,054
14 October 1989	Manchester United	A	0–0		41,492
21 October 1989	Tottenham Hotspur	A	0–3		26,909
28 October 1989	Wimbledon	H	0–1		13,728
4 November 1989	Nottingham Forest	A	1–0	Wilson (o.g.)	21,864
11 November 1989	Charlton Athletic	H	3–0	Atkinson, Hirst (2)	16,740
18 November 1989	Derby County	A	0–2		18,085
25 November 1989	Crystal Palace	H	2–2	Whitton, Hirst (pen.)	17,227
29 November 1989	Liverpool	H	2–0	Hirst, Atkinson	32,732
2 December 1989	Norwich City	A	1–2	Hirst	15,341
9 December 1989	Luton Town	H	1–1	Dreyer (o.g.)	16,339
16 December 1989	Queens Park Rangers	H	2–0	Atkinson, Hirst	14,569
26 December 1989	Liverpool	A	1–2	Atkinson	37,488
30 December 1989	Southampton	A	2–2	Atkinson, Shirtliff	16,417
1 January 1990	Manchester City	H	2–0	Hirst, Pearson	28,756
14 January 1990	Chelsea	H	1–1	Atkinson	18,042
20 January 1990	Everton	A	0–2		25,545
3 February 1990	Millwall	H	1–1	Hirst	17,737
10 February 1990	Aston Villa	A	0–1		27,168
17 February 1990	Arsenal	H	1–0	Bould (o.g.)	20,640
24 February 1990	Crystal Palace	A	1–1	Worthington	11,857
3 March 1990	Derby County	H	1–0	Sheridan	21,811
17 March 1990	Coventry City	A	4–1	Hirst, Worthington, Sheridan, Atkinson	13,339
21 March 1990	Manchester United	H	1–0	Hirst	33,260
24 March 1990	Wimbledon	A	1–1	Shirtliff	5,034
31 March 1990	Tottenham Hotspur	H	2–4	Hirst, Atkinson	26,582
7 April 1990	Southampton	H	0–1		18,329
14 April 1990	Manchester City	A	1–2	Hirst	33,022
21 April 1990	Queens Park Rangers	A	0–1		10,448
28 April 1990	Charlton Athletic	A	2–1	Hirst (2)	7,029
5 May 1990	Nottingham Forest	H	0–3		29,762

=== FA Cup ===
FA Cup match results
Round	Date	Opponent	Venue	Result F–A	Scorers	Attendance
Third round	6 January 1990	Wolverhampton Wanderers	A	2–1	Shirtliff, Atkinson	23,800
Fourth round	28 January 1990	Everton	H	1–2	Hirst	31,754

=== Football League Cup ===
Football League Cup match results
Round	Date	Opponent	Venue	Result F–A	Scorers	Attendance
Second round, first leg	20 September 1989	Aldershot	H	0–0		9,237
Second round, second leg	3 October 1989	Aldershot	A	8–0	Whitton (4), Atkinson (3), Shakespeare	4,011
Third round	25 October 1989	Derby County	A	1–2	Hirst (pen.)	18,042

=== Full Members' Cup ===
Full Members' Cup match results
Round	Date	Opponent	Venue	Result F–A	Scorers	Attendance
Second round	21 November 1989	Sheffield United	H	3–2 (a.e.t.)	Atkinson, Palmer, Sheridan	30,464
Third round	20 December 1989	Middlesbrough	A	1–4	Bennett	8,716
