= Nigel Worthington =

Northern Irish footballer and manager

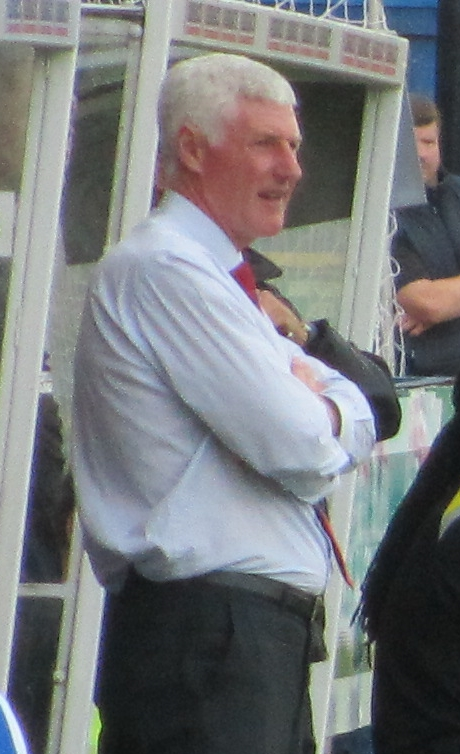
- Worthington as manager of York City in 2013

Personal information
- Full name: Nigel Worthington
- Date of birth: 4 November 1961 (age 64)
- Place of birth: Ballymena, Northern Ireland
- Height: 5 ft 11 in (1.80 m)
- Positions: Defender; midfielder

Senior career*
| Years | Team | Apps | (Gls) |
| 1979–1981 | Ballymena United | 80 | (4) |
| 1981–1984 | Notts County | 67 | (4) |
| 1984–1994 | Sheffield Wednesday | 338 | (12) |
| 1994–1996 | Leeds United | 43 | (1) |
| 1996–1997 | Stoke City | 12 | (0) |
| 1997–1998 | Blackpool | 9 | (0) |
| Total | | 549 | (21) |

International career
| | Northern Ireland U18 | 14 | (0) |
| 1984–1997 | Northern Ireland | 66 | (0) |

Managerial career
- 1997–1999: Blackpool
- 2000–2006: Norwich City
- 2007: Leicester City (caretaker)
- 2007–2011: Northern Ireland
- 2013–2014: York City
- * Club domestic league appearances and goals

Nigel Worthington (born 4 November 1961) is a Northern Irish former professional footballer who was most recently the manager of York City.

He played a defender and a midfielder, playing his club football for Ballymena United, Notts County, Sheffield Wednesday, Leeds United, Stoke City and Blackpool. With Sheffield Wednesday he won the League Cup in 1991. As an international player, he was capped 66 times for Northern Ireland, and appeared for them at the 1986 FIFA World Cup.

Worthington began his managerial career as player-manager of Blackpool in 1997 before he took over as manager of Norwich City in 2000. He guided Norwich into the Premier League in the 2003–04 season as First Division title winners. He left just over two years afterwards, having failed to keep them in the top-flight in 2005. He was briefly caretaker manager of Leicester City in 2007 prior to starting as manager of Northern Ireland, from which he stepped down in 2011.

== Club career ==
Born in Ballymena, County Antrim, Worthington played as a left-back and a midfielder and started his career with hometown team Ballymena United in 1979, where he was Ulster Football Writers Young Player of the Year in 1981. He moved into English football with Notts County on 1 July 1981 for a £100,000 fee.

Worthington signed for Sheffield Wednesday on 6 February 1984 for a £125,000 fee, and he stayed at the club for over 10 years. He earned promotion into the First Division with Wednesday in the 1983–84 season as Second Division runners-up. He was a member of the team that won the League Cup as well as a return into the First Division after finishing in third place in the Second Division in 1990–91. Two years later, Worthington and his teammates were losing finalists in the 1993 FA Cup Final.

Worthington left Wednesday to sign for Leeds United on 4 July 1994 for a £325,000 fee, spending two seasons at the club and one season at Stoke City, after signing on a free transfer on 18 July 1996.

== International career ==
Worthington was capped 14 times by the Northern Ireland national under-18 team before making his debut for the senior national team in a 1–1 draw away to Wales in the 1983–84 British Home Championship on 22 May 1984. This was notable for being Northern Ireland's final match in the last ever British Home Championship, the point gained being enough for Northern Ireland to win, and keep in perpetuity, the trophy. In Northern Ireland's subsequent successful qualifying campaign for the 1986 FIFA World Cup, Worthington started one qualifying match and came on as a substitute in three more. In the Finals tournament itself, Worthington started two of Northern Ireland's three matches, against Algeria and Spain. He served as Northern Ireland captain from 1995 to 1996. Worthington's 66th and final cap was gained in Northern Ireland's 3–0 victory in a home friendly against Belgium on 11 February 1997.

== Managerial career ==
=== Blackpool ===
Worthington's managerial career started as the player-manager at Blackpool on 8 July 1997. He soon retired from playing to take on sole managerial duties, but two and a half seasons in charge ended with his resignation on 23 December 1999 following a dip in form that saw the club lying in the Second Division relegation battle. "I have taken the club as far as I can," he stated.

=== Norwich City ===
After acting as assistant to Howard Wilkinson with the England under-21 team, Worthington moved to Norwich City on 27 June 2000 as assistant to Bryan Hamilton. He was given the role of assistant manager for the Northern Ireland national under-21 team on 22 August, which he shared with his duties at Norwich. He was appointed caretaker manager at Norwich on 4 December after Hamilton resigned, and on 2 January 2001 was appointed as permanent manager. He later saved the club from relegation into the Second Division. The 2001–02 season, Worthington's first full season, saw Norwich reach the 2002 First Division play-off final, in which they lost to Birmingham City in a penalty shoot-out.

In his third full season in charge, 2003–04, Worthington took Norwich into the Premier League after winning the First Division championship with a club record 94 points. With one match remaining in 2004–05, Norwich were one point above the relegation zone, but after a 6–0 defeat by Fulham were relegated in 19th place.

Norwich were tipped to make an instant return into the Premier League in 2005–06 having retained the majority of their squad. The team failed to mount the expected promotion challenge, which led to some supporters calling for Worthington to leave the club, with Norwich finishing the season ninth in the Championship table. After a defeat to Plymouth Argyle early in September 2006, Norwich's majority shareholders, Delia Smith and Michael Wynn-Jones, released a statement expecting Worthington to improve the team's performance in the following matches. Worthington was sacked by Norwich almost immediately after a 4–1 defeat to Burnley on 1 October, a result that left the team 17th in the table.

=== Leicester City ===
Worthington was appointed caretaker manager of relegation threatened Championship club Leicester City for the rest of 2006–07 on 11 April 2007. Despite losing his first match to former club Norwich, he was able to steer Leicester to safety and stated his desire to become Leicester's permanent manager. He lost out on the position to Martin Allen.

=== Northern Ireland ===
Worthington was appointed as manager of Northern Ireland on 1 June 2007, initially on a short-term contract until the end of the UEFA Euro 2008 qualifying campaign in November. At the time of his appointment, Northern Ireland led their qualification group. Although Northern Ireland eventually finished third in their qualification group, the Irish Football Association gave Worthington a two-year contract in January 2008. This was subsequently renewed in January 2010, lasting until the end of the UEFA Euro 2012 qualifying campaign. However, after a poor UEFA Euro 2012 qualification campaign he stepped down on 11 October 2011 after the final qualifier against Italy.

=== York City ===
Worthington was appointed manager of League Two club York City on 4 March 2013, after Gary Mills was sacked two days earlier. His first match in charge was a 3–2 defeat away to AFC Wimbledon on 9 March. On the last day of the season, York won 1–0 away to Dagenham & Redbridge, which secured the club's League Two status, finishing the season in 17th place. He signed a new one-year rolling contract on 3 May. Worthington managed the team that reached the League Two play-offs in 2013–14, in which York were beaten 1–0 on aggregate in the semi-final by Fleetwood Town. He resigned as manager on 13 October 2014 with the team one place above the relegation zone, and was quoted as saying "In recent weeks, performances have not been up to my high standards and I take full responsibility for this".

== Personal life ==
Worthington married Sandra Hopkins in Nottingham in 1983. His cousin is fellow manager Brendan Rodgers.

== Career statistics ==
=== Club ===
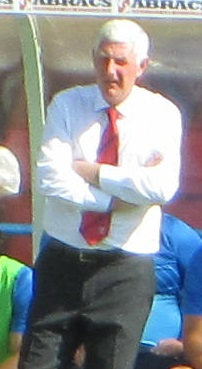
Worthington as manager of York City in 2013

Appearances and goals by club, season and competition
| Club | Season | League | | | FA Cup | | League Cup | | Other | | Total | |
| Club | Season | Division | Apps | Goals | Apps | Goals | Apps | Goals | Apps | Goals | Apps | Goals |
|---|---|---|---|---|---|---|---|---|---|---|---|---|
| Notts County | 1981–82 | First Division | 2 | 0 | 0 | 0 | 0 | 0 | 3 (Note: Appearances in Football League Group Cup) | 0 | 5 | 0 |
| Notts County | 1982–83 | First Division | 41 | 3 | 2 | 0 | 5 | 0 | — | | 48 | 3 |
| Notts County | 1983–84 | First Division | 24 | 1 | 2 | 0 | 6 | 0 | — | | 32 | 1 |
| Notts County | Total | | 67 | 4 | 4 | 0 | 11 | 0 | 3 | 0 | 85 | 4 |
| Sheffield Wednesday | 1983–84 | Second Division | 14 | 1 | — | | — | | — | | 14 | 1 |
| Sheffield Wednesday | 1984–85 | First Division | 38 | 1 | 3 | 0 | 6 | 0 | — | | 47 | 1 |
| Sheffield Wednesday | 1985–86 | First Division | 15 | 0 | 1 | 1 | 0 | 0 | — | | 16 | 1 |
| Sheffield Wednesday | 1986–87 | First Division | 35 | 0 | 5 | 0 | 2 | 0 | 1 (Note: Appearance(s) in Full Members Cup) | 0 | 43 | 0 |
| Sheffield Wednesday | 1987–88 | First Division | 38 | 0 | 4 | 0 | 5 | 0 | 1 | 0 | 48 | 0 |
| Sheffield Wednesday | 1988–89 | First Division | 28 | 0 | 0 | 0 | 2 | 0 | 0 | 0 | 30 | 0 |
| Sheffield Wednesday | 1989–90 | First Division | 32 | 2 | 2 | 0 | 3 | 0 | 2 | 0 | 39 | 2 |
| Sheffield Wednesday | 1990–91 | Second Division | 33 | 1 | 3 | 0 | 10 | 0 | 1 | 0 | 47 | 1 |
| Sheffield Wednesday | 1991–92 | First Division | 34 | 5 | 2 | 0 | 3 | 0 | 1 | 0 | 40 | 5 |
| Sheffield Wednesday | 1992–93 | Premier League | 40 | 1 | 8 | 0 | 7 | 1 | 3 (Note: Appearances in UEFA Cup) | 1 | 58 | 3 |
| Sheffield Wednesday | 1993–94 | Premier League | 31 | 1 | 1 | 0 | 3 | 0 | — | | 35 | 1 |
| Sheffield Wednesday | Total | | 338 | 12 | 29 | 1 | 41 | 1 | 9 | 1 | 417 | 15 |
| Leeds United | 1994–95 | Premier League | 27 | 1 | 4 | 0 | 2 | 0 | — | | 33 | 1 |
| Leeds United | 1995–96 | Premier League | 16 | 0 | 3 | 0 | 3 | 0 | 0 | 0 | 22 | 0 |
| Leeds United | Total | | 43 | 1 | 7 | 0 | 5 | 0 | 0 | 0 | 55 | 1 |
| Stoke City | 1996–97 | First Division | 12 | 0 | 0 | 0 | 3 | 1 | — | | 15 | 1 |
| Blackpool | 1997–98 | Second Division | 9 | 0 | 0 | 0 | 0 | 0 | — | | 9 | 0 |
| Career total | | | 469 | 17 | 40 | 1 | 60 | 2 | 12 | 1 | 581 | 21 |

=== International ===
Appearances and goals by national team and year
| National team | Year | Apps | Goals |
|---|---|---|---|
| Northern Ireland | 1984 | 3 | 0 |
| Northern Ireland | 1985 | 4 | 0 |
| Northern Ireland | 1986 | 5 | 0 |
| Northern Ireland | 1987 | 5 | 0 |
| Northern Ireland | 1988 | 7 | 0 |
| Northern Ireland | 1989 | 3 | 0 |
| Northern Ireland | 1990 | 4 | 0 |
| Northern Ireland | 1991 | 3 | 0 |
| Northern Ireland | 1992 | 6 | 0 |
| Northern Ireland | 1993 | 7 | 0 |
| Northern Ireland | 1994 | 6 | 0 |
| Northern Ireland | 1995 | 8 | 0 |
| Northern Ireland | 1996 | 3 | 0 |
| Northern Ireland | 1997 | 2 | 0 |
| Total | | 66 | 0 |

== Managerial statistics ==
As of 13 October 2014

Managerial record by team and tenure
| Team | From | To | Record | | | | | Ref |
| Team | From | To | P | W | D | L | Win % | Ref |
|---|---|---|---|---|---|---|---|---|
| Blackpool | 8 July 1997 | 23 December 1999 | 134 | 44 | 34 | 56 | 32.8 | |
| Norwich City | 4 December 2000 | 1 October 2006 | 280 | 114 | 62 | 104 | 40.7 | |
| Leicester City (caretaker) | 11 April 2007 | 25 May 2007 | 5 | 2 | 0 | 3 | 40.0 | |
| Northern Ireland | 1 June 2007 | 11 October 2011 | 41 | 9 | 10 | 22 | 22.0 | |
| York City | 4 March 2013 | 13 October 2014 | 76 | 23 | 29 | 24 | 30.3 | |
| Total | | | 536 | 192 | 135 | 209 | 35.8 | — |

== Honours ==
=== As a player ===
Ballymena United

- Irish Cup: 1980–81
- Ulster Cup: 1980–81

Sheffield Wednesday

- Football League Second Division runner-up: 1983–84
- Football League Second Division third-place promotion: 1990–91
- Football League Cup: 1990–91
- FA Cup runner-up: 1992–93

Leeds United

- Football League Cup runner-up: 1995–96

=== As a manager ===
Norwich City

- Football League First Division: 2003–04

Individual

- Football League Two Manager of the Month: April 2013, March 2014
