= 1993–94 Sheffield Wednesday F.C. season =

English football club season

Sheffield Wednesday
1993–94 season
- Chairman: Dave Richards
- Manager: Trevor Francis
- Stadium: Hillsborough
- Premier League: 7th
- FA Cup: Fourth round
- League Cup: Semi finals
- Top goalscorer: League: Mark Bright (19); All: Mark Bright (23)
- Average home league attendance: 27,186

During the 1993–94 English football season, Sheffield Wednesday competed in the FA Premier League.

== Season summary ==
Sheffield Wednesday finished seventh in the league for the second season running, but they could have finished even higher had key striker David Hirst not missed so much of the season due to injury. Young striker Gordon Watson proved himself to be a highly competent deputy, scoring 12 league goals in his first season as a regular player. Young academy striker Anthony Ward came into the ranks as a fringe first team player. Despite his goal scoring prowess for the reserve team struggled to break into the first team due to the form of the teams in form strikers.

Veterans Chris Waddle, Chris Woods and Mark Bright were also impressive, showing little sign of their advancing years, despite all three players now being in their 30s.

Wednesday's best success in 1993–94 came in the League Cup. They reached the semi-finals but were defeated by Manchester United in the semi-final, which included Ryan Giggs scoring a classic goal for United in the first leg. This ended any hope of the Owls winning a major trophy or qualifying for Europe. Trevor Francis responded to this disappointment by signing Klas Ingesson and Guy Whittingham to give the strikeforce some much-needed support. These reinforcements also gave Owls fans some much-needed hope of silverware, a year after they'd been on the losing side in both domestic cup finals.

== Final league table ==
Pos	Team	Pld	W	D	L	GF	GA	GD	Pts
5	Leeds United	42	18	16	8	65	39	+26	70
6	Wimbledon	42	18	11	13	56	53	+3	65
7	Sheffield Wednesday	42	16	16	10	76	54	+22	64
8	Liverpool	42	17	9	16	59	55	+4	60
9	Queens Park Rangers	42	16	12	14	62	61	+1	60

Source: Premier League
Rules for classification: 1) points; 2) goal difference; 3) number of goals scored.

== Results ==
Sheffield Wednesday's score comes first

=== Legend ===
Win	Draw	Loss

=== FA Premier League ===
Date	Opponent	Venue	Result	Attendance	Scorers
14 August 1993	Liverpool	A	0–2	44,004	
18 August 1993	Aston Villa	H	0–0	28,450	
21 August 1993	Arsenal	H	0–1	26,023	
25 August 1993	West Ham United	A	0–2	19,441	
28 August 1993	Chelsea	A	1–1	16,652	Bright
1 September 1993	Norwich City	H	3–3	25,175	Bart-Williams, Bright, Sinton
13 September 1993	Newcastle United	A	2–4	33,890	Sinton (2)
18 September 1993	Southampton	H	2–0	22,503	Sheridan (pen), Hirst
25 September 1993	Blackburn Rovers	A	1–1	13,917	Hyde
2 October 1993	Manchester United	H	2–3	34,548	Bright, Bart-Williams
16 October 1993	Wimbledon	H	2–2	21,752	Waddle, Jones
23 October 1993	Sheffield United	A	1–1	30,044	Palmer
30 October 1993	Leeds United	H	3–3	31,892	Jones, Waddle, Bright
6 November 1993	Ipswich Town	A	4–1	15,070	Jemson (2), Palmer, Bright
20 November 1993	Coventry City	H	0–0	23,379	
24 November 1993	Oldham Athletic	H	3–0	18,509	Watson (2), Jemson
27 November 1993	Manchester City	A	3–1	23,416	Jones (2), Jemson
4 December 1993	Liverpool	H	3–1	32,177	Bright, Ruddock (own goal), Wright (own goal)
8 December 1993	Aston Villa	A	2–2	20,304	Bart-Williams, Teale (own goal)
12 December 1993	Arsenal	A	0–1	22,026	
18 December 1993	West Ham United	H	5–0	26,350	Waddle, Bright, Jemson, Marsh (own goal), Palmer
27 December 1993	Everton	A	2–0	16,777	Bright, Palmer
29 December 1993	Swindon Town	H	3–3	30,570	Watson (2), Bright
1 January 1994	Queens Park Rangers	A	2–1	16,858	Watson, Bright
3 January 1994	Tottenham Hotspur	H	1–0	32,514	Bright
15 January 1994	Wimbledon	A	1–2	5,536	Pearce
22 January 1994	Sheffield United	H	3–1	34,959	Pearce, Bright, Watson
5 February 1994	Tottenham Hotspur	A	3–1	23,076	Coleman, Bright (2)
26 February 1994	Norwich City	A	1–1	18,311	Watson
5 March 1994	Newcastle United	H	0–1	33,153	
12 March 1994	Southampton	A	1–1	16,391	Bart-Williams
16 March 1994	Manchester United	A	0–5	43,669	
20 March 1994	Blackburn Rovers	H	1–2	24,655	Watson
30 March 1994	Chelsea	H	3–1	20,433	Bart-Williams, Palmer, Sheridan (pen)
2 April 1994	Everton	H	5–1	24,096	Bart-Williams, Jones, Worthington, Bright (2)
4 April 1994	Swindon Town	A	1–0	13,927	Watson
9 April 1994	Queens Park Rangers	H	3–1	22,437	Bright (2), Sheridan (pen)
16 April 1994	Coventry City	A	1–1	13,013	Jones
23 April 1994	Ipswich Town	H	5–0	23,457	Pearce, Watson, Bart-Williams, Linighan (own goal), Bright
30 April 1994	Oldham Athletic	A	0–0	12,973	
3 May 1994	Leeds United	A	2–2	33,575	Watson, Bart-Williams
7 May 1994	Manchester City	H	1–1	33,589	Watson

=== FA Cup ===
Round	Date	Opponent	Venue	Result	Attendance	Goalscorers
R3	8 January 1994	Nottingham Forest	H	1–1	32,488	Bright
R3R	19 January 1994	Nottingham Forest	A	2–0	25,268	Bart-Williams, Pearce
R4	29 January 1994	Chelsea	A	1–1	26,094	Hyde
R4R	9 February 1994	Chelsea	H	1–3 (a.e.t.)	26,144	Bright

=== League Cup ===
Round	Date	Opponent	Venue	Result	Attendance	Goalscorers
R2 1st leg	21 September 1993	Bolton Wanderers	A	1–1	11,590	Bart-Williams
R2 2nd leg	6 October 1993	Bolton Wanderers	H	1–0 (won 2–1 on agg)	16,194	A Ward
R3	27 October 1993	Middlesbrough	A	1–1	14,765	Palmer
R3R	10 November 1993	Middlesbrough	H	2–1	19,482	Palmer, Watson
R4	1 December 1993	Queens Park Rangers	A	2–1	13,253	Jemson, Jones
R5	11 January 1994	Wimbledon	A	2–1	8,784	Bright, Watson
SF 1st leg	13 February 1994	Manchester United	A	0–1	43,294	
SF 2nd leg	2 March 1994	Manchester United	H	1–4 (lost 1–5 on agg)	34,878	Hirst

== Players ==
=== First-team squad ===
Squad at end of season

Note: Flags indicate national team as defined under FIFA eligibility rules; some limited exceptions apply. Players may hold more than one non-FIFA nationality.

No.	Pos.	Nation	Player
1	GK	ENG	Chris Woods
2	DF	SWE	Roland Nilsson
3	DF	NIR	Nigel Worthington
4	MF	ENG	Carlton Palmer
5	DF	ENG	Nigel Pearson
6	DF	ENG	Brian Linighan
7	MF	AUS	Adem Poric (Note: Poric was born in London, England, but also qualified to represent Australia internationally and represented them at U-20 level.)
8	MF	ENG	Chris Waddle
9	FW	ENG	David Hirst
10	FW	ENG	Mark Bright
11	MF	IRL	John Sheridan (Note: Sheridan was born in Stretford, England, but also qualified to represent the Republic of Ireland internationally and represented them at U-21 level before making his international debut for the Republic of Ireland in 1988.)
12	DF	ENG	Andy Pearce
13	GK	ENG	Kevin Pressman
14	MF	ENG	Chris Bart-Williams (Note: Bart-Williams was born in Freetown, Sierra Leone, but was raised in England and represented them at U-21 and B level.)
15	MF	ENG	Andy Sinton

No.	Pos.	Nation	Player
16	MF	ENG	Graham Hyde
17	DF	ENG	Des Walker
18	DF	ENG	Phil King
19	FW	ENG	Nigel Jemson
20	FW	ENG	Gordon Watson
21	MF	WAL	Ryan Jones (Note: Jones was born in Sheffield, England, but also qualified to represent Wales internationally and made his international debut for Wales in May 1994.)
22	DF	ENG	Simon Stewart
23	GK	ENG	Lance Key
24	DF	ENG	Julian Watts
25	MF	ENG	Mike Williams
26	FW	ENG	Trevor Francis
27	MF	ENG	Steven Brown
28	DF	ENG	Simon Coleman
29	DF	ENG	Lee Briscoe

=== Left club during season ===
Note: Flags indicate national team as defined under FIFA eligibility rules; some limited exceptions apply. Players may hold more than one non-FIFA nationality.

No.	Pos.	Nation	Player
7	DF	ENG	Paul Warhurst (to Blackburn Rovers)

== Reserve squad ==
Note: Flags indicate national team as defined under FIFA eligibility rules; some limited exceptions apply. Players may hold more than one non-FIFA nationality.

No. / Pos. / Nation / Player; 14 / FW / ENG / Anthony Ward	No. / Pos. / Nation / Player; — / FW / ENG / Richie Barker
