= Chris Turner (footballer, born 1958) =

English footballer and manager

Personal information
- Full name: Christopher Robert Turner
- Date of birth: 15 September 1958 (age 68)
- Place of birth: Sheffield, England
- Height: 1.78 m (5 ft 10 in)
- Position: Goalkeeper

Youth career
- 1975–1976: Sheffield Wednesday

Senior career*
Years	Team	Apps	(Gls)
1976–1979	Sheffield Wednesday	91	(0)
1978	→ Lincoln City (loan)	5	(0)
1978–1985	Sunderland	195	(0)
1985–1988	Manchester United	64	(0)
1988–1991	Sheffield Wednesday	75	(0)
1989	→ Leeds United (loan)	2	(0)
1991–1994	Leyton Orient	58	(0)
Total		490	(0)

International career
1977	England Youth	5	(0)

Managerial career
- 1994–1995: Leyton Orient (co-manager)
- 1999–2002: Hartlepool United
- 2002–2004: Sheffield Wednesday
- 2004–2005: Stockport County
- 2008–2010: Hartlepool United
- * Club domestic league appearances and goals

Christopher Robert Turner (born 15 September 1958) is an English former footballer and former director of football at Wakefield. He made 589 league and cup appearances in a 19-year career as a professional in the English Football League and then took charge of a further 469 matches as a manager.

A goalkeeper, he began his career at hometown club Sheffield Wednesday, winning the club's Player of the Year award in his debut season in 1977–78. He then won a place on the PFA Team of the Year the following season and also played on loan at Lincoln City before being sold to Sunderland for £80,000 in July 1979. He helped Sunderland to win promotion out of the Second Division in 1979–80, and in 1985 played on the losing side in the League Cup final, before he was named as the club's Player of the Year. He was signed by Manchester United for a £275,000 fee in July 1985. He was sold back to Sheffield Wednesday for £175,000 in September 1988. The following year, he briefly played on loan at Leeds United. He helped Wednesday to win promotion out of the Second Division in 1990–91. He kept a clean sheet against former club Manchester United as Wednesday won the League Cup in 1991. He was moved on to Leyton Orient for £75,000 in 1991 and again named on the PFA Team of the Year in 1991–92.

He began his managerial career at Leyton Orient in August 1994, working alongside John Sitton. The pair were sacked in April 1995, and he coached at Leicester City and Wolverhampton Wanderers before being appointed manager at Hartlepool United in February 1999. He turned the club from relegation candidates to consistent play-off challengers and was lured to Sheffield Wednesday in November 2002. He lasted 22 months at the job before being sacked in September 2004. He took charge at Stockport County three months later but was again unsuccessful and left the club by mutual consent in December 2005. He returned to Hartlepool United as Director of Sport in February 2006 before being named first-team manager in December 2008. He resigned in August 2010 and went on to work behind the scenes at Chesterfield, Port Vale and Wakefield.

== Playing career ==
=== Sheffield Wednesday ===
Born in Sheffield, Turner began his goalkeeping career at Sheffield Wednesday, turning professional in August 1976. He was capped at England Youth level. He enjoyed a highly successful debut season, winning the club's Player of the Year award for his performances across his 52 appearances as Len Ashurst's Owls posted an eighth-place finish in the Third Division in the 1976–77 campaign. Wednesday slipped to 14th-place in the 1977–78 season, and Turner was limited to 31 appearances as new manager Jack Charlton looked for a larger-sized goalkeeper in Bob Bolder. Wednesday again finished 14th in 1978–79. Turner played 32 games at Hillsborough, whilst also spending a five-game loan spell at bottom club Lincoln City. He was voted onto the PFA Team of the Year, alongside teammate Brian Hornsby. Despite this award, Charlton sold Turner on to Sunderland for £80,000 in July 1979.

=== Sunderland ===
Ken Knighton led the Rokerites to promotion out of the Second Division in 1979–80 – they finished runners-up, just a point behind champions Leicester City – with Turner playing 30 of the club's 42 league games as he fended off competition from Barry Siddall. He then featured 31 times as they consolidated their First Division status with a 17th-place finish. New manager Alan Durban then led Sunderland to a 19th-place finish in 1981–82, with Turner being limited to only 19 league appearances. He regained his first-team status in the 1982–83 season, playing 41 matches as Sunderland posted a 16th-place finish; during the season, he managed to keep six clean sheets in a row. Len Ashurst took charge for the end of the 1983–84 campaign, and kept faith in Turner, who ended the season with 48 appearances to his name. He featured 53 times across the 1984–85 campaign, his last one at Roker Park, as Sunderland were relegated in 21st-place. Sunderland did also make it to the League Cup final at Wembley Stadium in 1985, but lost 1–0 to Norwich City after Gordon Chisholm deflected Asa Hartford's shot past Turner just after half-time. The campaign did end on a positive note on a personal level for Turner, as supporters voted him the club's Player of the Year.

=== Manchester United ===
In July 1985, Ron Atkinson signed Turner for a £275,000 fee to challenge Gary Bailey for the number one shirt at Manchester United. Turner played 22 of the club's 56 matches in the 1985–86 campaign, helping the Red Devils to a fourth-place finish. He was on the bench as United lost the 1985 FA Charity Shield to Everton. Bailey was injured for most of the 1986–87 season, but Turner could only make it to 29 appearances as youth team goalkeeper Gary Walsh established himself in the first-team at Old Trafford. Turner was placed on the transfer-list by new manager Alex Ferguson, but still went on to make 30 appearances in the 1987–88 season before his place was taken by incoming Aberdeen goalkeeper Jim Leighton.

=== Return to Sheffield Wednesday ===
Turner returned to Sheffield Wednesday, who had struggled in the First Division under Peter Eustace, for a £175,000 fee in September 1988. Ironically, Eustace was replaced by Ron Atkinson, who managed to keep Wednesday three points above the relegation zone at the end of the 1988–89 season. Turner played 23 of the club's 38 league games in the 1989–90 season, as Wednesday dropped out of the top-flight on goal difference. He also spent a two-game spell on loan at Howard Wilkinson's Second Division Leeds United, providing cover for the injured Mervyn Day. Wednesday made an immediate return to the First Division after securing the third automatic promotion place at the end of the 1990–91 season. Turner also kept goal in the 1991 League Cup final, and kept a clean sheet in a 1–0 victory over former club Manchester United.

=== Leyton Orient ===
However, Turner did not return to the top flight and instead dropped down to the Third Division to sign for Leyton Orient to be reunited with former Wednesday manager Eustace, who paid a fee of £75,000. The O's finished in tenth place at the end of the 1991–92 campaign in what was Turner's final season as a guaranteed number one. He was voted onto the PFA Team of the Year for the second time in his career. He was limited to 20 appearances in the 1992–93 season, as Orient missed out on the play-offs on goal difference. He played just eight games of the 1993–94 season and featured once in the 1994–95 campaign, by which time he had been elevated to joint-manager.

== Style of play ==
Turner was an agile goalkeeper with good reflex shot-stopping ability and good handling, though he lacked a physical presence.

== Managerial career ==
=== Leyton Orient ===
Turner started his managerial career at Leyton Orient as joint-manager with John Sitton at the start of the 1994–95 season. The campaign was unsuccessful, as Orient were relegated out of the Second Division in last place, and new chairman Barry Hearn sacked the pair on 20 April 1995. After leaving Brisbane Road, Turner was appointed as reserve team coach at Leicester City by manager Mark McGhee, and later moved with McGhee to Wolverhampton Wanderers, where he was appointed youth team coach.

=== Hartlepool United ===
Turner was appointed manager at Hartlepool United by chairman Ken Hodcroft on 24 February 1999, who were sitting bottom of the Football League following Mick Tait's departure. He proved to be an instant success at Victoria Park, keeping the Monkey Hangers two places and three points ahead of Scarborough, who were relegated into non-League football and never to return at the end of the 1998–99 season following a real upturn in form. He then led Pools to a seventh-place finish in 1999–2000, though a 3–0 aggregate defeat to Darlington in the play-off semi-finals saw them remain in the Third Division. He was named as Third Division Manager of the Month for January 2001. Hartlepool narrowly missed out on a place in the automatic promotion places in 2000–01 and ended up losing 5–1 on aggregate to Blackpool in the play-off semi-finals. More play-off heartbreak followed in 2001–02; this time, they took Cheltenham Town to penalties after two legs of the semi-finals. He left the club, sitting top of the table, to manage his boyhood club on 7 November 2002, leaving Mike Newell to complete the task of securing promotion for Hartlepool.

=== Sheffield Wednesday ===
Turner took charge at Sheffield Wednesday 26 years after first making his debut for the club. He was unable to save the club from relegation to the third tier at the end of the 2002–03 season, and later said it was "virtually a no-win situation" and that it was "like trying to build a shed without the tools. We had a lot of blunt tools, but no sharp ones". They also struggled to adapt in the Second Division, and ended the 2003–04 campaign in 16th-place and were the division's lowest scorers with 48 goals. He released 13 players in May 2004. Turner was sacked on 18 September 2004 after a slow start to the League One campaign left Wednesday languishing in 14th-place. He stated that "I've given it everything I had – we just needed more time". His successor, Paul Sturrock, steered the club to promotion at the end of the 2004–05 season, ironically beating Turner's former club Hartlepool in the play-off final.

=== Stockport County ===
Turner returned to management with Stockport County on 19 December 2004, who were bottom of League One. He was unable to turn the "Hatters" around, and County ended the 2004–05 season relegated in last place. They went on to struggle in League Two, and Turner left the club by mutual consent on 27 December 2005, with Stockport now five points adrift at the bottom of the Football League. His replacement at Edgeley Park, Jim Gannon, managed to keep Stockport out of the relegation zone at the end of the 2005–06 season.

=== Return to Hartlepool ===
In February 2006, Turner returned to Hartlepool United in the newly created position of Director of Sport, with Paul Stephenson working as caretaker manager; Turner's role left him to administer "the club's overseas participation in football tournaments, pre-season planning, conferences and Football League issues". On 15 December 2008, Turner took over as caretaker manager at Hartlepool following the departure of Danny Wilson, in addition to his Director of Sport role at the club. He then led Hartlepool to a 19th-place finish in League One at the end of the 2008–09 season, two places and one point above the relegation zone. Speaking in January 2010, Turner responded to criticism from supporters by saying that "people have to realise to get into the top six is very difficult for the majority of clubs in this division". Pools ended the 2009–10 campaign above the relegation zone on goal difference after being deducted three points for fielding an ineligible player as Gary Liddle played against Brighton & Hove Albion when he should have served a suspension. On 19 August 2010, Turner resigned from his position at Hartlepool. He had previously stated his frustration at what he said was a lack of funds to sign players. Over the summer he had released eight players but was only able to make four new signings. His successor, Mick Wadsworth, took the club to a 16th-place finish at the end of the 2010–11 season.

=== Later career ===
In October 2010, Turner fronted an ultimately unsuccessful bid to purchase Sheffield Wednesday. He went on to become chief executive of Chesterfield in December 2011, replacing Carol Wilby. He switched roles to director of football in January 2017, before he was made redundant two months later. He applied to take charge at Hartlepool for a third time in May 2017, citing 'unfinished business', but was unsuccessful. He was appointed as the new sales and marketing manager at Port Vale in November 2017. He left the role in June 2018 after being informed of the club's decision to make a change.

Turner helped to found a new club Wakefield A.F.C. in 2019 and was appointed as director of football.

== Career statistics ==
=== Playing statistics ===
Appearances and goals by club, season and competition
Club	Season	League			FA Cup		Other^{[A]}		Total	
Club	Season	Division	Apps	Goals	Apps	Goals	Apps	Goals	Apps	Goals
Sheffield Wednesday	1976–77	Third Division	45	0	2	0	5	0	52	0
Sheffield Wednesday	1977–78	Third Division	23	0	2	0	6	0	31	0
Sheffield Wednesday	1978–79	Third Division	23	0	9	0	0	0	32	0
Sheffield Wednesday	Total		91	0	13	0	11	0	115	0
Lincoln City (loan)	1978–79	Third Division	5	0	0	0	0	0	5	0
Sunderland	1979–80	Second Division	30	0	0	0	2	0	32	0
Sunderland	1980–81	First Division	27	0	2	0	2	0	31	0
Sunderland	1981–82	First Division	19	0	0	0	0	0	19	0
Sunderland	1982–83	First Division	35	0	2	0	4	0	41	0
Sunderland	1983–84	First Division	42	0	2	0	4	0	48	0
Sunderland	1984–85	First Division	42	0	1	0	10	0	53	0
Sunderland	Total		195	0	7	0	22	0	224	0
Manchester United	1985–86	First Division	17	0	3	0	2	0	22	0
Manchester United	1986–87	First Division	23	0	2	0	4	0	29	0
Manchester United	1987–88	First Division	24	0	3	0	3	0	30	0
Manchester United	Total		64	0	8	0	9	0	81	0
Sheffield Wednesday	1988–89	First Division	29	0	2	0	2	0	33	0
Sheffield Wednesday	1989–90	First Division	23	0	2	0	1	0	26	0
Sheffield Wednesday	1990–91	Second Division	23	0	4	0	4	0	31	0
Sheffield Wednesday	Total		75	0	8	0	7	0	90	0
Leeds United (loan)	1989–90	Second Division	2	0	0	0	0	0	2	0
Leyton Orient	1991–92	Third Division	34	0	5	0	4	0	43	0
Leyton Orient	1992–93	Second Division	17	0	1	0	2	0	20	0
Leyton Orient	1993–94	Second Division	6	0	0	0	2	0	8	0
Leyton Orient	1994–95	Second Division	1	0	0	0	0	0	1	0
Leyton Orient	Total		58	0	6	0	8	0	72	0
Career total			490	0	42	0	57	0	589	0

A. The "Other" column constitutes appearances and goals in the League Cup, Football League play-offs and Full Members Cup.

=== Managerial statistics ===
Managerial record by team and tenure
Team	From	To	Record					Ref
Team	From	To	G	W	D	L	Win %	Ref
Leyton Orient (co-manager)	1 August 1994	20 April 1995	47	7	9	31	14.89	
Hartlepool United	24 February 1999	7 November 2002	194	82	48	64	42.27	
Sheffield Wednesday	7 November 2002	19 September 2004	96	29	31	36	30.21	
Stockport County	19 December 2004	26 December 2005	51	7	15	29	13.73	
Hartlepool United	15 December 2008	19 August 2010	81	23	19	39	28.40	
Total			469	148	122	199	31.56	

== Honours ==
=== Playing ===
Sunderland

- Football League Second Division second-place promotion: 1979–80
- Football League Cup runner-up: 1984–85

Sheffield Wednesday

- Football League Second Division third-place promotion: 1990–91
- Football League Cup: 1990–91

Individual

- Sheffield Wednesday Player of the Year: 1976–77
- PFA Team of the Year: 1978–79 Third Division, 1991–92 Third Division
- Sunderland Player of the Year: 1984–85

=== Managerial ===
Individual

- Football League Third Division Manager of the Month: January 2001
