= War of the Monster Trucks =

Sheffield Wednesday fan magazine

War of the Monster Trucks is a fanzine for the English football club Sheffield Wednesday.

Brainchild of David Richards and Matthew Cooper, War of the Monster Trucks was launched in 1993 with the headline Lucan Alive! Found in Sheffield United Trophy Room.

The name of the fanzine was derived from the events of 21 April 1991, when Yorkshire Television elected to show the 1986 TV special War of the Monster Trucks in preference to the post-match celebrations of Sheffield Wednesday's famous and unlikely 1–0 League Cup Final victory over Manchester United. This acrimonious decision has been cited over the years by both Sheffield Wednesday and Sheffield United fans as a prime example of Yorkshire Television's bias towards West Yorkshire in general and Leeds in particular.

The fanzine was launched at a time when the club had managed to win its first trophy in over fifty years, finish third in the First Division and reach the final of two major cup competitions in the same year.

The fanzine was co-edited by Richards and Cooper for several years before passing to Paul Taylor. Andy Selman, Nick Riley and Steve Walmsley. Though losing some of its early "fizz" the fanzine ran for several years as a paper fanzine and then moved online.
