= 1991 Football League Cup final =

- Event: 1990–91 Football League Cup
Manchester United	Sheffield Wednesday
0	1
- Date: 21 April 1991
- Venue: Wembley Stadium, London
- Man of the Match: Nigel Pearson (Sheffield Wednesday)
- Referee: Ray Lewis (Surrey)
- Attendance: 77,612
- Weather: Cloudy; 16 °C (61 °F)

The 1991 Football League Cup final was a football match played on 21 April 1991 between Manchester United and Sheffield Wednesday. It was the first of two years that the Football League Cup competition in English football was sponsored by Rumbelows.

In the route to the final, Sheffield Wednesday beat Chelsea 5–1 on aggregate in the semi-finals, while Manchester United beat Leeds United 3–1.

Despite the previous season's FA Cup winners, Manchester United (led by Ferguson), being favourites to lift the trophy, Second Division side Sheffield Wednesday won the match 1–0, the winning goal scored by John Sheridan, giving the Owls their first League Cup title in a season when they also won promotion back to the top flight on their first attempt after being relegated the season before. The match is regarded as one of the most memorable League Cup finals of all time.

As of 2026, it is the last time a team from outside the top flight won the League Cup or any major English domestic trophy.

The trophy was presented to Wednesday skipper Nigel Pearson by Rumbelows employee of the year Tracy Bateman. Pearson was also named man of the match.

== Route to the final ==
The Football League Cup is a cup competition open to clubs in The Football League. It is played on a knockout basis with the first, second and semi-final rounds being contested over a two-legged tie, rounds three to five are settled on the day with replays and possibly extra time required to determine the winner. As clubs in the top two divisions of The Football League, both teams entered the competition in the second round.

=== Manchester United ===
Manchester United's second-round tie saw them drawn against Fourth Division team Halifax Town; they won the first leg at The Shay 3–1, with goals from Clayton Blackmore, Brian McClair and Neil Webb, before Viv Anderson and Steve Bruce gave them a 2–1 win at Old Trafford and a 5–2 aggregate victory. Anderson, who was by now rarely used in the United first team, went on to be sold to Sheffield Wednesday three months later, his appearance for United in the early stages of the competition making him ineligible for Wednesday's matches and denying him the chance to add to the two League Cup medals he had won with Nottingham Forest and a later medal in the competition won with Arsenal.

They were then drawn against rivals and reigning First Division champions Liverpool in the third round, where Mark Hughes and Lee Sharpe joined Bruce on the score sheet in a 3–1 home win. In the fourth round, a 19-year-old Sharpe scored a hat-trick in addition to goals from Blackmore, Hughes and Danny Wallace to give United a 6–2 away win over Arsenal, who would go on to win the First Division title that season, just over a month after the two teams had been involved in a mass brawl during a 1–0 Arsenal win at Old Trafford that saw both teams deducted points.

In the fifth round, United were held to a 1–1 draw away to Southampton, Hughes scoring their only goal; Hughes was again the only United player on the score sheet in the replay a week later, scoring a hat-trick in a 3–2 win that put them into the semi-finals. Southampton striker Alan Shearer, who within months was reported to be transfer target for Manchester United, scoring all of Southampton's goals during the two cup clashes with United.

Goals from McClair and Sharpe gave United a 2–1 win in the first leg of the semi-final at home to Leeds United, and Sharpe scored again in the second leg – his sixth League Cup goal of the season – as United won 1–0, and 3–1 on aggregate, to put them into their second League Cup final.

=== Sheffield Wednesday ===
Sheffield Wednesday, whose last major honour had been the FA Cup in 1935, were fresh from relegation to the Second Division when they were drawn against Third Division Brentford in the second round, winning 2–1 in each of the two legs to put them into the third round. There they met fellow Second Division side Swindon Town, who held them to a goalless draw at Hillsborough, before succumbing to a 1–0 defeat at the County Ground in the replay a week later. Wednesday required another replay in the fourth round, after they played out another draw at home to Derby County, but beat them 2–1 at the Baseball Ground two weeks later.

The quarter-final saw Wednesday drawn away to Coventry City, where a 1–0 victory for Wednesday ended any hopes that Coventry's new player-manager Terry Butcher might have had of beginning his managerial career with silverware. Their semi-final opponents were Chelsea. The first leg of the semi-final was played at Stamford Bridge, where goals from Peter Shirtliff and David Hirst gave them a 2–0 win, before Nigel Pearson, Danny Wilson and Paul Williams gave them a 3–1 win in the second leg at Hillsborough to put them into the final, 5–1 on aggregate. It was Wednesday's first Wembley cup final in 25 years.

== Match details ==
21 April 1991
15:00

Manchester United	0–1	Sheffield Wednesday
		Sheridan 37'

Wembley Stadium, London
Attendance: 77,612
Referee: Ray Lewis (Surrey)

Manchester United	Sheffield Wednesday

GK	1	(England) Les Sealey
RB	2	(Republic of Ireland) Denis Irwin
LB	3	(Wales) Clayton Blackmore
CB	4	(England) Steve Bruce
RM	5	(England) Neil Webb	(substituted off) 55'
CB	6	(England) Gary Pallister
CM	7	(England) Bryan Robson (c)
CM	8	(England) Paul Ince
CF	9	(Scotland) Brian McClair
CF	10	(Wales) Mark Hughes
LM	11	(England) Lee Sharpe
Substitutes:
DF	12	(Northern Ireland) Mal Donaghy
MF	14	(England) Mike Phelan	(substituted on) 55'
Manager:
(Scotland) Alex Ferguson

GK	1	(England) Chris Turner
RB	2	(Sweden) Roland Nilsson
LB	3	(England) Phil King
CM	4	(United States) John Harkes	(substituted off) 87'
CB	5	(England) Peter Shirtliff
CB	6	(England) Nigel Pearson (c)
RM	7	(Northern Ireland) Danny Wilson
CM	8	(Republic of Ireland) John Sheridan
CF	9	(England) David Hirst
CF	10	(England) Paul Williams
LM	11	(Northern Ireland) Nigel Worthington
Substitutes:
FW	12	(England) Trevor Francis
DF	14	(England) Lawrie Madden	(substituted on) 87'
Manager:
(England) Ron Atkinson

Man of the Match
Nigel Pearson (Sheffield Wednesday)

Linesmen

- Mike Bullivant (Cambridgeshire)
- James Biddle (West Midlands)

Reserve official

- Terry Holbrook (West Midlands)

== Yorkshire Television controversy ==
The broadcast of this League Cup final caused controversy in Yorkshire, where instead of showing the post-match celebrations (as London Weekend Television did), Yorkshire Television decided to cut the broadcast short to show a programme titled War of the Monster Trucks. People from Sheffield often cite this event as a demonstration of the station's bias towards West Yorkshire, Leeds and above all Leeds United. The incident inspired the name of the Sheffield Wednesday fanzine War of the Monster Trucks.
