= Peter Shirtliff =

English footballer (born 1961)

Personal information
- Full name: Peter Andrew Shirtliff
- Date of birth: 6 April 1961 (age 65)
- Place of birth: Hoyland, Barnsley, England
- Height: 6 ft 2 in (1.88 m)
- Position: Central defender

Youth career
- Sheffield Wednesday

Senior career*
Years	Team	Apps	(Gls)
1979–1986	Sheffield Wednesday	188	(4)
1986–1989	Charlton Athletic	103	(7)
1989–1993	Sheffield Wednesday	104	(4)
1993–1995	Wolverhampton Wanderers	69	(0)
1995–1997	Barnsley	49	(0)
1996	→ Carlisle United (loan)	5	(0)
Total		518	(15)

Managerial career
- 1994: Wolverhampton Wanderers (caretaker manager)
- 2005–2006: Mansfield Town
- 2012: Bury (caretaker manager)
- * Club domestic league appearances and goals

Peter Andrew Shirtliff (born 6 April 1961) is an English football coach and former player. As a player, he made more than 500 appearances in the Football League playing as a central defender for Sheffield Wednesday, Charlton Athletic, Wolverhampton Wanderers, Barnsley and Carlisle United. He has managed Mansfield Town, and was appointed as a first-team coach at Swindon Town in 2019.

== Career ==
Shirtliff was born in Hoyland, near Barnsley. He began his football career with Sheffield Wednesday, where in two spells with the club he achieved promotion from the Second Division in 1983–84, a third-place finish in the First Division in the 1991–92 season, and a League Cup-winners' medal in 1991, but missed the 1993 League Cup and FA Cup finals with a broken arm. He played more than 350 games for the club in all competitions. After his first spell with Wednesday, he joined Charlton Athletic, where his two goals in the last 10 minutes of extra time in the 1986–87 playoff final replay against Leeds kept the club in the First Division. He also played for Wolverhampton Wanderers, Barnsley and Carlisle United).

Shirtliff retired from the game in 1997, shortly after helping Barnsley reach the Premier League, after 18 years as a professional footballer. He has since been youth team coach at Barnsley and Leicester City. In 2005, he was appointed assistant manager at Mansfield Town. He became the manager of Mansfield following the dismissal of Carlton Palmer in September 2005, and lasted 15 months in the job before getting sacked in December 2006 following a poor run of results.

In 2007, he was appointed assistant manager at Tranmere Rovers, and two years later took up the equivalent post at Swindon Town. He was also assistant manager and caretaker manager of Bury before departing in 2013.

== Personal life ==
His younger brother Paul was also a professional footballer.

== Honours ==
Sheffield Wednesday

- Football League Cup: 1990–91
