= Paul Williams (footballer, born 1965) =

English footballer

Personal information
- Full name: Paul Anthony Williams
- Date of birth: 16 August 1965 (age 61)
- Place of birth: Stratford, London, England
- Height: 5 ft 7 in (1.70 m)
- Position: Striker

Senior career*
Years	Team	Apps	(Gls)
- Aveley
- Clapton
–1987	Woodford Town		
1987–1990	Charlton Athletic	82	(23)
1987	→ Brentford (loan)	7	(3)
1990–1992	Sheffield Wednesday	93	(25)
1992–1995	Crystal Palace	46	(7)
1995	→ Sunderland (loan)	3	(0)
1995	→ Birmingham City (loan)	11	(0)
1995–1996	Charlton Athletic	9	(0)
1996	→ Torquay United (loan)	9	(0)
1996–1998	Southend United	40	(7)
1998–2000	Canvey Island	25	(14)

International career
1989	England U21	4	(3)
1989–1990	England B	3	(0)
- * Club domestic league appearances and goals

Paul Anthony Williams (born 16 August 1965) is an English football coach and former professional footballer who played as a striker.

As a player he made 300 appearances in the Premier League for Crystal Palace as well as in the Football League for Charlton Athletic, Brentford, Sheffield Wednesday, Sunderland, Birmingham City, Torquay United and Southend United. He retired in 2000 whilst with Non-league side Canvey Island. He was capped by England at under-21 and B international level.

Since retiring from playing Williams returned to former clubs Charlton Athletic and Crystal Palace where he was an academy coach before emigrating to Florida to coach youth soccer and run personalized trainings.

== Playing career ==
Born in Stratford, East London, Williams was signed by First Division Charlton Athletic from non-league Woodford Town in 1987. Where he was top goal scorer for two successive seasons. This prompted Ron Atkinson to spend nearly a million pounds to bring the Londoner to Sheffield Wednesday in 1990, where he enjoyed a productive partnership with David Hirst. That season he won a League Cup medal at Wembley Stadium when Wednesday defeated Manchester United 1–0. In the same season, Wednesday achieved promotion back to the First Division. Williams moved back to London with Crystal Palace in 1992, in a swap deal involving Mark Bright. In season 1993–94 he won a Football League First Division (second tier) winners medal with Crystal Palace and was second top goal scorer behind Chris Armstrong.

After loans with Sunderland and Birmingham City he returned to Charlton Athletic, followed by a few months at Torquay United before ending his league career with Southend United in 1998, due to injuries.

From there, Williams went on to complete two very successful years playing and coaching at Canvey Island. While there, the club gained consecutive promotions and won two league Cups. His professional career ended in late 2000 when he announced his retirement.

== Coaching career ==
Williams continued coaching at the Charlton and Crystal Palace youth academies, before moving to South Florida in 2012, where he was the director of the Florida Fire Juniors who were affiliated with MLS team Chicago Fire, and he was the coach for several teams in the Naples area like Azzurri Storm, who are affiliated with Orlando City. He also runs personalized trainings in a program called "Premier Soccer Academy", and was the head coach of Seacrest Country Day School's soccer team.

== Honours ==
Sheffield Wednesday

- Football League Cup: 1990–91

Crystal Palace

- Football League First Division: 1993–94
