= 1988–89 Sheffield Wednesday F.C. season =

English football club season

Sheffield Wednesday
1988–89 season
- Manager: Howard Wilkinson (until 10 October 1988); Peter Eustace (from 28 October 1988)
- Stadium: Hillsborough Stadium
- First Division: 15th
- FA Cup: Fourth round (eliminated by Blackburn Rovers)
- League Cup: Second round (eliminated by Blackpool)
- Full Members' Cup: Third round (eliminated by Queens Park Rangers)

The 1988–89 season was Sheffield Wednesday's 87th season in the Football League, and their fifth consecutive season in the Football League First Division, the top tier of English football, where they finished 15th. The club also participated in the FA Cup and Football League Cup, being eliminated in the fourth round of the former and the second round of the latter.

== Competitions ==
=== First Division ===
==== League table ====
Pos	Team	Pld	W	D	L	GF	GA	GD	Pts
13	Southampton	38	10	15	13	52	66	−14	45
14	Charlton Athletic	38	10	12	16	44	58	−14	42
15	Sheffield Wednesday	38	10	12	16	34	51	−17	42
16	Luton Town	38	10	11	17	42	52	−10	41
17	Aston Villa	38	9	13	16	45	56	−11	40

Source: World Football
Rules for classification: 1) Points; 2) Goal difference; 3) Goals scored

==== Matches ====
First Division match results
Date	Opponent	Venue	Result F–A	Scorers	Attendance
27 August 1988	Luton Town	H	1–0	Sterland	16,433
3 September 1988	Nottingham Forest	A	1–1	Sterland	18,963
10 September 1988	Coventry City	H	1–2	Hirst	15,633
17 September 1988	Queens Park Rangers	A	0–2		8,011
24 September 1988	Arsenal	H	2–1	Megson, Pearson	17,830
1 October 1988	Aston Villa	H	1–0	Hirst	18,301
22 October 1988	Southampton	A	2–1	Varadi, Reeves	12,725
29 October 1988	Charlton Athletic	A	1–2	Hodgson	5,933
5 November 1988	Everton	H	1–1	Sterland	21,761
12 November 1988	Norwich City	A	1–1	Sterland	14,353
20 November 1988	Tottenham Hotspur	H	0–2		15,386
23 November 1988	Manchester United	A	1–1	West	30,867
26 November 1988	Middlesbrough	A	1–0	Sterland	19,310
3 December 1988	Derby County	H	1–1	Sterland	20,609
10 December 1988	West Ham United	A	0–0		16,676
17 December 1988	Millwall	A	0–1		11,197
26 December 1988	Newcastle United	H	1–2	Hirst	25,573
31 December 1988	Nottingham Forest	H	0–3		20,407
2 January 1989	Coventry City	A	0–5		15,191
14 January 1989	Liverpool	H	2–2	Proctor, Varadi	31,524
21 January 1989	Arsenal	A	1–1	Varadi	33,490
4 February 1989	Aston Villa	A	0–2		19,334
11 February 1989	Manchester United	H	0–2		34,820
18 February 1989	Southampton	H	1–1	Proctor	16,677
25 February 1989	Wimbledon	A	0–1		4,384
4 March 1989	Charlton Athletic	H	3–1	Hirst, Jonsson, Galvin	16,081
11 March 1989	Everton	A	0–1		22,542
18 March 1989	Luton Town	A	1–0	Hirst	7,776
25 March 1989	Queens Park Rangers	H	0–2		18,804
27 March 1989	Newcastle United	A	3–1	Barrick, Pearson, Hirst	31,040
1 April 1989	Millwall	H	3–0	Palmer, Whitton (2)	18,358
5 April 1989	Wimbledon	H	1–1	Hirst	15,777
8 April 1989	Liverpool	A	1–5	Barrick	39,672
12 April 1989	Tottenham Hotspur	A	0–0		17,270
22 April 1989	Derby County	A	0–1		17,529
9 May 1989	West Ham United	H	0–2		19,905
13 May 1989	Middlesbrough	H	1–0	Whitton	20,582
17 May 1989	Norwich City	H	2–2	Linighan (o.g.), Reeves	16,238

=== FA Cup ===
FA Cup match results
Round	Date	Opponent	Venue	Result F–A	Scorers	Attendance
Third round	7 January 1989	Torquay United	H	5–1	Jonsson, Hodgson, Varadi (2), Proctor	11,384
Fourth round	28 January 1989	Blackburn Rovers	A	1–2	Hirst	16,235

=== Football League Cup ===
Football League Cup match results
Round	Date	Opponent	Venue	Result F–A	Scorers	Attendance
Second round, first leg	27 September 1988	Blackpool	A	0–2		5,492
Second round, second leg	12 October 1988	Blackpool	H	3–1 (a.e.t.)	Varadi, Reeves, Hirst	12,237

=== Full Members' Cup ===
Full Members' Cup match results
Round	Date	Opponent	Venue	Result F–A	Scorers	Attendance
Third round	1 February 1989	Queens Park Rangers	H	0–1 (a.e.t.)		3,957
