= Peter Eustace =

English footballer (born 1944)

Personal information
- Date of birth: 31 July 1944 (age 82)
- Place of birth: Stocksbridge, England
- Height: 5 ft 10 in (1.78 m)
- Position: Midfielder

Youth career
- 1960–1962: Sheffield Wednesday

Senior career*
| Years | Team | Apps | (Gls) |
| 1962–1970 | Sheffield Wednesday | 192 | (21) |
| 1970–1972 | West Ham United | 43 | (6) |
| 1972 | → Rotherham United (loan) | 6 | (1) |
| 1972–1975 | Sheffield Wednesday | 56 | (4) |
| 1975–1976 | Peterborough United | 43 | (5) |
- Worksop Town

Managerial career
- 1988–1989: Sheffield Wednesday
- 1991–1994: Leyton Orient
- * Club domestic league appearances and goals

Peter Eustace (born 31 July 1944) is an English former football player and manager. As a player, he made 340 appearances in the Football League representing Sheffield Wednesday, West Ham United, Rotherham United and Peterborough United. As a manager, he took charge of Sheffield Wednesday and Leyton Orient.

== Career ==
Eustace was born in Stocksbridge, West Riding of Yorkshire, and began his career as a trainee with Sheffield Wednesday. He made his debut in the 1962–63 season, and played more than 200 games in all competitions, before being sold to West Ham United for a club record £90,000 fee. He played in midfield, earlier in his career at wing half, later at inside forward, who both made and scored goals. He also played for Rotherham United, Sheffield Wednesday again, and Peterborough United.

He moved into management in November 1988 at Sheffield Wednesday, being promoted from assistant manager after Howard Wilkinson moved to Leeds United. Eustace was dismissed after just three months and replaced by Ron Atkinson. He returned to football at Leyton Orient, working under Frank Clark, who moved from manager to managing director in 1991. Clark moved to Nottingham Forest in 1993, and Eustace was dismissed a year later when the club failed to reach the play-offs.

Eustace returned to Sheffield Wednesday as a scout during Chris Turner's brief managerial tenure, but was made redundant as part of an overhaul of the coaching staff in 2006. His claim for unfair dismissal was rejected by an industrial tribunal.

He was for a time landlord of The Cheshire Cheese Inn pub in Hope, Derbyshire.

== Honours ==
Sheffield Wednesday

- FA Cup runner-up: 1965–66
