= 1990–91 Football League Cup =

League Cup, Rumbelows Cup

Tournament details
- Country: England; Wales
- Teams: 92

Final positions
- Champions: Sheffield Wednesday (1st title)
- Runners-up: Manchester United

Tournament statistics
- Top goal scorer(s): Paul Gascoigne; Mark Hughes; Lee Sharpe; Alan Shearer (6 goals)

The 1990–91 Football League Cup (known as the Rumbelows Cup for sponsorship reasons) was the 31st season of the Football League Cup, a knockout competition for England's top 92 association football clubs.

The competition began on 27 August 1990, and ended with the final on 21 April 1991 at the Old Wembley Stadium. The cup was won by Sheffield Wednesday, who beat Manchester United 1–0 in the final. A single goal from John Sheridan gave Wednesday the title.

The 1990-91 League Cup remains the last time that one of English football's major honours was won by a team outside the top flight, as winners Sheffield Wednesday were in the second division at the time.

== First round ==
=== First leg ===
| Home team | Score | Away team | Date |
|---|---|---|---|
| Birmingham City | 0–1 | Bournemouth | 28 August 1990 |
| Bradford City | 2–0 | Bury | 29 August 1990 |
| Brentford | 2–0 | Hereford United | 28 August 1990 |
| Brighton & Hove Albion | 0–2 | Northampton | 29 August 1990 |
| Bristol Rovers | 1–2 | Torquay United | 29 August 1990 |
| Carlisle United | 1–0 | Scunthorpe United | 28 August 1990 |
| Chesterfield | 1–2 | Hartlepool United | 28 August 1990 |
| Darlington | 0–0 | Blackpool | 28 August 1990 |
| Doncaster Rovers | 2–6 | Rotherham United | 28 August 1990 |
| Exeter City | 1–1 | Notts County | 29 August 1990 |
| Fulham | 1–2 | Peterborough United | 28 August 1990 |
| Gillingham | 1–0 | Shrewsbury Town | 28 August 1990 |
| Grimsby Town | 2–1 | Crewe Alexandra | 28 August 1990 |
| Halifax Town | 2–0 | Lincoln City | 28 August 1990 |
| Huddersfield Town | 0–3 | Bolton Wanderers | 29 August 1990 |
| Maidstone United | 2–2 | Leyton Orient | 29 August 1990 |
| Mansfield Town | 1–1 | Cardiff City | 28 August 1990 |
| Middlesbrough | 1–1 | Tranmere Rovers | 28 August 1990 |
| Preston North End | 2–0 | Chester City | 28 August 1990 |
| Reading | 0–1 | Oxford United | 28 August 1990 |
| Rochdale | 4–0 | Scarborough | 28 August 1990 |
| Southend United | 2–1 | Aldershot | 28 August 1990 |
| Stockport County | 0–2 | Burnley | 27 August 1990 |
| Stoke City | 0–0 | Swansea City | 29 August 1990 |
| Walsall | 4–2 | Cambridge United | 28 August 1990 |
| West Bromwich Albion | 2–2 | Bristol City | 29 August 1990 |
| Wigan Athletic | 0–1 | Barnsley | 28 August 1990 |
| York City | 0–1 | Wrexham | 28 August 1990 |

=== Second leg ===
| Home team | Score | Away team | Date | Agg |
|---|---|---|---|---|
| Aldershot | 2–2 | Southend United | 4 September 1990 | 3–4 |
| Barnsley | 0–1 | Wigan Athletic | 4 September 1990 | 1–1 |
| Blackpool | 1–1 | Darlington | 4 September 1990 | 1–1 |
| Bolton Wanderers | 2–1 | Huddersfield Town | 4 September 1990 | 5–1 |
| Bournemouth | 1–1 | Birmingham City | 4 September 1990 | 2–1 |
| Bristol City | 1–0 | West Bromwich Albion | 5 September 1990 | 3–2 |
| Burnley | 0–1 | Stockport County | 4 September 1990 | 2–1 |
| Bury | 3–2 | Bradford City | 4 September 1990 | 3–4 |
| Cambridge United | 2–1 | Walsall | 4 September 1990 | 4–5 |
| Cardiff City | 3–0 | Mansfield Town | 4 September 1990 | 4–1 |
| Chester City | 5–1 | Preston North End | 4 September 1990 | 5–3 |
| Crewe Alexandra | 1–0 | Grimsby Town | 4 September 1990 | 2–2 |
| Hartlepool United | 2–2 | Chesterfield | 11 September 1990 | 4–3 |
| Hereford United | 1–0 | Brentford | 5 September 1990 | 1–2 |
| Leyton Orient | 4–1 | Maidstone United | 4 September 1990 | 6–3 |
| Lincoln City | 1–0 | Halifax Town | 5 September 1990 | 1–2 |
| Northampton | 1–1 | Brighton & Hove Albion | 4 September 1990 | 3–1 |
| Notts County | 1–0 | Exeter City | 4 September 1990 | 2–1 |
| Oxford United | 2–1 | Reading | 5 September 1990 | 3–1 |
| Peterborough United | 2–0 | Fulham | 4 September 1990 | 4–1 |
| Rotherham United | 2–1 | Doncaster Rovers | 4 September 1990 | 8–3 |
| Scarborough | 3–3 | Rochdale | 5 September 1990 | 3–7 |
| Scunthorpe United | 1–1 | Carlisle United | 4 September 1990 | 1–2 |
| Shrewsbury Town | 2–0 | Gillingham | 4 September 1990 | 2–1 |
| Swansea City | 0–1 | Stoke City | 4 September 1990 | 0–1 |
| Torquay United | 1–1 | Bristol Rovers | 4 September 1990 | 3–2 |
| Tranmere Rovers | 1–2 | Middlesbrough | 3 September 1990 | 2–3 |
| Wrexham | 2–0 | York City | 4 September 1990 | 3–0 |

== Second round ==
=== First leg ===
| Home team | Score | Away team | Date |
|---|---|---|---|
| Aston Villa | 1–0 | Barnsley | 26 September 1990 |
| Bournemouth | 0–0 | Millwall | 25 September 1990 |
| Cardiff City | 1–1 | Portsmouth | 25 September 1990 |
| Carlisle United | 1–1 | Derby County | 25 September 1990 |
| Charlton Athletic | 2–2 | Leyton Orient | 26 September 1990 |
| Chester City | 0–1 | Arsenal | 25 September 1990 |
| Coventry City | 4–2 | Bolton Wanderers | 26 September 1990 |
| Crystal Palace | 8–0 | Southend United | 25 September 1990 |
| Darlington | 3–0 | Swindon Town | 25 September 1990 |
| Halifax Town | 1–3 | Manchester United | 26 September 1990 |
| Hull City | 0–0 | Wolverhampton Wanderers | 25 September 1990 |
| Leicester City | 1–0 | Leeds United | 26 September 1990 |
| Liverpool | 5–1 | Crewe Alexandra | 25 September 1990 |
| Luton Town | 1–1 | Bradford City | 25 September 1990 |
| Middlesbrough | 2–0 | Newcastle United | 25 September 1990 |
| Northampton | 0–1 | Sheffield United | 25 September 1990 |
| Norwich City | 2–0 | Watford | 26 September 1990 |
| Nottingham Forest | 4–1 | Burnley | 26 September 1990 |
| Notts County | 1–0 | Oldham Athletic | 25 September 1990 |
| Plymouth Argyle | 1–0 | Wimbledon | 25 September 1990 |
| Port Vale | 0–2 | Oxford United | 24 September 1990 |
| Queens Park Rangers | 3–1 | Peterborough United | 26 September 1990 |
| Rochdale | 0–5 | Southampton | 25 September 1990 |
| Rotherham United | 1–1 | Blackburn Rovers | 25 September 1990 |
| Sheffield Wednesday | 2–1 | Brentford | 26 September 1990 |
| Shrewsbury Town | 1–1 | Ipswich Town | 25 September 1990 |
| Sunderland | 0–1 | Bristol City | 25 September 1990 |
| Torquay United | 0–4 | Manchester City | 26 September 1990 |
| Tottenham Hotspur | 5–0 | Hartlepool United | 26 September 1990 |
| Walsall | 0–5 | Chelsea | 26 September 1990 |
| West Ham United | 3–0 | Stoke City | 26 September 1990 |
| Wrexham | 0–5 | Everton | 25 September 1990 |

=== Second leg ===
| Home team | Score | Away team | Date | Agg |
|---|---|---|---|---|
| Arsenal | 5–0 | Chester City | 9 October 1990 | 6–0 |
| Barnsley | 0–1 | Aston Villa | 9 October 1990 | 0–2 |
| Blackburn Rovers | 1–0 | Rotherham United | 9 October 1990 | 2–1 |
| Bolton Wanderers | 2–3 | Coventry City | 9 October 1990 | 4–7 |
| Bradford City | 1–1 | Luton Town | 10 October 1990 | 2–2 |
| Brentford | 1–2 | Sheffield Wednesday | 9 October 1990 | 2–4 |
| Bristol City | 1–6 | Sunderland | 9 October 1990 | 2–6 |
| Burnley | 0–1 | Nottingham Forest | 10 October 1990 | 1–5 |
| Chelsea | 4–1 | Walsall | 10 October 1990 | 9–1 |
| Crewe Alexandra | 1–4 | Liverpool | 9 October 1990 | 2–9 |
| Derby County | 1–0 | Carlisle United | 10 October 1990 | 2–1 |
| Everton | 6–0 | Wrexham | 9 October 1990 | 11–0 |
| Hartlepool United | 1–2 | Tottenham Hotspur | 9 October 1990 | 1–7 |
| Ipswich Town | 3–0 | Shrewsbury Town | 9 October 1990 | 4–1 |
| Leeds United | 3–0 | Leicester City | 10 October 1990 | 3–1 |
| Leyton Orient | 1–0 | Charlton Athletic | 9 October 1990 | 3–2 |
| Manchester City | 0–0 | Torquay United | 10 October 1990 | 4–0 |
| Manchester United | 2–1 | Halifax Town | 10 October 1990 | 5–2 |
| Millwall | 2–1 | Bournemouth | 10 October 1990 | 2–1 |
| Newcastle United | 1–0 | Middlesbrough | 10 October 1990 | 1–2 |
| Oldham Athletic | 5–2 | Notts County | 10 October 1990 | 5–3 |
| Oxford United | 0–0 | Port Vale | 10 October 1990 | 2–0 |
| Peterborough United | 1–1 | Queens Park Rangers | 9 October 1990 | 2–4 |
| Portsmouth | 3–1 | Cardiff City | 9 October 1990 | 4–2 |
| Sheffield United | 2–1 | Northampton | 10 October 1990 | 3–1 |
| Southampton | 3–0 | Rochdale | 9 October 1990 | 8–0 |
| Southend United | 1–2 | Crystal Palace | 9 October 1990 | 1–10 |
| Stoke City | 1–2 | West Ham United | 10 October 1990 | 1–5 |
| Swindon Town | 4–0 | Darlington | 9 October 1990 | 4–3 |
| Watford | 0–3 | Norwich City | 9 October 1990 | 0–5 |
| Wimbledon | 0–2 | Plymouth Argyle | 10 October 1990 | 0–3 |
| Wolverhampton Wanderers | 1–1 | Hull City | 9 October 1990 | 1–1 |

== Third round ==
=== Ties ===
| Home team | Score | Away team | Date |
|---|---|---|---|
| Aston Villa | 2–0 | Millwall | 31 October 1990 |
| Chelsea | 0–0 | Portsmouth | 31 October 1990 |
| Coventry City | 3–0 | Hull City | 31 October 1990 |
| Crystal Palace | 0–0 | Leyton Orient | 30 October 1990 |
| Derby County | 6–0 | Sunderland | 31 October 1990 |
| Ipswich Town | 0–2 | Southampton | 30 October 1990 |
| Leeds United | 2–0 | Oldham Athletic | 31 October 1990 |
| Manchester City | 1–2 | Arsenal | 30 October 1990 |
| Manchester United | 3–1 | Liverpool | 31 October 1990 |
| Middlesbrough | 2–0 | Norwich City | 30 October 1990 |
| Oxford United | 2–1 | West Ham United | 31 October 1990 |
| Plymouth Argyle | 1–2 | Nottingham Forest | 31 October 1990 |
| Queens Park Rangers | 2–1 | Blackburn Rovers | 31 October 1990 |
| Sheffield United | 2–1 | Everton | 30 October 1990 |
| Sheffield Wednesday | 0–0 | Swindon Town | 31 October 1990 |
| Tottenham Hotspur | 2–1 | Bradford City | 30 October 1990 |

=== Replays ===
| Home team | Score | Away team | Date |
|---|---|---|---|
| Leyton Orient | 0–1 | Crystal Palace | 7 November 1990 |
| Portsmouth | 2–3 | Chelsea | 6 November 1990 |
| Swindon Town | 0–1 | Sheffield Wednesday | 6 November 1990 |

== Fourth round ==
=== Ties ===
| Home team | Score | Away team | Date |
|---|---|---|---|
| Arsenal | 2–6 | Manchester United | 28 November 1990 |
| Aston Villa | 3–2 | Middlesbrough | 28 November 1990 |
| Coventry City | 5–4 | Nottingham Forest | 28 November 1990 |
| Oxford United | 1–2 | Chelsea | 28 November 1990 |
| Queens Park Rangers | 0–3 | Leeds United | 27 November 1990 |
| Sheffield United | 0–2 | Tottenham Hotspur | 27 November 1990 |
| Sheffield Wednesday | 1–1 | Derby County | 28 November 1990 |
| Southampton | 2–0 | Crystal Palace | 27 November 1990 |

=== Replay ===
| Home team | Score | Away team | Date |
|---|---|---|---|
| Derby County | 1–2 | Sheffield Wednesday | 12 December 1990 |

== Fifth round ==
=== Ties ===
| Home team | Score | Away team | Date |
|---|---|---|---|
| Chelsea | 0–0 | Tottenham Hotspur | 16 January 1991 |
| Coventry City | 0–1 | Sheffield Wednesday | 23 January 1991 |
| Leeds United | 4–1 | Aston Villa | 16 January 1991 |
| Southampton | 1–1 | Manchester United | 16 January 1991 |

=== Replays ===
| Home team | Score | Away team | Date |
|---|---|---|---|
| Manchester United | 3–2 | Southampton | 23 January 1991 |
| Tottenham Hotspur | 0–3 | Chelsea | 23 January 1991 |

== Semi-finals ==
Sheffield Wednesday moved closer to their first major trophy in more than 50 years with a comfortably victory over Chelsea, while Manchester United edged out Leeds United to book their place at Wembley for a clash against a side managed by their former boss Ron Atkinson.

=== First leg ===
10 February 1991

| Manchester United | 2–1 | Leeds United |
|---|---|---|
| Sharpe 67'; McClair 79' | | Whyte 70' |

Old Trafford, Manchester
Referee: John Martin (Alton, Hampshire)
24 February 1991

| Chelsea | 0–2 | Sheffield Wednesday |
|---|---|---|
| | | Shirtliff 52'; Hirst 80' |

Stamford Bridge, London
Referee: Ron Groves (Weston-Super-Mare)

=== Second leg ===
24 February 1991

| Leeds United | 0–1 | Manchester United |
|---|---|---|
| | | Sharpe 90' |

Elland Road, Leeds
Referee: Vic Callow (Solihull)

Manchester United won 3–1 on aggregate.

27 February 1991

| Sheffield Wednesday | 3–1 | Chelsea |
|---|---|---|
| Pearson 34'; D. Wilson 42'; Williams 88' | | Stuart 62' |

Hillsborough, Sheffield
Referee: Roger Milford (Bristol)

Sheffield Wednesday won 5–1 on aggregate.

== Final ==
21 April 1991
15:00

| Manchester United | 0–1 | Sheffield Wednesday |
|---|---|---|
| | | Sheridan 38' |

Wembley Stadium, London
Attendance: 77,612
Referee: Ray Lewis (Surrey)
