= Carlton Palmer =

English footballer (born 1965)

Personal information
- Full name: Carlton Lloyd Palmer
- Date of birth: 5 December 1965 (age 60)
- Place of birth: Rowley Regis, England
- Height: 6 ft 2 in (1.88 m)
- Position: Midfielder

Youth career
- Chelsea
- West Bromwich Albion

Senior career*
Years	Team	Apps	(Gls)
1984–1989	West Bromwich Albion	121	(4)
1989–1994	Sheffield Wednesday	205	(14)
1994–1997	Leeds United	103	(5)
1997–1999	Southampton	45	(3)
1999	Nottingham Forest	16	(1)
1999–2001	Coventry City	30	(1)
2000–2001	→ Watford (loan)	5	(0)
2001	→ Sheffield Wednesday (loan)	22	(0)
2001–2003	Stockport County	43	(4)
2004	Dublin City	3	(0)
2005	Mansfield Town	1	(0)
2013	Staveley Miners Welfare	1	(0)
2021	Grantham Town	0	(0)
Total		594	(32)

International career
1989	England U21	4	(1)
1989	England B	5	(0)
1992–1993	England	18	(1)

Managerial career
- 2001–2003: Stockport County (player-manager)
- 2004–2005: Mansfield Town
- 2021: Grantham Town
- * Club domestic league appearances and goals

Carlton Lloyd Palmer (born 5 December 1965) is an English football manager, former footballer and football television pundit whose last management role was as manager of Grantham Town.

As a player, he was a midfielder from 1984 to 2005, playing in the Premier League for Sheffield Wednesday, Leeds United, Southampton, Nottingham Forest and Coventry City. He also played for West Bromwich Albion, Watford and Dublin City. He was capped 18 times by England and was part of the squad at UEFA Euro 1992.

He went into management in 2001 when he was appointed player-manager of Stockport County, later holding the same position at Mansfield Town from 2004 to 2005. In 2021 he had a brief return to management with a spell at non-league Grantham Town.

== Club career ==
Palmer started his career at West Bromwich Albion, joining as an apprentice in July 1983 before turning professional in December 1984. He made his league debut in September 1985, as a substitute against Newcastle United. He earned a move to Sheffield Wednesday in February 1989 for £750,000, where he made his name in the old First Division. He missed Wednesday's victory in the 1991 Football League Cup Final due to suspension.

He was bought by Leeds United under manager Howard Wilkinson for £2.6 million in June 1994.

In September 1997 he was signed by Southampton manager Dave Jones for a fee of £1.0 million. In the dressing room he was "abrasive, awkward and argumentative" but on the pitch he was "determined, hard-working and persistent" and his long legs made him "a most difficult player to compete against". Jones said of Palmer "He covers every blade of grass out there, but that's only because his first touch is so crap". In January 1999 he was transferred to Nottingham Forest for a fee of £1.1 million and was replaced in Southampton's midfield by Chris Marsden.

He scored once for Nottingham Forest, his strike coming in a 2–1 win over Grimsby Town. He later played for Coventry City, scoring his first and what turned out to be only goal for the club in a 4–1 win over Newcastle United. Coventry loaned him out to Watford for three months in 2000–01. He also had a loan spell at Sheffield Wednesday, before joining Stockport County in November 2001 as player-manager. Palmer also briefly played for Dublin City in Ireland, whom he joined in August 2004 and played three games before leaving the club.

== International career ==
Graham Taylor gave Palmer all of his 18 caps for the England national team. Palmer scored his only goal for England against San Marino. He was a member of the England squad that went to the 1992 European Championships in Sweden. He was also capped 5 times for the England B team.

== Managerial career ==
Palmer's management career began when he was appointed player-manager of Stockport County in November 2001. He was dismissed by the club in September 2003, following a poor start to the season.

In November 2004, events involving Mansfield Town manager Keith Curle resulted in Curle being suspended. With no manager, the Mansfield chairman contacted Palmer and asked him if he would join The Stags temporarily as manager of the club, which Palmer accepted, without being paid. Curle was later dismissed and Palmer signed a contract until 2006 as manager of Mansfield Town. In September 2005, after Mansfield Town were defeated 2–0 by Rochdale and close to the League Two relegation zone, Palmer resigned as manager stating: "I have had a good career and I don't need to take the abuse from the crowd. Keith Haslam, the Mansfield chairman, is a good mate of mine and I want to keep it that way so I will be stepping down as manager". In April 2021 he was appointed manager of Grantham Town.

On 14 September at the age of 55, Palmer named himself as a substitute in a game against Ashton United due to injuries.

On 9 November 2021, Palmer resigned as manager of Grantham Town. He had joined Grantham to work alongside chairman Darren Ashton, and left as Ashton had resigned from his role.

== Personal life ==
Born in England, Palmer is of Jamaican descent. In August 1997, Palmer was found guilty of sexual assault after groping a teenage girl. The girl at a Leeds court said he made obscene comments about the size of his penis before assaulting her. He was fined £600.

In May 2001, Palmer was convicted of drink-driving. He crashed his Range Rover into two taxis and absconded from the scene of the accident. He was sentenced to 200 hours community service and a two-year driving ban.

Palmer owned an online estate agency in Sheffield called "The Home Game" which ceased trading in August 2008. In June 2010 Palmer appeared in a one-off football special of Come Dine with Me where he came in first place and won £1,000 for charity.

After working in Dubai for Repton School, he set up his own Football Academy in 2012 teaching football and P.E. In August 2014, Palmer became the Director of Sport at Wellington College, Shanghai.

In December 2016, Palmer required a life-saving five-hour operation for a heart condition. He made a full recovery.

In March 2023, Palmer was admitted to hospital after suffering a suspected "small heart attack" while he was running the Sheffield half-marathon.

== Honours ==
Sheffield Wednesday

- FA Cup runner-up: 1992–93
- Football League Cup runner-up: 1992–93

Leeds United

- Football League Cup runner-up: 1995–96

Individual

- PFA Team of the Year: 1990–91 Second Division
