= John Sheridan (footballer) =

Republic of Ireland international footballer and manager

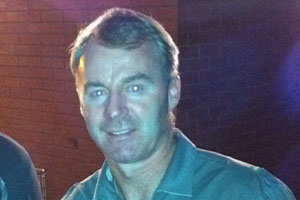
- Sheridan pictured in 2010

Personal information
- Full name: John Joseph Sheridan
- Date of birth: 1 October 1964 (age 62)
- Place of birth: Stretford, England
- Height: 5 ft 9 in (1.75 m)
- Position: Midfielder

Senior career*
Years	Team	Apps	(Gls)
1981–1982	Manchester City	0	(0)
1982–1989	Leeds United	230	(47)
1989	Nottingham Forest	0	(0)
1989–1996	Sheffield Wednesday	199	(25)
1996	→ Birmingham City (loan)	2	(0)
1996	→ Bolton Wanderers (loan)	6	(3)
1996–1998	Bolton Wanderers	33	(0)
1998	Doncaster Rovers	7	(0)
1998–2004	Oldham Athletic	144	(14)
Total		621	(89)

International career
1985–1987	Republic of Ireland U21	2	(0)
1988–1995	Republic of Ireland	34	(5)
1994	Republic of Ireland B	1	(0)

Managerial career
- 2001: Oldham Athletic (caretaker)
- 2003–2004: Oldham Athletic (caretaker)
- 2006–2009: Oldham Athletic
- 2009–2012: Chesterfield
- 2013–2015: Plymouth Argyle
- 2015–2016: Newport County
- 2016: Oldham Athletic
- 2016–2017: Notts County
- 2017: Oldham Athletic
- 2018: Fleetwood Town
- 2018–2019: Carlisle United
- 2019–2020: Chesterfield
- 2020: Waterford
- 2020: Wigan Athletic
- 2020–2021: Swindon Town
- 2022: Oldham Athletic
- * Club domestic league appearances and goals

John Joseph Sheridan (born 1 October 1964) is an English-born former football player and manager who played for the Republic of Ireland national team.

A midfielder, he began his playing career with Manchester City and then moved to Leeds United, where he scored 47 league goals in 230 appearances. He played for Nottingham Forest briefly, under the management of Brian Clough, and then joined Sheffield Wednesday, for whom he scored the winning goal in the 1991 Football League Cup Final at Wembley Stadium. Near the end of his time with the club, he played for Birmingham City and Bolton Wanderers on loan before joining the latter permanently. Sheridan made 199 league appearances for Wednesday and scored 25 goals. He won the First Division title with Bolton in 1997. Sheridan then played for Doncaster Rovers after leaving Bolton and then joined Oldham Athletic, where he spent the last six years of his playing career, scoring 14 league goals in 144 appearances.

He gained 34 caps for the Republic of Ireland and scored five goals over a seven-year period. Having been included in the squad for UEFA Euro 1988, Sheridan went on to play one game at the 1990 FIFA World Cup and four in the 1994 tournament.

He became Oldham's manager in 2006, having served as caretaker twice during his time as a player at the club. He left in 2009, having spent more than ten years at Oldham as a player, coach and manager. Later that year he joined Chesterfield, with whom he won League Two in 2009–10 and the following season's Football League Trophy. Sheridan's next role was as Plymouth Argyle manager from 2013 to 2015, and he then had a succession of short-lived managerial positions, including spells at Newport County, Oldham (three more times), Notts County, Fleetwood Town, Carlisle United, Chesterfield (again), Waterford, Wigan Athletic and Swindon Town.

== Playing career ==
=== Club career ===
Born in Stretford, Lancashire, in 1964, Sheridan joined Manchester City in 1981, but never played for the first team, before moving to Leeds United in July 1982. He made his debut for Leeds in the Football League Second Division on 20 November 1982 in a goalless home draw with Middlesbrough. He appeared 27 times in the league that season, scoring twice. He was rarely out of the side at Elland Road, and was a popular player with the fans.

In the 1986–87 season Leeds reached the semi-finals of the FA Cup and finished fourth in the Second Division—their highest finish since relegation from the First Division in 1982. He scored 15 goals in the league, but Leeds were defeated in the FA Cup semi-finals by eventual winners Coventry City and lost the Second Division promotion/First Division relegation playoff final to Charlton Athletic, and therefore stayed in the Second Division.

However, he remained loyal to the club until 3 August 1989, when after seven years in the Leeds first team (during which he played 230 league games and scored 47 goals) he fell out with manager Howard Wilkinson (who succeeded Billy Bremner the previous autumn) and joined First Division club Nottingham Forest for £650,000.

Sheridan made only one appearance for Forest (in a League Cup tie against Huddersfield) before joining Sheffield Wednesday on 3 November 1989. He scored in a 1–0 victory for Wednesday against Manchester United in the 1991 Football League Cup Final. This was the Yorkshire club's first major trophy for 56 years. He scored 33 goals in 243 appearances for the club.

He also helped Sheffield Wednesday win promotion that season, while they were managed by Ron Atkinson. Atkinson then departed to Aston Villa in June 1991 and veteran player Trevor Francis took over as manager. Sheridan remained a key part of the team under Francis, helping them finish third in the league in 1992, reach both domestic cup finals in 1993 (where they were defeated 2–1 by Arsenal in both finals) and also reached the League Cup semi-finals in the 1993–94 season.

However, Francis was dismissed at the end of the 1994–95 season and new manager David Pleat selected Sheridan less often than Atkinson and Francis had. Sheridan played just 17 times in the 1995–96 campaign, and made his final two appearances for Sheffield Wednesday early in the 1996–97 season.

Sheridan himself says that he supported Manchester City despite growing up in Stretford, close to Manchester United.

He was loaned to Birmingham City for a four-match spell in the autumn of 1996 (where he once again played under Trevor Francis) before finally exiting Hillsborough on 13 November 1996 in a £180,000 move to Division One leaders Bolton Wanderers.

He played 20 times for Bolton in the 1996–97 season and scored twice as they were promoted to the FA Premier League as Division One champions with 100 goals and 98 points. He played 12 times in the 1997–98 season, as his side were relegated on the last day of the season.

He then made a surprise move to Doncaster Rovers, who had just been relegated from the Football League to the Football Conference. He made eight appearances in the 1998–99 before making a Football League comeback with Division Two side Oldham Athletic, where he would remain for the rest of his playing career. Over six seasons in Division Two, he played 114 games and scored 14 league goals as Latics managed to avoid falling into Division Three but never quite made it to Division One, the closest they came being a playoff semi-final defeat in the 2002–03 season. Sheridan finally retired at the end of the 2003–04 season, a few months short of his 40th birthday.

=== International career ===
Sheridan played for the Republic of Ireland national under-19 football team that qualified for the 1982 UEFA European Under-18 Football Championship. In the finals he scored against Austria.

In the 1983 UEFA European Under-18 Football Championship he scored the winner against Belgium.

Sheridan also won 34 caps for the Republic of Ireland, scoring five times. He also scored the 100th Irish international goal at Lansdowne Road in 1994 against Bolivia.

Sheridan was part of the squad that travelled to UEFA Euro 1988 but did not feature in any of Ireland's three games. Sheridan was also part of Ireland's squads for the 1990 FIFA World Cup and the 1994 FIFA World Cup. He played one game as a substitute in 1990, but started in all four matches in 1994 including a 1–0 win in Ireland's opening game against Italy following a goal from Ray Houghton.

In qualifying Sheridan scored one goal against Spain, but as a result of goal difference this was actually an important goal despite Ireland losing 3–1. Had Ireland lost 3–0 they would not have qualified.

== Managerial career ==
=== Oldham Athletic ===
Following the departure of Iain Dowie to Crystal Palace in late 2003, Sheridan took over the coaching of the Oldham first team, along with fellow-veteran David Eyres, before they were both replaced by Brian Talbot. On 1 June 2006, Talbot's successor, Ronnie Moore, was himself dismissed and Sheridan was appointed as manager on a permanent basis.

On 7 December 2006, Sheridan was named Football League One Manager of the Month. He guided Oldham to sixth place in League One in 2006–07, and their promotion challenge was ended in the play-off semi-finals by eventual winners Blackpool.

They finished eighth the following season, but made a more convincing bid for promotion during the 2008–09 season. On 9 March 2009, reports surfaced of a fight involving players and Sheridan at a racetrack, which Sheridan described as being "overblown". Sheridan remained with the club for the next game, a 6–2 defeat at Milton Keynes Dons. The following day, Sheridan agreed to leave the club after a discussion with Oldham managing director Simon Corney. He was immediately replaced with former Oldham manager Joe Royle. Sheridan later said that a series of poor results had led to his departure from Oldham.

=== Chesterfield ===
On 9 June 2009, Sheridan was named as manager of Chesterfield in League Two. Signing a three-year contract with the club, he brought assistant Tommy Wright and goalkeeper Mark Crossley along with him.

Sheridan's second season with the club saw him bringing in his own players, and on 22 April 2011 a draw between Torquay United and Wycombe Wanderers meant Chesterfield were promoted without even kicking a ball in League Two. On 7 May 2011, Chesterfield were confirmed as champions of League Two after a 3–1 victory over play-off contenders Gillingham in their last match of the season. Sheridan's side won the Football League Trophy the following season but the club's league campaign ended in relegation back to League Two.

On 28 August 2012, it was announced that Sheridan had been relieved of his duties after the team gained two points from the opening three league games of the 2012–13 season. After five weeks on gardening leave, a club statement on 3 October announced that Sheridan had resigned with effect from 18 September 2012.

=== Plymouth Argyle ===
Sheridan was appointed manager of Plymouth Argyle on 6 January 2013. "There have been one or two other jobs while I've been out of work that I didn't go for. But as soon as Plymouth came up, a lot of people told me how good it is," said Sheridan, who signed a contract until the end of the 2012–13 season. "I have been in Yorkshire for the majority of my career and it's a change for me. It's a big upheaval for me to come to Plymouth, but I'm really excited." He was named Football League Two Manager of the Month for March after Argyle won four and drew one of their six matches. By the end of the season, the club had won eight and drawn four of Sheridan's 19 games in charge and avoided relegation from the Football League. Sheridan signed a new three-year contract with the club in May. "Obviously, now the hard work starts. I keep saying it – I'm ready to get this club pushed up the league and that's what I am going to try to do," he said.

Sheridan improved the fortunes of Plymouth Argyle in 2013–14, leading the club to a 10th-placed finish in League Two, the first time the club has finished higher than 21st in league competition since 2007–08. However, the season ended on a negative note, as following a 2–1 victory over Sheridan's former club Chesterfield which put the Pilgrims into the play off positions, the team then self capitulated and only won one of the final nine games. This led to Sheridan deciding against renewing the contracts of seven professionals, including former player of the year Maxime Blanchard and Plymouth-born midfielder Luke Young, with promotion the target for 2014–15.

Sheridan's Plymouth finished in seventh place in 2014–15, securing a place in the League Two playoffs following a 2–0 win at Shrewsbury Town on the final day of the regular season. However they were defeated by fourth placed Wycombe Wanderers over the two-legged semi final, with the Pilgrims succumbing to a 5–3 defeat on aggregate.

On 28 May 2015, Plymouth announced that Sheridan had left the club by mutual consent after expressing a desire to return to the north of England for family reasons.

=== Newport County ===
On 2 October 2015, Sheridan was confirmed as the new manager of Newport County replacing Terry Butcher who had been sacked the previous day. Sheridan took over the role with Newport bottom of League Two, having gained five points from the first ten matches of the 2015–16 season. Sheridan managed to secure only one point from his first three games, but then took the side on a ten-game unbeaten run and led the side to an FA Cup 3rd round appearance against EFL Championship club Blackburn Rovers in January 2016. He would finish the season with a record of five wins, seven draws, and five defeats, producing 20 of a possible 51 points.

He left the club in January 2016 to join Oldham for a fourth spell. His departure nearly led to a complaint by Newport County, who were unhappy at images which emerged on social media of Sheridan allegedly meeting with Oldham staff prior to Newport being approached. Club director Gavin Foxall wished Sheridan "all the best" but said that "the manner of his departure has not been right". Oldham officially maintained that they had contacted Newport prior to the meeting.

=== Return to Oldham Athletic ===
On 13 January 2016, Sheridan was confirmed to be returning to Oldham Athletic for a second spell as full-time manager having resigned from his position as Newport County manager after just four months. He managed to save Oldham from relegation to League Two.

=== Notts County ===
On 27 May 2016, Sheridan was appointed as manager of Notts County on a three-year contract.

On 2 January 2017, equalling a club record of nine successive defeats, Sheridan was sacked for gross misconduct as manager shortly after losing 4–0 to Cambridge United. Sheridan left the club with them just one point above the relegation zone with just 22 points from 24 games.

=== Third spell at Oldham Athletic ===
On 12 January 2017, Sheridan became manager of Oldham Athletic for a third time, he replaced Steve Robinson at the League One club. On 25 September 2017 he left Oldham by mutual consent.

=== Fleetwood Town ===
On 22 February 2018, Sheridan was appointed manager of League One club Fleetwood Town until the end of the 2017–18 season, replacing Uwe Rosler. He joined with the club 20th in the league having lost their last eight games in all competitions, but successfully guided them to safety finishing in 14th place.

=== Carlisle United ===
In June 2018, Sheridan was appointed manager of Carlisle United replacing Keith Curle. He resigned on 4 January 2019.

=== Second spell at Chesterfield ===
On 9 January 2019, Sheridan was reappointed as manager of National League club Chesterfield, returning to the club he left in August 2012. He joined with Chesterfield 22nd in the fifth tier having won just one of their last twenty-five league games. On 2 January 2020, following a 3–0 defeat at Solihull Moors that left Chesterfield in 22nd place with only 17 games of the season left, Sheridan's contract was terminated.

=== Waterford ===
In July 2020 Sheridan was named manager of League of Ireland Premier Division club Waterford. He left the role after just eight games in charge of the team to return to England.

=== Wigan Athletic ===
Sheridan was appointed manager of League One club Wigan Athletic by the administrators on 11 September 2020. He only lasted fifteen games in charge before making another move.

=== Swindon Town ===
On 11 November 2020, Sheridan was approached by Swindon Town to become their next manager following the departure of Richie Wellens. On 13 November 2020, he signed a contract with the Wiltshire club until the end of the season, but left on 17 April 2021.

=== Fourth spell at Oldham Athletic ===
On 22 January 2022, Sheridan returned to Oldham Athletic as head coach with the club bottom of the Football League. He could not halt the slide towards the National League. Oldham were relegated from the English Football League following a 2–1 home defeat by Salford City on 23 April 2022, a match interrupted by an on-pitch protest by fans against the club's owners. Sheridan said he would stay at Oldham with the aim of an immediate return to the English Football League in the next season. On 15 September 2022 it was announced that he would step aside after their match on 17 September.

== Career statistics ==
=== Playing statistics ===
Club	Years	League		FA Cup		League Cup		Total	
Club	Years	Apps	Goals	Apps	Goals	Apps	Goals	Apps	Goals
Manchester City	1981–1982	0	0	0	0	0	0	0	0
Leeds United	1982–1989	230	47	18	3	24	3	272	53
Nottingham Forest	1989	0	0	0	0	1	0	1	0
Sheffield Wednesday	1989–1996	199	25	20	3	24	3	243	31
Birmingham City	1996	2	0	0	0	2	0	4	0
Bolton Wanderers	1996	6	3	0	0	1	0	7	3
Bolton Wanderers	1996–1998	33	0	2	0	1	0	36	0
Doncaster Rovers	1998	7	0	0	0	0	0	7	0
Oldham Athletic	1998–2004	144	14	15	2	4	0	163	16
Total		621	89	55	8	57	6	733	103

=== Managerial statistics ===
As of match played on 13 September 2022

Managerial record by team and tenure
Team	From	To	Record				
Team	From	To	G	W	D	L	Win %
Oldham Athletic (co-caretaker)	31 October 2001	7 November 2001	1	0	1	0	0.00
Oldham Athletic (caretaker)	20 December 2003	10 March 2004	13	3	6	4	23.08
Oldham Athletic	1 June 2006	15 March 2009	151	61	43	47	40.40
Chesterfield	9 June 2009	28 August 2012	160	63	38	59	39.38
Plymouth Argyle	6 January 2013	28 May 2015	126	48	31	47	38.10
Newport County	2 October 2015	13 January 2016	17	5	7	5	29.41
Oldham Athletic	13 January 2016	27 May 2016	22	9	6	7	40.91
Notts County	27 May 2016	2 January 2017	32	8	6	18	25.00
Oldham Athletic	12 January 2017	25 September 2017	33	10	9	14	30.30
Fleetwood Town	22 February 2018	1 June 2018	13	6	3	4	46.15
Carlisle United	5 June 2018	4 January 2019	32	15	4	13	46.88
Chesterfield	9 January 2019	2 January 2020	52	17	13	22	32.69
Waterford	8 July 2020	11 September 2020	8	3	2	3	37.50
Wigan Athletic	11 September 2020	13 November 2020	15	3	2	10	20.00
Swindon Town	13 November 2020	18 April 2021	33	8	4	21	24.24
Oldham Athletic	22 January 2022	17 September 2022	30	8	7	15	26.67
Total			738	267	182	289	36.18

== Honours ==
=== As a player ===
Sheffield Wednesday

- Football League Cup: 1990–91; runner-up: 1992–93
- FA Cup runner-up: 1992–93

Bolton Wanderers

- Football League First Division: 1996–97

Individual

- PFA Team of the Year: 1986–87 Second Division, 1987–88 Second Division, 1988–89 Second Division, 1990–91 Second Division

=== As a manager ===
Chesterfield

- Football League Two: 2010–11
- Football League Trophy: 2011–12

Individual

- Football League One Manager of the Month: November 2006
- Football League Two Manager of the Month: October 2009, February 2010, March 2013

== See also ==
- List of Republic of Ireland international footballers born outside the Republic of Ireland
