= Nigel Pearson =

English football manager (born 1963)

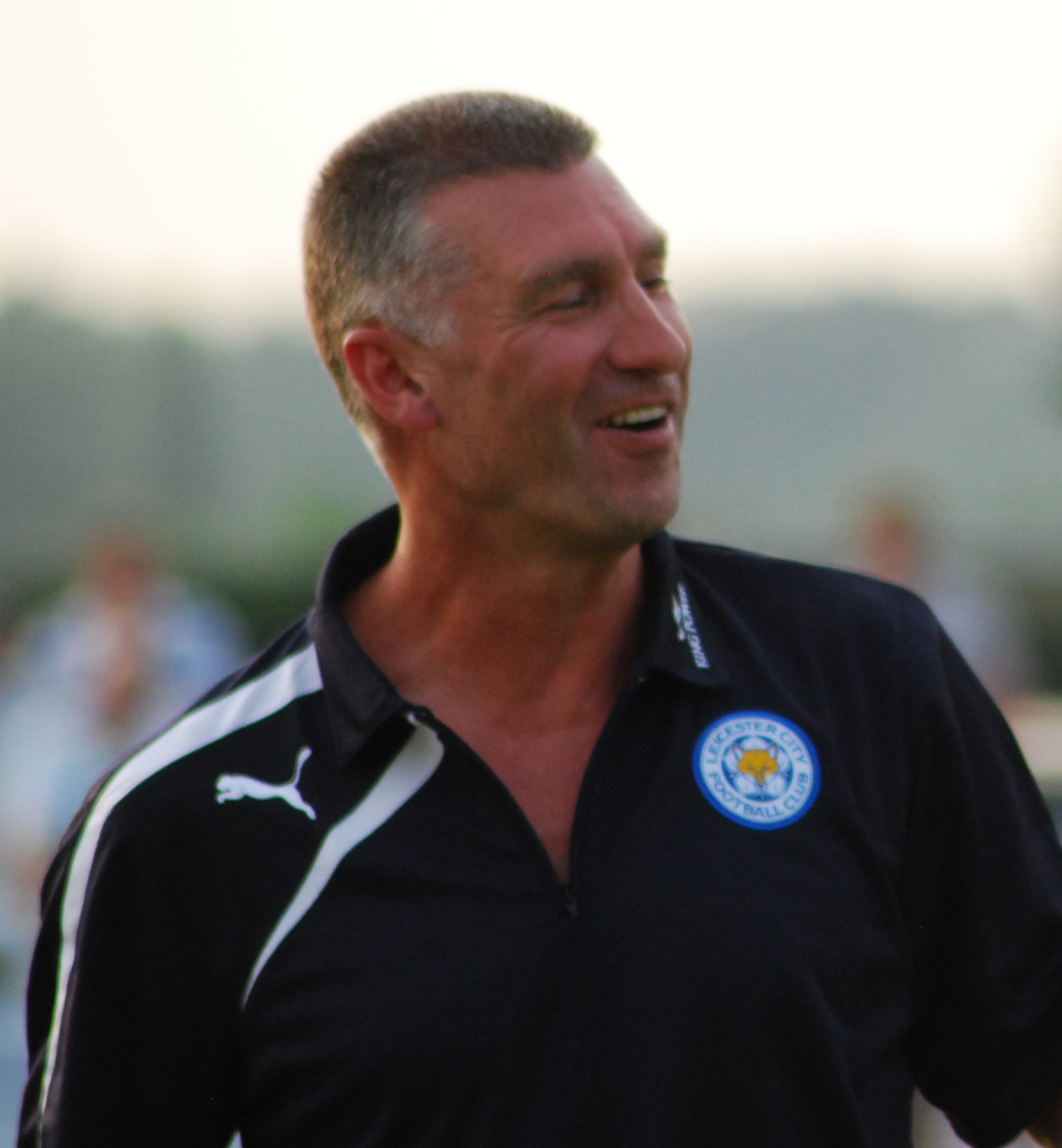
- Pearson at Leicester City training in 2013

Personal information
- Full name: Nigel Graham Pearson
- Date of birth: 21 August 1963 (age 63)
- Place of birth: Nottingham, England
- Height: 6 ft 1 in (1.85 m)
- Position: Defender

Youth career
- 1980–1981: Heanor Town

Senior career*
Years	Team	Apps	(Gls)
1981–1987	Shrewsbury Town	153	(5)
1987–1994	Sheffield Wednesday	180	(14)
1994–1998	Middlesbrough	116	(5)
Total		449	(24)

Managerial career
- 1998–1999: Carlisle United
- 2006: West Bromwich Albion (caretaker)
- 2007: England U21 (caretaker)
- 2007: Newcastle United (caretaker)
- 2008: Newcastle United (caretaker)
- 2008: Southampton
- 2008–2010: Leicester City
- 2010–2011: Hull City
- 2011–2015: Leicester City
- 2016: Derby County
- 2017–2019: OH Leuven
- 2019–2020: Watford
- 2021–2023: Bristol City
- * Club domestic league appearances and goals

Nigel Graham Pearson (born 21 August 1963) is an English football manager and former professional player. He last managed Championship club Bristol City. During his playing career, he was a defender and played for Shrewsbury Town, Sheffield Wednesday and Middlesbrough. As a coach he has taken charge of Hull City, Southampton, Carlisle United, Leicester City, Derby County, OH Leuven, and Watford; and was assistant manager for England Under-21s and Newcastle United.

== Playing career ==
=== Shrewsbury Town ===
Pearson was born in Nottingham, where he attended William Sharp Comprehensive School. He began his playing career with non-league Heanor Town before joining Second Division Shrewsbury Town in November 1981. He made his first-team debut in a 1–0 defeat at Oldham Athletic on the opening day of the 1982–83 season. Pearson's first Football League goal came on 12 March 1983 in a 3–1 win against Barnsley at Gay Meadow. Pearson ended the season with 39 out of a possible 42 starts as Shrewsbury finished in ninth place in the table.

In the following season, Shrewsbury finished one place higher but injuries restricted Pearson to 26 games. Injury prevented him from playing at all in 1984–85, when Shrewsbury again finished eighth in the table, but he returned in 1985–86, making 35 appearances as Shrewsbury dropped to 17th.

In 1986–87 he was an ever-present, making 42 appearances and contributing three goals, as the Shrews finished in 18th place. He started the next season, before being signed by Sheffield Wednesday's manager Howard Wilkinson on 12 October 1987 for a fee of £250,000.

In his six years with Shrewsbury Town, he made a total of 181 appearances in all competitions, scoring five goals.

=== Sheffield Wednesday ===
Pearson moved to Sheffield Wednesday in 1987. He won the League Cup as captain during the 1990–91 season, being selected as "Man of the Match" in the final at Wembley. In the same season he also helped the Owls win promotion to Division One. During the 1992–93 season he helped Sheffield Wednesday reach both domestic cup finals, but broke his leg in the League Cup semi-final and therefore could not play in either final. In total Pearson made more than 200 appearances for the Owls, scoring 14 league goals – including the club's first in the Premier League, in a 1–1 draw with Everton at Goodison Park on the opening day of the 1992–93 season.

=== Middlesbrough ===
Middlesbrough manager Bryan Robson signed Pearson for £750,000 in 1994. Pearson captained the side to promotion twice and to three domestic cup finals. He retired from playing in 1998.

== Managerial career ==
=== Early career ===
As manager of Carlisle United, Pearson helped to keep the club in the Football League at the end of the 1998–99 season. He signed goalkeeper Jimmy Glass on loan. In Pearson's last match in charge of the team, Glass scored an injury-time goal against Plymouth Argyle, saving the club from relegation to the Football Conference at the expense of Scarborough.

In 1999, he was recruited as Stoke City's first-team coach by Gary Megson. Although Megson was sacked later that year by the club's Icelandic consortium, Pearson was kept on for a further two years under Guðjón Þórðarson, before being sacked in 2001.

Pearson moved to West Bromwich Albion in November 2004 as assistant manager to Bryan Robson, and took over as caretaker manager when Robson left the club in September 2006. Albion won three and drew one of his matches in charge, before stepping down from the role in preparation for the arrival of new manager Tony Mowbray.

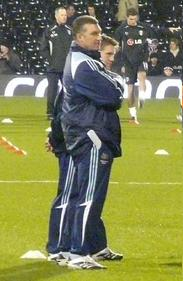
Pearson as assistant manager of Newcastle United in 2006

On 19 October 2006, he was linked with the Sheffield Wednesday manager's position but instead took over as assistant manager of Newcastle United, replacing Kevin Bond, who was dismissed following allegations he was prepared to take bungs for players whilst at Portsmouth.

On 1 February 2007, Pearson was confirmed as assistant coach to Stuart Pearce, the England U21 team manager, until after the 2007 UEFA European Under-21 Championship. As Pearce's contract limited him to involvement in only one friendly before the Championship, Pearson led the under-21s in their 3–3 draw against Italy on 24 March 2007, the first game at the new Wembley Stadium.

When Newcastle manager Glenn Roeder resigned on 6 May 2007, Pearson took charge of the remaining game of the season, away to Watford. Pearson stayed on at Newcastle as a coach following the arrival of Sam Allardyce as manager at the club. On 9 January, following the departure of Allardyce, he was re-appointed as caretaker manager for Newcastle's trip to Manchester United. Newcastle lost 6–0, after a Cristiano Ronaldo hat-trick, a brace from Carlos Tevez and a Rio Ferdinand goal. On 16 January 2008, after Kevin Keegan had been announced as the next permanent manager of the club, Pearson took charge of the team for the 3rd round FA Cup replay against Stoke City, which Newcastle won 4–1. On 8 February, Pearson left the club.

=== Southampton ===
On 18 February 2008, Pearson was appointed as manager of Southampton on a rolling contract. On 19 February 2008, his career at Southampton got off to a poor start, losing 2–0 at home to Plymouth Argyle in front of 17,806, the lowest recorded crowd at St Mary's Stadium. On 22 February 2008, Southampton gained their first point under his managership, drawing 1–1 away to Scunthorpe United.

On 4 May 2008, with only one game to go, at home to Sheffield United, the Saints were in 22nd place and facing relegation to League One. After going 1–0 down, Pearson's side pulled off a comeback to win the game 3–2, with two goals scored by Stern John (who was also sent off) and one by Marek Saganowski. Southampton secured Championship status for another season, at the expense of Leicester City, who could only manage a 0–0 draw with Premier League-bound Stoke City, and were relegated to the third tier of English football for the first time in their 124-year history . On 30 May 2008, Pearson was replaced by Dutch coach Jan Poortvliet after only three months in charge.

=== Leicester City ===
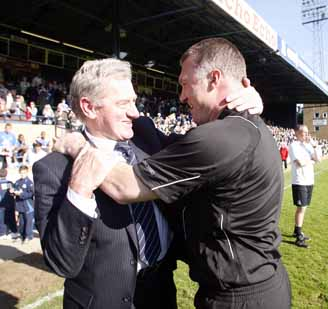
Pearson (right) and Milan Mandarić after winning the League One title in 2009

On 20 June 2008, Pearson was appointed as manager of Leicester City, then in League One. Craig Shakespeare became the club's first team coach and co-assistant manager alongside Steve Walsh (a former Chelsea chief scout, and not the former Leicester City player of the same name). As well as having worked together on the West Bromwich Albion coaching staff, the two had also played together at Sheffield Wednesday. Shakespeare once said that Pearson was the best captain he had ever played under. Pearson was named League One Manager of the Month for August 2008 after Leicester won three of their first four games, scoring nine goals and conceding only once. After the disappointing defeat of losing 3–2 away to Brighton & Hove Albion despite being 2–0 up at half-time, Leicester bounced back with a club-record 23-match unbeaten run in the league between 1 November 2008 and 7 March 2009, before finally being beaten 2–0 by Tranmere Rovers. He was again named the League One Manager of the Month during that run in December 2008. On 18 April 2009, Leicester won 2–0 at Southend United, confirming their promotion back to the Championship as League One champions. The season finished with the club racking up their highest ever points tally of 96 points, as they lost just four of their 46 league games.

Veteran full-back Chris Powell also joined Pearson's coaching staff as a player/coach in the summer of 2009, as Leicester continued their upsurge in form under Pearson the following season in the Championship. Leicester completed a full calendar year of being undefeated at home, before a 2–1 defeat against Preston North End on 26 September 2009 ended the longest unbeaten home run in the country. Leicester spent almost the entire season in the play-off positions and an impressive month of February saw Pearson pick up the Championship Manager of the Month award. Leicester finished in 5th place in their first season back in the Championship, earning a place in the Championship play-offs and a chance of back-to-back promotions. They were defeated by Cardiff City following a penalty shoot-out in the play-off semifinal, despite fighting back from a 2-goal aggregate deficit in the second leg to briefly lead 3–2.

At the end of the season, Pearson took a hard line on Leicester defender Wayne Brown, who had publicly said in front of his teammates – including some of ethnic minority backgrounds – that he had voted for the far-right British National Party in the general election on 6 May. He dropped Brown from the side for the play-offs. During the close season, Brown left the club to sign for Preston North End.

Despite his relative success in his two years at Leicester, he often had a very strained relationship with chairman Milan Mandaric and chief executive Lee Hoos. In the summer of 2010, Mandaric showed a consortium of potential club buyers round the club without Pearson's knowledge and invited Paulo Sousa to the second leg of the play-off semifinal. The club then allowed Hull City to speak to him. Pearson said: "It doesn't take a rocket scientist to work out what's happening" – suggesting the club did not want to keep him. He then left Leicester to take the job at Hull City and Paulo Sousa was later appointed as his successor.

=== Hull City ===
On 29 June 2010, he was appointed Hull City manager. Despite financial difficulties following relegation from the Premier League, Pearson was still able to enter the transfer market, bringing in players such as Nolberto Solano, James Harper, Liam Rosenior, Robert Koren and Jay Simpson. The club won their first away game in over a year at Norwich City in September. Following that victory, Pearson's club broke a 66-year-old record with 14 consecutive away games without defeat. The season ended with an 11th-place finish.

Hull started the 2011–12 season with the club sitting one point outside the play-offs, having a game in hand in the middle of November; however, on 7 November 2011 Pearson requested permission to talk to his former club Leicester.

=== Return to Leicester City ===
After Mandaric and Hoos had departed the club, Pearson was persuaded to rejoin Leicester City under their new ownership by chairman Vichai Raksriaksorn, and after days of negotiations he was finally re-appointed as manager on 15 November 2011 with Leicester sitting 12th in the Championship. Pearson started well, taking seven points from his first three games, which took Leicester into the top six for the first time since he had last been at the club, over 18 months previously, before Leicester faced the Hull City side Pearson had left just 18 days earlier. Leicester lost the game 2–1 thanks to a late Robert Koren strike, as Pearson was greeted with chants of "Judas" from the Hull fans. That result also signalled a downturn in form, beginning a run which saw Leicester fail to win for 5 consecutive games. However, after the new year, Pearson rang the changes for the trip to Crystal Palace in an attempt to get back to winning ways, recalling Aleksander Tunchev to play his first match of the season and bringing in reserve team player Tom Kennedy and 18-year-old youth academy graduate Liam Moore to make his first team debut for the club. His inexperienced team selection paid off as Leicester earnt a 2–1 victory to end their winless run.

Pearson was sent to the stands in a 2–2 draw against his former club Middlesbrough, after the referee had allegedly "barged" into Leicester's dressing room unannounced, to which Pearson reacted angrily. The referee then left it to the fourth official to tell him he had been sent off. Pearson then appealed his sending off, saying, "I was giving my players instructions and there is no chance I will tolerate anyone coming in there who has nothing to do with my team. I'm within my rights to tell him to get out – he was telling me to hurry up. I can't wait to see the fall-out and I can't wait to appeal." Pearson's appeal was successful, and he faced no disciplinary action from the Football Association (FA). After an inconsistent season, Leicester ended the season ninth in the Championship.

Leicester made a slow start to the 2012–13 season, losing three of their first five league games and suffering a surprising defeat in the second round of the League Cup at the hands of League Two side Burton Albion; however, a run of five straight victories saw Leicester sitting top of the table after 12 games and also earnt Pearson a nomination for Championship Manager of the Month in September. However, a drop in form in mid-season saw Leicester fall to fifth. The signing of Chris Wood, though, saw a rejuvenated Leicester go on another run of five consecutive wins, with Leicester reprising 2nd place in the Championship table, behind leaders Cardiff City, and Pearson this time won the Championship Manager of the Month award for January 2013. Again, a drop in form followed Leicester City's rise to second spot, and they only made the Championship play-offs on goal difference following their last gasp 3–2 win against neighbours Nottingham Forest on the last day of the season. After winning the first leg against third-placed Watford 1–0, Pearson's Leicester City narrowly lost the second leg of the play-offs 3–1, after Anthony Knockaert missed a last-minute penalty which would have sent them to Wembley.

The 2013–14 season saw Leicester recover from their play-off defeat of the previous season, starting well and sitting in first place at Christmas. It was during this time that the club started a club-record run of consecutive league victories, winning nine games from 21 December 2013 – 1 February 2014, which saw the club pull 10 points clear at the top of the Championship and earnt Pearson the Championship Manager of the Month award for January 2014. Continuing good results, which saw Leicester play 20 league games unbeaten until the end of March, also earned Pearson the award again in March 2014. Leicester ended the season as champions, winning promotion to the Premier League.

In February 2015, following a home defeat by Crystal Palace in a game in which, at one point, Pearson put his hands around Palace's James McArthur's neck, while on the ground, the press reported that Pearson had been sacked. In a "night of confusion," it was reported by The Guardian that club staff, and even Pearson himself, had been told that he was sacked. However, the same evening, the club issued a statement stating that such claims were "inaccurate and without foundation." Following victories against West Ham United, West Brom, Swansea City and Burnley, with just one defeat, against Chelsea, during the month of April 2015, Pearson won the Premier League Manager of the Month for the first time. On 29 April 2015, following a 3–1 defeat to Chelsea, Pearson was again embroiled in controversy, when he called a journalist an "ostrich", "stupid" and "daft" during a post-match news conference. He apologised for his comments the following day.

On 16 May 2015, Leicester City confirmed their Premier League status following a goalless draw with Sunderland, becoming only the third team to escape relegation having been bottom at Christmas. Leicester finished the season in 14th place.

On 30 June 2015, however, Pearson was sacked, with the club stating that "the working relationship between Nigel and the Board was no longer viable." The sacking was linked to his son James's role in an alleged racist sex tape made by three Leicester City reserve players in Thailand during a post-season tour. He was replaced at Leicester City by Claudio Ranieri, who took Leicester to the Premier League title the following year as 5000–1 outsiders. Sports journalists gave Pearson credit for building the team that won the title, as did player Riyad Mahrez.

=== Derby County ===
After a year out of football, Pearson was appointed manager of Championship team Derby County on a three-year contract on 27 May 2016. On 27 September 2016, Pearson was suspended by the club pending an internal investigation following a row with owner Mel Morris. It was later claimed that the row began with Pearson's objection to Morris's use of drones to observe training sessions. Pearson left the club by mutual consent on 8 October 2016, with Derby 20th in the Championship.

=== OH Leuven ===
After losing out on the managerial role at his former club Middlesbrough to Garry Monk, Pearson was appointed as the manager of Belgian First Division B side Oud-Heverlee Leuven on 22 September 2017. He was sacked on 3 February 2019.

=== Watford ===
Pearson was appointed Watford manager on 6 December 2019 on a contract until the end of the season. He was their third manager of the season after Javi Gracia and Quique Sánchez Flores. On 29 February 2020, with Pearson as manager, Watford defeated league leaders Liverpool 3–0. This was the first time in 45 games that Liverpool had lost in the Premier League.

On 19 July 2020, Pearson was sacked with two games remaining in the 2019–20 season. Watford were seven points adrift at the bottom of the league when Pearson took charge, and three points above the relegation zone when he was sacked. Following Pearson's sacking, Watford went on to lose their remaining two games and were relegated.

=== Bristol City ===
On 22 February 2021, Pearson was appointed manager of Bristol City on a contract until the end of the season. On 29 April 2021, he signed a three-year contract. He left Bristol City on 29 October 2023. At that time he was the second-longest-serving manager in the Championship, and City were 15th in the league, having lost five of their past seven matches – Pearson's final game being a 2–0 defeat by Cardiff City on 28 October.

== Personal life ==
Pearson's grandfather Percy Mills also played football for Notts County. Pearson's mother died on 3 January 2020 at the age of 84, but he took charge of Watford's FA Cup game against Tranmere Rovers the following day.

In March 2020, Pearson fell ill and isolated for ten days under COVID-19 protocols. In June 2020, a blood test confirmed he had previously contracted the disease. While still at Watford he suffered from secondary symptoms, including an irregular heartbeat, high resting pulse and swollen lips that saw him miss a press conference, although he only informed a small number of staff at the club of his condition. In August and September 2020, after his departure from Watford, Pearson endured a bout of rheumatoid arthritis that saw him suffer with swollen joints. He struggled to move during this period, slept heavily and had a shortness of breath. In September 2021, Pearson caught COVID-19 again and self-isolated for ten days.

Outside football, Pearson is a keen outdoorsman and hiker. He once encountered a pack of wild dogs while hiking alone in the Carpathian Mountains. In 2022, he bought three acres of ancient woodland in Somerset, which he now manages. He enjoys oil painting, and has expressed an interesting in participating in the Mongol Rally. Had he not been a professional footballer, Pearson would have considered a career as a navigator in the Royal Air Force.

In October 2023 just before Pearson left his last managerial appointment at Bristol City, it was reported he was suffering from a neurological condition, and had been using the assistance of crutches to walk. In December 2024 he announced that he had to learn to walk again and that his condition was improving.

== Career statistics ==
=== Playing statistics ===
Appearances and goals by club, season and competition
Club	Season	League			FA Cup		League Cup		Other		Total	
Club	Season	Division	Apps	Goals	Apps	Goals	Apps	Goals	Apps	Goals	Apps	Goals
Shrewsbury Town	1982–83	Second Division	39	1	2	0	4	0	3 (Note: Appearances in Football League Group Cup)	0	48	1
Shrewsbury Town	1983–84	Second Division	26	0	3	0	2	0	0	0	31	0
Shrewsbury Town	1984–85	Second Division	0	0	0	0	0	0	0	0	0	0
Shrewsbury Town	1985–86	Second Division	35	1	1	0	3	0	2 (Note: Appearances in Full Members' Cup)	0	40	1
Shrewsbury Town	1986–87	Second Division	42	3	0	0	7	0	1	0	50	3
Shrewsbury Town	1987–88	Second Division	11	0	0	0	3	0	0	0	14	0
Shrewsbury Town	Total		153	5	6	0	19	0	6	0	184	5
Sheffield Wednesday	1987–88	First Division	19	2	4	0	0	0	2	0	25	2
Sheffield Wednesday	1988–89	First Division	37	2	2	0	2	0	1	0	42	2
Sheffield Wednesday	1989–90	First Division	33	1	2	0	1	0	2	0	38	1
Sheffield Wednesday	1990–91	Second Division	39	6	4	1	9	5	1	0	53	11
Sheffield Wednesday	1991–92	First Division	31	2	1	0	2	0	1	0	35	2
Sheffield Wednesday	1992–93	Premier League	16	1	2	0	5	0	3 (Note: Appearances in UEFA Cup)	0	26	1
Sheffield Wednesday	1993–94	Premier League	5	0	0	0	0	0	0	0	5	0
Sheffield Wednesday	Total		180	14	15	1	19	5	10	0	224	20
Middlesbrough	1994–95	First Division	33	3	2	0	0	0	0	0	35	2
Middlesbrough	1995–96	Premier League	36	0	3	0	5	0	0	0	44	0
Middlesbrough	1996–97	Premier League	18	0	3	0	5	0	0	0	26	0
Middlesbrough	1997–98	First Division	29	2	1	0	4	0	0	0	34	2
Middlesbrough	Total		116	5	9	0	14	0	0	0	139	4
Career total			449	24	30	1	52	5	16	0	547	30

=== Managerial statistics ===
As of match played 28 October 2023

Managerial record by team and tenure
Team	From	To	Record					Ref
Team	From	To	P	W	D	L	Win %	Ref
Carlisle United	17 December 1998	17 May 1999	30	5	13	12	16.67	
West Bromwich Albion (caretaker)	18 September 2006	17 October 2006	4	3	1	0	75.00	
England U21 (caretaker)	24 March 2007	24 March 2007	1	0	1	0	0.00	
Newcastle United (caretaker)	6 May 2007	15 May 2007	1	0	1	0	0.00	
Newcastle United (caretaker)	9 January 2008	16 January 2008	2	1	0	1	50.00	
Southampton	18 February 2008	30 May 2008	14	3	7	4	21.43	
Leicester City	20 June 2008	29 June 2010	107	55	30	22	51.40	
Hull City	29 June 2010	15 November 2011	64	23	20	21	35.94	
Leicester City	15 November 2011	30 June 2015	182	85	38	59	46.70	
Derby County	27 May 2016	8 October 2016	14	3	5	6	21.43	
OH Leuven	22 September 2017	3 February 2019	56	18	15	23	32.14	
Watford	6 December 2019	19 July 2020	22	7	5	10	31.82	
Bristol City	24 February 2021	29 October 2023	131	42	32	57	32.06	
Total			627	245	168	214	39.07	

== Honours ==
=== Player ===
Sheffield Wednesday

- Football League Cup: 1990–91
- Football League Second Division promotion: 1990–91

Middlesbrough

- Football League First Division: 1994–95; second-place promotion: 1997–98
- FA Cup runner-up: 1996–97
- Football League Cup runner-up: 1996–97, 1997–98

Individual

- PFA Team of the Year: 1990–91 Second Division, 1997–98 First Division

=== Manager ===
Leicester City

- Football League Championship: 2013–14
- Football League One: 2008–09

Individual

- Football League One Manager of the Month: August 2008, December 2008
- Football League Championship Manager of the Month: February 2010, January 2013, January 2014, March 2014
- LMA Championship Manager of the Year: 2013–14
- Premier League Manager of the Month: April 2015
