= List of Motherwell F.C. seasons =

This is a record of the seasons played by Motherwell Football Club in Scottish and European competition from 1891 to the present day. It details the club's achievements in major competitions, and details all the managers of Motherwell.

This list does not include matches from the Lanarkshire Cup.

== Seasons ==
Season	League	Tier	Manager (Note: All managers are Scottish unless their nationality is stated) (Note: Before 1911, a Committee was in place as a management team)	League									Scottish Cup	League Cup (Note: The League Cup competition did not start until the 1946–47 season.)	Europe (Note: European club competitions did not begin until the 1955–56 season.)		Leading Scorer(s) (Note: All players are Scottish unless their nationality is stated) (Note: Only league goals are stated)
Season	League	Tier	Manager	Pld	W	D	L	GF	GA	GD	Pts	FP (Note: Positions resulting in promotion are in bold)	Scottish Cup	League Cup	Europe		Leading Scorer(s)
1891–92	Football Federation	U	Committee	22	4	6	12	58	80	−22	14	12th	R1	-	-	-	-
1892–93	Football Federation	U (Note: Since it was a Regional League, it is unknown what level the league was in the Scottish Football pyramid.)	Committee	18	11	3	4	77	46	+31	25	2nd	R2	-	-	-	-
1893–94	Division Two	2 (Note: Since the 1893-94 season, Motherwell have never competed in a league lower than the second tier of Scottish Football.)	Committee	18	11	1	6	61	44	+17	23	4th	-	-	-	-	-
1894–95	Division Two	2	Committee	18	10	2	6	56	39	+17	22	2nd	-	-	-	-	-
1895–96	Division Two	2	Committee	18	5	3	10	31	47	−16	13	8th	-	-	-	-	-
1896–97	Division Two	2	Committee	18	6	1	11	40	55	−15	13	9th	-	-	-	-	-
1897–98	Division Two	2	Committee	18	3	4	11	31	56	−25	10	10th	-	-	-	-	-
1898–99	Division Two	2	Committee	18	7	6	5	41	40	+1	20	4th	-	-	-	-	-
1899–1900	Division Two	2	Committee	18	9	1	8	38	36	+2	19	4th	-	-	-	-	-
1900–01	Division Two	2	Committee	18	4	3	11	26	42	−16	11	10th	-	-	-	-	-
1901–02	Division Two	2	Committee	22	12	2	8	50	44	+6	26	3rd	-	-	-	-	-
1902–03	Division Two	2	Committee	22	12	4	6	44	9	+35	28	2nd	R2	-	-	-	-
1903–04	Division One	1	Committee	26	6	3	17	26	61	−35	15	13th	R2	-	-	-	-
1904–05	Division One	1	Committee	26	6	2	18	28	53	−25	14	14th	R2	-	-	-	-
1905–06	Division One	1	Committee	34	9	8	13	50	64	−14	26	10th	-	-	-	-	-
1906–07	Division One	1	Committee	34	12	9	13	45	48	−3	33	10th	-	-	-	-	-
1907–08	Division One	1	Committee	34	12	7	15	61	53	+8	31	10th	R2	-	-	-	-
1908–09	Division One	1	Committee	34	11	6	17	47	73	−26	28	13th	R2	-	-	-	-
1909–10	Division One	1	Committee	34	12	8	14	59	60	−1	32	10th	QF	-	-	-	-
1910–11	Division One	1	Committee	34	8	4	22	37	66	−29	20	17th	QF	-	-	-	-
1911–12	Division One	1	John "Sailor" Hunter	34	11	5	18	34	44	−10	27	14th	QF	-	-	-	-
1912–13	Division One	1	John "Sailor" Hunter	34	12	13	9	47	39	+8	37	6th	R2	-	-	-	-
1913–14	Division One	1	John "Sailor" Hunter	38	11	6	21	46	65	−19	28	17th	QF	-	-	-	-
1914–15	Division One	1	John "Sailor" Hunter	38	10	10	18	49	66	−17	30	18th	(Note: The Scottish Cup was not held in 1915 through to 1918 because of the First World War.)	-	-	-	-
1915–16	Division One	1	John "Sailor" Hunter	38	11	8	19	55	82	−27	30	14th	-	-	-	-	-
1916–17	Division One	1	John "Sailor" Hunter	38	16	6	16	57	59	−2	38	8th	-	-	-	-	-
1917–18	Division One	1	John "Sailor" Hunter	34	16	9	9	70	51	+19	41	5th	-	-	-	-	-
1918–19	Division One	1	John "Sailor" Hunter	34	14	10	10	51	40	+11	38	5th	-	-	-	-	-
1919–20	Division One	1	John "Sailor" Hunter	42	23	11	8	74	53	+21	57	3rd	-	-	-	-	-
1920–21	Division One	1	John "Sailor" Hunter	42	19	10	13	75	51	+24	48	5th	QF	-	-	-	-
1921–22	Division One	1	John "Sailor" Hunter	42	16	7	19	63	58	+5	39	13th	QF	-	-	-	-
1922–23	Division One	1	John "Sailor" Hunter	38	13	10	15	59	60	−1	36	13th	SF	-	-	-	-
1923–24	Division One	1	John "Sailor" Hunter	38	15	7	16	58	63	−5	37	10th	R2	-	-	-	-
1924–25	Division One	1	John "Sailor" Hunter	38	10	10	18	54	63	−9	30	18th	R3	-	-	-	-
1925–26	Division One	1	John "Sailor" Hunter	38	19	8	11	67	46	+21	46	5th	-	-	-	-	-
1926–27	Division One	1	John "Sailor" Hunter	38	23	5	10	81	52	+29	51	2nd	-	-	-	-	-
1927–28	Division One	1	John "Sailor" Hunter	38	23	9	6	92	46	+46	55	3rd	QF	-	-	-	-
1928–29	Division One	1	John "Sailor" Hunter	38	20	10	8	85	66	+19	50	3rd	QF	-	-	-	-
1929–30	Division One	1	John "Sailor" Hunter	38	25	5	8	104	48	+56	55	2nd	R3	-	-	-	-
1930–31	Division One	1	John "Sailor" Hunter	38	24	8	6	102	42	+60	56	3rd	RU	-	-	-	-
1931–32	Division One	1	John "Sailor" Hunter	38	30	6	2	119 (Note: This total stands as a record for the highest number of league goals scored by Motherwell in a season.)	31	+88	66	1st (Note: This was Motherwell's first, and to this day only, top-flight title success.)	QF	-	-	-	-
1932–33	Division One	1	John "Sailor" Hunter	38	27	5	6	114	53	+61	59	2nd	RU	-	-	-	-
1933–34	Division One	1	John "Sailor" Hunter	38	29	4	5	97	45	+52	62	2nd	SF	-	-	-	-
1934–35	Division One	1	John "Sailor" Hunter	38	15	10	13	83	64	+19	40	7th	QF	-	-	-	-
1935–36	Division One	1	John "Sailor" Hunter	38	18	12	8	77	58	+19	48	4th	QF	-	-	-	-
1936–37	Division One	1	John "Sailor" Hunter	38	22	7	9	96	54	+42	51	4th	QF	-	-	-	-
1937–38	Division One	1	John "Sailor" Hunter	38	17	10	11	78	69	+9	44	5th	QF	-	-	-	-
1938–39	Division One	1	John "Sailor" Hunter	38	16	5	17	82	86	−4	37	12th	RU	-	-	-	-
1939–40	Division One	1	John "Sailor" Hunter	5	2	1	2	14	12	+2	5	8th (Note: The 1939–40 season was suspended following the outbreak of the Second World War.) (Note: The club participated in the Scottish War Emergency Cup as an alternative)	- (Note: Scottish Cup was suspended following the outbreak of the Second World War.)	-	-	-	-
No competitive football was played between 1939 and 1946 due to the Second World War
1946–47	Division One	1	George Stevenson	30	12	5	13	58	54	+4	29	8th	SF	GS	-	-	John Brown (16)
1947–48	Division One	1	George Stevenson	30	13	3	14	45	47	−2	29	8th	R3	GS	-	-	Wilson Humphries (19)
1948–49	Division One	1	George Stevenson	30	10	5	15	44	49	−5	25	12th	R2	GS	-	-	Davie Mathie (13)
1949–50	Division One	1	George Stevenson	30	10	5	15	53	58	−5	25	10th	R1	GS	-	-	Archie Kelly (15)
1950–51	Division One	1	George Stevenson	30	11	6	13	58	65	−7	28	9th	RU	W (Note: This was Motherwell's first, and to this day, only League Cup win.)	-	-	Jim Forrest (14)
1951–52	Division One	1	George Stevenson	30	12	11	7	51	57	−6	31	7th	W (Note: This was Motherwell's first ever Scottish Cup win.)	SF	-	-	Archie Kelly (20)
1952–53	Division One	1	George Stevenson	30	10	5	15	57	80	−23	25	15th	R3	GS	-	-	Archie Kelly (19)
1953–54	Division Two	2	George Stevenson	30	21	3	6	109	43	+66	45	1st	SF	GS	-	-	Jackie Hunter (28)
1954–55	Division One	1	George Stevenson	30	9	4	17	42	62	−20	22	15th (Note: Motherwell were spared of relegation due to Division One being increased to 18 teams for the following season.)	QF	RU	-	-	Jackie Hunter (8)
1955–56	Division One	1	Bobby Ancell	34	11	11	12	53	59	−6	33	10th	R5	SF			Ian Gardiner (9)
1956–57	Division One	1	Bobby Ancell	34	16	5	13	72	66	+6	37	7th	R6	GS			Ian Gardiner (18)
1957–58	Division One	1	Bobby Ancell	34	12	8	14	68	67	+1	32	8th	SF	GS			Ian Gardiner (18)
1958–59	Division One	1	Bobby Ancell	34	18	8	8	83	50	+33	44	3rd	R3	GS			Ian St. John (24)
1959–60	Division One	1	Bobby Ancell	34	16	8	10	71	61	+13	40	5th	R3	QF			Ian St. John (21)
1960–61	Division One	1	Bobby Ancell	34	15	8	11	70	57	+13	38	5th	QF	GS			Ian St. John (18)
1961–62	Division One	1	Bobby Ancell	34	13	6	15	65	62	+3	32	9th	SF	QF			Pat Quinn (21)
1962–63	Division One	1	Bobby Ancell	34	10	11	13	60	63	−3	31	10th	R2	GS			Joe McBride (11)
1963–64	Division One	1	Bobby Ancell	34	9	11	14	51	62	−11	29	11th	QF	QF			Joe McBride (19)
1964–65	Division One	1	Bobby Ancell	34	11	8	16	45	54	−9	28	14th	SF	GS			Joe McBride (21)
1965–66	Division One	1	Bobby Howitt	34	12	4	18	52	69	−17	28	13th	R2	GS			Ian Thomson (10)
1966–67	Division One	1	Bobby Howitt	34	10	11	13	59	60	−1	31	10th	R1	GS			Bobby Campbell (18)
1967–68	Division One	1	Bobby Howitt	34	6	7	21	40	66	−26	19	17th	R1	GS			Dixie Deans (11)
1968–69	Division Two	2	Bobby Howitt	36	30	4	2	112	23	+89	64	1st	R1	GS			Dixie Deans (30)
1969–70	Division One	1	Bobby Howitt	34	11	10	13	49	51	−2	32	11th	QF	SF			Dixie Deans (15)
1970–71	Division One	1	Bobby Howitt	34	13	8	13	43	47	−4	34	10th	R3	GS			Dixie Deans (9)
1971–72	Division One	1	Bobby Howitt	34	11	7	16	49	69	−20	29	10th	QF	GS			Jim MacCabe (7)
1972–73	Division One	1	Bobby Howitt	34	11	9	14	38	48	−10	31	8th	R4	R2			Willie McClymont (6)
1973–74	Division One	1	Ian St. John	34	14	7	13	45	40	+5	35	9th	QF	R2			Bobby Graham (13)
1974–75	Division One	1	Willie McLean	34	14	5	15	52	57	−5	33	10th	SF	GS			Willie Pettigrew (20)
1975–76 (Note: The league was renamed the Scottish Premier Division)	Premier Division	1	Willie McLean	36	16	8	12	53	49	+4	40	4th	SF	GS			Willie Pettigrew (22)
1976–77	Premier Division	1	Willie McLean	36	10	12	14	57	60	−3	32	7th	QF	GS			Willie Pettigrew (21)
1977–78	Premier Division	1	Roger Hynd	36	13	17	16	45	52	−7	33	6th	R4	R2			Vic Davidson (8)
1978–79	Premier Division	1	Ally MacLeod	36	5	7	24	33	86	−53	17	10th	R3	R3			Willie Pettigrew (6)
1979–80	Division One	2	Ally MacLeod	39	16	11	12	59	48	+11	43	6th	R3	R2			Willie Irvine (13)
1980–81	Division One	2	Ally MacLeod	39	19	11	9	65	51	+14	49	8th	QF	GS			Albert Kidd (13)
1981–82	Division One	2	David Hay	39	26	9	4	92	36	+56	61	1st	R3	GS			Willie Irvine (20)
1982–83	Premier Division	1	Jock Wallace	36	11	5	20	39	73	−34	27	8th	R3	GS			Brian McClair (11)
1983–84	Premier Division	1	Jock Wallace; Succeeded by Bobby Watson	36	4	7	25	31	75	−44	15	10th	QF	GS			John Gahagan (11)
1984–85	Division One	2	Tommy McLean	36	21	8	10	62	26	+26	50	1st	SF	R2			Andy Harrow; Rab Stewart (9)
1985–86	Premier Division	1	Tommy McLean	36	7	6	23	33	66	−33	20	9th (Note: Relegation was suspended due to league reconstruction, therefore Motherwell retained their Premier Division status)	QF	R3			John Reilly (9)
1986–87	Premier Division	1	Tommy McLean	44	11	12	21	43	64	−21	34	8th	QF	SF			Andy Walker; Steve Kirk (10)
1987–88	Premier Division	1	Tommy McLean	44	13	10	21	37	56	−19	36	8th	R4	SF			Steve Cowan (9)
1988–89	Premier Division	1	Tommy McLean	36	7	13	16	35	44	−9	27	9th	R4	R3			Steve Kirk (14)
1989–90	Premier Division	1	Tommy McLean	36	11	12	13	43	47	−4	34	6th	R4	R3			(England) Nick Cusack (11)
1990–91	Premier Division	1	Tommy McLean	36	12	9	15	51	50	−1	33	6th	W	QF			Dougie Arnott (14)
1991–92	Premier Division	1	Tommy McLean	44	10	14	20	43	61	−18	34	10th	R4	R2	UEFA Cup; Winners' Cup	R1	Dougie Arnott (8)
1992–93	Premier Division	1	Tommy McLean	44	11	13	20	46	62	−16	35	8th	R3	R3			Steve Kirk (10)
1993–94	Premier Division	1	Tommy McLean	44	20	14	10	58	43	+15	54	3rd	R4	R3			(Republic of Ireland) Tommy Coyne (12)
1994–95	Premier Division	1	Alex McLeish	36	14	12	10	50	50	0	54	2nd (Note: The first season in which teams are awarded 3 points for a win. Before this season, 2 points were awarded for each win)	R4	R3	UEFA Cup	R1	(Republic of Ireland) Tommy Coyne (16)
1995–96	Premier Division	1	Alex McLeish	36	9	12	15	28	39	−11	39	8th	R3	QF	UEFA Cup	PR	Willie Falconer (5)
1996–97	Premier Division	1	Alex McLeish	36	9	11	16	44	55	−11	38	8th	QF	R2			(Republic of Ireland) Tommy Coyne (11)
1997–98	Premier Division	1	Alex McLeish	36	9	7	20	46	64	−18	34	9th	R4	QF			(Republic of Ireland) Tommy Coyne (15)
1998–99 (Note: The league was renamed the Scottish Premier League)	Premier League	1	(Finland) Harri Kampman; Succeeded by Billy Davies	36	10	11	15	35	54	−19	41	7th	R5	R3			(Republic of Ireland) Owen Coyle; John Spencer (7)
1999–2000	Premier League	1	Billy Davies	36	14	10	12	49	63	−14	52	4th	R5	QF			John Spencer (11)
2000–01	Premier League	1	Billy Davies	38	12	17	19	42	56	−14	43	8th	R3	R4			(Northern Ireland) Stuart Elliott (12)
2001–02	Premier League	1	Billy Davies; Succeeded by Eric Black; Succeeded by (England) Terry Butcher	38	11	7	20	49	69	−20	40	11th	R3	R2			(Northern Ireland) Stuart Elliott (11)
2002–03	Premier League	1	(England) Terry Butcher	38	7	7	24	45	71	−26	28	12th (Note: Motherwell were spared of relegation as Falkirk did not meet the SPL stadium criteria)	SF	R3			James McFadden (13)
2003–04	Premier League	1	(England) Terry Butcher	38	12	10	16	42	49	−7	46	6th	QF	R2			David Clarkson (12)
2004–05	Premier League	1	(England) Terry Butcher	38	13	9	16	46	49	−3	48	6th	R3	RU			(Australia) Scott McDonald (15)
2005–06	Premier League	1	(England) Terry Butcher	38	13	10	15	55	61	−6	49	8th	R3	SF			(Australia) Scott McDonald (Republic of Ireland) Richie Foran (12)
2006–07	Premier League	1	Maurice Malpas	38	10	8	20	41	61	−20	38	10th	QF	QF			(Australia) Scott McDonald (15)
2007–08	Premier League	1	Mark McGhee	38	18	6	14	50	46	+4	60	3rd	R5	QF			(England) Chris Porter (18)
2008–09	Premier League	1	Mark McGhee	38	13	9	16	46	51	−5	48	7th	R5	R3	UEFA Cup	PO	David Clarkson (13)
2009–10	Premier League	1	(Republic of Ireland) Jim Gannon; Succeeded by Craig Brown	38	13	14	11	52	54	−2	53	5th	R4	QF	UEFA Europa League (Note: The UEFA Cup was re-named the Europa League.)	QR3	(England) Lukas Jutkiewicz (12)
2010–11 (Note: The 2010-11 season was their 125 anniversary season.)	Premier League	1	Craig Brown; Succeeded by Stuart McCall	38	13	7	18	40	60	−20	46	6th	RU	SF	UEFA Europa; League	PO	(England) John Sutton (England) Nick Blackman (10)
2011–12	Premier League	1	Stuart McCall	38	18	8	12	49	44	+5	62	3rd	QF	R3			(England) Michael Higdon (14)
2012–13	Premier League	1	Stuart McCall	38	18	9	11	67	51	+16	63	2nd	R4	R3	UEFA Champions; League (Note: Motherwell qualified for the Champions League as Rangers went into liquidation. They entered the Europa League upon exiting the Champions League.); UEFA Europa; League	QR3 PO	(England) Michael Higdon (26)
2013–14	Premiership (Note: The league was renamed the Scottish Premiership)	1	Stuart McCall	38	22	4	12	64	60	+4	70	2nd	R4	QF	UEFA Europa; League	QR3	(England) John Sutton (22)
2014–15	Premiership	1	Stuart McCall; Succeeded by (England) Ian Baraclough	38	10	6	22	38	63	−25	36	11th	R4	R3	UEFA Europa; League	QR2	(England) John Sutton (13)
2015–16	Premiership	1	(England) Ian Baraclough; Succeeded by Mark McGhee	38	15	5	18	47	63	−16	50	5th	R5	R3			(England) Louis Moult (15)
2016–17	Premiership	1	Mark McGhee; Succeeded by (Northern Ireland) Stephen Robinson	38	10	8	20	46	69	−23	38	9th	R4	R2			(England) Louis Moult (15)
2017–18	Premiership	1	(Northern Ireland) Stephen Robinson	38	13	9	16	43	49	−6	48	7th	RU	RU			(England) Louis Moult (8)
2018–19	Premiership	1	(Northern Ireland) Stephen Robinson	38	15	6	17	46	56	−10	51	8th	R4	QF			David Turnbull (15)
2019–20	Premiership (Note: 2019–20 Scottish Premiership suspended in March 2020 due to the COVID-19 pandemic in Scotland; season curtailed and standings at time of postponement declared final on 18 May 2020.)	1	(Northern Ireland) Stephen Robinson	30	14	4	12	41	38	+3	46	3rd	R5	R2			(Northern Ireland) Liam Donnelly (England) Chris Long (7)
2020–21	Premiership	1	(Northern Ireland) Stephen Robinson; Succeeded by Graham Alexander	38	12	9	17	39	55	−16	45	8th	QF	R2	UEFA Europa; League	QR3	(England) Devante Cole (11)
2021–22	Premiership	1	Graham Alexander	38	12	10	16	42	61	−19	46	5th	QF	R2			Tony Watt (Netherlands) Kevin van Veen (9)
2022–23	Premiership	1	Graham Alexander; Succeeded by Steven Hammell; Succeeded by Stuart Kettlewell	38	14	8	16	53	51	+2	50	7th	R5	QF	UEFA Europa; Conference League	QR2	(Netherlands) Kevin van Veen (25)
2023–24	Premiership	1	Stuart Kettlewell	38	10	13	15	56	59	−3	43	9th	R5	R2			(Canada) Theo Bair (15)
2024–25	Premiership	1	Stuart Kettlewell; Succeeded by (Germany) Michael Wimmer	38	14	7	17	46	63	−17	49	8th	R4	SF			(Wales) Tom Sparrow (England) Callum Slattery (Zimbabwe) Tawanda Maswanhise (6)
2025–26	Premiership	1	(Denmark) Jens Berthel Askou	38	16	13	9	59	36	+23	61	4th	R5	SF			(Zimbabwe) Tawanda Maswanhise (17)
2026–27	Premiership	1	(Sweden) Alfred Johansson												UEFA Conference League		

== Key ==
Champions (Note: League and Cup)	Runners-up	Third Place (Note: League Only)	Semi-finals (Note: Cup Only)	Relegated

Key to league record

- Pld = Matches played
- W = Matches won
- D = Matches drawn
- L = Matches lost
- GF = Goals for
- GA = Goals against
- GD = Goal difference
- Pts = Points
- FP = Final position

Key to tier

- U = Unknown

Key to rounds

- PR = Preliminary Round
- QR3 = Qualifying Round 3
- PO = Play-Off match
- R1 = Round 1
- R2 = Round 2
- R3 = Round 3
- R4 = Round 4
- R5 = Round 5
- R6 = Round 6
- GS = Group stage
- QF = Quarter-finals
- SF = Semi-finals
- RU = Runners-up
- W = Winners
