= 1997–98 Sheffield Wednesday F.C. season =

English football club season

Sheffield Wednesday F.C.
1997–98 season
- Chairman: Dave Richards
- Manager: David Pleat (until 3 November); Peter Shreeves (caretaker from 3 to 14 November); Ron Atkinson (from 14 November)
- FA Premier League: 16th
- FA Cup: Fourth round
- League Cup: Second round
- Top goalscorer: League: Paolo Di Canio (12); All: Paolo Di Canio (14)
- Highest home attendance: 39,427 (vs. Manchester United, FA Premier League)
- Lowest home attendance: 11,120 (vs. Grimsby Town, League Cup)
- Average home league attendance: 28,706 (league)

The 1997–98 season was Sheffield Wednesday F.C.'s 131st season. They competed in the twenty-team FA Premier League, the top tier of English football, finishing sixteenth.

== Season summary ==
Having narrowly missed out on a UEFA Cup place in 1996–97, the club record £5.7 million signing of Italian striker Paolo Di Canio from Celtic gave Owls fans hopes of another challenge for Europe. But it was not to be, and by the time they lost 6–1 to Manchester United in November, relegation was looking a real possibility. Manager David Pleat was swiftly sacked, and Ron Atkinson – manager of the 1991 promotion and League Cup winning side – returned to the manager's seat on a short-term contract. He achieved safety by a margin of four points, in 16th place on 44 points by virtue of goal difference (three other sides had finished on 44 points), and was disappointed on being told that his contract would not be renewed. He was succeeded by Danny Wilson, a former Owls player who played for them in the early, more successful part of the decade.

== Final league table ==
Pos	Team	Pld	W	D	L	GF	GA	GD	Pts	Qualification or relegation
14	Tottenham Hotspur	38	11	11	16	44	56	−12	44	
15	Wimbledon	38	10	14	14	34	46	−12	44	
16	Sheffield Wednesday	38	12	8	18	52	67	−15	44	
17	Everton	38	9	13	16	41	56	−15	40	
18	Bolton Wanderers (R)	38	9	13	16	41	61	−20	40	Relegation to the Football League First Division

Source: Premier League
Rules for classification: 1) points; 2) goal difference; 3) number of goals scored.
(R) Relegated

Results summary

Overall								Home						Away					
Pld	W	D	L	GF	GA	GD	Pts	W	D	L	GF	GA	GD	W	D	L	GF	GA	GD
38	12	8	18	52	67	−15	44	9	5	5	30	26	+4	3	3	13	22	41	−19

Source: 1997-98 FA Premier League table

Results by round

Round	1	2	3	4	5	6	7	8	9	10	11	12	13	14	15	16	17	18	19	20	21	22	23	24	25	26	27	28	29	30	31	32	33	34	35	36	37	38
Ground	A	H	A	A	H	A	H	H	A	H	A	H	A	H	H	A	H	A	H	H	A	H	A	H	A	H	H	A	H	A	A	H	A	H	A	A	H	A
Result	L	L	D	L	W	L	D	L	D	W	L	L	L	W	W	W	W	L	L	D	D	W	W	D	L	D	W	L	W	L	L	W	L	D	L	W	L	L
Position	17	18	16	18	15	19	19	19	18	16	17	18	20	19	16	14	13	13	14	14	15	12	11	10	14	12	12	13	12	13	13	13	14	14	14	13	14	16

Source: 11v11.com: 1997-98 Sheffield Wednesday results
A = Away; H = Home; W = Win; D = Draw; L = Loss

== Results ==
Sheffield Wednesday's score comes first

=== Legend ===
Win	Draw	Loss

=== FA Premier League ===
Date	Opponent	Venue	Result	Attendance	Scorers
9 August 1997	Newcastle United	A	1–2	36,711	Carbone
13 August 1997	Leeds United	H	1–3	31,520	Hyde
23 August 1997	Wimbledon	A	1–1	11,503	Di Canio
27 August 1997	Blackburn Rovers	A	2–7	19,618	Carbone (2)
30 August 1997	Leicester City	H	1–0	24,851	Carbone (pen)
13 September 1997	Liverpool	A	1–2	34,705	Collins
20 September 1997	Coventry City	H	0–0	21,087	
24 September 1997	Derby County	H	2–5	22,391	Di Canio, Carbone (pen)
27 September 1997	Aston Villa	A	2–2	32,044	Collins, Whittingham
4 October 1997	Everton	H	3–1	24,486	Carbone (2, 1 pen), Di Canio
19 October 1997	Tottenham Hotspur	A	2–3	25,097	Collins, Di Canio
25 October 1997	Crystal Palace	H	1–3	22,072	Collins
1 November 1997	Manchester United	A	1–6	55,259	Whittingham
8 November 1997	Bolton Wanderers	H	5–0	25,027	Di Canio, Whittingham, Booth (3)
22 November 1997	Arsenal	H	2–0	34,373	Booth, Whittingham
29 November 1997	Southampton	A	3–2	15,244	Atherton, Collins, Di Canio
8 December 1997	Barnsley	H	2–1	29,086	Stefanović, Di Canio
13 December 1997	West Ham United	A	0–1	24,344	
20 December 1997	Chelsea	H	1–4	28,334	Pembridge
26 December 1997	Blackburn Rovers	H	0–0	33,502	
28 December 1997	Leicester City	A	1–1	20,800	Booth
10 January 1998	Newcastle United	H	2–1	29,446	Di Canio, Newsome
17 January 1998	Leeds United	A	2–1	33,166	Newsome, Booth
31 January 1998	Wimbledon	H	1–1	22,655	Mark Pembridge
7 February 1998	Coventry City	A	0–1	18,375	
14 February 1998	Liverpool	H	3–3	35,405	Carbone, Di Canio, Hinchcliffe
21 February 1998	Tottenham Hotspur	H	1–0	29,871	Di Canio
28 February 1998	Derby County	A	0–3	30,203	
7 March 1998	Manchester United	H	2–0	39,427	Atherton, Di Canio
14 March 1998	Bolton Wanderers	A	2–3	24,847	Booth, Atherton
28 March 1998	Arsenal	A	0–1	38,087	
4 April 1998	Southampton	H	1–0	29,677	Carbone
11 April 1998	Barnsley	A	1–2	18,692	Stefanović
13 April 1998	West Ham United	H	1–1	28,036	Magilton
19 April 1998	Chelsea	A	0–1	29,075	
25 April 1998	Everton	A	3–1	35,497	Pembridge (2), Di Canio
2 May 1998	Aston Villa	H	1–3	34,177	Sanetti
10 May 1998	Crystal Palace	A	0–1	16,876	

=== FA Cup ===
Round	Date	Opponent	Venue	Result	Attendance	Goalscorers
R3	3 January 1998	Watford	A	1–1	18,306	Alexandersson
R3R	14 January 1998	Watford	H	0–0 (won 5–3 on pens)	18,707	
R4	26 January 1998	Blackburn Rovers	H	0–3	15,940	

=== League Cup ===
Round	Date	Opponent	Venue	Result	Attendance	Goalscorers
R2 1st Leg	17 September 1997	Grimsby Town	A	0–2	6,429	
R2 2nd Leg	1 October 1997	Grimsby Town	H	3–2 (lost 3–4 on agg)	11,120	Davison (own goal), Di Canio (2)

== Players ==
=== First-team squad ===
Squad at end of season

Note: Flags indicate national team as defined under FIFA eligibility rules; some limited exceptions apply. Players may hold more than one non-FIFA nationality.

No.	Pos.	Nation	Player
1	GK	ENG	Kevin Pressman
2	DF	ENG	Peter Atherton (captain)
3	DF	NIR	Ian Nolan (Note: Nolan was born in Liverpool, England, but also qualified to represent Northern Ireland internationally and made his international debut for Northern Ireland in 1996.)
4	MF	WAL	Mark Pembridge
5	DF	ENG	Jon Newsome
6	DF	ENG	Des Walker
7	FW	ENG	Guy Whittingham
8	FW	ITA	Benito Carbone
10	FW	ENG	Andy Booth
11	FW	ITA	Paolo Di Canio
12	MF	ENG	Graham Hyde
13	GK	ENG	Matt Clarke
14	DF	SCO	Steve Nicol
15	FW	AUT	Christian Mayrleb
16	FW	ENG	Ritchie Humphreys

No.	Pos.	Nation	Player
17	DF	ENG	Lee Briscoe
18	DF	YUG	Dejan Stefanović
19	MF	ENG	Scott Oakes
20	DF	ENG	Andy Hinchcliffe
21	DF	MKD	Goce Sedloski
22	DF	BRA	Emerson Thome
23	FW	GHA	Junior Agogo
24	MF	NIR	Jim Magilton
25	MF	NOR	Petter Rudi
26	MF	SWE	Niclas Alexandersson
27	DF	ENG	Earl Barrett
28	MF	IRL	Alan Quinn
29	MF	ENG	Krystof Kotylo
30	FW	ITA	Francesco Sanetti

=== Left club during season ===
Note: Flags indicate national team as defined under FIFA eligibility rules; some limited exceptions apply. Players may hold more than one non-FIFA nationality.

No.	Pos.	Nation	Player
9	FW	ENG	David Hirst (to Southampton)
15	DF	FRA	Patrick Blondeau (to Bordeaux)
20	MF	ENG	Wayne Collins (to Fulham)
21	MF	AUS	Adem Poric (Note: Poric was born in London, England, but also qualified to represent Australia internationally and represented them at U-20 level.) (to Notts County)

No.	Pos.	Nation	Player
22	FW	ENG	O'Neill Donaldson (to Stoke City)
26	GK	ZIM	Bruce Grobbelaar (Note: Grobbelaar was born in Durban, South Africa, but was raised in Rhodesia (now Zimbabwe) from the age of two months and made his international debut for Rhodesia in 1977 and for Zimbabwe in 1980.) (to Oldham Athletic)
27	FW	ENG	Nigel Clough (on loan from Manchester City)

=== Reserve squad ===
Note: Flags indicate national team as defined under FIFA eligibility rules; some limited exceptions apply. Players may hold more than one non-FIFA nationality.

No.	Pos.	Nation	Player
—	GK	ENG	Stuart Jones
—	DF	IRL	Derek Geary
—	DF	ENG	Steve Haslam
—	DF	ENG	Kevin Nicholson
—	DF	ENG	Michael Simpkins

No.	Pos.	Nation	Player
—	DF	ENG	Simon Weaver
—	MF	ENG	Peter Holmes
—	MF	WAL	Ryan Jones (Note: Jones was born in Sheffield, England, but also qualified to represent Wales internationally and made his international debut for Wales in May 1994.)
—	MF	IRL	Mark McKeever (Note: McKeever was born in Derry, Northern Ireland, but also qualified to represent the Republic of Ireland internationally and represented them at U-19 and U-21 level.)
—	MF	ENG	Mark Platts

== Transfers ==
=== In ===
Date	Pos	Name	From	Fee
24 June 1997	DF	Patrick Blondeau	AS Monaco	£1,800,000
6 August 1997	FW	Paolo Di Canio	Celtic	£3,000,000
9 September 1997	MF	Jim Magilton	Southampton	£1,600,000
22 September 1997	GK	Bruce Grobbelaar	Oxford United	Nominal
2 October 1997	MF	Petter Rudi	Molde	£800,000
17 November 1997	DF	Derek Geary	Rivermount Boys	Signed
5 December 1997	MF	Niclas Alexandersson	IFK Göteborg	£750,000
6 December 1997	MF	Alan Quinn	Cherry Orchard	Nominal
30 January 1998	DF	Andy Hinchcliffe	Everton	£3,000,000
19 February 1998	DF	Goce Sedloski	Hajduk Split	£750,000
24 February 1998	DF	Earl Barrett	Everton	Free transfer
26 March 1998	GK	Stuart Jones	Weston-super-Mare	£20,000
26 March 1998	DF	Emerson Thome	Benfica	Signed
30 April 1998	FW	Francesco Sanetti	Genoa	Free transfer

=== Out ===
Date	Pos	Name	To	Fee
1 August 1997	DF	Dave Hercock	Kettering Town	Undisclosed
5 August 1997	MF	Orlando Trustfull	Vitesse Arnhem	£800,000
6 August 1997	MF	Regi Blinker	Celtic	£1,500,000
17 October 1997	FW	David Hirst	Southampton	£2,000,000
1 November 1997	DF	Steve Lenagh	Chesterfield	Monthly
1 January 1998	MF	James Simpkins	Chesterfield	Non-contract
14 January 1998	DF	Patrick Blondeau	Bordeaux	£1,200,000
22 January 1998	MF	Wayne Collins	Fulham	£400,000
13 March 1998	FW	O'Neill Donaldson	Stoke City	Free transfer
27 March 1998	MF	Adem Poric	Notts County	Free transfer

Transfers in: ▼£11,720,000
Transfers out: ▲£5,900,000
Total spending: ▼£5,820,000

== Statistics ==
=== Appearances and goals ===
No.	Pos	Nat	Player	Total		FA Premier League		FA Cup		League Cup	
No.	Pos	Nat	Player	Apps	Goals	Apps	Goals	Apps	Goals	Apps	Goals
Goalkeepers
1	GK	(England) ENG	Kevin Pressman	41	0	36	0	3	0	2	0
13	GK	(England) ENG	Matt Clarke	3	0	2+1	0	0	0	0	0
Defenders
2	DF	(England) ENG	Peter Atherton	31	3	27	3	3	0	1	0
3	DF	(Northern Ireland) NIR	Ian Nolan	32	0	27	0	3	0	2	0
5	DF	(England) ENG	Jon Newsome	29	2	25	2	3	0	1	0
6	DF	(England) ENG	Des Walker	43	0	38	0	3	0	2	0
14	DF	(Scotland) SCO	Steve Nicol	7	0	4+3	0	0	0	0	0
17	DF	(England) ENG	Lee Briscoe	9	0	3+4	0	0	0	1+1	0
18	DF	(Socialist Federal Republic of Yugoslavia) YUG	Dejan Stefanović	21	2	19+1	2	0	0	1	0
20	DF	(England) ENG	Andy Hinchcliffe	15	1	15	1	0	0	0	0
21	DF	(North Macedonia) MKD	Goce Sedloski	4	0	3+1	0	0	0	0	0
22	DF	(Brazil) BRA	Emerson Thome	6	0	6	0	0	0	0	0
27	DF	(England) ENG	Earl Barrett	10	0	10	0	0	0	0	0
Midfielders
4	MF	(Wales) WAL	Mark Pembridge	39	4	31+3	4	3	0	2	0
12	MF	(England) ENG	Graham Hyde	23	1	14+8	1	1	0	0	0
16	MF	(England) ENG	Ritchie Humphreys	11	0	2+5	0	0+3	0	0+1	0
19	MF	(England) ENG	Scott Oakes	6	0	0+4	0	0+2	0	0	0
24	MF	(Northern Ireland) NIR	Jim Magilton	22	1	13+6	1	1	0	2	0
25	MF	(Norway) NOR	Petter Rudi	25	0	19+3	0	3	0	0	0
26	MF	(Sweden) SWE	Niclas Alexandersson	8	1	5+1	0	2	1	0	0
28	MF	(Republic of Ireland) IRL	Alan Quinn	1	0	0+1	0	0	0	0	0
Forwards
7	FW	(England) ENG	Guy Whittingham	31	4	17+11	4	1	0	2	0
8	FW	(Italy) ITA	Benito Carbone	36	9	28+5	9	2	0	1	0
10	FW	(England) ENG	Andy Booth	25	7	21+2	7	2	0	0	0
11	FW	(Italy) ITA	Paolo Di Canio	40	14	34+1	12	3	0	2	2
15	FW	(Austria) AUT	Christian Mayrleb	3	0	0+3	0	0	0	0	0
23	FW	(Ghana) GHA	Junior Agogo	1	0	0+1	0	0	0	0	0
30	FW	(Italy) ITA	Francesco Sanetti	2	1	1+1	1	0	0	0	0
Players who left the club during the season
9	FW	(England) ENG	David Hirst	6	0	3+3	0	0	0	0	0
15	DF	(France) FRA	Patrick Blondeau	6	0	5+1	0	0	0	0	0
20	MF	(England) ENG	Wayne Collins	21	5	8+11	5	0	0	2	0
21	MF	(Australia) AUS	Adem Poric	4	0	0+3	0	0	0	0+1	0
22	FW	(England) ENG	O'Neill Donaldson	5	0	1+4	0	0	0	0	0
27	FW	(England) ENG	Nigel Clough	2	0	1	0	0	0	1	0

=== Starting 11 ===
Considering starts in all competitions

- GK: #1, (England) Kevin Pressman, 41
- RB: #2, (England) Peter Atherton, 31
- CB: #5, (England) Jon Newsome, 29
- CB: #6, (England) Des Walker, 43
- LB: #3, (Northern Ireland) Ian Nolan, 32
- CM: #25, (Norway) Petter Rudi, 22
- CM: #24, (Northern Ireland) Jim Magilton, 16 (#7, (England) Guy Whittingham, and #18, (Federal Republic of Yugoslavia) Dejan Stefanović, both have 20 starts)
- CM: #4, (Wales) Mark Pembridge, 36
- AM: #8, (Italy) Benito Carbone, 31
- CF: #10, (England) Andy Booth, 23
- CF: #11, (Italy) Paolo Di Canio, 39
