= 1996–97 Sheffield Wednesday F.C. season =

English football club season

Sheffield Wednesday
1996–97 season
- Chairman: Dave Richards
- Manager: David Pleat
- Premier League: 7th
- FA Cup: Quarter-finals
- League Cup: Second round
- Top goalscorer: League: Booth (10); All: Booth (13)
- Highest home attendance: 38,943 (vs. Liverpool, Premiership)
- Lowest home attendance: 7,499 (vs. Oxford United, League Cup)
- Average home league attendance: 25,714 (league)

The 1996–97 season was Sheffield Wednesday F.C.'s 130th season in existence. They competed in the twenty-team Premiership, the top tier of English football, finishing seventh.

== Season summary ==
A four-match winning start to the season saw Sheffield Wednesday top the Premiership and manager David Pleat receive Manager of the Month award for August, but they soon fell out of the title frame and in the end, despite losing just nine games in the league, they finished seventh in the final table - not even enough for UEFA Cup qualification; they could easily have finished higher had they not drawn as many as 15 games (making it 30 points they dropped). In the close season, Pleat paid a club record £5.7 million for Celtic's Italian forward Paolo Di Canio, giving his squad a much-needed boost to their hopes of challenging for honours.

== Final league table ==
Pos	Team	Pld	W	D	L	GF	GA	GD	Pts	Qualification or relegation
5	Aston Villa	38	17	10	11	47	34	+13	61	Qualification for the UEFA Cup first round (Note: Aston Villa was rewarded entry to the UEFA Cup through UEFA Fair Play ranking.)
6	Chelsea	38	16	11	11	58	55	+3	59	Qualification for the Cup Winners' Cup first round (Note: Chelsea qualified for the Cup Winners' Cup as FA Cup winners.)
7	Sheffield Wednesday	38	14	15	9	50	51	−1	57	
8	Wimbledon	38	15	11	12	49	46	+3	56	
9	Leicester City	38	12	11	15	46	54	−8	47	Qualification for the UEFA Cup first round (Note: Leicester City qualified for the UEFA Cup as League Cup winners.)

Source: Premier League
Rules for classification: 1) points; 2) goal difference; 3) number of goals scored.
Notes:

Results summary

Overall								Home						Away					
Pld	W	D	L	GF	GA	GD	Pts	W	D	L	GF	GA	GD	W	D	L	GF	GA	GD
38	14	15	9	50	51	−1	57	8	10	1	25	16	+9	6	5	8	25	35	−10

Source: Statto

Results by round

Round	1	2	3	4	5	6	7	8	9	10	11	12	13	14	15	16	17	18	19	20	21	22	23	24	25	26	27	28	29	30	31	32	33	34	35	36	37	38
Result	W	W	W	W	L	L	D	L	L	D	D	D	W	D	D	W	D	D	D	D	W	L	W	D	D	W	W	W	W	L	D	W	D	W	L	L	L	D
Position	6	1	1	1	1	5	5	7	7	9	8	9	9	10	10	9	9	9	10	9	8	8	8	8	8	8	8	6	5	5	7	6	6	6	6	7	7	7

Source: Statto.com
W = Win; D = Draw; L = Loss

== Results ==
Sheffield Wednesday's score comes first

=== Legend ===
Win	Draw	Loss

=== FA Premier League ===
Date	Opponent	Venue	Result	Attendance	Scorers
17 August 1996	Aston Villa	H	2–1	26,861	Humphreys, Whittingham
20 August 1996	Leeds United	A	2–0	31,011	Humphreys, Booth
24 August 1996	Newcastle United	A	2–1	36,452	Atherton, Whittingham
2 September 1996	Leicester City	H	2–1	17,657	Booth, Humphreys
7 September 1996	Chelsea	H	0–2	30,983	
16 September 1996	Arsenal	A	1–4	33,461	Booth
21 September 1996	Derby County	H	0–0	23,934	
28 September 1996	Everton	A	0–2	34,160	
12 October 1996	Wimbledon	A	2–4	10,512	Booth, Hyde
19 October 1996	Blackburn Rovers	H	1–1	22,191	Booth
26 October 1996	Coventry City	A	0–0	17,267	
2 November 1996	Southampton	H	1–1	20,106	Newsome
18 November 1996	Nottingham Forest	H	2–0	16,390	Trustfull, Carbone
23 November 1996	Sunderland	A	1–1	20,644	Oakes
30 November 1996	West Ham United	H	0–0	22,321	
7 December 1996	Liverpool	A	1–0	39,507	Whittingham
18 December 1996	Manchester United	H	1–1	37,671	Carbone
21 December 1996	Tottenham Hotspur	A	1–1	30,996	Nolan
26 December 1996	Arsenal	H	0–0	23,245	
28 December 1996	Chelsea	A	2–2	27,467	Pembridge, Stefanović
11 January 1997	Everton	H	2–1	24,175	Pembridge, Hirst
18 January 1997	Middlesbrough	A	2–4	29,485	Pembridge (2)
29 January 1997	Aston Villa	A	1–0	26,726	Booth
1 February 1997	Coventry City	H	0–0	21,793	
19 February 1997	Derby County	A	2–2	18,060	Collins, Hirst
22 February 1997	Southampton	A	3–2	15,062	Hirst (2), Booth
1 March 1997	Middlesbrough	H	3–1	28,206	Booth, Hyde, Pembridge (pen)
5 March 1997	Nottingham Forest	A	3–0	21,485	Carbone (2), Blinker
12 March 1997	Sunderland	H	2–1	20,294	Hirst, Stefanović
15 March 1997	Manchester United	A	0–2	55,267	
22 March 1997	Leeds United	H	2–2	30,373	Hirst, Booth
9 April 1997	Tottenham Hotspur	H	2–1	22,667	Atherton, Booth
13 April 1997	Newcastle United	H	1–1	33,798	Pembridge
19 April 1997	Wimbledon	H	3–1	26,957	Donaldson, Trustfull (2)
22 April 1997	Blackburn Rovers	A	1–4	20,845	Carbone (pen)
3 May 1997	West Ham United	A	1–5	24,960	Carbone
7 May 1997	Leicester City	A	0–1	20,793	
11 May 1997	Liverpool	H	1–1	38,943	Donaldson

=== FA Cup ===
Round	Date	Opponent	Venue	Result	Attendance	Goalscorers
R3	4 January 1997	Grimsby Town	H	7–1	20,590	Humphreys (2), Booth (2), Fickling (own goal), Hyde, Pembridge
R4	25 January 1997	Carlisle United	A	2–0	16,104	Whittingham, Booth
R5	16 February 1997	Bradford City	A	1–0	17,830	Humphreys
QF	9 March 1997	Wimbledon	H	0–2	25,032	

=== League Cup ===
Round	Date	Opponent	Venue	Result	Attendance	Goalscorers
R2 1st Leg	18 September 1996	Oxford United	H	1–1	7,499	Whittingham
R2 2nd Leg	24 September 1996	Oxford United	A	0–1 (lost 1–2 on agg)	6,863	

== Players ==
=== First-team squad ===
Squad at end of season

Note: Flags indicate national team as defined under FIFA eligibility rules; some limited exceptions apply. Players may hold more than one non-FIFA nationality.

No.	Pos.	Nation	Player
1	GK	ENG	Kevin Pressman
2	DF	ENG	Peter Atherton
3	DF	NIR	Ian Nolan (Note: Nolan was born in Liverpool, England, but also qualified to represent Northern Ireland internationally and made his international debut for Northern Ireland in 1996.)
4	MF	WAL	Mark Pembridge
5	DF	ENG	Jon Newsome
6	DF	ENG	Des Walker
7	FW	ENG	Guy Whittingham
8	FW	ITA	Benito Carbone
9	FW	ENG	David Hirst
10	FW	ENG	Andy Booth
11	MF	NED	Regi Blinker (Note: Blinker was born in Paramaribo, Suriname, but also qualified to represent the Netherlands internationally and made his international debut for the Netherlands in March 1993.)
12	MF	ENG	Graham Hyde

No.	Pos.	Nation	Player
13	GK	ENG	Matt Clarke
14	DF	SCO	Steve Nicol
17	DF	ENG	Lee Briscoe
18	DF	YUG	Dejan Stefanović
19	MF	ENG	Scott Oakes
20	MF	ENG	Wayne Collins
21	MF	WAL	Ryan Jones (Note: Jones was born in Sheffield, England, but also qualified to represent Wales internationally and made his international debut for Wales in May 1994.)
22	FW	ENG	O'Neill Donaldson
23	FW	ENG	Mike Williams
24	DF	ENG	Brian Linighan
25	MF	ENG	Ritchie Humphreys
26	MF	NED	Orlando Trustfull

=== Left club during season ===
Note: Flags indicate national team as defined under FIFA eligibility rules; some limited exceptions apply. Players may hold more than one non-FIFA nationality.

No.	Pos.	Nation	Player
8	FW	ENG	Mark Bright (to FC Sion)
15	MF	ENG	Chris Waddle (to Falkirk)

No.	Pos.	Nation	Player
16	MF	IRL	John Sheridan (Note: Sheridan was born in Stretford, England, but also qualified to represent the Republic of Ireland internationally and represented them at U-21 level before making his international debut for the Republic of Ireland in 1988.) (to Bolton Wanderers)

=== Reserve squad ===
Note: Flags indicate national team as defined under FIFA eligibility rules; some limited exceptions apply. Players may hold more than one non-FIFA nationality.

No.	Pos.	Nation	Player
—	DF	ENG	Matthew Daly
—	DF	ENG	David Billington
—	DF	ENG	Steve Haslam
—	DF	ENG	Simon Weaver

No.	Pos.	Nation	Player
—	MF	IRL	Mark McKeever (Note: McKeever was born in Derry, Northern Ireland, but also qualified to represent the Republic of Ireland internationally and represented them at U-19 and U-21 level.)
—	MF	AUS	Adem Poric (Note: Poric was born in London, England, but also qualified to represent Australia internationally and represented them at U-20 level.)
—	FW	ENG	Mark Platts
—	FW	GHA	Junior Agogo

== Transfers ==
=== In ===
Date	Pos.	Name	From	Fee
8 July 1996	FW	Andy Booth	Huddersfield Town	£2,700,000
11 July 1996	GK	Matt Clarke	Rotherham United	£325,000
7 August 1996	MF	Scott Oakes	Luton Town	£425,000
9 August 1996	MF	Wayne Collins	Crewe Alexandra	£600,000
20 August 1996	MF	Orlando Trustfull	Feyenoord	£750,000
1 September 1996	DF	Dave Hercock	Cambridge City	Free transfer
14 October 1996	FW	Benito Carbone	Inter Milan	£3,000,000
3 April 1997	DF	David Billington	Peterborough United	£500,000
15 April 1997	MF	Mark McKeever	Peterborough United	£500,000

=== Out ===
Date	Pos.	Name	To	Fee
1 June 1996	GK	Chris Woods	Colorado Rapids	Free transfer
17 June 1996	DF	Simon Stewart	Fulham	Free transfer
1 July 1996	FW	Darko Kovačević	Real Sociedad	Signed
26 July 1996	GK	Lance Key	Dundee United	Free transfer
1 August 1996	FW	Marc Degryse	PSV Eindhoven	Signed
15 August 1996	DF	David Faulkner	Darlington	Free transfer
12 September 1996	MF	Chris Waddle	Falkirk	Free transfer
19 December 1996	MF	John Sheridan	Bolton Wanderers	£180,000
1 January 1997	FW	Mark Bright	FC Sion	£70,000
11 March 1997	DF	Sam Sharman	Hull City	Free transfer
30 August 1997	DF	Matthew Daly	Sligo Rovers	Free

Transfers in: ▼£8,800,000
Transfers out: ▲£250,000
Total spending: ▼£8,550,000

== Statistics ==
=== Appearances and goals ===
No.	Pos	Nat	Player	Total		Premier League		FA Cup		League Cup	
No.	Pos	Nat	Player	Apps	Goals	Apps	Goals	Apps	Goals	Apps	Goals
Goalkeepers
1	GK	(England) ENG	Kevin Pressman	44	0	38	0	4	0	2	0
13	GK	(England) ENG	Matt Clarke	1	0	0+1	0	0	0	0	0
Defenders
2	DF	(England) ENG	Peter Atherton	43	2	37	2	4	0	2	0
3	DF	(Northern Ireland) NIR	Ian Nolan	44	1	38	1	4	0	2	0
5	DF	(England) ENG	Jon Newsome	14	1	10	1	3	0	1	0
6	DF	(England) ENG	Des Walker	41	0	36	0	4	0	1	0
14	DF	(Scotland) SCO	Steve Nicol	28	0	19+4	0	2+1	0	0+2	0
17	DF	(England) ENG	Lee Briscoe	6	0	5+1	0	0	0	0	0
18	DF	(Federal Republic of Yugoslavia) YUG	Dejan Stefanović	31	2	27+2	2	1	0	1	0
Midfielders
4	MF	(Wales) WAL	Mark Pembridge	39	7	33+1	6	4	1	1	0
11	MF	(Netherlands) NED	Regi Blinker	36	1	15+18	1	1	0	2	0
12	MF	(England) ENG	Graham Hyde	24	3	15+4	2	4	1	1	0
19	MF	(England) ENG	Scott Oakes	19	1	7+11	1	0	0	0+1	0
20	MF	(England) ENG	Wayne Collins	13	1	8+4	1	1	0	0	0
25	MF	(England) ENG	Ritchie Humphreys	35	6	14+15	3	3+1	3	1+1	0
26	MF	(Netherlands) NED	Orlando Trustfull	22	3	9+10	3	0+1	0	2	0
Forwards
7	FW	(England) ENG	Guy Whittingham	37	5	29+3	3	3	1	2	1
8	FW	(Italy) ITA	Benito Carbone	27	6	24+1	6	2	0	0	0
9	FW	(England) ENG	David Hirst	28	6	20+5	6	0+2	0	1	0
10	FW	(England) ENG	Andy Booth	41	13	32+3	10	4	3	2	0
22	FW	(England) ENG	O'Neill Donaldson	5	2	2+3	2	0	0	0	0
23	FW	(England) ENG	Mike Williams	2	0	0+1	0	0	0	1	0
Players who left the club during the season
8	FW	(England) ENG	Mark Bright	1	0	0+1	0	0	0	0	0
16	MF	(Republic of Ireland) IRL	John Sheridan	2	0	0+2	0	0	0	0	0
