= Phil O'Donnell (footballer) =

Scottish footballer (1972–2007)

- O'Donnell with Motherwell F.C.

Personal information
- Full name: Philip O'Donnell
- Date of birth: 25 March 1972
- Place of birth: Bellshill, Lanarkshire, Scotland
- Date of death: 29 December 2007 (aged 35)
- Place of death: Wishaw, Lanarkshire, Scotland
- Height: 5 ft 10 in (1.78 m)
- Position: Midfielder

Senior career*
Years	Team	Apps	(Gls)
1990–1994	Motherwell	124	(15)
1994–1999	Celtic	90	(15)
1999–2003	Sheffield Wednesday	20	(0)
2004–2007	Motherwell	77	(8)
Total		311	(38)

International career
1991–1993	Scotland U-21	8	(0)
1993	Scotland	1	(0)
- * Club domestic league appearances and goals

Philip O'Donnell (25 March 1972 – 29 December 2007) was a Scottish professional footballer who played as a midfielder for Motherwell, Celtic and Sheffield Wednesday. He also earned one international cap for Scotland and twice won the PFA Scotland Young Player of the Year award. He died after suffering cardiac arrest while playing for Motherwell against Dundee United on 29 December 2007, aged 35.

== Career ==
=== Motherwell ===
O'Donnell was born on 25 March 1972 in Bellshill, North Lanarkshire, a few miles away from Motherwell's Fir Park ground. O'Donnell began his career with his local team, making his first team debut in the 1990–91 season against St Mirren and soon became a regular first team player. He won a Scottish Cup winner's medal after scoring with a diving header to put Motherwell 2–1 up in a 4–3 victory over Dundee United in the final that year. Ally McCoist commentating on the match describing him as being "brave as a lion". That result earned Motherwell entry to European competition for the first time and O'Donnell became the club's youngest player in Europe, playing a tie against Polish side GKS Katowice.

He won the PFA Scotland Young Player of the Year award in 1992 and 1994 and earned one cap for the Scotland national football team, playing for 15 minutes as a substitute against Switzerland on 8 September 1993, replacing David Bowman. This form made him a target for bigger clubs and he moved to Celtic in September 1994; the fee of £1.75m was the highest Motherwell had received for a player, a record that lasted until the same club signed David Turnbull in 2020.

=== Celtic ===
O'Donnell scored two goals in his debut for Celtic against Partick Thistle and went on to win another Scottish Cup in 1995. He also earned his sole league winner's medal with the club in 1998, but injuries proved to be a major concern and his appearances for the club were limited. In 1999 O'Donnell was among a number of players who failed to agree terms on a new contract with Celtic chairman Fergus McCann and instead moved on.

=== Sheffield Wednesday ===
After leaving Celtic as a free agent, O'Donnell signed for Sheffield Wednesday later that year. He made his debut against Everton on 11 September 1999, but injuries continued to curtail his career and he played just one match during his first season (when the club were relegated from the Premier League). He went on to play just 20 times in four years for Sheffield Wednesday (scoring once in a League Cup quarter final tie against Watford) and was given a free transfer at the time of their relegation to Division Two in 2003.

=== Return to Motherwell ===
O'Donnell returned to Scotland, where Motherwell offered him the chance to train with them again. The Fir Park outfit re-signed him in January 2004, allowing him the chance to appear alongside his nephew, David Clarkson and earning him the club nickname, "Uncle Phil". He was also the uncle of St Mirren midfielder Stephen O'Donnell and Brian Dempsie, who had also played for Motherwell. In his second spell at Motherwell, he appeared in another cup final, this time being on the losing side as Rangers defeated them 5–1 in the 2005 Scottish League Cup. The following season, he replaced Scott Leitch as club captain.

== Death ==
On 29 December 2007, O'Donnell collapsed during a game against Dundee United just as he was about to be substituted. He was treated on the pitch for about five minutes by the Motherwell and Dundee United club doctors before being taken by ambulance to Wishaw General Hospital. However, he was pronounced dead at 17:18 hours. He was 35 years of age.

A postmortem examination was carried out on 1 January 2008 and it was revealed O'Donnell died of left ventricular failure. His funeral was on 4 January, at St Mary's Church in Hamilton. He was then buried in the town's Bent Cemetery.

He was survived by his wife Eileen, their daughters Megan and Olivia and sons Christopher and Luc, aged twelve, six, ten and four years respectively.

== Tributes ==
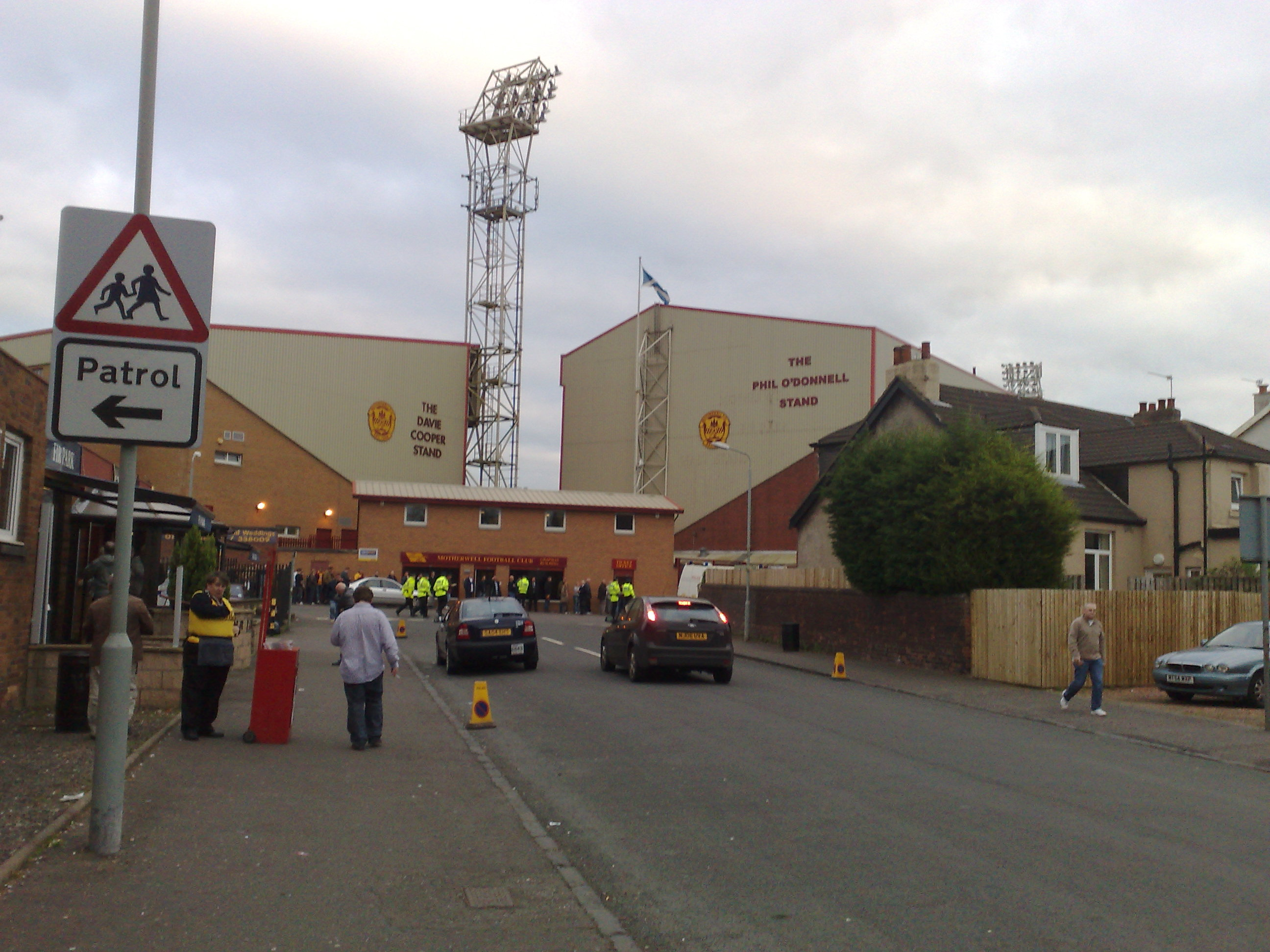
The Phil O'Donnell Stand

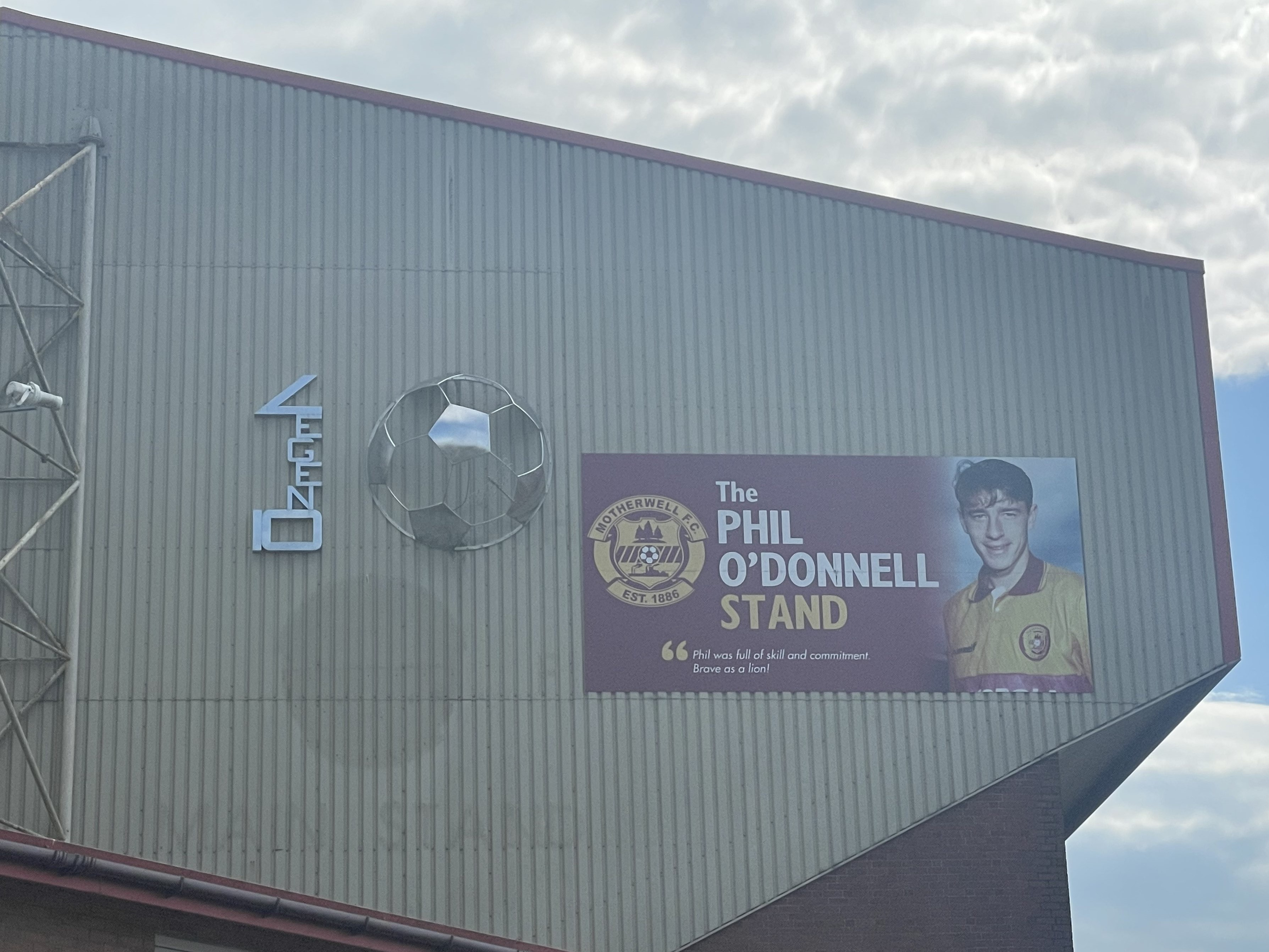
The stainless-steel permanent memorial to O'Donnell, erected in November 2011.

Former Scottish First Minister Jack McConnell, MSP for Motherwell and Wishaw, was among those to pay tribute. He hailed the midfielder as a "great professional."

Motherwell and other fans laid flowers, scarves, strips and other mementos at the gates of Fir Park. The club's scheduled SPL game against Hibernian at Easter Road the following Wednesday was postponed, along with the club's home game with Celtic the following Sunday out of respect. Scottish Premier League chairman Lex Gold said: "We understand from Phil's family that they would appreciate it if the Motherwell v Celtic game scheduled for 6 January 2008 could be postponed. Both clubs are happy to meet the request and we have called the game off." On 31 December the SPL postponed the Celtic v Rangers fixture scheduled for 2 January 2008, following a request by O'Donnell's former club Celtic, which was agreed by Rangers. These postponements contributed to fixture congestion at the end of the 2007–08 season, which required the 2007–08 Scottish Premier League season to be extended when Rangers reached the 2008 UEFA Cup Final.

Players on 30 December in Premier League matches between Derby County and Blackburn Rovers and Manchester City and Liverpool, wore black bands in his honour. Sheffield Wednesday's matches at Hull City and at home to Preston North End were preceded by a minute's applause as a mark of respect to their former player, with the Hillsborough flags flying at half mast. All Premier League matches in the New Year programme were preceded with either a minute of applause or silence in O'Donnell's memory. While playing for Everton, James McFadden, a former Motherwell player, dedicated his goal to O'Donnell in Everton's 2–0 win at Middlesbrough by pointing solemnly to his black armband and then towards the sky.

Nottingham Forest opted not to show their respects before their Football League One match with Huddersfield Town on New Year's Day. Forest manager Colin Calderwood, himself a Scottish former international with 36 caps, explained: "The fact that it was a boy in Scotland, does that make it any different to a boy in Colombia?" Calderwood later apologised for any offence caused by the comments, after he had been appointed manager of Hibernian in the SPL in November 2010.

Thousands of tributes from around the world were posted on the Internet. The club received hundreds of written tributes from fans as far as Korea and Ukraine, as well as many emotional messages from Sevilla FC, comparing O'Donnell's death to the similar fate of their player Antonio Puerta that August. Sevilla director of football Monchi said, "This is terrible news. Right now, my thoughts are with Phil's family and everybody at Motherwell. Unfortunately, with the death of Phil O'Donnell, Motherwell have suffered a similar tragedy to ours. Antonio Puerta died at the beginning of the season and I know how terrible the whole experience is. Sevilla will be available to help in any way that we are able, to heal the pain and sadness of this tragic loss."

Motherwell announced the Main Stand at Fir Park would be renamed the "Phil O'Donnell Stand" as a permanent tribute and his team-mates paid their own personal tribute by having his signature embroidered on their strips for the remainder of the 2007–08 season. In November 2011, a permanent memorial to O'Donnell was erected on the side of the stand bearing his name.

On 25 May 2008, a benefit match was held at Celtic Park in memory of O'Donnell with the proceeds going to various charities. The match was between a Celtic side drawn from their 1998 title-winning squad and a Motherwell side drawn from their 1991 Scottish Cup win. Other players such as David Clarkson and James McFadden played in the game. Henrik Larsson described the match as "a sad occasion but at the same time it's a kind of celebration for everything." The match finished 5–1, in front of 60,000.

There is an annual sponsored walk, started on 29 December 2008, to honour O'Donnell's memory. The walk starts from Fir Park and ends at Celtic Park, the homes of two of O'Donnell's former clubs. The money raised from the walk goes directly to charities such as the British Heart Foundation and Mary's Meals.

In December 2010, a number of fellow Scottish footballers that had played alongside Phil had thought of his family announced they would trek up Cotopaxi in Ecuador in memory of Phil to raise £100,000 for the British Heart Foundation.

Since O'Donnell's death in 2007, his nephew David Clarkson is the only player to have worn the number 10 shirt, which he had up until his departure in 2009. Since then this number, although not retired, has not been issued to any subsequent player.

== Career statistics ==
=== Club ===
Appearances and goals by club, season and competition
Club	Season	League			National Cup (Note: Includes Scottish Cup, FA Cup)		League Cup (Note: Includes Scottish League Cup, Football League Cup)		Other		Total	
Club	Season	Division	Apps	Goals	Apps	Goals	Apps	Goals	Apps	Goals	Apps	Goals
Motherwell	1990–91	Premier Division	12	0	5	1	0	0	—		17	1
Motherwell	1991–92	Premier Division	42	4	3	1	1	0	2 (Note: Appearances in UEFA Cup Winners' Cup)	0	48	5
Motherwell	1992–93	Premier Division	32	4	0	0	1	0	—		33	4
Motherwell	1993–94	Premier Division	35	7	3	0	2	0	—		40	7
Motherwell	1994–95	Premier Division	3	0	—		2	0	1 (Note: Appearance(s) in UEFA Cup)	0	6	0
Motherwell	Total		124	15	11	2	6	0	3	0	144	17
Celtic	1994–95	Premier Division	27	6	5	1	—		—		32	7
Celtic	1995–96	Premier Division	15	3	1	0	2	0	2	0	20	3
Celtic	1996–97	Premier Division	19	2	6	2	0	0	1	0	26	4
Celtic	1997–98	Premier Division	14	2	1	0	4	0	2	0	21	2
Celtic	1998–99	Premier League	15	2	3	1	1	0	3	1	22	4
Celtic	Total		90	15	16	4	7	0	8	1	121	20
Sheffield Wednesday	1999–2000	Premier League	1	0	0	0	0	0	—		1	0
Sheffield Wednesday	2000–01	First Division	11	0	0	0	1	0	—		12	0
Sheffield Wednesday	2001–02	First Division	8	0	0	0	4	1	—		12	1
Sheffield Wednesday	2002–03	First Division	0	0	0	0	0	0	—		0	0
Sheffield Wednesday	Total		20	0	0	0	5	1	0	0	25	1
Motherwell	2003–04	Premier League	9	0	3	0	—		—		12	0
Motherwell	2004–05	Premier League	18	3	0	0	5	2	—		23	5
Motherwell	2005–06	Premier League	29	2	1	0	2	0	—		32	2
Motherwell	2006–07	Premier League	3	1	0	0	0	0	—		3	1
Motherwell	2007–08	Premier League	18	2	0	0	1	0	—		19	2
Motherwell	Total		77	8	4	0	8	2	—		89	10
Career total			311	38	31	6	26	3	11	1	379	48

=== International ===
Appearances and goals by national team and year
National team	Year	Apps	Goals
Scotland	1993	1	0
Total		1	0

== Honours ==
Motherwell

- Scottish Cup: 1990–91

Celtic

- Scottish Cup: 1994–95; runner-up: 1998–99
- Scottish Premier Division: 1997–98

Individual

- PFA Scotland Young Player of the Year: 1991–92, 1993–94

== See also ==
- List of association footballers who died while playing
