= 2000–01 Sheffield Wednesday F.C. season =

English football club season

Sheffield Wednesday F.C.
2000–01 season
- Chairman: Howard Culley (succeeded by Geoff Hulley)
- Manager: Paul Jewell (until 12 February); Peter Shreeves (from 12 February)
- Division One: 17th
- FA Cup: Fourth round
- League Cup: Quarter-final
- Top goalscorer: League: Sibon (13); All: Sibon (15)
- Highest home attendance: 38,433 (vs. Sheffield United; Division One)
- Lowest home attendance: 4,773 (vs. Oldham Athletic; League Cup)
- Average home league attendance: 19,268 (League games only)

During the 2000–01 English football season, Sheffield Wednesday F.C. competed in the Football League First Division.

== Season summary ==
Peter Shreeves remained at Sheffield Wednesday for the 2000–01 season as assistant to their new manager Paul Jewell. But Jewell was unable to mount a promotion challenge and he was sacked the following February with the Owls hovering just above the Division One relegation zone. Shreeves was given a permanent contract to take charge of the first team and he guided them to a 17th-place finish.

== Final league table ==
Pos	Team	Pld	W	D	L	GF	GA	GD	Pts
15	Norwich City	46	14	12	20	46	58	−12	54
16	Barnsley	46	15	9	22	49	62	−13	54
17	Sheffield Wednesday	46	15	8	23	52	71	−19	53
18	Grimsby Town	46	14	10	22	43	62	−19	52
19	Stockport County	46	11	18	17	58	65	−7	51

Rules for classification: 1) Points; 2) Goal difference; 3) Goals scored

Results summary

Overall								Home						Away					
Pld	W	D	L	GF	GA	GD	Pts	W	D	L	GF	GA	GD	W	D	L	GF	GA	GD
46	15	8	23	52	71	−19	53	9	4	10	34	38	−4	6	4	13	18	33	−15

Source: 2000-01 Football League First Division table

Results by round

Round	1	2	3	4	5	6	7	8	9	10	11	12	13	14	15	16	17	18	19	20	21	22	23	24	25	26	27	28	29	30	31	32	33	34	35	36	37	38	39	40	41	42	43	44	45	46
Ground	A	H	A	H	H	H	A	H	A	H	A	A	H	A	H	A	A	H	A	A	H	H	A	H	A	A	H	A	H	H	A	H	A	A	H	H	A	H	A	H	A	H	A	H	A	H
Result	D	L	W	D	L	L	L	L	L	L	L	L	W	W	D	L	W	W	L	L	W	L	D	L	L	D	W	L	L	L	L	W	W	L	W	D	W	W	W	L	L	W	D	W	L	D
Position	9	15	10	10	20	22	23	23	24	24	24	24	23	22	21	22	20	18	19	20	17	19	21	21	23	22	21	22	22	24	24	21	21	22	19	19	18	17	15	17	17	16	18	14	17	17

Source: 11v11.com: 2000-01 Sheffield Wednesday results
A = Away; H = Home; W = Win; D = Draw; L = Loss

== Results ==
Sheffield Wednesday's score comes first

=== Legend ===
Win	Draw	Loss

=== Football League First Division ===
Date	Opponent	Venue	Result	Attendance	Scorers
13 August 2000	Wolverhampton Wanderers	A	1–1	19,086	Booth
19 August 2000	Huddersfield Town	H	2–3	22,704	Booth, Hinchcliffe (pen)
26 August 2000	Grimsby Town	A	1–0	7,755	Di Piedi
28 August 2000	Blackburn Rovers	H	1–1	15,646	Westwood
9 September 2000	Wimbledon	H	0–5	15,856	
13 September 2000	Nottingham Forest	H	0–1	15,700	
16 September 2000	Tranmere Rovers	A	0–2	9,352	
23 September 2000	Preston North End	H	1–3	17,379	Morrison
30 September 2000	Gillingham	A	0–2	9,099	
8 October 2000	West Bromwich Albion	H	1–2	15,338	Morrison
14 October 2000	Portsmouth	A	1–2	13,376	Morrison
17 October 2000	Burnley	A	0–1	16,372	
22 October 2000	Birmingham City	H	1–0	14,695	Harkness
25 October 2000	Queens Park Rangers	A	2–1	10,353	Cooke, Quinn
28 October 2000	Fulham	H	3–3	17,559	Sibon, Morrison, Westwood
4 November 2000	Crystal Palace	A	1–4	15,333	Sibon (pen)
7 November 2000	Watford	A	3–1	11,166	Jobson, Crane, Quinn
11 November 2000	Norwich City	H	3–2	16,956	Hinchcliffe (pen), Crane, Di Piedi
18 November 2000	Barnsley	A	0–1	19,989	
25 November 2000	Crewe Alexandra	A	0–1	7,103	
2 December 2000	Queens Park Rangers	H	5–2	21,782	Sibon (3), Morrison, Ekoku
9 December 2000	Stockport County	H	2–4	16,337	Morrison, Ekoku
16 December 2000	Sheffield United	A	1–1	25,156	Hendon
23 December 2000	Wolverhampton Wanderers	H	0–1	17,787	
26 December 2000	Bolton Wanderers	A	0–2	21,316	
30 December 2000	Huddersfield Town	A	0–0	18,931	
1 January 2001	Grimsby Town	H	1–0	17,004	Sibon
13 January 2001	Blackburn Rovers	A	0–2	19,308	
20 January 2001	Bolton Wanderers	H	0–3	17,638	
3 February 2001	Watford	H	2–3	16,134	Sibon, Ekoku
10 February 2001	Wimbledon	A	1–4	6,741	Ekoku
13 February 2001	Tranmere Rovers	H	1–0	15,444	Ekoku
21 February 2001	Nottingham Forest	A	1–0	23,266	Sibon
24 February 2001	Preston North End	A	0–2	14,379	
3 March 2001	Gillingham	H	2–1	18,702	Ekoku, Di Piedi
7 March 2001	Portsmouth	H	0–0	20,503	
10 March 2001	West Bromwich Albion	A	2–1	18,662	Soltvedt, Booth
17 March 2001	Burnley	H	2–0	20,184	Hendon, Sibon (pen)
24 March 2001	Birmingham City	A	2–1	19,733	De Bilde, Di Piedi
1 April 2001	Sheffield United	H	1–2	38,433	Sibon
7 April 2001	Stockport County	A	1–2	9,666	De Bilde
14 April 2001	Crystal Palace	H	4–1	19,877	Ekoku, De Bilde, Sibon, Ripley
16 April 2001	Fulham	A	1–1	17,500	Sibon
21 April 2001	Barnsley	H	2–1	23,498	Sibon, Donnelly
28 April 2001	Norwich City	A	0–1	21,241	
6 May 2001	Crewe Alexandra	H	0–0	28,007	

=== FA Cup ===
Round	Date	Opponent	Venue	Result	Attendance	Goalscorers
R3	6 January 2001	Norwich City	H	2–1	15,971	Hamshaw, Sibon
R4	27 January 2001	Southampton	A	1–3	15,251	Booth

=== League Cup ===
Round	Date	Opponent	Venue	Result	Attendance	Goalscorers
R2 1st Leg	19 September 2000	Oldham Athletic	A	3–1	3,213	Morrison, De Bilde, Westwood
R2 2nd Leg	27 September 2000	Oldham Athletic	H	5–1	4,773	Hamshaw, Westwood, Di Piedi, Sibon, Quinn
R3	1 November 2000	Sheffield United	H	2–1	32,283	Ekoku (2)
R4	29 November 2000	West Ham United	A	2–1	20,853	Morrison, Westwood
QF	12 December 2000	Birmingham City	A	0–2	22,911	

== Squad list ==
Note: Flags indicate national team as defined under FIFA eligibility rules; some limited exceptions apply. Players may hold more than one non-FIFA nationality.

No.	Pos.	Nation	Player
1	GK	ENG	Kevin Pressman
2	DF	ENG	Steve Haslam
3	DF	ENG	Andy Hinchcliffe
4	MF	NED	Wim Jonk
5	DF	ENG	Steve Harkness
6	DF	ENG	Des Walker
7	MF	IRL	Alan Quinn
8	FW	NED	Gerald Sibon
9	MF	ENG	Stuart Ripley (on loan from Southampton)
10	FW	BEL	Gilles De Bilde
11	MF	SCO	Phil O'Donnell
12	DF	ENG	Ian Hendon
14	MF	ENG	Aaron Lescott
15	MF	SCO	Philip Scott
16	MF	ENG	Matt Hamshaw
17	FW	ITA	Michele Di Piedi

No.	Pos.	Nation	Player
18	MF	SCO	Simon Donnelly
19	FW	ENG	Adam Muller
20	FW	NOR	Trond Egil Soltvedt
21	DF	ENG	Ashley Westwood
22	FW	NGR	Efan Ekoku (on loan from Grasshoppers)
23	MF	ENG	Carlton Palmer (on loan from Coventry City)
26	DF	ENG	Leigh Bromby
29	GK	ENG	Chris Stringer
30	DF	IRL	Derek Geary
31	DF	ENG	John Hutton
32	FW	IRL	Owen Morrison
33	DF	ENG	Craig Rand
35	MF	ENG	Peter Holmes
36	MF	ENG	Tony Crane
37	DF	ENG	Tom Staniforth

=== Left club during season ===
Note: Flags indicate national team as defined under FIFA eligibility rules; some limited exceptions apply. Players may hold more than one non-FIFA nationality.

No.	Pos.	Nation	Player
5	DF	ENG	Simon Grayson (on loan from Blackburn Rovers)
9	FW	ENG	Andy Booth (to Huddersfield Town)
12	FW	ENG	Richard Cresswell (to Leicester City)
13	GK	ENG	Paul Musselwhite (to Hull City)
13	GK	ENG	Marlon Beresford (on loan from Middlesbrough)
13	GK	ENG	Martin Hodge (retired)
14	MF	NOR	Petter Rudi (to Molde)
20	FW	ENG	Ritchie Humphreys (to Cambridge United)

No.	Pos.	Nation	Player
22	DF	ENG	Robbie Stockdale (on loan from Middlesbrough)
23	MF	ENG	Terry Cooke (on loan from Manchester City)
24	MF	NIR	Mark McKeever (to Bristol Rovers)
25	MF	ENG	David Billington (retired)
27	DF	AUS	Con Blatsis (on loan from Derby County)
28	MF	SWE	Jesper Johansson (to Djurgården)
34	MF	ENG	Alex Higgins (to QPR)
38	DF	ENG	Kevin Nicholson (to Northampton Town)

=== Reserve squad ===
Note: Flags indicate national team as defined under FIFA eligibility rules; some limited exceptions apply. Players may hold more than one non-FIFA nationality.

No. / Pos. / Nation / Player; — / DF / ENG / Greg Young	No. / Pos. / Nation / Player; — / FW / ENG / Dene Cropper
