= David Billington =

David Billington may refer to:

- David P. Billington (1927-2018), an American structural engineer and educator
- David Billington (cricketer) (born 1965), English cricketer
- David Billington (footballer) (born 1980), English footballer
