= McClymont =

McClymont is a surname. Notable people with the surname include:

- Brooke McClymont (born 1981), Australian singer-songwriter
- Gregg McClymont (born 1976), Scottish politician
- Gordon McClymont (1920-2000), Australian agricultural scientist
- Kate McClymont (born 1958), Australian journalist
- Samantha McClymont (born 1986), Australian singer-songwriter
- Thomas McClymont, New Zealand rugby league player
- Willie McClymont (born 1953), Scottish footballer
