= 1972–73 Motherwell F.C. season =

Scottish football club season

The 1972–73 season was Motherwell's 4th consecutive season in the top division of Scottish football after being promoted from the Scottish Second Division in 1969.

== Results ==
All results are written with Motherwell's score first.

=== Scottish League Division One ===
Date	Opponent	Venue	Result	Scorers
2 September 1972	Dundee	H	2–2	Lawson, Forsyth
9 September 1972	Airdrieonians	A	2–1	Lawson, McClymont
16 September 1972	Kilmarnock	H	2–0	McClymont, Wark
23 September 1972	St Johnstone	A	2–2	Murray, McClymont
30 September 1972	Aberdeen	A	2–7	McClymont, Gray
7 October 1972	Dundee United	H	1–4	Lawson
14 October 1972	Rangers	H	0–2	
21 October 1972	Heart of Midlothian	A	0–0	
28 October 1972	Falkirk	H	1–1	Campbell
4 November 1972	Ayr United	A	2–3	Watson, McClymont
11 November 1972	Celtic	H	0–5	
18 November 1972	Partick Thistle	A	3–0	McCabe, McClymont, Campbell
25 November 1972	East Fife	H	0–1	
2 December 1972	Greenock Morton	A	0–1	
16 December 1972	Dumbarton	A	0–0	
23 December 1972	Arbroath	H	2–0	Heron, Muir
30 December 1972	Dundee	A	0–2	
1 January 1973	Airdrieonians	H	2–0	Fraser o.g, Martin
6 January 1973	Kilmarnock	A	0–1	
13 January 1973	St Johnstone	H	1–1	Goldthorp
27 January 1973	Dundee United	A	2–1	Lawson, McCabe
7 February 1973	Aberdeen	H	2–0	Lawson, Campbell
10 February 1973	Rangers	A	1–2	Millar
19 February 1973	Heart of Midlothian	H	2–2	Millar, Campbell
3 March 1973	Falkirk	A	1–0	Whiteford
10 March 1973	Ayr United	H	1–2	Millar
24 March 1973	Partick Thistle	H	0–0	
31 March 1973	East Fife	A	1–3	Millar
3 April 1973	Celtic	A	0–2	
7 April 1973	Greenock Morton	H	3–0	McCabe, Goldthorp, Shevlane o.g.
10 April 1973	Hibernian	H	1–1	Goldthorp
14 April 1973	Hibernian	A	1–0	Millar
21 April 1973	Dumbarton	H	0–2	
28 April 1973	Arbroath	A	1–0	Muir

=== Scottish Cup ===
Date	Round	Opponent	Venue	Result	Scorers
3 February 1973	R3	Raith Rovers	H	2–1	
24 February 1973	R4	Celtic	H	0–4	

=== Scottish League Cup ===
Date	Round	Opponent	Venue	Result	Scorers
12 August 1972	GS	Clyde	A	2–2	
16 August 1972	GS	East Stirlingshire	H	1–0	
19 August 1972	GS	Dundee	H	1–3	
23 August 1972	GS	East Stirlingshire	A	5–1	
26 August 1972	GS	Clyde	H	1–1	
30 August 1972	GS	Dundee	A	1–3	
4 September 1972	R1 L1	Albion Rovers	H	4–1	
6 September 1972	R1 L2	Albion Rovers	A	4–0	
20 September 1972	R2 L1	Airdrieonians	H	0–1	
4 October 1972	R2 L2	Airdrieonians	A	1–1	

=== Texaco Cup ===
Date	Round	Opponent	Venue	Result	Scorers
12 September 1972	R1 L1	Coventry City	A	3–3	
27 September 1972	R1 L2	Coventry City	H	1–0	
16 October 1972	QF L1	Heart of Midlothian	H	0–0	
8 November 1972	QF L2	Heart of Midlothian	A	4–2	
14 March 1973	SF L1	Norwich City	A	0–2	
21 March 1973	SF L2	Norwich City	H	2–3	

== League table ==
Pos	Team	Pld	W	D	L	GF	GA	GD	Pts
6	Ayr United	34	16	8	10	50	51	−1	40
7	Dundee United	34	17	5	12	56	51	+5	39
8	Motherwell	34	11	9	14	38	48	−10	31
9	East Fife	34	11	8	15	46	54	−8	30
10	Heart of Midlothian	34	12	6	16	39	50	−11	30

Source: Soccerbase and League Tables

== See also ==
- List of Motherwell F.C. seasons
