= 1993–94 Football League Cup =

League Cup, The Coca-Cola Cup
- The Coca-Cola Cup

Tournament details
- Country: England; Wales
- Teams: 92

Final positions
- Champions: Aston Villa (4th title)
- Runners-up: Manchester United

Tournament statistics
- Top goal scorer(s): John Aldridge (7 goals)

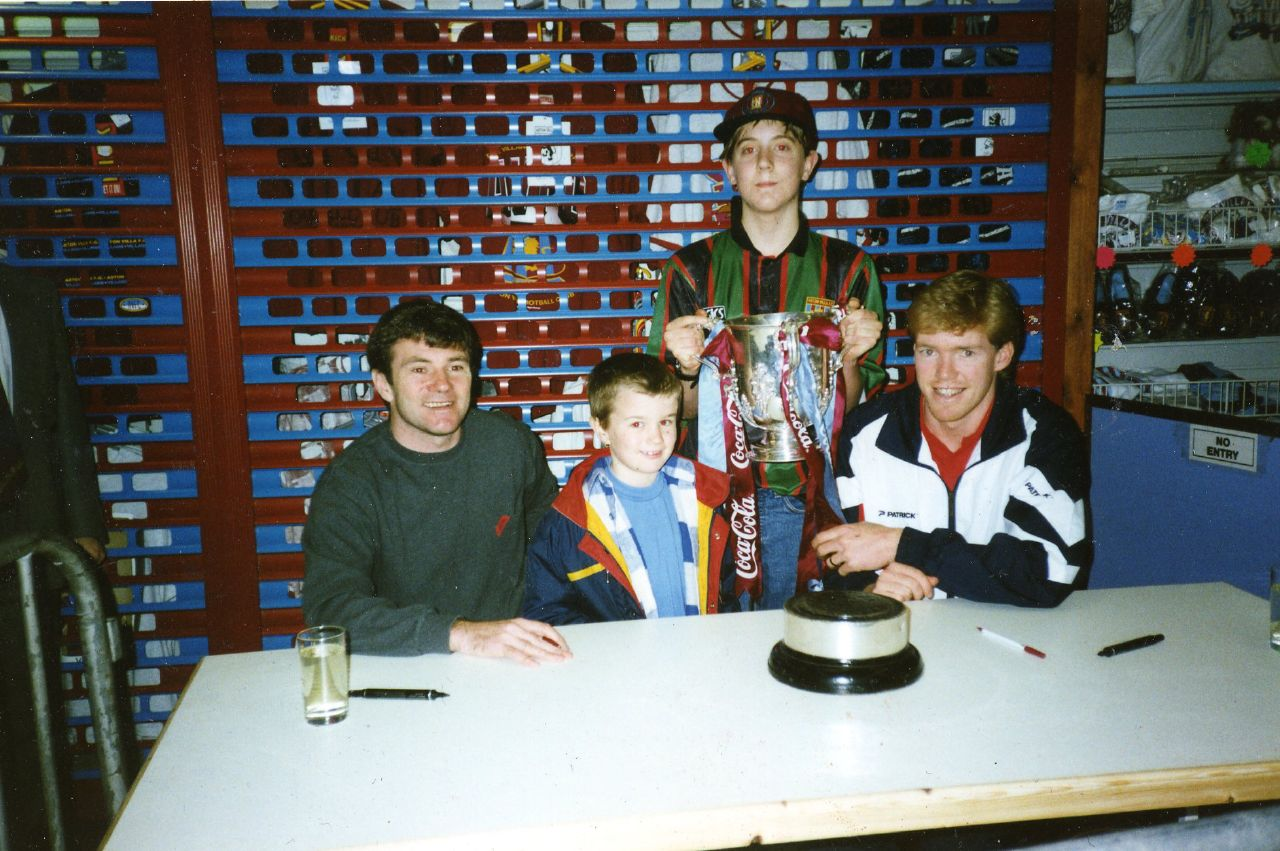
Ray Houghton (far left) and Steve Staunton (far right) of Aston Villa pose with fans and the League Cup trophy in 1994.

The 1993–94 Football League Cup (known as the Coca-Cola Cup for sponsorship reasons) was the 34th Football League Cup, a knockout competition for England's top 92 football clubs.

Aston Villa won the competition, beating Manchester United 3–1 in the final. As they would later win the Premier League and the FA Cup, this loss prevented them to be the first English side to win a domestic treble, something ultimately achieved by their cross-city rivals Manchester City in the 2018–19 season.

== First round ==
A total of 56 of the First, Second and Third Division clubs compete from the First Round. 22 teams from the Third Division, 24 teams from the Second Division, and 10 teams from the First Division (the 7 teams that placed 15th-21st in Division One from the previous season plus the 3 promoted sides from Division Two from the previous season). Each section is divided equally into a pot of seeded clubs and a pot of unseeded clubs. Clubs' rankings depend upon their finishing position in the 1992–93 season.

=== First leg ===
Home team	Score	Away team	Date
Birmingham City	3–0	Plymouth Argyle	17-08-1993
Bolton Wanderers	0–2	Bury	17-08-1993
Bournemouth	3–1	Cardiff City	17-08-1993
Brentford	2–2	Watford	17-08-1993
Bristol Rovers	1–4	West Bromwich Albion	18-08-1993
Cambridge United	1–0	Luton Town	17-08-1993
Chesterfield	3–1	Carlisle United	17-08-1993
Crewe Alexandra	0–1	Wrexham	17-08-1993
Darlington	1–5	Bradford City	17-08-1993
Doncaster Rovers	0–1	Blackpool	16-08-1993
Fulham	2–1	Colchester United	17-08-1993
Gillingham	1–0	Brighton & Hove Albion	17-08-1993
Hereford United	0–2	Torquay United	17-08-1993
Huddersfield Town	0–0	Scarborough	17-08-1993
Leyton Orient	0–2	Wycombe Wanderers	17-08-1993
Notts County	2–0	Hull City	17-08-1993
Port Vale	2–2	Lincoln City	17-08-1993
Preston North End	1–2	Burnley	17-08-1993
Reading	3–0	Northampton Town	18-08-1993
Rochdale	2–0	York City	17-08-1993
Shrewsbury Town	1–0	Scunthorpe United	17-08-1993
Southend United	0–2	Barnet	18-08-1993
Stockport County	1–1	Hartlepool United	17-08-1993
Stoke City	2–2	Mansfield Town	18-08-1993
Sunderland	3–1	Chester City	17-08-1993
Swansea City	0–1	Bristol City	17-08-1993
Walsall	0–0	Exeter City	17-08-1993
Wigan Athletic	0–1	Rotherham United	17-08-1993

=== Second leg ===
Home team	Score	Away team	Date	Agg
Barnet	1–1	Southend United	24-08-1993	3–1
Blackpool	3–3	Doncaster Rovers	24-08-1993	4–3
Bradford City	6–0	Darlington	25-08-1993	11–1
Brighton & Hove Albion	2–0	Gillingham	25-08-1993	2–1
Bristol City	0–2	Swansea City	24-08-1993	1–2
Burnley	4–1	Preston North End	25-08-1993	6–2
Bury	0–2	Bolton Wanderers	24-08-1993	2–2
Cardiff City	1–1	Bournemouth	24-08-1993	2–4
Carlisle United	1–1	Chesterfield	24-08-1993	2–4
Chester City	0–0	Sunderland	24-08-1993	1–3
Colchester United	1–2	Fulham	24-08-1993	2–4
Exeter City	2–1	Walsall	25-08-1993	2–1
Hartlepool United	2–1	Stockport County	24-08-1993	3–2
Hull City	3–1	Notts County	24-08-1993	3–3
Lincoln City	0–0	Port Vale	24-08-1993	2–2
Luton Town	0–1	Cambridge United	24-08-1993	0–2
Mansfield Town	1–3	Stoke City	24-08-1993	3–5
Northampton Town	0–2	Reading	07-09-1993	0–5
Plymouth Argyle	2–0	Birmingham City	24-08-1993	2–3
Rotherham United	4–2	Wigan Athletic	24-08-1993	5–2
Scarborough	0–3	Huddersfield Town	24-08-1993	0–3
Scunthorpe United	1–1	Shrewsbury Town	24-08-1993	1–2
Torquay United	0–2	Hereford United	24-08-1993	2–2
Watford	3–1	Brentford	24-08-1993	5–3
West Bromwich Albion	0–0	Bristol Rovers	25-08-1993	4–1
Wrexham	3–3	Crewe Alexandra	24-08-1993	4–3
Wycombe Wanderers	1–0	Leyton Orient	24-08-1993	3–0
York City	0–0	Rochdale	24-08-1993	0–2

== Second round ==
A further 36 teams entered in the second round, joining the 28 qualifiers from the first round. The 36 teams were made up from the 22 current Premier League teams, plus the remaining 14 teams from Division One. First leg matches were played on 21 and 22 September, with the second leg matches being played on 5 and 6 October.

=== First leg ===
Home team	Score	Away team	Date
Barnet	1–2	Queens Park Rangers	21-09-1993
Barnsley	1–1	Peterborough United	21-09-1993
Birmingham City	0–1	Aston Villa	21-09-1993
Blackburn Rovers	1–0	Bournemouth	21-09-1993
Blackpool	3–0	Sheffield United	21-09-1993
Bolton Wanderers	1–1	Sheffield Wednesday	21-09-1993
Bradford City	2–1	Norwich City	22-09-1993
Burnley	0–0	Tottenham Hotspur	22-09-1993
Coventry City	3–0	Wycombe Wanderers	22-09-1993
Crystal Palace	3–1	Charlton Athletic	21-09-1993
Exeter City	1–3	Derby County	22-09-1993
Fulham	1–3	Liverpool	21-09-1993
Grimsby Town	3–0	Hartlepool United	21-09-1993
Hereford United	0–1	Wimbledon	22-09-1993
Huddersfield Town	0–5	Arsenal	21-09-1993
Ipswich Town	2–1	Cambridge United	21-09-1993
Lincoln City	3–4	Everton	21-09-1993
Manchester City	1–1	Reading	22-09-1993
Middlesbrough	5–0	Brighton & Hove Albion	21-09-1993
Newcastle United	4–1	Notts County	22-09-1993
Rochdale	1–6	Leicester City	21-09-1993
Rotherham United	0–0	Portsmouth	21-09-1993
Southampton	1–0	Shrewsbury Town	22-09-1993
Stoke City	2–1	Manchester United	22-09-1993
Sunderland	2–1	Leeds United	21-09-1993
Swansea City	2–1	Oldham Athletic	21-09-1993
Swindon Town	2–0	Wolverhampton Wanderers	22-09-1993
Tranmere Rovers	5–1	Oxford United	21-09-1993
Watford	0–0	Millwall	21-09-1993
West Bromwich Albion	1–1	Chelsea	22-09-1993
West Ham United	5–1	Chesterfield	22-09-1993
Wrexham	3–3	Nottingham Forest	21-09-1993

=== Second leg ===
Home team	Score	Away team	Date	Agg
Arsenal	1–1	Huddersfield Town	05-10-1993	6–1
Aston Villa	1–0	Birmingham City	06-10-1993	2–0
Bournemouth	0–0	Blackburn Rovers	05-10-1993	0–1
Brighton & Hove Albion	1–3	Middlesbrough	06-10-1993	1–8
Cambridge United	0–2	Ipswich Town	05-10-1993	1–4
Charlton Athletic	0–1	Crystal Palace	05-10-1993	1–4
Chelsea	2–1	West Bromwich Albion	06-10-1993	3–2
Chesterfield	0–2	West Ham United	05-10-1993	1–7
Derby County	2–0	Exeter City	06-10-1993	5–1
Everton	4–2	Lincoln City	06-10-1993	8–5
Hartlepool United	0–2	Grimsby Town	05-10-1993	0–5
Leeds United	1–2	Sunderland	06-10-1993	2–4
Leicester City	2–1	Rochdale	06-10-1993	8–2
Liverpool	5–0	Fulham	05-10-1993	8–1
Manchester United	2–0	Stoke City	06-10-1993	3–2
Millwall	4–3	Watford	06-10-1993	4–3
Norwich City	3–0	Bradford City	06-10-1993	4–2
Nottingham Forest	3–1	Wrexham	06-10-1993	6–4
Notts County	1–7	Newcastle United	05-10-1993	2–11
Oldham Athletic	2–0	Swansea City	06-10-1993	3–2
Oxford United	1–1	Tranmere Rovers	05-10-1993	2–6
Peterborough United	3–1	Barnsley	05-10-1993	4–2
Portsmouth	5–0	Rotherham United	05-10-1993	5–0
Queens Park Rangers	4–0	Barnet	06-10-1993	6–1
Reading	1–2	Manchester City	06-10-1993	2–3
Sheffield United	2–0	Blackpool	05-10-1993	2–3
Sheffield Wednesday	1–0	Bolton Wanderers	06-10-1993	2–1
Shrewsbury Town	2–0	Southampton	06-10-1993	2–1
Tottenham Hotspur	3–1	Burnley	06-10-1993	3–1
Wimbledon	4–1	Hereford United	05-10-1993	5–1
Wolverhampton Wanderers	2–1	Swindon Town	05-10-1993	2–3
Wycombe Wanderers	4–2	Coventry City	05-10-1993	4–5

== Third round ==
Most matches in the third round were played on 26 and 27 October with 5 replays being played between 9 November and 10 November.

=== Ties ===
Home team	Score	Away team	Date
Arsenal	1–1	Norwich City	26-10-1993
Blackburn Rovers	0–0	Shrewsbury Town	26-10-1993
Blackpool	2–2	Peterborough United	26-10-1993
Derby County	0–1	Tottenham Hotspur	27-10-1993
Everton	2–2	Crystal Palace	26-10-1993
Liverpool	3–2	Ipswich Town	27-10-1993
Manchester City	1–0	Chelsea	26-10-1993
Manchester United	5–1	Leicester City	27-10-1993
Middlesbrough	1–1	Sheffield Wednesday	27-10-1993
Nottingham Forest	2–1	West Ham United	27-10-1993
Oldham Athletic	2–0	Coventry City	26-10-1993
Portsmouth	2–0	Swindon Town	26-10-1993
Queens Park Rangers	3–0	Millwall	27-10-1993
Sunderland	1–4	Aston Villa	26-10-1993
Tranmere Rovers	4–1	Grimsby Town	26-10-1993
Wimbledon	2–1	Newcastle United	27-10-1993

=== Replays ===
Home team	Score	Away team	Date
Norwich City	0–3	Arsenal	10-11-1993
Shrewsbury Town	3–4	Blackburn Rovers	09-11-1993
Peterborough United	2–1	Blackpool	09-11-1993
Crystal Palace	1–4	Everton	10-11-1993
Sheffield Wednesday	2–1	Middlesbrough	10-11-1993

== Fourth round ==
All fourth round matches were played between 30 November and 1 December with three replays being played between 14 and 15 December.

=== Ties ===
Home team	Score	Away team	Date
Arsenal	0–1	Aston Villa	30-11-1993
Everton	0–2	Manchester United	30-11-1993
Liverpool	1–1	Wimbledon	01-12-1993
Nottingham Forest	0–0	Manchester City	01-12-1993
Peterborough United	0–0	Portsmouth	30-11-1993
Queens Park Rangers	1–2	Sheffield Wednesday	01-12-1993
Tottenham Hotspur	1–0	Blackburn Rovers	01-12-1993
Tranmere Rovers	3–0	Oldham Athletic	30-11-1993

=== Replays ===
Home team	Score	Away team	Date
Wimbledon	2–2	Liverpool	14-12-1993
Manchester City	1–2	Nottingham Forest	15-12-1993
Portsmouth	1–0	Peterborough United	15-12-1993

== Fifth round ==
The three of the four quarter final matches were played between 11 and 12 January with one quarter final match being played on 26 January. Two replays were played on 26 January and 29 January respectively.

=== Ties ===
Home team	Score	Away team	Date
Manchester United	2–2	Portsmouth	12-01-1994
Nottingham Forest	1–1	Tranmere Rovers	26-01-1994
Tottenham Hotspur	1–2	Aston Villa	12-01-1994
Wimbledon	1–2	Sheffield Wednesday	11-01-1994

=== Replays ===
Home team	Score	Away team	Date
Portsmouth	0–1	Manchester United	26-01-1994
Tranmere Rovers	2–0	Nottingham Forest	29-01-1994

== Semi-finals ==
The semi-final draw was made after the conclusion of the quarter-finals. Unlike the other rounds, the semi-final ties were played over two legs, with each team playing one leg at home and one away. Manchester United's quest for a unique domestic treble continued as they defeated Sheffield Wednesday 1–0 in the first leg at Old Trafford before a fine 4–1 win at Hillsborough in the second. Tranmere Rovers boosted their hopes of a first ever major trophy by defeating Aston Villa 3–1 in the first leg of the other semi-final, but they then found themselves on the receiving end of a 3-1 Villa win and lost the shootout, meaning that Villa went through, though they were up against a Manchester United side who had topped the league virtually all season and were also chasing the FA Cup.

=== First leg ===
13 February 1994

Manchester United	1–0	Sheffield Wednesday
Giggs 20'	Report

Old Trafford, Manchester
Attendance: 43,294
Referee: Keith Burge, Tonypandy

16 February 1994

Tranmere Rovers	3–1	Aston Villa
Nolan 5'; Hughes 45' Aldridge 78'		Atkinson 90'

Prenton Park, Tranmere
Attendance: 17,140
Referee: Roger Milford, Bristol

=== Second leg ===
27 February 1994

Aston Villa	3–1 (a.e.t.)	Tranmere Rovers
Saunders 19'; Teale 23'; Atkinson 87'	Report	Aldridge 29'
Penalties
Saunders (penalty scored); Teale (penalty scored); Fenton (penalty scored); Atkinson (penalty scored); Ehiogu (penalty missed); Richardson (penalty missed); Daley (penalty scored)	5–4	(penalty scored) Irons; (penalty scored) Thomas; (penalty missed) Brannan; (penalty scored) Higgins; (penalty scored) Aldridge; (penalty missed) O'Brien; (penalty missed) Nolan

Villa Park, Birmingham
Attendance: 40,593
Referee: Allan Gunn, Sussex

4–4 on aggregate. Aston Villa won on a penalty shoot-out.

2 March 1994

Sheffield Wednesday	1–4	Manchester United
Hirst 34'	Report	McClair 4'; Kanchelskis 11'; Hughes 39', 82'

Hillsborough, Sheffield
Attendance: 34,878
Referee: David Elleray, Harrow

Manchester United won 5–1 on aggregate.

== Final ==
The 1994 League Cup final was played on 27 March 1994 and was contested between Aston Villa and Manchester United at Wembley Stadium. Aston Villa won 3–1 and denied United a domestic treble, as they later won the 1993–94 FA Premier League and 1993–94 FA Cup.

27 March 1994
17:00

Aston Villa	3–1	Manchester United
Atkinson 25'; Saunders 75', 90' (pen.)		Hughes 82'

Wembley Stadium, London
Attendance: 77,231
Referee: Keith Cooper (Pontypridd)
