= Chris Stringer (footballer) =

English footballer

Personal information
- Full name: Christopher Stringer
- Date of birth: 2 June 1983 (age 43)
- Place of birth: Grimsby, England
- Height: 1.98 m (6 ft 6 in)
- Position: Goalkeeper

Senior career*
Years	Team	Apps	(Gls)
2000–2004	Sheffield Wednesday	9	(0)
- * Club domestic league appearances and goals as of 7 January 2008

Christopher Stringer (born 2 June 1983) is an English former professional footballer who played for Sheffield Wednesday as a goalkeeper. He made his senior debut for the club at the age of seventeen in 2000 and made twelve appearances in all competitions before being forced to retire from football at the age of 20.

== Career ==
Born in Grimsby, Stringer began his career in the youth system at Sheffield Wednesday after joining the club at the age of eleven. He made his senior debut against Wolverhampton Wanderers on 13 August 2000, the opening day of the 2000–01 season, as a substitute at the age of seventeen after starting goalkeeper Kevin Pressman was sent off after just 13 seconds. The sending off was the fastest red card in English football history, beating the previous record by six seconds. He conceded once during the remainder of the match as it ended in a 1–1 draw. Wednesday signed Paul Musselwhite to cover for the suspended Pressman but he was ineligible for their following match against Blackburn Rovers as he was not registered to play in time, handing Stringer his first senior start. He made five further appearances during the season and was handed a contract extension with manager Paul Jewell describing him as "enthusiastic, and has never let us down".

He made five appearances over the following three seasons as persistent injuries restricted his playing time. Stringer was one of thirteen players released by Wednesday in May 2004 as manager Chris Turner looked to reduce the club's wage bill. At the age of 20, after struggling with injuries and having not played a competitive match for over a year, he announced his retirement from professional football. Operations on his calf muscles had resulted in him developing blood clots and doctors had advised him against further attempts at playing. He stated, "I would carry on playing [...] but my health is more important and I have to get on with my life."

== Career statistics ==
Appearances and goals by club, season and competition
Club	Season	League			FA Cup		League Cup		Other		Total	
Club	Season	Division	Apps	Goals	Apps	Goals	Apps	Goals	Apps	Goals	Apps	Goals
Sheffield Wednesday	2000–01	First Division	5	0	1	0	1	0	0	0	7	0
Sheffield Wednesday	2001–02	First Division	1	0	0	0	0	0	0	0	1	0
Sheffield Wednesday	2002–03	First Division	3	0	1	0	0	0	0	0	4	0
Sheffield Wednesday	2003–04	First Division	0	0	0	0	0	0	0	0	0	0
Career total			9	0	2	0	1	0	0	0	12	0
