= Francesco Sanetti =

Italian footballer (born 1979)

Personal information
- Date of birth: 11 January 1979 (age 47)
- Place of birth: Rome, Italy
- Height: 1.86 m (6 ft 1 in)
- Position: Forward

Senior career*
| Years | Team | Apps | (Gls) |
| 1996–1997 | Ferentino | 28 | (10) |
| 1997–1998 | Genoa | 0 | (0) |
| 1998–1999 | Sheffield Wednesday | 5 | (1) |
| 1999–2000 | Livorno | 1 | (0) |
| 2000 | → Giorgione (loan) | 8 | (0) |
| 2000–2003 | Cisco Roma | 81 | (20) |
| 2003–2004 | Teramo | 12 | (2) |
| 2004–2005 | Acireale | 23 | (2) |
| 2005–2006 | Cavese | 9 | (0) |
| 2006–2007 | L'Aquila | 12 | (7) |
| 2006 | → Aprilia (loan) | 17 | (2) |
| 2007–2009 | Latina | 41 | (30) |
| 2008 | → Albalonga (loan) | 18 | (8) |
| 2009–2010 | San Cesareo | 32 | (20) |
| 2010– | Colleferro | 28 | (17) |
- * Club domestic league appearances and goals

Francesco Sanetti (born 11 January 1979) is an Italian former professional footballer who last played for Colleferro Calcio as a forward.

== Career ==
Sanetti was born in Rome.

Sheffield Wednesday signed Sanetti on a free transfer from Genoa on 30 April 1998. He made his debut as a substitute and scored a late consolation goal against Aston Villa in a 3–1 defeat on 2 May 1998.

He was rewarded for his debut performance with a starting role in the next game against Crystal Palace, but left the club in July in the following year having just made a single start in five appearances, scoring one goal in the process.
