= 1984–85 Motherwell F.C. season =

Scottish football club season

Motherwell
1984–85 season
- Manager: Tommy McLean
- Stadium: Fir Park
- Scottish First Division: 1st
- Scottish Cup: Semi-final
- Scottish League Cup: Second round
- Top goalscorer: League: All: Andy Harrow and Rab Stewart (9)
- Highest home attendance: 3,878 vs Hamilton Academical, First Division, 2 January 1985
- Lowest home attendance: 1,357 vs East Fife, First Divison, 27 October 1984

During the 1984–85 season, Motherwell competed in the Scottish First Division after two seasons in the Scottish Premier Division. The club under manager Tommy McLean in his first season as manager won the title and promoted straight back to the Premier. This is, as of 2026, the last time Motherwell played in the 2nd tier of Scottish football.

== Scottish First Division ==
=== League table ===
Pos	Team	Pld	W	D	L	GF	GA	GD	Pts	Promotion or relegation
1	Motherwell (C, P)	39	21	8	10	62	26	+36	50	Promotion to the Premier Division
2	Clydebank (P)	39	17	14	8	57	37	+20	48	Promotion to the Premier Division
3	Falkirk	39	19	7	13	65	54	+11	45	
4	Hamilton Academical	39	16	11	12	48	49	−1	43	
5	Airdrieonians	39	17	8	14	70	59	+11	42	

Source: RSSSF and statto
Rules for classification: 1) points; 2) goal difference; 3) number of goals scored.
(C) Champions; (P) Promoted

=== Matches ===
Win	Draw	Loss

Scottish First Division results
Date	Opponent	Venue	Result F–A	Scorers	Attendance
11 August 1984	Kilmarnock	H	2–0		2,384
18 August 1984	Hamilton Academical	A	0–2		2,650
25 August 1984	Partick Thistle	H	2–1		2,579
1 September 1984	Forfar Athletic	A	2–1		1,383
8 September 1984	Ayr United	H	1–1		2,427
15 September 1984	Falkirk	A	3–0		2,409
22 September 1984	Clydebank	H	0–1		2,407
29 September 1984	Meadowbank Thistle	H	3–1		2,053
6 October 1984	Airdireonians	A	0–2		3,786
13 October 1984	Brechin City	H	2–0		1,715
20 October 1984	Clyde	A	3–3		1,143
27 October 1984	East Fife	A	2–1		1,357
3 November 1984	St Johnstone	H	0–2		1,743
10 November 1984	Ayr United	A	3–1		2,069
17 November 1984	Falkirk	H	2–3		2,013
24 November 1984	Clydebank	A	1–2		1,245
1 December 1984	Meadowbank Thistle	A	2–4		756
8 December 1984	Airdireonians	H	1–1		2,838
15 December 1984	Forfar Athletic	H	2–0		1,591
22 December 1984	Partick Thistle	A	1–2		2,157
29 December 1984	Kilmarnock	A	0–0		2,042
2 January 1985	Hamilton Academical	H	3–0		3,878
5 January 1985	Clyde	H	0–0		2,729
19 January 1985	East Fife	A	2–1		1,672
2 February 1985	St Johnstone	A	1–0		1,657
9 February 1985	Falkirk	A	2–0		2,805
23 February 1985	Kilmarnock	H	2–2		2,288
26 February 1985	Brechin City	A	2–0		798
2 March 1985	Ayr United	A	2–1		1,831
16 March 1985	Clydebank	H	1–0		3,161
20 March 1985	Airdireonians	H	2–0		4,483
23 March 1985	Clyde	A	0–1		1,447
3 April 1985	Meadowbank Thistle	H	0–1		2,070
6 April 1985	East Fife	H	5–0		1,930
20 April 1985	Partick Thistle	A	1–0		3,270
24 April 1985	St Johnstone	H	4–0		2,376
27 April 1985	Hamilton Academical	A	1–1		2,926
4 May 1985	Brechin City	H	2–1		3,007
11 May 1985	Forfar Athletic	A	0–0		1,430

== Scottish Cup ==
Win	Draw	Loss

Scottish Cup results
Round	Date	Opponent	Venue	Result F–A	Scorers	Attendance
Third round	30 January 1985	Dumbarton	H	4–0		2,852
Fourth round	20 February 1985	Meadowbank Thistle	A	2–0		3,000
Fifth round	9 March 1985	Forfar Athletic	H	4–1		5,701
Semi Final	13 April 1985	Celtic	N	1–1		29,935
Semi Final Replay	17 April 1985	Celtic	N	1–3		25,876

== Scottish League Cup ==
Win	Draw	Loss

Scottish League Cup results
Round	Date	Opponent	Venue	Result F–A	Scorers	Attendance
Second round	22 August 1984	Ayr United	H	0–1		2,052
