= 1995–96 Motherwell F.C. season =

Motherwell
1994–95 season
- Manager: Alex McLeish
- Stadium: Fir Park
- Scottish Premier Division: 8th
- Scottish Cup: Third round
- Scottish League Cup: Quarter-final
- UEFA Cup: Preliminary round

During the 1995–96 season, Motherwell competed in the Scottish Premier Division, in which they finished 8th.

== Scottish Premier Division ==
=== League table ===
Pos	Team	Pld	W	D	L	GF	GA	GD	Pts	Qualification or relegation
6	Raith Rovers	36	12	7	17	41	57	−16	43	
7	Kilmarnock	36	11	8	17	39	54	−15	41	
8	Motherwell	36	9	12	15	28	39	−11	39	
9	Partick Thistle (R)	36	8	6	22	29	62	−33	30	Qualification for the Play-off
10	Falkirk (R)	36	6	6	24	31	60	−29	24	Relegation to the First Division

Source: Soccerbase
Rules for classification: 1) Points; 2) Goal difference; 3) Goals scored
(R) Relegated

=== Matches ===
Win	Draw	Loss

Scottish Premier Division results
Date	Opponent	Venue	Result F–A	Scorers	Attendance
26 August 1995	Heart of Midlothian	A	1–1	Arnott	10,791
9 September 1995	Partick Thistle	H	1–1	Walker (o.g.)	6,155
16 September 1995	Celtic	A	1–1	Arnott	31,365
23 September 1995	Falkirk	A	0–0		4,246
30 September 1995	Kilmarnock	H	3–0	Coyne (2, 1 pen.), May	6,356
3 October 1995	Rangers	A	1–2	McSkimming	39,891
7 October 1995	Raith Rovers	H	0–2		5,727
14 October 1995	Aberdeen	H	2–1	Coyne, Lambert	6,842
21 October 1995	Hibernian	A	2–4	Hendry (2)	9,803
28 October 1995	Partick Thistle	A	0–1		4,029
4 November 1995	Celtic	H	0–2		12,077
7 November 1995	Heart of Midlothian	H	0–0		5,595
11 November 1995	Raith Rovers	A	0–0		4,293
18 November 1995	Kilmarnock	A	1–1	Burns	6,608
25 November 1995	Falkirk	H	1–1	Burns	5,201
2 December 1995	Hibernian	H	0–2		5,362
9 December 1995	Aberdeen	A	0–1		11,299
19 December 1995	Rangers	H	0–0		10,197
6 January 1996	Celtic	A	0–1		34,629
10 January 1996	Heart of Midlothian	A	0–4		9,288
13 January 1996	Partick Thistle	H	0–2		5,226
16 January 1996	Kilmarnock	H	0–1		5,781
20 January 1996	Hibernian	A	0–0		7,658
23 January 1996	Falkirk	A	1–0	McLaughlin (o.g.)	3,845
10 February 1996	Rangers	A	2–3	Martin, Falconer	44,871
13 February 1996	Aberdeen	H	1–0	Burns	5,090
24 February 1996	Raith Rovers	H	1–0	Falconer	5,569
2 March 1996	Falkirk	H	1–0	Falconer	5,037
16 March 1996	Kilmarnock	A	1–0	Lambert (pen.)	7,035
23 March 1996	Celtic	H	0–0		12,394
30 March 1996	Partick Thistle	A	2–0	Davies, van der Gaag	4,846
6 April 1996	Hibernian	H	3–0	Falconer, Martin, Coyne	5,964
13 April 1996	Aberdeen	A	1–2	Falconer	8,943
20 April 1996	Rangers	H	1–3	Arnott	13,128
27 April 1996	Raith Rovers	A	0–2		3,653
4 May 1996	Heart of Midlothian	H	1–1	Davies	8,301

== Scottish Cup ==
Win	Draw	Loss

Scottish Cup results
Round	Date	Opponent	Venue	Result F–A	Scorers	Attendance
Third round	30 January 1996	Aberdeen	H	0–2		6,035

== Scottish League Cup ==
Win	Draw	Loss

Scottish League Cup results
Round	Date	Opponent	Venue	Result F–A	Scorers	Attendance
Second round	19 August 1995	Clydebank	A	1–1 (a.e.t.) (4–1 p)	Arnott	2,192
Third round	29 August 1995	Dundee United	A	2–1	Lambert, Arnott	6,839
Quarter-final	20 September 1995	Aberdeen	H	1–2 (a.e.t.)	Arnott	9,137

== UEFA Cup ==
Win	Draw	Loss

UEFA Cup results
Round	Date	Opponent	Venue	Result F–A	Scorers	Attendance	Ref.
Preliminary round, first leg	8 August 1995	(Finland) MyPa	H	1–3	McSkimming	8,280	
Preliminary round, second leg	22 August 1995	(Finland) MyPa	A	2–0	Burns, Arnott	4,200	
