= David Billington (cricketer) =

English cricketer

Personal information
- Full name: David James Billington
- Born: 6 December 1965 (age 60); Leyland, Lancashire, England
- Batting: Right-handed

Domestic team information
- Years: Team
- 1985: Leicestershire

Career statistics
Competition	First-class
Matches	1
Runs scored	19
Batting average	19.00
100s/50s	–/–
Top score	19
Balls bowled	–
Wickets	–
Bowling average	–
5 wickets in innings	–
10 wickets in match	–
Best bowling	–
Catches/stumpings	1/–
- Source: Cricinfo, 3 March 2012

David James Billington (born 6 December 1965) is a former English cricketer. Billington was a right-handed batsman. He was born at Leyland, Lancashire.

Billington made a single first-class appearance for Leicestershire against Warwickshire at Leicester Road, Hinckley, in the 1985 County Championship. No play was possible on day one due to rain, with the match beginning on its second scheduled day, with Leicestershire winning the toss and electing to field first. Warwickshire declared their first-innings after just nine overs, at 16 without loss. Leicestershire's first-innings was just as brief, ending after ten overs, at 15 for the loss of one wicket. Both first-innings' were short in able to make up for the time lost in the match from there being no play on day one. With the match beginning properly in Warwickshire's second-innings, Leicestershire dismissed their opponents for 160, leaving them to chase 152 for victory. Billington, who came into bat at number three, made 19 runs in the chase, before being dismissed by Anton Ferreira. Leicestershire reached their target with four wickets to spare. This was his only major appearance for Leicestershire.
