= Bobby Howitt =

Scottish footballer

Personal information
- Full name: Robert Gibb Howitt
- Date of birth: 15 July 1925
- Place of birth: Glasgow, Scotland
- Date of death: 31 January 2005 (aged 79)
- Place of death: Carluke, Scotland
- Position: Inside forward

Senior career*
Years	Team	Apps	(Gls)
- Vale of Clyde
1948–1955	Partick Thistle	110	(35)
1955–1958	Sheffield United	89	(30)
1958–1963	Stoke City	133	(14)
Total		332	(79)

International career
1953	Scottish Football League XI	1	(0)

Managerial career
- 1965–1972: Motherwell
- * Club domestic league appearances and goals

Robert Gibb Howitt (15 July 1925 – 31 January 2005) was a Scottish footballer who played in the Football League for Sheffield United and Stoke City.

== Career ==
Howitt started his career in Scotland at Vale of Clyde and Partick Thistle before moving to England with Sheffield United. He made a decent start to English football scoring 14 goals in 44 appearances in 1955–56 as the "Blades" suffered relegation from the First Division. He hit 13 the following season as Sheffield United finished in 6th position in the second tier. He then only scored four in 22 matches in 1957–58 and at the end of the season he signed for league rivals Stoke City. He made fine start to his Stoke career scoring on his debut against Charlton Athletic in a 2–1 victory. He occupied all forward positions in 1958–59 scoring ten goals. New manager Tony Waddington began to use Howitt in a left half position in 1960–61 which saw his goalscoring suffer as a result. However, he began consistent playing in 45 matches in 1961–62 but he often came in for criticism from supporters due to his lack of skill. He played 11 matches in 1962–63 as Stoke won the Second Division and at the end of the season he left to return to Scotland.

He went on to coach at Greenock Morton and was appointed manager of Motherwell in 1965. He spent seven years as manager at Fir Park guiding the "Wells" to the Scottish League Division Two title in 1968–69.

== Career statistics ==
Appearances and goals by club, season and competition
Club	Season	Division	League		FA Cup		League Cup		Total	
Club	Season	Division	Apps	Goals	Apps	Goals	Apps	Goals	Apps	Goals
Sheffield United	1955–56	First Division	40	14	4	0	–		44	14
Sheffield United	1956–57	Second Division	27	13	0	0	–		27	13
Sheffield United	1957–58	Second Division	22	4	2	1	–		24	5
Sheffield United	Total		89	30	6	1	0	0	95	31
Stoke City	1958–59	Second Division	27	10	2	1	–		29	11
Stoke City	1959–60	Second Division	21	4	2	1	–		23	5
Stoke City	1960–61	Second Division	35	0	6	0	1	0	42	0
Stoke City	1961–62	Second Division	40	0	3	0	2	0	45	0
Stoke City	1962–63	Second Division	10	0	0	0	1	0	11	0
Stoke City	Total		133	14	13	2	4	0	150	16
Career Total			222	45	19	3	4	0	245	48

== Honours ==
Stoke City

- Football League Second Division champions: 1962–63
