= Ian Nolan =

English-born Northern Irish footballer

Personal information
- Full name: Ian Robert Nolan
- Date of birth: 9 July 1970 (age 56)
- Place of birth: Liverpool, England
- Height: 6 ft 0 in (1.83 m)
- Position: Full back

Youth career
- 1986–1988: Preston North End

Senior career*
Years	Team	Apps	(Gls)
1988–1990	Northwich Victoria	49	(2)
1990–1991	Marine		
1991–1994	Tranmere Rovers	88	(1)
1994–2000	Sheffield Wednesday	167	(4)
2000–2001	Bradford City	21	(0)
2001–2002	Wigan Athletic	8	(0)
2002–2003	Southport	9	(1)
Total		342	(8)

International career
1996–2002	Northern Ireland	17	(0)
- * Club domestic league appearances and goals

Ian Robert Nolan (born 9 July 1970) is a former professional footballer who played as a full back.

He notably played in the Premier League for Sheffield Wednesday and Bradford City, as well as in the Football League for Tranmere Rovers and Wigan Athletic as well as non-league sides Marine and Southport.

Born in England, he won 17 caps for Northern Ireland.

== Club career ==
Born in Liverpool, Nolan began his career as a trainee with Preston North End, but left in 1988 without making a first team appearance. He played non-league football with Northwich Victoria and Marine, before beginning his Football League career in 1991 with Tranmere Rovers. He helped Tranmere to the semi-finals of the 1993–94 League Cup, where they faced Aston Villa. Nolan scored in the first leg to give them a 3–1 lead at the halfway point in the tie. However Villa won the second leg 3–1 and sent the game to a penalty shootout. In sudden death, Mark Bosnich saved Nolan's penalty to send the Premier League side to Wembley. Nolan moved to Sheffield Wednesday in 1994, and it was while playing for Wednesday in February 1998 that he suffered a broken leg in a challenge with Tottenham Hotspur's Justin Edinburgh; in 2001 (by which time he had joined Bradford City), he attempted to sue both Edinburgh and Hotspur in a legal case similar to that of another ex-Bradford City player, Gordon Watson.(also an ex-Sheffield Wednesday player). After his season at Bradford (in which he scored once against Newcastle United in the League Cup) he then spent one season with Wigan Athletic, before dropping out of the league system to join Southport in October 2002. After a failed trial with Halifax Town in July 2003, Nolan retired from professional football that same year.

== International career ==
Nolan was capped 17 times by Northern Ireland between 1996 and 2002.
