= 1993–94 Motherwell F.C. season =

Motherwell
1993–94 season
- Manager: Tommy McLean
- Stadium: Fir Park
- Scottish Premier Division: 3rd
- Scottish Cup: Fourth round
- Scottish League Cup: Third round
- Highest home attendance: 14,069 vs Rangers, Premier Division, 4 December 1993
- Lowest home attendance: 4,527 vs St Johnstone, Premier Division, 9 November 1993
- Average home league attendance: 7,894

During the 1993–94 season, Motherwell competed in the Scottish Premier Division, in which they finished 3rd.

== Scottish Premier Division ==
=== League table ===
| Pos | Team | Pld | W | D | L | GF | GA | GD | Pts | Qualification or relegation |
|---|---|---|---|---|---|---|---|---|---|---|
| 1 | Rangers (C) | 44 | 22 | 14 | 8 | 74 | 41 | +33 | 58 | Qualification for the Champions League qualifying round |
| 2 | Aberdeen | 44 | 17 | 21 | 6 | 58 | 36 | +22 | 55 | Qualification for the UEFA Cup preliminary round |
| 3 | Motherwell | 44 | 20 | 14 | 10 | 58 | 43 | +15 | 54 | Qualification for the UEFA Cup preliminary round |
| 4 | Celtic | 44 | 15 | 20 | 9 | 51 | 38 | +13 | 50 | |
| 5 | Hibernian | 44 | 16 | 15 | 13 | 53 | 48 | +5 | 47 | |

Source: RSSSF
Rules for classification: 1) points; 2) goal difference; 3) number of goals scored.
(C) Champions

=== Matches ===
| Win | Draw | Loss |

Scottish Premier Division results
| Date | Opponent | Venue | Result F–A | Scorers | Attendance |
|---|---|---|---|---|---|
| 7 August 1993 | Celtic | H | 2–2 | Arnott, Burns | 13,569 |
| 14 August 1993 | Dundee | A | 2–1 | McKinnon, McGrillen | 4,206 |
| 21 August 1993 | Kilmarnock | A | 1–0 | McGrillen | 7,555 |
| 28 August 1993 | Raith Rovers | H | 4–1 | Sinclair (o.g.), McKinnon (pen.), McGrillen, Kirk | 5,644 |
| 4 September 1993 | St Johnstone | A | 0–3 | | 4,576 |
| 11 September 1993 | Heart of Midlothian | H | 2–0 | O'Donnell, McGrillen | 7,662 |
| 18 September 1993 | Partick Thistle | A | 0–1 | | 5,947 |
| 25 September 1993 | Dundee United | A | 0–0 | | 6,633 |
| 2 October 1993 | Aberdeen | H | 0–0 | | 8,597 |
| 6 October 1993 | Rangers | A | 2–1 | Arnott (2) | 39,816 |
| 9 October 1993 | Hibernian | H | 0–2 | | 9,090 |
| 16 October 1993 | Dundee | H | 1–0 | Arnott | 5,126 |
| 30 October 1993 | Kilmarnock | H | 2–2 | Kirk, Martin | 7,384 |
| 6 November 1993 | Raith Rovers | A | 3–0 | Arnott (2), O'Donnell | 4,443 |
| 9 November 1993 | St Johnstone | H | 1–0 | Lambert | 4,527 |
| 13 November 1993 | Aberdeen | A | 1–1 | Kirk | 12,494 |
| 20 November 1993 | Dundee United | H | 2–0 | Kirk, Arnott | 5,807 |
| 24 November 1993 | Celtic | A | 0–2 | | 16,654 |
| 30 November 1993 | Partick Thistle | H | 1–0 | O'Donnell | 5,362 |
| 4 December 1993 | Rangers | H | 0–2 | | 14,069 |
| 11 December 1993 | Hibernian | A | 2–3 | Coyne (2) | 7,429 |
| 15 December 1993 | Heart of Midlothian | A | 3–2 | Coyne (2), McKinnon | 5,531 |
| 18 December 1993 | Dundee | A | 3–1 | O'Donnell (2), Coyne (pen.) | 4,687 |
| 1 January 1994 | Kilmarnock | A | 0–0 | | 10,511 |
| 11 January 1994 | Celtic | H | 2–1 | O'Donnell (2) | 13,159 |
| 22 January 1994 | Partick Thistle | A | 0–0 | | 5,237 |
| 25 January 1994 | Raith Rovers | H | 3–1 | Coyne, Kirk, McGrillen | 5,016 |
| 5 February 1994 | Heart of Midlothian | H | 1–1 | McLaren (o.g.) | 7,009 |
| 8 February 1994 | St Johnstone | A | 1–2 | Coyne | 4,522 |
| 12 February 1994 | Dundee United | A | 2–1 | Bowman (o.g.), van der Hoorn (o.g.) | 6,573 |
| 5 March 1994 | Rangers | A | 1–2 | Lambert | 43,669 |
| 8 March 1994 | Aberdeen | H | 1–1 | McLeish (o.g.) | 7,018 |
| 12 March 1994 | Hibernian | H | 0–0 | | 7,126 |
| 19 March 1994 | Dundee | H | 3–1 | McQuillan (o.g.), Coyne, Martin | 6,127 |
| 26 March 1994 | Celtic | A | 1–0 | Arnott | 36,199 |
| 30 March 1994 | Heart of Midlothian | A | 0–0 | | 7,879 |
| 2 April 1994 | Partick Thistle | H | 2–2 | Coyne, Philliben | 6,444 |
| 16 April 1994 | Aberdeen | A | 0–0 | | 9,642 |
| 23 April 1994 | Hibernian | A | 2–0 | Coyne (pen.), Krivokapic | 6,137 |
| 26 April 1994 | Rangers | H | 2–1 | Philliben, Coyne (pen.) | 14,050 |
| 30 April 1994 | Kilmarnock | H | 1–0 | Coyne | 8,185 |
| 3 May 1994 | Dundee United | H | 1–2 | Kirk | 5,208 |
| 7 May 1994 | Raith Rovers | A | 3–3 | Lambert, Kirk, McKinnon | 3,449 |
| 14 May 1994 | St Johnstone | H | 0–1 | | 7,498 |

== Scottish Cup ==
| Win | Draw | Loss |

Scottish Cup results
| Round | Date | Opponent | Venue | Result F–A | Scorers | Attendance |
|---|---|---|---|---|---|---|
| Third round | 29 January 1994 | Celtic | H | 1–0 | Coyne | 14,061 |
| Fourth round | 19 February 1994 | Dundee United | A | 2–2 | Kirk, Philliben | 12,098 |
| Fourth round replay | 1 March 1994 | Dundee United | H | 0–1 | | 13,002 |

== Scottish League Cup ==
| Win | Draw | Loss |

Scottish League Cup results
| Round | Date | Opponent | Venue | Result F–A | Scorers | Attendance |
|---|---|---|---|---|---|---|
| Second round | 10 August 1993 | Ayr United | A | 6–0 | McGrillen (2), Arnott (2), Graham, Ferguson | 3,474 |
| Third round | 24 August 1993 | Aberdeen | A | 2–5 (a.e.t.) | Arnott, Shannon | 12,993 |
