= 1992–93 Motherwell F.C. season =

Scottish football club season

Motherwell
1992–93 season
- Manager: Tommy McLean
- Stadium: Fir Park
- Scottish Premier Division: 9th
- Scottish Cup: Third round
- Scottish League Cup: Third round
- Highest home attendance: 14,314 vs Rangers, Scottish Cup, 9 January 1993
- Lowest home attendance: 3,030 vs Clyde, League Cup, 11 August 1992
- Average home league attendance: 6,277

During the 1992–93 season, Motherwell competed in the Scottish Premier Division, in which they finished 9th.

== Scottish Premier Division ==
=== League table ===
Pos	Team	Pld	W	D	L	GF	GA	GD	Pts	Qualification or relegation
7	Hibernian	44	12	13	19	54	64	−10	37	
8	Partick Thistle	44	12	12	20	50	71	−21	36	
9	Motherwell	44	11	13	20	46	62	−16	35	
10	Dundee	44	11	12	21	48	68	−20	34	
11	Falkirk (R)	44	11	7	26	60	86	−26	29	Relegation to the 1993–94 Scottish First Division

Source: RSSSF
Rules for classification: 1) points; 2) goal difference; 3) number of goals scored.
(R) Relegated

=== Matches ===
Win	Draw	Loss

Scottish Premier Division results
Date	Opponent	Venue	Result F–A	Scorers	Attendance
1 August 1992	Dundee United	H	0–1		5,037
4 August 1992	Hibernian	H	1–2	Kirk	5,391
8 August 1992	Celtic	A	1–1	Kirk	24,935
15 August 1992	Aberdeen	H	2–1	Arnott, Angus	5,561
22 August 1992	Partick Thistle	A	2–2	Ferguson, Arnott	4,564
29 August 1992	Heart of Midlothian	A	0–1		7,285
2 September 1992	Rangers	H	1–4	Arnott	10,074
12 September 1992	Dundee	A	1–2	O'Donnell	3,792
19 September 1992	St Johnstone	H	3–3	Cooper (pen.), Baker, Kirk	4,002
26 September 1992	Falkirk	A	0–1		4,275
3 October 1992	Airdrieonians	H	2–0	Simpson, Kirk	4,720
7 October 1992	Dundee United	A	1–1	McCart	5,380
17 October 1992	Celtic	H	1–3	McCart	10,016
24 October 1992	Heart of Midlothian	H	1–3	Kirk	5,171
31 October 1992	Rangers	A	2–4	Angus, Martin	38,719
7 November 1992	Partick Thistle	H	0–2		5,379
11 November 1992	Aberdeen	A	0–2		8,725
24 November 1992	St Johnstone	A	0–2		3,582
28 November 1992	Dundee	H	1–3	Arnott	3,534
1 December 1992	Hibernian	A	2–2	Ferguson, Kirk	4,777
5 December 1992	Falkirk	H	3–1	Kirk, Martin, McGrillen	5,018
12 December 1992	Airdrieonians	A	2–0	O'Donnell, Arnott	3,630
26 December 1992	Aberdeen	H	0–2		7,907
2 January 1993	Partick Thistle	A	1–0	Martin	6,467
23 January 1993	Heart of Midlothian	A	0–0		6,610
30 January 1993	Celtic	A	1–1	Angus	18,513
2 February 1993	Dundee United	H	2–0	Kirk, McGrillen	3,783
6 February 1993	Airdrieonians	H	0–0		5,382
13 February 1993	Hibernian	H	0–0		5,021
20 February 1993	Falkirk	A	3–1	Werr (o.g.), McGrillen, Dolan	4,536
23 February 1993	Rangers	H	0–4		14,006
27 February 1993	St Johnstone	H	1–1	Dolan	4,278
6 March 1993	Dundee	A	1–1	Griffin	3,230
9 March 1993	Dundee United	A	0–0		5,134
20 March 1993	Partick Thistle	H	2–3	Kirk, McGrillen	6,499
27 March 1993	Aberdeen	A	0–1		9,155
3 April 1993	Celtic	H	2–0	Kirk, Cooper	10,102
10 April 1993	Rangers	A	0–1		41,353
17 April 1993	Dundee	H	1–2	McGrillen	4,287
20 April 1993	Heart of Midlothian	H	2–1	O'Donnell, McGrillen	4,355
24 April 1993	St Johnstone	A	0–0		5,544
1 May 1993	Hibernian	A	0–1		4,799
8 May 1993	Falkirk	H	2–1	McCart, Arnott	8,577
15 May 1993	Airdrieonians	A	2–1	Graham, O'Donnell	3,088

== Scottish Cup ==
Win	Draw	Loss

Scottish Cup results
Round	Date	Opponent	Venue	Result F–A	Scorers	Attendance
Third round	9 January 1993	Rangers	H	0–2		14,314

== Scottish League Cup ==
Win	Draw	Loss

Scottish League Cup results
Round	Date	Opponent	Venue	Result F–A	Scorers	Attendance
Second round	11 August 1992	Clyde	H	4–2	Angus, Ferguson (3)	3,030
Third round	19 August 1992	Falkirk	H	0–1		5,510
