= Orlando Trustfull =

Dutch footballer (born 1970)

Personal information
- Date of birth: 4 August 1970 (age 56)
- Place of birth: Amsterdam, Netherlands
- Height: 1.83 m (6 ft 0 in)
- Position: Midfielder

Youth career
- Sloten/Rivalen
- Blauw Wit

Senior career*
Years	Team	Apps	(Gls)
1989–1990	Haarlem	14	(0)
1990–1992	SVV/Dordrecht '90	50	(1)
1992	FC Twente	9	(1)
1992–1996	Feyenoord	78	(13)
1996–1997	Sheffield Wednesday	19	(3)
1997–2001	Vitesse	53	(6)
Total		223	(24)

International career
1995	Netherlands	2	(0)

Managerial career
- 2011–2013: Ajax B1
- 2013–2014: Ajax A1
- 2014–2015: Netherlands U-19 (assistant manager)
- 2015: Netherlands U-17 (assistant manager)
- 2015–2016: Ajax (assistant manager)
- 2016: Inter Milan (assistant manager)
- 2017: Crystal Palace (assistant manager)
- 2019–2020: Atlanta United (assistant manager)
- * Club domestic league appearances and goals

Orlando Trustfull (born 4 August 1970) is a Dutch football coach and former professional player.

As a player, he was midfielder who notably had a spell in the Premier League for Sheffield Wednesday, as well as playing in the Eredivisie for FC Twente, Feyenoord and Vitesse. He also played for Haarlem and SVV/Dordrecht '90. He was capped twice by Netherlands in 1995.

Following his retirement he moved into coaching and was a youth team coach for Ajax, Netherlands U-19 and Netherlands U-17 before returning to Ajax as Frank de Boer's assistant. He has since worked under de Boer at Inter Milan, Crystal Palace and Atlanta United.

== Club career ==
Trustfull was born in Amsterdam and played as a youth player for De Rivalen, Ajax Amsterdam and Blauw-Wit before signing his first professional contract at HFC Haarlem that played in the Eerste Divisie. The midfielder played 14 matches in his first season and was transferred to fellow Eerste Divisie team SVV Schiedam that merged with Dordrecht '90 a year later. Trustfull was a regular first team player and managed to score his first professional goal in the 1991–92 season.

He spent some time at FC Twente where he scored another goal before he was signed by Feyenoord where he had a hard time gaining his first team position but succeeded in this later.

Trustfull felt he was ready to move on to a foreign country and switched to Sheffield Wednesday in the Premier League, where he played 19 matches and scored three goals in his first season. He struggled with settling in England and decided to return to his native country to play for Vitesse Arnhem, where he played a decent first season, but suffered several injuries in the years after. He ended his career after the 2000–01 season having played 223 professional matches and having scored 24 goals.

== International career ==
In the 1994–95 season Trustfull was selected for the Netherlands national team twice. He participated in two Euro 96 qualification matches versus Belarus and Malta, which were won 1–0 and 4–0 respectively.

== Coaching career ==
Trustfull was the assistant manager at Internazionale and was brought in by Frank de Boer. As of the start of the 2017–18 season he joined de Boer as a member of the coaching staff at Crystal Palace. He once again joined Frank de Boer on 14 January 2019 when Trustfull was announced as assistant manager of defending champions Atlanta United in Major League Soccer.

== Personal life ==
Trustfull is married to Dutch television presenter Quinty Trustfull. Their son Malik Trustfull is a football player as well, currently playing in the ranks of the Ajax Youth Academy.
