= Wayne Collins (footballer) =

English footballer

Personal information
- Full name: Wayne Anthony Collins
- Date of birth: 4 March 1969 (age 57)
- Place of birth: Manchester, England
- Height: 6 ft 0 in (1.83 m)
- Position: Midfielder

Senior career*
Years	Team	Apps	(Gls)
1992–1993	Winsford United		
1993–1996	Crewe Alexandra	117	(15)
1996–1998	Sheffield Wednesday	31	(6)
1998–2001	Fulham	60	(4)
2001–2003	Crewe Alexandra	20	(1)
2003–2004	Stockport County	2	(0)
Total		230	(26)
- * Club domestic league appearances and goals

Wayne Collins (born 4 March 1969) is an English football midfielder.

== Club career ==
=== Crewe Alexandra ===
Collins began his career at Crewe Alexandra and made 117 league appearances.

=== Sheffield Wednesday ===
Collins signed for Premier League side Sheffield Wednesday in August 1996. He went on to score 6 goals in 31 league appearances for the club, before being sold to Fulham, then in the third tier of English football, in January 1998.

=== Fulham ===
At Fulham Collins helped them to two promotions. He made five league appearances during Fulham's 2000/01 season after which they were promoted to the Premier League.

=== Later career ===
In Summer 2001 Collins returned to Crewe Alexandra, where he scored once against Manchester City, and also had a spell at Stockport County.

== Honours ==
Fulham

- Football League Second Division: 1998–99
