= 1994–95 Motherwell F.C. season =

Motherwell
1994–95 season
- Manager: Alex McLeish
- Stadium: Fir Park
- Scottish Premier Division: 2nd
- Scottish Cup: Fourth round
- Scottish League Cup: Third round
- UEFA Cup: First round

During the 1994–95 season, Motherwell competed in the Scottish Premier Division, in which they finished 2nd.

== Scottish Premier Division ==
=== League table ===
Pos	Team	Pld	W	D	L	GF	GA	GD	Pts	Qualification or relegation
1	Rangers (C)	36	20	9	7	60	35	+25	69	Qualification for the Champions League qualifying round
2	Motherwell	36	14	12	10	50	50	0	54	Qualification for the UEFA Cup preliminary round
3	Hibernian	36	12	17	7	49	37	+12	53	
4	Celtic	36	11	18	7	39	33	+6	51	Qualification for the Cup Winners' Cup first round (Note: Celtic qualified for the 1995–96 UEFA Cup Winners' Cup by winning the 1994–95 Scottish Cup.)
5	Falkirk	36	12	12	12	48	47	+1	48	

Updated to match(es) played on end of season. Source: Soccerbase
Rules for classification: 1) Points; 2) Goal difference; 3) Goals scored
(C) Champions

=== Matches ===
Win	Draw	Loss

Scottish Premier Division results
Date	Opponent	Venue	Result F–A	Scorers	Attendance
13 August 1994	Rangers	A	1–2	Coyne (pen.)	42,491
20 August 1994	Heart of Midlothian	H	1–1	Coyne	8,249
27 August 1994	Kilmarnock	A	1–0	Coyne	7,388
10 September 1994	Dundee United	A	1–1	Kirk	7,440
17 September 1994	Hibernian	H	1–1	Shannon	7,005
24 September 1994	Partick Thistle	A	2–2	Davies, Coyne	4,786
1 October 1994	Celtic	H	1–1	Arnott	10,869
8 October 1994	Falkirk	H	5–3	Coyne (2), Davies, Arnott (2)	6,239
15 October 1994	Aberdeen	A	3–1	McKinnon, Kirk, Coyne	12,489
22 October 1994	Rangers	H	2–1	Arnott (2)	11,160
29 October 1994	Kilmarnock	H	3–2	Coyne (2), Martin	7,436
5 November 1994	Heart of Midlothian	A	2–1	Shannon, Coyne	8,889
8 November 1994	Dundee United	H	1–1	Martin	6,145
19 November 1994	Hibernian	A	2–2	Coyne, Davies	9,160
26 November 1994	Partick Thistle	H	3–1	Coyne, Davies, Arnott	6,893
3 December 1994	Celtic	A	2–2	Coyne (2)	21,465
10 December 1994	Aberdeen	H	0–1		7,020
26 December 1994	Falkirk	A	1–0	Shannon	7,937
31 December 1994	Rangers	H	1–3	McGrillen	11,269
8 January 1995	Heart of Midlothian	H	1–2	McGrillen	5,117
13 January 1995	Hibernian	H	0–0		6,724
17 January 1995	Kilmarnock	A	0–2		7,521
21 January 1995	Dundee United	A	1–6	Coyne	7,062
4 February 1995	Celtic	H	1–0	McKinnon	10,771
25 February 1995	Aberdeen	A	2–0	Burns, McKinnon (pen.)	10,319
7 March 1995	Falkirk	H	2–2	Lambert, May	6,100
14 March 1995	Partick Thistle	A	0–0		3,525
18 March 1995	Dundee United	H	2–1	Burns, Arnott	4,457
22 March 1995	Hibernian	A	0–2		5,395
1 April 1995	Celtic	A	1–1	Coyne	24,047
8 April 1995	Partick Thistle	H	1–2	Burns	9,631
15 April 1995	Falkirk	A	0–3		5,756
18 April 1995	Aberdeen	H	2–1	McSkimming, Arnott	7,155
30 April 1995	Rangers	A	2–0	Arnott, McSkimming	43,576
6 May 1995	Kilmarnock	H	2–0	Arnott, May	7,760
13 May 1995	Heart of Midlothian	A	0–2		11,172

== Scottish Cup ==
Win	Draw	Loss

Scottish Cup results
Round	Date	Opponent	Venue	Result F–A	Scorers	Attendance
Third round	6 February 1995	Falkirk	A	2–0	Burns (2)	7,552
Fourth round	18 February 1995	Hibernian	A	0–2		10,639

== Scottish League Cup ==
Win	Draw	Loss

Scottish League Cup results
Round	Date	Opponent	Venue	Result F–A	Scorers	Attendance
Second round	16 August 1994	Clydebank	H	3–1	Burns, Coyne (pen.), Kirk	4,172
Third round	31 August 1994	Airdrieonians	H	1–2 (a.e.t.)	McCart	6,010

== UEFA Cup ==
Win	Draw	Loss

UEFA Cup results
Round	Date	Opponent	Venue	Result F–A	Scorers	Attendance	Ref.
Preliminary round, first leg	9 August 1994	(Faroe Islands) Havnar Bóltfelag	H	3–0	Coyne, McGrillen, Kirk	7,517	
Preliminary round, second leg	23 August 1994	(Faroe Islands) Havnar Bóltfelag	A	4–1	Kirk (2), Davies, Burns	750	
First round, first leg	13 September 1994	(Germany) Borussia Dortmund	A	0–1		35,420	
First round, second leg	27 September 1994	(Germany) Borussia Dortmund	H	0–2		9,362	
