= Mark McKeever =

Footballer (born 1978)

Personal information
- Full name: Mark Anthony McKeever
- Date of birth: 16 November 1978 (age 47)
- Place of birth: Derry, Northern Ireland
- Position: Midfielder

Youth career
- Norwich City

Senior career*
Years	Team	Apps	(Gls)
1996–1997	Peterborough	3	(0)
1997–2001	Sheffield Wednesday	5	(0)
1998–1999	→ Bristol Rovers (loan)	7	(0)
1999	→ Reading (loan)	7	(2)
2001	→ Bristol Rovers (loan)	6	(0)
2001–2003	Bristol Rovers	30	(0)
2003–2006	Weston-super-Mare	132	(6)
2006	→ Gloucester City (loan)	5	(1)
2006–2008	Bath City	49	(7)
2008	→ Mangotsfield United (loan)	6	(0)
2008–2009	Weston-super-Mare	6	(1)

International career
	Republic of Ireland U19	12	
	Republic of Ireland U21	4	
- * Club domestic league appearances and goals

Mark Anthony McKeever (born 16 November 1978) is an Irish former professional footballer who played as a midfielder. Born in Northern Ireland, he represented the Republic of Ireland internationally at youth levels U19 and U21.

== Career ==
McKeever began his football career with Norwich City as a youth team player. He was eventually released and moved on to Peterborough United with ex-Canaries coach Kit Carson. McKeever became a trainee with the club, but after only three appearances he was transferred to Sheffield Wednesday in April 1997 with David Billington for £1,000,000.

McKeever made three appearances in the Premier League and was looking to break into the first team before a foot injury prematurely ended his season. He was subsequently sent on loan to Bristol Rovers and later Reading. During his stint with the Royals he played in a 4–0 away victory over Stoke City. However, over the following weeks, Stoke full-back Jason Kavanagh made a full catalogue of Division Two wingers look like Best at his peak.

McKeever made his sixth appearance for Wednesday in an FA Cup tie against Bristol City in December 1999. A year later, McKeever was linked with a return to Bristol Rovers after they had supposedly tabled a £100,000 bid for him. But the permanent move did not materialise.

McKeever moved to Bristol Rovers on loan for two months in 2001. In March 2001, the move was made permanent, with McKeever moving south on a free transfer. He spent two years with Rovers before being released in May 2003. He then joined Weston-super-Mare in August 2003, for whom he played for a period of three years before signing for Bath City in May 2006. It was here that he won a Southern League winners medal in 2007.

Bath City sent McKeever on loan in January 2008 to Mangotsfield United, but he was soon transferred to fellow Conference South club Weston-super-Mare in March 2008 for his second stint with the club.

On 18 August 2009, he was forced to retire following injury.

He has been capped by the Republic of Ireland at Under-18 level (12 caps) and by their Under-21s (4 caps). McKeever played for the Republic of Ireland national under-19 football team in the 1997 UEFA European Under-18 Football Championship finals in Iceland.
