= David Billington (footballer) =

English footballer

Personal information
- Date of birth: 15 January 1980 (age 46)
- Place of birth: Oxford, England
- Position: Defender

Youth career
- Peterborough United

Senior career*
Years	Team	Apps	(Gls)
1996–1997	Peterborough United	5	(0)
1997–2001	Sheffield Wednesday	0	(0)
2000	→ Peterborough United (loan)	0	(0)

International career
- Republic of Ireland U18
- * Club domestic league appearances and goals

David Billington (born 15 January 1980) is a former professional footballer who played for Peterborough United and Sheffield Wednesday. He also represented the Republic of Ireland national under-18 football team.

Billington signed for Sheffield Wednesday for £1,000,000 from Peterborough United along with winger Mark McKeever in April 1997. But since then he endured a constant injury nightmare.

He returned to his old club Peterborough in September 2000 on loan in a bid to help him regain fitness following 18 months on the treatment table. But he broke down in his first appearance for the reserves and he was forced to retire from the game in February 2001 at the age 21 due to his knee injuries.
