= Willie McClymont =

Scottish footballer

William McClymont (born 13 October 1953) is a Scottish former footballer who played as a winger for Cumbernauld United, Motherwell, Stranraer and Preston Makedonia.
