= List of foreign Premier League goalscorers =

This is a list of foreign Premier League goalscorers. The Premier League, which began in its current guise in 1992, has been represented by 123 foreign FIFA affiliated nations in total. As of September 2026, Cyprus became the most recent country to be represented, when Marcus Edwards was called up and played for Cyprus, 106 different foreign FIFA affiliated nations have been represented in the Premier League scorelist.

The following players meet both of the following two criteria:

1. Have scored at least one Premier League goal. Players who were contracted to Premier League clubs, but only scored in lower league, cup and/or European games, or did not score in competitive games at all, are not included.
2. Are considered foreign, i.e., outside the United Kingdom, determined by whether or not he is eligible to play for the national teams of England, Scotland, Wales or Northern Ireland, specifically,

If a player has been capped at international level, the national team is used; if he has been capped by more than one country, the highest level (or the most recent) team is used. These include British players with dual citizenship.
If a player has not been capped at international level, his country of birth is used, except those who were born abroad from British parents or moved to the United Kingdom at a young age, and those who clearly indicated to have switched his nationality to another nation.

Clubs listed are those for which the player has scored at least one Premier League goal.

In bold: Players who have scored at least one goal in the Premier League in the current season (2026–27), and are still at a club for which they have scored. This does not include current players of a Premier League club who have not scored a goal in the Premier League in the current season.

For each country, the leading scorer is indicated by the number of goals that he scored in the Premier League.

Details correct as of 22 November 2026.

== Albania ==
- Armando Broja – Southampton, Chelsea, Burnley (9)

== Algeria ==
- Rayan Aït-Nouri – Wolverhampton Wanderers
- Nadir Belhadj – Portsmouth
- **Mohamed Belloumi** – **Hull City**
- Ali Benarbia – Manchester City
- Saïd Benrahma – West Ham United
- Hameur Bouazza – Watford, Fulham
- Sofiane Feghouli – West Ham United
- Rachid Ghezzal – Leicester City
- Kamel Ghilas – Hull City
- Adlène Guedioura – Wolverhampton Wanderers
- **Jaouen Hadjam** – **Brighton & Hove Albion**
- Riyad Mahrez – Leicester City, Manchester City (82)
- Islam Slimani – Leicester City
- Moussa Saïb – Tottenham Hotspur
- Hassan Yebda – Portsmouth

== Angola ==
- Hélder Costa – Wolverhampton Wanderers, Leeds United (4)
- Manucho – Hull City

== Antigua and Barbuda ==
- Dexter Blackstock – Southampton
- Mikele Leigertwood – Crystal Palace, Reading (2)

== Argentina ==
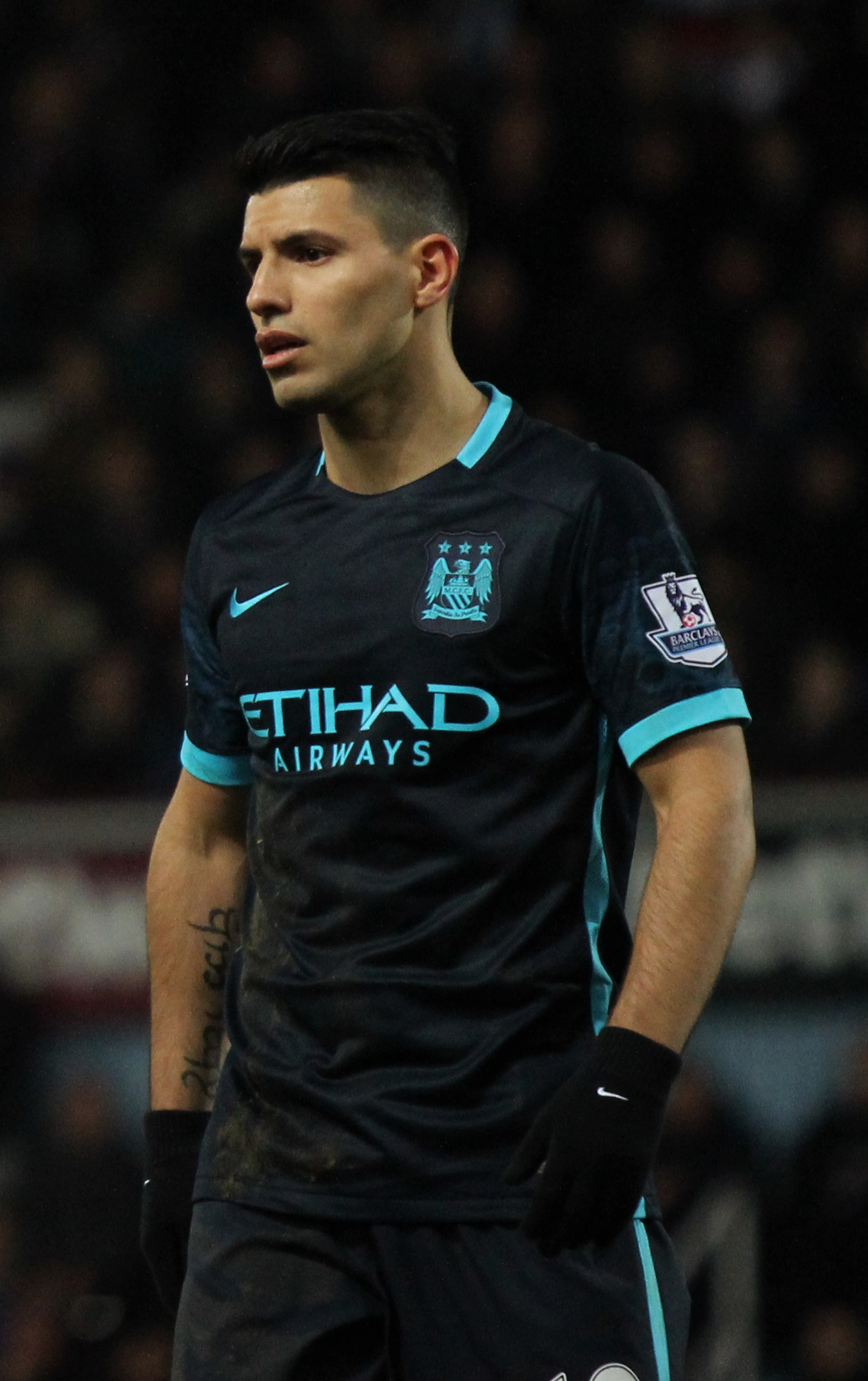
Sergio Agüero is the highest scoring South American player in Premier League history

- Sergio Agüero – Manchester City (184)
- Charly Alcaraz – Southampton, Everton
- Julián Álvarez – Manchester City
- Julio Arca – Sunderland, Middlesbrough
- Christian Bassedas – Newcastle United
- **Emiliano Buendía** – Norwich City, **Aston Villa**
- Facundo Buonanotte – Brighton & Hove Albion, Leicester City
- Jonathan Calleri – West Ham United
- Esteban Cambiasso – Leicester City
- Horacio Carbonari – Derby County
- Taty Castellanos – West Ham United
- Fabricio Coloccini – Newcastle United
- Daniel Cordone – Newcastle United
- Hernán Crespo – Chelsea
- Andrés D'Alessandro – Portsmouth
- Martín Demichelis – Manchester City
- Ángel Di María – Manchester United
- Franco Di Santo – Blackburn Rovers, Wigan Athletic
- Nicolás Domínguez – Nottingham Forest
- Alejandro Faurlín – Queens Park Rangers
- **Enzo Fernández** – Chelsea, **Manchester City**
- Federico Fernández – Swansea City, Newcastle United
- Mauro Formica – Blackburn Rovers
- Juan Foyth – Tottenham Hotspur
- Esteban Fuertes – Derby County
- Ramiro Funes Mori – Everton
- Alejandro Garnacho – Manchester United, Chelsea
- Jonás Gutiérrez – Newcastle United
- Gabriel Heinze – Manchester United
- Gonzalo Higuaín – Chelsea
- Erik Lamela – Tottenham Hotspur
- Manuel Lanzini – West Ham United
- Giovani Lo Celso – Tottenham Hotspur
- **Alexis Mac Allister** – Brighton & Hove Albion, **Liverpool**
- Carlos Marinelli – Middlesbrough
- Lisandro Martínez – Manchester United
- Javier Mascherano – Liverpool
- Juan Carlos Menseguez – West Bromwich Albion
- Nicolás Otamendi – Manchester City
- Sixto Peralta – Ipswich Town
- Roberto Pereyra – Watford
- Maxi Rodríguez – Liverpool
- Marcos Rojo – Manchester United
- Cristian Romero – Tottenham Hotspur
- Facundo Sava – Fulham
- Marcos Senesi – Bournemouth
- Denis Stracqualursi – Everton
- Mauricio Taricco – Tottenham Hotspur
- Carlos Tevez – West Ham United, Manchester United, Manchester City
- Leonardo Ulloa – Leicester City, Brighton & Hove Albion
- Alejo Véliz – Tottenham Hotspur
- Juan Sebastián Verón – Manchester United, Chelsea
- Luciano Vietto – Fulham
- Emanuel Villa – Derby County
- Claudio Yacob – West Bromwich Albion
- Pablo Zabaleta – Manchester City
- Mauro Zárate – Birmingham City, West Ham United

== Armenia ==
- Henrikh Mkhitaryan – Manchester United, Arsenal (13)

== Australia ==
- John Aloisi – Coventry City
- Tim Cahill – Everton
- Brett Emerton – Blackburn Rovers
- Hayden Foxe – Portsmouth
- Richard Garcia – Hull City
- Chris Herd – Aston Villa
- Brett Holman – Aston Villa
- Mile Jedinak – Crystal Palace
- Richard Johnson – Watford
- Harry Kewell – Leeds United, Liverpool
- Stan Lazaridis – West Ham United, Birmingham City
- Aaron Mooy – Huddersfield Town, Brighton & Hove Albion
- Lucas Neill – Blackburn Rovers, West Ham United
- Robbie Slater – West Ham United, Southampton
- Danny Tiatto – Manchester City
- Mark Viduka – Leeds United, Middlesbrough, Newcastle United (92)

== Austria ==
- Marko Arnautović – Stoke City, West Ham United (43)
- Carney Chukwuemeka – Chelsea
- Christian Fuchs – Leicester City
- Saša Kalajdžić – Wolverhampton Wanderers
- Valentino Lazaro – Newcastle United
- Stefan Maierhofer – Wolverhampton Wanderers
- Emanuel Pogatetz – Middlesbrough
- Sebastian Prödl – Watford
- Paul Scharner – Wigan Athletic, West Bromwich Albion
- Andreas Weimann – Aston Villa

== Bangladesh ==
- Hamza Choudhury – Leicester City (1)

== Barbados ==
- Emmerson Boyce – Wigan Athletic (11)
- Gregory Goodridge – Queens Park Rangers

== Belarus ==
- Alexander Hleb – Arsenal, Birmingham City (8)

== Belgium ==
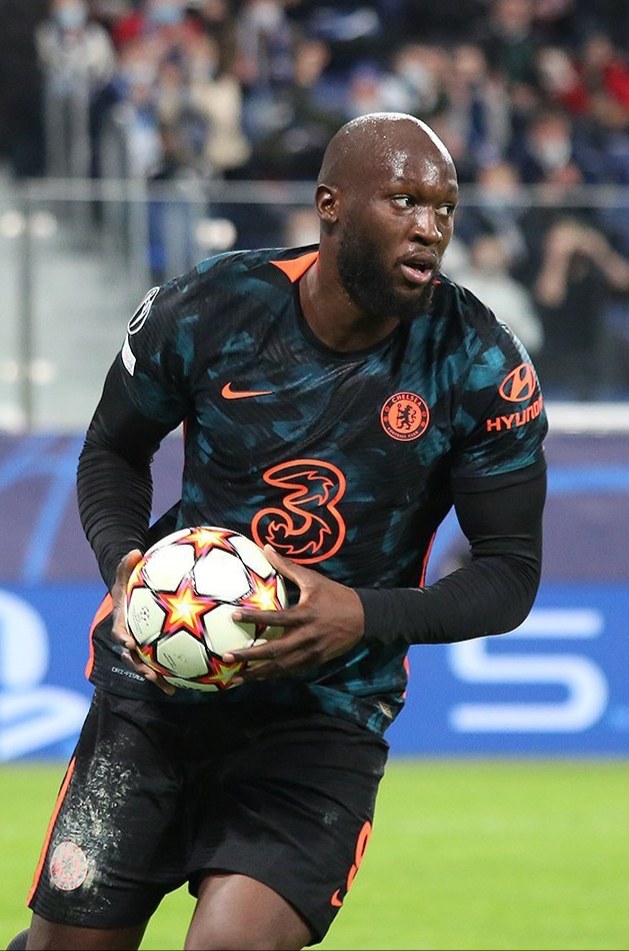
Romelu Lukaku is the highest scoring Belgian in Premier League history

- Philippe Albert – Newcastle United
- Ameen Al-Dakhil – Burnley
- Toby Alderweireld – Southampton, Tottenham Hotspur
- Michy Batshuayi – Chelsea, Crystal Palace
- Christian Benteke – Aston Villa, Liverpool, Crystal Palace
- Dedryck Boyata – Bolton Wanderers
- Timothy Castagne – Leicester City, Fulham
- Nacer Chadli – Tottenham Hotspur, West Bromwich Albion
- Gilles De Bilde – Sheffield Wednesday
- Kevin De Bruyne – Manchester City
- **Maxim De Cuyper** – **Brighton & Hove Albion**
- Ritchie De Laet – Norwich City, Leicester City
- Steven Defour – Burnley
- Marc Degryse – Sheffield Wednesday
- Mousa Dembélé – Fulham, Tottenham Hotspur
- Leander Dendoncker – Wolverhampton Wanderers, Aston Villa
- Laurent Depoitre – Huddersfield Town
- **Jérémy Doku** – **Manchester City**
- Björn Engels – Aston Villa
- Wout Faes – Leicester City
- Marouane Fellaini – Everton, Manchester United
- Eden Hazard – Chelsea
- Adnan Januzaj – Manchester United
- Christian Kabasele – Watford
- Vincent Kompany – Manchester City
- Roland Lamah – Swansea City
- **Roméo Lavia** – Southampton, **Chelsea**
- Romelu Lukaku – West Bromwich Albion, Everton, Manchester United, Chelsea (121)
- Orel Mangala – Nottingham Forest, Everton
- Isaac Mbenza – Huddersfield Town
- Kevin Mirallas – Everton
- Émile Mpenza – Manchester City
- Luc Nilis – Aston Villa
- Amadou Onana – Everton, Aston Villa
- Divock Origi – Liverpool
- Dennis Praet – Leicester City
- Cédric Roussel – Coventry City
- Albert Sambi Lokonga – Luton Town
- Branko Strupar – Derby County
- **Youri Tielemans** – Leicester City, Aston Villa, **Manchester United**
- Leandro Trossard – Brighton & Hove Albion, Arsenal
- Jelle Van Damme – Wolverhampton Wanderers
- Thomas Vermaelen – Arsenal
- Jan Vertonghen – Tottenham Hotspur

== Benin ==
- Rudy Gestede – Aston Villa, Middlesbrough
- Steve Mounié – Huddersfield Town
- Stéphane Sessègnon – Sunderland, West Bromwich Albion (25)

== Bermuda ==
- Shaun Goater – Manchester City (13)

== Bosnia and Herzegovina ==
- Anel Ahmedhodžić – Sheffield United
- Asmir Begović – Stoke City
- Edin Džeko – Manchester City (50)
- Sead Kolašinac – Arsenal
- Mario Vrančić – Norwich City

== Brazil ==
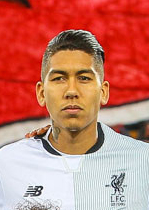
Roberto Firmino is the highest scoring Brazilian in Premier League history

- Alex – Chelsea
- Alisson – Liverpool
- **Alysson** – **Aston Villa**
- Afonso Alves – Middlesbrough
- Anderson – Manchester United
- Felipe Anderson – West Ham United
- André – Wolverhampton Wanderers
- Antony – Manchester United
- Fábio Aurélio – Liverpool
- Júlio Baptista – Arsenal
- Juliano Belletti – Chelsea
- Bernard – Everton
- Caçapa – Newcastle United
- Casemiro – Manchester United
- Philippe Coutinho – Liverpool, Aston Villa
- **Jair Cunha** – **Nottingham Forest**
- Matheus Cunha – Wolverhampton Wanderers, Manchester United
- Danilo – Manchester City
- Danilo – Nottingham Forest
- Denílson – Arsenal
- Edu – Arsenal
- Elano – Manchester City
- Emerson – Middlesbrough
- **Emersonn** – **Ipswich Town**
- Estêvão – Chelsea
- **Evanilson** – **Bournemouth**
- Fabinho – Liverpool
- Fábio – Manchester United
- Fernandinho – Manchester City
- Fernando – Manchester City
- Roberto Firmino – Liverpool (82)
- Matheus França – Crystal Palace
- Fred – Manchester United
- Geovanni – Manchester City, Hull City
- Gilberto – Tottenham Hotspur
- João Gomes – Wolverhampton Wanderers
- **Bruno Guimarães** – Newcastle United, **Arsenal**
- Ilan – West Ham United
- Isaías – Coventry City
- Gabriel Jesus – Manchester City, Arsenal
- **Igor Jesus** – **Nottingham Forest**
- Jô – Manchester City, Everton
- Joelinton – Newcastle United
- Willian José – Wolverhampton Wanderers
- Juninho – Middlesbrough
- Kenedy – Chelsea, Newcastle United
- Kevin – Fulham
- Kléberson – Manchester United
- Lucas Leiva – Liverpool
- David Luiz – Chelsea, Arsenal
- Douglas Luiz – Aston Villa
- Lyanco – Southampton
- **Gabriel Magalhães** – **Arsenal**
- Gabriel Martinelli – Arsenal
- Morato – Nottingham Forest
- Lucas Moura – Tottenham Hotspur
- **Rodrigo Muniz** – **Fulham**
- Murillo – Nottingham Forest
- Oscar – Chelsea
- Lucas Paquetá – West Ham United
- Alexandre Pato – Chelsea
- Paulinho – Tottenham Hotspur
- Gabriel Paulista – Arsenal
- **João Pedro** – Watford, Brighton & Hove Albion, **Chelsea**
- Andreas Pereira – Manchester United, Fulham
- Matheus Pereira – West Bromwich Albion
- Rafael – Manchester United
- Ramires – Chelsea
- Raphinha – Leeds United
- **Rayan** – **Bournemouth**
- Richarlison – Watford, Everton, Tottenham Hotspur
- Douglas Rinaldi – Watford
- Robinho – Manchester City
- Fábio Rochemback – Middlesbrough
- Emerson Royal – Tottenham Hotspur
- Sandro – Tottenham Hotspur
- André Santos – Arsenal
- Savinho – Manchester City
- Gilberto Silva – Arsenal
- Thiago Silva – Chelsea
- Vinícius Souza – Sheffield United
- Sylvinho – Arsenal
- Tetê – Leicester City
- **Igor Thiago** – **Brentford**
- Emerson Thome – Sheffield Wednesday, Sunderland
- Carlos Vinícius – Tottenham Hotspur, Fulham
- Wesley – Aston Villa
- Willian – Chelsea, Arsenal, Fulham

== Bulgaria ==
- Dimitar Berbatov – Tottenham Hotspur, Manchester United, Fulham (94)
- Valeri Bojinov – Manchester City
- Boncho Genchev – Ipswich Town
- Radostin Kishishev – Charlton Athletic
- Martin Petrov – Manchester City, Bolton Wanderers
- Stiliyan Petrov – Aston Villa
- Svetoslav Todorov – West Ham United, Portsmouth

== Burkina Faso ==
- **Dango Ouattara** – Bournemouth, **Brentford** (17)
- Bertrand Traoré – Chelsea, Aston Villa, Sunderland

== Burundi ==
- Saido Berahino – West Bromwich Albion (23)
- Gaël Bigirimana – Newcastle United

== Cameroon ==
- Benoît Assou-Ekotto – Tottenham Hotspur
- Timothée Atouba – Tottenham Hotspur
- Carlos Baleba – Brighton & Hove Albion
- Sébastien Bassong – Tottenham Hotspur, Norwich City
- André Bikey – Reading, Burnley
- Eric Maxim Choupo-Moting – Stoke City
- George Elokobi – Wolverhampton Wanderers
- Samuel Eto'o – Chelsea, Everton
- Marc-Vivien Foé – West Ham United, Manchester City
- Geremi – Middlesbrough, Chelsea, Newcastle United
- Joseph-Désiré Job – Middlesbrough
- Lauren – Arsenal
- Joël Matip – Liverpool
- **Bryan Mbeumo** – Brentford, **Manchester United** (57)
- Patrick Mboma – Sunderland
- Alex Song – Arsenal
- Somen Tchoyi – West Bromwich Albion
- Pierre Womé – Fulham

== Canada ==
- Scott Arfield – Burnley
- David Edgar – Newcastle United
- Junior Hoilett – Blackburn Rovers, Queens Park Rangers, Cardiff City
- Simeon Jackson – Norwich City
- Daniel Jebbison – Sheffield United, Bournemouth
- Liam Millar – Hull City
- Tomasz Radzinski – Everton, Fulham (35)
- Paul Stalteri – Tottenham Hotspur
- Frank Yallop – Ipswich Town

== Chile ==
- Clarence Acuña – Newcastle United
- Jean Beausejour – Birmingham City, Wigan Athletic
- Ben Brereton Díaz – Sheffield United
- Mark González – Liverpool
- Ángelo Henríquez – Wigan Athletic
- Gonzalo Jara – West Bromwich Albion
- Luis Jiménez – West Ham United
- Javier Margas – West Ham United
- Alexis Sánchez – Arsenal, Manchester United (63)
- Eduardo Vargas – Queens Park Rangers

== China PR ==
- Sun Jihai – Manchester City (3)
- Zheng Zhi – Charlton Athletic

== Colombia ==
- Steven Alzate – Brighton & Hove Albion
- Juan Pablo Ángel – Aston Villa (44)
- Jhon Arias – Wolverhampton Wanderers
- Faustino Asprilla – Newcastle United
- Luis Díaz – Liverpool
- Jhon Durán – Aston Villa
- Radamel Falcao – Manchester United, Chelsea
- Cucho Hernández – Watford
- José Izquierdo – Brighton & Hove Albion
- **Jefferson Lerma** – Bournemouth, **Crystal Palace**
- Yerry Mina – Everton
- Daniel Muñoz – Crystal Palace
- Hámilton Ricard – Middlesbrough
- Hugo Rodallega – Wigan Athletic, Fulham
- James Rodríguez – Everton
- Davinson Sánchez – Tottenham Hotspur
- Luis Sinisterra – Leeds United, Bournemouth
- Jhon Viáfara – Portsmouth
- Juan Camilo Zúñiga – Watford

== Congo (Republic of the Congo) ==
- Thievy Bifouma – West Bromwich Albion
- Christopher Samba – Blackburn Rovers (16)

== Costa Rica ==
- Joel Campbell – Arsenal
- Bryan Oviedo – Everton
- Bryan Ruiz – Fulham
- Paulo Wanchope – Derby County, West Ham United, Manchester City (50)

== Croatia ==
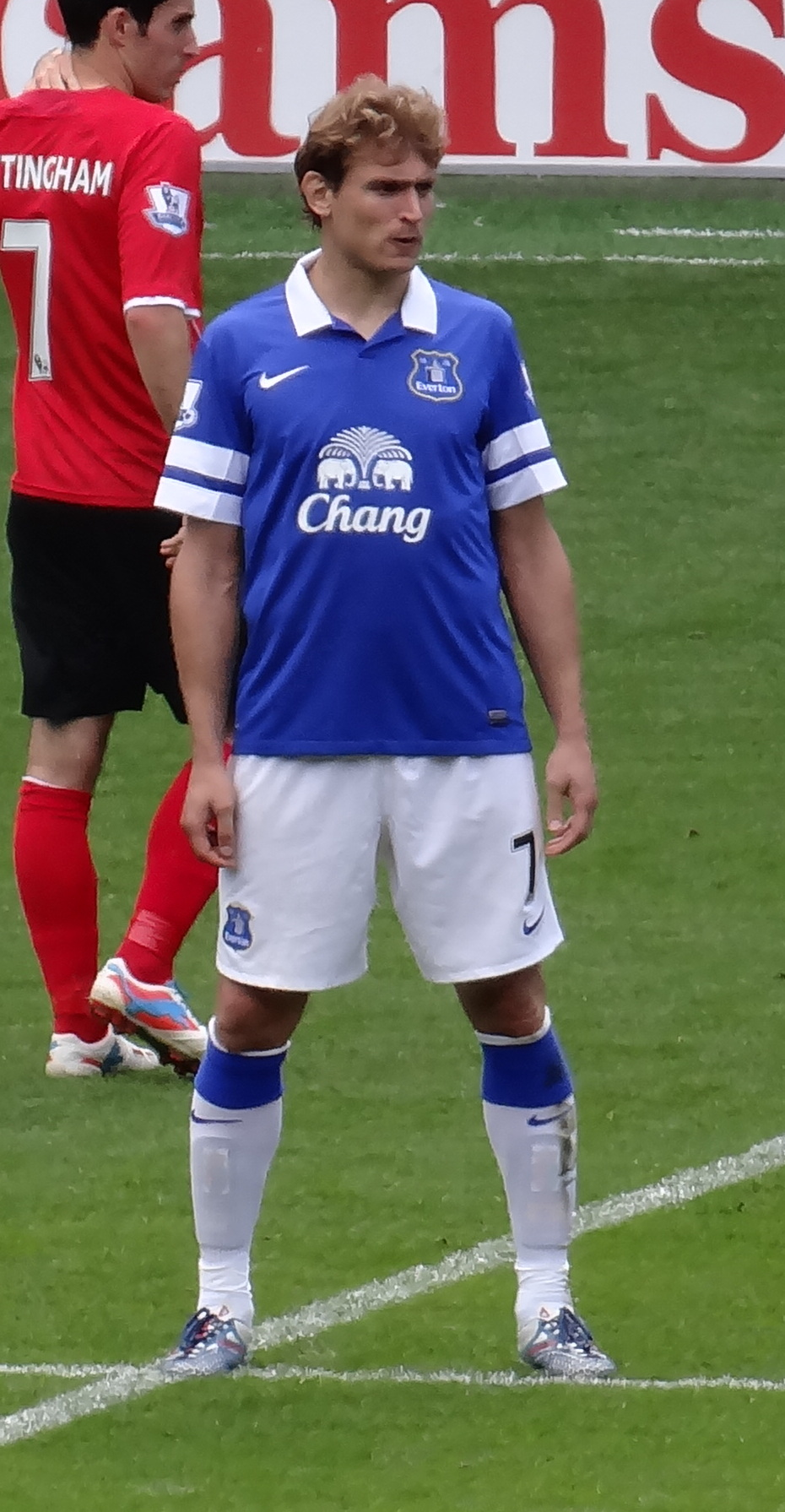
Nikica Jelavić is the highest scoring Croatian in Premier League history

- Aljoša Asanović – Derby County
- Slaven Bilić – West Ham United
- Igor Bišćan – Liverpool
- Alen Bokšić – Middlesbrough
- Duje Ćaleta-Car – Southampton
- Vedran Ćorluka – Manchester City, Tottenham Hotspur
- Eduardo – Arsenal
- **Joško Gvardiol** – **Manchester City**
- Nikica Jelavić – Everton, Hull City, West Ham United (29)
- Nikola Kalinić – Blackburn Rovers
- Ivan Klasnić – Bolton Wanderers
- Mateo Kovačić – Chelsea, Manchester City
- Andrej Kramarić – Leicester City
- Niko Kranjčar – Portsmouth, Tottenham Hotspur
- Dejan Lovren – Southampton, Liverpool
- Luka Modrić – Tottenham Hotspur
- Ivica Mornar – Portsmouth
- Ivan Perišić – Tottenham Hotspur
- Mladen Petrić – Fulham
- Mario Stanić – Chelsea
- Igor Štimac – Derby County, West Ham United
- Davor Šuker – Arsenal, West Ham United
- Nikola Vlašić – West Ham United
- **Luka Vušković** – **Brighton & Hove Albion**

== Cuba ==
- Onel Hernández – Norwich City (1)

== Curaçao ==
- Vurnon Anita – Newcastle United
- Juninho Bacuna – Huddersfield Town
- Leandro Bacuna – Aston Villa (6)
- Tahith Chong – Luton Town
- Jürgen Locadia – Brighton & Hove Albion
- Cuco Martina – Southampton

== Cyprus ==
- Marcus Edwards – Burnley (1)

== Czech Republic ==
- Milan Baroš – Liverpool, Aston Villa
- Roman Bednář – West Bromwich Albion
- Patrik Berger – Liverpool, Portsmouth, Aston Villa
- Jiří Jarošík – Birmingham City
- Libor Kozák – Aston Villa
- Ladislav Krejčí – Wolverhampton Wanderers
- Marek Matějovský – Reading
- Karel Poborský – Manchester United
- Tomáš Rosický – Arsenal
- Vladimír Šmicer – Liverpool
- Tomáš Souček – West Ham United (41)
- Matěj Vydra – West Bromwich Albion, Burnley
- Radoslav Kováč – West Ham United

== Denmark ==
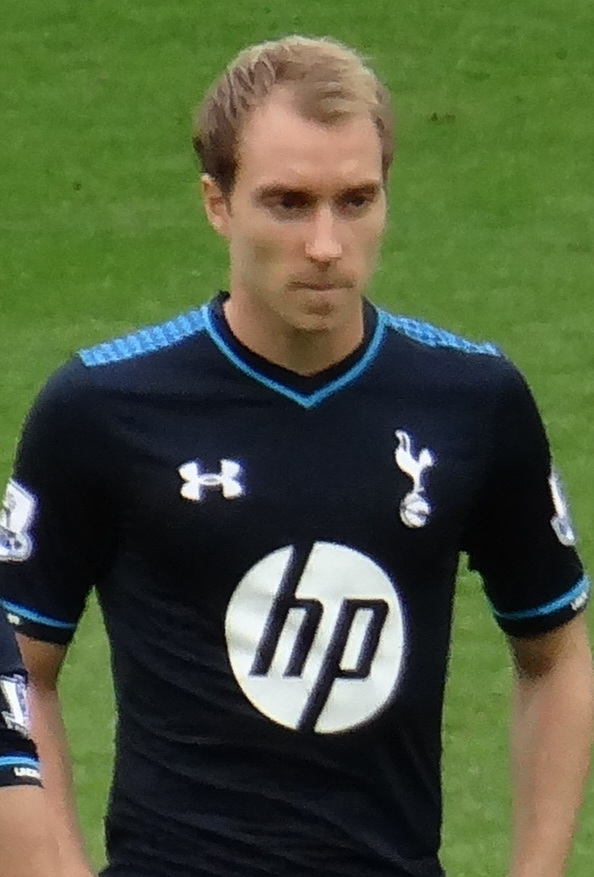
Christian Eriksen is the highest scoring Dane in Premier League history

- Daniel Agger – Liverpool
- Martin Albrechtsen – West Bromwich Albion
- Joachim Andersen – Fulham, Crystal Palace
- Mads Juel Andersen – Luton Town
- Mikkel Beck – Middlesbrough, Derby County
- Nicklas Bendtner – Arsenal, Sunderland
- Philip Billing – Huddersfield Town, Bournemouth
- Jacob Bruun Larsen – Burnley
- Mikkel Damsgaard – Brentford
- **Patrick Dorgu** – **Manchester United**
- Ronnie Ekelund – Southampton
- Christian Eriksen – Tottenham Hotspur, Brentford, Manchester United (55)
- Per Frandsen – Bolton Wanderers
- Thomas Gaardsøe – Ipswich Town
- Bjarne Goldbæk – Chelsea, Fulham
- Thomas Gravesen – Everton
- Jesper Grønkjær – Chelsea
- Bo Hansen – Bolton Wanderers
- Pierre-Emile Højbjerg – Southampton, Tottenham Hotspur
- Rasmus Højlund – Manchester United
- Claus Jensen – Charlton Athletic, Fulham
- John Jensen – Arsenal
- Mathias Jensen – Brentford
- Niclas Jensen – Manchester City
- Michael Johansen – Bolton Wanderers
- Mathias Jørgensen – Huddersfield Town, Brentford
- Jakob Kjeldbjerg – Chelsea
- Rasmus Kristensen – Leeds United
- Jacob Laursen – Derby County
- Martin Laursen – Aston Villa
- Jores Okore – Aston Villa
- Matt O'Riley – Brighton & Hove Albion
- **William Osula** – **Newcastle United**
- Peter Løvenkrands – Newcastle United
- Jan Mølby – Liverpool
- Allan Nielsen – Tottenham Hotspur
- Christian Nørgaard – Brentford
- Henrik Pedersen – Bolton Wanderers
- Per Pedersen – Blackburn Rovers
- Marc Rieper – West Ham United
- Mads Roerslev – Brentford
- Dennis Rommedahl – Charlton Athletic
- Peter Schmeichel – Aston Villa
- Claus Thomsen – Ipswich Town, Everton
- Jon Dahl Tomasson – Newcastle United
- Jannik Vestergaard – Southampton
- Kenneth Zohore – Cardiff City

== Dominican Republic ==
- Junior Firpo – Leeds United (1)

== DR Congo (Democratic Republic of the Congo) ==
- Benik Afobe – Bournemouth
- Yannick Bolasie – Crystal Palace, Everton
- Grady Diangana – West Bromwich Albion
- Giannelli Imbula – Stoke City
- Elias Kachunga – Huddersfield Town
- Gaël Kakuta – Fulham
- Lomana LuaLua – Newcastle United, Portsmouth
- Arthur Masuaku – West Ham United
- Dieumerci Mbokani – Norwich City
- Youssouf Mulumbu – West Bromwich Albion
- Michel Ngonge – Watford
- Shabani Nonda – Blackburn Rovers
- Axel Tuanzebe – Burnley
- Aaron Wan-Bissaka – Manchester United, West Ham United
- **Yoane Wissa** – Brentford, **Newcastle United** (47)

== Ecuador ==
- **Nilson Angulo** – **Sunderland**
- Christian Benítez – Birmingham City
- Felipe Caicedo – Manchester City
- Moisés Caicedo – Brighton & Hove Albion, Chelsea
- Ulises de la Cruz – Aston Villa, Reading
- Agustín Delgado – Southampton
- Pervis Estupiñán – Brighton & Hove Albion
- Piero Hincapié – Arsenal
- Antonio Valencia – Wigan Athletic, Manchester United (24)
- Enner Valencia – West Ham United, Everton

== Egypt ==
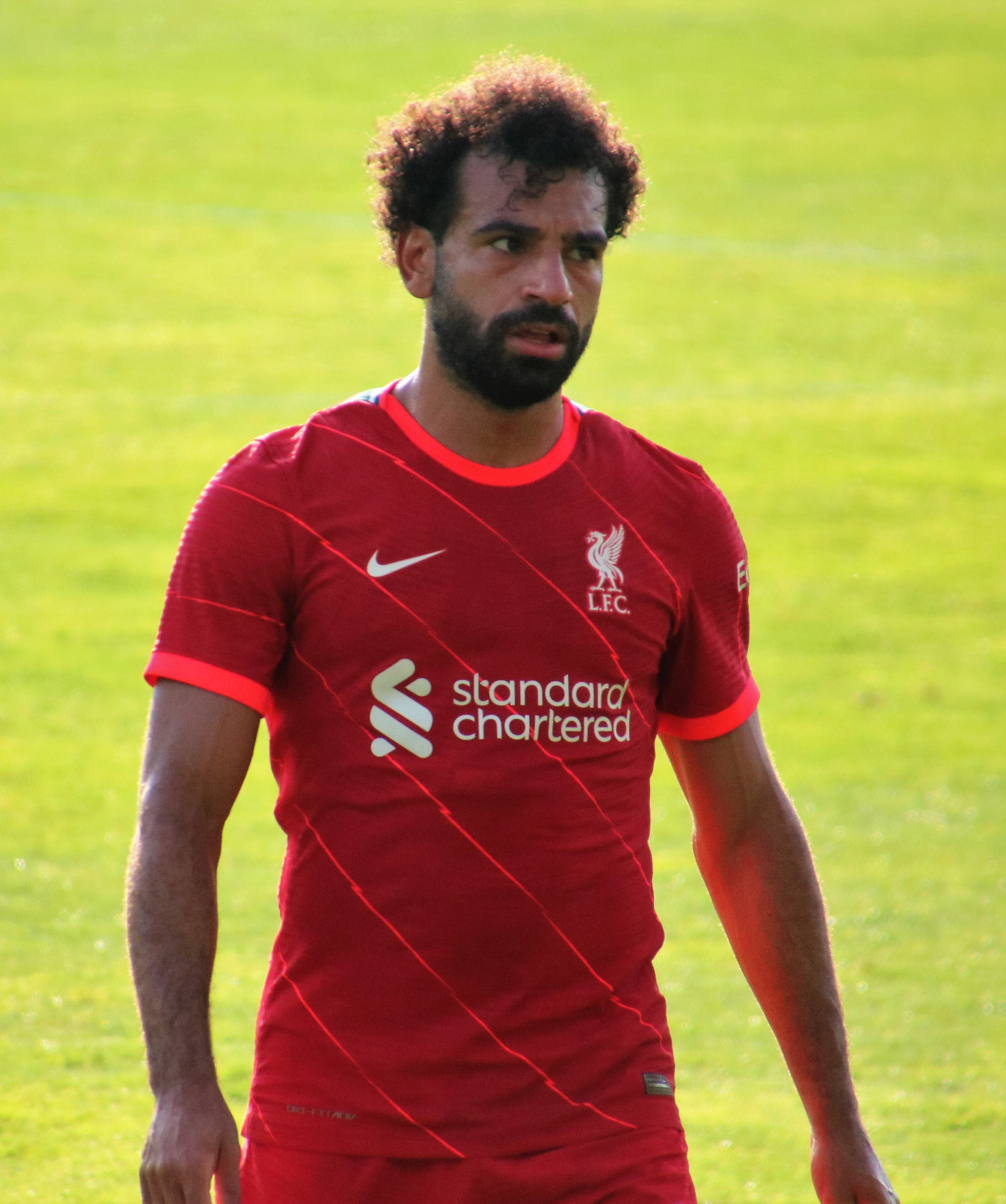
Mohamed Salah is the highest scoring foreign player in Premier League history

- Ahmed Elmohamady – Sunderland, Hull City, Aston Villa
- Mohamed Elneny – Arsenal
- Hossam Ghaly – Tottenham Hotspur
- Ahmed Hegazi – West Bromwich Albion
- **Omar Marmoush** – Manchester City, **Tottenham Hotspur**
- Mido – Tottenham Hotspur, Middlesbrough, Wigan Athletic
- Sam Morsy – Ipswich Town
- Mohamed Salah – Chelsea, Liverpool (193)
- Ramadan Sobhi – Stoke City
- Trézéguet – Aston Villa
- Amr Zaki – Wigan Athletic

== Equatorial Guinea ==
- Pedro Obiang – West Ham United (3)

== Estonia ==
- Ragnar Klavan – Liverpool (1)

== Finland ==
- Mikael Forssell – Chelsea, Birmingham City (34)
- Sami Hyypiä – Liverpool
- Jonatan Johansson – Charlton Athletic
- Joonas Kolkka – Crystal Palace
- Shefki Kuqi – Blackburn Rovers
- Jari Litmanen – Liverpool
- Mixu Paatelainen – Bolton Wanderers
- Teemu Pukki – Norwich City
- Aki Riihilahti – Crystal Palace
- Teemu Tainio – Tottenham Hotspur

== France ==
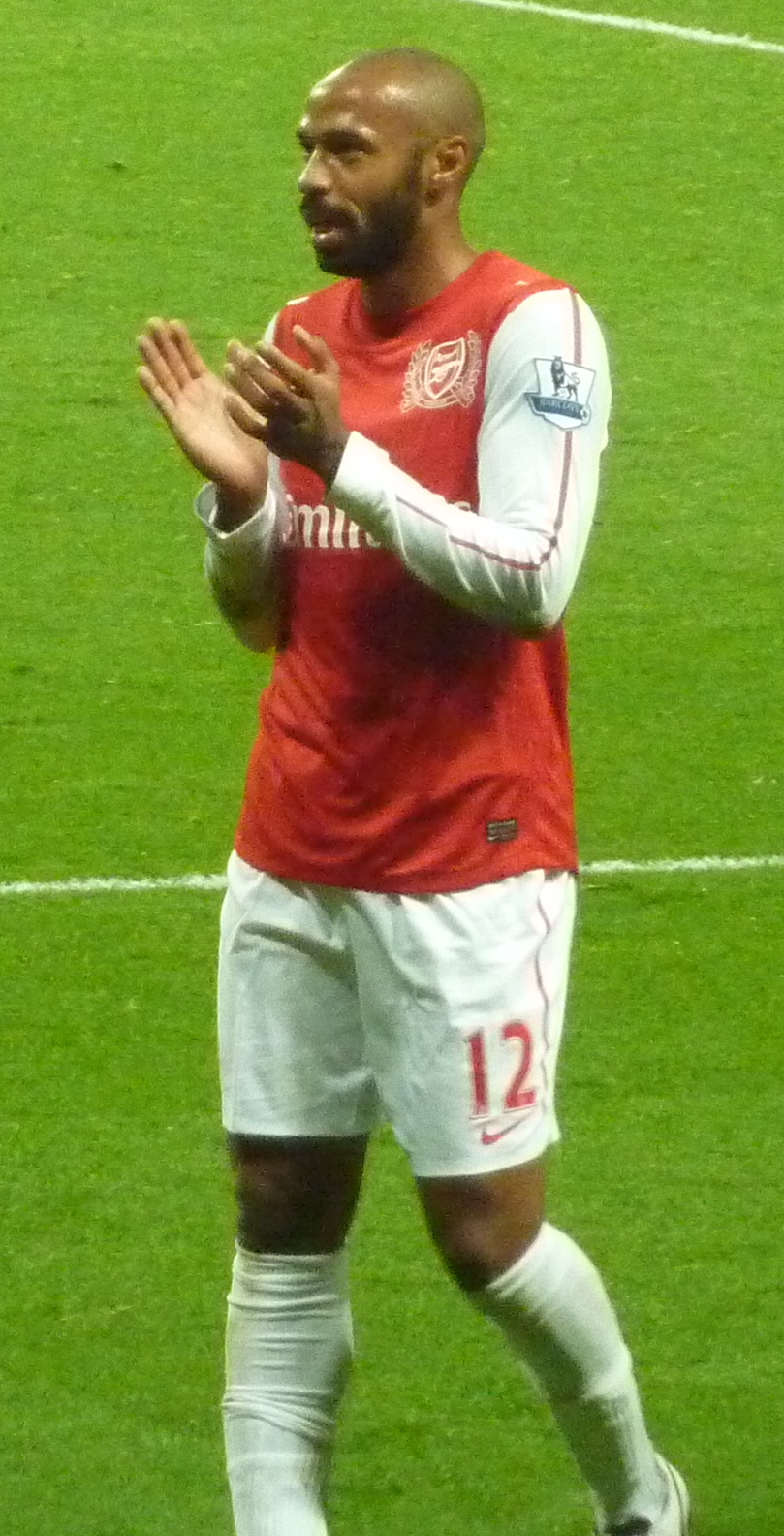
Thierry Henry scored 175 Premier League goals, all for Arsenal

- Samassi Abou – West Ham United
- Morgan Amalfitano – West Bromwich Albion, West Ham United
- Jérémie Aliadière – Arsenal, Middlesbrough
- Nicolas Anelka – Arsenal, Liverpool, Manchester City, Bolton Wanderers, Chelsea, West Bromwich Albion
- Lorenz Assignon – Burnley
- Benoît Badiashile – Chelsea
- Tiémoué Bakayoko – Chelsea
- **Thierno Barry** – **Everton**
- David Bellion – Sunderland, Manchester United
- Hatem Ben Arfa – Newcastle United
- Olivier Bernard – Newcastle United
- Laurent Blanc – Manchester United
- Thierry Bonalair – Nottingham Forest
- Yohan Cabaye – Newcastle United, Crystal Palace
- Rémy Cabella – Newcastle United
- Zoumana Camara – Leeds United
- Eric Cantona – Leeds United, Manchester United
- Étienne Capoue – Tottenham Hotspur, Watford
- Patrice Carteron – Sunderland
- Laurent Charvet – Chelsea, Newcastle United, Manchester City
- **Sidiki Cherif** – **Coventry City**
- **Rayan Cherki** – **Manchester City**
- Bruno Cheyrou – Liverpool
- Pascal Chimbonda – Wigan Athletic, Tottenham Hotspur, Blackburn Rovers
- **Mohamed-Ali Cho** – **Hull City**
- Philippe Christanval – Fulham
- Djibril Cissé – Liverpool, Sunderland, Queens Park Rangers
- Édouard Cissé – West Ham United
- Gaël Clichy – Arsenal, Manchester City
- Patrick Colleter – Southampton
- Pascal Cygan – Arsenal
- Olivier Dacourt – Everton, Leeds United
- Stéphane Dalmat – Tottenham Hotspur
- Jean-Claude Darcheville – Nottingham Forest
- Mathieu Debuchy – Newcastle United, Arsenal
- Marcel Desailly – Chelsea
- Abou Diaby – Arsenal
- Moussa Diaby – Aston Villa
- Lassana Diarra – Portsmouth
- Lucas Digne – Everton, Aston Villa
- Axel Disasi – Chelsea
- Sylvain Distin – Everton, Manchester City, Newcastle United
- Martin Djetou – Fulham
- Youri Djorkaeff – Bolton Wanderers
- Didier Domi – Newcastle United
- Christophe Dugarry – Birmingham City
- Patrice Evra – Manchester United
- Odsonne Édouard – Crystal Palace
- Hugo Ekitike – Liverpool
- Julien Faubert – West Ham United
- Fabrice Fernandes – Southampton
- Mathieu Flamini – Arsenal
- Wesley Fofana – Chelsea
- Marc-Antoine Fortuné – West Bromwich Albion
- William Gallas – Chelsea, Arsenal, Tottenham Hotspur
- David Ginola – Newcastle United, Tottenham Hotspur, Aston Villa
- Olivier Giroud – Arsenal, Chelsea
- Gaël Givet – Blackburn Rovers
- Alain Goma – Newcastle United
- Bafétimbi Gomis – Swansea City
- Yoan Gouffran – Newcastle United
- Elliot Grandin – Blackpool
- Xavier Gravelaine – Watford
- Léandre Griffit – Southampton
- Gilles Grimandi – Arsenal
- Stéphane Guivarc'h – Newcastle United
- Malo Gusto – Chelsea
- Thierry Henry – Arsenal (175)
- Younès Kaboul – Tottenham Hotspur, Portsmouth, Watford
- Boubacar Kamara – Aston Villa
- N'Golo Kanté – Leicester City, Chelsea
- Olivier Kapo – Birmingham City, Wigan Athletic
- Christian Karembeu – Middlesbrough
- Anthony Knockaert – Brighton & Hove Albion
- Randal Kolo Muani – Tottenham Hotspur
- Ibrahima Konaté – Liverpool
- Laurent Koscielny – Arsenal
- Eli Junior Kroupi – Bournemouth
- Alexandre Lacazette – Arsenal
- Maxence Lacroix – Crystal Palace
- Bernard Lambourde – Chelsea
- **Enzo Le Fée** – **Sunderland**
- Anthony Le Tallec – Sunderland
- Frank Leboeuf – Chelsea
- Pierre Lees-Melou – Norwich City
- Sylvain Legwinski – Fulham
- Florian Lejeune – Newcastle United
- Mickaël Madar – Everton
- Soungoutou Magassa – West Ham United
- Claude Makélélé – Chelsea
- Steed Malbranque – Fulham, Tottenham Hotspur, Sunderland
- Florent Malouda – Chelsea
- Sékou Mara – Southampton
- Steve Marlet – Fulham
- Anthony Martial – Manchester United
- Sylvain Marveaux – Newcastle United
- Jean-Philippe Mateta – Crystal Palace
- Neal Maupay – Brighton & Hove Albion, Everton, Brentford
- Youl Mawéné – Derby County
- Benjamin Mendy – Manchester City
- Bernard Mendy – Hull City
- Lys Mousset – Bournemouth, Sheffield United
- Steven Mouyokolo – Hull City
- Nordi Mukiele – Sunderland
- Yann M'Vila – Sunderland
- Christian Nadé – Sheffield United
- Lilian Nalis – Leicester City
- Samir Nasri – Arsenal, Manchester City
- Tanguy Ndombele – Tottenham Hotspur
- David Ngog – Liverpool, Bolton Wanderers
- Bruno Ngotty – Bolton Wanderers
- Christopher Nkunku – Chelsea
- Charles N'Zogbia – Newcastle United, Wigan Athletic, Aston Villa
- Steven Nzonzi – Blackburn Rovers, Stoke City
- Gabriel Obertan – Newcastle United
- Wilson Odobert – Burnley, Tottenham Hotspur
- Michael Olise – Crystal Palace
- Noé Pamarot – Tottenham Hotspur, Portsmouth
- Dimitri Payet – West Ham United
- Sébastien Pérez – Blackburn Rovers
- Romain Perraud – Southampton
- Emmanuel Petit – Arsenal, Chelsea
- Frédéric Piquionne – Portsmouth, West Ham United
- Robert Pires – Arsenal
- Paul Pogba – Manchester United
- Sébastien Puygrenier – Bolton Wanderers
- Franck Queudrue – Middlesbrough, Fulham
- Loïc Rémy – Queens Park Rangers, Newcastle United, Chelsea
- Laurent Robert – Newcastle United, Portsmouth
- Georginio Rutter – Brighton & Hove Albion
- Bacary Sagna – Arsenal
- Louis Saha – Newcastle United, Fulham, Manchester United, Everton, Tottenham Hotspur
- Allan Saint-Maximin – Newcastle United
- Mamadou Sakho – Liverpool, Crystal Palace
- William Saliba – Arsenal
- Sébastien Schemmel – West Ham United
- Morgan Schneiderlin – Southampton, Manchester United, Everton
- Antoine Sibierski – Manchester City, Newcastle United, Wigan Athletic
- Mikaël Silvestre – Manchester United, Arsenal
- Florent Sinama Pongolle – Liverpool, Blackburn Rovers
- Moussa Sissoko – Newcastle United, Tottenham Hotspur, Watford
- David Sommeil – Manchester City
- Sébastien Squillaci – Arsenal
- Loum Tchaouna – Burnley
- **Mathys Tel** – **Tottenham Hotspur**
- Adrien Truffert – Bournemouth
- Lesley Ugochukwu – Southampton, Burnley
- Raphaël Varane – Manchester United
- Patrick Vieira – Arsenal, Manchester City
- Sylvain Wiltord – Arsenal
- Kurt Zouma – Chelsea, Stoke City, Everton, West Ham United
- Ronald Zubar – Wolverhampton Wanderers

== Gabon ==
- Pierre-Emerick Aubameyang – Arsenal, Chelsea (69)
- Daniel Cousin – Hull City
- Mario Lemina – Southampton, Fulham, Wolverhampton Wanderers
- Didier Ndong – Sunderland

== Gambia (The Gambia) ==
- Modou Barrow – Swansea City
- Yankuba Minteh – Brighton & Hove Albion (9)

== Georgia (Georgia (country)) ==
- Mikhail Kavelashvili – Manchester City
- Temur Ketsbaia – Newcastle United (8)
- Zurab Khizanishvili – Blackburn Rovers
- Georgi Kinkladze – Manchester City, Derby County

== Germany ==
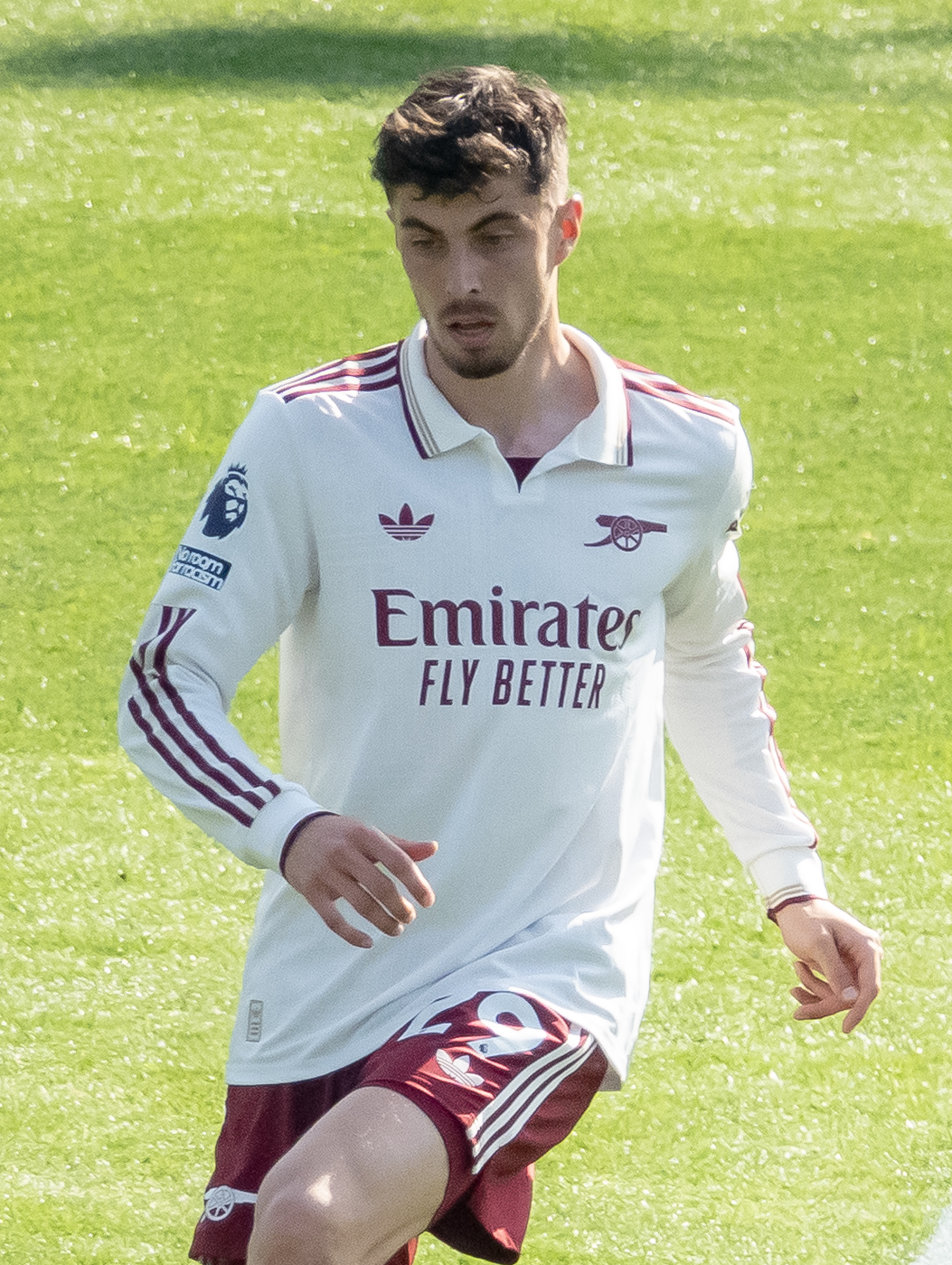
Kai Havertz is the highest scoring German in Premier League history

- Markus Babbel – Liverpool, Blackburn Rovers
- Michael Ballack – Chelsea
- Stefan Beinlich – Aston Villa
- Fredi Bobic – Bolton Wanderers
- Emre Can – Liverpool
- Niclas Füllkrug – West Ham United
- Maurizio Gaudino – Manchester City
- Serge Gnabry – Arsenal
- **Leon Goretzka** – **Aston Villa**
- **Pascal Groß** – **Brighton & Hove Albion**
- Brajan Gruda – Brighton & Hove Albion
- İlkay Gündoğan – Manchester City
- Dietmar Hamann – Newcastle United, Liverpool, Manchester City
- **Kai Havertz** – Chelsea, **Arsenal** (46)
- Thomas Hitzlsperger – Aston Villa, West Ham United, Everton
- Lewis Holtby – Tottenham Hotspur, Fulham
- Robert Huth – Middlesbrough, Stoke City, Leicester City
- **Vitaly Janelt** – **Brentford**
- Steffen Karl – Manchester City
- Jürgen Klinsmann – Tottenham Hotspur
- Stefan Malz – Arsenal
- Marko Marin – Chelsea
- Per Mertesacker – Arsenal
- Max Meyer – Crystal Palace
- Shkodran Mustafi – Arsenal
- Lukas Nmecha – Leeds United
- Mesut Özil – Arsenal
- Lukas Podolski – Arsenal
- Karl-Heinz Riedle – Liverpool
- Sascha Riether – Fulham
- Merlin Röhl – Everton
- Uwe Rösler – Manchester City
- Antonio Rüdiger – Chelsea
- Leroy Sané – Manchester City
- **Kevin Schade** – **Brentford**
- Christopher Schindler – Huddersfield Town
- Stefan Schnoor – Derby County
- André Schürrle – Chelsea, Fulham
- Bastian Schweinsteiger – Manchester United
- Dennis Srbeny – Norwich City
- **Anton Stach** – **Leeds United**
- Michael Tarnat – Manchester City
- **Malick Thiaw** – **Newcastle United**
- Deniz Undav – Brighton & Hove Albion
- Moritz Volz – Fulham
- Timo Werner – Chelsea, Tottenham Hotspur
- **Florian Wirtz** – **Liverpool**
- Nick Woltemade – Newcastle United
- Christian Ziege – Middlesbrough, Liverpool, Tottenham Hotspur

== Ghana ==
- Daniel Amartey – Leicester City
- Christian Atsu – Newcastle United
- André Ayew – Swansea City, West Ham United
- Jordan Ayew – Aston Villa, Swansea City, Crystal Palace, Leicester City (42)
- Kevin-Prince Boateng – Portsmouth
- Michael Essien – Chelsea
- Asamoah Gyan – Sunderland
- Mohammed Kudus – West Ham United, Tottenham Hotspur
- Tariq Lamptey – Brighton & Hove Albion
- John Mensah – Sunderland
- Sulley Muntari – Portsmouth
- Alex Nyarko – Everton
- Thomas Partey – Arsenal
- **Antoine Semenyo** – Bournemouth, **Manchester City**
- Jeffrey Schlupp – Leicester City, Crystal Palace
- Kamaldeen Sulemana – Southampton
- Tony Yeboah – Leeds United

== Gibraltar ==
- Danny Higginbotham – Derby County, Southampton, Sunderland, Stoke City (9)

== Greece ==
- George Baldock – Sheffield United
- Nikos Dabizas – Newcastle United
- Georgios Donis – Blackburn Rovers
- Stelios Giannakopoulos – Bolton Wanderers (20)
- José Holebas – Watford
- Giorgos Karagounis – Fulham
- **Charalampos Kostoulas** – **Brighton & Hove Albion**
- Sotirios Kyrgiakos – Liverpool
- Konstantinos Mavropanos – West Ham United
- Sokratis Papastathopoulos – Arsenal
- Georgios Samaras – Manchester City
- Stefanos Tzimas – Brighton & Hove Albion
- Apostolos Vellios – Everton
- Theodoros Zagorakis – Leicester City

== Grenada ==
- Shandon Baptiste – Brentford
- Delroy Facey – Bolton Wanderers
- Jason Roberts – West Bromwich Albion, Portsmouth, Wigan Athletic, Blackburn Rovers (36)

== Guatemala ==
- Nathaniel Mendez-Laing – Cardiff City (4)

== Guinea ==
- Titi Camara – Liverpool (9)
- Naby Keïta – Liverpool
- Kamil Zayatte – Hull City

== Guinea-Bissau ==
- Beto – Everton (20)

== Guyana ==
- Carl Cort – Wimbledon, Newcastle United, Wolverhampton Wanderers (28)

== Haiti ==
- Jean-Ricner Bellegarde – Wolverhampton Wanderers
- **Wilson Isidor** – **Sunderland** (7)

== Honduras ==
- Roger Espinoza – Wigan Athletic
- Maynor Figueroa – Wigan Athletic (4)
- Wilson Palacios – Tottenham Hotspur

== Hungary ==
- Ákos Buzsáky – Queens Park Rangers
- Zoltán Gera – West Bromwich Albion, Fulham (17)
- Milos Kerkez – Bournemouth, Liverpool
- Tamás Priskin – Watford
- **Dominik Szoboszlai** – **Liverpool** (17)

== Iceland ==
- Guðni Bergsson – Tottenham Hotspur, Bolton Wanderers
- Eiður Guðjohnsen – Chelsea, Tottenham Hotspur
- Joey Guðjónsson – Aston Villa
- Þórður Guðjónsson – Derby County
- Jóhann Berg Guðmundsson – Burnley
- Aron Gunnarsson – Cardiff City
- Brynjar Gunnarsson – Reading
- Arnar Gunnlaugsson – Leicester City
- Heiðar Helguson – Watford, Fulham, Bolton Wanderers, Queens Park Rangers
- Hermann Hreiðarsson – Crystal Palace, Wimbledon, Ipswich Town, Charlton Athletic, Portsmouth
- Ívar Ingimarsson – Reading
- Þorvaldur Örlygsson – Nottingham Forest
- Gylfi Sigurðsson – Swansea City, Tottenham Hotspur, Everton (67)
- Grétar Steinsson – Bolton Wanderers

== Iran ==
- Ashkan Dejagah – Fulham (5)
- Saman Ghoddos – Brentford
- Alireza Jahanbakhsh – Brighton & Hove Albion
- Andranik Teymourian – Bolton Wanderers

== Israel ==
- Walid Badir – Wimbledon
- Yossi Benayoun – West Ham United, Liverpool, Chelsea, Arsenal (31)
- Tal Ben Haim – Bolton Wanderers
- Eyal Berkovic – Southampton, West Ham United, Manchester City, Portsmouth
- Tamir Cohen – Bolton Wanderers
- Tomer Hemed – Brighton & Hove Albion
- Beram Kayal – Brighton & Hove Albion
- **Anan Khalaili** – **Crystal Palace**
- Avi Nimni – Derby County
- Ronny Rosenthal – Liverpool, Tottenham Hotspur
- Itay Shechter – Swansea City
- Manor Solomon – Fulham
- Idan Tal – Everton

== Italy ==
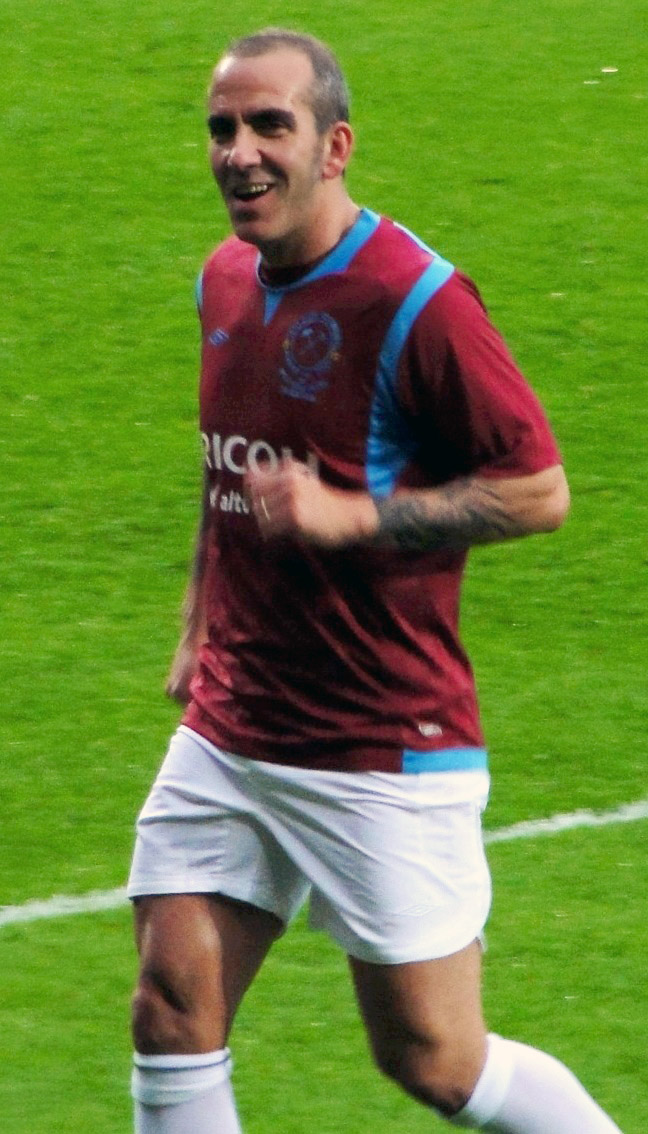
Paolo Di Canio is the highest scoring Italian in Premier League history

- Lorenzo Amoruso – Blackburn Rovers
- Alberto Aquilani – Liverpool
- Dino Baggio – Blackburn Rovers
- Francesco Baiano – Derby County
- Mario Balotelli – Manchester City, Liverpool
- Nicola Berti – Tottenham Hotspur
- Rolando Bianchi – Manchester City
- Fabio Borini – Liverpool, Sunderland
- **Riccardo Calafiori** – **Arsenal**
- Benito Carbone – Sheffield Wednesday, Aston Villa, Bradford City, Derby County, Middlesbrough
- Pierluigi Casiraghi – Chelsea
- Federico Chiesa – Liverpool
- Bernardo Corradi – Manchester City
- Patrick Cutrone – Wolverhampton Wanderers
- Samuele Dalla Bona – Chelsea
- Matteo Darmian – Manchester United
- Paolo Di Canio – Sheffield Wednesday, West Ham United, Charlton Athletic (66)
- Roberto Di Matteo – Chelsea
- David Di Michele – West Ham United
- Alessandro Diamanti – West Ham United
- Andrea Dossena – Liverpool
- Emerson – West Ham United
- Stefano Eranio – Derby County
- Gianluca Festa – Middlesbrough
- Manolo Gabbiadini – Southampton
- Emanuele Giaccherini – Sunderland
- Wilfried Gnonto – Leeds United
- Corrado Grabbi – Blackburn Rovers
- Jorginho – Chelsea
- **Michael Kayode** – **Brentford**
- Moise Kean – Everton
- Luca Koleosho – Burnley
- Attilio Lombardo – Crystal Palace
- Lorenzo Lucca – Nottingham Forest
- Massimo Maccarone – Middlesbrough
- Federico Macheda – Manchester United
- Dario Marcolin – Blackburn Rovers
- Marco Materazzi – Everton
- Vincenzo Montella – Fulham
- Angelo Ogbonna – West Ham United
- Stefano Okaka – Fulham, Watford
- Caleb Okoli – Leicester City
- Dani Osvaldo – Southampton
- Alberto Paloschi – Swansea City
- Graziano Pellè – Southampton
- Alessandro Pistone – Newcastle United, Everton
- Andrea Ranocchia – Hull City
- Fabrizio Ravanelli – Middlesbrough, Derby County
- Giuseppe Rossi – Manchester United
- Francesco Sanetti – Sheffield Wednesday
- Davide Santon – Newcastle United
- Nicolò Savona – Nottingham Forest
- Gianluca Scamacca – West Ham United
- Sandro Tonali – Newcastle United
- Destiny Udogie – Tottenham Hotspur
- Nicola Ventola – Crystal Palace
- Gianluca Vialli – Chelsea
- Nicolò Zaniolo – Aston Villa
- Davide Zappacosta – Chelsea
- Gianfranco Zola – Chelsea

== Ivory Coast ==
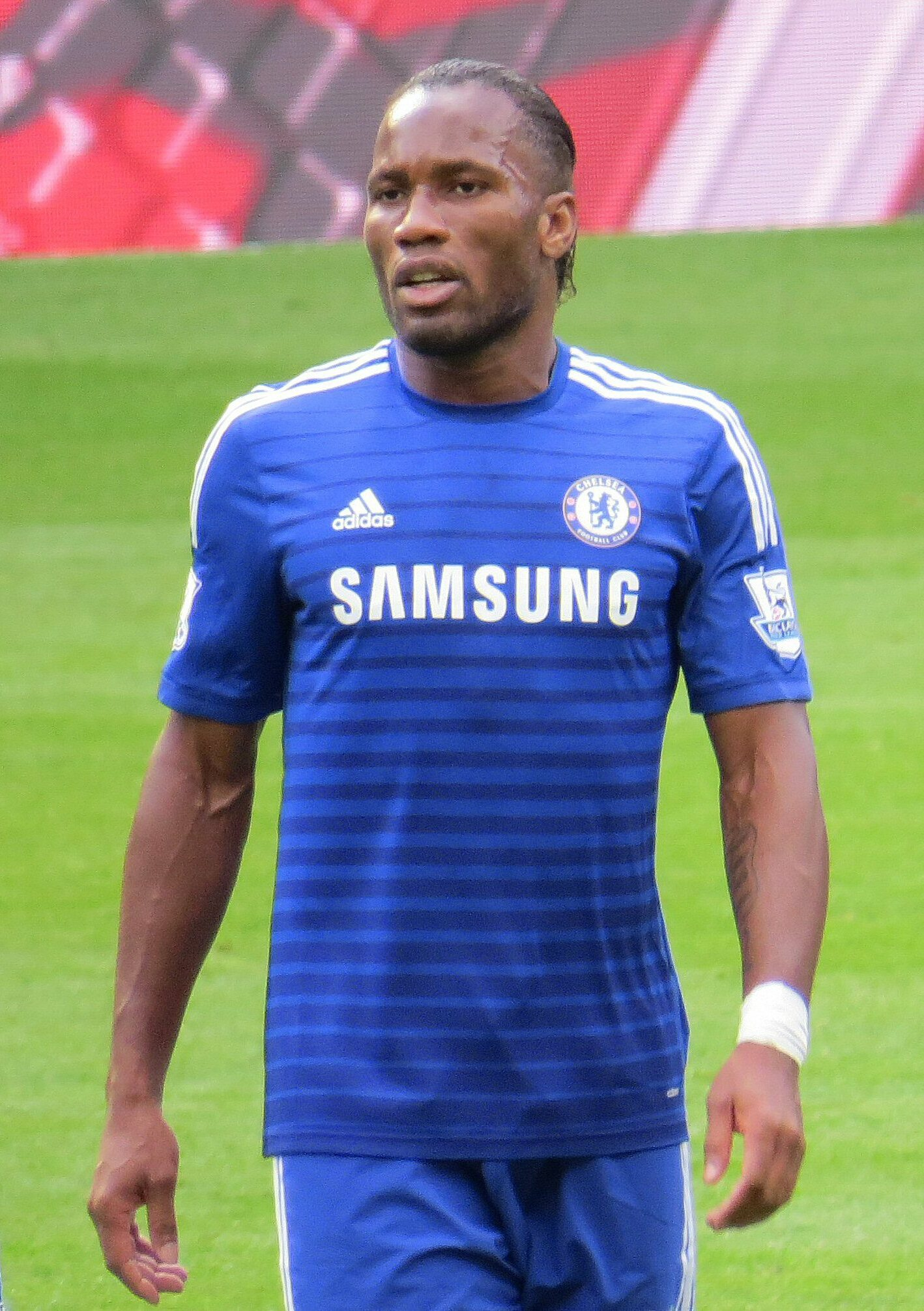
Didier Drogba scored 104 Premier League goals, all for Chelsea

- Simon Adingra – Brighton & Hove Albion, Sunderland
- Emmanuel Agbadou – Wolverhampton Wanderers
- Serge Aurier – Tottenham Hotspur, Nottingham Forest
- Eric Bailly – Manchester United
- Ibrahima Bakayoko – Everton
- Sol Bamba – Cardiff City
- Willy Boly – Wolverhampton Wanderers, Nottingham Forest
- Wilfried Bony – Swansea City, Manchester City, Stoke City
- Maxwel Cornet – Burnley, West Ham United
- Guy Demel – West Ham United
- Amad Diallo – Manchester United
- Aruna Dindane – Portsmouth
- Didier Drogba – Chelsea (104)
- Emmanuel Eboué – Arsenal
- David Datro Fofana – Burnley
- **Yann Gboho** – **Coventry City**
- Gervinho – Arsenal
- Steve Gohouri – Wigan Athletic
- Max Gradel – Bournemouth
- Evann Guessand – Crystal Palace
- Sébastien Haller – West Ham United
- Salomon Kalou – Chelsea
- Hassane Kamara – Watford
- Arouna Koné – Wigan Athletic, Everton
- Lamine Koné – Sunderland
- **Abdoul Ouattara** – **Ipswich Town**
- Nicolas Pépé – Arsenal
- Yannick Sagbo – Hull City
- Ibrahim Sangaré – Nottingham Forest
- Jean Michaël Seri – Fulham
- Cheick Tioté – Newcastle United
- **Bazoumana Touré** – **Newcastle United**
- Kolo Touré – Arsenal, Manchester City, Liverpool
- Yaya Touré – Manchester City
- **Malick Yalcouyé** – **Brighton & Hove Albion**
- Wilfried Zaha – Crystal Palace

== Jamaica ==
- Michail Antonio – West Ham United (68)
- Leon Bailey – Aston Villa
- Giles Barnes – Derby County
- Jermaine Beckford – Everton
- Trevor Benjamin – Leicester City
- Deon Burton – Derby County
- Bobby De Cordova-Reid – Cardiff City, Fulham, Leicester City
- Robbie Earle – Wimbledon
- Jason Euell – Wimbledon, Charlton Athletic
- Ricardo Fuller – Portsmouth, Stoke City
- Ricardo Gardner – Bolton Wanderers
- Marcus Gayle – Wimbledon
- Andre Gray – Burnley, Watford
- Demarai Gray – Leicester City, Everton
- Isaac Hayden – Newcastle United
- Barry Hayles – Fulham
- Rico Henry – Brentford
- Mason Holgate – Everton
- Micah Hyde – Watford
- Marlon King – Watford, Wigan Athletic, Hull City, Middlesbrough
- Jamie Lawrence – Leicester City, Bradford City
- Kevin Lisbie – Charlton Athletic
- Adrian Mariappa – Reading, Crystal Palace
- Darren Moore – West Bromwich Albion
- Wes Morgan – Leicester City
- Ravel Morrison – West Ham United
- Ethan Pinnock – Brentford
- Darryl Powell – Derby County
- Fitzroy Simpson – Manchester City
- Frank Sinclair – Chelsea, Leicester City

== Japan ==
- Wataru Endo – Liverpool
- Junichi Inamoto – Fulham
- Shinji Kagawa – Manchester United
- **Daichi Kamada** – **Crystal Palace**
- **Daizen Maeda** – **Ipswich Town**
- Takumi Minamino – Liverpool, Southampton
- Kaoru Mitoma – Brighton & Hove Albion (23)
- Yoshinori Muto – Newcastle United
- Hidetoshi Nakata – Bolton Wanderers
- Shinji Okazaki – Leicester City
- **Tatsuhiro Sakamoto** – **Coventry City**
- Yukinari Sugawara – Southampton
- Ao Tanaka – Leeds United
- Takehiro Tomiyasu – Arsenal
- Maya Yoshida – Southampton

== Kenya ==
- Victor Wanyama – Southampton, Tottenham Hotspur (10)

== Korea Republic (South Korea) ==
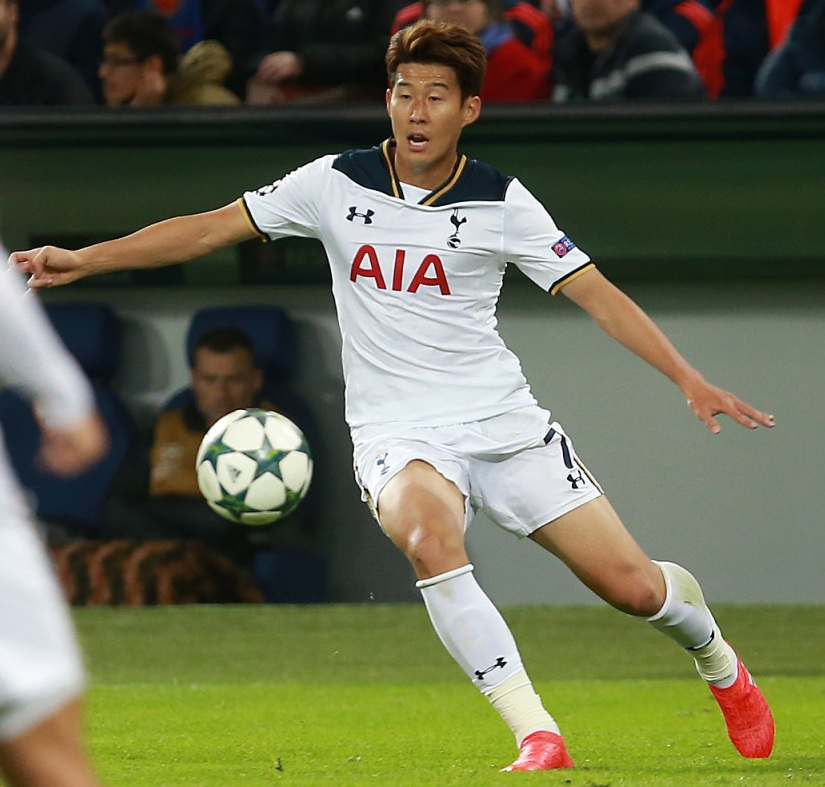
Son Heung-min is the highest scoring Asian in the Premier League

- Hwang Hee-chan – Wolverhampton Wanderers
- Ji Dong-won – Sunderland
- Ki Sung-yueng – Swansea City, Sunderland
- Kim Bo-kyung – Cardiff City
- Lee Chung-yong – Bolton Wanderers, Crystal Palace
- Park Ji-sung – Manchester United
- Seol Ki-hyeon – Reading, Fulham
- Son Heung-min – Tottenham Hotspur (127)

== Kosovo ==
- Milot Rashica – Norwich City (1)

== Latvia ==
- Kaspars Gorkšs – Reading
- Marians Pahars – Southampton (42)

== Liberia ==
- George Weah – Chelsea, Manchester City (4)
- Christopher Wreh – Arsenal

== Mali ==
- Yves Bissouma – Brighton & Hove Albion, Tottenham Hotspur
- Kalifa Cissé – Reading
- Samba Diakité – Queens Park Rangers
- Mahamadou Diarra – Fulham
- Moussa Djenepo – Southampton
- Abdoulaye Doucouré – Watford, Everton
- Frédéric Kanouté – West Ham United, Tottenham Hotspur (43)
- Jimmy Kébé – Reading
- Modibo Maïga – West Ham United
- Bakary Sako – Crystal Palace
- Mamady Sidibé – Stoke City
- Mohamed Sissoko – Liverpool
- Molla Wagué – Watford

== Mauritania ==
- Aboubakar Kamara – Fulham (3)

== Mexico ==
- Edson Álvarez – West Ham United
- Jared Borgetti – Bolton Wanderers
- Guillermo Franco – West Ham United
- Javier Hernández – Manchester United, West Ham United
- Raúl Jiménez – Wolverhampton Wanderers, Fulham (68)
- Miguel Layún – Watford
- Carlos Vela – Arsenal, West Bromwich Albion

== Montenegro ==
- Stevan Jovetić – Manchester City (8)
- Stefan Savić – Manchester City
- Simon Vukčević – Blackburn Rovers

== Montserrat ==
- Bruce Dyer – Crystal Palace
- Ruel Fox – Norwich City, Newcastle United, Tottenham Hotspur (36)

== Morocco ==
- **Amine Adli** – **Bournemouth**
- Nayef Aguerd – West Ham United
- Oussama Assaidi – Stoke City
- Sofiane Boufal – Southampton
- Marouane Chamakh – Arsenal, Crystal Palace
- Youssef Chippo – Coventry City
- Manuel da Costa – West Ham United
- Issa Diop – West Ham United, Fulham
- Karim El Ahmadi – Aston Villa
- Talal El Karkouri – Charlton Athletic
- Tahar El Khalej – Southampton
- Bilal El Khannouss – Leicester City
- Mustapha Hadji – Coventry City, Aston Villa
- Hassan Kachloul – Southampton, Aston Villa (16)
- Adam Masina – Watford
- Noureddine Naybet – Tottenham Hotspur
- Youssef Safri – Norwich City
- Romain Saïss – Wolverhampton Wanderers
- Adel Taarabt – Queens Park Rangers
- Chemsdine Talbi – Sunderland
- Hakim Ziyech – Chelsea

== Netherlands ==
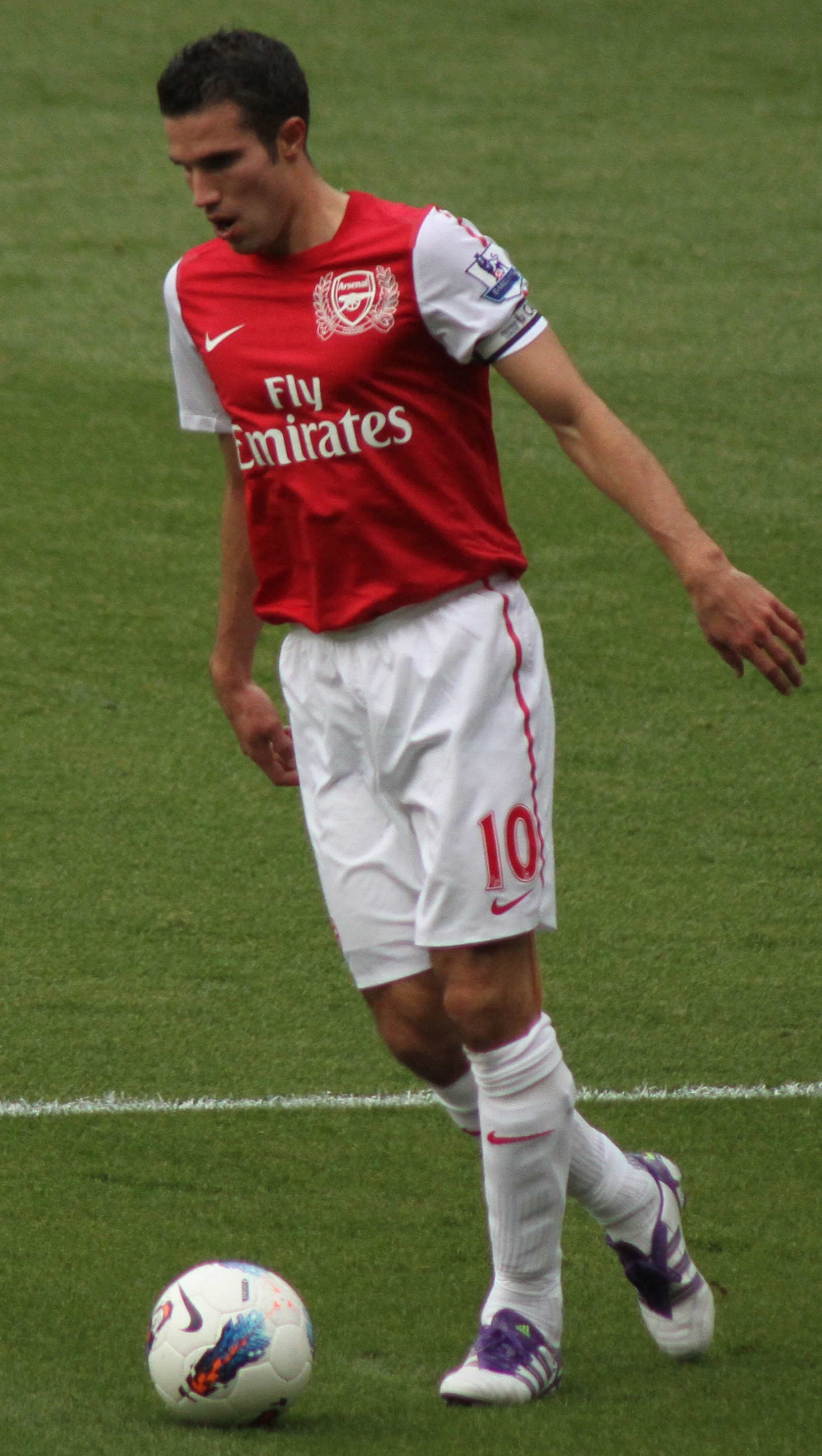
Robin van Persie is the highest scoring Dutchman in Premier League history, with 144 goals

- Patrick van Aanholt – Sunderland, Crystal Palace
- Ibrahim Afellay – Stoke City
- Nathan Aké – Watford, Bournemouth, Manchester City
- Ryan Babel – Liverpool, Fulham
- Donny van de Beek – Manchester United, Everton
- Dennis Bergkamp – Arsenal
- Steven Bergwijn – Tottenham Hotspur
- Daley Blind – Manchester United
- Regi Blinker – Sheffield Wednesday
- George Boateng – Coventry City, Aston Villa, Middlesbrough, Hull City
- Jeroen Boere – West Ham United
- Paul Bosvelt – Manchester City
- **Sven Botman** – **Newcastle United**
- Wilfred Bouma – Aston Villa
- **Brian Brobbey** – **Sunderland**
- Giovanni van Bronckhorst – Arsenal
- Alexander Büttner – Manchester United
- Jordy Clasie – Southampton
- Jordi Cruyff – Manchester United
- Arnaut Danjuma – Tottenham Hotspur, Everton
- Chris David – Fulham
- Edgar Davids – Tottenham Hotspur
- Memphis Depay – Manchester United
- Virgil van Dijk – Southampton, Liverpool
- Royston Drenthe – Everton
- Anwar El Ghazi – Aston Villa
- Eljero Elia – Southampton
- Urby Emanuelson – Fulham
- **Emmanuel Emegha** – **Chelsea**
- Marvin Emnes – Swansea City
- Leroy Fer – Norwich City, Queens Park Rangers, Swansea City
- **Zian Flemming** – Burnley, **Ipswich Town**
- Fabian de Freitas – Bolton Wanderers
- **Cody Gakpo** – **Liverpool**
- Ulrich van Gobbel – Southampton
- Ryan Gravenberch – Liverpool
- Ruud Gullit – Chelsea
- Jonathan de Guzmán – Swansea City
- Gustavo Hamer – Sheffield United
- Jimmy Floyd Hasselbaink – Leeds United, Chelsea, Middlesbrough, Charlton Athletic
- **Jan Paul van Hecke** – Brighton & Hove Albion, **Tottenham Hotspur**
- John Heitinga – Everton, Fulham
- Glenn Helder – Arsenal
- Pierre van Hooijdonk – Nottingham Forest
- Mike van der Hoorn – Swansea City
- Daryl Janmaat – Newcastle United, Watford
- Vincent Janssen – Tottenham Hotspur
- Collins John – Fulham
- Nigel de Jong – Manchester City
- Siem de Jong – Newcastle United
- Wim Jonk – Sheffield Wednesday
- **Justin Kluivert** – **Bournemouth**
- Patrick Kluivert – Newcastle United
- Terence Kongolo – Huddersfield Town
- Willem Korsten – Leeds United, Tottenham Hotspur
- Dirk Kuyt – Liverpool
- Robin van der Laan – Derby County
- Denny Landzaat – Wigan Athletic
- Rajiv van La Parra – Huddersfield Town
- Jeremain Lens – Sunderland
- Matthijs de Ligt – Manchester United
- Ian Maatsen – Aston Villa
- Donyell Malen – Aston Villa
- Bruno Martins Indi – Stoke City
- Mario Melchiot – Chelsea, Birmingham City
- Robert Molenaar – Leeds United, Bradford City
- Ken Monkou – Southampton
- Kiki Musampa – Manchester City
- Luciano Narsingh – Swansea City
- Luc Nijholt – Swindon Town
- Ruud van Nistelrooy – Manchester United
- André Ooijer – Blackburn Rovers
- Marc Overmars – Arsenal
- Robin van Persie – Arsenal, Manchester United (144)
- Erik Pieters – Stoke City
- Davy Pröpper – Brighton & Hove Albion
- Tijjani Reijnders – Manchester City
- Michael Reiziger – Middlesbrough
- Martijn Reuser – Ipswich Town
- Jaïro Riedewald – Crystal Palace
- Arjen Robben – Chelsea
- Marten de Roon – Middlesbrough
- Bryan Roy – Nottingham Forest
- Gerald Sibon – Sheffield Wednesday
- Xavi Simons – Tottenham Hotspur
- Richard Sneekes – Bolton Wanderers
- Jaap Stam – Manchester United
- Ronnie Stam – Wigan Athletic
- Pascal Struijk – Leeds United
- Crysencio Summerville – Leeds United, West Ham United
- Kenny Tete – Fulham
- Dwight Tiendalli – Swansea City
- Jurriën Timber – Arsenal
- Orlando Trustfull – Sheffield Wednesday
- Rafael van der Vaart – Tottenham Hotspur
- Joël Veltman – Brighton & Hove Albion
- Micky van de Ven – Tottenham Hotspur
- Jan Vennegoor of Hesselink – Hull City
- Ron Vlaar – Aston Villa
- Michel Vonk – Manchester City
- Wout Weghorst – Burnley
- Gerard Wiekens – Manchester City
- Mats Wieffer – Brighton & Hove Albion
- Georginio Wijnaldum – Newcastle United, Liverpool
- Clyde Wijnhard – Leeds United
- Jetro Willems – Newcastle United
- Ron Willems – Derby County
- Fabian Wilnis – Ipswich Town
- Ricky van Wolfswinkel – Norwich City
- Nordin Wooter – Watford
- Arjan de Zeeuw – Portsmouth
- Boudewijn Zenden – Chelsea, Middlesbrough, Liverpool, Sunderland
- **Joshua Zirkzee** – **Manchester United**

== New Zealand ==
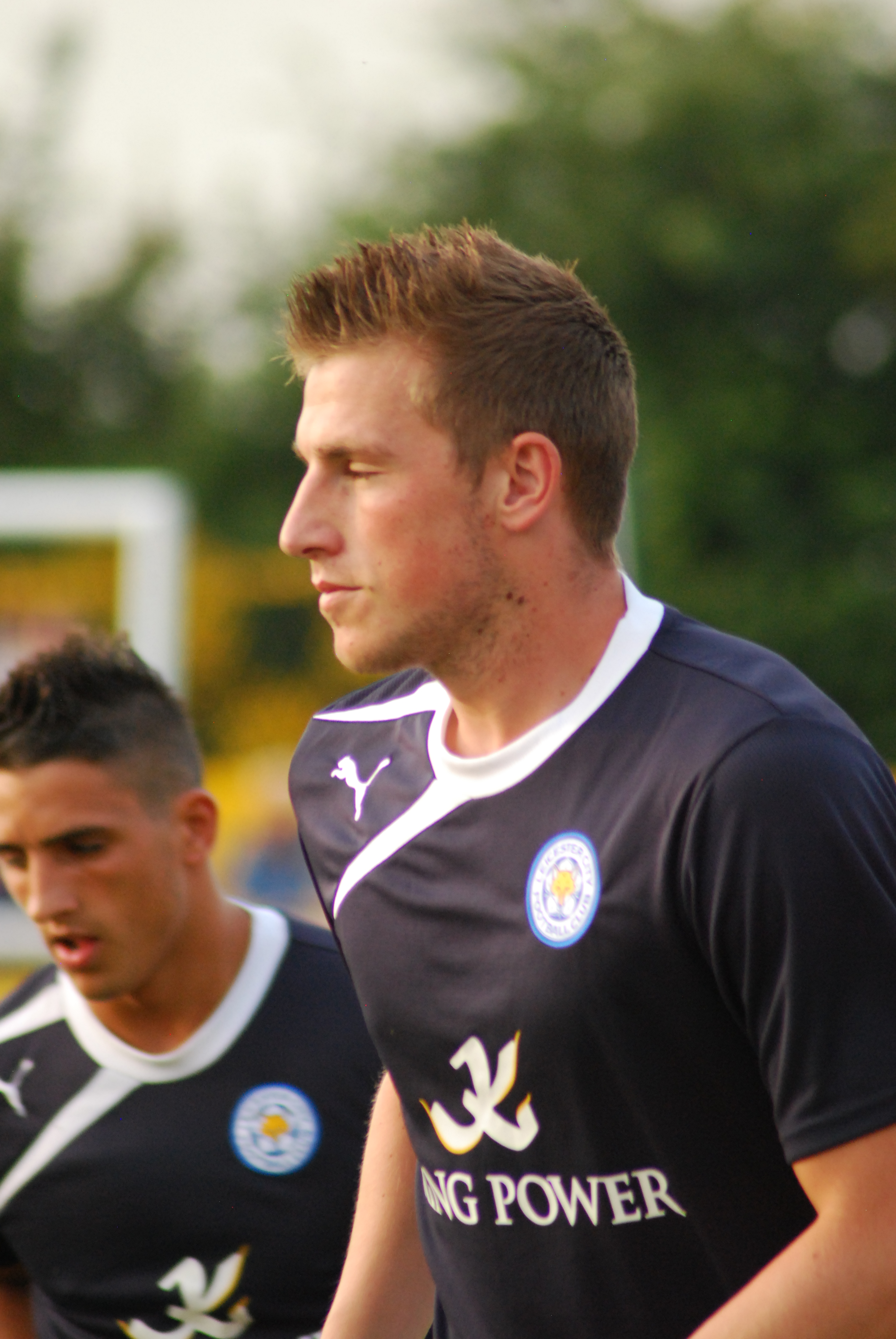
Chris Wood is the highest scoring player from the OFC region in the Premier League

- Ryan Nelsen – Blackburn Rovers, Queens Park Rangers
- Winston Reid – West Ham United
- Chris Wood – Leicester City, Burnley, Newcastle United, Nottingham Forest (92)

== Nigeria ==
- Ola Aina – Fulham, Nottingham Forest
- **Semi Ajayi** – West Bromwich Albion, **Hull City**
- Ade Akinbiyi – Leicester City
- Sammy Ameobi – Newcastle United
- Shola Ameobi – Newcastle United
- Daniel Amokachi – Everton
- Victor Anichebe – Everton, West Bromwich Albion, Sunderland
- Sone Aluko – Hull City
- Joe Aribo – Southampton
- Tolu Arokodare – Wolverhampton Wanderers
- **Taiwo Awoniyi** – Nottingham Forest, **Coventry City**
- Celestine Babayaro – Chelsea, Newcastle United
- Leon Balogun – Brighton & Hove Albion
- Calvin Bassey – Fulham
- Samuel Chukwueze – Fulham
- Emmanuel Dennis – Watford, Nottingham Forest
- Efan Ekoku – Norwich City, Wimbledon
- Dickson Etuhu – Sunderland, Fulham
- Kelvin Etuhu – Manchester City
- Finidi George – Ipswich Town
- Brown Ideye – West Bromwich Albion
- Kelechi Iheanacho – Manchester City, Leicester City
- Odion Ighalo – Watford
- **Alex Iwobi** – Arsenal, Everton, **Fulham**
- Nwankwo Kanu – Arsenal, West Bromwich Albion, Portsmouth
- Ademola Lookman – Everton, Fulham, Leicester City
- Josh Maja – Fulham
- Obafemi Martins – Newcastle United
- John Obi Mikel – Chelsea
- Victor Moses – Wigan Athletic, Chelsea, Liverpool, Stoke City, West Ham United
- Ahmed Musa – Leicester City
- Wilfred Ndidi – Leicester City
- Victor Obinna – West Ham United
- Peter Odemwingie – West Bromwich Albion, Cardiff City, Stoke City
- Jay-Jay Okocha – Bolton Wanderers
- Seyi Olofinjana – Stoke City, Hull City
- Paul Onuachu – Southampton
- Frank Onyeka – Brentford
- Danny Shittu – Watford
- Isaac Success – Watford
- Taye Taiwo – Queens Park Rangers
- Nathan Tella – Southampton
- John Utaka – Portsmouth
- Yakubu – Portsmouth, Middlesbrough, Everton, Blackburn Rovers (95)
- Joseph Yobo – Everton

== North Macedonia ==
- Ezgjan Alioski – Leeds United
- Georgi Hristov – Barnsley (4)

== Norway ==
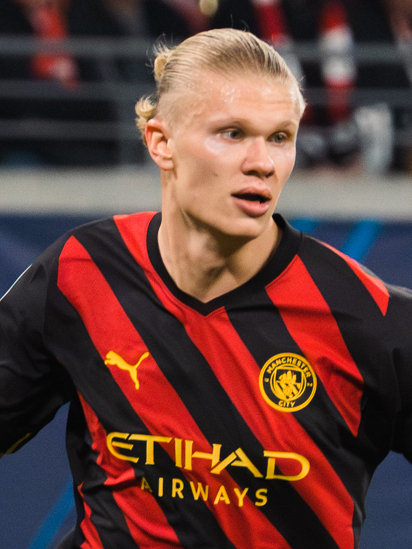
In the 2022–23 season, Erling Haaland broke the record for the most goals scored in a single Premier League campaign with 36

- **Kristoffer Ajer** – **Brentford**
- Martin Andresen – Wimbledon
- Eirik Bakke – Leeds United
- Henning Berg – Blackburn Rovers, Manchester United
- Sander Berge – Sheffield United, Burnley
- Stig Inge Bjørnebye – Liverpool, Blackburn Rovers
- **Oscar Bobb** – Manchester City, **Fulham**
- Lars Bohinen – Nottingham Forest, Blackburn Rovers, Derby County
- Daniel Braaten – Bolton Wanderers
- John Carew – Aston Villa, Stoke City
- Mats Møller Dæhli – Cardiff City
- Adama Diomande – Hull City
- Mohamed Elyounoussi – Southampton
- Jan Åge Fjørtoft – Swindon Town, Middlesbrough, Barnsley
- Jostein Flo – Sheffield United
- Tore André Flo – Chelsea, Sunderland
- Alf-Inge Haaland – Nottingham Forest, Leeds United, Manchester City
- **Erling Haaland** – **Manchester City** (121)
- Gunnar Halle – Oldham Athletic, Leeds United
- Brede Hangeland – Fulham, Crystal Palace
- Vegard Heggem – Liverpool
- Jon Olav Hjelde – Nottingham Forest
- Steffen Iversen – Tottenham Hotspur, Wolverhampton Wanderers
- Erland Johnsen – Chelsea
- Ronny Johnsen – Manchester United, Aston Villa
- Azar Karadas – Portsmouth
- Joshua King – Bournemouth, Watford
- **Jørgen Strand Larsen** – Wolverhampton Wanderers, **Crystal Palace**
- Øyvind Leonhardsen – Wimbledon, Liverpool, Tottenham Hotspur, Aston Villa
- Andreas Lund – Wimbledon
- Claus Lundekvam – Southampton
- Erik Nevland – Fulham
- Mathias Normann – Norwich City
- **Martin Ødegaard** – **Arsenal**
- Egil Østenstad – Southampton, Blackburn Rovers
- Morten Gamst Pedersen – Blackburn Rovers
- John Arne Riise – Liverpool, Fulham
- Petter Rudi – Sheffield Wednesday
- Ståle Solbakken – Wimbledon
- Ole Gunnar Solskjær – Manchester United
- Trond Egil Soltvedt – Coventry City, Southampton
- Frank Strandli – Leeds United
- Jo Tessem – Southampton
- Alexander Tettey – Norwich City

== Paraguay ==
- Antolín Alcaraz – Wigan Athletic
- Omar Alderete – Sunderland
- Miguel Almirón – Newcastle United
- Fabián Balbuena – West Ham United
- **Julio Enciso** – Brighton & Hove Albion, **Ipswich Town**
- Diego Gavilán – Newcastle United
- **Diego Gómez** – **Brighton & Hove Albion**
- Cristian Riveros – Sunderland
- Roque Santa Cruz – Blackburn Rovers, Manchester City (26)
- Ramón Sosa – Nottingham Forest

== Peru ==
- André Carrillo – Watford
- Claudio Pizarro – Chelsea
- Nolberto Solano – Newcastle United, Aston Villa, West Ham United (49)
- Oliver Sonne – Burnley
- Ysrael Zúñiga – Coventry City

== Poland ==
- Jan Bednarek – Southampton
- Matty Cash – Aston Villa (10)
- Jakub Kiwior – Arsenal
- Mateusz Klich – Leeds United
- Robert Warzycha – Everton
- Marcin Wasilewski – Leicester City

== Portugal ==
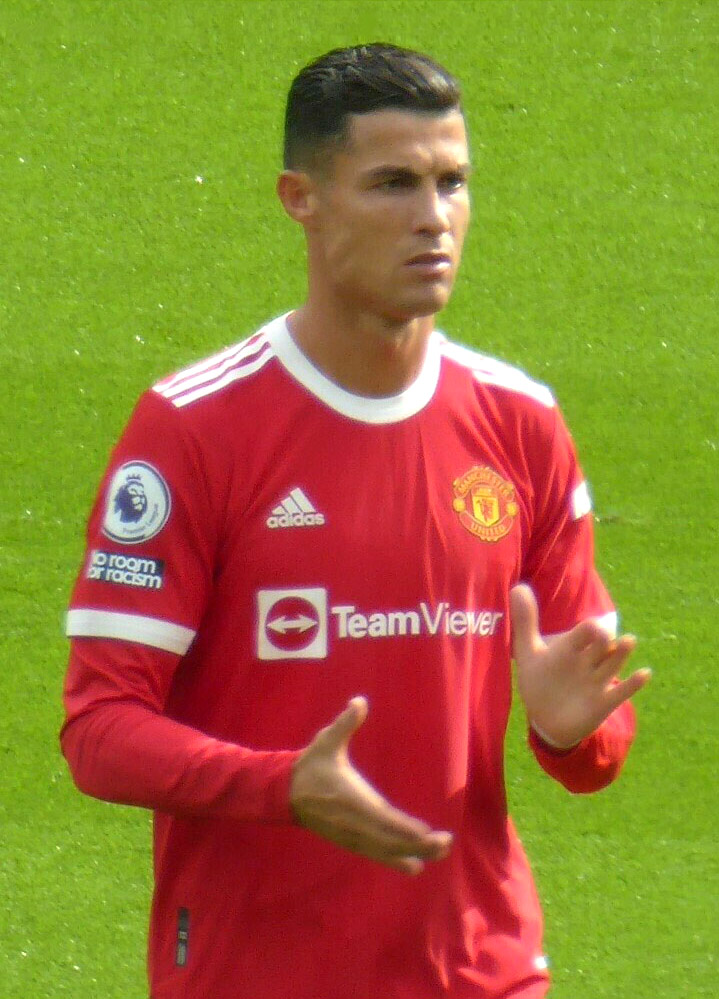
Cristiano Ronaldo scored 103 Premier League goals for Manchester United, a record for a Portuguese player

- Luís Boa Morte – Southampton, Fulham, West Ham United
- José Bosingwa – Chelsea
- João Cancelo – Manchester City
- **Fábio Carvalho** – Liverpool, **Brentford**
- Ricardo Carvalho – Chelsea
- Ivan Cavaleiro – Wolverhampton Wanderers, Fulham
- Cédric – Southampton, Arsenal
- Diogo Dalot – Manchester United
- Dani – West Ham United
- Deco – Chelsea
- Rúben Dias – Manchester City
- José Dominguez – Tottenham Hotspur
- João Félix – Chelsea
- **Bruno Fernandes** – **Manchester United**
- Manuel Fernandes – Everton
- Mateus Fernandes – Southampton, West Ham United
- José Fonte – Southampton
- André Gomes – Everton
- Rodrigo Gomes – Wolverhampton Wanderers
- Toti Gomes – Wolverhampton Wanderers
- Gonçalo Guedes – Wolverhampton Wanderers
- Hélder – Newcastle United
- João Mário – West Ham United
- Diogo Jota – Wolverhampton Wanderers, Liverpool
- **Florentino Luís** – **Ipswich Town**
- Mateus Mané – Wolverhampton Wanderers
- Raul Meireles – Liverpool, Chelsea
- Pedro Mendes – Tottenham Hotspur, Portsmouth
- João Moutinho – Wolverhampton Wanderers
- Nani – Manchester United
- **Pedro Neto** – Wolverhampton Wanderers, **Chelsea**
- Rúben Neves – Wolverhampton Wanderers
- Matheus Nunes – Wolverhampton Wanderers, Manchester City
- Nélson Oliveira – Swansea City
- João Palhinha – Fulham, Tottenham Hotspur
- Ricardo Pereira – Leicester City
- Daniel Podence – Wolverhampton Wanderers
- Hugo Porfírio – West Ham United, Nottingham Forest
- Hélder Postiga – Tottenham Hotspur
- Domingos Quina – Watford
- Bruno Ribeiro – Leeds United
- Cristiano Ronaldo – Manchester United (103)
- Orlando Sá – Fulham
- Nélson Semedo – Wolverhampton Wanderers
- Bernardo Silva – Manchester City
- Fábio Silva – Wolverhampton Wanderers
- Jota Silva – Nottingham Forest
- Nuno Tavares – Arsenal
- Tiago – Chelsea
- Francisco Trincão – Wolverhampton Wanderers
- Silvestre Varela – West Bromwich Albion
- Ricardo Vaz Tê – Bolton Wanderers, West Ham United
- Hugo Viana – Newcastle United
- Fábio Vieira – Arsenal
- Abel Xavier – Liverpool, Middlesbrough

== Republic of Ireland ==
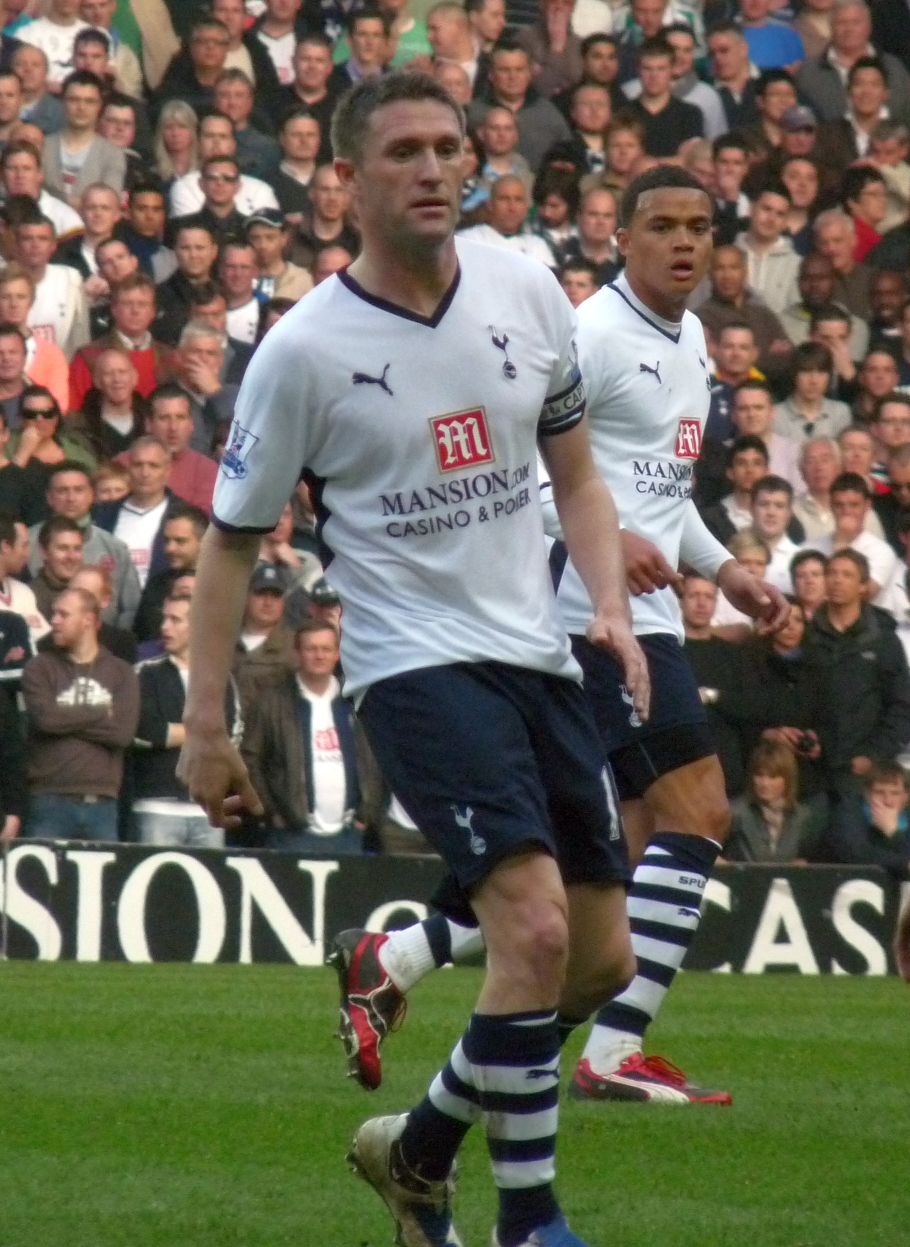
With 126 goals, Robbie Keane is the highest Premier League scorer from the Republic of Ireland

- Keith Andrews – Blackburn Rovers, West Bromwich Albion
- Harry Arter – Bournemouth
- Phil Babb – Liverpool
- Leon Best – Newcastle United
- Robbie Brady – Hull City, Norwich City, Burnley
- Gary Breen – Coventry City, Sunderland
- Paul Butler – Sunderland, Wolverhampton Wanderers
- Stephen Carr – Tottenham Hotspur, Newcastle United
- Lee Carsley – Derby County, Coventry City, Everton
- Tony Cascarino – Chelsea
- Ciaran Clark – Aston Villa, Newcastle United
- Séamus Coleman – Everton
- Nathan Collins – Burnley, Brentford
- Aaron Connolly – Brighton & Hove Albion
- David Connolly – Wigan Athletic
- Simon Cox – West Bromwich Albion
- Josh Cullen – Burnley
- Liam Daish – Coventry City
- Damien Delaney – Crystal Palace
- Rory Delap – Derby County, Southampton, Sunderland, Stoke City
- Gary Doherty – Tottenham Hotspur, Norwich City
- Matt Doherty – Wolverhampton Wanderers, Tottenham Hotspur
- Jonathan Douglas – Blackburn Rovers
- Kevin Doyle – Reading, Wolverhampton Wanderers
- Damien Duff – Blackburn Rovers, Chelsea, Newcastle United, Fulham
- Shane Duffy – Brighton & Hove Albion
- Jimmy Dunne – Burnley
- Richard Dunne – Manchester City, Aston Villa
- John Egan – Sheffield United
- Stephen Elliott – Sunderland
- Mickey Evans – Southampton
- Keith Fahey – Birmingham City
- Gareth Farrelly – Everton, Bolton Wanderers
- Evan Ferguson – Brighton & Hove Albion
- Steve Finnan – Liverpool
- Curtis Fleming – Middlesbrough
- Willo Flood – Manchester City
- Caleb Folan – Wigan Athletic, Hull City
- Dominic Foley – Watford
- Kevin Foley – Wolverhampton Wanderers
- Darron Gibson – Manchester United, Everton
- Jon Goodman – Wimbledon
- Ian Harte – Leeds United
- Jeff Hendrick – Burnley, Newcastle United
- Matt Holland – Ipswich Town, Charlton Athletic
- Wes Hoolahan – Norwich City
- Ray Houghton – Aston Villa, Crystal Palace
- Conor Hourihane – Aston Villa
- Noel Hunt – Reading
- Stephen Hunt – Reading, Hull City, Wolverhampton Wanderers
- Adam Idah – Norwich City
- Stephen Ireland – Manchester City, Aston Villa, Stoke City
- Denis Irwin – Manchester United
- Graham Kavanagh – Middlesbrough
- Robbie Keane – Coventry City, Leeds United, Tottenham Hotspur, Liverpool, West Ham United, Aston Villa (126)
- Roy Keane – Nottingham Forest, Manchester United
- Mark Kennedy – Wolverhampton Wanderers
- Gary Kelly – Leeds United
- Stephen Kelly – Tottenham Hotspur
- Jeff Kenna – Southampton, Blackburn Rovers, Birmingham City
- Andy Keogh – Wolverhampton Wanderers
- Alan Kernaghan – Middlesbrough, Manchester City
- Kevin Kilbane – Sunderland, Everton, Wigan Athletic, Hull City
- Mark Kinsella – Charlton Athletic
- Liam Lawrence – Sunderland, Stoke City
- Kevin Long – Burnley
- Shane Long – Reading, West Bromwich Albion, Hull City, Southampton
- Jon Macken – Manchester City
- Alan Mahon – Blackburn Rovers, Wigan Athletic
- Jason McAteer – Liverpool, Blackburn Rovers, Sunderland
- Kasey McAteer – Leicester City
- James McCarthy – Wigan Athletic, Everton
- James McClean – Sunderland, West Bromwich Albion
- Aiden McGeady – Everton
- David McGoldrick – Sheffield United
- Eddie McGoldrick – Crystal Palace
- Paul McGrath – Aston Villa
- Stephen McPhail – Leeds United
- Paul McShane – Hull City
- David Meyler – Hull City
- Liam Miller – Manchester United
- Kevin Moran – Blackburn Rovers
- Chris Morris – Middlesbrough
- Clinton Morrison – Crystal Palace, Birmingham City
- Daryl Murphy – Sunderland
- Michael Obafemi – Southampton
- Andy O'Brien – Bradford City, Newcastle United, Bolton Wanderers
- Jake O'Brien – Everton
- Joey O'Brien – West Ham United
- Liam O'Brien – Newcastle United
- Chiedozie Ogbene – Luton Town
- Andrew Omobamidele – Norwich City
- **Dara O'Shea** – Burnley, **Ipswich Town**
- John O'Shea – Manchester United, Sunderland
- Terry Phelan – Manchester City
- Anthony Pilkington – Norwich City
- Lee Power – Norwich City
- Alan Quinn – Sheffield Wednesday
- Niall Quinn – Manchester City, Sunderland
- Stephen Quinn – Sheffield United, Hull City
- Michael Reddy – Sunderland
- Andy Reid – Tottenham Hotspur, Charlton Athletic, Sunderland
- Steven Reid – Blackburn Rovers, West Bromwich Albion
- Callum Robinson – Sheffield United, West Bromwich Albion
- Matthew Rush – West Ham United
- Conor Sammon – Wigan Athletic
- John Sheridan – Sheffield Wednesday
- Bernie Slaven – Middlesbrough
- Will Smallbone – Southampton
- Steve Staunton – Aston Villa
- Enda Stevens – Sheffield United
- Anthony Stokes – Sunderland
- Sammie Szmodics – Ipswich Town
- Jack Taylor – Ipswich Town
- Sean Thornton – Sunderland
- Andy Townsend – Chelsea, Aston Villa, Middlesbrough
- Andy Turner – Tottenham Hotspur
- Jonathan Walters – Stoke City
- Stephen Ward – Wolverhampton Wanderers, Burnley
- Glenn Whelan – Stoke City
- Ronnie Whelan – Liverpool
- Marc Wilson – Stoke City

== Romania ==
- Florin Andone – Brighton & Hove Albion
- Vlad Chiricheș – Tottenham Hotspur
- Ilie Dumitrescu – Tottenham Hotspur
- Ioan Viorel Ganea – Wolverhampton Wanderers
- Viorel Moldovan – Coventry City
- Adrian Mutu – Chelsea
- Dan Petrescu – Sheffield Wednesday, Chelsea, Bradford City, Southampton (23)
- Gheorghe Popescu – Tottenham Hotspur
- Florin Răducioiu – West Ham United

== Russia ==
- Andrey Arshavin – Arsenal
- Diniyar Bilyaletdinov – Everton
- Andrei Kanchelskis – Manchester United, Everton (42)
- Roman Pavlyuchenko – Tottenham Hotspur
- Pavel Pogrebnyak – Fulham, Reading

== Saint Kitts and Nevis ==
- Bobby Bowry – Crystal Palace (1)

== Senegal ==
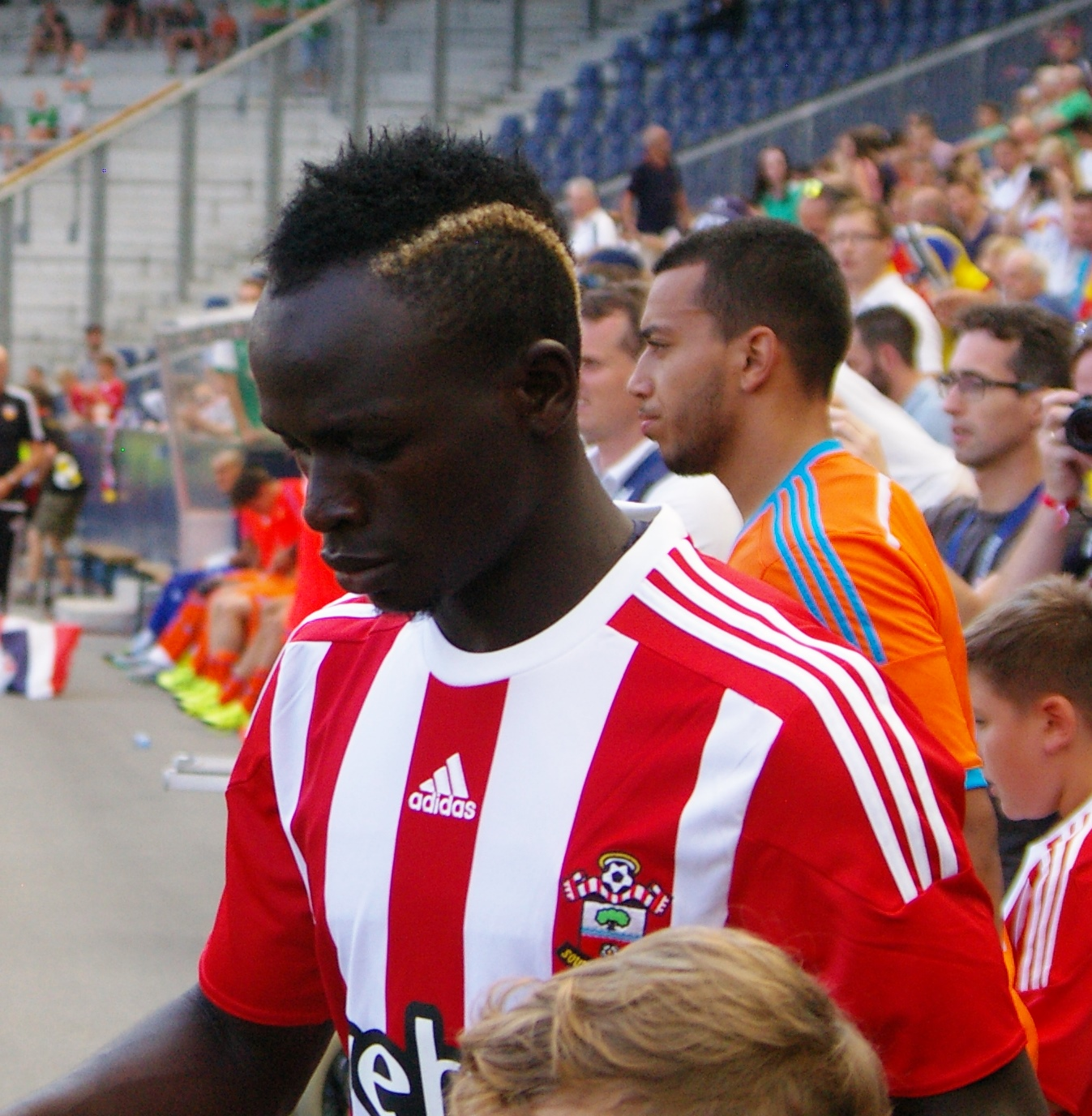
Sadio Mané holds the record for the fastest Premier League hat-trick

- Demba Ba – West Ham United, Newcastle United, Chelsea
- Habib Beye – Newcastle United
- Henri Camara – Wolverhampton Wanderers, Southampton, Wigan Athletic
- Papiss Cissé – Newcastle United
- Mbaye Diagne – West Bromwich Albion
- Mohamed Diamé – Wigan Athletic, West Ham United, Hull City, Newcastle United
- Salif Diao – Liverpool, Stoke City
- Habib Diarra – Sunderland
- Papa Bouba Diop – Fulham
- El Hadji Diouf – Liverpool, Bolton Wanderers, Blackburn Rovers
- Mame Biram Diouf – Manchester United, Blackburn Rovers, Stoke City
- Khalilou Fadiga – Bolton Wanderers
- Abdoulaye Faye – Bolton Wanderers, Newcastle United
- Amdy Faye – Charlton Athletic
- Idrissa Gueye – Everton
- Magaye Gueye – Everton
- **Nicolas Jackson** – Chelsea, **Aston Villa**
- Diomansy Kamara – Portsmouth, West Bromwich Albion, Fulham
- Kalidou Koulibaly – Chelsea
- Cheikhou Kouyaté – West Ham United, Crystal Palace, Nottingham Forest
- Sadio Mané – Southampton, Liverpool (111)
- Nampalys Mendy – Leicester City
- **Nobel Mendy** – **Hull City**
- Alfred N'Diaye – Hull City
- Badou Ndiaye – Stoke City
- Iliman Ndiaye – Everton
- Dame N'Doye – Hull City, Sunderland
- Moussa Niakhaté – Nottingham Forest
- M'Baye Niang – Watford
- Oumar Niasse – Hull City, Everton
- Henri Saivet – Newcastle United
- Diafra Sakho – West Ham United
- Lamine Sakho – Leeds United
- Ismaïla Sarr – Watford, Crystal Palace
- Pape Matar Sarr – Tottenham Hotspur
- Ibrahima Sonko – Reading
- Armand Traoré – Portsmouth

== Serbia ==
- Jovo Bosančić – Barnsley
- Goran Bunjevčević – Tottenham Hotspur
- Saša Ćurčić – Bolton Wanderers, Crystal Palace
- Branislav Ivanović – Chelsea
- Mateja Kežman – Chelsea
- Aleksandar Kolarov – Manchester City
- Ognjen Koroman – Portsmouth
- Darko Kovačević – Sheffield Wednesday
- Saša Lukić – Fulham
- Lazar Marković – Liverpool, Hull City
- Nemanja Matić – Chelsea, Manchester United
- Nikola Milenković – Nottingham Forest
- Nenad Milijaš – Wolverhampton Wanderers
- Luka Milivojević – Crystal Palace
- Savo Milošević – Aston Villa
- Aleksandar Mitrović – Newcastle United, Fulham (38)
- Matija Nastasić – Manchester City
- Dejan Stefanović – Sheffield Wednesday, Portsmouth
- Dušan Tadić – Southampton
- Nemanja Vidić – Manchester United
- Nikola Žigić – Birmingham City

== Sierra Leone ==
- Steven Caulker – Tottenham Hotspur, Cardiff City, Queens Park Rangers (8)
- Curtis Davies – West Bromwich Albion, Aston Villa, Hull City
- Kei Kamara – Norwich City

== Slovakia ==
- Igor Bališ – West Bromwich Albion
- Vratislav Greško – Blackburn Rovers
- Vladimír Kinder – Middlesbrough
- Juraj Kucka – Watford
- Ľubomír Michalík – Bolton Wanderers
- Szilárd Németh – Middlesbrough (23)
- Martin Škrtel – Liverpool
- Stanislav Varga – Sunderland

== Slovenia ==
- Jaka Bijol – Leeds United
- Jon Gorenc Stanković – Huddersfield Town
- Robert Koren – West Bromwich Albion, Hull City
- **Benjamin Šeško** – **Manchester United** (12)

== South Africa ==
- Shaun Bartlett – Charlton Athletic
- Kagisho Dikgacoi – Crystal Palace
- Mark Fish – Bolton Wanderers, Charlton Athletic
- Quinton Fortune – Manchester United
- Lyle Foster – Burnley
- Mbulelo Mabizela – Tottenham Hotspur
- Phil Masinga – Leeds United
- Benni McCarthy – Blackburn Rovers (37)
- Steven Pienaar – Everton
- Eric Tinkler – Barnsley

== Spain ==
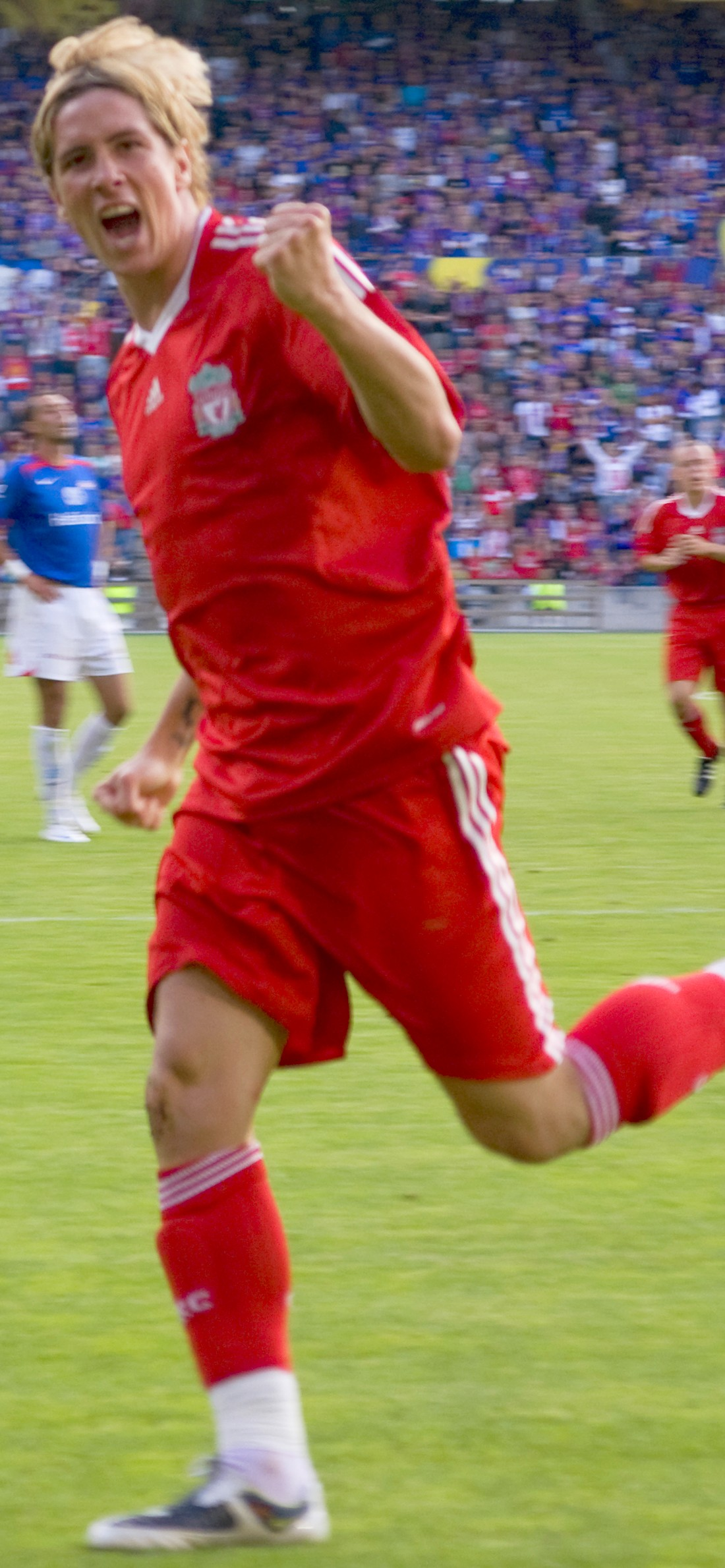
Fernando Torres scored 85 Premier League goals, making him the highest scoring Spaniard in the competition's history

- Marcos Alonso – Bolton Wanderers, Chelsea
- Xabi Alonso – Liverpool
- **Chema Andrés** – **Brighton & Hove Albion**
- Álvaro Arbeloa – Liverpool
- Mikel Arteta – Everton, Arsenal
- Marco Asensio – Aston Villa
- Daniel Ayala – Middlesbrough
- Ayoze – Newcastle United, Leicester City
- César Azpilicueta – Chelsea
- Stefan Bajcetic – Liverpool
- Borja Bastón – Swansea City
- Héctor Bellerín – Arsenal
- Bojan – Stoke City
- Hugo Bueno – Wolverhampton Wanderers
- Cala – Cardiff City
- Víctor Camarasa – Cardiff City
- Iván Campo – Bolton Wanderers
- Sergi Canós – Brentford
- Santi Cazorla – Arsenal
- Chico – Swansea City
- Diego Costa – Chelsea, Wolverhampton Wanderers
- Albert Crusat – Wigan Athletic
- Marc Cucurella – Brighton & Hove Albion, Chelsea
- Carlos Cuéllar – Aston Villa, Sunderland
- Gerard Deulofeu – Everton, Watford
- Asier del Horno – Chelsea
- José Enrique – Newcastle United, Liverpool
- Cesc Fàbregas – Arsenal, Chelsea
- Ansu Fati – Brighton & Hove Albion
- Kiko Femenía – Watford
- Pablo Fornals – West Ham United
- **Gonzalo García** – **Fulham**
- Javi García – Manchester City
- Luis García – Liverpool
- Javier Garrido – Manchester City
- Carles Gil – Aston Villa
- Jordi Gómez – Wigan Athletic, Sunderland
- Nico González – Manchester City
- Esteban Granero – Queens Park Rangers
- Pablo Hernández – Swansea City
- Ander Herrera – Manchester United
- Fernando Hierro – Bolton Wanderers
- Dean Huijsen – Bournemouth
- Pablo Ibáñez – West Bromwich Albion
- Vicente Iborra – Leicester City
- Jesé – Stoke City
- Álex Jiménez – Bournemouth
- Jonny – Wolverhampton Wanderers
- Joselu – Stoke City, Newcastle United
- Kepa Blanco – West Ham United
- Aymeric Laporte – Manchester City
- Diego Llorente – Leeds United
- Fernando Llorente – Swansea City, Tottenham Hotspur
- Antonio Luna – Aston Villa
- Albert Luque – Newcastle United
- Javier Manquillo – Sunderland, Newcastle United
- Juan Mata – Chelsea, Manchester United
- Eliezer Mayenda – Sunderland
- Gaizka Mendieta – Middlesbrough
- Fran Mérida – Arsenal
- Mikel Merino – Newcastle United, Arsenal
- Michu – Swansea City
- Nacho Monreal – Arsenal
- Álvaro Morata – Chelsea
- Alberto Moreno – Liverpool
- Álex Moreno – Aston Villa
- Fernando Morientes – Liverpool
- Marc Muniesa – Stoke City
- **Víctor Muñoz** – **Liverpool**
- Jesús Navas – Manchester City
- Nayim – Tottenham Hotspur
- Álvaro Negredo – Manchester City, Middlesbrough
- Nolito – Manchester City
- Andrea Orlandi – Swansea City
- **César Palacios** – **Fulham**
- Pedro – Chelsea
- Lucas Pérez – Arsenal, West Ham United
- **Yéremy Pino** – **Crystal Palace**
- Pedro Porro – Tottenham Hotspur
- Iván Ramis – Wigan Athletic
- Àngel Rangel – Swansea City
- Sergio Reguilón – Tottenham Hotspur
- José Antonio Reyes – Arsenal
- Albert Riera – Manchester City, Liverpool
- Marc Roca – Leeds United
- Rubén Rochina – Blackburn Rovers
- Rodri – Manchester City
- Rodrigo – Bolton Wanderers, Leeds United
- Oriol Romeu – Southampton
- Pablo Sarabia – Wolverhampton Wanderers
- David Silva – Manchester City
- Roberto Soldado – Tottenham Hotspur
- Carlos Soler – West Ham United
- Thiago – Liverpool
- Fernando Torres – Liverpool, Chelsea (85)
- Ferran Torres – Manchester City
- Pau Torres – Aston Villa
- Adama Traoré – Wolverhampton Wanderers, Fulham
- Diego Tristán – West Ham United
- Xisco – Newcastle United
- Yordi – Blackburn Rovers
- Martín Zubimendi – Arsenal

== Sweden ==
- Niclas Alexandersson – Sheffield Wednesday, Everton
- Marcus Allbäck – Aston Villa
- Andreas Andersson – Newcastle United
- **Yasin Ayari** – **Brighton & Hove Albion**
- Lucas Bergvall – Tottenham Hotspur
- Jesper Blomqvist – Manchester United, Everton
- Tomas Brolin – Leeds United
- Jens Cajuste – Ipswich Town
- Martin Dahlin – Blackburn Rovers
- Erik Edman – Tottenham Hotspur
- **Anthony Elanga** – Manchester United, Nottingham Forest, **Newcastle United**
- Johan Elmander – Bolton Wanderers, Norwich City
- Viktor Gyökeres – Arsenal
- Zlatan Ibrahimović – Manchester United
- Klas Ingesson – Sheffield Wednesday
- **Alexander Isak** – Newcastle United, **Liverpool** (64)
- Andreas Jakobsson – Southampton
- Pontus Jansson – Brentford
- Andreas Johansson – Wigan Athletic
- Alexander Kačaniklić – Fulham
- Emil Krafth – Newcastle United
- Dejan Kulusevski – Tottenham Hotspur
- Henrik Larsson – Manchester United
- Sebastian Larsson – Birmingham City, Sunderland
- Anders Limpar – Everton
- Victor Lindelöf – Manchester United
- Freddie Ljungberg – Arsenal, West Ham United
- Olof Mellberg – Aston Villa
- Teddy Lučić – Leeds United
- Roland Nilsson – Sheffield Wednesday
- Jonas Olsson – West Bromwich Albion
- Martin Olsson – Blackburn Rovers, Norwich City, Swansea City
- Rade Prica – Sunderland
- Martin Pringle – Charlton Athletic
- Stefan Schwarz – Arsenal, Sunderland
- Ken Sema – Watford
- Anders Svensson – Southampton
- Mathias Svensson – Charlton Athletic, Norwich City
- Michael Svensson – Southampton

== Switzerland ==
- Almen Abdi – Watford
- Manuel Akanji – Manchester City
- Zeki Amdouni – Burnley
- Valon Behrami – West Ham United
- Johan Djourou – Arsenal
- Josip Drmić – Norwich City
- Gélson Fernandes – Manchester City
- Marc Hottiger – Newcastle United, Everton
- Pajtim Kasami – Fulham
- Timm Klose – Norwich City
- **Johan Manzambi** – **Aston Villa**
- **Dan Ndoye** – **Nottingham Forest**
- **Noah Okafor** – **Leeds United**
- Fabian Schär – Newcastle United
- Philippe Senderos – Arsenal, Fulham
- Xherdan Shaqiri – Stoke City, Liverpool (22)
- Ramon Vega – Tottenham Hotspur
- Granit Xhaka – Arsenal, Sunderland
- Reto Ziegler – Tottenham Hotspur

== Tanzania ==
- Mbwana Samatta – Aston Villa (1)

== Togo ==
- Emmanuel Adebayor – Arsenal, Manchester City, Tottenham Hotspur, Crystal Palace (97)
- Floyd Ayité – Fulham

== Trinidad and Tobago ==
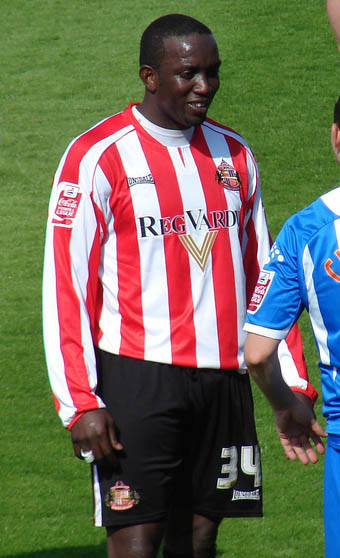
Dwight Yorke scored 123 Premier League goals, a record for a player from the CONCACAF region

- Justin Hoyte – Arsenal, Sunderland
- Stern John – Birmingham City, Sunderland
- Kenwyne Jones – Southampton, Sunderland, Stoke City, Cardiff City
- Jlloyd Samuel – Aston Villa
- Jason Scotland – Wigan Athletic
- Dwight Yorke – Aston Villa, Manchester United, Blackburn Rovers, Birmingham City, Sunderland (123)

== Tunisia ==
- Radhi Jaïdi – Bolton Wanderers (8)
- Wahbi Khazri – Sunderland
- Hannibal Mejbri – Manchester United, Burnley
- Hatem Trabelsi – Manchester City
- Yan Valery – Southampton

== Turkey ==
- Alpay – Aston Villa
- Emre Belözoğlu – Newcastle United
- Muzzy Izzet – Leicester City, Birmingham City (34)
- Ferdi Kadıoğlu – Brighton & Hove Albion
- Jem Karacan – Reading
- Colin Kazim-Richards – Sheffield United
- Nuri Şahin – Liverpool
- Çağlar Söyüncü – Leicester City
- Hakan Şükür – Blackburn Rovers
- Cenk Tosun – Everton, Crystal Palace
- Tugay – Blackburn Rovers
- Tuncay – Middlesbrough, Stoke City
- Enes Ünal – Bournemouth

== Ukraine ==
- Mykhailo Mudryk – Chelsea
- Vitaliy Mykolenko – Everton
- Serhiy Rebrov – Tottenham Hotspur (10)
- Andriy Shevchenko – Chelsea
- Andriy Voronin – Liverpool
- Andriy Yarmolenko – West Ham United
- **Yehor Yarmolyuk** – **Brentford**
- Illia Zabarnyi – Bournemouth
- Oleksandr Zinchenko – Arsenal

== United States ==
- **Brenden Aaronson** – **Leeds United**
- Tyler Adams – Bournemouth
- Jozy Altidore – Hull City, Sunderland
- DaMarcus Beasley – Manchester City
- Carlos Bocanegra – Fulham
- Geoff Cameron – Stoke City
- Jay DeMerit – Watford
- Clint Dempsey – Fulham, Tottenham Hotspur (57)
- Landon Donovan – Everton
- Brad Friedel – Blackburn Rovers
- John Harkes – Sheffield Wednesday
- Stuart Holden – Bolton Wanderers
- Tim Howard – Everton
- Cobi Jones – Coventry City
- Jovan Kirovski – Birmingham City
- Eric Lichaj – Aston Villa
- Brian McBride – Everton, Fulham
- Joe-Max Moore – Everton
- Preki – Everton
- Christian Pulisic – Chelsea
- Tim Ream – Fulham
- Claudio Reyna – Sunderland, Manchester City
- Chris Richards – Crystal Palace
- Antonee Robinson – Fulham
- Josh Sargent – Norwich City
- Jonathan Spector – West Ham United
- Roy Wegerle – Blackburn Rovers, Coventry City
- DeAndre Yedlin – Newcastle United

== Uruguay ==
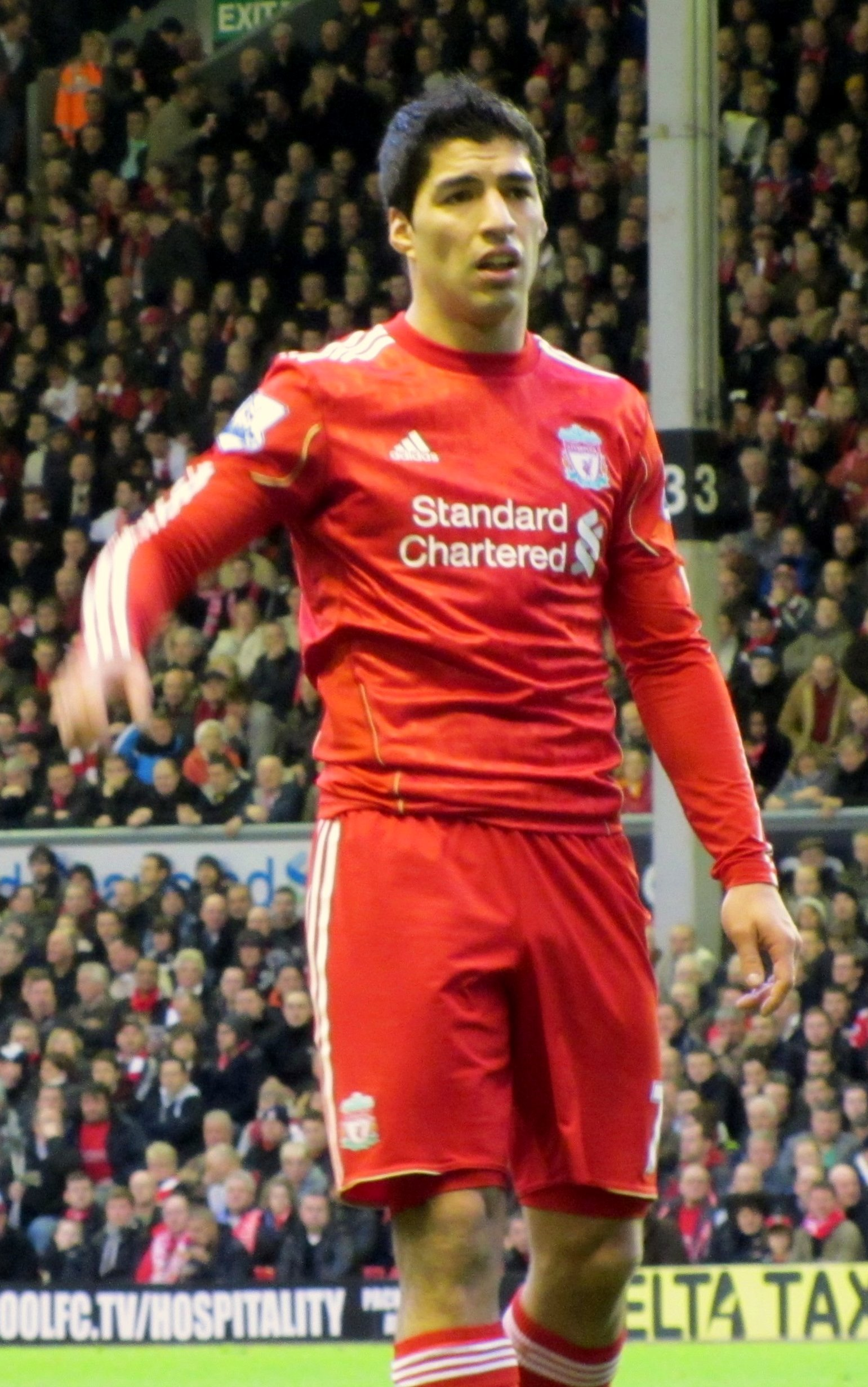
Luis Suárez scored 69 Premier League goals for Liverpool, making him the competition's highest scoring Uruguayan

- Rodrigo Bentancur – Tottenham Hotspur
- Miguel Britos – Watford
- Santiago Bueno – Wolverhampton Wanderers
- Edinson Cavani – Manchester United
- Sebastián Coates – Liverpool
- Diego Forlán – Manchester United
- Diego Lugano – West Bromwich Albion
- Abel Hernández – Hull City
- Williams Martínez – West Bromwich Albion
- Darwin Núñez – Liverpool
- Walter Pandiani – Birmingham City
- Adrián Paz – Ipswich Town
- Gus Poyet – Chelsea, Tottenham Hotspur
- Gastón Ramírez – Southampton, Middlesbrough
- Darío Silva – Portsmouth
- Cristhian Stuani – Middlesbrough
- Luis Suárez – Liverpool (69)
- Lucas Torreira – Arsenal
- Manuel Ugarte – Manchester United
- Matías Viña – Bournemouth

== Venezuela ==
- Fernando Amorebieta – Fulham
- Salomón Rondón – West Bromwich Albion, Newcastle United, Everton (36)

== Zambia ==
- Patson Daka – Leicester City (10)
- Enock Mwepu – Brighton & Hove Albion

== Zimbabwe ==
- Benjani – Portsmouth, Manchester City, Blackburn Rovers
- Marshall Munetsi – Wolverhampton Wanderers
- Peter Ndlovu – Coventry City (34)
