= Douglas Rinaldi =

Brazilian footballer (born 1979)

Personal information
- Full name: Douglas de Medeiros Rinaldi
- Date of birth: 29 August 1979 (age 47)
- Place of birth: Erval Seco, Brazil
- Height: 1.83 m (6 ft 0 in)
- Position: Midfielder

Youth career
- –1996: Criciúma

Senior career*
Years	Team	Apps	(Gls)
1998–2002	Santo Ângelo		
2002	Trento	8	(0)
2003	Glória		
2003	Mataró	15	(0)
2004	Canoas		
2004	Apollon Kalamarias	5	(0)
2005	Canoas		
2005	Pelotas		
2006	Veranópolis		
2006	→ Novo Hamburgo (loan)		
2007	→ Watford (loan)	7	(1)
2007–2008	Watford	0	(0)
2009	Veranópolis		
2010	Ehime FC	1	(0)
2011	Esportivo		
2012–2013	União Frederiquense e SAF		
- * Club domestic league appearances and goals

Douglas de Medeiros Rinaldi (born 29 August 1979) is a Brazilian former professional footballer who played as a midfielder.

== Career ==
Born in Erval Seco, Rio Grande do Sul, Rinaldi started his career at the youth team of Criciúma. After failing to become a professional footballer, Rinaldi decided to quit football. However, after a trial with Santo Ângelo, he signed his first professional contract and stayed with the club until 2002, when he joined Italian side Trento. He returned to Brazil in the following year and, after acquiring a European passport, Rinaldi spent the following years playing for Rio Grande do Sul based teams, with brief overseas spells with Mataró and Apollon Kalamarias.

During the January 2007 transfer window, Rinaldi was signed on a six-month loan deal by Watford from Brazilian club Veranópolis. He made his first appearance for Watford in a 3–1 defeat at Tottenham Hotspur on 17 March 2007, coming on as a substitute. His performance gained praise from Watford manager Aidy Boothroyd. Rinaldi scored his first professional goal for Watford on 18 April 2007 in another 3–1 defeat, this time to Blackburn Rovers.

On 22 May 2007, Rinaldi signed a two-year contract with Watford for an initial fee of £250,000. He found chances hard to come by since joining on a long-term contract and only featured in two of the Hornets' games in the 2007–08 season, which came in the League Cup against Gillingham (in which he scored) and Southend United. Rinaldi played in the reserve team during that season but failed to persuade Boothroyd to select him for the first team.

On 17 July 2008, Watford terminated Rinaldi's contract with immediate effect. He later returned to Brazil and joined Ehime FC in 2010. On 16 April 2010, Rinaldi left the club after only four months and returned to his native Brazil, playing a single match for the club from the island of Shikoku. He retired from football in 2013 after União Frederiquense failed to achieve promotion to Campeonato Gaúcho.

He retired in 2013.
