= Erval Seco =

Municipality in Rio Grande do Sul, Brazil

Coordinates: 27°33′S 53°30′W

- Municipality
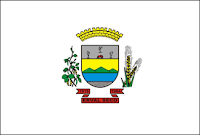
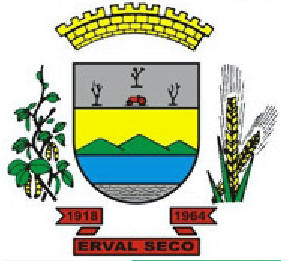
- Flag Coat of arms
- Interactive map of Erval Seco
- Country: Brazil
- Time zone: UTC−3 (BRT)

Erval Seco is a municipality in the state of Rio Grande do Sul, Brazil. It was raised to municipality status in 1963, the area being taken out of the municipalities of Seberi, Palmeira das Missões, and Tenente Portela. As of 2020, the estimated population was 6,802.

== See also ==
- List of municipalities in Rio Grande do Sul
