= 2007–08 Hartlepool United F.C. season =

Hartlepool United
2007–08 season
- Owner: IOR
- Chairman: Ken Hodcroft
- Manager: Danny Wilson
- Stadium: Victoria Park
- Football League One: 15th
- FA Cup: Second round (Eliminated by Hereford United)
- Football League Cup: Second round (Eliminated by Sheffield Wednesday)
- Football League Trophy: Third round (Eliminated by Morecambe)
- Top goalscorer: League: Richie Barker (13); All: Richie Barker (16)
- Highest home attendance: 7,784 (vs Leeds United)
- Lowest home attendance: 2,776 (vs Morecambe)
- Average home league attendance: 4,506
- Biggest win: 6–0 (vs. Gainsborough Trinity)
- Biggest defeat: 4–2 (vs. Carlisle United)
Home colours	Away colours	Third colours

The 2007–08 season was the 99th year of competitive football played by Hartlepool United Football Club, a professional association football club based in Hartlepool, County Durham, England. Along with competing in League One, the club also participated in the FA Cup, League Cup and League Trophy. The season covers the period from 1 July 2007 to 30 June 2008.

== Season summary ==
Having finished second in League Two the previous season, manager Danny Wilson led the club to a 15th-place finish in their first season back in League One, although they were only six points clear of the relegation zone in a tight division.

== Players ==
As of End of Season.

=== First-team squad ===
Note: Flags indicate national team as defined under FIFA eligibility rules; some limited exceptions apply. Players may hold more than one non-FIFA nationality.

No.	Pos.	Nation	Player
1	GK	DEN	Jan Budtz
2	DF	SCO	Jamie McCunnie
3	DF	ENG	Robbie Elliott
4	MF	IRL	Willie Boland
5	DF	ENG	Michael Nelson
6	DF	ENG	Ben Clark
7	MF	ENG	Gary Liddle
8	DF	ENG	Ritchie Humphreys
9	FW	ENG	Richie Barker
10	FW	AUS	Joel Porter
11	MF	ENG	Andy Monkhouse
12	DF	ENG	Michael Barron
14	FW	ENG	James Brown
15	MF	ENG	Antony Sweeney

No.	Pos.	Nation	Player
17	FW	ENG	David Foley
18	MF	ENG	Ali Gibb
19	MF	ENG	Matty Robson
20	DF	GHA	Godwin Antwi
21	GK	ENG	Arran Lee-Barrett
23	MF	ENG	Stephen Turnbull
24	FW	ENG	Michael Mackay
26	FW	ENG	Michael Rae
27	DF	ENG	Sam Collins
29	MF	ENG	Tom Haigh
30	MF	ENG	Martin Young
31	GK	ENG	Scott Allison
32	MF	ENG	Jonny Rowell

== Transfers ==
=== Transfers in ===
Date	Position	Player	From	Fee	Ref
22 May 2007	GK	Arran Lee-Barrett	Coventry City	Free	
29 June 2007	GK	Jan Budtz	Doncaster Rovers	Free	
15 June 2007	DF	Jamie McCunnie	Dunfermline	Free	
6 July 2007	DF	Robbie Elliott	Leeds United	Free	
12 July 2007	FW	Ian Moore	Leeds United	Free	
31 January 2008	DF	Sam Collins	Hull City	Undisclosed	

=== Loans in ===
Date	Position	Player	From	End date	Ref
29 June 2007	DF	Godwin Antwi	Liverpool	1 June 2008	
1 October 2007	DF	Danny Coles	Hull City	1 November 2007	
22 November 2007	DF	Eddie Nolan	Blackburn Rovers	22 January 2008	
22 January 2008	MF	Alan Thompson	Leeds United	22 February 2008	
14 February 2008	DF	Graeme Lee	Doncaster Rovers	14 March 2008	
14 February 2008	FW	Tom Craddock	Middlesbrough	17 March 2008	

=== Transfers out ===
Date	Position	Name	To	Fee	Ref
21 May 2007	FW	Michael Proctor	Wrexham	Free	
24 May 2007	DF	John Brackstone	Darlington	Free	
25 May 2007	GK	Dimitrios Konstantopoulos	Coventry City	Free	
11 June 2007	FW	Eifion Williams	Wrexham	Free	
3 July 2007	MF	Darrell Clarke	Salisbury City	Free	
4 July 2007	MF	Mark Tinkler	Livingston	Free	
7 July 2007	MF	Phil Turnbull	York City	Free	
25 July 2007	GK	Jim Provett	Bury	Free	
27 July 2007	DF	Darren Williams	Bradford City	Free	
7 August 2007	DF	Carl Jones	York City	Free	
31 January 2008	MF	Lee Bullock	Bradford City	Free	
31 January 2008	FW	Ian Moore	Tranmere Rovers	Undisclosed	

=== Loans out ===
Date	Position	Player	To	End date	Ref
30 August 2007	MF	Lee Bullock	Mansfield Town	30 September 2007	
5 October 2007	MF	Lee Bullock	Mansfield Town	5 December 2007	
2 January 2008	MF	Lee Bullock	Bradford City	31 January 2008	
11 January 2008	MF	Ali Gibb	Notts County	11 February 2008	

== Results ==
=== Pre-season friendlies ===
17 July 2007	Hartlepool United	1–3	Newcastle United	Hartlepool
19:00	Brown 49'	Report	Ameobi 56', 72'; Owen 58'	Stadium: Victoria Park; Attendance: 6,030; Referee: Clive Oliver

24 July 2007	RKC Waalwijk	1–3	Hartlepool United	Waalwijk
19:00	Barto 43'	Report	Sweeney 23'; Barker 52' (pen.); Moore 78'	Stadium: Mandemakers Stadion

26 July 2007	Kiryat Shmona	2–0	Hartlepool United
19:00		Report

1 August 2007	Hartlepool United	1–1	AZ Alkmaar	Hartlepool
19:00	Liddle 88'	Report	Medunjanin 72'	Stadium: Victoria Park; Attendance: 2,763

2 August 2007	Consett	0–4	Hartlepool United	Consett
15:00		Report	Mackay; Bullock; Maidens; Haigh	Stadium: Belle View Stadium

=== League One ===
==== League table ====
Pos	Team	Pld	W	D	L	GF	GA	GD	Pts
13	Swindon Town	46	16	13	17	63	56	+7	61
14	Leyton Orient	46	16	12	18	49	63	−14	60
15	Hartlepool United	46	15	9	22	62	65	−3	54
16	Bristol Rovers	46	12	17	17	45	53	−8	53
17	Millwall	46	14	10	22	45	61	−16	52

Updated to match(es) played on unknown. Source: The Football League
Rules for classification: 1) points; 2) goal difference; 3) number of goals scored.

==== Results summary ====
Overall								Home						Away					
Pld	W	D	L	GF	GA	GD	Pts	W	D	L	GF	GA	GD	W	D	L	GF	GA	GD
46	15	9	22	63	66	−3	54	11	5	7	40	26	+14	4	4	15	23	40	−17

==== Results by matchday ====
Round	1	2	3	4	5	6	7	8	9	10	11	12	13	14	15	16	17	18	19	20	21	22	23	24	25	26	27	28	29	30	31	32	33	34	35	36	37	38	39	40	41	42	43	44	45	46
Ground	A	H	A	H	A	H	A	H	H	A	H	H	A	A	H	A	A	H	A	H	A	H	H	A	A	H	H	A	H	A	H	A	H	A	A	H	H	A	A	H	H	A	H	A	H	A
Result	L	W	W	W	L	D	W	L	D	L	W	L	W	L	D	L	L	W	L	W	L	D	D	L	D	L	W	L	W	L	W	D	L	L	W	W	W	L	L	W	L	D	L	L	L	D
Position	18	9	5	3	4	3	3	5	5	8	5	12	10	11	13	15	15	11	12	12	13	14	14	15	14	14	14	16	16	17	17	14	17	17	15	14	13	13	13	13	13	13	14	15	15	15

Source: InTheMadCrowd
A = Away; H = Home; W = Win; D = Draw; L = Loss

==== Results ====
11 August 2007 1	Luton Town	2–1	Hartlepool United	Luton
15:00	Currie 36'; Goodall 84'	Report	Barker 90' (pen.)	Stadium: Kenilworth Road; Attendance: 8,013; Referee: Mark Haywood

18 August 2007 2	Hartlepool United	2–1	Doncaster Rovers	Hartlepool
15:00	Antwi 42'; Barker 80' (pen.)	Report	Hayter 70'	Stadium: Victoria Park; Attendance: 5,544; Referee: Mike Dean

25 August 2007 3	Port Vale	0–2	Hartlepool United	Burslem
15:00		Report	Robson 6'; Brown 88'	Stadium: Vale Park; Attendance: 3,978; Referee: Dean Whitestone

1 September 2007 4	Hartlepool United	4–1	Oldham Athletic	Hartlepool
15:00	Moore 15'; Brown 26'; Barker 44' (pen.); Porter 83'	Report	Davies 14'	Stadium: Victoria Park; Attendance: 5,015; Referee: Rob Shoebridge

8 September 2007 5	Leeds United	2–0	Hartlepool United	Leeds
15:00	Kandol 20'; Beckford 50'	Report		Stadium: Elland Road; Attendance: 26,877; Referee: Pat Miller

15 September 2007 6	Hartlepool United	1–1	Swindon Town	Hartlepool
15:00	Porter 68'	Report	McGovern 31'	Stadium: Victoria Park; Attendance: 4,943; Referee: Darren Drysdale

22 September 2007 7	Leyton Orient	2–4	Hartlepool United	Leyton
15:00	Melligan 55'; Daniels 87'	Report	Moore 10', 90'; Brown 51'; Monkhouse 84'	Stadium: Brisbane Road; Attendance: 5,325; Referee: Mark Haywood

29 September 2007 8	Hartlepool United	0–1	Walsall	Hartlepool
15:00		Report	Hall 89'	Stadium: Victoria Park; Attendance: 4,948; Referee: Graham Salisbury

2 October 2007 9	Hartlepool United	2–2	Carlisle United	Hartlepool
19:45	Barker 39'; Mackay 86'	Report	Graham 19', 45'	Stadium: Victoria Park; Attendance: 5,359; Referee: Mike Pike

6 October 2007 10	Nottingham Forest	2–1	Hartlepool United	Nottingham
15:00	Commons 11'; Agogo 83'	Report	Barker 38'	Stadium: City Ground; Attendance: 17,520; Referee: Tony Bates

12 October 2007 11	Hartlepool United	1–0	Bristol Rovers	Hartlepool
19:45	Brown 39'	Report		Stadium: Victoria Park; Attendance: 4,963; Referee: Carl Boyeson

27 October 2007 12	Hartlepool United	1–2	Brighton and Hove Albion	Hartlepool
15:00	Barker 86' (pen.)	Report	Clark 14' (o.g.); Savage 90'	Stadium: Victoria Park; Attendance: 5,619; Referee: Jonathan Moss

3 November 2007 13	Millwall	0–1	Hartlepool United	Bermondsey
15:00		Report	Sweeney 51'	Stadium: The Den; Attendance: 7,731; Referee: Steven Cook

6 November 2007 14	Huddersfield Town	2–0	Hartlepool United	Huddersfield
19:45	Cadamarteri 12'; Beckett 87'	Report		Stadium: Galpharm Stadium; Attendance: 8,154; Referee: Andy Woolmer

18 November 2007 15	Hartlepool United	1–1	Bournemouth	Hartlepool
15:00	Moore 41'	Report	Henry 16'	Stadium: Victoria Park; Attendance: 3,496; Referee: Neil Swarbrick

24 November 2007 16	Gillingham	2–1	Hartlepool United	Gillingham
15:00	Oli 46', 59'	Report	Brown 25'	Stadium: Priestfield Stadium; Attendance: 5,488; Referee: Roger East

27 November 2007 17	Swansea City	1–0	Hartlepool United	Swansea
19:45	Rangel 82'	Report		Stadium: Liberty Stadium; Attendance: 11,421; Referee: Iain Williamson

4 December 2007 18	Hartlepool United	3–1	Tranmere Rovers	Hartlepool
19:45	Liddle 3'; Brown 11'; Porter 58'	Report	Cansdell-Sherriff 54'	Stadium: Victoria Park; Attendance: 3,583; Referee: Karl Evans

8 December 2007 19	Yeovil Town	3–1	Hartlepool United	Yeovil
15:00	Skiverton 27'; Stewart 31'; Owusu 77'	Report	Mackay 10'	Stadium: Huish Park; Attendance: 4,694; Referee: Andy D'Urso

15 December 2007 20	Hartlepool United	3–0	Crewe Alexandra	Hartlepool
15:00	Nelson 67'; Barker 85', 88' (pen.)	Report		Stadium: Victoria Park; Attendance: 3,915; Referee: Mark Haywood

22 December 2007 21	Swindon Town	2–1	Hartlepool United	Swindon
15:00	Cox 49'; Corr 73' (pen.)	Report	Moore 45'	Stadium: County Ground; Attendance: 5,875; Referee: Rob Lewis

26 December 2007 22	Hartlepool United	1–1	Leeds United	Hartlepool
15:00	Nelson 22'	Report	Beckford 90'	Stadium: Victoria Park; Attendance: 7,784; Referee: Lee Mason

29 December 2007 23	Hartlepool United	1–1	Leyton Orient	Hartlepool
15:00	Moore 55'	Report	Chambers 33'	Stadium: Victoria Park; Attendance: 4,379; Referee: Darren Drysdale

1 January 2008 24	Carlisle United	4–2	Hartlepool United	Carlisle
15:00	Garner 42', 69'; Smith 66'; Hackney 90'	Report	Humphreys 39', 48'	Stadium: Brunton Park; Attendance: 7,496; Referee: Mike Jones

12 January 2008 25	Northampton Town	1–1	Hartlepool United	Northampton
15:00	Dolman 16'	Report	Clark 44'	Stadium: Sixfields Stadium; Attendance: 4,639; Referee: Mick Russell

18 January 2008 26	Hartlepool United	0–2	Cheltenham Town	Hartlepool
19:45		Report	Gillespie 11', 79'	Stadium: Victoria Park; Attendance: 4,120; Referee: Scott Mathieson

22 January 2008 27	Hartlepool United	4–3	Southend United	Hartlepool
19:45	Barker 17' (pen.); Brown 47', 53'; Sweeney 89'	Report	Hammell 30' (pen.); Gower 83'; Black 90'	Stadium: Victoria Park; Attendance: 3,217; Referee: Carl Boyeson

29 January 2008 28	Doncaster Rovers	2–0	Hartlepool United	Doncaster
19:45	Wellens 34'; Lockwood 54'	Report		Stadium: Keepmoat Stadium; Attendance: 6,442; Referee: Trevor Kettle

2 February 2008 29	Hartlepool United	4–0	Luton Town	Hartlepool
15:00	Barker 30' (pen.), 73'; Thompson 64'; Porter 64'	Report		Stadium: Victoria Park; Attendance: 3,913; Referee: Neil Swarbrick

9 February 2008 30	Southend United	2–1	Hartlepool United	Southend
15:00	McCormack 61'; Bailey 66'	Report	Sweeney 9'	Stadium: Roots Hall; Attendance: 7,436; Referee: Gavin Ward

12 February 2008 31	Hartlepool United	3–2	Port Vale	Hartlepool
19:45	Barker 68', 90'; Sweeney 87'	Report	Herd 3', 15'	Stadium: Victoria Park; Attendance: 3,630; Referee: Keith Hill

16 February 2008 32	Cheltenham Town	1–1	Hartlepool United	Cheltenham
15:00	Lindegaard 40'	Report	Porter 53'	Stadium: Whaddon Road; Attendance: 3,583; Referee: Clive Penton

22 February 2008 33	Hartlepool United	0–1	Northampton Town	Hartlepool
19:45		Report	Coke 82'	Stadium: Victoria Park; Attendance: 3,945; Referee: Phil Joslin

1 March 2008 34	Bournemouth	2–0	Hartlepool United	Bournemouth
15:00	Vokes 6', 45'	Report		Stadium: Dean Court; Attendance: 3,984; Referee: Danny McDermid

4 March 2008 35	Oldham Athletic	0–1	Hartlepool United	Oldham
19:45		Report	Mackay 74'	Stadium: Boundary Park; Attendance: 3,765; Referee: Andy Woolmer

8 March 2008 36	Hartlepool United	4–0	Gillingham	Hartlepool
15:00	Monkhouse 21'; Porter 26'; Collins 73'; McCunnie 90'	Report		Stadium: Victoria Park; Attendance: 4,055; Referee: Karl Evans

11 March 2008 37	Hartlepool United	2–1	Huddersfield Town	Hartlepool
19:45	Collins 29'; Mackay 49'	Report	Clarke 64'	Stadium: Victoria Park; Attendance: 3,650; Referee: Mick Russell

15 March 2008 38	Tranmere Rovers	3–1	Hartlepool United	Birkenhead
15:00	Greenacre 36'; Nelson 64' (o.g.); Cansdell-Sherriff 90'	Report	Humphreys 71'	Stadium: Prenton Park; Attendance: 5,608; Referee: Dean Whitestone

22 March 2008 39	Crewe Alexandra	3–1	Hartlepool United	Crewe
15:00	Maynard 20', 30'; Pope 85'	Report	Porter 81'	Stadium: Gresty Road; Attendance: 4,412; Referee: Stuart Attwell

24 March 2008 40	Hartlepool United	2–0	Yeovil Town	Hartlepool
15:00	Brown 28'; Porter 18'	Report		Stadium: Victoria Park; Attendance: 3,808; Referee: Carl Boyeson

29 March 2008 41	Hartlepool United	1–3	Swansea City	Hartlepool
15:00	Liddle 1'	Report	Pratley 23', 73'; Scotland 45' (pen.)	Stadium: Victoria Park; Attendance: 4,484; Referee: Lee Probert

5 April 2008 42	Bristol Rovers	0–0	Hartlepool United	Bristol
15:00		Report		Stadium: Memorial Stadium; Attendance: 5,526; Referee: Jarnail Singh

12 April 2008 43	Hartlepool United	0–1	Millwall	Hartlepool
15:00		Report	Simpson 11'	Stadium: Victoria Park; Attendance: 4,077; Referee: Rob Shoebridge

19 April 2008 44	Brighton and Hove Albion	2–1	Hartlepool United	Brighton
15:00	Murray 38'; Cox 89'	Report	Porter 75'	Stadium: Withdean Stadium; Attendance: 6,178; Referee: Ray Lee

26 April 2008 45	Hartlepool United	0–1	Nottingham Forest	Hartlepool
15:00		Report	McGugan 84'	Stadium: Victoria Park; Attendance: 5,206; Referee: Andy Penn

3 May 2008 46	Walsall	2–2	Hartlepool United	Walsall
15:00	Dobson 9'; Mooney 15'	Report	Mackay 19'; Brown 90'	Stadium: Banks's Stadium; Attendance: 5,021; Referee: Mike Thorpe

=== FA Cup ===
11 November 2007 First round	Gainsborough Trinity	0–6	Hartlepool United	Gainsborough
15:00		Report	Barker 8', 25'; Liddle 51'; Moore 70'; Brown 76'; Porter 82'	Stadium: The Northolme; Attendance: 2,402; Referee: Richard Beeby

1 December 2007 Second round	Hereford United	2–0	Hartlepool United	Hereford
15:00	McCombe 45'; Robinson 85'	Report		Stadium: Edgar Street; Attendance: 3,801; Referee: Clive Oliver

=== League Cup ===
14 August 2007 First round	Scunthorpe United	1–2	Hartlepool United	Scunthorpe
19:45	Paterson 51'	Report	Foley 70', 85'	Stadium: Glanford Park; Attendance: 2,965; Referee: Graham Salisbury

28 August 2007 Second round	Sheffield Wednesday	2–1 (a.e.t.)	Hartlepool United	Hillsborough, Sheffield
19:45	Burton 68'; Folly 120'	Report	Moore 55'	Attendance: 8,751; Referee: Andy Penn

=== Football League Trophy ===
4 September 2007 First round	Chesterfield	1–3	Hartlepool United	Chesterfield
19:00	Allison 72'	Report	Foley 34'; Brown 51', 59'	Stadium: Saltergate; Attendance: 2,807; Referee: Steve Bratt

9 October 2007 Second round	Lincoln City	2–5	Hartlepool United	Lincoln
19:00	Stallard 4' (pen.), 77'	Report	Porter 38', 50', 75'; Mackay 69'; Moore 71'	Stadium: Sincil Bank; Attendance: 936; Referee: Mike Thorpe

13 November 2007 Third round	Hartlepool United	1–1 (2–4 p)	Morecambe	Hartlepool
19:00	Barker 13'	Report	Newby 48' (pen.)	Stadium: Victoria Park; Attendance: 2,776; Referee: Anthony Taylor
	Penalties
	Barker (penalty scored); McCunnie (penalty scored); Sweeney (penalty missed); Humphreys (penalty missed)		Artell (penalty scored); Newby (penalty scored); Twiss (penalty scored); Lloyd (penalty scored)

== Squad statistics ==
=== Appearances and goals ===
No.	Pos	Nat	Player	Total		League One		FA Cup		League Cup		Other	
No.	Pos	Nat	Player	Apps	Goals	Apps	Goals	Apps	Goals	Apps	Goals	Apps	Goals
1	GK	(Denmark) DEN	Jan Budtz	34	0	28	0	2	0	2	0	2	0
2	DF	(Scotland) SCO	Jamie McCunnie	36	1	29	1	2	0	2	0	3	0
3	DF	(England) ENG	Robbie Elliott	16	0	15	0	0	0	0	0	1	0
4	MF	(Republic of Ireland) IRL	Willie Boland	38	0	34	0	1	0	2	0	1	0
5	DF	(England) ENG	Michael Nelson	51	2	45	2	2	0	2	0	2	0
6	DF	(England) ENG	Ben Clark	22	1	19	1	1	0	0	0	2	0
7	MF	(England) ENG	Gary Liddle	47	3	41	2	2	1	2	0	2	0
8	MF	(England) ENG	Ritchie Humphreys	50	3	45	3	2	0	1	0	2	0
9	FW	(England) ENG	Richie Barker	43	16	36	13	2	2	2	0	3	1
10	FW	(Australia) AUS	Joel Porter	45	13	39	9	1	1	2	0	3	3
11	MF	(England) ENG	Andy Monkhouse	28	2	25	2	2	0	1	0	0	0
14	FW	(England) ENG	James Brown	41	13	35	10	2	1	2	0	2	2
15	MF	(England) ENG	Antony Sweeney	41	4	36	4	2	0	1	0	2	0
16	DF	(England) ENG	Graeme Lee	3	0	3	0	0	0	0	0	0	0
17	FW	(England) ENG	David Foley	38	3	34	0	0	0	2	2	2	1
18	MF	(England) ENG	Ali Gibb	11	0	7	0	0	0	1	0	3	0
19	MF	(England) ENG	Matty Robson	22	1	17	1	0	0	2	0	3	0
20	DF	(Ghana) GHA	Godwin Antwi	34	1	27	1	2	0	2	0	3	0
21	GK	(England) ENG	Arran Lee-Barrett	19	0	18	0	0	0	0	0	1	0
22	FW	(England) ENG	Ian Moore	30	9	24	6	2	1	2	1	2	1
22	FW	(England) ENG	Tom Craddock	4	0	4	0	0	0	0	0	0	0
23	MF	(England) ENG	Stephen Turnbull	1	0	1	0	0	0	0	0	0	0
24	FW	(England) ENG	Michael Mackay	29	6	24	5	2	0	0	0	3	1
27	DF	(England) ENG	Danny Coles	3	0	3	0	0	0	0	0	0	0
27	DF	(Ireland) EIR	Eddie Nolan	12	0	11	0	1	0	0	0	0	0
27	DF	(England) ENG	Sam Collins	10	2	10	2	0	0	0	0	0	0
28	MF	(England) ENG	Alan Thompson	7	1	7	1	0	0	0	0	0	0

=== Goalscorers ===
Rank	Name	League One	FA Cup	League Cup	Other	Total
1	Richie Barker	13	2	0	1	16
2	James Brown	10	1	0	2	13
2	Joel Porter	9	1	0	3	13
3	Ian Moore	6	1	1	1	9
4	Michael Mackay	5	0	0	1	6
5	Antony Sweeney	4	0	0	0	4
6	David Foley	0	0	2	1	3
6	Ritchie Humphreys	3	0	0	0	3
6	Gary Liddle	2	1	0	0	3
7	Sam Collins	2	0	0	0	2
7	Andy Monkhouse	2	0	0	0	2
7	Michael Nelson	2	0	0	0	2
8	Godwin Antwi	1	0	0	0	1
8	Ben Clark	1	0	0	0	1
8	Jamie McCunnie	1	0	0	0	1
8	Matty Robson	1	0	0	0	1
8	Alan Thompson	1	0	0	0	1

=== Clean Sheets ===
Rank	Name	League One	FA Cup	League Cup	Other	Total
1	Jan Budtz	5	1	0	0	6
2	Arran Lee-Barrett	4	0	0	0	4

=== Penalties ===
Date	Name	Opposition	Scored?
11 August 2007	Richie Barker	Luton Town	✓
18 August 2007	Richie Barker	Doncaster Rovers	✓
1 September 2007	Richie Barker	Oldham Athletic	✓
27 October 2007	Richie Barker	Brighton and Hove Albion	✓
15 December 2007	Richie Barker	Crewe Alexandra	✓
22 January 2008	Richie Barker	Southend United	✓
2 February 2008	Richie Barker	Luton Town	✓
15 March 2008	Tom Craddock	Tranmere Rovers	✗

=== Suspensions ===
Date Incurred	Name	Games Missed	Reason
14 August 2007	Ali Gibb	3	(red card) (vs. Scunthorpe United)
18 August 2007	Robbie Elliott	3	(yellow card) (yellow card) (red card) (vs. Doncaster Rovers)
12 October 2007	Ian Moore	1	Booked
27 October 2007	Jamie McCunnie	1	Booked
27 October 2007	Willie Boland	3	(red card) (vs. Brighton and Hove Albion)
9 February 2008	Sam Collins	3	(red card) (vs. Southend United)
15 March 2008	Jamie McCunnie	1	(red card) (vs. Tranmere Rovers)
