= 2008–09 Hartlepool United F.C. season =

Hartlepool United
2008–09 season
- Owner: IOR
- Chairman: Ken Hodcroft
- Manager: Danny Wilson (until 15 December); Chris Turner (from 15 December)
- Stadium: Victoria Park
- Football League One: 19th
- FA Cup: Fourth round (eliminated by West Ham United)
- Football League Cup: Third round (eliminated by Leeds United)
- Football League Trophy: First round (eliminated by Leicester City)
- Top goalscorer: League: Joel Porter (18); All: Joel Porter (23)
- Highest home attendance: 6,849 (vs West Ham United)
- Lowest home attendance: 2,076 (vs Scunthorpe United)
- Average home league attendance: 3,834
- Biggest win: 4–1 (vs. Cheltenham Town)
- Biggest defeat: 4–1 (vs. Bristol Rovers, Crewe Alexandra and Leeds United)
Home colours	Away colours	Third colours

The 2008–09 season was Hartlepool United's 100th year in existence and their second consecutive season in League One. Along with competing in League One, the club also participated in the FA Cup, League Cup and League Trophy. The season covers the period from 1 July 2008 to 30 June 2009.

== Players ==
As of End of Season.

=== First-team squad ===
Note: Flags indicate national team as defined under FIFA eligibility rules; some limited exceptions apply. Players may hold more than one non-FIFA nationality.

No.	Pos.	Nation	Player
1	GK	DEN	Jan Budtz
2	DF	SCO	Jamie McCunnie
3	DF	ENG	Ritchie Humphreys
4	MF	IRL	Willie Boland
5	DF	ENG	Michael Nelson
6	DF	ENG	Sam Collins
7	MF	ENG	Gary Liddle
8	MF	ENG	Ritchie Jones
10	FW	AUS	Joel Porter
11	MF	ENG	Andy Monkhouse
12	DF	ENG	Ben Clark
14	FW	ENG	James Brown
15	MF	ENG	Antony Sweeney
16	MF	IRL	Alan Power

No.	Pos.	Nation	Player
17	FW	ENG	David Foley
18	FW	ENG	Michael Mackay
19	MF	ENG	Matty Robson
20	FW	WAL	Daniel Nardiello
21	GK	ENG	Arran Lee-Barrett
22	MF	ENG	Jonny Rowell
23	FW	NOR	Rune Lange
24	MF	ENG	Martin Young
26	FW	ENG	Matty Tymon
27	DF	ENG	Joe Tait
29	FW	SCO	Keigan Parker
30	GK	ENG	Mark Cook
34	DF	ENG	Joe Skarz

== Transfers ==
=== Transfers in ===
Date	Position	Player	From	Fee	Ref
5 June 2008	MF	Alan Power	Nottingham Forest	Free	
4 July 2008	MF	Ritchie Jones	Manchester United	Free	
14 July 2008	GK	Mark Cook	Newcastle United	Free	

=== Loans in ===
Date	Position	Player	From	End date	Ref
1 October 2008	FW	Kevin Kyle	Coventry City	31 December 2008	
15 January 2009	FW	Liam Henderson	Watford	25 March 2009	
29 January 2009	FW	Daniel Nardiello	Blackpool	1 June 2009	
2 February 2009	FW	Rune Lange	Vålerenga	1 June 2009	
19 February 2009	FW	Lewis Guy	Doncaster Rovers	19 March 2009	
2 March 2009	FW	Keigan Parker	Huddersfield Town	1 June 2009	
26 March 2009	DF	Joe Skarz	Huddersfield Town	1 June 2009	

=== Transfers out ===
Date	Position	Name	To	Fee	Ref
2 June 2008	MF	Stephen Turnbull	Gateshead	Free	
24 June 2008	MF	Ali Gibb	Retired	—N/a	
16 July 2008	DF	Robbie Elliott	Retired	—N/a	
1 January 2009	FW	Richie Barker	Rotherham United	Free	

== Results ==
=== Pre-season friendlies ===
15 July 2008 Friendly	Greenock Morton	1–2	Hartlepool United	Greenock
19:00	Masterton 44'	Report	Brown 30'; Sweeney 90'	Stadium: Cappielow Park

17 July 2008 Friendly	Falkirk	0–0	Hartlepool United	Falkirk
19:00		Report		Stadium: Falkirk Stadium

19 July 2008 Friendly	Hartlepool United	1–4	Newcastle United	Hartlepool
15:00	Robson 16'	Report	Duff 40', 52', 87'; Guthrie 53'	Stadium: Victoria Park; Attendance: 4,249

26 July 2008 Wilton Trophy	Hartlepool United	0–1	Sunderland	Hartlepool
15:00		Report	Chopra 52' (pen.)	Stadium: Victoria Park; Attendance: 880

27 July 2008 Wilton Trophy	Hartlepool United	1–0	Huddersfield Town	Hartlepool
15:00	Porter 62'	Report		Stadium: Victoria Park

30 July 2008 Friendly	York City	1–0	Hartlepool United	York
19:00	Wilkinson 40'	Report		Stadium: KitKat Crescent; Attendance: 723

2 August 2008 Friendly	Rotherham United	2–3	Hartlepool United	Sheffield
15:00	Taylor 29'; Yates 80'	Report	Porter 25' (pen.); Clark 42'; Brown 68'	Stadium: Don Valley Stadium

=== League One ===
==== League table ====
Pos	Team	Pld	W	D	L	GF	GA	GD	Pts	Promotion or relegation
17	Yeovil Town	46	12	15	19	41	66	−25	51	
18	Stockport County	46	16	12	18	59	57	+2	50 (Note: Stockport County deducted 10 points for entering administration.)	
19	Hartlepool United	46	13	11	22	66	79	−13	50	
20	Carlisle United	46	12	14	20	56	69	−13	50	
21	Northampton Town (R)	46	12	13	21	61	65	−4	49	Relegation to Football League Two

Updated to match(es) played on 2 May 2009. Source: The Football League
Rules for classification: 1) points; 2) goal difference; 3) number of goals scored.
(R) Relegated

==== Results summary ====
Overall								Home						Away					
Pld	W	D	L	GF	GA	GD	Pts	W	D	L	GF	GA	GD	W	D	L	GF	GA	GD
46	13	11	22	66	79	−13	50	8	7	8	45	40	+5	5	4	14	21	39	−18

==== Results by matchday ====
Round	1	2	3	4	5	6	7	8	9	10	11	12	13	14	15	16	17	18	19	20	21	22	23	24	25	26	27	28	29	30	31	32	33	34	35	36	37	38	39	40	41	42	43	44	45	46
Ground	H	A	H	A	A	H	H	A	H	A	A	H	H	A	A	H	A	H	H	A	H	A	H	A	H	H	A	A	H	A	H	H	A	A	H	H	A	A	H	A	H	A	H	A	H	A
Result	W	L	L	W	L	W	D	L	D	L	W	W	W	W	L	L	L	D	D	D	W	L	L	L	W	D	L	D	D	L	D	L	W	D	W	L	L	L	L	L	W	D	L	W	L	L
Position	1	9	16	7	14	6	9	12	12	14	14	13	12	9	10	12	12	12	13	13	10	13	15	15	12	14	16	13	13	17	15	16	15	15	15	15	15	15	15	16	16	18	18	16	18	19

Source: InTheMadCrowd
A = Away; H = Home; W = Win; D = Draw; L = Loss

==== Results ====
9 August 2008 1	Hartlepool United	4–2	Colchester United	Hartlepool
15:00	Brown 13', 14'; Boland 66'; Jones 76'	Report	Gillespie 78' (pen.), 90'	Stadium: Victoria Park; Attendance: 3,831; Referee: Anthony Taylor

16 August 2008 2	Tranmere Rovers	1–0	Hartlepool United	Birkenhead
15:00	Curran 23'	Report		Stadium: Prenton Park; Attendance: 5,418; Referee: Jonathan Moss

23 August 2008 3	Hartlepool United	0–1	Stockport County	Hartlepool
15:00		Report	Rowe 90'	Stadium: Victoria Park; Attendance: 3,945; Referee: Graham Salisbury

30 August 2008 4	Peterborough United	1–2	Hartlepool United	Peterborough
15:00	Boyd 78'	Report	Monkhouse 58'; Barker 59'	Stadium: London Road; Attendance: 5,728; Referee: Andy Hall

6 September 2008 5	Millwall	2–0	Hartlepool United	Bermondsey
15:00	Grabban 5'; Alexander 41'	Report		Stadium: The Den; Attendance: 7,207; Referee: Steve Bratt

12 September 2008 6	Hartlepool United	4–1	Cheltenham Town	Hartlepool
19:45	Brown 20'; Gallinagh 48' (o.g.); Monkhouse 62'; Mackay 87'	Report	Owusu 89'	Stadium: Victoria Park; Attendance: 3,637; Referee: Carl Boyeson

20 September 2008 7	Hartlepool United	3–3	Oldham Athletic	Hartlepool
15:00	Monkhouse 48'; Sweeney 49'; Porter 53' (pen.)	Report	Hughes 23'; Taylor 44', 58'	Stadium: Victoria Park; Attendance: 4,507; Referee: Tony Bates

27 September 2008 8	Leicester City	1–0	Hartlepool United	Leicester
15:00	Oakley 3'	Report		Stadium: Walkers Stadium; Attendance: 18,578; Referee: Mike Thorpe

3 October 2008 9	Hartlepool United	3–3	Swindon Town	Hartlepool
19:45	Porter 53', 82', 90'	Report	Cox 5', 39', 52'	Stadium: Victoria Park; Attendance: 4,018; Referee: Karl Evans

10 October 2008 10	Northampton Town	1–0	Hartlepool United	Northampton
19:45	Hawley 17'	Report		Stadium: Sixfields Stadium; Attendance: 5,277; Referee: Graham Horwood

18 October 2008 11	Walsall	2–3	Hartlepool United	Walsall
15:00	Ricketts 5'; Ibehre 13'	Report	Sweeney 72'; Robson 76'; Brown 83'	Stadium: Banks's Stadium; Attendance: 4,142; Referee: Craig Pawson

21 October 2008 12	Hartlepool United	5–3	Huddersfield Town	Hartlepool
19:45	Kyle 26', 86'; Brown 40'; Porter 83' (pen.), 90'	Report	Dickinson 8', 44'; Craney 38'	Stadium: Victoria Park; Attendance: 3,771; Referee: Scott Mathieson

25 October 2008 13	Hartlepool United	1–0	Brighton and Hove Albion	Hartlepool
15:00	Kyle 12'	Report		Stadium: Victoria Park; Attendance: 3,962; Referee: Darren Drysdale

28 October 2008 14	Carlisle United	0–1	Hartlepool United	Carlisle
19:45		Report	Brown 28'	Stadium: Brunton Park; Attendance: 5,637; Referee: Mike Riley

1 November 2008 15	Leyton Orient	1–0	Hartlepool United	Leyton
15:00	Boyd 81'	Report		Stadium: Brisbane Road; Attendance: 3,638; Referee: Gavin Ward

15 November 2008 16	Hartlepool United	1–3	Milton Keynes Dons	Hartlepool
15:00	O'Hanlon 47' (o.g.)	Report	Lewington 37'; Wright 39'; Powell 90'	Stadium: Victoria Park; Attendance: 4,021; Referee: Darren Drysdale

22 November 2008 17	Leeds United	4–1	Hartlepool United	Leeds
15:00	Beckford 15', 90'; Delph 50'; Becchio 64'	Report	Porter 25'	Stadium: Elland Road; Attendance: 21,182; Referee: Graham Salisbury

25 November 2008 18	Hartlepool United	1–1	Bristol Rovers	Hartlepool
19:45	Nelson 6'	Report	Hughes 25'	Stadium: Victoria Park; Attendance: 3,171; Referee: Anthony Taylor

6 December 2008 19	Hartlepool United	0–0	Yeovil Town	Hartlepool
15:00		Report		Stadium: Victoria Park; Attendance: 3,393; Referee: Kevin Friend

13 December 2008 20	Hereford United	1–1	Hartlepool United	Hereford
15:00	Guinan 18'	Report	Beckwith 48' (o.g.)	Stadium: Edgar Street; Attendance: 2,490; Referee: Chris Sarginson

19 December 2008 21	Hartlepool United	3–0	Southend United	Hartlepool
19:45	Kyle 4', 61'; Robson 36'	Report		Stadium: Victoria Park; Attendance: 3,123; Referee: Jonathan Moss

26 December 2008 22	Scunthorpe United	3–0	Hartlepool United	Scunthorpe
15:00	McCann 32'; Hooper 47'; Hayes 90' (pen.)	Report		Stadium: Glanford Park; Attendance: 5,347; Referee: Trevor Kettle

28 December 2008 23	Hartlepool United	1–4	Crewe Alexandra	Hartlepool
15:00	Porter 48'	Report	Brayford 45'; Nelson 56' (o.g.); Murphy 61'; Miller 83'	Stadium: Victoria Park; Attendance: 3,877; Referee: Karl Evans

12 January 2009 24	Oldham Athletic	2–1	Hartlepool United	Oldham
19:45	Hughes 21'; Smalley 52'	Report	Lomax 67' (o.g.)	Stadium: Boundary Park; Attendance: 4,211; Referee: Carl Boyeson

16 January 2009 25	Hartlepool United	2–0	Northampton Town	Hartlepool
19:45	Porter 5', 56'	Report		Stadium: Victoria Park; Attendance: 3,814; Referee: Russell Booth

27 January 2009 26	Hartlepool United	2–2	Carlisle United	Hartlepool
19:45	Monkhouse 59'; Porter 85'	Report	Bridge-Wilkinson 12'; Taylor 40'	Stadium: Victoria Park; Attendance: 3,765; Referee: Martin Atkinson

31 January 2009 27	Brighton and Hove Albion	2–1	Hartlepool United	Brighton
15:00	Forster 59'; Andrew 90'	Report	Nelson 20'	Stadium: Withdean Stadium; Attendance: 5,784; Referee: Dean Whitestone

3 February 2009 28	Huddersfield Town	1–1	Hartlepool United	Huddersfield
19:45	Nelson 9' (o.g.)	Report	Jones 37'	Stadium: Galpharm Stadium; Attendance: 9,294; Referee: Darren Deadman

7 February 2009 29	Hartlepool United	2–2	Walsall	Hartlepool
15:00	Gerrard 36' (o.g.); Porter 64'	Report	Deeney 10'; Williams 82'	Stadium: Victoria Park; Attendance: 3,286; Referee: Andy Woolmer

14 February 2009 30	Milton Keynes Dons	3–1	Hartlepool United	Milton Keynes
15:00	Gerba 37', 90'; Lewington 86'	Report	Lange 36'	Stadium: Stadium MK; Attendance: 8,657; Referee: Oliver Langford

17 February 2009 31	Hartlepool United	2–2	Leicester City	Hartlepool
19:45	Porter 32' (pen.); Monkhouse 90'	Report	Howard 28', 80' (pen.)	Stadium: Victoria Park; Attendance: 4,068; Referee: Nigel Miller

21 February 2009 32	Hartlepool United	0–1	Leyton Orient	Hartlepool
15:00		Report	Mkandawire 83'	Stadium: Victoria Park; Attendance: 3,678; Referee: Neil Swarbrick

24 February 2009 33	Swindon Town	0–1	Hartlepool United	Swindon
19:45		Report	Clark 90' (pen.)	Stadium: County Ground; Attendance: 6,010; Referee: Andy Hall

28 February 2009 34	Colchester United	1–1	Hartlepool United	Colchester
15:00	Vernon 45'	Report	Nelson 71'	Stadium: Community Stadium; Attendance: 5,158; Referee: Mike Jones

3 March 2009 33	Hartlepool United	2–1	Tranmere Rovers	Hartlepool
19:45	Nelson 69'; Clark 83' (pen.)	Report	Chorley 70'	Stadium: Victoria Park; Attendance: 3,033; Referee: Carl Boyeson

7 March 2009 36	Hartlepool United	1–2	Peterborough United	Hartlepool
15:00	Monkhouse 38'	Report	Keates 11'; Boyd 48'	Stadium: Victoria Park; Attendance: 3,722; Referee: Dave Foster

10 March 2009 37	Stockport County	2–1	Hartlepool United	Stockport
19:45	McSweeney 55'; Vincent 65'	Report	Mackay 85'	Stadium: Edgeley Park; Attendance: 4,790; Referee: Phil Gibbs

14 March 2009 38	Cheltenham Town	2–0	Hartlepool United	Cheltenham
15:00	Hammond 35' (pen.); Bignall 89'	Report		Stadium: Whaddon Road; Attendance: 2,945; Referee: Darren Deadman

21 March 2009 39	Hartlepool United	2–3	Millwall	Hartlepool
15:00	Sweeney 23', 25'	Report	Harris 61', 67', 72'	Stadium: Victoria Park; Attendance: 3,601; Referee: Trevor Kettle

27 March 2009 40	Southend United	3–2	Hartlepool United	Southend
19:45	Barnard 15' (pen.); Moussa 18'; Robinson 43'	Report	Porter 32' (pen.); Jones 62'	Stadium: Roots Hall; Attendance: 7,227; Referee: Mick Russell

4 April 2009 41	Hartlepool United	4–2	Hereford United	Hartlepool
15:00	Porter 9', 13'; Collins 79'; Sweeney 81'	Report	Brandy 11'; Pugh 28'	Stadium: Victoria Park; Attendance: 3,579; Referee: Clive Oliver

11 April 2009 42	Crewe Alexandra	0–0	Hartlepool United	Crewe
15:00		Report		Stadium: Alexandra Stadium; Attendance: 4,477; Referee: Graham Scott

13 April 2009 43	Hartlepool United	2–3	Scunthorpe United	Hartlepool
15:00	Nelson 18'; Nardiello 77'	Report	McCann 8'; Hayes 55', 80'	Stadium: Victoria Park; Attendance: 3,998; Referee: Scott Mathieson

18 April 2009 44	Yeovil Town	2–3	Hartlepool United	Yeovil
15:00	Tomlin 7'; Townsend 57'	Report	Porter 13', 45'; Nardiello 72'	Stadium: Huish Park; Attendance: 4,232; Referee: Jarnail Singh

25 April 2009 45	Hartlepool United	0–1	Leeds United	Hartlepool
15:00		Report	Beckford 60'	Stadium: Victoria Park; Attendance: 6,402; Referee: Colin Webster

2 May 2009 46	Bristol Rovers	4–1	Hartlepool United	Bristol
15:00	Kuffour 3'; Duffy 5'; Lambert 46'; Lescott 48'	Report	Nardiello 28'	Stadium: Memorial Stadium; Attendance: 7,363; Referee: Grant Hegley

=== FA Cup ===
8 November 2008 First round	Brighton and Hove Albion	3–3	Hartlepool United	Brighton
15:00	McLeod 19'; Cox 38'; Fleetwood 78'	Report	Hawkins 53' (o.g.); Brown 55'; Monkhouse 69'	Stadium: Withdean Stadium; Attendance: 2,545; Referee: Andy Woolmer

18 November 2008 replay	Hartlepool United	2–1	Brighton and Hove Albion	Hartlepool
19:45	Porter 67' (pen.); Liddle 70'	Report	Forster 28'	Stadium: Victoria Park; Attendance: 3,288; Referee: Mark Haywood

29 November 2008 Second round	Fleetwood Town	2–3	Hartlepool United	Fleetwood
12:45	Bell 14'; Warlow 66'	Report	Mackay 17', 47'; Porter 56'	Stadium: Highbury Stadium; Attendance: 3,280; Referee: Clive Oliver

3 January 2009 Third round	Hartlepool United	2–0	Stoke City	Hartlepool
15:00	Nelson 49'; Foley 76'	Report		Stadium: Victoria Park; Attendance: 5,367; Referee: Mark Halsey

24 January 2009 Fourth round	Hartlepool United	0–2	West Ham United	Hartlepool
12:45		Report	Behrami 44'; Noble 45' (pen.)	Stadium: Victoria Park; Attendance: 6,849; Referee: Lee Mason

=== League Cup ===
12 August 2008 First round	Hartlepool United	3–0	Scunthorpe United	Hartlepool
19:45	Porter 50'; Foley 58'; Brown 75'	Report		Stadium: Victoria Park; Attendance: 2,076; Referee: Neil Swarbrick

26 August 2008 Second round	Hartlepool United	3–1 (a.e.t.)	West Bromwich Albion	Hartlepool
19:45	Porter 61'; Foley 102'; Barker 105'	Report	Koren 86'	Stadium: Victoria Park; Attendance: 3,387; Referee: Mark Haywood

23 September 2008 Third round	Leeds United	3–2	Hartlepool United	Leeds
19:45	Snodgrass 14'; Showunmi 57'; Robinson 90'	Report	Monkhouse 2'; Porter 33'	Stadium: Elland Road; Attendance: 14,599; Referee: Andy Penn

=== Football League Trophy ===
2 September 2008 First round	Hartlepool United	0–3	Leicester City	Hartlepool
19:00		Report	Howard 52'; Adams 66'; Fryatt 87'	Stadium: Victoria Park; Attendance: 2,807; Referee: Rob Shoebridge

== Squad statistics ==
=== Appearances and goals ===
No.	Pos	Nat	Player	Total		League One		FA Cup		League Cup		Other	
No.	Pos	Nat	Player	Apps	Goals	Apps	Goals	Apps	Goals	Apps	Goals	Apps	Goals
1	GK	(Denmark) DEN	Jan Budtz	10	0	10	0	0	0	0	0	0	0
2	DF	(Scotland) SCO	Jamie McCunnie	20	0	15	0	2	0	2	0	1	0
3	DF	(England) ENG	Ritchie Humphreys	54	0	45	0	5	0	3	0	1	0
4	MF	(Republic of Ireland) IRL	Willie Boland	4	1	3	1	0	0	1	0	0	0
5	DF	(England) ENG	Michael Nelson	55	6	46	5	5	1	3	0	1	0
6	DF	(England) ENG	Sam Collins	46	0	40	0	2	0	3	0	1	0
7	MF	(England) ENG	Gary Liddle	52	1	43	0	5	1	3	0	1	0
8	MF	(England) ENG	Ritchie Jones	42	3	36	3	4	0	2	0	0	0
9	FW	(England) ENG	Richie Barker	12	2	8	1	0	0	3	1	1	0
10	FW	(Australia) AUS	Joel Porter	47	23	38	18	5	2	3	3	1	0
11	MF	(England) ENG	Andy Monkhouse	51	8	44	6	5	1	2	1	0	0
12	DF	(England) ENG	Ben Clark	40	2	35	2	5	0	0	0	0	0
14	FW	(England) ENG	James Brown	24	8	18	6	2	1	3	1	1	0
15	MF	(England) ENG	Antony Sweeney	53	5	44	5	5	0	3	0	1	0
16	MF	(Ireland) EIR	Alan Power	6	0	4	0	0	0	1	0	1	0
17	FW	(England) ENG	David Foley	30	3	23	0	4	1	2	2	1	0
18	FW	(England) ENG	Michael Mackay	30	4	23	2	5	2	2	0	0	0
19	MF	(England) ENG	Matty Robson	38	2	29	2	5	0	3	0	1	0
20	FW	(Wales) WAL	Daniel Nardiello	12	3	12	3	0	0	0	0	0	0
21	GK	(England) ENG	Arran Lee-Barrett	46	0	37	0	5	0	3	0	1	0
22	MF	(England) ENG	Jonny Rowell	7	0	6	0	0	0	0	0	1	0
23	FW	(Norway) NOR	Rune Lange	3	1	3	1	0	0	0	0	0	0
28	FW	(England) ENG	Lewis Guy	4	0	4	0	0	0	0	0	0	0
29	FW	(Scotland) SCO	Keigan Parker	9	0	9	0	0	0	0	0	0	0
34	FW	(England) ENG	Liam Henderson	9	0	8	0	1	0	0	0	0	0
34	FW	(Scotland) SCO	Kevin Kyle	15	5	15	5	0	0	0	0	0	0
34	DF	(England) ENG	Joe Skarz	7	0	7	0	0	0	0	0	0	0

=== Goalscorers ===
Rank	Name	League One	FA Cup	League Cup	Other	Total
1	Joel Porter	18	2	3	0	23
2	James Brown	6	1	1	0	8
2	Andy Monkhouse	6	1	1	0	8
3	Michael Nelson	5	1	0	0	6
4	Kevin Kyle	5	0	0	0	5
4	Antony Sweeney	5	0	0	0	5
5	Michael Mackay	1	2	0	0	3
6	David Foley	0	1	2	0	3
6	Ritchie Jones	3	0	0	0	3
6	Daniel Nardiello	3	0	0	0	3
7	Richie Barker	1	0	1	0	2
7	Ben Clark	2	0	0	0	2
7	Matty Robson	2	0	0	0	2
8	Willie Boland	1	0	0	0	1
8	Sam Collins	1	0	0	0	1
8	Rune Lange	1	0	0	0	1
8	Gary Liddle	0	1	0	0	1

=== Clean Sheets ===
Rank	Name	League One	FA Cup	League Cup	Other	Total
1	Arran Lee-Barrett	4	1	1	0	6
2	Jan Budtz	3	0	0	0	3

=== Penalties ===
Date	Name	Opposition	Scored?
20 September 2008	Joel Porter	Oldham Athletic	✓
21 October 2008	Joel Porter	Huddersfield Town	✓
18 November 2008	Joel Porter	Brighton and Hove Albion	✓
17 February 2009	Joel Porter	Leicester City	✓
24 February 2009	Ben Clark	Swindon Town	✓
3 March 2009	Ben Clark	Tranmere Rovers	✓
21 March 2009	Joel Porter	Millwall	✗
27 March 2009	Joel Porter	Southend United	✓
18 April 2009	Joel Porter	Yeovil Town	✓

=== Suspensions ===
Date Incurred	Name	Games Missed	Reason
15 November 2008	Sam Collins	1	(yellow card) (yellow card) (red card) (vs. Milton Keynes Dons)
3 February 2009	Daniel Nardiello	3	(red card) (vs. Huddersfield Town)
27 March 2009	Arran Lee-Barrett	3	(red card) (vs. Southend United)
