= Arran Lee-Barrett =

English footballer

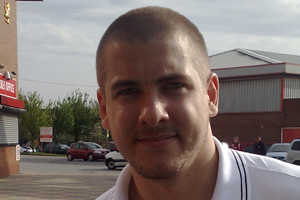
- Lee-Barrett in 2008

Personal information
- Date of birth: 28 February 1984 (age 42)
- Place of birth: Ipswich, England
- Height: 6 ft 2 in (1.88 m)
- Position: Goalkeeper

Youth career
- 1994–2000: Ipswich Town
- 2000–2002: Norwich City

Senior career*
Years	Team	Apps	(Gls)
2002–2003	Norwich City	0	(0)
2003	→ Chelmsford City (loan)	1	(0)
2003–2005	Cardiff City	0	(0)
2005–2007	Weymouth	19	(0)
2007	Coventry City	0	(0)
2007–2009	Hartlepool United	55	(0)
2009–2013	Ipswich Town	38	(0)
2013	Millwall	0	(0)
2013–2014	Bolton Wanderers	0	(0)
Total		113	(0)

International career
2006	England C	1	(0)
- * Club domestic league appearances and goals

Arran Lee-Barrett (born 28 February 1984) is an English former professional footballer who played as a goalkeeper.

He made his senior debut for Cardiff City in 2004. After two years at Cardiff he signed for Weymouth where he spent another two years before joining Coventry City in 2007. He did not make an appearance for Coventry, joining Hartlepool United following the end of his short-term contract. He spent two seasons at Hartlepool before joining Ipswich Town in 2009. He spent four years at Ipswich. Following his release from Ipswich he had short spells at Millwall at Bolton Wanderers during the 2013–14 season.

== Club career ==
=== Early career ===
When he was 10, Lee-Barrett joined his local club Whitton Sports Centre and took the position of goalkeeper. Shortly after he was offered a place at Ipswich Town's academy where he played alongside later-England international Darren Bent.

After leaving Ipswich he was offered an apprenticeship at Fulham and Norwich, he chose Norwich as he preferred the atmosphere there. However, he failed to break into the reserve team and was second choice reserve keeper behind future England international Robert Green. In February 2003, Lee-Barrett joined Chelmsford City on loan, making two appearances, one in the league and one in the Southern League Cup. He was released by Norwich at the end of the 2002–03 season and had a trial at Chelsea.

=== Cardiff City ===
He was offered a one-year contract with Cardiff after impressing during a trial and was coached by George Wood. He spent most of his time at Cardiff as third choice keeper, mainly playing for the reserves. While playing for the reserves Lee-Barrett helped Cardiff win the Pontins Holiday Combination. Cardiff manager Lennie Lawrence decided to release the young keeper believing that he was better off getting games.

=== Weymouth ===
Torquay, Doncaster and Shrewsbury all showed an interest in Lee-Barrett. Although he trained with Torquay, he moved to Weymouth due to the offer of first team football. He made 19 league appearances and 2 appearances in the FA Cup, helping Weymouth to win the Nationwide Conference South.

=== Coventry City ===
In January 2007, Lee-Barrett signed for Coventry City on loan as emergency cover for Luke Steele due to the injury of other Coventry keeper Andy Marshall. After his loan spell he signed permanently after being offered a temporary contract. However at the end of the season he was not offered a new contract and was released after failing to break into the first team. After releasing Lee-Barrett, Coventry City manager Iain Dowie revealed that he was impressed with his "attitude and professionalism" and wished him all the best.

=== Hartlepool United ===
Shortly after Lee-Barrett was signed by Hartlepool after being recommended by Hartlepool's goalkeeping coach George Wood who had previously coached him at Cardiff. For his first season at Hartlepool he was given the number 21 shirt. On his debut Lee-Barrett performed well against Newcastle, making some impressive saves and keeping a clean sheet in the half that he played.

After playing Harlepool's first game of the season, a 2–1 loss to Luton Town, he was dropped, with Danny Wilson picking Jan Budtz over him for the Pools next fixtures. He was released from his contract on 6 May 2009 after being deemed surplus to requirements.

=== Ipswich Town ===
On 21 August 2009, it was announced that Lee-Barrett had signed for the Championship team Ipswich Town, on a short-term deal. This came a day after Shane Supple had retired from the game aged 22. Lee-Barrett covered first-choice goalkeeper Richard Wright and was included in the squad that travelled to West Brom the next day. He made his debut for Ipswich on 29 November against Cardiff City, coming off the bench in the 25th minute for the injured Richard Wright. Ipswich won the game 2–1. Following that game, Ipswich enquired into the possibility of bringing in a keeper on loan to replace Wright, despite the loan window not being open. This request was denied, leaving Lee-Barrett and Ian McLoughlin, the youth team goalkeeper, as the only two goalkeepers on professional contracts at the club. Ipswich's next game was away at Bristol City where Lee-Barrett kept a clean sheet. In January 2010, Lee-Barrett was rewarded with a new 18-month contract at Ipswich. He was offered a further contract extension in April 2011.

=== Millwall ===
On 16 August 2013, he made the move to Millwall covering for Stephen Bywater and Andy Marshall after David Forde had picked up an injury. He did not make a first team appearance whilst with the Lions but did act as an unused substitute for Steve Lomas' team.

=== Bolton Wanderers ===
On 24 October 2013, he signed a short-term contract with Bolton Wanderers to provide competition for Andy Lonergan after both Ádám Bogdán and Jay Lynch had been ruled out of action with knee and back injuries respectively. He linked up again with his former manager Lennie Lawrence, an assistant manager to Dougie Freedman at Bolton. He later signed a contract extension until the end of the season. Following the conclusion of the season, Bolton Wanderers offered Lee-Barrett a new one-year deal but on 1 July, Bolton confirmed that he had left the club.

== International career ==
While at Weymouth Lee-Barrett was selected for the England National Game team, which consisted of England's best non-league players and made his debut for them against the Netherlands in November 2006.

== Personal life ==
Since retiring from professional football Lee-Barrett resided in Suffolk with his now ex partner and two children. Lee-Barrett is the cousin of Liam Barrett who also played in Ipswich Town's youth team and who now runs U.S Sports Scholarships, a company that helps place student-athletes at American universities.

== Career statistics ==
Appearances and goals by club, season and competition
Club	Season	League			FA Cup		League Cup		Other		Total	
Club	Season	Division	Apps	Goals	Apps	Goals	Apps	Goals	Apps	Goals	Apps	Goals
Cardiff City	2003–04	First Division	1	0	0	0	0	0	0	0	1	0
Cardiff City	2004–05	First Division	0	0	0	0	0	0	0	0	0	0
Cardiff City	Total		1	0	0	0	0	0	0	0	1	0
Weymouth	2005–06	Conference South	0	0	0	0	0	0	0	0	0	0
Weymouth	2006–07	Conference Premier	19	0	2	0	0	0	0	0	21	0
Weymouth	Total		19	0	2	0	0	0	0	0	21	0
Coventry City	2006–07	Championship	0	0	0	0	0	0	—		0	0
Hartlepool United	2007–08	League One	18	0	0	0	0	0	1 (Note: Appearance in Football League Trophy)	0	19	0
Hartlepool United	2008–09	League One	37	0	5	0	3	0	1	0	46	0
Hartlepool United	Total		55	0	5	0	3	0	2	0	65	0
Ipswich Town	2009–10	Championship	13	0	2	0	0	0	—		15	0
Ipswich Town	2010–11	Championship	7	0	0	0	0	0	—		7	0
Ipswich Town	2011–12	Championship	18	0	1	0	1	0	—		20	0
Ipswich Town	2012–13	Championship	0	0	0	0	0	0	—		0	0
Ipswich Town	Total		38	0	3	0	1	0	0	0	42	0
Millwall	2013–14	Championship	0	0	0	0	0	0	—		0	0
Bolton Wanderers	2013–14	Championship	0	0	0	0	0	0	—		0	0
Career total			113	0	10	0	4	0	2	0	129	0
