= Michael Nelson (footballer) =

English footballer (born 1980)

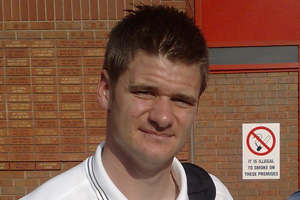
- Nelson in 2008

Personal information
- Full name: Michael John Nelson
- Date of birth: 23 March 1980 (age 46)
- Place of birth: Gateshead, England
- Height: 6 ft 2 in (1.88 m)
- Position: Defender

Team information
- Current team: South Shields (16s-19s Academy Coach)

Senior career*
Years	Team	Apps	(Gls)
2000–2001	Bishop Auckland	46	(2)
2001–2003	Bury	72	(8)
2003–2009	Hartlepool United	259	(14)
2009–2011	Norwich City	39	(5)
2011–2012	Scunthorpe United	30	(1)
2012–2013	Kilmarnock	36	(2)
2013	Bradford City	13	(0)
2013–2014	Hibernian	35	(2)
2014–2015	Cambridge United	33	(3)
2015–2018	Barnet	97	(2)
2018–2019	Chesterfield	13	(0)
2019–2020	Gateshead	10	(1)
2020	Blyth Spartans	3	(0)
2026	Easington Colliery	1	(0)
Total		687	(40)

Managerial career
- 2020–2021: Blyth Spartans
- 2022: Hartlepool United (joint caretaker)
- 2022–2023: Scunthorpe United (interim)
- * Club domestic league appearances and goals

Michael John Nelson (born 23 March 1980) is an English former professional footballer who played as a defender. He is 16-19s Academy Coach at South Shields.

Nelson started his career at semi-professional level, playing for Spennymoor United, Leek Town and Bishop Auckland. His performances earned him a move to Bury in 2001. After winning the Bury Player of the Year award in 2002–03, Nelson moved to third tier Hartlepool United. In his first two seasons with the club, Hartlepool would reach the play-offs in both seasons, before being relegated in 2005–06. However, Hartlepool secured an immediate return to League One as runners-up with Nelson earning a place in the PFA Team of the Year for his performances. In 2009, he would earn a move to Norwich City where he would spend the next two seasons. He subsequently joined Championship club Scunthorpe United. Nelson had two spells in Scotland with Kilmarnock and Hibernian in between a brief spell with Bradford City. In 2014, he signed for League Two club Cambridge United, where he would spend one season. He signed for League Two Barnet where he would play for three seasons. He dropped into non-League football in 2018. He had spells with Chesterfield, Gateshead and Blyth Spartans before retiring in 2020 having made over 700 career appearances.

== Club career ==
=== Bishop Auckland ===
Born in Gateshead, Tyne and Wear, Nelson started his playing career as a semi-professional, playing for non-League teams such as Spennymoor United, Leek Town and Bishop Auckland. He was at Portsmouth for two-and-a-half years but then manager Alan Ball released him because of financial restrictions. During his time at Bishop Auckland, Nelson became a first team regular, making forty–eight appearances and scoring two times in all competitions. Nelson's performances attracted the attention of League clubs who sent scouts to watch him. Nelson was given a trial at Hartlepool United but he was not offered a contract by manager Chris Turner.

=== Bury ===
However Nelson was offered a contract at Bury by manager Andy Preece after Bury scout Peter Ward convinced him to give Nelson a chance. Immediately after joining the club, he was called up to the first team. On 27 April 2001, Nelson quickly made an impact on his Bury debut when he "struck a sweet half volley into the top corner", in a 1–1 draw against Wycombe Wanderers. Nelson made his second appearance for the club in the last game of the season, in a 3–1 loss against Brentford.

Ahead of the 2001–02 season, manager Andy Preece offered Nelson a new contract. On 2 August 2001, he signed a two–year contract with the club. On 18 August 2001, Nelson scored his first goal of the season, in a 2–1 loss against Queens Park Rangers. Teammate Steve Redmond praised his performance, describing him as "an old fashioned centre half and he'll keep learning all the time and hopefully he'll progress throughout the season." Nelson gradually became a first team regular, forming a centre–back partnership with either Redmond or Danny Swailes. On 8 September, however, Nelson suffered what he described as "the worst injury of his career" after suffering a collapsed lung and several cracked ribs following an accidental collision with goalkeeper Paddy Kenny, in a 2–1 loss against Wigan Athletic. Nelson had to have a drain inserted into his chest for several days while he was hospitalised. The injury threatened to keep him out for three months but Nelson was able to resume training less than three weeks later. After being out for a month, he made his return from injury, coming on as a 79th-minute substitute, in a 3–1 loss against Cambridge United on 13 October 2001. Following a 5–1 loss against Brentford on 23 October, his performance, along with Georgios Syros came under heavy criticism by manager Andy Preece. Despite this, Nelson continued to be in the first team and signed a two–year contract extension with the club on 13 February 2002. Nelson suffered a hamstring injury that saw him ruled out throughout March. On 1 April, he returned to the starting line–up from injury and helped Bury win 2–0 against Brentford. On 15 April, however, Nelson was unable to help the club avoid relegation to Division Three after losing 3–1 against Colchester United. During his first full season at Bury, Nelson managed to play 30 of the club's 46 league matches, scoring twice in the process.

At the start of the 2002–03 season, Nelson was initially dropped from Bury's first-team squad, but he quickly regained his first team place, forming a defensive partnership with Danny Swailes. On 5 October, Nelson scored his first goal of the season, scoring from a header, in a 3–1 loss against Southend United. On 18 January, he suffered a knee injury during a 0–0 draw against Boston United and did not play for the rest of the month. On 4 February, Nelson returned to the starting line–up from injury and helped the club win 2–1 against Cambridge United. He was appointed as Bury's captain and his performances earned him the respect of the club's players and fans. On 26 April, he scored his fifth goal of the season, in a 2–1 win against Southend United, a win that earned Bury a spot in the play–offs. During that season, Bury manager Andy Preece hailed Nelson as "the best centre-half in Division Three". However, Bury failed to gain promotion to Division Two as the club missed out during the play-offs following their 3–1 loss on aggregate against Bournemouth. His second season turned out to be even more successful as he played in 40 of Bury's 46 league matches, scoring five goals. For his performance, Nelson won all four of the club's Player of the Season awards, including Player of the Year Awards. He also won Bury's Player of the Month for January and March along the way.

=== Hartlepool United ===
Following the conclusion of the 2003–04 season, Nelson was offered the chance to play in a higher division by several Division One clubs. On 27 June 2003, he joined Hartlepool United on the same day that Neale Cooper was appointed manager for a fee of around £70,000. Upon joining the club, manager Cooper said he expected Nelson to "be a major star for Hartlepool United" next season, describing him as "a very commanding and is a big strong lad" and "can get up and down the pitch and is dominating in the air". Cooper also believe "that he will get better and better with every game". Nelson was seen as a replacement for Graeme Lee who had joined Sheffield Wednesday. He was given the number five shirt ahead of the new season.

Nelson started strongly for Hartlepool when he scored the winner from 30 yards during his debut in the club's 4–3 win over Peterborough United. This goal was nominated for Hartlepool's Goal of the Season. Nelson began to form a strong partnership with Chris Westwood and the pair played together for the majority of the club's matches. His performances saw him voted as the September Player of the Month. He helped the club keep three consecutive clean sheets in the league between 28 December 2003 and 17 January 2004. Nelson started in all matches until receiving a suspension for accumulating five yellow cards. On 27 March, however, Nelson suffered a leg injury and was substituted, in a 2–1 loss against Brentford. On 24 April 2004, he made his return from a four-week absence, coming on as a 75th-minute substitute in a 2–0 win against Rushden & Diamonds. In the last game of the season, Nelson played in the 1–1 draw against Swindon Town which earned Hartlepool a play–off position. After regaining his fitness due to a knock, he played in both legs of the club's play-off semi-final match against Bristol City, as Hartlepool lost 3–2 on aggregate. Nelson was in contention for Hartlepool's Fans and Players' Player of the season but he missed out to Jim Provett on both occasions. During the 2003–04 season, Nelson made 48 appearances, scoring three times in all competitions.

At the start of the 2004–05 season, the partnership between Nelson and Westwood was praised by manager Cooper. He started in every match until missing one match for picking up five yellow cards so far this season. However, Nelson failed to maintain this through to the season and he handed in a transfer request. His agent claimed that he had been "promised" a better deal. This triggered a feud with Hartlepool chairman Ken Hodcroft, who criticised Nelson and his agent. Nelson was missing in several of Hartlepool's matches at the beginning of December and was rumoured to be signing for Hull City for a fee of around £100,000. However, Nelson withdrew his transfer request and was reinstalled into the starting line-up against Wrexham on 18 December 2004. On 27 November, he scored his first goal of the season, scoring from a header, in a 3–2 win against Bournemouth. Amid the transfer saga and another injury concern, Nelson went back into the starting line-up for the rest of the season. In the last game of the season, Nelson helped Hartlepool draw 2–2 against Bournemouth to earn their place in the play-offs. He played in both legs of the semi–finals against Tranmere Rovers which Hartlepool eventually won 6–5 on penalties. In the League One play-off final against Sheffield Wednesday, Nelson started the match, as Hartlepool United loss 4–2 in front of a crowd of 59,808 at the Millennium Stadium. During the 2004–05 season, he made 56 appearances, playing every league match that season, scoring once in all competitions.

Ahead of the 2005–06 season, Nelson signed a new three-year contract that would tie him to the club until 2008 after Hartlepool made an improved offer, ending months of speculation over his future. Following the departure of his centre–back partner Westwood, he formed a new partnership with Neill Collins at the start of the season. On 15 October, however, Nelson received his first red card for Hartlepool after he retaliated and elbowed Jack Lester during the club's 2–0 defeat against Nottingham Forest. In an FA Cup first round match against Dagenham & Redbridge, he scored his first goal of the season in a 2–1 win. Nelson continued to form a centre–back partnership with either Collins or Ben Clark. He then scored two goals in two matches against Nottingham Forest and Brentford with the club hoping to avoid relegation. However, Hartlepool were relegated on the last game of the season after drawing 1–1 against Port Vale. His 2005–06 season did not impact his season despite being out on four occasions along the way. Nelson went on to make 47 appearances and score three times in all competitions.

At the start of the 2006–07 season, Nelson mostly played alongside Ben Clark in central defence. Nelson was also given the captain's armband in the absence on Michael Barron. He helped Hartlepool United keep five consecutive clean sheets. On 26 December 2006, Nelson suffered medial ligament injuries in his left knee and was substituted in the 33rd minute, in a 2–0 win against Grimsby Town. On 6 January 2007, he made his return to the starting line–up, in a 1–1 draw against Shrewsbury Town. However, his return was short–lived when Nelson picked his fifth yellow card of the season, triggering a suspension. On 27 January 2007, he made his return to the starting line–up from suspension, and helped the club keep a clean sheet, in a 1–0 win against his former club, Bury. Despite his absence, Nelson was nominated and won League Two's Player of the Month for January. On 10 February 2007, he scored his first goal of the season, scoring from a header, in a 3–1 win against Walsall. Following his return from injury, Nelson continued to play a major part in Hartlepool's 18 game unbeaten run. On 9 April 2007, he started the whole game and helped keep a clean sheet in a 1–0 win against Accrington Stanley, resulting in Hartlepool United earning promotion back to League One. On 28 April 2007, however, he suffered a medial knee ligament damage and was substituted in the 31st minute, in a 2–0 loss against Rochdale. His injury caused him to miss the last game of the season, where the club finished in second place in the league following a 2–1 loss against Bristol Rovers. During the 2006–07 campaign, Nelson made forty–nine appearances, scoring once in all competitions. For his performance, he shared the Players' Player of the Year award with Gary Liddle. Nelson was also named in the PFA League Two Team of the Year for the 2006–07 season, alongside teammates Ritchie Humphreys and Andy Monkhouse.

Ahead of the 2007–08 season, Nelson was linked with a move away from Hartlepool although he ultimately remained at the club. Nelson scored two more goals by the end of the year, coming against Crewe Alexandra and Leeds United. He also continued to be a stand-in captain in absence of Barron. Nelson also started in every league match until he missed a match against Cheltenham Town on 16 February 2008, due to suspension. On 1 March 2008, he started the whole game in his 200th league appearances for the club, losing 2–0 against Bournemouth. During the 2007–08 season, Nelson made fifty–one appearances, scoring two times in all competitions. With his contract expiring at the end of the 2007–08 season, he was signed a contract extension with Hartlepool, keeping him with the club for another season.

On 25 November 2008, he scored his first goal of the 2008–09 season, in a 1–1 draw against Bristol Rovers. With his contract expiring at the end of the 2008–09 season, Nelson was linked with a move to Leicester City in the January transfer window, but manager Danny Wilson dismissed suggestions of the player leaving Hartlepool United. On 3 January 2009, he scored his second goal of the season, in a 2–0 win against Premier League side Stoke City in the third round of the FA Cup. On 24 January 2009, Nelson was penalised for handball, resulting in a penalty, in a 2–0 loss against Premier League West Ham United in the fourth round of the FA Cup. After the match, Nelson criticised referee Lee Mason for his decision, calling it "a killer for us right on half-time". He scored two goals in two matches between 28 February 2009 and 3 March 2009 against Colchester United and Tranmere Rovers respectively. On 27 March 2009, Nelson started the whole game in his 300th appearance for the club, in a 3–2 loss against Southend United. Despite having seven stitches in a head wound sustained during Hartlepool's loss against Leeds United, Nelson passed fit and started the match against Bristol Rovers on the last game of the season, as the club lost 4–1 but nevertheless avoided relegation. Throughout the 2008–09 season, he made fifty–five appearances (having played every league matches that season) scoring six times in all competitions. For his performance, Nelson was awarded Hartlepool United's away Player of the Year.

With his contract expiring at the end of the 2008–09 season, Nelson was offered a new contract by the club. By June, the chances of the player staying was "receding", with clubs, such as, Hibernian, Scunthorpe United and Norwich CIty were interested in signing him. On 15 June 2009, it was reported by The Northern Echo that he had rejected a new contract offer and was expected to leave the club.

=== Norwich City ===
On 19 June 2009, Nelson agreed to join Norwich City, who had just been relegated to League One, on a two-year deal once his contract expired at Hartlepool at the end of June.

He made his debut for the club and conceded seven goals in a 7–1 opening-day thrashing at the hands of Colchester United. Nelson did not play for the next five matches for Norwich City. He did not play for the first team again until the game against his former club Hartlepool United later in August, in which he scored an overhead kick to score his first goal for the club and put the Canaries on course for a 2–0 win at Victoria Park. On 14 September 2009, however, Nelson suffered a heel injury and was substituted in the 60th-minutes, in a 2–1 loss against Milton Keynes Dons. After the match, it was announced that he would be out for a month. On 24 October 2009, he returned from injury, coming on as a late substitute, in a 1–0 win against Swindon Town. Nelson established himself as a regular starter following an injury to teammate Jens Berthel Askou in December. He subsequently formed a strong central defensive partnership with Gary Doherty as the Canaries surged up the League One table, overhauling runaway leaders Leeds United in the process. On 17 April 2010, Nelson scored the only goal in a 1–0 victory at Charlton Athletic which secured Norwich City's return to the Championship at the first attempt. His performance throughout April earned him the League One Player of the Month for April. Throughout the 2009–10 season, he made 36 appearances, scoring three times in all competitions.

In his second season, Nelson scored his fourth goal against Watford in a 3–2 loss in Norwich City's first match of the season. On 21 August 2010, however, Nelson suffered ankle injury during a 2–0 win against Swansea City. The injury saw him out for three months. By November, Nelson made his return to training after a recovery from ankle injury. On 18 December 2010, Nelson returned to the first team for the first time in three months, staring the whole game, in a 2–1 win against Coventry City. Nelson scored his fifth and last goal for Norwich against Sheffield United in a 4–2 win in a follow–up match. Following his return from injury, Nelson was targeting the first team but was deemed surplus to requirements by Canaries boss Paul Lambert as Lambert favoured Elliott Ward and Leon Barnett as their first choice centre backs.

=== Scunthorpe United ===
Nelson left the Canaries on deadline day in January 2011 for an undisclosed fee, joining Scunthorpe United, just an hour from the deadline.

On 5 February 2011, he made his debut for The Iron, starting the whole game, in a 5–1 defeat to Hull City. On 30 April 2011, he started in the club's 5–1 defeat to Nottingham Forest that saw the club relegated to League One. During the 2010–11 season, Nelson made twenty appearances in all competitions for Scunthorpe.

In the opening game of the 2011–12 season, Nelson scored his first goal for Scunthorpe United in a 1–1 draw against Wycombe Wanderers. However, he soon lost his first-team place and found his playing time, coming from the substitute bench. Scunthorpe's poor form continued and at the end of 2011, the club was just above the relegation zone to League Two. In January 2012, Nelson was strongly linked with move away from Scunthorpe following a restructuring programme at the club. By the time he left the club in January, Nelson had made sixteen appearances, scoring once in all competitions.

=== Kilmarnock ===
On 14 January 2012, Nelson signed for Scottish Premier League side Kilmarnock on a two-and-a-half-year contract. Upon joining the club, manager Kenny Shiels described new signing Nelson as 'quality' and expected the player to be a good asset in the second half of the season. Shortly joining Kilmarnock, Nelson revealed that then Norwich City manager Paul Lambert made a recommendation of him to join the club.

On 28 January 2012, he made his debut for Kilmarnock, starting the whole game in the central defence position, in a 1–0 win against Ayr United in the semi–finals of the Scottish League Cup to help the club reach the final. Since joining Kilmarnock, Nelson quickly established himself in the first team, forming a centre–back partnership with Mohamadou Sissoko. On 18 March 2012, he played in the Scottish League Cup final, which the club won after beating Celtic 1–0. On 28 April 2012, Nelson scored his first goal for the club in a thrilling 4–3 victory over Inverness Caledonian Thistle. During the 2011–12 season, Nelson made eighteen appearances, scoring once in all competitions.

On 28 August 2012, Nelson scored his first goal of the 2012–13 season in the second round of the Scottish League Cup, in a 2–1 loss against Stenhousemuir. On 27 October 2012, his partnership with O'Leary was praised by the Scottish media following their performances, in a 2–0 win against Celtic. By the time Nelson left Kilmarnock in January, he had made 23 appearances, scoring twice in all competitions. During his time at the club, Nelson began to take up coaching lessons in hopes of becoming a manager one day.

=== Bradford City ===
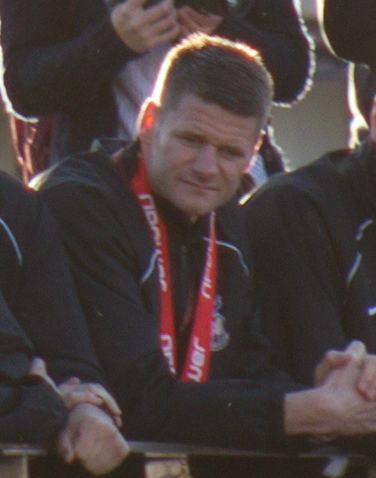
Nelson with the victory parade that followed Bradford City's victory in the Football League Two play-off final.

On 15 January 2013, Nelson agreed to join Bradford City on an 18-month deal for an undisclosed fee. Upon leaving Kilmarnock, manager Kenny Shiels was asked about Nelson's departure by the Daily Record and said that he wanted to be close with his children and described his departure as a "big loss".

On 2 February 2013, Nelson made his debut for the club, starting the whole game in a 2–2 draw away to Fleetwood Town. Nelson lost his first-team place in the starting eleven and was placed on the substitute bench towards the end of the season. However, he regained his first team place in the club's four remaining matches of the 2012–13 season and helped Bradford City earn a place in the League Two play-offs. Nelson appeared an unused substitute as the club won promotion to League One by winning the Football League Two play-off final following a 3–0 victory against Northampton Town. During his time at Bradford City, he made fifteen appearances in all competitions.

=== Hibernian ===
On 1 August 2013, Nelson signed a two-year deal with Scottish Premiership side Hibernian, moving from Bradford City for a nominal transfer fee. Upon joining the club, manager Pat Fenlon said that Nelson is a player that he wanted to include, citing "his experience in the league with four qualities to Hibernian – size, physicality, experience and leadership".

He made his debut for the club, starting the whole game, in a 1–0 loss against Motherwell in the opening game of the season. On 19 October 2013, however, he sustained eye injury after an aerial clash with Amido Baldé during a 1–1 draw against Celtic. As a result, Nelson was out for a month. On 2 January 2014, he set up a goal for James Collins to break the deadlock after 61 minutes to the match, in a 2–1 win against local rival, Hearts. He also captained a number of matches for Hibernian towards the end of the season. In the Premiership play–off final against Hamilton Academical, he played in both legs, as the club were relegated to the Scottish Championship, losing on penalties following a 2–2 draw on aggregate in both legs. Throughout the 2013–14 season, Nelson made 37 appearances in total, scoring three times in all competitions.

Ahead of the 2014–15 season, Nelson's future at Hibernian was in doubt following the club's relegation to the Scottish Championship. Amid this speculation, he made two appearances for the club. During 2–1 loss against local rivals, Hearts on 17 August 2014, Nelson received an elbow in the face by Osman Sow that saw him sent–off, but he quickly recovered. He subsequently left Hibernian after agreeing to terminate his contract mutually.

=== Cambridge United ===
On 26 August 2014, Nelson signed a one-year contract with League Two side Cambridge United shortly after agreeing mutual termination with his previous club Hibernian.

On 30 August 2014, he made his debut for the club, starting the whole game, in a 5–0 win against Carlisle United. Two weeks later on 13 September 2014, Nelson scored his first goal for Cambridge United, in a 3–2 win against Dagenham & Redbridge. During the 2014–15 season, Nelson made forty appearances, scoring three times in all competitions. On 6 May 2015, the club did not offer him a new deal when his contract expired.

=== Barnet ===
Nelson impressed during a trial at Barnet during pre-season and signed a one-year deal on 3 August 2015. Upon joining the club, he was reunited with Martin Allen, whom he knows during their time at Portsmouth.

On 11 August 2015, he made his debut for Barnet, starting a match in a 2–1 win against Millwall in the first round of the League Cup. Since joining the club, Nelson found himself in and out of the starting line–up, which saw him placed on the substitute bench. On 19 December 2015, however, he suffered a dislocated shoulder injury and was substituted at half time, in a 4–2 win against Crawley Town. Initially, Nelson was given all clear with a shoulder injury, but he was out for three months. On 13 February 2016, Nelson scored on his return from injury, in a 2–0 win against Dagenham & Redbridge. Following his return from injury, he regained his first team place, playing in the centre–back position, but his form later dipped towards the end of the season and was placed on the substitute bench. During the 2015–16 season, Nelson made 32 appearances, scoring once in all competitions. On 25 May 2016, he signed a one–year contract extension with Barnet.

Ahead of the 2016–17 season, Nelson was appointed as the new captain of Barnet following the departure of Andy Yiadom. On 15 March 2017, Nelson scored his first goal of the season - an equalising header, in a 2–2 draw against Yeovil Town on 15 March 2017. Since the start of the 2016–17 season, Nelson started in every match until he was dropped to the substitute bench for three matches during April. On 22 April 2017, Nelson returned to the starting line–up and helped the club keep a clean sheet, in a 2–0 win against his former club, Hartlepool United. In his second season at Barnet, Nelson made 46 appearances, scoring once in all competitions. On 1 June 2017, he signed a new deal at the end of the season and extended his contract into a third year in summer 2017, as well as, taking up a role as the club's under-23 team coach.

At the start of the 2017–18 season, Nelson continued to fight for his first team place in the centre–back position, as well as, regaining his captaincy. On 13 January 2018, he made his 100th appearance for Barnet, losing 2–0 against Crawley Town. Following the appointment of Graham Westley as head coach, Nelson was appointed as his assistant for the first team. He previously coached the club's U23 side between September and March. But Nelson returned to playing duties following the appointment of Martin Allen and on 30 March 2018, he made his first appearances for Barnet in two months, starting a match and played 77 minutes before being substituted, in a 2–1 win against Crewe Alexandra. However, Nelson was unable to help the club avoid relegation despite winning their last three league matches of the season. Throughout the 2017–18 season, he made 29 appearances in all competitions.

Barnet claimed to have offered Nelson a new contract at the end of the 2017–18 season, but this was disputed by Nelson himself.

=== Chesterfield ===
Nelson signed a one-year deal with Chesterfield on 22 May 2018. Upon joining the club, manager Martin Allen said: "Michael is a very old player with great experience and good knowledge. He is a leader of men, and he knows how to win games. He is as fit as a butcher's dog, and he is a great man to work with."

Nelson made his debut for Chesterfield, starting the whole game, and helped the club keep a clean sheet, in a 1–0 win against Ebbsfleet United in the opening game of the season. By October, he was dropped from the starting eleven squad and did not play for three months. On 4 December 2018, Nelson was placed on a transfer list by manager Allen. But on 26 December 2018, he made an appearance for Chesterfield against Solihull Moors, only to come off in the 9th minute of a 4–0 loss, in what turned out to be his last appearance for the club. Following this, Nelson spent the rest of the 2018–19 season, combining his role as Chesterfield player with coaching staff duties. In total, he made thirteen appearances in all competitions. Shortly after, Nelson was released by the club.

=== Gateshead ===
In the summer of 2019, Nelson signed for his home town club, Gateshead, as a player-coach. On 10 August 2019, he made his début for the club, starting a match and played 67 minutes before being substituted, in a 0–0 draw at AFC Telford United. On 1 September 2019, Nelson scored his first goal for Gateshead, in a 2–0 win against Brackley Town. During his time at the club, he made thirteen appearances, scoring once in all competitions.

== Coaching career ==
=== Early coaching career ===
Nelson was appointed assistant manager of Stevenage on 17 January 2020, once again assisting Graham Westley whom he had worked alongside as player-coach at Barnet. Nelson left the club a month later after Alex Revell was appointed manager.

=== Blyth Spartans ===
Nelson returned to playing when he joined Blyth Spartans on 26 February 2020 until the end of the season. A week later on 4 March 2020, he was then made player-manager after the departure of Lee Clark. Three days later on 7 March 2020, Nelson's first game in charge came against Brackley Town, as the club loss 5–2. However, the 2019–20 season was ended early because of the COVID-19 pandemic. On 1 May 2020, he was appointed as a permanent manager at Blyth Spartans. Upon doing so, Nelson retired from professional football.

Ahead of the 2020–21 season, Nelson made new signings, with a help from the "Impact of the Future Fund" and "the 1899 Club" support groups and praised the groups for their role in helping him bring in new players. However, Blyth Spartans struggled in the league, winning only once in fourteen league matches before the season was ended early because of the COVID-19 pandemic for the second time. During the 2020–21 season, he once came out of retirement as a replacement for the suspended Matthew Elsdon and played in the FA Cup match against Marske United, as the club loss 1–0. Following Blyth Spartans' injury crisis, Nelson made his first league appearance for the club, starting the whole game, in a 3–0 loss against York City on 2 December 2020. However in a match against Boston United on 7 December 2020, he suffered an injury and was substituted in the 25th-minute, in a 1–0 loss and his final appearance as professional footballer. Following this, Nelson made three more appearances for Blyth Spartans, as he returned to the dugout as manager. However, the season was interrupted due to the COVID-19 pandemic and league was declared null and void on 18 February 2021.

The start of the 2021–22 season saw Nelson off to good start, helping Blyth Spartans earn nine points in the first six league matches to the season, winning only two matches. On 17 November 2021, with Blyth in the relegation zone of the National League North, he left the club by mutual consent.

=== Post-Blyth Spartans career ===
On 1 December 2021, Nelson joined his former club Hartlepool United as assistant manager to the newly appointed Graeme Lee. Following the departure of Lee, he was named as the club's caretaker manager on 5 May 2022. Nelson took charge of Hartlepool United one game only; a 2–0 home defeat to Colchester United on 7 May 2022. He left the club on 7 June 2022.

On 1 September 2022, Nelson returned to another one of his former clubs when he joined Scunthorpe United to assist interim manager Tony Daws. On 28 November 2022, Daws stepped down to return to his role as academy manager with Nelson becoming interim manager. His first match as an interim manager took place on 3 December 2022, in a 4–1 loss against Notts County. He had to wait until 7 January 2023 to get his first win as the Irons manager when the club beat Maidenhead United 3–0. Following Scunthorpe United's takeover and appointment of a new permanent manager in Jimmy Dean, Nelson was retained as head coach. On 7 June 2023, he announced his departure from the club, citing personal reasons.

On 15 June 2023, Nelson left Scunthorpe to take up a job closer to his home, becoming Football Academy Manager at Park View Academy of Sport while also working as a first team coach at part-time side Chester-Le-Street United.

In July 2026, Nelson joined National League North club South Shields as a 16s-19s academy coach.

== Personal life ==
Nelson and his wife Dawn have two children. He revealed he has a tattoo on his arm of his first son, who was stillborn in 2002.

== Career statistics ==
Appearances and goals by club, season and competition
Club	Season	League			National cup		League cup		Other		Total	
Club	Season	Division	Apps	Goals	Apps	Goals	Apps	Goals	Apps	Goals	Apps	Goals
Bury	2000–01	Division Two	2	1	0	0	0	0	0	0	2	1
Bury	2001–02	Division Two	31	2	2	0	1	0	2 (Note: Appearances in Football League Trophy)	0	36	2
Bury	2002–03	Division Three	39	5	1	0	3	0	3 (Note: One appearance in Football League Trophy, two appearances in Division Three play-offs)	0	46	5
Bury	Total		72	8	3	0	4	0	5	0	84	8
Hartlepool United	2003–04	Division Two	40	3	3	0	2	0	3 (Note: One appearance in Football League Trophy, two appearances in Division Two play-offs)	0	48	3
Hartlepool United	2004–05	League One	43	1	5	0	2	0	6 (Note: Three appearances in Football League Trophy, three appearances in League One play-offs)	0	56	1
Hartlepool United	2005–06	League One	43	2	2	1	2	0	0	0	47	3
Hartlepool United	2006–07	League Two	42	1	3	0	2	0	2	0	49	1
Hartlepool United	2007–08	League One	45	2	2	0	2	0	2	0	51	2
Hartlepool United	2008–09	League One	46	5	5	1	3	0	1	0	55	6
Hartlepool United	Total		259	14	20	2	13	0	14	0	306	16
Norwich City	2009–10	League One	31	3	2	0	0	0	3	0	36	3
Norwich City	2010–11	Championship	8	2	0	0	1	0	—		9	2
Norwich City	Total		39	5	2	0	1	0	3	0	45	5
Scunthorpe United	2010–11	Championship	20	0	0	0	0	0	—		20	0
Scunthorpe United	2011–12	League One	10	1	2	0	2	0	2	0	16	1
Scunthorpe United	Total		30	1	2	0	2	0	2	0	36	1
Kilmarnock	2011–12	Scottish Premier League	15	1	1	0	2	0	—		18	1
Kilmarnock	2012–13	Scottish Premier League	21	1	1	0	1	1	—		23	2
Kilmarnock	Total		36	2	2	0	3	1	—		41	3
Bradford City	2012–13	League Two	13	0	0	0	0	0	1 (Note: Appearances in League Two play-offs)	0	14	0
Hibernian	2013–14	Scottish Premiership	33	2	1	1	1	0	2 (Note: Appearances in Scottish Premiership relegation play-offs)	0	37	3
Hibernian	2014–15	Scottish Championship	2	0	0	0	0	0	0	0	2	0
Hibernian	Total		35	2	1	1	1	0	2	0	39	3
Cambridge United	2014–15	League Two	33	3	5	0	0	0	0	0	38	3
Barnet	2015–16	League Two	27	1	2	0	2	0	1	0	32	1
Barnet	2016–17	League Two	43	1	1	0	1	0	1 (Note: Appearance in EFL Trophy)	0	46	1
Barnet	2017–18	League Two	27	0	0	0	1	0	1	0	29	0
Barnet	Total		97	2	3	0	4	0	3	0	107	2
Chesterfield	2018–19	National League	13	0	0	0	—		0	0	13	0
Gateshead	2019–20	National League North	10	1	2	0	—		1	0	13	1
Blyth Spartans	2019–20	National League North	0	0	0	0	—		0	0	0	0
Blyth Spartans	2020–21	National League North	3	0	1	0	—		0	0	4	0
Blyth Spartans	Total		3	0	1	0	—		0	0	4	0
Career total			640	38	41	3	28	1	31	0	740	42

== Managerial statistics ==
Updated 30 April 2024:

Team	Duration		Record				
Team	From	To	G	W	D	L	%
Blyth Spartans	4 March 2020	1 December 2021	37	6	5	26	16.2
Hartlepool United (joint caretaker)	5 May 2022	3 June 2022	1	0	0	1	0.0
Scunthorpe United (interim)	28 November 2022	28 January 2023	9	2	2	5	22.2
Chester-le-Street United	15 June 2023	Present	44	13	8	23	29.5
Total			91	21	15	55	23.1

== Honours ==
Hartlepool United

- Football League Two second-place promotion: 2006–07

Norwich City

- Football League One: 2009–10

Kilmarnock

- Scottish League Cup: 2011–12

Bradford City

- Football League Two play-offs: 2013

Individual

- Bury Player of the Season: 2002–03
- PFA Team of the Year: 2006–07 League Two
