= Willie Boland =

Irish footballer (born 1975)

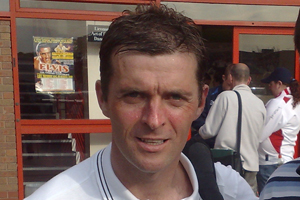
- Boland in 2008

Personal information
- Full name: William John Boland
- Date of birth: 6 August 1975 (age 51)
- Place of birth: Ennis, Ireland
- Height: 1.75 m (5 ft 9 in)
- Position: Midfielder

Senior career*
Years	Team	Apps	(Gls)
1992–1999	Coventry City	63	(0)
1999–2006	Cardiff City	209	(3)
2006–2009	Hartlepool United	64	(1)
2010	Limerick	1	(0)
Total		337	(4)

International career
1991–1992	Republic of Ireland U17	3	(0)
1993–1997	Republic of Ireland U21	12	(0)

Managerial career
- 2017: Limerick (interim)
- * Club domestic league appearances and goals

William John Boland (born 6 August 1975) is an Irish football coach and former professional footballer.

He notably played in the Premier League for Coventry City, and in the Football League for Cardiff City and Hartlepool United and in his native Ireland for Limerick. He was capped by both the Republic of Ireland U17 and Republic of Ireland U21 teams.

Following his retirement he became a youth coach at Middlesbrough before taking up a role as academy director of Limerick. In 2017 he spent a short spell as interim manager of the club.

== Playing career ==
Born in Ennis, County Clare, Boland started his career with Coventry City, making over 60 league appearances, before moving to Cardiff City in 1999. Despite scoring on his debut on 7 August 1999 in a 1–1 draw with Millwall, Boland initially struggled to find form in Cardiff, his time not helped by a broken leg early into his second season at the club, sustained in a match against Barnet. It was not until he recovered from the injury that he began to settle in the side and the following season he was awarded the club's player of the year award due to his performances in a three-man midfield alongside Mark Bonner and Graham Kavanagh. After helping the team win promotion to Division One he gradually fell out of favour under new manager Dave Jones.

The Irishman was Cardiff City's longest serving player, having been at the club for seven years and starting over 200 games, before leaving when his contract expired in the summer of 2006. He spent a short unsuccessful time on trial at Swansea City before in August 2006 signing for Hartlepool United.

Boland became Danny Wilson's first signing. His tough-tackling is something that Wilson had been looking to add to the squad and he agreed terms at The Vic after being out of contract at Cardiff in the summer. His leadership skills and experience were another part of the reason that Pools were quick to move for him when he became available.

Boland is a hard hitting midfielder with excellent player qualities; he has represented his country at Under-21 level.

Boland announced his retirement from professional football on 21 October 2009 having not featured in a professional match for 14 months due to knee problems. His last appearance came on 23 August 2008 in a 1–0 defeat to Stockport County. He scored his only goal for Hartlepool in a 4–2 win over Colchester United on 9 August 2008.

Boland came out of retirement in May 2010 to sign for Limerick. Boland made his League of Ireland debut as a substitute, which turned out to be his only appearance, at Athlone Town on 8 May.

== Coaching career ==
Boland moved into coaching and worked with the Middlesbrough under-14 team as well as working at Hartlepool College.

On 5 April 2017, Boland was appointed interim manager of the side following the departure of Martin Russell. He spent one month in charge of the side before the club appointed Neil McDonald as Russell's permanent replacement.

Boland is currently the Director of Coaching at UCD and Mount Merrion.

== Career statistics ==
Club	Season	Division	League		FA Cup		League Cup		Other		Total	
Club	Season	Division	Apps	Goals	Apps	Goals	Apps	Goals	Apps	Goals	Apps	Goals
Coventry City	1992–93	Premier League	1	0	0	0	0	0	0	0	1	0
Coventry City	1993–94	Premier League	27	0	0	0	3	0	0	0	30	0
Coventry City	1994–95	Premier League	12	0	0	0	1	0	0	0	13	0
Coventry City	1995–96	Premier League	3	0	0	0	0	0	0	0	3	0
Coventry City	1996–97	Premier League	1	0	0	0	0	0	0	0	1	0
Coventry City	1997–98	Premier League	19	0	1	0	2	0	0	0	22	0
Coventry City	1998–99	Premier League	0	0	0	0	1	0	0	0	1	0
Coventry City	Total		63	0	1	0	7	0	0	0	71	0
Cardiff City	1999–00	Division Two	28	1	3	0	3	0	1	0	35	1
Cardiff City	2000–01	Division Three	25	1	3	0	1	0	0	0	29	1
Cardiff City	2001–02	Division Two	42	1	4	0	1	0	2	0	49	1
Cardiff City	2002–03	Division Two	41	0	4	1	2	0	3	0	50	1
Cardiff City	2003–04	First Division	37	0	1	0	2	0	0	0	40	0
Cardiff City	2004–05	Championship	21	0	0	0	3	0	0	0	24	0
Cardiff City	2005–06	Championship	15	0	0	0	1	0	0	0	16	0
Cardiff City	Total		209	3	15	1	13	0	6	0	243	4
Hartlepool United	2006–07	League Two	27	0	3	0	0	0	0	0	30	0
Hartlepool United	2007–08	League One	34	0	1	0	2	0	1	0	38	0
Hartlepool United	2008–09	League One	3	1	0	0	1	0	0	0	4	1
Hartlepool United	Total		64	1	4	0	3	0	1	0	72	1
Limerick	2010	League of Ireland First Division	1	0	0	0	0	0	0	0	1	0
Career total			337	4	20	1	23	0	7	0	387	4

== Honours ==
Cardiff City

- Football League Second Division play-offs: 2003
- FAW Premier Cup: 2001–02
