= Ben Clark (footballer, born 1983) =

English footballer and manager

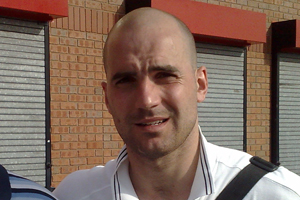
- Clark in 2008

Personal information
- Full name: Benjamin Clark
- Date of birth: 24 January 1983 (age 43)
- Place of birth: Consett, England
- Height: 6 ft 2 in (1.88 m)
- Positions: Centre-back; centre midfielder

Team information
- Current team: Gateshead (caretaker manager)

Youth career
- 1999: Manchester United
- 1999–2000: Sunderland

Senior career*
Years	Team	Apps	(Gls)
2000–2004	Sunderland	8	(0)
2004–2010	Hartlepool United	162	(6)
2010–2016	Gateshead	238	(5)
2016	South Shields	4	(0)
Total		412	(11)

Managerial career
- 2019: Gateshead
- 2024: Gateshead (caretaker)
- 2026: Gateshead (caretaker)
- * Club domestic league appearances and goals

Benjamin Clark (born 24 January 1983) is an English former professional footballer who played as a centre-back. During his career, he played for Sunderland, Hartlepool United, Gateshead and latterly South Shields. He is currently First-Team Coach at Gateshead.

== Club career ==
=== Manchester United ===
Clark began his career as a trainee for Manchester United, but became homesick and signed for Sunderland in August 1999.

=== Sunderland ===
He made his Sunderland debut in a 2–1 League Cup away win at Luton Town in September 2000. However, Clark saw his opportunities at Sunderland limited and he only made 11 appearances in his first three seasons and mainly found himself playing for the reserves. Despite the lack of appearances for his league side, Clark represented England as a defender up until under-20 level and he captained the under-19s.

Mick McCarthy tipped Clark to play an important role in Sunderland's promotion campaign. However, he decided to let Clark look for new clubs to pursue his career. In the 2004–05 season, Clark was signed by Neale Cooper and moved to Hartlepool United.

=== Hartlepool United ===
Clark made his Hartlepool debut against Peterborough but a series of injuries disrupted his first season at the club and Clark found it difficult to gain a regular starting place in the team. He was commonly used as a utility player to cover injuries in defence and midfield. Despite this Clark went on to make 25 league appearances and 6 in cup competitions.

In the 2006–07 season, he played a key role in central defence alongside Michael Nelson as Hartlepool won promotion from League Two as runners-up. The pair played a major part in the club's 18-game unbeaten run. Clark made 35 appearances in the 2008–09 season but the arrival of Sam Collins meant that Clark was moved back into midfield. After losing his place in the side, Clark spent much of the 2009–10 season as a substitute and was released at the end of the season.

=== Gateshead ===
On 14 June 2010, Clark signed for Conference National side Gateshead and was named captain on 10 August 2010, replacing Kris Gate. Clark made his debut for Gateshead on 14 August 2010 against Kettering Town. Clark scored his first goal for Gateshead on 22 February 2011 in a 4–1 win against Kettering Town at Rockingham Road. He made 53 appearances during his first season at the club, missing only 3 games, and won Gateshead's Player of the Year award.

He agreed a new one-year contract with the club in May 2012 to cover the 2012–13 season.

On 23 November 2015, Clark was named co-caretaker manager of Gateshead alongside Micky Cummins following the departure of manager Malcolm Crosby.

At the beginning of the 2016–17 season, Clark became a dual registered player for both Gateshead and Northern League South Shields. He played four times for the Mariners, before retiring after suffering a groin injury in September 2016.

== Coaching career ==
On 1 October 2024, following the departure of Rob Elliot as first-team coach, it was announced that Clark would take charge of first team matters at Gateshead on an interim basis. On 4 October 2026, Clark again become caretaker manager, following the departure of Lee Cattermole.

== Career statistics ==
Club	Season	Division	League		FA Cup		League Cup		Other^{[B]}		Total	
Club	Season	Division	Apps	Goals	Apps	Goals	Apps	Goals	Apps	Goals	Apps	Goals
Sunderland	2000–01	Premier League	0	0	0	0	1	0	0	0	1	0
Sunderland	2001–02	Premier League	0	0	0	0	0	0	0	0	0	0
Sunderland	2002–03	Premier League	1	0	1	0	0	0	0	0	2	0
Sunderland	2003–04	Division One	5	0	1	0	2	0	0	0	8	0
Sunderland	2004–05	Championship	2	0	0	0	1	0	0	0	3	0
Sunderland	Total		8	0	2	0	4	0	0	0	14	0
Hartlepool United	2004–05	League One	25	0	6	0	0	0	1	0	32	0
Hartlepool United	2005–06	League One	32	0	1	0	0	0	1	0	34	0
Hartlepool United	2006–07	League Two	40	3	3	0	1	0	2	0	46	3
Hartlepool United	2007–08	League One	19	1	1	0	0	0	2	0	22	1
Hartlepool United	2008–09	League One	35	2	5	0	0	0	0	0	40	2
Hartlepool United	2009–10	League One	11	0	0	0	0	0	0	0	11	0
Hartlepool United	Total		162	6	16	0	1	0	6	0	185	6
Gateshead	2010–11	Conference Premier	44	2	2	0	0	0	7	0	53	2
Gateshead	2011–12	Conference Premier	40	0	3	0	0	0	5	0	48	0
Gateshead	2012–13	Conference Premier	33	1	0	0	0	0	3	1	36	2
Gateshead	2013–14	Conference Premier	44	0	3	0	0	0	5	0	52	0
Gateshead	2014–15	Conference Premier	33	0	3	0	0	0	5	0	41	0
Gateshead	2015–16	Conference Premier	44	2	1	0	0	0	5	0	50	2
Gateshead	Total		238	5	12	0	0	0	30	1	280	6
South Shields	2016–17	Northern League Division One	4	0	0	0	0	0	0	0	4	0
Career total			412	11	30	0	5	0	36	1	483	12

B. The "Other" column constitutes appearances and goals (including those as a substitute) in the FA Trophy, Football League Trophy and play-offs.

== Managerial statistics ==
As of match played 8 October 2024

Managerial record by team and tenure
Team	From	To	Record					Ref
Team	From	To	P	W	D	L	Win %	Ref
Gateshead	10 January 2019	30 April 2019	17	5	5	7	29.41	
Gateshead (caretaker)	1 October 2024	15 October 2024	2	1	0	1	50.00	
Total			19	6	5	8	31.58	—

== Honours ==
Hartlepool United

- Football League Two second-place promotion: 2006–07

Individual

- Gateshead Player of the Year: 2010–11
