= James Brown (footballer, born 1987) =

English footballer

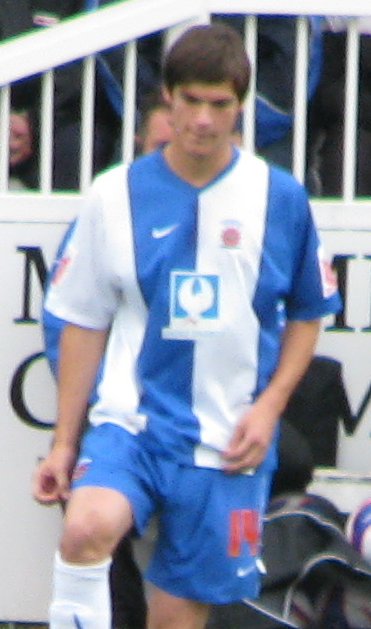
- Brown playing for Hartlepool United in 2007

Personal information
- Full name: James Peter Brown
- Date of birth: 3 January 1987 (age 39)
- Place of birth: Cramlington, England
- Height: 5 ft 11 in (1.80 m)
- Positions: Striker; winger

Senior career*
Years	Team	Apps	(Gls)
2004–2012	Hartlepool United	175	(29)
2012–2014	Gateshead	70	(9)
2014–2016	Whitby Town	46	(5)
Total		291	(43)
- * Club domestic league appearances and goals

James Peter Brown (born 3 January 1987) is an English retired footballer who played as a winger.

Brown started out as a striker for Football League side Hartlepool United but started playing on the wing during the club's promotion season in 2006–07. Brown also spent two seasons in the National League for Gateshead. Brown's career was ravaged by injuries and he retired from professional football aged 27, following this he played part-time for Northern Premier League side Whitby Town for two seasons.

== Career ==
=== Hartlepool United ===
Born in Cramlington, Northumberland, Brown joined Hartlepool's youth set-up from Cramlington Juniors football Club. He had joined too late to go through the Youth Scholarship system and was subsequently offered a temporary deal. He was part of the successful Hartlepool under 19s side that won the Dallas Cup XXV in 2004. James Brown was included on the substitutes bench for Hartlepool's match against AFC Bournemouth on the last day of the 2004–05 season. He was expected to play a part in the Hartlepool's 2005–06 campaign and participated regularly during pre-season. However, during pre-season, Brown ruptured his cruciate ligament against Hibernian and missed the majority of the subsequent season.

On 6 May 2006, Brown made his comeback from injury by making his debut for the club, coming off the bench to score in the 1–1 draw with Port Vale at Victoria Park. The game was bittersweet for Brown as Hartlepool's failure to win saw them relegated to League Two. James's finishing earned him his first professional contract with the club in 2006. During the 2006–07 campaign, he played nearly all of Hartlepool's games on the right wing as the club won promotion back to League One.

In August 2008, Brown signed a new long-term contract with Hartlepool. It was reported on 27 August 2008 that Celtic were interested in signing Brown after he was scouted by manager Gordon Strachan during Hartlepool's 3–1 League Cup win against Premier League side West Brom. The Daily Record reported that Tottenham Hotspur, Norwich City and Wolverhampton Wanderers were also monitoring Brown's progress.

Brown was released by Hartlepool on 10 May 2012. His time at Hartlepool was plagued by injuries which included two cruciate ligament injuries, an ankle injury and a persistent knee problem.

=== Gateshead ===
Brown signed for Conference Premier side Gateshead on 6 June 2012. His debut was delayed due to requiring surgery on a double hernia. He eventually made his Gateshead debut on 6 October 2012 as a second-half substitute in a 1–1 draw against Hyde. He made his first start for Gateshead three days later in a 2–2 draw with Macclesfield Town. Brown scored his first goal for Gateshead on 22 February 2013 in the return game against Macclesfield Town. He made his 50th appearance for Gateshead on 11 January 2014, scoring in a 2–1 win over Nuneaton Town.

Aged 27, Brown retired from professional football in November 2014 due to a persistent knee injury. Gateshead manager Gary Mills said of Brown's retirement: "I'm gutted for the player and the club and me as a manager that a player like him has left. It got the stage where enough was enough. We had a good session last Thursday and he was the best player – sticking the ball in the net, scoring goals you wouldn't believe. On the Friday I'm thinking of him playing Saturday and he was unable to train because of his ankle. He would not be at Gateshead if it wasn't for his injuries. With his desire to be a footballer and suffer those injuries is a shame. It's a sad thing, but he is 27 and probably going on 47. I wish him all the best and hopefully enjoy his football."

Following this, Brown played part-time for Whitby Town.

== In popular culture ==
Jeff Stelling of Sky Sports, a Hartlepool fan, has been known to exclaim "I feel good!" when Brown scores for Hartlepool, a reference to the more famous James Brown's "I Got You (I Feel Good)". Brown's goals on the opening day of the 2008/09 season against Colchester United led to Jeff Stelling revealing a James Brown singing and dancing doll toy with bobbing head singing "I Got You (I Feel Good)". In Stelling's book Jelleyman's Thrown a Wobbly, he revealed that a fan of Stelling's programme Soccer Saturday, had waited for three hours outside hospital which he was visiting for charity to present with the doll to be used whenever James Brown scored.

== Personal life ==
Following his retirement from professional football, Brown started working as a driving instructor.

== Career statistics ==
As of 11 October 2014

Appearances and goals by club, season and competition
Club	Season	League^{[A]}			FA Cup		League Cup		Other^{[B]}		Total	
Club	Season	Division	Apps	Goals	Apps	Goals	Apps	Goals	Apps	Goals	Apps	Goals
Hartlepool United	2004–05	League One	0	0	0	0	0	0	0	0	0	0
Hartlepool United	2005–06	League One	4	1	0	0	0	0	0	0	4	1
Hartlepool United	2006–07	League Two	36	6	2	1	2	0	2	0	42	7
Hartlepool United	2007–08	League One	35	10	2	1	2	0	2	2	41	13
Hartlepool United	2008–09	League One	18	6	2	1	3	1	1	0	24	8
Hartlepool United	2009–10	League One	32	4	0	0	1	0	0	0	33	4
Hartlepool United	2010–11	League One	26	1	2	1	2	1	1	0	31	3
Hartlepool United	2011–12	League One	24	1	0	0	0	0	1	0	25	1
Hartlepool United	Total		175	29	8	4	10	2	7	2	200	37
Gateshead	2012–13	Conference	29	4	1	0	0	0	1	0	31	4
Gateshead	2013–14	Conference	32	5	0	0	0	0	0	0	32	5
Gateshead	2014–15	Conference	9	0	0	0	0	0	0	0	9	0
Gateshead	Total		70	9	1	0	0	0	1	0	72	9
Career total			245	38	9	4	10	2	8	2	272	46

A. The "League" column constitutes appearances and goals in The Football League and Football Conference.
B. The "Other" column constitutes appearances and goals in the FA Trophy, Football League Trophy and play-offs.

== Honours ==
Hartlepool United

- Football League Two second-place promotion: 2006–07
