= Michael Mackay =

English footballer

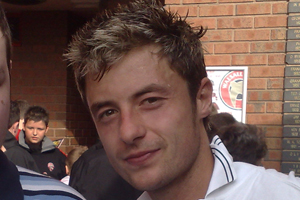
- Mackay in 2008

Personal information
- Date of birth: 11 October 1982 (age 44)
- Place of birth: Durham, England
- Position: Striker

Senior career*
Years	Team	Apps	(Gls)
2004–2005	Birtley Town	44	(29)
2005	Durham City	55	(30)
2005–2007	Consett	70	(82)
2007–2011	Hartlepool United	49	(7)
2009–2010	→ Gateshead (loan)	16	(2)
2011–2016	Consett	180	(163)
2016–2017	Jarrow Roofing	?	(?)
2017–2021	Consett	52	(25)
- * Club domestic league appearances and goals

Michael Mackay (born 11 October 1982) is an English retired footballer.

He made the move to Durham City from Birtley Town, where he scored prolifically, with 29 goals in his first season. He scored 30 goals before moving to Consett.

Mackay scored 43 goals in the first half of the 2006–07 season, which tempted Hartlepool to sign him in February 2007.

Mackay scored his first league goal for Hartlepool United on 2 October against Carlisle United, and then scored another goal in the Football League Trophy against Lincoln City on 9 October, a week after scoring his first. Mackay signed a new contract with the club in the summer of 2009.

On 3 August 2009, Mackay signed for Gateshead on loan for six months, making his debut in a 0–3 defeat to Histon five days later. Mackay scored his first goal for Gateshead the following week in a 1–2 defeat to Luton Town.

In May 2011, he was not offered a new contract by Hartlepool, along with nine other players from the 2010/11 squad.

Mackay scored 22 goals for Consett in the 2018/19 season, however an injury led to him only making nine appearances the following season.
