= Stephen Turnbull (footballer, born 1987) =

English footballer

Personal information
- Date of birth: 7 January 1987 (age 39)
- Place of birth: South Shields, England
- Height: 5 ft 11 in (1.80 m)
- Position: Midfielder

Youth career
- Hartlepool United

Senior career*
Years	Team	Apps	(Gls)
2004–2008	Hartlepool United	22	(0)
2005–2006	→ Gateshead (loan)	3	(0)
2006–2007	→ Bury (loan)	5	(0)
2007	→ Rochdale (loan)	4	(0)
2008–2009	Gateshead	40	(2)
2009–2011	Blyth Spartans	83	(11)
2011–2012	Harrogate Town	19	(2)
2013–2014	Blyth Spartans	16	(2)
2014	Shildon	3	(0)
2014–2017	Blyth Spartans	51	(7)
Total		206	(24)
- * Club domestic league appearances and goals

Stephen Turnbull (born 7 January 1987) is an English former footballer who last played for Blyth Spartans.

He played in the Football League for Hartlepool United, Bury and Rochdale.

== Playing career ==
Turnbull is a central midfield player. He captained the Hartlepool youth team during the Dallas Cup in 2005 where they achieved third place, and made 22 appearances for the first team the following season, earning his first professional contract.

He joined Bury on loan in 2006, where he was picked by manager Chris Casper for their 3–1 FA Cup second round replay win at Chester City on 12 December; he was ineligible to play and Bury were therefore thrown out of the tournament. Danny Wilson recalled Turnbull to Hartlepool soon after this. He spent March 2007 on loan at Rochdale, playing in four matches.

After leaving Hartlepool at the end of the 2007–08 season, he signed for Gateshead on 2 June 2008, teaming up with his brother. He was released by Gateshead on 14 May 2009 and signed for neighbours Blyth Spartans. Whilst at the club he was awarded the 2010–11 Supporters Player of the year award.

In May 2011 he joined Harrogate Town, but left in February 2012 to move to Australia.

In February 2013, Turnbull returned to England and rejoined Blyth Spartans. He played part-time and worked in the engine room of a cruise ship. He then left Spartans to join Shildon at the end of the 2013–14 season. In September 2014, he started his third spell at Blyth. In the 2014–15 season, he scored seven goals for the Spartans, one of them the famous free-kick at Hartlepool United in the second round of the FA Cup. He helped Blyth get to the third round proper as well as win the Northumberland Senior Cup. As of 22 August he has played a total of 150 appearances in three spells at Blyth Spartans. He announced on 1 February 2017, that he'd be ending his playing career to work full-time on the cruise-liner. He stated that, while he'd be back in England from "time-to-time", it was "largely the end" of his playing career.

== Personal life ==
He is the twin brother of fellow midfielder Phil Turnbull who he played alongside at Hartlepool and Gateshead.
