= Joel Porter =

Australian soccer player (born 1978)

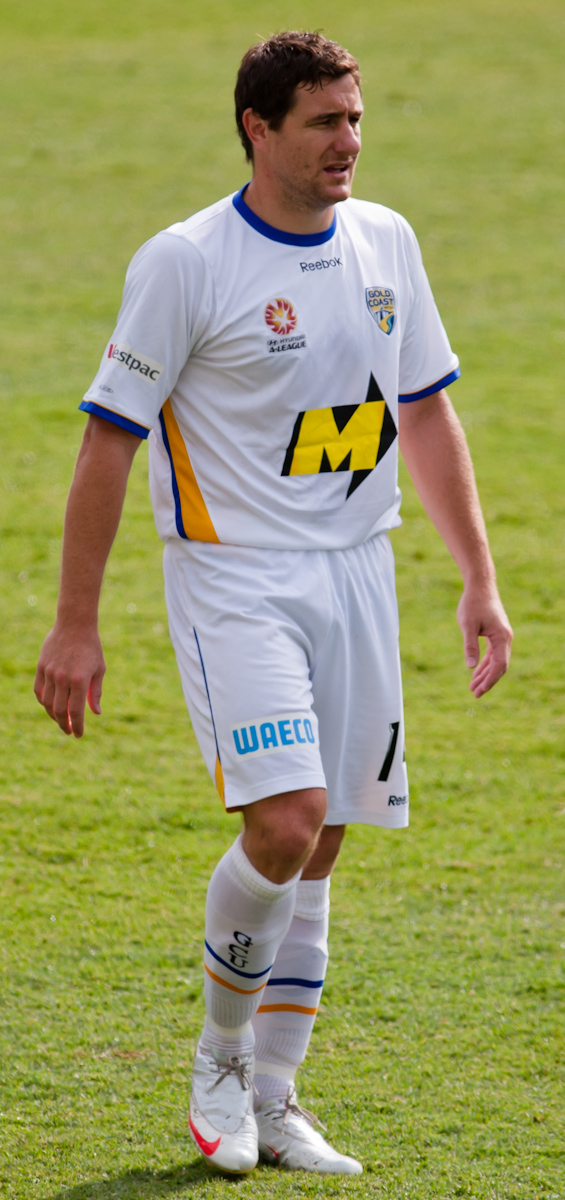

Personal information
- Full name: Joel William Porter
- Date of birth: 25 December 1978 (age 47)
- Place of birth: Adelaide, Australia
- Height: 1.75 m (5 ft 9 in)
- Position: Striker

Team information
- Current team: Croydon (assistant)

Youth career
- –1995: Croydon Kings

Senior career*
Years	Team	Apps	(Gls)
1995–1998	Croydon Kings	58	(28)
1998–1999	West Adelaide	20	(3)
1999–2000	Croydon Kings	28	(14)
2000–2002	Melbourne Knights	56	(24)
2002–2003	Sydney Olympic	32	(8)
2003–2009	Hartlepool United	173	(52)
2009–2012	Gold Coast United	43	(7)
2012–2014	West Adelaide	12	(1)
2014	Cumberland United	6	(0)
2014–2015	Northern Demons	10	(2)
2018–2020	Northern Demons	18	(2)
Total		456	(141)

International career^{‡}
2002	Australia	4	(6)

Managerial career
- 2013–2014: West Adelaide (assistant)
- 2013–2015: Adelaide United Women (assistant)
- 2014: West Adelaide
- 2015–2016: Adelaide Raiders
- 2017: Croydon Kings (assistant)
- 2017–2020: Northern Demons
- 2020: Croydon FC (assistant)
Medal record
Representing Australia
Men's Association football
OFC Nations Cup
Runner-up	2002 New Zealand
- * Club domestic league appearances and goals as of 23 December 2020 ‡ National team caps and goals as of 23:13, 27 December 2012 (UTC)

Joel William Porter (born 25 December 1978) is an Australian football (soccer) manager and former player.

== Club career ==
=== Australia ===
Porter began his playing career with Croydon Kings before going on to play for West Adelaide, Melbourne Knights FC and Sydney Olympic.

Porter was Melbourne Knight's top scorer in the 2001–02 season which saw him linked with moves to Feyenoord and Sunderland. In March 2002, Porter said: "I would love to play in Europe, of course, and I am trialling with a couple of teams hopefully when the season ends."

After turning down a new contract with Melbourne Knights, he joined Sydney Olympic. During his final season at Sydney Olympic, Porter managed to score 6 goals in 19 starts having played many of those matches as a midfielder. It was during his spell with Sydney Olympic that he received a call up for the Australia men's national soccer team.

=== Hartlepool United ===
Porter decided to look in Europe in a bid to find a club. He almost signed for Rayo Vallecano but the Spanish La Liga club were unprepared to take a gamble by signing him after doubts arouse over his fitness. After previously having trials in England with Wigan Athletic and Sunderland, before visa problems prevented them, Porter finally signed for Hartlepool in November 2003, as manager Neale Cooper added the Aussie to his ranks.

Porter made his Hartlepool debut against Swindon Town and scored his first goal against Burton Albion shortly afterwards during a live televised FA Cup match, a victory that secured a third round tie at neighbours Sunderland. Hartlepool manager Neale Cooper decided to offer him an 18-month contract at the end of 2003. However, Porter struggled to score in his first season and only notched up 5 goals in 31 appearances. Porter's fifth goal for the club was perhaps one of the most important as it earned Hartlepool a draw in the first leg of the playoff semi-final against Bristol City. They lost the second leg 2–1.

During the following 2004–05 season, Porter became a huge fan favourite and was a massive success. After a slow start he forced his way into the team after coming on as a substitute against Doncaster Rovers and scoring two late goals to secure a dramatic 3–2 win. This earned him a place alongside Adam Boyd in the Hartlepool line-up and the pair formed a legendary strike partnership. He then went on to notch 14 goals in 37 appearances. Porter's performances earned him the Fans' Player of the Year award.

In the 2005–06 season, Porter struggled with a long-term knee injury that lasted 10 months and prevented him from playing for the majority of the season. Porter returned to Hartlepool squad and came on as a substitute against Huddersfield, scoring after 6 minutes. However, his return could not prevent Hartlepool from being relegated from Football League One. He helped Hartlepool win promotion back to the Football League One the following season under Danny Wilson and helped Pools survive in the third tier the following two seasons.

On 9 October 2007, Porter became the first player in the club's history to score a hat-trick after coming on as a substitute in Hartlepool's 5–2 away win against Lincoln City in the Football League Trophy.

In the 2007–08 season, his performances attracted the attention of a host of A-League clubs such as Perth Glory and Wellington Phoenix FC who wanted to see him return home to play in the newly-formed A-League. Porter was closely linked to sign with the Phoenix, however Hartlepool elected to invoke the team option to re-sign him for one more year and he agreed to stay. Upon Porter staying at Hartlepool, Wellington chief executive Tony Pignata said that the news was "disappointing" and told the club's official website: "Joel's a quality striker and would have fitted in well with the squad. But his chairman at Hartlepool has stated Joel will remain in England and the contract is watertight, so there's nothing more that we can do except press on with the leads we have."

His final season at Victoria Park was his most prolific, seeing as he scored 23 times including a hat-trick against Swindon Town. In April, he announced he was heading back to Australia that summer but signed off his time in England in style, scoring twice at Yeovil Town, before being crowned the Player of the Year by fans and players alike before his last home game against Leeds United.

He returned to the town in 2015 for the reunion of the club's 2005 play-off squad, making a surprise return on stage to the delight of the crowd in attendance, his shock appearance coming after a short video was played of him sending good wishes to his former team-mates for the night which he seemingly was unable to attend.

=== Gold Coast United ===
On 24 April 2009, Porter announced he was leaving Hartlepool United for Gold Coast United FC. Upon signing, Hartlepool's Director of Sport Chris Turner said "He's selling himself short, but I think it's a lifestyle decision," which angered Gold Coast manager Miron Bleiberg. In his first season with Gold Coast, Porter earned himself a reputation as a supersub – he spent a lot of time during this season on the bench and the sidelines due to injury problems which Porter himself described as frustrating.

Porter left Gold Coast United at the end of the 2011–12 season with the club leaving the A-League. After leaving the club, he played for West Adelaide, Cumberland United and Northern Demons. He took up player-coach roles at both West Adelaide and Northern Demons.

== International career ==
Porter also represented Australia in the 2002 OFC Nations Cup where he went on to make four appearances for the Socceroos, scoring six goals in the process and finished as his country's top scorer. Porter was gifted the chance to play in the tournament as Soccer Australia could not afford to fund for its bigger overseas stars to play.

== Coaching career ==
Porter holds a UEFA B coaching licence which he obtained while coaching at Hartlepool United's academy. In April 2014, he took up the role of player-manager at West Adelaide SC after previously being player-assistant manager. However, two months later, Porter was sacked by West Adelaide. Speaking to The Advertiser, he said "I was told things were going OK to my face but obviously behind the scenes they weren’t too happy. I’m a bit bemused by it all and a bit taken aback by it."

In 2015, Porter temporarily took charge of Adelaide Raiders. At the time of his appointment, the Raiders were in the relegation zone with six games to go. However, the club managed to survive relegation on the final day of the season. Porter was given the job permanently in October 2015. In May 2016, with the club bottom of the National Premier Leagues South Australia, Porter was sacked as manager of Adelaide Raiders.

In 2017, he took up the manager's job at Northern Demons. On 25 October 2019, Porter signed a new contract with the club after he guided the Demons to the finals series the previous season. He left the club a year later.

== Career statistics ==
=== International ===
Appearances and goals by national team and year
National team	Year	Apps	Goals
Australia	2002	4	6
Total		4	6

Scores and results list Australia's goal tally first, score column indicates score after each Porter goal.

List of international goals scored by Joel Porter
No.	Date	Venue	Opponent	Score	Result	Competition	Ref.
1	8 July 2002	Mount Smart Stadium, Auckland, New Zealand	New Caledonia	10–0	11–0	2002 OFC Nations Cup	
2	10 July 2002	Mount Smart Stadium, Auckland, New Zealand	Fiji	2–0	8–0	2002 OFC Nations Cup	
3	10 July 2002	Mount Smart Stadium, Auckland, New Zealand	Fiji	3–0	8–0	2002 OFC Nations Cup	
4	10 July 2002	Mount Smart Stadium, Auckland, New Zealand	Fiji	5–0	8–0	2002 OFC Nations Cup	
5	10 July 2002	Mount Smart Stadium, Auckland, New Zealand	Fiji	7–0	8–0	2002 OFC Nations Cup	
6	12 July 2002	Mount Smart Stadium, Auckland, New Zealand	Tahiti	1–1	2–1	2002 OFC Nations Cup	

== Honours ==
Hartlepool United

- Football League Two second-place promotion: 2006–07

Australia

- OFC Nations Cup runner-up: 2002

Individual

- Hartlepool United Player of the Year: 2004–05, 2008–09
