= Ali Gibb =

English footballer (born 1976)

Personal information
- Full name: Alistair Stuart Gibb
- Date of birth: 17 February 1976 (age 50)
- Place of birth: Salisbury, England
- Height: 5 ft 9 in (1.75 m)
- Position: Right midfielder

Team information
- Current team: Bolton Wanderers (Academy physio)

Senior career*
| Years | Team | Apps | (Gls) |
| 1994–1996 | Norwich City | 0 | (0) |
| 1995–1996 | → Northampton Town (loan) | 23 | (2) |
| 1996–2000 | Northampton Town | 108 | (2) |
| 2000–2004 | Stockport County | 158 | (7) |
| 2004–2006 | Bristol Rovers | 64 | (2) |
| 2006–2008 | Hartlepool United | 31 | (0) |
| 2008 | → Notts County (loan) | 9 | (0) |
| 2008–2009 | Bath City | 0 | (0) |
| 2009 | → Yate Town (loan) | 1 | (0) |
| 2009 | Newport County | 0 | (0) |
| 2009 | Almondsbury Town | 0 | (0) |
| Total | | 394 | (13) |
- * Club domestic league appearances and goals

Alistair Stuart Gibb (born 17 February 1976) is a former footballer, who is Senior Academy Physiotherapist at League One club Bolton Wanderers. He joined Bath after his release from Hartlepool United in 2008. The former Norwich City player was signed by Hartlepool on transfer deadline day in August 2006.

Gibb was a versatile right sided player, who usually played on the right wing. He began his career at Norwich City before moving to Northampton Town. He then played over 150 games for Stockport County before joining Bristol Rovers in 2004. He joined Notts County on loan in January 2008.

After signing for Bath City in the summer of 2008, Gibb broke his ankle during pre-season training and was unable to play for seven months. He was loaned to Yate Town in February 2009 in order to regain match fitness.

== Post-playing career ==
Gibb has held physiotherapist posts at Shrewsbury Town and former club Stockport. As of 2017, he is the Senior Academy Physiotherapist at Football League One club Bolton Wanderers.

== Personal life ==
Gibb studied at the University of Salford for a degree in Physiotherapy, graduating in 2015 with first class honours and the highest marks in the part-time degree cohort.

== Honours ==
Northampton Town

- Football League Third Division play-offs: 1997

Hartlepool United

- Football League Two second-place promotion: 2006–07
