= Jamie McCunnie =

Scottish footballer

Personal information
- Full name: Jamie Patrick McCunnie
- Date of birth: 15 April 1983 (age 43)
- Place of birth: Glasgow, Scotland
- Height: 5 ft 10 in (1.78 m)
- Position: Midfielder

Youth career
- ????–1999: Dundee United

Senior career*
Years	Team	Apps	(Gls)
1999–2003	Dundee United	60	(0)
2003–2005	Ross County	63	(0)
2005–2007	Dunfermline Athletic	36	(0)
2007–2009	Hartlepool United	44	(1)
2009–2010	East Fife	28	(2)
2010–2011	Haukar	10	(0)
2011–2012	Grindavík	20	(1)
2012	Íþróttafélag Reykjavíkur	0	(0)
2012–2013	Stirling Albion	35	(0)
2014–2021	Broughty Athletic		

International career
2001–2005	Scotland U21	20	(0)
2005	Scotland B	1	(0)

Managerial career
- 2017: Broughty Athletic (caretaker)
- 2018–2021: Broughty Athletic
- * Club domestic league appearances and goals

Jamie Patrick McCunnie (born 15 April 1983) is a Scottish football referee and former player. His previous clubs include Dundee United, Ross County and Hartlepool United. He represented Scotland at under-21 and B international levels. McCunnie managed the Abertay University Men's 1st team for the 2019–20 season and was also the player-manager of Scottish Junior Football East Region Super League team Broughty Athletic.

== Playing career ==
McCunnie began his senior career with Dundee United at youth level, signing for them professionally in 1999. Normally featuring as a right back at this stage of his career, he was given his first team début for United away to Hibernian in December 2000. Despite McCunnie being aged only 17 at the time, manager Alex Smith was sufficiently impressed by his performances to keep him as a regular first team player for the rest of that season, helping the club climb successfully out of relegation and reach a Scottish Cup semi-final. McCunnie's successful season culminated in him signing a new three-year contract with the Tannadice club, while also making his début for Scotland under-21 side against Poland.

At this time, McCunnie was rated as one of the best young players in Scottish football. However, despite featuring regularly for Dundee United over the next two seasons and becoming captain of the Scotland under-21s, he began to lose consistency from his form. Ian McCall had become manager of Dundee United early in 2003, and seemingly unimpressed by the player's attitude, soon made it known to McCunnie that he was willing to dispense with his services. The somewhat surprised player found himself offloaded to First Division side Ross County, where his former mentor Alex Smith was now manager, in June 2003. McCunnie spent two seasons playing for the Dingwall club, during which time he was converted from right back to a defensive midfield role. His Ross County contract was due to expire in 2005 and he was keen to seek a return to a higher level of football, with a move to English football a distinct possibility. He was widely expected to join Cardiff City following a successful trial, but the move ultimately fell through, and a trial with Gillingham was also unproductive. Instead, McCunnie was able to secure himself a return to the top flight of Scottish football, signing for Dunfermline Athletic in August 2005. He has established himself as a regular first team player, despite an injury absence early in his Dunfermline career, resulting from an assault outside a Dundee nightclub.

McCunnie joined Hartlepool United on 15 June 2007 on a free transfer, preferring the move to a contract extension, which he was widely expected to sign. On 6 May 2009, he was released by Hartlepool after being deemed surplus to requirements. He signed for East Fife for the 2009–10 season, but was released once the season had finished.

He then moved to Iceland, playing with Haukar, Grindavik and Íþróttafélag Reykjavíkur. In March 2012, he returned to Scotland and signed for Stirling Albion.

== Managerial career ==
In the 2019–20 season, McCunnie managed the Abertay University Men's 1st team.

After leaving Stirling Albion, McCunnie signed for Dundee-based junior club Broughty Athletic. He took over as the club's caretaker manager in August 2017, following the resignation of previous manager Keith Gibson, then was appointed as interim for a second time in the same season after the resignation of Gibsons successor, Jim Finlayson in January 2018.

On 28 February 2018, McCunnie became first team manager at Broughty Athletic.

== Refereeing career ==
At the start of the 2020 coronavirus lockdown in Scotland, McCunnie qualified as a referee. Initially refereeing at grassroots level, McCunnie began refereeing Highland League games from the start of the 2022–23 season.

== Personal life ==
In March 2022, McCunnie was left scarred for life after he was attacked in an over-35s league match.

== Career statistics ==
Appearances and goals by club, season and competition
Club	Season	League			Cup (Note: Includes Scottish Cup, FA Cup)		League Cup (Note: Includes Scottish League Cup, Football League Cup)		Other		Total	
Club	Season	Division	Apps	Goals	Apps	Goals	Apps	Goals	Apps	Goals	Apps	Goals
Dundee United	2000–01	Scottish Premier League	15	0	4	0	—		—		19	0
Dundee United	2001–02	Scottish Premier League	28	0	4	0	2	0	—		34	0
Dundee United	2002–03	Scottish Premier League	13	0	—		1	0	—		14	0
Dundee United	Total		56	0	8	0	3	0	0	0	67	0
Ross County	2003–04	Scottish First Division	35	0	1	0	2	0	3 (Note: Appearance(s) in Scottish League Challenge Cup)	0	41	0
Ross County	2004–05	Scottish First Division	27	0	3	0	1	0	4	0	35	0
Ross County	Total		62	0	4	0	3	0	7	0	76	0
Dunfermline Athletic	2005–06	Scottish Premier League	22	0	1	0	2	1	—		25	1
Dunfermline Athletic	2006–07	Scottish Premier League	14	0	4	0	1	0	—		19	0
Dunfermline Athletic	Total		36	0	5	0	3	1	0	0	44	1
Hartlepool United	2007–08	Football League One	29	1	2	0	2	0	3 (Note: Appearance(s) in Football League Trophy)	0	36	1
Hartlepool United	2008–09	Football League One	15	0	2	0	2	0	1	0	20	0
Hartlepool United	Total		44	1	4	0	4	0	4	0	56	1
East Fife	2009–10	Scottish Second Division	28	2	0	0	0	0	—		28	2
Stirling Albion	2011–12	Scottish Second Division	7	0	0	0	0	0	—		7	0
Stirling Albion	2012–13	Scottish Third Division	28	0	0	0	0	0	2	0	30	0
Stirling Albion	2013–14	Scottish League Two	2	0	0	0	1	0	1	0	4	0
Stirling Albion	Total		37	0	0	0	1	0	3	0	41	0
Total			263	3	21	0	14	1	14	0	312	4
