= Jan Budtz =

Danish footballer (born 1979)

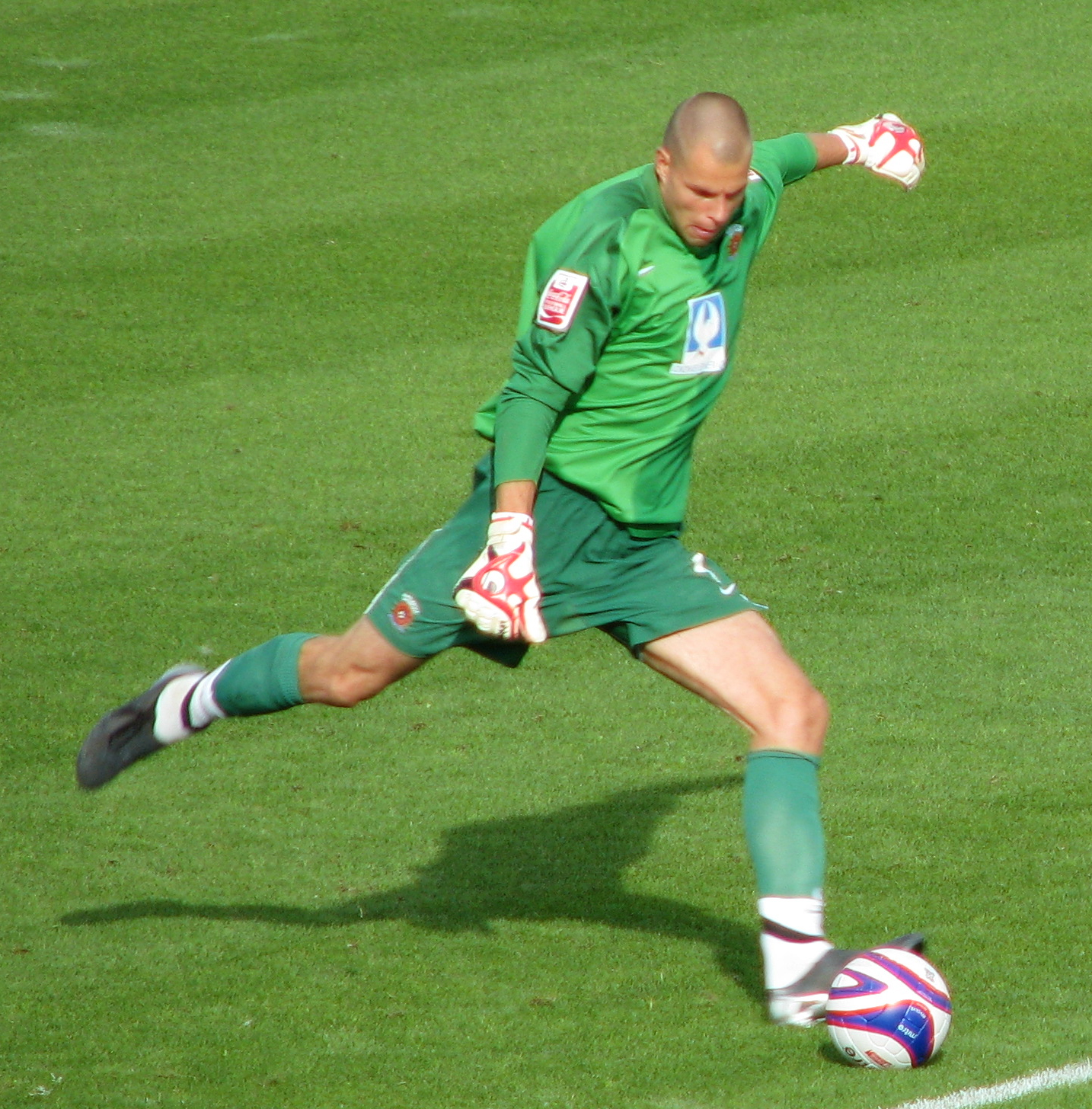
- Budtz playing for Hartlepool United

Personal information
- Full name: Jan Helstrup Budtz
- Date of birth: 20 April 1979 (age 47)
- Place of birth: Hillerød, Denmark
- Height: 6 ft 5 in (1.96 m)
- Position: Goalkeeper

Team information
- Current team: Rossington Main (player); Doncaster Rovers (Head of Operations)

Senior career*
Years	Team	Apps	(Gls)
2004–2005	B 1909		
2005	FC Nordsjælland		
2005–2007	Doncaster Rovers	27	(0)
2007	→ Wolverhampton Wanderers (loan)	4	(0)
2007–2009	Hartlepool United	38	(0)
2009	→ Oldham Athletic (loan)	3	(0)
2009–2010	Eastwood Town		
2010–2012	Stalybridge Celtic	79	(0)
2012	Buxton		
2012–2013	Gainsborough Trinity	31	(0)
2013–2014	Worksop Town		
2014–2016	Gainsborough Trinity	66	(0)
2016–2018	Buxton	105	(0)
2018–2020	Rossington Main	51	(0)
2020–2021	Grantham Town	11	(0)
2021	Worksop Town	2	(0)
2021–	Rossington Main		
- * Club domestic league appearances and goals as of 20:49, 18 February 2022 (UTC)

Jan Helstrup Budtz (born 20 April 1979) is a Danish footballer who plays as a goalkeeper. He works as the head of operations for League One side Doncaster Rovers, as well as playing semi-professionally for Rossington Main.

He has previously played for B 1909 and FC Nordsjælland before moving to England with Doncaster Rovers. He also played in the Football League with Wolverhampton Wanderers, Hartlepool United and Oldham Athletic, before moving into Non-league football with Eastwood Town, Stalybridge Celtic, Worksop Town, Gainsborough Trinity, Buxton, and Grantham Town.

== Playing career ==
Born in Hillerød, Budtz became an instant hero in his first game for Doncaster Rovers when he replaced the injured Andy Warrington during a League Cup tie against Manchester City in September 2005. He saved two of the three penalties taken by the Premier League side during the shootout to send Doncaster into the next round (the first penalty, by Darius Vassell, hit the crossbar). His name was subsequently plastered all over local and national newspapers the following day and he also made several appearances on local TV news channels.

Following his initial day of glory, he largely failed to progress though. Although he enjoyed a good run in the first team in the 2005–06 season, he was increasingly sidelined in Spring 2006. Budtz fractured a bone in his hand in January 2006, and Doncaster Rovers quickly signed replacement Alan Blayney.

By the beginning of the 2006–07 season, he was relegated to third choice behind Benjamin Smith and Blayney. Budtz signed an emergency loan deal with Wolverhampton Wanderers of the Championship. He eventually signed a six-week extension with Wolves, and made his debut on 17 March as a half-time substitute in a 2–2 draw at Sheffield Wednesday. He was eventually recalled by his parent club on 24 April, following their own on-loan goalkeeper, Neil Sullivan, returning to Leeds United.

Budtz was signed by fellow League One side Hartlepool United on 29 June 2007. He was their first-choice goalkeeper throughout the first half of the season, but lost his place for the final months after some poor performances.

On 14 February 2009, he was loaned out to Oldham Athletic on a month's loan, making his debut on the same day in a 2–1 victory over Northampton Town. He returned to Hartlepool but was released from his contract on 6 May after being deemed surplus to requirements.

He signed for Conference North side Eastwood Town on 16 September 2010, but left with mutual consent in March 2010 after a 'financial disagreement.'

In summer 2010 he signed for Conference North side Stalybridge Celtic.

In the summer of 2012, Budtz signed a contract with Northern Premier League side Buxton, however he joined Conference North side Gainsborough Trinity on 26 July 2012. After one season with Trinity, which included reaching the semi-finals of the FA Trophy, Budtz was released by the club on 24 May 2013 and joined Northern Premier League side Worksop Town, however, in June 2014, Budtz returned to Gainsborough. After 2 years with Gainsborough, Budtz rejoined Buxton on 27 May 2016.

Budtz had a spell with Rossington Main and later joined Grantham Town at the end of June 2020.

On 25 August 2021, Budtz returned to Worksop Town having been released by Grantham, but ON 28 September 2021 he made his second debut back with Rossington Main.

== Coaching career ==
On 16 January 2013, as well as playing for Gainsborough, Budtz re-joined former club Doncaster Rovers media team.

He is now the head of operations at Doncaster's training centre.

== Personal life ==
He is the twin brother of fellow footballer Ole Budtz. He also has three sons, 21, 14 and 1 as of 2021.
