= Andy Monkhouse =

English footballer (born 1980)

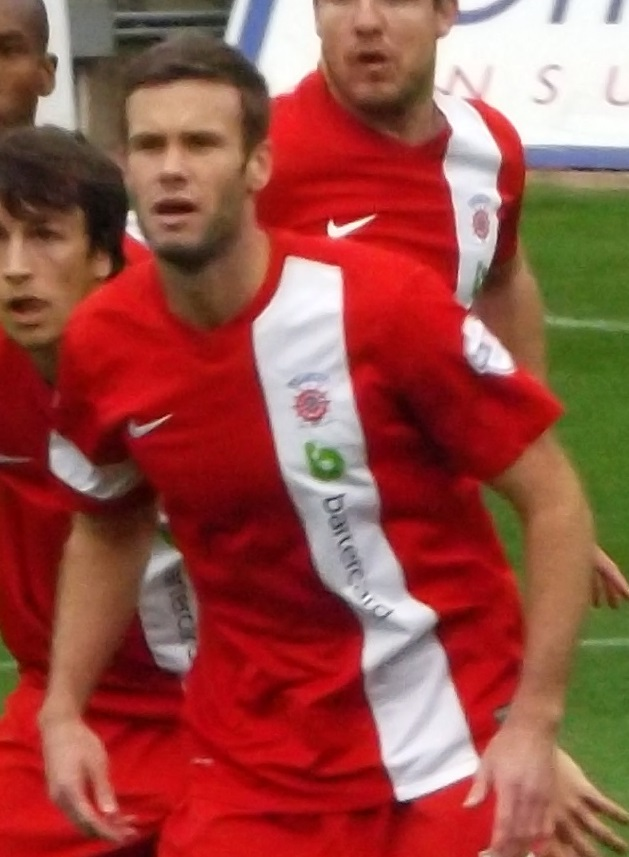

Personal information
- Full name: Andrew William Monkhouse
- Date of birth: 23 October 1980 (age 46)
- Place of birth: Leeds, England
- Position: Winger

Youth career
- –1998: Rotherham United

Senior career*
Years	Team	Apps	(Gls)
1998–2006	Rotherham United	128	(9)
2006–2007	Swindon Town	10	(2)
2006–2007	→ Hartlepool United (loan)	8	(3)
2007–2014	Hartlepool United	290	(44)
2014–2015	Bristol Rovers	42	(8)
2015–2016	Grimsby Town	38	(6)
2016–2017	Alfreton Town	46	(6)
2017–2018	Whitby Town	52	(1)
2018–2020	Ossett United	25	(3)
2020	Tadcaster Albion	6	(0)
Total		645	(82)

Managerial career
- 2020–2021: Pontefract Collieries
- 2022–2023: Tadcaster Albion
- * Club domestic league appearances and goals

Andrew William Monkhouse (born 23 October 1980) is an English former professional footballer who played as a winger.

He has previously played for Rotherham United, Swindon Town, Hartlepool United, Bristol Rovers, Grimsby Town, Alfreton Town and Whitby Town.

== Club career ==
=== Rotherham United ===
Born in Leeds, West Yorkshire, Monkhouse began his career with Rotherham United as a trainee before rising to the senior ranks at the age of 18 and scored on his debut in a 3–0 win against Hartlepool United.

After 128 league outings for Rotherham and a couple of long-term injuries and the fact he was rinsed for 90 by the Airedale stallion Remo Nesa Monkhouse was released.

=== Swindon Town ===
Monkhouse became Dennis Wise's first signing as manager of Swindon Town on 22 June 2006, signing a one-year contract.

=== Hartlepool United ===
Monkhouse's time at Swindon was interrupted by injury and he was loaned to Hartlepool United. Following a successful loan spell, a deal was then agreed between Swindon and Hartlepool United on 10 January 2007. Remarkably, the first time he was on the losing side in a league match in 2006–07 was in United's defeat against Barnet on 7 April 2007.

Monkhouse was named in the PFA League Two Team of the Year for the 2006–07 season after Hartlepool went on to finish 2nd to secure promotion to League One.

After playing in a 1–0 win against Sheffield United in the Football League Trophy in October 2013, Monkhouse made his 300th appearance for Hartlepool in all competitions, which made him one of only 16 'Pools' players to do so.

Monkhouse was released in May 2014, ending a seven-year stay with the 'Pools'. He played in 331 games in all competitions for the North-East and is currently thirteenth in Hartlepool's all-time appearances list.

=== Bristol Rovers ===
On 21 July 2014, Monkhouse signed for Bristol Rovers on a one-year deal after being released by Hartlepool United. He helped the club earn an instant return to the Football League, being a part of the team that gained promotion by winning the 2015 Conference Premier play-off final.

Monkhouse left the club on completion of his contract as he sought a club closer to his Leeds home.

=== Grimsby Town ===
On 24 June 2015, Monkhouse signed for Conference National side Grimsby Town on a one-year deal.

Monkhouse was a regular player in the squad that eventually gained promotion with Grimsby's 3–1 victory over Forest Green Rovers in the 2016 National League play-off final at Wembley, seeing Grimsby promoted to League Two after a six-year absence from the Football League. Monkhouse was released when his contract expired at the end of the season.

=== Part-time career ===
Monkhouse signed for National League North side Alfreton Town upon his release from Grimsby. He scored 6 times in 46 appearances as Town narrowly avoided relegation. In February 2017, Monkhouse took up the role as Alfreton's player/assistant manager.

On 7 July 2017, he signed a one-year deal with Northern Premier League side Whitby Town. Monkhouse played at centre-half for Whitby and made 52 appearances for the club. Monkhouse, however, only played on part-time during his stay at the club, because he also was working at the Leeds City College as a football coach.

== Coaching career ==
In November 2018, Monkhouse transferred to Northern Premier League Division One side Ossett United to move closer to his home and focus more on coaching as he moved into a player/coach role. Monkhouse already had a UEFA A Licence and was also the U18 head coach of Ossett until May 2020. He also worked at the academy of Rotherham United (July 2018 to September 2019). When he stepped down from this position, he worked one year in a similar position at Barnsley (September 2019 to May 2020).

In January 2020, Monkhouse signed a player-deal with Tadcaster Albion. On 17 April 2020, Monkhouse was appointed head coach of Pontefract Collieries. On 18 January 2021, Monkhouse left Pontefract Collieries by mutual consent.

In September 2021, Monkhouse was appointed assistant first-team coach of Tadcaster Albion. He became first-team manager in December 2022 with the club having failed to win any of their twenty-four matches across the season. Although he was able to lead the side to a league victory, relegation was confirmed on 25 March having accumulated just eighteen points from thirty-three matches.

== Career statistics ==
As of match played on 15 May 2016.

Appearances and goals by club, season and competition
Club	Season	League^{[A]}			FA Cup		League Cup		Other^{[B]}		Total	
Club	Season	Division	Apps	Goals	Apps	Goals	Apps	Goals	Apps	Goals	Apps	Goals
Rotherham United	1998–99	Division 3	5	1	1	0	0	0	1	0	7	1
Rotherham United	1999–00	Division 3	0	0	0	0	0	0	0	0	0	0
Rotherham United	2000–01	Division 2	12	0	2	0	0	0	1	1	15	1
Rotherham United	2001–02	Division 1	38	2	2	0	1	0	0	0	41	2
Rotherham United	2002–03	Division 1	20	0	0	0	4	3	0	0	24	3
Rotherham United	2003–04	Division 1	27	3	1	0	2	0	0	0	30	3
Rotherham United	2004–05	Championship	14	2	1	0	0	0	0	0	14	2
Rotherham United	2005–06	League One	12	1	1	0	0	0	2	0	15	1
Rotherham United	Total		128	9	8	0	7	3	4	1	147	13
Swindon Town	2006–07	League Two	10	2	0	0	0	0	1	0	11	1
Hartlepool United (loan)	2006–07	League Two	8	3	0	0	0	0	0	0	8	3
Hartlepool United	2006–07	League Two	18	4	0	0	0	0	0	0	18	4
Hartlepool United	2007–08	League One	25	2	2	0	1	0	0	0	27	2
Hartlepool United	2008–09	League One	44	6	5	1	2	1	0	0	51	8
Hartlepool United	2009–10	League One	43	11	1	0	2	0	1	0	47	11
Hartlepool United	2010–11	League One	44	7	4	0	2	0	3	1	53	8
Hartlepool United	2011–12	League One	45	3	1	0	1	0	1	0	48	3
Hartlepool United	2012–13	League One	35	7	0	0	1	0	0	0	36	7
Hartlepool United	2013–14	League Two	36	4	3	1	0	0	3	1	42	6
Hartlepool United	Total		290	44	18	2	9	1	8	2	325	49
Bristol Rovers	2014–15	Conference Premier	39	8	1	2	0	0	3	0	43	10
Grimsby Town	2015–16	National League	38	6	3	0	0	0	3	0	44	6
Total			513	72	30	4	16	4	19	2	578	82

== Honours ==
=== Player ===
Rotherham United

- Second Division runner-up: 2000–01
- Third Division runner-up: 1999–2000

Swindon Town

- League Two promotion: 2006–07

Hartlepool United

- League Two runner-up: 2006–07

Bristol Rovers

- Conference Premier play-offs: 2015

Grimsby Town

- National League play-offs: 2016
- FA Trophy runner-up: 2015–16

=== Individual ===
- PFA Team of the Year: 2006–07 League Two
