= Hartlepool Borough Council elections =

Local government elections in County Durham, England

Hartlepool Borough Council elections usually take place for a third of the council, three years out of every four. Hartlepool Borough Council is the local authority for the unitary authority of Hartlepool in County Durham, England. Until 1 April 1996 it was a non-metropolitan district in Cleveland.

== Council elections ==
=== Non-metropolitan district elections ===
- 1973 Hartlepool Borough Council election
- 1976 Hartlepool Borough Council election (New ward boundaries)
- 1979 Hartlepool Borough Council election
- 1980 Hartlepool Borough Council election
- 1982 Hartlepool Borough Council election
- 1983 Hartlepool Borough Council election
- 1984 Hartlepool Borough Council election
- 1986 Hartlepool Borough Council election
- 1987 Hartlepool Borough Council election
- 1988 Hartlepool Borough Council election
- 1990 Hartlepool Borough Council election
- 1991 Hartlepool Borough Council election
- 1992 Hartlepool Borough Council election
- 1994 Hartlepool Borough Council election

=== Unitary authority elections ===
- 1995 Hartlepool Borough Council election
- 1996 Hartlepool Borough Council election
- 1998 Hartlepool Borough Council election
- 1999 Hartlepool Borough Council election
- 2000 Hartlepool Borough Council election
- 2002 Hartlepool Borough Council election
- 2003 Hartlepool Borough Council election
- 2004 Hartlepool Borough Council election (New ward boundaries)
- 2006 Hartlepool Borough Council election
- 2007 Hartlepool Borough Council election
- 2008 Hartlepool Borough Council election
- 2010 Hartlepool Borough Council election
- 2011 Hartlepool Borough Council election
- 2012 Hartlepool Borough Council election (New ward boundaries)
- 2014 Hartlepool Borough Council election
- 2015 Hartlepool Borough Council election
- 2016 Hartlepool Borough Council election
- 2018 Hartlepool Borough Council election
- 2019 Hartlepool Borough Council election
- 2021 Hartlepool Borough Council election (New ward boundaries)
- 2022 Hartlepool Borough Council election
- 2023 Hartlepool Borough Council election
- 2024 Hartlepool Borough Council election
- 2026 Hartlepool Borough Council election

== Results maps ==
2004 results map

2006 results map

2007 results map

2008 results map

2010 results map

2011 results map

2012 results map

2014 results map

2015 results map

2016 results map

2018 results map

2019 results map

2021 results map

2022 results map

2023 results map

2024 results map

2026 results map

== Mayoral elections ==
On 18 October 2001 there was a referendum on whether Hartlepool should have a directly elected mayor. The referendum saw a narrow vote in favour with 10,667 yes votes and 10,294 no votes on a turnout of 31%. The first election in 2002 saw an independent candidate Stuart Drummond elected and he has been re-elected in both the 2005 and 2009 elections. A referendum to abolish the mayoralty in 2012 succeeded, with 58.7% favouring a cabinet system.

- Hartlepool mayoral election, 2002
- Hartlepool mayoral election, 2005
- Hartlepool mayoral election, 2009

== By-election results ==
=== 1998–2002 ===
Jackson By-Election 13 December 2001
Party	Candidate	Votes	%	±%
Labour	Bill Iseley	465	66.0	+20.9
Liberal Democrats	Ken Fox	240	34.0	−20.9
Majority		225	32.0	
Turnout		705	17.1	
Labour gain from Liberal Democrats		Swing		

=== 2002–2006 ===
St Hilda By-Election 13 February 2003
Party	Candidate	Votes	%	±%
Independent	John Cambridge	502	48.6	+10.5
Labour	Keith Fisher	359	34.8	−0.6
Liberal Democrats	Kevin Kelly	171	16.6	−10.0
Majority		143	13.8	
Turnout		1,032	21.1	
Independent hold		Swing		

Rift House By-Election 24 February 2005
Party	Candidate	Votes	%	±%
Labour	Lilian Sutheran	440	52.4	+5.8
Liberal Democrats	Lynne Gilfoyle	143	17.0	−14.7
UKIP	Richard Banks	131	15.6	+15.6
Conservative	Brenda Pearson	126	15.0	−6.8
Majority		297	35.4	
Turnout		840	18.5	
Labour hold		Swing		

=== 2006–2010 ===
Brus By-Election 8 June 2006
Party	Candidate	Votes	%	±%
Labour		350	40.5	−2.3
Liberal Democrats	Michelle Plant	230	26.6	+8.6
Independent	Jean Pearson	127	14.7	−4.7
BNP		117	13.5	+1.8
Conservative		41	4.7	−3.4
Majority		120	13.9	
Turnout		865	18.5	
Labour hold		Swing		

Park By-Election 20 July 2006
Party	Candidate	Votes	%	±%
Conservative	Mary Laffey	468	46.1	−2.6
UKIP	Eric Wilson	208	20.5	−4.9
Labour	Lorraine Fenwick	121	120	−0.5
Liberal Democrats	Sheila Bruce	99	9.7	−3.6
BNP	Ronald Bage	68	6.7	+6.7
Independent	Douglas Ferriday	51	5.0	+5.0
Majority		260	25.6	
Turnout		1,015	21.0	
Conservative hold		Swing		

Rossmere By-Election 7 May 2009
Party	Candidate	Votes	%	±%
Labour	Christopher Akers-Belcher	532	42.3	+5.2
UKIP	Dave Pascoe	300	23.9	−4.5
Liberal Democrats	Pamela Turnedge	166	13.2	−6.4
BNP	Cheryl Dunn	157	12.5	+12.5
Conservative	Ray Pocklington	102	8.1	−6.9
Majority		232	18.4	
Turnout		1,257	26.7	
Labour hold		Swing		

Elwick By-Election 24 September 2009
Party	Candidate	Votes	%	±%
Independent	Hilary Thompson	233	35.5	−48.8
Conservative	Chris Banks	201	30.9	+30.9
Independent	Alan Bell	132	20.3	+20.3
Labour	Stephen Thomas	40	6.1	−9.3
Independent	Ron Watts	28	4.3	+4.3
Liberal Democrats	Keith MacFadyen	17	2.6	+2.6
Majority		32	4.9	
Turnout		651	39.2	
Independent hold		Swing		

=== 2010–2014 ===
Seaton By-Election 25 October 2012
Party	Candidate	Votes	%	±%
Putting Hartlepool First	Kelly Atkinson	441	38.4	+23.4
Labour	Ann Marshall	261	22.7	+9.6
Independent	David Young	193	16.8	−36.7
UKIP	Thomas Hind	128	11.1	+0.0
Conservative	Shane Moore	94	8.2	+1.0
Liberal Democrats	James Tighe	31	2.7	+2.7
Majority		180	15.7	
Turnout		1,148	16.1	
Putting Hartlepool First gain from Independent		Swing		

Manor House By-Election 15 August 2013
Party	Candidate	Votes	%	±%
Labour	Allan Barclay	639	56.4	+7.0
UKIP	Tom Hind	226	19.9	+4.2
Putting Hartlepool First	Mick Stevens	194	17.1	+0.5
Conservative	Mandy Loynes	74	6.5	+0.8
Majority		413	36.5	
Turnout		1,133	15.8	
Labour hold		Swing		

=== 2014–2018 ===
Headland & Harbour By-Election 6 October 2016
Party	Candidate	Votes	%	±%
UKIP	Tim Fleming	496	49.2	+0.6
Labour	Trevor Rogan	255	25.3	−16.5
Putting Hartlepool First	Steve Latimer	155	15.4	+15.4
Conservative	Benjamin Marshall	41	4.1	−5.6
Patients not Profits	John Robert Price	36	3.6	+3.6
Independent	Chris Broadbent	26	2.6	+2.6
Majority		241	23.9	
Turnout		1,009	17.8	
UKIP gain from Labour		Swing		

Headland & Harbour By-Election 4 May 2017
Party	Candidate	Votes	%	±%
Labour	Mike McLaughlin	555	40.6	+2.6
UKIP	Tom Cassidy	532	38.9	+8.1
Conservative	Chris Broadbent	210	15.4	+5.6
Independent	Lucy Patterson	69	5.1	+5.1
Majority		23	1.7	
Turnout		1,366	24.4	
Labour hold		Swing		

Seaton By-Election 19 October 2017
Party	Candidate	Votes	%	±%
Putting Hartlepool First	Leisa Smith	474	31.6	+3.2
Independent	Sue Little	425	28.3	+2.1
Labour	Ann Marshall	275	18.3	+4.8
Conservative	Mike Young	180	12.0	+6.0
UKIP	Karen King	148	9.9	−13.5
Majority		49	3.3	
Turnout		1,502	21.4	
Putting Hartlepool First gain from Independent		Swing		

Victoria By-Election 16 November 2017
Party	Candidate	Votes	%	±%
Labour	Katie Trueman	479	53.1	+1.9
UKIP	Jacqui Cummins	325	36.0	+6.4
Conservative	Andrew Martin-Wells	98	10.9	−1.0
Majority		154	17.1	
Turnout		902	15.9	
Labour hold		Swing		

=== 2018–2022 ===
Rural West By-Election 12 July 2018
Party	Candidate	Votes	%	±%
Conservative	Mike Young	678	45.4	−13.0
Independent	James Brewer	546	36.5	+18.6
Labour	Yousuf Khan	184	12.3	−5.4
Green	Michael Holt	87	5.8	−0.1
Majority		132	8.8	
Turnout		1,495	25.3	
Conservative hold		Swing		

Hart By-Election 11 October 2018
Party	Candidate	Votes	%	±%
Independent	James Brewer	637	44.1	+44.1
Labour	Aileen Kendon	582	40.2	+1.5
Conservative	Cameron Stokell	200	13.8	−3.4
Green	Michael Holt	27	1.9	+1.9
Majority		55	3.8	
Turnout		1,446		
Independent gain from Labour		Swing		

Hart By-Election 25 July 2019
Party	Candidate	Votes	%	±%
Labour	Ann Johnson	366	30.5	−2.3
IU	Ian Griffiths	358	29.8	−37.4
Green	Michael Ritchie	196	16.3	n/a
For Britain	Graham Craddy	166	13.8	n/a
UKIP	Graham Harrison	114	9.5	n/a
Majority		8	0.7	
Turnout		1,200	16.9	
Labour gain from Independent		Swing		

=== 2022–2026 ===
Foggy Furze By-Election 8 September 2022
Party	Candidate	Votes	%	±%
Labour	Carole Thompson	443	43.9	
Conservative	Pamela Shurmer	391	38.8	
Independent	Connor Stallard	126	12.5	
Liberal Democrats	Barry McKinstray	49	4.9	
Majority		52	5.2	
Turnout		1,009		
Labour gain from Conservative		Swing		

Throston By-Election 13 October 2022
Party	Candidate	Votes	%	±%
Labour	Cameron Sharp	450	50.8	
Independent	Jaime Horton	280	31.6	
Conservative	Jack Waterman	124	14.0	
Liberal Democrats	Barry McKinstray	32	3.6	
Majority		170	19.2	
Turnout		886		
Labour hold		Swing		

Burn Valley By-Election 19 September 2024
Party	Candidate	Votes	%	±%
Labour	Owen Riddle	475	47.5	−7.0
Reform	Amanda Napper	399	39.9	+23.9
Liberal Democrats	Barry McKinstray	89	8.9	+8.9
Green	Stephen Ashfield	36	3.6	+3.6
Majority		76	7.6	
Turnout		999		
Labour hold		Swing		

Throston By-Election 1 May 2025
Party	Candidate	Votes	%	±%
Reform	Amanda Napper	889	58.3	+42.1
Labour	Lyndsey Allen	486	31.8	−30.6
Conservative	Veronica Nicholson	151	9.9	−11.5
Majority		403	26.4	
Turnout		1,526		
Reform gain from Labour		Swing		

Throston By-Election 10 July 2025
Party	Candidate	Votes	%	±%
Reform	Ed Doyle	595	48.7	+32.5
Labour	Mark Hanson	475	38.8	−23.7
Green	Tom Casey	62	5.1	+5.1
Conservative	Margaret Lyall	59	4.8	−16.6
Liberal Democrats	Connor Stallard	32	2.6	+2.6
Majority		120	9.8	
Turnout		1,223		
Reform gain from Labour		Swing		
