= Monkey hanger =

Nickname for people from Hartlepool, County Durham, England

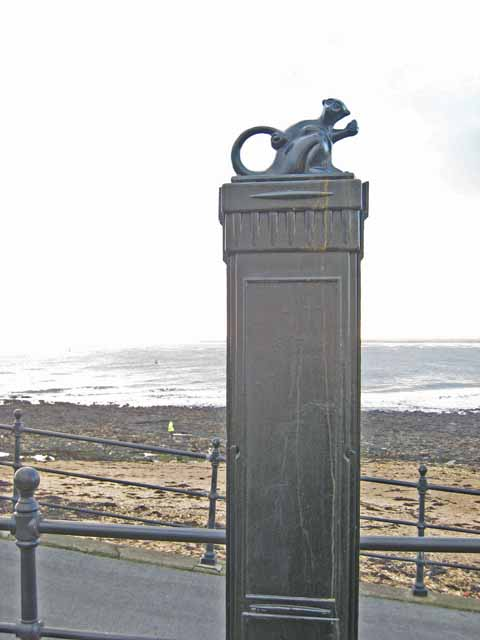
The Hartlepool Monkey monument on Hartlepool Headland

"Monkey hanger" is a colloquial nickname by which people from the town of Hartlepool in the ceremonial county of County Durham, England are sometimes known.

== Origin of the name ==
According to local folklore, the term originates from an apocryphal incident in which a monkey was hanged in the town of Hartlepool, England. The incident goes that during the French Revolutionary and Napoleonic Wars, a French chasse-marée was wrecked in a storm off the coast of Hartlepool. The only survivor from the wreck was a monkey, dressed in a French Army uniform to amuse the crew. On finding the monkey on the beach, a group of locals decided to hold an impromptu trial. Because the monkey was unable to answer their questions, and because they had seen neither a monkey nor a Frenchman before, they concluded that the monkey must be a French spy. Being found guilty, the animal was sentenced to death and hanged on the beach. In another version of the story, the monkey in question was not a real monkey, but a powder monkey, a small boy who worked below deck.

An earlier and remarkably similar monkey-hanging legend, with a similar associated song, refers to the inhabitants of Boddam, Aberdeenshire. With comparable lyrics and scansion ("And the Boddamers hung the Monkey, O"), it is plausible that 19th-century Tyneside concert hall songwriter and performer, Ned Corvan, heard and adapted the song while travelling in the Scottish Lowlands with Blind Willie Purvis. Similar stories have also been told about Mevagissey in Cornwall and Greenock in Scotland.

== The Monkey Song ==
The earliest evidenced mention of the hanging is from the popular song, written and performed by 19th-century comic performer, Ned Corvan, "The Monkey Song". Given that "only after Corvan's appearances in Hartlepool is there any strong evidence for the development of the Monkey story", the song itself seems the most plausible origin for the myth.

In former times, 'mid war an' strife,
When French invashin threaten'd life,
An' all was arm'd to the knife,
The Fishermen hung the Monkey, O!
The Fishermen wi' courage high,
Seized Monkey for a spy,
Hang him says yen, says another he'll die;
They did, an' they hung the Monkey, O!
They tried ivery means to myek him speak,
They tortor'd the Monkey tiv he loud did squeak;
Says yen that's French, says another it's Greek,
For the Fishermen then gat drunkey, O!
He's all ower hair some cheps did cry,
E'en up to summic cute an' sly;
Wiv a cod's heed then they closed an eye,
Afore they hung the Monkey, O!

== In popular culture ==
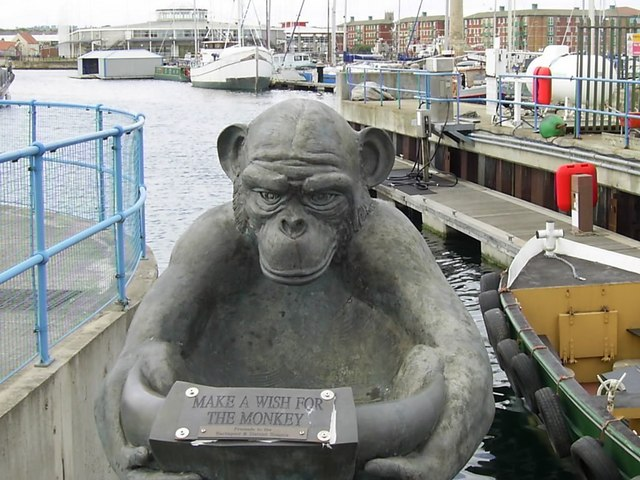
Another monkey statue at Hartlepool Marina collects coins for charity.

The local football club, Hartlepool United F.C., capitalised on their "Monkey Hangers" nickname by creating a mascot called "H'Angus the Monkey" in 1999. Two of the town's six rugby union clubs use variations of the hanging monkey, Hartlepool Rovers' crest being a beret wearing monkey hanging from a gibbet, while Hartlepool RFC neckties sport a rugby ball kicking monkey suspended from a rope. One wearer of the monkey suit, Stuart Drummond, unexpectedly became the first directly elected mayor of Hartlepool in 2002 while in the guise of H'Angus, but was forbidden from wearing the costume while in office. A statue of the monkey has been erected on the Headland; another at Hartlepool Marina (formerly in West Hartlepool) also serves to collect coins for a local hospice. Although some Hartlepool residents find the term "monkey hanger" insulting, a large number of residents have embraced the term and celebrate it as an important and unique characteristic of the town; as seen in the 2014 documentary Heart of the Pools.

The French comic book Le Singe de Hartlepool by Wilfrid Lupano and Jérémie Moreau published in 2012 tells this story.

In 2008, a novel based on the legend called The Hartlepool Monkey, written by Sean Longley, was published. The novel tells the story of the monkey, named Jacques LeSinge by the French doctor who discovers him, that was supposedly hanged. In the book, the monkey talks and possesses several other human characteristics.

The Hartlepool Monkey also featured prominently in the play Bestiary, written by Jim Burke and broadcast on BBC Radio 4 in 2003.

In 2014, a documentary was made about the Hartlepool Monkey and its long-lasting significance to the city and its inhabitants called Heart of The Pools.

A radio play by Ian Martin, The Hartlepool Spy, was broadcast on BBC Radio 4 on Christmas Day 2018, with a cast including Michael Palin, Vic Reeves, Toby Jones, Gina McKee and Monica Dolan.

The Northumbrian singer/songwriter Jez Lowe has a satirical song "The Simian Son" (originally known as "The Monkey's Revenge") that was performed first in 2012. In it, the grandson of the ill-fated monkey reveals the simian curse under which Hartlepool has been living since the hanging.

Another British singer/songwriter, Boothby Graffoe, released the single "Hartlepool" in 2021, detailing the story and relating it to other (less fictional) atrocities committed during the Napoleonic Wars.

The Spanish-Portuguese co-produced short animated film The Monkey (2021) was based on the story of The Hartlepool Monkey. The film changes the setting from England to Ireland and from the Napoleonic Wars to the Anglo-Spanish War (1585–1604) and concerning the Spanish Armada in Ireland. The film, which stars Colm Meaney, won the Goya for best Best Animated Short Film in 2021.

== See also ==
- List of British regional nicknames
- Mackem
- Mary (elephant)
- Smoggie
- Animal trial
