= 2022 Hartlepool Borough Council election =

Hartlepool Borough Council election

- 5 May 2022

13 out of 36 seats to Hartlepool Borough Council 19 seats needed for a majority

	First party	Second party
Party	Conservative	Labour
Last election	13 seats, 25.7%	11 seats, 30.7%
Seats won	5	7
Seats after	15	11
Seat change	▲2	0
Popular vote	6,678	8,290
Percentage	34.2%	42.3%
Swing	▲8.5%	▲11.6%
	Third party	Fourth party
Party	Independent	IU
Last election	10 seats, 25.6%	2 seats, 6.3%
Seats won	0	1
Seats after	8	2
Seat change	▼2	Steady
Popular vote	2,439	829
Percentage	12.5%	4.2%
Swing	▼13.1%	▼2.1%
- Winner of each seat at the 2022 Hartlepool Borough Council election
Council control before election
No overall control
Council control after election
No overall control

The 2022 Hartlepool Borough Council election took place on 5 May 2022 to elect members of Hartlepool Borough Council. This was on the same day as other local elections. 13 of the 36 seats were up for election, with 1 ward (Rural West) electing 2 councillors.

== Background ==
Hartlepool is traditionally a Labour council, with Labour forming the majority party for most of its history. The council fell into no overall control from 1976 to 1979, 2000 to 2004, 2008 to 2010, and from 2019 to the present. A coalition of Conservative, Independent Union, and Veterans and People's Party councillors took control of the council in 2019. IU and VPP councillors left their parties to join the Brexit Party in September 2019, but most rejoined their original parties in early 2020.

In the 2021 election, which was under new boundaries, the Conservatives won 13 seats with 25.75%, Labour won 11 with 30.70%, independents won 10 with 25.55%, and the Independent Union won 2 with 6.27%. Separately, the Conservatives won the 2021 Hartlepool by-election on the same day, taking the seat for the first time.

== Previous council composition ==
After 2021 election		Before 2022 election	
Party	Seats	Party	Seats
Conservative	13	Conservative	12
Labour	11	Labour	11
Independent	10	Independent	7
IU	2	IU	2
Hartlepool People	0	Hartlepool People	1
Putting Seaton First	0	Putting Seaton First	2

Changes:

- May 2021: Jim Lindridge joins Hartlepool People from independent
- February 2022: Brenda Loynes (Conservative) dies; seat left vacant until 2022 election
- Sue Little and Leisa Smith join Putting Seaton First from independent

== Results ==
2022 Hartlepool Borough Council election
Party	This election				Full council			This election		
Party	Candidates	Seats	Net	Seats %	Other	Total	Total %	Votes	Votes %	+/−
Conservative	{{{candidates}}}	5	▲2	38.5	10	15	41.7	6,678	34.2	+8.5
Labour	{{{candidates}}}	7	0	53.8	4	11	30.6	8,290	42.3	+11.6
Independent	{{{candidates}}}	0	▼2	0.0	8	8	22.2	2,439	12.5	-13.1
IU	{{{candidates}}}	1	0	7.7	1	2	5.6	829	4.2	-2.1
Reform	{{{candidates}}}	0	0	0.0	0	0	0.0	469	2.4	+0.1
Liberal Democrats	{{{candidates}}}	0	0	0.0	0	0	0.0	413	2.1	+1.5
For Britain	{{{candidates}}}	0	0	0.0	0	0	0.0	203	1.0	-0.9
North East	{{{candidates}}}	0	0	0.0	0	0	0.0	191	1.0	New

== Results by ward ==
An asterisk indicates an incumbent councillor.

=== Burn Valley ===
Burn Valley
Party	Candidate	Votes	%	±%
Labour	Jonathan Brash*	1,183	69.0	+34.6
Conservative	James Brewer	531	31.0	−7.9
Majority		652	38.0	
Turnout				
Labour hold		Swing		

=== De Bruce ===
De Bruce
Party	Candidate	Votes	%	±%
Labour	Rachel Creevy*	723	51.7	+21.3
Conservative	David Normandale	377	27.0	−12.7
For Britain	Anne Marie Waters	203	14.5	−7.7
Independent	Tony Mann	95	6.8	N/A
Majority		346	24.7	
Turnout				
Labour hold		Swing		

=== Fens & Greatham ===
Fens & Greatham
Party	Candidate	Votes	%	±%
Conservative	Bob Buchan	964	51.1	+29.9
Labour	Jennifer Elliott*	922	48.9	+27.4
Majority		42	2.2	
Turnout				
Conservative gain from Labour		Swing		

=== Foggy Furze ===
Foggy Furze
Party	Candidate	Votes	%	±%
Labour	Melanie Morley	631	39.6	+14.8
Independent	Darren Price*	490	30.7	+2.9
Conservative	Julie Normandale	391	24.5	−12.8
Liberal Democrats	Barry McKinstray	82	5.1	N/A
Majority		141	8.9	
Turnout				
Labour gain from Independent		Swing		

=== Hart ===
Hart
Party	Candidate	Votes	%	±%
Conservative	John Leedham	637	38.7	−15.7
Labour	Cameron Sharp	562	34.1	+13.5
Independent	Sam Lee	448	27.2	N/A
Majority		75	4.6	
Turnout				
Conservative gain from Independent		Swing		

=== Headland & Harbour ===
Headland & Harbour
Party	Candidate	Votes	%	±%
IU	Shane Moore*	683	44.8	+7.1
Labour	Carole Thompson	514	33.7	+9.5
Conservative	Tom Bird	326	21.4	−18.2
Majority		169	11.1	
Turnout				
IU hold		Swing		

=== Manor House ===
Manor House
Party	Candidate	Votes	%	±%
Labour	Pamela Hargreaves*	612	50.2	+19.4
Conservative	Robert Darby	338	27.7	−13.4
Independent	Donna Hotham	138	11.3	−5.6
Reform	Steve Wright	131	10.7	+1.8
Majority		274	22.5	
Turnout				
Labour hold		Swing		

=== Rossmere ===
Rossmere
Party	Candidate	Votes	%	±%
Labour	Moss Boddy*	503	42.6	+13.4
Independent	Jaime Horton	366	31.0	N/A
Conservative	Marc Owens	268	22.7	−18.2
Reform	Steve Sandick	43	3.6	−3.4
Majority		137	11.6	
Turnout				
Labour hold		Swing		

=== Rural West ===
Rural West
Party	Candidate	Votes	%	±%
Conservative	Andrew Martin-Wells	1,188	54.3	−5.5
Conservative	Scott Reeve	1,144	52.3	+2.5
Labour	Malcolm Walker	626	28.6	+8.6
Independent	Darab Rezai	496	22.7	+6.2
Liberal Democrats	Vivienne Neville	331	15.1	N/A
North East	John Tait	191	8.7	N/A
Majority				
Turnout			2,186	
Conservative hold		Swing		
Conservative hold		Swing		

=== Seaton ===
Seaton
Party	Candidate	Votes	%	±%
Conservative	Gordon Cranney*	944	55.6	+15.0
Labour	Martin Dunbar	460	27.1	+11.8
Reform	Glynis Jones	295	17.4	+14.7
Majority		484	28.5	
Turnout				
Conservative hold		Swing		

=== Throston ===
Throston
Party	Candidate	Votes	%	±%
Labour	Amy Prince*	765	50.7	+14.0
Independent	Katherine Cook	406	26.9	N/A
Conservative	Morgan Barker	339	22.5	N/A
Majority		359	23.8	
Turnout				
Labour hold		Swing		

=== Victoria ===
Victoria
Party	Candidate	Votes	%	±%
Labour	Gary Allen	789	60.2	+23.1
Conservative	Jane Reeve	375	28.6	−8.9
IU	Trevor Rogan	146	11.1	+0.9
Majority		414	31.6	
Turnout				
Labour hold		Swing		

== By-elections ==
=== Foggy Furze ===
Foggy Furze: 8 September 2022
Party	Candidate	Votes	%	±%
Labour	Carole Thompson	443	43.9	+4.3
Conservative	Pam Shurmer	391	38.8	
Independent	Connor Stallard	126	12.5	N/A
Liberal Democrats	Barry McKinstray	49	4.9	N/A
Majority		52		
Turnout		1,009		
Labour gain from Independent		Swing		

=== Throston ===
Throston: 13 October 2022
Party	Candidate	Votes	%	±%
Labour	Cameron Sharp	450	50.8	+0.1
Independent	Jaime Horton	280	31.6	+4.7
Conservative	Jack Waterman	124	14.0	−8.5
Liberal Democrats	Barry McKinstray	32	3.6	N/A
Majority		170	19.2	
Turnout		886		
Labour hold		Swing	▼2.3	
