= H'Angus =

Official mascot of Hartlepool United

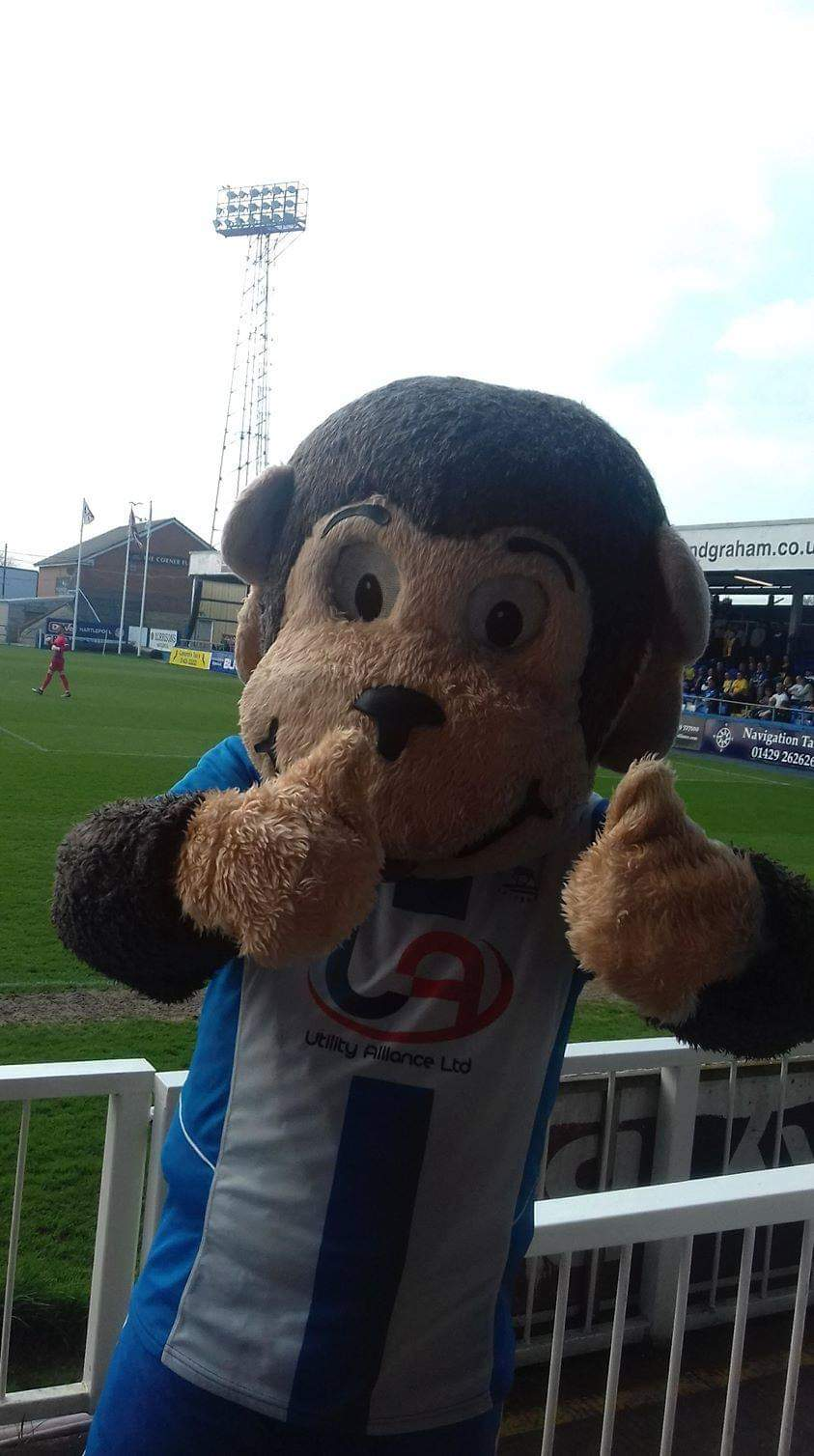
Hartlepool United mascot H'Angus.

H'Angus the Monkey is the official mascot of Hartlepool United. The name "H'Angus" is a pun of the word hang and the name Angus, and is derived from the monkey hanger legend of Hartlepool. The mascot made his debut on 31 October 1999, during Hartlepool's first round FA Cup victory over Millwall.

== People known to have played the role of H'Angus ==
=== James Auton ===
The first person known to have "played" H'Angus was James Auton who was a big Hartlepool fan and who launched the character on TV show Soccer AM with guest Robbie Fowler on the show.

=== Stuart Drummond ===
Stuart Drummond was the second person to play him. Drummond became the most popular version of H'Angus with his outrageous antics. During an away match against Scunthorpe United during the 2000-01 Third Division season, H'Angus was famously thrown out for the first time in his career. A steward took offence at H'Angus standing up and leading the Hartlepool fans in song. H'Angus once again angered the stewards when he simulated sex on a female steward and he was promptly escorted away in front of a bemused set of away supporters.

Drummond caused even more controversy during the first leg of Hartlepool's play-off match away to Blackpool on 13 May 2001, after he played with an inflated doll. H'Angus was once again escorted off by police but was released without charge. A police spokesman later claimed that H'Angus had been "drunk". At a game at Rochdale, H'Angus was involved in a fun fight with Desmond The Dragon during a half-time penalty shoot-out and punched the dragon's head off. At a game at Chester, H'Angus was asked to perform the half-time lottery draw. He subsequently pulled all the tickets out of the tombola, threw them in the air and walked away without picking a winner.

==== Drummond's mayoral election and subsequent re-elections ====
Drummond approached Hartlepool chairman Ken Hodcroft with an idea for some publicity and asked him to fund the £500 deposit that would allow him to stand for election. Hodcroft accepted the proposal but wanted the club to stay out of politics so forced Drummond to make the agenda his own and separate from the club. Drummond ran for mayor under his own name, campaigning for "free bananas" for all schoolchildren. He campaigned both at matches, much to the bemusement of opposition fans, and also locally and away from the football pitch. On 2 May 2002, days after Pools' play-off semi-final defeat at Cheltenham and an extension to the season that allowed the campaigning monkey to carry on his drive for votes, Drummond was elected the first directly elected mayor of Hartlepool. Drummond immediately decided to concentrate on politics and ceased being H'Angus; he was quoted as saying, "I am Stuart Drummond, I am the Mayor of Hartlepool, not the monkey." Drummond was re-elected in 2005, more than doubling his vote (up to over 16,000) and increasing his majority to over 10,000. At the same time, turnout increased from 30% to 51%. On the night of the election count, he proposed to his girlfriend, Rebecca Buttery, who accepted. In 2009, Drummond was re-elected for a third term.

=== Ceri Anderson ===
The departure of Drummond forced Hartlepool to hold auditions for a new person to take over the role of H'Angus. Dozens of fans applied for the auditions and they were cut down to six. The final six auditionees then had to wear the famous costume and perform for a half during Hartlepool's pre-season friendlies. Student Ceri Anderson was deemed the "most monkey-like" and won the job as H'Angus. She had applied for the job after being encouraged by her 7-year-old son, Ralf. Anderson refused to enter the world of politics and is quoted as saying, "I came into the job because I'm a Hartlepool fan, not because I'm looking to start a career in politics." Predecessor Stuart Drummond praised her for her performance as H'Angus.

=== Scott Llewellyn ===
Scott Llewellyn was the next person to take the role. During his time as H'Angus, he has achieved a third-place finish in the WBX Mascot Grand National. He followed this by competing in the Great North Run, where he raised over £555. Llewellyn aimed to lose weight in order to be a more energetic mascot and has won a competition to help him do so. Llewellyn remains a big Pools fan and has worked in the club's hospitality areas since standing down as mascot. He also has H'Angus the Monkey tattoos.

=== Michael Evans ===
Michael Evans was the last man behind the monkey suit playing H'angus and was in the role for 7 seasons before he was told by the club his services were no longer required and he received his P45 from the club during a round of cutbacks and redundancies. He has taken part in numerous challenges while wearing the famous monkey suit from doing the Great North Run and walking with Jeff Stelling, raising thousands of pounds for charities. Evans remains a huge fan of the club and also has H'Angus the Monkey tattoos.
