= John Tennant (politician) =

British politician (born 1986)

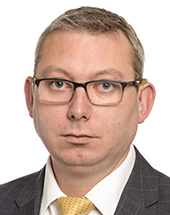

Member of the European Parliament for North East England
- In office 2 July 2019 – 31 January 2020
- Preceded by: Paul Brannen
- Succeeded by: constituency abolished

Leader of the Independent Union
- In office 18 February 2019 – 6 May 2021
- Preceded by: Party established
- Succeeded by: Shane Moore

Councillor for Hartlepool Borough Council (Jesmond Ward)
- In office 5 May 2016 – 6 May 2021

Personal details
- Born: John David Edward Tennant; 25 December 1986 (age 39) Newcastle upon Tyne, England
- Party: Reform UK (2019–present); Independent Union (2019–2021)
- Other political affiliations: UKIP (2016–2018)
- Website: Council website

John David Edward Tennant (born 25 December 1986) is a British politician, who was a Brexit Party Member of the European Parliament (MEP) for the North East of England between 2019 and the United Kingdom's withdrawal from the EU. Tennant is also the co-founder and former party leader of Independent Union, of which he was a councillor on Hartlepool Borough Council for the Jesmond ward.

In September 2019, all IU councillors, as well as the one Veterans and People's Party councillor, who made up the coalition at Hartlepool Borough Council defected to the Brexit Party, renaming their already existing coalition with the three Conservative councillors to the "Brexit and Conservative Coalition". Despite this, the IU was still registered with the Electoral Commission with Tennant listed as its current leader. Tennant stepped down from the IU leadership in February 2020 and was replaced by Shane Moore.

== 2019 European Parliament election ==
In May 2019, it was announced John Tennant was standing as a Brexit Party candidate in the 2019 European Parliament election for North East England. Upon the announcement, Tennant was criticised for comments he made on social media, praising the UKIP MEP Godfrey Bloom on the day he was ejected from the European parliament for addressing German colleague, Martin Schulz, the then leader of the German Social Democratic Party, with a Nazi slogan in 2010, and then another involving a joke he made regarding sex acts with a young woman in 2011. A spokesperson for the Brexit Party described his comments, which included discussing sex toys in "vulgar and obscene terms" and suggesting Liverpool FC fans are criminals, as "weak jokes".

Tennant, the former UKIP group leader for Hartlepool Borough Council, is said to have a close relationship with Nigel Farage whilst he was a UKIP councillor, organising his public events in the North East, according to a former UKIP advisor. According to Hartleborough Borough Council's Register of Members' Disclosable Pecuniary Interests, in May 2018 Tennant declared his profession as "office manager" to then MEP, Jonathan Arnott.
