= England and Wales mayoral referendums =

Map showing referendum results by authority.

The Local Government Act 2000 has allowed for local authorities in England and Wales to adopt a mayor-and-cabinet model, or to end its adoption, through local referendums.

As of July 2025, there have been 55 local referendums on the question of changing executive arrangements to a model with a directly elected mayor and 9 local referendums on the question of changing executive arrangements to a model without a directly elected mayor.

== Referendums on introduction of mayor-cabinet system ==
"Yes" majority shown in green, "No" majority shown in red.

Local authority	Date	Yes votes	Yes vote %	No votes	No vote %	Turnout %	Ref
Berwick-upon-Tweed	7 June 2001	3,617	26	10,212	74	64	
Cheltenham	28 June 2001	8,083	33	16,602	67	32	
Gloucester	28 June 2001	7,731	32	16,317	68	31	
Watford	12 July 2001	7,636	52	7,140	48	25	
Doncaster	20 September 2001	35,453	65	19,398	35	25	
Kirklees	4 October 2001	10,169	27	27,977	73	13	
Sunderland	11 October 2001	9,375	43	12,209	57	10	
Brighton & Hove	18 October 2001	22,724	38	37,214	62	32	
Hartlepool	18 October 2001	10,667	51	10,294	49	34	
Lewisham	18 October 2001	16,822	51	15,914	49	18	
Middlesbrough	18 October 2001	29,067	84	5,422	16	34	
North Tyneside	18 October 2001	30,262	58	22,296	42	36	
Sedgefield	18 October 2001	10,628	47	11,869	53	33	
Redditch	8 November 2001	7,250	44	9,198	56	28	
Durham	20 November 2001	8,327	41	11,974	59	29	
Harrow	6 December 2001	17,502	43	23,554	57	26	
Plymouth	24 January 2002	29,559	41	42,811	59	40	
Harlow	24 January 2002	5,296	25	15,490	75	25	
Newham	31 January 2002	27,263	68	12,687	32	26	
Southwark	31 January 2002	6,054	31	13,217	69	11	
West Devon	31 January 2002	3,555	23	12,190	77	42	
Shepway	31 January 2002	11,357	44	14,438	56	36	
Bedford	21 February 2002	11,316	67	5,537	33	16	
Hackney	2 May 2002	24,697	59	10,547	41	32	
Mansfield	2 May 2002	8,973	55	7,350	45	21	
Newcastle-under-Lyme	2 May 2002	12,912	44	16,468	56	31.5	
Oxford	2 May 2002	14,692	44	18,686	56	34	
Stoke-on-Trent	2 May 2002	28,601	58	20,578	42	27	
Corby	1 October 2002	5,351	46	6,239	54	31	
Ealing	12 December 2002	9,454	45	11,655	55	10	
Ceredigion	20 May 2004	5,308	27	14,013	73	36	
Isle of Wight	5 May 2005	28,786	43.7	37,097	56.3	60.4	
Fenland	14 July 2005	5,509	24.2	17,296	75.8	33.6	
Torbay	14 July 2005	18,074	55.2	14,682	44.8	32.1	
Crewe and Nantwich	4 May 2006	11,808	38.2	18,768	60.8	35.3	
Darlington	27 September 2007	7,981	41.6	11,226	58.4	24.6	
Bury	3 July 2008	10,338	40.1	15,425	59.9	18.3	
Tower Hamlets	6 May 2010	60,758	60.3	39,857	39.7	62.1	
Great Yarmouth	5 May 2011	10,051	39.2	15,595	60.8	36	
Salford	26 January 2012	17,344	56.0	13,653	44.0	18.1	
Birmingham	3 May 2012	88,085	42.2	120,611	57.8	28.35	
Bradford	3 May 2012	53,949	44.9	66,283	55.1	35	
Bristol	3 May 2012	41,032	53	35,880	47	24	
Coventry	3 May 2012	22,619	36.4	39,483	63.6	26.6	
Leeds	3 May 2012	62,440	36.7	107,910	63.3	31	
Manchester	3 May 2012	42,677	46.8	48,593	53.2	25.3	
Newcastle upon Tyne	3 May 2012	24,630	38.1	40,089	61.9		
Nottingham	3 May 2012	20,943	42.5	28,320	57.5	23.9	
Sheffield	3 May 2012	44,571	35.0	82,890	65.0		
Wakefield	3 May 2012	27,610	37.8	45,357	62.2		
Copeland	22 May 2014	12,671	69.8	5,489	30.2	33.9	
Bath and North East Somerset	10 March 2016	8,054	20.8	30,557	79.1	28.9	
Guildford	13 October 2016	4,948	19.3	20,369	80.6	24.9	
Croydon	7 October 2021	47,165	80.0	11,519	19.5	21	
Plymouth	17 July 2025	18,044	47.6	19,840	52.4	19.11	

== Referendums on removal of the mayor-cabinet system ==
There have been nine referendums on the question of removing the post of elected mayor. Four mayoral posts have been disestablished following a vote and five retained.

"Retain" majority shown in green, "Remove" majority shown in red.

Local authority	Date	Retain votes	Retain vote %	Remove votes	Remove vote %	Turnout %	Ref
Stoke-on-Trent	23 October 2008	14,592	41	21,231	59	19.2	
Doncaster	3 May 2012	42,196	61.7	25,879	37.8	30.7	
Hartlepool	15 Nov 2012	5,177	41.3	7,366	58.7	18	
Middlesbrough	26 September 2013	8,674	57.3	6,455	42.7	15	
North Tyneside	5 May 2016	32,546	57.8	23,730	42.2	36.4	
Torbay	5 May 2016	9,511	37.5	15,846	62.5	25.3	
Newham	6 May 2021	45,960	55.8	36,424	44.2	37.68	
Tower Hamlets	6 May 2021	63,029	77.8	17,951	22.2	41.79	
Bristol	5 May 2022	38,439	41	56,113	59	28.6	

== Referendums on the introduction of the committee model ==
Local authority	Date	Yes votes	Yes vote %	No votes	No vote %	Turnout %	Ref
Sheffield	3 May 2012	89,670	64.8	48,727	35.2	N/A	

== See also ==
- 2012 English mayoral referendums
