= 2023 Hartlepool Borough Council election =

2023 UK local government election

← 2022	4 May 2023	2024 →

12 out of 36 seats to Hartlepool Borough Council 19 seats needed for a majority
- Turnout: 24.20%

	First party	Second party
Leader	Brenda Harrison	Mike Young
Party	Labour	Conservative
Last election	11 seats, 42.3%	15 seats, 34.2%
Seats before	13	13
Seats after	18	12
Seat change	▲5	▼1
	Third party	Fourth party
Leader	N/A	Shane Moore
Party	Independent	IU
Last election	8 seats, 12.5%	2 seats, 4.2%
Seats before	8	2
Seats after	5	1
Seat change	▼3	▼1
- Winner of each seat at the 2023 Hartlepool Borough Council election
Leader before election
Shane Moore
Independent Union
No overall control
Leader after election
Mike Young
Conservative
No overall control

The 2023 Hartlepool Borough Council election took place on 4 May 2023 to elect members of Hartlepool Borough Council in County Durham, England. This was on the same day as other local elections across England.

Prior to the election the council was under no overall control, being run by a coalition of the Conservatives and Independent Union, led by Shane Moore of the Independent Union. The council remained under no overall control after the election. Labour made significant gains but remained one seat short of taking a majority. The Conservatives and independents formed an administration after the election, with Conservative leader Mike Young being appointed leader of the council at the subsequent annual council meeting on 16 May 2023.

== Summary ==
=== Election result ===
2023 Hartlepool Borough Council election
Party	This election			Full council			This election		
Party	Seats	Net	Seats %	Other	Total	Total %	Votes	Votes %	+/−
Labour	9	▲5	75.0	9	18	50.0	7,630	44.6	+2.3
Conservative	2	▼1	16.7	10	12	33.3	3,864	22.6	–11.6
Independent	1	▼3	8.3	4	5	13.9	3,532	20.6	+8.1
IU	0	▼1	0.0	1	1	2.8	535	3.1	-1.1
Reform UK	0	0	0.0	0	0	0.0	1,289	7.5	+5.1
Liberal Democrats	0	0	0.0	0	0	0.0	263	1.5	-0.6

== Ward results ==
The Statement of Persons Nominated, which details the candidates standing in each ward, was released by Hartlepool Borough Council following the close of nominations on 5 April 2023.

=== Burn Valley ===
Burn Valley
Party	Candidate	Votes	%	±%
Labour	Ged Hall*	895	60.8	−8.2
Conservative	Margaret Lyall	271	18.4	−12.6
Independent	John Hayes	197	13.4	N/A
Reform UK	James Brewer	108	7.3	−23.7
Majority		624	42.4	
Turnout		1,471		
Labour hold				

=== De Bruce ===
De Bruce
Party	Candidate	Votes	%	±%
Labour Co-op	Brenda Harrison*	759	63.84	+11.1
Reform UK	Paul Manley	237	19.93	N/A
Conservative	Rodney Pangbourne	193	16.23	−10.8
Majority		522	43.91	
Turnout		1,189		
Labour Co-op hold				

=== Fens & Greatham ===
Fens & Greatham
Party	Candidate	Votes	%	±%
Labour Co-op	Philip Holbrook	780	41.69	−8.2
Conservative	Marc Owens	468	25.01	−26.1
Independent	Angela Falconer*	307	16.41	N/A
Independent	Tony Richardson	220	11.76	N/A
Reform UK	Roger Scott Jones	96	5.13	N/A
Majority		312	16.68	
Turnout		1,871		
Labour Co-op gain from Independent				

=== Foggy Furze ===
-

Foggy Furze
Party	Candidate	Votes	%	±%
Labour Co-op	Martin Dunbar	711	52.39	+12.8
Conservative	Kevin Tiplady*	372	27.41	+2.9
Liberal Democrats	Barry McKinstray	173	12.75	+7.7
Reform UK	Leah Syead	101	7.44	N/A
Majority		339	24.98	
Turnout		1,357		
Labour Co-op gain from Conservative				

=== Hart ===
-

Hart
Party	Candidate	Votes	%	±%
Conservative	Rob Darby	493	31.56	−7.1
Labour	David Innes	491	31.43	−2.7
Independent	Rob Cook*	477	30.54	N/A
Independent	Pauline Phillips	101	6.47	N/A
Majority		2	0.13	
Turnout		1,562		
Conservative gain from Independent				

=== Headland & Harbour ===
Headland & Harbour
Party	Candidate	Votes	%	±%
Labour Co-op	Matthew Dodds	550	40.80	+7.1
IU	Tim Fleming*	535	39.69	−5.1
Conservative	Arthur Southcott	263	19.51	−1.9
Majority		15	1.11	
Turnout		1,348		
Labour Co-op gain from IU				

=== Manor House ===
Manor House
Party	Candidate	Votes	%	±%
Labour Co-op	Ben Clayton*	549	58.16	+8.0
Conservative	Angela Jackson	176	18.64	−9.1
Reform UK	Steve Wright	129	13.67	+3.0
Liberal Democrats	Donna Hotham	90	9.53	−1.8
Majority		373	39.52	
Turnout		944		
Labour Co-op hold				

=== Rossmere ===
Rossmere
Party	Candidate	Votes	%	±%
Labour Co-op	Tom Feeney*	538	52.03	+9.4
Independent	Jaime Horton	375	36.27	+5.3
Reform UK	Tracy Connolly	121	11.70	+8.1
Majority		163	15.76	
Turnout		1,034		
Labour Co-op hold				

=== Rural West ===
Rural West
Party	Candidate	Votes	%	±%
Conservative	Mike Young*	980	47.39	−6.9
Labour Co-op	Malcolm Walker	563	27.22	−1.4
Independent	Pam Shurmer	450	21.76	N/A
Reform UK	John O'Brien	75	3.63	N/A
Majority		417	20.17	
Turnout		2,068		
Conservative hold				

=== Seaton ===
Seaton
Party	Candidate	Votes	%	±%
Independent	Leisa Smith*	850	52.12	N/A
Conservative	Josh Bagnall	318	19.50	−36.1
Labour	Ralph Gabbatiss	316	19.38	−7.7
Reform UK	Glynis Jones	147	9.01	−8.4
Majority		532	32.62	
Turnout		1,631		
Independent hold				

=== Throston ===
Throston
Party	Candidate	Votes	%	±%
Labour Co-op	Steve Wallace	717	50.25	−0.4
Independent	Peter Jackson*	555	38.89	N/A
Reform UK	Trevor Rogan	155	10.86	N/A
Majority		162	11.36	
Turnout		1,427		
Labour Co-op gain from Independent				

=== Victoria ===
Victoria
Party	Candidate	Votes	%	±%
Labour Co-op	Karen Oliver	761	62.84	+2.6
Conservative	Misra Bano-Mahroo	330	27.25	−1.3
Reform UK	Thomas Bird	120	9.91	N/A
Majority		431	35.59	
Turnout		1,211		
Labour Co-op hold				

== Changes 2023–2024 ==
Steve Wallace, elected as a Labour councillor, left the party in July 2023 to sit as an independent.
