= 2021 Hartlepool Borough Council election =

2021 UK local government election

Hartlepool Council election 2021
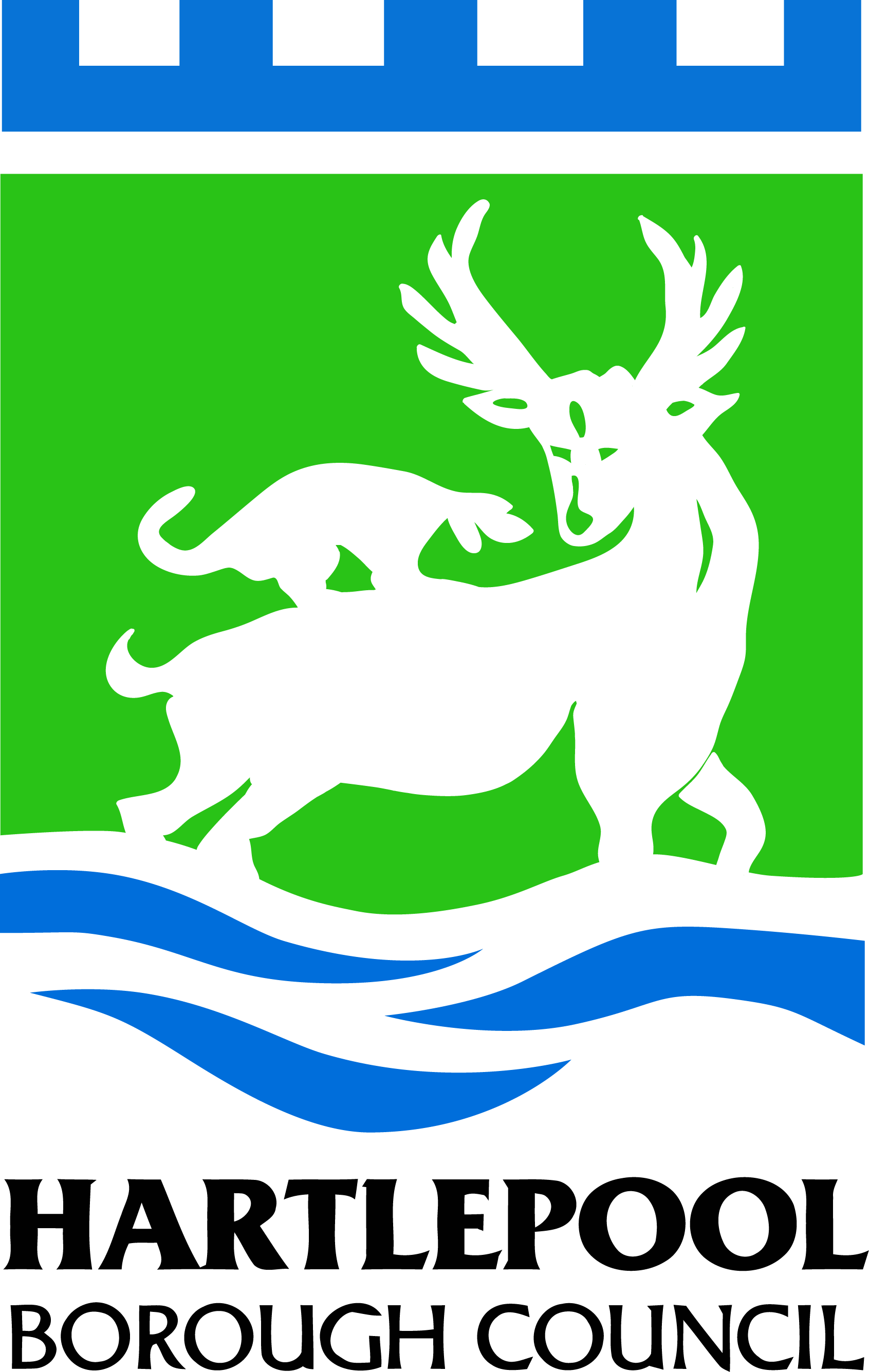
| ← 2019 | 6 May 2021 | 2022 → |

36 Seats up for Election 19 seats needed for a majority
| | First party | Second party |
|---|---|---|
| Party | Conservative | Labour |
| Seats before | 3 | 14 |
| Seats won | 13 | 11 |
| Seats after | 13 | 11 |
| Seat change | ▲10 | ▼3 |
- Winner of each seat at the 2021 Hartlepool Borough Council election

The 2021 Hartlepool Borough Council election took place on 6 May 2021 as part of the 2021 local elections in the United Kingdom. A by-election for the Hartlepool constituency, which has identical boundaries to the council, was held on the same day.

== Boundary changes ==
In February 2019 the Local Government Boundary Commission for England confirmed changes to the electoral wards of Hartlepool. All 36 seats were up for election, after which, starting in 2022 elections to the council will be done in thirds.

== Result summary ==
Changes in seat numbers are compared with the composition of the council immediately prior to the election. Changes in vote share are compared with the previous election in 2019.

Hartlepool Borough Council 2021 election
| Party | Seats | Gains | Losses | Net gain/loss | Seats % | Votes % | Votes | +/− |
|---|---|---|---|---|---|---|---|---|
| Conservative | 13 | 9 | 0 | +11 | 36.11 | 25.75 | 16,001 | |
| Labour | 11 | 3 | 0 | +3 | 30.56 | 30.70 | 19,079 | |
| Independent | 10 | 0 | 0 | 0 | 27.78 | 25.55 | 15,876 | |
| IU | 2 | 0 | 0 | 0 | 5.56 | 6.27 | 3,896 | |
| VPP | 0 | - | - | 0 | 0.00 | 6.27 | 3,896 | |
| Reform UK | 0 | - | - | 0 | 0.00 | 2.29 | 1,425 | |
| For Britain | 0 | - | - | 0 | 0.00 | 1.92 | 1,191 | |
| Liberal Democrats | 0 | - | - | 0 | 0.00 | 0.59 | 368 | +0.10 |
| SDP | 0 | - | - | 0 | 0.00 | 0.36 | 225 | |
| Heritage | 0 | - | - | 0 | 0.00 | 0.21 | 133 | |
| Socialist Labour | 0 | - | - | 0 | 0.00 | 0.11 | 68 | |

== Council composition ==
Prior to the election the composition of the council was:

- Conservative Party: 4
- Labour Party: 8
- Independent Union: 6
- Socialist Labour Party: 4
- Veterans and People's Party: 1
- For Britain Movement: 1
- Independent: 4
- Vacant: 3

Following the election the composition of the council was:

- Conservative Party: 13
- Labour Party: 11
- Independent: 10
- Independent Union: 2

== Ward results ==
The Statement of Persons Nominated was published on the 9 April.

=== Burn Valley ===
Burn Valley (3 seats)
| Party | Candidate | Votes | % | ±% |
|---|---|---|---|---|
| Conservative | David Nicholson | 1,001 | 38.9 | |
| Independent | Ged Hall | 897 | 34.8 | |
| Labour | Jonathan James Frederick Brash | 887 | 34.4 | |
| Independent | John Lauderdale | 698 | 27.1 | |
| Labour | Shay Miah | 652 | 25.3 | |
| Independent | Mitchell Green | 553 | 21.5 | |
| SDP | Lynne Patricia Humphries | 225 | 8.7 | |
| VPP | John William Hays | 208 | 8.1 | |
| Turnout | | | | |

=== De Bruce ===
De Bruce (3 seats)
| Party | Candidate | Votes | % | ±% |
|---|---|---|---|---|
| Conservative | Veronica Nicholson | 858 | 39.7 | |
| Labour | Brenda Harrison | 832 | 38.5 | |
| Labour | Rachel Jayne Creevy | 658 | 30.4 | |
| For Britain | Karen Louise King | 643 | 29.7 | |
| Labour | Anthony George Traynor | 613 | 28.4 | |
| For Britain | Anne Marie Waters | 479 | 22.2 | |
| VPP | Peter Joyce | 207 | 9.6 | |
| IU | John Russell Leedham | 203 | 9.4 | |
| Turnout | | | | |

=== Fens and Greatham ===
Fens and Greatham (3 seats)
| Party | Candidate | Votes | % | ±% |
|---|---|---|---|---|
| Independent | Jim Lindridge | 1,320 | 45.9 | |
| Conservative | Angela Falconer | 1,306 | 45.4 | |
| Labour | Jennifer Elliott | 619 | 21.5 | |
| IU | Bob Buchan | 609 | 21.2 | |
| Labour | Angie Swinbourne | 439 | 15.3 | |
| Labour | Ann Patricia Tweedy | 420 | 14.6 | |
| Independent | George Robins | 402 | 14.0 | |
| IU | James Brewer | 310 | 10.8 | |
| VPP | Paul Tucker | 207 | 7.2 | |
| Turnout | | | | |

=== Foggy Furze ===
Foggy Furze (3 seats)
| Party | Candidate | Votes | % | ±% |
|---|---|---|---|---|
| Independent | Stephen Picton | 1,007 | 37.7 | |
| Conservative | Kevin Robert Tiplady | 994 | 37.3 | |
| Independent | Darren Price | 742 | 27.8 | |
| Labour | Lyndsey Allen | 661 | 24.8 | |
| Labour | Corinne Jean Helen Male | 620 | 23.2 | |
| Labour | Frazer Daniel Healy | 560 | 21.0 | |
| VPP | Peter William Cartwright | 479 | 18.0 | |
| VPP | Lee Peter Cartwright | 380 | 14.2 | |
| VPP | Terry Hughes | 265 | 9.9 | |
| Reform UK | Tom Bird | 127 | 4.8 | |
| For Britain | Graham Patrick Craddy | 69 | 2.6 | |
| Turnout | | | | |

=== Hart ===
Hart (3 seats)
| Party | Candidate | Votes | % | ±% |
|---|---|---|---|---|
| Conservative | Tom Cassidy | 1,464 | 54.4 | |
| Independent | Rob Cook | 804 | 29.9 | |
| Independent | John Riddle | 773 | 28.7 | |
| Labour | Melanie Linda Morley | 649 | 24.1 | |
| Labour | Cameron Sharp | 554 | 20.6 | |
| Labour | David Innes | 537 | 19.9 | |
| VPP | Elver Alicarte | 264 | 9.8 | |
| Turnout | | | | |

=== Headland and Harbour ===
Headland and Harbour (3 seats)
| Party | Candidate | Votes | % | ±% |
|---|---|---|---|---|
| Conservative | Brian Cowie | 960 | 39.6 | |
| IU | Tim Fleming | 951 | 39.2 | |
| IU | Shane Robert Moore | 914 | 37.7 | |
| IU | Barbara Ward | 694 | 28.6 | |
| Labour | Alison Hockburn | 586 | 24.2 | |
| Labour | Sophie Chapman | 582 | 24.0 | |
| Labour | Matthew Alexander Dodds | 560 | 23.1 | |
| VPP | Mark Stacey | 173 | 7.1 | |
| Independent | Adam Gaines | 99 | 4.1 | |
| Turnout | | | | |

=== Manor House ===
Manor House (3 seats)
| Party | Candidate | Votes | % | ±% |
|---|---|---|---|---|
| Conservative | James Henry Ashton | 764 | 41.1 | |
| Labour | Ben Clayton | 667 | 35.8 | |
| Labour | Pam Hargreaves | 573 | 30.8 | |
| Labour | Steve Wallace | 543 | 29.2 | |
| Independent | Donna Hotham | 315 | 16.9 | |
| Independent | Jaime Horton | 253 | 13.6 | |
| Independent | Kathy Dales | 245 | 13.2 | |
| VPP | Richy Horsley | 228 | 12.3 | |
| Reform UK | Stephen Wright | 166 | 8.9 | |
| VPP | Jean Thomson | 138 | 7.4 | |
| Reform UK | Linda Parker | 116 | 6.2 | |
| Reform UK | Trevor Rogan | 68 | 3.7 | |
| Turnout | | | | |

=== Rossmere ===
Moss Brody was elected in 3rd Place by drawing straws

Rossmere (3 seats)
| Party | Candidate | Votes | % | ±% |
|---|---|---|---|---|
| Conservative | Christopher David Groves | 783 | 40.9 | |
| Labour | Tom Feeney | 600 | 31.3 | |
| Labour | Moss Boddy * | 558 | 29.2 | |
| Labour | Julie Patricia Clayton * | 558 | 29.2 | |
| VPP | Anthony James Richardson | 318 | 16.6 | |
| VPP | Antony Baker | 297 | 15.5 | |
| VPP | Graham Lloyd Harrison | 221 | 11.5 | |
| Liberal Democrats | Lynne Gillam | 141 | 7.4 | |
| Reform UK | Jill Herring | 134 | 7.0 | |
| Liberal Democrats | Vivienne Julia Mary Neville | 126 | 6.6 | |
| Reform UK | Scott Kenny | 125 | 6.5 | |
| Liberal Democrats | Michael Noppen | 101 | 5.3 | |
| Reform UK | Billy Yull | 83 | 4.3 | |
| Turnout | | | | |

- = Straws drawn due to tie

=== Rural West ===
Rural West (3 seats)
| Party | Candidate | Votes | % | ±% |
|---|---|---|---|---|
| Conservative | Brenda Loynes | 2,184 | 63.9 | |
| Conservative | Mike Young | 2,043 | 59.8 | |
| Conservative | Cameron Stokell | 1,700 | 49.8 | |
| Labour | Malcolm Walker | 683 | 20.0 | |
| Independent | Darab Rezai | 562 | 16.5 | |
| Independent | Alex Williamson | 435 | 12.7 | |
| Independent | Adrian Gaines | 147 | 4.3 | |
| Turnout | | | | |

=== Seaton ===
Seaton (3 seats)
| Party | Candidate | Votes | % | ±% |
|---|---|---|---|---|
| Independent | Sue Little | 1,804 | 63.2 | |
| Independent | Leisa Smith | 1,462 | 51.2 | |
| Conservative | Gordon Cranney | 1,157 | 40.6 | |
| Independent | Dave Hunter | 668 | 23.4 | |
| Labour | Martin Dunbar | 437 | 15.3 | |
| VPP | Scott Standing | 311 | 10.9 | |
| Reform UK | Stefan Anthony Morgan | 78 | 2.7 | |
| Turnout | | | | |

=== Throston ===
Throston (3 seats)
| Party | Candidate | Votes | % | ±% |
|---|---|---|---|---|
| Independent | Paddy Brown | 1,014 | 43.2 | |
| Independent | Peter Jackson | 875 | 37.3 | |
| Labour | Amy Prince | 862 | 36.7 | |
| Labour | Gary Allen | 828 | 35.3 | |
| Labour | Ron Watts | 654 | 27.9 | |
| Reform UK | John Tennant | 528 | 22.5 | |
| Turnout | | | | |

=== Victoria ===
Victoria (3 seats)
| Party | Candidate | Votes | % | ±% |
|---|---|---|---|---|
| Labour | Helen Howson | 805 | 38.3 | |
| Conservative | Dennis Loynes | 787 | 37.5 | |
| Labour | Carl Richardson | 780 | 37.1 | |
| Labour | Karen Oliver | 754 | 35.9 | |
| Independent | Rachael Budd | 323 | 15.4 | |
| Independent | Tony Mann | 270 | 12.9 | |
| IU | Ian Griffiths | 215 | 10.2 | |
| Independent | Steve Robinson | 208 | 9.9 | |
| VPP | Amanda Elizabeth Napper | 200 | 9.5 | |
| Heritage | Claire Martin | 133 | 6.3 | |
| Socialist Labour | David Sharpe | 68 | 3.2 | |
| Turnout | | | | |
