= 2010 Hartlepool Borough Council election =

2010 English local government election

Map of the 2010 Hartlepool Borough Council election

The 2010 Hartlepool Borough Council election took place on 7 May 2010 to elect a third of the members of Hartlepool Borough Council, the council of the Borough of Hartlepool in England. This was on the same day as the other local elections as well as the 2010 United Kingdom general election. The previous council election took place in 2008 and the following election was held in 2011. In the election, the Labour Party gained the council from no overall control.

== Results ==
Party	Previous	Seats +/-	2010
Labour	21	▲3	24
Liberal Democrat	5	Steady	5
Conservative	5	▼1	4
UKIP	2	▼1	1
Others	14	▼1	13

== See also ==
- Hartlepool Borough Council elections
