= Hartlepool Sixth Form College =

Location
- Blakelock Road; Brinkburn, Hartlepool, TS25 5PF; England; 54.67686°N 1.22935°W

Information
- Type: Sixth form college
- Local authority: Hartlepool
- Department for Education URN: 130568 Tables
- Ofsted: Reports
- Principal: Mr Mark Hughes
- Gender: Co-educational
- Age: 16 to 19
- Website: https://hartlepoolsixth.ac.uk/

Hartlepool Sixth Form College, otherwise known as 'HSFC', is one of fewer than 100 specialist sixth form colleges (for ages 16–19) in England.

== History ==
It was originally known as West Hartlepool Grammar School (also known as Brinkburn Grammar School) from 1902. The Girls' High School opened on Eldon Grove in 1912, and the school became a boys' school. It then became the Upper School of Brinkburn Comprehensive School in 1973. Created as the federal sixth form for the town's schools, it has established strong links with Hartlepool's four 11–16 secondary schools. The College's campus is based around a fully restored Merchant's House which dates from the 19th century.

== Rebuild ==
=== First phase ===
The College completed the first phase of a £24.5 million new build which will be attached to the Merchant's House by means of an atrium. The atrium leads off to a new theatre and performing arts facility; media studies and film studies rooms including a TV studio; new art studios and photography suite; new student common room; bistro cafeteria; music studio and practice rooms; music technology and recording studio and purpose-built teaching rooms for the humanities and social science subjects.

=== Second phase ===
The second phase of the build was completed in the summer of 2010 and includes science and maths classrooms; childcare and health and social care classrooms; ICT classrooms; PE and Sports Science facilities including a county class Sports Hall and fitness suite.

== Courses ==
Hartlepool Sixth Form College has the widest choice of academic and vocational courses at level 3 (A level, AS level and BTEC) in the area. All courses give students at the college appropriate pathways to help prepare effectively for university, employment or apprenticeships. The college has introduced additional opportunities to support student learning including the Careers Academy and Honours Programme.

== Partnership ==
The College has a partnership with the University of Sunderland and offers a two-year Foundation Degree in Law course. At the end of the course students can progress onto the third year of a qualifying degree. Hartlepool Sixth Form College also works closely with the Chartered Institute of Legal Executives (CILEx) offering both their Level 3 and Level 6 qualifications on a part-time basis.

== Sports ==
Hartlepool Sixth Form College has academies in football, netball and rugby. The college netball team plays in the National Super League and academy players benefit from a close partnership with Oaksway Netball Club. The HSFC RFU-affiliated Rugby Academy has enjoyed successes against professional clubs, youth academies and teams from specialist sports colleges.

The college represents the North East Region every year at the college sport National Championships event in Bath, which takes place in spring.

== Alumni ==
=== West Hartlepool Grammar School ===
- Ron Emerson CBE, founding Chairman of the British Business Bank
- Rear-Adm Derek O'Hara CB
- David Reed, Labour MP for Sedgefield from 1970–4
- Jack Rowell OBE, chief executive of Golden Wonder from 1988–92 and coach of the England rugby team from 1995–7
- Air Vice-Marshal James Spottiswood CB CVO AFC, chairman of the British Gliding Association from 1989–97
- Jeff Stelling, Sky Sports Soccer Saturday presenter
- Prof Thomas Westoll, Professor of Geology at Newcastle University from 1948–77 and president of the Palaeontological Association from 1966–8

=== Hartlepool Sixth Form College ===
- Stuart Drummond, former mayor of Hartlepool
- Lindsay Johnson, footballer who played for the England women's national football team
- Adam Radwan, England international rugby union winger

== See also ==
- Hartlepool College of Further Education, on Stockton Street in the town centre
- West Hartlepool R.F.C.
