= Ken Hodcroft =

British businessman

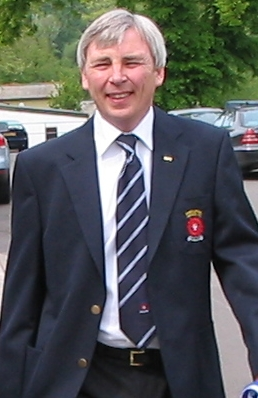
- Hodcroft at the League One play-offs, Cardiff, 2005
- Born: Ken Hodcroft; 1953 (age 72–73); Newcastle upon Tyne, England
- Education: Newcastle University; Imperial College London
- Occupation: Businessman
- Known for: former chairman of Hartlepool United
- Spouse: Divorced
- Children: 3

Ken Hodcroft (born 1953) is a British businessman, and the managing director of Increased Oil Recovery (IOR). IOR owned Hartlepool United for 18 years and Hodcroft was the chairman, before selling the football club to JPNG in 2015.

== Early life ==
Ken Hodcroft was born in Newcastle upon Tyne, the son of a marine engineer. He moved to Leeds when he was five with his family. There he was educated at Leeds Grammar School and took his A-Levels. It was at Leeds Grammar that his passion for both football and rugby grew. During his time there, he also gained an O level maths a year early, did additional maths (Oxbridge), and the following year acquired chemistry, physics and biology A-Levels. Hodcroft considered becoming a doctor but was put off by the 5-year course. Thus, he returned to Newcastle to study and gain a 2.1 Honours degree in chemical engineering at the University of Newcastle instead. He then went to Imperial College London, to study for an Msc in Petroleum Engineering. He had been influenced to study Petroleum Engineering and to work in the oil business after watching The Troubleshooters, a 1970s television programme about the oil industry.

== Business career ==
After university, Hodcroft moved to the US for two years and worked for the oil company Phillips Petroleum in Louisiana, Texas, and Bartlesville, Oklahoma. While at Bartlesville he played football for Tulsa Roughnecks and was offered a contract there. However, he rejected it in favour of a career in the oil business.

Shortly afterwards, Hodcroft moved to Norway to continue working for Phillips Petroleum. After 7 years he moved to Aberdeen, Scotland. It was there where he decided to form the oil company IOR after seeing a gap in the market. IOR was based in Aberdeen and is still successfully running today.

== Hartlepool United F.C. ==
1997, Hodcroft then moved back into football when IOR bought Hartlepool United from Harold Hornsey. Hodcroft then took over as chairman. During Hodcroft's early reign as chairman he appointed four managers: Chris Turner in 1999, Mike Newell in 2002, Neale Cooper in 2003 and Martin Scott in 2005. In 2005 after the departure of Neale Cooper, Hodcroft was heavily criticised by the fans of Hartlepool for having a “lack of ambition”. However, Hodcroft responded issuing a statement stating that IOR were fully committed to the club. His fifth manager, Danny Wilson, was appointed in 2006 and left in December 2008. Chris Turner, then Hartlepool's Director of Sport, was appointed temporary manager before accepting the job again on a permanent basis.

Next, Turner's coach Mick Wadsworth took over manager's duties following Turner's resignation. Neale Cooper then returned for a season, before being replaced by John Hughes (with coach Micky Barron taking caretaker charge again for a while in between). Hughes lasted less than a season at Victoria Park, losing his job after the team was relegated to League Two at the end of the 2012–13 season. This was despite the fact that Hughes oversaw an upturn in the team's fortunes but was unable to save them from the drop. He was sacked despite stating he wanted to remain to try to bring the club back up.

Next came Colin Cooper, appointed after Hughes' dismissal, but the former Middlesbrough defender resigned early in his second season at the club. His successor was former midfielder Paul Murray, however, after failing to turn around the club's fortunes, he was axed soon after. Hodcroft appointed escapist manager Ronnie Moore in December 2014 with the club adrift, rock bottom of League 2 following his previous job at Tranmere ending in controversy due to a gambling situation. Ronnie managed to serve a miraculous tenure and ensured their impressive continued existence in the Football League did not end.

Hodcroft has also had outspoken views regarding football agents and has refused to co-operate with agents, "if you want to work for us then don't send your agents." Hodcroft also pursued a feud with Michael Nelson's agent following his demands for a more lucrative contract and stated that the club will not be held to ransom, "If individual players or their agents do not like the way we do business then they will either have to adapt or find a club that is willing to succumb to their demands."

After taking the club over, Ken Hodcroft and IOR made substantial losses. At the club's AGM meeting Hodcroft reported a loss of £184,000 for the financial year of 2005. Despite making a loss it was a major improvement on the loss of around £500,000 in 2004 and 2003 and a loss of £900,000 for the year of 2002. Hodcroft has also revealed that IOR have provided Hartlepool with over £7.0 million of funding. Ken Hodcroft also funded the £500 fee for mascot H'Angus the Monkey, otherwise known as Stuart Drummond, to run for mayor. Consequently, the club made few monetary transfers, taking on mostly loan players and free agents. Money made from the sales of Jack Baldwin and Luke James to Peterborough United was not re-invested in players' transfer fees.

The club celebrated its centenary in 2008 and 10 years of IOR ownership in September 2007. The club has had its most successful time in those ten years reaching play off after playoff and a playoff final at Cardiff where the club was 8 minutes from winning and being promoted to the championship.

The same day that Moore's appointment was announced, news also broke in the Hartlepool Mail that the club had been sold by IOR to a company named TMH 2014 Ltd, which would lead Peter Harris to become chairman, with Ken Hodcroft leaving his post and the club's board of directors. This was conveniently announced the day after the closure of the transfer window thus yet again giving Hodcroft a cast-iron excuse for not spending.

However, even after the club quoted Harris as chairman in statements to supporters on their official website (for example to clarify that striker Ched Evans would not be signing for the club), the BBC reported on 5 February 2015 that the deal to change ownership had fallen through, insinuating that it was IOR "calling off" the deal and not the new company failing the Football League's club ownership safeguards that was at fault.

Following the TMH deal falling through, Hodcroft eventually sold the club to a little known recruitment firm JPNG handing over his position as chairman to former bankruptee, Gary Coxall. In the process, Hodcroft agreed to write off all debts owed by Hartlepool United which were outstanding through IORs ownership. JPNG owned the club until 2018 until a consortium of Sky Sports presenter and fan Jeff Stelling and local businessman Raj Singh took over.

Hodcroft rarely courted the limelight whilst with Pools, save for a few outspoken programme columns and interviews with the local newspaper. Hodcroft had a long working relationship with Chief Executive Russ Green at the club. Hodcroft had an up-and-down relationship with the club's supporters during his time at the helm, with the club the subject of a number of other takeover rumours prior to 2014.

== Politics ==
In 2019 Hodcroft was announced as the Brexit Party candidate for the constituency of Hartlepool. He later stood down due to business commitments. He was replaced by Richard Tice, the Brexit Party chairman.

== Personal life ==
He was married, but they separated when the children were young, and have two daughters and one son.
