= 2008 Hartlepool Borough Council election =

2008 English local government election

Map of the 2008 Hartlepool Borough Council election

The 2008 Hartlepool Borough Council election took place on 1 May 2008 to elect 15 councillors (a third) of the members of Hartlepool Borough Council, the council of the Borough of Hartlepool in England. This was on the same day as the other 2008 United Kingdom local elections. The previous council election took place in 2007 and the following election was held in 2010. In the election, the Labour Party lost the council to no overall control.

== Results ==
| Party | Previous | Seats +/- | 2008 |
|---|---|---|---|
| Labour | 24 | ▼1 | 23 |
| Liberal Democrat | 7 | ▲1 | 6 |
| Conservative | 4 | Steady | 5 |
| UKIP | 1 | ▼1 | 2 |
| Others | 11 | Steady | 11 |

== See also ==
- Hartlepool Borough Council elections
