= Directly elected local authority mayors =

English local authority leaders

Directly elected local authority mayors are the leaders of the small number of the local authorities in England that have adopted mayor-and-cabinet executive arrangements. Elsewhere, council leaders who form the executive of local authorities are typically selected by indirect election from amongst councillors. The innovation of direct election of a council mayor was introduced by the Local Government Act 2000 and withdrawn by the English Devolution and Community Empowerment Act 2026.

The powers of directly elected local authority mayors are not equal and depend on the type of local authority they lead. As of 2026, there are thirteen directly elected local authority mayoralties and six former mayoralties in England.

Since 2026, no further mayoralties will be created and their number is expected to reduce in upcoming local government changes. Creating or removing a mayoralty could be done by referendum, and the 2012 English mayoral referendums were an unsuccessful attempt to reinvigorate urban governance by adopting the model. There was one unsuccessful referendum to create a mayoralty for a Welsh council and none were created.

== History ==
The system of elected mayors had been considered by the Major ministry in the 1990s, and the former Environment Secretary Michael Heseltine had been a proponent of it. The 1997 Labour manifesto included a commitment to reform local government in London by introducing an elected mayor.

=== Introduction ===
In England and Wales outside London, since the Local Government Act 2000, there have been a range of options for how a local council executive leadership can be constituted, and installing a directly-elected mayor is one of these options. The 2000 act ended the previous committee-based system, where functions were exercised by committees of the council (although this was reinstated in 2012). All the several hundred principal councils were required to review their executive arrangements under the 2000 legislation. Local authorities considering the option of an elected mayor were required to put the question to a local referendum. It is also possible for campaign groups to trigger a local referendum with a signed petition. A number of areas with elected mayors also have civic mayors or Lord mayors; these ceremonial roles conferred on acting councillors are separate from elected mayors.

From 2000 until 2022 all directly-elected mayors in England were elected using the supplementary vote electoral system. Following the passing of the Elections Act 2022, the 2023, 2024, and 2025 elections were run using first past the post. A change back to the supplementary vote is implemented by the English Devolution and Community Empowerment Act 2026.

=== Adoption ===
Eleven mayors were established during 2002, in both metropolitan and non-metropolitan districts, unitary authorities and London boroughs. Three further mayoralties were created under this legislation: in 2005 (Torbay; abolished 2019), 2010 (Tower Hamlets), and 2015 (Copeland; abolished 2023). Some of the first mayoral elections were won by independents, notably in Hartlepool, where the election was won by Stuart Drummond, who played Hartlepool United's mascot; and in Middlesbrough, where it was won by former police officer Ray Mallon, who left the local police force to stand for election.

Although Wales is included in the legislation, only one Welsh authority, Ceredigion, has held a referendum on such a proposal, in May 2004. Over 70% of the voters taking part voted against the proposal.

=== Legislative changes ===
In October 2006 the DCLG white paper Strong and Prosperous Communities proposed that in future the requirement for a referendum to approve the establishment of an elected mayor for a council area be dropped in favour of a simple resolution of the council following community consultation. It also proposed the direct election of council cabinets where requested, and that the unique "mayor and council manager" system in Stoke-on-Trent be replaced by a conventional "mayor and cabinet" system. The "mayor and council manager" option was later eliminated by the Local Government and Public Involvement in Health Act 2007 and a referendum on a directly elected mayoralty was no longer required if two thirds of a council voted in favour of the change. The elected cabinet option was not taken forward. The 2007 legislation required all local authorities to review their executive arrangements again and consider the case for an elected mayor.

=== Further changes ===
In February 2006 the Institute for Public Policy Research published a report calling for elected mayors in Birmingham and Manchester, which was positively received by the government, but not by the two city councils concerned. Later Prime Minister David Cameron expressed support for the system, saying that directly elected mayors are "accountable" and can "galvanise action". On 2 May 2012 the Bow Group, a Conservative think tank, published a short article supporting directly elected mayors for large English cities.

The Localism Act 2011 permitted central government to trigger referendums for elected mayors, and this was intended to happen in the largest cities during 2012. Ahead of this, Leicester City Council in 2011 and Liverpool City Council in 2012 exercised their option to have a directly elected mayor without a referendum. In September 2011 citizens of Salford collected the required number of signatures to force a referendum, which was successful. The first mayoral election took place in May 2012.

Using the powers in the Localism Act 2011, referendums were held on 3 May 2012 in ten English cities to decide whether or not to switch to a system that included a directly elected mayor. Only one, Bristol, voted in favour of a mayoral system. Doncaster voted to retain its elected mayoral system in a referendum held on the same day.

=== Elected county leaders ===
Devolution deals had been agreed in principle with Norfolk and Suffolk by the Conservative government which involve directly-elected leaders of each county's council. Norfolk County Council voted to accept the deal. In May 2024, Suffolk County Council was seeking consultation. In September, the new Labour government decided to not proceed with single-authority devolution deals, instead preferring multi-authority deals involving the formation of strategic authorities. The mayoral agreements for Norfolk and Suffolk agreed by the previous government will therefore not proceed.

== Removing the post of mayor ==
Executive arrangement reviews, petitions and local referendums in the Local Government Act 2000 can also be used to remove the post of mayor and revert to the typical "leader and cabinet" executive arrangement. Such methods could not initially be used to remove the post of mayor if it was established following a Government-mandated referendum. However, a House of Lords amendment to the Cities and Local Government Devolution Act 2016 amended the Local Government Act 2000 to establish the right of a future referendum to abolish any local authority elected mayor established following a Government-mandated referendum.

Councillors have complained about the perceived excessive power of directly elected mayors. There have been campaigns in four of the local authorities with directly elected mayors to hold referendums to abolish the posts. In April 2007, Lewisham Council voted 28–24 against a motion calling for consultation over the issue.

In Doncaster, in March 2007, "Fair Deal" campaigners presented an 11,000-signature petition to the council calling for a new referendum. The council voted 31–27 in favour of a new referendum, which was held in May 2012. The electorate voted in favour of retaining the mayoralty. The Middlesbrough electorate also voted to retain the mayoral system.

Three councils have reverted to leader and cabinet executives. The electorate of Stoke-on-Trent voted to remove the post of elected mayor on 23 October 2008, to be replaced with a system of council leader and cabinet. In November 2012 Hartlepool also voted to scrap the position of directly elected mayor in a referendum. Liverpool City Council chose to abolish the post of elected mayor and revert to a leader and cabinet model from May 2023 following a 2022 consultation on its future governance. Referendums were held in North Tyneside and Torbay in May 2016 to determine the future of their mayoralties. While North Tyneside voted to retain the system, Torbay voted in favour of returning to a leader and cabinet style of governance. Further referendums were held in May 2021 in Newham and Tower Hamlets, which both voted to retain the mayoral system. Bristol voted to remove the post of elected mayor in a referendum on 5 May 2022, to be replaced with a committee system.

== Scotland and Northern Ireland ==
The Local Government Act 2000 does not apply in Scotland and the Scottish Parliament has chosen to reform local government instead by introducing the Single Transferable Vote electoral system. The Scottish Conservatives support elected mayors where there is found to be "local demand in our major towns and cities". The head of a local government in Scotland is traditionally known as a provost.

There are no directly elected mayors in Northern Ireland. Offices of mayors in Northern Ireland are only a ceremonial position.

== Powers ==
The powers of the mayor are commensurate with the kind of local authority for which they are the executive. London borough councils, metropolitan district councils and unitary authority councils have broadly similar functions, but for non-metropolitan district councils it is a subset, for example not having power over education, libraries and waste management. The Mayor of London has completely different powers to the "mayor and cabinet" leaders.

A local-authority elected mayor has powers similar to those of the executive committee in a Leader and Cabinet model local authority. These are described as either "exclusive" powers or "co-decision" powers and are defined in the Local Government (Functions and Responsibilities) (England) Regulations 2000.

Co-decision powers are those the mayor shares with the council, notably the power to make the local authority's annual budget and its policy framework documents. These are: Annual Library Plan; Best Value Performance Plan; Children's Services Plan; Community Care Plan; Community Strategy; Crime and Disorder Reduction Strategy; Early Years Development Plan; Education Development Plan; Local Development Framework; and the Youth Justice Plan. To amend or reject a mayor's proposals for any of these documents, the council must resolve to do so by a two-thirds majority. This is again based on secondary legislation, in this case the Local Government (Standing Orders) (England) Regulations 2001.

Exclusive powers are less easy to define, because they consist of all the powers that are granted to a local authority by Act of Parliament except those defined either as co-decision powers or as "not to be the responsibility of an authority's executive". This latter is a limited list, including quasi-judicial decisions on planning and licensing, and certain ceremonial, employment and legal decisions.

An elected mayor (in a mayor and cabinet system) also has the power to appoint up to nine councillors as members of a cabinet and to delegate powers, either to them as individuals, or to the Mayor and Cabinet committee, or to subcommittees of the Mayor and Cabinet committee. In practice, the mayor remains personally accountable, so most mayors have chosen to delegate to a very limited extent—if at all.

Local authorities in Britain remain administered by a permanent staff of chief officers led by a chief executive or chief operating officer who are politically neutral bureaucrats. Their powers remain unaffected by the introduction of elected mayor. Senior officers continue to be appointed by a politically representative committee of councillors, and the mayor may not attempt to influence the decision as to who is appointed (except within the committee as a member of the committee). To maintain the staff's professional and political independence, the mayor (or any other member of the council) may not personally direct any member of staff. Accordingly, an elected mayor cannot really be accurately characterised as an executive mayor, as in parts of the US and certain other countries, but more as a semi-executive mayor.

Consultations took place in 12 English cities due to have referendums over the introduction of elected mayors, over what powers those mayors should have, and how they should be scrutinised.

== Referendum results ==
As of October 2021, there have been 54 referendums on the question of changing executive arrangements to a model with an elected mayor. Referendums are triggered by council resolution, local petition or central government intervention. Of these, 17 have resulted in the establishment of a new mayoralty and 37 have been rejected by voters. Average "yes" vote is 45%. Typical turnout is around 30%, but has been as low as 10% and as high as 64%. The turnout is higher when the referendum coincides with another vote, such as an election.

There have been nine referendums on the question of removing the post of elected mayor. Four mayoral posts have been disestablished following a vote and five retained.

Two local authority mayors, those for Leicester and Liverpool, were created by city council resolution without holding a referendum.

== List of mayoralties ==
=== Current ===
Post	Current mayor	Party	Local authority	Type	Established	Next election	Population
Mayor of Bedford	Tom Wootton	Conservative	Bedford	Unitary authority, non-metropolitan district	2002	2027	155,700
Mayor of Croydon	Jason Perry	Conservative	Croydon	London borough	2022	2030	386,710
Mayor of Doncaster	Ros Jones	Labour	Doncaster	Metropolitan borough	2002	2029	291,600
Mayor of Hackney	Zoë Garbett	Green	Hackney	London borough	2002	2030	212,200
Mayor of Leicester	Peter Soulsby	Labour	Leicester	Unitary authority, non-metropolitan district	2011	2027	294,700
Mayor of Lewisham	Liam Shrivastava	Green	Lewisham	London borough	2002	2030	261,600
Mayor of Mansfield	Andy Abrahams	Labour	Mansfield	Two-tier district, non-metropolitan district	2002	2027	100,600
Mayor of Middlesbrough	Chris Cooke	Labour Co-op	Middlesbrough	Unitary authority, non-metropolitan district	2002	2027	139,000
Mayor of Newham	Forhad Hussain	Labour	Newham	London borough	2002	2030	249,500
Mayor of North Tyneside	Karen Clark	Labour	North Tyneside	Metropolitan borough	2002	2029	196,000
Mayor of Salford	Paul Dennett	Labour	Salford	Metropolitan borough	2012	2028	229,000
Mayor of Tower Hamlets	Lutfur Rahman	Aspire	Tower Hamlets	London borough	2010	2030	220,500
Mayor of Watford	Peter Taylor	Liberal Democrats	Watford	Two-tier district, non-metropolitan district	2002	2030	80,000

=== Former ===
Former mayoralties are:

Local authority	Post	Type	Established	Disestablished
Bristol City Council	Mayor of Bristol	Unitary authority, non-metropolitan district	2012	2024
Copeland Borough Council	Mayor of Copeland	Two-tier district, non-metropolitan district	2015	2023
Hartlepool Borough Council	Mayor of Hartlepool	Unitary authority, non-metropolitan district	2002	2013
Liverpool City Council	Mayor of Liverpool	Metropolitan borough	2012	2023
Stoke-on-Trent City Council	Mayor of Stoke-on-Trent	Unitary authority, non-metropolitan district	2002	2009
Torbay Council	Mayor of Torbay	Unitary authority, non-metropolitan district	2005	2019

=== Cancelled proposals ===
Authority	Post	Type	Cancellation
Cornwall Council	Mayor of Cornwall	Mayoral Deal in Cornwall, which changes the Governance model of Cornwall Council from a Leader and Cabinet to a Mayor and Cabinet	Cancelled April 2023
Norfolk County Council	Elected Leader of Norfolk County Council	County Deal in Norfolk, with an Elected Leader and not Mayor	Cancelled September 2024
Suffolk County Council	Elected Leader of Suffolk County Council	County Deal in Suffolk, with an Elected Leader and not Mayor	Cancelled September 2024

== See also ==
- Strategic authority mayor
