= 2002 Hartlepool Borough Council election =

2002 UK local government election

Elections to Hartlepool Borough Council in the ceremonial county of County Durham in England were held on 2 May 2002. One third of the council was up for election and the council stayed under no overall control. At the same time an election took place for a directly elected mayor, which was won by independent candidate Stuart Drummond.

== Mayoral election ==
=== Campaign ===
Five candidates stood in the election for mayor, one each from the three main political parties and two independents. The Labour candidate for mayor was Leo Gillen, a local businessman who had led the campaign in favour of introducing a directly elected mayor. The Liberal Democrats selected the leader of the council since 2000, Arthur Preece, as their candidate for mayor, while the Conservatives chose councillor Stephen Close. The first independent candidate, Stuart Drummond, was better known as H'Angus the Monkey the official mascot for the local football team Hartlepool United F.C. The other independent candidate was Ian Cameron, another local businessman.

Drummond campaigned on a pledge to give free bananas to all school pupils under 11 in Hartlepool. He received backing from the football club who paid his deposit and he promised that he would attempt to keep a local sports centre open, improve sporting facilities, tackle crime and reduce the number of councillors. His candidacy began as something of a joke but became more serious as he attracted support during the campaign.

A supplementary voting system was used in the mayoral election with second preferences being used if no candidate received over half of the vote. A local bookmaker initially made Drummond a 100–1 outsider in the mayoral election but soon had to suspend betting after receiving a lot of bets from local people.

=== Results ===
Stuart Drummond won the mayoral election defeating the Labour candidate Leo Gillen on second preferences. Drummond said that his victory was due to disillusionment with local politicians and said that he was serious about doing a good job for Hartlepool as mayor. Local Member of Parliament Peter Mandelson praised Drummond on his victory and described him as being "very committed". However other political opponents described the results as having made Hartlepool "a laughing stock".

Hartlepool Mayoral Election 2 May 2002
Party	Candidate	1st round		2nd round			1st round votesTransfer votes, 2nd round
Party	Candidate	Total	Of round	Transfers	Total	Of round	1st round votesTransfer votes, 2nd round
Independent	Stuart Drummond	5,696	29.1%	1,699	7,395	52.2%	
Labour	Leo Gillen	5,438	27.8%	1,324	6,762	47.8%	
Independent	Ian Cameron	5,174	26.5%				
Liberal Democrats	Arthur Preece	1,675	8.6%				
Conservative	Stephen Close	1,561	8.0%				
Independent win							

== Council election ==
In the previous election in 2000 the Labour Party had lost control of the council which since then had been run by a coalition between the Liberal Democrats and Conservatives. Elections took place in 16 of the 17 wards with only Greatham ward not holding an election. Most attention was on the mayoral election but there was a large swing of 14.2% to Labour in the council election. However they were only able to gain one seat in Seaton ward from the Conservatives.

After the election, the composition of the council was:

- Labour 23
- Liberal Democrat 12
- Conservative 8
- Independent 4

=== Results ===
Hartlepool local election result 2002
Party	Seats	Gains	Losses	Net gain/loss	Seats %	Votes %	Votes	+/−
Labour	9			+1	56.3	49.4	9,550	
Liberal Democrats	3			-1	18.8	24.7	4,768	
Conservative	2			-1	12.5	18.3	3,529	
Independent	2			+1	12.5	4.8	934	
UKIP	0			0	0.0	2.8	540	

=== Ward results ===
Brinkburn
Party	Candidate	Votes	%	±%
Liberal Democrats	John Lauderdale	698	61.5	
Labour	Alison Lilley	437	38.5	
Majority		262	23.0	
Turnout		1,135		

Brus
Party	Candidate	Votes	%	±%
Labour	Denis Waller	559	62.9	
Conservative	Christopher McKenna	205	23.1	
Independent	Mary Power	125	14.1	
Majority		354	39.8	
Turnout		889		

Dyke House
Party	Candidate	Votes	%	±%
Labour	Sandra Fenwick	640	68.8	
Liberal Democrats	Lynn Thompson	290	31.2	
Majority		350	37.6	
Turnout		930		

Elwick
Party	Candidate	Votes	%	±%
Independent	Stan Kaiser	288	48.1	
Conservative	Hilary Thompson	214	35.7	
Labour	Ron Watts	97	16.2	
Majority		74	12.4	
Turnout		599		

Fens
Party	Candidate	Votes	%	±%
Liberal Democrats	Patricia Rayner	865	62.1	
Labour	George English	527	37.9	
Majority		338	24.2	
Turnout		1,392		

Grange
Party	Candidate	Votes	%	±%
Conservative	Douglas Ferriday	911	58.0	
Labour	Alan Walker	661	42.0	
Majority		250	16.0	
Turnout		1,572		

Hart
Party	Candidate	Votes	%	±%
Liberal Democrats	Thomas Burey	762	57.9	
Labour	Alice Savage	555	42.1	
Majority		207	15.8	
Turnout		1,317		

Jackson
Party	Candidate	Votes	%	±%
Labour	Carl Richardson	683	70.8	
Liberal Democrats	Sheila Bruce	282	29.2	
Majority		401	41.6	
Turnout		965		

Owton
Party	Candidate	Votes	%	±%
Labour	Anthony Groom	504	70.1	
Liberal Democrats	Kenneth Fox	215	29.9	
Majority		289	40.2	
Turnout		719		

Park
Party	Candidate	Votes	%	±%
Conservative	George Morris	970	52.4	
Labour	Stephen Belcher	882	47.6	
Majority		88	4.8	
Turnout		1,852		

Rift House
Party	Candidate	Votes	%	±%
Labour	Iain Wright	725	50.3	
Liberal Democrats	Ronald Foreman	716	49.7	
Majority		9	0.6	
Turnout		1,441		

Rossmere
Party	Candidate	Votes	%	±%
Labour	Michael Johnson	777	67.0	
Liberal Democrats	Howard Smith	286	24.7	
UKIP	David Pascoe	97	8.4	
Majority		491	42.3	
Turnout		1,160		

St Hilda
Party	Candidate	Votes	%	±%
Independent	Stephen Allison	521	38.1	
Labour	Patrick Price	484	35.4	
Liberal Democrats	Kevin Kelly	364	26.6	
Majority		37	2.7	
Turnout		1,369		

Seaton
Party	Candidate	Votes	%	±%
Labour	Michael Turner	778	52.5	
Conservative	David Young	704	47.5	
Majority		74	5.0	
Turnout		1,482		
Labour gain from Conservative		Swing		

Stranton
Party	Candidate	Votes	%	±%
Labour	Mary Fleet	415	58.9	
Liberal Democrats	Peter Whitham	290	41.1	
Majority		225	17.8	
Turnout		705		

Throston
Party	Candidate	Votes	%	±%
Labour	Stephen Wallace	826	46.0	
Conservative	Robert Addison	525	29.3	
UKIP	Eric Wilson	443	24.7	
Majority		301	16.7	
Turnout		1,794		
