= 2024 Hartlepool Borough Council election =

Local election in Hartlepool, England

- 2 May 2024

12 out of 36 seats to Hartlepool Borough Council 19 seats needed for a majority
- Turnout: 28%

	Majority party	Minority party
Leader	Brenda Harrison	Mike Young
Party	Labour	Conservative
Leader's seat	De Bruce	Rural West
Seats before	17	12
Seats after	24	6
Seat change	▲7	▼6
	Third party	Fourth party
Party	Independent	IU
Seats before	6	1
Seats after	5	1
Seat change	▼1	Steady
- Winner of each seat at the 2024 Hartlepool Borough Council election
Leader before election
Mike Young
Conservative
No overall control
Leader after election
Brenda Harrison
Labour

The 2024 Hartlepool Borough Council election was held on Thursday 2 May 2024, alongside the other local elections in the United Kingdom being held on the same day. One-third of the 36 members of Hartlepool Borough Council in County Durham were elected.

Prior to the election the council was under no overall control, being run by a Conservative and independent coalition. Following the election, Labour won an overall majority on the council.

== Background ==
In the previous 2023 election, Labour won 9 seats (up 5) with 44.6% of the vote, the Conservatives won 2 (down 1) with 22.6%, independents won 1 (down 3) with 20.6%, and the Independent Union lost the seat they were defending with 3.1%. Following the 2023 election, the Conservatives, the Independent Union, and 5 independents formed a minority coalition.

== Previous council composition ==
After 2023 election		Before 2024 election		After 2024 election	
Party	Seats	Party	Seats	Party	Seats
Labour	18	Labour	17	Labour	24
Conservative	12	Conservative	12	Conservative	6
IU	1	IU	1	IU	1
Independent	5	Independent	6	Independent	5

Changes 2023–2024:

- July 2023: Steve Wallace leaves Labour to sit as an independent

== Summary ==
Labour gained seven seats, mostly at the expense of the Conservatives, giving Labour an overall majority on the council. Labour's group leader, Brenda Harrison, was formally appointed as leader of the council at the subsequent annual council meeting on 21 May 2024.

=== Election result ===
2024 Hartlepool Borough Council election
Party	This election			Full council			This election		
Party	Seats	Net	Seats %	Other	Total	Total %	Votes	Votes %	+/−
Labour	9	▲7	75.0	15	24	66.7	9,274	46.5	+2.4
Conservative	1	▼6	8.3	5	6	16.7	4,911	24.6	+2.3
Independent	2	▼1	16.7	3	5	13.9	2,688	13.5	–7.0
IU	0	Steady	0.0	1	1	2.8	N/A	N/A	–3.1
Reform	0	Steady	0.0	0	0	0.0	2,847	14.3	+6.9

== Results by ward ==
=== Burn Valley ===
Burn Valley
Party	Candidate	Votes	%	±%
Labour Co-op	Corinne Male	919	54.5	−6.3
Conservative	David Nicholson*	339	20.1	+1.7
Reform	Graham Harrison	270	16.0	+8.7
Independent	John Hays	158	9.4	−4.0
Majority		580	34.4	
Turnout				
Labour Co-op gain from Conservative				

=== De Bruce ===
De Bruce
Party	Candidate	Votes	%	±%
Labour Co-op	Michael Jorgeson	758	54.8	−9.0
Conservative	Ian Glass	330	23.9	+7.7
Reform	Trevor Rogan	294	21.3	+1.4
Majority		428	31.0	
Turnout				
Labour Co-op gain from Conservative				

=== Fens and Greatham ===
Fens and Greatham
Party	Candidate	Votes	%	±%
Independent	Jim Lindridge*	723	34.8	N/A
Labour Co-op	Owen Riddle	622	29.9	−11.8
Conservative	Marc Owens	310	14.9	−10.1
Reform	Peter Tylee	262	12.6	+7.5
Independent	Tony Richardson	160	7.7	−4.1
Majority		101	4.9	
Turnout		2,077		
Independent hold				

=== Foggy Furze ===
Foggy Furze
Party	Candidate	Votes	%	±%
Labour Co-op	Carole Thompson*	927	58.0	+5.6
Conservative	Chris Groves	503	31.5	+4.1
Reform	Leah Stead	121	7.6	+0.2
Heritage	Vivienne Neville	46	2.9	N/A
Majority		424	26.5	
Turnout		1,597		
Labour Co-op gain from Independent				

=== Hart ===
Hart
Party	Candidate	Votes	%	±%
Labour Co-op	Aaron Roy	841	42.6	+11.2
Conservative	Tom Cassidy*	629	31.9	+0.3
Reform	Amanda Napper	244	12.4	N/A
Independent	Stuart Campbell	164	8.3	N/A
Independent	Pauline Phillips	95	4.8	−1.7
Majority		212	10.7	
Turnout		1,973		
Labour Co-op gain from Conservative				

=== Headland and Harbour ===
Headland and Harbour
Party	Candidate	Votes	%	±%
Labour Co-op	John Nelson	847	51.4	+10.6
Conservative	Brian Cowie*	333	20.2	+0.7
Reform	Drew Murley	222	13.5	N/A
Independent	Scott Gaiety	178	10.8	N/A
Independent	Rob Stevenson	68	4.1	N/A
Majority		514	31.2	
Turnout		1,648		
Labour Co-op gain from Conservative				

=== Manor House ===
Manor House
Party	Candidate	Votes	%	±%
Labour Co-op	Katherine Cook	625	57.4	−0.8
Reform	Stephen Wright	214	19.7	+6.0
Conservative	Margaret Lyall	160	14.7	−3.9
Independent	Bob Eagleton	64	5.9	N/A
Majority		411	37.7	
Turnout		1,088		
Labour Co-op gain from Conservative				

=== Rossmere ===
Rossmere
Party	Candidate	Votes	%	±%
Labour Co-op	Quewone Bailey-Fleet	649	54.4	+2.4
Conservative	Marley Haggan	275	23.1	N/A
Reform	Tracy Connolly	269	22.5	+10.8
Majority		374	31.3	
Turnout		1,193		
Labour Co-op gain from Conservative				

=== Rural West ===
Rural West
Party	Candidate	Votes	%	±%
Conservative	Scott Reeve*	1,197	48.1	+0.7
Labour Co-op	Malcolm Walker	833	33.5	+6.3
Reform	Angela Jackson	339	13.6	+10.0
Green	Stephen Ashfield	121	4.9	N/A
Majority		364	14.6	
Turnout		2,490		
Conservative hold				

=== Seaton ===
Seaton
Party	Candidate	Votes	%	±%
Independent	Sue Little*	1,078	58.9	+6.8
Labour Co-op	David Innes	359	19.6	+0.2
Conservative	Morgan Barker	221	12.1	−7.4
Reform	Paul Manley	137	7.5	−1.5
Green	Stuart Williams	36	2.0	N/A
Majority		719	39.3	
Turnout		1,831		
Independent hold				

=== Throston ===
Throston
Party	Candidate	Votes	%	±%
Labour Co-op	Martin Scarborough	1,015	62.5	+12.2
Conservative	Richie Hughes	347	21.4	N/A
Reform	Alec Gough	263	16.2	+5.3
Majority		668	41.1	
Turnout		1,625		
Labour Co-op gain from Independent				

=== Victoria ===
Victoria
Party	Candidate	Votes	%	±%
Labour Co-op	Christopher Wallace	879	64.7	+1.9
Conservative	Veronica Nicholson	267	19.7	−7.6
Reform	John Fleet	212	15.6	+5.7
Majority		612	45.0	
Turnout		1,358		
Labour Co-op hold				

== By-elections ==
=== Throston ===
Throston by-election: 11 July 2025
Party	Candidate	Votes	%	±%
Reform	Ed Doyle	595	48.7	+32.5
Labour	Mark Hanson	475	38.8	–23.7
Green	Tom Casey	62	5.1	N/A
Conservative	Margaret Lyall	59	4.8	–16.6
Liberal Democrats	Connor Stallard	32	2.6	N/A
Majority		120	9.9	N/A
Turnout		1,223	20.4	
Reform gain from Labour		Swing	▲28.1	
