= 2019 Hartlepool Borough Council election =

2019 UK local government election

Hartlepool Council Election 2019
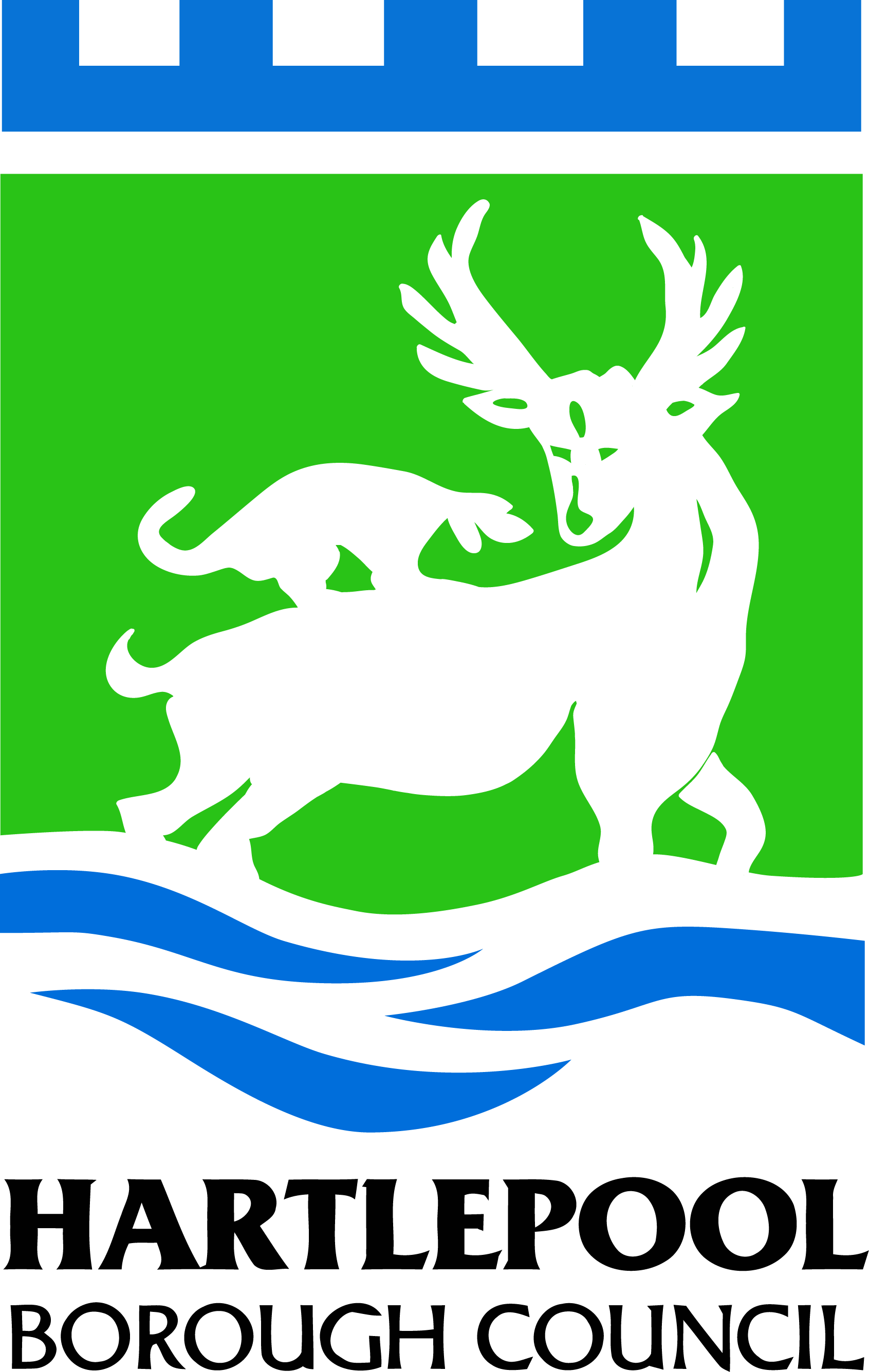
← 2018	2 May 2019	2021 →

11 Seats up for Election
	First party	Second party	Third party
Party	Labour	IU	Conservative
Seats before	19	0	3
Seats won	3	2	1
Seats after	17	2	4
Seat change	▼2	▲2	▲1
Popular vote	5,367	3,534	1,530
Percentage	28.1%	18.5%	8.0%

Map of the results

The 2019 Hartlepool Borough Council election took place on 2 May 2019 to elect members of Hartlepool Borough Council in England. This was on the same day as other local elections.

== Ward results ==
=== Burn Valley ===
Burn Valley
Party	Candidate	Votes	%	±%
Independent	Ged Hall	1,104	69.4	
Labour	Ann Johnson	487	30.6	
Majority				
Turnout				
Independent gain from Labour		Swing		

=== De Bruce ===
De Bruce
Party	Candidate	Votes	%	±%
For Britain	Karen King	694	49.5	
Labour	Rob Cook	527	37.6	
Conservative	Dave Nicholson	180	12.8	
Majority				
Turnout				
For Britain gain from Labour		Swing		

=== Fens & Rossmere ===
Fens & Rossmere
Party	Candidate	Votes	%	±%
Labour	Jim Lindridge	971	41.0	
IU	Peter Joyce	869	36.7	
Independent	Howard Smith	529	22.3	
Majority				
Turnout				
Labour hold		Swing		

=== Foggy Furze ===
Foggy Furze
Party	Candidate	Votes	%	±%
VPP	Lee Cartwright	544	30.7	
Labour	Kevin Cranney	425	24.0	
Independent	Joe Larkin	378	21.3	
Conservative	Den Loynes	177	10.0	
Green	Michael Ritchie	117	6.6	
Independent	Connor Stallard	91	5.1	
Independent	Andrew Wildberg	42	2.4	
Majority				
Turnout				
VPP gain from Labour		Swing		

=== Hart ===
Hart
Party	Candidate	Votes	%	±%
IU	James Brewer	1,325	67.2	
Labour	Aileen Kendon	647	32.8	
Majority				
Turnout				
IU gain from Labour		Swing		

=== Headland & Harbour ===
Headland & Harbour
Party	Candidate	Votes	%	±%
IU	Barbara Ward	510	35.9	
Labour	Ian Cawley	394	27.7	
Democrats and Veterans	Ian Griffiths	289	20.4	
Independent	Tommy Dudley	227	16.0	
Majority				
Turnout				
IU gain from Labour		Swing		

=== Jesmond ===
Jesmond
Party	Candidate	Votes	%	±%
Labour	Amy Prince	473	30.0	
IU	Linda Parker	445	28.2	
UKIP	Andrew Goy	382	24.2	
Independent	Richard Jackson	207	13.1	
Socialist Labour	Sandra Belcher	70	4.4	
Majority				
Turnout				
Labour hold		Swing		

=== Manor House ===
Manor House
Party	Candidate	Votes	%	±%
UKIP	David Mincher	726	47.6	
Labour	Ron Watts	438	28.7	
Socialist Labour	Allan Barclay	241	15.8	
Conservative	Andy Loynes	121	7.9	
Majority				
Turnout				
UKIP gain from Labour		Swing		

=== Rural West ===
Rural West
Party	Candidate	Votes	%	±%
Conservative	Cameron Stokell	878	43.9	
Independent	Christopher Sayer	683	34.2	
Labour	Katherine Cook	237	11.9	
Liberal Democrats	Nikki Fothergill	201	10.1	
Majority				
Turnout				
Conservative hold		Swing		

=== Seaton ===
Seaton
Party	Candidate	Votes	%	±%
Independent	Leisa Smith	1,310	63.0	
UKIP	Graham Harrison	351	16.9	
Labour	Julie Clayton	244	11.7	
Conservative	Veronica Nicholson	174	8.4	
Majority				
Turnout				
Independent hold		Swing		

=== Victoria ===
Victoria
Party	Candidate	Votes	%	±%
Labour	Helen Howson	524	36.9	
IU	Trevor Rogan	385	27.1	
Liberal Democrats	Andy Hagon	262	18.5	
Independent	Richard Hughes	248	17.5	
Majority				
Turnout				
Labour hold		Swing		

== Changes 2019–2021 ==
On 9 May 2019, the former Labour council leader Christopher Akers-Belcher and two fellow party members defected to the Socialist Labour Party following the Labour Party's defeat in the recent local elections. On 13 September 2019, ten independent councillors joined the Brexit Party. The Conservative councillors then formed a pact with the Brexit Party councillors to become the largest group on the council.
