= Mayor of Hartlepool =

Municipal office in England (2002–2013)

- Appointer: Electorate of Hartlepool
- Precursor: Council Leader
- Formation: 2 May 2002
- First holder: Stuart Drummond
- Final holder: Stuart Drummond
- Abolished: 2 May 2013
- Succession: Council Leader

The Mayor of Hartlepool was the executive mayor of Hartlepool Borough Council in County Durham, England. Established in 2002 and abolished in 2013, all three terms of office were served by Stuart Drummond, who was first elected under the guise of H'Angus the Monkey, the town's football club's mascot.

The office was established in 2002 following a referendum the previous year in which governance by a directly elected mayor was favoured over a cabinet system. Another referendum in 2012 produced the converse result, and the office was abolished in May 2013.

Drummond was first elected in 2002 and was re-elected in 2005 and 2009. Drummond was the first mayor in Britain to win a third term.

== Referendums ==
Mayor of Hartlepool referendum 18 October 2001
Choice	Votes	%
Elected Mayor	10,667	50.89
Cabinet System	10,294	49.11
Required majority		50
Total	20,961	100.00
Registered voters/turnout		31
Source: The Guardian

Mayor of Hartlepool referendum 15 November 2012
Choice	Votes	%
Cabinet System	7,366	58.73
Elected Mayor	5,177	41.27
Required majority		50
Total	12,543	100.00
Registered voters/turnout		18
Source: BBC News

== Elections ==
Elections were held under the supplementary vote system.

=== 2002 ===
Hartlepool Mayoral Election 2 May 2002
Party	Candidate	1st round		2nd round			1st round votesTransfer votes, 2nd round
Party	Candidate	Total	Of round	Transfers	Total	Of round	1st round votesTransfer votes, 2nd round
Independent	Stuart Drummond	5,696	29.1%	1,699	7,395	52.2%	
Labour	Leo Gillen	5,438	27.8%	1,324	6,762	47.8%	
Independent	Ian Cameron	5,174	26.5%				
Liberal Democrats	Arthur Preece	1,675	8.6%				
Conservative	Stephen Close	1,561	8.0%				
Independent win							

=== 2005 ===
Hartlepool Mayoral Election 5 May 2005
Party	Candidate	1st round		2nd round			1st round votesTransfer votes, 2nd round
Party	Candidate	Total	Of round	Transfers	Total	Of round	1st round votesTransfer votes, 2nd round
Independent	Stuart Drummond	14,227	42.1%	2,685	16,912	71.6%	
Labour	Carl Richardson	5,527	16.4%	1,180	6,707	28.4%	
Independent	Ian Cameron	4,272	12.6%				
Hartlepool First	Stephen Allison	3,765	11.1%				
Independent	Stan Kaiser	2,701	8.0%				
Independent	John Lauderdale	1,821	5.4%				
Conservative	Brenda Pearson	1,482	4.4%				
Independent hold							

=== 2009 ===
Hartlepool Mayoral Election 4 June 2009
Party	Candidate	1st round		2nd round			1st round votesTransfer votes, 2nd round
Party	Candidate	Total	Of round	Transfers	Total	Of round	1st round votesTransfer votes, 2nd round
Independent	Stuart Drummond	5,268	24.5%	1,599	6,867	53.3%	
Independent	Ian Cameron	4,280	19.9%	1,743	6,023	46.7%	
Labour	Chris Simmons	2,921	13.6%				
UKIP	Martyn Aiken	1,844	8.6%				
Independent	Tony Morrell	1,457	6.8%				
BNP	Cheryl Dunn	1,352	6.3%				
Conservative	David Young	1,092	5.1%				
Independent	Jim Gillespie	986	4.6%				
Independent	Iris Ryder	594	2.8%				
Independent	Alison Willetts	564	2.6%				
Liberal Democrats	Lynne Gillam	464	2.2%				
Independent	Barbara Jackson	461	2.2%				
Independent	Christine Blakey	204	1.0%				
Independent hold							

== List of mayors ==
Political party	Name	Entered office	Left office
Independent	Stuart Drummond	2 May 2002	2 May 2013 (system abolition)
