= Mascot Grand National =

The Mascot Grand National was an annual race between mascots of various British sports teams as well as corporate mascots. It was contested from 1999 to 2010 at Huntingdon Racecourse and in 2012 and 2013 at Kempton Park Racecourse. Up to 100 mascots in full-body costumes took part in the races. The short races were along the final furlong of the courses, with low hurdles (approximately 40 cm high). The mascots' entry fees were donated to charity.

In 2010, many mascots, especially those from professional football clubs, boycotted the race over the way it was organised and the fact that mascots from any field could enter even if they were not 'day in-day out' performers.

== List of winners ==
- 1999: Beau Brummie Bulldog — Birmingham City F.C.
- 2000: Harry the Hornet — Watford F.C.
- 2001: Dazzler the Lion — Rushden & Diamonds F.C.
- 2002: Chaddy the Owl — Oldham Athletic A.F.C.
- 2003: Chaddy the Owl — Oldham Athletic A.F.C.
- 2004: Graham the Gorilla — Finedon Volta F.C.
- 2005: Scoop Six Squirrel — The Sun newspaper
- 2006: Mickey the Monkey — Kick 4 Life
- 2007: Wacky Macky Bear — Saffron Walden Town F.C.
- 2008: Wacky Macky Bear — Saffron Walden Town F.C.
- 2009: Stag — Huntingdon Rugby Club
- 2010: Mr Bumble — Barnet F.C.
- 2011: not held
- 2012: Mr Bumble — Barnet F.C.
- 2013: Barry Barratt — Barratt Homes safety mascot
