= 2011 Hartlepool Borough Council election =

2011 UK local government election

Results of the 2011 Hartlepool Borough Council election

The 2011 Hartlepool Borough Council election took place on 5 May 2011 to fill a third of the Hartlepool Borough Council's seats, though there was no election that year in Elwick. No seats were earned unopposed. The Labour Party earned 46% of votes cast and won 69% of the available seats.

== Election result ==
Hartlepool Borough Election, 2011
Party	Seats	Gains	Losses	Net gain/loss	Seats %	Votes %	Votes	+/−
BNP	0				0%	1.0%	211	
Conservative	1				6.25%	23.8%	4,987	
Labour	11				68.75%	45.6%	9,550	
Liberal Democrats	0				0%	5.65%	664	
UKIP	0				0%	11.1%	2,323	
Independent	4				25%	14.8%	3,102	

== Ward results ==
Brus Ward (1 Councillor)
Party	Candidate	Votes	%	±%
Labour	Mick Fenwick	727	61.15%	
Conservative	Jean McKenna	213	17.92%	
Independent	Michelle Plant	249	20.95%	
Majority		727	61.15%	
Turnout		1,189	24.60%	

Burn Valley Ward (1 Councillor)
Party	Candidate	Votes	%	±%
Conservative	Andrew Gough	389	32.17%	
Labour	Ged Hall	820	67.83%	
Majority		820	67.83%	
Turnout		1,209	30.10%	

Dyke House Ward (1 Councillor)
Party	Candidate	Votes	%	±%
Conservative	Bret Addison	105	11.91%	
Liberal Democrats	Mark Peter Bennison	70	7.94%	
UKIP	Amanda Duran	219	24.83%	
Labour	Linda Shields	488	55.33%	
Majority		488	55.33%	
Turnout		882	25.30%	

Fens Ward (1 Councillor)
Party	Candidate	Votes	%	±%
Independent	Alison Lilley	460	31.19%	
Labour	Stephen Myers	415	28.14%	
Liberal Democrats	Elizabeth Parkinson	188	12.75%	
UKIP	George Springer	341	23.12%	
Conservative	Ray Wells	171	11.60%	
Majority		460	31.19%	
Turnout		1,475	39.20%	

Foggy Furze Ward (1 Councillor)
Party	Candidate	Votes	%	±%
Liberal Democrats	Lynne Gillam	144	13.46%	
Conservative	Ray Pocklington	272	25.43%	
Labour	Kaylee Sirs	654	61.13%	
Majority		654	61.13%	
Turnout		1,070	28.20%	

Grange Ward (1 Councillor)
Party	Candidate	Votes	%	±%
Conservative	Kevin Mayson	231	18.02%	
Labour	Chris Simmons	781	60.93%	
Liberal Democrats	Jim Tighe	117	9.13%	
UKIP	Ronnie Whitlock	153	11.94%	
Majority		781	60.93%	
Turnout		1,282	31.40%	

Greatham Ward (1 Councillor)
Party	Candidate	Votes	%	±%
Independent	Geoff Lilley	354	48.37%	
Independent	Micheal McKie	224	30.61%	
Labour	Ken Natt	104	14.21%	
Conservative	David Young	50	6.84%	
Majority		578	78.97%	
Turnout		732	44.50%	

Hart Ward (1 Councillor)
Party	Candidate	Votes	%	±%
Conservative	Bob Addison	554	30.61%	
Independent	Lee Holland	190	10.50%	
Liberal Democrats	Robert Price	104	5.75%	
Labour	Jean Robinson	854	47.19%	
Majority		854	47.19%	
Turnout		1,810	34.90%	

Owton Ward (1 Councillor)
Party	Candidate	Votes	%	±%
UKIP	Peter Joyce	113	13.30%	
Liberal Democrats	Patricia Rayner	41	4.79%	
Conservative	Helen Wells	77	9%	
Labour	Angie Wilcox	625	73.02%	
Majority		625	73.02%	
Turnout		856	21.20%	

Park Ward (1 Councillor)
Party	Candidate	Votes	%	±%
Labour	Moss Boddy	401	20.02%	
Conservative	Brenda Loynes	1,123	56%	
UKIP	Eric Wilson	479	23.92%	
Majority		1,123	56%	
Turnout		2,003	43.60%	

Rift House Ward (1 Councillor)
Party	Candidate	Votes	%	±%
BNP	Ronnie Bage	211	13.54%	
Conservative	Michael Corrigan	300	19.25%	
Labour	Sylvia Tempest	760	48.75%	
Independent	Steve Wright	288	18.48%	
Majority		760	48.75%	
Turnout		1,559	33.30%	

Rossmere Ward (1 Councillor)
Party	Candidate	Votes	%	±%
Labour	Ann Marshall	747	53.86%	
UKIP	Dave Pascoe	457	32.95%	
Conservative	Sam Wells	183	13.20%	
Majority		747	53.86%	
Turnout		1,387	28.80%	

Seaton Ward (1 Councillor)
Party	Candidate	Votes	%	±%
Conservative	Alec Gough	506	27.17%	
Independent	Cath Hill	931	49.98%	
Labour	Stuart Shields	426	22.87%	
Majority		931	49.98%	
Turnout		1,863	35.40%	

Stranton Ward (1 Councillor)
Party	Candidate	Votes	%	±%
Conservative	John Coward	150	16.82%	
UKIP	Kath Hill	202	22.65%	
Labour	Jane Shaw	540	60.54%	
Majority		540	60.54%	
Turnout		892	22.50%	

Throston Ward (1 Councillor)
Party	Candidate	Votes	%	±%
Labour	P Jackson	852	63.26%	
Conservative	D Loynes	495	36.74%	
Majority		852	63.26%	
Turnout		1,347	29.50%	
