= 2012 English mayoral referendums =

Map showing referendum results by authority; Green = Yes, Red = No

A series of mayoral referendums were held on 3 May 2012 in England's 11 largest cities to determine whether to introduce directly elected mayors to provide political leadership, replacing their current council leaders, who are elected by the local council.

Parliamentary approval was granted for referendums to be held in Birmingham, Bradford, Bristol, Coventry, Leeds, Manchester, Newcastle upon Tyne, Nottingham, Sheffield and Wakefield. The government had also intended to hold referendums on whether to introduce directly elected mayors in Leicester and Liverpool, however before the government could order these referendums, the two city councils had already decided to adopt a mayoral system themselves. Leicester City Council voted to introduce a mayor in 2010 without holding a referendum, and an election was held in 2011 for the position. Meanwhile, despite legislation being passed for a referendum in Liverpool, the City Council voted to bypass the referendum and to instead hold a mayoral election on the same day as other local elections in May.

In addition, Doncaster Borough Council decided to hold a referendum on the same day, to determine whether to retain their elected mayoral system, having been one of the earliest authorities to adopt one, in 2001.

In only one of the eleven cities did the referendum result in a vote for the introduction of a mayor; Doncaster's mayoralty was retained.

On 26 January 2012 electors in Salford voted in favour of an elected mayor by 17,344 votes to 13,653. There was an inaugural 2012 Salford mayoral election on the same day as 2012 United Kingdom local elections.

== Background ==
Directly elected mayorship in the United Kingdom was first established by Tony Blair's Labour Government with the creation of the Mayor of London. The Local Government Act 2000 then provided all councils in England and Wales with a range of options as to how to operate its executive functions, including the option of a directly elected mayor. The Act also provided that a petition of more than 5% of the electorate of a council area could force that council to hold a referendum on whether to introduce a directly elected mayor.

As of January 2011, there had been 40 of these referendums with a further one planned in Salford for 26 January 2012. Of these 40, only 13 had voted in favour of the introduction of a mayor, with 27 rejecting the proposal. These figures included two referendums held in Stoke-on-Trent, the first in 2002 that had approved the creation of a directly elected mayor, and the second in 2008 that had seen the electorate vote to abolish the position.

In 2009, the then Conservative Opposition, who were well ahead in opinion polling for the following year's general election, had said they would introduce elected mayors for England's 12 biggest cities, if they won power. In the 2010 general election, they did win power, albeit in a coalition government with the Liberal Democrats, and Prime Minister David Cameron reaffirmed his previous commitment to hold a series of referendums on whether to introduce mayors for the biggest English cities.

The Department for Communities and Local Government launched a consultation on 1 November 2011 to decide what powers any newly created city mayors could have at their disposal. The list of powers the government considered devolving included power over rail and bus services, skills, apprenticeships, and money to invest in high speed broadband and other economic infrastructure. Shortly after announcing this consultation, the government confirmed that 11 referendums would all be held on 3 May 2012.

== Question ==
The question that was asked in the referendum was set by central government, and read as follows:

How would you like [name of city] to be run?
- By a leader who is an elected councillor chosen by a vote of the other elected councillors. This is how the council is run now.
Or
- By a mayor who is elected by voters. This would be a change from how the council is run now.

== Overview of results ==
City	Date	Result	Yes %	No %	Turnout % (valid ballots)	Notes
Birmingham	3 May	No	42.0	58.0	27.6	
Bradford	3 May	No	44.9	55.1	33.5	
Bristol	3 May	Yes	53.3	46.7	24.1	
Coventry	3 May	No	36.4	63.6	26.2	
Doncaster	3 May	Retain	62.0	38.0		Referendum to decide on whether to retain or abolish existing directly elected mayor.
Leeds	3 May	No	36.7	63.3	30.3	
Manchester	3 May	No	46.8	53.2	24.7	
Newcastle upon Tyne	3 May	No	38.06	61.94	32.0	
Nottingham	3 May	No	42.5	57.5	27.6	
Sheffield	3 May	No	35.0	65.0	32.1	
Wakefield	3 May	No	37.8	62.2	28.6	

== Cities ==
=== Birmingham ===
The referendum was held prior to decisions on the Mayoral responsibilities. Amongst those campaigning for a 'yes' vote in Birmingham were Gisela Stuart, Labour MP for Birmingham Edgbaston, Liam Byrne, Labour MP for Birmingham Hodge Hill, Sir Albert Bore, the leader of the Labour group on Birmingham City Council, and Siôn Simon, the former Labour MP for Birmingham Erdington.

Liam Byrne confirmed he would stand for his party's nomination were voters to approve plans in the referendum. He was supported by ex-Birmingham City Council leader Sir Albert Bore.

Those advocating a 'no' vote included Roger Godsiff, Labour MP for Birmingham Hall Green and John Hemming, Liberal Democrat MP for Birmingham Yardley.

Birmingham Mayoral referendum 2012
Choice	Votes	%
For	88,085	42.21
Against	120,611	57.79
Total	208,696	100.00
Registered voters/turnout		28.35

The post of West Midlands Mayor, chairing the West Midlands Combined Authority, was introduced in 2017 without a further referendum.

=== Bradford ===
All three main political parties in Bradford - Labour, the Conservatives and the Liberal Democrats declared their opposition to an elected mayor for the city, whilst the Conservative MP Kris Hopkins, who was previously leader of Bradford Council, also campaigned for a 'no' vote in his Keighley constituency in the hope that such an outcome would help the area 'break-away' from Bradford. George Galloway, who was elected MP for Bradford West in a by-election five weeks before the referendum, declared his support for a directly elected mayor shortly after his election, making him the sole Bradford MP in favour of the proposal.

Bradford Mayoral referendum 2012
Choice	Votes	%
For	53,949	44.87
Against	66,283	55.13
Required majority		50
Total	120,232	100.00
Registered voters/turnout	341,126	35

=== Bristol ===
The out-going Leader of Bristol City Council, Barbara Janke, was opposed to the introduction of a directly elected mayor, as was the rest of her Liberal Democrat group, whilst the city's Green Party were also opposed. The Conservatives were the only party in the city to openly support the introduction of a mayor, whilst Labour adopted a neutral approach of "let the people decide". The leader of Bristol City Council described the electorate as "palpably apathetic" on the issue.

Bristol Mayoral referendum 2012
Choice	Votes	%
For	41,032	53.35
Against	35,880	46.65
Required majority		50
Total	76,912	100.00
Registered voters/turnout		24

=== Coventry ===
Labour controlled Coventry Council said they believed an elected mayor is unnecessary, and were supported by the Liberal Democrats, Socialist, and the majority of Conservative councillors in a council motion formally opposing the idea of a directly elected mayor. All of Coventry's MPs declared their opposition to the plan too, with the sole exception of Bob Ainsworth, former Defence Secretary and MP for Coventry North East, who suggested that the position would make the council more accountable to the electorate.

Coventry Mayoral referendum 2012
Choice	Votes	%
For	22,619	36.42
Against	39,483	63.58
Total	62,102	100.00
Valid votes	62,102	98.49
Invalid/blank votes	955	1.51
Total votes	63,057	100.00
Registered voters/turnout	236,818	26.63

The post of West Midlands Mayor (covering the West Midlands county, including Coventry) was introduced in 2017, without a further referendum.

=== Leeds ===
The Labour leader of Leeds City Council criticised the proposals for an elected mayor as "utter madness", whilst the Conservative and Liberal Democrat group leaders on the City Council also both expressed their opposition to the plan, and advocated a 'no' vote.

Leeds Mayoral referendum 2012
Choice	Votes	%
For	62,440	36.65
Against	107,910	63.35
Total	170,350	100.00
Valid votes	170,350	97.65
Invalid/blank votes	4,092	2.35
Total votes	174,442	100.00
Registered voters/turnout		31

=== Manchester ===
The non-political Chief Executive of Manchester City Council, Sir Howard Bernstein, responded to the government's consultation of elected mayors by stating that such a position was not suitable for Manchester. Some analysts and local business leaders have stated their opposition to a mayoral system of local governance in Manchester and have stated the progress Manchester has made over the past 20 years that shows the current system is adequate.

Amongst the local political parties, the leader of the Liberal Democrat group on Manchester City Council publicly declared his support for the proposals, whilst the Manchester Evening News reported that many Labour politicians were "quietly opposed to change". Manchester narrowly voted against a mayor; the result was however much closer than many local politicians and media predicted, and far closer than the other ten cities which also held mayoral referendums.

A poll of almost 1000 Mancunians by the MEN in April 2012 found a majority preferred the current system of a council leader and their cabinet rather than a mayoral system of local government. The poll found however that a majority would favour a mayor for the wider Greater Manchester region, which includes 10 metropolitan boroughs, over a system of individual mayors for towns and cities. On 3 November 2014 it was announced that a directly elected Mayor for the Greater Manchester region would be introduced with the first Mayoral elections to be held in 2017.

Manchester Mayoral referendum 2012
Choice	Votes	%
For	42,677	46.76
Against	48,593	53.24
Total	91,270	100.00
Valid votes	91,270	97.35
Invalid/blank votes	2,485	2.65
Total votes	93,755	100.00

=== Newcastle upon Tyne ===
A campaign group advocating a 'yes' vote in the Newcastle referendum was led by Brian Moore, former Chairman of the Newcastle Conservative Party. The idea was backed by Newcastle First, a local political party, and the Conservative Member of Parliament for Hexham.

The local Labour and Liberal Democrat groups had previously expressed their opposition to an elected mayor but both of their group leaders declared their intentions to stand if the position was created.

Newcastle upon Tyne Mayoral referendum 2012
Choice	Votes	%
For	24,630	38.06
Against	40,089	61.94
Total	64,719	100.00

=== Nottingham ===
Nottingham City Council has previously rejected calls to hold a referendum using its own powers under the Local Government Act 2000, and the leader of the council, Jon Collins, has also previously expressed his personal opposition to an elected mayor because of the potential of such a position leading to a dysfunctional council. The local Liberal Democrats also expressed their opposition to the proposals, and advocated a 'no' vote.

The vote went against an elected mayor.

Nottingham Mayoral referendum 2012
Choice	Votes	%
For	20,943	42.51
Against	28,320	57.49
Total	49,263	100.00
Registered voters/turnout		23.9

=== Sheffield ===
The Labour and Liberal Democrat groups on Sheffield City Council both expressed opposition to the idea of an elected mayor, whilst the regional director of the Confederation of British Industry, Andrew Palmer, also expressed doubt over the plan. The trade union Unison also actively campaigned for a 'no' vote in the referendum.

Support for the proposal was given by the local Conservative party, who claimed a directly elected mayor would be more accountable to the electorate, as well as other local business owners who claimed a directly elected mayor would hold a "stronger mandate to take decisions".

Sheffield Mayoral referendum 2012
Choice	Votes	%
For	44,571	34.97
Against	82,890	65.03
Total	127,461	100.00

=== Wakefield ===
Although critical of the post, Wakefield Council leader Peter Box suggested he would put his name forward if the referendum was passed.

Amongst the local political parties, the Conservative group leader on Wakefield Council declared his party's support for the status quo, whilst the local UK Independence Party expressed support for the mayoral position.

Wakefield Mayoral referendum 2012
Choice	Votes	%
For	27,610	37.84
Against	45,357	62.16
Total	72,967	100.00
