= 2000 Hartlepool Borough Council election =

English council election

Elections to Hartlepool Borough Council in the ceremonial county of County Durham in England were held on 4 May 2000. One third of the council was up for election and the Labour Party lost overall control of the council to no overall control.

After the election, the composition of the council was:

- Labour 21
- Liberal Democrats 14
- Conservative 10
- Independent 2

== Campaign ==
15 seats were up for election in 2000 with Labour defending 13 seats that they had won in the 1996 election. Before the election six of those seats were seen as being vulnerable including Dyke House, Grange, Park and Seaton wards. The Labour Party however was seen as strongly favoured to maintain a majority on the council. A four per cent swing was required in order for the Labour Party to lose control of the council.

The Liberal Democrats and Conservative parties said that voters were unhappy with the Labour national government and that the election was a chance for voters to demonstrate this. Labour accused the other two parties of having done a deal to avoid opposing each other in some of the wards where Labour might be defeated. However the Conservatives said that this was "pure coincidence", and the Liberal Democrats said that there no deal between them before the election. The Conservative Party did not put up candidates in five wards, while the Liberal Democrats did not stand in Seaton and Throston wards.

Opponents accused council leader Russell Hart of concentrating on building up his own importance and during the campaign they circulated fake five pound notes with Hart's face on instead of the Queen. Meanwhile, Labour brought in a series of national figures to campaign for the party in the election including Members of Parliament (MPs) Hilary Armstrong, Joyce Quin, Alan Howarth and Member of the European Parliament Gordon Adam.

== Election result ==
The results saw Labour lose overall control of the council for the first time in 21 years. The nine gains made by the Liberal Democrats and Conservatives exceeded pre-election expectations. Defeated Labour councillors included Stephen Wallace, the election agent for local MP Peter Mandelson, former election agent Bernard Carr, mayor Ron Watts and longest serving councillor Bill Iseley, who had been a councillor for 39 years. Overall turnout in the election was 27%.

Conservative national party leader William Hague said that "The Hartlepool result shows that the Conservatives can fight and win in all areas of Britain", while the Liberal Democrats described the results as showing "that the people of Hartlepool have rejected Labour". However Labour blamed the results on an election deal between the Liberal Democrats and Conservatives.

Hartlepool local election result 2000
Party	Seats	Gains	Losses	Net gain/loss	Seats %	Votes %	Votes	+/−
Liberal Democrats	7	5	0	+5	46.7			
Labour	4	0	9	-9	26.7			
Conservative	4	4	0	+4	26.7			

== Aftermath ==
Following the election the Liberal Democrats and Conservatives began talks on an agreement to run the council between themselves. A special council meeting took place on 25 May and the two parties took control with Liberal Democrat Arthur Preece becoming the new council leader.
