= Stuart Drummond =

British politician (born 1973)

Mayor of Hartlepool
- In office 6 May 2002 – 2 May 2013
- Preceded by: Office created
- Succeeded by: Office abolished

Personal details
- Born: 29 November 1973 (age 52)
- Party: Independent
- Spouse: Rebecca Buttery (m. 2006)
- Children: 3
- Education: Hartlepool Sixth Form College
- Alma mater: University of Salford

Stuart Drummond (born 29 November 1973) is a British politician, who was the first and only directly elected mayor of Hartlepool in North East England. He was first elected in 2002, under the guise of H'Angus the Monkey, the town's football club's mascot, and was re-elected in 2005 and 2009. He was the first elected mayor in Britain to win a third term. He stood down when his term ended in May 2013 after the councillors and people of Hartlepool voted to abolish the mayoral system on 15 November 2012.

== Biography ==
Drummond was born 29 November 1973. He attended Hartlepool Sixth Form College, before he gained a HND in business finance and languages at the University of Salford. He worked on cruise ships, travelling the globe for a couple of years and then worked in a call centre back in his home town. Before his election, he was the mascot – H'Angus the Monkey – for Hartlepool United F.C.

== Mayor of Hartlepool ==
Drummond stood for election to Mayor of the Borough of Hartlepool, a unitary authority in the north east of England, in the 2002 election. He considered standing for MP in the 2001 General Election, but decided against it.

He approached Hartlepool United Football Club chairman Ken Hodcroft with the idea to stand for Mayor and the club was happy to put up his £500 election deposit. The club saw it as a chance to generate publicity and their name and club sponsors were given a global platform. Drummond took part in no serious campaigning and among his promises was for the council to provide free bananas for school children in the town - which he later delivered. Online bookmakers Bet365 offered odds on Drummond / H'Angus being elected and odds tumbled in one day from 100-1 to 4-1 as his supporters showed their support.

Drummond was narrowly elected, beating the second place, high-profile Labour Party candidate by 5,696 to 5,174. The result was greeted with widespread hilarity, attracting attention far beyond Hartlepool. Canada's National Post newspaper ran the headline "Monkey wins mayoralty, regains human form". The Northern Echo ran with 'Monkey Is Mayor" - despite the paper's deadline being before the actual result was declared, such was the confidence within Drummond's camp on the night of the vote.

After his election, Drummond immediately stood down as mascot. He said: "I am just a normal guy off the street, listening to the views of the public and I am the voice of the public. I haven't got a big party backing me and I have been using the monkey to promote myself, promote my campaign." Peter Mandelson, the town's then MP, was present at the count in the Mill House Sports Centre in the early hours of the morning and cut an unhappy figure as his candidate, Leo Gillen, was beaten. Drummond alleged that Mandelson pulled him to one side and called him a "disgrace" and said that he'd "made the town a laughing stock", before praising Drummond in a television interview minutes later. On 5 May 2005, Drummond was re-elected as the mayor of Hartlepool with an increased majority of 10,205. On 4 June 2009, Drummond was re-elected for a third term. In 2010 Drummond was a finalist for the World Mayor prize.

A campaign group set up in 2006 hoped to petition for a referendum that would abolish the office of mayor and adopt the leader and cabinet system of local government leadership. The referendum occurred on 15 November 2012, after the majority Labour group on Hartlepool council established a referendum which resulted in the council leader and cabinet system being favoured. The leader and cabinet system became the governance structure for the council in May 2013. Since his reign as Mayor, Drummond remained in Hartlepool until 2022 and was a prominent figurehead amongst local businesses acting as a consultant for several organisations.

== Personal life ==
On his re-election in 2005, he immediately proposed to his then girlfriend, Rebecca Buttery, who accepted and said yes. The pair were married a year later. They have three children. Drummond appeared on the ITV game show Tenable in April 2018. He and his team mates were all Hartlepool fans and named their team The Cheeky Monkey Hangers. They failed to win a cash prize. In October 2021, Drummond revealed that he and his family were emigrating to Australia the following year.

Preceded by New Creation	Mayor of Hartlepool; 2002 – 2013	Succeeded by Office Abolished
