= Veterans and People's Party =

Political party in the United Kingdom

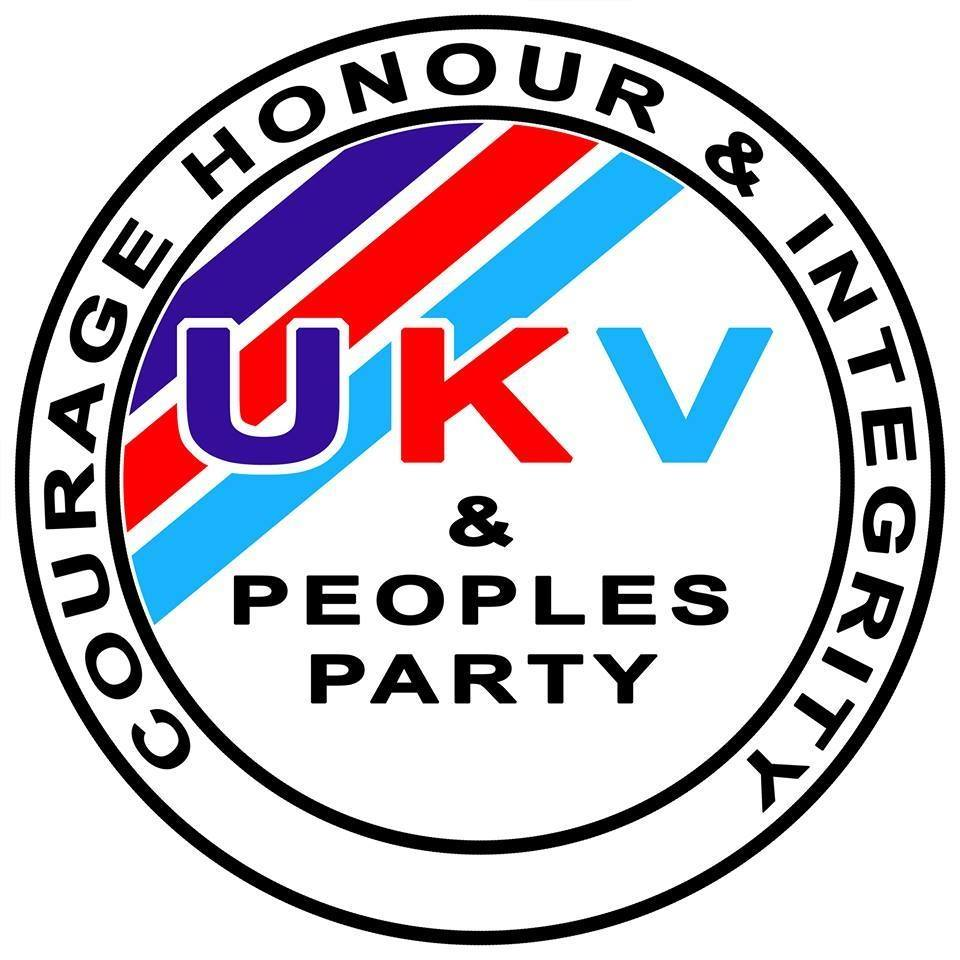
- Leader: George Reid
- Founder: Damian McAndrew
- Founded: May 2017
- Headquarters: 20-22 Wenlock Road; London; N1 7GU; United Kingdom
- Ideology: Right-wing populism British nationalism Hard Euroscepticism; Paternalistic conservatism
- Colours: Gold

Website
- ukvpp.org

The Veterans and People's Party (VPP) was a minor political party in the United Kingdom. It was founded in mid-May 2017 by seven British military veterans to contest the 2017 United Kingdom general election and claimed to have gained 8,000 members in its first month of existence. It was statutorily deregistered by the Electoral Commission in 2022. The party described itself as conservative and "anti-sharia-law".

In the 2019 United Kingdom local elections, the party gained its first two councillors from eight fielded candidates.

In September 2019, with the Independent Union councillors, the VPP councillor who made up the coalition at Hartlepool Borough Council defected to the Brexit Party, renaming their already existing coalition with the three Conservative councillors as the "Brexit and Conservative Coalition".

In February 2020, its councillor returned to the VPP after the government's Brexit agreement.

== Hartlepool Borough Council ==
In May 2019, following several defections from Labour to Socialist Labour at Hartlepool Borough Council, the party's councillor joined a coalition with the Conservatives and the Independent Union, forming the largest grouping with 11 councillors, fewer than needed for control.

In September 2019, with Independent Union colleagues, he joined the Brexit Party, but returned to the VPP in early 2020.
