= Independent Union (political party) =

Political party in the United Kingdom

- Leader: Shane Moore
- Founders: John Tennant; Shane Moore; Tim Fleming; James Brewer; Bob Buchan; Thomas Cassidy
- Founded: 18 February 2019
- Headquarters: 36 Sedgewick Close HARTLEPOOL Cleveland TS24 9EU https://search.electoralcommission.org.uk/English/Registrations/PP7984
- Ideology: Euroscepticism
- Colours: Navy
- Hartlepool Borough Council: 0 / 36

Independent Union was a minor political party in the United Kingdom. It was founded in February 2019 by six independent councillors on Hartlepool Borough Council to contest in the 2019 United Kingdom local elections, the party gaining a councillor and retaining another out of a total of five fielded candidates.

== Hartlepool Borough Council ==
In May 2019, following multiple defections from Labour to Socialist Labour at Hartlepool Borough Council, Independent Union forged a coalition with the Conservatives and the Veterans and People's Party, forming the largest grouping with 11 councillors, 6 shy of control. At the Annual General Meeting of the council, leader of the coalition, Cllr Shane Moore, was elected the Leader of the Council, with his Deputy, Cllr Mike Young being voted deputy leader.

In September 2019, all IU councillors, as well as the one Veterans and People's Party councillor, who made up the coalition at Hartlepool Borough Council defected to the Brexit Party, renaming their already existing coalition with the three Conservative councillors to the "Brexit and Conservative Coalition". Despite this, the IU was still registered with the Electoral Commission with Shane Moore listed as its current leader. The party leader has been Shane Moore since 2019.

In early 2020, several of the councillors concerned returned to their parties, including the Independent Union and Veterans and People's Party.

== European Election 2019 ==
In May 2019, it was announced that IU leader, Cllr John Tennant, was standing as a Brexit Party candidate in the 2019 European Parliament election for North East England. Upon the announcement, Tennant was criticised for comments he made on social media, praising the UKIP MEP Godfrey Bloom on the day he was ejected from the European parliament for addressing German colleague, Martin Schulz, the then leader of the German Social Democratic Party, with a Nazi slogan in 2010, and then another involving a joke he made regarding sex acts with a young woman in 2011. Tennant, the former UKIP group leader for the council, is said to have had a close relationship with Nigel Farage whilst he was a UKIP councillor, organising his public events in the North East, according to a former UKIP advisor. According to Hartleborough Borough Council's Register of Members' Disclosable Pecuniary Interests, in May 2018 Tennant declared his profession as "office manager" to UKIP MEP Jonathan Arnott.
