= List of Hartlepool United F.C. records and statistics =

Hartlepool United Football Club is a professional association football club based in Hartlepool, County Durham, England. The club competes in the National League, the fifth level of the English football league system.

They were founded in 1908 as Hartlepools United Football Athletic Company. West Hartlepool won the FA Amateur Cup in 1905 and after the club was dissolved in 1910 its assets and liabilities were subsequently taken over by Hartlepools United, who were then playing in the North Eastern League. Hartlepools United were elected into the Football League in 1921 and would spend the next 37 years in the Third Division North, at which point they were placed into the Fourth Division. In 1968, the s and the United of the club's name were removed due to the merger of West Hartlepool with the town of Hartlepool and the village of Hart - forming the new borough of Hartlepool. The club won promotion in 1967–68 for the first time, though were relegated out of the Third Division the following season. In 1977, the United was added back to the team's name. They won another promotion in 1990–91, though were relegated in 1993–94. They won further promotions out of the fourth tier in 2002–03 and 2006–07, having been relegated again in 2005–06 after losing the 2005 League One play-off final to Sheffield Wednesday in the previous season. Hartlepool were relegated again in 2012–13 and ended their 96-year run in the Football League with relegation into the National League in 2016–17. Hartlepool achieved promotion back to the Football League in 2020–21, beating Torquay United in the 2021 National League play-off final. However, Hartlepool returned to the National League after two seasons following relegation in 2022–23.

This list encompasses the major honours won by Hartlepool United, and records set by the club, its players and its managers. The player records section itemises the club's leading goalscorers and those who have made most appearances in first-team competitions. It also records notable achievements by Hartlepool players on the international stage. Attendance records are also included.

All figures are correct as of the match played on 5 May 2025.

== Honours ==
Hartlepool United's honours include the following:

League

- Third Division North / League One (level 3)
  - Runners-up: 1956–57
  - Play-off runners-up: 2005
- Fourth Division / Third Division / League Two (level 4)
  - Runners-up: 2002–03, 2006–07
  - Promoted: 1967–68, 1990–91
- National League (level 5)
  - Play-off winners: 2021

Cup

- FA Amateur Cup
  - Winners: 1904–05
- Durham Challenge Cup
  - Winners: 1908–09, 1909–10, 1956–57, 1957–58, 2004–05
  - Runners-up: 1997–98

Reserves & Youth

- Division One East League
  - Champions: 2003–04, 2007–08
  - Runners-up: 2016–17
- FL Youth Alliance
  - Champions: 2002–03
- Dallas Cup U19
  - Winners: 2003–04
  - Third place: 2004–05

=== Best performances ===
Up to and including the 2024–25 season

- Best FA Cup performance: Fourth round, 1954–55, 1977–78, 1988–89, 1992–93, 2004–05, 2008–09, 2021–22
- Best League Cup performance: Fourth round, 1974–75
- Best League Trophy performance: Semi-final, 2021–22
- Best FA Trophy performance: Fourth round, 2023–24
- Highest league finish: 2nd in Third Division North, equivalent to 47th in the English football league system, 1956–57
- Seasons spent at level 3 of the football league system: 43
- Seasons spent at level 4 of the football league system: 48
- Seasons spent at level 5 of the football league system: 6

== Player records ==
=== Appearances ===
- Youngest first-team player: David Foley, 16 years and 44 days (against Port Vale), Football League Second Division, 25 August 2003.
- Oldest first-team player: Dimitrios Konstantopoulos, 41 years and 15 days (against Harrogate Town), FA Trophy, 14 December 2019.
- Oldest first-team player (league): Mick Tait, 40 years and 173 days (against Fulham), Third Division, 22 March 1997
- Most consecutive league appearances: Ritchie Humphreys, 234

==== Most appearances ====
Rank	Player	Apps	Goals	Position	Career
1	Ritchie Humphreys	543	37	DF, MF	2001–2013
2	Watty Moore	472	3	DF	1948–1960
3	Nicky Featherstone	463	28	MF	2014–2023, 2023–2025
4	Antony Sweeney	444	62	MF	2001–2014
5	Ray Thompson	423	3	DF	1947–1958
6	Alan Goad	418	11	DF	1967–1978
7	Ken Johnson	413	106	FW	1949–1964
8	Brian Honour	384	36	MF	1985–1994
9	Micky Barron	374	4	DF	1996–2007
10	Gary Liddle	364	21	DF, MF	2006–2012, 2019–20, 2020–2022

=== Goalscorers ===
- Youngest goalscorer: Luke James, 17 years and 64 days
- Oldest goalscorer: Jackie Carr, 39 years and 304 days
- Most goals in a match (Football League): 5 goals
  - Bobby Folland vs. Oldham Athletic, Fourth Division, 15 April 1961
  - Harry Simmons vs. Wigan Borough, Third Division North, 1 January 1931
- Most goals in a match (FA Cup): Billy Smith (7 goals) vs. St Peters Albion, FA Cup fourth qualifying round, 17 November 1923
- Most goals in a game as a substitute: 3 goals
  - Joel Porter vs. Lincoln City, Football League Trophy, 9 October 2007
  - Emmanuel Dieseruvwe vs. Sutton United, National League, 5 October 2024

==== Top goalscorers ====
Rank	Player	Goals	Apps	Position	Career
1	Joshie Fletcher	111		FW	1908–13
2	Johnny Wigham	106	291		1931–39
2	Ken Johnson	106	413	FW	1949–64
4	Keith Houchen	94	310	FW	1978–82, 1993–96
5	Paul Baker	93	279	FW	1987–92, 1997–99
6	Eric Wildon	89	215		1948–55
7	Tommy McGuigan	79	350	FW	1950–58
7	Joe Allon	79	194	FW	1988–91, 1995–98
7	Adam Boyd	79	273	FW	1999–2006, 2009–12
10	Ralph Pedwell	68	164	MF	1929–34
10	George Luke	68	205	MF	1953–59

=== International caps ===
- First capped player: Ambrose Fogarty, for Republic of Ireland against Spain, 11 March 1964.
- Most capped player: Jermaine Francis with 3 caps for Grenada as a Hartlepool United player.

== Managerial records ==
- First manager: Fred Priest, managed 145 matches between 1908 and 1912
- Longest serving manager: Fred Westgarth, managed from 1943 to 1957

== Club records ==
=== Matches ===
==== Firsts ====
- First match at Victoria Park: Hartlepools United 6–0 Newcastle United XI, 2 September 1908
- First Football League match: Wrexham 0–2 Hartlepools United, Third Division North, 27 August 1921
- First National League match: Hartlepool United 0–1 Dover Athletic, 5 August 2017
- First FA Cup match: West Hartlepool 1–2 Hartlepools United, first qualifying round, 3 October 1908
- First League Cup match: Oldham Athletic 2–1 Hartlepools United, first round, 11 October 1960
- First FA Trophy match: Workington 1–0 Hartlepool United, first round, 16 December 2017

==== Record wins ====
- Record Football League win: Hartlepools United 10–1 Barrow, Fourth Division, 4 April 1959
- Record league win: Hartlepools United 12–0 Workington, North-Eastern League, 20 April 1910
- Record FA Cup win: Hartlepools United 10–1 St Peters Albion, fourth qualifying round, 17 November 1923
- Record League Cup win: Hartlepool United 5–1 Bury, first round, 23 August 1994
- Record League Trophy win: Hartlepool United 5–0 Bradford City, first round, 3 September 2013
- Record FA Trophy win: City of Liverpool 1–5 Hartlepool United, third round, 9 December 2023

==== Record defeats ====
- Record defeat: Hartlepool United 0–10 Middlesbrough U21, National League Cup, 11 August 2026
- Record league defeat: Wrexham 10–1 Hartlepools United, Fourth Division, 3 March 1962
- Record FA Cup defeat
  - Port Vale 6–0 Hartlepool United, first round, 12 November 1994
  - Manchester City 6–0 Hartlepool United, third round, 3 January 1976
- Record League Cup defeat
  - Crystal Palace 6–1 Hartlepool United, second round, 8 October 1991
  - Aston Villa 6–1 Hartlepool, fourth round replay, 25 November 1974
  - Rotherham United 5–0 Hartlepool United, first round, 12 August 1978
  - Tottenham Hotspur 5–0 Hartlepool United, second round, 26 September 1990
  - Hartlepool United 0–5 Arsenal, second round, 21 September 1994
  - Arsenal 5–0 Hartlepool United, second round, 3 October 1995
  - Crewe Alexandra 5–0 Hartlepool United, first round, 11 August 2012
- Record League Trophy defeat: Crewe Alexandra 8–0 Hartlepool United, first group match, 17 October 1995

=== Record consecutive results ===
- Record consecutive league wins: 9 matches, 18 November 2006 – 1 January 2007
- Record consecutive draws: 6 matches, 30 April 2011 – 20 August 2011
- Record consecutive defeats: 9 matches
  - 28 March 1970 – 19 August 1970
  - 23 January 1993 – 27 February 1993
- Record consecutive league defeats: 8 matches
  - 8 April 1950 – 26 August 1950
  - 28 March 1970 – 15 August 1970
  - 27 January 1993 – 27 February 1993
- Record consecutive clean sheets: 8 matches, 5 December 2006 – 1 January 2007
- Record consecutive matches without scoring: 13 matches, 9 January 1993 – 2 March 1993
- Longest winless run: 22 matches, 8 September 2012 – 26 December 2012
- Longest winless run (league): 20 matches
  - 8 September 2012 – 26 December 2012
  - 26 March 2022 – 30 September 2022

=== Attendance records ===
- Highest attendance: 17,264 vs. Manchester United, FA Cup, 5 January 1957
- Highest league home attendance: 17,118 vs. Hull City, Third Division North, 9 October 1948
- Highest League Cup home attendance: 12,305 vs. Aston Villa, fourth round, 12 November 1974
- Highest League Trophy home attendance: 7,532 vs. Rotherham United, semi-final, 9 March 2022
- Highest home attendance (21st century): 7,784 vs. Leeds United, Football League One, 26 December 2007
- Highest attendance (neutral venue): 59,808 vs. Sheffield Wednesday, 2005 Football League One play-off final, 29 May 2005
- Lowest home attendance: 380 vs. Rochdale, EFL Trophy group stage, 9 November 2016
- Lowest league home attendance: 790 vs. Stockport County, Fourth Division, 5 May 1984
- Lowest FA Cup home attendance: 1,267 vs. Gillingham, fourth qualifying round replay, 14 October 2025

== Annual awards ==
=== Club Player of the Year ===
As of the end of the 2023–24 season

Season	Level (Note: The official level of competition in the structure of the English football league system.)	Name	Position (Note: For a detailed description of playing positions, see Association football positions.)	Nationality	Apps (Note: Appearances and goals from the season the player won the award. Includes appearances and goals in the Football League (including play-offs), National League (including play-offs), FA Cup, League Cup, Associate Members Cup/Football League Trophy/EFL Trophy and FA Trophy.)	Goals	Ref
1971–72	4	Neil Warnock	Midfielder	England	49	5	
1990–91	4	Brian Honour	Midfielder	England	50	4	
1991–92	3	Keith Nobbs	Defender	England	53	0	
1994–95	4	Keith Houchen	Forward	England	39	14	
1997–98	4	Micky Barron	Defender	England	37	0	
1998–99	4	Micky Barron	Defender	England	49	0	
1999–2000	4	Paul Stephenson	Midfielder	England	55	6	
2000–01	4	James Sharp	Defender	England	41	2	
2001–02	4	Graeme Lee	Defender	England	44	5	
2002–03	4	Ritchie Humphreys	Midfielder	England	49	11	
2003–04	3	Jim Provett	Goalkeeper	England	52	0	
2004–05	3	Joel Porter	Forward	Australia	52	16	
2005–06	3	Ritchie Humphreys	Midfielder	England	50	2	
2007–08	3	Ritchie Humphreys	Midfielder	England	50	3	
2008–09	3	Joel Porter	Forward	Australia	47	23	
2009–10	3	Neil Austin	Defender	England	41	3	
2010–11	3	Antony Sweeney	Midfielder	England	48	14	
2011–12	3	Paul Murray	Midfielder	England	46	1	
2012–13	3	Scott Flinders	Goalkeeper	England	49	0	
2013–14	4	Luke James	Forward	England	45	16	
2014–15	4	Scott Harrison	Defender	England	37	1	
2015–16	4	Trevor Carson	Goalkeeper	Northern Ireland	38	0	
2016–17	4	No award	–	–	–	–	
2017–18	5	Scott Loach	Goalkeeper	England	49	0	
2018–19	5	Luke James	Forward	England	50	5	
2019–20	5	No award	–	–	–	–	–
2020–21	5	Rhys Oates	Forward	England	41	17	
2021–22	4	Luke Molyneux	Winger	England	55	12	
2022–23	4	No award	–	–	–	–	–
2023–24	5	No award	–	–	–	–	–
2024–25	5	No award	–	–	–	–	–

=== PFA Team of the Year ===
The following players have been included in the PFA Team of the Year whilst playing for Hartlepool United:

- 1989–90 (Scotland) Rob McKinnon
- 1990–91 (England) Joe Allon
- 1997–98 (England) Jon Cullen
- 1999–2000 (England) Tommy Miller
- 2000–01 (England) Tommy Miller
- 2002–03 (England) Graeme Lee, (England) Chris Westwood, (England) Mark Tinkler, (England) Ritchie Humphreys
- 2006–07 (England) Michael Nelson, (England) Ritchie Humphreys, (England) Andy Monkhouse

=== National League Team of the Year ===
The following have been included in the National League Team of the Year whilst playing for Hartlepool United:

- 2020–21 (England) David Ferguson

=== LMA Manager of the Year ===
- League Two Manager of the Year: Danny Wilson, 2006–07

=== North East Team of the Year ===
- Winners: 2002–03

== Other awards ==
=== English Football Hall of Fame ===
Former Hartlepool United players or managers who have been inducted into the English Football Hall of Fame include:

- 2002 (England) Brian Clough
- 2007 (England) Peter Beardsley

=== Manager of the Month ===
- League One
  - Neale Cooper – January 2005
  - Mick Wadsworth – December 2010
  - John Hughes – February 2013
- Third Division / League Two
  - Chris Turner – January 2001
  - Mike Newell – January 2003
  - Danny Wilson – September 2006
  - Danny Wilson – February 2007
  - Danny Wilson - March 2007
  - Colin Cooper – October 2013
- National League
  - Craig Harrison – October 2017
  - Matthew Bates – March 2018

=== Player of the Month ===
- Second Division / League One
  - Adam Boyd – April 2004
  - Adam Boyd – January 2005
  - Sam Collins – December 2010
  - Peter Hartley – February 2013
- League Two
  - Dimitrios Konstantopoulos – December 2006
  - Michael Nelson – January 2007
  - Luke James – October 2013
  - Dan Kemp – February 2023
- National League
  - Gavan Holohan – April 2021
  - Emmanuel Dieseruvwe – August 2023

== See also ==
- Hartlepool United F.C.
- History of Hartlepool United F.C.
- List of Hartlepool United F.C. seasons
- List of Hartlepool United F.C. managers
