= List of Hartlepool United F.C. managers =

Hartlepool United Football Club is an association football club based in Hartlepool, County Durham who currently play in the National League, the fifth level of the English football league system.

This chronological list comprises all those who have held the position of manager of the first team of Hartlepool United. Each manager's entry includes his dates of tenure and the club's overall competitive record (in terms of matches won, drawn and lost), honours won and significant achievements while under his care. Caretaker managers are included, where known, as well as those who have been in permanent charge. The club's current head coach is Lee Clark.

== History ==
Fred Priest, who led the team to second in the North Eastern League in the 1909–10 season, was elected as the club's first manager in August 1908. The club was managed by Cecil Potter when it was named as a founder member of the Football League Third Division North for the 1921–22 season, in which the team finished in 4th position. The club went throughout the period of 1940–43 without a manager due to the Second World War but appointed Fred Westgarth in August 1943. Under the management of Angus McLean, the club won promotion to Division Three from Division Four after finishing in third place in the 1967–68 season.

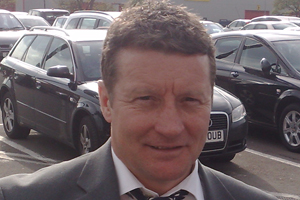
Danny Wilson, who managed Hartlepool United from 2006 to 2008

=== 1980–1997 ===
Following the departure of Bobby Moncur, former England full back Cyril Knowles was appointed in December 1989 with the club struggling in the Fourth Division. Knowles oversaw a successful second half of the season and led the club to a 19th place finish. The club had a strong second half of the season once again in 1990–91 and were in the hunt for promotion. However, Knowles was diagnosed with a brain tumour in March. Following his death in August 1991, the new Clarence Road stand was named after him in his memory. Under caretaker manager Alan Murray, Hartlepool went 14 games unbeaten to secure automatic promotion to the Third Division. In the 1991–92 season, Murray led Hartlepool to a creditable 11th place finish in the third tier. Following the introduction of the Premier League and subsequent restructuring, the third tier was renamed as the Second Division ahead of the 1992–93 season. Hartlepool suffered the departure of several key players but still managed a historic win over Premier League side Crystal Palace in the FA Cup third round.

However, Murray's assistant, Viv Busby was appointed as his successor in February 1993 after a poor run of form. He was appointed amidst a run of 11 matches in the Second Division without a goal, but stabilised the club's form - finishing in 16th. An initial positive beginning to the following season subsided and Busby was consequently dismissed in November 1993 with attendances falling regularly below 2,000. John MacPhail took over from Busby initially in a player-manager role, making 19 league appearances during the 1993–94 season. He was unable to keep Hartlepool in the third tier and was in charge for the club's record home defeat, an 8–1 home defeat to Plymouth Argyle in the final match of the season. A hangover in form into the next season saw the end of MacPhail's tenure in charge. Former player David McCreery returned to the club from Carlisle United as a player-manager in October 1994. During the season, McCreery dropped himself from the lineup in favour of his predecessor MacPhail to focus on his managerial duties. The club ultimately finished the 1994–95 season in 18th position, however, club legend Keith Houchen replaced McCreery late in the season in a player-manager capacity. Chairman Harold Hornsey highlighted that Houchen's budget would be limited. Houchen played 38 league matches in his opening season as the club finished 20th in the Third Division. He retired during the following season. In November 1996, Houchen resigned as manager after a run of seven defeats in eight matches. Mick Tait was appointed as the new manager, he led the club to a 20th place finish in his first season.

=== 1997–2013 ===
The 1997–98 season saw the takeover of IOR which coincided with an improvement in form before a decline in the second half of the season, eventually finishing 17th. The following season followed a similar pattern, with the club's form declining following New Year; eventually leading to the departure of Tait in January 1999.

Chris Turner was appointed manager in February 1999 with the club bottom of the Football League following Mick Tait's departure. He proved to be an instant success at Victoria Park, keeping the club two places and three points ahead of the relegation zone. Turner led Hartlepool to three consecutive play-off finishes. However, they lost on each occasion in the semi-finals. In November 2002, Turner left the club for Sheffield Wednesday with the side sitting top of the league. Mike Newell was tasked with securing promotion which he did, albeit missing out on the title to Rushden & Diamonds. The club let Newell go following promotion to the Second Division. Neale Cooper was appointed ahead of the 2003–04 season. He led the club to a 6th place finish, losing in the play-offs to Bristol City. In the following season, Cooper left the club by mutual consent with the club on the verge of securing a second successive play-off finish. Caretaker manager Martin Scott led Hartlepool into the play-offs where they would lose to Sheffield Wednesday in the play-off final after extra time. Ahead of the 2005–06 season, Scott was named as the permanent manager.

However, the club would suffer a relegation back to the fourth tier (now League Two) at the end of the season. Danny Wilson managed the team to an immediate return to League One, promoted in second place. Wilson was sacked in December 2008, with the team in the bottom half of the table. Chris Turner returned to the role, initially as a caretaker manager. He then led Hartlepool to a 19th-place finish in League One at the end of the 2008–09 season, two places and one point above the relegation zone. On 19 August 2010, Turner resigned from his position at Hartlepool. Following the resignation of Turner, Mick Wadsworth was appointed on an interim basis and led Hartlepool to a 16th place finish. He was appointed on a permanent basis ahead of the 2011–12 season but was dismissed in December 2011 following a run of bad home form.

On 28 December 2011, Neale Cooper returned to the club. Under Cooper, Hartlepool's form stabilised and he guided them to a 13th-place finish in the 2011–12 season, their highest league finish since 2004–05. After a poor run of form at the start of the 2012–13 season, Cooper resigned as Hartlepool boss in late October after a defeat at Bury. John Hughes was appointed as the new manager in the midst of a 20-match-run without a win. Despite an upturn in form that earned him a Manager of the Month award, Hartlepool were relegated to League Two. Hughes publicly stated his desire to remain at the club, but he was sacked on 9 May 2013.

=== 2013–2018 ===
Ahead of the 2013–14 season, Colin Cooper became manager and led the club to a 19th place finish in League Two. Cooper resigned as Hartlepool United manager with the club at the bottom of the League Two table early in the following season. In late October 2014, former player Paul Murray was appointed. However, he was sacked following defeat by non-League club Blyth Spartans in the FA Cup, just six weeks after taking the reins at the League Two club. On 16 December 2014, Ronnie Moore was appointed as the new manager. Hartlepool were at one stage ten points adrift at the bottom of the Football League and looked certain for relegation, but Moore inspired a revival in form, with the team having a four-match winning streak towards the latter stages of the season, which eventually ensured league survival in the penultimate game at home to Exeter City.

On 10 February 2016, Moore left Hartlepool by mutual consent with the club four points above the relegation places. Craig Hignett returned to Hartlepool and led the club to a 16th place finish but departed the club by mutual consent in January 2017 after Hartlepool had won one of their previous nine matches. Dave Jones was announced as the new manager. Jones joined with the North-East club 19th in the table and four points clear of the relegation zone. However, Hartlepool's form deteriorated further, winning only 13 points from a potential 51, and he left the club by mutual consent on 24 April 2017. During Jones' last match in charge of Hartlepool, club president Jeff Stelling urged him to quit, in an impassioned speech on Soccer Saturday, following a home defeat to Barnet which had placed Hartlepool in the bottom two. Matthew Bates was placed in temporary charge for the final two games of the season. Despite Hartlepool winning their final game of the season against Doncaster Rovers, a late goal from Newport consigned Pools to relegation from the Football League for the first time after joining in 1921.

On 26 May 2017, Craig Harrison was appointed as manager of Hartlepool ahead of their first campaign in non-League. Following one victory since late November, Harrison left his position as manager in February 2018. On 21 February 2018, Matthew Bates took temporary charge of Hartlepool again following the dismissal of Harrison.

=== 2018–2025 ===
Bates kept Hartlepool in the division and was appointed as permanent first-team manager in May 2018. Craig Hignett returned to Hartlepool in March 2018 as the club's Director of Football. Following the dismissal of Bates in November 2018 after six successive defeats, Hignett took temporary charge of the first team in addition to his role as director of football. Although Richard Money took charge in December 2018, he was later moved to a senior position before departing and Hignett was reinstated as first-team manager on 23 January 2019. On 10 October 2019, Hignett was sacked.

On 11 November 2019, Challinor was appointed manager of National League side Hartlepool United with the club in 13th place. In his first full season in charge, Challinor guided Hartlepool to a 4th placed finish and a place in the 2020–21 National League play-offs. On 20 June 2021, Hartlepool defeated Torquay United in the 2021 National League play-off final at Ashton Gate Stadium on penalties to return to the Football League. On 24 September 2021, Challinor signed a new three-year contract to remain as manager. On 1 November 2021, Challinor announced his intentions to step down from the position to join National League club Stockport County.

After Challinor left, former defender Graeme Lee was appointed as his successor in December 2021. During his five-month spell as manager, Lee led the team to the semi-finals of the EFL Trophy losing on penalties to Rotherham United and the fourth round of the FA Cup losing away to Premier League side Crystal Palace. However, Lee was dismissed with one game left of the 2021–22 season. It was the downturn in form following the defeat to Rotherham that was citing in Lee losing his job, with the club winning once out of their eleven games following the match.

Ahead of the 2022–23 season, Cove Rangers manager Paul Hartley was appointed as the next permanent manager. During the summer transfer window, Hartley signed 16 new players in a major overhaul of the squad. After a winless first nine league matches, Hartley was sacked by Hartlepool following a poor start to the season, with the club in the relegation zone at the time of his departure. Hartley was replaced by Keith Curle the same day, initially as an interim manager. Curle was given the permanent job in December 2022. However, he was dismissed in February 2023.

John Askey was appointed manager on 23 February 2023, with the club sitting just one point above the relegation zone but having played four more games than 23rd-place Crawley Town. However, he could not prevent Hartlepool from being relegated to the National League. On 30 December 2023, Askey was dismissed following a downturn of form which had left the club in 17th in the National League at the time of his departure. On 20 January 2024, Kevin Phillips was announced as Askey's successor. Having guided Hartlepool to a 12th place finish, Phillips left after his contract expired at the end of the season. On 27 April 2024, Phillips' departure was confirmed after his contract expired. He was replaced the same day by Darren Sarll who lasted until 16 October 2024, before being dismissed as Hartlepool manager after winning 4 of his 15 matches in charge with the club. After working in a caretaker capacity, Lennie Lawrence was appointed as Sarll's successor until the end of the 2024–25 season. On 3 February 2025, Lawrence announced that he had stepped back from his role to allow head coach Anthony Limbrick to take over as manager. On 12 June 2025, Limbrick left the club. He was replaced by Simon Grayson on the same day. Despite a positive start to the 2025–26 season, Hartlepool suffered a run of one win in 11 games in all competitions and Grayson was dismissed on 12 October following a 1–1 away draw with seventh tier side Gainsborough Trinity in the FA Cup fourth qualifying round. He departed after 14 league games with four wins, six draws and four defeats.

Long-serving player Nicky Featherstone, was appointed interim manager following Grayson's dismissal. After guiding Hartlepool to a seven game unbeaten run in the league, he was appointed permanent manager on 5 December. He guided them to a 9th place finish in a season which saw a change of ownership from Raj Singh to American businessman Landon Smith. Singh's tenure saw a high turnover of managers with 14 managerial changes during a near eight year ownership.

=== 2025–present ===
On 17 April 2026, it was announced that, following a comprehensive review of the club's football operations, Featherstone was to step down from his position as manager following the conclusion of the 2025–26 season. Ahead of the 2026–27 season, Lee Clark was appointed as the new head coach.

== Key ==
- All first-team matches in national competition are counted, except the abandoned 1939–40 Football League season and matches in wartime leagues and cups.
- Names of caretaker (or interim) managers are supplied where known, and periods of caretaker-management are highlighted in italics and marked †. Win percentage is rounded to one decimal place.
- P = matches played; W = matches won; D = matches drawn; L = matches lost; Win % = win percentage
- Statistics are complete up to and including the match played on 19 September 2026.

== Managers ==
Table of managers, including tenure, record and honours
Name	Nationality	From	To	Record					Honours	Ref.
Name	Nationality	From	To	P	W	D	L	Win %	Honours	Ref.
Fred Priest	England	1 August 1908	31 May 1912	145	69	37	39	47.6	-	
Percy Humphreys	England	1 August 1912	31 May 1913	43	19	6	18	44.2	-	
Jack Manners	England	1 August 1913	1 May 1920	133	55	33	45	41.4	-	
Cecil Potter	England	1 May 1920	1 July 1922	38	17	8	13	44.7	-	
David Gordon	Scotland	19 July 1922	16 February 1924	80	17	23	40	21.3	-	
Jack Manners	England	16 June 1924	31 May 1927	132	44	28	60	33.3	-	
Bill Norman	England	29 July 1927	16 September 1931	177	56	32	89	31.6	-	
Jack Carr	England	1 April 1932	1 April 1935	132	53	22	57	40.2	-	
Jimmy Hamilton	England	1 July 1935	30 July 1940	182	61	43	78	33.5	-	
Fred Westgarth	England	1 August 1943	1 February 1957	510	207	99	204	40.6	-	
Ray Middleton	England	1 May 1957	20 November 1959	116	38	26	52	32.8	-	
Bill Robinson	England	1 July 1959	30 June 1962	125	27	24	74	21.6	-	
Allenby Chilton	England	1 July 1962	1 April 1963	34	5	6	23	14.7	-	
Bob Gurney	England	1 April 1963	6 January 1964	44	9	10	25	20.5	-	
Alvan Williams	Wales	6 January 1964	31 May 1965	63	20	17	26	31.7	-	
Geoff Twentyman	England	1 June 1965	29 October 1965	8	3	1	4	37.5	-	
Brian Clough	England	29 October 1965	5 June 1967	84	35	13	36	41.7	-	
Angus McLean	Wales	5 June 1967	24 April 1970	139	45	40	54	32.4	Division Four promotion: 1967–68	
John Simpson	England	24 April 1970	1 March 1971	31	5	9	17	16.1	-	
Len Ashurst	England	1 March 1971	1 June 1974	155	48	38	69	31.0	-	
Ken Hale	England	1 June 1974	1 October 1976	101	33	25	43	32.7	-	
Billy Horner	England	1 October 1976	31 March 1983	307	95	77	135	30.9	-	
John Duncan	Scotland	1 April 1983	1 June 1983	9	3	1	5	33.3	-	
Mick Docherty	England	14 June 1983	15 December 1983	18	1	5	12	5.6	-	
Billy Horner	England	15 December 1983	1 November 1986	94	30	21	43	31.9	-	
John Bird	England	1 October 1986	3 October 1988	94	32	27	35	34.0	-	
Bobby Moncur	Scotland	2 November 1988	27 November 1989	58	14	14	30	24.1	-	
Cyril Knowles	England	9 December 1989	4 March 1991	85	40	18	27	47.1	-	
Alan Murray	England	5 March 1991	15 February 1993	90	36	23	31	40.0	Division Four promotion: 1990–91	
Viv Busby	England	15 February 1993	24 November 1993	40	9	9	22	22.5	-	
John MacPhail	Scotland	24 November 1993	1 September 1994	36	7	6	23	19.4	-	
David McCreery	Northern Ireland	9 September 1994	20 April 1995	44	10	10	24	22.7	-	
Keith Houchen	England	20 April 1995	4 November 1996	73	19	17	37	26.0	-	
Mick Tait	England	4 November 1996	18 January 1999	115	33	37	45	28.7	-	
Paul Baker; Brian Honour †	England	18 January 1999	24 February 1999	7	2	1	4	28.6	-	
Chris Turner	England	24 February 1999	7 November 2002	195	82	49	64	42.1	-	
Colin West †	England	7 November 2002	21 November 2002	2	1	1	0	50.0	-	
Mike Newell	England	21 November 2002	31 May 2003	35	16	8	11	45.7	Division Three runner-up: 2002–03	
Neale Cooper	Scotland	28 June 2003	4 May 2005	110	48	26	36	43.6	-	
Martin Scott	England	4 May 2005	28 January 2006	39	11	10	18	28.2	-	
Paul Stephenson †	England	2 February 2006	13 June 2006	15	3	7	5	20.0	-	
Danny Wilson	Northern Ireland	13 June 2006	15 December 2008	133	58	29	46	43.6	League Two runner-up: 2006–07	
Chris Turner	England	15 December 2008	19 August 2010	81	23	19	39	28.4	-	
Mick Wadsworth	England	19 August 2010	6 December 2011	74	26	17	31	35.1	-	
Micky Barron †	England	6 December 2011	28 December 2011	3	1	0	2	33.3	-	
Neale Cooper	Scotland	28 December 2011	24 October 2012	40	7	14	19	17.5	-	
Micky Barron †	England	24 October 2012	12 November 2012	4	0	1	3	0.0	-	
John Hughes	Scotland	13 November 2012	9 May 2013	16	5	4	7	31.3	-	
Colin Cooper	England	24 May 2013	4 October 2014	65	19	14	32	29.2	-	
Sam Collins †	England	4 October 2014	23 October 2014	5	1	0	4	20.0	-	
Paul Murray	England	23 October 2014	5 December 2014	7	1	1	5	14.3	-	
Sam Collins †	England	9 December 2014	16 December 2014	1	0	0	1	0.0	-	
Ronnie Moore	England	16 December 2014	10 February 2016	59	19	11	29	32.2	-	
Craig Hignett	England	10 February 2016	15 January 2017	52	15	12	25	28.8	-	
Sam Collins †	England	15 January 2017	23 January 2017	1	1	0	0	100.0	-	
Dave Jones	England	23 January 2017	24 April 2017	17	3	4	10	17.6	-	
Matthew Bates †	England	24 April 2017	26 May 2017	2	1	0	1	50.0	-	
Craig Harrison	England	26 May 2017	21 February 2018	36	10	10	16	27.8	-	
Matthew Bates	England	21 February 2018	28 November 2018	38	13	12	13	34.2	-	
Craig Hignett †	England	29 November 2018	11 December 2018	2	1	0	1	50.0	-	
Richard Money	England	11 December 2018	23 January 2019	8	2	2	4	25.0	-	
Craig Hignett	England	23 January 2019	10 October 2019	32	11	10	11	34.4	-	
Antony Sweeney †	England	10 October 2019	11 November 2019	5	3	1	1	60.0	-	
Dave Challinor	England	11 November 2019	1 November 2021	90	41	24	25	45.6	National League play-offs: 2021	
Antony Sweeney †	England	1 November 2021	1 December 2021	8	3	1	4	37.5	-	
Graeme Lee	England	1 December 2021	5 May 2022	32	10	12	10	31.3	-	
Michael Nelson; Antony Sweeney †	England	5 May 2022	3 June 2022	1	0	0	1	0.0	-	
Paul Hartley	Scotland	3 June 2022	18 September 2022	11	1	4	6	9.1	-	
Antony Sweeney †	England	18 September 2022	21 September 2022	1	0	1	0	0.0	-	
Keith Curle	England	21 September 2022	22 February 2023	29	7	7	15	24.1	-	
John Askey	England	23 February 2023	30 December 2023	41	12	11	18	29.3	-	
Lennie Lawrence †	England	3 January 2024	23 January 2024	5	2	1	2	40.0	-	
Kevin Phillips	England	24 January 2024	27 April 2024	16	7	5	4	43.8	-	
Darren Sarll	England	27 April 2024	16 October 2024	15	4	5	6	26.7	-	
Lennie Lawrence	England	16 October 2024	3 February 2025	16	5	8	3	31.3	-	
Anthony Limbrick	Australia	3 February 2025	12 June 2025	17	5	6	6	29.4	-	
Simon Grayson	England	12 June 2025	12 October 2025	15	4	7	4	26.7	-	
Nicky Featherstone	England	12 October 2025	25 April 2026	34	14	8	12	41.2	-	
Lee Clark	England	14 May 2026	19 September 2026	9	3	0	6	33.3	-	
Adam Clayton; Gary Liddle †	England	21 September 2026	Present	0	0	0	0	0.0	-	
