= List of Hartlepool United F.C. seasons =

Hartlepool United Football Club is an English association football club based in the town of Hartlepool, County Durham. The club was founded in 1908, and its first team played in the North-Eastern League from then until 1921, when the Football League formed a new Third Division based in the north of England. Hartlepool have never played above the third tier of English football, nor have they won a divisional title, but they remained a member of the Football League for 89 consecutive seasons before relegation to the National League in 2017. They hold the record for applications for re-election, with fourteen – three to the Third Division North and a divisional record eleven to the Fourth Division – and all fourteen were successful. Their highest league placing was second in the Third Division North in 1956–57 – only the champions were promoted – but a year later, they were placed in the Fourth Division when the regionalised third tiers were merged into nationwide third and fourth tiers. Since that restructure, their highest league finish has been sixth in the third tier, in 2003–04 and 2004–05; on the latter occasion, they reached the play-off final but lost out to Sheffield Wednesday. They were relegated from the Football League for the first time in 2016–17. They reached the last 32 of the FA Cup for the first time in 1954–55, and have matched that performance six times since, most recently in 2021–22. In the Football League Cup, their best performance was to reach the last 16 in 1975–76.

== History ==
After West Hartlepool R.F.C. folded in 1908, a professional association football club was founded to play at their ground; the board of directors, which included former members of the rugby club committee, named the club Hartlepools United, with the aim of attracting spectators not only from West Hartlepool but also from the nearby town of Hartlepool. In their first season, they won the major regional trophy, the Durham Challenge Cup – and retained it the following year – as well as entering the FA Cup, in which they were drawn to play the local amateur club, West Hartlepool F.C., with whom they shared the Victoria Ground. Hartlepool won 2–1 in the first qualifying round only to go out in the second, beaten by South Bank after a replay. They also entered the North-Eastern League, finished fourth in their initial season, and remained members of that league until 1920–21; their best season was 1910–11, when they finished third. In 1921, the Football League agreed to form a Northern Section of the Third Division to complement the existing Third Division which contained only southern-based teams. Hartlepool were among the 18 applicants accepted as members, and began their Football League career with a fourth-place finish in the 1921–22 season.

Two seasons later, Hartlepool came 21st in the table, so were obliged to apply for re-election to the League; they and bottom club Barrow were elected unopposed. (Note: The League's Management Committee recommended to the Annual General Meeting that the existing members, Hartlepool and Barrow, be re-elected "in order that the original members of our section shall given plenty of opportunity to stabilise their financial condition consequent upon expenditure necessary in order to obtain election to the League." As a result, applications from Llanelly, Mansfield Town and Pontypridd were not considered.) In the 1935–36 season, the club reached the third round of the FA Cup for the first time. Drawn against Grimsby Town, they held the First Division club to a goalless draw despite playing most of the match with forward Dick Hardy replacing the concussed Jackie Mittell in goal, but lost the replay. By the time the Second World War put a temporary end to competitive football, they had spent 18 consecutive seasons in the Northern Section, courtesy of two more successful applications for re-election.

In the mid-1950s, Hartlepool enjoyed improved performances in both league and cup competition. In the FA Cup, they reached the fourth round for the first time in 1954–55, losing to Nottingham Forest in a replay after extra time. The following season, they lost 1–0 to reigning League champions Chelsea in the third round, and at the same stage of the 1956–57 competition, in front of a record Victoria Ground attendance of 17,426, they came back from 3–0 down with top scorer Ken Johnson struggling with injury to equalise against Manchester United's "Busby Babes" before the top-flight club found a late winner. Those three league seasons brought top-six finishes, culminating in what remains the club's record high of second place in 1956–57 – only the champions were promoted. They dropped into the bottom six in 1958, which meant they were placed in the Fourth Division when the regional sections were merged into nationwide third and fourth tiers. Hartlepool did not fare well in the fourth tier. After five consecutive applications for re-election and with the club in financial difficulties, they appointed the 30-year-old Brian Clough in October 1965 to his first managerial role. He and assistant Peter Taylor, aided by a change of chairmanship, built a team that finished eighth in 1966–67. Although Clough and Taylor then left for Derby County, the team maintained their form, finished third, and won promotion for the first time in the club's history in 1967–68. To better represent the new borough formed by the recent amalgamation of the adjacent boroughs of Hartlepool and West Hartlepool, the board decided the club needed a new name.

Hartlepool Association Football Club's foray into the Third Division lasted just one season, and after nine years, three re-elections and a £10,000 loan from the local council to keep the club afloat, the name was changed again, to Hartlepool United. In 1977–78, the first season under that name, the team reached the fourth round of the FA Cup again; despite progressing to the same stage five times since, most recently in 2021–22, they have yet to play in the fifth round. By the time automatic promotion and relegation between the Football Conference and the League was introduced in 1986–87, Hartlepool had made a record eleven applications for re-election to the Fourth Division, which added to the three in the pre-war Northern Section made fourteen, also a league record, all of which had been successful. They remained in the fourth tier until Joe Allon's 28 goals helped them gain promotion via a third-place finish. This time their stay lasted three seasons.

Three consecutive defeats in the semi-finals of the play-offs preceded promotion as 2002–03 Third Division runners-up – when the Premier League broke away in 1992, the Football League's divisions were renumbered upwards. Hartlepool then achieved their highest finishing position since the introduction of the four-division structure, coming sixth in the third tier in both 2003–04 and 2004–05. On the latter occasion, they reached the play-off final but lost out to Sheffield Wednesday. Relegated in 2006, they bounced straight back as runners-up in what was by then League Two, and spent six years at the higher level. They came close to automatic relegation in 2014–15, but two years later, they were relegated from the Football League for the first time after a continuous membership of 89 playing seasons. Needing to win their final match of the season and hope Newport County did not, Hartlepool came from behind to beat title-chasing Doncaster Rovers but Newport produced an 89th-minute winner to secure their own safety at Hartlepool's expense. After four years, they returned to the Football League via the play-offs, defeating Torquay United in the 2021 play-off final. However, the club were relegated back to the National League after only two seasons in the fourth tier.

Since their admission to the Football League in 1921, the team have spent 43 seasons in the third tier of the English football league system, 48 in the fourth, and 7 in the fifth, as of the end of the 2025–26 season. The table details the team's achievements and the top goalscorer in senior first-team competitions from their debut season in the North-Eastern League and FA Cup in 1908–09 to the end of the most recently completed season.

== Key ==
Key to league record:

- P – Played
- W – Games won
- D – Games drawn
- L – Games lost
- F – Goals for
- A – Goals against
- Pts – Points
- Pos – Final position

Key to colours and symbols:

1st or W	Winners
2nd or F	Runners-up
↑	Promoted
↓	Relegated
♦	Top league scorer in Hartlepool's division

Key to divisions:

- NEL – North Eastern League
- Div 3N – Football League Third Division North
- Div 3 – Football League Third Division
- Div 4 – Football League Fourth Division
- League 1 – Football League One
- League 2 – Football League Two, EFL League Two
- National – National League

Key to stages of competitions:

- Group – Group stage
- Prelim – Preliminary round
- QR1 – First qualifying round
- QR2 – Second qualifying round, etc.
- R1 – First round, etc.
- R2 – Second round, etc.
- QF – Quarter-final
- SF – Semi-final
- F – Runners-up
- W – Winners
- (N) – Northern section of regionalised stage

Details of the abandoned 1939–40 Football League season are shown in italics and appropriately footnoted.

== Seasons ==
-
Season	League									FA Cup (Note: Beginning with the 1925–26 season, the FA Cup was structured so that the third round proper contained 64 teams. Prior to that date, the structure had varied, so rounds are not directly comparable to the round of the same name after 1925.)	League Cup (Note: The Football League Cup competition started in the 1960–61 season.)	Other		Top scorer(s) (Note: Includes goals scored in all nationally organised competitions, i.e. the Football League, including play-offs, FA Cup, National League and play-offs, League Cup, Football League Group Cup, EFL Trophy and predecessors, and Third Division North Cup, as well as goals scored in the North-Eastern League before Hartlepool's admission to the Football League. For seasons from 1908–09 to 2009–10, sourced to PoolStats and/or In The Mad Crowd; for non-League seasons thereafter, sourced to In The Mad Crowd; for Football League seasons thereafter, sourced to Soccerbase.)	
Season	Division (Note: From the 1921–22 Football League season onwards, divisions are sorted according to their level within the English football league system, and separately from the pre-Football League division.)	P	W	D	L	F	A	Pts	Pos	FA Cup	League Cup	Competition	Result	Name	Goals
1908–09	NEL	34	16	9	9	79	51	41	4th	QR2	—	Durham CC	W	Joshie Fletcher	27
1909–10	NEL	32	18	10	4	82	23	46	4th	QR2	—	Durham CC	W	Joshie Fletcher	27
1910–11	NEL	34	18	8	8	71	39	44	3rd	QR1	—	Durham CC	F	Joshie Fletcher	19
1911–12	NEL	36	14	8	14	66	50	26	10th	QR4	—	Durham CC	R2	Joshie Fletcher	21
1912–13	NEL	38	15	6	17	69	99	36	12th	QR5	—	Durham CC; North Riding SC	R2; R2	Joshie Fletcher	17
1913–14	NEL	38	17	10	11	68	37	44	7th	QR4	—	Durham CC; North Riding SC	SF; R1	John Smith	28
1914–15	NEL	38	16	11	11	74	57	43	7th	QR5	—	Durham CC; North Riding SC	R2; F	Reuben Butler	25
1915–19	Competitive league and FA Cup football was suspended until after the First World War.														
1919–20	NEL	34	12	10	12	65	36	34	9th	QR4	—	Durham CC	R2	Chuck Hewitt	14
1920–21	NEL	38	18	6	14	64	39	42	7th	QR6	—	Durham CC	F	Jimmy Lister	24
1921–22	Div 3N	38	17	8	13	52	39	42	4th	R1	—	—	—	Peter Robertson	12
1922–23	Div 3N	38	10	12	16	48	54	32	15th	QR6	—	—	—	Cecil Hardy	11
1923–24	Div 3N	42	7	11	24	33	70	25	21st	QR6	—	—	—	Billy Smith	18
1924–25	Div 3N	42	12	11	19	45	63	35	20th	R1	—	—	—	Billy Smith	12
1925–26	Div 3N	42	18	8	16	82	73	44	6th	R1	—	—	—	Harry Wensley	22
1926–27	Div 3N	42	14	6	22	66	81	34	17th	R1	—	—	—	Harry Wensley	16
1927–28	Div 3N	42	16	6	20	69	81	38	15th	R1	—	—	—	Billy Robinson	28
1928–29	Div 3N	42	10	6	26	59	112	26	21st	R1	—	—	—	Ginger Richardson	19
1929–30	Div 3N	42	17	11	14	81	74	45	8th	R1	—	—	—	Albert Pape	21
1930–31	Div 3N	42	12	6	24	67	86	30	20th	R1	—	—	—	Harry Simmons	17
1931–32	Div 3N	40	16	5	19	78	100	37	13th	R1	—	—	—	Syd Lumley	18
1932–33	Div 3N	42	16	7	19	87	116	39	14th	R2	—	—	—	Joss Hewitt	24
1933–34	Div 3N	42	16	7	19	89	93	39	11th	R2	—	Third Division North Cup	R1	Joss Hewitt	21
1934–35	Div 3N	42	17	7	18	80	78	41	12th	R2	—	Third Division North Cup	SF	Duncan Lindsay	25
1935–36	Div 3N	42	15	12	15	57	61	42	8th	R3	—	Third Division North Cup	R1	Johnny Wigham	19
1936–37	Div 3N	42	19	7	16	75	69	45	6th	R2	—	Third Division North Cup	R2	Sam English	20
1937–38	Div 3N	42	10	12	20	53	80	32	20th	R2	—	Third Division North Cup	R2	Sam English	11
1938–39	Div 3N	42	12	7	23	55	94	31	21st	R2	—	Third Division North Cup	SF	Tommy McGarry	14
1939–40	Div 3N	3	0	2	1	1	4	2	— (Note: The 1939–40 Football League season was abandoned with three matches played when the Second World War began.)	—	—	—	—	Joe Mantle	1
1939–45	The Football League and FA Cup were suspended until after the Second World War.														
1945–46	—	—	—	—	—	—	—	—	—	R1 (Note: Although the Football League did not resume until the 1946–47 season, the FA Cup was contested in 1945–46. From the first round proper to the sixth round (quarter-final), results were determined on aggregate score over two legs.)	—	—	—	Hughie McMahon	2
1946–47	Div 3N	42	15	9	18	64	73	39	13th	R2	—	—	—	Sammy Scott	14
1947–48	Div 3N	42	14	8	20	51	73	36	19th	R2	—	—	—	Jimmy Isaac	9
1948–49	Div 3N	42	14	10	18	45	58	38	16th	R1	—	—	—	Fred Richardson	9
1949–50	Div 3N	42	14	5	23	52	79	33	18th	R2	—	—	—	Les Owens	13
1950–51	Div 3N	46	16	7	23	64	66	39	16th	R2	—	—	—	Eric Wildon	27
1951–52	Div 3N	46	21	8	17	71	65	50	9th	R3	—	—	—	Eric Wildon	19
1952–53	Div 3N	46	16	14	16	57	61	46	17th	R2	—	—	—	Alex Elder; Eric Wildon	11
1953–54	Div 3N	46	13	14	19	59	65	40	18th	R3	—	—	—	Eric Wildon	16
1954–55	Div 3N	46	25	5	16	64	49	55	5th	R4	—	—	—	Tommy McGuigan	20
1955–56	Div 3N	46	26	5	15	81	60	57	4th	R3	—	—	—	George Luke	22
1956–57	Div 3N	46	25	9	12	90	63	59	2nd (Note: Club's best League finishing position before the regional sections of the Third Division were amalgamated into national Third and Fourth Divisions.)	R3	—	—	—	Ken Johnson	26
1957–58	Div 3N	46	16	12	18	73	76	44	17th	R2	—	—	—	Peter Thompson	20
1958–59	Div 4 (Note: Hartlepool were placed in the Football League Fourth Division when the regional sections of the Third Division were amalgamated into national Third and Fourth Divisions.)	46	15	10	21	74	88	40	19th	R2	—	—	—	George Luke	13
1959–60	Div 4	46	10	7	29	59	109	27	24th	R1	—	—	—	Harry Clark	21
1960–61	Div 4	46	12	8	26	71	103	32	23rd	R1	R1	—	—	Ken Johnson	13
1961–62	Div 4	44	8	11	25	52	101	27	22nd	R3	R1	—	—	Johnny Edgar	20
1962–63	Div 4	46	7	11	28	56	104	25	24th	R1	R1	—	—	Johnny Edgar; Derek McLean	11
1963–64	Div 4	46	12	9	25	54	93	33	23rd	R1	R1	—	—	Peter Thompson	8
1964–65	Div 4	46	15	13	18	61	85	43	15th	R2	R1	—	—	Peter Thompson	16
1965–66	Div 4	46	16	8	22	63	75	40	18th	R3	R2	—	—	Ernie Phythian	17
1966–67	Div 4	46	22	7	17	66	64	51	8th	R1	R1	—	—	Ernie Phythian (Note: Phythian was top scorer in the 1966–67 Fourth Division with 23 goals.)	26 ♦
1967–68	Div 4 ↑	46	25	10	11	60	46	60	3rd (Note: Promoted to the Football League Third Division by virtue of finishing in third place. This was the first promotion in the club's history.)	R1	R2	—	—	Terry Bell	15
1968–69	Div 3 ↓	46	10	19	17	40	70	39	22nd	R1	R1	—	—	Peter Blowman	8
1969–70	Div 4	46	10	10	26	42	82	30	23rd	R2	R2	—	—	Terry Bell	15
1970–71	Div 4	46	8	12	26	34	74	28	23rd	R1	R1	—	—	Nick Sharkey	9
1971–72	Div 4	46	17	6	23	58	69	40	18th	R2	R1	—	—	Ron Young	20
1972–73	Div 4	46	12	17	17	34	49	41	20th	R1	R1	—	—	John Coyne	11
1973–74	Div 4	46	16	12	18	48	47	44	11th	R1	R2	—	—	Allan Gauden	14
1974–75	Div 4	46	16	11	19	52	62	43	13th	R2	R4	—	—	Malcolm Moore	19
1975–76	Div 4	46	16	10	20	62	78	42	14th	R3	R1	—	—	Malcolm Moore	16
1976–77	Div 4	46	10	12	24	47	73	32	22nd	R1	R1	—	—	Malcolm Poskett	10
1977–78	Div 4	46	15	7	24	51	84	37	21st	R4	R1	—	—	Billy Ayre	13
1978–79	Div 4	46	13	18	15	57	66	44	13th	R3	R1	—	—	Keith Houchen	13
1979–80	Div 4	46	14	10	22	59	64	38	19th	R1	R1	—	—	Keith Houchen	15
1980–81	Div 4	46	20	9	17	64	61	49	9th	R1	R1	—	—	Keith Houchen	17
1981–82	Div 4	46	13	16	17	73	84	55 (Note: The 1981–82 season saw the introduction of three points for a win instead of two.)	14th	R2	R1	Football League Group Cup	Group	Keith Houchen; Bob Newton	18
1982–83	Div 4	46	13	9	24	46	76	48	22nd	R2	R2	Football League Group Cup	Group	Paul Dobson	9
1983–84	Div 4	46	10	10	26	47	85	40	23rd	R1	R1	Associate Members' Cup	R1(N)	Paul Dobson	13
1984–85	Div 4	46	14	10	22	54	67	52	19th	R2	R1	Associate Members' Cup	R1(N)	Kevin Dixon	13
1985–86	Div 4	46	20	10	16	68	67	70	7th	R2	R1	Associate Members' Cup	Prelim(N)	Alan Shoulder	19
1986–87	Div 4	46	11	18	17	44	65	51	18th	R1	R1	Associate Members' Cup	Prelim(N)	Kevin Dixon	9
1987–88	Div 4	46	15	14	17	50	57	59	16th	R3	R1	Associate Members' Cup	SF(N)	Paul Baker	25
1988–89	Div 4	46	14	10	22	50	78	52	19th	R4	R1	Associate Members' Cup	Prelim(N)	Simon Grayson	13
1989–90	Div 4	42	15	10	21	66	88	55	19th	R2	R1	Associate Members' Cup	Prelim(N)	Joe Allon; Paul Baker	17
1990–91	Div 4 ↑	46	24	10	12	67	48	82	3rd	R2	R2	Associate Members' Cup	R1(N)	Joe Allon (Note: The Rec.Sport.Soccer Statistics Foundation (RSSSF) erroneously lists Allon as joint top scorer in the 1990–91 Fourth Division with 35 goals, but only 28 of those were scored in the league.)	35
1991–92	Div 3	46	18	11	17	57	57	65	11th	R3	R2	Associate Members' Cup	QF(N)	Paul Baker	18
1992–93	Div 2 (Note: The newly formed FA Premier League split from the Football League, and the remaining divisions of the Football League were renumbered upwards.)	46	14	12	20	42	60	54	16th	R4	R2	Football League Trophy	R2(N)	Andy Saville	20
1993–94	Div 2 ↓	46	9	9	28	41	87	36	23rd	R1	R1	Football League Trophy	R1(N)	Nicky Southall	10
1994–95	Div 3	42	11	10	21	43	69	43	18th	R1	R2	Football League Trophy	R1(N)	Keith Houchen	14
1995–96	Div 3	46	12	13	21	47	67	49	20th	R1	R2	Football League Trophy	R1(N)	Joe Allon; Steve Howard	9
1996–97	Div 3	46	14	9	23	53	66	51	20th	R1	R1	Football League Trophy	R1(N)	Joe Allon	11
1997–98	Div 3	46	12	23	11	61	53	59	17th	R1	R1	Football League Trophy	R2(N)	Jon Cullen	12
1998–99	Div 3	46	13	12	21	52	65	51	22nd	R2	R1	Football League Trophy	QF(N)	Chris Beech	9
1999–2000	Div 3	46	21	9	16	60	49	72	7th (Note: Lost 3–0 on aggregate to local rivals Darlington in play-off semi-final.)	R2	R1	Football League Trophy	QF(N)	Tommy Miller	16
2000–01	Div 3	46	21	14	11	71	54	77	4th (Note: Lost 5–1 on aggregate in to Blackpool play-off semi-final.)	R1	R1	Football League Trophy	QF(N)	Tommy Miller	20
2001–02	Div 3	46	20	11	15	74	48	71	7th (Note: Lost on penalties to Cheltenham Town in play-off semi-final.)	R1	R1	Football League Trophy	R1(N)	Gordon Watson	18
2002–03	Div 3 ↑	46	24	13	9	71	51	85	2nd	R1	R1	Football League Trophy	R1(N)	Eifion Williams	16
2003–04	Div 2	46	20	13	13	76	61	73	6th (Note: Club's joint-best League finishing position since the introduction of the four-division structure.) (Note: Lost 3–2 on aggregate to Bristol City in play-off semi-final.)	R3	R2	Football League Trophy	R1(N)	Eifion Williams	14
2004–05	League 1	46	21	8	17	76	66	71	6th (Note: After beating Tranmere Rovers on penalties in play-off semi-final, lost 4–2 after extra time to Sheffield Wednesday in 2005 Football League One play-off final at the Millennium Stadium.)	R4	R2	Football League Trophy	QF(N)	Adam Boyd	29
2005–06	League 1 ↓	46	11	17	18	44	59	50	21st	R2	R2	Football League Trophy	R1(N)	Michael Proctor; Eifion Williams	7
2006–07	League 2 ↑	46	26	10	10	65	40	88	2nd	R2	R2	Football League Trophy	R2(N)	Richie Barker (Note: Barker was top scorer in the 2006–07 League Two season with 21 goals, of which 12 were scored for Mansfield Town before he joined Hartlepool.); Jon Daly	9
2007–08	League 1	46	15	9	22	63	66	54	15th	R2	R2	Football League Trophy	QF(N)	Richie Barker	16
2008–09	League 1	46	13	11	22	66	79	50	19th	R4	R3	Football League Trophy	R1(N)	Joel Porter	23
2009–10	League 1	46	14	11	21	59	67	50 (Note: Three points deducted for fielding an ineligible player.)	20th	R1	R2	Football League Trophy	R2(N)	Andy Monkhouse	11
2010–11	League 1	46	15	12	19	47	65	57	16th	R3	R2	Football League Trophy	QF(N)	Antony Sweeney	14
2011–12	League 1	46	14	14	18	50	55	56	13th	R1	R1	Football League Trophy	R1(N)	Antony Sweeney	9
2012–13	League 1 ↓	46	9	14	23	39	67	41	23rd	R1	R1	Football League Trophy	R2(N)	Andy Monkhouse	7
2013–14	League 2	46	14	11	21	50	56	53	19th	R2	R1	Football League Trophy	QF(N)	Luke James	16
2014–15	League 2	46	12	9	25	39	70	45	22nd	R2	R1	Football League Trophy	R2(N)	Scott Fenwick; Jonathan Franks	6
2015–16	League 2	46	15	6	25	49	72	51	16th	R3	R2	Football League Trophy	R1(N)	Billy Paynter	15
2016–17	League 2 ↓	46	11	13	12	54	75	46	23rd	R2	R1	EFL Trophy	R1(N)	Pádraig Amond	14
2017–18	National	46	14	14	18	53	63	56	15th	R1	—	FA Trophy	R1	Michael Woods	11
2018–19	National	46	15	14	17	56	62	59	16th	R1	—	FA Trophy	R2	Liam Noble	13
2019–20	National	39	14	13	12	56	50	55	12th (Note: The 2019–20 football season was disrupted by the effects of the COVID-19 pandemic. The National League was suspended in mid-March 2020 and the clubs voted six weeks later to end the regular season programme. Teams had not all played the same number of matches, so it was agreed to construct final league tables on an unweighted points per game basis. Hartlepool United placed twelfth.)	R3	—	FA Trophy	R1	Gime Touré	13
2020–21	National ↑	42	22	10	10	66	43	76	4th (Note: Beat Bromley 3–2 in the play-off quarter-final and Stockport County 1–0 in the semi-final. In the 2021 National League play-off final, played at Ashton Gate, Bristol, because Wembley Stadium was in use for the delayed UEFA Euro 2020, Hartlepool led from the 35th minute, but Torquay United goalkeeper Lucas Covolan headed an equaliser five minutes into stoppage time. The score remained 1–1 until the end of extra time, and Hartlepool won the penalty shootout 5–4.)	R1	—	FA Trophy	R3	Rhys Oates	17
2021–22	League 2	46	14	12	20	44	64	54	17th	R4	R1	EFL Trophy	SF	Luke Molyneux	12
2022–23	League 2 ↓	46	9	16	21	52	78	43	23rd	R3	R1	EFL Trophy	Group	Josh Umerah	15
2023–24	National	46	17	9	20	70	82	60	12th	QR4	—	FA Trophy	R4	Emmanuel Dieseruvwe	25
2024–25	National	46	14	18	14	59	62	60	11th	QR4	—	FA Trophy	R3	Emmanuel Dieseruvwe	17
2025–26	National	46	18	14	14	54	59	68	9th	QR4	—	FA Trophy	R3	Alex Reid	12

== Sources ==
- Errington, Malcolm (2012). Hartlepool United: The Complete Record. Derby: DB Publishing. ISBN 978-1-78091-030-7.
