= History of Hartlepool United F.C. =

History of an English football club

Chart of yearly table positions of Hartlepool in the Football League.

Hartlepool United Football Club is a professional association football club based in Hartlepool, County Durham, England.

Founded in 1908 as The Hartlepools United Football & Athletic Club Company Ltd, the club initially joined the North Eastern League. In 1921, Hartlepools joined the Football League and the newly-formed Third Division North. After several cup runs in the 1950s, Hartlepools were eventually placed in the new Fourth Division in 1958 after 37 years in the Third Division North. In 1968, the club earned promotion for the first time and changed its name to Hartlepool. After only one season in the Third Division, Hartlepool would spend 22 years in the Fourth Division where they would endure several re-elections and financial difficulties. In 1977, the club changed its name again to the current format Hartlepool United. Hartlepool won promotion to the Third Division in 1991. After relegation in 1994, Hartlepool were bought by IOR Ltd in 1997. After three consecutive play-off defeats, Hartlepool were promoted as runners-up in 2003. In the third tier, Hartlepool reached the play-offs in their first two years, losing the play-off final in the second year to Sheffield Wednesday. Hartlepool were relegated the season after, before gaining an automatic return to League One in 2007. Pools would spend six years in League One before relegation in 2013. In 2017, Hartlepool were relegated out of the Football League for the first time after 89 years of consecutive membership. In non-League, Hartlepool narrowly avoided liquidation in 2018 but gained promotion back to the Football League via the play-offs in 2021. They only spent two seasons in League Two after relegation in 2023.

== 1908–1946: Early years and formation ==
Hartlepool's origins can be traced back to 1881 when West Hartlepool Amateur Football Club were founded, later joining as founder members of the Durham FA in 1883. In 1889, West Hartlepool subsequently joined the new Northern League before winning the FA Amateur Cup in 1905, beating Clapton 3–2.

Partly as a result of this victory, the opportunity for a professional team arose in 1908, when West Hartlepool Rugby Club went bust, leaving their stadium, the Victoria Ground vacant. The stadium was bought and the current club was founded under the name The Hartlepools United Football & Athletic Club Company Ltd on 1 June 1908, representing both the town of West Hartlepool and the original settlement of Hartlepool, known locally as "Old Hartlepool". On 2 September 1908, Hartlepools played their first match at Victoria Park, defeating Newcastle United 6–0. In their first season, they won the major regional trophy, the Durham Challenge Cup and retained it the following year as well as entering the FA Cup, in which they were drawn to play the local amateur club, West Hartlepool, with whom they shared the Victoria Ground. Hartlepools won 2–1 in the first qualifying round only to go out in the second, beaten by South Bank after a replay. They also entered the professional North-Eastern League, finished fourth in their initial season, and remained members of that league until 1920–21; their best season was 1910–11, when they finished third. West Hartlepool managed to continue for a few seasons however it was not long before they broke up leaving Hartlepools United as the only team in town. In 1910, the club took over the assets and liabilities of West Hartlepool who had been dissolved that year.

In 1921, Hartlepools were elected to the newly formed Football League Third Division North, being among the 18 applicants accepted as members. On 27 August 1921, Hartlepools played their first ever Football League match, defeating Wrexham 2–0. In 1921–22, Hartlepools finished their first Football League campaign in 4th place. Two seasons later, Hartlepools came 21st in the table, so were obliged to apply for re-election to the League; they and bottom club Barrow were elected unopposed. In the 1935–36 season, the club reached the third round of the FA Cup for the first time. Drawn against Grimsby Town, they held the First Division club to a goalless draw, but lost the replay. By the time the Second World War put a temporary end to competitive football, they had spent 18 consecutive seasons in the Third Division North, courtesy of two more successful applications for re-election.

== 1946–1969: FA Cup runs and first promotion ==
On 31 August 1946, Hartlepools played their first game after World War Two, drawing 1–1 with Barrow. In the mid-1950s, Hartlepools enjoyed improved performances in both league and cup competition. In the FA Cup, they reached the fourth round for the first time in 1954–55, losing to Nottingham Forest in a replay after extra time. In 1956, Hartlepools narrowly lost 1–0 to First Division reigning champions Chelsea in the FA Cup. In the subsequent FA Cup campaign, Hartlepools lost 4–3 to Manchester United. The attendance of 17,426 remains the club's highest attendance. Hartlepools managed to fight back from 3–0 down to level the game at 3–3 before Manchester United scored a late winner. The Red Devils' manager Matt Busby described it as "the most exciting match I've ever watched" in his autobiography. Those three league seasons brought top-six finishes, culminating in what remains the club's record high of second place in 1956–57 only the champions Derby County were promoted. In 1958, the club were placed in the newly formed Fourth Division. During 1959, Hartlepools defeated Barrow 10–1, a club record victory for a League match which remains to this day.

However, Hartlepools did not fare well in the fourth tier. After five consecutive applications for re-election and with the club in financial difficulties, in the 1965–66 season they appointed the 30-year-old Brian Clough in October 1965 to his first managerial role. His reaction was "I don't fancy the place", but he took the job anyway alongside Peter Taylor. In order to generate funds for the club, Clough visited every pub in town. In May 1966, Clough gave future European Cup winning captain John McGovern his professional debut aged 16 years old. Alongside Taylor, aided by a change of chairmanship, built a team that finished eighth in 1966–67. Although Clough and Taylor then left for Derby County, the team maintained their form, finished third, and won promotion for the first time in the club's history in 1967–68. Promotion was confirmed with a 2–0 win against Swansea Town. In 1968 the "s" and the "United" were dropped from the team name of "Hartlepools United". This was due to the merger of West Hartlepool with the older smaller town of Hartlepool and the village of Hart into one new borough named "Hartlepool". However, Hartlepool were relegated the following season after finishing in 22nd place.

== 1969–1991: Stagnation in the Fourth Division and re-elections ==
Under Len Ashurst (who became manager in 1971), the team slowly began to revive after years of largely indifferent form. The 1971–72 season saw a welcome improvement to 18th, and possibly saved the club; Barrow, who had finished bottom the previous year, were voted out in favour of Hereford United despite having improved to 22nd. The club once again avoided the re-election zone in 1972–73, finishing in 20th place, but with four successive finishes either in or not far above the bottom four and strong challenges coming from non-league sides, the club needed to show signs of improvement. Ashurst did precisely that, finishing in 11th in 1973–74; he then left the club to manage Gillingham.

Ken Hale took over and guided the team to 13th and 14th over the next two seasons. The club also reached the League Cup fourth round in 1974–75 (still a club record) where they lost a replay to eventual winners Aston Villa. However, 1976–77 saw a return to the doldrums; Hale was sacked after failing to win any of the first nine games at the start of October. His successor Billy Horner could not stop the rot either, and the team finished in 22nd place. Again there was a strong challenger from non-league in the form of Wimbledon; however, as the club was seeking re-election for the first time in six years, it was Workington – bottom for a second successive year that made way. Over the close season the team's name was changed to its current form of Hartlepool United. A tragedy struck the club a few weeks before the end of the season when 20-year-old player Dave Wiggett was killed in a car crash.

A marginal improvement to 21st the following year again saw the club applying to stay in the league; and again a strong non-league challenge, this time from Wigan Athletic, was enough to dispose of Southport. It seemed to be only a matter of time before Hartlepool United followed the same way. Once again then, it was a huge relief for the supporters that Horner managed to make considerable improvements the following season. A large part of this was due to the strike partnership of Bob Newton and Keith Houchen; the latter would be the club's leading scorer in each of the following four seasons. There was also relative success in the FA Cup, with Crystal Palace being defeated at Victoria Park thanks to two goals from Newton as the club made the fourth round.

1978–79 saw a finish in 13th place; 19th the following season was still enough to stay clear of the re-election zone, and then 1980–81 saw the team produce its best season in over a decade, never being out of the top 10 and looking promotion contenders for a long spell before falling away to finish ninth. Financial issues were however making waves off the pitch and in particular the ownership of the ground. The Town Council were approached by the club with a view to buying the ground in January 1977, and although this was initially turned down, negotiations continued. In February 1978, a deal seemed to have been agreed; however chairman Vince Barker accused the council of delaying the deal when it was not complete 12 months later. Barker would accuse the council of trying to renege on the deal in July 1980, and even threatened to move the club out of the town amidst rumours that he was prepared to sell up and allow the club to be moved to Scarborough.

1981–82 saw the team finish in 14th place despite both Houchen and Newton scoring 18 goals, but their partnership was drawing to a close and with it four seasons of relative success. The club was running into financial difficulties under Vince Barker, and both forwards would be sold the following season for fees that failed to reflect their value to the club but allowed bills to be paid. The team finished in 22nd – back in the re-election zone. Billy Horner handed over his duties at the end of March to John Duncan. Duncan's time at the club was limited. Having been appointed in April, just nine weeks later he left to take over at Chesterfield. Hartlepool appointed Mick Docherty; however after six months and with the team struggling, he too left the club. Even for Hartlepool, four managers in the space of eight months was somewhat farcical; the fact that the decision was made to re-appoint Billy Horner (initially as a temporary measure, although he would actually remain in charge until November 1986) made the situation even worse.

Dissatisfaction with the club's board grew; attendances fell; performances remained poor. An eventual finish of 23rd, and a club record low attendance of 790 for the game with Stockport County on 5 May 1984, showed a club that looked to be going nowhere. The application for re-election was again successful, with the club once more polling the lowest figure of the League clubs, the result was secured on the back of an agreement being made amongst the club chairmen to enter into meaningful dialogue over direct promotion and relegation with the Alliance Premier League. Many felt that without that agreement being made, Hartlepool United would have been voted out because of their perennial re-election applications. Maidstone United were the unfortunate non-league champions to have the Football League door slammed in their faces for the second year running. During the close season chairman Barker left the club, John Smart taking over. Once again though Horner managed to produce an improvement, to 19th, before making a team that looked capable of winning promotion. After a shaky start to 1985–86, the team climbed into the top three by mid-October; were still in a promotion spot in early March; and eventually faded slightly to finish in seventh place.

Any hopes that Horner might lead the club to promotion faded shortly after the start of the 1986–87 season. After drawing the first four games of the season, Pools then lost the next four before finally recording their first win against Lincoln City in the ninth game; a further six games without a win were enough to see the club looking in serious danger of being the first club to be automatically relegated from the Football League and saw Horner depart. He was replaced by John Bird, a former player at the club. Form improved slightly, but although the team eventually finished in relative safety in 18th, they were only three points ahead of Lincoln City who suffered relegation. One peculiarity of the season concerned Middlesbrough; the financially struggling Teessiders had been locked out of their ground Ayresome Park, but were due to play a home game on the opening day of the season. Had they not fulfilled the fixture they would have been expelled from the League; Hartlepool stepped into the breach and offered the use of the Victoria Ground. After Hartlepool's draw with Cardiff City in the afternoon, Middlesbrough played their game with Port Vale the same evening.

The following season saw an improvement to 16th place, this time comfortably above relegated Newport County and in fact only 11 points from the playoff places; however a poor run of form towards the end of the season (four points from the last 10 games) cost the team any hope of promotion. Notable events from the season included both Paul Baker and Andy Toman scoring 20 or more goals in all competitions, and beating neighbours Sunderland in the Associate Members Cup before eventually losing out to Preston North End in the Northern semi-final. Bird had however made something of a name for himself as a manager, and when early season form saw Hartlepool United in second place at the end of September 1988, he left the club to join York City. Former Newcastle United captain Bobby Moncur was appointed to succeed Bird, but failed to inspire the team; results suffered with Hartlepool eventually finishing 19th. Five successive league defeats opened the 1989–90 season, and Moncur eventually resigned in November with the club rooted to the bottom of the table having taken just nine points from 18 games with 46 goals conceded.

The new manager appointed though would become a legend at the club. Cyril Knowles had been a distinguished player, and had a growing reputation as a manager; with the addition of several new signings, he achieved a remarkable turnaround. From having 9 points from 19 games, Knowles led the side to 55 by the end of the season – and a safe 19th place in the table. Even better was to follow the next season. With the partnership of Paul Baker and Joe Allon working well in attack, the team were in the top 10 for much of the season and in with a good chance of reaching a play-off place. Then, tragedy struck in February 1991 when Knowles was diagnosed with brain cancer and Alan Murray took over on a temporary basis. Under Murray, the team's form improved further and the club went into the final day of the season as one of several clubs that could win not just promotion but the title. A 3–1 win over Northampton Town was enough to secure promotion in third place.

== 1991–2012: Success under Hornsey and IOR ==
However, Knowles was still suffering from cancer and in June 1991 Murray was given the manager's job on a permanent basis as Knowles had now undergone three operations but still had the cancer. He died on 30 August 1991, aged 47. Although Allon signed for Chelsea over the close season, Murray was able to retain the majority of the squad, and also signed players such as Andy Saville and Lenny Johnrose as the club finished in a highly respectable 11th in the Third Division. The 1992–93 season saw the club playing in the new Division Two, as the formation of the Premier League had caused a re-labelling of the divisions. By October, the team was in second place, level on points with leaders West Bromwich Albion. The club remained in the play-off hunt until New Year, and then achieved one of the best results in its history after beating Crystal Palace 1–0 in the FA Cup third round – the first time that Hartlepool had beaten a top division side. However, this would prove to be the end of the club's success for several years. It was revealed shortly after the cup win that the club were in financial difficulties. To make ends meet, a number of players were released or sold, and the club set an unenviable record by going 1,227 minutes without scoring. During this run Murray was sacked and replaced by Viv Busby. The club eventually escaped relegation, finishing 16th.

The following season was an unmitigated disaster. With no money to bring in players, the team struggled all season. Busby was replaced in November 1993 by John MacPhail, but he could do little as the team remained in the relegation places from November until the end of the season. Relegation was assured following a 7–0 defeat at Rotherham United; the final day of the season saw the team thrashed 8–1 by Plymouth Argyle at the Victoria Ground. The next five seasons saw constant struggle and a succession of managers. Gibson finally sold the club to local businessman Harold Hornsey, who at least was able to financially stabilise the club; but with little money available for players times were hard. MacPhail left early in 1994–95 and was replaced by Dave McCreery; he was replaced towards the end of the same season by Keith Houchen, who had returned as a player. Houchen was in turn replaced after 18 months by Mick Tait. Meanwhile, the club finished in 18th, 20th (twice) and 17th. There was also a change of ownership in 1997: Hornsey sold the club to IOR Ltd, with Ken Hodcroft becoming chairman.

Matters came to a head in 1998–99; Tait's side were struggling, and even the signing of former England international Peter Beardsley had not changed the club's fortunes. Tait was sacked in January 1999, and Chris Turner was appointed; despite being four points adrift at the bottom of the League at Easter, Turner was able to prevent the club being relegated. Under Turner, matters improved drastically. In 1999–2000 they reached the play-offs, but were beaten by local rivals Darlington in the semi-finals. Pools qualified for the play-offs for the next two seasons as well – though on both occasions they were defeated in the semi-finals, by Blackpool and Cheltenham Town respectively. In 2002–03, Hartlepool finished in second place and won automatic promotion to the Second Division for the third time in the club's history. Turner had however left to take over Sheffield Wednesday part way through the season with Mike Newell replacing him. Hartlepool had been at the top of the league for the majority of the season but could only win one match from their final four, meaning that Rushden & Diamonds won the league. Newell was relieved of his duties over the close season, with Neale Cooper replacing him in June 2003. Hartlepool enjoyed an exceptional campaign in 2003–04, with highlights including an 8–1 victory over Grimsby Town and a trip to Sunderland in the third round of the FA Cup (followed by 9,109 away supporters). They finished sixth and secured a play-off place on the final day of the season with a 1–1 draw away at Swindon Town. However, they lost to third-placed Bristol City in the play-offs by 3–2 on aggregate. The season also saw Eifion Williams called up to the Wales squad and looked set to become only the second Hartlepool player ever to win an international cap while at the club; however he had to withdraw due to injury.

The club finished sixth in the league again in the 2004–05 season, despite the departure of Cooper just before the end of the season due to personal issues. In the play-off semi-final, they defeated Tranmere Rovers 6–5 on penalties after the sides had each won their home leg 2–0. The club failed to win promotion, losing 4–2 to Sheffield Wednesday after extra time in front of an attendance of 59,808 in the play-off final. Hartlepool had been leading 2–1 with eight minutes of regular time to go, but a controversial penalty decision in the 82nd minute, which also saw Chris Westwood sent off, allowed Sheffield Wednesday to level the scores making it 2–2 at the end of 90 minutes. Hartlepool struggled in extra time and conceded two further goals. Following this achievement Cooper's assistant Martin Scott was appointed as manager. The 2005–06 season saw the side slip down the division to the relegation places helped in part by poor management, an indecisive board room and key player injuries. Manager Martin Scott was suspended after an alleged fight with a player in the changing rooms, which resulted in his dismissal. Youth team coach Paul Stephenson was put in charge until the end of the season, aided by former manager Chris Turner who returned to the club as Director of Sport, nevertheless, he could not prevent the club being relegated into the fourth tier in May 2006.

In June 2006, Danny Wilson was appointed as the new manager. Under Wilson, Hartlepool returned to League One at the first time of asking, finishing second behind champions Walsall. On 1 January 2007, Hartlepool United equalled the all-time Football League record of consecutive wins without conceding a goal by winning 1–0 at Mansfield Town; this had been the eighth straight win without conceding. Hartlepool sealed promotion with an away win at Wycombe Wanderers but missed out on the title on the final day after losing 2–1 at home to Bristol Rovers. However, it was a very successful season which saw Hartlepool go 23 games unbeaten during the season. They maintained their League One status by finishing 15th in the 2007–08 season. On 19 October 2007, tragedy struck when midfielder Michael Maidens died aged 20 years old. In December 2008, Danny Wilson was sacked; while the club were unbeaten in four games and well clear of the relegation zone, the board felt that Wilson could take the club no further. Chris Turner was quickly returned to the managerial position, combining the role with his existing position as the club's Director of Sport. In the 2008–09 season, Hartlepool celebrated their centenary season with a run in the FA Cup and League Cup: beating Premier League sides Stoke City and West Brom. Pools stayed up on the final day of the season despite losing 4–1 to Bristol Rovers.

In 2009–10 Hartlepool finished in 20th place. Hartlepool had received a three-point deduction for fielding an ineligible player during a victory over Brighton. The club survived on the final day of the season with a 0–0 draw against Brentford being enough to keep them in League One, albeit on goal difference alone. Chris Turner resigned from the club a few weeks into the following season and Mick Wadsworth took over on a temporary basis, before being appointed permanently a month later. The 2010–11 season ended up going much the same as the previous one, with the club in play-off contention in the middle of the campaign before falling away as the season went on. However, the drop in Hartlepool's form was not as severe as it had been in the previous two seasons, and they finished in 16th place, well clear of the relegation zone. A peculiarity of the season saw Hartlepool's goalkeeper Scott Flinders score a late equaliser in a 2–2 draw with AFC Bournemouth. The club started the following 2011–12 season well but a bad run of form resulted in the sacking of Wadsworth in December, with former manager Neale Cooper returning to the club as his replacement. While Cooper was not able to get the club back to their early form, the side stayed generally consistent for the remainder of the season and secured a 13th-place finish.

== 2012–2018: Decline and relegation into non-League football ==
The following 2012–13 season started with just one win in fourteen league games, and in the wake of a defeat by Bury, which moved Hartlepool to the bottom of the table, Cooper resigned, bringing an end to his second spell after less than a year. He was replaced by Livingston manager John Hughes, and while the club's form gradually improved, they were ultimately unable to overcome the first half of the season, which saw them secure 9 points and just one win from their first 23 games. Hartlepool finished second-bottom of the league after six seasons in the third tier. Hughes publicly stated that he wanted to remain as manager despite the relegation, however, he was sacked by Hodcroft and replaced by Colin Cooper.

After an extensive overhaul of the playing squad during the summer, Hartlepool finished the 2013–14 season in 19th-place that season, their lowest finish in 15 years. In the 2014–15 season, Cooper resigned a few weeks into the campaign following a 3–0 home defeat to Carlisle United which left Hartlepool at the bottom of the Football League. Paul Murray replaced Cooper, only to be sacked just two months later, with the club six points adrift at the bottom of League Two, and having just suffered an FA Cup elimination at the hands of non-League Blyth Spartans. Ken Hodcroft resigned and sold the club to Peter Harris in December 2014. Harris' first decision was to appoint former Tranmere Rovers manager Ronnie Moore to the managers' job. The takeover ultimately fell through due to Harris and his associates being involved in dubious activities with the club reverting to Hodcroft's ownership. After being ten points adrift in bottom place at the turn of the year, in what has been termed the "great escape" and "miracle", a revival in form saw Hartlepool escape the relegation places and secure survival in the penultimate game of the season.

June 2015 saw a change of ownership, handing over to Essex recruitment firm JPNG (liquidated in 2017), which appointed director Gary Coxall as chairman. By February 2016, with Hartlepool in 21st place, JPNG decided to sack Ronnie Moore and replaced him with Craig Hignett. Pools stabilised under Hignett, ending the season in 16th-place. The 2016–17 season started with Hignett being sacked in January 2017 and replaced by Dave Jones. Form under Jones deteriorated further, with only 13 points gained from a possible 54. With three games to go, Hartlepool dropped into the relegation zone after a loss at home to Barnet. That result prompted a passionate rant by Jeff Stelling live on Soccer Saturday, which resulted in the sacking of Dave Jones. The final round of fixtures meant either Newport County or Hartlepool would be relegated to the National League. After being 1–0 down to Doncaster Rovers, Hartlepool looked doomed. Substitute Devante Rodney scored two unanswered goals to leave Hartlepool above the relegation zone, however, an 89th-minute goal for Newport consigned Hartlepool to non-league football for the first time after 96 years in the Football League.

In June 2017, HUFC Holding Ltd bought the club for a nominal fee with Pam Duxbury becoming chairwoman following Coxall's resignation in May. Hartlepool had faced three winding-up petitions during the 2016–17 season. Duxbury claimed that she had stopped the club going into administration several times in the prior months in an official statement. Craig Harrison was appointed as manager ahead of Hartlepool's first campaign in non-League. By November, off-field financial issues intensified which coincided with a winless run of eleven games. In a statement, Pam Duxbury said that a number of "legacy issues have consumed high financial and human resources" and that the club needed £200,000 in order to survive. In response to the financial issues, fans set up a JustGiving page which raised just over £85,000, including donations from supporters across the UK. An initiative called 'Save Pools Day' took place on 20 January 2018 for a fixture against Wrexham where supporters from other clubs visited to raise funds via ticket sales and other fundraising methods. The poor run of form resulted in the sacking of Craig Harrison in February who was replaced by caretaker manager Matthew Bates. In March 2018, Hartlepool Borough Council agreed to lend the club £77,500 to help the club during its financial crisis. Hartlepool won three consecutive matches to pull away from the relegation places and finally guaranteed safety from relegation in April. Hartlepool's first season in non-League ended with the club avoiding liquidation when Raj Singh bought the club in April. Hartlepool ultimately finished a turbulent season in 15th place.

== 2018–present: Raj Singh ==

The Hartlepool team that beat Torquay United in the 2021 National League play-off final 5–4 on penalties after a 1–1 draw.

Pools started the 2018–19 season brightly, however, six consecutive defeats led to Bates' sacking after 9 months in charge in November. He was replaced by the experienced Richard Money. However, after only six matches in charge, Money decided the job was not for him and switched roles with director of football Craig Hignett in January 2019. Hignett guided Hartlepool to a 16th-place finish, which was the lowest league finish in the club's history. Early in 2019–20 Raj Singh took the decision to sack Craig Hignett and replaced him with Dave Challinor. Pools' league form improved under Challinor, however, the COVID-19 pandemic forced the cancellation of the season after 39 games with league positions decided on a points-per-game basis with Hartlepool placed in 12th.

In 2020–21, Hartlepool earned promotion to League Two at the fourth attempt via the play-offs. The season was defined by the COVID-19 pandemic with the vast majority of fixtures being played behind closed doors. Due to the easing of COVID restrictions, a limited number of spectators (1,700) were allowed for Hartlepool's final match of the season, a 4–0 victory against Weymouth. This was the first time in 14 months that fans were permitted to attend matches due to the pandemic. Hartlepool finished 4th in the regular season, meaning that they met Bromley in the play-off eliminator which they won 3–2. In the semi-final, Hartlepool won 1–0 at Stockport County thanks to a goal by Rhys Oates. In the 2021 play-off final, Hartlepool played Torquay United at Ashton Gate with Hartlepool taking the lead via Luke Armstrong in the first half. However, Torquay equalised in the 95th minute thanks to a header by the goalkeeper Lucas Covolan to take the match to extra time and then penalties. Hartlepool managed to win the shootout 5–4, which ended their four-year spell in non-League.

After a four-year hiatus from League football, Hartlepool won their first match back in League Two, beating Crawley Town 1–0. In September 2021, Challinor signed a new three-year contract, however in November 2021 he decided to join non-League side Stockport County. In December 2021, former defender Graeme Lee was announced as the new manager. He was dismissed after only five months, following a run of 11 games with only one win which saw the club slide from mid-table to 17th. Hartlepool ultimately finished a turbulent season 16 points clear of relegation whilst maintaining two strong cup runs. Pools reached the fourth round of the FA Cup before succumbing to Premier League side Crystal Palace 2–0 backed by nearly 5,000 away fans. In the EFL Trophy, Hartlepool reached the semi-finals for the first time before losing out on penalties to Rotherham United.

In June 2022, Cove Rangers manager Paul Hartley was appointed as the new manager, but only lasted three months after a disastrous start to the 2022–23 season left them without a win after nine league games. Keith Curle was appointed as his replacement on an interim basis before becoming the permanent manager in December 2022, but was relieved of his duties on 22 February 2023 and replaced by John Askey with Pools one point clear of the relegation zone but having played four matches more than Crawley Town. In the third final match of the season, Hartlepool faced direct relegation rivals Crawley Town at home in a vital match. However, Pools were defeated 2–0, leaving them on the brink of relegation, six points from safety with two games to play and with an inferior goal difference. Relegation back to the National League was confirmed the following week after only two seasons in the EFL despite a win against Barrow.

On 26 April 2023, Hartlepool United were put up for sale by chairman Raj Singh. After having signed a three-year contract after a positive start to the 2023–24 season, Askey was dismissed on 30 December after a downturn in form which had seen Hartlepool win three of their previous 19 league games, leaving the club in 17th-position in the National League. On 20 January 2024, Kevin Phillips was announced as Askey's successor. Having guided Hartlepool to a 12th place finish, Phillips left after his contract expired at the end of the season. He was replaced the same day by Darren Sarll.
