= Ray Thompson =

Ray Thompson may refer to:

== Sportspeople ==
- Ray Thompson (rugby league) (born 1990), Australian rugby league player
- Ray Thompson (footballer) (1925–1996), English footballer
- Raymond Thompson (swimmer) (1911–1999), American freestyle swimmer
- Raymond Thompson (luger) (born 1989), British luger

== Other people ==
- Ray Thompson (politician), former North Dakota state treasurer, see Political party strength in North Dakota
- Raymond Thompson (1949–2025), British-born Canadian/New Zealand screenwriter, composer and producer
- Ray "Red" Thompson (1889–1927), American stuntman and actor
- Ray Thompson, fictional character who is a sidekick to the Justice Guild of America
- Raymond Thompson (priest) (born 1942), Dean of Clogher, 2005–2009
- Raymond H. Thompson, professor and Arthurian scholar
