= Harry Wensley =

English footballer

Personal information
- Full name: Henry Wensley
- Date of birth: 19 June 1893
- Place of birth: Eldon, County Durham, England
- Date of death: 1959 (aged 65–66)
- Position: Centre forward

Senior career*
| Years | Team | Apps | (Gls) |
| 1914–1915 | Shildon Athletic | | |
| 1919–1920 | Stanley United | | |
| 1920 | Darlington | | |
| 1920–1921 | Bishop Auckland | | |
| 1921–1922 | Durham City | 25 | (7) |
| 1922–1925 | Shildon Athletic | | |
| 1925–1927 | Hartlepools United | 76 | (37) |
| 1928 | Shildon | | |
| Total | | 101 | (44) |
- * Club domestic league appearances and goals

Henry Wensley (19 June 1893 – 1959) was an English footballer who played in the Football League for Durham City and Hartlepools United.
