= Ken Johnson (footballer) =

English footballer

Personal information
- Full name: Kenneth Johnson
- Date of birth: 15 February 1931
- Place of birth: Hartlepool, England
- Date of death: 29 December 2011 (aged 80)
- Position: Inside forward

Senior career*
Years	Team	Apps	(Gls)
–1949	Seaton Holy Trinity	?	
1949–1964	Hartlepools United	384	(98)
- * Club domestic league appearances and goals

Kenneth Johnson (15 February 1931 – 29 December 2011) was an English footballer who played as an inside forward in the Football League in the 1950s and 1960s, spending his whole senior career with Hartlepools United.

He was born in Hartlepool and joined Hartlepools United from local team Seaton Holy Trinity. He made his Pools debut on 31 December 1949 against Bradford City and went on to play 413 matches for the club, with his final appearance coming against Newport County on 6 April 1964. He is seventh on the all-time list for most Hartlepool appearances, and the club's joint second highest all-time Hartlepool goalscorer, having scored 106 in all competitions. His goals tally includes six scored in the FA Cup, one of which was against Manchester United on 5 January in the 1956-57 tournament, a day which saw Hartlepools' record ever attendance of 17,264.

In 1956 he was chosen to play for the Football League Third Division North select team for the match against Division Three South, along with his teammates George Luke and Watty Moore.

Johnson died on 29 December 2011.
