= Johnny Edgar =

English footballer

Personal information
- Full name: John Edgar
- Date of birth: 9 April 1936
- Place of birth: Worsbrough Dale, England
- Date of death: c. 1 February 2008 (aged 71)
- Place of death: Barnsley, South Yorkshire, England
- Position: Inside forward

Senior career*
| Years | Team | Apps | (Gls) |
| 1954–1958 | Barnsley | 22 | (6) |
| 1958–1959 | Gillingham | 45 | (23) |
| 1959–1961 | York City | 47 | (16) |
| 1961–1963 | Hartlepools United | 72 | (31) |
| 1963 | Exeter City | 6 | (0) |
| Total | | 192 | (76) |
- * Club domestic league appearances and goals

John "Johnny" Edgar (9 April 1936 – January/February 2008) was an English footballer who scored 76 goals from 192 appearances in the Football League.

== Career ==
Edgar started his career with Barnsley in May 1954. After making 22 appearances and scoring six goals in the league for Barnsley, he joined Gillingham in June 1958. He made 45 appearances and scored 23 goals in the league for them, before joining York City in June 1959, and was regarded an important capture, as the club faced their first season in the Third Division. He scored the club's quickest hat-trick, after scoring three goals in six minutes in a 3–0 win over Accrington Stanley in October 1959. He finished the 1959–60 season as the club's top scorer, after scoring 17 goals. His appearances the following season were curtailed by a serious injury and moved to Hartlepools United in June 1961. He joined Exeter City in July 1963, after making 72 appearances and scoring 31 goals in the league for Hartlepools. He made six appearances for Exeter.

Edgar died in early 2008, at the age of 71.
