= Angus McLean (footballer) =

Welsh footballer and manager (1925–1979)

Personal information
- Full name: Angus McLean
- Date of birth: 20 September 1925
- Place of birth: Queensferry, Wales
- Date of death: 1 July 1979 (aged 53)
- Place of death: Shaw, England
- Position: Full back

Senior career*
Years	Team	Apps	(Gls)
- Aberystwyth Town
–1939	Hilton Main		
1939–1951	Wolverhampton Wanderers	144	(2)
1951–?	Aberystwyth Town		
?–1953	Bromsgrove Rovers		
1953–1954	Bury	12	(0)
1954–1955	Crewe Alexandra	17	(0)

Managerial career
- 1951–?: Aberystwyth Town
- 1967–1970: Hartlepool
- 1973–1975: Bromsgrove Rovers
- * Club domestic league appearances and goals

Angus McLean (20 September 1925 – 1 July 1979) was a football player and club manager.

A solidly built centre-half who began his career with Aberystwyth Town, McLean moved on to Hilton Main before joining Wolverhampton Wanderers as an amateur in 1939.

McLean turned professional in November 1942 and helped Wolves to top six finishes in each of the first three post-war seasons. A knee injury kept him out of the team for most of the 1948–49 season and so he missed out on a place in Wolves' 1949 FA Cup winning side.

McLean left Wolves in May 1951 to become player-manager at Aberystwyth Town, subsequently joining Bromsgrove Rovers as a player. In May 1953, McLean joined Bury as player-coach, moving to Crewe Alexandra as a player the following June.

After leaving Crewe he coached a number of non-league sides before taking over from Brian Clough as manager of Hartlepools United in May 1967. The following season, he led Hartlepool to their first ever promotion, but they were relegated after just one season. Despite relegation, McLean remained in charge, but was sacked in April 1970 when Hartlepool finished in the bottom four and were forced to seek re-election to the Football League.

McLean managed Bromsgrove Rovers between 1973 and 1975, after which time he worked as a scout until his death in 1979.
