= Jack Manners (footballer) =

English footballer

Personal information
- Full name: John Manners
- Date of birth: 27 December 1877
- Place of birth: Morpeth, England
- Date of death: 2 May 1946 (aged 68)
- Place of death: West Hartlepool, England
- Position: Wing half

Senior career*
Years	Team	Apps	(Gls)
1902–1903	Morpeth YMCA		
1903–1904	Morpeth Harriers		
1904–1912	West Bromwich Albion	193	(7)
1913–1920	Hartlepools United		
Total		193	(7)

Managerial career
- 1913–1920: Hartlepools United
- 1924–1927: Hartlepools United
- * Club domestic league appearances and goals

John Manners (27 December 1877–2 May 1946) was an English footballer who played in the Football League for West Bromwich Albion and was also manager of Hartlepools United.

== Playing career ==
He was born on 27 December 1877 in Morpeth, England.

Manners began his playing career at Morpeth YMCA. He captained the side to winning the East Northumberland League title in the 1897–98 season. Whilst with Morpeth YMCA, Manners once played in goal and saved a penalty. In May 1904, Manners turned down a move to Bury opting to sign for West Bromwich Albion instead. In September 1904, Manners made his debut for West Brom as a centre-back. Manners was a member of the West Brom side that won the Football League Second Division in the 1910–11 season. He retired from playing at the end of the subsequent season. He made 208 appearances in total, scoring seven times.

== Managerial career ==
He joined Hartlepools United for the 1913–14 season as a player-manager, replacing Percy Humphreys. He made 31 appearances in all competitions in his first season. His spell at Hartlepools was interrupted by World War I. After football was resumed in 1919–20, Manners made one appearance at the age of 42.

Manners retired at the end of the 1919–20 season, leaving the club on 1 May 1920 and became a football scout in the Midlands. After Hartlepools had joined the Football League in 1921, Manners rejoined the club in June 1924. In Manners' second spell in charge, he led the club to a top six finish in his first season. He departed the club on 31 July 1927.

== Post-football ==
After leaving his role with Hartlepools in 1927, Manners remained in the area but remained a scout for West Brom. He represented the Town Bowls Club numerous times. He suffered a fall from a ladder at the age of 68 and died two days later in hospital on 2 May 1946. Hartlepools and West Brom sent wreaths for his funeral.

== Honours ==
Morpeth YMCA

- East Northumberland League: 1897–98

West Bromwich Albion

- Football League Second Division: 1910–11
