= Alan Goad (English footballer) =

English former football player

Personal information
- Full name: Alan Michael Goad
- Date of birth: 8 August 1948 (age 78)
- Place of birth: Hailsham, England
- Position: Left back

Senior career*
Years	Team	Apps	(Gls)
1965–1967	Exeter City	6	(0)
1967–1978	Hartlepool United	418	(11)
1980–1981	Vancouver Whitecaps (indoor)	14	(8)
1981	Vancouver Whitecaps	15	(0)
1982–1982	Vancouver Whitecaps (indoor)	17	(5)
- * Club domestic league appearances and goals

Alan Michael Goad (born 8 August 1948) is an English retired footballer and coach who played as a defender for Exeter City, Hartlepool United and Vancouver Whitecaps. He is fifth in Hartlepool's all-time appearance holders list.

== Playing career ==
Goad started his playing career with Exeter City in 1965. He spent two seasons with The Grecians playing six times.

In 1967, Goad signed for Hartlepool United. Goad won the club's Player of the Year award in 1975. In October 1976, he took up a player/coach role with Hartlepool. For his years of service to the club, Goad was awarded with a testimonial match in 1977 against Nottingham Forest who were managed by his former Hartlepool manager Brian Clough. Clough brought a full-strength side to Victoria Park and drew 2-2. Goad left Hartlepool in 1978, during his time with the club he made 418 appearances scoring eleven times.

In 1980, Goad moved to Canada and played for Vancouver Whitecaps. He also played for their indoor team. After finishing playing, Goad began coaching the Whitecaps youth team.

== Personal life ==
While playing for Hartlepool, Goad ran two pubs in Spennymoor. Goad still lives in British Columbia and since retiring from football coaching, he spends his days travelling with his wife Sue.
