= Ray Thompson (footballer) =

English football player (1925–1996)

Personal information
- Full name: Raymond Thompson
- Date of birth: 21 October 1925
- Place of birth: Spennymoor, England
- Date of death: December 1996 (aged 71)
- Place of death: Bishop Auckland, England
- Position: Full back

Senior career*
Years	Team	Apps	(Gls)
1945	Sunderland	0	(0)
1947–1958	Hartlepools United	396	(3)
Total		396	(3)
- * Club domestic league appearances and goals

Ray Thompson (21 October 1925 – December 1996) was an English footballer who played as a defender for Sunderland and Hartlepools United.

== Playing career ==
In 1945, Thompson began his playing career with Sunderland. However, he did not make a senior appearance for the club.

On 25 January 1947, Thompson made his first appearance for Hartlepools United which was in a 3–0 win against Southport. Thompson was an excellent servant for Pools and remained with the club for eleven years. Ray made 423 appearances in all competitions and was the second player in the club's history to play in over 400 games for Hartlepool. He is currently fourth in the club's all-time appearances list.

In May 1960, Thompson played in Watty Moore's testimonial game in a select XI.
