= Fred Westgarth =

English footballer and manager

Personal information
- Full name: Fred Westgarth
- Date of birth: 1 July 1887
- Place of birth: South Shields, England
- Date of death: 4 February 1957 (aged 69)

Managerial career
- Years: Team
- 1934–1936: Stockport County
- 1936–1938: Carlisle United
- 1938–1943: Bradford City
- 1943–1957: Hartlepools United

Fred Westgarth (July 1887 in South Shields, England – 4 February 1957) was an English footballer though he is more renowned for his role as a manager.

== Career ==
Westgarth was a successful football coach after a playing career achieved little of note. He was South Shields' assistant trainer before he joined Ebbw Vale, Workington and Luton Town in a training capacity. In 1938 he joined Stockport County as trainer-manager.

In December 1936 he moved to Carlisle United not waiting to see his Stockport side win the Division Three (North) title that season. In March 1938 he resigned at Carlisle to move to Bradford City.

He helped Bradford to lift its first honour for ten years, albeit in only the Third Division North Challenge Cup, in 1938-39. The following season, World War Two interrupted English football. Westgarth stayed at City until 1943 when he joined Hartlepools United.

He had a successful spell at Hartlepools during the mid-1950s. In 1955 the club reached the 4th round of the FA Cup, its best ever performance. In 1956-57 Hartlepools narrowly missed out on winning Division Three (North). But in 1957 he was taken seriously ill and died on 4 February shortly after he saw his side lose 4–3 to Manchester United in the FA Cup third round in front of a record 17,264 crowd at Victoria Park.

== Honours ==
- Third Division North Challenge Cup 1938-39 (with Bradford City)
