= George Luke (footballer, born 1933) =

English footballer

Personal information
- Full name: George Thomas Luke
- Date of birth: 17 December 1933
- Place of birth: Newcastle upon Tyne, England
- Date of death: 24 March 2010 (aged 76)
- Place of death: Forest Hall, England
- Position: Winger

Senior career*
Years	Team	Apps	(Gls)
1950–1953	Newcastle United	0	(0)
1953–1959	Hartlepools United	186	(60)
1959–1961	Newcastle United	27	(4)
1961–1963	Darlington	68	(10)
- * Club domestic league appearances and goals

George Luke (17 December 1933 – 24 March 2010) was an English footballer who played as a left-winger for Newcastle United, Hartlepools United and Darlington in the 1950s and early 1960s.

Luke, a native of Newcastle upon Tyne, began his career at his hometown club Newcastle United, while also working as an apprentice plumber. He signed for Newcastle in 1950, but never made any first-team appearances during his first spell at St James' Park. He moved on to Hartlepools United in 1953, where he had an illustrious six-year spell, scoring 60 goals in 186 league appearances.

In 1959, Luke's form for Hartlepools earned him a return to Newcastle, who paid a £4,000 transfer fee for his services. Luke only spent just over a year back at Newcastle, scoring four goals in 27 matches. He left Newcastle for a second time in January 1961, and finished his career at Darlington where he played until his retirement at the end of the 1962–63 season.

After his retirement from football, Luke opened a carpet shop in Forest Hall, Tyneside, where he lived until his death in March 2010.
