= Alan Murray (footballer) =

English footballer (1949–2026)

Personal information
- Date of birth: 5 December 1949
- Place of birth: Newcastle upon Tyne, England
- Date of death: 20 June 2026 (aged 76)
- Position: Midfielder

Senior career*
Years	Team	Apps	(Gls)
1969–1971	Middlesbrough	10	(1)
1971–1972	York City	4	(0)
1972–1973	Brentford	45	(7)
1973–1977	Doncaster Rovers	146	(21)
- Frickley Athletic
Total		205	(29)

Managerial career
- 1991–1993: Hartlepool United
- 1993–1995: Darlington
- 1999: Benfica B
- * Club domestic league appearances and goals

Alan Murray (5 December 1949 – 20 June 2026) was an English football player, coach and manager.

== Career ==
Born in Newcastle upon Tyne, Murray spent the first years of his playing career at Middlesbrough, gradually honing his coaching skills as he struggled to break into the first team. He later moved on to York City, Brentford and Doncaster Rovers before finishing his playing career at Frickley Athletic.

His coaching skills were put to the test at Hartlepool United in 1991 when, with boss Cyril Knowles battling against a brain tumour that was to eventually prove fatal, Murray was shuffled from his chief executive role to the position of manager. A 17-month stint at Darlington followed where he gradually pulled the team away from the foot of the Football League before he teamed up with former teammate Graeme Souness at Southampton.

In September 2004 he once again joined Souness this time at Newcastle United as assistant manager.

== Death ==
Murray died on 20 June 2026, aged 76. His death was announced by Hartlepool United the following day.

== Managerial statistics ==
Team	From	To	Record				
Team	From	To	G	W	L	D	Win %
Hartlepool United	June 1991	February 1993	90	36	31	23	40.0
Darlington	October 1993	March 1995	64	21	29	14	32.8
