= Brian Honour =

English footballer (born 1964)

Personal information
- Full name: Brian Honour
- Date of birth: 16 February 1964 (age 62)
- Place of birth: Horden, England
- Height: 5 ft 7 in (1.70 m)
- Position: Midfielder

Youth career
- Hartlepool United

Senior career*
Years	Team	Apps	(Gls)
1981–1984	Darlington	74	(4)
1984	Peterlee Newtown		
1985–1995	Hartlepool United	319	(26)
1995–1996	Spennymoor United		
Total		393	(30)

Managerial career
- 1999: Hartlepool United (joint-caretaker)
- 2002–2005: Bishop Auckland
- 2007–2009: Bishop Auckland
- * Club domestic league appearances and goals

Brian Honour (born 16 February 1964) is an English former footballer who made nearly 400 appearances in the Football League playing as a midfielder for Darlington and mainly Hartlepool United. He had a brief spell as joint caretaker manager of Hartlepool with Paul Baker in 1999, managed at non-league level, and set up his own coaching school.

== Early career ==
Brian Honour began his career as a schoolboy for Aston Villa before being released for too being too small. His brother John was a regular at Hartlepool during the 1970s. Brian moved onto Darlington and stayed there for three seasons until he again was released by Darlington manager Cyril Knowles for being too small. He then had spells in the Northern League with Peterlee Newtown and Tow Law Town.

== Hartlepool United ==
Pools boss Billy Horner signed Honour from Peterlee in 1985, and he stayed with the club until he was forced to retire because of persistent knee problems in 1994. He made 384 appearances for Pools in all competitions, putting him 8th on the club's all-time list. His debut was in a game with Peterborough in February 1985, his last in August 1994 in a League Cup game with Bury.

One of his most memorable moments came in 1988 when during Hartlepool's 1–0 win over Sunderland at Roker Park in the Associate Members' Cup, he scored the game's only goal direct from a corner. Pools reached the semi-final of the Northern section as a result of his wind-assisted goal but they lost to Preston North End.

A knee injury meant he missed the majority of the 1989–90 season and as he returned to action, Pools had a new boss in his former Darlington manager Cyril Knowles. Honour became a mainstay of Knowles' successful side, and secured promotion in May 1991. Two of Honour's goals during the promotion run-in were shortlisted for the North East Goal of the Season Award, both spectacular individual efforts in a win at Maidstone United.

After promotion he remained with Pools and impressed at the higher level with his endeavour and wing play. He linked up well with full-back Keith Nobbs on the left side of the team.

On retirement, Honour was awarded a testimonial year by the club, the highlight a game between Pools' 1991 promotion winners and Kevin Keegan's Newcastle United side at Victoria Park. There was also a sportsman's dinner with Jack Charlton to pay tribute to him.

Honour became a regular on match days at Victoria Park, greeting guests in the hospitality areas and commentating on matches for the club's website and still runs the Brian Honour Soccer School.
