= Ken Hale (footballer) =

English footballer and manager

Personal information
- Full name: Kenneth Oliver Hale
- Date of birth: 18 September 1939
- Place of birth: Blyth, Northumberland, England
- Date of death: 5 January 2015 (aged 75)
- Position: Inside forward

Youth career
- –: Newcastle United

Senior career*
Years	Team	Apps	(Gls)
1957–1962	Newcastle United	30	(15)
1962–1966	Coventry City	99	(27)
1966–1968	Oxford United	66	(13)
1968–1972	Darlington	173	(25)
1972–1974	Halifax Town	52	(4)
Total		420	(84)

Managerial career
- 1972: Darlington (player-manager)
- 1974–1976: Hartlepool
- * Club domestic league appearances and goals

Kenneth Oliver Hale (18 September 1939 – 5 January 2015) was an English football player and manager. He played as an inside forward for Newcastle United, Coventry City, Oxford United, Darlington and Halifax Town, and scored 84 goals from 420 appearances in the Football League. He had a brief spell as player-manager of Darlington in 1972, and went on to manage Hartlepool from 1974 to 1976.

== Managerial statistics ==
Managerial record by team and tenure
Team	From	To	Record				
Team	From	To	P	W	D	L	Win %
Darlington	January 1972	April 1972	21	7	2	12	33.3
Hartlepool	June 1974	October 1976	117	40	31	46	34.2
Total			138	47	33	58	34.1
