= Watty Moore =

English footballer

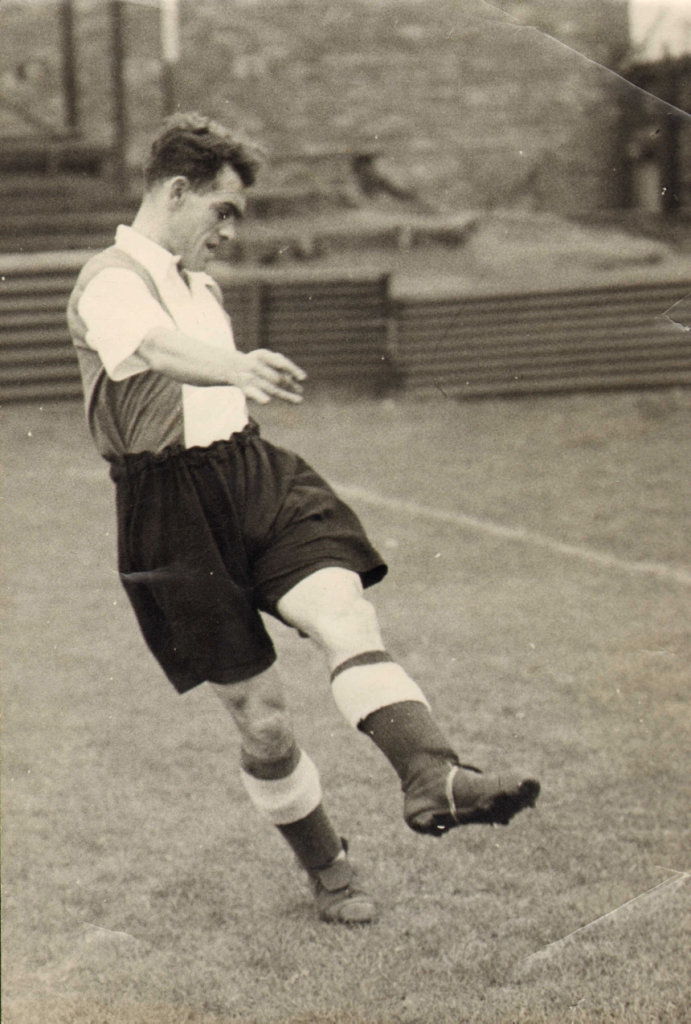

Personal information
- Full name: Watson Evans Moore
- Date of birth: 30 August 1925
- Place of birth: Hartlepool, England
- Date of death: 1967 (aged 41)
- Position: Centre-half

Youth career
- Oxford Street Old Boys

Senior career*
Years	Team	Apps	(Gls)
1948–1960	Hartlepool United	447	(3)
Total		447	(3)
- * Club domestic league appearances and goals

Watson Evans "Watty" Moore (30 August 1925 – 1967) was an English footballer for Hartlepool United. A one-club man, the centre-half held the all-time appearance record for Hartlepool for more than fifty years, making 472 starts for the club between 1948 and 1960. His record was overtaken by Ritchie Humphreys in 2011.

An amateur with Oxford Street Old Boys, he signed with Hartlepool United in 1948, at the age of 23. He started as a centre-forward, but converted to the centre-half position. He began on wages of £12 a week, and his mother attended every game in his career. He became club captain, and went on to make 472 appearances in all competitions, before retiring in 1960. He died from a heart attack at the age of 41.

== Career statistics ==
All appearances made by Watty Moore:

Appearances and goals by club, season and competition
Club	Season	League			FA Cup		Total	
Club	Season	Division	Apps	Goals	Apps	Goals	Apps	Goals
Hartlepools United	1948–49	Third Division North	3	1	0	0	3	1
Hartlepools United	1949–50	Third Division North	21	1	0	0	21	1
Hartlepools United	1950–51	Third Division North	40	0	2	0	42	0
Hartlepools United	1951–52	Third Division North	46	1	3	0	49	1
Hartlepools United	1952–53	Third Division North	45	0	1	0	46	0
Hartlepools United	1953–54	Third Division North	41	0	5	0	46	0
Hartlepools United	1954–55	Third Division North	46	0	7	0	53	0
Hartlepools United	1955–56	Third Division North	46	0	3	0	49	0
Hartlepools United	1956–57	Third Division North	46	0	3	0	49	0
Hartlepools United	1957–58	Third Division North	45	0	1	0	46	0
Hartlepools United	1958–59	Fourth Division	37	0	0	0	37	0
Hartlepools United	1959–60	Fourth Division	31	0	0	0	31	0
Career total			447	3	25	0	472	3
