= Paul Baker (footballer) =

English footballer, manager and scout

Personal information
- Full name: David Paul Baker
- Date of birth: 5 January 1963 (age 63)
- Place of birth: Newcastle upon Tyne, England
- Height: 6 ft 1 in (1.85 m)
- Position: Forward

Team information
- Current team: Newcastle United (academy scout)

Youth career
- Wallsend Boys Club

Senior career*
Years	Team	Apps	(Gls)
1983–1984	Bishop Auckland		
1984–1985	Southampton	0	(0)
1985–1987	Carlisle United	71	(11)
1987–1992	Hartlepool United	197	(67)
1992–1993	Motherwell	9	(1)
1993–1994	Gillingham	62	(16)
1994–1996	York City	48	(18)
1996	Torquay United	30	(8)
1996–1997	Scunthorpe United	21	(9)
1997–1999	Hartlepool United	38	(10)
1999–2000	Carlisle United	17	(2)
2000	Bedlington Terriers		
2000–2001	Durham City		
2001–2002	Blyth Spartans		

Managerial career
- 1999: Hartlepool United (joint caretaker)
- 2002–2004: Blyth Spartans
- 2005–2007: Newcastle Benfield
- 2008: Newcastle Blue Star
- * Club domestic league appearances and goals

David Paul Baker (born 5 January 1963) is an English former professional footballer, football manager and scout who works as academy scout at Premier League club Newcastle United.

A forward, he played more than 500 league matches during a career that included two spells each with Carlisle United and Hartlepool United, as well as spells with Motherwell, Gillingham, York City, Torquay United and Scunthorpe United.

After his playing career, Baker moved into coaching, management and scouting, including managerial spells with Blyth Spartans, Newcastle Benfield and Newcastle Blue Star. He has also worked in academy recruitment and scouting.

== Playing career ==
=== Early career and Carlisle United ===
Born in Newcastle upon Tyne, Baker played for Wallsend Boys Club and Bishop Auckland before joining Southampton in July 1984 for a fee of £4,000.

Baker did not make a league appearance for Southampton and joined Carlisle United on a free transfer in July 1985. He established himself in Carlisle's first team and made 71 league appearances, scoring 11 goals, during two seasons with the club.

=== Hartlepool United ===
In July 1987, Baker joined Hartlepool United on a free transfer. He became a regular goalscorer for the club and formed a forward partnership with Joe Allon. During his first spell at Victoria Park, Baker made 197 league appearances and scored 67 goals.

Baker was part of the Hartlepool side that won promotion from the Football League Fourth Division in 1990–91. He scored 18 league goals during the promotion season as Hartlepool finished third in the division.

Across his two spells at Hartlepool, Baker scored 93 goals in 279 appearances in all competitions, placing him among the club's leading goalscorers.

Baker left Hartlepool in August 1992 to join Scottish club Motherwell for a fee of £77,500.

=== Motherwell and Gillingham ===
Baker joined Motherwell in August 1992 after five seasons with Hartlepool United. He made nine league appearances and scored once during his short spell in Scotland.

In January 1993, Baker returned to England to join Gillingham. He joined a Gillingham side fighting to retain its place in the Football League and scored in a 2–0 victory over Halifax Town on the final day of the 1992–93 season, a result which secured the club's league status.

Baker remained at Priestfield the following season and ultimately made 62 league appearances for Gillingham, scoring 16 goals. He left the club in October 1994 to join York City for £15,000.

=== York City ===
Baker became a regular in the York side and made 48 league appearances, scoring 18 goals. In the summer of 1995, he was also appointed player-coach.

Baker was involved in one of York's most notable cup results when the club faced Manchester United at Old Trafford in the second round of the 1995–96 League Cup. York won the first leg 3–0 on 20 September 1995. Baker began the match as a substitute and was introduced during the second half, but was sent off after receiving two yellow cards.

He left York in January 1996 and joined Torquay United for a fee of £25,000.

=== Torquay United and Scunthorpe United ===
Baker made 30 league appearances for Torquay and scored eight goals. He remained with the club into the 1996–97 season before returning to northern England in October 1996, joining Scunthorpe United for £15,000.

His spell at Scunthorpe lasted less than six months, but he scored nine goals in 21 league appearances. He also scored five times in three FA Cup appearances during the 1996–97 season.

In March 1997, Baker left Scunthorpe and returned to Hartlepool United, where he took on a player-coach role.

=== Return to Hartlepool United ===
Baker returned to Hartlepool United in March 1997, combining his playing duties with a coaching role. He made a further 38 league appearances and scored ten goals during his second spell at the club.

In total, Baker made 279 appearances and scored 93 goals in all competitions across his two spells with Hartlepool, placing him among the club's leading goalscorers.

During the 1998–99 season, Baker also became involved in the management of the first team. Following the departure of manager Mick Tait, Baker and Brian Honour were placed in joint caretaker charge before the appointment of Chris Turner.

Baker left Hartlepool at the end of the 1998–99 season.

=== Carlisle United ===
In August 1999, Baker returned to Carlisle United, twelve years after leaving the club for Hartlepool. He made 17 league appearances and scored twice during the 1999–2000 season.

His second spell at Carlisle proved to be his final period as a regular Football League player. He left the club in 2000, having made more than 500 league appearances during his professional career.

=== Non-League football ===
After leaving Carlisle, Baker continued playing in non-League football. He joined Bedlington Terriers before moving to Durham City. He subsequently joined Blyth Spartans, where he combined playing with coaching before moving into management.

== Coaching and managerial career ==
=== Hartlepool United and Blyth Spartans ===
Baker began combining playing with coaching during his second spell at Hartlepool United. In 1999, following the departure of Mick Tait, Baker and Brian Honour briefly took joint caretaker charge of the first team.

After finishing his playing career, Baker moved into non-League management. In November 2002, he was appointed manager of Blyth Spartans, where he had previously played.

Baker remained in charge at Croft Park until September 2004. He was succeeded, following a brief caretaker spell by Graham Fenton, by Harry Dunn, who returned for a second spell as manager.

Baker subsequently worked within the academy setup at Newcastle United before returning to senior management.

=== Newcastle Benfield ===
In September 2005, Baker was appointed manager of Northern League club Newcastle Benfield.

During the 2006–07 season, he led the club to the fourth qualifying round of the FA Cup for the first time in its history. Newcastle Benfield also won the Northern League Cup in 2007, defeating Nissan 1–0 in the final.

Baker resigned as manager in December 2007.

=== Newcastle Blue Star ===
In March 2008, Baker joined Newcastle Blue Star as assistant manager to Tommy Cassidy.

Later that month, Cassidy left the club and Baker was appointed manager. His spell in charge was brief, and he left Newcastle Blue Star in May 2008 to take up a scouting position with Norwich City.

== Scouting and academy career ==
=== Norwich City ===
In May 2008, Baker left his position as manager of Newcastle Blue Star to join Norwich City as a scout. Norwich were managed at the time by former Newcastle United manager Glenn Roeder.

=== Hartlepool United ===
Baker later returned to Hartlepool United in a scouting capacity. By 2013, he was working as a scout for the club.

=== Newcastle United ===
Baker subsequently joined the academy recruitment operation at Newcastle United. In December 2016, he was reported to have been appointed to a scouting role focused on identifying young players in Europe.

Baker later took on a senior role within Newcastle's academy recruitment structure. In January 2021, the club identified him as the academy's Head of National and International Recruitment when announcing the signings of three youth players: Cameron Ferguson, Charlie Wiggett and Remi Savage. Interim academy manager Steve Harper credited Baker and his recruitment team for their work in bringing the players to the club.

Baker has continued to work within Newcastle's academy scouting and recruitment structure.

== Honours ==
=== Player ===
Hartlepool United

- Football League Fourth Division promotion: 1990–91

=== Manager ===
Newcastle Benfield

- Northern League Cup: 2006–07
