= Hartlepool United F.C. =

Association football club in Hartlepool, England

Hartlepool United
- Full name: Hartlepool United Football Club
- Nicknames: Pools; Monkey Hangers
- Founded: 1908; 118 years ago
- Ground: Victoria Park
- Capacity: 7,858
- Owner: Landon Smith
- Chairman: Landon Smith
- Manager: Pete Wild
- League: National League
- 2025–26: National League, 9th of 24
- Website: hartlepoolunited.co.uk
Home colours	Away colours	Third colours

Hartlepool United Football Club is a professional association football club based in Hartlepool, County Durham, England. The team competes in the National League, the fifth level of the English football league system.

They were founded in 1908 as the Hartlepools United Football & Athletic Club Company Ltd. West Hartlepool F.C. won the FA Amateur Cup in 1905 and after the club was dissolved in 1910 its assets and liabilities were subsequently taken over by Hartlepools United, who were then playing in the North Eastern League. Hartlepools United were elected into the Football League in 1921 and spent the next 37 years in the Third Division North, at which point they were placed into the new Fourth Division. In 1968, they were renamed Hartlepool due to the merger of West Hartlepool with the town of Hartlepool and the village of Hart, forming the new Borough of Hartlepool. The club won promotion in 1967–68 for the first time, though were relegated out of the Third Division the following season. In 1977, they were renamed again, to Hartlepool United. They won another promotion in 1990–91, though were relegated in 1993–94. They won further promotions out of the fourth tier in 2002–03 and 2006–07, having been relegated again in 2005–06 after losing the 2005 League One play-off final to Sheffield Wednesday in the previous season. Hartlepool were relegated again in 2012–13 and ended their 96-year run in the Football League with relegation into the National League in 2016–17. Hartlepool achieved promotion back to the Football League in 2020–21, beating Torquay United in the 2021 National League play-off final. However, Hartlepool returned to the National League after two seasons following relegation in 2022–23.

Hartlepool have played home games at Victoria Park throughout their history. Their main rival is Darlington. Between 1924 and 1984, Hartlepool had to apply for re-election on fourteen occasions (a record) in the fourth tier of English football; however, they were not relegated from this level until 2017. The club is also known for being the one where Brian Clough started his managerial career. Ritchie Humphreys holds the record for most appearances for the club, having made 543 appearances, while their leading scorer is Joshie Fletcher with 111 goals.

== History ==
=== 1908–1946: early years and establishment in the Football League ===
Hartlepool United's origins can be traced back to 1881 when West Hartlepool Amateur Football Club were founded, later joining as founder members of the Durham FA in 1883. In 1889, West Hartlepool subsequently joined the new Northern League before winning the FA Amateur Cup in 1905, beating Clapton 3–2. Partly as a result of this victory, the opportunity for a professional football team arose in 1908, when West Hartlepool Rugby Club went bankrupt, leaving their stadium, the Victoria Ground vacant. The stadium was bought and the current club was founded under the name The Hartlepools United Football & Athletic Club Company Ltd on 1 June 1908, representing both the town of West Hartlepool and the original settlement of Hartlepool, known locally as "Old Hartlepool". In their first season, they won the major regional trophy, the Durham Challenge Cup and retained it the following year as well as entering the FA Cup, in which they were drawn to play the local amateur club, West Hartlepool, with whom they shared the Victoria Ground. Hartlepools won 2–1 in the first qualifying round only to go out in the second, beaten by South Bank after a replay. They also entered the North-Eastern League, finished fourth in their initial season, and remained members of that league until 1920–21; their best season was 1910–11, when they finished third. In June 1910, the amateur West Hartlepool team folded, with their assets being taken over by Hartlepools. In 1921, the Football League agreed to form a Northern Section of the Third Division to complement the existing Third Division which contained only southern-based teams. Hartlepools were among the 18 applicants accepted as members. On 27 August 1921, Hartlepools played their first ever Football League match, defeating Wrexham 2–0. In 1921–22, Hartlepools finished their first Football League campaign in 4th place. Two seasons later, Hartlepools came 21st in the table, so were obliged to apply for re-election to the League; they and bottom club Barrow were elected unopposed. In the 1935–36 season, the club reached the third round of the FA Cup for the first time. Drawn against Grimsby Town, they held the First Division club to a goalless draw, but lost the replay. By the time the Second World War put a temporary end to competitive football, they had spent 18 consecutive seasons in the Third Division North, courtesy of two more successful applications for re-election.

=== 1946–1969: FA Cup runs and first promotion ===
Chart of yearly table positions of Hartlepool in the Football League.

In the mid-1950s, Hartlepools enjoyed improved performances in both league and cup competition. In the FA Cup, they reached the fourth round for the first time in 1954–55, losing to Nottingham Forest in a replay after extra time. The following season, they lost 1–0 to reigning First Division champions Chelsea in the third round. At the same stage of the 1956–57 competition, in front of a record Victoria Ground attendance of 17,426, they came back from 3–0 down with top scorer Ken Johnson struggling with injury to equalise against Manchester United's "Busby Babes" before the top-flight club scored a late winner. Those three league seasons brought top-six finishes, culminating in what remains the club's record high of second place in 1956–57, when only the champions, Derby County, were promoted. They dropped into the bottom six in 1958, which meant they were placed in the Fourth Division when the regional sections were merged into nationwide third and fourth tiers. Despite this, in 1959, Hartlepools defeated Barrow 10–1, the current club record victory in a league match. However, Hartlepools did not fare well in the fourth tier. After five consecutive applications for re-election and with the club in financial difficulties, they appointed the 30-year-old Brian Clough in October 1965 to his first managerial role. He and assistant Peter Taylor, aided by a change of chairmanship, built a team that finished eighth in 1966–67. Clough gave his future European Cup winning captain John McGovern his professional debut for Hartlepools aged 16. Although Clough and Taylor then left for Derby County, the team maintained their form, finished third, and won promotion for the first time in the club's history in 1967–68. To better represent the new borough formed by the recent amalgamation of the adjacent boroughs of Hartlepool and West Hartlepool, the board decided the club would be called Hartlepool Association Football Club instead.

=== 1969–1997: re-elections and stagnation in the Fourth Division ===
Hartlepool's foray into the Third Division lasted just one season, finishing 22nd. Under Len Ashurst (who became manager in 1971), the team slowly began to revive after years of largely indifferent form. After Ashurst departed for Gillingham, the club reached the League Cup fourth round in 1974–75 for the first and only time under Ken Hale, where they lost a replay to eventual winners Aston Villa. However, 1976–77 saw a return to the doldrums; Hale was sacked but his successor, Billy Horner, could not improve the team's form, with Hartlepool finishing in 22nd place. Again there was a strong challenger from non-League in the form of Wimbledon; however, as the club was seeking re-election for the first time in six years, it was Workington – bottom for a second successive year – that made way. Over the close season the team's name was changed to its current form of Hartlepool United. In 1977–78, the first season under that name, the team reached the fourth round of the FA Cup again. By the time automatic promotion and relegation between the Football Conference and the League was introduced in 1986–87, Hartlepool had made a record eleven applications for re-election to the Fourth Division, which added to the three in the pre-war Northern Section made fourteen, also a league record, all of which had been successful.

After a poor start to the 1989–90 season, the appointment of Cyril Knowles meant Pools achieved a remarkable turnaround. After avoiding relegation, Hartlepool were in play-off contention with the partnership of Paul Baker and Joe Allon. However, in February 1991, Knowles was diagnosed with brain cancer. Alan Murray was put in temporary charge, where Pools' form would improve further. Joe Allon's 28 goals helped them gain promotion via a third-place finish in 1990–91 which was confirmed with a 3–1 win against Northampton Town. This time their stay lasted three seasons. In 1992–93, Hartlepool defeated Crystal Palace 1–0 in the FA Cup third round – the first time that Hartlepool had beaten a top division side in its history. It was revealed shortly after the cup win that the club were in financial difficulties. To make ends meet, a number of players were released or sold, and the club set an unenviable record by going 1,227 minutes without scoring. The club eventually escaped relegation, finishing 16th but were relegated back to the fourth tier in the following season.

=== 1997–present: success under IOR and relegation from the Football League ===

The Hartlepool team that beat Torquay United in the 2021 National League play-off final 5–4 on penalties after a 1–1 draw.

In 1997, Harold Hornsey sold the club to IOR Ltd, with Ken Hodcroft becoming chairman. After narrowly avoiding relegation to the Conference in 1999, the appointment of Chris Turner turned around the club's fortunes. Three consecutive defeats in the semi-finals of the play-offs preceded promotion in 2002–03 as runners-up, narrowly missing out on the title to Rushden & Diamonds. Hartlepool then achieved their highest finishing position since the introduction of the four-division structure, coming sixth in the third tier in both 2003–04 and 2004–05 under Neale Cooper. In the latter season, they reached the play-off final but lost out to Sheffield Wednesday after extra time. Relegated in 2006, they bounced straight back as runners-up in what was by then League Two. Promotion was confirmed with an away win at Wycombe Wanderers but they missed out on the title on the final day to Walsall.

They would spend six years in the third tier before being relegated in 2012–13. They came close to automatic relegation to non-League in 2014–15 before a late recovery to finish 22nd. June 2015 saw a change of ownership, IOR handing over to Essex recruitment firm JPNG, which appointed director Gary Coxall as chairman. But two years later, they were relegated from League Two after 96 years in the Football League. Needing to win their final match of the season and hope Newport County did not, Hartlepool came from behind to beat title-chasing Doncaster Rovers; however, Newport produced an 89th-minute winner to secure their own safety at Hartlepool's expense. By November 2017, financial legacy issues from JPNG intensified, with the club narrowly avoiding liquidation after being bought by local businessman Raj Singh in April 2018. Hartlepool ultimately finished a turbulent first season in non-League in 15th place. After four years, they returned to the Football League via the play-offs, defeating Torquay United on penalties in the 2021 National League play-off final. In Hartlepool's first season back in the EFL, they finished 17th and reached the EFL Trophy semi-finals for the first time, losing on penalties to Rotherham United. However, in 2022–23, the club were relegated back to the National League after only two seasons in the fourth tier. The club was placed up for sale in April 2023 before being sold in December 2025 to American businessman Landon Smith. Singh's tenure saw a high turnover of managers with 14 managerial changes during a near eight year ownership.

== Recent seasons ==
Statistics from the previous decade. For a full history see; List of Hartlepool United F.C. seasons

Year	League	Level	Pld	W	D	L	GF	GA	GD	Pts	Position	FA Cup	League Cup	EFL Trophy	FA Trophy	Average attendance
2015–16	League Two	4	46	15	6	25	49	72	−23	51	16th of 24	R3	R2	R1(N)	-	3,890
2016–17	League Two	4	46	11	13	22	54	75	−21	46	23rd of 24; Relegated	R2	R1	Group stage	-	3,788
2017–18	National League	5	46	14	14	18	53	63	−10	56	15th of 24	R1	-	-	R1	3,350
2018–19	National League	5	46	15	14	17	56	62	−6	59	16th of 24	R1	-	-	R2	3,124
2019–20	National League	5	39	14	13	12	56	50	+6	55	12th of 24 (Note: The 2019–20 football season was disrupted by the effects of the COVID-19 pandemic. The National League was suspended in mid-March 2020 and the clubs voted six weeks later to end the regular season programme. Teams had not all played the same number of matches, so it was agreed to construct final league tables on an unweighted points per game basis. Hartlepool United were placed 12th; moving down from 9th place.)	R3	-	-	R1	3,355
2020–21	National League	5	42	22	10	10	66	43	+23	76	4th of 22; Promoted (Note: In October 2020 due to ongoing financial issues, Macclesfield Town were expelled from the National League. Furthermore, also due to financial issues inflicted by COVID-19, Dover Athletic were unable to complete their fixtures. Therefore, only 42 fixtures were played instead of the intended 46.)	R1	-	-	R3	N/A (Note: Due to the ongoing disruption caused by the COVID-19 pandemic, all but two home fixtures (against Weymouth and Bromley) were played behind closed doors.)
2021–22	League Two	4	46	14	12	20	44	64	−20	54	17th of 24	R4	R1	SF	-	5,195
2022–23	League Two	4	46	9	16	21	52	78	−26	43	23rd of 24; Relegated	R3	R1	GS	-	4,676
2023–24	National League	5	46	17	9	20	70	82	−12	60	12th of 24	QR4	-	-	R4	4,149
2024–25	National League	5	46	14	18	14	59	62	−3	60	11th of 24	QR4	-	-	R3	3,579
2025–26	National League	5	46	18	14	14	54	59	−5	68	9th of 24	QR4	-	-	R3	3,770

== Club identity ==
=== Colours and crest ===
Hartlepool have primarily played in blue and white vertical stripes throughout their history. From 1908 until 1911, Hartlepools initially wore white shirts with blue and white socks. In 1912, Hartlepools then adopted the blue and white stripes. From the mid-1960s to mid 1970s, the club's strip was often solely blue. In the 1990s, Hartlepool often played in light blue with white before returning to dark blue with white towards the end of the decade.

The first time that a crest appeared on the kit was in 1959, the crest was a shield with the club's initials. However, this would not last long as a crest would not appear on the kits again until the 1970s. From 1974, Hartlepool wore a variety of badges featuring a hart, taken from the logo of the newly enlarged town. In the early 1990s, a modern and abstract image of the hart was used. In 1995, the new ownership under local businessman Harold Hornsey ran a competition for a new logo. The winning design featured a ship's wheel, reflecting the maritime identity of the town. The club reverted to a design with a hart in 2017, standing on water as a heraldic pun on Hart-le-pool. The club said that the 1995 logo did not reflect the club's history, and that the ship's wheel was difficult to replicate in digital and printed media.

=== Sponsorship ===
Meyba currently manufactures the club's apparel. The current home shirt sponsor is Workwear Express.

Table of kit suppliers and shirt sponsors appear below:

Period	Kit manufacturer	Shirt sponsor
1975–77	Umbro	none
1977–78	Bukta	none
1978–80	Admiral	none
1980–81	Le Coq Sportif	none
1981–82	Umbro	none
1982–83	Spall	none
1983–84	Admiral	New County
1984–85	Umbro	Cameron's Brewery
1985–88	Spall	Cameron's Brewery
1988–90	Scoreline	Cameron's Brewery
1990–91	none	Yuill
1991–92	Bukta	Heritage Homes
1992–93	Umbro	Heritage Homes
1993–95	Loki	Cameron's Brewery
1995–99	1908 Gold	Cameron's Brewery
1999–2000	Super League	Cameron's Brewery
2000–02	1908 Gold	DNO International
2002–04	TFG Sports	DNO International
2004–15	Nike	Dove Energy
2015–17	Nike	Seneca Homes
2017–19	BLK	Utility Alliance
2019–20	O'Neill's	Utility Alliance
2020–21	O'Neill's	Prestige Group
2021–22	O'Neill's	Orangebox Training Solutions
2022–23	Erreà	Suit Direct
2023–24	Erreà	Prestige Group
2024–25	Erreà	Workwear Express
2025–26	Meyba	Prestige Group
2026–	Meyba	Workwear Express

== Ground ==
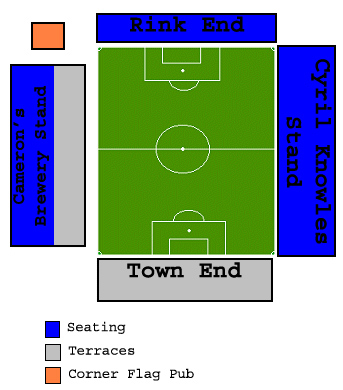
A diagram of Victoria Park

The home of Hartlepool United has been Victoria Park since the club's formation in 1908. The ground is currently under the ownership of Hartlepool Borough Council. The capacity of the ground is 7,856. The four stands of the ground are the Brunel Group Stand/Town End (1,599 capacity), the Teesside Airport Neale Cooper Stand (1,617 seated and 1,832 standing), the Rink End/Simpson Millar Stand - which is used for away supporters (1,003 capacity) and the Longbranch Homes Cyril Knowles Stand (1,775 capacity).

West Hartlepool Rugby Club bought the Victoria Park land from the North Eastern Railway Company in 1886 which was by then allotments. The land had once been a limestone quarry. The ground was named in celebration of Queen Victoria's Diamond Jubilee. The club's first fixture at the Victoria Ground was on 2 September 1908, a 6–0 win against a Newcastle United team. Hartlepools initially shared the ground with West Hartlepool before they were dissolved in 1910, with their assets being taken over by Hartlepools. In 1916, the stand on Clarence Road (the current location of the Cyril Knowles Stand) was bombed by a German Zeppelin and was completely destroyed. The club attempted to claim compensation from the German government but failed. A temporary stand was introduced and was used until the Cyril Knowles Stand was completed in 1995 in memory of former manager Cyril Knowles who had died in 1991. In June 1948, new terracing was added to the Victoria Ground.

Under Harold Hornsey's ownership, a new covered terrace was built, with the ground renamed as Victoria Park. In September 1998, West Hartlepool Rugby Club started a ground share which lasted for a year. By September 2010, owners IOR claimed to have invested over £12 million in the ground during their tenure. Following the death of former manager Neale Cooper in 2018, the Cameron's Brewery Stand was renamed in his memory. In June 2021, owner Raj Singh and Hartlepool Borough Council signed a memorandum of understanding to begin a long-term project of development of Victoria Park and the nearby area. Singh claimed that Victoria Park's capacity could be extended to 15,000 as part of the project.

Due to sponsorship reasons, the ground was formerly named as the Northern Gas and Power Stadium (2016–17) and the Super 6 Stadium (2018–19). On 12 November 2021, it was announced that the stadium would be named the 'Suit Direct Stadium' after a three-year partnership was signed with the menswear high street retailer Suit Direct. The stadium was named as the 'Prestige Group Stadium' for the 2024–25 season.

== Popular culture ==
=== Andy Capp ===
The comic strip Andy Capp, which was created by Hartlepool native Reg Smythe, has referred specifically to the team and the Cyril Knowles stand.

=== Monkey hangers ===
According to local folklore, the term monkey hanger originates from a likely apocryphal incident in which a monkey was hanged in Hartlepool during the Napoleonic Wars. According to the legend, a French chasse-marée was wrecked in a storm off the coast of Hartlepool. The only survivor from the ship was a monkey, allegedly dressed in a French Army uniform to provide amusement for the crew. On finding the monkey on the beach, a group of locals decided to hold an impromptu trial. Because the monkey was unable to answer their questions, and because they had seen neither a monkey nor a Frenchman before, they concluded that the monkey must be a French spy. Being found guilty, the animal was duly sentenced to death and summarily hanged on the beach.

The people of Hartlepool therefore gained the nickname of monkey hangers which has subsequently been adopted by the football club. In 1999, the club's mascot H'Angus the Monkey was introduced.

==== Mascot elected mayor ====
In the 2002 council election, the team's mascot "H'Angus the Monkey", aka Stuart Drummond, was elected mayor of Hartlepool as an independent, under the slogan "free bananas for schoolchildren". Even though his candidacy was originally a publicity stunt, Drummond was re-elected after resigning as mascot and identifying himself increasingly with the Labour group on the council. On 5 May 2013, Drummond left his post of Hartlepool's mayor after a November 2012 referendum abolished the position, with the council instead being led by committees.

== Supporters and rivalries ==
In 2003, market research company FFC surveyed fans of every Football League club across the country to find who they consider their main rivals to be. Hartlepool United fans chose Darlington as their main rivals. Additionally, in 2008, 95% of both clubs named each other as their biggest rivals. Between the two clubs, Hartlepool have won 60 games, compared to Darlington's 57 games in the rivalry. However, the two clubs haven't met since 2007 in a League meeting due to Darlington's financial issues and subsequent relegations. Hartlepool's other rivals according to the 2003 report include: Sheffield Wednesday, Carlisle United, Rushden & Diamonds (now extinct) and Sunderland respectively.

In 2015, a Hartlepool United's Supporters Trust was founded with the intention of "articulating the views of Hartlepool United supporters, lobby the club and provide the basis for some element of fan involvement and influence with the football club."

=== Famous fans ===
In recent years the most visible fan of the club has been Jeff Stelling, the former presenter of Soccer Saturday on Sky Sports. Stelling is currently Club President (2018–) and formerly Honorary President of the Hartlepool United Supporters' Trust (2017–2018). Janick Gers, of the metal band Iron Maiden, is a season ticket holder in the Neale Cooper Stand. Cricket umpire Michael Gough is also a fan of the club and in January 2021 was appointed Honorary President of the Hartlepool United Supporters' Trust.

In 2003, rock star Meat Loaf said on Soccer AM he was a fan of Hartlepool. On So Graham Norton later in the same year, he spoke about his support for the club and brought a cuddly H'Angus toy on the show. It was reported in the media that he was looking to purchase a house in the town. Speaking to Setanta Sports News in 2008, he commented on Hartlepool's recent victory but said that while amusing, the story about him looking to buy a house in the town was not true. In an interview with Talksport in 2010, Meat Loaf confirmed he still followed Hartlepool's results. Following his death in January 2022, the club paid tribute to Meat Loaf.

== Records and statistics ==
The record for most appearances for Hartlepool is held by Ritchie Humphreys, who played 543 matches in all competitions between 2001 and 2013. Joshie Fletcher is the club's top goalscorer with 111 goals in all competitions. The first player to be capped at international level while playing for Hartlepool was Ambrose Fogarty, when he played for the Republic of Ireland against Spain in 1964.

Hartlepool's largest league victory was a 10–1 win over Barrow in the Fourth Division in 1959, while the heaviest loss was 10–0 to Middlesbrough U21s in 2026 in the National League Cup. Their widest winning margin in the FA Cup was a 10–1 win against St Peters Albion in 1923. Hartlepool's record defeat in the FA Cup was by 6–0 against Manchester City in 1976 and Port Vale in 1994.

The club's highest attendance at Victoria Park was 17,264 against Manchester United in 1957. The lowest attendance was 380 in the EFL Trophy against Rochdale in 2016. The record attendance of any Hartlepool game was 59,808 at the Millennium Stadium, Cardiff for the 2005 Football League One play-off final. Hartlepool's highest average attendance during a league season was 9,248 during the 1951–52 season.

The youngest player to play for the club is David Foley, who was 16 years and 44 days on his debut against Port Vale in the Football League Second Division on 25 August 2003. The oldest player is Dimitrios Konstantopoulos, who played his last match aged 41 years and 15 days against Harrogate Town in the FA Trophy on 14 December 2019.

=== Club records ===
As of the end of the 2025–26 season

- Best FA Cup performance: Fourth round, 1954–55, 1977–78, 1988–89, 1992–93, 2004–05, 2008–09, 2021–22
- Best League Cup performance: Fourth round, 1974–75
- Best EFL Trophy performance: Semi-final, 2021–22
- Best FA Trophy performance: Fourth round, 2023–24
- Highest league finish: 2nd in Third Division North, equivalent to 47th in the English football league system, 1956–57
- Seasons spent at level 3 of the football league system: 43
- Seasons spent at level 4 of the football league system: 48
- Seasons spent at level 5 of the football league system: 7

=== Most appearances ===
Rank	Player	Apps	Goals	Position	Career
1	Ritchie Humphreys	543	37	DF, MF	2001–2013
2	Watty Moore	472	3	DF	1948–1960
3	Nicky Featherstone	463	28	MF	2014–2023, 2023–2025
4	Antony Sweeney	444	62	MF	2001–2014
5	Ray Thompson	423	3	DF	1947–1958
6	Alan Goad	418	11	DF	1967–1978
7	Ken Johnson	413	106	FW	1949–1964
8	Brian Honour	384	36	MF	1985–1994
9	Micky Barron	374	4	DF	1996–2007
10	Gary Liddle	364	21	DF, MF	2006–2012, 2019–2020, 2020–2022

== Players ==
=== First-team squad ===
As of 31 October 2026

Note: Flags indicate national team as defined under FIFA eligibility rules; some limited exceptions apply. Players may hold more than one non-FIFA nationality.

No.	Pos.	Nation	Player
1	GK	ENG	Max Merrick (on loan from Chelsea)
2	DF	ENG	Jay Benn
3	DF	ENG	Cameron John
4	MF	ENG	Jack Hunter
5	DF	CMR	Maxim Kouogun
6	DF	ENG	Reiss McNally
7	DF	ENG	Brooklyn Ilunga
8	MF	ENG	Jamie Miley
9	FW	ENG	Jordan Hugill
10	FW	ENG	Will Harris
11	FW	ENG	Luke Charman
12	DF	ENG	Neo Eccleston
14	MF	ENG	Nathan Sheron
15	DF	ENG	Charlie Penman
17	MF	ENG	Jack Nolan

No.	Pos.	Nation	Player
18	MF	WAL	Owen Hampson
19	FW	WAL	Chris Popov
21	MF	ENG	Charlie Thornton
23	DF	ENG	Noah Gilbraith
24	MF	ENG	Jacob Penprase
26	GK	ENG	Harry Conyard
27	DF	ENG	Liam Gibson
28	MF	ENG	Corey McKeown
30	FW	ENG	Terry Bondo
32	GK	ENG	Nathan Fisher
40	GK	ENG	Adam Smith
42	MF	ENG	Cole Deeming (on loan from West Bromwich Albion)
52	DF	ENG	Max Clark
55	DF	ENG	Sam Lavelle (on loan from Grimsby Town)

=== Out on loan ===
Note: Flags indicate national team as defined under FIFA eligibility rules; some limited exceptions apply. Players may hold more than one non-FIFA nationality.

No.	Pos.	Nation	Player
20	FW	ENG	Josh Donaldson (on loan at Hebburn Town until January 2027)
22	DF	ENG	Campbell Darcy (on loan at Hebburn Town until January 2027)
29	FW	ENG	Kian Foreman (on loan at Stockton Town until January 2027)

=== Retired numbers ===
Note: Flags indicate national team as defined under FIFA eligibility rules; some limited exceptions apply. Players may hold more than one non-FIFA nationality.

No.	Pos.	Nation	Player
25	MF	ENG	Michael Maidens (2004–2007)

On 19 October 2007, Hartlepool's midfielder Michael Maidens died in a road traffic accident aged 20 years old. In honour of Maidens, the club retired his number 25 shirt. Furthermore, the annual Goal of the Season award was named after Maidens, who won the award himself in 2005–06 for his long-range strike against Huddersfield Town. Annually, the club's supporters applaud in the 25th minute of the game closest to the anniversary of his death.

=== Notable former players ===
For all players with a Wikipedia article see Hartlepool United F.C. players

== Hartlepool United Women ==
In 2015, a Hartlepool United Ladies team was launched. They participate in the North East Regional Women's Football League Division One North and are managed by Ben Garrity.

== Club officials ==
Board and leadership team

As of 2 January 2026

- Owner: Landon Smith
- Commercial & Operations Director: Rose Stoker
- Club Secretary: Tom Crawford

Coaching and medical staff

As of 01 October 2026

- Head coach: Pete Wild
- Assistant head coach: Dave Conlon
- First-team coach: Adam Clayton
- First-team coach: Gary Liddle
- Head of recruitment: Chris Beech
- First-team physiotherapist: Danny O'Connor
- Head of performance: Danny Nye
- Head of analysis: Sam Clifton
- First-team kit manager: Lee Sweeney
- Academy manager: Alex Cross
- Club doctors: David Russell and Dan Palmer

== Honours ==
League

- Third Division North (level 3)
  - Runners-up: 1956–57
- Fourth Division / Third Division / League Two (level 4)
  - Runners-up: 2002–03, 2006–07
  - Promoted: 1967–68, 1990–91
- National League (level 5)
  - Play-off winners: 2021

Cup

- FA Amateur Cup
  - Winners: 1904–05
- Durham Challenge Cup
  - Winners: 1908–09, 1909–10, 1956–57, 1957–58, 2004–05

== See also ==
- History of Hartlepool United F.C.
- List of Hartlepool United F.C. seasons
- List of Hartlepool United F.C. managers
- List of Hartlepool United F.C. records and statistics
- Victoria Park (Hartlepool)
- Hartlepool United Women

== Other sources ==
- Timeline of events from Pools Stats (archived)
- Manager History from Soccerbase (archived)
- Season by Season record from In the Mad Crowd (archived)
- Law, Ed, Hartlepool United, (Derby; Breedon Books, 1989), ISBN 0-907969-57-7.
