= 2010–11 Hartlepool United F.C. season =

Hartlepool United
2010–11 season
- Owner: IOR
- Chairman: Ken Hodcroft
- Manager: Chris Turner (until 19 August); Mick Wadsworth (from 19 August)
- Football League One: 16th
- FA Cup: Third round (eliminated by Watford)
- Football League Cup: Second round (eliminated by Wigan Athletic)
- Football League Trophy: Third round (eliminated by Sheffield Wednesday)
- Top goalscorer: League: Antony Sweeney (9); All: Antony Sweeney (14)
- Highest home attendance: 4,084 (vs Sheffield Wednesday)
- Lowest home attendance: 1,359 (vs Northampton Town)
- Average home league attendance: 2,933
- Biggest win: 4–0 (vs. Northampton Town)
- Biggest defeat: 5–0 (vs. Sheffield Wednesday)
Home colours	Away colours	Third colours

The 2010–11 season was Hartlepool United's 102nd season in existence and their fourth consecutive season in League One since promotion in 2006–07. Along with competing in League One, the club will also participate in the FA Cup, League Cup and League Trophy. The season covers the period from 1 July 2010 to 30 June 2011.

== Players ==
As of End of Season.

=== First-team squad ===
Note: Flags indicate national team as defined under FIFA eligibility rules; some limited exceptions apply. Players may hold more than one non-FIFA nationality.

No.	Pos.	Nation	Player
1	GK	ENG	Scott Flinders
2	DF	ENG	Neil Austin
3	MF	ENG	Ritchie Humphreys
4	MF	ENG	Gary Liddle
5	DF	ENG	Sam Collins
6	DF	ENG	Evan Horwood
7	MF	IRL	Leon McSweeney
8	MF	IRL	Joe Gamble
9	FW	IRL	Denis Behan
10	FW	ENG	Adam Boyd
11	MF	ENG	Andy Monkhouse
12	MF	URU	Fabian Yantorno
14	FW	ENG	James Brown
15	MF	ENG	Antony Sweeney
16	DF	ENG	Steven Haslam

No.	Pos.	Nation	Player
18	FW	ENG	Michael Mackay
19	MF	NOR	Jon André Fredriksen
20	MF	ENG	Paul Murray
21	GK	ENG	Andy Rafferty
22	DF	ISL	Ármann Björnsson
23	FW	ENG	Colin Larkin
24	FW	ENG	Billy Greulich
26	DF	ENG	Paul Johnson
27	DF	ENG	Dylan Purvis
28	MF	ENG	Billy Blackford
29	DF	ENG	Peter Hartley
30	MF	ENG	Callum Martin
31	GK	ENG	Liam Mooney
37	DF	ENG	Darren Holden
38	DF	ENG	Josh Rowbotham

== Transfers ==
=== Transfers in ===
Date	Position	Player	From	Fee	Ref
14 May 2010	GK	Andy Rafferty	Guisborough Town	Free	
30 July 2010	DF	Evan Horwood	Carlisle United	Free	
5 August 2010	MF	Paul Murray	Shrewsbury Town	Free	
6 August 2010	MF	Fabián Yantorno	Atenas	Free	

=== Transfers out ===
Date	Position	Player	To	Fee	Ref
10 June 2010	MF	Alan Power	Rushden & Diamonds	Free	
14 June 2010	DF	Ben Clark	Gateshead	Free	
7 July 2010	MF	Ritchie Jones	Oldham Athletic	Free	
7 July 2010	MF	Jonny Rowell	Olympic Chaleroi	Free	
6 October 2010	DF	Julian Cherel	Mansfield Town	Free	

== Results ==
=== League One ===
==== League table ====
Pos	Team	Pld	W	D	L	GF	GA	GD	Pts
14	Yeovil Town	46	16	11	19	56	66	−10	59
15	Sheffield Wednesday	46	16	10	20	67	67	0	58
16	Hartlepool United	46	15	12	19	47	65	−18	57
17	Oldham Athletic	46	13	17	16	53	60	−7	56
18	Tranmere Rovers	46	15	11	20	53	60	−7	56

Updated to match(es) played on 2 May 2011. Source: BBC
Rules for classification: 1) points; 2) goal difference; 3) number of goals scored.

==== Results summary ====
Overall								Home						Away					
Pld	W	D	L	GF	GA	GD	Pts	W	D	L	GF	GA	GD	W	D	L	GF	GA	GD
46	15	12	19	47	65	−18	57	9	6	8	32	32	0	6	6	11	15	33	−18

==== Results by matchday ====
Round	1	2	3	4	5	6	7	8	9	10	11	12	13	14	15	16	17	18	19	20	21	22	23	24	25	26	27	28	29	30	31	32	33	34	35	36	37	38	39	40	41	42	43	44	45	46
Ground	A	H	A	H	A	H	A	H	H	A	H	A	H	A	H	A	A	A	A	H	A	H	A	A	H	A	H	A	H	H	H	A	H	H	A	H	H	A	H	A	H	A	H	A	H	A
Result	D	D	W	L	L	L	D	W	L	W	W	L	D	D	W	L	W	W	W	W	L	L	D	L	D	L	W	L	W	L	D	W	L	W	L	W	L	L	L	D	W	L	D	L	D	D
Position	13	15	9	13	16	20	20	16	19	18	15	17	18	17	14	19	14	12	10	7	8	13	12	14	14	14	11	13	12	14	14	12	13	10	11	8	8	10	12	14	13	14	13	15	18	16

Source: Statto.com
A = Away; H = Home; W = Win; D = Draw; L = Loss

==== Results ====
7 August 2010	Rochdale	0–0	Hartlepool United	Rochdale
15:00				Stadium: Spotland Stadium; Attendance: 3,706

14 August 2010	Hartlepool United	2–2	Swindon Town	Hartlepool
15:00	Boyd 4'; Sweeney 12'		Dossevi 72'; Austin 74'	Stadium: Victoria Park; Attendance: 2,893

21 August 2010	Yeovil Town	0–2	Hartlepool United	Yeovil
15:00			Liddle 30'; Monkhouse 54'	Stadium: Huish Park; Attendance: 3,537

28 August 2010	Hartlepool United	0–5	Sheffield Wednesday	Hartlepool
15:00			Murray 8' (o.g.); Coke 10'; Mellor 23'; Tudgay 73' (pen.); Morrison 90'	Stadium: Victoria Park; Attendance: 4,084

4 September 2010	MK Dons	1–0	Hartlepool United	Milton Keynes
12:15	Guy 77'; Lewington (red card) 84'			Stadium: Stadium:mk; Attendance: 7,656

11 September 2010	Hartlepool United	2–3	Exeter City	Hartlepool
15:00	Humphreys 38'; Sweeney 42'		Harley 12'; O'Flynn 48', 57'	Stadium: Victoria Park; Attendance: 2,641

18 September 2010	Brentford	0–0	Hartlepool United	Brentford
15:00				Stadium: Griffin Park; Attendance: 4,710

25 September 2010	Hartlepool United	2–1	Walsall	Hartlepool
15:00	Sweeney 43'; Monkhouse 56'		Gray 9'	Stadium: Victoria Park; Attendance: 2,552

28 September 2010	Hartlepool United	0–4	Carlisle United	Hartlepool
19:45			Michalík 8'; Madine 26', 36', 71'	Stadium: Victoria Park; Attendance: 3,419

2 October 2010	Plymouth Argyle	0–1	Hartlepool United	Plymouth
15:00			McSweeney 87'	Stadium: Home Park; Attendance: 7,333

9 October 2010	Hartlepool United	2–0	Peterborough United	Hartlepool
15:00	Hartley 44'; Liddle 90'		Tomlin (red card) 82'	Stadium: Victoria Park; Attendance: 3,047

16 October 2010	Leyton Orient	1–0	Hartlepool United	Leyton
15:00	Téhoué 89'			Stadium: Brisbane Road; Attendance: 3,605

23 October 2010	Hartlepool United	2–2	Bristol Rovers	Hartlepool
15:00	Gamble 29'; Sweeney 79'		Kuffour 85'; Anthony 90'	Stadium: Victoria Park; Attendance: 2,792

30 October 2010	Dagenham & Redbridge	1–1	Hartlepool United	Dagenham
15:00	Hartley 49' (o.g.)		Arber 90' (o.g.)	Stadium: Victoria Road; Attendance: 2,464

13 November 2010	Hartlepool United	3–1	Brighton & Hove Albion	Victoria Park, Hartlepool
15:00	Austin 23'; Liddle 71'; Poole 84'		Dicker 57'; Bridcutt (red card) 77'	Attendance: 3,073

20 November 2010	Colchester United	3–2	Hartlepool United	Colchester Community Stadium, Colchester
15:00	Bond 57'; Odejayi 60'; Henderson 90' (pen.)		Murray 28'; Horwood 88'	Attendance: 3,640

23 November 2010	Tranmere Rovers	0–1	Hartlepool United	Prenton Park, Birkenhead
19:45			Gulasci 77' (o.g.)	Attendance: 4,340

11 December 2010	AFC Bournemouth	0–1	Hartlepool United	Dean Court, Bournemouth
15:00			Brown 31'	Attendance: 6,129

26 December 2010	Huddersfield Town	0–1	Hartlepool United	Galpharm Stadium, Huddersfield
15:00			McSweeney 42'	Attendance: 14,813

1 January 2011	Hartlepool United	4–2	Oldham Athletic	Victoria Park, Hartlepool
15:00	Austin 27' (pen.); Hartley 45'; Humphreys 58'; Sweeney 69'		Stephens 18'; Mvoto 81'	Attendance: 3,411

3 January 2011	Notts County	3–0	Hartlepool United	Meadow Lane, Nottingham
15:00	Ince 44'; Miller 70'; Westcarr 79'			Attendance: 6,285

15 January 2011	Hartlepool United	0–1	Dagenham & Redbridge	Victoria Park, Hartlepool
15:00			Tomlin 86'	Attendance: 2,939

18 January 2011	Bristol Rovers	0–0	Hartlepool United	Memorial Stadium, Bristol
19:45				Attendance: 5,285

22 January 2011	Peterborough United	4–0	Hartlepool United	London Road Stadium, Peterborough
15:00	Mackail-Smith 62'; Rowe 64'; Tomlin 68'; Wesolowski 90'			Attendance: 5,800

25 January 2011	Hartlepool United	1–1	Notts County	Victoria Park, Hartlepool
19:45	Liddle 38'		Hughes 69'	Attendance: 2,545

1 February 2011	Oldham Athletic	4–0	Hartlepool United	Boundary Park, Oldham
19:45	White 7'; Taylor 51'; Evina 69'; Reid 90'			Attendance: 3,056

5 February 2011	Hartlepool United	1–0	Colchester United	Victoria Park, Hartlepool
15:00	Sweeney 88'			Attendance: 2,646

12 February 2011	Brighton & Hove Albion	4–1	Hartlepool United	Withdean Stadium, Brighton
15:00	Wood 12'; Murray 17', 56'; Noone 53'		Sweeney 63'	Attendance: 7,296

15 February 2011	Hartlepool United	2–1	Charlton Athletic	Victoria Park, Hartlepool
19:45	Monkhouse 14'; Liddle 62'		Eccleston 54'	Attendance: 2,289

19 February 2011	Hartlepool United	0–1	MK Dons	Victoria Park, Hartlepool
15:00			Powell 45'	Attendance: 2,620

22 February 2011	Hartlepool United	0–0	Southampton	Victoria Park, Hartlepool
19:45				Attendance: 3,301

26 February 2011	Exeter City	1–2	Hartlepool United	St James Park, Exeter
15:00	Cureton 59'		Monkhouse 21', 29'	Attendance: 4,931

1 March 2011	Hartlepool United	0–1	Huddersfield Town	Victoria Park, Hartlepool
19:45			Pilkington 12'	Attendance: 2,857

5 March 2011	Hartlepool United	3–0	Brentford	Victoria Park, Hartlepool
15:00	Monkhouse 36', 57'; Liddle 83'			Attendance: 2,936

8 March 2011	Carlisle United	1–0	Hartlepool United	Brunton Park, Carlisle
19:45	Zoko 67'			Attendance: 3,898

12 March 2011	Hartlepool United	2–0	Plymouth Argyle	Victoria Park, Hartlepool
15:00	Sweeney 20'; Collins 64'			Attendance: 3,059

15 March 2011	Hartlepool United	0–1	Leyton Orient	Victoria Park, Hartlepool
19:45			Smith 28'	Attendance: 2,313

19 March 2011	Walsall	5–2	Hartlepool United	Bescot Stadium, Walsall
15:00	Grigg 59'; Byfield 64'; Gray 77'; Smith 83'; Ledesma 90+4'		Larkin 21', 52'	Attendance: 4,234

25 March 2011	Hartlepool United	0–2	Rochdale	Victoria Park, Hartlepool
19:45			Jones 23'; Dawson 56'	Attendance: 3,081

2 April 2011	Swindon Town	1–1	Hartlepool United	County Ground, Swindon
15:00	Ritchie 67'		Horwood 37'	Attendance: 7,146

9 April 2011	Hartlepool United	3–1	Yeovil Town	Victoria Park, Hartlepool
15:00	Boyd 18'; Collins 62'; Larkin 69'		Obika 10'	Attendance: 2,834

16 April 2011	Sheffield Wednesday	2–0	Hartlepool United	Hillsborough, Sheffield
15:00	Miller 45+2' (pen.); Madine 65'

22 April 2011	Hartlepool United	1–1	Tranmere Rovers	Victoria Park, Hartlepool
19:45	Sweeney 14'		Jennings 81'	Attendance: 2,969

25 April 2011	Southampton	2–0	Hartlepool United	St Mary's Stadium, Southampton
16:00	Lambert 50' (pen.); Fonte 82'			Attendance: 24,210

30 April 2011	Hartlepool United	2–2	AFC Bournemouth	Victoria Park, Hartlepool
15:00	Boyd 52'; Flinders 90+4'		Lovell 29'; McDermott 38'	Attendance: 3,159

7 May 2011	Charlton Athletic	0–0	Hartlepool United	The Valley, Charlton
15:00				Attendance: 15,804

=== FA Cup ===
6 November 2010 First round	Hartlepool United	0–0	Vauxhall Motors	Hartlepool
15:00		Report		Stadium: Victoria Park; Attendance: 2,381

16 November 2010 replay	Vauxhall Motors	0–1	Hartlepool United	Rivacre Park, Ellesmere Port
19:45			Brown 70'	Attendance: 2,406

14 December 2010 Second round	Hartlepool United	4–2	Yeovil Town	Hartlepool
19:45	Sweeney 35', 40', 59'; Humphreys 49'		A. Williams 18'; Upson 31'	Stadium: Victoria Park; Attendance: 1,914

8 January 2011 Third round	Watford	4–1	Hartlepool United	Watford
15:00	Mingoia 66'; Sordell 68', 82'; Graham 90'		Sweeney 45'	Stadium: Vicarage Road; Attendance: 8,950

=== Football League Cup ===
11 August 2010 First round	Hartlepool United	2–0	Sheffield United	Hartlepool
15:00	Brown 6'; Boyd 61' (pen.)	Report		Stadium: Victoria Park; Attendance: 2,520

24 August 2010 Second round	Hartlepool United	0–3	Wigan Athletic	Hartlepool
15:00			Collins 3' (o.g.); Gómez 76'; Moses 86'	Stadium: Victoria Park; Attendance: 3,196

=== Football League Trophy ===
31 August 2010 First round	Hartlepool United	4–0	Northampton Town	Hartlepool
19:00	Horwood 66'; Sweeney 69'; Monkhouse 71'; Behan 75'	Report		Stadium: Victoria Park; Attendance: 1,359

5 October 2010 Second round	Hartlepool United	1–0	Bradford City	Hartlepool
19:00	McSweeney 69'	Report		Stadium: Victoria Park; Attendance: 1,728

10 November 2010 Third round	Sheffield Wednesday	4–1	Hartlepool United	Sheffield
19:30	Mellor 9', 29', 48' (pen.); Teale 55'	Report	Yantorno 43'	Stadium: Hillsborough; Attendance: 10,909
