= 2009–10 Hartlepool United F.C. season =

Hartlepool United
2009–10 season
- Owner: IOR
- Chairman: Ken Hodcroft
- Manager: Chris Turner
- Stadium: Victoria Park
- Football League One: 20th
- FA Cup: First round (Eliminated by Kettering Town)
- Football League Cup: Second round (Eliminated by Burnley)
- Football League Trophy: First round (Eliminated by Grimsby Town)
- Top goalscorer: League: Andy Monkhouse (11); All: Andy Monkhouse (11)
- Highest home attendance: 5,115 (vs Leeds United)
- Lowest home attendance: 1,675 (vs Grimsby Town)
- Average home league attendance: 3,683
- Biggest win: 4–1 (vs. Carlisle United)
- Biggest defeat: 5–0 (vs. Milton Keynes Dons)
Home colours	Away colours	Third colours

The 2009–10 season was Hartlepool United's 101st year in existence and their third consecutive season in League One. Along with competing in League One, the club also participated in the FA Cup, League Cup and League Trophy. The season covers the period from 1 July 2009 to 30 June 2010.

== Players ==
As of End of Season.

=== First-team squad ===
Note: Flags indicate national team as defined under FIFA eligibility rules; some limited exceptions apply. Players may hold more than one non-FIFA nationality.

No.	Pos.	Nation	Player
1	GK	ENG	Scott Flinders
2	DF	ENG	Neil Austin
3	MF	ENG	Ritchie Humphreys
4	MF	ENG	Gary Liddle
5	DF	ENG	Sam Collins
6	DF	ENG	Ben Clark
7	MF	IRL	Leon McSweeney
8	MF	ENG	Ritchie Jones
9	FW	IRL	Denis Behan
10	FW	ENG	Adam Boyd
11	MF	ENG	Andy Monkhouse
12	FW	ENG	James Brown
14	MF	ENG	Jonny Rowell
15	MF	ENG	Antony Sweeney
16	DF	ENG	Steven Haslam

No.	Pos.	Nation	Player
18	FW	ENG	Michael Mackay
19	MF	NOR	Jon André Fredriksen
20	MF	IRL	Alan Power
21	GK	ENG	Mark Cook
22	FW	ENG	Matty Tymon
23	FW	IRL	Colin Larkin
24	FW	ENG	Billy Greulich
26	FW	ISL	Ármann Björnsson
27	DF	FRA	Julian Cherel
28	DF	ENG	Dylan Purvis
29	DF	ENG	Peter Hartley
30	MF	IRL	Joe Gamble
31	GK	WAL	Nick Thomas
32	FW	IRL	Roy O'Donovan

== Transfers ==
=== Transfers in ===
Date	Position	Player	From	Fee	Ref
2 May 2009	FW	Adam Boyd	Leyton Orient	Undisclosed	
15 May 2009	MF	Leon McSweeney	Stockport County	Undisclosed	
28 May 2009	DF	Peter Hartley	Sunderland	Free	
10 June 2009	DF	Neil Austin	Darlington	Undisclosed	
26 June 2009	GK	Scott Flinders	Crystal Palace	Free	
13 July 2009	MF	Jon André Fredriksen	Sarpsborg	Undisclosed	
20 July 2009	FW	Denis Behan	Cork City	Undisclosed	
6 August 2009	DF	Steven Haslam	Bury	Free	
25 August 2009	FW	Ármann Björnsson	Brann	Undisclosed	
25 September 2009	DF	Julian Cherel	Mondeville	Free	
5 January 2010	MF	Joe Gamble	Cork City	Free	

=== Loans in ===
Date	Position	Player	From	End date	Ref
23 February 2010	FW	Roy O'Donovan	Sunderland	1 June 2010	

=== Transfers out ===
Date	Position	Name	To	Fee	Ref
24 April 2009	FW	Joel Porter	Gold Coast United	Free	
19 June 2009	DF	Michael Nelson	Norwich City	Free	
30 June 2009	DF	Matty Robson	Carlisle United	Free	
21 August 2009	GK	Arran Lee-Barrett	Ipswich Town	Free	
16 September 2009	GK	Jan Budtz	Eastwood Town	Free	
8 October 2009	DF	Jamie McCunnie	East Fife	Free	
21 October 2009	MF	Willie Boland	Retired	—N/a	
15 February 2010	FW	David Foley	Puerto Rico Islanders	Free	

=== Loans out ===
Date	Position	Player	To	End date	Ref
3 August 2009	FW	Michael Mackay	Gateshead	1 January 2010	
15 August 2009	FW	Matty Tymon	Whitby Town	15 September 2009	
21 August 2009	FW	David Foley	Barrow	21 September 2009	

== Results ==
=== Pre-season friendlies ===
13 July 2009 Friendly	FC Volendam	3–2	Hartlepool United	Heiloo
19:00	Sluijter 7', 49'; Kramer 12'	Report	Sweeney 54'; Mackay 60'	Stadium: Sportpark Het Maalwater

15 July 2009 Friendly	Cambuur	4–2	Hartlepool United	Cambuur
19:00	van der Heide 12', 52' ter Heide 62'; Nassir Maachi 71'	Report	Rowell 50'; Monkhouse 84'

21 July 2009 Friendly	Hartlepool United	0–2	Sheffield Wednesday	Hartlepool
19:00		Report	Tudgay 13'; France 19'	Stadium: Victoria Park; Attendance: 1,625

24 July 2009 Friendly	York City	2–0	Hartlepool United	York
19:00	Mackin 55'; Jackson 90'	Report		Stadium: KitKat Crescent; Attendance: 754

30 July 2009 Friendly	Gateshead	1–2	Hartlepool United	Gateshead
19:00	Francis 90'	Report	Monkhouse 20'; Behan 54'	Stadium: Gateshead International Stadium

1 August 2009 Friendly	Mansfield Town	1–2	Hartlepool United	Mansfield
15:00	Clare 23'	Report	McSweeney 38'; Larkin 70'	Stadium: Field Mill; Attendance: 1,798

=== League One ===
==== League table ====
Pos	Team	Pld	W	D	L	GF	GA	GD	Pts	Promotion, qualification or relegation
18	Exeter City	46	11	18	17	48	60	−12	51	
19	Tranmere Rovers	46	14	9	23	45	72	−27	51	
20	Hartlepool United	46	14	11	21	59	67	−8	50 (Note: Hartlepool deducted 3 points for fielding an ineligible player.)	
21	Gillingham (R)	46	12	14	20	48	64	−16	50	Relegation to Football League Two
22	Wycombe Wanderers (R)	46	10	15	21	56	76	−20	45	Relegation to Football League Two

Source: The Football League
Rules for classification: 1) points; 2) goal difference; 3) number of goals scored.
(R) Relegated

==== Results summary ====
Overall								Home						Away					
Pld	W	D	L	GF	GA	GD	Pts	W	D	L	GF	GA	GD	W	D	L	GF	GA	GD
46	14	11	21	59	67	−8	50^{a}	10	6	7	33	26	+7	4	5	14	26	41	−15

^{a} Hartlepool were deducted 3 points for fielding an ineligible player.

==== Results by matchday ====
Round	1	2	3	4	5	6	7	8	9	10	11	12	13	14	15	16	17	18	19	20	21	22	23	24	25	26	27	28	29	30	31	32	33	34	35	36	37	38	39	40	41	42	43	44	45	46
Ground	A	H	H	A	H	A	H	A	H	A	A	H	A	H	A	H	A	H	A	H	A	H	A	H	H	A	A	H	A	H	H	H	A	H	A	A	A	H	A	H	A	H	H	A	H	A
Result	D	L	L	W	L	W	D	L	W	D	L	D	W	W	D	W	L	L	L	W	L	D	L	W	L	L	L	D	L	D	L	W	L	W	L	D	L	L	W	W	L	W	W	L	D	D
Position	12	19	20	18	21	11	13	18	11	12	15	15	13	10	11	9	12	12	11	11	12	12	14	11	12	12	14	14	16	16	20	16	17	15	16	18	19	20	18	16	17	16	15	16	16	20

Source: InTheMadCrowd
A = Away; H = Home; W = Win; D = Draw; L = Loss

==== Results ====
8 August 2009 1	Milton Keynes Dons	0–0	Hartlepool United	Milton Keynes
15:00		Report		Stadium: Stadium MK; Attendance: 8,965; Referee: Keith Hill

15 August 2009 2	Hartlepool United	0–2	Charlton Athletic	Hartlepool
15:00		Report	Burton 23'; Bailey 27'	Stadium: Victoria Park; Attendance: 4,408; Referee: Carl Boyeson

18 August 2009 3	Hartlepool United	1–2	Bristol Rovers	Hartlepool
19:45	Behan 31'	Report	Lescott 39'; Kuffour 45'	Stadium: Victoria Park; Attendance: 3,137; Referee: Karl Evans

22 August 2009 4	Gillingham	0–1	Hartlepool United	Gillingham
15:00		Report	Brown 65'	Stadium: Priestfield Stadium; Attendance: 4,969; Referee: Danny McDermid

29 August 2009 5	Hartlepool United	0–2	Norwich City	Hartlepool
15:00		Report	Nelson 27'; Hughes 64'	Stadium: Victoria Park; Attendance: 4,470; Referee: Scott Mathieson

4 September 2009 6	Oldham Athletic	0–3	Hartlepool United	Oldham
19:45		Report	Brown 21'; McSweeney 37'; Behan 60'	Stadium: Boundary Park; Attendance: 4,014; Referee: Rob Shoebridge

12 September 2009 7	Hartlepool United	1–1	Wycombe Wanderers	Hartlepool
15:00	Boyd 79'	Report	Beavon 50'	Stadium: Victoria Park; Attendance: 3,326; Referee: Scott Mathieson

19 September 2009 8	Colchester United	2–0	Hartlepool United	Colchester
15:00	Lisbie 45' (pen.), 47' (pen.)	Report		Stadium: Weston Homes Community Stadium; Attendance: 4,259; Referee: Andy Woolmer

26 September 2009 9	Hartlepool United	3–0	Walsall	Hartlepool
15:00	Monkhouse 25', 50'; Larkin 75'	Report		Stadium: Victoria Park; Attendance: 3,334; Referee: Dave Foster

29 September 2009 10	Stockport County	2–2	Hartlepool United	Stockport
19:45	Bignall 16'; Raynes 17'	Report	Boyd 51'; Behan 75'	Stadium: Edgeley Park; Attendance: 3,780; Referee: Chris Sarginson

3 October 2009 11	Exeter City	3–1	Hartlepool United	Exeter
15:00	Harley 34'; Fleetwood 62'; Dunne 90'	Report	Behan 23'	Stadium: St James Park; Attendance: 4,706; Referee: James Linington

10 October 2009 12	Hartlepool United	0–0	Brentford	Hartlepool
15:00		Report		Stadium: Victoria Park; Attendance: 3,105; Referee: Graham Salisbury

17 October 2009 13	Swindon Town	0–2	Hartlepool United	Swindon
15:00		Report	Brown 2'; Monkhouse 30'	Stadium: County Ground; Attendance: 7,096; Referee: Trevor Kettle

24 October 2009 14	Hartlepool United	1–0	Tranmere Rovers	Hartlepool
15:00	Hartley 43'	Report		Stadium: Victoria Park; Attendance: 3,428; Referee: Gary Sutton

31 October 2009 15	Brighton and Hove Albion	3–3	Hartlepool United	Brighton
15:00	Dickinson 27'; Forster 39', 48'	Report	Boyd 6'; Monkhouse 43'; Jones 45'	Stadium: Withdean Stadium; Attendance: 5,694; Referee: Pat Miller

14 November 2009 16	Hartlepool United	1–0	Leyton Orient	Hartlepool
15:00	Boyd 81'	Report		Stadium: Victoria Park; Attendance: 3,119; Referee: Craig Pawson

21 November 2009 17	Huddersfield Town	2–1	Hartlepool United	Huddersfield
15:00	Hartley 56' (o.g.); Williams 66'	Report	Liddle 18'	Stadium: Galpharm Stadium; Attendance: 12,518; Referee: Paul Tierney

24 November 2009 18	Hartlepool United	1–3	Southampton	Hartlepool
19:45	Monkhouse 16'	Report	Lallana 29', 53'; Lambert 82'	Stadium: Victoria Park; Attendance: 3,818; Referee: Neil Swarbrick

1 December 2009 19	Carlisle United	3–2	Hartlepool United	Carlisle
15:00	Harte 33'; Taiwo 52'; Robson 63'	Report	Björnsson 5'; Monkhouse 90'	Stadium: Brunton Park; Attendance: 4,109; Referee: Anthony Taylor

5 December 2009 20	Hartlepool United	3–0	Millwall	Hartlepool
15:00	Hartley 12'; Boyd 22'; Björnsson 29'	Report		Stadium: Victoria Park; Attendance: 3,153; Referee: Jock Waugh

12 December 2009 21	Southend United	3–2	Hartlepool United	Southend-on-Sea
15:00	Laurent 49'; Barnard 56', 74'	Report	Boyd 8'; Grant 31' (o.g.)	Stadium: Roots Hall; Attendance: 7,737; Referee: Phil Gibbs

5 December 2009 22	Hartlepool United	1–1	Yeovil Town	Hartlepool
15:00	Monkhouse 67'	Report	Williams 33'	Stadium: Victoria Park; Attendance: 2,778; Referee: Russell Booth

26 December 2009 23	Leeds United	3–1	Hartlepool United	Leeds
15:00	Beckford 38', 69'; Becchio 45'	Report	Boyd 8'; Björnsson 31' (o.g.)	Stadium: Elland Road; Attendance: 30,191; Referee: Eddie Ilderton

2 January 2010 24	Hartlepool United	2–1	Oldham Athletic	Hartlepool
15:00	Jones 32'; Monkhouse 40'	Report	Abbott 88'	Stadium: Victoria Park; Attendance: 2,634; Referee: Carl Boyeson

16 January 2010 25	Hartlepool United	0–5	Milton Keynes Dons	Hartlepool
15:00		Report	Easter 4'; Liddle 22' (o.g.); Leven 54'; Baldock 77'; Puncheon 82'	Stadium: Victoria Park; Attendance: 3,211; Referee: Chris Sarginson

19 January 2010 26	Charlton Athletic	2–1	Hartlepool United	Charlton
19:45	Mooney 31'; Wagstaff 79'	Report	Behan 51' (pen.)	Stadium: The Valley; Attendance: 14,636; Referee: Steve Tanner

23 January 2010 27	Bristol Rovers	2–0	Hartlepool United	Bristol
15:00	Lines 3'; Duffy 66'	Report		Stadium: Memorial Stadium; Attendance: 5,794; Referee: Gavin Ward

26 January 2010 28	Hartlepool United	1–1	Gillingham	Hartlepool
19:45	Austin 79'	Report	Jackson 70'	Stadium: Victoria Park; Attendance: 2,465; Referee: Keith Hill

30 January 2010 29	Norwich City	2–1	Hartlepool United	Norwich
15:00	McDonald 27'; Rose 32'	Report	Austin 26'	Stadium: Carrow Road; Attendance: 25,506; Referee: Paul Taylor

6 February 2010 30	Hartlepool United	2–2	Leeds United	Hartlepool
15:00	Boyd 71'; Sweeney 90'	Report	Becchio 23', 78'	Stadium: Victoria Park; Attendance: 5,115; Referee: Scott Mathieson

20 February 2010 31	Hartlepool United	0–2	Huddersfield Town	Hartlepool
15:00		Report	Roberts 17' (pen.); Novak 66'	Stadium: Victoria Park; Attendance: 4,452; Referee: Anthony Taylor

23 February 2010 32	Hartlepool United	4–1	Carlisle United	Hartlepool
19:45	Jones 6', 74'; Sweeney 28'; Gamble 42'	Report	Dobie 10'	Stadium: Victoria Park; Attendance: 2,975; Referee: Colin Webster

27 February 2010 33	Millwall	1–0	Hartlepool United	Bermondsey
15:00	Harris 9'	Report		Stadium: The Den; Attendance: 10,818; Referee: Mick Russell

6 March 2010 34	Hartlepool United	3–0	Southend United	Hartlepool
15:00	O'Donovan 16', 32', 90'	Report		Stadium: Victoria Park; Attendance: 3,299; Referee: Jock Waugh

13 March 2010 35	Yeovil Town	4–0	Hartlepool United	Yeovil
15:00	Tomlin 20' (pen.); Williams 38'; Collins 50' (o.g.); Bowditch 71'	Report		Stadium: Huish Park; Attendance: 3,169; Referee: Steven Rushton

19 March 2010 36	Tranmere Rovers	0–0	Hartlepool United	Birkenhead
19:45		Report		Stadium: Prenton Park; Attendance: 5,409; Referee: Karl Evans

23 March 2010 37	Southampton	3–2	Hartlepool United	Southampton
19:45	Barnard 13'; Lambert 38'; Waigo 56'	Report	Monkhouse 10'; Austin 57'	Stadium: St Mary's Stadium; Attendance: 18,072; Referee: Andy D'Urso

27 March 2010 38	Hartlepool United	0–1	Swindon Town	Hartlepool
15:00		Report	Austin 22'	Stadium: Victoria Park; Attendance: 3,536; Referee: Michael Oliver

3 April 2010 39	Leyton Orient	1–3	Hartlepool United	Leyton
15:00	Patulea 84'	Report	Liddle 22', 39'; O'Donovan 27'	Stadium: Brisbane Road; Attendance: 3,604; Referee: Andy Penn

5 April 2010 40	Hartlepool United	2–0	Brighton and Hove Albion	Hartlepool
15:00	O'Donovan 54'; Monkhouse 70'	Report		Stadium: Victoria Park; Attendance: 3,466; Referee: Mark Haywood

10 April 2010 41	Wycombe Wanderers	2–0	Hartlepool United	High Wycombe
15:00	Pittman 66'; Phillips 88'	Report		Stadium: Adams Park; Attendance: 4,342; Referee: Darren Sheldrake

13 April 2010 42	Hartlepool United	3–0	Stockport County	Hartlepool
19:45	Gamble 14'; Monkhouse 56'; O'Donovan 90'	Report		Stadium: Victoria Park; Attendance: 2,869; Referee: Andy Hall

17 April 2010 43	Hartlepool United	3–1	Colchester United	Hartlepool
15:00	Brown 11'; O'Donovan 19', 85' (pen.)	Report	Henderson 8'	Stadium: Victoria Park; Attendance: 3,126; Referee: Jonathan Moss

24 April 2010 44	Walsall	3–1	Hartlepool United	Walsall
15:00	Gray 7'; Deeney 29'; Taundry 76'	Report	O'Donovan 27'	Stadium: Banks's Stadium; Attendance: 3,457; Referee: Fred Graham

1 May 2010 45	Hartlepool United	1–1	Exeter City	Hartlepool
15:00	Behan 80'	Report	Taylor 37'	Stadium: Victoria Park; Attendance: 3,983; Referee: Graham Salisbury

8 May 2010 46	Brentford	0–0	Hartlepool United	Brentford
15:00		Report		Stadium: Griffin Park; Attendance: 6,893; Referee: Danny McDermid

=== FA Cup ===
7 November 2009 First round	Hartlepool United	0–1	Kettering Town	Hartlepool
15:00		Report	Ashikodi 15'	Stadium: Victoria Park; Attendance: 2,645; Referee: Mark Haywood

=== League Cup ===
12 August 2009 First round	Coventry City	0–1	Hartlepool United	Coventry
19:45		Report	Boyd 105'	Stadium: Ricoh Arena; Attendance: 1,892; Referee: Mark Haywood

25 August 2009 Second round	Hartlepool United	1–2 (a.e.t.)	Burnley	Hartlepool
19:45	Boyd 39'	Report	Fletcher 84', 108'	Stadium: Victoria Park; Attendance: 3,501; Referee: Jonathan Moss

=== Football League Trophy ===
6 October 2009 First round	Hartlepool United	0–2	Grimsby Town	Hartlepool
19:00		Report	Sweeney 6'; Proudlock 34'	Stadium: Victoria Park; Attendance: 1,675; Referee: Nigel Miller

== Squad statistics ==
=== Appearances and goals ===
No.	Pos	Nat	Player	Total		League One		FA Cup		League Cup		Other	
No.	Pos	Nat	Player	Apps	Goals	Apps	Goals	Apps	Goals	Apps	Goals	Apps	Goals
1	GK	(England) ENG	Scott Flinders	50	0	46	0	1	0	2	0	1	0
2	DF	(England) ENG	Neil Austin	41	3	39	3	1	0	0	0	1	0
3	MF	(England) ENG	Ritchie Humphreys	40	0	38	0	1	0	0	0	1	0
4	DF	(England) ENG	Gary Liddle	45	3	41	3	1	0	2	0	1	0
5	DF	(England) ENG	Sam Collins	48	0	44	0	1	0	2	0	1	0
6	DF	(England) ENG	Ben Clark	10	0	10	0	0	0	0	0	0	0
7	MF	(Republic of Ireland) IRL	Leon McSweeney	34	1	31	1	0	0	2	0	1	0
8	MF	(England) ENG	Ritchie Jones	36	4	33	4	1	0	2	0	0	0
9	FW	(Republic of Ireland) IRL	Denis Behan	33	6	29	6	1	0	2	0	1	0
10	FW	(England) ENG	Adam Boyd	44	9	40	7	1	0	2	2	1	0
11	MF	(England) ENG	Andy Monkhouse	47	11	43	11	1	0	2	0	1	0
12	FW	(England) ENG	James Brown	33	4	32	4	0	0	1	0	0	0
14	MF	(England) ENG	Jonny Rowell	7	0	6	0	0	0	0	0	1	0
15	MF	(England) ENG	Antony Sweeney	45	2	42	2	1	0	2	0	0	0
16	DF	(England) ENG	Steven Haslam	18	0	15	0	0	0	2	0	1	0
17	FW	(England) ENG	David Foley	2	0	2	0	0	0	0	0	0	0
18	FW	(England) ENG	Michael Mackay	1	0	1	0	0	0	0	0	0	0
19	MF	(Norway) NOR	Jon André Fredriksen	14	0	12	0	2	0	0	0	0	0
20	MF	(Republic of Ireland) IRL	Alan Power	2	0	2	0	0	0	0	0	0	0
23	FW	(Republic of Ireland) IRL	Colin Larkin	26	1	22	1	1	0	2	0	1	0
24	FW	(England) ENG	Billy Greulich	5	0	4	0	1	0	0	0	0	0
26	FW	(Iceland) ISL	Ármann Björnsson	19	3	18	3	0	0	0	0	1	0
27	DF	(France) FRA	Julian Cherel	1	0	1	0	0	0	0	0	0	0
29	DF	(England) ENG	Peter Hartley	41	2	38	2	1	0	2	0	0	0
30	MF	(Republic of Ireland) IRL	Joe Gamble	22	2	22	2	0	0	0	0	0	0
32	FW	(Republic of Ireland) IRL	Roy O'Donovan	15	9	15	9	0	0	0	0	0	0

=== Goalscorers ===
Rank	Name	League One	FA Cup	League Cup	Other	Total
1	Andy Monkhouse	11	0	0	0	11
2	Adam Boyd	7	0	2	0	9
2	Roy O'Donovan	9	0	0	0	9
3	Denis Behan	6	0	0	0	6
4	James Brown	4	0	0	0	4
4	Ritchie Jones	4	0	0	0	4
5	Neil Austin	3	0	0	0	3
5	Ármann Björnsson	3	0	0	0	3
5	Gary Liddle	3	0	0	0	3
6	Joe Gamble	2	0	0	0	2
6	Peter Hartley	2	0	0	0	2
6	Antony Sweeney	2	0	0	0	2
7	Colin Larkin	1	0	0	0	1
7	Leon McSweeney	1	0	0	0	1

=== Suspensions ===
Date Incurred	Name	Games Missed	Reason
24 November 2009	Ritchie Jones	1	(yellow card) (yellow card) (red card) (vs. Southampton)
12 December 2009	Ben Clark	1	(yellow card) (yellow card) (red card) (vs. Southend United)
2 January 2010	Peter Hartley	3	(red card) (vs. Oldham Athletic)
20 February 2010	Andy Monkhouse	1	Booked
