= Jonathan Rowell =

Jonathan Rowell may refer to:

- Jonathan H. Rowell (1833-1908), former U.S. Representative
- Jonny Rowell, Jonathan 'Jonny' Rowell (born 1989), English footballer
