= Peter Hartley (footballer) =

English footballer

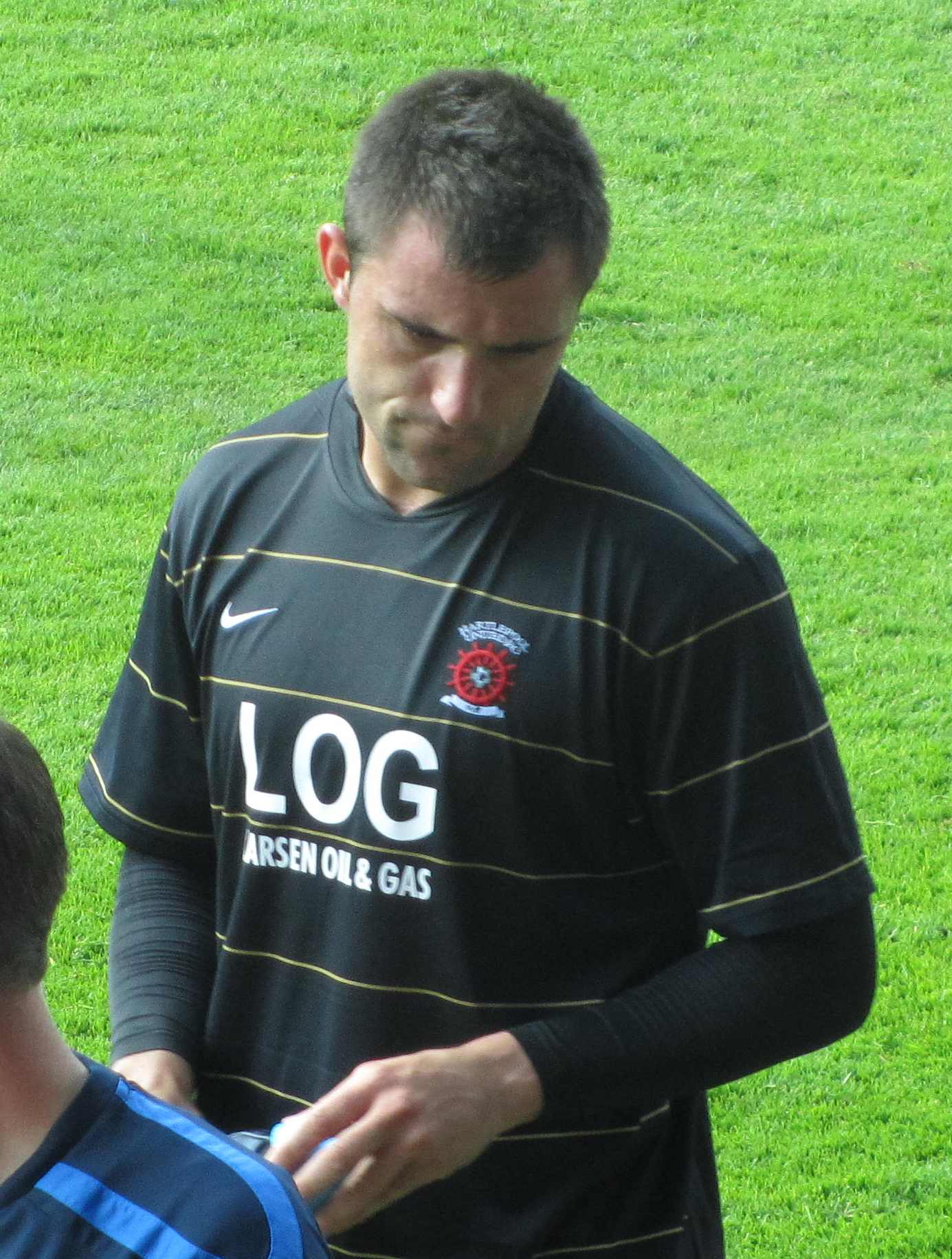
- Hartley with Hartlepool United in 2011

Personal information
- Full name: Peter William Hartley
- Date of birth: 3 April 1988 (age 38)
- Place of birth: Hartlepool, England
- Height: 1.84 m (6 ft 0 in)
- Position: Centre-back

Team information
- Current team: Spennymoor Town (manager)

Youth career
- 2000–2006: Sunderland

Senior career*
Years	Team	Apps	(Gls)
2006–2009	Sunderland	1	(0)
2008	→ Chesterfield (loan)	17	(1)
2009–2013	Hartlepool United	166	(10)
2013–2014	Stevenage	31	(2)
2014–2016	Plymouth Argyle	81	(6)
2016–2017	Bristol Rovers	18	(5)
2017–2018	Blackpool	0	(0)
2017–2018	→ Motherwell (loan)	14	(2)
2018–2020	Motherwell	39	(2)
2020–2023	Jamshedpur	47	(6)
2023	Hartlepool United	7	(0)
2023–2024	Inter Kashi	16	(1)
Total		437	(35)

Managerial career
- 2024–2026: St. Mirren FC B (assistant coach)
- 2026: Kerala Blasters (assistant coach)
- 2026–: Spennymoor Town
- * Club domestic league appearances and goals

Peter William Hartley (born 3 April 1988) is an English professional football manager and former player who is currently the first team manager of National League North club Spennymoor Town.

Hartley began his career at Sunderland, during which time he had a spell on loan at Chesterfield. He then went on to play for Hartlepool United, Stevenage, Plymouth Argyle, Bristol Rovers and Blackpool and in August 2017, he signed for Motherwell, initially on loan, making the move permanent in January 2018. In 2020, Hartley joined Indian Super League side Jamshedpur before returning to Hartlepool United for his second spell with the club in 2023. He ended his career in India with Inter Kashi.

== Career ==
=== Early career ===
Hartley began his career at Sunderland in 2000, joining the club on a youth contract. He progressed through the youth ranks at Sunderland, and signed his first professional contract in 2006, starting with a one-year. Hartley later revealed that he was released at first, but then had his contract renewed. Hartley made his debut for the Sunderland first-team on 1 January 2007, coming on as an 84th-minute substitute in a 2–0 away win against Leicester City. It proved to be Hartley's only first-team appearance for the club, although he featured regularly for Sunderland's second-string over the next two seasons. At the 2006–07 season, Hartley was among youngsters to be retained ahead of a new season. Midway through the 2007–08 season, in February 2008, Hartley was loaned out to League Two side Chesterfield on an initial one-month loan. He made his debut for Chesterfield a day after signing, on 23 February, playing the whole match as the club secured a 1–0 victory over Brentford. Hartley impressed during his month with the club, and the loan deal was extended for the remainder of the campaign, with the defender making twelve appearances before returning to his parent club in May 2008. He left Sunderland at the end of the 2008–09 campaign, rejecting the option to stay a further year.

=== Hartlepool United ===
Hartley signed for his hometown club Hartlepool United in May 2009.

He made his debut in the opening game of the season in a 1–1 draw against Milton Keynes Dons He scored his first goal of the season, in a 1–0 win over Tranmere Rovers on 24 October 2009. Six weeks later, on 4 December 2009, Hartley scored his second goal of the season, in a 3–0 win over Millwal. After the match, Hartley told BBC Tees that he was delighted to score in the match and glad to extend his goal tally. In a 2–1 win over Oldham Athletic on 2 January 2010, Hartley was then sent-off in the 83rd minute after he attempted to headbutt Sean Gregan in an off the ball incident. After serving a three match ban, Hartley made his return for the club on 26 January 2010, in a 1–1 draw against Gillingham. Hartley would make forty-one appearances in all competitions, scoring three times.

At the start of his Hartlepool career, Hartley started playing for Pools at left-back under Chris Turner before moving back to his natural role as a centre-half in the 2010–11 season forming a solid partnership with Sam Collins. First-team coach Mick Wadsworth praised Hartley for his progress and stated that he was developing into a "top, top centre-half". Hartley spent the start of the season on the bench for six matches out of ten and then scored his first goal of the season, in a 2–0 win over Peterborough United on 9 October 2010. His performances attracted the interest of clubs from the Football League Championship. Then, on 1 January 2011, Hartley scored again with a volley, in a 4–2 win over Oldham Athletic. At the end of the season, Hartley remained in talks with the club over a new contract and later confirmed the signing of a new contract on 18 May 2011. Hartley would make forty-four appearances in all competitions in his second season.

In the 2011–12 season, Hartley continued his partnership with Collins at the start of the season. He scored his first goal of the 2011–12 season, on 19 August 2011, in a 2–2 draw against Stevenage. In a 1–1 draw against Leyton Orient, Hartley was the victim of mistaken identity after he was booked by the referee, when in fact Evan Horwood had committed the foul. The club would win the appeal, which manager Wadsworth was relief over this. He scored again, on 30 December 2011, in a 3–1 loss against Sheffield United and another three weeks later, on 20 January 2012, in a 2–2 draw against Sheffield Wednesday. In the last game of the season, Hartley scored his fourth goal of the season, in a 3–2 loss against Charlton Athletic. Hartley would make forty-seven appearances in all competitions, scoring four times. Though he lost out for the club's supporters' Player of the Year award, Hartley would win Players' Player of the Year.

At the start of the 2012–13 season, Hartley was named Hartlepool captain in October 2012 by boss Neale Cooper. Hartley then scored his first goal of the season, in a 2–1 win over Notts County on 2 February 2013, which he and James Poole were described as "Hartley-Poole double-act" and two weeks later, on 16 February 2013, he scored again, in a 2–1 win over Leyton Orient. As a result of recent good displays, Hartley was nominated for the nPower League One Player of the Month Award for February 2013, having scored twice with Pools only conceding four times in the month and picking up 14 points from a possible 18, this also saw Hartlepool boss John Hughes nominated for the Manager of the Month Award. Both Hartley and Hughes were successful in winning their respective awards. Under Hartley's leadership, Hartley was unable to help the club survive relegation, as they finished in twenty-third place and made forty-six appearances in all competitions and scored two goals.

After this, Hartley said about the club's relegation, quoting: "Some people might want to say 'it's gone, forget about it' – but we can use relegation as a motivation. I think you can look back to it and remember how we felt when we were relegated. It was horrible and something I don't want to experience ever again. You can use that to make sure it doesn't happen again. It can give you that fire in your belly. That's what we have to do, not just bury it and never talk about it." Ahead of the 2013–14 season, Hartley remained wearing number the twenty-nine shirt until his departure to Stevenage.

=== Stevenage ===
In August 2013, Hartley signed for League One side Stevenage for an "undisclosed five-figure sum". On joining Stevenage and leaving his hometown club after four years, Hartley stated – "I'm really looking forward to it. It's a great challenge. I have played against Graham's teams in the past and they are always strong and tough to play against. Sometimes you have to think about what you want out of your career. I'm a hungry and ambitious person. This is a new challenge – it's a new set of lads, a new manager, a new town and new ambitions, it's what I need. I think I need this new start to improve again and I'm excited by it".

Hartley made his Stevenage debut on 17 August, playing the whole match in a 1–0 home defeat to Leyton Orient. After making eleven appearances for the club so far, Hartley scored his first goal, "nodding home" for Stevenage to take the lead, in a 2–0 win over Crawley Town on 26 October 2013. After picking up his fifth yellow card of the season, against Gillingham, Hartley was banned for one match. After returning from suspension, he made an appearance in the second round of the FA Cup against Stourbridge before suffering a knock that kept him out for weeks. Then in the third round of the FA Cup, Hartley scored his second goal for the club when he headed in to make 2–0, in a 3–2 win over Doncaster Rovers on 4 January 2014. He then scored his third goal for the club when he levelled from Luke Freeman's free kick. Once again, Hartley was unable to help the club survive relegation after finishing in twenty-fourth place. Hartley had his position rotated during the season, from defender to midfielder. At the end of the 2013–14 season, it was announced that Hartley was among six players to be released.

=== Plymouth Argyle ===
In June 2014, Hartley agreed to sign for League Two side Plymouth Argyle as of 1 July after his release from Stevenage. On joining Plymouth Argyle, Hartley quoted on the move,"I spoke to the manager a couple of weeks ago now and I was taken in by his desire to want to go places with this club. When he said he wanted me to jump on board, I couldn't wait. I understand the manager loves his football and is very passionate, so it'll suit me right down to the ground." Hartley was also given the number 29 shirt, just like he wore at Hartlepool United and Stevenage.

Hartley made his Plymouth Argyle debut on 17 August, playing the whole match in a 1–0 home away to Cambridge United, where he was in a central-defence partnership with Curtis Nelson. It took until 13 September 2014 for Hartley scored his first Plymouth Argyle goal, in a 2–1 loss against Morecambe. A month later on 25 October 2014, his second goal came in a 3–0 win over Cheltenham Town. Then in the first round of FA Cup, Hartley scored in a 3–0 win over AFC Fylde and then his third goal of the season came on 13 December 2014, in a 3–2 win over Northampton Town. Ahead of the match against Dagenham & Redbridge, Hartley was expected to be captain in Nelson's absence, however, he was dropped from the first team after suffering a hip problem during the warm up. Hartley made his return in the first team against York City, but only played for 45 minutes, suffering a hip problem for the second time. Following his return against Hartlepool United on 31 January 2015, Hartley scored his fourth goal of the season, in a 2–0 win over Wycombe Wanderers on 10 February 2015. In his first season at Plymouth Argyle, he made forty-six appearances and scored five times in all competitions, Hartley signed a new contract with the club despite interest from Scottish Premiership side Ross County.

In his second season at Plymouth Argyle, Hartley changed number shirt from 29 to 6.

=== Bristol Rovers ===
In 2016, Hartley signed for Bristol Rovers. Hartley made his debut for the club in a 3–1 defeat to Scunthorpe United and scored his first goal for the club in a 1–1 draw with Southend United. In an EFL Cup second round tie, Hartley scored in a 3–2 defeat to Chelsea at Stamford Bridge. Hartley scored his second goal for the club with his club's second goal in a dramatic 3–2 win over Northampton Town with a header from a Charlie Colkett corner. On 2 January 2017, Hartley suffered a foot injury in a 4–1 defeat to Charlton Athletic and despite playing the match, was ruled out for 3 months.

=== Blackpool ===
In June 2017, Hartley signed for Blackpool on a two-year contract.

On 31 August 2017, Hartley moved on loan to Scottish Premiership club Motherwell until the end of the season.

=== Motherwell ===
On 23 January 2018, Hartley turned his loan at Motherwell into a permanent deal signing a contract until 2020. On announcing the signing, the club released a video parodying the unveiling of Alexis Sánchez by Manchester United earlier in the month, where Hartley plays a miniature piano and is presented with the hashtag "#Pete6".

Ahead of the 2018–19 season, Hartley was named captain of Motherwell, replacing Carl McHugh who chose to step down from the position.

On 31 May 2020, Hartley was one of a number of first team players released at the end of their contract.

=== Jamshedpur ===
On 20 August 2020 he was signed by Indian Super League side Jamshedpur FC on a two-year deal. He made his debut on the opening day of the season as his new side were defeated 2–1 at home by Chennaiyin FC. A first goal for the club came when Hartley scored a consolation in a 2–1 home defeat to NorthEast United. After a club-record nine clean sheets in a season where Hartley was appointed club captain, he signed a new one-year contract with the club. Jamshedpur tasted success in the 2021–22 season, a league record seventh consecutive victory clinching Hartley's side the League Winners' Shield.

On 30 December 2022, Jamshedpur announced that Hartley had mutually parted ways with the club.

=== Hartlepool United ===
On 9 January 2023, Hartley returned to Hartlepool United on a deal until the end of the season. On 21 January 2023, Hartley made his first appearance for Hartlepool in nearly ten years in a 2–0 victory against Rochdale. He left the club at the end of the 2022–23 season following the expiration of his contract.

=== Inter Kashi ===
In August 2023, Hartley moved back to India when he signed for newly formed I-League side Inter Kashi. In doing so, he became the club's first ever signing.

His retirement from football was announced in August 2024.

== Coaching career ==
Hartley holds a UEFA A coaching licence. In July 2024, Hartley alongside Matthew Dolan formed their own company which runs football coaching summer camps.

Upon retiring from football in August 2024, he took up a coaching position in the academy at Middlesbrough. On 2 October 2024, Scottish Premiership side St Mirren announced that Hartley had joined the club as Head of First Team Transition and Loan Pathways.

On 10 April 2026, Hartley was assigned as the assistant coach of Kerala Blasters.

On 29 September 2026, Hartley was appointed manager of National League North club Spennymoor Town.

== Career statistics ==
=== Club ===
Appearances and goals by club, season and competition
Club	Season	League			National Cup		League Cup		Other		Total	
Club	Season	Division	Apps	Goals	Apps	Goals	Apps	Goals	Apps	Goals	Apps	Goals
Sunderland	2006–07	Championship	1	0	0	0	0	0	0	0	1	0
Sunderland	2007–08	Premier League	0	0	0	0	0	0	0	0	0	0
Sunderland	2008–09	Premier League	0	0	0	0	0	0	0	0	0	0
Sunderland	Total		1	0	0	0	0	0	0	0	1	0
Chesterfield (loan)	2007–08	League Two	12	0	0	0	0	0	0	0	12	0
Hartlepool United	2009–10	League One	38	2	1	0	2	0	0	0	41	2
Hartlepool United	2010–11	League One	40	2	4	0	0	0	2 (Note: Appearances in the Football League Trophy)	0	46	2
Hartlepool United	2011–12	League One	44	4	1	0	1	0	1	0	47	4
Hartlepool United	2012–13	League One	43	2	1	0	1	0	1	0	46	2
Hartlepool United	2013–14	League Two	1	0	0	0	0	0	0	0	1	0
Hartlepool United	Total		166	10	7	0	4	0	4	0	181	10
Stevenage	2013–14	League One	31	2	3	1	1	0	3	0	38	3
Plymouth Argyle	2014–15	League Two	39	4	2	1	1	0	4 (Note: Two appearances in the Football League Trophy and two in the League Two play-offs)	0	46	5
Plymouth Argyle	2015–16	League Two	42	2	1	0	1	0	6 (Note: Three appearances in the Football League Trophy and three in the League Two play-offs)	1	50	3
Plymouth Argyle	Total		81	6	3	1	2	0	10	1	96	7
Bristol Rovers	2016–17	League One	18	5	3	0	2	1	2 (Note: Appearances in the EFL Trophy)	0	25	6
Blackpool	2017–18	League One	0	0	0	0	1	0	1	0	2	0
Motherwell (loan)	2017–18	Scottish Premiership	14	2	0	0	3	1	0	0	17	3
Motherwell	2017–18	Scottish Premiership	0	0	0	0	0	0	0	0	0	0
Motherwell	2018–19	Scottish Premiership	14	1	1	0	3	1	0	0	18	2
Motherwell	2019–20	Scottish Premiership	25	1	3	0	2	1	0	0	30	2
Motherwell	Total		39	2	4	0	5	2	0	0	48	4
Jamshedpur	2020–21	Indian Super League	19	2	–		–		–		19	2
Jamshedpur	2021–22	Indian Super League	20	3	–		–		–		20	3
Jamshedpur	2022–23	Indian Super League	8	1	–		–		–		8	1
Jamshedpur	Total		47	6	0	0	0	0	0	0	47	4
Hartlepool United	2022–23	League Two	7	0	0	0	0	0	0	0	7	0
Inter Kashi	2023–24	I-League	16	1	–		–		–		16	1
Career total			412	33	20	2	18	4	20	1	461	39

== Managerial statistics ==
As of 21 November 2026

Managerial record by team and tenure
Team	From	To	Record					Ref
Team	From	To	G	W	D	L	Win %	Ref
Spennymoor Town	29 September 2026	Present	10	2	2	6	20.00	
Total			10	2	2	6	20.00	—

== Honours ==
Motherwell

- Scottish Cup runner-up: 2017–18
- Scottish League Cup runner-up: 2017–18

Jamshedpur

- Indian Super League Premiership: 2021–22

Individual

- League One Player of the Month: February 2013
