= Scott Flinders =

English footballer (born 1986)

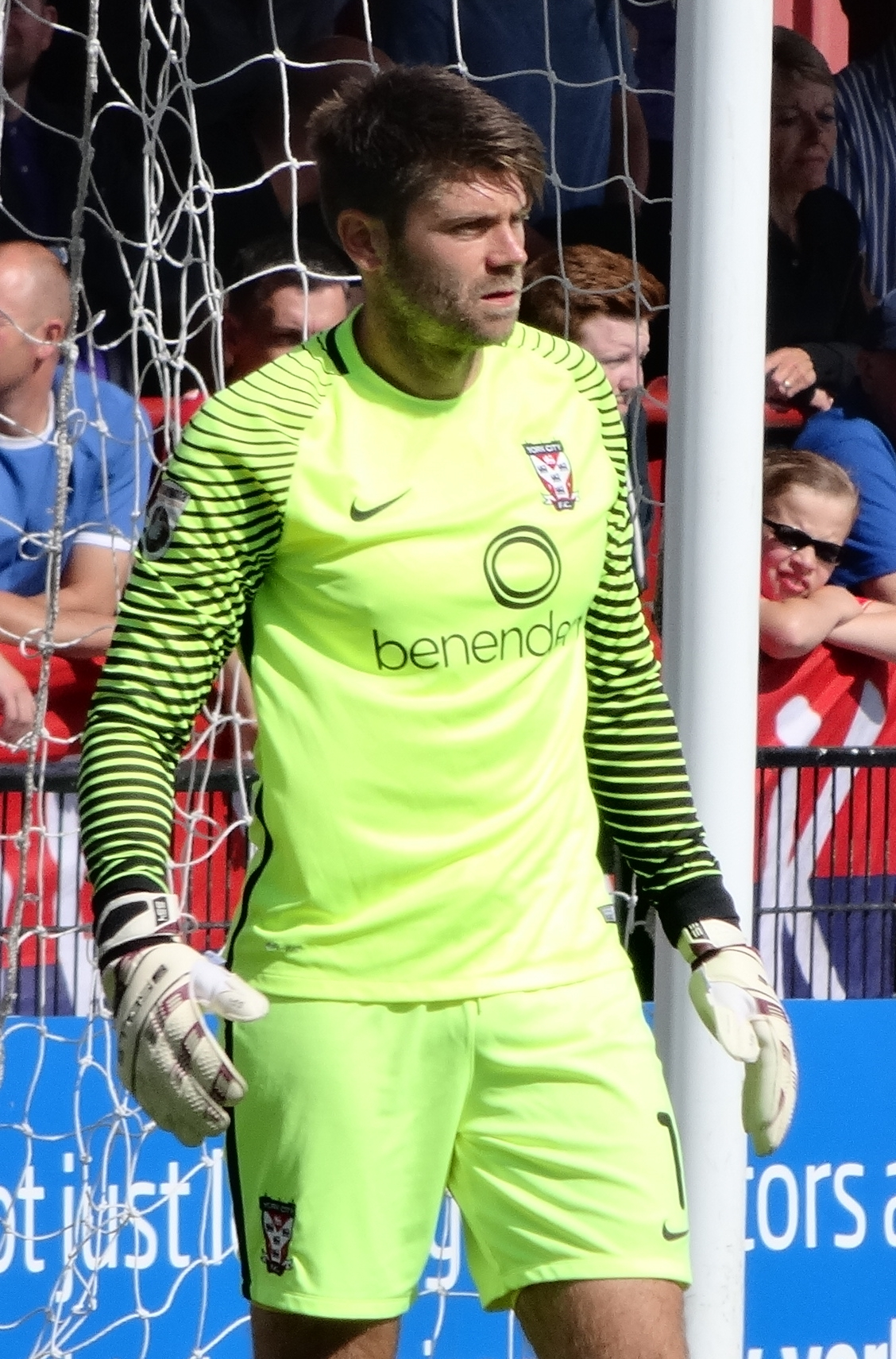
- Flinders playing for York City in 2016

Personal information
- Full name: Scott Liam Flinders
- Date of birth: 12 June 1986 (age 40)
- Place of birth: Rotherham, England
- Height: 6 ft 4 in (1.93 m)
- Position: Goalkeeper

Team information
- Current team: Barnsley (goalkeeper coach)

Youth career
- –2003: Barnsley

Senior career*
Years	Team	Apps	(Gls)
2003–2006	Barnsley	14	(0)
2006–2009	Crystal Palace	8	(0)
2006	→ Gillingham (loan)	9	(0)
2007	→ Brighton & Hove Albion (loan)	12	(0)
2008	→ Yeovil Town (loan)	9	(0)
2008	→ Blackpool (loan)	0	(0)
2008–2009	→ Falkirk (loan)	8	(0)
2009–2015	Hartlepool United	252	(1)
2015–2017	York City	52	(0)
2016	→ Macclesfield Town (loan)	5	(0)
2017	Macclesfield Town	18	(0)
2017–2022	Cheltenham Town	133	(0)
2022–2025	Mansfield Town	12	(0)
Total		532	(1)

International career
2005	England U20	5	(0)
- * Club domestic league appearances and goals as of 00:22, 6 May 2025 (UTC)

Scott Liam Flinders (born 12 June 1986) is an English former professional footballer who is the goalkeeper coach for EFL League One club Barnsley.

Flinders has played for Barnsley, Crystal Palace, Gillingham, Brighton & Hove Albion, Yeovil Town, Blackpool, Falkirk, Hartlepool United, York City, Macclesfield Town and Cheltenham Town. He has also played for the England national under-20 team.

== Club career ==
=== Barnsley ===
Born in Rotherham, South Yorkshire, Flinders started out at Barnsley, making his first-team debut in 2005, when he replaced the injured Ross Turnbull in the Barnsley goal. He made an instant impression, and played eleven matches in the next three months.

In the 2005–06 season, he was picked to play for a "Football League XI", in a match against their Italian counterparts. He went back to being second choice at Barnsley, this time to Nick Colgan and was an unused substitute in Barnsley's play-off final win against Swansea City. Because of this, he only made a few more league and cup appearances in which he again impressed, leading to trials at Chelsea and Wigan Athletic. Flinders moved to Crystal Palace as part of a deal that took Sam Togwell to Barnsley in the summer of 2006.

=== Crystal Palace ===
Flinders' transfer fee from Barnsley to Palace was believed to be for £250,000 but with a potential to rise to £1 million depending on appearances.

Flinders made his competitive debut for Palace in a League Cup tie with Notts County, playing the full match as Palace were beaten 2–1. This would be his last appearance before going on loan to League One club Gillingham, where he made his debut in a 2–1 away win against Doncaster Rovers on 9 September 2006. His loan with Gillingham was extended for a second month, but this extended loan did not last its full spell. He returned to the Crystal Palace bench by 28 October.

For the next match, a trip to Sheffield Wednesday, Flinders made his league debut with The Eagles, while Gábor Király was dropped to the bench for a match which ended in a 3–2 defeat. This was quickly followed by a match at Loftus Road, against Queens Park Rangers, which ended in a 4–2 loss, after which he was dropped, not returning until late December.

On 20 February 2007, Flinders was sent out on loan again. He signed for Palace's rivals, Brighton & Hove Albion, after their first choice goalkeeper Michel Kuipers was injured. He made his Seagulls debut at his previous club Gillingham, a match which his new team won 1–0.

Flinders was sent out on loan again in February 2008, this time to Yeovil Town, after their first choice goalkeeper Steve Mildenhall was injured. However, despite Yeovil signing him for further month loan period, on 27 March, Championship club Blackpool signed him on loan until the end of the season as competition for first-choice keeper, Paul Rachubka. With Blackpool's next match being an away match at Crystal Palace he was not allowed to make his debut for the club until after that match. However, his loan period finished without him making an appearance for Blackpool.

In August 2008, Flinders signed for Scottish Premier League club Falkirk on loan until January 2009, and he returned to Palace at the end of this spell. Flinders was released by Crystal Palace on 6 May 2009.

=== Hartlepool United ===
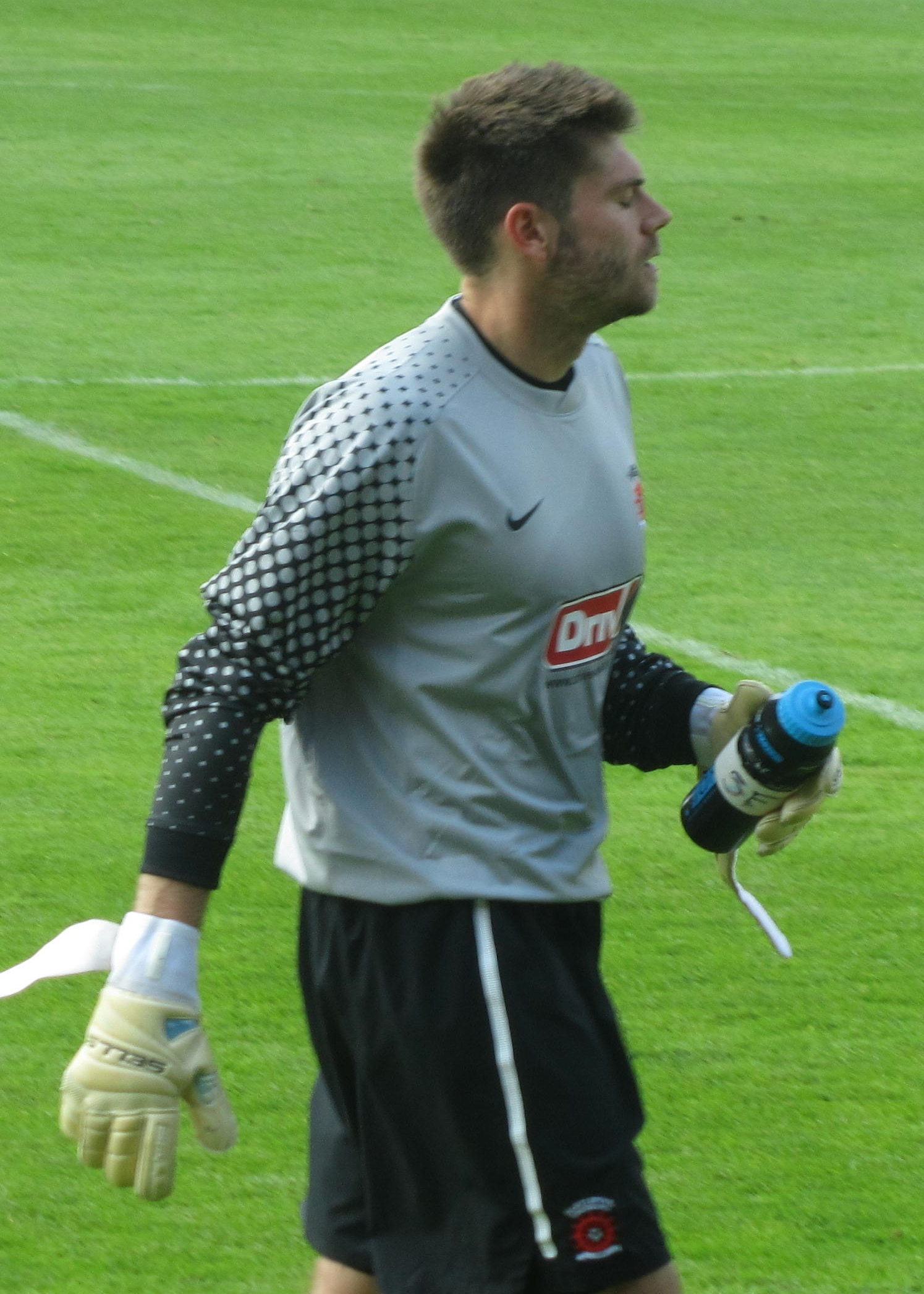
Flinders playing for Hartlepool United in 2011

On 26 June 2009, Flinders signed for League One club Hartlepool United. He played every minute of the 2009–10 season for Hartlepool in both league and cup, the next season he was limited to 26 league appearances due to an injury in mid-September which ruled him out until February which saw Pools boss Mick Wadsworth draft in Blackburn Rovers goalkeeper Jake Kean on loan to cover for Flinders.

Flinders became the first ever goalkeeper to score a goal from open play for Hartlepool when his 94th-minute header against AFC Bournemouth on 30 April 2011 gained a point for his employers on the last home match of the season. He nearly scored in consecutive home matches for the club when against Walsall on 13 August 2011, when his 5th minute clearance from 70 yards bounced over Saddlers' keeper Jimmy Walker only for striker Colin Nish to tap in on the line for Nish's first Hartlepool goal.

Flinders signed a new contract with the club in May 2011. Flinders was nominated for League One's Player of the Month for September 2011, along with Hartlepool manager Mick Wadsworth being nominated for Manager of the Month, after conceding only two goals in four matches which saw his team win all four matches. However, he was unsuccessful as Preston North End striker Neil Mellor won the accolade.

In January 2013, Hartlepool manager John Hughes revealed to the Hartlepool Mail that clubs in the higher divisions were looking to sign Flinders with Hughes saying "I know there are a lot of clubs looking at big Scotty. It's no surprise others are looking at him and we're just grateful and thankful that he's in goal for Hartlepool. The way he conducts himself in his training and preparation and his values are first class."

In April 2013, prior to Hartlepool's final home match of the season, Flinders was voted Player's Player, Supporter's Player and Away Player of the Year for the 2012–13 campaign. Twelve days later, it was announced that Flinders had won the Hartlepool Mail SportsMail Player of the Year Award.

After a 0–0 draw against Portsmouth in December 2013, Flinders broke a club record for the most clean sheets in the league for Hartlepool. Flinders became the first ever Hartlepool goalkeeper to make 200 Football League appearances for the club after a 4–0 win against Bristol Rovers in March 2014.

In the 2014–15 season, Flinders captained Hartlepool to their 'great escape' from relegation to the National League. Flinders played his last game for Hartlepool in a 3–3 draw against Carlisle United.

=== York City ===
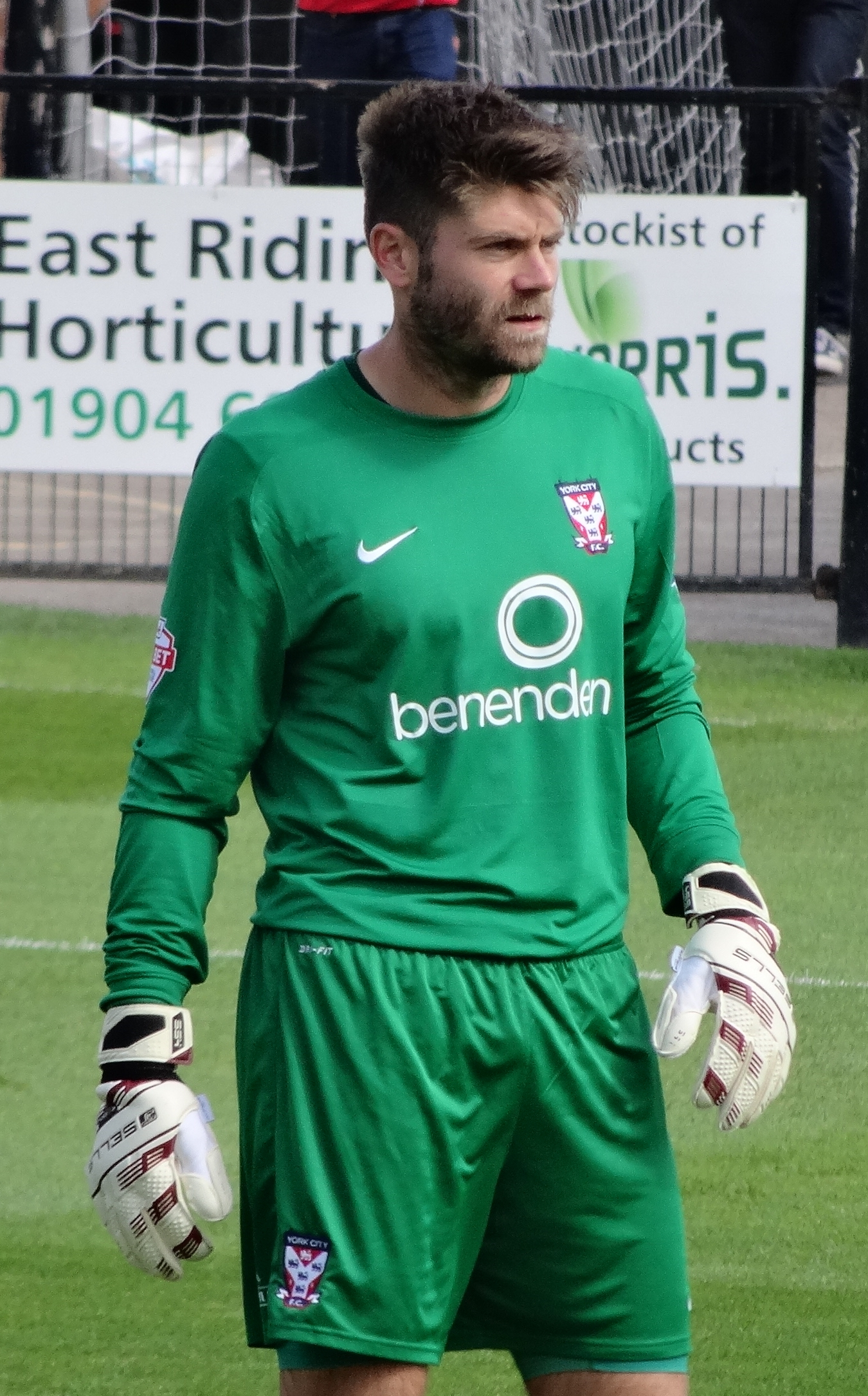
Flinders playing for York City in 2015

On 23 June 2015, Flinders signed for Hartlepool's League Two rivals York City on a one-year contract, with the option of a further year. He made his debut in the opening match of 2015–16, a 3–0 defeat away to Wycombe Wanderers on 8 August 2015. He made 48 appearances in 2015–16, as York were relegated into the National League with a 24th-place finish in League Two. York had the second-poorest defensive record with 87 goals conceded; however, Dave Flett of The Press defended Flinders, arguing that "without his saves, the club would have collected even fewer points". York exercised their option to extend his contract for 2016–17.

On 23 August 2016, Flinders was suspended for five matches by the Football Association (FA) after being found guilty of racial abuse during a match against AFC Wimbledon on 19 March 2016. He was also fined £1,250 and ordered to attend an education course. Flinders was swiftly suspended by York, being told to stay away from the club completely. In September 2016, the suspension was lifted by the club and Flinders returned to training, although he had lost his place in the team to new signing Kyle Letheren. Shortly after, Flinders was found guilty of racial abuse by the FA regulatory commission, having told AFC Wimbledon player Lyle Taylor that his wife "doesn't like your kind", after Taylor grabbed Flinders' testicles and goaded him.

On 20 September 2016, Flinders joined York's National League rivals Macclesfield Town on a 28-day loan until 18 October. He made his debut four days later when starting their 2–1 away win over Guiseley, finishing the loan with five appearances. Macclesfield wanted to extend his loan, but did not have the funds to do so. Flinders again lost his place in the York team in November 2016, and left the club by mutual consent on 5 January 2017.

=== Macclesfield Town ===
On 6 January 2017, Flinders signed for Macclesfield Town permanently on a contract until the end of the 2016–17 season. He helped Macclesfield Town reach the 2017 FA Trophy Final but ended up on the losing side, suffering a 3–2 loss against York City. He was released at the end of the season.

=== Cheltenham Town ===
Flinders signed for League Two club Cheltenham Town on 31 August 2017. After a few months he agreed a new contract with the club that would keep him at Cheltenham until the summer of 2019. In May 2019 he signed another new contract which extended his stay until the summer of 2021.

On 4 January 2020, he suffered a broken leg during a 3–0 home win over Oldham Athletic. After nine months on the sidelines, he returned to the team in an EFL Trophy group stage win over Plymouth Argyle in October 2020.

On 6 May 2022, Flinders was released by Cheltenham Town after not being offered a further contract.

=== Mansfield Town ===
On 6 June 2022, Flinders agreed to join League Two side Mansfield Town on an initial one-year deal upon the expiration of his contract with Cheltenham Town. On 28 January 2023, Flinders impressed on his League debut in a 4–1 win against Doncaster Rovers.

In May 2024, Flinders signed a new contract to keep him at the club for a further year.

On 19 June 2025, the club announced he had left after failing to reach a new deal.

== International career ==
Flinders made his debut for the England national under-20 team in a 3–0 win over South Korea on 6 June 2005. He finished his under-20 career with five caps, all earned in 2005.

== Coaching career ==
In June 2025, Flinders joined Barnsley as the club's first-team goalkeeper coach.

== Personal life ==
Flinders is married with one son and one daughter.

== Career statistics ==
Appearances and goals by club, season and competition
Club	Season	League			National cup (Note: Includes FA Cup)		League cup (Note: Includes League Cup, Scottish League Cup)		Other		Total	
Club	Season	Division	Apps	Goals	Apps	Goals	Apps	Goals	Apps	Goals	Apps	Goals
Barnsley	2003–04	Second Division	0	0	0	0	0	0	0	0	0	0
Barnsley	2004–05	League One	11	0	0	0	0	0	0	0	11	0
Barnsley	2005–06	League One	3	0	2	0	2	0	1 (Note: Appearance(s) in Football League Trophy)	0	8	0
Barnsley	Total		14	0	2	0	2	0	1	0	19	0
Crystal Palace	2006–07	Championship	8	0	2	0	1	0	—		11	0
Crystal Palace	2007–08	Championship	0	0	1	0	1	0	0	0	2	0
Crystal Palace	2008–09	Championship	0	0	0	0	0	0	—		0	0
Crystal Palace	Total		8	0	3	0	2	0	0	0	13	0
Gillingham (loan)	2006–07	League One	9	0	—		—		1	0	10	0
Brighton & Hove Albion (loan)	2006–07	League One	12	0	—		—		—		12	0
Yeovil Town (loan)	2007–08	League One	9	0	—		—		—		9	0
Blackpool (loan)	2007–08	Championship	0	0	—		—		—		0	0
Falkirk (loan)	2008–09	Scottish Premier League	8	0	—		1	0	—		9	0
Hartlepool United	2009–10	League One	46	0	1	0	2	0	1	0	50	0
Hartlepool United	2010–11	League One	26	1	0	0	2	0	1	0	29	1
Hartlepool United	2011–12	League One	45	0	1	0	1	0	1	0	48	0
Hartlepool United	2012–13	League One	46	0	1	0	1	0	1	0	49	0
Hartlepool United	2013–14	League Two	43	0	3	0	1	0	3	0	50	0
Hartlepool United	2014–15	League Two	46	0	2	0	1	0	1	0	50	0
Hartlepool United	Total		252	1	8	0	8	0	8	0	276	1
York City	2015–16	League Two	43	0	1	0	2	0	2	0	48	0
York City	2016–17	National League	9	0	—		—		0	0	9	0
York City	Total		52	0	1	0	2	0	2	0	57	0
Macclesfield Town	2016–17	National League	23	0	—		—		6 (Note: Appearances(s) in FA Trophy)	0	29	0
Cheltenham Town	2017–18	League Two	41	0	1	0	—		1 (Note: Appearance in EFL Trophy)	0	43	0
Cheltenham Town	2018–19	League Two	46	0	3	0	2	0	4	0	55	0
Cheltenham Town	2019–20	League Two	25	0	3	0	1	0	0	0	29	0
Cheltenham Town	2020–21	League Two	2	0	1	0	0	0	3	0	6	0
Cheltenham Town	2021–22	League One	19	0	3	0	1	0	0	0	23	0
Cheltenham Town	Total		133	0	11	0	4	0	8	0	156	0
Mansfield Town	2022–23	League Two	4	0	0	0	0	0	4	0	8	0
Mansfield Town	2023–24	League Two	0	0	0	0	0	0	3	0	3	0
Mansfield Town	2024–25	League One	8	0	0	0	0	0	3	0	11	0
Mansfield Town	Total		12	0	0	0	0	0	10	0	22	0
Career total			532	1	25	0	19	0	36	0	612	1

== Honours ==
Barnsley

- Football League One play-offs: 2006

Macclesfield Town

- FA Trophy runner-up: 2016–17

Mansfield Town

- EFL League Two third-place promotion: 2023–24

Individual

- Hartlepool United Player of the Year: 2012–13
