= Gary Liddle =

English footballer (born 1986)

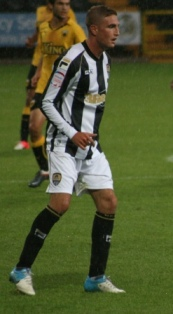
- Liddle playing for Notts County in 2012

Personal information
- Full name: Gary Daniel Liddle
- Date of birth: 15 June 1986 (age 40)
- Place of birth: Middlesbrough, England
- Height: 6 ft 1 in (1.85 m)
- Positions: Centre-back; midfielder

Team information
- Current team: Hartlepool United (First-team coach)

Youth career
- –2003: Middlesbrough

Senior career*
| Years | Team | Apps | (Gls) |
| 2003–2006 | Middlesbrough | 0 | (0) |
| 2006–2012 | Hartlepool United | 247 | (18) |
| 2012–2014 | Notts County | 78 | (4) |
| 2014–2016 | Bradford City | 61 | (3) |
| 2016–2017 | Chesterfield | 41 | (1) |
| 2017–2019 | Carlisle United | 101 | (2) |
| 2019–2020 | Walsall | 12 | (0) |
| 2019–2020 | → Hartlepool United (loan) | 15 | (0) |
| 2020–2022 | Hartlepool United | 55 | (0) |
| 2022–2024 | South Shields | 69 | (2) |
| 2024 | Spennymoor Town | 2 | (0) |
| 2024–2025 | Whitby Town | 25 | (0) |
| Total | | 707 | (30) |

Managerial career
- 2024–2026: Whitby Town
- 2026: Hartlepool United (joint-interim)
- * Club domestic league appearances and goals

Gary Daniel Liddle (born 15 June 1986) is an English former professional footballer and manager. He is First-team coach at National League club Hartlepool United. Liddle played as a midfielder and defender during his career.

He played in the English Football League for Hartlepool United, Notts County, Bradford City, Chesterfield, Carlisle United and Walsall.

Liddle came through the ranks at Middlesbrough where he won the FA Youth Cup in 2004. After leaving Middlesbrough, Liddle signed for local League Two side Hartlepool United where he would play an important role in Hartlepool's promotion to League One as runners-up. He would remain at the League One side for six seasons before departing for Notts County in 2012. Liddle won several individual awards in his first season with the Magpies and would stay with Notts County for two years before subsequently signing for Bradford City. At Bradford, Liddle was a member of the side that reached the quarter-finals of the FA Cup in 2014–15. He also later had spells at Chesterfield, Carlisle United and Walsall. He was sent on loan to former club Hartlepool United in 2019 who were now in the National League. He then signed permanently for the club where he would play an integral role in central defence as Hartlepool won the 2021 National League play-off final. He left at the end of Hartlepool's first season back in the Football League having made 364 appearances over three spells at the club, making him the tenth highest appearance maker in the club's history. Liddle then joined Northern Premier League side South Shields. In his first season, he was awarded as the club's Player of the Season as South Shields earned promotion to the National League North. In the following season, Liddle signed for Spennymoor Town.

He moved to Whitby Town as a player-coach where he would retire in 2024. He would become manager later that year before departing the club in 2026 to join Hartlepool United as a first-team coach.

== Career ==
=== Middlesbrough ===
Liddle was born in Middlesbrough, North Yorkshire. He began his career with hometown side Middlesbrough. He was a regular in the academy sides and won the 2003–04 FA Youth Cup. He signed a professional contract with Middlesbrough on 14 July 2003.

=== Hartlepool United ===
In August 2006, Liddle joined nearby League Two club Hartlepool United on a free transfer, signed by Danny Wilson. He made his debut in a League Cup win at Burnley on 22 August 2006 in central defence. He made a good impression during his first season with Hartlepool and performed well at right-back, centre-half and midfield. He shared the Players' Player of the Year award with Michael Nelson that year as Pools were promoted back to League One at the first attempt. He remained a mainstay in the side in the following seasons. In 2010, Liddle was booked in a game at Leyton Orient, which meant an instant suspension was triggered after collecting his 10th yellow card of the season. However, no-one at the club realised he had been cautioned and he played 48 hours later against Brighton & Hove Albion. Pools then recognised later he should have not appeared and informed the FA. Pools were charged with fielding an ineligible player and deducted three points. That meant with one game of the season to go, they were in a relegation battle, but a draw at Brentford on the final day of the season kept them up.

On 13 August 2011, while playing in a home league match against Walsall, Liddle suffered an injury, as his zygomatic bone became fractured in two places. He was able to complete the match, which ended in a 1–1 draw. However, he was sidelined afterwards. For his return to playing, he wore a protective mask.

On 19 May 2012, it was announced that Liddle was released from Hartlepool United after six years after he rejected a new deal. He made 238 appearances for the club during his first spell with the club.

=== Notts County ===
Liddle signed for League One club Notts County on 21 June 2012 on a two-year contract. Liddle stated that it was Keith Curle's desire to manage in the Championship that played a big part in the switch. "Keith wants to manage in the Championship with Notts. That's why I came here. Hopefully I can help him do that". Before the start of the 2012–13 season, Liddle admitted there was a challenge to earn a first team spot. "It's the most competitive squad I've ever been in, If I get the shirt I will have to play well to keep it and if I'm not in the team I'll have to work even harder in training to get in there."

He made his competitive debut for the club in a 2–1 victory over Crewe Alexandra, partnering Dean Leacock in the centre of defence. Liddle made a good start to his career at Notts County and was awarded the PFA Fans' Player of the Month for September, continuing to play at centre back, he ensured County remained unbeaten in that month.

Liddle made his final and 46th league appearance of the season against Coventry City. It meant he had played every minute of the 2012–13 season, equalling a record last set by County's Pedro Richards 30 years ago. He then won four awards at the clubs' end of season award ceremony. Including; The Manager's Player of the Year, Players' Player of the Year, Fans' Player of the Year and the Supporters' Club Player of the Year. He left Notts County in 2014, having made 78 league appearances over his two seasons with the club.

=== Bradford City ===
Liddle signed for Bradford City on 9 June 2014 on a one-year contract with the option of an additional year. He made his debut on 9 August 2016 in a 3–2 home win against Coventry City. In January 2015, he played for Bradford in their 4–2 away win at Premier League leaders Chelsea in the FA Cup fourth round. He also started for Bradford in the FA Cup quarter-finals, however they were eliminated by Championship club Reading in a replay. Liddle left Bradford in February 2016 having made 61 league appearances during his spell with the Bantams.

=== Chesterfield ===
Liddle signed for Chesterfield on 1 February 2016 for an undisclosed fee. He was named the club's captain. Liddle was sent off in his third appearance for the 'Spireites', on 16 February 2016 in an away game to Colchester United for an 18th minute foul. Liddle scored his first goal for the club on 13 August 2016, scoring the first in a 3–1 victory over Swindon Town, heading into an empty net after a Ched Evans free kick was saved.

=== Carlisle United ===
Liddle signed for League Two club Carlisle United on 13 January 2017 on a one-and-a-half-year contract for an undisclosed fee. He was released by Carlisle at the end of the 2018–19 season. He made 117 appearances in all competitions for the Cumbrians, scoring twice.

=== Walsall ===
On 26 July 2019, Liddle moved to Walsall, signed by his former Hartlepool teammate Darrell Clarke. He made 16 appearances for the Saddlers, before leaving on loan for his former club Hartlepool United, now playing in the National League where he played as a central defender.

=== Return to Hartlepool United ===
Liddle re-signed for Hartlepool permanently for a second time after a successful loan spell in the previous season from Walsall. Liddle's first appearance in his third spell at Hartlepool saw him reach the landmark of 300 appearances for Hartlepool United in a 2–1 win against Aldershot Town. Liddle played in the 2021 National League play-off final as Hartlepool defeated Torquay United on penalties to earn promotion back to the Football League. Following their promotion, Liddle signed a new one-year deal with the club. On 5 March 2022, Liddle made his 700th career appearance in a 2–1 win at Harrogate Town.

On 6 June 2022, it was announced that Liddle had decided to leave Hartlepool upon the expiration of his contract. During his three spells with Hartlepool United, Liddle made 364 appearances, making him the tenth highest appearance maker in the club's history.

=== South Shields ===
On the same day Liddle announced his departure from Hartlepool, he signed for South Shields. He played every minute for Shields during the 2022–23 season and won the club's Player of the Year award as the club won promotion to the National League North. Additionally, he was also named in the 2022–23 Northern Premier League Team of the Season.

In March 2023, it was announced that Liddle had left South Shields by mutual consent.

=== Spennymoor Town ===
Following his departure from South Shields, Liddle signed for fellow National League North side Spennymoor Town in March 2023 on a deal until the end of the season. In doing so, he linked up with his former Hartlepool manager Graeme Lee. Lee said of the signing "I worked with Gary at Hartlepool United and he's an outstanding competitor, a leader on and off the pitch and someone who can come in and help us during the final month. He's looked after himself exceptionally well and still has plenty to give so I am really pleased that we've been able to add him to the squad."

== Coaching career ==
=== Whitby Town ===
On 25 May 2024, it was announced Liddle had signed for Northern Premier League side Whitby Town. He signed a two-year deal with The Seasiders which saw him take up a player-coach role. In October 2024, Liddle was appointed manager at Whitby. On 9 February 2025, Liddle announced his retirement from playing. On 5 April 2025, Liddle came out of retirement in a game against Lancaster City. He led Whitby to a 16th-place finish.

=== Hartlepool United ===
On 2 July 2025, it was announced that he would also work as Lead Professional Development Phase Coach at Hartlepool United. On 8 February 2026, Liddle left Whitby Town to become first-team coach at Hartlepool United under Nicky Featherstone. As of February 2026, Liddle is completing his UEFA A Licence. Following the appointment of Lee Clark on 14 May 2026, Liddle was retained as first-team coach. Following Clark's resignation on 19 September 2026, Liddle took joint-interim charge of Hartlepool alongside Adam Clayton.

== Career statistics ==
Appearances and goals by club, season and competition
| Club | Season | League | | | FA Cup | | League Cup | | Other | | Total | |
| Club | Season | Division | Apps | Goals | Apps | Goals | Apps | Goals | Apps | Goals | Apps | Goals |
|---|---|---|---|---|---|---|---|---|---|---|---|---|
| Hartlepool United | 2006–07 | League Two | 42 | 3 | 2 | 0 | 2 | 0 | 1 (Note: Appearance(s) in Football League Trophy) | 1 | 47 | 4 |
| Hartlepool United | 2007–08 | League One | 41 | 2 | 2 | 1 | 2 | 0 | 2 | 0 | 47 | 3 |
| Hartlepool United | 2008–09 | League One | 43 | 0 | 5 | 1 | 3 | 0 | 1 | 0 | 52 | 1 |
| Hartlepool United | 2009–10 | League One | 41 | 3 | 1 | 0 | 2 | 0 | 1 | 0 | 45 | 3 |
| Hartlepool United | 2010–11 | League One | 42 | 6 | 4 | 0 | 2 | 0 | 3 | 0 | 51 | 6 |
| Hartlepool United | 2011–12 | League One | 39 | 4 | 1 | 0 | 1 | 0 | 1 | 0 | 42 | 4 |
| Hartlepool United | Total | | 248 | 18 | 15 | 2 | 12 | 0 | 9 | 1 | 284 | 21 |
| Notts County | 2012–13 | League One | 46 | 0 | 3 | 0 | 0 | 0 | 2 | 0 | 51 | 0 |
| Notts County | 2013–14 | League One | 32 | 4 | 1 | 0 | 1 | 0 | 3 | 0 | 37 | 4 |
| Notts County | Total | | 78 | 4 | 4 | 0 | 1 | 0 | 5 | 0 | 88 | 4 |
| Bradford City | 2014–15 | League One | 41 | 1 | 7 | 0 | 2 | 0 | 0 | 0 | 50 | 1 |
| Bradford City | 2015–16 | League One | 20 | 2 | 4 | 1 | 1 | 0 | 1 | 0 | 26 | 3 |
| Bradford City | Total | | 61 | 3 | 11 | 1 | 3 | 0 | 1 | 0 | 76 | 4 |
| Chesterfield | 2015–16 | League One | 15 | 0 | — | | — | | — | | 15 | 0 |
| Chesterfield | 2016–17 | League One | 26 | 1 | 2 | 0 | 1 | 0 | 2 (Note: Appearance(s) in EFL Trophy) | 0 | 31 | 1 |
| Chesterfield | Total | | 41 | 1 | 2 | 0 | 1 | 0 | 2 | 0 | 46 | 1 |
| Carlisle United | 2016–17 | League Two | 21 | 1 | — | | — | | 2 (Note: Appearances in League Two play-offs) | 0 | 23 | 1 |
| Carlisle United | 2017–18 | League Two | 41 | 0 | 5 | 0 | 2 | 0 | 1 | 0 | 49 | 0 |
| Carlisle United | 2018–19 | League Two | 39 | 1 | 2 | 0 | 1 | 0 | 3 | 0 | 45 | 1 |
| Carlisle United | Total | | 101 | 2 | 7 | 0 | 3 | 0 | 6 | 0 | 117 | 2 |
| Walsall | 2019–20 | League Two | 12 | 0 | 1 | 0 | 0 | 0 | 3 | 0 | 16 | 0 |
| Hartlepool United | 2019–20 | National League | 15 | 0 | 0 | 0 | 0 | 0 | 0 | 0 | 15 | 0 |
| Hartlepool United | 2020–21 | National League | 23 | 0 | 1 | 0 | 0 | 0 | 3 (Note: Appearances in National League play-offs) | 0 | 27 | 0 |
| Hartlepool United | 2021–22 | League Two | 32 | 0 | 5 | 0 | 1 | 0 | 0 | 0 | 38 | 0 |
| Hartlepool United | Total | | 70 | 0 | 6 | 0 | 1 | 0 | 3 | 0 | 80 | 0 |
| South Shields | 2022–23 | NPL Premier Division | 42 | 2 | 3 | 0 | 0 | 0 | 0 | 0 | 45 | 2 |
| South Shields | 2023–24 | National League North | 27 | 0 | 2 | 0 | 0 | 0 | 1 (Note: Appearance in FA Trophy) | 0 | 30 | 0 |
| South Shields | Total | | 69 | 2 | 5 | 0 | 0 | 0 | 1 | 0 | 75 | 2 |
| Spennymoor Town | 2023–24 | National League North | 2 | 0 | 0 | 0 | 0 | 0 | 0 | 0 | 2 | 0 |
| Whitby Town | 2024–25 | NPL Premier Division | 17 | 0 | 0 | 0 | 0 | 0 | 2 | 0 | 17 | 0 |
| Whitby Town | 2025–26 | NPL Premier Division | 8 | 0 | 1 | 0 | 0 | 0 | 1 | 0 | 10 | 0 |
| Whitby Town | Total | | 25 | 0 | 1 | 0 | 0 | 0 | 1 | 0 | 27 | 0 |
| Career total | | | 707 | 30 | 52 | 3 | 21 | 0 | 33 | 1 | 813 | 34 |

== Managerial statistics ==
As of 30 September 2026

Managerial record by team and tenure
| Team | From | To | Record | | | | | Ref. |
| Team | From | To | P | W | D | L | Win % | Ref. |
|---|---|---|---|---|---|---|---|---|
| Whitby Town | 8 October 2024 | 8 February 2026 | 60 | 21 | 13 | 26 | 35.0 | |
| Hartlepool United (joint-interim) | 21 September 2026 | Present | 2 | 0 | 0 | 2 | 0.0 | |
| Total | | | 62 | 21 | 13 | 28 | 33.9 | |

== Honours ==
Middlesbrough

- FA Youth Cup: 2003–04

Hartlepool United

- Football League Two second-place promotion: 2006–07
- National League play-offs: 2021

South Shields

- Northern Premier League: 2022–23

Individual

- Hartlepool United Players' Player of the Year (joint): 2006–07
- Notts County Player of the Year: 2012–13
- Notts County Manager's Player of the Year: 2012–13
- Notts County Players' Player of the Year: 2012–13
- Northern Premier League Team of the Year: 2022–23
- South Shields Player of the Year: 2022–23
