= Jon André Fredriksen =

Norwegian footballer (born 1982)

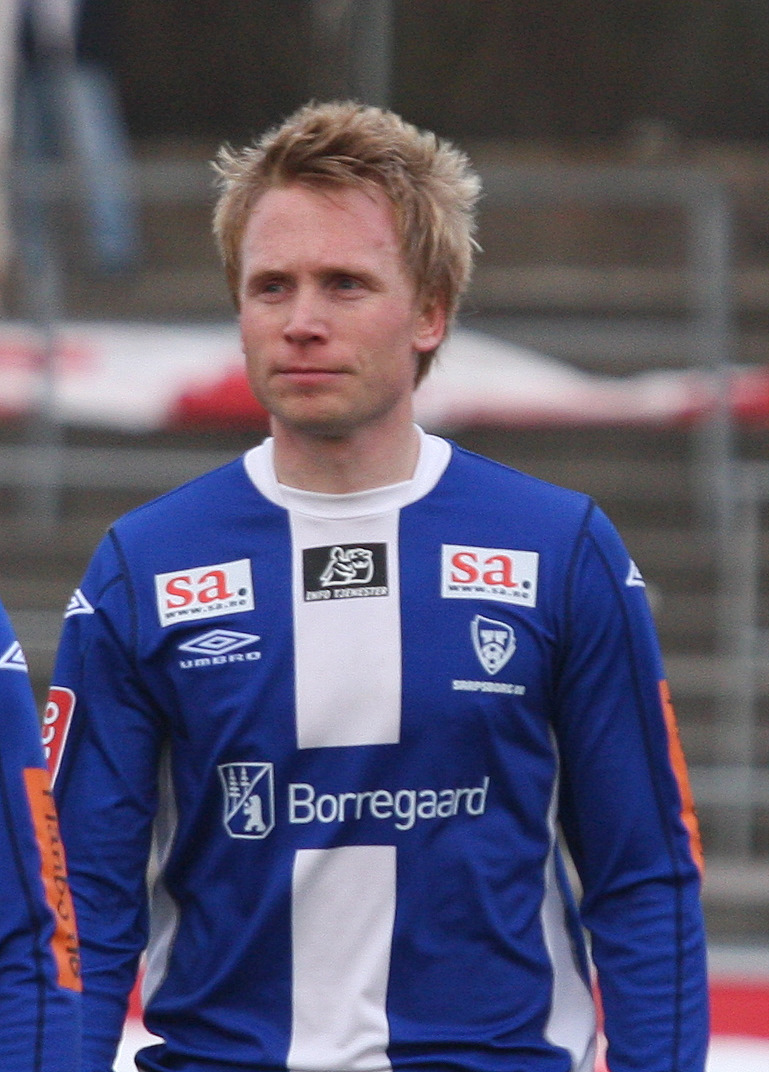
- Fredriksen in 2009

Personal information
- Full name: Jon André Fredriksen
- Date of birth: 5 April 1982 (age 44)
- Place of birth: Moss, Norway
- Height: 5 ft 9 in (1.75 m)
- Position: Midfielder

Team information
- Current team: Råde

Senior career*
Years	Team	Apps	(Gls)
1999–2001	Råde		
2002–2008	Moss	145	(26)
2009	Sarpsborg 08	13	(0)
2009–2010	Hartlepool United	13	(0)
2011–2014	Moss		
2015–	Råde		
- * Club domestic league appearances and goals as of 2 January 2010

Jon André Fredriksen (born 5 April 1982) is a retired Norwegian professional footballer who played as a midfielder.

== Career ==
Fredriksen started his career in his native Norway with Råde, before joining Moss and then Sarpsborg 08.

During a scouting trip to Norway, Fredriksen was spotted by Hartlepool United manager Chris Turner, signing him in July 2009. He made his debut for Hartlepool in a League One match on 8 August, away to Milton Keynes Dons in the 0–0 draw, before being substituted for Jonny Rowell in the 89th minute. He went on to make 12 league appearances in his first league season with the club. He left the club after having his contract cancelled by mutual consent on 20 October 2010.

On 18 October 2014 he retired from football after 11 seasons (2002–08 and 2011–14) with Moss. However, he returned to Råde in the Fifth Division.
