= Ármann Smári Björnsson =

Icelandic footballer

Ármann Björnsson
Personal information
- Full name: Ármann Smári Björnsson
- Date of birth: 7 January 1981 (age 45)
- Place of birth: Höfn, Iceland
- Height: 1.96 m (6 ft 5 in)
- Positions: Centre back; striker

Youth career
- Sindri

Senior career*
Years	Team	Apps	(Gls)
1999–2001	Sindri	61	(45)
2000	→ Lillestrøm (loan)	0	(0)
2001–2003	Valur	45	(7)
2002	→ Brann (loan)	7	(3)
2004–2006	FH	36	(7)
2006–2009	Brann	34	(4)
2009–2011	Hartlepool United	18	(3)
2012–2017	Íþróttabandalag Akraness	104	(5)
Total		305	(74)

International career
1999	Iceland U-19	2	(0)
2001–2003	Iceland U-21	7	(0)
2006–2009	Iceland	6	(1)
- * Club domestic league appearances and goals

Ármann Smári Björnsson (born 7 January 1981 in Höfn) is an Icelandic former footballer who last played for Íþróttabandalag Akraness.

== Club career ==
Born in Höfn, southeast Iceland, he started his club career at local outfit UMF Sindri in 1996, when he was 15 years old. In 1998, he was top scorer in the D-division with 32 goals. In 2001, he joined Valur and in 2002 he was loaned to SK Brann, and showed himself to be the club's most effective striker. But over-prizing from his club Valur, and the hiring of a new manager in Brann, spoiled a permanent transfer to Norway for Ármann. He returned to Iceland, where he won the Icelandic Premier League in three consecutive years with FH Hafnarfjarðar.

On 21 August 2006, SK Brann confirmed that Ármann was ready for his 2nd spell in the Norwegian club. He signed a 3-year contract with the Norwegian club after they agreed to pay an undisclosed fee to FH for his services. He was one match short of receiving the Premiership-silver medal.

In 2007, he won the Norwegian league with SK Brann, and scored 9 times in 26 league, cup and UEFA cup matches.

In August 2009 he was sold to Hartlepool United and made his debut coming on as sub in the 1–1 home draw against Wycombe Wanderers. He is infamously remembered by Hartlepool fans for when he missed from less than 2 yards in a 1–0 win over Huddersfield Town.

In May 2011 he was not offered a new contract by the club, along with nine other players from the 2010/11 squad.

He joined ÍA in 2012. After suffering a season-ending injury in 2016 he announced his retirement on 10 March 2017.

== International career ==
After a string of impressive displays in the 2006 season, Ármann earned his first international cap for Iceland when he came on as a substitute against Spain in a friendly in Reykjavík on 15 August 2006. His second cap was also against Spain as a substitute, this time in the qualifying for the Euro 2008 on 8 September 2007. In the third game he started against Northern Ireland and scored after six minutes, Iceland won 2–1.

== International goals ==
No.	Date	Venue	Opponent	Score	Result	Competition
1.	12 September 2007	Laugardalsvöllur, Reykjavík, Iceland	Northern Ireland	1–0	2–1	UEFA Euro 2008 qualifying

== Honours ==
=== Iceland ===
- Icelandic Premier League: 2004, 2005 and 2006
- Icelandic League Cup: 2004, 2006

=== Norway ===
- Norwegian Premier League: 2007
