= Leon McSweeney =

Irish footballer (born 1983)

Personal information
- Full name: Leon McSweeney
- Date of birth: 19 February 1983 (age 43)
- Place of birth: Cork, Ireland
- Positions: Defender; midfielder

Senior career*
Years	Team	Apps	(Gls)
2000–2001	Cork City	0	(0)
2001–2003	Leicester City	0	(0)
2003	Scarborough	4	(0)
2003–2004	Hucknall Town	23	(4)
2004–2005	Hednesford Town	43	(15)
2005	Hucknall Town	17	(3)
2006	Hednesford Town	19	(4)
2006–2007	Ilkeston Town	36	(12)
2007	Cork City	18	(5)
2008–2009	Stockport County	47	(5)
2009–2011	Hartlepool United	77	(3)
2011–2013	Leyton Orient	61	(0)
2013–2014	Carlisle United	8	(0)
2014	Northampton Town	18	(0)
2014	Nuneaton Town	4	(0)
Total		375	(51)
- * Club domestic league appearances and goals

Leon McSweeney (born 19 February 1983) is an Irish former footballer who made more than 200 appearances in the Football League. McSweeney now serves as the U21 Senior Development Phase Coach at former club Leicester City.

== Career ==
=== Early career ===
Leon McSweeney began his career with hometown club Cork City F.C. McSweeney's prolific form in Ireland whilst under the watchful eye of then manager Colin Murphy earned him a move Leicester City in 2001, signing a three-year professional contract whilst still a teenager.

=== Leicester City ===
Despite playing regularly for the Reserves, McSweeney failed to make a first-team appearance and in 2003 was released by manager Micky Adams. He soon signed a contract with Scarborough under the management of Russell Slade, where he made four appearances, before accepting a place at Loughborough University.

=== University and non-league ===
McSweeney enjoyed success representing the university football club, helping them win the British University Sports Association (BUSA) championship in 2005 and 2006. McSweeney was subsequently selected to represent the English University Football Team at the British University Games in 2007, helping the team win the gold medal.

In tandem with this, McSweeney tasted success at a number of non-league clubs starting at Hucknall Town, where he spent half a season, under manager Steve Burr, helping them win what was then the Northern Premier League title and achieve promotion to the Football Conference. The club declined their place in the higher league, however, and in the summer of 2004 McSweeney moved to Hednesford Town. He had a successful season with The Pitmen, scoring 15 goals and helping them gain promotion to the Conference North. He could not agree a new contract with the club, however, and so moved back to Hucknall Town in the summer of 2005, only to return to Hednesford Town again in December, but he could not prevent the club's relegation. The following summer McSweeney moved to Ilkeston Town under the guidance of former Nottingham Forest and Sheffield Wednesday striker Nigel Jemson. He spent one season there, scoring twelve goals. He graduated from Loughborough University in 2007 where he achieved a degree in geography with sport and leisure management.

=== Return to Cork City ===
McSweeney moved back to his hometown club, Cork City, in the League of Ireland in the summer of 2007, where he worked under well renowned Irish manager Damien Richardson. He made his debut in the League Cup Quarter-Final away to Bohemians. He was an instant success at Turners Cross, playing predominantly as a right winger and played a key role in the club's successful 2007 FAI Cup campaign culminating in a 1–0 victory over Longford Town FC. At the end of the Irish 2007 season McSweeney was voted Cork City's "signing of the season" by an online poll at corkcity.ie, but contract talks stalled due to the infamous "Arkaga" takeover and, despite interest from Bohemians, he crossed the Irish Sea again, signing an 18-month contract with Stockport County under the management of fellow Irishman Jim Gannon .

=== Stockport County ===
Success followed McSweeney to Edgeley Park, and at the end of the 2007–08 season he played his part in helping "The Hatters" gain promotion via the play-offs at the new Wembley Stadium, where they beat Rochdale 3–2 in front of almost 40,000 spectators. McSweeney continued his fine form in Stockport's League One campaign in 2008–09 with some eye catching performances in his new role as right back, and the Hatters style of football under Gannon allowed McSweeney become a crowd favourite, as he weighed in with five goals and eight assists in all competitions. He went on to make almost 50 appearances for the side before administration forced the club to cut costs in the summer of 2009.

=== Hartlepool United ===
McSweeney was then snapped up by Hartlepool United in May 2009 by Hartlepool's then Director of Sport Chris Turner. He went on to make over 70 appearances for "the Monkey Hangers" playing as both a right back and a winger, scoring four goals and creating seventeen assists in all competitions. In May 2011 he was not offered a new contract by the club, along with nine other players from the 2010–11 squad.

=== Leyton Orient ===
On 16 June 2011, McSweeney signed for Leyton Orient, where he worked for a second time under Russell Slade. He signed a two-year contract. After a slow start to his Orient career due to injury caused in his debut game away at Walsall, McSweeney soon established himself as first choice right back. His adaptability proved a useful tool with Slade using McSweeney in both midfield and often as an accomplished left back to fill the club's problem position. After 73 appearances in all competitions, and with the team finishing three points outside the play-offs in 7th, McSweeney was released by Orient on 30 April 2013.

=== Carlisle United ===
Having not won in their opening six games of the 2013–14 season, Carlisle United manager Greg Abbott took McSweeney north to Cumbria, signing a four-month deal with Carlisle United on 4 September 2013. Abbott was dismissed as manager after McSweeney's first game, a 1–0 home defeat to Port Vale resulting in Graham Kavanagh becoming caretaker manager. McSweeney played a key role in the oncoming fixtures helping the team secure consecutive wins against Sheffield United, Notts County and Stevenage. As a result of this upturn in club fortunes Graham Kavanagh was appointed full-time manager. McSweeney went on to start ten games for the Cumbrians, winning six and drawing two, but was informed that his short-term deal would not be extended beyond January as a result of budget overspending.

=== Northampton Town ===
McSweeney became one of new manager Chris Wilder's first signings as manager of Northampton Town, signing him on a contract until the end of the 2013–14 season on 30 January 2014, with the team seven points adrift at the foot of the League Two table. McSweeney instantly slotted in at right back for the struggling "Cobblers" and went on to make eighteen appearances in the remaining twenty games helping the team secure safety in the division on the last day of the season with victory over Oxford. Despite the club's survival, McSweeney was not offered a renewed contract and was released at the end of the 2014 season along with eight others

=== Nuneaton Town ===
In September 2014, McSweeney signed for Nuneaton Town.

== Honours ==
Hucknall Town

- Northern Premier League: 2003–04

Hednesford Town

- Southern Premier League play-offs: 2005

Cork City

- FAI Cup: 2006–07

Stockport County

- Football League Two play-offs: 2008
