= Joe Gamble =

Irish footballer (born 1982)

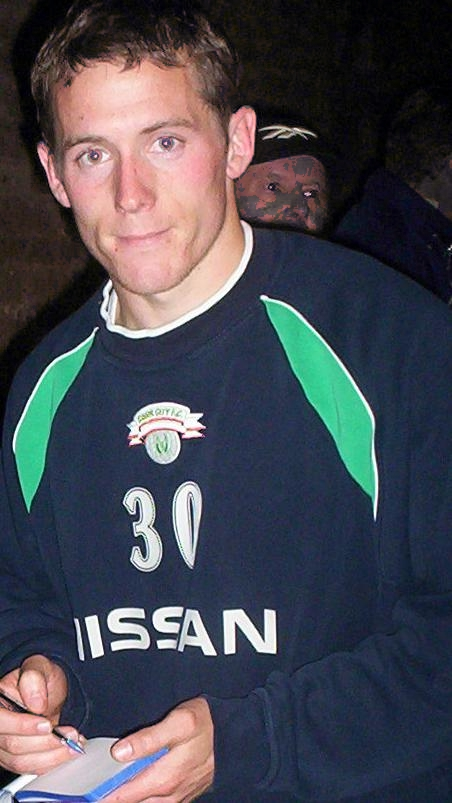

Personal information
- Full name: Joseph Finbar Gamble
- Date of birth: 14 January 1982 (age 44)
- Place of birth: Cork, Ireland
- Position: Midfielder

Youth career
- 1997: Everton Cork
- 1998: Cork City

Senior career*
Years	Team	Apps	(Gls)
1999–2000	Cork City		
2000–2004	Reading	7	(0)
2001	→ Crawley Town (loan)		
2003–2004	→ Barnet (loan)	41	(1)
2004–2010	Cork City	140	(4)
2010–2011	Hartlepool United	52	(3)
2011–2013	Limerick	37	(3)
2014–2015	DPMM FC	46	(1)
Total		316	(12)

International career
1999	Republic of Ireland U17	1	(0)
2000	Republic of Ireland U19	3	(0)
2001–2003	Republic of Ireland U21	8	(2)
2006	Republic of Ireland B	1	(0)
2007	Republic of Ireland	2	(0)
2011	League of Ireland XI	2	(0)

Managerial career
- 2014–2015: DPMM FC (player-assistant)
- 2019–2020: Cork City (assistant)
- * Club domestic league appearances and goals

Joseph Finbar Gamble (born 14 January 1982) is an Irish retired footballer.

Gamble's playing career spanned 16 years and saw him play for a number of teams across England and Ireland, most notably his local Cork City, as well as being capped twice for the national side before finishing his career in Singapore as player-assistant coach at DPMM FC. After retiring as a player, Gamble moved into full-time coaching before returning to Cork City as their first-team assistant coach.

== Club career ==
=== Cork City ===
Born in Cork, Gamble made his debut for Cork in the Super Cup against Bohemians in July 2000. Soon after he signed for Reading on a free transfer, before he returned to Cork City in 2004. He quickly established himself in the City first team and was a mainstay in the team that won the League of Ireland Premier Division in November 2005.

He later went on to win the FAI Cup and the Setanta Sports Cup while at the club.

=== Hartlepool United ===
With Cork struggling financially Gamble was allowed to look for a new club and joined EFL League One side Hartlepool United for a trial in December 2009.

Hartlepool's Director of Sport Chris Turner was impressed with Gamble and signed him permanently on 5 January 2010. He joined alongside former Cork teammate Denis Behan at Victoria Park.

In May 2011 he was not offered a new contract by the club, along with nine other players from the 2010–11 squad. Gamble made 61 appearances for Pools in all competitions for the club, scoring three times.

=== Limerick ===
Joe Gamble signed for Limerick on 23 June 2011. Gamble made his Limerick debut on 16 July 2011 against Athlone Town at Athlone Town Stadium. Joe Gamble was an integral part of the Limerick F.C side for the remaining of the 2011 season as Pat Scully's side pushed for promotion for from the First Division. Gamble made 13 league appearances in midfield for the Shannonsiders as they narrowly missed out on a promotion play-off place to Monaghan United.

=== DPMM FC ===
Following Gamble's release from Limerick, he went on a two-week trial with DPMM FC of the S.League, along with Francis Jeffers, on 24 November 2013. Following the completion of the trial Brunei DPMM announced they would be signing Gamble along with Robert Alviž and Boris Raspudić. He scored his first goal for the club against Young Lions on 23 August 2015. He won the 2015 S.League with DPMM on 21 November 2015.

== International career ==
In his early career at Cork City and Reading, Gamble made eight appearances for the Republic of Ireland under-21s, scoring once. The goal came as part of a 3–2 win against Denmark at his 'home' stadium, Turners Cross.

In 2006 Joe was nominated on the eircom League team of the season and was shortlisted for player of the year. His displays for 'City did not go unnoticed by Ireland manager Steve Staunton and in May 2006 he was called up to the Irish International team. He manned the substitutes bench in a match against Chile, but a poor performance saw Staunton unwilling to experiment late in the game. Gamble later played for the Republic of Ireland B team against Scotland in November 2006. In doing so he became only the third City player ever to do so.

In May 2007, it was announced that Gamble had again been drafted into Steve Staunton's Republic of Ireland squad to travel to the United States to take part in friendly matches against Ecuador and Bolivia. He made his international debut against Ecuador on 23 May 2007 at the Giants Stadium, and having suitably impressed, he started the game against Bolivia three days later at the Gillette Stadium, thus becoming the first home-based player to feature in a Republic of Ireland starting eleven since Glen Crowe's appearance against Greece in 2002.

== Coaching career ==
In 2014 and 2015, Gamble assisted Steve Kean on and off the field at Singapore Premier League club DPMM FC as they won the league title for the first time in their history. Retiring at the end of 2015, he then worked as a fitness coach at Waterford FC in 2017 and later in a similar role at his former club, Limerick, from 2018 to 2019. Gamble was assistant manager to Neale Fenn at Cork City from November 2019 to October 2020.

== Honours ==
Cork City

- League of Ireland: 2005
- FAI Cup: 2007
- Setanta Sports Cup: 2008

Limerick

- League of Ireland First Division: 2012
- Munster Senior Cup: 2011–12

DPMM FC

- S.League: 2015
- Singapore League Cup: 2014

Individual

- PFAI First Division Team of the Year: 2012
