= Colin Larkin (footballer) =

Irish footballer (born 1982)

Personal information
- Date of birth: 27 April 1982 (age 44)
- Place of birth: Dundalk, Ireland
- Position: Forward

Team information
- Current team: Sunderland RCA

Senior career*
| Years | Team | Apps | (Gls) |
| 1999–2002 | Wolverhampton Wanderers | 3 | (0) |
| 2001–2002 | → Kidderminster Harriers (loan) | 33 | (6) |
| 2002–2005 | Mansfield Town | 95 | (25) |
| 2005–2007 | Chesterfield | 80 | (11) |
| 2007–2009 | Northampton Town | 54 | (3) |
| 2009–2012 | Hartlepool United | 54 | (4) |
| 2012–2013 | Lincoln City | 29 | (8) |
| 2013 | Harrogate Town | 13 | (1) |
| 2013–2014 | Gateshead | 31 | (9) |
| 2014 | Harrogate Town | 1 | (0) |
| 2014–2015 | West Auckland Town | | |
| 2015– | Sunderland RCA | 1 | (3) |

International career
| 1999 | Republic of Ireland U17 | 2 | (0) |
- * Club domestic league appearances and goals as of 25 August 2014

Colin Larkin (born 27 April 1982) is an Irish professional footballer, who plays as a forward for Sunderland RCA.

He has previously played for Wolverhampton Wanderers, Kidderminster Harriers, Mansfield Town, Chesterfield, Northampton Town, Lincoln City and Gateshead.

== Playing career ==
Larkin began his professional career with Wolverhampton Wanderers. He progressed through their youth ranks to make his first team debut on 24 August 1999 in a League Cup exit to Wycombe Wanderers, where he scored within eight minutes of coming off the bench.

Despite this bright start to his senior career, he was unable to gain any real first team action at Molineux and managed just three (goalless) appearances over three seasons for the club. To gain playing time, he was loaned out to the then League 2 side Kidderminster Harriers during the 2001–2002 season where Larkin made a big impact starting 33 games and scoring 7 goals.

However, with chances limited, Larkin, with two years left on his contract at Wolves, joined Mansfield Town for a £125,000 fee in July 2002. He scored 25 goals over a three-year stay at Field Mill, but an apparent fall-out with then manager Carlton Palmer led to his eventual release to join Chesterfield in 2005 on a two-year contract.

Larkin netted 13 goals in total over a two-year spell at Chesterfield. When the club suffered relegation to League Two, Larkin remained in the third tier as he joined Northampton Town on a free transfer, on 28 June 2007 in a two-year deal.

On 7 August 2009, Larkin signed a contract with League One side Hartlepool United after impressing during a short trial period. In May 2011 he signed a new contract with the club. Larkin was released on 10 May 2012 and joined Lincoln City at the start of the 2012–13 season. He was released by Lincoln in March 2013 and subsequently signed for Harrogate Town and scored on his debut for Town in a 2–2 draw against Bishop's Stortford.

On 12 May 2013, Larkin signed for Gateshead. He made his debut on 10 August as a second-half substitute against Kidderminster Harriers. Larkin scored his first goal for Gateshead on 17 August 2013 in a 1–2 defeat against Barnet. At the end of the season, Larkin was released by Gateshead.

On 8 August 2014, Harrogate Town announced that Larkin had re-signed for the club. However, his second spell with the club would be short as they encountered an injury crisis amongst their forwards. As Larkin, who had recently had groin surgery was viewed as lacking the necessary match fitness to play games during the club's injury crisis, they took the decision to release him in order to be able to bring in new signings. He moved on to join West Auckland Town, reuniting him with his erstwhile Gateshead manager Anth Smith. However, Smith departed the club on 16 December 2014 and a month later Larkin was on the move again, joining Sunderland RCA.

Colin has linked up once again with David Rush and Anth Smith, this time in a coaching role for Sunderland College coaching the men's category 3 team. He is also head coach of Evolution Football Elite Academy.

== Career statistics ==
Appearances and goals by club, season and competition
| Club | Season | League | | | FA Cup | | League Cup | | Other^{[A]} | | Total | |
| Club | Season | Division | Apps | Goals | Apps | Goals | Apps | Goals | Apps | Goals | Apps | Goals |
|---|---|---|---|---|---|---|---|---|---|---|---|---|
| Wolverhampton Wanderers | 1999–2000 | First Division | 1 | 0 | 0 | 0 | 1 | 1 | 0 | 0 | 2 | 1 |
| Wolverhampton Wanderers | 2000–01 | First Division | 2 | 0 | 0 | 0 | 0 | 0 | 0 | 0 | 2 | 0 |
| Wolverhampton Wanderers | 2001–02 | First Division | 0 | 0 | 0 | 0 | 0 | 0 | 0 | 0 | 0 | 0 |
| Wolverhampton Wanderers | Total | | 3 | 0 | 0 | 0 | 1 | 1 | 0 | 0 | 4 | 1 |
| Kidderminster Harriers (loan) | 2001–02 | Third Division | 33 | 6 | 0 | 0 | 0 | 0 | 2 | 1 | 35 | 7 |
| Mansfield Town | 2002–03 | Second Division | 22 | 7 | 2 | 0 | 0 | 0 | 1 | 0 | 25 | 7 |
| Mansfield Town | 2003–04 | Third Division | 40 | 7 | 2 | 1 | 0 | 0 | 1 | 0 | 43 | 8 |
| Mansfield Town | 2004–05 | League Two | 33 | 11 | 2 | 0 | 1 | 0 | 2 | 0 | 38 | 11 |
| Mansfield Town | Total | | 95 | 25 | 6 | 1 | 1 | 0 | 4 | 0 | 106 | 26 |
| Chesterfield | 2005–06 | League One | 41 | 7 | 2 | 0 | 1 | 0 | 1 | 0 | 45 | 7 |
| Chesterfield | 2006–07 | League One | 39 | 4 | 1 | 0 | 3 | 2 | 2 | 0 | 45 | 6 |
| Chesterfield | Total | | 80 | 11 | 3 | 0 | 4 | 2 | 3 | 0 | 90 | 13 |
| Northampton Town | 2007–08 | League One | 33 | 2 | 4 | 1 | 2 | 0 | 1 | 0 | 40 | 3 |
| Northampton Town | 2008–09 | League One | 21 | 1 | 0 | 0 | 1 | 1 | 1 | 0 | 23 | 2 |
| Northampton Town | Total | | 54 | 3 | 4 | 1 | 3 | 1 | 2 | 0 | 63 | 5 |
| Hartlepool United | 2009–10 | League One | 22 | 1 | 1 | 0 | 2 | 0 | 1 | 0 | 26 | 1 |
| Hartlepool United | 2010–11 | League One | 30 | 3 | 2 | 0 | 1 | 0 | 1 | 0 | 34 | 3 |
| Hartlepool United | 2011–12 | League One | 2 | 0 | 0 | 0 | 0 | 0 | 1 | 0 | 3 | 0 |
| Hartlepool United | Total | | 54 | 4 | 3 | 0 | 3 | 0 | 3 | 0 | 63 | 4 |
| Lincoln City | 2012–13 | Conference Premier | 29 | 8 | 4 | 0 | 0 | 0 | 1 | 0 | 34 | 8 |
| Harrogate Town | 2012–13 | Conference North | 13 | 1 | 0 | 0 | 0 | 0 | 0 | 0 | 13 | 1 |
| Gateshead | 2013–14 | Conference Premier | 28 | 8 | 3 | 0 | 0 | 0 | 5 | 1 | 36 | 9 |
| Harrogate Town | 2014–15 | Conference North | 1 | 0 | 0 | 0 | 0 | 0 | 0 | 0 | 1 | 0 |
| Career totals | | | 390 | 66 | 23 | 2 | 12 | 4 | 20 | 2 | 445 | 74 |

A. The "Other" column constitutes appearances (including substitutes) and goals in the Football League Trophy, FA Trophy and play-offs.
