= Julian Cherel =

French footballer (born 1983)

Personal information
- Date of birth: 8 March 1983 (age 43)
- Place of birth: Caen, France
- Height: 6 ft 5 in (1.96 m)
- Position: Defender

Youth career
- Caen

Senior career*
Years	Team	Apps	(Gls)
- Mondeville
2009–2010	Hartlepool United	1	(0)
2010	Mansfield Town	0	(0)
- * Club domestic league appearances and goals as of 15:23, 8 October 2010 (UTC)

Julian Cherel (born 8 March 1983) is a French former professional footballer who last played as a defender for Northwich Victoria.

== Career ==
Cherel signed for Hartlepool United in September 2009, following a successful trial. Before joining Hartlepool he had a trial with Conference National club Altrincham. On signing for Hartlepool, he said; "The Manager is cool and all the players are cool and now I want to do as well as I can for the team and get them further up the table".

He made his debut for Hartlepool on 2 January 2010 in the 2–1 League One home win over Oldham Athletic. Oldham Athletic manager Paul Dickov confirmed on 19 September, that Cherel was playing on non-contract terms. On 6 October 2010, Cherel signed for Mansfield Town on a non-contract basis.

Cherel signed a short-term contract with Northwich Victoria in October 2010, making his debut against Glapwell in the FA Trophy Second Qualifying Round on 30 October."
