= Denis Behan =

Irish footballer & coach (born 1984)

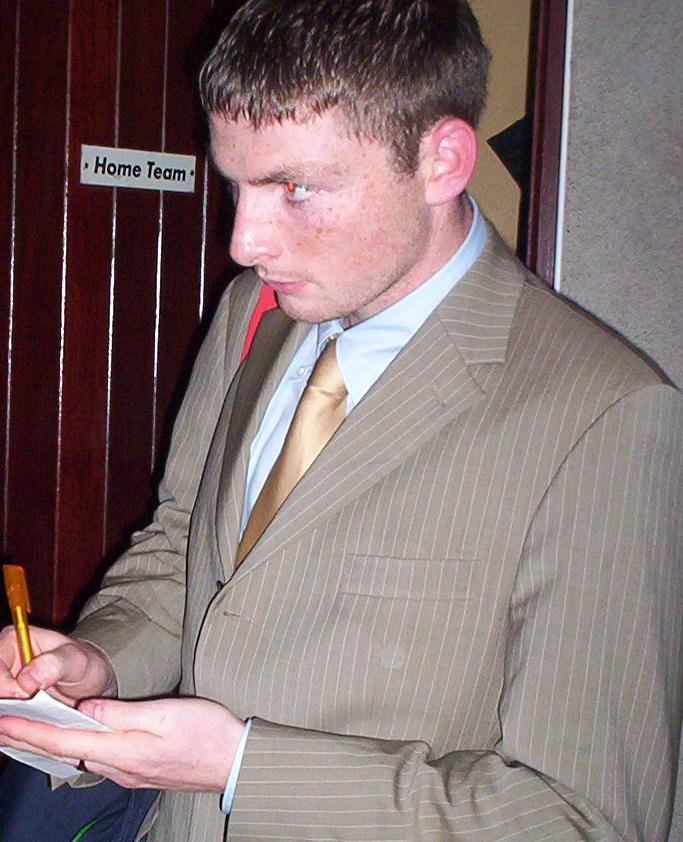

Personal information
- Date of birth: 2 January 1984 (age 42)
- Place of birth: Tralee, Ireland
- Position: Forward

Youth career
- Abbeyfeale
- Brentford

Senior career*
Years	Team	Apps	(Gls)
2002–2009	Cork City	171	(31)
2009–2011	Hartlepool United	42	(6)
2011–2012	Limerick	46	(17)
2013	Cork City	15	(2)
Total		274	(56)

International career
2004–2006	Republic of Ireland U21	2	(0)
2007–2008	Republic of Ireland U23	3	(0)
- * Club domestic league appearances and goals

Denis Behan (born 2 January 1984) is an Irish football coach and former player who played as a forward. He spent many years playing for League of Ireland clubs Cork City and Limerick, as well as in the English Football League for Hartlepool United.

== Youth level ==
Behan has won under age level Munster Youths and Munster Senior Cup medals, and was part of Cork City's run of two consecutive Under 21 League of Ireland. He has been capped for the Republic of Ireland at U16, U17, U18, U21 and U-23 levels. He scored in City's two successful U21 league finals, against Bohemians and St Patrick's Athletic.

== Senior career ==
=== Cork City ===
Behan joined Cork City from Brentford. He became a regular first team squad member and was known for his knack of scoring spectacular goals, he is currently the all-time top scorer in the Setanta Cup. Behan came on in the penultimate game of the 2005 LOI season against Derry City, and provided an assist as Cork City won only their second League of Ireland title.

In September 2007, Behan recorded his first senior hat trick for Cork City in their FAI Cup quarter-final Replay at home to local rivals Waterford United. He also scored the winner in the 2007 FAI Cup Final when Cork City took on Longford Town.

=== Hartlepool United ===
On 16 July 2009, it was confirmed that Cork City had accepted a bid from Hartlepool United to take Behan and fellow Cork City team-mate Colin Healy to Victoria Park. However, only Behan signed as Healy accepted a late offer from Championship side Ipswich Town.

On 22 August 2009, he scored his first goal for Hartlepool (and the club's first of the new season) in a 2–1 loss to Bristol Rovers. He got his second with a sublime free-kick from around 30 yards out in a 3–0 win at Oldham on 5 September, and his third goal for the club ensured a 2–2 draw at Stockport County on 29 September. A fourth followed in the next game, at Exeter City on 3 October, where he opened the scoring after a defensive blunder. Pools went on to lose 3–1, however.

In May 2011, he was not offered a new contract by the club, along with nine other players from the 2010–11 squad.

=== Limerick ===
Behan signed for Limerick on 23 June 2011 along with Joe Gamble.

=== Cork City ===
Behan signed for Cork City on 31 January 2013. He had signed for College Corinthians earlier in the week but was released from his contract once Cork City became interested. Behan had his contract cancelled by mutual consent on 30 July 2013.

== Personal life ==
Behan was raised in Abbeyfeale, County Limerick, Ireland, but was born in Tralee, County Kerry. He managed an under-15 Carrigaline United schoolboy side during his time at Cork City.

== Honours ==
Cork City

- League of Ireland (1): 2005
- FAI Cup (1): 2007
- Setanta Sports Cup (1): 2008

Limerick'

- League of Ireland First Division (1): 2012
- Munster Senior Cup (1): 2011–12
