= Billy Greulich =

English footballer (born 1991)

Billy Greulich-Smith
Personal information
- Full name: Corey Patrick Wilhelm Greulich
- Date of birth: 24 April 1991 (age 35)
- Place of birth: Sunderland, England
- Height: 6 ft 5 in (1.96 m)
- Position: Forward

Team information
- Current team: Shildon

Youth career
- Middlesbrough
- Sunderland
- Luton Town
- ????–2007: Watford
- 2007–2009: Brandon United

Senior career*
Years	Team	Apps	(Gls)
2009–2011	Hartlepool United	4	(0)
2011–2012	Durham City	24	(4)
2012–	Shildon	245	(106)
- * Club domestic league appearances and goals as of 18:22, 11 September 2018(UTC)

Billy Greulich-Smith (born 24 April 1991) is an English footballer who plays for Shildon.

== Playing career ==
Greulich had a varied career as a youth player. He was at the academies of Watford, Middlesbrough and Sunderland. During his time at Middlesbrough he was part of the successful U13 team that won the prestigious Cascais Tournament in Portugal

Following his release from Sunderland he signed as a youth team player with Luton Town but was unfortunate to see his contract cancelled when Luton went into Administration

He ended up at Northern Football League side Brandon United before the end of his teenage years. After a trial with Hartlepool United in summer 2009, he made it into The Football League, signing his first professional contract with the club in August 2009.

He made his debut in a 1–0 home win over Tranmere Rovers on 24 October 2009, replacing Adam Boyd in the 73rd minute.

Greulich made a further three substitute appearances over the following six weeks, following an injury crisis at the club. Having gained first-team experience, he signed a new contract at the end of the season.

In May 2011 Greulich was not offered a new contract by the club, along with nine other players, and was released.

Moving back into non-league football, Greulich joined Durham City, of the Northern Premier League for the 2011–12 season; by the time of his transfer to Shildon in January 2012, he had scored 4 goals in 24 league appearances for Durham.

He joined Shildon early in 2012, and enjoyed a more prolific second half of the season than his first, scoring 6 goals in 14 appearances for the club.

== Career statistics ==
(Correct as of 15 May 2012)

Club	Season	League		FA Cup		League Cup		Other		Total	
Club	Season	Apps	Goals	Apps	Goals	Apps	Goals	Apps	Goals	Apps	Goals
Hartlepool	2009–10	4	0	1	0	0	0	0	0	5	0
Hartlepool	2009–10	0	0	0	0	0	0	0	0	0	0
Durham City	2011–12	24	4	1	0	0	0	5	1	30	5
Shildon	2011–12	14	6	0	0	0	0	0	0	14	6
Career total		42	10	2	0	3	0	5	1	52	11

- Listed in the "Other" column are one appearance, without scoring, for Durham City in the 2011–12 League Challenge Cup; 4 appearances and one goal for Durham in the 2011–12 FA Trophy and a further goalless appearance in the 2011–12 Durham Senior Cup.
