= Jonny Rowell =

English footballer (born 1989)

Personal information
- Full name: Jonathan Michael Rowell
- Date of birth: 10 September 1989 (age 37)
- Place of birth: Newcastle upon Tyne, England
- Height: 1.80 m (5 ft 11 in)
- Position: Midfielder

Youth career
- 2001–2005: Newcastle United
- 2006–2008: Hartlepool United

Senior career*
Years	Team	Apps	(Gls)
2008–2010	Hartlepool United	12	(0)
2010–2011	Olympic Charleroi	27	(4)
2011–2015	Waasland-Beveren	62	(3)
2016–2017	FC Eindhoven	13	(0)
2018	Berchem Sport	7	(0)
2018–2024	Dender EH	90	(7)
- * Club domestic league appearances and goals as of 21:32, 23 June 2024 (UTC)

Jonathan Michael "Jonny" Rowell (born 10 September 1989) is an English footballer who plays as a midfielder.

Rowell began his career in his native England and played in League One for Hartlepool United but he has predominantly spent his career in Belgium and played in the Belgian Pro League for Waasland-Beveren; he also played in the Challenger Pro League for Dender EH but left Dender following their promotion to the top flight. He has also played in the Belgian lower leagues for Olympic Charleroi and Berchem Sport. Rowell has also had a brief stint playing in the Netherlands for Eerste Divisie side FC Eindhoven.

== Career ==
=== Early career ===
Jonny began playing football for Newcastle United in their academy since he was nine up until he his was 16. Whilst in the Under-16s, he played alongside future England international Andy Carroll. After being let go by the Premiership club, the midfielder was signed by League One club Hartlepool United after a successful trial in January 2006.

He signed an early first team contract in January 2008 to keep him with North-East club, due to apparent interest from other clubs.

Rowell was named in the first team squad in the 2007–08 season against Crewe Alexandra and Bristol Rovers, however in both games he was an unused sub. Later in the season, an injury in a reserve team match ruled him out for the rest of the season. He went on to win the Youth Team's Player of the Year at the end of the season as voted for by the Hartlepool supporters.

Rowell made his first appearance for Hartlepool United the season after in a Football League Trophy game against fellow League One side Leicester City on 2 September 2008, however Hartlepool went on to lose this match 3–0. He made his first ever League start for an injury struck Hartlepool, just three months later against Hereford United. Hartlepool boss Danny Wilson said that he thought "Rowell's debut was terrific".

=== Move to Belgium ===
He was then released by Hartlepool at the end of the 2009–10 season and signed for Belgian Third Division B side Olympic Charleroi on 7 July 2010 where he soon became a fan favourite. Olympic Charleroi finished 8th at the end of the season.

At the end of the 2010–11 season, Rowell went on trial with English Conference National side Gateshead, however he ended up signing for Belgian Second Division side Waasland-Beveren on a free transfer. In his first season with Waasland-Beveren, they won promotion via the play-offs to Belgian Pro League. He made his first appearance in the Belgian Pro League in a 1–2 victory against Beerschot AC on 24 November 2012.

Rowell turned down a new contract with Waasland-Beveren at the end of the 2014–15 season to pursue a deal elsewhere.

=== FC Eindhoven ===
After leaving Waasland-Beveren, Rowell missed out on a season of football because of deals falling through and broken promises. In August 2016, Rowell signed for Eerste Divisie side FC Eindhoven. Rowell made 13 appearances for the Dutch side.

=== Return to Belgium ===
Rowell moved back to Belgium signing for Berchem Sport in January 2018.

In August 2018, Rowell signed for Belgian National Division 1 side Dender EH. In September 2020, Dender coach Regi Van Acker confirmed that he had turned a transfer bid for Rowell from fellow National Division 1 side K.S.V. Roeselare. On 21 April 2021, Rowell signed a two-year contract extension with Dender. Rowell spent the majority of the 2022–23 struggling with injuries and made only 16 league appearances with Dender back in the Challenger Pro League. Despite this, at the end of the season, he signed a new contract to keep him at the club until 2024. Following Dender's promotion to the Belgian Pro League, it was announced in June 2024 that Rowell had left the club following the expiration of his contract. He made 94 appearances for the club in all competitions.

== Personal life ==
Rowell attended Emmanuel College in Gateshead. He has dual British–Belgian nationality. He is a fan of his local side Premier League side Newcastle United, the side where Rowell spent eight years as a junior but Rowell also follows the results of his former club Hartlepool.

In December 2018, he got married and on 1 September 2019, his wife gave birth to their son Jack. Only five days later, Rowell scored in a 2-0 derby win for Dender EH against RWD Molenbeek – a game that his wife insisted he played in.

In May 2026, Rowell participated in the SKB Fan Cup, the 5-a-side tournament of his ex-team SK Beveren. He scored 14 goals in 4 games and provided the assist for the first ever goal of Robin Maes as well as the goal of Steven Wenselaers, both former members of the W-Btv media team. He also played alongside his old Dender EH-teammate Wesley Vanbelle, family member Hans De Bruyn, Diego Pieters and Niels De Bruyne.

== Career statistics ==
As of 30 March 2015

Club Performance			League		Domestic Cup		League Cup		Other^{[A]}		Total	
Club	Season	League	Apps	Goals	Apps	Goals	Apps	Goals	Apps	Goals	Apps	Goals
Hartlepool United	2008–09	League One	6	0	0	0	0	0	1	0	7	0
Hartlepool United	2009–10	League One	6	0	0	0	0	0	1	0	7	0
Hartlepool United	Total		12	0	0	0	0	0	2	0	14	0
Olympic Charleroi	2010–11	Belgian Third Division B	27	4	0	0	0	0	0	0	27	4
Olympic Charleroi	Total		27	4	0	0	0	0	0	0	27	4
Waasland-Beveren	2011–12	Belgian Second Division	15	1	0	0	0	0	3	0	18	1
Waasland-Beveren	2012–13	Belgian Pro League	16	1	2	0	0	0	0	0	18	1
Waasland-Beveren	2013–14	Belgian Pro League	8	0	1	0	0	0	0	0	9	0
Waasland-Beveren	2014–15	Belgian Pro League	23	1	1	0	0	0	0	0	24	1
Total			62	3	4	0	0	0	3	0	69	3
Career totals			101	7	4	0	0	0	5	0	110	7

A. The "Other" column constitutes appearances and goals (including those as a substitute) in the Football League Trophy and play-off games.

== Honours ==
Hartlepool United

- Youth Team Player of the Season: 2007–08

Waasland-Beveren

- Belgian Second Division play-offs: 2011–12

F.C.V. Dender E.H.

- Belgian National Division 1: 2021–22
- Challenger Pro League runner-up: 2023–24
