= 2003–04 Hartlepool United F.C. season =

Hartlepool United
2003–04 season
- Owner: IOR
- Chairman: Ken Hodcroft
- Manager: Neale Cooper
- Stadium: Victoria Park
- Football League Second Division: 6th
- FA Cup: Third round (eliminated by Sunderland)
- League Cup: Second round (eliminated by West Bromwich Albion)
- League Trophy: First round (eliminated by Oldham Athletic)
- Top goalscorer: League: Eifion Williams (13); All: Eifion Williams (14)
- Highest home attendance: 7,448 (vs Sheffield Wednesday)
- Lowest home attendance: 4,135 (vs Colchester United)
- Average home league attendance: 5,419
- Biggest win: 8–1 (vs. Grimsby Town)
- Biggest defeat: 4–0 (vs. Blackpool)

The 2003–04 season was Hartlepool United's 95th year in existence and their first season in Football League Second Division since 1993–94. Along with competing in the Football League Second Division, the club also participated in the FA Cup, Football League Cup and Football League Trophy. The season covered the period from 1 July 2003 to 30 June 2004.

== Background and pre-season ==
Having participated in the Third Division since 1994–95, the 2003–04 season saw Hartlepool competing back in the third tier once again having earned promotion in the previous season. Hartlepool had started the 2002–03 campaign in fine form, but suffered the departure of manager Chris Turner to Sheffield Wednesday in early November 2002. Turner had turned around the club's fortunes since his appointment in February 1999. After ensuring survival for Hartlepool in the Third Division in his first season, Turner oversaw three consecutive play-off finishes. Turner's successor was Mike Newell who inherited a side four points clear at the top of the league. Hartlepool managed to build a 12-point lead at the top of the division by early 2003 ahead of Rushden & Diamonds. Nevertheless, Hartlepool would suffer a poor run of form in the Spring, eventually missing out on the title on the final day of the season. Despite winning promotion in second place, Newell's contract was not renewed.

In June 2003, former Ross County manager Neale Cooper was appointed as Newell's successor in a surprise decision. Early in his tenure, Cooper lost key defender Graeme Lee on a free transfer. Lee was replaced by Bury's Michael Nelson.

== Review and events ==
Hartlepool's 2003–04 campaign began with an away fixture at Peterborough United which Hartlepool won. This solid start to the season continued, including a notable 8–1 home victory against Grimsby Town. By Christmas, Hartlepool were just outside the play-off positions.

In the FA Cup, Hartlepool defeated Whitby Town and Burton Albion, the latter of which was televised. This earned them an away tie at local team Sunderland in the third round. The Sunderland match saw an attendance of over 40,000 supporters; breaking the attendance record for any Hartlepool match. The First Division side narrowly won 1–0 courtesy of an impressive goal by Julio Arca.

In April, Hartlepool won five consecutive matches to maintain their play-off hunt. This play-off finish was ultimately secured late in the season. In the play-off semi-final first leg, Hartlepool faced Bristol City at Victoria Park in front of a near sell out crowd. The away side took the lead in the first half before Joel Porter found a late equaliser for Hartlepool. In the away tie at Ashton Gate, Antony Sweeney gave Hartlepool the lead after an hour. Hartlepool conceded with two minutes to go before Bristol City found a winner in injury time. This was Hartlepool's fourth play-off semi-final defeat in five years.

== Players ==
As of End of Season.

=== First-team squad ===
Note: Flags indicate national team as defined under FIFA eligibility rules; some limited exceptions apply. Players may hold more than one non-FIFA nationality.

No.	Pos.	Nation	Player
1	GK	WAL	Anthony Williams
2	DF	ENG	Michael Barron
3	DF	ENG	Mark Robinson
4	MF	ENG	Mark Tinkler
5	DF	ENG	Michael Nelson
6	DF	ENG	Chris Westwood
7	MF	ENG	Darrell Clarke
8	MF	ENG	Ritchie Humphreys
9	FW	WAL	Eifion Williams
12	MF	NIR	Stephen Carson
14	MF	GUY	Neil Danns
15	FW	ENG	Adam Boyd
16	DF	SCO	Hugh Robertson
17	FW	WAL	Jermaine Easter
18	MF	ENG	Antony Sweeney

No.	Pos.	Nation	Player
19	GK	ENG	Jim Provett
20	DF	ENG	John Brackstone
21	MF	ENG	Steven Istead
22	MF	ENG	Matty Robson
23	FW	ENG	Paul Robinson
24	DF	SCO	Andy Jordan
25	MF	SCO	Gavin Strachan
27	FW	ENG	David Foley
28	DF	SCO	Ryan McCann
29	DF	ENG	Darren Craddock
30	GK	GRE	Dimitrios Konstantopoulos
31	FW	ENG	Jack Wilkinson
32	FW	AUS	Joel Porter
33	DF	SCO	Scott Walker
34	FW	ENG	Andrew Appleby

== Transfers ==
=== Transfers in ===
Date	Position	Player	From	Fee	Ref
26 June 2003	DF	Michael Nelson	Bury	£70,000	
11 July 2003	FW	Marco Gabbiadini	Northampton Town	Free	
30 July 2003	DF	Andy Jordan	Cardiff City	Free	
30 July 2003	FW	Paul Robinson	Blackpool	Free	
8 August 2003	MF	Gavin Strachan	Southend United	Free	
28 August 2003	DF	Ryan McCann	Celtic	Free	
17 October 2003	GK	Dimitrios Konstantopoulos	Farense	Free	
25 November 2003	FW	Joel Porter	Sydney Olympic	Free	
15 January 2004	DF	Scott Walker	Dunfermline	Free	
29 January 2004	DF	Hugh Robertson	Ross County	Undisclosed	
20 February 2004	MF	Stephen Carson	Barnsley	Free	

=== Loans in ===
Date	Position	Player	From	Loan Length	Ref
25 November 2003	FW	Danny Byrne	Manchester United	23 December 2003	
10 December 2003	MF	Chris Shuker	Manchester City	10 March 2004	
13 March 2004	MF	Neil Danns	Blackburn Rovers	30 June 2004 (Note: The first loan was for one month but was extended on 15 April 2004 until the end of the season.)	

=== Transfers out ===
Date	Position	Player	From	Fee	Ref
19 June 2003	DF	Graeme Lee	Sheffield Wednesday	Free	
19 June 2003	MF	Paul Smith	Sheffield Wednesday	Free	
1 July 2003	FW	Gordon Watson	Retired	—N/a	
19 August 2003	MF	Tommy Widdrington	Macclesfield Town	Free	
21 August 2003	DF	Gordon Simms	Derry City	Free	
31 October 2003	FW	Kevin Henderson	Carlisle United	Free	
12 January 2004	FW	Marcus Richardson	Lincoln City	Free	
19 January 2004	FW	Marco Gabbiadini	Retired	—N/a	
2 February 2004	MF	Paul Arnison	Carlisle United	Free	
3 February 2004	DF	Jon Bass		Released	

=== Loans out ===
Date	Position	Player	From	Loan Length	Ref
22 August 2003	FW	Marcus Richardson	Lincoln City	20 October 2003 (Note: The first loan was for one month but was extended on 25 September 2003 for an additional month.)	
11 September 2003	FW	Kevin Henderson	Carlisle United	31 October 2003	
31 October 2003	MF	Paul Arnison	Carlisle United	2 February 2004	
14 November 2003	FW	Adam Boyd	Boston United	20 January 2004	
21 November 2003	GK	Anthony Williams	Swansea City	21 December 2003	
8 December 2003	FW	Marcus Richardson	Lincoln City	12 January 2004	
11 December 2003	DF	Mark Robinson	Spennymoor United	11 January 2004	
23 January 2004	GK	Anthony Williams	Stockport County	30 June 2004	
2 February 2004	FW	Adam Boyd	Boston United	2 March 2004	
6 February 2004	FW	Jermaine Easter	Cambridge United	12 May 2004	
20 February 2004	DF	Mark Robinson	Scarborough	20 March 2004	

== Competitions ==
=== Pre-season friendlies ===
16 July 2003	TOP Oss	0–6	Hartlepool United	Oss
19:00			Williams; Clarke; Richardson; Henderson	Stadium: Frans Heesen Stadion

18 July 2003	Heerenveen	3–3	Hartlepool United	Heerenveen
19:00	Håkansson		Westwood; Gabbiadini; Tinkler	Stadium: Abe Lenstra Stadion

23 July 2003	Sunderland Reserves	1–1	Hartlepool United	Sunderland
15:00	Flo		Robinson	Stadium: Academy of Light

25 July 2003	Leeds United	4–3	Hartlepool United	Leeds
19:00			Robinson; Williams; Clarke	Stadium: Elland Road

27 July 2003	Hartlepool United	1–3	Sheffield Wednesday	Hartlepool
15:00	Henderson 42'		Owusu 12'; McClaren 13'; Armstrong 56'	Stadium: Victoria Park

29 July 2003	Berwick Rangers	2–3	Hartlepool United	Berwick-upon-Tweed
19:00			Robinson (pen.); Williams; Clarke	Stadium: Shielfield Park

30 July 2003	Billingham Town	1–4	Hartlepool United	Billingham
19:00			Moore 3', 41'; Henderson 30'; Robson 78'	Stadium: Bedford Terrace

1 August 2003	Hartlepool United	0–6	Newcastle United	Hartlepool
19:00			Bellamy 9'; Shearer 17', 28', 35'; Solano 47'; Speed 52'	Stadium: Victoria Park; Attendance: 4,712

2 August 2003	Whitby Town	0–1	Hartlepool United	Whitby
15:00			Henderson 44'	Stadium: Turnbull Ground

=== Football League Second Division ===
==== League table ====
Pos	Team	Pld	W	D	L	GF	GA	GD	Pts	Promotion or relegation
4	Brighton & Hove Albion (O, P)	46	22	11	13	64	43	+21	77	Qualification for the Second Division play-offs
5	Swindon Town	46	20	13	13	76	58	+18	73	Qualification for the Second Division play-offs
6	Hartlepool United	46	20	13	13	76	61	+15	73	Qualification for the Second Division play-offs
7	Port Vale	46	21	10	15	73	63	+10	73	
8	Tranmere Rovers	46	17	16	13	59	56	+3	67	

Rules for classification: In the Football League goals scored (GF) takes precedence over goal difference (GD).
(O) Play-off winners; (P) Promoted

==== Results summary ====
Overall								Home						Away					
Pld	W	D	L	GF	GA	GD	Pts	W	D	L	GF	GA	GD	W	D	L	GF	GA	GD
46	20	13	13	76	61	+15	73	10	8	5	39	24	+15	10	5	8	37	37	0

==== Results by matchday ====
Round	1	2	3	4	5	6	7	8	9	10	11	12	13	14	15	16	17	18	19	20	21	22	23	24	25	26	27	28	29	30	31	32	33	34	35	36	37	38	39	40	41	42	43	44	45	46
Ground	A	H	A	H	A	H	H	A	A	H	H	A	H	A	A	H	A	H	A	H	A	H	H	A	H	A	H	A	A	A	H	A	H	A	H	H	A	H	A	H	H	A	H	A	H	A
Result	W	D	D	W	L	D	W	W	L	D	W	D	D	L	W	D	L	W	L	W	L	D	L	W	W	D	L	W	D	L	D	W	W	W	L	D	W	L	L	W	W	W	W	W	L	D
Position	6	6	12	5	9	12	4	2	6	7	4	5	5	9	7	7	8	6	8	5	10	8	11	10	6	8	9	8	9	10	10	11	8	5	7	8	6	9	9	7	6	6	6	5	6	6

A = Away; H = Home; W = Win; D = Draw; L = Loss

==== Results ====
9 August 2003 1	Peterborough United	3–4	Hartlepool United	Peterborough
15:00	Arber 18'; Clarke 23', 51'		Strachan 38'; Robinson 55'; Robson 70'; Nelson 85'	Stadium: London Road; Attendance: 5,965 (990 away fans); Referee: Grant Hegley

16 August 2003 2	Hartlepool United	0–0	Tranmere Rovers	Hartlepool
15:00				Stadium: Victoria Park; Attendance: 5,357 (445 away fans); Referee: Lee Mason

23 August 2003 3	Bristol City	1–1	Hartlepool United	Bristol
15:00	Peacock 56'		Gabbiadini 73'	Stadium: Ashton Gate; Attendance: 10,730 (250 away fans); Referee: Andy Hall

25 August 2003 4	Hartlepool United	2–0	Port Vale	Hartlepool
15:00	Robinson 2'; Gabbiadini 88' (pen.)			Stadium: Victoria Park; Attendance: 5,314 (478 away fans); Referee: Paul Robinson

30 August 2003 5	Luton Town	3–2	Hartlepool United	Luton
15:00	Howard 6', 23'; McSheffrey 14'		Clarke 40'; Robinson 71' (pen.)	Stadium: Kenilworth Road; Attendance: 5,515 (573 away fans); Referee: Brian Curson

6 September 2003 6	Hartlepool United	0–0	Oldham Athletic	Hartlepool
15:00				Stadium: Victoria Park; Attendance: 5,728 (836 away fans); Referee: Andy Penn

12 September 2003 7	Hartlepool United	8–1	Grimsby Town	Hartlepool
19:45	Rowan 19' (o.g.); Robinson 20' (pen.), 56', 80'; Strachan 28'; Humphreys 31'; Gabbiadini 60'; Williams 66'		Rowan 48'	Stadium: Victoria Park; Attendance: 5,528 (272 away fans); Referee: Scott Mathieson

16 September 2003 8	Stockport County	1–2	Hartlepool United	Stockport
19:45	Wilbraham 43'		Williams 8'; Gabbiadini 54'	Stadium: Edgeley Park; Attendance: 4,021; Referee: Tony Leake

20 September 2003 9	Brentford	2–1	Hartlepool United	Brentford
15:00	Sonko 13'; Wright 48'		Tinkler 42'	Stadium: Griffin Park; Attendance: 4,501 (592 away fans); Referee: Tony Bates

27 September 2003 10	Hartlepool United	0–0	Brighton & Hove Albion	Hartlepool
15:00				Stadium: Victoria Park; Attendance: 5,443 (446 away fans); Referee: Alan Butler

30 September 2003 11	Hartlepool United	2–0	Wrexham	Hartlepool
19:45	Clarke 23', 37'			Stadium: Victoria Park; Attendance: 4,677 (104 away fans); Referee: Chris Foy

4 October 2003 12	AFC Bournemouth	2–2	Hartlepool United	Bournemouth
15:00	Holmes 79'; Feeney 81'		Tinkler 10'; Strachan 90'	Stadium: Dean Court; Attendance: 6,342 (263 away fans); Referee: Steve Tomlin

10 October 2003 13	Hartlepool United	1–1	Sheffield Wednesday	Hartlepool
19:45	Gabbiadini 84'		Owusu 47'	Stadium: Victoria Park; Attendance: 7,448 (916 away fans); Referee: Graham Salisbury

18 October 2003 14	Blackpool	4–0	Hartlepool United	Blackpool
15:00	Douglas 4'; Taylor 20', 40', 72' (pen.)			Stadium: Bloomfield Road; Attendance: 6,871 (1,691 away fans); Referee: Mike Pike

21 October 2003 15	Chesterfield	1–2	Hartlepool United	Chesterfield
19:45	Cade 53'		Evatt 26' (o.g.); Robinson 76'	Stadium: Recreation Ground; Attendance: 3,411 (321 away fans); Referee: Lee Probert

25 October 2003 16	Hartlepool United	1–1	Wycombe Wanderers	Hartlepool
15:00	Barron 40'		Currie 3'	Stadium: Victoria Park; Attendance: 5,153 (183 away fans); Referee: Martin Atkinson

1 November 2003 17	Notts County	1–0	Hartlepool United	Nottingham
15:00	Baldry 63'			Stadium: Meadow Lane; Attendance: 5,011 (675 away fans); Referee: Paul Danson

15 November 2003 18	Hartlepool United	2–1	Rushden & Diamonds	Hartlepool
15:00	Strachan 41' (pen.); Wilkinson 75'		Jack 57'	Stadium: Victoria Park; Attendance: 4,944 (203 away fans); Referee: Chris Foy

22 November 2003 19	Plymouth Argyle	2–0	Hartlepool United	Plymouth
15:00	Keith 45'; Lowndes 48'			Stadium: Home Park; Attendance: 9,000 (93 away fans); Referee: Iain Williamson

29 November 2003 20	Hartlepool United	2–0	Swindon Town	Hartlepool
15:00	Strachan 18' (pen.); Wilkinson 86'			Stadium: Victoria Park; Attendance: 4,493 (358 away fans); Referee: Eddie Evans

13 December 2003 21	QPR	4–1	Hartlepool United	London
15:00	Gallen 27', 38'; Padula 34'; Ainsworth 50'		Williams 71'	Stadium: Loftus Road; Attendance: 15,003 (615 away fans); Referee: Andre Marriner

20 December 2003 22	Hartlepool United	0–0	Colchester United	Hartlepool
15:00				Stadium: Victoria Park; Attendance: 4,135 (135 away fans); Referee: Tony Leake

26 December 2003 23	Hartlepool United	1–2	Barnsley	Hartlepool
15:00	Williams 22'		Betsy 45', 69'	Stadium: Victoria Park; Attendance: 6,520 (925 away fans); Referee: Mark Halsey

28 December 2003 24	Oldham Athletic	0–2	Hartlepool United	Oldham
15:00			Williams 45'; Porter 79'	Stadium: Boundary Park; Attendance: 6,243 (541 away fans); Referee: Joe Ross

10 January 2004 25	Hartlepool United	1–0	Peterborough United	Hartlepool
15:00	Williams 37'			Stadium: Victoria Park; Attendance: 4,855 (192 away fans); Referee: David Pugh

17 January 2004 26	Tranmere Rovers	0–0	Hartlepool United	Birkenhead
15:00				Stadium: Prenton Park; Attendance: 7,418 (366 away fans); Referee: Mark Cowburn

24 January 2004 27	Hartlepool United	1–2	Bristol City	Hartlepool
15:00	Tinkler 70'		Peacock 54'; Tinnion 76'	Stadium: Victoria Park; Attendance: 5,375 (660 away fans); Referee: Alan Kaye

27 January 2004 28	Port Vale	2–5	Hartlepool United	Stoke-on-Trent
19:45	Brooker 8'; Cummins 87'		Shuker 6'; Humphreys 31'; Nelson 69'; Williams 74'; Clarke 83'	Stadium: Vale Park; Attendance: 4,845 (95 away fans); Referee: Scott Mathieson

7 February 2004 29	Barnsley	2–2	Hartlepool United	Barnsley
15:00	Nardiello 56'; Hayward 80'		Williams 27'; Tinkler 67'	Stadium: Oakwell Stadium; Attendance: 9,220 (752 away fans); Referee: Paul Robinson

14 February 2004 30	Sheffield Wednesday	1–0	Hartlepool United	Sheffield
15:00	Ndumbu-Nsungu 80' (pen.)			Stadium: Hillsborough Stadium; Attendance: 20,732 (2,144 away fans); Referee: Alan Butler

20 February 2004 31	Hartlepool United	1–1	Blackpool	Hartlepool
19:45	Robertson 51'		Sheron 74'	Stadium: Victoria Park; Attendance: 5,497 (403 away fans); Referee: Mark Clattenburg

28 February 2004 32	Wycombe Wanderers	3–4	Hartlepool United	High Wycombe
15:00	Simpemba 8'; McSporran 23'; Tyson 64'		Williams 4', 46'; Robertson 10'; Tinkler 39' (pen.)	Stadium: The Causeway Stadium; Attendance: 4,731 (349 away fans); Referee: Mark Warren

2 March 2004 33	Hartlepool United	2–0	Chesterfield	Hartlepool
19:45	Williams 52'; Tinkler 71'			Stadium: Victoria Park; Attendance: 4,736 (195 away fans); Referee: Carl Boyeson

6 March 2004 34	Colchester United	1–2	Hartlepool United	Colchester
15:00	Halford 35'		Nelson 17'; Istead 78'	Stadium: Layer Road; Attendance: 3,348 (320 away fans); Referee: Trevor Kettle

13 March 2004 35	Hartlepool United	1–4	QPR	Hartlepool
15:00	Porter 88'		Furlong 48', 74'; Gallen 52'; Rowlands 76'	Stadium: Victoria Park; Attendance: 6,519 (850 away fans); Referee: Ray Oliver

20 March 2004 36	Hartlepool United	2–2	Stockport County	Hartlepool
17:45	Williams 10'; Porter 58'		Lambert 20' (pen.); Daly 21'	Stadium: Victoria Park; Attendance: 4,674 (281 away fans); Referee: Phil Prosser

20 March 2004 37	Grimsby Town	0–2	Hartlepool United	Cleethorpes
15:00			Boyd 29', 87'	Stadium: Blundell Park; Attendance: 4,303 (506 away fans); Referee: Lee Mason

27 March 2004 38	Hartlepool United	1–2	Brentford	Hartlepool
15:00	Boyd 38'		Tabb 2'; Dobson 33'	Stadium: Victoria Park; Attendance: 5,206 (235 away fans); Referee: Michael Ryan

3 April 2004 39	Brighton & Hove Albion	2–0	Hartlepool United	Brighton
15:00	Knight 68'; Iwelumo 90'			Stadium: Withdean Stadium; Attendance: 6,257 (203 away fans); Referee: Joe Ross

6 April 2004 40	Hartlepool United	4–3	Luton Town	Hartlepool
19:45	Sweeney 14'; Boyd 53', 90' (pen.); Robertson 55'		Howard 3'; Leary 31', 59'	Stadium: Victoria Park; Attendance: 4,434 (284 away fans); Referee: Fraser Stretton

10 April 2004 41	Hartlepool United	2–1	AFC Bournemouth	Hartlepool
15:00	Boyd 38', 69'		Hayter 31'	Stadium: Victoria Park; Attendance: 5,544 (238 away fans); Referee: Phil Joslin

12 April 2004 42	Wrexham	1–2	Hartlepool United	Wrexham
15:00	Barrett 71'		Clarke 41'; Danns 63'	Stadium: Racecourse Ground; Attendance: 3,786 (425 away fans); Referee: Trevor Parkes

17 April 2004 43	Hartlepool United	4–0	Notts County	Hartlepool
15:00	Humphreys 42'; Boyd 55', 56'; Robertson 69'			Stadium: Victoria Park; Attendance: 5,629 (325 away fans); Referee: Kevin Wright

24 April 2004 44	Rushden & Diamonds	0–2	Hartlepool United	Irthlingborough
15:00			Williams 56'; Boyd 79'	Stadium: Nene Park; Attendance: 4,568 (1,103 away fans); Referee: Andre Marriner

1 May 2004 45	Hartlepool United	1–3	Plymouth Argyle	Hartlepool
15:00	Boyd 11'		Hodges 12'; Lowndes 42'; Tinkler 48' (o.g.)	Stadium: Victoria Park; Attendance: 7,437 (892 away fans); Referee: Tony Leake

8 May 2004 46	Swindon Town	1–1	Hartlepool United	Swindon
15:00	Igoe 7'		Boyd 71'	Stadium: County Ground; Attendance: 11,627 (1,468 away fans); Referee: Mike Fletcher

==== Play-offs ====
15 May 2004 Semi-final first leg	Hartlepool United	1–1	Bristol City	Hartlepool
15:00	Porter 74'		Rougier 5'	Stadium: Victoria Park; Attendance: 7,211 (668 away fans); Referee: Paul Taylor

19 May 2004 Semi-final second leg	Bristol City	2–1 (3–2 agg.)	Hartlepool United	Bristol
19:45	Goodfellow 88'; Roberts 90'		Sweeney 63'	Stadium: Ashton Gate; Attendance: 18,434 (1,168 away fans); Referee: Graham Poll

=== FA Cup ===
8 November 2003 First round	Hartlepool United	4–0	Whitby Town	Hartlepool
15:00	Gabbiadini 25', 30'; Humphreys 51'; Brackstone 68'	Report		Stadium: Victoria Park; Attendance: 5,294 (688 away fans); Referee: Michael Ryan

7 December 2003 Second round	Burton Albion	0–1	Hartlepool United	Burton
15:00		Report	Porter 70'	Stadium: Eton Park; Attendance: 3,132 (468 away fans); Referee: Phil Crossley

3 January 2004 Third round	Sunderland	1–0	Hartlepool United	Sunderland
15:00	Arca 53'	Report		Stadium: Stadium of Light; Attendance: 40,816 (9,109 away fans); Referee: Graham Barber

=== League Cup ===
13 August 2003 First round	Sheffield Wednesday	2–2 (a.e.t.) (4–5 p)	Hartlepool United	Sheffield
19:45	Lee 50'; Wood 115'	Report	Robinson 56' (pen.); Istead 104'	Stadium: Hillsborough Stadium; Attendance: 13,410 (1,099 away fans); Referee: George Cain
	Penalties
	Quinn (penalty scored); Smith (penalty missed); Kuqi (penalty scored); Cooke (penalty scored); Barry-Murphy (penalty scored)		Robinson (penalty scored); Henderson (penalty scored); Robson (penalty scored); Jordan (penalty scored); Strachan (penalty scored)

23 September 2003 Second round	Hartlepool United	1–2	West Bromwich Albion	Hartlepool
19:45	Robinson 45' (pen.)	Report	Clement 62'; Hulse 81'	Stadium: Victoria Park; Attendance: 5,265 (566 away fans); Referee: Phil Prosser

=== League Trophy ===
14 October 2003 First round	Oldham Athletic	3–3 (5–3 p)	Hartlepool United	Oldham
19:45	Zola 6'; Vernon 22'; Boshell 71'	Report	Williams 12'; Clarke 59', 90'	Stadium: Boundary Park; Attendance: 3,575 (103 away fans); Referee: Fraser Stretton
	Penalties
	Vernon (penalty scored); Boshell (penalty scored); Holden (penalty scored); Hudson (penalty scored); Clegg (penalty scored)		Robinson (penalty missed); Robinson (penalty scored); Tinkler (penalty scored); Boyd (penalty scored)

== Squad statistics ==
=== Appearances and goals ===
No.	Pos	Nat	Player	Total		Division Two		FA Cup		League Cup		Other	
No.	Pos	Nat	Player	Apps	Goals	Apps	Goals	Apps	Goals	Apps	Goals	Apps	Goals
1	GK	(Wales) WAL	Anthony Williams	2	0	1	0	0	0	0	0	1	0
2	DF	(England) ENG	Michael Barron	40	1	32	1	3	0	2	0	3	0
3	DF	(England) ENG	Mark Robinson	5	0	4	0	0	0	0	0	1	0
4	MF	(England) ENG	Mark Tinkler	52	6	44	6	3	0	2	0	3	0
5	DF	(England) ENG	Michael Nelson	48	3	40	3	3	0	2	0	3	0
6	DF	(England) ENG	Chris Westwood	53	0	45	0	3	0	2	0	3	0
7	MF	(England) ENG	Darrell Clarke	40	7	33	5	2	0	2	0	3	2
8	MF	(England) ENG	Ritchie Humphreys	54	4	46	3	3	1	2	0	3	0
9	FW	(Wales) WAL	Eifion Williams	49	14	41	13	3	0	2	0	3	1
10	FW	(England) ENG	Marco Gabbiadini	18	7	15	5	1	2	1	0	1	0
11	FW	(England) ENG	Kevin Henderson	4	0	3	0	0	0	1	0	0	0
11	MF	(England) ENG	Chris Shuker	15	1	14	1	1	0	0	0	0	0
12	MF	(Northern Ireland) NIR	Stephen Carson	3	0	3	0	0	0	0	0	0	0
14	DF	(England) ENG	Paul Arnison	4	0	4	0	0	0	0	0	0	0
14	MF	(Guyana) GUY	Neil Danns	11	1	9	1	0	0	0	0	2	0
15	FW	(England) ENG	Adam Boyd	21	12	18	12	0	0	0	0	3	0
16	FW	(England) ENG	Marcus Richardson	3	0	3	0	0	0	0	0	0	0
16	DF	(Scotland) SCO	Hugh Robertson	20	4	18	4	0	0	0	0	2	0
17	FW	(Wales) WAL	Jermaine Easter	3	0	3	0	0	0	0	0	0	0
18	MF	(England) ENG	Antony Sweeney	13	2	11	1	0	0	0	0	2	1
19	GK	(England) ENG	Jim Provett	52	0	45	0	3	0	2	0	2	0
20	DF	(England) ENG	John Brackstone	7	1	6	0	1	1	0	0	0	0
21	MF	(England) ENG	Steven Istead	34	2	31	1	1	0	2	1	0	0
22	DF	(England) ENG	Matty Robson	26	1	23	1	2	0	1	0	0	0
23	DF	(England) ENG	Paul Robinson	39	9	31	7	3	0	2	2	3	0
24	DF	(Scotland) SCO	Andy Jordan	6	0	5	0	0	0	1	0	0	0
25	MF	(Scotland) SCO	Gavin Strachan	42	5	36	5	3	0	2	0	1	0
27	FW	(England) ENG	David Foley	1	0	1	0	0	0	0	0	0	0
28	MF	(Scotland) SCO	Ryan McCann	5	0	4	0	0	0	1	0	0	0
29	DF	(England) ENG	Darren Craddock	11	0	10	0	1	0	0	0	0	0
31	FW	(England) ENG	Jack Wilkinson	6	2	4	2	2	0	0	0	0	0
32	FW	(Australia) AUS	Joel Porter	31	5	27	3	2	1	0	0	2	1
33	FW	(England) ENG	Danny Byrne	3	0	2	0	1	0	0	0	0	0
33	DF	(Scotland) SCO	Scott Walker	6	0	6	0	0	0	0	0	0	0

=== Goalscorers ===
Rank	Name	Division Two	FA Cup	League Cup	Other	Total
1	Eifion Williams	13	0	0	1	14
2	Adam Boyd	12	0	0	0	12
3	Paul Robinson	7	0	0	2	9
4	Darrell Clarke	5	0	0	2	7
4	Marco Gabbiadini	5	2	0	0	7
5	Mark Tinkler	5	0	0	0	5
6	Ritchie Humphreys	3	1	0	0	4
6	Hugh Robertson	4	0	0	0	4
7	Michael Nelson	3	0	0	0	3
8	Steven Istead	1	0	1	0	2
8	Antony Sweeney	1	0	0	1	2
8	Jack Wilkinson	2	0	0	0	2
9	Michael Barron	1	0	0	0	1
9	John Brackstone	0	1	0	0	1
9	Neil Danns	1	0	0	0	1
9	Matty Robson	1	0	0	0	1
9	Chris Shuker	1	0	0	0	1

=== Clean Sheets ===
Rank	Name	Division Two	FA Cup	League Cup	Other	Total
1	Jim Provett	14	2	0	0	16

=== Penalties ===
Date	Name	Opposition	Scored?
13 August 2003	Paul Robinson	Sheffield Wednesday	✓
25 August 2003	Marco Gabbiadini	Port Vale	✓
30 August 2003	Paul Robinson	Luton Town	✓
12 September 2003	Paul Robinson	Grimsby Town	✓
23 September 2003	Paul Robinson	West Bromwich Albion	✓
15 November 2003	Gavin Strachan	Rushden & Diamonds	✓
29 November 2003	Gavin Strachan	Swindon Town	✓
20 February 2004	Chris Shuker	Blackpool	✗
28 February 2004	Mark Tinkler	Wycombe Wanderers	✓
3 April 2004	Gavin Strachan	Brighton & Hove Albion	✗
6 April 2004	Adam Boyd	Luton Town	✓
