= 2006–07 Hartlepool United F.C. season =

Hartlepool United
2006–07 season
- Owner: IOR
- Chairman: Ken Hodcroft
- Manager: Danny Wilson
- Stadium: Victoria Park
- Football League Two: 2nd (promoted)
- FA Cup: Second round (Eliminated by Macclesfield Town)
- Football League Cup: Second round (Eliminated by Hull City)
- Football League Trophy: Second round (Eliminated by Doncaster Rovers
- Top goalscorer: League: Richie Barker (9); Jon Daly (9); All: Richie Barker (9); Jon Daly (9)
- Highest home attendance: 7,629 (vs Bristol Rovers)
- Lowest home attendance: 1,832 (vs Rotherham United)
- Average home league attendance: 5,087
- Biggest win: 4–1 (vs. Grimsby Town)
- Biggest defeat: 3–0 (vs. Shrewsbury Town)
Home colours	Away colours	Third colours

The 2006–07 season was Hartlepool United's 98th year in existence and their first season in League Two since 2002–03. Along with competing in League Two, the club also participated in the FA Cup, League Cup and League Trophy. The season covers the period from 1 July 2006 to 30 June 2007.

== Players ==
As of End of Season.

=== First-team squad ===
Note: Flags indicate national team as defined under FIFA eligibility rules; some limited exceptions apply. Players may hold more than one non-FIFA nationality.

No.	Pos.	Nation	Player
1	GK	GRE	Dimitrios Konstantopoulos
2	DF	ENG	Michael Barron
3	MF	ENG	Matty Robson
4	MF	ENG	Mark Tinkler
5	DF	ENG	Michael Nelson
6	DF	ENG	Ben Clark
7	MF	ENG	Darrell Clarke
8	DF	ENG	Ritchie Humphreys
9	FW	AUS	Joel Porter
10	FW	ENG	Richie Barker
11	FW	WAL	Eifion Williams
12	MF	ENG	Craig Hignett
15	MF	ENG	Antony Sweeney
16	MF	ENG	Lee Bullock

No.	Pos.	Nation	Player
17	MF	IRL	Willie Boland
18	MF	ENG	Gary Liddle
19	DF	ENG	John Brackstone
20	FW	ENG	James Brown
21	GK	ENG	Jim Provett
22	DF	ENG	Carl Jones
23	DF	ENG	Darren Williams
24	MF	ENG	Ali Gibb
25	FW	ENG	Michael Mackay
26	MF	ENG	Stephen Turnbull
27	MF	ENG	Phil Turnbull
28	FW	ENG	David Foley
29	MF	ENG	Michael Maidens
35	MF	ENG	Andy Monkhouse

== Transfers ==
=== Transfers in ===
Date	Position	Player	From	Fee	Ref
18 August 2006	MF	Willie Boland	Cardiff City	Free	
21 August 2006	MF	Gary Liddle	Middlesbrough	Free	
31 August 2006	MF	Ali Gibb	Bristol Rovers	Free	
3 January 2007	FW	Richie Barker	Mansfield Town	£80,000	
11 January 2007	MF	Andy Monkhouse	Swindon Town	Undisclosed	
8 February 2007	FW	Michael Mackay	Consett	Undisclosed	
22 March 2007	MF	Craig Hignett	Spennymoor Town	Free	

=== Loans in ===
Date	Position	Player	From	End date	Ref
3 November 2006	FW	Darryl Duffy	Hull City	2 January 2007	
23 November 2006	MF	Andy Monkhouse	Swindon Town	3 January 2007	

=== Transfers out ===
Date	Position	Name	To	Fee	Ref
31 May 2006	DF	Darren Craddock	York City	Free	
30 June 2006	MF	Chris Llewellyn	Wrexham	Free	
28 July 2006	FW	Adam Boyd	Luton Town	£500,000	
28 July 2006	MF	Thomas Butler	Swansea City	Undisclosed	
5 January 2007	FW	Jon Daly	Dundee United	Undisclosed	
29 January 2007	MF	Gavin Strachan	Peterborough United	Free	

=== Loans out ===
Date	Position	Player	To	End date	Ref
28 July 2006	MF	Darrell Clarke	Rochdale	1 January 2007	
8 September 2006	DF	Ritchie Humphreys	Port Vale	8 October 2006	
22 November 2006	MF	Stephen Turnbull	Bury	22 January 2007	
1 January 2007	MF	Gavin Strachan	Peterborough United	29 January 2007	
19 January 2007	MF	Michael Maidens	York City	19 February 2007	
22 January 2007	MF	Phil Turnbull	Blyth Spartans	1 June 2007	
1 March 2007	MF	Stephen Turnbull	Rochdale	1 April 2007	
23 March 2007	FW	Michael Proctor	Wrexham	1 June 2007	

== Results ==
=== Pre-season friendlies ===
12 July 2006	Top Oss	1–1	Hartlepool United	Oss
19:00		Report	Bullock	Stadium: Frans Heesen Stadion

14 July 2006	Den Bosch	0–0	Hartlepool United	Den Bosch
19:00		Report		Stadium: De Vliert

18 July 2006	Middlesbrough	3–0	Hartlepool United	Middlesbrough
19:00		Report		Stadium: Riverside Stadium

22 July 2006	Hartlepool United	2–1	Leeds United	Hartlepool
15:00	Brown 13', 55'	Report	Stone 60'	Stadium: Victoria Park; Attendance: 2,912

25 July 2006	Hartlepool United	1–1	Carlisle United	Hartlepool
19:00	Kirkup 25' (o.g.)	Report	Nade 58'	Stadium: Victoria Park; Attendance: 1,115

29 July 2006	Gretna	2–3	Hartlepool United	Gretna
15:00		Report	Brackstone; Proctor	Stadium: Raydale Park

=== League Two ===
==== League table ====
Pos	Team	Pld	W	D	L	GF	GA	GD	Pts	Promotion, qualification or relegation
1	Walsall (C, P)	46	25	14	7	66	34	+32	89	Promotion to Football League One
2	Hartlepool United (P)	46	26	10	10	65	40	+25	88	Promotion to Football League One
3	Swindon Town (P)	46	25	10	11	58	38	+20	85	Promotion to Football League One
4	Milton Keynes Dons	46	25	9	12	76	58	+18	84	Qualification for League Two play-offs
5	Lincoln City	46	21	11	14	70	59	+11	74	Qualification for League Two play-offs

Rules for classification: In the Football League goals scored (GF) takes precedence over goal difference (GD).
(C) Champions; (P) Promoted

==== Results summary ====
Overall								Home						Away					
Pld	W	D	L	GF	GA	GD	Pts	W	D	L	GF	GA	GD	W	D	L	GF	GA	GD
46	26	10	10	65	40	+25	88	14	5	4	34	17	+17	12	5	6	31	23	+8

==== Results by matchday ====
Round	1	2	3	4	5	6	7	8	9	10	11	12	13	14	15	16	17	18	19	20	21	22	23	24	25	26	27	28	29	30	31	32	33	34	35	36	37	38	39	40	41	42	43	44	45	46
Ground	H	A	A	H	A	H	A	H	H	A	A	H	A	H	A	H	H	A	H	A	A	H	A	H	H	A	A	H	A	H	A	H	A	H	A	H	H	A	A	H	A	H	A	H	A	H
Result	L	D	L	D	L	W	D	W	L	W	W	W	L	D	L	D	L	W	W	W	W	W	W	W	W	W	D	W	D	W	W	W	W	W	W	W	D	D	W	W	L	W	W	D	L	L
Position	19	16	19	20	21	16	19	15	18	13	10	7	9	10	11	14	16	13	10	9	7	7	6	5	5	5	5	5	5	4	3	2	2	1	1	1	1	1	1	1	1	1	1	1	2	2

Source: InTheMadCrowd
A = Away; H = Home; W = Win; D = Draw; L = Loss

==== Results ====
5 August 2006 1	Hartlepool United	0–1	Swindon Town	Hartlepool
15:00		Report	Peacock 11'	Stadium: Victoria Park; Attendance: 4,690; Referee: Russell Booth

8 August 2006 2	Macclesfield Town	0–0	Hartlepool United	Macclesfield
19:45		Report		Stadium: Moss Rose; Attendance: 1,843; Referee: Darren Drysdale

12 August 2006 3	Walsall	2–0	Hartlepool United	Walsall
15:00	Keates 18', 29'	Report		Stadium: Bescot Stadium; Attendance: 5,637; Referee: Fred Graham

19 August 2006 4	Hartlepool United	1–1	Torquay United	Hartlepool
15:00	Bullock 81'	Report	Phillips 5'	Stadium: Victoria Park; Attendance: 3,688; Referee: Anthony Taylor

26 August 2006 5	Hereford United	3–1	Hartlepool United	Hereford
15:00	Sills 33'; Purdie 51' (pen.); Williams 73'	Report	Brown 53'	Stadium: Edgar Street; Attendance: 3,156; Referee: Mike Jones

1 September 2006 6	Hartlepool United	2–1	Boston United	Hartlepool
19:45	Sweeney 29'; Daly 71'	Report	N'Guessan 83'	Stadium: Victoria Park; Attendance: 4,054; Referee: Graham Laws

9 September 2006 7	Milton Keynes Dons	0–0	Hartlepool United	Milton Keynes
15:00		Report		Stadium: National Hockey Stadium; Attendance: 3,909; Referee: Phil Dowd

12 September 2006 8	Hartlepool United	2–0	Mansfield Town	Hartlepool
19:45	Porter 77'; Strachan 90'	Report		Stadium: Victoria Park; Attendance: 3,899; Referee: Mark Haywood

16 September 2006 9	Hartlepool United	0–3	Shrewsbury Town	Hartlepool
15:00		Report	Daly 11' (o.g.); Drummond 77'; Symes 81'	Stadium: Victoria Park; Attendance: 4,291; Referee: Andy Hall

23 September 2006 10	Peterborough United	3–5	Hartlepool United	Peterborough
15:00	Butcher 59'; Gain 61'; Holden 70'	Report	Liddle 30', 53'; Daly 32' (pen.), 45'; Robson 84'	Stadium: London Road; Attendance: 3,916; Referee: Phil Crossley

26 September 2006 11	Grimsby Town	1–4	Hartlepool United	Cleethorpes
19:45	Fenton 16'	Report	Daly 45' (pen.), 85'; Liddle 52'; Porter 90'	Stadium: Blundell Park; Attendance: 3,486; Referee: Darren Deadman

30 September 2006 12	Hartlepool United	3–0	Wrexham	Hartlepool
15:00	Daly 20', 22', 68'	Report		Stadium: Victoria Park; Attendance: 4,452; Referee: Gary Sutton

6 October 2006 13	Lincoln City	2–0	Hartlepool United	Lincoln
19:45	Forrester 39'; Hughes 60'	Report		Stadium: Sincil Bank; Attendance: 5,332; Referee: Pat Miller

14 October 2006 14	Hartlepool United	1–1	Stockport County	Hartlepool
15:00	Robson 43'	Report	Griffin 30'	Stadium: Victoria Park; Attendance: 4,372; Referee: Mike Pike

20 October 2006 15	Chester City	2–1	Hartlepool United	Chester
19:45	Westwood 45'; Walters 52'	Report	Porter 9'	Stadium: Saunders Honda Stadium; Attendance: 2,580; Referee: Andy Woolmer

28 October 2006 16	Hartlepool United	0–0	Darlington	Hartlepool
15:00		Report		Stadium: Victoria Park; Attendance: 7,458; Referee: Mark Clattenburg

4 November 2006 17	Hartlepool United	0–1	Barnet	Hartlepool
15:00		Report	Cogan 83'	Stadium: Victoria Park; Attendance: 3,778; Referee: Rob Shoebridge

18 November 2006 18	Accrington Stanley	1–2	Hartlepool United	Accrington
15:00	Todd 38'	Report	Williams 75'; Humphreys 90'	Stadium: Crown Ground; Attendance: 1,787; Referee: Steve Bratt

25 November 2006 19	Hartlepool United	2–0	Wycombe Wanderers	Hartlepool
15:00	Duffy 24', 59'	Report		Stadium: Victoria Park; Attendance: 3,711; Referee: Graham Salisbury

5 December 2006 20	Notts County	0–1	Hartlepool United	Nottingham
19:45		Report	Monkhouse 8'	Stadium: Meadow Lane; Attendance: 3,546; Referee: Keith Hill

9 December 2006 21	Bristol Rovers	0–2	Hartlepool United	Bristol
15:00		Report	Clark 79'; Duffy 90'	Stadium: Memorial Stadium; Attendance: 4,906; Referee: Grant Hegley

15 December 2006 22	Hartlepool United	1–0	Rochdale	Hartlepool
19:45	Duffy 17'	Report		Stadium: Victoria Park; Attendance: 3,659; Referee: Carl Boyeson

23 December 2006 23	Bury	0–1	Hartlepool United	Bury
15:00		Report	Sweeney 46'	Stadium: Gigg Lane; Attendance: 2,839; Referee: Pat Miller

26 December 2006 24	Hartlepool United	2–0	Grimsby Town	Hartlepool
15:00	Daly 52'; Monkhouse 82'	Report		Stadium: Victoria Park; Attendance: 5,290; Referee: Russell Booth

30 December 2006 25	Hartlepool United	1–0	Peterborough United	Hartlepool
15:00	Duffy 90'	Report		Stadium: Victoria Park; Attendance: 4,654; Referee: Tony Bates

1 January 2007 26	Mansfield Town	0–1	Hartlepool United	Mansfield
15:00		Report	Monkhouse 76'	Stadium: Field Mill; Attendance: 3,531; Referee: Ray Lee

6 January 2007 27	Shrewsbury Town	1–1	Hartlepool United	Shrewsbury
15:00	Symes 78'	Report	Brown 35'	Stadium: New Meadow; Attendance: 4,334; Referee: Anthony Taylor

13 January 2007 28	Hartlepool United	1–0	Milton Keynes Dons	Hartlepool
15:00	Sweeney 55'	Report		Stadium: Victoria Park; Attendance: 4,851; Referee: Scott Mathieson

20 January 2007 29	Wrexham	1–1	Hartlepool United	Wrexham
15:00	Llewellyn 64'	Report	Barker 9'	Stadium: Racecourse Ground; Attendance: 3,828; Referee: Graham Salisbury

27 January 2007 30	Hartlepool United	2–0	Bury	Hartlepool
15:00	Brown 33'; Sweeney 57'	Report		Stadium: Victoria Park; Attendance: 4,901; Referee: Darren Drysdale

3 February 2007 31	Swindon Town	0–1	Hartlepool United	Swindon
15:00		Report	Monkhouse 49'	Stadium: County Ground; Attendance: 6,841; Referee: Grant Hegley

10 February 2007 32	Hartlepool United	3–1	Walsall	Hartlepool
15:00	Nelson 52'; Humphreys 88'; Barker 90'	Report	Butler 3'	Stadium: Victoria Park; Attendance: 5,847; Referee: Lee Mason

17 February 2007 33	Torquay United	0–1	Hartlepool United	Torquay
15:00		Report	Williams 7'	Stadium: Plainmoor; Attendance: 2,194; Referee: Andy Penn

20 February 2007 34	Hartlepool United	3–2	Crewe Alexandra	Hartlepool
19:45	Brown 26'; Barker 60'; Morley 88' (o.g.)	Report	Hadfield 65'; Tipton 70'	Stadium: Victoria Park; Attendance: 5,242; Referee: Jonathan Moss

24 February 2007 35	Boston United	0–1	Hartlepool United	Boston
15:00		Report	Humphreys 64'	Stadium: York Street; Attendance: 2,120; Referee: Danny McDermid

3 March 2007 36	Hartlepool United	3–2	Hereford United	Hartlepool
15:00	Clark 32'; Brown 54'; Williams 68'	Report	Thomas 46'; Guinan 56'	Stadium: Victoria Park; Attendance: 5,535; Referee: Mark Haywood

9 March 2007 37	Hartlepool United	1–1	Lincoln City	Hartlepool
19:45	Barker 90' (pen.)	Report	Green 7'	Stadium: Victoria Park; Attendance: 6,903; Referee: David Webb

17 March 2007 38	Stockport County	3–3	Hartlepool United	Stockport
15:00	Le Fondre 24' (pen.); Elding 28'; Dickinson 36'	Report	Monkhouse 38'; Barker 47' (pen.), 65'	Stadium: Edgeley Park; Attendance: 7,860; Referee: Gary Sutton

25 March 2007 39	Darlington	0–3	Hartlepool United	Darlington
15:00		Report	Williams 39', 51'; Monkhouse 80'	Stadium: The Darlington Arena; Attendance: 9,987; Referee: Richard Beeby

30 March 2007 40	Hartlepool United	3–0	Chester City	Hartlepool
19:45	Barker 3'; Monkhouse 26'; Clark 71'	Report		Stadium: Victoria Park; Attendance: 6,059; Referee: Dean Whitestone

7 April 2007 41	Barnet	2–1	Hartlepool United	Barnet
15:00	Birchall 4'; Puncheon 81'	Report	Williams 77'	Stadium: Underhill Stadium; Attendance: 2,906; Referee: Keith Stroud

9 April 2007 42	Hartlepool United	1–0	Accrington Stanley	Hartlepool
15:00	Barker 65' (pen.)	Report		Stadium: Victoria Park; Attendance: 5,867; Referee: Scott Mathieon

14 April 2007 43	Wycombe Wanderers	0–1	Hartlepool United	High Wycombe
15:00		Report	Barker 81'	Stadium: Adams Park; Attendance: 5,540; Referee: Andy D'Urso

20 April 2007 44	Hartlepool United	1–1	Notts County	Hartlepool
19:45	Brown 3'	Report	Parkinson 45'	Stadium: Victoria Park; Attendance: 6,174; Referee: Mike Pike

28 April 2007 45	Rochdale	2–0	Hartlepool United	Rochdale
15:00	Murray 2'; Dagnall 76' (pen.)	Report		Stadium: Spotland; Attendance: 5,846; Referee: Dean Whitestone

5 May 2007 46	Hartlepool United	1–2	Bristol Rovers	Hartlepool
15:00	Porter 32'	Report	Walker 54'; Lambert 86'	Stadium: Victoria Park; Attendance: 7,629; Referee: Neil Swarbrick

=== FA Cup ===
11 November 2006 First round	Rochdale	1–1	Hartlepool United	Rochdale
15:00	Doolan 62'	Report	Brown 41'	Stadium: Spotland; Attendance: 2,098; Referee: Clive Oliver

20 November 2006 Replay	Hartlepool United	0–0 (4–2 p)	Rochdale	Hartlepool
19:45		Report		Stadium: Victoria Park; Attendance: 2,788; Referee: Mike Jones
	Penalties
	Humphreys (penalty scored); Boland (penalty scored); Daly (penalty scored); Clark (penalty scored)		Jones (penalty scored); Barker (penalty missed); Goodall (penalty missed); Warburton (penalty scored)

2 December 2006 Second round	Macclesfield Town	2–1	Hartlepool United	Chesterfield
15:00	McIntyre 45' (pen.); Murphy 52'	Report	Regan 8' (o.g.)	Stadium: Proact Stadium; Attendance: 3,083; Referee: Christopher Sarginson

=== League Cup ===
22 August 2006 First round	Burnley	0–1	Hartlepool United	Burnley
19:45		Report	Porter 78' (pen.)	Stadium: Turf Moor; Attendance: 3,853; Referee: Carl Boyeson

19 September 2006 Second round	Hull City	0–0 (3–2 p)	Hartlepool United	Kingston upon Hull
19:45		Report		Stadium: KC Stadium; Attendance: 6,392; Referee: Paul Mellin
	Penalties
	Parkin (penalty scored); Elliott (penalty missed); Duffy (penalty missed); Fagan (penalty scored); Dawson (penalty scored)		Liddle (penalty missed); Clark (penalty missed); Brackstone (penalty scored); Foley (penalty scored); Brown (penalty missed)

=== Football League Trophy ===
17 October 2006 First round	Hartlepool United	3–1	Rotherham United	Hartlepool
19:45	Bullock 12'; Foley 43'; Humphreys 67'	Report	Facey 28'	Stadium: Victoria Park; Attendance: 1,832; Referee: Eddie Ilderton

31 October 2006 Second round	Hartlepool United	1–3	Doncaster Rovers	Hartlepool
19:45	Liddle 90'	Report	Heffernan 54', 55'; Price 86'	Stadium: Victoria Park; Attendance: 1,853; Referee: Scott Mathieson

== Squad statistics ==
=== Appearances and goals ===
No.	Pos	Nat	Player	Total		League Two		FA Cup		League Cup		Other	
No.	Pos	Nat	Player	Apps	Goals	Apps	Goals	Apps	Goals	Apps	Goals	Apps	Goals
1	GK	(Greece) GRE	Dimitrios Konstantopoulos	51	0	46	0	3	0	2	0	0	0
2	DF	(England) ENG	Michael Barron	31	0	29	0	2	0	0	0	0	0
3	MF	(England) ENG	Matty Robson	27	2	20	2	3	0	2	0	2	0
4	MF	(England) ENG	Mark Tinkler	7	0	6	0	1	0	0	0	0	0
5	DF	(England) ENG	Michael Nelson	49	1	42	1	3	0	2	0	2	0
6	DF	(England) ENG	Ben Clark	46	3	40	3	3	0	1	0	2	0
8	DF	(England) ENG	Ritchie Humphreys	43	4	38	3	3	0	0	0	2	1
9	FW	(Australia) AUS	Joel Porter	26	5	22	4	0	0	2	1	2	0
10	FW	(England) ENG	Richie Barker	18	9	18	9	0	0	0	0	0	0
11	FW	(Wales) WAL	Eifion Williams	45	6	40	6	3	0	1	0	1	0
12	MF	(Scotland) SCO	Gavin Strachan	5	1	4	1	0	0	0	0	1	0
12	MF	(England) ENG	Craig Hignett	2	0	2	0	0	0	0	0	0	0
14	FW	(England) ENG	Michael Proctor	3	0	2	0	0	0	1	0	0	0
15	MF	(England) ENG	Antony Sweeney	38	4	35	4	1	0	2	0	0	0
16	MF	(England) ENG	Lee Bullock	31	2	25	1	2	0	2	0	2	1
17	MF	(Republic of Ireland) IRL	Willie Boland	30	0	27	0	3	0	0	0	0	0
18	MF	(England) ENG	Gary Liddle	47	4	42	3	2	0	2	0	1	1
19	DF	(England) ENG	John Brackstone	12	0	8	0	0	0	2	0	2	0
20	FW	(England) ENG	James Brown	42	7	36	6	2	1	2	0	2	0
21	GK	(England) ENG	Jim Provett	2	0	0	0	0	0	0	0	2	0
23	DF	(England) ENG	Darren Williams	31	0	26	0	2	0	2	0	1	0
24	MF	(England) ENG	Ali Gibb	29	0	25	0	3	0	1	0	0	0
25	FW	(Republic of Ireland) IRL	Jon Daly	25	9	19	9	3	0	1	0	2	0
25	FW	(England) ENG	Michael Mackay	1	0	1	0	0	0	0	0	0	0
27	MF	(England) ENG	Phil Turnbull	1	0	0	0	0	0	0	0	1	0
28	FW	(England) ENG	David Foley	28	1	25	0	0	0	2	0	1	1
29	MF	(England) ENG	Michael Maidens	7	0	4	0	1	0	0	0	2	0
34	FW	(Scotland) SCO	Darryl Duffy	10	5	10	5	0	0	0	0	0	0
35	MF	(England) ENG	Andy Monkhouse	26	7	26	7	0	0	0	0	0	0

=== Goalscorers ===
Rank	Name	League Two	FA Cup	League Cup	Other	Total
1	Richie Barker	9	0	0	0	9
1	Jon Daly	9	0	0	0	9
2	James Brown	6	1	0	0	7
2	Andy Monkhouse	7	0	0	0	7
3	Eifion Williams	6	0	0	0	6
4	Darryl Duffy	5	0	0	0	5
4	Joel Porter	4	0	1	0	5
5	Ritchie Humphreys	3	0	0	1	4
5	Gary Liddle	3	0	0	1	4
5	Antony Sweeney	4	0	0	0	4
6	Ben Clark	3	0	0	0	3
7	Lee Bullock	1	0	0	1	2
7	Matty Robson	2	0	0	0	2
8	David Foley	0	0	0	1	1
8	Michael Nelson	1	0	0	0	1
8	Gavin Strachan	1	0	0	0	1

=== Clean Sheets ===
Rank	Name	League Two	FA Cup	League Cup	Other	Total
1	Dimitrios Konstantopoulos	22	1	2	0	25

=== Penalties ===
Date	Name	Opposition	Scored?
5 August 2006	Joel Porter	Swindon Town	✗
5 August 2006	Ritchie Humphreys	Swindon Town	✗
12 August 2006	Gavin Strachan	Walsall	✗
22 August 2006	Joel Porter	Burnley	✓
9 September 2006	James Brown	Milton Keynes Dons	✗
23 September 2006	Jon Daly	Peterborough United	✓
26 September 2006	Jon Daly	Grimsby Town	✓
9 March 2007	Richie Barker	Lincoln City	✓
17 March 2007	Richie Barker	Stockport County	✓
9 April 2007	Richie Barker	Accrington Stanley	✗
9 April 2007	Richie Barker	Accrington Stanley	✓
28 April 2007	Richie Barker	Rochdale	✗

=== Suspensions ===
Date Incurred	Name	Games Missed	Reason
1 September 2006	John Brackstone	3	(red card) (vs. Boston United)
20 October 2006	Jon Daly	0	(red card) (vs. Chester City)
20 November 2006	Darren Williams	1	Yellow card
25 November 2006	Gary Liddle	1	Yellow card
2 December 2006	Antony Sweeney	1	(red card) (vs. Macclesfield Town)
20 April 2007	Ben Clark	1	(red card) (vs. Notts County)
28 April 2007	Richie Barker	1	(red card) (vs. Rochdale)
28 April 2007	Andy Monkhouse	1	(red card) (vs. Rochdale)
