= Tom Jordan (footballer) =

Scottish footballer

Personal information
- Full name: Thomas Jordan
- Date of birth: 24 May 1981 (age 45)
- Place of birth: Manchester, England
- Position: Centre back

Team information
- Current team: Weston-super-Mare

Youth career
- 2001–2002: Bristol City

Senior career*
Years	Team	Apps	(Gls)
2002–2003	Southend United	1	(0)
2003–2004	Tamworth	19	(0)
2004	→ Forest Green Rovers (loan)	5	(0)
2004–2008	Havant & Waterlooville	142	(17)
2008–2013	Eastleigh	139	(24)
2013–2014	Sutton United	11	(0)
2014–2015	Weston-super-Mare	35	(2)
- * Club domestic league appearances and goals

Thomas Jordan (born 24 May 1981) is a Scottish semi-professional footballer, and captain for Conference South side Weston-super-Mare, where he plays as a centre back.

== Career ==
In December 2007, he stepped down as Havant and Waterlooville's skipper and missed the historic FA Cup 2nd round proper victory over Notts County as Eastleigh, managed since October 2007 by former Hawks manager Ian Baird, made a second approach for him. On 4 December, Hawks' assistant manager Charlie Oatway stated in Portsmouth's evening paper The News that he believed Baird's new club was "tapping up" (making an illegal contact) Jordan, a viewpoint Eastleigh director of football David Malone vigorously denied. Although Jordan played in the ground-breaking 3rd round win against League One leaders Swansea City and the 4th round tie at Liverpool he still wanted a move to Eastleigh and spent the rest of the season on the sidelines, and negotiations between the two clubs broke down.

In the close-season following the 2007–08 campaign, he finally completed the move to Eastleigh. Jordan received the Conference South player of the month in January 2011. In January 2013 he was transfer listed by Eastleigh and he left the club the following month for Conference South rivals Sutton United.

== Family ==
He is the son of the Scottish international footballer Joe Jordan, who was centre-forward for Leeds United during the 1970s, and the brother of Andy Jordan, who made 21 appearances in the Football League.
