= Gavin Strachan =

Scottish footballer

Personal information
- Full name: Gavin David Strachan
- Date of birth: 23 December 1978 (age 47)
- Place of birth: Aberdeen, Scotland
- Height: 1.78 m (5 ft 10 in)
- Position: Midfielder

Team information
- Current team: West Bromwich Albion (first team coach)

Senior career*
Years	Team	Apps	(Gls)
1997–2003	Coventry City	16	(0)
1999	→ Dundee (loan)	6	(0)
2002	→ Motherwell (loan)	0	(0)
2003	Peterborough United	2	(0)
2003	Southend United	7	(0)
2003–2007	Hartlepool United	79	(7)
2005	→ Stockport County (loan)	4	(0)
2007	→ Peterborough United (loan)	2	(0)
2007–2008	Peterborough United	17	(3)
2008–2009	Notts County	25	(1)
2009–2010	Corby Town	13	(2)
2010–2011	Hinckley United	24	(4)
2011	St Neots Town	1	(0)
Total		195	(17)

International career
1998	Scotland U21	8	(0)

Managerial career
- 2014–2015: Ilkeston
- 2015–2018: Doncaster Rovers (assistant manager)
- 2018–2020: Peterborough United (assistant manager)
- 2020–2026: Celtic (first team coach)
- 2026–: West Bromwich Albion (first team coach)
- * Club domestic league appearances and goals

Gavin David Strachan (born 23 December 1978) is a Scottish professional association football coach, and former player and sports journalist. He is currently a first team coach at EFL Championship club West Bromwich Albion, and he was assistant manager at Doncaster Rovers from 2015 to 2018, then Peterborough United until 2020. After Peterborough he spent six years on the coaching staff at Scottish Premiership side Celtic. He is the son of former manager and player Gordon Strachan, and the father of player Luke Strachan.

Spending most of his early years with Coventry City, Strachan has played for ten different senior clubs, and is a self-described journeyman. He was capped eight times for the Scotland U21 national team.

As part of a degree in sports journalism at University of Staffordshire Strachan wrote a blog for BBC News 2008–2009.

== Playing career ==
Strachan was born in Aberdeen. He began his football career at Coventry City where his father, Gordon Strachan, had taken over as player-manager in 1996. He was loaned out to Dundee in 1998, making nine appearances. Back at Coventry he played in sixteen league games, eleven of them as a substitute; he left soon after the senior Strachan stepped down as manager in late 2001. He scored once during his spell at Coventry; scoring a penalty against Preston North End in the League Cup.

In March 2003 Strachan joined Peterborough United, in a loan deal scheduled for the remainder of the season. He joined Southend on a free transfer shortly afterwards however, but was released by the club six weeks later, at the end of 2002/03. He then moved to Hartlepool United on a free transfer. He enjoyed more success here and managed to play regular first team football for three seasons, appearing in seventy-eight matches and scoring seven. During this, the most successful spell of his playing career, Strachan was pencilled into the Scotland international squad, but the call for his first full international cap never came.

During the 2005–06 season, Strachan missed a large amount of the season after fracturing a foot against Blackpool. Despite the injury, he managed to complete the match. After recovering, he was loaned out to Stockport County in his third season at Hartlepool.

In the 2006–07 season, Strachan saw limited selection by new Pools boss Danny Wilson after the signings of Gary Liddle and Willie Boland. He consequently signed for Peterborough United initially on loan in January 2007, before making the move permanent just two days before the close of the January transfer window.

Strachan signed for Notts County on 10 January 2008 after his release from Peterborough United. He scored his first goal for the club in a 2–1 victory against Exeter City on 10 January 2009.

On 30 April 2009, Notts County announced that five players would be released from the club at the end of the season, Strachan being among them. He subsequently joined Corby Town F.C. on 24 July 2009.

In June 2010, Strachan signed a one-year deal with Hinckley United Strachan joined United Counties League side St Neots Town in March 2011 scoring on his debut in the UCL cup. St Neots were later investigated as Strachan's registration papers had been delayed.

== Coaching career ==
In July 2011, Strachan returned to Peterborough United as youth team coach, replacing David Oldfield who departed to take up a similar role with West Bromwich Albion. Strachan was subsequently promoted to a first team coach position with Peterborough.

In June 2015, Strachan was appointed the new manager of Ilkeston, his first managerial job, after Kevin Wilson left the club to manage National League North side Nuneaton Town.

On 16 October 2015, Strachan became assistant manager to Darren Ferguson at Doncaster Rovers.

On 26 January 2019, Strachan became assistant manager to Darren Ferguson at Peterborough United after the dismissal of Steve Evans and Paul Raynor.

On 22 June 2020 Strachan became the first team coach at Scottish Premiership club Celtic. Strachan had to manage the first team for two games due to an outbreak of COVID-19 throughout the Celtic squad in January 2021.

In June 2026, he joined EFL Championship side West Bromwich Albion as part of James Morrison's backroom staff.

== International career ==
Strachan received eight caps for the Scotland U21 national team, though he had no appearances for the senior team. His first call-up was in a friendly against Denmark in March 1998.

== Media ==
In September 2008, Strachan began writing a blog for the BBC News site to help his degree in Professional Sports Writing and Broadcasting at University of Staffordshire.

== Career statistics ==
Appearances and goals by club, season and competition
Club	Season	League			FA Cup		League Cup		Other		Total	
Club	Season	Division	Apps	Goals	Apps	Goals	Apps	Goals	Apps	Goals	Apps	Goals
Coventry City	1997–98	Premier League	9	0	4	0	0	0	0	0	13	0
Coventry City	1998–99	Premier League	0	0	0	0	1	0	0	0	1	0
Coventry City	1999–00	Premier League	3	0	0	0	1	0	0	0	4	0
Coventry City	2000–01	Premier League	1	0	0	0	2	1	0	0	3	1
Coventry City	2001–02	Division One	1	0	0	0	0	0	0	0	1	0
Coventry City	2002–03	Division One	1	0	0	0	0	0	0	0	1	0
Coventry City	Total		15	0	4	0	4	1	0	0	23	1
Dundee (loan)	1998–99	Scottish Premiership	6	0	0	0	0	0	0	0	6	0
Peterborough United (loan)	2002–03	Division Two	2	0	0	0	0	0	0	0	2	0
Southend United	2002–03	Division Three	7	0	0	0	0	0	0	0	7	0
Hartlepool United	2003–04	Division Two	36	5	3	0	2	0	1	0	42	5
Hartlepool United	2004–05	League One	30	1	2	0	2	0	4	1	38	2
Hartlepool United	2005–06	League One	9	1	0	0	1	0	0	0	10	1
Hartlepool United	2006–07	League Two	4	0	0	0	0	0	1	0	5	0
Hartlepool United	Total		79	7	5	0	5	0	6	1	95	8
Stockport County (loan)	2005–06	League Two	4	0	0	0	0	0	0	0	4	0
Peterborough United	2006–07	League Two	16	2	2	0	0	0	0	0	18	2
Peterborough United	2007–08	League Two	3	0	0	0	1	0	2	0	6	0
Peterborough United	Total		19	2	2	0	1	0	2	0	24	2
Notts County	2007–08	League Two	7	0	0	0	0	0	0	0	7	0
Notts County	2008–09	League Two	18	1	1	0	0	0	0	0	19	1
Notts County	Total		25	1	1	0	0	0	0	0	26	1
Career total			157	10	12	0	10	1	8	1	187	12
