= John Brackstone =

English footballer (born 1985)

Personal information
- Full name: John Brackstone
- Date of birth: 9 February 1985 (age 41)
- Place of birth: Hartlepool, England
- Height: 5 ft 11 in (1.80 m)
- Position: Left back

Youth career
- Hartlepool United

Senior career*
Years	Team	Apps	(Gls)
2003–2007	Hartlepool United	25	(0)
2007–2008	Darlington	3	(0)
2008–2009	Gateshead	15	(1)
2009–2010	Blyth Spartans		
2010–2012	Bedlington Terriers		
2012–201?	Shildon		
2015–2016	→ West Auckland Town (loan)		
- * Club domestic league appearances and goals

John Brackstone (born 9 February 1985) is an English former footballer who played as a left back. He played in the Football League for Hartlepool United and Darlington, and in non-league football for clubs including Gateshead, Blyth Spartans, Bedlington Terriers, Shildon and West Auckland Town.

== Playing career ==
Brackstone began his career in Hartlepool United's youth development programme. He moved on to the reserves, but his progress was temporarily halted when he broke his leg during the 2002–03 season.

By October 2003, he had recovered well enough for manager Neale Cooper to give him a first-team debut, as a half-time substitute away to Blackpool in the Second Division. Cooper said afterwards that Brackstone was one of only two players to "come out of [the 4–0 defeat] with any credit", and his performance earned him a first start three days later against Chesterfield. On his fifth appearance, against Whitby Town in the FA Cup, he scored his first senior goal from a free kick, but the run of games was ended by a groin problem, followed by a bout of pleurisy, and he played just twice more that season. In March 2004, he signed his first professional contract. He was a member of the Hartlepool United youth squad that took part in the 2004 Dallas Cup, and converted a penalty to open the scoring in the under-19 final, in which they beat New York/New Jersey MetroStars U19 4–1.

Described by his club profile as "an aggressive and tough-tackling defender, [who] also possesses a lot of skill and [whose] sweet left-foot means he is a threat from set-pieces", Brackstone came into the side for a run of six games in February and March 2005, but his season was ended prematurely by an attack of glandular fever. He played little in the 2005–06 season as the team were relegated to League Two. He signed a contract extension and, under the management of Danny Wilson, began the 2006–07 season as starting left back. In mid-November, he underwent surgery on a double hernia; he regained fitness but not his place in the team, and was released at the end of the season.

Brackstone moved on to League Two club Darlington, where manager, Dave Penney saw him as competition for established left back Tim Ryan. He played little: apart from four games in November between Ryan's hamstring injury and the arrival of loanee Lee Ridley he made just two appearances, and was released at the end of the season.

Brackstone signed for Conference North club Gateshead, but failed to establish himself in the side, was transfer-listed in November, and transferred to local rivals Blyth Spartans in February 2009 for a £3,000 fee. By the end of the 2009–10 season, he had made 50 appearances, mostly in the starting eleven. He then moved into Northern League football, first with Bedlington Terriers, where he spent two years before joining Shildon. In November 2015, he joined West Auckland Town on a short-term loan.

== Personal life ==
Brackstone was born in 1985 in Hartlepool, County Durham, where he attended Henry Smith School. His older brother, Stephen, also went on to play professional football. Brackstone grew up as a Hartlepool United supporter.

While playing football part-time, Brackstone spent time as a coach with a Teesside- and County Durham-based group of children's coaching academies.

In October 2019, Brackstone played alongside his former Hartlepool teammates in a Legends v Fan Match. The 2004–05 side he played in is seen as one of the club's greatest sides. The Legends won 19–0 and Brackstone managed to get on the scoresheet.

== Career statistics ==
Appearances and goals by club, season and competition
Club	Season	League			FA Cup		League Cup (Note: Includes Football League Cup, Conference League Cup)		Other		Total	
Club	Season	Division	Apps	Goals	Apps	Goals	Apps	Goals	Apps	Goals	Apps	Goals
Hartlepool United	2003–04	Second Division	6	0	1	1	0	0	0	0	7	1
Hartlepool United	2004–05	League One	9	0	1	0	0	0	2 (Note: Appearance(s) in Football League Trophy)	0	12	0
Hartlepool United	2005–06	League One	2	0	1	0	0	0	1	0	4	0
Hartlepool United	2006–07	League Two	8	0	0	0	2	0	2	0	12	0
Hartlepool United	Total		25	0	3	1	2	0	5	0	35	1
Darlington	2007–08	League Two	3	0	2	0	1	0	0	0	6	0
Gateshead	2008–09	Conference North	15	1	3	0	1	0	0	0	19	1
Career total			43	1	8	1	4	0	5	0	60	2

== Honours ==
=== Club ===
Hartlepool United

- Dallas Cup U19: 2004
- Football League Two runners-up: 2006–07
