= Matty Robson =

English footballer

Personal information
- Full name: Matthew James Robson
- Date of birth: 23 January 1985 (age 41)
- Place of birth: Coxhoe, England
- Positions: Left back; winger

Senior career*
Years	Team	Apps	(Gls)
2002–2009	Hartlepool United	138	(9)
2009–2015	Carlisle United	172	(20)
2015	→ Gateshead (loan)	3	(0)
2015–2021	Shildon	247	(38)
Total		560	(67)
- * Club domestic league appearances and goals as of 11:37, 15 July 2021 (UTC)

Matthew James Robson (born 23 January 1985) is a former professional footballer who played as a left winger or left back for Hartlepool United, Carlisle United and Shildon.

== Biography ==
=== Hartlepool United ===
Robson came through Hartlepool's youth development programme, following in the footsteps of Antony Sweeney, Jim Provett and Adam Boyd. While playing for the youth team, Robson gained the reputation of being a quick and pacey winger with a keen eye for set pieces. He won Hartlepool's Young Player of the Year Award for 2002–03. For the 2003–04 season, manager Neale Cooper promoted him to the first team in order to fill the team's "problem position" of left back.

Robson scored on his debut in Hartlepool's first match of the 2003–04 Second Division campaign, in a 4–3 win against Peterborough United. During that season he went on to make 26 league and cup appearances. The following season saw him make even more appearances, participating in 34 league and cup matches and scoring 3 goals. These appearances included the League One play-off final against Sheffield Wednesday, which Hartlepool lost.

Hartlepool were relegated from League One in the following season (2005–06) but won promotion back to League One at the first time of asking, with Robson making 20 league appearances and scoring twice. He later lost his place in the side to Andy Monkhouse and only made 17 league appearances in the 2007–08 season, 11 of which were as a substitute.

=== Carlisle United ===
Robson signed for fellow League One club Carlisle United at the end of the 2008–09 season, after rejecting a new contract from Hartlepool. He played at Wembley in his first season for the Cumbrians in the 2010 Football League Trophy final only to lose 4–1 to Southampton

However, Carlisle, with Robson featuring in defence, were successful at Wembley the next season winning the 2011 Football League Trophy final 1–0 against Brentford

Due to a formation change from manager Greg Abbott, Robson struggled to hold down a 1st team place throughout the 2010–2011 season, after his strong performances in the 2009–10 season.

A firm fans' favourite, Robson won Carlisle's 2012–13 player of the year award and signed a new contract to keep him with the club until 2015. In 2013–14, he made 39 appearances in all competitions as Carlisle were relegated to League Two. He missed two months of the season, from February to April 2014, with a back injury.

During his time with Carlisle, Robson ended up scoring against his former club Hartlepool three times. While this would cause a negative reception from Hartlepool fans, Robson did receive a good reception from Pools fans along with his former Hartlepool teammate Antony Sweeney when the two clubs played each other on the final day of the 2014–15 season.

=== Shildon ===
On 4 May 2015, Robson was released by Carlisle after he'd been on loan at Gateshead. Robson signed for Northern League side Shildon following his release from Carlisle.

Robson took up a player-coach role with Shildon in October 2019.

== Honours ==
Hartlepool United

- Football League Two runner-up: 2006–07

Carlisle United

- Football League Trophy: 2010–11; runner-up: 2009–10

Individual

- Hartlepool United Young Player of the Year: 2002–03
- Carlisle United Player of the Year: 2012–13
