= Dimitrios Konstantopoulos =

Greek coach and retired association football player (born 1978)

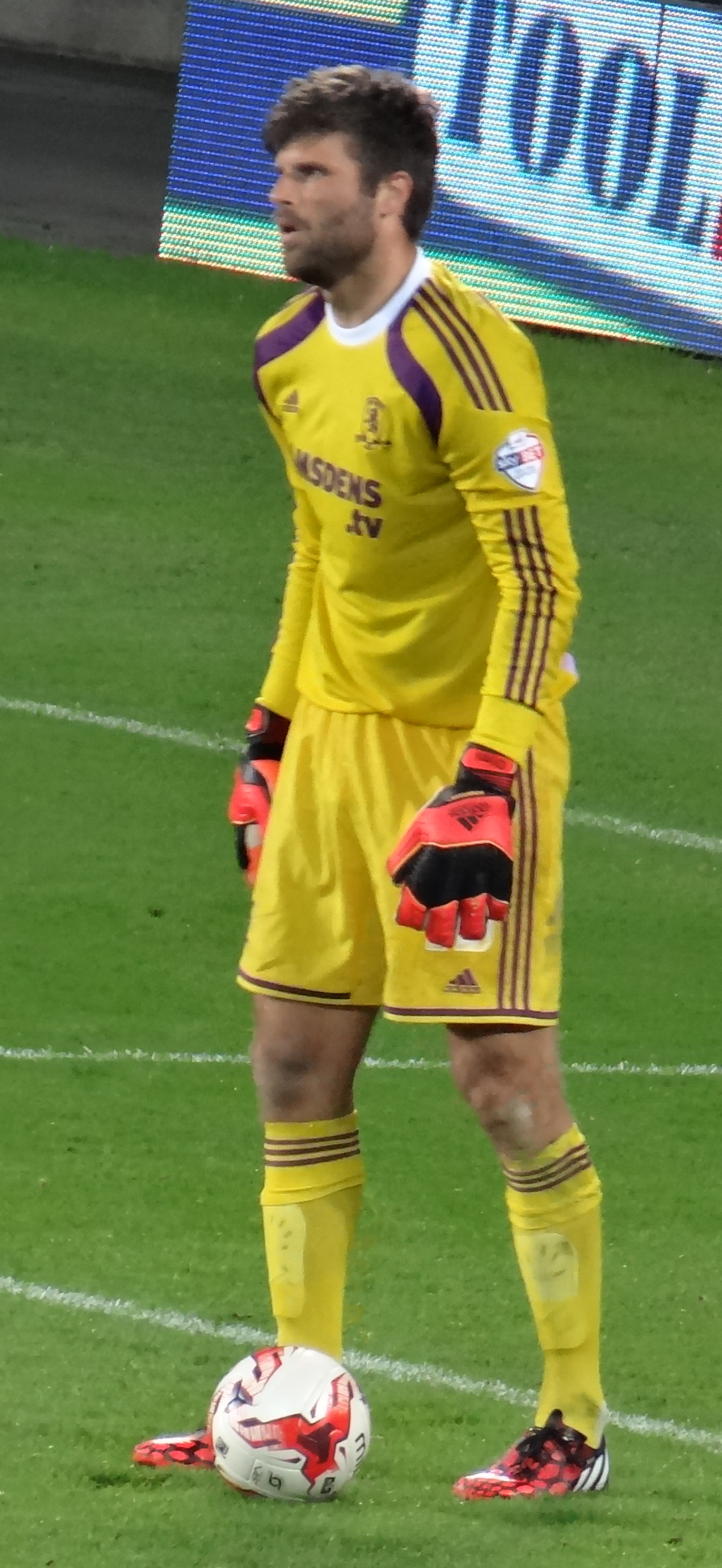
- Konstantopoulos playing for Middlesbrough in 2014

Personal information
- Full name: Dimitrios Konstantopoulos
- Date of birth: 29 November 1978 (age 47)
- Place of birth: Thessaloniki, Greece
- Height: 1.93 m (6 ft 4 in)
- Position: Goalkeeper

Youth career
- 1994–1996: Megas Alexandros Thessaloniki
- 1996: Ampelokipi

Senior career*
Years	Team	Apps	(Gls)
1996–2000	Kalamata	7	(0)
2000–2001	Egaleo	3	(0)
2001–2002	Kalamata	5	(0)
2002–2003	Farense	0	(0)
2003–2007	Hartlepool United	117	(0)
2007–2010	Coventry City	24	(0)
2008	→ Nottingham Forest (loan)	0	(0)
2008–2009	→ Swansea City (loan)	4	(0)
2009	→ Cardiff City (loan)	6	(0)
2010–2011	Kerkyra	30	(0)
2011–2013	AEK Athens	39	(0)
2013–2019	Middlesbrough	98	(0)
2019–2020	Hartlepool United	0	(0)
2020–2021	Thornaby	0	(0)
Total		333	(0)

International career
1998–1999	Greece U21	9	(0)
2011	Greece	1	(0)

Managerial career
- 2025: Iraklis (assistant manager)
- 2025–2026: Asteras Tripolis (assistant manager)
- * Club domestic league appearances and goals as of November 4, 2025

Dimitrios Konstantopoulos (Greek: Δημήτριος Κωνσταντόπουλος; born 29 November 1978) is a Greek former professional footballer who played as a goalkeeper.

After playing amateur football with Ampelokipi, Konstantopoulos signed his first professional contract with Kalamata in 1996, where he made 12 appearances in six years for the club, with a spell at Egaleo yielding three further appearances between 2001 and 2002. He moved to Portuguese side Farense after this, before joining Hartlepool United in October 2003. After making 117 league appearances for Hartlepool, Konstantopoulos opted to switch to Coventry City in 2007. However, he was unable to hold down a first team place, and, after loan spells with Nottingham Forest, Swansea City (twice) and Cardiff City between 2008 and 2009, Konstantopoulos was released in 2010 having made 31 league appearances for Coventry. He returned to Greece, spending a successful season with Kerkyra before switching to AEK Athens for the next two seasons. Following AEK's relegation, he was released at the end of his contract, and joined Middlesbrough in August 2013.

Internationally, Konstantopoulos made nine appearances for Greek U21, and made his full international debut for Greece in 2011; his only senior cap.

== Club career ==
=== Early career ===
Konstantopoulos began his professional career with Kalamata in 1996, having previously been playing amateur football for Ampelokipi that year. After making seven appearances in four seasons, he spent just over a season with Egaleo from 2001 to 2001, where he made three appearances. He then returned to Kalamata, and made another five appearances the following season. Prior to moving to England, he had been playing in Portugal for SC Farense.

=== Hartlepool United ===
Konstantopoulos was given a trial at Hartlepool United in 2003 by the then-manager Neale Cooper. He signed a permanent contract in October 2003.

Konstantopoulos spent the majority of his first season playing for Hartlepool's reserve team and as a substitute. In the following 2004–05 season, Konstantopoulos finally made his début in the 2–1 League Cup win over Macclesfield Town on 24 August 2004. Konstantopoulos then made his league début in the 2–1 win against Colchester United six days later. Although still second-choice to Jim Provett at that point, he would become number one from the end of October, going on to make a total of 37 appearances that year. He was part of the Hartlepool United side that reached the fourth round of the FA Cup in 2005, and he kept 25 clean sheets during Hartlepool's 2005–06 campaign.

=== Coventry City ===
Konstantopoulos signed for Coventry City on 30 June 2007, after he rejected a new contract offer from Hartlepool. He made his debut in Coventry's first match of the season, which was a 4–1 victory over Barnsley. Although a regular starter for Coventry for the first half of the season, the arrival of Kasper Schmeichel pushed him to third choice (behind Andy Marshall), and Konstantopoulos made his 23rd, and last, appearance of the season on 9 February 2008, in a 1–0 defeat to Millwall.

==== Loan to Nottingham Forest ====
On 24 March 2008 Konstantopoulos signed for Nottingham Forest on loan until the end of the 2007–08 season. He then ruptured his Achilles tendon on his first day of training at The City Ground.

==== Loan to Swansea City ====
On 24 October 2008, Konstantopoulos signed for Swansea City on a one-month emergency loan deal, after Swansea's first choice keeper Dorus de Vries suffered a double fracture to his jaw against Queens Park Rangers. He made his Swansea début against Doncaster Rovers on 1 November, saving a penalty late in the match. He extended his loan spell by a month later in November, having made two further appearances. His form for Swansea led to manager Roberto Martinez stating that he wished to keep Konstantopoulos permanently in December. After one further appearance, he briefly returned to Coventry on 2 January 2009 after being recalled due to Coventry's injury problems, before rejoining Swansea on loan four days later until the end of the month. Although Coventry and Swansea agreed a deal that would see Konstantopoulos remain in Wales until the end of the season, issues with the paperwork meant that the Football League refused to allow the extension. He thus returned to Coventry having made five appearances for Swansea in total.

==== Loan to Cardiff City ====
Three days after returning to Coventry, Konstantopoulos was again loaned out, this time to Swansea's local rivals Cardiff City until the end of the season as cover for Finland international Peter Enckelman who was ruled out for up to two months after undergoing knee surgery. With second choice goalkeeper Tom Heaton also being ruled out through injury, Konstantopoulos was handed his debut on 22 February against Wolverhampton Wanderers, a match which ended in a 2–2 draw after Konstantopoulos scored an own goal after dropping a cross from Wolves midfielder Kyel Reid into his own net. Konstantopoulos remained in goal for the following games, but made another error in a 2–0 defeat to Norwich City, when he failed to clear a long pass and was tackled by Dave Mooney to concede the first goal of the game. After Konstantopoulos suffered a foot injury in March, Cardiff manager Dave Jones signed Stuart Taylor on loan from Aston Villa; although Konstantopoulos remained with Cardiff for the rest of the season, he did not play again for the club, and he returned to Coventry at the end of the season having made a total of six appearances.

==== Return to Coventry City ====
Konstantopoulos remained with Coventry City for the start of the 2009–10 season, and made his first appearance in a year for the club in the 1–0 League Cup defeat to Hartlepool on 12 August 2009. Following an injury to first choice goalkeeper Keiren Westwood during a match against West Brom on 24 October, Konstantopoulos was brought on as a substitute and helped the club to their first clean sheet in eleven games. Although stating an intention to fight for a first team place, he made just two more appearances before Westwood returned to the team on 21 November. His next appearance came in a 1–1 draw with Portsmouth in the FA Cup on 2 January 2010; although he drew praise from BBC Sport for his performance in this match, it would also prove to be his last game for Coventry. He was released at the end of the season after his contract expired, having made 27 appearances for the club.

=== Kerkyra ===
After seven years abroad, Konstantopoulos returned to the Greek Super League with Kerkyra. He made his début in Kerkyra's opening game of the season, which was a 2–1 victory against AEK Athens at the Panpeloponnesian Stadium on 29 August. His good form resulted in him being called up to the Greece national football team by coach Fernando Santos, and Konstantopoulos made his senior international début in the 3–1 win against Malta in June 2011. He finished the season having made 30 appearances for Kerkyra.

=== AEK Athens ===
On 13 July 2011, Konstantopoulos signed a two-year deal with AEK Athens. He suffered a spinal cord injury in a Europa League match against FC Dinamo Tbilisi on 25 August; although able to play in AEK's next Europa League match on 15 September, which was against RSC Anderlecht, he was forced to undergo surgery two weeks later. Konstantopoulos started the season as second-choice behind Giannis Arabatzis in the Super League, but became number one in March. He spent the 2012–13 season as AEK's primary goalkeeper, but after making 24 appearances that season, and 39 league appearances in total, he was released following AEK's relegation.

=== Middlesbrough ===
==== 2013–14 season ====
On 16 August 2013, Konstantopoulos signed a short-term deal with Middlesbrough until January 2014, which was later extended to the end of the season. He had to wait for January's FA Cup defeat to Hull City on 4 January 2014 to make his debut, with Shay Given having joined on loan when first-choice Jason Steele injured his ankle, conceding two goals in the process. He then made his full league debut against Ipswich Town on 8 March 2014 in a 2–0 victory. After Given returned to Aston Villa, Aitor Karanka opted to use Konstantopoulos as his number one goalkeeper, ahead of Steele and Tomas Mejias, and Middlesbrough opened contract talks with Konstantopoulos in April 2014. On 1 May 2014, Konstantopoulos signed a new one-year contract with Middlesbrough after making 13 appearances.

==== 2014–15 season ====
He remained number one for the 2014–15 season, and was described by Sky Sports as being "instrumental" to Middlesbrough's form at the end of 2014.

On 19 January 2015 Middlesbrough head coach Aitor Karanka claimed that Konstantopoulos was the "perfect" squad member after the 2–0 win against Huddersfield Town, after conceding 12 goals in 23 matches and keeping 13 clean sheets. Middlesbrough had let in 17 goals in 26 matches; the fewest in the Championship. Konstantopoulos extended his contract with Middlesbrough in February 2015, although the terms were undisclosed. He emerged as Middlesbrough's first-choice keeper for 2014/15, despite the permanent arrival of Mejias from Real Madrid.

On 8 May 2015 in the Championship play-offs, Middlesbrough played Brentford and came away with a 2–1 win, with Fernando Amorebieta scoring in injury time. They came away with a win and a one-goal advantage. Alan Judge's booming shot hit the cross-bar out of nowhere, and replays confirmed Konstantopoulos' fingertips stopped the ball from going in. On 25 May 2015, Konstantopoulos played in the 2015 Championship play-off final, where Norwich City claimed an instant return to the Premier League as they recorded a 2–0 play-off final victory against Middlesbrough at Wembley.

==== 2015–16 season ====
On 17 December 2015, Middlesbrough head coach Aitor Karanka said that Konstantopoulos played a big part of that solidity and the first place of the club so far in the Championship, and with the keeper having made 20 league appearances this season, he activated a clause in his contract to stay on Teesside for another year. In 24 league matches this season he kept 15 clean sheets, including eight in a row. He was part of the record-breaking Boro rearguard who racked up nine consecutive league clean sheets, smashing a 30-year club milestone. On 29 April 2016, in a 2–2 away game against Birmingham reached 100 appearances with the jersey of Middlesbrough. On 7 May 2016, in the very last matchday following their 1–1 draw with rivals Brighton he celebrated with the club, after seven long years in the Championship, the return to England's top flight. Furthermore, he kept 22 clean sheets in this season setting a new record for the club.

==== 2016–17 season ====
Following promotion to the Premier League, Konstantopoulos' future at Middlesbrough remained uncertain; with the signings of Victor Valdés and Brad Guzan, this took him down to third-choice goalkeeper. However, most journalists stated that Konstantopoulos should be given a chance in top flight football, despite his advancing age and the fact he has no Premier League experience. On 28 January 2017, Konstantopoulos made his first appearance of the season, keeping goal behind a strong line up in a 1–0 FA Cup fourth round win against Accrington Stanley F.C.

==== 2017–18 season ====
Despite reports in the off-season stating that Konstantopoulos had been released by Middlesbrough after four years and claims that he would retire, on 22 June 2017, he signed a one-year contract extension. With the signing of Darren Randolph, Konstantopoulos remained second-choice goalkeeper, and did not make a single appearance during the league campaign.

==== 2018–19 season ====
New manager Tony Pulis decided that Konstantopoulos was worthy of signing a new contract, and did so, signing another one-year contract extension. On 5 January 2019, Konstantopoulos became the oldest ever to play for the club in a 5–0 win FA Cup match against Peterborough United He was released by Middlesbrough at the end of the 2018–19 season.

=== Second spell in Hartlepool United ===
On 2 December 2019, after six months without a club, he re-joined National League club Hartlepool until the end of the season. The 41-year-old shot stopper had been training with Pools for the majority of the season following his release from Boro. Dimi made one appearance for Pools, in the FA Trophy, and became the oldest player to ever play for the club at 41 years and 15 days old.

=== Thornaby ===
On 25 August 2020, Konstantopoulos signed for Northern Football League side Thornaby for the 2020–21 season.

== International career ==
On 17 November 2010, Konstantopoulos was called up to the Greece national football team for the first time, for a match against Austria. On 6 April 2011, he made his only appearance for the national team against Malta in a UEFA Euro 2012 qualifier.

== Coaching career ==
In August 2021, it was announced that Konstantopoulos would become Hartlepool United's goalkeeper coach following the departure of Ross Turnbull. Dimi left the club on 8 June 2022.

In June 2022, Konstantopoulos took up the role of goalkeeper coach at Panetolikos and later had a spell as assistant manager. However, in June 2023, it was announced that Dimi had moved back to the UK and had taken up the dual role of first team and goalkeeper coach at Ayr United.

From June to September 2025 he was an assistant coach at Iraklis and from September 2025 until January 2026 was the assistant coach of Super League club Asteras Tripolis.

== Personal life ==
In 2016, Dimi opened a Greek restaurant in Middlesbrough called Great Greek Modern Restaurant.

== Career statistics ==
Club	Season	League			Cup		League Cup		Other		Total	
Club	Season	Division	Apps	Goals	Apps	Goals	Apps	Goals	Apps	Goals	Apps	Goals
Kalamata	1996–97	Alpha Ethniki	1	0	0	0	0	0	0	0	1	0
Kalamata	1997–98	Alpha Ethniki	4	0	0	0	0	0	0	0	4	0
Kalamata	1998–99	Beta Ethniki	0	0	0	0	0	0	0	0	0	0
Kalamata	1999–2000	Alpha Ethniki	2	0	0	0	0	0	0	0	2	0
Kalamata	Total		7	0	0	0	0	0	0	0	7	0
Egaleo	2000–01	Beta Ethniki	3	0	0	0	0	0	0	0	3	0
Kalamata	2001–02	Beta Ethniki	5	0	0	0	0	0	0	0	5	0
Farense	2002–03	Segunda Liga	0	0	0	0	0	0	0	0	0	0
Hartlepool United	2003–04	Second Division	0	0	0	0	0	0	0	0	0	0
Hartlepool United	2004–05	League One	25	0	5	0	1	0	6	0	37	0
Hartlepool United	2005–06	League One	46	0	2	0	2	0	1	0	51	0
Hartlepool United	2006–07	League Two	46	0	3	0	2	0	0	0	51	0
Hartlepool United	Total		117	0	10	0	5	0	7	0	139	0
Coventry City	2007–08	Championship	21	0	2	0	0	0	0	0	23	0
Coventry City	2008–09	Championship	0	0	0	0	0	0	0	0	0	0
Coventry City	2009–10	Championship	3	0	1	0	1	0	0	0	5	0
Coventry City	Total		24	0	3	0	1	0	0	0	28	0
Swansea City (loan)	2008–09	Championship	4	0	1	0	1	0	0	0	6	0
Cardiff City (loan)	2008–09	Championship	6	0	0	0	0	0	0	0	6	0
Kerkyra	2010–11	Super League Greece	30	0	1	0	0	0	0	0	31	0
AEK Athens	2011–12	Super League Greece	15	0	0	0	0	0	5	0	20	0
AEK Athens	2012–13	Super League Greece	24	0	0	0	0	0	0	0	24	0
AEK Athens	Total		39	0	0	0	0	0	5	0	44	0
Middlesbrough	2013–14	Championship	12	0	1	0	0	0	0	0	13	0
Middlesbrough	2014–15	Championship	40	0	0	0	2	0	3	0	45	0
Middlesbrough	2015–16	Championship	46	0	0	0	0	0	0	0	46	0
Middlesbrough	2016–17	Premier League	0	0	1	0	0	0	0	0	1	0
Middlesbrough	2017–18	Championship	0	0	0	0	3	0	0	0	3	0
Middlesbrough	2018–19	Championship	0	0	2	0	2	0	0	0	4	0
Middlesbrough	Total		98	0	4	0	7	0	3	0	112	0
Hartlepool United	2019–20	National League	0	0	0	0	0	0	1	0	1	0
Career total			333	0	19	0	14	0	16	0	382	0

== Honours ==
=== Hartlepool United ===
- Football League Two runners-up: 2006–07

=== Middlesbrough ===
- Championship runners-up: 2015–16
