= Dyke House Academy =

Location
- Mapleton Road; Hartlepool; County Durham, TS24 8NQ; England
- Coordinates: 54.69615°N 1.21805°W

Information
- Type: Academy
- Local authority: Hartlepool Borough Council
- Trust: Northern Education Trust
- Department for Education URN: 139405 Tables
- Ofsted: Reports
- Executive Principal: Adam Palmer
- Principal: Dean Cope
- Gender: Coeducational
- Age: 11 to 18
- Enrolment: 1247
- Capacity: 1288
- Website: dha.northerneducationtrust.org

Dyke House Academy (formerly Dyke House Secondary Modern School, Dyke House Comprehensive School and then Dyke House Sports and Technology College) is a coeducational secondary school and sixth form located in Hartlepool, County Durham, England.

== School history ==
The school was previously a secondary modern school, opened in 1939. A film was made of activities at the school in 1950.

In 1993, the school was the second nationally following the introduction of Ofsted to be judged to be "causing concern". The then headteacher and staff noted in response the high level of deprivation in the area from which the school's pupils come, and the high level of special educational needs among the school's children. Local authority funding had been reduced.

In 2008, the school was mentioned in the House of Commons as one of a number of schools which had not entered any children for a GCSE in a modern foreign language in the last three years.

Previously a foundation school administered by Hartlepool Borough Council, Dyke House Sports and Technology College converted to academy status in May 2013. The school is now part of the Northern Education Trust but continues to coordinate with Hartlepool Borough Council for admissions. The school was later renamed Dyke House Academy.

As of 2020, the school's most recent full inspection was in 2015, with a judgement of Good. There was a short inspection in 2019, which made no change to the judgement of Good.

In 2019, the school's Progress 8 measure at GCSE was average. The proportion of children achieving Grade 5 or above in English and maths GCSEs was above the average for Hartlepool. Absence and persistent absence were high.

Progress at A-level in 2019 was above average.

== Academics ==
Dyke House Academy offers GCSEs and BTECs as programmes of study for pupils. The school also has specialisms in sports and technology.

== Notable former pupils ==
- Harry Chapman, professional footballer

== Notable staff ==
- Stephanie Aird, teacher at the school who left to pursue a career in comedy
- Eifion Williams, former professional footballer
