= Mark Robinson (footballer, born 1981) =

English footballer (born 1981)

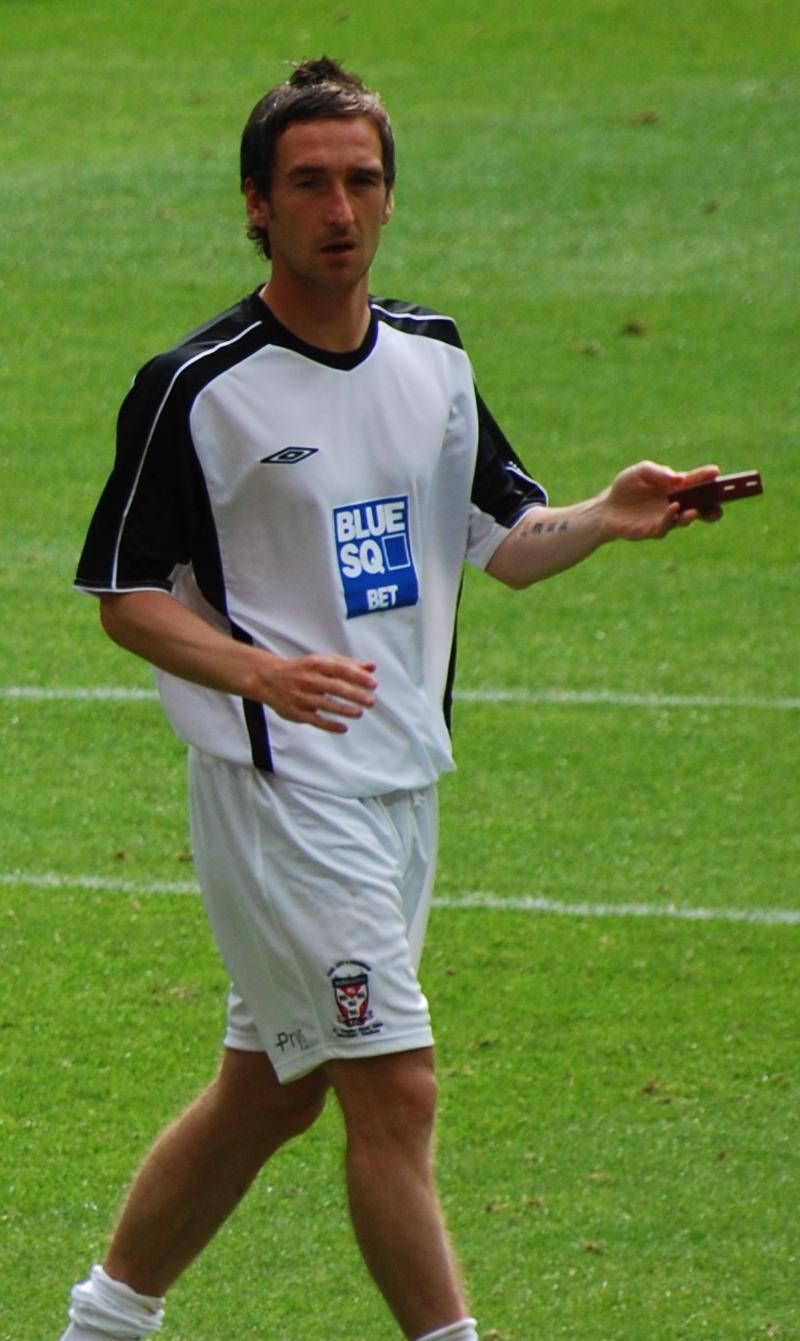
- Robinson with York City following the 2009 FA Trophy Final

Personal information
- Full name: Mark Andrew Robinson
- Date of birth: 24 July 1981 (age 45)
- Place of birth: Guisborough, England
- Height: 5 ft 10 in (1.78 m)
- Position: Defender

Team information
- Current team: Guisborough Town

Youth career
- Middlesbrough
- Nottingham Forest
- ?–1999: Hartlepool United

Senior career*
Years	Team	Apps	(Gls)
1999–2004	Hartlepool United	85	(0)
2003–2004	→ Spennymoor United (loan)	4	(0)
2004	→ Scarborough (loan)	2	(0)
2004–2005	Hereford United	36	(0)
2005–2007	Stockport County	59	(4)
2007	Torquay United	18	(0)
2007–2009	York City	68	(4)
2009–2010	Gateshead	17	(0)
2010	Gainsborough Trinity	10	(0)
2010	Whitby Town	6	(0)
2010–2011	Gainsborough Trinity	?	(?)
2011	→ Boston United (loan)	3	(0)
2011–2017	Whitby Town		
2017–	Guisborough Town		

International career
2005	England National Game XI	3	(1)

Managerial career
- 2016–2017: Whitby Town (player-coach)
- * Club domestic league appearances and goals as of 21:25, 9 November 2011 (UTC)

Mark Andrew Robinson (born 24 July 1981) is an English footballer who plays for Guisborough Town as a defender.

== Club career ==
Born in Guisborough, North Yorkshire, Robinson began his career with Middlesbrough's centre of excellence at the age of 14 and he joined Nottingham Forest on schoolboy forms. He signed for Hartlepool United on a Youth Training Scheme, before turning professional on 2 July 1999. He made his first team debut on 12 August 2000 in a 2–0 win away to Lincoln City and went on to make almost 100 appearances. He lost his place in the 2003–04 season, joining Spennymoor United on loan and in February 2004 joined Football Conference side Scarborough on a one-month loan.

He was released by Hartlepool United at the end of the 2003–04 season. He joined Hereford United in August 2004 on a short-term contract, which was extended until the end of the season in September 2004. Later that month he joined Stockport County, and appeared in all of the club's 51 league & cup matches during the 2005–06 season.

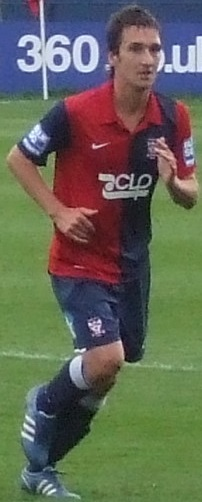
Robinson playing for York City in 2008

On 25 January 2007 he joined Torquay United on a free transfer on a contract until the end of the season, making his debut in the 4–1 win at home to Grimsby Town on 26 January 2007, Torquay's first win in 20 league games. He remained a regular until the end of the season as Torquay were relegated to the Conference Premier. In May 2007 his contract was not renewed, although he was invited back to the club for pre-season training.

He joined Conference Premier team York City on a free transfer on 18 June 2007. He suffered a broken leg in December, which ruled him out for three months. He returned to training in January 2008, and was expected to return to the side in February. He made his return in a reserve team game against Scunthorpe United during this month. York manager Colin Walker exercised his option for Robinson's contract to be extended for the 2008–09 season in April. During York's 2–0 victory against Rushden & Diamonds in October, Robinson played as a winger and scored the team's first goal. He was released by York following the end of the 2008–09 season, during which he made 47 appearances and scored two goals.

Robinson signed for newly promoted Conference Premier side Gateshead on a one-year contract on 23 June 2009. On 13 March 2010, Robinson joined Conference North team Gainsborough Trinity until the end of the 2009–10 season after his contract was cancelled by mutual consent. He joined Northern Premier League Premier Division team Whitby Town in the summer of 2010 following a trial. Robinson re-signed for Gainsborough on 30 September. He joined Conference North rivals Boston United on an initial-one month loan in February 2011, but after making three appearances he returned to Gainsborough in March after Boston opted not to extend the deal. He re-joined Whitby in August 2011, linking back up with ex-teammate Darren Williams, who subsequently replaced Tommy Cassidy as Town manager. Robinson played every minute of every competitive game, helping 'the Blues' dramatically escape relegation on the final day at Buxton.

== International career ==
While with Hereford United, Robinson represented the England National Game XI team in the Four Nations Tournament in May 2005. He was capped three times by the side, playing in matches against the Republic of Ireland, Wales and Scotland, and scored one goal.

== Career statistics ==
As of 16 March 2011.

Appearances and goals by club, season and competition
Club	Season	League^{[A]}		FA Cup		League Cup		Other^{[B]}		Total	
Club	Season	Apps	Goals	Apps	Goals	Apps	Goals	Apps	Goals	Apps	Goals
Hartlepool United	1999–2000	0	0	0	0	0	0	0	0	0	0
Hartlepool United	2000–01	6	0	0	0	1	0	0	0	7	0
Hartlepool United	2001–02	37	0	0	0	0	0	2	0	39	0
Hartlepool United	2002–03	38	0	0	0	1	0	0	0	39	0
Hartlepool United	2003–04	4	0	0	0	0	0	1	0	5	0
Hartlepool United	Total	85	0	0	0	2	0	3	0	90	0
Spennymoor United (loan)	2003–04	4	0	0	0	0	0	0	0	4	0
Scarborough (loan)	2003–04	2	0	0	0	0	0	0	0	2	0
Hereford United	2004–05	36	0	3	0	0	0	10	1	49	1
Stockport County	2005–06	46	2	3	0	1	0	1	0	51	2
Stockport County	2006–07	13	2	1	0	0	0	2	0	16	2
Stockport County	Total	59	4	4	0	1	0	3	0	67	4
Torquay United	2006–07	18	0	0	0	0	0	0	0	18	0
York City	2007–08	31	2	2	0	0	0	1	0	34	2
York City	2008–09	37	2	2	0	0	0	8	0	47	2
York City	Total	68	4	4	0	0	0	9	0	81	4
Gateshead	2009–10	17	0	0	0	0	0	5	0	22	0
Gainsborough Trinity	2009–10	10	0	0	0	0	0	0	0	10	0
Whitby Town	2010–11	6	0	0	0	0	0	0	0	6	0
Gainsborough Trinity	2010–11	?	?	?	?	0	0	?	?	?	?
Boston United (loan)	2010–11	3	0	0	0	0	0	0	0	3	0
Career total		308	8	11	0	3	0	30	1	352	9

A. The "League" column constitutes appearances and goals in the Football League, Football Conference and Northern Premier League.
B. The "Other" column constitutes appearances and goals in the Conference League Cup, FA Trophy, Football League Trophy and play-offs.
