= Marcus Richardson =

English footballer

Personal information
- Full name: Marcus Glenroy Richardson
- Date of birth: 31 August 1977 (age 49)
- Place of birth: Reading, England
- Position: Striker

Team information
- Current team: AFC Aldermaston (manager)

Senior career*
Years	Team	Apps	(Gls)
- Burnham
1999–2000	Slough Town		
2000–2001	Harrow Borough		
2001	Cambridge United	16	(2)
2001–2002	Torquay United	39	(8)
2002–2004	Hartlepool United	27	(5)
2003	→ Lincoln City (loan)	12	(4)
2003	→ Lincoln City (loan)	5	(0)
2004–2005	Lincoln City	35	(9)
2005	Rochdale	2	(0)
2005	Yeovil Town	4	(0)
2005–2006	Chester City	34	(4)
2006	Macclesfield Town	8	(3)
2006	Weymouth	0	(0)
2006–2007	Cambridge United	20	(3)
2007	Crawley Town	18	(2)
2007	Bury	1	(0)
2007–2009	Farnborough	88	(32)
2009	Henley Town		
2009–2010	Windsor & Eton		
2010–2012	Reading Town		
2012–2014	Marlow		
2014–2017	Highmoor Ibis		

Managerial career
- 2014–2017: Highmoor Ibis
- 2017–2021: Flackwell Heath
- 2023–: AFC Aldermaston
- * Club domestic league appearances and goals as of 12:58 8 January 2014 (UTC)

Marcus Glenroy Richardson (born 31 August 1977) is an English football manager and former professional footballer. He is manager of AFC Aldermaston

As a player he was a striker who notably played in the Football League for Torquay United, Hartlepool United, Lincoln City and Chester City. He also turned out professionally for Cambridge United, Rochdale, Yeovil Town, Macclesfield Town and Bury. He has played at Non-League level for Burhnam, Slough Town, Weymouth, Crawley Town, Farnborough, Henley Town, Windsor & Eton, Reading Town and Marlow. In 2014 he became player/manager of Highmoor Ibis.

== Playing career ==
Richardson began his career in non-league football. Following a move from Burnham, he made his debut for Slough Town in December 1999. A successful season with Slough alerted league scouts and he spent a week on trial with Cambridge United in July 2000. He moved to Harrow Borough for the start of the 2000–01 season and continued to attract attention from league clubs with appearances for Reading reserves in August 2000 and Wycombe Wanderers reserves in November 2000. He finally broke into the professional ranks by signing for Cambridge United on 16 March 2001, the same day that Dave Kitson also signed for Cambridge. The following day, he scored on his debut, netting a last-minute winner in a 3–2 win away to Stoke City. He moved to Torquay United on loan in September 2001, making the move permanent the following month at a cost of £5,000 for Torquay.

His spell at Torquay began with his as regular, although he was later mainly used as a substitute, competing with the likes of David Graham, Eifion Williams and Tony Bedeau for a place up front. He moved to Hartlepool United in October 2002 and would be joined at Hartlepool by Eifion Williams who had joined seven months earlier. He struggled to settle at Hartlepool, although did score against Torquay in a match almost postponed due to snow, Richardson landing in a pile of cleared snow in front of the Torquay fans during one attempt on goal. He gained cult status among Hartlepool fans and was known as "Tripod" due to his large member.

He had two spells on loan with Lincoln City in the 2003–04 season, before signing for Lincoln on a free transfer in January 2004. He was involved in "training ground incident" with Ciarán Toner early the following year, which resulted in both players being fined and loaned out to other clubs, Richardson joining Rochdale on loan in February 2005.

The following month he joined Yeovil Town on a free transfer, but was released at the end of the season, after just four appearances in which he failed to score. In June 2005 he joined Chester City, where he scored the killer third goal in the club's shock 3–0 FA Cup win over Nottingham Forest in December 2005. However, he only managed a handful of other goals for the club and joined Macclesfield Town on loan in March 2006, scoring twice on the final day of the season at Bristol Rovers to help assure the Silkmen's Football League safety.

He was released by Chester at the end of the 2005–06 season, and in July 2006 joined Weymouth. It was to be yet another nomadic 12-month period for Richardson. He failed to settle at Weymouth and left to rejoin Cambridge United on 21 August 2006 without playing a league game for Weymouth. He departed Cambridge in January 2007, joining Crawley Town. He duly left Crawley in the summer of 2007.

After a successful pre-season trial, he joined Bury on a month-to-month contract in August 2007, linking up with his erstwhile Lincoln City manager Keith Alexander. He played his only league game for the club in a surprise 2–1 win at Milton Keynes Dons on 11 August 2007 but was released at the end of his short-term contract on 31 August 2007.

In October 2007, Marcus joined Farnborough, scoring on his debut against Marlow. After nearly two seasons at the club he was released in the May 2009, following a change in manager.

Richardson signed for Henley Town in August 2009, scoring on his debut in a 6–0 victory over Prestwood on 16 August 2009.

== Coaching career ==
In July 2010, he moved on to join Reading Town where he also formed part of the management team. However, in June 2012, he moved with manager Mark Bartley to Marlow. He helped Marlow gain promotion into the Southern League as Hellenic League Premier Division champions. In January 2014, he returned to the Hellenic League, joining Highmoor Ibis as a player/manager. He resigned from the post in October 2017, before becoming manager at Flackwell Heath the following month. He left Flackwell Heath in October 2021. In July 2023 he was appointed manager of AFC Aldermaston.
