= Antony Sweeney =

English footballer (born 1983)

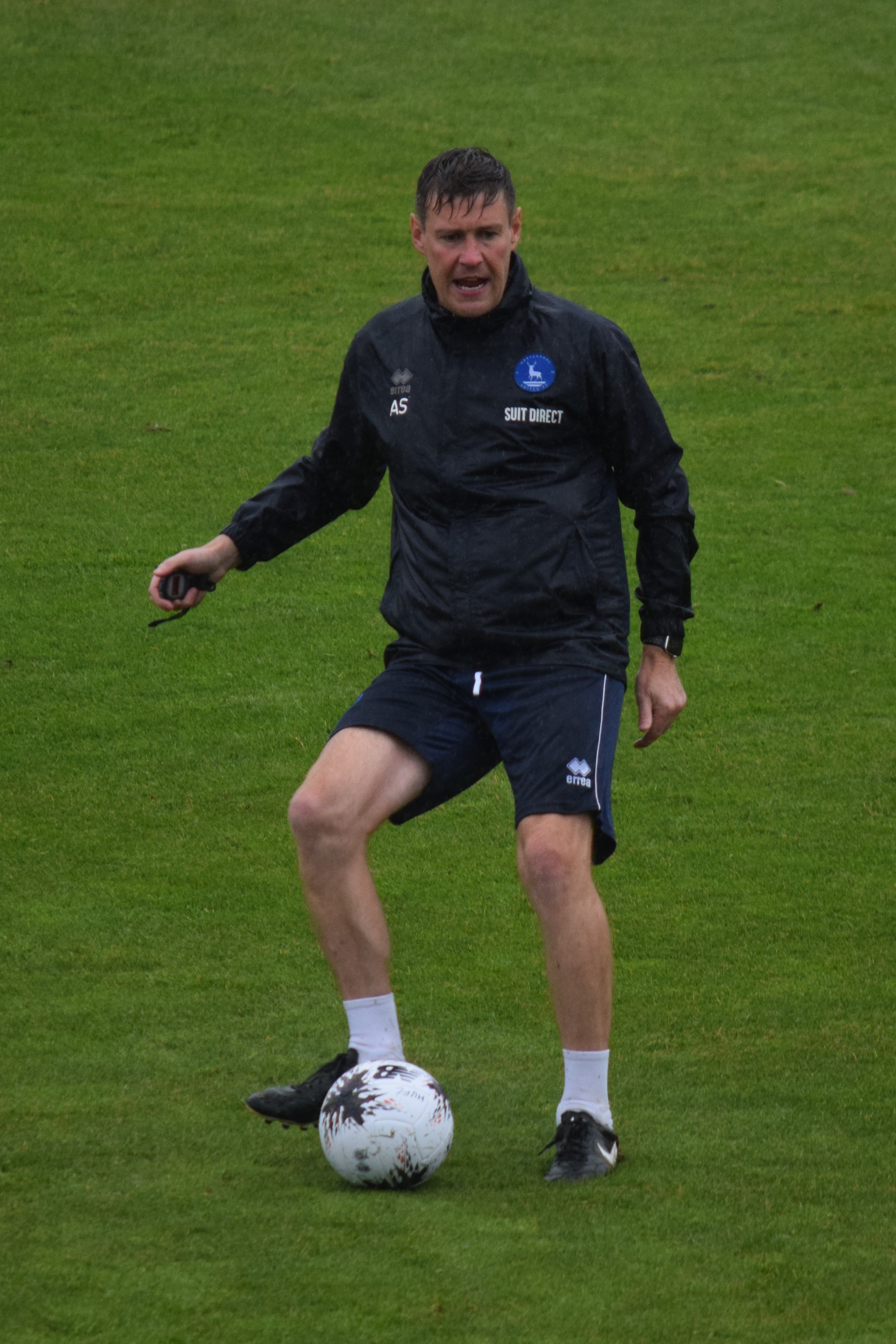
- Sweeney coaching before a Hartlepool United game in 2023

Personal information
- Full name: Antony Thomas Sweeney
- Date of birth: 5 September 1983 (age 43)
- Place of birth: Stockton-on-Tees, England
- Height: 6 ft 0 in (1.83 m)
- Position: Midfielder

Team information
- Current team: Sheffield Wednesday (assistant coach)

Senior career*
Years	Team	Apps	(Gls)
2001–2014	Hartlepool United	444	(52)
2014–2016	Carlisle United	48	(2)
2016	Gateshead	1	(0)
Total		493	(54)

Managerial career
- 2019: Hartlepool United (caretaker)
- 2021: Hartlepool United (caretaker)
- 2022: Hartlepool United (caretaker)
- 2022: Hartlepool United (caretaker)
- * Club domestic league appearances and goals

Antony Thomas Sweeney (born 5 September 1983) is an English professional football coach and former player. A midfielder, he played in the Football League for Hartlepool United and Carlisle United, in a senior career that lasted between 2001 and 2016. He is currently an assistant coach at Sheffield Wednesday.

In thirteen seasons with Hartlepool, he made 444 appearances, making him the third highest appearance maker in the club's history. During his time there, he won the player of the year accolade for the 2010–11 season and won two promotions out of the fourth tier. He left the club in 2014 for Carlisle United, where he spent two seasons, before retiring at National League side Gateshead.

After retiring in 2016, he returned to Hartlepool United, initially working with their youth team before becoming a first-team coach. His tenure there led to four individual spells as caretaker manager, between 2019 and 2022, whilst emerging as an ever-present in the senior coaching staff. A brief return to Gateshead as an assistant coach led to his return to the Football League, becoming a first-team coach at Crawley Town in 2024.

== Playing career ==
=== Hartlepool United ===
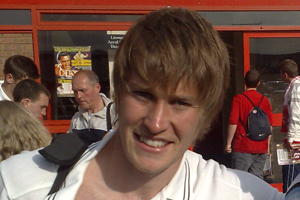
Sweeney after a Hartlepool United game in 2008

Antony Sweeney was born in Stockton-on-Tees. He joined Hartlepool's Youth Development programme, the same programme that developed players such as Adam Boyd and Jim Provett into first team regulars. He established himself as a hot prospect whilst in the youth team and was offered a permanent contract under Chris Turner.

In the 2001–02 season, Sweeney made his debut in the 3–0 win over York City after coming on as a substitute. On the first day of the following season, Sweeney made his first Hartlepool start in the 3–1 win over Carlisle United. However, despite his potential Sweeney found it difficult to establish himself as permanent fixture in the team and spent the majority of the following two seasons in the reserves.

However towards the end of the 2003–04 season, Sweeney was given a chance to cement his place in the first team due to injuries. Soon after, Sweeney quickly scored his first goal against former manager Mike Newell's Luton Town. Sweeney's second goal for the club gained him even more recognition as it was in the second leg of the play-off semi-final against Bristol City.

Sweeney's next season would prove to be even more action-packed as he played in 44 of Hartlepool's 46 league matches. He received his first red card against Milton Keynes Dons after a tussle with Izale McLeod but he more than made up for it when he scored his first hat-trick against Chesterfield in his next appearance. Sweeney's deceiving runs from midfield enabled him to get in behind opposition defences and this helped him to notch up 12 goals for the season, making him Hartlepool's highest scoring midfield player. This made him one of the front-runners for both Hartlepool's Fans' and Players' Player of the Year, but he missed out to Joel Porter and Adam Boyd respectively. Sweeney would start in the 2005 Football League One play-off final as Hartlepool were defeated in extra-time to Sheffield Wednesday.

Sweeney demonstrated his versatility by spending much of the 2009–10 season playing in an unfamiliar right-back role. In both the 2010–11 and 2011–12 seasons he prospered in his regular position of central midfield, top scoring in both campaigns with nine and eight goals respectively. Sweeney won Hartlepool's Supporters' and Player's Player of the Year award for the 2010–11 season. Ahead of the 2013–14 season, Sweeney was named as Hartlepool's new club captain but struggled for game time. Sweeney left at the end of the 2013–14 season having made 444 appearances in his thirteen years at the club. This placed him third in the all time appearances rankings.

=== Carlisle United ===
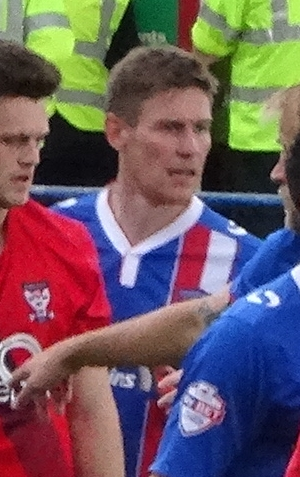
Sweeney playing for Carlisle United in 2015

On 20 June 2014, Sweeney signed a two-year deal with League Two side Carlisle United following their relegation from League One.

Sweeney was released at the end of his two years and signed for Gateshead. He made 58 appearances in all competitions for The Cumbrians.

=== Gateshead ===
Sweeney made one appearance for Gateshead, as a substitute in a 0–1 defeat at Forest Green Rovers before leaving to join previous club Hartlepool United as a coach.

== Coaching career ==
Sweeney holds a UEFA A Licence qualification. In 2016, Sweeney began coaching Hartlepool United U16s part-time while playing for Gateshead. After retiring from professional football in September 2016, Sweeney took up a full-time role at Hartlepool as youth development coach.

In January 2019, Sweeney began coaching Hartlepool's first team as a part of Craig Hignett's backroom staff. Following the departure of first team manager Hignett, Sweeney was appointed caretaker manager at Hartlepool in October 2019. Sweeney returned to his previous role as first team coach when Dave Challinor was appointed Pools manager in November 2019.

Sweeney was appointed interim manager after Dave Challinor left the club to join Stockport County in November 2021. He won his first game in charge, a 1–0 win against Everton U21s in the EFL Trophy. He finished his second spell in charge with a 3–0 win against Sheffield Wednesday in the EFL Trophy.

On 2 March 2022, Sweeney signed a long-term contract with the club. The deal would see him to continue to work with the Hartlepool first team while also helping to re-develop the club's academy.

In March 2022, at the annual North East Football Writers Association Awards, Sweeney received the prestigious John Fotheringham Award which goes to someone who has made a significant contribution to football in the North East.

Following the appointment of Kevin Phillips in January 2024, Sweeney was announced as one of Phillips' assistant managers. On 9 May 2024, it was confirmed that Sweeney would depart the club. On his departure, Sweeney said: "I would like thank everyone at the Club for the support they have given me over the years. It has given me enormous pride and pleasure to represent Hartlepool United as both a player and as a coach, and I leave with some incredible memories on and off the pitch."

On 1 July 2024, it was announced that Sweeney had been appointed as a first team coach at National League side Gateshead as a part of Rob Elliot's coaching staff.

On 1 October 2024, Sweeney joined Elliot in moving to Crawley Town. In March 2025, he departed the club following the sacking of Elliot.

On 1 August 2025, Sweeney joined League One club Stockport County as a first-team coach, reuniting with manager Dave Challinor whom he had worked with at Hartlepool United.

On 3 November 2026, Sweeney joined League One club Sheffield Wednesday as a first-team coach, again reuniting with manager Dave Challinor for a third time.

== Career statistics ==
Appearances and goals by club, season and competition
Club	Season	League			FA Cup		League Cup		Other		Total	
Club	Season	Division	Apps	Goals	Apps	Goals	Apps	Goals	Apps	Goals	Apps	Goals
Hartlepool United	2001–02	Division Three	2	0	0	0	0	0	0	0	2	0
Hartlepool United	2002–03	Division Three	4	0	0	0	0	0	1	0	5	0
Hartlepool United	2003–04	Division Two	11	1	0	0	0	0	2	1	13	2
Hartlepool United	2004–05	League One	44	13	6	0	2	1	5	1	57	15
Hartlepool United	2005–06	League One	35	5	2	0	2	0	1	0	40	5
Hartlepool United	2006–07	League Two	35	4	1	0	2	0	0	0	38	4
Hartlepool United	2007–08	League One	36	4	2	0	1	0	2	0	41	4
Hartlepool United	2008–09	League One	44	5	5	0	3	0	1	0	53	5
Hartlepool United	2009–10	League One	42	2	1	0	2	0	0	0	45	2
Hartlepool United	2010–11	League One	40	9	4	4	2	0	2	1	48	14
Hartlepool United	2011–12	League One	39	8	1	0	1	1	1	0	42	9
Hartlepool United	2012–13	League One	34	1	1	1	1	0	1	0	37	2
Hartlepool United	2013–14	League Two	19	0	2	0	1	0	1	0	23	0
Total			385	52	25	5	17	2	17	3	444	62
Carlisle United	2014–15	League Two	29	1	1	0	1	0	1	1	32	2
Carlisle United	2015–16	League Two	19	1	4	3	2	0	1	0	26	4
Total			48	2	5	3	3	0	2	1	58	6
Gateshead	2016–17	National League	1	0	0	0	0	0	0	0	1	0
Career total			434	54	30	8	20	2	19	4	503	68

== Managerial statistics ==
As of match played 20 September 2022

Managerial record by team and tenure
Team	From	To	Record					Ref
Team	From	To	P	W	D	L	Win %	Ref
Hartlepool United (caretaker)	10 October 2019	11 November 2019	5	3	1	1	60.0	
Hartlepool United (interim manager)	1 November 2021	1 December 2021	8	3	1	4	37.5	
Hartlepool United (joint caretaker)	5 May 2022	3 June 2022	1	0	0	1	0.0	
Hartlepool United (caretaker)	18 September 2022	21 September 2022	1	0	1	0	0.0	
Total			15	6	3	6	40.00	—

== Honours ==
Hartlepool United

- Football League Third Division runner-up: 2002–03
- Football League Two runner-up: 2006–07

Individual

- Hartlepool United Supporters' Player of the Year: 2010–11
- Hartlepool United Players' Player of the Year: 2010–11
