= Jim Provett =

English footballer

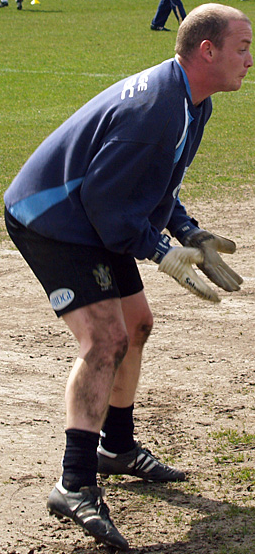

Personal information
- Full name: Robert James Provett
- Date of birth: 22 December 1982 (age 43)
- Place of birth: Trimdon, England
- Position: Goalkeeper

Youth career
- Trimdon FC and Hartlepool

Senior career*
Years	Team	Apps	(Gls)
1999–2007	Hartlepool United	66	(0)
2007–2008	Bury	32	(0)
2008–2009	Harrogate Town	26	(0)
2009–2010	Gateshead	18	(0)
2010–2012	Norton & Stockton Ancients		
2014–2016	Darlington		
- * Club domestic league appearances and goals

James Robert Provett (born 22 December 1982) is an English former footballer who played as a goalkeeper in the Football League for Hartlepool United and Bury.

== Playing career ==
Jim Provett came through Hartlepool United's youth development programme, the same programme that developed players such as Adam Boyd and Antony Sweeney. It was there where he developed into a good shot-stopper and he was offered a professional contract by the then manager Chris Turner in 2001. Provett's professional contract saw the departure of Martin Hollund who was released.

In 2002, Provett made his debut against Tranmere Rovers in the Football League Trophy. However, during his debut he conceded five goals. For the remainder of the season Provett struggled to dislodge Anthony Williams who played in all of Hartlepool's league games.

During the following 2003–04 season Provett was handed his opportunity to impress in the League Cup against Sheffield Wednesday. During this match he made a save during a penalty shoot out to win Hartlepool the match. He kept his place in the team for the remainder of the season and was named the Hartlepool's Players' Player and Fans' Player of the Season.

For the start of the 2004–05 season Provett was given the number one goalkeepers shirt. He started the first few games of the season but soon faced stiff competition from Dimitrios Konstantopoulos who eventually overtook him as Hartlepool's first choice keeper. As the season approached its final quarter, Provett handed in a transfer request due to lack of first team appearances. However, he withdrew this request the week before Hartlepool played the second leg of the play-off semi-final.

After failing to make the first team for the following two seasons, Provett stalled on a new contract. However, before he resigned Hartlepool withdrew their offer and he left the club. In July 2007, he joined Bury on trial. After passing a medical, Provett joined Bury and was their new number one keeper. He was released by Bury FC after making 41 appearances for the club at the end of the 2007–08 season.

On 3 July 2008, Harrogate Town released the news that Provett had signed for them. He became the number 1 for Harrogate Town and made a reputation for producing great save after great save. However, due to cost-cutting measures the entire Harrogate squad was put up for sale. Provett was transferred to Gateshead on 11 February 2009. After making 19 appearances (including one game in 2009 against Chester City, whose record was expunged that season), Gateshead released Provett after the 2009–10 season. Provett went on to join Norton and Stockton Ancients of the Northern League.

== Coaching career ==
While playing for Norton and Stockton Ancients, he went on to train budding goalkeepers for 'Just4Keepers', founded by former Everton goalkeeper Ray Newland.

In the summer of 2013 he left Norton to rejoin Hartlepool United, this time as goalkeeper coach, taking over from Andy Collett, who left to take up the same role with York City. In the 2014 close season, he joined Darlington as goalkeeping player-coach. Provett left Darlington in 2016.

Provett returned to Darlington as goalkeeping coach in July 2019, and resigned on 30 September 2023.

== Personal life ==
Provett combines his work as a part-time goalkeeper coach alongside working as a secondary school maths teacher.

== Career statistics ==
Appearances and goals by club, season and competition
Club	Season	League			FA Cup		League Cup		Other		Total	
Club	Season	Division	Apps	Goals	Apps	Goals	Apps	Goals	Apps	Goals	Apps	Goals
Hartlepool United	2002–03	Division Three	0	0	0	0	0	0	1	0	1	0
Hartlepool United	2003–04	Division Two	45	0	3	0	2	0	2	0	52	0
Hartlepool United	2004–05	League One	21	0	1	0	1	0	0	0	23	0
Hartlepool United	2005–06	League One	0	0	0	0	0	0	0	0	0	0
Hartlepool United	2006–07	League Two	0	0	0	0	0	0	2	0	2	0
Hartlepool United	Total		66	0	4	0	3	0	5	0	78	0
Bury	2007–08	League Two	32	0	5	0	1	0	3	0	41	0
Career total			98	0	9	0	4	0	8	0	119	0

== Honours ==
Individual

- Hartlepool United Player of the Year: 2004
