= Danny Byrne =

Irish footballer (born 1984)

Daniel Byrne (born 30 November 1984) is former professional footballer who played as a midfielder. He played for Manchester United, Hartlepool United (on loan), Weymouth, Newcastle Town, Mossley, Flixton, Southport, Droylsden, Runcorn F.C. Halton (on loan), Leigh RMI, Witton Albion, Ashton United and Salford City. Internationally, he represented Ireland.

He is Head of Player Development at League Two club Salford City.

== Playing career ==
=== Manchester United ===
Byrne began his career with Premier League giants Manchester United signing his first professional contract in 2003. On 25 November 2003, Byrne moved on loan to Hartlepool United who were then in League One and chasing for the play-offs. He made his Hartlepool debut in their 2–0 home win over Swindon Town on 29 November 2003. He made one more appearance for Hartlepool in the league – a 4–1 loss to promotion rivals Queens Park Rangers – and one in the FA Cup, a 1–0 televised win over non-league Burton Albion. He returned to Manchester United in December 2003 and was told his contract would not be renewed. Byrne left Manchester United in February 2004. He failed to make a single appearance for the Red Devils.

=== Non-league career ===
Following his departure from Manchester United, Byrne had unsuccessful trials at Reading and Walsall. After several months as a free agent, Byrne signed for non-league side Weymouth.

After leaving Weymouth, Byrne went on to play non-league football for Newcastle Town, Mossley, Flixton, Southport, Droylsden, Runcorn F.C. Halton (on loan), Leigh RMI, Witton Albion, Ashton United and Salford City.

While at Droyslden, he was nominated in the Non-League National Game awards. Also during his non-league career, Byrne had an unsuccessful trial with Scottish side Dundee.

== International career ==
In April 2003, Byrne was named in the Irish U-19 national team.

== Coaching career ==
In 2008, Byrne began working as an academy coach at Manchester United. He left in October 2020 to join Salford City working with the development squad. He began working as part of Salford's first-team coaching staff in the 2021–22 season and worked as a First Team Coach under Neil Wood from the start of the 2022–23 season. In June 2023, it was announced Byrne had taken up a new role at Salford as the club's Head of Player Development.

== Personal life ==
Byrne was born in Frimley, Surrey.
