= Andy Jordan (footballer) =

English-born Scottish footballer

Personal information
- Full name: Andrew Joseph Jordan
- Date of birth: 14 December 1979 (age 46)
- Place of birth: Manchester, England
- Position: Defender

Senior career*
Years	Team	Apps	(Gls)
1997–2000	Bristol City	11	(0)
2000–2003	Cardiff City	5	(0)
2003–2004	Hartlepool United	5	(0)
Total		21	(0)

International career
1999–2000	Scotland under-21	4	(0)
- * Club domestic league appearances and goals

Andrew Joseph Jordan (born 14 December 1979) is an English-born Scottish former professional footballer and Scotland under-21 international, who made 21 appearances in The Football League between 1997 and 2005, equivalent to an average of just 2.3 games each year he was employed as a footballer. He is the son of former Scotland international Joe Jordan and the brother of semi-professional Tom Jordan.

== Career ==
Born in Manchester, Jordan began his career as a trainee at Bristol City (where his dad Joe Jordan was then the manager) and he made eleven league appearances (52% of all the appearances he would ever make).[3] Throughout his entire career he scored only one goal, for Bristol City, his goal coming in a League Cup tie against Nottingham Forest in September 1999. In October 2000 he joined Cardiff City for a fee of £30,000, making his debut in a 4–0 victory over York City on 4 November 2000. Yet Jordan made just four appearances during his time at Cardiff, during which he scored two own goals, As said by Chris O'Brien in 2002, "Andy Jordan has only made 6 starts for the Bluebirds since signing from Bristol City, and has already netted 2 own goals. I doubt very much that he will ever play another game for Cardiff City!" Jordan was struck by injury which severely restricted his remaining time at Ninian Park as he remained sidelined for two years and was allowed to leave the club in May 2003.

After talks with Cardiff's South Wales rivals Swansea City, Jordan joined Hartlepool United in July 2003 (for a singing fee of £0). He made his debut on the opening day of the 2003–04 season in a 4–3 win over Peterborough United on 8 August 2003. Having made just five first-team appearances for the side, Jordan was again struck by injury and subsequently retired from professional football.

== Career statistics ==
Club statistics
Club	Season	League		National Cup		League Cup		Other		Total	
Club	Season	App	Goals	App	Goals	App	Goals	App	Goals	App	Goals
Bristol City	1997–98	0	0	0	0	0	0	0	0	0	0
Bristol City	1998–99	1	0	0	0	0	0	0	0	1	0
Bristol City	1999–00	8	0	0	0	1	1	1	0	10	1
Bristol City	2000–01	2	0	0	0	1	0	0	0	3	0
Bristol City	Subtotal	11	0	0	0	2	1	1	0	14	1
Cardiff City	2000–01	5	0	1	0	0	0	0	0	6	0
Cardiff City	2001–02	0	0	0	0	0	0	0	0	0	0
Cardiff City	2002–03	0	0	0	0	0	0	0	0	0	0
Cardiff City	Subtotal	5	0	1	0	0	0	0	0	6	0
Hartlepool United	2003–04	5	0	1	0	0	0	0	0	6	0
Hartlepool United	2004–05	0	0	0	0	0	0	0	0	0	0
Hartlepool United	Subtotal	5	0	1	0	0	0	0	0	6	0
Total		21	0	2	0	2	1	1	0	26	1

== Honours ==
Bristol City

- Football League Trophy runner-up: 1999–2000
