= Hugh Robertson (footballer, born 1975) =

Scottish footballer

Personal information
- Full name: Hugh Scott Robertson
- Date of birth: 19 March 1975 (age 51)
- Place of birth: Aberdeen, Scotland
- Positions: Left back; left midfielder

Youth career
- Youth: Lewis United

Senior career*
Years	Team	Apps	(Gls)
1991–1997	Aberdeen	22	(2)
1997–2001	Dundee	25	(1)
1998	→ Brechin City (loan)	7	(0)
1998	→ Inverness Caledonian Thistle (loan)	12	(1)
2000–2001	→ Ayr United (loan)	8	(2)
2001–2004	Ross County	104	(13)
2004–2006	Hartlepool United	40	(6)
2006–2008	Ross County	28	(2)
2009–2014	Culter		

International career
1994	Scotland under-21	1	(0)

Managerial career
- 2014–2016: Culter
- * Club domestic league appearances and goals

Hugh Scott Robertson (born 19 March 1975), affectionately known by fans as "Hugh the Hammer", is a Scottish former professional footballer known for his versatility as a left back and left midfielder. He began his career with Aberdeen, making 22 appearances and scoring twice. Robertson then moved to Dundee, where he had loan spells at Brechin City, Inverness Caledonian Thistle, and Ayr United. His most notable tenure was with Ross County, where he played over 100 games and scored 13 goals. He also had a stint with Hartlepool United before returning to Ross County and later playing for Culter. Robertson represented Scotland at the under-21 level, finalising his career following his transition into a managerial role with Culter.

== Playing career ==
=== Aberdeen ===
Robertson started his career playing in the youth team for Aberdeen. He was loaned out to junior football team, Lewis United for a season to continue his apprenticeship. Aberdeen were satisfied enough with his progress to offer him another contract which he signed in 1993. While at Aberdeen, Shuggy made 22 Premier appearances, scoring twice. However, he never quite established himself as a first team regular and he was sold to Dundee in January 1997.

=== Dundee ===
He started brightly for Dundee and played in 15 of the team's remaining fixtures. However, he failed to figure in Dundee's following promotion season, which was partly due to a family bereavement. His lack of first team football saw manager Jocky Scott loan him to Brechin City and Inverness. It looked as though Robertson was heading out of the club until he was surprisingly recalled to the side for the December win at Tynecastle. This saw Robertson rediscover his form and Robertson become a regular for the remainder of the season 1998–99 season. However, in 2000, Robertson once again gradually found his first team opportunities limited and he spent two months on loan to Ayr United before he was signed by Neale Cooper for Ross County in February 2001.

=== Ross County ===
Robertson formed a strong relationship with manager Neale Cooper and he found himself playing regular football for the next three years. Robertson played over league 100 games, scoring 13 goals. He was played in a number of positions and he even found himself playing up front for a short period of time. Despite his popularity amongst the Ross County fans, Hugh Robertson decided to follow his former manager Neale Cooper and signed for Hartlepool United in January 2004.

=== Hartlepool United ===
Robertson made his Hartlepool debut against Barnsley and initially seemed to lack pace and stamina during his first few games at Hartlepool and the fans were unsure of whether he would be a success. However, Robertson won the fans over in a memorable performance against Blackpool. This match saw Hugh Robertson take several free kicks that were inches away from going in. As the match entered its final quarter Robertson stepped up and took another free kick and scored. However, the goal was disallowed as the referee had deemed it to have been taken too early. Not to be deterred, Robertson retook the free kick and scored, placing the ball in almost an identical position.

Robertson continued scoring from free kicks and long distances and this earned him cult status amongst the Hartlepool fans who began calling him "Hugh the Hammer". Robertson scored yet another memorable long distance goal, this time against Luton. As the ball spun towards him from open play, Robertson smashed the ball into the back of the net. Robertson hit the ball so powerfully that it gave the keeper little time to react and by the time he had dived the ball was already in the net. This goal earned him the 2004 Hartlepool United Goal of the Season award and it is widely regarded as one of the best Hartlepool goals of the club's history. In his first season at the club Robertson scored 4 goals despite only arriving towards the end. All of these goals bar one were from outside the box. Despite his record from free kicks, Robertson claimed that he has never practised free kicks.

Robertson started the 2004–05 season in much the same fashion and scored another free kick against Bradford City on the opening day. However, Robertson's season was cut short after a niggling foot and ankle injury required surgery and kept him out for the majority of the season. The following season saw Robertson finally regain fitness and he appeared in the match against AFC Bournemouth.

However, Robertson suffered from the same recurring injury and was once again injured. He was released from Hartlepool shortly after, and in August 2006 rejoined his former club Ross County. In the summer of 2007, Robertson was given a one-year contract extension with County after impressing in the 2006 season.

== Honours ==
=== Aberdeen ===
- Scottish League Cup: 1

1995–96

=== Ross County ===
- Scottish Challenge Cup: 1

2006–07
