= Steven Istead =

English footballer

Personal information
- Full name: Steven Brian Istead
- Date of birth: 23 April 1986 (age 40)
- Place of birth: South Shields, England
- Position: Midfielder

Youth career
- 2000–2002: Newcastle United

Senior career*
Years	Team	Apps	(Gls)
2002–2006	Hartlepool United	64	(3)
2006	Gateshead	17	(0)
2006–2007	Consett		
2007–2008	Peterhead	24	(1)
2008–2009	Ilkeston Town		
2009–2011	Mansfield Town	44	(1)
2009	→ Alfreton Town (loan)		
2011–13	Eastwood Town		
2013–2015	Buxton	98	(6)
2015–2018	Shaw Lane		
2018–2019	Handsworth		

Managerial career
- 2011: Eastwood Town (Caretaker/Player-Manager)
- 2019: Handsworth (Interim Player-Manager)
- * Club domestic league appearances and goals

Steven Brian Istead (born 23 April 1986) is an English former professional footballer.

== Career ==
Born in South Shields, Istead began his career with the youth team of Newcastle United. He left without making a first-team appearance, and signed for Hartlepool United in 2002, where he held the record for the youngest player to ever play for Hartlepool United until it was beaten in 2004 by striker David Foley. He also became the youngest player to score for Hartlepool, aged 17 years and 112 days old, when he scored in a 2–2 draw against Sheffield Wednesday in the League Cup in 2003, however, this record was broken in 2012 by Luke James. Despite making his senior debut in 2002, Istead didn't sign his first professional contract with Hartlepool until June 2005. However, he was released from his contract less than a year later, in May 2006. During his four seasons with Hartlepool, Istead made a total of 64 appearances in the Football League.

Istead later played for non-league clubs Gateshead and Consett, before moving to Scottish side Peterhead in 2007, where he made 24 appearances in the Scottish Football League Second Division alongside his former Hartlepool boss Neale Cooper. After one season in Scotland, Istead returned south of the border to play for Ilkeston Town. On 10 June 2009, Istead signed for Mansfield Town. On 1 December 2009, Istead joined Alfreton Town of the Conference North on a month-long loan deal. After being released by Mansfield at the end of the 2010–11 season, Istead signed for Eastwood Town in June 2011.

He took temporary charge of Eastwood Town for three games while a new manager was being appointed in October 2011.

Istead joined Buxton at the beginning on the 2013–14 season and was named as the club captain. He moved to Shaw Lane in 2015 before moving onto Handsworth in 2018. Istead took over as interim manager of Handsworth in 2019 but opted the leave the club at the end of the season.
