= Eifion Williams =

Welsh footballer

Personal information
- Full name: Eifion Wyn Williams
- Date of birth: 15 November 1975 (age 50)
- Place of birth: Bangor, Wales
- Height: 5 ft 11 in (1.80 m)
- Positions: Striker; winger

Senior career*
Years	Team	Apps	(Gls)
1995–1997	Caernarfon Town	75	(63)
1997–1999	Barry Town	60	(68)
1999–2002	Torquay United	107	(24)
2002–2007	Hartlepool United	208	(50)
2007–2008	Wrexham	13	(1)
2008–????	Jarrow Roofing		

International career
1999	Wales B	1	(0)
- * Club domestic league appearances and goals as of 04:52, 11 May 2008 (UTC)

Eifion Wyn Williams (born 15 November 1975) is a Welsh former footballer who played over 300 games in the Football League, over 200 of which were for Hartlepool United. He has represented Wales at B level as well as Ynys Môn at the Island Games, in which he was top scorer in 1997, with 6 goals. He played either as a striker or on the wing.

== Football career ==
Williams was born in Bangor in North Wales and began his career as a Wolverhampton Wanderers apprentice. However, things did not work out and he moved back to Anglesey and joined League of Wales side Caernarfon Town, while working on a building site. Williams scored freely for Caernarfon and this attracted the attention of bigger clubs. On the eve of the 1997–98 season, Williams left Caernarfon for Barry Town, then the only professional side in the League of Wales, breaking their transfer fee in the process at a cost of £25,000. He immediately began scoring regularly, including one against Dynamo Kyiv in the UEFA Champions League.

Williams also helped Barry Town record their highest win when he contributed four goals to help Barry Town beat Conwy United 9–0. Williams' performances and goal scoring record attracted scouts from English football league clubs.

On 25 March 1999, after over 200 League of Wales goals in four seasons, Torquay United paid £70,000 (breaking their transfer record) to sign Williams, beating off competition from a number of clubs, possibly helped by his Barry teammates Lee Barrow and Paul Mitchell, both former Torquay players, passing on happy memories of Plainmoor. He made his league debut against Hartlepool United and made an instant impact as he became only the second Torquay player to score a hat-trick on his debut (the first being Peter Laraman in the 6–2 defeat of Barnsley in September 1961). Unfortunately this led to massive expectations being placed on Williams' shoulders, for example, Neville Southall, in goal for Torquay that day, predicted, "He can go all the way to the Premiership."

Injuries later affected his form, causing him to play with a broken toe for part of 2000–01, although he still managed nine goals in a dismal season. He was placed on the transfer list on 2 November 2001 by mutual consent after finding himself playing mainly as a substitute in Roy McFarland's side and left to join Hartlepool United on 5 March 2002 for a fee of £30,000.

Williams spent his first weeks with Hartlepool playing for the reserves to gain match fitness. However it was not long before Williams made his Hartlepool debut against Bristol Rovers after coming on as a substitute, replacing Gordon Watson. As the season reached its climax, Williams notched five goals in 10 appearances to help Pools make the play-offs.

The following season saw Williams play in 45 of Hartlepool's 46 league matches. Due to the injury of Gordon Watson he became Hartlepool's first choice striker and finished as Hartlepool's top scorer, scoring 15 goals in 45 games and helped Hartlepool get automatic promotion.

William's first season in League One saw him repeat the success of the previous season as he participated in 41 games and scored 13 goals despite playing right wing for a large majority of the season. His performances earned him a call up to Mark Hughes' Welsh national side. However the season would end bitterly for Williams as he picked up an injury during Hartlepool's play-off defeat to Bristol City and missed out on the opportunity to play for his country.

Williams' spent the majority of the 2004–05 season on the right wing with manager Neale Cooper preferring the partnership of Adam Boyd and Joel Porter up front. This reduced his goal scoring record as he only managed to score five goals in 41 appearances. However, he did manage to equalise for Hartlepool in their play-off final against Sheffield Wednesday in front of a crowd of 59,808 at the Millennium Stadium, Hartlepool went on to lose 4–2 after extra time.

The 2005–06 season saw Williams once again playing up front due to the injuries of Adam Boyd, Joel Porter and James Brown. During this season he managed to score eight goals.

Williams was released from his Hartlepool United contract at the end of the 2006–07 season in a season which saw Hartlepool promoted back to League 1 and Eifion scoring Hartlepool's goal of the season for his stunning strike in a 3–0 win over arch-rivals Darlington.

Williams was signed by League Two side Wrexham on a two-year contract on 11 June 2007. He scored two goals on his début in a 3–2 home defeat friendly to Liverpool. Liverpool were 3–0 up at half-time.

He retired during the 2007–08 football season and returned to the north-east of England to be with his family. He scored his first and only goal for Wrexham in a 1–0 win over Bury on 4 December 2007. However, he injured his hamstring scoring the goal and was replaced by Marc Williams shortly afterwards. This turned out to be his final appearance as a professional.

However, Williams came out of retirement to sign for North-East Northern League Division One part-time club Jarrow Roofing.

== Recognition ==
In April 2013, Williams was inducted into the Welsh Premier League hall of fame.

== Post-retirement ==
Whilst playing part-time for Northern League side Jarrow Roofing, Williams began working for Hartlepool Youth Offending Service. He currently still resides in Hartlepool, with his family, where he is head of year and works as a learning manager at Dyke House Academy.

== Career statistics ==
Appearances and goals by club, season and competition
Club	Season	League			FA Cup		League Cup		Other		Total	
Club	Season	Division	Apps	Goals	Apps	Goals	Apps	Goals	Apps	Goals	Apps	Goals
Torquay United	1998–99	Division Three	7	5	0	0	0	0	0	0	7	5
Torquay United	1999–00	Division Three	42	9	3	0	2	0	1	0	48	9
Torquay United	2000–01	Division Three	37	9	0	0	1	0	1	0	39	9
Torquay United	2001–02	Division Three	21	1	0	0	2	0	1	0	25	1
Torquay United	Total		107	24	3	0	5	0	3	0	118	24
Hartlepool United	2001–02	Division Three	8	4	0	0	0	0	2	1	10	5
Hartlepool United	2002–03	Division Three	45	15	2	0	1	1	0	0	48	16
Hartlepool United	2003–04	Division Two	41	13	3	0	2	0	3	1	49	14
Hartlepool United	2004–05	League One	38	5	3	1	2	1	5	1	48	8
Hartlepool United	2005–06	League One	36	7	2	0	0	0	1	0	39	7
Hartlepool United	2006–07	League Two	40	6	3	0	1	0	1	0	45	6
Hartlepool United	Total		208	50	13	1	6	2	12	3	239	56
Wrexham	2007–08	League Two	13	1	1	0	1	0	0	0	15	1
Career total			318	75	17	1	12	2	15	3	362	81

== Honours ==
Hartlepool United

- Third Division runner-up: 2002–03
- League Two runner-up: 2006–07

Individual

- League of Wales Golden Boot winner: 1997–98, 1998–99
