= 2000–01 Hartlepool United F.C. season =

Hartlepool United
2000–01 season
- Owner: IOR
- Chairman: Ken Hodcroft
- Manager: Chris Turner
- Stadium: Victoria Park
- Division Three: 4th
- FA Cup: First round (Eliminated by Scunthorpe United)
- Football League Cup: First round (Eliminated by Burnley)
- Football League Trophy: Third round (Eliminated by Lincoln City)
- Top goalscorer: League: Kevin Henderson (17); All: Tommy Miller (20)
- Highest home attendance: 5,836 (vs Blackpool)
- Lowest home attendance: 1,090 (vs Burnley)
- Average home league attendance: 3,483
- Biggest win: 6–1 (vs. Barnet)
- Biggest defeat: 4–1 (vs. Burnley)

The 2000–01 season was Hartlepool United's 94th year in existence. Along with competing in Division Three, the club also participated in the FA Cup, League Cup and League Trophy. The season covers the period from 1 July 2000 to 30 June 2001.

== Players ==
As of End of Season.

=== First-team squad ===
Note: Flags indicate national team as defined under FIFA eligibility rules; some limited exceptions apply. Players may hold more than one non-FIFA nationality.

No.	Pos.	Nation	Player
1	GK	NOR	Martin Hollund
2	DF	ENG	Darren Knowles
3	MF	ENG	Sam Shilton
4	DF	ENG	Michael Barron
5	DF	ENG	Gary Strodder
6	MF	ENG	Lee Fitzpatrick
7	DF	ENG	Paul Arnison
8	MF	ENG	Tommy Miller
9	FW	ENG	Tony Lormor
10	FW	NOR	Tim Sperrevik
11	MF	ENG	Ian Clark
12	FW	ENG	Craig Midgley
13	DF	ENG	James Sharp
14	FW	ENG	Kevin Henderson
15	MF	NOR	Thomas Tennebø

No.	Pos.	Nation	Player
16	DF	ENG	Chris Westwood
17	MF	ENG	Paul Stephenson
18	DF	ENG	Graeme Lee
19	MF	ENG	Andy McAvoy
20	FW	ENG	Adam Boyd
21	DF	ENG	Mark Robinson
22	FW	ENG	Colin West
23	GK	WAL	Anthony Williams
24	DF	NIR	Gordon Simms
25	DF	ENG	Rory Barker
26	FW	WAL	Jermaine Easter
27	MF	ENG	Mark Tinkler
28	DF	ENG	Andy Brownrigg
29	DF	ENG	Neil Aspin

== Results ==
=== Pre-season friendlies ===
15 July 2000	Hartlepool United	4–3	Aberdeen	Hartlepool
15:00	Midgley 36', 86'; Henderson 50'; Strodder 75'	Report	Jess 31'; Stavrum 35'; Solberg 55'	Stadium: Victoria Park; Attendance: 1,449

=== Division Three ===
==== League table ====
Pos	Team	Pld	W	D	L	GF	GA	GD	Pts	Qualification or relegation
2	Cardiff City (P)	46	23	13	10	95	58	+37	82	Promotion to Football League Second Division
3	Chesterfield (P)	46	25	14	7	79	42	+37	80 (Note: Chesterfield had 9 points deducted.)	Promotion to Football League Second Division
4	Hartlepool United	46	21	14	11	71	54	+17	77	Qualification for the Third Division play-offs
5	Leyton Orient	46	20	15	11	59	51	+8	75	Qualification for the Third Division play-offs
6	Hull City	46	19	17	10	47	39	+8	74	Qualification for the Third Division play-offs

Rules for classification: 1) Points; 2) Goal difference; 3) Goals scored
(P) Promoted

==== Results summary ====
Overall								Home						Away					
Pld	W	D	L	GF	GA	GD	Pts	W	D	L	GF	GA	GD	W	D	L	GF	GA	GD
46	21	14	11	71	54	+17	77	12	8	3	40	23	+17	9	6	8	31	31	0

==== Results by matchday ====
Round	1	2	3	4	5	6	7	8	9	10	11	12	13	14	15	16	17	18	19	20	21	22	23	24	25	26	27	28	29	30	31	32	33	34	35	36	37	38	39	40	41	42	43	44	45	46
Ground	A	H	A	H	H	A	A	H	A	H	H	A	A	H	A	H	A	H	A	H	A	H	H	A	A	H	A	A	H	A	A	H	H	A	H	A	H	A	H	H	A	H	A	H	A	H
Result	W	L	D	D	L	W	L	D	L	W	W	L	L	D	D	W	L	W	L	W	W	W	W	W	D	D	W	D	W	W	W	W	D	D	D	D	D	W	W	D	L	L	L	W	W	W
Position	4	9	10	11	15	11	15	16	17	14	11	14	15	17	17	15	16	12	14	12	11	9	8	8	7	7	7	7	6	4	4	4	4	4	4	4	4	4	4	4	4	4	5	4	4	4

Source: InTheMadCrowd
A = Away; H = Home; W = Win; D = Draw; L = Loss

==== Results ====
12 August 2000 1	Lincoln City	0–2	Hartlepool United	Lincoln
15:00		Report	Fitzpatrick 20', 90'	Stadium: Sincil Bank; Attendance: 3,588; Referee: Paul Danson

19 August 2000 2	Hartlepool United	1–2	Chesterfield	Hartlepool
15:00	Henderson 2'	Report	Tutill 8'; Willis 78'	Stadium: Victoria Park; Attendance: 3,583; Referee: Trevor Jones

26 August 2000 3	Exeter City	1–1	Hartlepool United	Exeter
15:00	Roberts 79'	Report	Henderson 1'	Stadium: St James Park; Attendance: 2,967; Referee: Clive Wilkes

28 August 2000 4	Hartlepool United	0–0	Cheltenham Town	Hartlepool
15:00		Report		Stadium: Victoria Park; Attendance: 2,870; Referee: Phil Richards

2 September 2000 5	Hartlepool United	1–3	Shrewsbury Town	Hartlepool
15:00	Lormor 75'	Report	Jemson 24', 60' (pen.); Brown 90'	Stadium: Victoria Park; Attendance: 2,710; Referee: Mike Pike

9 September 2000 6	Blackpool	1–2	Hartlepool United	Blackpool
15:00	Morrison 73'	Report	Miller 26'; Henderson 57'	Stadium: Bloomfield Road; Attendance: 4,562; Referee: Howard Webb

12 September 2000 7	Torquay United	1–0	Hartlepool United	Torquay
19:45	Williams 29'	Report		Stadium: Plainmoor; Attendance: 1,538; Referee: Dermot Gallagher

16 September 2000 8	Hartlepool United	2–2	Macclesfield Town	Hartlepool
15:00	Miller 48' (pen.); Shilton 58'	Report	Barker 76'; Glover 90' (pen.)	Stadium: Victoria Park; Attendance: 2,589; Referee: Tony Leake

23 September 2000 9	Mansfield Town	4–3	Hartlepool United	Mansfield
15:00	Greenacre 21', 84'; Boulding 82'; Corden 86'	Report	Shilton 45'; Lormor 74'; Henderson 78'	Stadium: Field Mill; Attendance: 2,135; Referee: Paul Taylor

30 September 2000 10	Hartlepool United	1–0	York City	Hartlepool
15:00	Henderson 33'	Report		Stadium: Victoria Park; Attendance: 2,130; Referee: Mark Cowburn

7 October 2000 11	Hartlepool United	2–1	Darlington	Hartlepool
15:00	Henderson 9'; Miller 66'	Report	Naylor 89'	Stadium: Victoria Park; Attendance: 3,265; Referee: Alan Butler

14 October 2000 12	Rochdale	2–1	Hartlepool United	Rochdale
15:00	Ford 17'; Jones 79' (pen.)	Report	Lormor 59'	Stadium: Spotland Stadium; Attendance: 2,813; Referee: Fraser Stretton

18 October 2000 13	Brighton & Hove Albion	4–2	Hartlepool United	Brighton
19:45	Hart 7'; Zamora 22', 68'; Carpenter 30'	Report	Kuipers 45' (o.g.); Sperrevik 48'	Stadium: Withdean Stadium; Attendance: 6,528; Referee: David Elleray

21 October 2000 14	Hartlepool United	1–1	Plymouth Argyle	Hartlepool
15:00	Henderson 22'	Report	Nancekivell 69'	Stadium: Victoria Park; Attendance: 2,581; Referee: Eddie Wolstenholme

24 October 2000 15	Hull City	0–0	Hartlepool United	Hull
19:45		Report		Stadium: Boothferry Park; Attendance: 5,294; Referee: Bill Burns

28 October 2000 16	Hartlepool United	2–1	Leyton Orient	Hartlepool
15:00	Miller 64'; Stephenson 78'	Report	Watts 90'	Stadium: Victoria Park; Attendance: 2,133; Referee: Matt Messias

4 November 2000 17	Scunthorpe United	3–0	Hartlepool United	Scunthorpe
15:00	Hodges 5', 49'; Ipoua 55'	Report		Stadium: Glanford Park; Attendance: 3,241; Referee: Tony Bates

11 November 2000 18	Hartlepool United	3–1	Kidderminster Harriers	Hartlepool
15:00	Westwood 50'; Midgley 58'; Miller 64'	Report	Durnin 36'	Stadium: Victoria Park; Attendance: 2,726; Referee: Uriah Rennie

25 November 2000 19	Cardiff City	3–2	Hartlepool United	Cardiff
15:00	Fortune-West 20'; Bonner 90'; Nogan 90'	Report	Henderson 17'; Miller 89'	Stadium: Ninian Park; Attendance: 6,251; Referee: Peter Rejer

2 December 2000 20	Hartlepool United	1–0	Southend United	Hartlepool
15:00	Miller 28' (pen.)	Report		Stadium: Victoria Park; Attendance: 2,638; Referee: Mark Warren

16 December 2000 21	Halifax Town	0–1	Hartlepool United	Halifax
19:45		Report	Midgley 71'	Stadium: The Shay; Attendance: 2,042; Referee: Scott Mathieson

23 December 2000 22	Hartlepool United	6–1	Barnet	Hartlepool
15:00	Stephenson 3'; Midgley 9', 38', 56'; Henderson 71'; Tinkler 77'	Report	Richards 86'	Stadium: Victoria Park; Attendance: 3,133; Referee: Roger Furnandiz

6 January 2001 23	Hartlepool United	2–0	Exeter City	Hartlepool
15:00	Miller 46', 67' (pen.)	Report		Stadium: Victoria Park; Attendance: 3,016; Referee: Alan Kaye

13 January 2001 24	Cheltenham Town	1–2	Hartlepool United	Cheltenham
15:00	Yates 44'	Report	Henderson 54'; Sharp 66'	Stadium: Whaddon Road; Attendance: 3,574; Referee: Mike Jones

16 January 2001 25	Chesterfield	0–0	Hartlepool United	Chesterfield
19:45		Report		Stadium: Saltergate; Attendance: 4,240; Referee: Lee Cable

20 January 2001 26	Hartlepool United	2–2	Carlisle United	Hartlepool
15:00	Midgley 46'; Arnison 54'	Report	Heggs 17'; Dobie 90'	Stadium: Victoria Park; Attendance: 4,473; Referee: Chris Foy

27 January 2001 27	Barnet	1–3	Hartlepool United	Edgware
15:00	Cottee 62'	Report	Henderson 17', 54'; Shilton 65'	Stadium: Underhill Stadium; Attendance: 2,565; Referee: Michael Ryan

3 February 2001 28	Shrewsbury Town	1–1	Hartlepool United	Shrewsbury
15:00	Aiston 14'	Report	Seabury 28' (o.g.)	Stadium: Gay Meadow; Attendance: 2,528; Referee: Phil Prosser

10 February 2001 29	Hartlepool United	3–1	Blackpool	Hartlepool
15:00	Henderson 27', 60'; Miller 70' (pen.)	Report	Ormerod 82'	Stadium: Victoria Park; Attendance: 3,973; Referee: David Laws

13 February 2001 30	Carlisle United	2–3	Hartlepool United	Carlisle
19:45	Galloway 19'; Stevens 30'	Report	Miller 60' (pen.); Fitzpatrick 74'; Shilton 81'	Stadium: Brunton Park; Attendance: 4,159; Referee: David Pugh

17 February 2001 31	Macclesfield Town	0–1	Hartlepool United	Macclesfield
15:00		Report	Tinkler 66'	Stadium: Moss Rose; Attendance: 2,228; Referee: Ray Olivier

20 February 2001 32	Hartlepool United	3–1	Torquay United	Hartlepool
19:45	Henderson 25'; Fitzpatrick 59'; Midgley 69'	Report	Hockley 87'	Stadium: Victoria Park; Attendance: 3,932; Referee: Mike Riley

24 February 2001 33	Hartlepool United	1–1	Mansfield Town	Hartlepool
15:00	Lormor 87'	Report	Blake 54'	Stadium: Victoria Park; Attendance: 3,699; Referee: Paul Robinson

3 March 2001 34	York City	1–1	Hartlepool United	York
15:00	McNiven 73'	Report	Henderson 9'	Stadium: Bootham Crescent; Attendance: 4,553; Referee: George Cain

6 March 2001 35	Hartlepool United	1–1	Rochdale	Hartlepool
19:45	Lormor 88'	Report	Lancashire 43'	Stadium: Victoria Park; Attendance: 3,492; Referee: Trevor Jones

10 March 2001 36	Darlington	1–1	Hartlepool United	Darlington
15:00	Naylor 37'	Report	Knowles 74'	Stadium: Feethams; Attendance: 6,107; Referee: Bill Burns

17 March 2001 37	Hartlepool United	2–2	Brighton & Hove Albion	Hartlepool
15:00	Lormor 46'; Henderson 57'	Report	Carpenter 37'; Zamora 56' (pen.)	Stadium: Victoria Park; Attendance: 4,410; Referee: Alan Kaye

24 March 2001 38	Plymouth Argyle	0–2	Hartlepool United	Plymouth
15:00		Report	Miller 28'; Lormor 43'	Stadium: Home Park; Attendance: 4,226; Referee: Mike North

27 March 2001 39	Hartlepool United	1–0	Lincoln City	Hartlepool
19:45	Miller 49'	Report		Stadium: Victoria Park; Attendance: 3,584; Referee: Roger Furnandiz

31 March 2001 40	Hartlepool United	1–1	Halifax Town	Hartlepool
15:00	Mawson 43' (o.g.)	Report	Proctor 40'	Stadium: Victoria Park; Attendance: 4,198; Referee: Brian Curson

7 April 2001 41	Southend United	2–1	Hartlepool United	Southend-on-Sea
15:00	Forbes 35'; Bramble 51'	Report	Tinkler 84'	Stadium: Roots Hall; Attendance: 3,759; Referee: Paul Armstrong

14 April 2001 42	Hartlepool United	0–1	Hull City	Hartlepool
15:00		Report	Eyre 68'	Stadium: Victoria Park; Attendance: 4,364; Referee: Mike Pike

16 April 2001 43	Leyton Orient	3–1	Hartlepool United	Leyton
15:00	Smith 8'; Watts 16'; Griffiths 17'	Report	Miller 78'	Stadium: Brisbane Road; Attendance: 5,359; Referee: Rob Styles

21 April 2001 44	Hartlepool United	1–0	Scunthorpe United	Hartlepool
15:00	Miller 8'	Report		Stadium: Victoria Park; Attendance: 3,897; Referee: Phil Joslin

28 April 2001 45	Kidderminster Harriers	0–1	Hartlepool United	Kidderminster
15:00		Report	Sharp 89'	Stadium: Aggborough Stadium; Attendance: 3,748; Referee: Phil Prosser

5 May 2001 46	Hartlepool United	3–1	Cardiff City	Hartlepool
15:00	Midgley 33'; Lormor 62'; Miller 83'	Report	Earnshaw 10'	Stadium: Victoria Park; Attendance: 5,324; Referee: Alan Butler

==== Play-offs ====
13 May 2001 Semi-final first leg	Blackpool	2–0	Hartlepool United	Blackpool
15:00	Ormerod 61', 78'	Report		Stadium: Bloomfield Road; Attendance: 5,720; Referee: Bill Burns

16 May 2001 Semi-final second leg	Hartlepool United	1–3	Blackpool	Hartlepool
19:45	Henderson 48'	Report	Ormerod 21', 68'; Hills 50'	Stadium: Victoria Park; Attendance: 5,836; Referee: Uriah Rennie

=== FA Cup ===
18 November 2000 First round	Scunthorpe United	3–1	Hartlepool United	Scunthorpe
15:00	Ipoua 38', 77', 88'	Report	Midgley 13'	Stadium: Glanford Park; Attendance: 3,552; Referee: Steve Bennett

=== League Cup ===
22 August 2000 First round first leg	Burnley	4–1	Hartlepool United	Burnley
19:45	Payton 63' (pen.), 69', 90'; Davis 87'	Report	Miller 37'	Stadium: Turf Moor; Attendance: 3,319; Referee: Alan Kaye

5 September 2000 First round second leg	Hartlepool United	3–2	Burnley	Hartlepool
19:45	Miller 30' (pen.); Fitzpatrick 38'; Stephenson 90'	Report	Cooke 18'; Payton 82'	Stadium: Victoria Park; Attendance: 1,090; Referee: Paul Robinson

=== Football League Trophy ===
11 December 2000 First round	Hartlepool United	3–2	Scunthorpe United	Hartlepool
19:45	Henderson 40'; Arnison 45'; Miller 51'	Report	Sheldon 30'; Quailey 86'	Stadium: Victoria Park; Attendance: 1,538; Referee: Colin Webster

9 January 2001 Second round	Hartlepool United	3–1	Doncaster Rovers	Hartlepool
19:45	Tinkler 29'; Clark 51'; Miller 54' (pen.)	Report	Campbell 49'	Stadium: Victoria Park; Attendance: 2,466; Referee: Graham Laws

30 January 2001 Third round	Lincoln City	1–0	Hartlepool United	Lincoln
19:45	Schofield 1'	Report		Stadium: Sincil Bank; Attendance: 1,357; Referee: Tony Leake

== Squad statistics ==
=== Appearances and goals ===
No.	Pos	Nat	Player	Total		Division Three		FA Cup		League Cup		Other	
No.	Pos	Nat	Player	Apps	Goals	Apps	Goals	Apps	Goals	Apps	Goals	Apps	Goals
1	GK	(Norway) NOR	Martin Hollund	6	0	5	0	0	0	1	0	0	0
2	DF	(England) ENG	Darren Knowles	29	1	25	1	0	0	2	0	2	0
3	MF	(England) ENG	Sam Shilton	38	4	33	4	1	0	2	0	2	0
4	DF	(England) ENG	Michael Barron	34	0	28	0	1	0	0	0	5	0
5	DF	(England) ENG	Gary Strodder	21	0	19	0	1	0	1	0	0	0
6	MF	(England) ENG	Lee Fitzpatrick	27	5	22	4	0	0	2	1	3	0
7	DF	(England) ENG	Paul Arnison	32	2	27	1	1	0	1	0	3	1
8	MF	(England) ENG	Tommy Miller	54	20	46	16	1	0	2	2	5	2
9	FW	(England) ENG	Tony Lormor	38	8	32	8	0	0	1	0	5	0
10	FW	(Norway) NOR	Tim Sperrevik	16	1	14	1	1	0	1	0	0	0
11	MF	(England) ENG	Ian Clark	29	1	24	0	1	0	0	0	4	1
12	FW	(England) ENG	Craig Midgley	47	9	41	8	1	1	1	0	4	0
13	DF	(England) ENG	James Sharp	41	2	34	2	0	0	2	0	5	0
14	FW	(England) ENG	Kevin Henderson	48	19	40	17	1	0	2	0	5	2
15	MF	(Norway) NOR	Thomas Tennebø	4	0	2	0	0	0	2	0	0	0
16	DF	(England) ENG	Chris Westwood	54	1	46	1	1	0	2	0	5	0
17	MF	(England) ENG	Paul Stephenson	48	3	40	2	1	0	2	1	5	0
18	DF	(England) ENG	Graeme Lee	8	0	6	0	0	0	0	0	2	0
19	MF	(England) ENG	Andy McAvoy	5	0	5	0	0	0	0	0	0	0
20	FW	(England) ENG	Adam Boyd	6	0	5	0	1	0	0	0	0	0
21	DF	(England) ENG	Mark Robinson	7	0	6	0	0	0	1	0	0	0
23	GK	(Wales) WAL	Anthony Williams	48	0	41	0	1	0	1	0	5	0
24	DF	(Republic of Ireland) IRL	Barry Ferguson	5	0	4	0	0	0	1	0	0	0
26	DF	(England) ENG	Steve Baker	9	0	9	0	0	0	0	0	0	0
26	FW	(Wales) WAL	Jermaine Easter	6	0	4	0	0	0	0	0	2	0
27	MF	(England) ENG	Mark Tinkler	33	4	28	3	0	0	0	0	5	1
29	DF	(England) ENG	Neil Aspin	11	0	10	0	0	0	0	0	1	0

=== Goalscorers ===
Rank	Name	Division Three	FA Cup	League Cup	Other	Total
1	Tommy Miller	16	0	2	2	20
2	Kevin Henderson	17	0	0	2	19
3	Craig Midgley	8	1	0	0	9
4	Tony Lormor	8	0	0	0	8
5	Lee Fitzpatrick	4	0	1	0	5
6	Sam Shilton	4	0	0	0	4
6	Mark Tinkler	3	0	0	1	4
7	Paul Stephenson	2	0	1	0	3
8	Paul Arnison	1	0	0	1	2
8	James Sharp	2	0	0	0	2
9	Ian Clark	0	0	0	1	1
9	Darren Knowles	1	0	0	0	1
9	Tim Sperrevik	1	0	0	0	1
9	Chris Westwood	1	0	0	0	1

=== Clean Sheets ===
Rank	Name	Division Three	FA Cup	League Cup	Other	Total
1	Anthony Williams	11	0	0	0	11
2	Martin Hollund	2	0	0	0	2
