= 1999–2000 Hartlepool United F.C. season =

Hartlepool United
1999–00 season
- Owner: IOR
- Chairman: Ken Hodcroft
- Manager: Chris Turner
- Stadium: Victoria Park
- Division Three: 7th
- FA Cup: Second round (Eliminated by Hereford United)
- Football League Cup: First round (Eliminated by Crewe Alexandra)
- Football League Trophy: Third round (Eliminated by Carlisle United)
- Top goalscorer: League: Tommy Miller (14); All: Tommy Miller (16)
- Highest home attendance: 6,995 (vs Darlington)
- Lowest home attendance: 1,482 (vs Halifax Town)
Home colours

During the 1999–2000 English football season, Hartlepool United Football Club competed in the Football League Third Division where they finished in 7th position on 72 points and qualified for the play-offs but lost to local rivals Darlington in the semi-final.

== Players ==
As of End of Season.

=== First-team squad ===
Note: Flags indicate national team as defined under FIFA eligibility rules; some limited exceptions apply. Players may hold more than one non-FIFA nationality.

No.	Pos.	Nation	Player
1	GK	NOR	Martin Hollund
2	DF	ENG	Darren Knowles
3	FW	ENG	Paul Beavers
4	DF	ENG	Michael Barron
5	DF	ENG	Gary Strodder
6	DF	ENG	Denny Ingram
7	DF	ENG	Paul Arnison
8	MF	ENG	Tommy Miller
9	FW	ENG	Gary Jones
10	FW	ENG	Chris Freestone
11	MF	ENG	Ian Clark
12	FW	ENG	Craig Midgley
13	GK	WAL	Andy Dibble
14	FW	ENG	Kevin Henderson
15	MF	WAL	Danny Hughes
16	DF	ENG	Chris Westwood
17	MF	ENG	Paul Stephenson
18	DF	ENG	Graeme Lee

No.	Pos.	Nation	Player
19	FW	ENG	Michael Dunwell
20	DF	ENG	Craig Lake
21	DF	ENG	Paul Cooper
22	DF	ENG	Glen Downey
23	GK	ENG	Gareth Downey
24	MF	WAL	Nicky Evans
25	DF	ENG	Mark Robinson
26	FW	ENG	Andy Hay
27	MF	ENG	James Coppinger
28	DF	ENG	Richard Forster
29	MF	NOR	Thomas Tennebø
30	FW	ENG	Adam Boyd
31	MF	ENG	Sam Shilton
32	MF	ENG	Lee Fitzpatrick
34	FW	ENG	Colin West
35	MF	ENG	Andy McAvoy
36	GK	ENG	Jim Provett

== Results ==
=== Division Three ===
==== Results summary ====
Overall								Home						Away					
Pld	W	D	L	GF	GA	GD	Pts	W	D	L	GF	GA	GD	W	D	L	GF	GA	GD
46	21	9	16	60	49	+11	72	16	1	6	32	17	+15	5	8	10	28	32	−4

==== Results by matchday ====
Round	1	2	3	4	5	6	7	8	9	10	11	12	13	14	15	16	17	18	19	20	21	22	23	24	25	26	27	28	29	30	31	32	33	34	35	36	37	38	39	40	41	42	43	44	45	46
Ground	A	H	A	H	A	H	A	H	A	H	H	A	A	H	H	A	H	A	A	H	H	A	H	A	H	A	A	H	A	H	A	H	A	H	H	A	H	A	A	H	A	H	H	A	H	A
Result	L	L	W	L	D	L	L	W	L	W	W	W	L	W	W	L	W	D	D	W	L	W	W	W	W	L	D	W	L	W	L	L	D	W	D	D	W	D	L	W	L	W	W	D	L	W
Position	13	22	15	18	18	19	23	19	22	20	14	13	16	16	12	13	12	12	13	9	10	9	6	5	5	5	5	5	5	5	6	8	8	7	7	7	6	7	8	8	8	8	7	7	8	7

Source: InTheMadCrowd
A = Away; H = Home; W = Win; D = Draw; L = Loss

Match	Date	Opponent	Venue	Result	Attendance	Scorers
1	7 August 1999	Peterborough United	A	1–2	5,886	Jones 39'
2	14 August 1999	Halifax Town	H	0–2	2,719	
3	21 August 1999	Carlisle United	A	3–0	4,033	Freestone 3', 52', Miller 58'
4	28 August 1999	Cheltenham Town	H	0–1	2,390	
5	31 August 1999	Shrewsbury Town	A	0–0	1,803	
6	4 September 1999	Southend United	H	1–2	1,980	Stephenson 46'
7	11 September 1999	Northampton Town	A	1–2	4,724	Miller 24'
8	18 September 1999	Plymouth Argyle	H	3–0	2,242	Freestone 4', Lee 13', Henderson 88'
9	25 September 1999	Leyton Orient	A	1–2	3,889	Stephenson 14'
10	2 October 1999	Darlington	H	2–0	3,957	Shilton 46', Fitzpatrick 68'
11	9 October 1999	Hull City	H	2–0	3,114	Miller 50', Freestone 90'
12	16 October 1999	Mansfield Town	A	3–2	2,612	Shilton 14', Stephenson 51', Miller 59'
13	19 October 1999	Rotherham United	A	0–3	3,340	
14	23 October 1999	Leyton Orient	H	1–0	2,397	Henderson 49'
15	2 November 1999	Barnet	H	3–0	2,290	Miller 27', 47', 85'
16	6 November 1999	Brighton & Hove Albion	A	0–1	5,746	
17	13 November 1999	Chester City	H	1–0	2,266	Miller 35'
18	23 November 1999	Torquay United	A	0–0	2,280	
19	27 November 1999	Macclesfield Town	A	3–3	2,351	Clark 47', 90', Lee 84'
20	4 December 1999	Peterborough United	H	1–0	2,404	Jones 20'
21	11 December 1999	Swansea City	H	0–1	2,397	
22	18 December 1999	Exeter City	A	2–1	2,261	Jones 31', 78'
23	26 December 1999	York City	H	2–1	4,668	Henderson 31', 73'
24	28 December 1999	Lincoln City	A	2–1	3,480	Clark 9', Miller 53'
25	3 January 2000	Rochdale	H	3–2	4,498	Miller 5' (pen), Jones 46', Clark 56'
26	8 January 2000	Swansea City	A	1–2	7,163	Henderson 40'
27	15 January 2000	Halifax Town	A	1–1	3,546	Jones 24'
28	22 January 2000	Carlisle United	H	1–0	3,530	Miller 53'
29	29 January 2000	Cheltenham Town	A	1–2	3,630	Lee 86'
30	5 February 2000	Shrewsbury Town	H	1–0	2,933	Boyd 90'
31	12 February 2000	Southend United	A	1–2	3,337	Lee 45'
32	19 February 2000	Macclesfield Town	H	1–4	2,823	Miller 39'
33	26 February 2000	Plymouth Argyle	A	1–1	3,917	Shilton 59'
34	4 March 2000	Northampton Town	H	2–1	2,878	Stephenson 6', Lee 29'
35	7 March 2000	Brighton & Hove Albion	H	0–0	2,734	
36	11 March 2000	Barnet	A	1–1	2,925	Coppinger 73'
37	18 March 2000	Torquay United	H	2–0	2,766	Stephenson 10', Lee 77'
38	21 March 2000	Chester City	A	1–1	1,816	Fitzpatrick 78'
39	25 March 2000	York City	A	1–2	4,079	Coppinger 53'
40	1 April 2000	Exeter City	H	2–1	2,668	Arnison 62', Clark 63'
41	8 April 2000	Rochdale	A	0–2	2,332	
42	15 April 2000	Lincoln City	H	2–0	2,777	Henderson 6', Miller 39'
43	22 April 2000	Mansfield Town	H	1–0	3,473	Henderson 55'
44	24 April 2000	Darlington	A	1–1	6,749	Miller 45'
45	29 April 2000	Rotherham United	H	1–2	4,673	Clark 21'
46	6 May 2000	Hull City	A	3–0	7,620	Lee 2', Coppinger 8', Henderson 37'

=== Football League Division Three play-offs ===
Round	Date	Opponent	Venue	Result	Attendance	Scorers
Semi final 1st Leg	13 May 2000	Darlington	H	0–2	6,995	
Semi final 2nd Leg	17 May 2000	Darlington	A	0–1	8,238	

=== League Cup ===
Round	Date	Opponent	Venue	Result	Attendance	Scorers
R1 1st Leg	10 August 1999	Crewe Alexandra	H	3–3	1,836	Miller 3', Di Lella 48', Stephenson 60'
R1 2nd Leg	24 August 1999	Crewe Alexandra	A	0–1	5,095	

=== FA Cup ===
Round	Date	Opponent	Venue	Result	Attendance	Scorers
R1	31 October 1999	Millwall	H	1–0	2,847	Jones 90'
R2	21 November 1999	Hereford United	A	0–1	4,914	

=== Football League Trophy ===
Round	Date	Opponent	Venue	Result	Attendance	Scorers
R1	7 December 1999	Halifax Town	H	1–0	1,484	Henderson 14'
R2	10 January 2000	Preston North End	A	2–1	3,635	Midgley 83', Miller 86'
Quarter final	22 February 2000	Carlisle United	H	1–2	2,399	Lee 85'

== Squad ==
Appearances for competitive matches only

Pos.	Name	League		FA Cup		League Cup		Other		Total	
Pos.	Name	Apps	Goals	Apps	Goals	Apps	Goals	Apps	Goals	Apps	Goals
DF	(England) Paul Arnison	5(3)	1	0	0	0	0	2	0	7(3)	1
DF	(England) Michael Barron	40	0	2	0	2	0	5	0	49	0
FW	(England) Paul Beavers	2(5)	0	0	0	0	0	1	0	3(5)	0
FW	(England) Adam Boyd	0(4)	1	0	0	0	0	0(2)	0	0(6)	1
MF	(England) Ian Clark	34(10)	6	1(1)	0	1	0	3(1)	0	39(12)	6
MF	(England) James Coppinger	6(4)	3	0	0	0	0	0	0	6(4)	3
MF	(Argentina) Gustavo Di Lella	3	0	0	0	1(1)	1	0	0	4(1)	1
GK	(England) Andy Dibble	6	0	0	0	2	0	2(1)	0	10(1)	0
MF	(England) Lee Fitzpatrick	16(8)	2	0	0	0	0	1(1)	0	17(8)	2
FW	(England) Chris Freestone	15(12)	4	2	0	2	0	3	0	22(12)	4
FW	(England) Kevin Henderson	23(12)	8	0(1)	0	0(1)	0	1	1	24(14)	8
GK	(Norway) Martin Hollund	40	0	2	0	0	0	3	0	45	0
DF	(England) Denny Ingram	6(1)	0	0	0	1(1)	0	0	0	7(2)	0
FW	(England) Gary Jones	30(3)	6	2	1	2	0	2(2)	0	38(5)	7
DF	(England) Darren Knowles	43(1)	0	2	0	2	0	3	0	50(1)	0
DF	(England) Graeme Lee	38	7	2	0	2	0	4	1	46	8
MF	(Scotland) Gary Mason	5(1)	0	1	0	0	0	1	0	7(1)	0
MF	(England) Andy McAvoy	5(11)	0	0	0	0	0	1(2)	0	6(13)	0
MF	(England) Craig Midgley	2(15)	0	0	0	0(1)	0	2(1)	1	4(17)	1
MF	(England) Tommy Miller	44	14	2	0	2	1	4	1	52	16
MF	(England) Chris Perkins	7(1)	0	0	0	1	0	0	0	8(1)	0
MF	(England) Sam Shilton	16(5)	3	2	0	0	0	2	0	20(5)	3
MF	(England) Paul Stephenson	46	5	1(1)	0	2(1)	1	5	0	54(2)	6
DF	(England) Gary Strodder	28(1)	0	0	0	1	0	3	0	32(1)	0
MF	(Norway) Thomas Tennebø	6(5)	0	0	0	1	0	1	0	8(5)	0
DF	(Norway) Rune Vindheim	7	0	1	0	0	0	0	0	8	0
FW	(England) Colin West	0(1)	0	0	0	0	0	0	0	0(1)	0
DF	(England) Chris Westwood	33(4)	0	2	0	0	0	5	0	40(4)	0

== See also ==
- 1999–2000 in English football
