= 2001–02 Hartlepool United F.C. season =

Hartlepool United
2001–02 season
- Owner: IOR
- Chairman: Ken Hodcroft
- Manager: Chris Turner
- Stadium: Victoria Park
- Division Three: 7th
- FA Cup: First round (Eliminated by Swindon Town)
- Football League Cup: First round (Eliminated by Nottingham Forest)
- Football League Trophy: First round (Eliminated by Bury)
- Top goalscorer: League: Gordon Watson (18); All: Gordon Watson (18)
- Highest home attendance: 7,135 (vs Cheltenham Town)
- Lowest home attendance: 2,190 (vs Bury)
- Average home league attendance: 3,566
- Biggest win: 7–1 (vs. Swansea City)
- Biggest defeat: 3–0 (vs. Cheltenham Town and Mansfield Town)

The 2001–02 season was Hartlepool United's 95th year in existence. Along with competing in Division Three, the club also participated in the FA Cup, League Cup and League Trophy. The season covers the period from 1 July 2001 to 30 June 2002.

== Players ==
As of End of Season.

=== First-team squad ===
Note: Flags indicate national team as defined under FIFA eligibility rules; some limited exceptions apply. Players may hold more than one non-FIFA nationality.

No.	Pos.	Nation	Player
1	GK	WAL	Anthony Williams
2	DF	ENG	Paul Arnison
3	DF	ENG	Mark Robinson
4	DF	ENG	Michael Barron
5	DF	ENG	Graeme Lee
6	DF	ENG	Chris Westwood
7	MF	ENG	Mark Tinkler
8	MF	ENG	Ritchie Humphreys
9	FW	ENG	Tony Lormor
10	FW	ENG	Kevin Henderson
11	FW	WAL	Eifion Williams
12	FW	WAL	Jermaine Easter

No.	Pos.	Nation	Player
14	MF	ENG	Tommy Widdrington
15	DF	ENG	Jon Bass
16	MF	ENG	Darrell Clarke
17	MF	ENG	Paul Stephenson
18	DF	NIR	Gordon Simms
19	FW	ENG	Adam Boyd
20	DF	ENG	James Sharp
21	GK	NOR	Martin Hollund
23	FW	ENG	Gordon Watson
24	MF	ENG	James Coppinger
25	MF	ENG	Antony Sweeney
26	MF	ENG	Paul Smith

== Results ==
=== Pre-season friendlies ===
14 July 2001	Blyth Spartans	1–1	Hartlepool United	Blyth
15:00		Report	McKenzie 3'	Stadium: Croft Park

18 July 2001	Billingham Town	0–4	Hartlepool United	Billingham
19:00		Report	Lormor 15'; Stephenson 30'; Clark 36'; Henderson 86'	Stadium: Bedford Terrace

21 July 2001	Fana	1–1	Hartlepool United	Bergen
15:00		Report	Lormor 65'	Stadium: Fana Stadion; Referee: Arne Anderson

=== Division Three ===
==== League table ====
Pos	Team	Pld	W	D	L	GF	GA	GD	Pts	Qualification or relegation
5	Rochdale	46	21	15	10	65	52	+13	78	Qualification for the Third Division play-offs
6	Rushden & Diamonds	46	20	13	13	69	53	+16	73	Qualification for the Third Division play-offs
7	Hartlepool United	46	20	11	15	74	48	+26	71	Qualification for the Third Division play-offs
8	Scunthorpe United	46	19	14	13	74	56	+18	71	
9	Shrewsbury Town	46	20	10	16	64	53	+11	70	

Rules for classification: 1) Points; 2) Goal difference; 3) Goals scored

==== Results summary ====
Overall								Home						Away					
Pld	W	D	L	GF	GA	GD	Pts	W	D	L	GF	GA	GD	W	D	L	GF	GA	GD
46	20	11	15	74	48	+26	71	12	6	5	53	23	+30	8	5	10	21	25	−4

==== Results by matchday ====
Round	1	2	3	4	5	6	7	8	9	10	11	12	13	14	15	16	17	18	19	20	21	22	23	24	25	26	27	28	29	30	31	32	33	34	35	36	37	38	39	40	41	42	43	44	45	46
Ground	H	A	H	A	A	A	H	H	A	H	A	H	A	A	H	A	H	H	H	A	H	H	A	H	H	A	H	H	A	H	A	A	A	H	A	A	H	H	A	A	H	A	H	A	H	A
Result	D	W	L	L	L	D	L	D	L	W	L	W	L	W	L	L	W	W	W	W	D	L	D	W	D	L	W	W	D	W	W	L	D	W	L	L	D	D	D	W	L	W	W	W	W	W
Position	12	3	13	17	20	21	23	23	23	22	22	23	24	20	21	24	20	15	13	8	9	12	12	12	13	13	12	12	11	11	10	10	10	10	10	11	11	11	11	10	10	10	9	9	8	7

Source: InTheMadCrowd
A = Away; H = Home; W = Win; D = Draw; L = Loss

==== Results ====
11 August 2001 1	Hartlepool United	1–1	Mansfield Town	Hartlepool
15:00	Clark 78'	Report	Greenacre 8'	Stadium: Victoria Park; Attendance: 3,534; Referee: Graham Salisbury

18 August 2001 2	Shrewsbury Town	1–3	Hartlepool United	Shrewsbury
15:00	Rodgers 40'	Report	Clark 61' (pen.); Henderson 66'; Tinkler 76'	Stadium: Gay Meadow; Attendance: 2,783; Referee: Joe Ross

25 August 2001 3	Hartlepool United	1–2	Darlington	Hartlepool
15:00	Tinkler 15'	Report	Atkinson 35'; Mellanby 42'	Stadium: Victoria Park; Attendance: 4,842; Referee: Neale Barry

27 August 2001 4	Leyton Orient	2–0	Hartlepool United	Leyton
15:00	Ibehre 45'; Houghton 90'	Report		Stadium: Brisbane Road; Attendance: 3,719; Referee: Mark Cooper

8 September 2001 5	Scunthorpe United	1–0	Hartlepool United	Scunthorpe
15:00	Torpey 29'	Report		Stadium: Glanford Park; Attendance: 3,206; Referee: Alan Butler

15 September 2001 6	Southend United	0–0	Hartlepool United	Southend-on-Sea
15:00		Report		Stadium: Roots Hall; Attendance: 3,933; Referee: Paul Armstrong

18 September 2001 7	Hartlepool United	0–1	Cheltenham Town	Hartlepool
19:45		Report	Devaney 78'	Stadium: Victoria Park; Attendance: 2,599; Referee: Mike Pike

22 September 2001 8	Hartlepool United	1–1	Kidderminster Harriers	Hartlepool
15:00	Watson 54'	Report	Blake 57'	Stadium: Victoria Park; Attendance: 3,130; Referee: Scott Mathieson

25 September 2001 9	Lincoln City	2–0	Hartlepool United	Lincoln
19:45	Thorpe 37'; Holmes 66' (pen.)	Report		Stadium: Sincil Bank; Attendance: 2,306; Referee: Michael Ryan

29 September 2001 10	Hartlepool United	3–1	Carlisle United	Hartlepool
15:00	Tinkler 34'; Watson 66'; Boyd 88'	Report	Hews 4'	Stadium: Victoria Park; Attendance: 3,854; Referee: Phil Joslin

5 October 2001 11	Rushden & Diamonds	2–1	Hartlepool United	Irthlingborough
19:45	Barron 30' (o.g.); Hunter 67'	Report	Watson 45'	Stadium: Nene Park; Attendance: 3,929; Referee: Clive Penton

13 October 2001 12	Hartlepool United	3–0	York City	Hartlepool
15:00	Tinkler 39'; Boyd 47', 64'	Report		Stadium: Victoria Park; Attendance: 3,603; Referee: Tony Bates

20 October 2001 13	Torquay United	1–0	Hartlepool United	Torquay
15:00	Graham 79'	Report		Stadium: Plainmoor; Attendance: 2,148; Referee: Grant Hegley

23 October 2001 14	Macclesfield Town	0–1	Hartlepool United	Macclesfield
19:45		Report	Boyd 77'	Stadium: Moss Rose; Attendance: 1,356; Referee: Paul Danson

27 October 2001 15	Hartlepool United	0–1	Oxford United	Hartlepool
15:00		Report	Moody 48'	Stadium: Victoria Park; Attendance: 3,595; Referee: Steve Baines

3 November 2001 16	Plymouth Argyle	1–0	Hartlepool United	Plymouth
15:00	Friio 41'	Report		Stadium: Home Park; Attendance: 5,723; Referee: Bill Jordan

6 November 2001 17	Hartlepool United	4–0	Hull City	Hartlepool
19:45	Watson 33', 40', 90'; Barron 84'	Report		Stadium: Victoria Park; Attendance: 3,183; Referee: Peter Jones

10 November 2001 18	Hartlepool United	2–0	Exeter City	Hartlepool
15:00	Watson 49'; Lormor 90'	Report		Stadium: Victoria Park; Attendance: 3,222; Referee: Roger Furnandiz

20 November 2001 19	Hartlepool United	3–0	Halifax Town	Hartlepool
19:45	Watson 35'; Tinkler 60'; Widdrington 65'	Report		Stadium: Victoria Park; Attendance: 2,963; Referee: Phil Richards

23 November 2001 20	Swansea City	0–1	Hartlepool United	Swansea
19:45		Report	Lee 20'	Stadium: Vetch Field; Attendance: 4,161; Referee: Peter Walton

30 November 2001 21	Hartlepool United	1–1	Rochdale	Hartlepool
19:45	Bass 74'	Report	Oliver 59'	Stadium: Victoria Park; Attendance: 4,162; Referee: Steve Baines

8 December 2001 22	Hartlepool United	1–2	Luton Town	Hartlepool
15:00	Humphreys 64'	Report	Crowe 30'; Taylor 45'	Stadium: Victoria Park; Attendance: 3,585; Referee: Tony Leake

22 December 2001 23	Luton Town	2–2	Hartlepool United	Luton
15:00	Howard 35'; Johnson 84'	Report	Clarke 45', 59'	Stadium: Kenilworth Road; Attendance: 6,739; Referee: George Cain

29 December 2001 24	Hartlepool United	3–1	Leyton Orient	Hartlepool
15:00	Watson 4'; Smith 37'; Tinkler 86'	Report	Harris 75'	Stadium: Victoria Park; Attendance: 3,832; Referee: Howard Webb

12 January 2002 25	Hartlepool United	2–2	Shrewsbury Town	Hartlepool
15:00	Watson 26'; Lee 89'	Report	Murray 57'; Rodgers 78'	Stadium: Victoria Park; Attendance: 3,447; Referee: Peter Rejer

19 January 2002 26	Mansfield Town	3–0	Hartlepool United	Mansfield
15:00	Lee 3' (o.g.); Corden 78'; Greenacre 90'	Report		Stadium: Field Mill; Attendance: 4,349; Referee: Trevor Parkes

26 January 2002 27	Hartlepool United	5–1	Rushden & Diamonds	Hartlepool
15:00	Watson 29', 64'; Humphreys 62'; Widdrington 69'; Coppinger 78'	Report	Duffy 90'	Stadium: Victoria Park; Attendance: 3,513; Referee: Michael Ryan

29 January 2002 28	Hartlepool United	3–2	Scunthorpe United	Hartlepool
19:45	Tinkler 12'; Watson 77'; Smith 82'	Report	Beagrie 28', 66' (pen.)	Stadium: Victoria Park; Attendance: 3,294; Referee: Mike Pike

5 February 2002 29	Hull City	1–1	Hartlepool United	Hull
19:45	Williams 6'	Report	Boyd 90'	Stadium: Boothferry Park; Attendance: 8,419; Referee: Fraser Stretton

9 February 2002 30	Hartlepool United	4–1	Torquay United	Hartlepool
15:00	Boyd 13', 14'; Lee 20'; Easter 65'	Report	Brandon 73'	Stadium: Victoria Park; Attendance: 3,658; Referee: Brian Curson

12 February 2002 31	Bristol Rovers	0–1	Hartlepool United	Bristol
15:00		Report	Boyd 19'	Stadium: Memorial Stadium; Attendance: 6,482; Referee: Phil Prosser

16 February 2002 32	York City	1–0	Hartlepool United	York
15:00	Nogan 68'	Report		Stadium: Bootham Crescent; Attendance: 4,823; Referee: Scott Mathieson

19 February 2002 33	Darlington	1–1	Hartlepool United	Darlington
19:45	Clark 37'	Report	Tinkler 59'	Stadium: Feethams; Attendance: 6,339; Referee: Graham Laws

23 February 2002 34	Hartlepool United	5–1	Southend United	Hartlepool
15:00	Humphreys 9', 66'; Coppinger 35'; Smith 69'; Easter 71'	Report	Belgrave 90'	Stadium: Victoria Park; Attendance: 3,609; Referee: Roger Furnandiz

26 February 2002 35	Cheltenham Town	3–0	Hartlepool United	Cheltenham
19:45	Naylor 41', 74'; Alsop 43'	Report		Stadium: Whaddon Road; Attendance: 3,257; Referee: David Crick

2 March 2002 36	Kidderminster Harriers	3–2	Hartlepool United	Kidderminster
15:00	Sall 58'; Larkin 64'; Bennett 87'	Report	Humphreys 4'; Tinkler 73'	Stadium: Aggborough Stadium; Attendance: 2,894; Referee: Phil Richards

5 March 2002 37	Hartlepool United	1–1	Lincoln City	Hartlepool
19:45	Clarke 77'	Report	Walker 54'	Stadium: Victoria Park; Attendance: 3,126; Referee: Graham Salisbury

9 March 2002 38	Hartlepool United	1–1	Bristol Rovers	Hartlepool
15:00	Watson 29'	Report	Ellington 64'	Stadium: Victoria Park; Attendance: 3,699; Referee: John Brandwood

16 March 2002 39	Rochdale	0–0	Hartlepool United	Rochdale
15:00		Report		Stadium: Spotland Stadium; Attendance: 3,219; Referee: Mark Cooper

19 March 2002 40	Carlisle United	0–2	Hartlepool United	Carlisle
19:45		Report	Lee 22'; Watson 68'	Stadium: Brunton Park; Attendance: 3,147; Referee: Mark Halsey

22 March 2002 41	Hartlepool United	1–2	Macclesfield Town	Hartlepool
19:45	Westwood 90'	Report	Tipton 33'; Lambert 62'	Stadium: Victoria Park; Attendance: 3,819; Referee: George Cain

30 March 2002 42	Oxford United	1–2	Hartlepool United	Oxford
15:00	Moody 33'	Report	Williams 12', 23'	Stadium: Kassam Stadium; Attendance: 5,767; Referee: Ray Olivier

1 April 2002 43	Hartlepool United	1–0	Plymouth Argyle	Hartlepool
15:00	Clarke 86'	Report		Stadium: Victoria Park; Attendance: 3,725; Referee: Mike Jones

6 April 2002 44	Halifax Town	0–2	Hartlepool United	Halifax
15:00		Report	Watson 9'; Lee 63'	Stadium: The Shay; Attendance: 1,838; Referee: Tony Bates

13 April 2002 45	Hartlepool United	7–1	Swansea City	Hartlepool
15:00	Clarke 20', 45', 65'; Williams 47'; Boyd 69'; Watson 75' (pen.); Henderson 77'	Report	Mumford 26'	Stadium: Victoria Park; Attendance: 4,033; Referee: Steve Baines

20 April 2002 46	Exeter City	0–2	Hartlepool United	Exeter
15:00		Report	Watson 9'; Williams 56'	Stadium: St James Park; Attendance: 3,595; Referee: Paul Armstrong

==== Play-offs ====
27 April 2002 Semi-final first leg	Hartlepool United	1–1	Cheltenham Town	Hartlepool
15:00	Williams 45'	Report	Grayson 89'	Stadium: Victoria Park; Attendance: 7,135; Referee: Mike Dean

30 April 2002 Semi-final second leg	Cheltenham Town	1–1 (a.e.t.) (5–4 p)	Hartlepool United	Cheltenham
19:45	Williams 26'	Report	Arnison 17'	Stadium: Whaddon Road; Attendance: 7,165; Referee: Andy Hall
	Penalties
	Grayson (penalty scored); Lee (penalty scored); Yates (penalty scored); Duff (penalty missed); Finnigan (penalty scored); Alsop (penalty scored)		Smith (penalty scored); Stephenson (penalty missed); Arnison (penalty scored); Henderson (penalty scored); Watson (penalty scored); Humphreys (penalty missed)

=== FA Cup ===
17 November 2001 First round	Swindon Town	3–1	Hartlepool United	Swindon
15:00	Ruddock 36' (pen.); Invincible 37'; Heywood 74'	Report	Clarke 39'	Stadium: County Ground; Attendance: 4,766; Referee: Paul Danson

=== League Cup ===
20 August 2001 First round	Hartlepool United	0–2	Nottingham Forest	Hartlepool
19:45		Report	John 33'; Bart-Williams 60'	Stadium: Victoria Park; Attendance: 3,938; Referee: Anthony Leake

=== Football League Trophy ===
16 October 2001 First round	Hartlepool United	0–1 (a.e.t.)	Bury	Hartlepool
19:45		Report	Newby 114'	Stadium: Victoria Park; Attendance: 2,190; Referee: Graeme Laws

== Squad statistics ==
=== Appearances and goals ===
No.	Pos	Nat	Player	Total		Division Three		FA Cup		League Cup		Other	
No.	Pos	Nat	Player	Apps	Goals	Apps	Goals	Apps	Goals	Apps	Goals	Apps	Goals
1	GK	(Wales) WAL	Anthony Williams	47	0	43	0	1	0	0	0	3	0
2	DF	(England) ENG	Paul Arnison	21	1	19	0	0	0	0	0	2	1
3	DF	(England) ENG	Mark Robinson	39	0	37	0	0	0	0	0	2	0
4	DF	(England) ENG	Michael Barron	44	1	39	1	1	0	1	0	3	0
5	DF	(England) ENG	Graeme Lee	44	5	39	5	1	0	1	0	3	0
6	DF	(England) ENG	Chris Westwood	39	1	35	1	1	0	1	0	2	0
7	MF	(England) ENG	Mark Tinkler	43	9	40	9	1	0	1	0	1	0
8	MF	(England) ENG	Ritchie Humphreys	51	5	46	5	1	0	1	0	3	0
9	FW	(England) ENG	Tony Lormor	18	1	17	1	0	0	1	0	0	0
10	FW	(England) ENG	Kevin Henderson	26	2	23	2	0	0	1	0	2	0
11	MF	(England) ENG	Ian Clark	8	2	7	2	0	0	1	0	0	0
11	FW	(Wales) WAL	Eifion Williams	10	5	8	4	0	0	0	0	2	1
12	FW	(Wales) WAL	Jermaine Easter	12	2	12	2	0	0	0	0	0	0
14	MF	(England) ENG	Tommy Widdrington	27	2	24	2	1	0	1	0	1	0
15	DF	(England) ENG	Jon Bass	22	1	20	1	1	0	1	0	0	0
16	MF	(England) ENG	Darrell Clarke	37	8	33	7	1	1	1	0	2	0
17	MF	(England) ENG	Paul Stephenson	32	0	29	0	0	0	1	0	2	0
18	DF	(Northern Ireland) NIR	Gordon Simms	11	0	10	0	1	0	0	0	0	0
19	FW	(England) ENG	Adam Boyd	31	9	29	9	0	0	0	0	2	0
20	DF	(England) ENG	James Sharp	16	0	15	0	0	0	0	0	1	0
21	GK	(Norway) NOR	Martin Hollund	4	0	3	0	0	0	1	0	0	0
23	FW	(England) ENG	Gordon Watson	36	18	32	18	1	0	1	0	2	0
24	MF	(England) ENG	Anthony Ormerod	2	0	2	0	0	0	0	0	0	0
24	MF	(England) ENG	James Coppinger	14	2	14	2	0	0	0	0	0	0
25	MF	(England) ENG	Antony Sweeney	2	0	2	0	0	0	0	0	0	0
26	MF	(England) ENG	Paul Smith	34	3	31	3	1	0	0	0	2	0
27	FW	(England) ENG	Jon Parkin	1	0	1	0	0	0	0	0	0	0

=== Goalscorers ===
Rank	Name	Division Three	FA Cup	League Cup	Other	Total
1	Gordon Watson	18	0	0	0	18
2	Adam Boyd	9	0	0	0	9
2	Mark Tinkler	9	0	0	0	9
3	Darrell Clarke	7	1	0	0	8
4	Ritchie Humphreys	5	0	0	0	5
4	Graeme Lee	5	0	0	0	5
4	Eifion Williams	4	0	0	1	5
5	Paul Smith	3	0	0	0	3
6	Ian Clark	2	0	0	0	2
6	James Coppinger	2	0	0	0	2
6	Jermaine Easter	2	0	0	0	2
6	Kevin Henderson	2	0	0	0	2
6	Tommy Widdrington	2	0	0	0	2
7	Paul Arnison	0	0	0	1	1
7	Michael Barron	1	0	0	0	1
7	Jon Bass	1	0	0	0	1
7	Tony Lormor	1	0	0	0	1
7	Chris Westwood	1	0	0	0	1

=== Clean Sheets ===
Rank	Name	Division Three	FA Cup	League Cup	Other	Total
1	Anthony Williams	13	0	0	0	13

=== Penalties ===
Date	Name	Opposition	Scored?
18 August 2001	Ian Clark	Shrewsbury Town	✓
8 September 2001	Tommy Widdrington	Scunthorpe United	✗
22 September 2001	Ian Clark	Kidderminster Harriers	✗
13 April 2002	Gordon Watson	Swansea City	✓
