= 2002–03 Hartlepool United F.C. season =

Hartlepool United
2002–03 season
- Owner: IOR
- Chairman: Ken Hodcroft
- Manager: Chris Turner (until 7 November); Mike Newell (from 21 November)
- Stadium: Victoria Park
- Division Three: 2nd
- FA Cup: First round (Eliminated by Southend United)
- Football League Cup: First round (Eliminated by Tranmere Rovers)
- Football League Trophy: First round (Eliminated by Tranmere Rovers
- Top goalscorer: League: Eifion Williams (15); All: Eifion Williams (16)
- Highest home attendance: 6,360 (vs Darlington)
- Lowest home attendance: 2,778 (vs Tranmere Rovers)
- Average home league attendance: 4,943
- Biggest win: 4–0 (vs. Swansea City)
- Biggest defeat: 5–0 (vs. Tranmere Rovers)

The 2002–03 season was Hartlepool United's 96th year in existence. Along with competing in Division Three, the club also participated in the FA Cup, League Cup and League Trophy. The season covers the period from 1 July 2002 to 30 June 2003.

== Players ==
As of End of Season.

=== First-team squad ===
Note: Flags indicate national team as defined under FIFA eligibility rules; some limited exceptions apply. Players may hold more than one non-FIFA nationality.

No.	Pos.	Nation	Player
1	GK	WAL	Anthony Williams
2	DF	ENG	Paul Arnison
3	DF	ENG	Mark Robinson
4	DF	ENG	Michael Barron
5	DF	ENG	Graeme Lee
6	DF	ENG	Chris Westwood
7	MF	ENG	Mark Tinkler
8	MF	ENG	Ritchie Humphreys
9	FW	WAL	Eifion Williams
10	FW	ENG	Gordon Watson
11	MF	ENG	Darrell Clarke
12	MF	ENG	Paul Smith
14	FW	ENG	Kevin Henderson

No.	Pos.	Nation	Player
15	MF	ENG	Tommy Widdrington
16	FW	ENG	Adam Boyd
17	MF	ENG	Paul Stephenson
18	DF	ENG	Jon Bass
19	FW	WAL	Jermaine Easter
20	DF	ENG	James Sharp
21	GK	ENG	Jim Provett
22	DF	NIR	Gordon Simms
23	MF	ENG	Antony Sweeney
24	MF	ENG	Brian Ross
25	MF	ENG	Matty Robson
26	FW	ENG	Marcus Richardson
28	MF	ENG	Steven Istead

== Results ==
=== Pre-season friendlies ===
9 July 2002	TSV Theole	0–12	Hartlepool United	Tiel
19:00		Report	Watson; Henderson; Boyd; Clarke; Humphreys	Stadium: Groenendaallaan 10

10 July 2002	SV Nootdorp	0–12	Hartlepool United	Nootdorp
19:00		Report	Easter; Boyd; Stephenson; Arnison; Bass; Simms	Stadium: Sportpark 's-Gravenhout

17 July 2002	Spennymoor United	0–0	Hartlepool United	Spennymoor
19:00		Report		Stadium: The Brewery Field

20 July 2002	Berwick Rangers	1–3	Hartlepool United	Berwick-upon-Tweed
15:00		Report	Watson 30', 72'; Henderson 58'	Stadium: Shielfield Park

23 July 2002	Seaham Red Star	1–2	Hartlepool United	Seaham
19:00		Report	Boyd (pen.); Stephenson	Stadium: Seaham Town Park

24 July 2002	Hartlepool United	0–1	Stockport County	Hartlepool
19:00		Report	Lee 20' (o.g.)	Stadium: Victoria Park; Referee: Roy Pearson

27 July 2002	Hartlepool United	0–1	Bradford City	Hartlepool
15:00		Report		Stadium: Victoria Park

29 July 2002	Hartlepool United	1–1	Newcastle United	Hartlepool
19:00	Easter	Report		Stadium: Victoria Park; Attendance: 3,334

31 July 2002	Hartlepool United	2–0	Barnsley	Hartlepool
19:00	Henderson 7'; Robson 11'	Report		Stadium: Victoria Park; Attendance: 931

3 August 2002	Scarborough	1–2	Hartlepool United	Scarborough
15:00		Report	Williams 47'; Lee 58'	Stadium: McCain Stadium

6 August 2002	Billingham Town	0–3	Hartlepool United	Billingham
19:00		Report	Robson 24'; Boyd 80'; Richards 87'	Stadium: Bedford Terrace

12 August 2002	Durham City	0–2	Hartlepool United	Durham
19:00		Report	Easter 25', 41'	Stadium: New Ferens Park

=== Division Three ===
==== League table ====
Pos	Team	Pld	W	D	L	GF	GA	GD	Pts	Promotion or relegation
1	Rushden & Diamonds (C, P)	46	24	15	7	73	47	+26	87	Promotion to Football League Second Division
2	Hartlepool United (P)	46	24	13	9	71	51	+20	85	Promotion to Football League Second Division
3	Wrexham (P)	46	23	15	8	84	50	+34	84	Promotion to Football League Second Division
4	Bournemouth (O, P)	46	20	14	12	60	48	+12	74	Qualification for the Third Division play-offs
5	Scunthorpe United	46	19	15	12	68	49	+19	72	Qualification for the Third Division play-offs

Rules for classification: In the Football League goals scored (GF) takes precedence over goal difference (GD).
(C) Champions; (O) Play-off winners; (P) Promoted

==== Results summary ====
Overall								Home						Away					
Pld	W	D	L	GF	GA	GD	Pts	W	D	L	GF	GA	GD	W	D	L	GF	GA	GD
46	24	13	9	71	51	+20	85	16	5	2	49	21	+28	8	8	7	22	30	−8

==== Results by matchday ====
Round	1	2	3	4	5	6	7	8	9	10	11	12	13	14	15	16	17	18	19	20	21	22	23	24	25	26	27	28	29	30	31	32	33	34	35	36	37	38	39	40	41	42	43	44	45	46
Ground	A	H	H	A	H	A	A	H	H	A	H	A	A	H	A	H	H	A	A	H	A	H	A	H	H	A	H	A	A	H	H	A	H	A	A	H	H	A	A	H	A	H	A	H	H	A
Result	W	W	L	D	W	W	D	W	W	D	L	W	L	W	W	W	D	W	W	W	L	D	L	W	W	W	W	W	D	W	W	D	W	D	L	D	W	L	L	D	D	W	L	D	W	D
Position	1	1	3	3	2	1	2	1	1	1	1	1	1	1	1	1	1	1	1	1	1	1	2	1	1	1	1	1	1	1	1	1	1	1	1	1	1	1	1	1	1	1	2	2	2	2

Source: InTheMadCrowd
A = Away; H = Home; W = Win; D = Draw; L = Loss

==== Results ====
10 August 2002 1	Carlisle United	1–3	Hartlepool United	Carlisle
15:00	Wake 80'	Report	Tinkler 44', 71'; Humphreys 47'	Stadium: Brunton Park; Attendance: 10,684; Referee: George Cain

13 August 2002 2	Hartlepool United	2–0	Boston United	Hartlepool
19:45	Watson 55', 77' (pen.)	Report		Stadium: Victoria Park; Attendance: 4,841; Referee: Graham Salisbury

17 August 2002 3	Hartlepool United	0–2	Macclesfield Town	Hartlepool
15:00		Report	Adams 85'; Whitaker 86'	Stadium: Victoria Park; Attendance: 4,684; Referee: Graham Laws

24 August 2002 4	Torquay United	1–1	Hartlepool United	Torquay
15:00	Richardson 51'	Report	Humphreys 47'	Stadium: Plainmoor; Attendance: 2,403; Referee: Steve Tomlin

26 August 2002 5	Hartlepool United	2–0	Hull City	Hartlepool
15:00	Williams 32'; Watson 63'	Report		Stadium: Victoria Park; Attendance: 4,236; Referee: Alan Kaye

31 August 2002 6	Oxford United	0–1	Hartlepool United	Oxford
15:00		Report	Watson 38'	Stadium: Kassam Stadium; Attendance: 4,768; Referee: Paul Armstrong

7 September 2002 7	Swansea City	2–2	Hartlepool United	Swansea
15:00	Cusack 28'; Wood 43' (pen.)	Report	Tinkler 14'; Watson 44'	Stadium: Vetch Field; Attendance: 3,370; Referee: Phil Crossley

14 September 2002 8	Hartlepool United	4–1	Darlington	Hartlepool
15:00	Williams 3', 35'; Humphreys 59'; Tinkler 83'	Report	Clark 27'	Stadium: Victoria Park; Attendance: 6,360; Referee: Brian Curson

17 September 2002 9	Hartlepool United	2–1	Lincoln City	Hartlepool
19:45	Boyd 62'; Williams 66'	Report	Mike 2'	Stadium: Victoria Park; Attendance: 4,248; Referee: Michael Ryan

21 September 2002 10	Bury	1–1	Hartlepool United	Bury
15:00	Abbott 20'	Report	Boyd 82'	Stadium: Gigg Lane; Attendance: 3,547; Referee: Steve Baines

28 September 2002 11	Hartlepool United	1–2	Rushden & Diamonds	Hartlepool
15:00	Boyd 31'	Report	Peters 48'; Hall 84'	Stadium: Victoria Park; Attendance: 5,502; Referee: Phil Dowd

5 October 2002 12	Shrewsbury Town	0–1	Hartlepool United	Shrewsbury
15:00		Report	Williams 55'	Stadium: Gay Meadow; Attendance: 3,142; Referee: Andy Penn

13 October 2002 13	Bournemouth	2–1	Hartlepool United	Bournemouth
17:00	Elliott 61'; Widdrington 85' (o.g.)	Report	Williams 17'	Stadium: Dean Court; Attendance: 5,998; Referee: Mike Thorpe

19 October 2002 14	Hartlepool United	4–3	Wrexham	Hartlepool
15:00	Tinkler 14', 41', 52'; Richardson 19'	Report	Jones 21'; Trundle 68'; Sam 88' (pen.)	Stadium: Victoria Park; Attendance: 4,506; Referee: Paul Robinson

25 October 2002 15	Southend United	0–1	Hartlepool United	Southend-on-Sea
19:45		Report	Williams 1'	Stadium: Roots Hall; Attendance: 5,168; Referee: Keith Hill

29 October 2002 16	Hartlepool United	2–0	Bristol Rovers	Hartlepool
19:45	Arnison 41'; Williams 64'	Report		Stadium: Victoria Park; Attendance: 3,889; Referee: Mike Jones

1 November 2002 17	Hartlepool United	0–0	York City	Hartlepool
19:45		Report		Stadium: Victoria Park; Attendance: 5,789; Referee: Scott Mathieson

9 November 2002 18	Exeter City	1–2	Hartlepool United	Exeter
15:00	Moor 49'	Report	Tinkler 63'; Richardson 66'	Stadium: St James Park; Attendance: 2,778; Referee: Trevor Parkes

23 November 2002 19	Leyton Orient	1–2	Hartlepool United	Leyton
15:00	Canham 69'	Report	Williams 26', 72'	Stadium: Brisbane Road; Attendance: 4,009; Referee: Clive Wilkes

30 November 2002 20	Hartlepool United	2–1	Kidderminster Harriers	Hartlepool
15:00	Humphreys 3'; Tinkler 15'	Report	Parrish 47'	Stadium: Victoria Park; Attendance: 4,296; Referee: Phil Prosser

14 December 2002 21	Rochdale	4–0	Hartlepool United	Rochdale
15:00	Platt 24'; McEvilly 43', 62'; Connor 56'	Report		Stadium: Spotland; Attendance: 3,059; Referee: Mike Pike

21 December 2002 22	Hartlepool United	2–2	Scunthorpe United	Hartlepool
15:00	McCombe 45' (o.g.); Henderson 89'	Report	Brough 25'; Carruthers 49'	Stadium: Victoria Park; Attendance: 4,089; Referee: Alan Kaye

26 December 2002 23	Hull City	2–0	Hartlepool United	Hull
15:00	Keates 21'; Green 75'	Report		Stadium: KC Stadium; Attendance: 22,319; Referee: Howard Webb

28 December 2002 24	Hartlepool United	3–0	Cambridge United	Hartlepool
15:00	Williams 45'; Tinkler 83'; Clarke 87' (pen.)	Report		Stadium: Victoria Park; Attendance: 4,805; Referee: Fraser Stretton

1 January 2003 25	Hartlepool United	2–1	Carlisle United	Hartlepool
15:00	Lee 50'; Williams 80'	Report	Burt 10'	Stadium: Victoria Park; Attendance: 5,071; Referee: Graham Laws

4 January 2003 26	Boston United	0–1	Hartlepool United	Boston
15:00		Report	Clarke 70'	Stadium: York Street; Attendance: 3,081; Referee: Joe Ross

18 January 2003 27	Hartlepool United	3–1	Oxford United	Hartlepool
15:00	Humphreys 24'; Richardson 43', 90'	Report	Barron 36' (o.g.)	Stadium: Victoria Park; Attendance: 5,049; Referee: Tony Bates

21 January 2003 28	Macclesfield Town	0–1	Hartlepool United	Macclesfield
19:45		Report	Williams 16'	Stadium: Moss Rose; Attendance: 1,576; Referee: Mike Fletcher

25 January 2003 29	Cambridge United	0–0	Hartlepool United	Cambridge
15:00		Report		Stadium: Abbey Stadium; Attendance: 4,543; Referee: Eddie Wolstenholme

1 February 2003 30	Hartlepool United	3–2	Torquay United	Hartlepool
15:00	Clarke 56', 69'; Richardson 79'	Report	Graham 8'; Gritton 58'	Stadium: Victoria Park; Attendance: 4,975; Referee: Graham Salisbury

8 February 2003 31	Hartlepool United	2–1	Exeter City	Hartlepool
15:00	Humphreys 79'; Boyd 80'	Report	Walker 83' (pen.)	Stadium: Victoria Park; Attendance: 5,058; Referee: Scott Mathieson

15 February 2003 32	York City	0–0	Hartlepool United	York
17:35		Report		Stadium: Bootham Crescent; Attendance: 5,953; Referee: Steve Baines

22 February 2003 33	Hartlepool United	4–0	Swansea City	Hartlepool
15:00	Humphreys 11', 40', 69'; Widdrington 72'	Report		Stadium: Victoria Park; Attendance: 4,486; Referee: Neale Barry

1 March 2003 34	Darlington	2–2	Hartlepool United	Darlington
15:00	Conlon 36'; Liddle 60'	Report	Boyd 48' (pen.); Clarke 53'	Stadium: Feethams; Attendance: 5,832; Referee: Michael Ryan

4 March 2003 35	Lincoln City	3–0	Hartlepool United	Lincoln
19:45	Pearce 14'; Gain 83'; Bloomer 88'	Report		Stadium: Sincil Bank; Attendance: 3,409; Referee: Phil Prosser

7 March 2003 36	Hartlepool United	0–0	Bury	Hartlepool
19:45		Report		Stadium: Victoria Park; Attendance: 5,734; Referee: Mark Cooper

15 March 2003 37	Hartlepool United	2–1	Southend United	Hartlepool
15:00	Humphreys 36', 49'	Report	Sutch 74'	Stadium: Victoria Park; Attendance: 4,868; Referee: Mark Cowburn

18 March 2003 38	Wrexham	2–0	Hartlepool United	Wrexham
19:45	Green 3', 66'	Report		Stadium: Racecourse Ground; Attendance: 4,658; Referee: Dermot Gallagher

22 March 2003 39	Bristol Rovers	1–0	Hartlepool United	Bristol
15:00	Hyde 7'	Report		Stadium: Memorial Stadium; Attendance: 6,557; Referee: Peter Walton

29 March 2003 40	Hartlepool United	0–0	Bournemouth	Hartlepool
15:00		Report		Stadium: Victoria Park; Attendance: 5,625; Referee: Mike Fletcher

5 April 2003 41	Kidderminster Harriers	2–2	Hartlepool United	Kidderminster
15:00	Henriksen 22'; Bishop 27'	Report	Clarke 63'; Williams 90'	Stadium: Aggborough Stadium; Attendance: 2,900; Referee: Carl Boyeson

12 April 2003 42	Hartlepool United	4–1	Leyton Orient	Hartlepool
15:00	Tinkler 10', 66' (pen.); Lee 61'; Clarke 90'	Report	Heald 63'	Stadium: Victoria Park; Attendance: 4,795; Referee: Eddie Evans

19 April 2003 43	Scunthorpe United	4–0	Hartlepool United	Scunthorpe
15:00	Hayes 32'; Carruthers 72', 82'; Calvo García 86'	Report		Stadium: Glanford Park; Attendance: 5,280; Referee: Mike Thorpe

21 April 2003 44	Hartlepool United	2–2	Rochdale	Hartlepool
15:00	Widdrington 42', 52'	Report	Grand 23'; McEvilly 45'	Stadium: Victoria Park; Attendance: 5,408; Referee: Steve Baines

26 April 2003 45	Hartlepool United	3–0	Shrewsbury Town	Hartlepool
15:00	Williams 36'; Tinkler 45'; Henderson 79'	Report		Stadium: Victoria Park; Attendance: 5,384; Referee: Lee Mason

3 May 2003 46	Rushden & Diamonds	1–1	Hartlepool United	Irthlingborough
15:00	Hall 29'	Report	Westwood 90'	Stadium: Nene Park; Attendance: 6,291; Referee: Lee Cable

=== FA Cup ===
16 November 2002 First round	Southend United	1–1	Hartlepool United	Southend-on-Sea
15:00	Lee 3' (o.g.)	Report	Barron 23'	Stadium: Roots Hall; Attendance: 4,894; Referee: Lee Cable

26 November 2002 replay	Hartlepool United	1–2	Southend United	Hartlepool
19:45	Richardson 63'	Report	Rankin 88'; Cort 89'	Stadium: Victoria Park; Attendance: 4,080; Referee: Howard Webb

=== League Cup ===
10 September 2002 First round	Hartlepool United	1–2	Tranmere Rovers	Hartlepool
19:45	Williams 79'	Report	Parkin 37'; Taylor 83'	Stadium: Victoria Park; Attendance: 2,778; Referee: Mark Clattenburg

=== Football League Trophy ===
22 October 2002 First round	Tranmere Rovers	5–0	Hartlepool United	Birkenhead
19:45	Harrison 32'; Jones 45', 75'; Roberts 68'; Taylor 79'	Report		Stadium: Prenton Park; Attendance: 3,387; Referee: Mark Warren

== Squad statistics ==
=== Appearances and goals ===
No.	Pos	Nat	Player	Total		Division Three		FA Cup		League Cup		Other	
No.	Pos	Nat	Player	Apps	Goals	Apps	Goals	Apps	Goals	Apps	Goals	Apps	Goals
1	GK	(Wales) WAL	Anthony Williams	49	0	46	0	2	0	1	0	0	0
2	DF	(England) ENG	Paul Arnison	23	1	19	1	2	0	1	0	1	0
3	DF	(England) ENG	Mark Robinson	39	0	38	0	0	0	1	0	0	0
4	DF	(England) ENG	Michael Barron	45	1	42	0	2	1	1	0	0	0
5	DF	(England) ENG	Graeme Lee	48	2	45	2	2	0	1	0	0	0
6	DF	(England) ENG	Chris Westwood	49	1	46	1	2	0	1	0	0	0
7	MF	(England) ENG	Mark Tinkler	48	13	45	13	2	0	1	0	0	0
8	MF	(England) ENG	Ritchie Humphreys	49	11	46	11	2	0	1	0	0	0
9	FW	(Wales) WAL	Eifion Williams	49	16	45	15	2	0	2	1	0	0
10	FW	(England) ENG	Gordon Watson	17	5	17	5	0	0	0	0	0	0
11	MF	(England) ENG	Darrell Clarke	47	7	45	7	1	0	1	0	0	0
12	MF	(England) ENG	Paul Smith	26	0	24	0	2	0	0	0	0	0
14	FW	(England) ENG	Kevin Henderson	32	2	30	2	0	0	1	0	1	0
15	MF	(England) ENG	Tommy Widdrington	34	3	32	3	1	0	0	0	1	0
16	FW	(England) ENG	Adam Boyd	25	5	22	5	1	0	1	0	1	0
18	DF	(England) ENG	Jon Bass	5	0	4	0	0	0	0	0	1	0
19	FW	(Wales) WAL	Jermaine Easter	9	0	8	0	0	0	0	0	1	0
20	DF	(England) ENG	James Sharp	1	0	0	0	0	0	0	0	1	0
21	GK	(England) ENG	Jim Provett	1	0	0	0	0	0	0	0	1	0
22	DF	(Northern Ireland) NIR	Gordon Simms	2	0	1	0	0	0	0	0	1	0
23	MF	(England) ENG	Antony Sweeney	5	0	4	0	0	0	0	0	1	0
25	DF	(England) ENG	Matty Robson	1	0	0	0	0	0	0	0	1	0
26	FW	(England) ENG	Marcus Richardson	26	6	24	5	2	1	0	0	0	0
27	MF	(England) ENG	Colin McKenzie	1	0	0	0	0	0	0	0	1	0
28	MF	(England) ENG	Steven Istead	7	0	6	0	1	0	0	0	0	0
29	MF	(Republic of Ireland) IRL	Brian Barry-Murphy	9	0	7	0	2	0	0	0	0	0

=== Goalscorers ===
Rank	Name	Division Three	FA Cup	League Cup	Other	Total
1	Eifion Williams	15	0	1	0	16
2	Mark Tinkler	13	0	0	0	13
3	Ritchie Humphreys	11	0	0	0	11
4	Darrell Clarke	7	0	0	0	7
5	Marcus Richardson	5	1	0	0	6
6	Adam Boyd	5	0	0	0	5
6	Gordon Watson	5	0	0	0	5
7	Tommy Widdrington	3	0	0	0	3
8	Kevin Henderson	2	0	0	0	2
8	Graeme Lee	2	0	0	0	2
9	Paul Arnison	1	0	0	0	1
9	Michael Barron	0	1	0	0	1
9	Chris Westwood	1	0	0	0	1

=== Clean Sheets ===
Rank	Name	Division Three	FA Cup	League Cup	Other	Total
1	Anthony Williams	16	0	0	0	16

=== Penalties ===
Date	Name	Opposition	Scored?
13 August 2002	Gordon Watson	Boston United	✓
28 December 2002	Darrell Clarke	Cambridge United	✓
1 March 2003	Adam Boyd	Darlington	✓
12 April 2003	Mark Tinkler	Leyton Orient	✓
