= Paul Arnison =

English footballer and coach

Personal information
- Full name: Paul Simon Arnison
- Date of birth: 18 September 1977 (age 49)
- Place of birth: Hartlepool, England
- Height: 1.78 m (5 ft 10 in)
- Position: Defensive midfielder

Youth career
- 1993–1998: Newcastle United

Senior career*
Years	Team	Apps	(Gls)
1998–2000	Newcastle United	0	(0)
2000	→ Hartlepool United (loan)	1	(0)
2000–2003	Hartlepool United	76	(3)
2003–2008	Carlisle United	120	(1)
2008–2009	Bradford City	27	(0)
2009–2012	Darlington	89	(3)
2012–2013	Celtic Nation		
2013–2015	Sunshine Coast	47	(1)
Total		360	(8)
- * Club domestic league appearances and goals

Paul Simon Arnison (born 18 September 1977) is an English former footballer who played as a defensive midfielder. He last played for National Premier League Queensland club Sunshine Coast FC, where he was also employed as a coach.

He is a former Newcastle United trainee, who has also played for his hometown club Hartlepool United, as well as Carlisle United, Bradford City, Darlington and Celtic Nation.

== Club career ==
=== Early career ===
Born in Hartlepool, Arnison started his career at Newcastle United, where failed to make an appearance. He joined his hometown club Hartlepool United firstly on loan, then after joining on a permanent basis he scored on his home debut at Victoria Park.

=== Hartlepool United ===
During the 2001–02 season, Arnison was limited to 19 league games, but helped Hartlepool to reach the play-off semi-finals. Arnison scored his first goal of the season during the play-off semi-final second leg against Cheltenham Town. However, after the result finished 2–2 on aggregate, Arnison and Hartlepool were knocked out on penalties. During the summer, Arnison signed a contract extension, along with fellow defender Chris Westwood and top goalscorer Gordon Watson, to stay at Hartlepool for another season. Arnison was offered another deal at the end of the following season by new boss Mike Newell after Pools had secured promotion to Division Two.

=== Carlisle United ===
However, after just over three years with Hartlepool, he joined Carlisle United in October 2003 on a three-month loan. He signed a full contract with Carlisle at the end of this loan deal but was relegated with Carlisle to the Conference National in his first season but managed to secure back-to-back promotions to see Carlisle playing their football in League One in 2006. Arnison played more than 100 league and cup games for Carlisle signing new contract extensions at the end of the 2004–05 and 2005–06 seasons. Just five months later, Arnison signed a further 12-month contract extension, keeping him at Carlisle until June 2008. He made the right back position his own, but he has competition at the right back position with David Raven joining Carlisle United. Arnison started in Carlisle's 2–1 first leg play-off victory over Leeds United on 12 May 2008. But he missed their second leg defeat three days later, and on 16 May 2008, Arnison was one of three players to be released by manager John Ward.

=== Bradford City ===
He earned interest for a number of clubs, before he signed a two-year contract at League Two side Bradford City on 18 June 2008. He was one of four Bradford players to make his debut on the opening day of the 2008–09 season against Notts County. Arnison made Bradford's first goal for Peter Thorne, was booked and was substituted in the second half, as Bradford won 2–1. Arnison started the first seven games of the season before he was substituted against AFC Bournemouth because of an injury; it was later diagnosed as a muscle tear, which gave TJ Moncur the chance to deputise at right back. He failed to win his place back in the team until he returned in December for a 2–1 defeat at Brentford.

During the summer of 2009, his manager Stuart McCall signed two new full backs, Simon Ramsden and Jonathan Bateson, leaving Arnison surplus to requirements at Bradford.

=== Darlington and non-league ===
Paul was asked to find a new club and had a trial with League Two rivals Darlington playing 40 minutes of a friendly against Sunderland. He played in another pre-season friendly, and along with fellow Bradford defender Mark Bower, he joined Darlington following his release from Bradford City. Darlington suffered financial difficulties during Arnison's time at the club and his contract was terminated on 16 January 2012, along with the rest of the playing squad and caretaker manager Craig Liddle. The following day, a rescue bid led to the reinstatement of many of the club's players including Arnison. At end of the season, Arnison left the club as Darlington were relegated to the Northern Football League and reformed as Darlington 1883.

During his time at Darlington, Arnison played a part in Darlington's 2011 FA Trophy victory.

Arnison dropped back into Non-league football, joining Celtic Nation during the 2012–13 close season break where he joined up with his former teammates Adam Boyd, Graeme Lee and Jeff Smith.

=== Emigration to Australia ===
Arnison left Celtic Nation in early January 2013 to emigrate to Australia, Arnison stated his intention to continue playing in Australia, with former teammate Michael Bridges helping him find a club in the minor leagues, where he became a player-coach for National Premier Leagues Queensland side Sunshine Coast. he later become manager of the team, but resigned one week out from the start of the 2016 season.

== Personal life ==
Arnison is married to Amanda, who works as a nurse practitioner and the couple have two sons; Harry and Alfie. Alfie previously captained Brisbane Roar FC Youth and currently plays in England for Blyth Spartans. He is related through marriage to the boxer Savannah Marshall.

== Career statistics ==
Appearances and goals by club, season and competition
Club	Season	League			FA Cup		League Cup		Other		Total	
Club	Season	Division	Apps	Goals	Apps	Goals	Apps	Goals	Apps	Goals	Apps	Goals
Hartlepool United	1999–2000	Division Three	8	1	0	0	0	0	2	0	10	1
Hartlepool United	2000–01	Division Three	27	1	1	0	1	0	3	1	32	2
Hartlepool United	2001–02	Division Three	19	0	0	0	0	0	2	1	21	1
Hartlepool United	2002–03	Division Three	19	1	2	0	1	0	1	0	23	1
Hartlepool United	2003–04	Division Two	4	0	0	0	0	0	0	0	4	0
Hartlepool United	Total		77	3	3	0	2	0	8	1	90	4
Carlisle United	2003–04	Division Three	26	1	0	0	0	0	1	0	27	1
Carlisle United	2004–05	Conference National	24	0	2	0	0	0	3	0	29	0
Carlisle United	2005–06	League Two	41	0	1	0	0	0	6	0	48	0
Carlisle United	2006–07	League One	12	0	0	0	2	0	0	0	14	0
Carlisle United	2007–08	League One	17	0	0	0	2	0	2	0	21	0
Carlisle United	Total		120	1	3	0	4	0	12	0	139	1
Bradford City	2008–09	League Two	27	0	0	0	1	0	0	0	28	0
Darlington	2009–10	League Two	18	1	0	0	1	0	2	0	21	1
Darlington	2010–11	Conference National	37	1	1	0	0	0	0	0	38	1
Darlington	2011–12	Conference National	34	1	0	0	0	0	0	0	34	1
Darlington	Total		89	3	1	0	1	0	2	0	93	3
Career total			313	7	7	0	8	0	22	1	350	8

== Honours ==
Hartlepool United

- Football League Third Division second-place promotion: 2002–03

Carlisle United

- Football League Two: 2005–06
- Football Conference play-offs: 2005
- Football League Trophy runner-up: 2005–06

Darlington

- FA Trophy: 2010–11
