= Adam Boyd =

English footballer (born 1982)

Personal information
- Full name: Adam Mark Boyd
- Date of birth: 25 May 1982 (age 44)
- Place of birth: Hartlepool, England
- Position: Striker

Youth career
- 1998–1999: Hartlepool United

Senior career*
| Years | Team | Apps | (Gls) |
| 1999–2006 | Hartlepool United | 147 | (53) |
| 2003–2004 | → Boston United (loan) | 10 | (3) |
| 2004 | → Boston United (loan) | 4 | (1) |
| 2006–2007 | Luton Town | 18 | (1) |
| 2007–2009 | Leyton Orient | 77 | (23) |
| 2009–2012 | Hartlepool United | 92 | (16) |
| 2012 | Celtic Nation | 5 | (0) |
| 2012–2013 | Lincoln City | 0 | (0) |
| 2013 | Spennymoor Town | 0 | (0) |
| 2013–2014 | Bishop Auckland | | |
| Total | | 353 | (97) |
- * Club domestic league appearances and goals

Adam Mark Boyd (born 25 May 1982) is an English former professional footballer who played as a striker.

During his studies at Hartlepool Manor School of Technology, he played for Hartlepool United, making his debut in 1999. Signing professional forms there, Boyd would have a short loan spell at Boston United in 2004. Boyd would then play an integral role on his return to Hartlepool including scoring 22 goals in League One during the 2004–05 season as the club narrowly missed out on promotion to the Championship. Boyd then moved to Luton Town in 2006 for a fee of £500,000, but struggled to settle at the Championship side and left a year later for Leyton Orient on a free transfer. After spending two seasons at Orient, he returned to Hartlepool United. However, his second spell at the club was not as successful as his first, and he was released in 2012. Afterwards, he had spells in non-League with Celtic Nation, Lincoln City, Spennymoor Town and Bishop Auckland.

== Early life and career ==
Born in Hartlepool in the North East of England, Boyd attended Grange Primary School, Hartlepool. There his football abilities were first spotted by the school's headmaster and PE coach, Brian Cross, who selected him to play for the under-11 team, despite only being seven years old. While at Grange Primary School, Boyd rarely missed a game for his school.

He then progressed through to Manor College of Technology and he was once again recognised as a football player by the school's headmaster, Alan White, a teacher who had previously taught Steve Harper and Paul Kitson. Boyd also played for five years with a Sunday League team called Hartlepool St. Francis, where he started off by playing in central defence and helped the team win several trophies in the Teesside Junior Alliance league. Boyd caught the eye of Middlesbrough who sent scouts to watch him and gave him a trial. However, they decided against signing him. Subsequently, he joined Hartlepool United instead, which was his favourite team alongside Manchester United. He had regularly watched Hartlepool United as a young boy with his father.

== Club career ==
=== Hartlepool United ===
While at Hartlepool's youth team he quickly impressed the coaching staff of Mick Smith and Billy Horner. Despite having been in the youth team only for a short amount of time, he was given a surprising last minute call up to the first team at only 16 years of age. Boyd eventually made his debut against Shrewsbury Town and was an immediate success after coming on a substitute and scoring a dramatic last minute goal from a tight angle in his debut game. However, Boyd's early promise quickly faded as the team relinquished him to the reserves and he struggled to make an impact. From the 1999 season to 2003, Boyd had started a total of 25 first team matches and made 38 substitution appearances. Despite being on the field often, Boyd only managed to score 15 goals.

Boyd's lack of first team appearances prompted the newly appointed Hartlepool manager Neale Cooper to loan him to Boston United to gain experience. During his time at Boston, Boyd won critical acclaim from Boston manager Neil Thompson and played a total of 14 matches scoring four goals before returning to Hartlepool. Boyd returned nine pounds overweight and looked set to leave Hartlepool United after angering Cooper. When asked about his weight gain, Boyd claimed that he had been eating more to build up his strength but when asked about gym work he said he had not started it yet. Boston looked set to make permanent deal for Boyd and made an offer for the striker. However, both teams failed to reach an agreement with Boston claiming that Hartlepool were asking far too much. It was rumoured that Hartlepool chairman, Ken Hodcroft, wanted a five figure sum, but Boston were only prepared to pay a four figure amount of around £5,000.

Boyd was a surprise inclusion in the team to face Stockport, and came on as a substitute after 45 minutes. The next game away at Grimsby Town saw Boyd get his first start of the season for Pools and score two goals. Boyd kept his place in the team and continued to score for the remainder of the season and notched an impressive 12 goals in 10 starts. Cooper noticed a change in Boyd's attitude and commitment to the club and made Boyd Hartlepool's first choice striker. Boyd was also rewarded for his end of season form by being named the Powerade League One Player of the Month and also received the Goalscorer of the Month award. A Football League spokesman described Boyd as "finally delivering on his undoubted promise".

The following season, Boyd became one of League One's top goalscorers and formed a strong partnership with fellow striker Joel Porter to help Hartlepool make the play-offs. He scored 29 goals in league and cup matches and became the club's highest goalscorer since Joe Allon in 1991. Arguably Boyd's best goal came against Sheffield Wednesday, on a cold, wet and windy Friday night at Victoria Park. With Hartlepool already 2–0 up, Boyd received the ball outside the box and faked his way past two players before curling a shot over Sheffield Wednesday goalkeeper David Lucas with the outside of his boot for his hat-trick. This goal earned him two awards, Hartlepool United's Goal of the Season 2005 and the North East Goal of the Season 2005. Boyd was also named Hartlepool United's Players' Player of the Year. Boyd ended the season strongly and scored a brace in the first leg of the play-off semi-final match against Tranmere Rovers. This helped to secure Hartlepool's place in the play-off finals for the first time to forge a reputation for his goalscoring exploits, which has won him admirers such as Alan Shearer. His teammates likened him to his childhood idol Dennis Bergkamp. As Boyd was acclaimed, his value went up to £1 million and he attracted the attention of FA Premier League clubs such as Newcastle United, Liverpool, Middlesbrough and Sunderland. However, Boyd remained in Hartlepool's club for the start of the 2005–06 campaign. Boyd started the season by scoring two goals in four starts, but later picked up a long-term injury against Yeovil Town after bruising his bone. To make matters worse, Boyd's injury treatment went badly as he contracted a blood infection, which resulted in him being ruled out for five months. Former manager Mike Newell, then of Luton Town, sought to take advantage of the effect that his injury had had on his value and made Hartlepool two offers thought to be of approximately £500,000 that the club quickly rejected. After finally returning to full training, Boyd struggled to overcome the effects of his injury and spent the majority of the time on the sidelines as the season drew to a close.

=== Luton Town ===
On 28 July 2006, Boyd signed a three-year contract with Luton Town after Hartlepool accepted a bid in the range of £500,000. Before leaving, Boyd thanked Hartlepool's coaches, managers and fans for helping him to develop and supporting him. He also thanked Chris Turner, Ken Hodcroft and Danny Wilson for allowing the transfer to happen so he could fulfil his ambitions. On his debut for Luton Town, he played a part in setting up Carlos Edwards' goal against Leicester City to make the game 2–0. Boyd's first goal for Luton Town came in a League Cup match against Bristol Rovers – the game finished 1–1 with Luton winning 5–3 on penalties. It appeared that Boyd was way behind the rest of the team in terms of fitness and match sharpness. However, Newell believed this was because Boyd has "had the best part of a year out of the game". Boyd scored his first League goal for Luton against Queens Park Rangers.

However, Boyd showed few signs of adapting to Championship football, leaving many Luton fans frustrated with Boyd's lack of form after such a big money move for a club of Luton's financial situation. Boyd ended an unhappy spell with the Hatters by being released from his contract, after Town were relegated to League One. Boyd spent one year at Luton Town, scoring only two goals in twenty-three first team games.

=== Leyton Orient ===
Boyd was signed by Leyton Orient on 24 July 2007 on a two-year deal, following his release from Luton. Boyd scored on his debut, a pre-season friendly against West Ham United with a 25-yard (23 m) volleyed lob over Robert Green. The match was testimonial to Orient manager Martin Ling, who signed Boyd on the same day as the match. He scored the opening goal on his league debut for Orient, along with Sean Thornton, against Southend United in a 2–1 win at Roots Hall. Boyd had talks with Huddersfield Town at the beginning of the January 2009 transfer window, however he failed to agree personal terms. He signed for Hartlepool United for his second spell with the club on 1 May 2009.

=== Return to Hartlepool United ===
After rejoining his home-town club in 2009 for a fee of £50,000, Boyd scored seven league goals in his first season back and he notched his first goal back on his debut after coming on as a substitute for Denis Behan in a first round League Cup win over Coventry on 12 August 2009, scoring against his former Hartlepool teammate Dimitrios Konstantopoulos, it was the only goal of the tie in Hartlepool's first ever visit at the Ricoh Arena. The win saw Hartlepool earn a home-time against Premier League side Burnley, where he scored the first goal of the game. However, the Clarets would go on to win 2–1 after extra time.

The next season saw Boyd score a disappointing three goals, but he signed a new one-year deal on reduced terms at the end of the season. In the 2011–12 season, he scored four goals in the first seven league games of the season which saw Hartlepool unbeaten leading to the club's record start to the season. Despite this, he was dropped by then manager Mick Wadsworth. He would go on to score three more goals for the club, his last being a cool finish in a 2–1 away to Bury. Boyd was released on 10 May 2012, along with nine other Hartlepool players, after spending 10 seasons with his home town club in two spells, which now sees him in the club's top 15 all time goalscorers and in the top 25 all time appearances.

=== Drop to non-League ===
After his release from Hartlepool, Boyd was linked with Bury and local Conference professional side Gateshead, the latter of whom made an offer for Boyd before he signed for Carlisle based Northern League side Celtic Nation. Celtic Nation during pre-season went on to bring in numerous ex-Football League players including Boyd's former teammates Paul Arnison, Jeff Smith and Graeme Lee.

He made his first appearance for Celtic Nation in 1–0 victory in an FA Cup Extra-Preliminary Round away to Billingham Synthonia. He left the club by 'mutual consent' after only three months having managed only a solitary goal during his brief stay – a volley to win the FA Cup tie against Dunston in September.

He subsequently joined Lincoln City on trial. After completion of the trial, he signed a deal with the club that was to run until the New Year, however, he would play only once for the club in an FA Trophy game against Tamworth before being released.

After training with the club for three weeks, on 25 January 2013 he joined Spennymoor Town on a non-contract basis. He marked his debut for the club by scoring a seventh-minute penalty as they defeated Billingham Synthonia 4–0 in the third round of the Durham Challenge Cup on 4 February 2013. His spell with the club was short, as he headed off for a trial with a club in the Philippines.

In July 2013, he signed for Bishop Auckland.

== Personal life ==
In 2005, Boyd was involved in an incident where he was forced to flee across a "posh estate" and suffered bruises and injuries to his feet. Boyd declined to take any legal action against his attacker, saying that he just wanted to "forget about it". Months before during Hartlepool's pre-season tour in the Netherlands, a streaker ran onto the pitch and danced in front of him.

In 2021, Boyd was working for DPD delivering parcels. Boyd enjoys attending Hartlepool matches and, during the 2020–21 season, provided guest commentary.

On 14 October 2024, Boyd was due to appear at Teesside Magistrates Court after being charged driving with excess alcohol in May 2024. However, his case was adjourned as he was in rehab. The hearing was moved to November 2024. On 8 November 2024, Boyd pleaded guilty at court and was banned from driving for 12 months. He was also fined £1,000, along with being ordered to pay a £400 victim surcharge and £85 court costs.

== Career statistics ==
Appearances and goals by club, season and competition
| Club | Season | League | | | FA Cup | | League Cup | | Other | | Total | |
| Club | Season | Division | Apps | Goals | Apps | Goals | Apps | Goals | Apps | Goals | Apps | Goals |
|---|---|---|---|---|---|---|---|---|---|---|---|---|
| Hartlepool United | 1999–2000 | Division Three | 4 | 1 | 0 | 0 | 0 | 0 | 2 | 0 | 6 | 1 |
| Hartlepool United | 2000–01 | Division Three | 5 | 0 | 1 | 0 | 0 | 0 | 0 | 0 | 6 | 0 |
| Hartlepool United | 2001–02 | Division Three | 30 | 9 | 0 | 0 | 0 | 0 | 2 | 0 | 32 | 9 |
| Hartlepool United | 2002–03 | Division Three | 22 | 5 | 1 | 0 | 1 | 0 | 1 | 0 | 25 | 5 |
| Hartlepool United | 2003–04 | Division Two | 20 | 12 | 0 | 0 | 0 | 0 | 3 | 0 | 23 | 12 |
| Hartlepool United | 2004–05 | League One | 45 | 22 | 6 | 3 | 2 | 1 | 6 | 3 | 59 | 29 |
| Hartlepool United | 2005–06 | League One | 21 | 4 | 0 | 0 | 1 | 0 | 0 | 0 | 22 | 4 |
| Hartlepool United | Total | | 147 | 53 | 8 | 3 | 4 | 1 | 14 | 3 | 173 | 60 |
| Boston United (loan) | 2003–04 | Division Three | 14 | 4 | 0 | 0 | 0 | 0 | 0 | 0 | 14 | 4 |
| Luton Town | 2006–07 | Championship | 18 | 1 | 2 | 0 | 3 | 1 | 0 | 0 | 23 | 2 |
| Leyton Orient | 2007–08 | League One | 44 | 14 | 2 | 2 | 2 | 1 | 1 | 0 | 49 | 17 |
| Leyton Orient | 2008–09 | League One | 33 | 9 | 3 | 0 | 1 | 1 | 2 | 2 | 39 | 12 |
| Leyton Orient | Total | | 77 | 23 | 5 | 2 | 3 | 2 | 3 | 2 | 88 | 29 |
| Hartlepool United | 2009–10 | League One | 40 | 7 | 1 | 0 | 2 | 2 | 0 | 0 | 43 | 9 |
| Hartlepool United | 2010–11 | League One | 19 | 3 | 1 | 0 | 2 | 1 | 0 | 0 | 22 | 4 |
| Hartlepool United | 2011–12 | League One | 33 | 6 | 1 | 0 | 1 | 0 | 1 | 0 | 36 | 6 |
| Hartlepool United | Total | | 92 | 16 | 3 | 0 | 5 | 3 | 1 | 0 | 103 | 19 |
| Celtic Nation | 2012–13 | Northern League Division One | 5 | 0 | 2 | 1 | 0 | 0 | 0 | 0 | 7 | 1 |
| Lincoln City | 2012–13 | Conference Premier | 0 | 0 | 0 | 0 | 0 | 0 | 1 | 0 | 1 | 0 |
| Spennymoor Town | 2012–13 | Northern League Division One | 0 | 0 | 0 | 0 | 0 | 0 | 2 | 1 | 2 | 1 |
| Career total | | | 353 | 97 | 20 | 6 | 15 | 7 | 21 | 6 | 409 | 116 |

== Honours ==
Hartlepool United

- Third Division runner-up: 2002–03

Individual

- North East Team of the Year: 2002–03
- Football League Second Division Player of the Month: April 2004
- Hartlepool United Player's Player of the Year: 2004–05
- Football League One Player of the Month: January 2005
- Hartlepool United Goal of the Season: 2004–05
- North East Goal of the Season: 2004–05
