= Michael Barron =

English footballer (born 1974)

Personal information
- Full name: Michael James Barron
- Date of birth: 22 December 1974 (age 51)
- Place of birth: Chester-le-Street, England
- Height: 5 ft 11 in (1.80 m)
- Position: Right-back

Youth career
- ?–1993: Middlesbrough

Senior career*
Years	Team	Apps	(Gls)
1993–1997	Middlesbrough	3	(0)
1996	→ Hartlepool United (loan)	16	(0)
1997–2008	Hartlepool United	309	(3)
Total		328	(3)

Managerial career
- 2011: Hartlepool United (Caretaker)
- 2012: Hartlepool United (caretaker)
- 2021: Blyth Spartans (caretaker)
- * Club domestic league appearances and goals

Michael James Barron (born 22 December 1974) is a former professional footballer and coach.

Barron started his football career at Middlesbrough and made three appearances for the club. He would spend time on loan with local club Hartlepool United before signing permanently there in 1997. Early in his Hartlepool career, Barron won back-to-back Player of the Year awards in 1997–98 and 1998–99. After the club suffered three consecutive play-off defeats, Barron won his first promotion with the club from the Third Division in 2002–03. After two unsuccessful play-off campaigns in the Second Division and then subsequently League One, Hartlepool were relegated back to the fourth tier. Nevertheless, Barron won his second promotion with the club the following year. At the end of the 2007–08 season, Barron retired from football having made 374 appearances for Hartlepool, the ninth highest total in the club's history.

In his final season as a player, Barron began his coaching career at Hartlepool at youth level. He later moved into first-team roles with the club as a first-team coach, assistant manager and also as a caretaker manager on two separate occasions before leaving the club in 2013. Following this, Barron worked as a teacher before returning to coaching as assistant manager at Blyth Spartans.

== Football career ==
=== Middlesbrough ===
Barron was born in Chester-le-Street, but started his career at Middlesbrough. Despite spending four years at the club, Barron only made three appearances and found his chances of breaking into the first team limited. Barron looked elsewhere for game time and he was allowed to go on loan to Hartlepool United. Barron made his debut for Hartlepool against Carlisle United and made 14 appearances during his loan spell. Middlesbrough then released Barron and he signed permanently for Hartlepool.

=== Hartlepool United ===
After his 3 months on loan at Pools, Barron was persuaded to sign permanently in 1997 under manager Mick Tait, Barron found a role in the middle of a back three, playing as a sweeper, and impressed with his cool and calm nature. He was voted Supporters' Player of the Year in both 1998 and 1999.

Barron moved to right-back under Chris Turner.

Barron was in the Hartlepool side that had three consecutive Football League Third Division play-off semi-final defeats. He was part of the promotion-winning side in 2002-03 but Pools were pipped to the league title by Rushden & Diamonds on the final day of the season. Hartlepool had to beat Rushden to win the title but could only draw.

After promotion, Barron led Pools to the play-offs the following season and he was stretchered off in the second half of the second leg of the semi-final at Bristol City. Pools went on to lose in injury time.

The following year, Pools went one better and Barron led out the Hartlepool team as captain in their League One play-off final in May 2005 against Sheffield Wednesday where a late equaliser eight minutes from time denied Pools their first ever promotion to the Championship, Hartlepool went on to lose in extra-time 4–2 in front of a crowd of 59,808 at the Millennium Stadium.

To celebrate 10 seasons with the club, a series of events were held such as a testimonial dinner with Bobby Robson as guest speaker. Barron could only attend the later stages of the dinner as he was involved in a reserve team match while trying to make his comeback from injury. A testimonial game, at Victoria Park against Leeds United which Hartlepool won 2–1, was also held. During his time on the sidelines, he became a regular special guest commentator on Pools World, the Hartlepool United audio commentary service. Barron signed a new contract in June 2007. He retired at the end of the 2007–08 season which saw Hartlepool finish 15th in League One. He made 374 appearances for Pools, ranked 9th in the all-time list for the club, scoring 4 times.

== Coaching career ==
During his final playing season with Hartlepool, Micky was a player-coach for the League One side as the youth team coach. He kept up this role before being the club's assistant manager to Mick Wadsworth whilst undertaking the role of reserve team coach; John Hewitson was then put in charge of Barron's previous role of youth team coach. He was appointed first-team coach under John Hughes, before he was sacked along with Hughes in May 2013 which allowed Colin Cooper and Craig Hignett to replace to pair later on that month.

He took on first-team duties as caretaker manager on 6 December 2011, following the sacking of previous manager Mick Wadsworth. He was in charge for three games, losing the first two and then beating Oldham Athletic 1–0, but reverted to his reserve team duties when Neale Cooper was appointed manager on 28 December 2011.

Cooper resigned as Hartlepool manager on 24 October 2012 with the club sitting bottom of League One leaving Barron in charge as caretaker manager until a new manager was appointed. He drew his first game in his second stint as caretaker manager 2–2 against Brentford courtesy of a late own goal, assisted by Ritchie Humphreys.

In September 2020, Barron became assistant manager to former teammate Michael Nelson at Blyth Spartans. Following Nelson's dismissal in November 2021, Barron took temporary charge of Blyth.

In August 2024, Barron took up a coaching role at the Park View Academy of Sport. His role is to coach the first-year students at who, as part of a partnership with the college, play for Chester-le-Street United U18s.

== Media career ==
Since May 2020, Barron co-hosts Switch of Play which is a podcast of interviews with former Hartlepool players, alongside the club's former media manager Mark Simpson.

From the start of the 2023–24 season, Barron began working as a co-commentator for BBC Radio Tees reporting on Hartlepool games.

== Personal life ==
Alongside his coaching, he works as a teacher.

In May 2024, Barron revealed that he had been diagnosed with heart failure.

== Career statistics ==
Appearances and goals by club, season and competition
Club	Season	League			FA Cup		League Cup		Other		Total	
Club	Season	Division	Apps	Goals	Apps	Goals	Apps	Goals	Apps	Goals	Apps	Goals
Middlesbrough	1993–94	First Division	2	0	0	0	1	0	0	0	3	0
Middlesbrough	1995–96	Premier League	1	0	0	0	0	0	0	0	1	0
Middlesbrough	Total		3	0	0	0	1	0	0	0	4	0
Hartlepool United	1996–97	Division Three	16	0	0	0	0	0	0	0	16	0
Hartlepool United	1997–98	Division Three	33	0	1	0	1	0	2 (Note: Appearance(s) in Football League Trophy)	0	37	0
Hartlepool United	1998–99	Division Three	38	1	1	0	2	0	3	0	44	1
Hartlepool United	1999–2000	Division Three	40	0	2	0	2	0	5 (Note: Three appearances in Football League Trophy, two appearances in Third Division play-offs)	0	49	0
Hartlepool United	2000–01	Division Three	28	0	1	0	0	0	5	0	34	0
Hartlepool United	2001–02	Division Three	39	1	1	0	1	0	3 (Note: One appearance in Football League Trophy, two appearances in Third Division play-offs)	0	44	1
Hartlepool United	2002–03	Division Three	42	0	2	1	1	0	0	0	45	1
Hartlepool United	2003–04	Division Two	32	1	3	0	2	0	3 (Note: One appearance in Football League Trophy, two appearances in Second Division play-offs)	0	40	1
Hartlepool United	2004–05	League One	13	0	1	0	0	0	5 (Note: Two appearances in Football League Trophy, three appearances in League One play-offs)	0	20	0
Hartlepool United	2005–06	League One	15	0	0	0	0	0	0	0	15	0
Hartlepool United	2006–07	League Two	29	0	2	0	0	0	0	0	31	0
Hartlepool United	Total		325	3	14	1	9	0	26	0	374	4
Career total			328	3	14	1	10	0	26	0	378	4

== Managerial statistics ==
Team	From	To	Record				
Team	From	To	G	W	D	L	Win %
Hartlepool United (caretaker)	6 December 2011	28 December 2011	5	1	0	4	20.00
Hartlepool United (caretaker)	24 October 2012	13 November 2012	4	0	1	3	0.00
Blyth Spartans (caretaker)	17 November 2021	29 November 2021	2	1	0	1	50.00
Total			11	2	1	8	18.18

== Honours ==
Hartlepool United

- Football League Third Division second-place promotion: 2002–03
- Football League Two second-place promotion: 2006–07

Individual

- Hartlepool United Player of the Year: 1997–98, 1998–99
