= Martin Hollund =

Norwegian footballer and coach (born 1974)

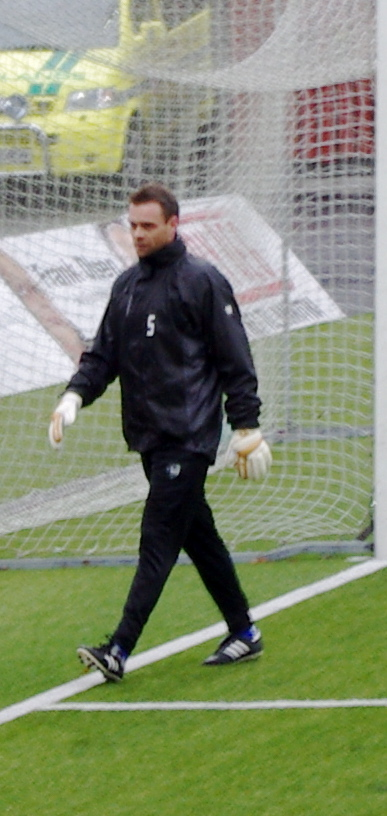
- Hollund pictured in October 2011

Personal information
- Full name: Martin Hollund
- Date of birth: 11 August 1974 (age 52)
- Place of birth: Stord Municipality, Norway
- Height: 1.83 m (6 ft 0 in)
- Position: Goalkeeper

Team information
- Current team: Fyllingsdalen (goalkeeper coach)

Youth career
- –1993: Bremnes

Senior career*
Years	Team	Apps	(Gls)
1993–1997	Brann	24	(0)
1997–2002	Hartlepool United	117	(0)
2002–2006	Løv-Ham		(0)
2010–2011	Løv-Ham	2	(0)

Managerial career
- 2007–2011: Løv-Ham (goalkeeper coach)
- 2012–: Fyllingsdalen (goalkeeper coach)
- * Club domestic league appearances and goals

Martin Hollund (born 11 August 1974) is a Norwegian former footballer who played as a goalkeeper. During his active career he played for Brann and Løv-Ham in Norway, and Hartlepool United in England. He has later worked as a goalkeeper coach for Løv-Ham and Fyllingdalen.

== Career ==
He hails from Bømlo Municipality. While playing for Brann, he was sold to Hartlepool United in 1997, playing 117 league games over five seasons. He retired from top-level football after the 2006 season. In 2007, he was a goalkeeper coach for Løv-Ham as well as a striker for Bremnes.

Even though he had retired from professional football, Hollund was on the bench for Løv-Ham in the 2010 season, and in the 2011 season he was Løv-Ham's third choice goalkeeper. On 3 October 2011 he made his first appearance for the club since he retired in 2006, when he came in as a substitute after Johan Thorbjørnsen was sent off. He also played the next match due to Thorbjørnsen's suspension and second-choice goalkeeper Harald Aksnes' injury.

After the merge of Løv-Ham and Fyllingen, Hollund continued as goalkeeper coach of Fyllingsdalen.

== Statistics ==
Season	Club	Division	League		Cup		League Cup		Other		Total	
Season	Club	Division	Apps	Goals	Apps	Goals	Apps	Goals	Apps	Goals	Apps	Goals
1993	Brann	Tippeligaen	0	0	0	0	–		–		0	0
1994	Brann	Tippeligaen	6	0	1	0	–		–		7	0
1995	Brann	Tippeligaen	15	0	3	0	–		–		18	0
1996	Brann	Tippeligaen	0	0	0	0	–		0	0	0	0
1997	Brann	Tippeligaen	3	0	1	0	–		0	0	4	0
Brann totals			24	0	5	0	—		0	0	29	0
1997–98	Hartlepool United	Division Three	28	0	0	0	0	0	2	0	30	0
1998–99	Hartlepool United	Division Three	41	0	2	0	2	0	3	0	48	0
1999–00	Hartlepool United	Division Three	40	0	2	0	0	0	3^{1}	0	45	0
2000–01	Hartlepool United	Division Three	5	0	0	0	1	0	0	0	6	0
2001–02	Hartlepool United	Division Three	3	0	0	0	1	0	0	0	4	0
Hartlepool totals			117	0	4	0	4	0	8	0	133	0
2002	Løv-Ham	2. divisjon			0	0	–		–		0	0
2003	Løv-Ham	2. divisjon			2	0	–		–		2	0
2004	Løv-Ham	2. divisjon			1	0	–		–		1	0
2005	Løv-Ham	Adeccoligaen	29	0	3	0	–		–		32	0
2006	Løv-Ham	Adeccoligaen	30	0	1(?)	0	–		–		31	0
2010	Løv-Ham	Adeccoligaen	0	0	0	0	–		–		0	0
2011	Løv-Ham	Adeccoligaen	2	0	0	0	–		–		2	0
Løv-Ham totals			61	0	7	0	—		—		68	0
Career total			202	0	16	0	4	0	8	0	230	0

^{1}Includes one Third Division play-off match.
