= Tim Henrik Sperrevik =

Norwegian footballer (born 1976)

Tim Sperrevik
Personal information
- Full name: Tim Henrik Sperrevik
- Date of birth: 2 March 1976 (age 50)
- Place of birth: Norway
- Position: Forward

Senior career*
Years	Team	Apps	(Gls)
19xx–1999	Os TF		
1999	Florø SK		
1999	Ny-Krohnborg IL		
1999–2000	SW Bregenz	1	(0)
1999–2000	Fana IL		
2000	Hartlepool United	14	(1)
2001	→ Fana IL (loan)		
2002–2011	Os TF		

Managerial career
- Os TF
- * Club domestic league appearances and goals

Tim Sperrevik (born 2 March 1976) is a Norwegian retired footballer. He used to work making boats.

== England ==
Taken to Hartlepool United on trial after the Pools 2000/01 Norway camp, Sperrevik impressed coach Chris Turner, who eventually presented him with a two-year contract despite being unfit and slightly corpulent upon arrival. Debuting at Exeter City on the 26th of August, the Norwegian missed Hartlepool's November trip to Scunthorpe United through suspension, posting 14 appearances total before returning to Fana on loan. However, he did not see out the remainder of his contract so that he could stay in Norway.

Asked about the standard of English football, Sperrevik replied that it was more faster and physical.
