= Gustavo Di Lella =

Argentine footballer (born 1973)

Personal information
- Full name: Gustavo Martin Di Lella
- Date of birth: 6 October 1973 (age 53)
- Place of birth: Buenos Aires, Argentina
- Height: 1.75 m (5 ft 9 in)
- Position: Midfielder

Senior career*
Years	Team	Apps	(Gls)
- All Boys
- Granada
1997	Blyth Spartans		
1997–1998	Darlington	5	(0)
1998–2000	Hartlepool United	31	(4)
2000–2001	Durham City		
2001–2002	Scarborough	4	(0)
- * Club domestic league appearances and goals

Gustavo Martin Di Lella (born 6 October 1973) is an Argentinian former footballer and football manager who played in The Football League for Darlington, Hartlepool United and Scarborough. Before playing in England, Di Lella played in Argentina's second division for All Boys and in Spain for Granada in the Segunda División B. In 2005 he joined Northern Irish side Larne ahead of the 2005–06 Irish Premier League. He set up two goals and scored a further one in a 5–1 win against Kilmore Rec in the 2005–06 County Antrim Shield.

As a manager, he took charge of non-league side Horden Colliery Welfare in 2007, although he was sacked in November of that year.
