= Danny Mellanby =

English footballer

Personal information
- Full name: Daniel Mellanby
- Date of birth: 17 July 1979 (age 47)
- Place of birth: Bishop Auckland, England
- Height: 5 ft 10 in (1.78 m)
- Position: Striker

Team information
- Current team: Northallerton Town

Senior career*
Years	Team	Apps	(Gls)
2000–2001	Bishop Auckland		
2001–2004	Darlington	44	(9)
2007–2012	Newton Aycliffe	28	(4)
2012	Darlington	0	(0)
2012–20??	Newton Aycliffe		
- * Club domestic league appearances and goals as of 12:58, 25 July 2008 (UTC)

Daniel Mellanby (born 17 August 1979) is an English former professional football striker who last played for Newton Aycliffe. He has previously played for Bishop Auckland and Darlington.

He played 44 league games scoring nine times in three years for the Quakers between the years of 2001–2004 he also played for the Bishops for a year between the year of 2000–2001. He now has jobs doing plumbing and steelworks. Whilst Bishop Auckland he was a member of Alan Oliver's Crook Town side which reached the FA Vase quarter-finals in 2006, Mellanby, who also served under Oliver at West Auckland, hit 15 goals in 50 Northern League appearances for the Newtonians.

In June 2012 he rejoined Darlington, however on 25 June 2012 his registration was changed to the new club Darlington 1883. in September 2012 he returned to Newton Aycliffe. On 12 January 2015, Mellanby was appointed manager of Northern League Div 2 Club Northallerton Town after being appointed assistant in Nov 2014.
