= Chris Westwood =

English footballer (born 1977)

Personal information
- Full name: Christopher John Westwood
- Date of birth: 13 February 1977 (age 49)
- Place of birth: Dudley, England
- Position: Defender

Senior career*
Years	Team	Apps	(Gls)
1995–1998	Wolverhampton Wanderers	4	(1)
1998–1999	Reading	0	(0)
1999–2005	Hartlepool United	251	(7)
2005–2007	Walsall	69	(5)
2007–2009	Peterborough United	53	(0)
2009	→ Cheltenham Town (loan)	9	(2)
2009–2011	Wycombe Wanderers	55	(3)
2011–2013	Wrexham	50	(2)
2013–2014	Alfreton Town	26	(2)
2014–2015	Hednesford Town	18	(1)
2015–2017	Halesowen Town	6	(0)
Total		541	(23)
- * Club domestic league appearances and goals

Christopher John Westwood (born 13 February 1977) is an English former professional footballer.

== Career ==
=== Wolverhampton Wanderers ===
Westwood began his career at Wolverhampton Wanderers as a youth trainee, making his league debut for Wolves in September 1997. He scored once for the club against Portsmouth in December 1997. He was released by Wolves at the end of the 1997–98 season having made four league appearances for the club.

=== Reading ===
Westwood moved to Reading in 1998 but first team chances at both clubs were limited and in his one season with the Berkshire club he did not make a senior league appearance.

=== Hartlepool United ===
On 24 March 1999, Westwood signed for Third Division side Hartlepool United from Telford United on a free transfer. Hartlepool's manager Chris Turner had previously coached Westwood whilst at Wolves. He made only four appearances for the club during the 1998–99 season before managing to establish himself as an essential member of the squad in the coming seasons. During the 1999–2000 season, he formed a strong partnership with fellow centre-back Graeme Lee, making 33 league appearances as Hartlepool reached the play-offs. For the five following seasons, Westwood missed only 21 league matches as Hartlepool earned a promotion to the Second Division in 2002–03 and reached the play-offs on two further occasions. His performances during Hartlepool's 2002–03 campaign earned him an inclusion in the PFA Team of the Year for the Third Division. His final game for the club came in the 2005 League One play-off final against Sheffield Wednesday. With Hartlepool leading 2–1 late into the match, Westwood conceded a penalty and subsequently received a red card for the foul. Hartlepool would go on to lose the match 4–2 after extra time. Over the course of seven seasons at Victoria Park, Westwood made 294 appearances in all competitions, scoring nine goals.

=== Walsall ===
He rejected a new deal at Hartlepool at the end of the 2004–05 season due to family reasons; returning to the West Midlands with Walsall on 1 July 2005. Westwood helped Walsall to promotion in the 2006–07 season; winning the League Two title by one point ahead of former club Hartlepool. His performances earned him an inclusion in the PFA Team of the Year for a second time..

=== Peterborough United ===
Westwood was signed by Peterborough United from Walsall on a three-year deal on 14 May 2007, and aided in the team's back-to-back promotions to League One and the Championship.

=== Cheltenham Town (loan) ===
On 6 January 2009, Westwood moved on an initial one-month loan to Cheltenham Town, which was later extended for a further month. Following Peterborough's promotion to the Championship, Westwood was placed on the transfer list.

=== Wycombe Wanderers ===
On 9 July 2009, Westwood signed a two-year contract with League One side Wycombe Wanderers after his contract with Peterborough was cancelled.

=== Wrexham ===
Westwood left Wycombe in June 2011 after rejecting their offer of a new contract and signed for Wrexham on a two-year deal. Westwood scored his first goal for Wrexham in a 2–2 draw against Grimsby Town. In March 2013 Westwood made his first appearance at Wembley Stadium in the FA Trophy Final which he won with Wrexham, beating Grimsby Town on penalties after the match ended 1–1, Westwood successfully converted a penalty in the shoot out. On 21 April Westwood was awarded the Wrexham player of the year award for the 2012–13 season.

On 13 May 2013, it was confirmed that Westwood would not be offered a new contract for the 2013–14 season.

=== Alfreton Town ===
Westwood join fellow Conference National side Alfreton Town on 5 July 2013, signing a one-year contract. He made his debut on the opening day of the season in a 1–0 defeat away to Dartford.

=== Hednesford Town ===
Westwood joined Hednesford Town in September 2014, making his debut against Stockport County FC on 6 September.

=== Halesowen Town ===
Westwood joined Evo Slik Northern Premier League side Halesowen Town in August 2015.

== Career statistics ==
Appearances and goals by club, season and competition
Club	Season	League			FA Cup		League Cup		Other		Total	
Club	Season	Division	Apps	Goals	Apps	Goals	Apps	Goals	Apps	Goals	Apps	Goals
Wolverhampton Wanderers	1997–98	Division One	4	1	0	0	2	0	0	0	6	1
Hartlepool United	1998–99	Division Three	5	0	0	0	0	0	0	0	5	0
Hartlepool United	1999–2000	Division Three	37	0	1	0	0	0	5	0	43	0
Hartlepool United	2000–01	Division Three	46	1	1	0	2	0	5	0	54	1
Hartlepool United	2001–02	Division Three	35	1	1	0	1	0	2	0	39	1
Hartlepool United	2002–03	Division Three	46	1	2	0	1	0	0	0	49	1
Hartlepool United	2003–04	Division Two	45	0	3	0	2	0	3	0	53	0
Hartlepool United	2004–05	League One	37	4	6	2	2	0	5	0	50	6
Hartlepool United	Total		251	7	14	2	8	0	20	0	293	9
Walsall	2005–06	League One	29	3	2	0	1	0	2	0	34	3
Walsall	2006–07	League Two	40	2	0	0	2	0	0	0	42	2
Walsall	Total		69	5	2	0	3	0	2	0	76	5
Peterborough United	2007–08	League Two	37	0	2	0	2	0	2	0	43	0
Peterborough United	2008–09	League One	16	0	1	0	1	0	0	0	18	0
Peterborough United	Total		53	0	3	0	3	0	2	0	61	0
Cheltenham Town (loan)	2008–09	League One	9	2	0	0	0	0	0	0	9	2
Wycombe Wanderers	2009–10	League One	28	2	1	0	1	0	1	0	31	2
Wycombe Wanderers	2010–11	League Two	27	1	3	0	0	0	1	0	31	1
Wycombe Wanderers	Total		55	3	4	0	1	0	2	0	62	3
Wrexham	2011–12	Conference Premier	14	1	1	0	0	0	1	0	16	1
Wrexham	2012–13	Conference Premier	36	1	2	0	0	0	5	1	43	2
Wrexham	Total		50	2	3	0	0	0	6	1	59	3
Alfreton Town	2013–14	Conference Premier	26	2	2	0	0	0	1	0	29	2
Hednesford Town	2014–15	Conference North	18	1	0	0	0	0	0	0	18	1
Career total			535	23	28	2	17	0	33	1	613	26

== Honours ==
Hartlepool United

- Football League Third Division second-place promotion: 2002–03

Walsall

- Football League Two: 2006–07

Peterborough United

- Football League One second-place promotion: 2008–09
- Football League Two second-place promotion: 2007–08

Wrexham

- FA Trophy: 2012–13

Individual

- PFA Team of the Year: 2002–03 Third Division, 2006–07 League Two
- Wrexham Player of the Year: 2012–13
