= Darren Knowles =

English footballer

Personal information
- Full name: Darren Thomas Knowles
- Date of birth: 8 October 1970 (age 55)
- Place of birth: Sheffield, England
- Position: Right-back

Senior career*
Years	Team	Apps	(Gls)
1988–1989	Sheffield United	0	(0)
1989–1993	Stockport County	63	(0)
1993–1997	Scarborough	143	(2)
1997–2001	Hartlepool United	170	(2)
2001–2002	Northwich Victoria	17	(0)
2002–2003	Gainsborough Trinity		
2003–2004	Stocksbridge Park Steels		
2004–2006	Ilkeston Town	90	(0)
- * Club domestic league appearances and goals

Darren Thomas Knowles (born 8 October 1970) is an English footballer who played as a right-back in The Football League for Stockport County, Scarborough and Hartlepool United.

== Honours ==
Stockport County

- Associate Members' Cup runner-up: 1991–92
