= Lee Fitzpatrick =

English footballer

Personal information
- Full name: Lee Gareth Fitzpatrick
- Date of birth: 31 October 1978 (age 48)
- Place of birth: Manchester, England
- Position: Midfielder

Senior career*
Years	Team	Apps	(Gls)
1999–2000	Blackburn Rovers	0	(0)
1999	→ Hartlepool United (loan)	10	(1)
2000–2001	Hartlepool United	37	(3)
2001	Stevenage Borough	2	(0)
2001–2003	Leigh RMI	5	(0)
2002	Rossendale United	8	(0)
2005	Droylsden	2	(0)
2005	Ashton United	4	(0)
2005–2006	Droylsden	3	(0)
2006–2007	Radcliffe Borough	?	(?)
Total		63	(4)
- * Club domestic league appearances and goals

Lee Gareth Fitzpatrick (born 31 October 1978) in Manchester, England, is an English retired professional footballer who played as a midfielder for Blackburn Rovers and Hartlepool United in the Football League.

He is the older brother of former Halifax Town striker Ian Fitzpatrick.
