= Thomas Tennebø =

Norwegian footballer (born 1975)

Personal information
- Date of birth: 19 March 1975 (age 51)
- Place of birth: Bergen, Norway
- Height: 6 ft 02 in (1.88 m)
- Position: Midfielder

Team information
- Current team: Årstad IL

Senior career*
Years	Team	Apps	(Gls)
- Årstad IL
–1999	Fana IL		
1999–2001	Hartlepool United	13	(0)
2002–2003	Fana IL		
2004–2006	Løv-Ham		
2007	Fana IL		
2008–present	Årstad IL		
- * Club domestic league appearances and goals

Thomas Tennebø (born 19 March 1975) is a Norwegian football player.

While playing for Fana IL, he was sold to Hartlepool United in 1999, playing thirteen league games, three League Cup games and one Football League Trophy game over two seasons.
