= Andy McAvoy =

English footballer

Personal information
- Date of birth: 28 August 1979 (age 47)
- Place of birth: Middlesbrough, England
- Position: Midfielder

Senior career*
Years	Team	Apps	(Gls)
1998–1999	Blackburn Rovers	0	(0)
1999–2001	Hartlepool United	23	(0)
2001–2002	Macclesfield Town	10	(0)
- * Club domestic league appearances and goals

Andy McAvoy (born 28 August 1979) is an English footballer who played in The Football League for Blackburn Rovers, Hartlepool United, Macclesfield Town and Limerick F.C.
