= Graeme Lee (footballer, born 1978) =

English football manager (born 1978)

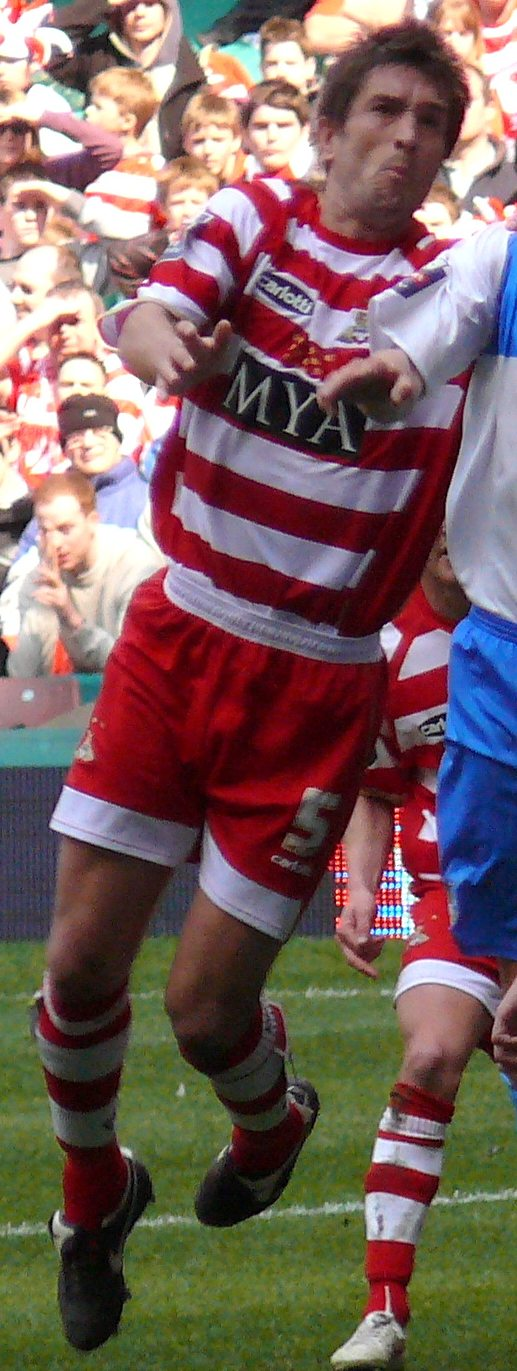

Personal information
- Full name: Graeme Barry Lee
- Date of birth: 31 May 1978 (age 48)
- Place of birth: Middlesbrough, England
- Height: 6 ft 2 in (1.88 m)
- Position: Defender

Team information
- Current team: Whitby Town (manager)

Senior career*
Years	Team	Apps	(Gls)
1995–2003	Hartlepool United	219	(20)
2003–2006	Sheffield Wednesday	67	(5)
2006–2008	Doncaster Rovers	60	(5)
2008	→ Hartlepool United (loan)	3	(0)
2008	→ Shrewsbury Town (loan)	5	(0)
2008–2009	Bradford City	44	(2)
2009–2011	Notts County	50	(4)
2011–2012	Darlington	24	(1)
2012–2013	Celtic Nation		
Total		472	(37)

Managerial career
- 2019–2021: Middlesbrough U23
- 2021–2022: Hartlepool United
- 2023–2024: Marske United
- 2024–2026: Spennymoor Town
- 2026–: Whitby Town
- * Club domestic league appearances and goals

Graeme Barry Lee (born 31 May 1978) is an English professional football manager and former player who played as a defender. He is currently the manager of Northern Premier League side Whitby Town.

He has previously played for Hartlepool United, Sheffield Wednesday, Doncaster Rovers, Bradford City, Darlington and also had loan spells with Hartlepool and Shrewsbury Town. Lee has won the Football League Trophy with Doncaster Rovers, and helped both Hartlepool United and Sheffield Wednesday to promotion in the mid-2000s.

== Playing career ==
=== Hartlepool United ===
Born in Middlesbrough, North Yorkshire, Lee started his career at Hartlepool United. At the age of 17, Lee made his first team debut for Hartlepool as a substitute in a 5–0 defeat to Arsenal in the League Cup. He formed a strong partnership with Chris Westwood as Pools reached the play-offs for three consecutive seasons. In 2001–02, Lee won the Player of the Year award. He was a member of Hartlepool's successful 2002–03 season which saw promotion to the Second Division, narrowly missing out on the League championship. Overall, he made over 250 appearances at centre back and also as a striker for Hartlepool, scoring 23 goals for the club.

=== Sheffield Wednesday ===
In 2003, he was snapped up by former boss Chris Turner for Sheffield Wednesday. He made 67 appearances for Wednesday and scored five goals in his first season and took up the captain's arm band when Dean Smith was injured, this made him a shining light in one of the Owl's worst ever seasons which led to him picking up a fans' player of the season award. Lee started the 2004–05 season in the same vein as he ended the last. Although dogged by injuries at the tail end of the season he was voted defender of the year by fans of the club. Sheffield Wednesday won promotion to the Championship after defeating former club Hartlepool United in the 2005 play-off final, however, Lee missed the match.

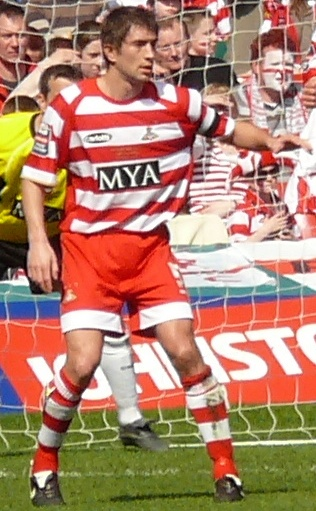
Lee playing for Doncaster Rovers

"Every single one of the players and staff at the club wants promotion. I've come here to help do that and if I can lift something at the end of the season, it would be absolutely brilliant."

— Graeme Lee, whilst at Bradford

=== Doncaster Rovers ===
Lee was deemed as not good enough for the Championship following the side's promotion by Paul Sturrock and signed for Doncaster Rovers from Sheffield Wednesday for £50,000 in 2005. He was Rovers' captain. He scored the winning goal in their 3–2 win over Bristol Rovers in the 2007 Football League Trophy final at Cardiff's Millennium Stadium.

At the start of the 2007–08 season, he was ruled out for six weeks with a neck problem, and when he returned he was sidelined for another four months because of a fractured knee. Instead on 14 February 2008, Lee signed for former club Hartlepool United on loan for one-month. Following his return to the Keepmoat Stadium, Lee was loaned out again, this time to Shrewsbury Town until the end of the season. He was recalled with two games remaining, after a series of injuries had left Rovers short of defensive cover. In June 2008, after a season in which he was limited to a couple of substitute performances, Lee was released by Doncaster Rovers.

=== Bradford City ===
On 30 June 2008, he signed a two-year deal with League Two side Bradford City. On 6 August 2008, Lee was made Bradford City club captain for the 2008–09 season, taking over from David Wetherall, who had retired at the end of the previous season. At the same time, he said it was his goal to lift the league title. He was one of four Bradford players to make his debut on the opening day of the 2008–09 season against Notts County, which Bradford won 2–1. His first goal for the club came in a 3–1 victory at Grimsby Town on 24 October 2008, having played in all City's opening 13 league games of the season. Two weeks later he added a second goal, helping City to upset League One-side Milton Keynes Dons 2–1 in the FA Cup. He played in the club's first 34 league and cup games of the season, before he missed his first game in February because of suspension from picking up five bookings.

=== Notts County ===
Lee signed a two-year deal for Notts County joining on a free transfer on 30 June 2009 just prior to the infamous takeover of the club by Munto Finance. Lee played an important role as County were promoted as Champions of League Two in 2010 under Ian McParland, Sven-Göran Eriksson, Hans Backe, Dave Kevan and Steve Cotterill. He started the 2010–11 season as first choice centre back for yet another new County manager Craig Short but he would not be part of next manager Paul Ince's plans and was made a free agent in December 2010 bringing to an end a memorable 18 months at the club.

=== Darlington ===
Lee then signed for Darlington on a one-year deal on 30 June 2011. Darlington suffered financial difficulties during Lee's time at the club and his contract was terminated on 16 January 2012, along with the rest of the playing squad and caretaker manager Craig Liddle.

However, despite the ongoing financial and contractual issues at Darlington, Lee continued to play on until a knee injury ruled him out for the remainder of the season.

Lee joined Celtic Nation during the 2012–13 close season break.

== Coaching career ==
In June 2019, Lee was appointed as Middlesbrough U23 head coach.

=== Hartlepool United ===
On 1 December 2021, he left his role at Middlesbrough to take over as manager at League Two side Hartlepool United. On 5 May 2022, with one game left in the season, Lee was sacked as manager of Hartlepool. During his five–month spell as manager, Lee led the team to the semi-finals of the EFL Trophy losing on penalties to eventual trophy winners Rotherham United and the fourth round of the FA Cup losing away to Premier League side Crystal Palace. However, it was the downturn in form following the defeat to Rotherham that was cited in Lee losing his job with the club only winning once out of their previous eleven games.

=== Marske United ===
On 22 May 2023, Lee was appointed as the manager of Marske United.

=== Spennymoor Town ===
Lee stepped down as Marske manager on 2 January 2024 to take up the role of manager at National League North club Spennymoor Town. In doing so, he followed in the footsteps of his father Tony Lee who had also managed the Moors. Despite a slow start to his tenure in charge, Lee turned around the club's form, leading them away from the relegation zone, earning the league's Manager of the Month award for February 2024. He won the award for a second consecutive month having guided his side to within three points of a play-off place. Despite winning 13 of their final 18 matches, Spennymoor missed out on a play-off finish by one point. On 2 May 2024, Lee signed a new deal to keep him with Spennymoor for the 2024–25 season. In the 2024–25 season, Spennymoor reached the 2025 FA Trophy final at Wembley Stadium. They lost 3–0 in the final to Aldershot Town in front of an attendance of 38,600. Spennymoor parted company with Lee in February 2026 following a disapppointing set of results.

=== Whitby Town ===
On 7 October 2026, Lee was appointed as the manager of Whitby Town.

== Personal life ==
He is the son of former footballer Tony Lee.

== Career statistics ==
Appearances and goals by club, season and competition
Club	Season	League			FA Cup		League Cup		Other		Total	
Club	Season	Division	Apps	Goals	Apps	Goals	Apps	Goals	Apps	Goals	Apps	Goals
Hartlepool United	1995–96	Third Division	6	0	0	0	1	0	1 (Note: Appearance(s) in Football League Trophy)	0	8	0
Hartlepool United	1996–97	Third Division	24	0	2	0	1	0	1	0	28	0
Hartlepool United	1997–98	Third Division	37	3	1	0	1	1	2	1	41	5
Hartlepool United	1998–99	Third Division	24	3	1	0	2	0	2	0	29	3
Hartlepool United	1999–2000	Third Division	38	7	2	0	2	0	4 (Note: Two appearances and one goal in Football League Trophy, two appearances in Third Division play-offs)	1	46	8
Hartlepool United	2000–01	Third Division	6	0	0	0	0	0	2 (Note: Appearance(s) in Third Division play-offs)	0	8	0
Hartlepool United	2001–02	Third Division	39	5	1	0	1	0	3 (Note: One appearance in Football League Trophy, two appearances in Third Division play-offs)	0	44	5
Hartlepool United	2002–03	Third Division	45	2	2	0	1	0	0	0	48	2
Hartlepool United	Total		219	20	9	0	9	1	15	2	252	23
Sheffield Wednesday	2003–04	Second Division	30	3	3	0	1	1	3	1	37	5
Sheffield Wednesday	2004–05	League One	22	1	1	0	0	0	0	0	23	1
Sheffield Wednesday	2005–06	Championship	15	1	0	0	0	0	0	0	15	1
Sheffield Wednesday	Total		67	5	4	0	1	1	3	1	75	7
Doncaster Rovers	2005–06	League One	20	1	0	0	0	0	0	0	20	1
Doncaster Rovers	2006–07	League One	39	4	3	0	1	1	6	1	49	6
Doncaster Rovers	2007–08	League One	1	0	0	0	0	0	0	0	1	0
Doncaster Rovers	Total		60	5	3	0	1	1	6	1	70	7
Hartlepool United (loan)	2007–08	League One	3	0	0	0	0	0	0	0	3	0
Shrewsbury Town (loan)	2007–08	League Two	5	0	0	0	0	0	0	0	5	0
Bradford City	2008–09	League Two	44	2	2	1	1	0	1	0	48	3
Notts County	2009–10	League Two	32	4	3	0	0	0	1	0	36	4
Notts County	2010–11	League One	18	0	0	0	1	0	0	0	19	0
Notts County	Total		50	4	3	0	1	0	1	0	55	4
Darlington	2011–12	Conference National	24	1	0	0	0	0	0	0	24	1
Career total			472	37	21	1	13	3	26	4	532	45

== Managerial statistics ==
As of match played 21 November 2026

Managerial record by team and tenure
Team	From	To	Record					Ref.
Team	From	To	P	W	D	L	Win %	Ref.
Hartlepool United	1 December 2021	5 May 2022	33	10	12	11	30.3	
Marske United	22 May 2023	2 January 2024	25	9	0	16	36.0	
Spennymoor Town	2 January 2024	22 February 2026	116	56	26	34	48.3	
Whitby Town	7 October 2026	Present	9	3	1	5	33.3	
Total			183	78	39	66	42.6	—

== Honours ==
=== As a player ===
Hartlepool United

- Football League Third Division second-place promotion: 2002–03

Doncaster Rovers

- Football League One play-offs: 2008
- Football League Trophy: 2006–07

Notts County

- Football League Two: 2009–10

Individual

- Hartlepool United Player of the Year: 2001–02
- PFA Team of the Year: 2002–03 Third Division

=== As a manager ===
Spennymoor Town

- FA Trophy runner-up: 2024–25

Individual

- National League North Manager of the Month: February 2024, March 2024
