= Sam Shilton =

English footballer

Personal information
- Date of birth: 21 July 1978 (age 48)
- Place of birth: Nottingham, England
- Positions: Defender; midfielder

Youth career
- 1994–1995: Plymouth Argyle

Senior career*
Years	Team	Apps	(Gls)
1994–1995	Plymouth Argyle	3	(0)
1995–1999	Coventry City	6	(0)
1999–2001	Hartlepool United	54	(8)
2001–2004	Kidderminster Harriers	79	(5)
2004–2005	Burton Albion	46	(1)
2005–2007	Hinckley United	106	(10)
2007–2008	Kettering Town	2	(0)
2008	Solihull Moors	0	(0)
2009–2010	Bedworth United		
2013	Hinckley United	3	(0)
Total		299	(27)
- * Club domestic league appearances and goals

Samuel Shilton (born 21 July 1978) is an English former footballer who played as a defender or midfielder.

== Career ==
=== Football League ===
Shilton started his football career with Plymouth Argyle as a trainee in August 1994. Roughly one year later, he was the subject of a £125,000 transfer to Midlands side Coventry City. During his time with the "Sky Blues", he played just six games before moving on to Hartlepool United. After three rather successful seasons with Hartlepool, Shilton moved back to the Midlands to Kidderminster Harriers where he appeared 79 times.

=== Non League ===
His next move was to Conference National side Burton Albion where he stayed for just over a year.

=== Hinckley United ===
He joined Hinckley United in July 2005, starting in midfield for the Conference North club, but an injury crisis caused him to be moved to defence. He played so well in that position that he was ever present in his defence role for Hinckley United, making over 100 appearances.

=== Kettering Town ===
Shilton left Hinckley on 7 December 2007, signing for Kettering Town. but made just two appearances during the 2007–08 season.

=== Solihull Moors ===
He moved on to Solihull Moors for the 2008–09 season. but was released, however, on 3 October 2008.

=== Bedworth United ===
After his release from Solihull Moors, Shilton was without a club for a season, but later moved onto Bedworth United of the Southern League Division One Midlands. He had been training with the club during the summer of 2009 before subsequently joining the club.

=== Hinckley United (second spell) ===
In August 2013, Hinckley United confirmed Shilton as one of their registered players for the 2013–14 season.

== Personal life ==
He is the son of former England goalkeeper Peter Shilton.
