= Craig Midgley =

English footballer and manager

Personal information
- Date of birth: 24 June 1976 (age 50)
- Place of birth: Bradford, England
- Height: 5 ft 8 in (1.73 m)
- Position: Striker

Youth career
- Bradford City

Senior career*
Years	Team	Apps	(Gls)
1995–1998	Bradford City	11	(1)
1995–1996	→ Scarborough (loan)	16	(1)
1997	→ Scarborough (loan)	6	(2)
1997	→ Darlington (loan)	1	(0)
1998–2001	Hartlepool United	86	(18)
2001–2006	Halifax Town	161	(32)
2006–2007	Farsley Celtic		
2007–2011	Manly United	21	(2)

Managerial career
- 2010–2015: Manly United (technical director)
- 2015–2017: Far North Queensland (technical director)
- 2017–: Gold Coast United (technical director)
- * Club domestic league appearances and goals

Craig Midgley (born 24 June 1976) is the Technical Director of Gold Coast United FC. He was previously an English football manager and former player who played as a striker.

== Playing career ==
=== Bradford City ===
Midgley was a trainee at his hometown club Bradford City. He made his first-team debut as a substitute on 17 April 1995 against Rotherham United. He failed to break into the team and during his three seasons in the first team squad he was limited to 11 league appearances from the bench. He scored one goal in a 1–1 draw with Hull City on 18 November 1995. Instead he had two loan spells at Scarborough and one at Darlington.

=== Hartlepool United ===
Midgley left Bradford to join Hartlepool United in March 1998. He spent more than three seasons at Victoria Park during which time he played 86 league games, 35 of which were as substitute, scoring 18 times. In June 2001 he moved back to West Yorkshire to join Halifax Town.

=== Halifax Town ===
In five seasons at Halifax, Midgley was a regular first-team player. He started 119 games, was substitute 42 times and scored 32 goals.

=== Farsley Celtic ===
He left to join Farsley Celtic and link up with former Bradford teammate Lee Sinnott. But he missed out on Farsley's Conference North play-off final in May 2007 after agreeing to join Australian side Manly United. Midgley hoped the move would launch a managerial or coaching career after taking the necessary qualifications.

=== Manly United ===
Midgley moved to Australia and signed for New South Wales Premier League side Manly United. He played for 3 years at the club, his final year being as a player/coach role. When Phil Moss moved to the A-League club Central Coast Mariners to be assistant coach to former Socceroos manager Graham Arnold, Midgley was appointed temporary head manager for the club.
