= Gordon Simms =

Northern Irish footballer (born 1981)

Personal information
- Full name: Gordon Henry Simms
- Date of birth: 23 March 1981 (age 45)
- Place of birth: Larne, County Antrim, Northern Ireland
- Position: Defender

Youth career
- Larne
- 1997–2000: Wolverhampton Wanderers

Senior career*
Years	Team	Apps	(Gls)
2000–2001	Wolverhampton Wanderers	0	(0)
2001–2003	Hartlepool United	11	(0)
2003–2004	Derry City		
2004	→ Ballymena United (loan)	10	(2)
2004–2007	Ballymena United	40	(3)
2007	Finn Harps	8	(1)
2007–2008	Hednesford Town		

International career
2001–2003	Northern Ireland U21	14	(0)
- * Club domestic league appearances and goals

Gordon Henry Simms (born 23 March 1981) is a Northern Irish former professional footballer who played as a defender. He played in the Football League for Hartlepool United.

== Career ==
Simms made his Irish League debut aged 15 for his hometown club Larne, before his performances soon earned him a move to England. He signed for English First Division side Wolverhampton Wanderers in Summer 1997 for £40,000.

After almost four years at Molineux, he failed to make a first team appearance and departed for Third Division Hartlepool United on a free transfer in March 2001 after completing a trial with them.

The defender made his Football League debut on 15 September 2001 when he came on as a substitute during a goalless draw at Southend United. This was the first of eleven appearances during the season as the club reached the play-offs. However, he made only two appearances further appearances during the following season, the last being in a 0–5 exit from the Football League Trophy at the hands of Tranmere.

During this he won fourteen caps for the Northern Ireland under-21 side. The first coming on 27 March 2001 in a European qualifier against Bulgaria. He had previously represented them at schoolboy, under-18 and under-16 level.

Simms was released by Hartlepool at the end of the 2002–03 season and returned to his native Northern Ireland to join Derry City. However, he soon departed on loan to Ballymena United in early 2004; a move made permanent that summer.

After two and a half years at The Showgrounds, he signed a short-term deal with Finn Harps in the League of Ireland First Division in January 2007. At the conclusion of this he returned to English football by signing for non-league club Hednesford Town for the 2007–08 season.
