= Paul Stephenson (footballer) =

English footballer (born 1968)

Personal information
- Date of birth: 2 January 1968 (age 58)
- Place of birth: Wallsend, England
- Height: 5 ft 10 in (1.78 m)
- Position: Defender

Team information
- Current team: Kilmarnock (assistant)

Youth career
- Newcastle United

Senior career*
Years	Team	Apps	(Gls)
1985–1988	Newcastle United	61	(1)
1988–1993	Millwall	98	(6)
1992–1993	→ Gillingham (loan)	12	(2)
1993–1995	Brentford	70	(2)
1995–1998	York City	97	(8)
1998–2003	Hartlepool United	147	(9)
Total		485	(28)

International career
1986	England Youth	2	(1)

Managerial career
- 2006: Hartlepool United (caretaker)
- 2007–2009: Norwich City (assistant)
- 2013–2014: Accrington (assistant)
- 2014–2015: Blackpool (assistant)
- 2016–2017: Kilmarnock (assistant)
- 2017–2019: Middlesbrough (U21)
- 2019–2020: Blyth Spartans (assistant)
- 2021–2022: Kilmarnock (assistant)
- 2023–: N. Ireland U21 (assistant)
- * Club domestic league appearances and goals

Paul Stephenson (born 2 January 1968) is an English former professional footballer who played as a winger or a central midfielder for Newcastle United, Millwall, Gillingham, Brentford and York City before he ended his career with Hartlepool United. During his footballing career he made a combined total of over 500 appearances.

He is currently assistant manager at Northern Ireland U21.

== Playing career ==
=== Newcastle United ===
Paul Stephenson was born in Wallsend. He started his career as an apprentice at Newcastle United in the same youth team that brought through the likes of Paul Gascoigne. He was by capped by England at youth level in 1986. He made his debut at the age of 17 and went on to make 63 starts and four substitute appearances for the club.

=== Millwall ===
In 1988, Stephenson was sold to Millwall for a fee of around £300,000. He spent his first four seasons playing regularly for the Lions in the same team as the likes of Teddy Sheringham and Tony Cascarino. However, after the arrival of new manager Mick McCarthy, Stephenson's first-team opportunities were limited and he found himself being loaned to Gillingham, for whom he made 12 league starts and scored two goals. Stephenson returned to Millwall but he failed to force his way back into the first team. While at Millwall, Stephenson made a total of 98 league appearances and scored sixgoals.

=== Brentford & York ===
Midway through the 1993–94 season, Stephenson was sold to Brentford for £30,000. During his two-and-a-half seasons at Griffin Park, Stephenson played regularly and made 70 appearances for the club. However, he decided to move back up north and joined York City for £35,000, which the then-York manager Alan Little has cited as a 'bargain'. Stephenson's first season at the club was disrupted by two severe injuries – a broken arm and hairline fracture of the leg. During his three seasons at Bootham Crescent, Stephenson established himself as York's first choice right winger and he made just under 100 appearances for the club, scoring five times. Little reluctantly placed him on the transfer list along with several other first-team players in order to raise much-needed funds before his contract ran out. Hartlepool, along with his former club Brentford, both made offers, but Little delayed the transfer in order to try and use the winger to help aid York's play-off bid. York failed to make the play-offs, however, and Stephenson took the opportunity to move closer to his Newcastle roots and joined Hartlepool in March 1998.

=== Hartlepool ===
He made his Hartlepool debut on 18 April against Mansfield Town. After the dismissal of Mick Tait and the arrival of a new manager in the form of Chris Turner, Stephenson's future at the club looked uncertain and he was rumoured to be on his way out as he struggled to force his way into Turner's side and he handed in a transfer request. During the final game of the season, against Southend United, Stephenson came off the bench and scored. During Stephenson's second season at the club, he was moved into the centre of midfield. After his performances during the 1999–2000 season, he was named Hartlepool Player of the Year.

He made his final appearance for Pools against Cheltenham Town in the play-off semi-final second leg, in which he missed a penalty in the deciding shootout. Stephenson failed to play a single game in the following season and, on 25 March 2003, he announced his retirement.

== Coaching career ==
=== Hartlepool and Norwich ===
After Stephenson's retirement, he immediately joined the coaching staff at Hartlepool and became an assistant youth-team coach. Following Martin Scott's promotion to the assistant manager's position, Stephenson was made the main youth team coach. Stephenson guided the youth team to victory in the Under 19s section of the Dallas Cup. Towards the end of the 2005–06 season, Stephenson was appointed as Hartlepool's caretaker manager after the dismissal of Scott. His first game in charge was a goalless draw against Rotherham. In his second game he managed to guide the team to a single-goal victory over Chesterfield. He was undefeated in his first five games in charge. However, Hartlepool slipped back into the relegation zone and were eventually relegated on the last day of the season. Stephenson stated that he did not want to take over as manager and wanted to remain a coach, and he returned to his job as youth team coach. Upon the arrival of new manager Glenn Roeder at Norwich, and his decision to build his own backroom staff, Stephenson was offered the job of first-team coach in early November 2007. Despite some trouble with the Hartlepool chairman regarding compensation, Roeder was ultimately successful with the appointment, and Stephenson commenced work with the Canaries two months later.

=== Huddersfield Town ===
Following Roeder's departure in 2009, Stephenson left the club and joined Roeder's assistant, Lee Clark, as Development Coach at Football League One side Huddersfield Town. On 11 November 2010 it was officially announced he would be the first-team coach at the Terriers. He left the club in the wake of the sacking of Clark in February 2012.

=== Blackpool ===
Stephenson was reunited with Lee Clark in December 2014 when he became First-Team Coach at Blackpool.

=== Kilmarnock ===
On 8 February 2021 he was appointed assistant manager of Scottish Premiership club Kilmarnock, working with manager Tommy Wright.
