= Kevin Henderson (footballer) =

English footballer

Personal information
- Date of birth: 8 June 1974 (age 52)
- Place of birth: Ashington, England
- Position: Striker

Senior career*
Years	Team	Apps	(Gls)
- Morpeth Town
1997–1999	Burnley	14	(1)
1999–2003	Hartlepool United	131	(29)
2003	→ Carlisle United (loan)	6	(1)
2003–2005	Carlisle United	24	(3)
2005	Gateshead	9	(4)
2005–200x	Morpeth Town		
- * Club domestic league appearances and goals

Kevin Henderson (born 8 June 1974) is an English former professional footballer who played in the Football League as a striker for Burnley, Hartlepool United and Carlisle United. He also played non-league football for Morpeth Town and Gateshead.

He was a part of the Hartlepool United side that won promotion to Division Two (now renamed League One) in the 2002–03 season. After retiring from football, he began running his family's kitchen and bedroom fitting firm.
