= 2005 Football League One play-off final =

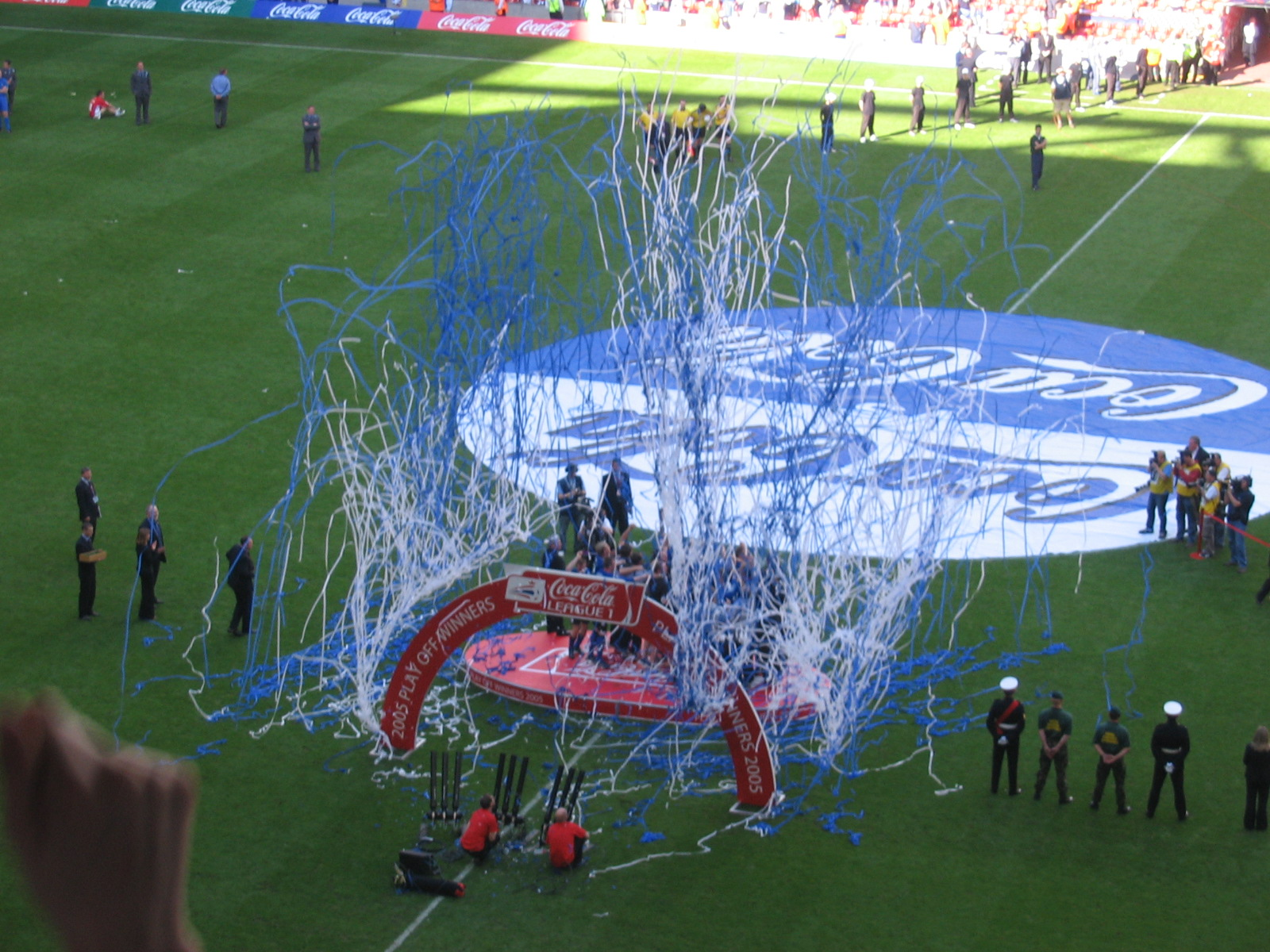
- Sheffield Wednesday lift the play-off trophy.
Hartlepool United	Sheffield Wednesday
2	4
- After extra time
- Date: 29 May 2005
- Venue: Millennium Stadium, Cardiff
- Referee: Phil Crossley
- Attendance: 59,808

The 2005 Football League One play-off final was an association football match which was played on 29 May 2005 at Millennium Stadium, Cardiff, between Hartlepool United and Sheffield Wednesday. It determined the third and final team to gain promotion from Football League One to the Football League Championship. The top two teams of the 2004–05 Football League One season, Luton Town and Hull City, gained automatic promotion to the Championship, while the teams placed from third to sixth place in the table took part in play-off semi-finals. The winners of these semi-finals competed for the final place for the 2005–06 season in the Championship. The losing semi-finalists were Tranmere Rovers and Brentford.

The referee for the match, which kicked off in front of 59,808 spectators, was Phil Crossley. Late in the first half, Craig Rocastle played a one-two with Lee Peacock before crossing to Jon-Paul McGovern who scored to put Sheffield Wednesday ahead at half-time. Early in the second half, a long throw-in from Ritchie Humphreys found first-half substitute Eifion Williams who equalised for Hartlepool. Jon Daly, who had been on the pitch for a minute, scored to put Hartlepool into the lead with a header from Gavin Strachan's free-kick in the 71st minute. In the 81st minute, Drew Talbot was brought down in the penalty area by Chris Westwood which the referee adjudged to have been a foul: he awarded a penalty to Sheffield Wednesday and sent off Westwood. Steven MacLean took the spot kick which Hartlepool goalkeeper Dimitrios Konstantopoulos was unable to keep out. With three minutes remaining, McGovern shot over the Hartlepool bar and regular time ended with score at 2–2, sending the match into extra time. Four minutes into the first period of additional time, Glenn Whelan scored it 3–2 to Sheffield Wednesday and Talbot secured the victory for Sheffield Wednesday when he scored in the 120th minute to make it 4–2 to see his side promoted to the Championship.

In their following season, Sheffield Wednesday finished in 19th place in the Championship, three places above the relegation zone. Hartlepool ended their next season in 21st position in League One and were relegated to League Two for the 2006–07 season.

== Route to the final ==
Football League One final table, leading positions
Pos	Team	Pld	W	D	L	GF	GA	GD	Pts
1	Luton Town	46	29	11	6	87	48	+39	98
2	Hull City	46	26	8	12	80	53	+27	86
3	Tranmere Rovers	46	22	13	11	73	55	+18	79
4	Brentford	46	22	9	15	57	60	−3	75
5	Sheffield Wednesday	46	19	15	12	77	59	+18	72
6	Hartlepool United	46	21	8	17	76	66	+10	71

Sheffield Wednesday finished the regular 2004–05 season in fifth place in Football League One, the third tier of the English football league system, one place ahead of Hartlepool United. Both therefore missed out on the two automatic places for promotion to the Football League Championship and instead took part in the play-offs to determine the third team to be promoted. Sheffield Wednesday finished fourteen points behind Hull City (who were promoted in second place) and twenty-six behind league winners Luton Town.

Hartlepool United's opponents in their play-off semi-final were Tranmere Rovers with the first match of the two-legged tie taking place on 13 May 2005 at Victoria Park in Hartlepool. In the 32nd minute, Jon Daly flicked on a long throw from Ritchie Humphreys, and Adam Boyd struck a shot past goalkeeper John Achterberg. Boyd doubled his tally on 68 minutes: after a one-two with Joel Porter, Boyd scored with a curling shot from 20 yards (18 m). Eugène Dadi's late shot for Tranmere was cleared off the goal-line by Matty Robson and the match ended 2–0. The second leg of the semi-final was held at Prenton Park near Tranmere four days later. The first half ended goalless but second-half goals from Ryan Taylor and David Beresford made it 2–0 to Tranmere and levelled the aggregate score, sending the game into extra time. With no addition to the score, the tie went to a penalty shootout. Dimitrios Konstantopoulos, the Hartlepool goalkeeper, saved strikes from both Taylor and Ian Sharps, and although Mark Tinkler missed his spot kick, Humphreys' goal secured a 6–5 penalty win and passage to the final.

Sheffield Wednesday faced Brentford in the other play-off semi-final and the first leg was contested at Hillsborough in Sheffield on 12 May 2005. Jon-Paul McGovern put the home side ahead in the 11th minute: he received the ball from a James Quinn backheel before striking past Stuart Nelson in the Brentford goal, despite Sam Sodje's attempt to clear it off the line. McGovern also struck the Brentford crossbar in a first half dominated by Sheffield Wednesday. The second half was more evenly matched and with no further goals, the match ended 1–0. The second leg, played at Griffin Park in Brentford, took place four days later. The Sheffield Wednesday goalkeeper David Lucas made a save from Deon Burton allowing his side to make a quick break from which they won a free-kick. Paul Heckingbottom took the set piece and his pass allowed Lee Peacock to score with a header. Soon after half-time, Chris Brunt scored from another free-kick, this time after taking a deflection off Brentford defender Chris Hargreaves. Andy Frampton scored a late consolation goal with a volley but the match ended 2–1 to Sheffield Wednesday who progressed to the Millennium Stadium with a 3–1 aggregate victory.

== Match ==
=== Background ===
Neale Cooper, the Hartlepool manager, left the club in May 2005 "by mutual consent" with his side needing only a draw in their final league game to secure a place in the play-offs. Martin Scott took over as caretaker manager, and led Hartlepool to the play-offs after securing a 2–2 draw against Bournemouth. His counterpart for the final, Paul Sturrock, had taken over with Sheffield Wednesday in September 2004 with the club in 14th place in League One.

This was the fifth time in six years that Hartlepool had been involved in the play-offs but the first time they had progressed to the final. They had been promoted to the third tier when they finished as runners-up in the 2002–03 Third Division season but had never played in the second tier of English football. Sheffield Wednesday were making their first appearance in the play-offs and had played in League One since suffering relegation in 2002–03 season. In the matches between the clubs during the regular season, both teams won their home games, with Sheffield Wednesday winning 2–0 at Hillsborough in November 2004 and Hartlepool winning 3–0 at Victoria Park the following April. Boyd was the leading scorer for Hartlepool with 29 goals in all competitions (22 in the regular league season, 2 in the play-offs, 3 in the FA Cup, 1 in the League Cup and 1 in the Football League Trophy.), followed by Porter with 15 (14 in the league and 1 in the FA Cup) and Antony Sweeney with 14 (13 in the league and 1 in the League Cup). Steven MacLean was leading marksman for Sheffield Wednesday having scored 18 goals (all in the league) during the regular season.

Sheffield Wednesday were considered favourites to win the match by bookmakers. Both teams adopted a 4–4–2 formation. The match was broadcast live in the United Kingdom on Sky Sports.

=== Summary ===
The match kicked off at around 3 p.m. on 29 May 2005 in front of 59,808 spectators at the Millennium Stadium in Cardiff, around 41,000 of them Sheffield Wednesday supporters. Sheffield Wednesday dominated the early stages but their only attempt on goal was a shot from Brunt in the 16th minute at Konstantopoulos. Sweeney then passed Gavin Strachan's corner to Boyd who struck the ball over the Wednesday goal from around 12 yards (11 m). Hartlepool's Thomas Butler was replaced through injury in the 31st minute by Eifion Williams before Porter's lob was too high. Glenn Whelan's through-ball then found Peacock but his shot on the turn went over Hartlepool's bar. Late in the first half, Craig Rocastle played a one-two with Peacock before crossing to McGovern who scored to put Sheffield Wednesday ahead at half-time.

No personnel changes were made by either side during the interval and Hartlepool controlled the opening stages of the second half. In the 47th minute, a long throw-in from Humphreys found Williams who equalised for Hartlepool. Robson made a run in the 52nd minute and despite beating McGovern, struck his shot high over the bar as the second half became a more evenly matched contest. Darren Craddock then came on in the 61st minute to replace Michael Barron for Hartlepool and nine minutes later, Porter pulled up with an injury and was replaced by Jon Daly. Within a minute, the substitute had scored to put Hartlepool into the lead with a header from Strachan's free-kick. On 75 minutes, Sheffield Wednesday made a triple-substitution with Pat Collins, MacLean and Drew Talbot coming on for Alex Bruce, Quinn and Peacock. Talbot's first attempt on goal was a bicycle kick. In the 81st minute, he was then brought down in the penalty area by Westwood which the referee adjudged to have been a foul: he awarded a penalty to Sheffield Wednesday and sent off Westwood. MacLean took the spot kick which Konstantopoulos was unable to keep out. With three minutes remaining, McGovern shot over the Hartlepool bar and regular time ended with score at 2–2, sending the match into extra time.

Four minutes into the first period of additional time, a mistake from Nelson allowed Whelan to strike the ball across the Hartlepool goalkeeper and into the goal to make it 3–2 to Sheffield Wednesday. Hartlepool gradually sent more players forward but Talbot secured the victory for Sheffield Wednesday when he scored in the 120th minute to make it 4–2 to see his side promoted to the Championship.

=== Details ===
29 May 2005
15:00 BST

Hartlepool United	2–4 (a.e.t.)	Sheffield Wednesday
Williams 47'; Daly 71'	Report	McGovern 45'; MacLean 82' (pen.); Whelan 94'; Talbot 120'

Millennium Stadium, Cardiff
Attendance: 59,808
Referee: Phil Crossley

Hartlepool United	Sheffield Wednesday

GK	21	Dimitrios Konstantopoulos
DF	2	Michael Barron (substituted off) 61'
DF	5	Michael Nelson
DF	6	Chris Westwood	(red card) 81'
MF	11	Gavin Strachan
MF	15	Antony Sweeney
MF	18	Matty Robson
MF	32	Thomas Butler (substituted off) 31'
FW	8	Ritchie Humphreys
FW	10	Adam Boyd
FW	14	Joel Porter (substituted off) 70'
Substitutes:
GK	1	Jim Provett
DF	22	Darren Craddock		(substituted on) 61'
MF	4	Mark Tinkler
FW	9	Eifion Williams		(substituted on) 31'
FW	16	Jon Daly		(substituted on) 70'
Manager:
Martin Scott

GK	1	David Lucas
DF	2	Lee Bullen
DF	3	Paul Heckingbottom
DF	16	Richard Wood
DF	18	Alex Bruce	(substituted off) 77'
MF	6	Glenn Whelan
MF	7	Jon-Paul McGovern
MF	11	Chris Brunt
MF	23	Craig Rocastle
FW	10	Lee Peacock (substituted off) 77'
FW	22	James Quinn (substituted off) 77'
Substitutes:
GK	21	Chris Adamson
DF	5	Steve Adams
DF	12	Patrick Collins		(substituted on) 77'
FW	9	Steven MacLean		(substituted on) 77'
FW	25	Drew Talbot		(substituted on) 77'
Manager:
Paul Sturrock

== Post-match ==
Sturrock said he was "relieved, tired and in need of a drink" but paid his respect to the opposing team, noting "credit to Hartlepool, they came out and rolled on top of us". His counterpart Scott noted that "Wednesday played well, we played well, but when you lose three players injured and one is sent off you feel it isn't your day ... We have overachieved again and we have gone one step farther than last year." Westwood described the decision of the referee to send him off as "life-changing". He said: "I just hope the ref is happy ... I have been told several times by people who are nothing to do with our club that it wasn't a penalty. The ball bounced in his favour, we both scrambled for it and Talbot went down. He looked for it, but that's his job." In an interview to commemorate the 15th anniversary of their win, Sheffield Wednesday's captain Lee Bullen noted that team-bonding was a key part of their success. Players were contractually obliged to live within 15 miles (24 km) of Sheffield, and team-bonding exercises prior to the final included a canoeing trip. On their journey back to Sheffield, gridlocked roads meant the players were able to disembark their team coach and start "a conga on the M4".

In their following season, Sheffield Wednesday finished in 19th place in the Championship, three places above the relegation zone. Hartlepool ended their next season in 21st position in League One and were relegated to League Two for the 2006–07 season.
