= 2004–05 Hartlepool United F.C. season =

Hartlepool United
2004–05 season
- Owner: IOR
- Chairman: Ken Hodcroft
- Manager: Neale Cooper (until 4 May); Martin Scott (from 4 May)
- Stadium: Victoria Park
- Football League One: 6th
- FA Cup: Fourth round (Eliminated by Brentford)
- Football League Cup: Second round (Eliminated by Crystal Palace)
- Football League Trophy: Third round (Eliminated by Oldham Athletic
- Top goalscorer: League: Adam Boyd (22); All: Adam Boyd (29)
- Highest home attendance: 7,580 (vs Brentford)
- Lowest home attendance: 1,535 (vs Hull City)
- Average home league attendance: 5,089
- Biggest win: 5–0 (vs. Milton Keynes Dons)
- Biggest defeat: 3–0 (vs. Luton Town, Peterborough United and Swindon Town)

The 2004–05 season was Hartlepool United's 96th year in existence and their second consecutive season in League One. Along with competing in League One, the club also participated in the FA Cup, League Cup and League Trophy. The season covers the period from 1 July 2004 to 30 June 2005.

== Players ==
As of End of Season.

=== First-team squad ===
Note: Flags indicate national team as defined under FIFA eligibility rules; some limited exceptions apply. Players may hold more than one non-FIFA nationality.

No.	Pos.	Nation	Player
1	GK	ENG	Jim Provett
2	DF	ENG	Michael Barron
3	DF	SCO	Hugh Robertson
4	MF	ENG	Mark Tinkler
5	DF	ENG	Michael Nelson
6	DF	ENG	Chris Westwood
7	MF	ENG	Darrell Clarke
8	MF	ENG	Ritchie Humphreys
9	FW	WAL	Eifion Williams
10	FW	ENG	Adam Boyd
11	MF	SCO	Gavin Strachan
12	DF	SCO	Jack Ross
14	FW	AUS	Joel Porter
15	MF	ENG	Antony Sweeney
16	FW	IRL	Jon Daly

No.	Pos.	Nation	Player
17	DF	ENG	Ben Clark
18	MF	ENG	Matty Robson
19	DF	ENG	John Brackstone
20	MF	ENG	Steven Istead
21	GK	GRE	Dimitrios Konstantopoulos
22	DF	ENG	Darren Craddock
23	FW	ENG	Jack Wilkinson
25	FW	ENG	Andrew Appleby
26	FW	ENG	David Foley
28	FW	ENG	James Brown
29	MF	ENG	Michael Maidens
30	MF	ENG	Stephen Turnbull
32	MF	IRL	Thomas Butler
42	DF	ENG	Steve Howey

== Transfers ==
=== Transfers in ===
Date	Position	Player	From	Fee	Ref
23 April 2004	DF	Jack Ross	Clyde	Free	
17 September 2004	FW	James Brown	Cramlington	Free	
22 October 2004	DF	Ben Clark	Sunderland	Free	
4 February 2005	FW	Jon Daly	Stockport County	Undisclosed	
25 March 2005	DF	Steve Howey	New England Revolution	Free	
25 March 2005	MF	Thomas Butler	Dunfermline Athletic	Free	

=== Loans in ===
Date	Position	Player	From	End date	Ref
9 September 2004	MF	Martin Woods	Leeds United	22 October 2004	
10 September 2004	MF	Alan Pouton	Gillingham	10 October 2004	
1 November 2004	MF	Lewis Gobern	Wolverhampton Wanderers	1 December 2004	

=== Transfers out ===
Date	Position	Name	To	Fee	Ref
25 May 2004	FW	Jermaine Easter	Cambridge United	Free	
1 July 2004	FW	Paul Robinson	York City	Free	
18 July 2004	GK	Anthony Williams	Grimsby Town	Free	
30 July 2004	DF	Scott Walker	Brechin City	Free	
2 August 2004	MF	Stephen Carson	Glentoran	Free	
10 August 2004	DF	Mark Robinson	Hereford United	Free	
31 August 2004	MF	Ryan McCann	St Johnstone	Free	

=== Loans out ===
Date	Position	Player	From	End date	Ref
24 September 2004	FW	Jack Wilkinson	Bishop Auckland	24 October 2004	
15 October 2004	FW	Andrew Appleby	Blyth Spartans	15 November 2004	
11 January 2005	MF	Darrell Clarke	Stockport County	17 January 2005	

== Results ==
=== Pre-season friendlies ===
14 July 2004	Top Oss	2–2	Hartlepool United	Oss
19:00		Report	Strachan (pen.); Istead	Stadium: Frans Heesen Stadion

17 July 2004	FC Eindhoven	1–2	Hartlepool United	Eindhoven
15:00		Report	Porter	Stadium: Jan Louwers Stadion

20 July 2004	Billingham Town	0–4	Hartlepool United	Billingham
19:00		Report	Foley; Clarke; Rae	Stadium: Bedford Terrace

23 July 2004	Ross County	2–0	Hartlepool United	Dingwall
15:00		Report		Stadium: Victoria Park

24 July 2004	Inverness Caledonian Thistle	1–1	Hartlepool United	Inverness
15:00		Report	Williams	Stadium: Caledonian Stadium

27 July 2004	Berwick Rangers	1–2	Hartlepool United	Berwick-upon-Tweed
19:00		Report	Porter; Strachan (pen.)	Stadium: Shielfield Park

31 July 2004	Carlisle United	1–3	Hartlepool United	Carlisle
15:00	McGill 69'	Report	Boyd 57'; Humphreys 59'; Porter 82'	Stadium: Brunton Park; Attendance: 1,449

=== League One ===
==== League table ====
Pos	Team	Pld	W	D	L	GF	GA	GD	Pts	Promotion or relegation
4	Brentford	46	22	9	15	57	60	−3	75	Qualification for League One play-offs
5	Sheffield Wednesday (O, P)	46	19	15	12	77	59	+18	72	Qualification for League One play-offs
6	Hartlepool United	46	21	8	17	76	66	+10	71	Qualification for League One play-offs
7	Bristol City	46	18	16	12	74	57	+17	70	
8	Bournemouth	46	20	10	16	77	64	+13	70	

Updated to match(es) played on May 2005. Source: Soccerbase
Rules for classification: 1) points; 2) goal difference; 3) number of goals scored.
(O) Play-off winners; (P) Promoted

==== Results summary ====
Overall								Home						Away					
Pld	W	D	L	GF	GA	GD	Pts	W	D	L	GF	GA	GD	W	D	L	GF	GA	GD
46	21	8	17	76	66	+10	71	15	3	5	51	30	+21	6	5	12	25	36	−11

==== Results by matchday ====
Round	1	2	3	4	5	6	7	8	9	10	11	12	13	14	15	16	17	18	19	20	21	22	23	24	25	26	27	28	29	30	31	32	33	34	35	36	37	38	39	40	41	42	43	44	45	46
Ground	H	A	A	H	A	H	H	A	H	A	H	A	H	A	A	H	H	A	H	A	H	A	H	A	A	H	A	H	A	H	A	H	A	H	A	H	A	H	A	H	H	A	H	A	H	A
Result	W	L	W	D	L	W	D	L	W	L	W	L	W	L	L	W	W	L	W	L	W	W	W	D	D	W	W	W	W	L	W	W	L	L	L	L	W	L	D	W	D	D	W	L	L	D
Position	6	12	4	7	14	8	9	15	7	11	9	11	10	11	13	10	8	13	9	10	9	7	4	5	7	5	5	5	5	5	5	4	5	5	5	6	5	5	5	5	6	5	4	4	5	6

Source: InTheMadCrowd
A = Away; H = Home; W = Win; D = Draw; L = Loss

==== Results ====
7 August 2004 1	Hartlepool United	2–1	Bradford City	Hartlepool
15:00	Boyd 75' (pen.); Robertson 81'	Report	Windass 54'	Stadium: Victoria Park; Attendance: 6,032; Referee: Graham Salisbury

10 August 2004 2	Tranmere Rovers	2–1	Hartlepool United	Birkenhead
19:45	Taylor 27' (pen.); Dagnall 68'	Report	Robertson 23'	Stadium: Prenton Park; Attendance: 8,128; Referee: Martin Atkinson

16 August 2004 3	Huddersfield Town	0–2	Hartlepool United	Huddersfield
19:45		Report	Betsy 68'; Tinkler 70'	Stadium: Galpharm Stadium; Attendance: 9,968; Referee: Andy Hall

21 August 2004 4	Hartlepool United	1–1	Blackpool	Hartlepool
15:00	Williams 24'	Report	Taylor 72'	Stadium: Victoria Park; Attendance: 5,144; Referee: Paul Robinson

28 August 2004 5	Swindon Town	3–0	Hartlepool United	Swindon
15:00	Henderson 17'; Parkin 37'; Nelson 40' (o.g.)	Report		Stadium: County Ground; Attendance: 5,365; Referee: Paul Danson

30 August 2004 6	Hartlepool United	2–1	Colchester United	Hartlepool
15:00	Williams 38'; Boyd 70'	Report	Keith 90'	Stadium: Victoria Park; Attendance: 4,371; Referee: Mike Pike

4 September 2004 7	Hartlepool United	1–1	Barnsley	Hartlepool
15:00	Boyd 77'	Report	Chopra 38'	Stadium: Victoria Park; Attendance: 5,119; Referee: Clive Oliver

11 September 2004 8	Oldham Athletic	3–2	Hartlepool United	Oldham
15:00	Eyre 43'; Betsy 60'; Johnson 82'	Report	Westwood 78'; Griffin 90' (o.g.)	Stadium: Boundary Park; Attendance: 5,805; Referee: Phil Joslin

18 September 2004 9	Hartlepool United	4–1	Torquay United	Hartlepool
15:00	Porter 6'; Sweeney 64'; Tinkler 73'; Humphreys 83'	Report	Gritton 10'	Stadium: Victoria Park; Attendance: 4,485; Referee: Mark Cowburn

25 September 2004 10	Milton Keynes Dons	4–2	Hartlepool United	Milton Keynes
15:00	McLeod 31', 57'; Small 46'; Smith 50' (pen.)	Report	Boyd 20', 87'	Stadium: National Hockey Stadium; Attendance: 3,685; Referee: Joe Ross

2 October 2004 11	Hartlepool United	2–0	Hull City	Hartlepool
15:00	Porter 8'; Boyd 50'	Report		Stadium: Victoria Park; Attendance: 5,768; Referee: Anthony Leake

8 October 2004 12	Luton Town	3–0	Hartlepool United	Luton
19:45	Howard 36'; Brkovic 61'; McSheffrey 84'	Report		Stadium: Kenilworth Road; Attendance: 7,865; Referee: Michael Ryan

16 October 2004 13	Hartlepool United	3–2	Chesterfield	Hartlepool
15:00	Sweeney 3', 8', 83'	Report	Nicholson 25' (pen.); Stallard 50'	Stadium: Victoria Park; Attendance: 4,617; Referee: Phil Prosser

19 October 2004 14	Brentford	2–1	Hartlepool United	Brentford
19:45	Rankin 35'; Burton 90'	Report	Robson 31'	Stadium: Griffin Park; Attendance: 4,797; Referee: Iain Williamson

23 October 2004 15	Peterborough United	3–0	Hartlepool United	Peterborough
15:00	Kennedy 15'; Willock 18'; Legg 55'	Report		Stadium: London Road; Attendance: 3,841; Referee: Jarnail Singh

30 October 2004 16	Hartlepool United	1–0	Port Vale	Hartlepool
15:00	Williams 24'	Report		Stadium: Victoria Park; Attendance: 4,755; Referee: Scott Mathieson

6 November 2004 17	Hartlepool United	2–1	Doncaster Rovers	Hartlepool
15:00	Porter 78', 89'	Report	Roberts 30'	Stadium: Victoria Park; Attendance: 5,495; Referee: Chris Foy

20 November 2004 18	Sheffield Wednesday	2–0	Hartlepool United	Sheffield
15:00	MacLean 59'; Hamshaw 85'	Report		Stadium: Hillsborough; Attendance: 19,919; Referee: Brian Curson

27 November 2004 19	Hartlepool United	3–2	Bournemouth	Hartlepool
15:00	Westwood 23'; Nelson 88'; Appleby 90'	Report	Holmes 34'; Stock 45'	Stadium: Victoria Park; Attendance: 4,376; Referee: Carl Boyeson

7 December 2004 20	Walsall	2–1	Hartlepool United	Walsall
19:45	Fryatt 51'; Leitao 69'	Report	Boyd 33'	Stadium: Bescot Stadium; Attendance: 5,522; Referee: Darren Drysdale

11 December 2004 21	Hartlepool United	3–1	Stockport County	Hartlepool
15:00	Westwood 28', 51'; Porter 55'	Report	Daly 26'	Stadium: Victoria Park; Attendance: 4,572; Referee: Paul Robinson

18 December 2004 22	Wrexham	1–5	Hartlepool United	Wrexham
15:00	Ugarte 25'	Report	Humphreys 8'; Sweeney 18', 72'; Porter 35'; Boyd 37'	Stadium: Racecourse Ground; Attendance: 3,582; Referee: Paul Danson

26 December 2004 23	Hartlepool United	2–1	Oldham Athletic	Hartlepool
15:00	Boyd 7' (pen.), 23' (pen.)	Report	Holden 64'	Stadium: Victoria Park; Attendance: 6,520; Referee: Phil Prosser

28 December 2004 24	Bristol City	0–0	Hartlepool United	Bristol
15:00		Report		Stadium: Ashton Gate; Attendance: 13,034; Referee: Richard Beeby

1 January 2005 25	Barnsley	0–0	Hartlepool United	Barnsley
15:00		Report		Stadium: Oakwell; Attendance: 9,595; Referee: Eddie Evans

3 January 2005 26	Hartlepool United	5–0	Milton Keynes Dons	Hartlepool
15:00	Sweeney 21'; Boyd 49', 57'; Porter 80'; Appleby 90'	Report		Stadium: Victoria Park; Attendance: 5,060; Referee: Colin Webster

15 January 2005 27	Torquay United	1–2	Hartlepool United	Torquay
15:00	Kuffour 13'	Report	Porter 68'; Sweeney 71'	Stadium: Plainmoor; Attendance: 2,543; Referee: Lee Probert

22 January 2005 28	Hartlepool United	2–1	Bristol City	Hartlepool
15:00	Boyd 16' (pen.); Sweeney 71'	Report	Brooker 26'	Stadium: Victoria Park; Attendance: 5,399; Referee: Brian Curson

5 February 2005 29	Chesterfield	0–1	Hartlepool United	Chesterfield
15:00		Report	Boyd 55'	Stadium: Saltergate; Attendance: 4,606; Referee: Andy Woolmer

15 February 2005 30	Hartlepool United	2–3	Luton Town	Hartlepool
19:45	Davis 62' (o.g.); Robson 90'	Report	Coyne 21'; Showunmi 58'; Foley 64'	Stadium: Victoria Park; Attendance: 5,542; Referee: Mike Jones

19 February 2005 31	Port Vale	0–1	Hartlepool United	Burslem
15:00		Report	Porter 2'	Stadium: Vale Park; Attendance: 4,366; Referee: Anthony Leake

22 February 2005 32	Hartlepool United	3–1	Brentford	Hartlepool
19:45	Boyd 54' (pen.); Williams 74'; Sweeney 86'	Report	Rankin 50'	Stadium: Victoria Park; Attendance: 4,206; Referee: Carl Boyeson

26 February 2005 33	Stockport County	1–0	Hartlepool United	Stockport
15:00	Feeney 19'	Report		Stadium: Edgeley Park; Attendance: 4,548; Referee: Lee Mason

5 March 2005 34	Hartlepool United	4–6	Wrexham	Hartlepool
15:00	Strachan 4'; Porter 31', 84'; Boyd 62'	Report	Ugarte 11', 21', 35' (pen.), 68', 89'; Jones 86'	Stadium: Victoria Park; Attendance: 4,707; Referee: Kevin Friend

8 March 2005 35	Hull City	1–0	Hartlepool United	Hull
19:45	Elliott 14'	Report		Stadium: KC Stadium; Attendance: 17,112; Referee: Mike Thorpe

12 March 2005 36	Hartlepool United	0–1	Tranmere Rovers	Hartlepool
15:00		Report	Dagnall 53'	Stadium: Victoria Park; Attendance: 4,887; Referee: Andy Penn

19 March 2005 37	Bradford City	1–2	Hartlepool United	Bradford
15:00	Bower 60'	Report	Williams 42'; Porter 73'	Stadium: Valley Parade; Attendance: 7,909; Referee: Phil Joslin

25 March 2005 38	Hartlepool United	0–1	Huddersfield Town	Hartlepool
19:45		Report	Booth 42'	Stadium: Victoria Park; Attendance: 6,205; Referee: Mike Pike

28 March 2005 39	Blackpool	2–2	Hartlepool United	Blackpool
15:00	Southern 3' (pen.); Clarke 82'	Report	Boyd 27', 28'	Stadium: Bloomfield Road; Attendance: 6,853; Referee: Scott Mathieson

2 April 2005 40	Hartlepool United	3–0	Swindon Town	Hartlepool
15:00	Porter 31'; Butler 49'; Humphreys 83'	Report		Stadium: Victoria Park; Attendance: 4,936; Referee: Martin Atkinson

5 April 2005 41	Hartlepool United	2–2	Peterborough United	Hartlepool
19:45	Porter 22'; Sweeney 36'	Report	Logan 49'; Willock 56'	Stadium: Victoria Park; Attendance: 4,579; Referee: Darren Drysdale

9 April 2005 42	Colchester United	1–1	Hartlepool United	Colchester
15:00	Johnson 39'	Report	Sweeney 54'	Stadium: Layer Road; Attendance: 3,148; Referee: Mark Warren

15 April 2005 43	Hartlepool United	3–0	Sheffield Wednesday	Hartlepool
19:45	Boyd 2', 18', 58'	Report		Stadium: Victoria Park; Attendance: 6,429; Referee: Eddie Evans

23 April 2005 44	Doncaster Rovers	2–0	Hartlepool United	Doncaster
15:00	Ravenhill 59'; Fortune-West 90'	Report		Stadium: Belle Vue Stadium; Attendance: 7,024; Referee: Paul Melin

30 April 2005 45	Hartlepool United	1–3	Walsall	Hartlepool
15:00	Boyd 77' (pen.)	Report	Robson 10' (o.g.); Joachim 14'; Surman 42'	Stadium: Victoria Park; Attendance: 6,389; Referee: Colin Webster

7 May 2005 46	Bournemouth	2–2	Hartlepool United	Bournemouth
15:00	Hayter 12', 31'	Report	Daly 20'; Sweeney 65'	Stadium: Dean Court; Attendance: 8,620; Referee: Steve Tanner

==== Play-offs ====
13 May 2005 Semi-final first leg	Hartlepool United	2–0	Tranmere Rovers	Hartlepool
19:45	Boyd 32', 68'	Report		Stadium: Victoria Park; Attendance: 6,604; Referee: Brian Curson

17 May 2005 Semi-final second leg	Tranmere Rovers	2–0 (a.e.t.) (5–6 p)	Hartlepool United	Birkenhead
19:45	Taylor 70'; Beresford 87'	Report		Stadium: Prenton Park; Attendance: 13,356; Referee: Martin Atkinson
	Penalties
	Taylor (penalty missed); Hall (penalty scored); Roberts (penalty scored); Hume (penalty scored); Dagnall (penalty scored); Beresford (penalty scored); Sharps (penalty missed)		Strachan (penalty scored); Tinkler (penalty missed); Porter (penalty scored); Robson (penalty scored); Westwood (penalty scored); Sweeney (penalty scored); Humphreys (penalty scored)

29 May 2005 Final	Hartlepool United	2–4 (a.e.t.)	Sheffield Wednesday	Cardiff
15:00	Williams 47'; Daly 71'	Report	McGovern 45'; MacLean 82' (pen.); Whelan 94'; Talbot 120'	Stadium: Millennium Stadium; Attendance: 59,808; Referee: Phil Crossley

=== FA Cup ===
13 November 2004 First round	Hartlepool United	3–0	Lincoln City	Hartlepool
15:00	Williams 23'; Robson 27'; Porter 43'	Report		Stadium: Victoria Park; Attendance: 4,533; Referee: Michael Ryan

4 December 2004 Second round	Hartlepool United	5–1	Aldershot Town	Hartlepool
15:00	Westwood 13', 30'; Boyd 63', 68'; Tinkler 75'	Report	Sills 36'	Stadium: Victoria Park; Attendance: 4,556; Referee: Scott Mathieson

8 January 2005 Third round	Hartlepool United	0–0	Boston United	Hartlepool
15:00		Report		Stadium: Victoria Park; Attendance: 5,342; Referee: Alan Kaye

19 January 2005 replay	Boston United	0–1	Hartlepool United	Boston
19:45		Report	Boyd 72'	Stadium: York Street; Attendance: 3,653; Referee: Alan Kaye

29 January 2005 Fourth round	Brentford	0–0	Hartlepool United	Brentford
15:00		Report		Stadium: Griffin Park; Attendance: 8,967; Referee: Richard Beeby

12 February 2005 replay	Hartlepool United	0–1	Brentford	Hartlepool
15:00		Report	Rankin 48'	Stadium: Victoria Park; Attendance: 7,580; Referee: Lee Mason

=== League Cup ===
24 August 2004 First round	Hartlepool United	2–1	Macclesfield Town	Hartlepool
19:45	Boyd 79'; Sweeney 87'	Report	Parkin 48'	Stadium: Victoria Park; Attendance: 2,883; Referee: Michael Ryan

21 September 2004 Second round	Crystal Palace	2–1 (a.e.t.)	Hartlepool United	Selhurst
19:45	Freedman 80'; Soares 110'	Report	Williams 70'	Stadium: Selhurst Park; Attendance: 4,233; Referee: Kevin Wright

=== Football League Trophy ===
28 September 2004 First round	Hartlepool United	3–3 (a.e.t.) (4–1 p)	Hull City	Hartlepool
19:45	Strachan 55' (pen.); Pouton 60'; Porter 114'	Report	Price 12'; Green 46'; Elliott 107'	Stadium: Victoria Park; Attendance: 1,535; Referee: Colin Webster
	Penalties
	Strachan (penalty scored); Brackstone (penalty scored); Porter (penalty scored); Boyd (penalty scored)		Green (penalty scored); Elliott (penalty missed); Ashbee (penalty missed)

2 November 2004 Second round	Carlisle United	0–1	Hartlepool United	Carlisle
19:45		Report	Sweeney 66'	Stadium: Brunton Park; Attendance: 2,871; Referee: Lee Mason

30 November 2004 Third round	Oldham Athletic	3–1	Hartlepool United	Oldham
19:45	Kilkenny 14'; Killen 17' (pen.); Croft 79'	Report	Boyd 32'	Stadium: Boundary Park; Attendance: 2,835; Referee: Mark Cowburn

== Squad statistics ==
=== Appearances and goals ===
No.	Pos	Nat	Player	Total		League One		FA Cup		League Cup		Other	
No.	Pos	Nat	Player	Apps	Goals	Apps	Goals	Apps	Goals	Apps	Goals	Apps	Goals
1	GK	(England) ENG	Jim Provett	23	0	21	0	1	0	1	0	0	0
2	DF	(England) ENG	Michael Barron	19	0	13	0	1	0	0	0	5	0
3	DF	(Scotland) SCO	Hugh Robertson	24	2	20	2	4	0	0	0	0	0
4	MF	(England) ENG	Mark Tinkler	44	3	33	2	5	1	2	0	4	0
5	DF	(England) ENG	Michael Nelson	56	1	43	1	5	0	2	0	6	0
6	DF	(England) ENG	Chris Westwood	50	6	37	4	6	2	2	0	5	0
8	MF	(England) ENG	Ritchie Humphreys	60	3	46	3	6	0	2	0	6	0
9	FW	(Wales) WAL	Eifion Williams	48	8	38	5	3	1	2	1	5	1
10	FW	(England) ENG	Adam Boyd	58	29	45	22	6	3	2	1	5	3
11	MF	(Scotland) SCO	Gavin Strachan	38	2	29	1	2	0	2	0	5	1
12	DF	(Scotland) SCO	Jack Ross	31	0	24	0	6	0	0	0	1	0
14	FW	(Australia) AUS	Joel Porter	52	16	39	14	5	1	2	0	6	1
15	MF	(England) ENG	Antony Sweeney	57	15	44	13	6	0	2	1	5	1
16	MF	(Scotland) SCO	Martin Woods	8	0	6	0	0	0	1	0	1	0
16	MF	(England) ENG	Lewis Gobern	2	0	1	0	0	0	0	0	1	0
16	FW	(Republic of Ireland) IRL	Jon Daly	15	2	12	1	0	0	0	0	3	1
17	MF	(England) ENG	Kevin Betsy	7	1	6	1	0	0	1	0	0	0
17	MF	(England) ENG	Alan Pouton	6	1	5	0	0	0	0	0	1	1
17	DF	(England) ENG	Ben Clark	32	0	25	0	6	0	0	0	1	0
18	DF	(England) ENG	Matty Robson	36	2	27	2	2	0	2	0	5	0
19	DF	(England) ENG	John Brackstone	12	0	9	0	1	0	0	0	2	0
20	MF	(England) ENG	Steven Istead	26	0	17	0	6	0	1	0	2	0
21	GK	(Greece) GRE	Dimitrios Konstantopoulos	37	0	25	0	5	0	1	0	6	0
22	DF	(England) ENG	Darren Craddock	15	0	10	0	0	0	1	0	4	0
23	FW	(England) ENG	Jack Wilkinson	3	0	3	0	0	0	0	0	0	0
25	FW	(England) ENG	Andrew Appleby	19	2	15	2	3	0	0	0	1	0
27	FW	(England) ENG	David Foley	4	0	2	0	1	0	0	0	1	0
29	MF	(England) ENG	Michael Maidens	2	0	1	0	0	0	1	0	0	0
30	MF	(England) ENG	Stephen Turnbull	2	0	2	0	0	0	0	0	0	0
32	MF	(Republic of Ireland) IRL	Thomas Butler	11	1	9	1	0	0	0	0	2	0
42	DF	(England) ENG	Steve Howey	1	0	1	0	0	0	0	0	0	0

=== Goalscorers ===
Rank	Name	League One	FA Cup	League Cup	Other	Total
1	Adam Boyd	22	3	1	3	29
2	Joel Porter	14	1	0	1	16
3	Antony Sweeney	13	0	1	1	15
4	Eifion Williams	5	1	1	1	8
5	Chris Westwood	4	2	0	0	6
6	Ritchie Humphreys	3	0	0	0	3
6	Mark Tinkler	2	1	0	0	3
7	Andrew Appleby	2	0	0	0	2
7	Jon Daly	1	0	0	1	2
7	Hugh Robertson	2	0	0	0	2
7	Matty Robson	1	1	0	0	2
7	Gavin Strachan	1	0	0	1	2
8	Kevin Betsy	1	0	0	0	1
8	Thomas Butler	1	0	0	0	1
8	Michael Nelson	1	0	0	0	1
8	Alan Pouton	0	0	0	1	1

=== Clean Sheets ===
Rank	Name	League One	FA Cup	League Cup	Other	Total
1	Dimitrios Konstantopoulos	7	4	0	2	13
2	Jim Provett	3	0	0	0	3

=== Penalties ===
Date	Name	Opposition	Scored?
7 August 2004	Adam Boyd	Bradford City	✓
28 September 2004	Gavin Strachan	Hull City	✓
27 November 2004	Adam Boyd	Bournemouth	✗
26 December 2004	Adam Boyd	Oldham Athletic	✓
26 December 2004	Adam Boyd	Oldham Athletic	✓
3 January 2005	Joel Porter	Milton Keynes Dons	✗
8 January 2005	Adam Boyd	Boston United	✗
15 January 2005	Mark Tinkler	Torquay United	✗
22 January 2005	Adam Boyd	Bristol City	✓
22 February 2005	Adam Boyd	Brentford	✓
30 April 2005	Adam Boyd	Walsall	✓

=== Suspensions ===
Date Incurred	Name	Games Missed	Reason
25 September 2004	Antony Sweeney	3	(red card) (vs. Milton Keynes Dons)
