= 2005–06 Hartlepool United F.C. season =

Hartlepool United
2005–06 season
- Owner: IOR
- Chairman: Ken Hodcroft
- Manager: Martin Scott (until 28 January); Paul Stephenson (from 4 February)
- Stadium: Victoria Park
- Football League One: 21st (relegated)
- FA Cup: Second round (Eliminated by Tamworth)
- Football League Cup: Second round (Eliminated by Charlton Athletic)
- Football League Trophy: First round (Eliminated by Scunthorpe United
- Top goalscorer: League: Eifion Williams (7); All: Michael Proctor (7); Eifion Williams (7)
- Highest home attendance: 6,895 (vs Port Vale)
- Lowest home attendance: 3,375 (vs Colchester United)
- Average home league attendance: 4,811
- Biggest win: 3–1 (vs. Darlington, Gillingham and Huddersfield Town)
- Biggest defeat: 3–0 (vs. Blackpool and Southend United)

The 2005–06 season was Hartlepool United's 97th year in existence and their third consecutive season in League One. Along with competing in League One, the club also participated in the FA Cup, League Cup and League Trophy. The season covers the period from 1 July 2005 to 30 June 2006.

== Players ==
As of End of Season.

=== First-team squad ===
Note: Flags indicate national team as defined under FIFA eligibility rules; some limited exceptions apply. Players may hold more than one non-FIFA nationality.

No.	Pos.	Nation	Player
1	GK	GRE	Dimitrios Konstantopoulos
2	DF	ENG	Michael Barron
3	DF	SCO	Hugh Robertson
4	MF	ENG	Mark Tinkler
5	DF	ENG	Michael Nelson
6	FW	ENG	Michael Proctor
7	MF	WAL	Chris Llewellyn
8	MF	ENG	Ritchie Humphreys
9	FW	AUS	Joel Porter
10	FW	ENG	Adam Boyd
11	FW	WAL	Eifion Williams
12	MF	SCO	Gavin Strachan
14	FW	IRL	Jon Daly
15	MF	ENG	Antony Sweeney
16	DF	ENG	Ben Clark
17	MF	ENG	Darrell Clarke

No.	Pos.	Nation	Player
18	MF	ENG	Matty Robson
19	DF	ENG	John Brackstone
20	DF	ENG	Darren Craddock
21	GK	ENG	Jim Provett
22	MF	ENG	Lee Bullock
23	DF	ENG	Darren Williams
24	MF	IRL	Thomas Butler
25	MF	ENG	Steven Istead
26	FW	ENG	Andrew Appleby
27	FW	ENG	Jack Wilkinson
28	FW	ENG	James Brown
29	DF	ENG	Carl Jones
33	FW	ENG	David Foley
34	MF	ENG	Michael Maidens
35	MF	ENG	Stephen Turnbull
36	MF	ENG	Phil Turnbull

== Transfers ==
=== Transfers in ===
Date	Position	Player	From	Fee	Ref
30 June 2005	MF	Lee Bullock	Cardiff City	Free	
4 July 2005	MF	Chris Llewellyn	Wrexham	Undisclosed	
11 July 2005	FW	Michael Proctor	Rotherham United	Free	
20 July 2005	DF	Darren Williams	Cardiff City	Free	

=== Loans in ===
Date	Position	Player	From	End date	Ref
12 August 2005	DF	Neill Collins	Sunderland	1 January 2006	
17 November 2005	FW	Dean McDonald	Ipswich Town	17 December 2005	
1 January 2006	FW	James Walker	Charlton Athletic	1 February 2006	
9 January 2006	DF	Gerard Nash	Ipswich Town	9 February 2006	
13 January 2006	FW	Jon-Paul Pittman	Nottingham Forest	13 February 2006	

=== Transfers out ===
Date	Position	Name	To	Fee	Ref
27 June 2005	DF	Chris Westwood	Walsall	Free	
9 August 2005	DF	Jack Ross	Falkirk	Free	

=== Loans out ===
Date	Position	Player	From	End date	Ref
27 September 2005	MF	Darrell Clarke	Port Vale	27 October 2005	
4 November 2005	DF	Neil Wilkinson	Blyth Spartans	4 December 2005	
4 November 2005	GK	James Winter	Gateshead	4 December 2005	
16 December 2005	MF	Phil Turnbull	Gateshead	16 February 2006	
16 December 2005	MF	Stephen Turnbull	Gateshead	16 January 2006	
16 December 2005	FW	Andrew Appleby	Blyth Spartans	16 January 2006	
20 January 2006	DF	Darren Craddock	York City	20 February 2006	
17 March 2006	FW	Jon Daly	Bury	1 June 2006	
4 April 2006	DF	Neil Wilkinson	Whitby Town	1 June 2006	
4 April 2006	FW	Andrew Appleby	Blyth Spartans	1 June 2006	
4 April 2006	FW	Jack Wilkinson	Newcastle Benfield	1 June 2006	

== Results ==
=== Pre-season friendlies ===
13 July 2005	Top Oss	0–1	Hartlepool United	Oss
19:00		Report	Brown	Stadium: Frans Heesen Stadion

15 July 2005	Den Bosch	1–0	Hartlepool United	Den Bosch
19:00		Report		Stadium: De Vliert

20 July 2005	Hartlepool United	3–0	Middlesbrough	Hartlepool
19:00	Llewellyn; Nelson; Clarke	Report		Stadium: Victoria Park; Attendance: 1,796

24 July 2005	York City	0–4	Hartlepool United	York
15:00		Report	Butler; Strachan (pen.); Williams; Brown	Stadium: Bootham Crescent

27 July 2005	Hibernian	1–0	Hartlepool United	Leith
19:00	Sproule 4'	Report		Stadium: Easter Road

29 July 2005	Hartlepool United	0–4	Newcastle United	Hartlepool
19:00		Report	Smylie 18', 80'; Walton 29'; Chopra 38'	Stadium: Victoria Park

=== League One ===
==== League table ====
Pos	Team	Pld	W	D	L	GF	GA	GD	Pts	Qualification or relegation
19	Blackpool	46	12	17	17	56	64	−8	53	
20	Rotherham United	46	12	16	18	52	62	−10	52	
21	Hartlepool United (R)	46	11	17	18	44	59	−15	50	Relegation to League Two
22	Milton Keynes Dons (R)	46	12	14	20	45	66	−21	50	Relegation to League Two
23	Swindon Town (R)	46	11	15	20	46	65	−19	48	Relegation to League Two

Rules for classification: 1) Points; 2) Goal difference; 3) Goals scored
(R) Relegated

==== Results summary ====
Overall								Home						Away					
Pld	W	D	L	GF	GA	GD	Pts	W	D	L	GF	GA	GD	W	D	L	GF	GA	GD
46	11	17	18	44	59	−15	50	6	10	7	28	30	−2	5	7	11	16	29	−13

==== Results by matchday ====
Round	1	2	3	4	5	6	7	8	9	10	11	12	13	14	15	16	17	18	19	20	21	22	23	24	25	26	27	28	29	30	31	32	33	34	35	36	37	38	39	40	41	42	43	44	45	46
Ground	H	A	A	H	A	H	H	A	H	A	H	A	A	H	A	H	H	A	A	H	H	A	A	H	A	H	A	H	A	H	A	H	A	H	H	A	H	A	H	A	A	H	A	H	A	H
Result	L	D	W	D	L	D	L	W	D	L	D	W	L	W	W	W	L	L	W	L	W	L	D	L	L	D	L	D	D	L	D	W	D	D	W	L	D	L	D	D	L	L	L	W	D	D
Position	21	21	14	15	19	17	19	14	16	20	22	18	21	18	16	12	14	15	13	15	12	14	13	15	16	18	18	19	19	21	22	16	17	19	17	17	18	21	20	21	21	21	23	22	21	21

Source: InTheMadCrowd
A = Away; H = Home; W = Win; D = Draw; L = Loss

==== Results ====
6 August 2005 1	Hartlepool United	0–2	Bradford City	Hartlepool
15:00		Report	Windass 8'; Petta 55'	Stadium: Victoria Park; Attendance: 6,271; Referee: Mike Pike

9 August 2005 2	Bournemouth	1–1	Hartlepool United	Bournemouth
19:45	Rodrigues 64'	Report	Bullock 51'	Stadium: Dean Court; Attendance: 5,406; Referee: Trevor Parkes

13 August 2005 3	Doncaster Rovers	0–1	Hartlepool United	Doncaster
15:00		Report	Daly 45'	Stadium: Belle Vue Stadium; Attendance: 5,061; Referee: Graham Salisbury

20 August 2005 4	Hartlepool United	1–1	Walsall	Hartlepool
15:00	Sweeney 63'	Report	Westwood 7'	Stadium: Victoria Park; Attendance: 5,060; Referee: Clive Oliver

27 August 2005 5	Huddersfield Town	2–1	Hartlepool United	Huddersfield
15:00	Abbott 13'; Schofield 18'	Report	Boyd 51'	Stadium: Galpharm Stadium; Attendance: 11,241; Referee: Scott Mathieson

29 August 2005 6	Hartlepool United	3–3	Scunthorpe United	Hartlepool
15:00	Proctor 6'; Williams 71'; Boyd 90' (pen.)	Report	Sharp 8', 50'; Keogh 65'	Stadium: Victoria Park; Attendance: 5,044; Referee: Colin Webster

3 September 2005 7	Hartlepool United	0–1	Yeovil Town	Hartlepool
15:00		Report	Bastianini 68'	Stadium: Victoria Park; Attendance: 4,572; Referee: Darren Drysdale

10 September 2005 8	Blackpool	1–2	Hartlepool United	Blackpool
15:00	Wright 70'	Report	Sweeney 86'; Istead 90'	Stadium: Bloomfield Road; Attendance: 5,494; Referee: Paul Robinson

17 September 2005 9	Hartlepool United	2–2	Swansea City	Hartlepool
15:00	Humphreys 25'; Sweeney 76'	Report	Trundle 56', 61'	Stadium: Victoria Park; Attendance: 4,743; Referee: Anthony Leake

24 September 2005 10	Chesterfield	3–1	Hartlepool United	Chesterfield
15:00	Larkin 54'; Niven 67'; Hall 79'	Report	Proctor 11'	Stadium: Saltergate; Attendance: 4,078; Referee: Ray Olivier

27 September 2005 11	Hartlepool United	0–0	Rotherham United	Hartlepool
19:45		Report		Stadium: Victoria Park; Attendance: 4,309; Referee: Carl Boyeson

1 October 2005 12	Bristol City	0–1	Hartlepool United	Bristol
15:00		Report	Proctor 54'	Stadium: Ashton Gate; Attendance: 11,365; Referee: Iain Williamson

15 October 2005 13	Nottingham Forest	2–0	Hartlepool United	Nottingham
15:00	Taylor 34'; Bopp 90' (pen.)	Report		Stadium: City Ground; Attendance: 17,586; Referee: Carl Boyeson

22 October 2005 14	Hartlepool United	2–1	Milton Keynes Dons	Hartlepool
15:00	Lewington 50' (o.g.); Bullock 84'	Report	McLeod 24'	Stadium: Victoria Park; Attendance: 4,337; Referee: Colin Webster

29 October 2005 15	Port Vale	1–2	Hartlepool United	Burslem
15:00	Cummins 43'	Report	Williams 12'; Butler 64'	Stadium: Vale Park; Attendance: 4,550; Referee: Lee Probert

1 November 2005 16	Hartlepool United	3–1	Gillingham	Hartlepool
19:45	Daly 15'; Sweeney 50'; Bullock 86'	Report	Collin 90'	Stadium: Victoria Park; Attendance: 4,522; Referee: Lee Mason

12 November 2005 17	Hartlepool United	1–2	Brentford	Hartlepool
15:00	Sweeney 72'	Report	Campbell 22'; Owusu 78'	Stadium: Victoria Park; Attendance: 4,811; Referee: Uriah Rennie

19 November 2005 18	Gillingham	1–0	Hartlepool United	Gillingham
15:00	Shields 10'	Report		Stadium: Priestfield Stadium; Attendance: 6,092; Referee: Darren Deadman

26 November 2005 19	Bradford City	0–1	Hartlepool United	Bradford
15:00		Report	Tinkler 34'	Stadium: Valley Parade; Attendance: 7,499; Referee: Neil Swarbrick

6 December 2005 20	Hartlepool United	0–1	Colchester United	Hartlepool
19:45		Report	Cureton 59'	Stadium: Victoria Park; Attendance: 3,375; Referee: Mike Dean

10 December 2005 21	Hartlepool United	2–1	Bournemouth	Hartlepool
15:00	Istead 28'; McDonald 39'	Report	Foley-Sheridan 68'	Stadium: Victoria Park; Attendance: 3,755; Referee: Paul Robinson

17 December 2005 22	Walsall	1–0	Hartlepool United	Walsall
15:00	Fryatt 85'	Report		Stadium: Bescot Stadium; Attendance: 4,293; Referee: Jarnail Singh

26 December 2005 23	Barnsley	1–1	Hartlepool United	Barnsley
15:00	Richards 28' (pen.)	Report	Williams 50'	Stadium: Oakwell; Attendance: 9,715; Referee: Phil Joslin

28 December 2005 24	Hartlepool United	1–2	Southend United	Hartlepool
19:45	Williams 20'	Report	Eastwood 32'; Gray 85' (pen.)	Stadium: Victoria Park; Attendance: 3,929; Referee: Andy Hall

31 December 2005 25	Oldham Athletic	2–1	Hartlepool United	Oldham
15:00	Beckett 37'; Liddell 61'	Report	Williams 75'	Stadium: Boundary Park; Attendance: 5,047; Referee: Russell Booth

2 January 2006 26	Hartlepool United	1–1	Swindon Town	Hartlepool
15:00	Strachan 36'	Report	Fallon 78'	Stadium: Victoria Park; Attendance: 4,169; Referee: Neil Swarbrick

7 January 2006 27	Yeovil Town	2–0	Hartlepool United	Yeovil
15:00	Jevons 26', 60'	Report		Stadium: Huish Park; Attendance: 5,480; Referee: Paul Melin

14 January 2006 28	Hartlepool United	0–0	Tranmere Rovers	Hartlepool
15:00		Report		Stadium: Victoria Park; Attendance: 4,181; Referee: Kevin Wright

21 January 2006 29	Swansea City	1–1	Hartlepool United	Swansea
15:00	Britton 20'	Report	Williams 90'	Stadium: Liberty Stadium; Attendance: 13,960; Referee: Lee Probert

28 January 2006 30	Hartlepool United	0–3	Blackpool	Hartlepool
15:00		Report	Clarke 28' (pen.), 74' (pen.); Parker 82'	Stadium: Victoria Park; Attendance: 4,421; Referee: Carl Boyeson

4 February 2006 31	Rotherham United	0–0	Hartlepool United	Rotherham
15:00		Report		Stadium: Millmoor; Attendance: 5,960; Referee: Anthony Leake

10 February 2006 32	Hartlepool United	1–0	Chesterfield	Hartlepool
19:45	Robson 65'	Report		Stadium: Victoria Park; Attendance: 4,596; Referee: Gary Sutton

14 February 2006 33	Tranmere Rovers	0–0	Hartlepool United	Birkenhead
19:45		Report		Stadium: Prenton Park; Attendance: 6,301; Referee: Phil Joslin

25 February 2006 34	Hartlepool United	1–1	Doncaster Rovers	Hartlepool
15:00	Boyd 20'	Report	McCormack 90'	Stadium: Victoria Park; Attendance: 5,459; Referee: Lee Mason

10 March 2006 35	Hartlepool United	3–1	Huddersfield Town	Hartlepool
19:45	Boyd 10'; Maidens 53'; Porter 82'	Report	Graham 22'	Stadium: Victoria Park; Attendance: 5,468; Referee: Mike Jones

14 March 2006 36	Scunthorpe United	2–0	Hartlepool United	Scunthorpe
19:45	Baraclough 44'; Sparrow 70'	Report		Stadium: Glanford Park; Attendance: 4,550; Referee: Mike Pike

18 March 2006 37	Hartlepool United	1–1	Barnsley	Hartlepool
15:00	Porter 9'	Report	Kay 36'	Stadium: Victoria Park; Attendance: 5,122; Referee: Graham Laws

25 March 2006 38	Southend United	3–0	Hartlepool United	Southend
15:00	Gower 1'; Eastwood 50', 71'	Report		Stadium: Roots Hall; Attendance: 8,496; Referee: Jarnail Singh

31 March 2006 39	Hartlepool United	1–1	Oldham Athletic	Hartlepool
19:45	Bullock 9'	Report	Beckett 45' (pen.)	Stadium: Victoria Park; Attendance: 5,259; Referee: Kevin Friend

8 April 2006 40	Swindon Town	1–1	Hartlepool United	Swindon
15:00	Peacock 54'	Report	Humphreys 31'	Stadium: County Ground; Attendance: 5,225; Referee: Keith Stroud

11 April 2006 41	Colchester United	2–0	Hartlepool United	Colchester
19:45	Danns 83', 90'	Report		Stadium: Layer Road; Attendance: 3,916; Referee: Trevor Kettle

15 April 2006 42	Hartlepool United	1–2	Bristol City	Hartlepool
15:00	Williams 83'	Report	Noble 13'; Russell 38'	Stadium: Victoria Park; Attendance: 5,039; Referee: Neil Swarbrick

17 April 2006 43	Milton Keynes Dons	2–1	Hartlepool United	Milton Keynes
15:00	Wilbraham 25'; Taylor 90'	Report	Proctor 50'	Stadium: National Hockey Stadium; Attendance: 6,472; Referee: Steve Tanner

22 April 2006 44	Hartlepool United	3–2	Nottingham Forest	Hartlepool
15:00	Porter 32'; Nelson 59'; Proctor 60'	Report	Tyson 15'; Commons 67'	Stadium: Victoria Park; Attendance: 5,336; Referee: Paul Robinson

29 April 2006 45	Brentford	1–1	Hartlepool United	Brentford
15:00	O'Connor 84'	Report	Nelson 90'	Stadium: Griffin Park; Attendance: 8,725; Referee: Mike Thorpe

6 May 2006 46	Hartlepool United	1–1	Port Vale	Hartlepool
15:00	Brown 86'	Report	Cummins 77'	Stadium: Victoria Park; Attendance: 6,895; Referee: Russell Booth

=== FA Cup ===
5 November 2005 First round	Hartlepool United	2–1	Dagenham & Redbridge	Hartlepool
15:00	Nelson 34'; Butler 83'	Report	Kandol 32'	Stadium: Victoria Park; Attendance: 3,655; Referee: Gary Sutton

3 December 2005 Second round	Hartlepool United	1–2	Tamworth	Hartlepool
15:00	Llewellyn 52' (pen.)	Report	Edwards 33'; Redmile 48'	Stadium: Victoria Park; Attendance: 3,786; Referee: Graham Salisbury

=== League Cup ===
23 August 2005 First round	Hartlepool United	3–1	Darlington	Hartlepool
19:45	Daly 26'; Proctor 76', 88'	Report	Logan 81'	Stadium: Victoria Park; Attendance: 6,163; Referee: Nigel Miller

20 September 2005 Second round	Charlton Athletic	3–1	Hartlepool United	Charlton
19:45	Johansson 43' (pen.); Bent 74'; Bothroyd 80'	Report	Daly 40'	Stadium: The Valley; Attendance: 10,328; Referee: Grant Hegley

=== Football League Trophy ===
18 October 2005 First round	Scunthorpe United	1–0	Hartlepool United	Scunthorpe
19:45	Crosby 85' (pen.)	Report		Stadium: Glanford Park; Attendance: 2,028; Referee: Grant Hegley

== Squad statistics ==
=== Appearances and goals ===
No.	Pos	Nat	Player	Total		League One		FA Cup		League Cup		Other	
No.	Pos	Nat	Player	Apps	Goals	Apps	Goals	Apps	Goals	Apps	Goals	Apps	Goals
1	GK	(Greece) GRE	Dimitrios Konstantopoulos	51	0	46	0	2	0	2	0	1	0
2	DF	(England) ENG	Michael Barron	15	0	15	0	0	0	0	0	0	0
3	DF	(Scotland) SCO	Hugh Robertson	2	0	2	0	0	0	0	0	0	0
4	MF	(England) ENG	Mark Tinkler	18	1	15	1	1	0	1	0	1	0
5	DF	(England) ENG	Michael Nelson	47	3	43	2	2	1	2	0	0	0
6	FW	(England) ENG	Michael Proctor	29	7	26	5	1	0	2	2	0	0
7	MF	(Wales) WAL	Chris Llewellyn	32	1	29	0	1	1	1	0	1	0
8	MF	(England) ENG	Ritchie Humphreys	50	2	46	2	2	0	2	0	0	0
9	FW	(Australia) AUS	Joel Porter	8	3	8	3	0	0	0	0	0	0
10	FW	(England) ENG	Adam Boyd	22	4	21	4	0	0	1	0	0	0
11	FW	(Wales) WAL	Eifion Williams	39	7	36	7	2	0	0	0	1	0
12	MF	(Scotland) SCO	Gavin Strachan	10	1	9	1	0	0	1	0	0	0
14	FW	(Republic of Ireland) IRL	Jon Daly	33	4	30	2	1	0	2	2	0	0
15	MF	(England) ENG	Antony Sweeney	40	5	35	5	2	0	2	0	1	0
16	DF	(England) ENG	Ben Clark	34	0	32	0	1	0	0	0	1	0
17	MF	(England) ENG	Darrell Clarke	12	0	12	0	0	0	0	0	0	0
18	DF	(England) ENG	Matty Robson	20	1	19	1	0	0	1	0	0	0
19	DF	(England) ENG	John Brackstone	4	0	2	0	1	0	0	0	1	0
20	DF	(England) ENG	Darren Craddock	7	0	4	0	2	0	0	0	1	0
22	MF	(England) ENG	Lee Bullock	34	4	31	4	1	0	1	0	1	0
23	DF	(England) ENG	Darren Williams	43	0	39	0	2	0	2	0	0	0
24	MF	(Republic of Ireland) IRL	Thomas Butler	33	2	28	1	2	1	2	0	1	0
25	MF	(England) ENG	Steven Istead	14	2	10	2	2	0	1	0	1	0
28	FW	(England) ENG	James Brown	4	1	4	1	0	0	0	0	0	0
29	DF	(England) ENG	Carl Jones	2	0	1	0	0	0	0	0	1	0
32	DF	(Scotland) SCO	Neill Collins	25	0	22	0	0	0	2	0	1	0
32	DF	(Republic of Ireland) IRL	Gerard Nash	3	0	3	0	0	0	0	0	0	0
33	FW	(England) ENG	David Foley	12	0	11	0	1	0	0	0	0	0
34	MF	(England) ENG	Michael Maidens	22	1	20	1	1	0	1	0	0	0
36	MF	(England) ENG	Stephen Turnbull	22	0	21	0	0	0	1	0	0	0
37	FW	(England) ENG	Dean McDonald	6	1	5	1	1	0	0	0	0	0
37	FW	(England) ENG	James Walker	4	0	4	0	0	0	0	0	0	0
38	FW	(United States) USA	Jon-Paul Pittman	3	0	3	0	0	0	0	0	0	0

=== Goalscorers ===
Rank	Name	League One	FA Cup	League Cup	Other	Total
1	Michael Proctor	5	0	2	0	7
1	Eifion Williams	7	0	0	0	7
2	Antony Sweeney	5	0	0	0	5
3	Adam Boyd	4	0	0	0	4
3	Lee Bullock	4	0	0	0	4
3	Jon Daly	2	0	2	0	4
4	Michael Nelson	2	1	0	0	3
4	Joel Porter	3	0	0	0	3
5	Thomas Butler	1	1	0	1	2
5	Ritchie Humphreys	2	0	0	0	2
5	Steven Istead	2	0	0	0	2
6	James Brown	1	0	0	0	1
6	Chris Llewellyn	1	0	0	0	1
6	Michael Maidens	1	0	0	0	1
6	Dean McDonald	1	0	0	0	1
6	Matty Robson	1	0	0	0	0
6	Gavin Strachan	1	0	0	0	1
6	Mark Tinkler	1	0	0	0	1

=== Clean Sheets ===
Rank	Name	League One	FA Cup	League Cup	Other	Total
1	Dimitrios Konstantopoulos	8	0	0	0	8

=== Penalties ===
Date	Name	Opposition	Scored?
29 August 2005	Adam Boyd	Scunthorpe United	✓
3 December 2005	Chris Llewellyn	Tamworth	✓
28 December 2005	Chris Llewellyn	Southend United	✗
28 January 2006	Adam Boyd	Blackpool	✗

=== Suspensions ===
Date Incurred	Name	Games Missed	Reason
15 October 2005	Michael Nelson	3	(red card) (vs. Nottingham Forest)
18 October 2005	Ben Clark	3	(red card) (vs. Scunthorpe United)
22 October 2005	Mark Tinkler	3	(red card) (vs. Milton Keynes Dons)
19 November 2005	Thomas Butler	1	(yellow card) (yellow card) (red card) (vs. Gillingham)
14 January 2006	Chris Llewellyn	3	(red card) (vs. Tranmere Rovers)
28 January 2006	Michael Barron	3	(red card) (vs. Blackpool)
11 April 2006	Darren Williams	1	(yellow card) (yellow card) (red card) (vs. Colchester United)
