= 2005–06 Sheffield Wednesday F.C. season =

English football club season

Sheffield Wednesday
2005–06 season
- Chairman: Dave Allen
- Manager: Paul Sturrock
- Stadium: Hillsborough
- Championship: 19th
- FA Cup: Third round
- League Cup: Second round
- Top goalscorer: Chris Brunt (7)
- Highest home attendance: 33,439 vs Sheffield United (18 Feb 2006, Championship)
- Lowest home attendance: 14,851 vs Charlton Athletic (7 Jan 2006, FA Cup)
- Average home league attendance: 24,853

During the 2005–06 English football season, Sheffield Wednesday F.C. competed in the Football League Championship.

== Season summary ==
In the 2005–06 Championship campaign, the Owls' final league position of 19th place wasn't bad considering the current financial situation of the club. For the second successive year targets have been achieved – the season's target had been avoiding relegation.

On 17 April 2006, Sheffield Wednesday retained their place in the Championship with two matches remaining, with a 2–0 away win at Brighton, condemning Brighton, Millwall and Crewe to the drop in the process. Wednesday went on to finish the season in 19th place, 10 points clear of the relegation zone.

Wednesday were statistically the best supported team in the Championship with their average home league attendance of 24,853 marginally beating newly relegated Norwich City with 24,833.

== Final league table ==
Pos	Team	Pld	W	D	L	GF	GA	GD	Pts
17	Burnley	46	14	12	20	46	54	−8	54
18	Hull City	46	12	16	18	49	55	−6	52
19	Sheffield Wednesday	46	13	13	20	39	52	−13	52
20	Derby County	46	10	20	16	53	67	−14	50
21	Queens Park Rangers	46	12	14	20	50	65	−15	50

Updated to match(es) played on 2 December 2011. Source: RSSSF
Rules for classification: 1) points; 2) goal difference; 3) number of goals scored.

== Results ==
Sheffield Wednesday's score comes first

=== Legend ===
Win	Draw	Loss

=== Football League Championship ===
Date	Opponent	Venue	Result	Attendance	Scorers
6 August 2005	Stoke City	A	0–0	18,744	
9 August 2005	Hull City	H	1–1	29,910	Best
13 August 2005	Southampton	H	0–1	26,688	
20 August 2005	Ipswich Town	A	1–2	24,238	Peacock
26 August 2005	Queens Park Rangers	A	0–0	12,131	
10 September 2005	Leicester City	A	0–2	22,618	
13 September 2005	Leeds United	H	1–0	29,986	Eagles
17 September 2005	Millwall	H	1–2	22,446	Coughlan
23 September 2005	Luton Town	A	2–2	8,267	Lee, Graham
27 September 2005	Crystal Palace	A	0–2	17,413	
1 October 2005	Coventry City	H	3–2	22,732	Coughlan, Brunt (2, 1 pen)
15 October 2005	Plymouth Argyle	A	1–1	16,534	Buzsáky (own goal)
18 October 2005	Watford	H	1–1	21,187	Brunt
24 October 2005	Brighton & Hove Albion	H	1–1	21,787	Peacock
29 October 2005	Norwich City	A	1–0	25,383	Brunt
1 November 2005	Reading	A	0–2	16,188	
5 November 2005	Derby County	H	2–1	26,334	Brunt, Graham
9 November 2005	Cardiff City	H	1–3	20,324	Eagles
19 November 2005	Watford	A	1–2	16,988	Whelan
22 November 2005	Plymouth Argyle	H	0–0	20,244	
26 November 2005	Stoke City	H	0–2	21,970	
3 December 2005	Sheffield United	A	0–1	30,558	
10 December 2005	Hull City	A	0–1	21,329	
17 December 2005	Ipswich Town	H	0–1	21,716	
26 December 2005	Preston North End	A	0–0	18,867	
28 December 2005	Wolverhampton Wanderers	H	0–2	24,295	
31 December 2005	Burnley	A	2–1	14,607	Eagles, Coughlan
2 January 2006	Crewe Alexandra	H	3–0	25,656	Wood, Tudgay, McCready (own goal)
14 January 2006	Leicester City	H	2–1	25,398	Brunt, Coughlan
21 January 2006	Leeds United	A	0–3	27,843	
31 January 2006	Luton Town	H	0–2	23,965	
4 February 2006	Millwall	A	1–0	11,896	Simek
11 February 2006	Crystal Palace	H	0–0	24,784	
15 February 2006	Coventry City	A	1–2	20,021	Brunt
18 February 2006	Sheffield United	H	1–2	33,439	MacLean (pen)
25 February 2006	Southampton	A	0–3	26,236	
4 March 2006	Cardiff City	A	0–1	11,851	
11 March 2006	Queens Park Rangers	H	1–1	22,788	Burton
18 March 2006	Preston North End	H	2–0	23,429	Burton, O'Brien
25 March 2006	Wolverhampton Wanderers	A	3–1	25,161	Tudgay (2), Burton
1 April 2006	Burnley	H	0–0	24,485	
8 April 2006	Crewe Alexandra	A	0–2	8,007	
15 April 2006	Norwich City	H	1–0	30,755	Tudgay
17 April 2006	Brighton & Hove Albion	A	2–0	7,573	Hart (own goal), O'Brien
22 April 2006	Reading	H	1–1	27,307	MacLean (pen)
30 April 2006	Derby County	A	2–0	30,391	Tudgay, Best

=== FA Cup ===
Round	Date	Opponent	Venue	Result	Attendance	Goalscorers
R3	7 January 2006	Charlton Athletic	H	2–4	14,851	Heckingbottom (2)

=== League Cup ===
Round	Date	Opponent	Venue	Result	Attendance	Goalscorers
R1	23 August 2005	Stockport County	A	4–2	3,001	Peacock, Partridge, Proudlock (2)
R2	20 September 2005	West Ham United	H	2–4	14,976	Coughlan, Graham

== Squad ==
Note: Flags indicate national team as defined under FIFA eligibility rules; some limited exceptions apply. Players may hold more than one non-FIFA nationality.

No.	Pos.	Nation	Player
1	GK	ENG	David Lucas
2	DF	SCO	Lee Bullen
4	MF	TOG	Yoann Folly (on loan from Southampton)
5	DF	IRL	Graham Coughlan
6	MF	IRL	Glenn Whelan
7	MF	SCO	Jon-Paul McGovern
8	MF	SCO	Burton O'Brien
9	FW	SCO	Steve MacLean
10	FW	IRL	Leon Best (on loan from Southampton)
11	MF	NIR	Chris Brunt
12	DF	ENG	Patrick Collins
14	DF	ENG	John Hills
15	DF	ENG	Steve Adams
16	DF	ENG	Richard Wood
17	DF	GUI	Drissa Diallo
18	MF	IRL	Ritchie Partridge

No.	Pos.	Nation	Player
19	FW	JAM	Deon Burton
20	DF	USA	Frankie Simek
21	GK	ENG	Chris Adamson
22	GK	ENG	Scott Carson (on loan from Liverpool)
23	MF	GRN	Craig Rocastle
25	FW	ENG	Drew Talbot
26	FW	IRL	Barry Corr
27	GK	ENG	Ben Kirby
29	DF	DEN	Mikkel Bischoff (on loan from Manchester City)
30	FW	SCO	David Graham
32	DF	ENG	Tommy Spurr
33	MF	ENG	Sean McAllister
35	DF	WAL	Peter Gilbert
38	MF	ENG	Matt Thorpe
40	FW	ENG	Marcus Tudgay
-	DF	ENG	Rory McArdle

=== Left club during season ===
Note: Flags indicate national team as defined under FIFA eligibility rules; some limited exceptions apply. Players may hold more than one non-FIFA nationality.

No.	Pos.	Nation	Player
3	DF	ENG	Paul Heckingbottom (to Barnsley)
4	DF	ENG	Graeme Lee (to Doncaster Rovers)
10	FW	SCO	Lee Peacock (to Swindon Town)
19	MF	ENG	Chris Eagles (on loan from Manchester United)
22	GK	ENG	Nicky Weaver (on loan from Manchester City)
24	DF	SCO	Maurice Ross (to Wolverhampton Wanderers)

No.	Pos.	Nation	Player
27	MF	WAL	Richard Evans (to Shrewsbury Town)
28	FW	ENG	Gabriel Agbonlahor (on loan from Aston Villa)
29	FW	IRL	Daryl Murphy (on loan from Sunderland)
31	FW	ENG	Adam Proudlock (to Ipswich Town)
34	FW	ENG	Danny Reet (to Mansfield Town)
