= Michael Maidens =

British footballer

- Maidens with Hartlepool United

Personal information
- Full name: Michael Douglas Maidens
- Date of birth: 7 May 1987
- Place of birth: Middlesbrough, England
- Date of death: 19 October 2007 (aged 20)
- Place of death: Lazenby, England
- Height: 5 ft 11 in (1.80 m)
- Position: Midfielder

Youth career
- –2004: Hartlepool United

Senior career*
| Years | Team | Apps | (Gls) |
| 2004–2007 | Hartlepool United | 25 | (1) |
| 2007 | → York City (loan) | 3 | (0) |
| 2007 | → Blyth Spartans (loan) | 7 | (1) |
| Total | | 35 | (2) |
- * Club domestic league appearances and goals

Michael Douglas Maidens (7 May 1987 – 19 October 2007) was a British professional footballer who played as a midfielder. He started his career with Hartlepool United in 2004, making his debut in the League Cup against Crystal Palace in September 2004.

He joined York City on a one-month loan in January 2007 and made three appearances in the Conference National. He joined Blyth Spartans on loan during the 2007–08 season and made seven appearances and scored one goal for them in Conference North.

== Career ==
Born in Middlesbrough, North Yorkshire, Maidens started his career as a trainee with Hartlepool United and in 2001 was placed on standby for The Football Association's "Under-15 Schoolboy Development Course", before being given a full call-up. His first team debut came on 21 September 2004 when he was a late substitute for Gavin Strachan in the 2–1 League Cup defeat away to Crystal Palace. A month later, on 30 October 2004, he made his league debut in the 1–0 home win against Port Vale. He scored Hartlepool's goal of the season in the 2005–06 season, a curling effort in a 3–1 victory over Huddersfield Town in March 2006. He signed a professional contract with Hartlepool on 4 July 2006.

Maidens joined Conference National side York City on a one-month loan on 19 January 2007. He made three appearances for the club.

He joined Blyth Spartans on loan in time for the start of the 2007–08 season and scored on his Conference North debut, a 2–0 win at home to Alfreton Town. He made seven appearances and scored one goal for the club.

== Death ==
On 20 October 2007, Hartlepool United announced that Maidens had died in a road traffic accident. He was a passenger in a vehicle which lost control and collided with a metal post near a roundabout on the A174 near Lazenby, North Yorkshire at 20.25 hours on 19 October 2007. Both their youth team game and their league game against Swansea City were postponed as a mark of respect. The postponement was fully backed by Swansea City and the Football League.

Swansea City and Hartlepool players paid tribute to Maidens on 21 October 2007. Hartlepool retired Maidens' number 25 shirt. Hartlepool United later named their Goal of the Season Award 'The Michael Maidens Goal of the Season Award' in honour of Maidens scoring Hartlepool's Goal of the Season in 2006.

== Career statistics ==
Appearances and goals by club, season and competition
| Club | Season | League | | | FA Cup | | League Cup | | Other | | Total | |
| Club | Season | Division | Apps | Goals | Apps | Goals | Apps | Goals | Apps | Goals | Apps | Goals |
|---|---|---|---|---|---|---|---|---|---|---|---|---|
| Hartlepool United | 2004–05 | League One | 1 | 0 | 0 | 0 | 1 | 0 | 0 | 0 | 2 | 0 |
| Hartlepool United | 2005–06 | League One | 20 | 1 | 1 | 0 | 0 | 0 | 1 (Note: Appearance(s) in Football League Trophy) | 0 | 22 | 1 |
| Hartlepool United | 2006–07 | League Two | 4 | 0 | 1 | 0 | 0 | 0 | 2 | 0 | 7 | 0 |
| Hartlepool United | Total | | 25 | 1 | 2 | 0 | 1 | 0 | 3 | 0 | 31 | 1 |
| York City (loan) | 2006–07 | Conference National | 3 | 0 | — | | — | | — | | 3 | 0 |
| Blyth Spartans (loan) | 2007–08 | Conference North | 7 | 1 | — | | — | | — | | 7 | 1 |
| Career total | | | 35 | 2 | 2 | 0 | 1 | 0 | 3 | 0 | 41 | 2 |
