= Michael Proctor (footballer) =

British footballer (born 1980)

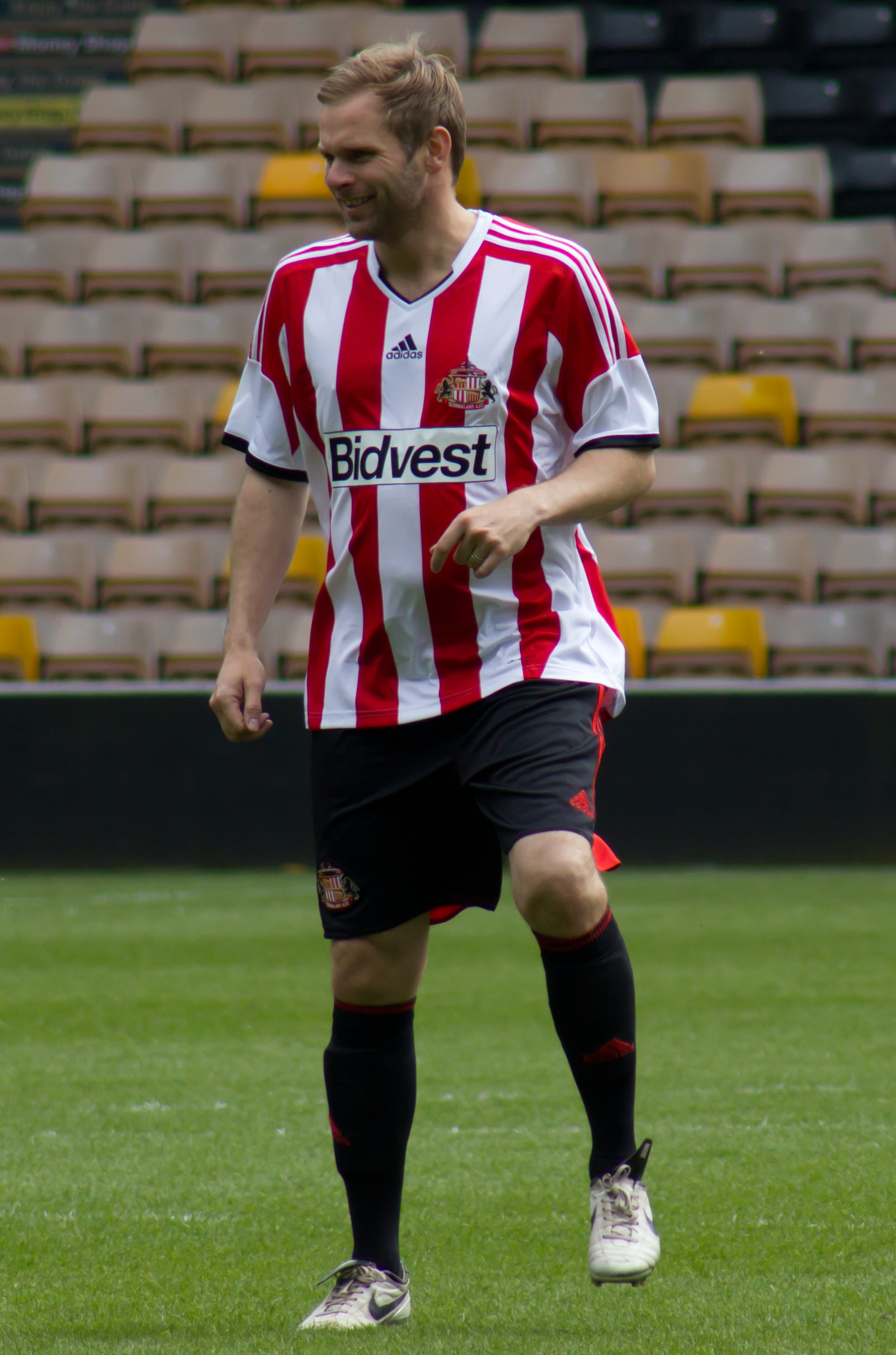
- Proctor playing for Sunderland in Jody Craddock's testimonial match in 2014

Personal information
- Full name: Michael Anthony Proctor
- Date of birth: 3 October 1980 (age 46)
- Place of birth: Sunderland, England
- Height: 5 ft 11 in (1.80 m)
- Position: Striker

Team information
- Current team: Sunderland (first-team coach)

Youth career
- –1997: Sunderland

Senior career*
Years	Team	Apps	(Gls)
1997–2004	Sunderland	38	(3)
2000–2001	→ Hvidovre (loan)	5	(1)
2001	→ Halifax Town (loan)	12	(4)
2001–2002	→ York City (loan)	41	(14)
2002	→ Bradford City (loan)	12	(4)
2004–2005	Rotherham United	45	(7)
2005	→ Swindon Town (loan)	4	(2)
2005–2007	Hartlepool United	28	(5)
2007	→ Wrexham (loan)	9	(2)
2007–2009	Wrexham	58	(12)
Total		252	(54)
- * Club domestic league appearances and goals

Michael Anthony Proctor (born 3 October 1980) is an English professional football coach and former player who played as a striker. He is first-team coach at Premier League club Sunderland.

== Playing career ==
=== Sunderland Debut and Loan Moves ===
Born in Sunderland, Tyne and Wear, Proctor started his career with his hometown club Sunderland in their youth system and signed a professional contract with them on 29 October 1997. He made his first team debut for Sunderland against Everton in the League Cup on 11 November 1998, which finished as a 1–1 draw. He was loaned to Danish side Hvidovre in 2000 to recuperate from a cruciate ligament injury. He joined Halifax Town on loan in March 2001, making his debut against Cheltenham Town, in which he scored in a 4–2 win. He finished this loan spell with four goals in 12 appearances. He played at York City on loan during the 2001–02 season, making his debut in a 1–0 defeat against Rushden & Diamonds. He finished this spell with 49 appearances and 14 goals, making him York's top scorer for the season. He joined Bradford City on loan in August 2002. He scored the winning goal on his debut as Bradford defeated Ipswich Town 2–1, and became a favourite among fans, players, and the board. He scored a total of four goals in 12 games during his two-month spell, including a late equaliser as nine-man City drew 2–2 with Burnley, but he returned to Sunderland when manager Howard Wilkinson blocked another month's extension to the loan.

=== Sunderland ===
He scored his first Premier League goal for Sunderland in their 2–1 victory over Liverpool on 15 December 2002, a rare, televised highlight in an otherwise disappointing season that ended in relegation. His strike proved to be the winning goal.

He scored his second Premier League goal just two weeks later on Boxing Day, to put Sunderland ahead against Leeds. But the visitors turned the game round to win 2-1 in a game which saw James Milner become the youngest ever goalscorer in the history of the Premier League, beating a record set by Wayne Rooney just a couple of months earlier.

Sunderland’s struggles that season were epitomised by an extraordinary and unfortunate 3–1 defeat to Charlton Athletic in February 2003, when all three Charlton goals were own goals conceded by Sunderland in a remarkable six-minute spell. Stephen Wright scored one, while Proctor was responsible for two.

For years, Proctor found this match difficult to discuss, describing it as the lowest point of his life. He eventually spoke openly about the incident after Sunderland’s 8–0 loss to Southampton on 18 October 2014, a game that also featured three own goals. Appearing on the Wise Men Say podcast, which he was involved with at the time, Proctor explained his frustration, noting that as a forward he had only been defending in the box because others lacked the desire or attitude to do so.

=== Rotherham United ===
Proctor left Sunderland in February 2004, joining Rotherham United in a swap deal for Darren Byfield.

He joined Swindon Town on a month's loan deal in February 2005 and make a quick, but short impact. When Swindon could not afford to extend his loan at the club, he returned to Rotherham in March.

=== Hartlepool United ===
He later moved to Hartlepool United on a free transfer in July 2005. He was best remembered by Hartlepool fans for scoring twice in a 3–1 over local rivals Darlington in a League Cup tie early in his Pools' career. He played just 32 games in two seasons for Hartlepool, scoring ten goals, before he was one of ten players released by Danny Wilson.

=== Wrexham ===
Proctor joined League Two club Wrexham on a month's loan in March 2007. This loan was extended until the end of the 2006–07 season in April. During this spell he scored two vital goals for Wrexham in their eventually successful survival bid. These were the winning goal in the 1–0 victory at local rivals Shrewsbury Town and the third goal in the Welsh club's 3–1 victory over Boston United which preserved the club's Football League status. He was released by Hartlepool in May 2007 and expressed an interest in joining Wrexham permanently. This move was confirmed in May 2007. He was transfer listed by Wrexham in May 2008 following the club's relegation to the Football Conference, despite finishing the season as the club's top scorer with 12 goals. In the summer of 2009 after talks with manager Dean Saunders, Proctor left the club by mutual consent.

== Media career ==
From the start of the 2014–15 season, Michael began to work as a co-host for Sun FM's into The Light football show, discussing all things Sunderland with the duo of Stephen Goldsmith and Gareth Barker of the Wise Men Say Podcast; Proctor added expert opinion to the comments of Goldsmith and Barker. This isn't an area of work Michael had intentionally planned on getting into after retiring, as he had previously been involved in coaching at East Durham College. Upon becoming a frequent visitor to the Stadium of Light to undergo his media duties, Michael begun to work closer with the Sunderland media team, most notably interviewing Jermain Defoe about his winning goal in a game against fierce rivals Newcastle United.

== Coaching career ==
Proctor returned to part-time session coaching with Sunderland’s academy while still a member of the Wise Men Say Podcast, but stepped aside from all media work to return to full-time coaching after Sunderland’s relegation from the Premier League. He was appointed manager of the Under 15’s and 16’s, while also assisting with the Under 23’s in 2018.

By February 2022, Sunderland were in their fourth successive season in League One and sacked manager Lee Johnson after a 6-0 defeat at Bolton Wanderers. It was announced that the Under 23 manager Mike Dodds would team up with Proctor, his assistant, to jointly take charge of the first team on an interim basis.

Sunderland lost both games of this interim period but the duo impressed new manager Alex Neil and were appointed to the first-team coaching staff in July 2022 after Sunderland had won promotion back to the Championship.

When Tony Mowbray was sacked as Sunderland manager in December 2023, Mike Dodds stepped up to take interim charge with Proctor acting as his assistant.

This time results were better for the pair, winning two of the three games, including a win over promotion chasing Leeds where the tactical performance of the victory was widely praised, with first team players claiming that the duo were ‘incredible people’ who had been ‘nothing short of phenomenal’ in their coaching of the players.

Despite some calls for the temporary management team to be given the job on a full-time basis, Michael Beale was appointed soon after, with Sporting Director Kristjaan Speakman once more talking up the importance of Proctor and Dodds to the first team, confirming further promotions to their senior roles.

Beale’s reign in charge was seen as a disaster, with many fans calling for his removal after just a few weeks. Indeed, Proctor’s old podcast Wise Men Say did a poll just 7 weeks into his tenure, where 91.4% of fans called for his sacking.

Once Beale was removed from position on 19 February 2024, Dodds took control with Proctor as his assistant for the second time, with it being the third time they had managed the team as a pairing. They took the job for the remainder of the season.

In the summer of 2024, Sunderland appointed Regis Le Bris as Head Coach, a relatively unknown manager after seemingly missing out on a few other targets, most notably Will Still. After a fast start that had Sunderland top of the Championship in October, Le Bris appointed a new assistant, Pedro Ribeiro, but continued to stress the importance of having both Proctor and Dodds around the first team.

When Dodds left to take over the manager’s job at Wycombe Wanderers, Le Bris expressed his regret at losing one of the respected duo before later making a point of singling out praise for Proctor’s coaching.

After winning promotion back to the Premier League, after a club record absence of eight years, Sunderland revamped the first team coaching staff to adapt to the step up. Luciano Vulcano, Isidre Ramón Madir and Neil Cutler came in to the club, while Pedro Ribeiro departed. Proctor kept his place in the first team coaching structure ready for the return of top flight football in August 2025.

== Personal life ==
Proctor is the father of Tom Proctor, also a professional footballer. Like Michael, Tom has now represented his boyhood team, Sunderland, and made his competitive debut in the 2026/27 season.

== Career statistics ==
Appearances and goals by club, season and competition
Club	Season	League			FA Cup		League Cup		Other		Total	
Club	Season	Division	Apps	Goals	Apps	Goals	Apps	Goals	Apps	Goals	Apps	Goals
Sunderland	1998–99	First Division	0	0	0	0	1	0	0	0	1	0
Sunderland	1999–00	Premier League	0	0	0	0	0	0	0	0	0	0
Sunderland	2000–01	Premier League	0	0	0	0	0	0	0	0	0	0
Sunderland	2001–02	Premier League	0	0	0	0	0	0	0	0	0	0
Sunderland	2002–03	Premier League	21	2	5	2	2	0	0	0	28	4
Sunderland	2003–04	First Division	17	1	1	0	1	0	0	0	19	1
Sunderland	Total		38	3	6	2	4	0	0	0	48	5
Hvidovre (loan)	2000-01	Danish 1st Division	5	1	0	0	0	0	0	0	5	1
Halifax Town (loan)	2000–01	Division Three	12	4	0	0	0	0	0	0	12	4
York City (loan)	2001–02	Division Three	41	14	6	0	1	0	1	0	49	14
Bradford City (loan)	2002–03	First Division	12	4	0	0	0	0	0	0	12	4
Rotherham United	2003–04	First Division	17	6	0	0	0	0	0	0	17	6
Rotherham United	2004–05	Championship	28	1	1	0	2	1	0	0	31	2
Rotherham United	Total		45	7	1	0	2	1	0	0	48	8
Swindon Town (loan)	2004–05	League One	4	2	0	0	0	0	0	0	4	2
Hartlepool United	2005–06	League One	26	5	1	0	2	2	0	0	29	7
Hartlepool United	2006–07	League Two	2	0	0	0	1	0	0	0	3	0
Hartlepool United	Total		28	5	1	0	3	2	0	0	32	7
Wrexham	2006–07	League Two	9	2	0	0	0	0	0	0	9	2
Wrexham	2007–08	League Two	40	11	0	0	2	1	0	0	42	12
Wrexham	2008–09	Conference Premier	18	1	0	0	0	0	0	0	18	1
Wrexham	Total		67	14	0	0	2	1	0	0	69	15
Career total			252	54	14	2	12	4	1	0	282	60
