= Ritchie Humphreys =

English footballer (born 1977)

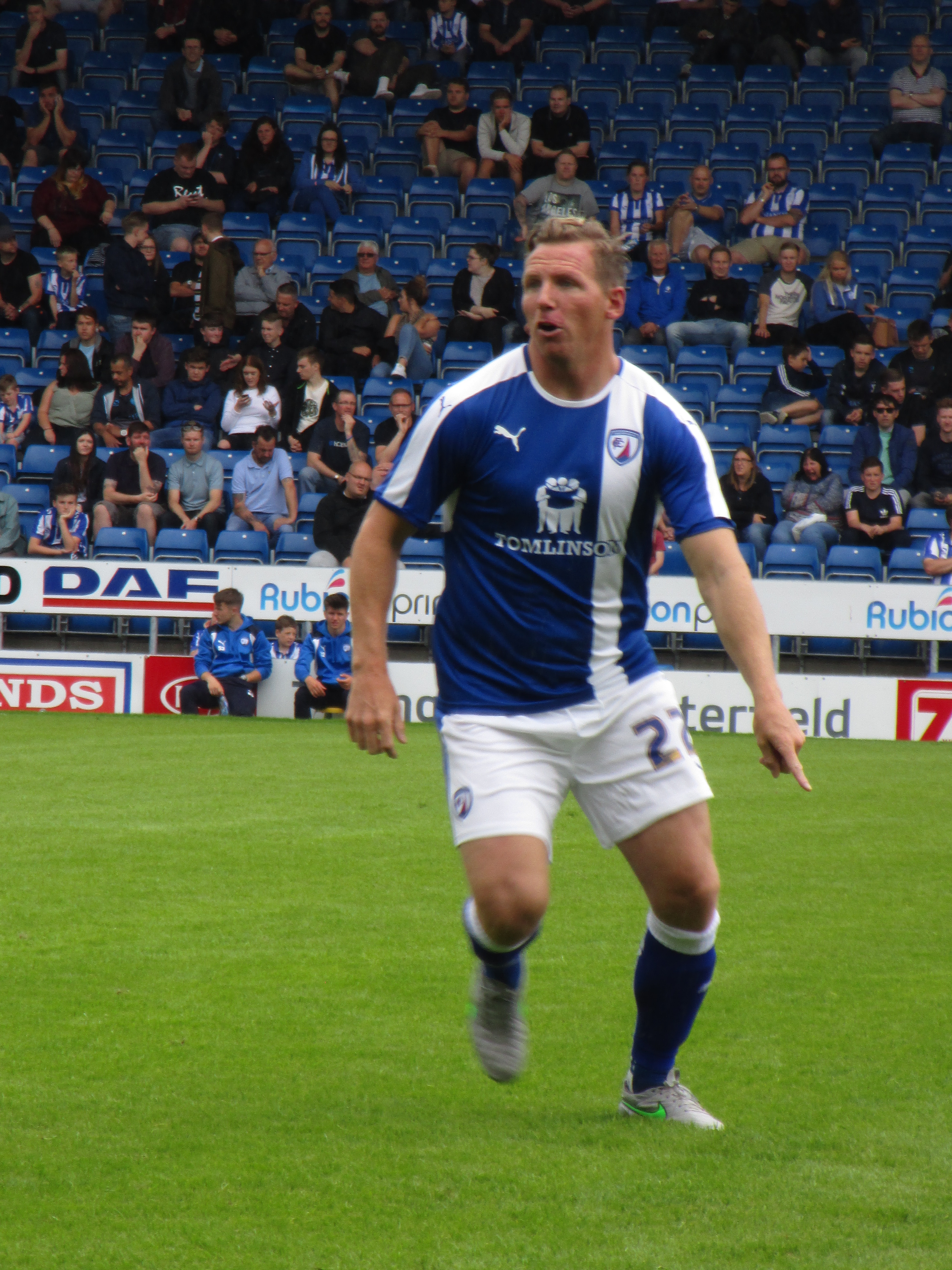
- Humphreys playing for Chesterfield in 2016

Personal information
- Full name: Ritchie John Humphreys
- Date of birth: 30 November 1977 (age 48)
- Place of birth: Sheffield, England
- Height: 5 ft 11 in (1.80 m)
- Position: Utility player

Youth career
- Sheffield United
- 1995–1996: Sheffield Wednesday

Senior career*
Years	Team	Apps	(Gls)
1996–2001	Sheffield Wednesday	67	(4)
1999	→ Scunthorpe United (loan)	6	(2)
1999–2000	→ Cardiff City (loan)	9	(2)
2001	Cambridge United	7	(3)
2001–2013	Hartlepool United	481	(34)
2006	→ Port Vale (loan)	7	(0)
2013–2017	Chesterfield	66	(2)
2017	Sheffield	4	(0)
Total		647	(47)

International career
1997	England U20	2	(0)
1997	England U21	3	(0)

Managerial career
- 2017: Chesterfield (caretaker)
- * Club domestic league appearances and goals

Ritchie John Humphreys (born 30 November 1977) is an English former professional footballer. He is a former chairman of the Professional Footballers' Association (PFA) and holds a UEFA A Licence coaching qualification.

Humphreys started his career with Premier League club Sheffield Wednesday in 1996. Whilst with the club, he was loaned out to Scunthorpe United and Cardiff City. He also won five caps for England at under-20 and under-21 levels. He left the club in 2001 and joined Cambridge United for a short period, after which he joined Hartlepool United. He joined Port Vale on loan in 2006. He left Hartlepool in July 2013 and moved on to Chesterfield. Whilst at Chesterfield in 2014, he appeared at Wembley Stadium in the final of the Football League Trophy and helped the club to the League Two title in 2013–14. He left Chesterfield in 2017 and went on to play for non-League side Sheffield until his retirement in December 2017.

In 12 seasons with Hartlepool, he made a club record of 544 appearances. He picked up numerous club awards, including three Player of the Year awards from fans, one from his teammates, and the award for Player of the Decade (2000s). He was also voted the club's Player of the Century. He was also recognised at regional and national levels, being named on the PFA Team of the Year twice and recognised as the North East League Player of the Year in 2006. He helped the club win promotion out of the fourth tier in 2002–03, and again in 2006–07. However, he suffered play-off heartbreak with the club on three occasions.

== Childhood and early career ==
Humphreys was born in Sheffield, South Yorkshire. He was introduced to football from an early age, his grandfather, Ernest Humphreys, played for Millwall, Motherwell and St Mirren. His dad, John Humphreys, also had trials with Sheffield United.

Humphreys grew up as a Sheffield United fan and joined their academy, which he described as a "dream come true". However, they released him when he was 13. He completed a boyhood dream by scoring at Bramall Lane in a 3–2 win for Hartlepool in December 2012.

Humphreys then played for the Sheffield Boys and was one of the few players who did not play for a professional club. However, that soon changed when Humphreys was scouted by a Sheffield Wednesday scout, and he joined their centre of excellence.

== Career ==
=== Sheffield Wednesday ===
In 1995, after leaving Newfield Secondary School, Humphreys became part of Sheffield Wednesday's youth squad. For the youth squad, Humphreys played as a left winger and was offered a professional contract. Due to the injuries of strikers David Hirst and Mark Bright, Wednesday manager David Pleat gave Humphreys the opportunity to go on Wednesday's pre-season tour of the Netherlands.

Humphreys played the first match and scored twice. He then scored again in the second match against FC Utrecht. Johan Cruyff was the guest of honour for that match, and he praised Humphreys and said he was the next Marco van Basten, something Humphreys later played down. During this pre-season tour, he was taken under the wing and guided by Wednesday legend Chris Waddle. After scoring 4 goals in his first 5 Premier League appearances, lifting Wednesday to the top of the league, David Pleat released his mentor Waddle. Humphreys did not score another league goal all season (only notching a hat-trick in a League Cup match against Grimsby Town in a 7–1 win). Humphreys' pre-season form earned him a full league debut in Wednesday's opening match against Aston Villa. In this match, Humphreys scored a goal that was recorded at 95.9 miles per hour (154.3 km/h), one of the hardest-hit goals in the history of football. Humphreys also scored in the following match against Leeds United. Two matches later, Humphreys scored a much talked about goal when he went on a 50 yards (46 m) run and scored a spectacular chipped goal against Leicester City . Humphreys was seen as the driving force behind Sheffield Wednesday's shock early lead at the top of The Premiership.

His form linked him to a £4 million transfer to Leeds United. However, Humphreys remained at Sheffield Wednesday and played 34 matches for them in the 1996–97 season. His performances earned him a place in the England team for the 1997 FIFA U-20 World Cup in Malaysia. Humphreys wore the much-coveted number 9 shirt for that tournament.

For the next two seasons, after Sheffield Wednesday signed an influx of foreign players such as Paolo Di Canio and Benito Carbone, Humphreys failed to hold down a regular place, and he only played a total of 31 matches, in those two seasons. Humphreys was sent on loan to Scunthorpe United on 13 August 1999, where he played six matches and again scored twice. He was then sent on loan to Cardiff City where he played 11 matches, scoring twice. After a brief return to the Wednesday team for the 2000–01 season, Humphreys decided to leave Wednesday to play more first-team football was allowed to join Cambridge United on trial. Humphreys impressed on trial, scoring 3 goals in 7 appearances, and it looked likely that Cambridge manager Roy McFarland was going to offer him a contract. However, Humphreys' trial was cut abruptly after he broke his foot. After the sacking of Roy McFarland, new Cambridge manager John Beck was reluctant to offer Humphreys a new contract until he had seen him play.

=== Hartlepool United ===
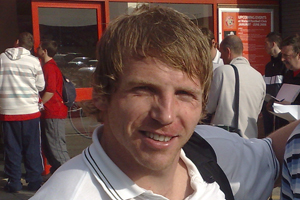
Humphreys in 2008

Hartlepool United manager Chris Turner, a former Wednesday goalkeeper, then offered Humphreys the chance to train with the club. Shortly after, Humphreys signed a new contract with the club, much to the dismay of Cambridge fans, who wanted him to stay and described him as "a big loss". Humphreys started the 2001–02 season partnering Kevin Henderson up front for the first 9 league matches. However, after a bad run, Humphreys was dropped and replaced by a new signing Gordon Watson. However, Humphreys would soon be back in the team and replace Henderson to partner Watson, these two players were already familiar with each other from their days at Sheffield Wednesday. Despite not scoring many goals manager Turner was pleased with his performances. Humphreys was then moved into central midfield due to the injury of Tommy Widdrington and after impressing played there for the remainder of the season. Humphreys' first season at the club would end in disappointment as he missed the decisive penalty in the play-off semi-final defeat to Cheltenham Town, which cost Hartlepool a place in the Second Division. The penalty struck the woodwork twice and stayed out. After his miss Humphreys was devastated. He was cheered up by Chris Turner and the players, who rang him and told him to keep his head up. Humphreys also received many letters of support from Hartlepool fans.

When Humphreys returned to pre-season training for the following season, he was playfully teased over his penalty miss. Humphreys took the motto "that anything that doesn't kill you, makes you stronger" and was determined to come back stronger. Humphreys started the 2002–03 season with a goal against Carlisle on the opening day of the season. Throughout the season, Humphreys would be played prominently as a left-winger. Humphreys finished the season as an ever-present in the Hartlepool squad, adding 11 goals to his name and helping Hartlepool gain promotion to the Second Division. His performances won him the Player of the Season award from the supporters. During this season it was revealed that Humphreys had been writing a diary, which he published and named it "From Tears to Cheers", in reference to his tears at Cheltenham.

The following two seasons again saw Humphreys as an ever-present in the Hartlepool team under new manager Neale Cooper. In the 2003–04 season, Hartlepool once again made the play-offs, only to go out after conceding two last minute goals to Bristol City, a memory which Humphreys described as more painful than Cheltenham. Due to the injuries of Michael Barron, Humphreys began regularly captaining the team.

In the 2004–05 season, Humphreys helped Hartlepool make the play-offs again. During the play-off semi-final against Tranmere, Humphreys had the task of taking a penalty for Hartlepool in sudden death. This was the first time Humphreys had taken a penalty since his crucial miss at Cheltenham. This time, he scored and sent Hartlepool through to the play-off final against his old club Sheffield Wednesday at the Millennium Stadium. This helped to erase the memories of Cheltenham. However, Hartlepool lost the play-off final to Sheffield Wednesday. Humphreys believes that of all the play-off defeats he has suffered the controversial loss to Wednesday was the hardest to take. Before the end of the season Humphreys extended his contract by a further two years.

The following season, 2005–06, saw Humphreys become the first player to make 200 consecutive league appearances for Hartlepool. For this season Humphreys' moved to left back due to Hugh Robertson being injured. Unfortunately, Hartlepool and Humphreys suffered relegation. Despite this Humphreys was named the Supporters and Players' Player of the Season as well as the North East Football Awards Football League Player of the Season.

For the 2006–07 season, Danny Wilson was appointed the new manager; Wilson had previously managed Humphreys at Sheffield Wednesday. On 22 August 2006, Humphreys was dropped for Hartlepool's match against Hereford United. After making 230 consecutive appearances, this was the first time Humphreys had not played since October 2001. Shortly after that match, Humphreys joined Port Vale on a month's loan. This was the third time that Danny Wilson had loaned Humphreys out during his career, the only times Humphreys had ever been loaned out. Port Vale tried to extend Humphreys' loan deal by at least another month, but Hartlepool refused and Humphreys returned. Humphreys later stated that he had no intentions of leaving Hartlepool.

After a bad start to the season, Hartlepool struggled near the table's lower reaches. However, this changed against Accrington Stanley when Humphreys scored a spectacular last-minute winner. This sent Hartlepool on a 23-match unbeaten streak. During that streak, Humphreys scored another spectacular goal against Walsall to give Hartlepool the lead in a victory that sent them into second place. Hartlepool would remain in the top two for the remainder of the season and secured promotion, narrowly missing out on the title. Humphreys' performances earned him a place in the League Two PFA Team of the Year. Humphreys was also awarded the Monkey Business Achievement Award for this contribution to the season, and later had a street in Hartlepool named after him. However, these awards proved small in comparison to when Humphreys was honoured by the Queen for making a "significant contribution to local and national life" earlier on in the season.

At the end of the 2007–08 season, Humphreys was voted Player of the Year, Player of the 2000s and Hartlepool United's Player of the Century. He continued to be a key player in 2008–09, making 54 appearances. He was a regular in the 2009–10 season, missing just nine matches as a central midfielder. On 26 February 2011, Humphreys replaced Joe Gamble after 82 minutes to make his 473rd appearance for Pools. This broke the record previously held by Watty Moore for over half a century. Over the course of the 2010–11 season he played 29 matches. On 2 August 2011, Humphreys was given a testimonial match against Premier League Sunderland to mark his ten years at Hartlepool United. Sunderland won 3–1, though the 5,757 fans present at the Victoria Park were full of appreciation for Humphreys. On 7 January 2012, Humphreys replaced Luke James 90 minutes into a 2–0 win over Rochdale to make his 500th appearance for Pools.> He signed a new contract in May 2012. He made 33 appearances in the 2012–13 campaign, as Hartlepool were relegated into League Two. Humphreys was named on the League One team of the week after scoring in a shock 3–2 win at Sheffield United on 29 December.

Hartlepool released Humphreys from the club in May 2013 after it was decided that the option to extend his contract would not be taken up.

=== Chesterfield ===
Humphreys signed a one-year contract with League Two club Chesterfield on 15 July 2013. He became a key player for Paul Cook's Spireites during the 2013–14 season, and on 30 March 2014 appeared at Wembley Stadium in Chesterfield's 3–1 defeat to Peterborough United in the final of the Football League Trophy, his first appearance at the national stadium. In total he made 49 appearances throughout the 2013–14 campaign as Chesterfield won promotion as divisional champions.

He made 25 appearances in the 2014–15 campaign, helping the Spireites to the play-offs, where they were beaten by Preston North End at the semi-final stage. He made only three appearances in the 2015–16 campaign, but in May 2016 signed a new contract to serve the club as a coach whilst also continuing his playing duties. On 8 January 2017, he was named caretaker manager of the club following the sacking of Danny Wilson. Gary Caldwell was appointed as manager nine days later. Humphreys was not offered a new playing contract at the end of the season, but Caldwell offered him a position on his coaching staff.

=== Sheffield and retirement ===
Humphreys rejected the opportunity to join the coaching staff at Chesterfield and instead signed with Northern Premier League Division One South club Sheffield. Humphreys retired from playing in December 2017, posting a thank you message on his Twitter account.

== PFA work ==
Humphreys succeeded Clarke Carlisle as chairman of the Professional Footballers' Association (PFA) in 2013. Humphreys was succeeded in the role by Ben Purkiss in November 2017. He now works for the PFA as a delegate liaison executive.

== Personal life ==
In July 2018, Humphreys completed his first full Ironman Triathlon, raising £3,000 for Sheffield Children's Hospital and Alzheimer's Society in the process.

== Career statistics ==
=== Playing statistics ===
Appearances and goals by club, season and competition
Club	Season	League			FA Cup		League Cup		Other		Total	
Club	Season	Division	Apps	Goals	Apps	Goals	Apps	Goals	Apps	Goals	Apps	Goals
Sheffield Wednesday	1995–96	Premier League	5	0	0	0	0	0	0	0	5	0
Sheffield Wednesday	1996–97	Premier League	29	3	4	2	2	0	—		35	5
Sheffield Wednesday	1997–98	Premier League	7	0	3	0	1	0	—		11	0
Sheffield Wednesday	1998–99	Premier League	19	1	2	2	0	0	—		21	3
Sheffield Wednesday	1999–00	Premier League	0	0	0	0	0	0	—		0	0
Sheffield Wednesday	2000–01	First Division	7	0	0	0	3	0	—		10	0
Sheffield Wednesday	Total		67	4	9	4	6	0	0	0	82	8
Scunthorpe United (loan)	1999–00	Second Division	6	2	0	0	0	0	0	0	6	2
Cardiff City (loan)	1999–00	Second Division	9	2	1	0	—		1 (Note: Appearance(s) in the Football League Trophy / EFL Trophy.)	0	11	2
Cambridge United	2000–01	Second Division	7	3	—		—		—		7	3
Hartlepool United	2001–02	Third Division	46	5	1	0	1	0	3 (Note: 1 appearance in the Football League Trophy and 2 appearances in the play-offs.)	0	51	5
Hartlepool United	2002–03	Third Division	46	11	2	0	1	0	0	0	49	11
Hartlepool United	2003–04	Second Division	46	3	3	1	2	0	3	0	54	4
Hartlepool United	2004–05	League One	46	3	6	0	2	0	6 (Note: 3 appearance in the Football League Trophy and 3 appearances in the play-offs.)	0	60	3
Hartlepool United	2005–06	League One	46	2	2	0	2	0	0	0	50	2
Hartlepool United	2006–07	League Two	38	3	3	0	0	0	2	1	43	4
Hartlepool United	2007–08	League One	45	3	2	0	1	0	2	0	50	3
Hartlepool United	2008–09	League One	45	0	5	0	3	0	1	0	54	0
Hartlepool United	2009–10	League One	38	0	1	0	0	0	1	0	40	0
Hartlepool United	2010–11	League One	25	2	3	1	0	0	1	0	29	3
Hartlepool United	2011–12	League One	29	1	1	0	0	0	1	0	31	1
Hartlepool United	2012–13	League One	31	1	1	0	0	0	1	0	33	1
Hartlepool United	Total		481	34	30	2	12	0	21	1	544	37
Port Vale (loan)	2006–07	League One	7	0	0	0	0	0	0	0	7	0
Chesterfield	2013–14	League Two	42	2	1	0	1	0	5	0	49	2
Chesterfield	2014–15	League One	19	0	5	0	1	1	0	0	25	1
Chesterfield	2015–16	League One	3	0	0	0	0	0	0	0	3	0
Chesterfield	2016–17	League One	2	0	0	0	0	0	2	0	4	0
Chesterfield	Total		66	2	6	0	2	1	7	0	81	3
Sheffield	2017–18	NPL Division One South	4	0	1	0	—		0	0	5	0
Career total			647	47	47	6	20	1	29	1	743	55

=== Managerial statistics ===
As of 17 January 2017

Managerial record by team and tenure
Team	From	To	Record					Ref.
Team	From	To	P	W	D	L	Win %	Ref.
Chesterfield (caretaker)	8 January 2017	17 January 2017	2	1	0	1	50.0	
Total			2	1	0	1	50.0	—

== Honours ==
Hartlepool United

- Football League Third Division/League Two second-place promotion: 2002–03, 2006–07

Chesterfield

- Football League Two: 2013–14
- Football League Trophy runner-up: 2013–14

Individual

- PFA Team of the Year: 2002–03 Third Division, 2006–07 League Two
- Hartlepool United Supporters' Player of the Year: 2002–03, 2005–06, 2007–08
- Hartlepool United Players' Player of the Year: 2005–06
- North East League Player of the Year: 2005–06
- Hartlepool United Player of the Decade: 2000s

== Bibliography ==
- From Tears to Cheers: Ritchie Humphreys' Hartlepool United Promotion Diary, Ritchie Humphreys, Cheers Promotions

Non-profit organization positions
Preceded by Clarke Carlisle	Chairman of the Professional Footballers' Association; 2013–2017	Succeeded by Ben Purkiss
