= Darren Craddock =

English footballer (born 1985)

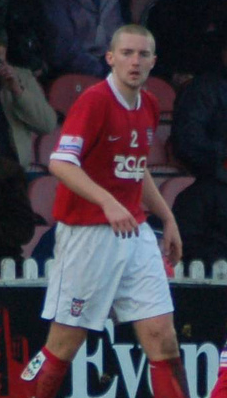
- Craddock playing for York City in 2007

Personal information
- Full name: Darren Craddock
- Date of birth: 23 February 1985 (age 41)
- Place of birth: Bishop Auckland, England
- Height: 6 ft 0 in (1.83 m)
- Position: Defender

Youth career
- 2001–2003: Hartlepool United

Senior career*
Years	Team	Apps	(Gls)
2003–2006	Hartlepool United	24	(0)
2004	→ Whitby Town (loan)	5	(0)
2006	→ York City (loan)	4	(0)
2006–2008	York City	65	(0)
2008–2009	Newcastle Blue Star	?	(?)
2009–2010	Blyth Spartans	19	(0)
2010–2011	Whitby Town	?	(?)
2011–2013	Newton Aycliffe	83	(2)
2014–2016	Shildon	?	(?)
2016–2017	West Auckland Town	?	(?)
- * Club domestic league appearances and goals as of 10:55, 11 November 2020 (UTC)

Darren Craddock (born 23 February 1985) is an English former footballer who played as a defender.

Craddock started his career with Hartlepool United in 2003. He joined York City on a one-month loan in 2006, who he joined permanently later that year, after making 24 league appearances for Hartlepool.

== Career ==
Born in Bishop Auckland, County Durham, Craddock joined the Hartlepool United youth system in 2001. Craddock played at Old Trafford in the FA Youth Cup third-round tie against Manchester United alongside Antony Sweeney and Matty Robson. Man United won 3-2 (AET) and featured future stars such as Darren Fletcher, Phil Bardsley and Kieran Richardson.

Craddock made his first team debut in a 4–0 victory over Whitby Town in the FA Cup first round on 8 November 2003. He joined Whitby Town on work experience in January 2004, where he made five appearances. He was handed his first professional contract by Hartlepool in June 2004, which was signed on 6 July.

In 2005, Craddock played at the Millennium Stadium in front of 79,000 fans in the 2005 Football League One play-off final for Hartlepool against Sheffield Wednesday.

He was signed by Conference National team York City on a one-month loan in January 2006. He was released by Hartlepool at the end of the 2005–06 season.

He signed for York permanently in May 2006, following his release by Hartlepool. He was warned he could face a spell on the sidelines by manager Billy McEwan after receiving a one-match ban after he was booked for fouling Forest Green Rovers striker Allan Russell after losing possession on the halfway line. He missed the rest of the 2006–07 season due to a fractured jaw, which was sustained against Cambridge United. He was offered a new contract by York at the end of the 2006–07 season. He was placed on standby for the England C team in February 2008 but two months later was released by York at the end of the 2007–08 season.

He joined Newcastle Blue Star of the Northern Premier League Division One North in June 2008. A year later, Craddock signed for Conference North side Blyth Spartans. He re-signed for former club Whitby in July 2010. Craddock signed for newly promoted Northern League Division One outfit Newton Aycliffe in July 2011, and scored on his debut for the team, a 6–1 victory over Stokesley Sports Club. Craddock made 83 appearances for the club.

Craddock signed for Shildon in May 2013 and won player of the year in his first season. He signed for West Auckland Town in May 2016.

In March 2026 Craddock was appointed Director of Youth Football at Shildon AFC.

== Career statistics ==
As of 17 December 2011.

Appearances and goals by club, season and competition
Club	Season	League			FA Cup		League Cup		Other^{[A]}		Total	
Club	Season	Division	Apps	Goals	Apps	Goals	Apps	Goals	Apps	Goals	Apps	Goals
Hartlepool United	2003–04	Second Division	10	0	1	0	0	0	0	0	11	0
Hartlepool United	2004–05	League One	10	0	0	0	1	0	4	0	15	0
Hartlepool United	2005–06	League One	4	0	2	0	0	0	1	0	7	0
Hartlepool United	Total		24	0	3	0	1	0	5	0	33	0
Whitby Town (loan)	2003–04	Northern Premier League Premier Division	5	0	0	0	0	0	0	0	5	0
York City (loan)	2005–06	Football Conference	4	0	0	0	0	0	0	0	4	0
York City	2006–07	Football Conference	35	0	2	0	0	0	1	0	38	0
York City	2007–08	Football Conference	30	0	2	0	0	0	5	0	37	0
York City	Total		69	0	4	0	0	0	6	0	79	0
Blyth Spartans	2009–10	Conference North	19	0	2	0	0	0	2	0	23	0
Newton Aycliffe	2011–12	Northern Football League Division One	24	2	1	0	0	0	2	0	27	2
Career total			141	2	10	0	1	0	15	0	167	2

== Footnotes ==
A. The "Other" column constitutes appearances and goals (including those as a substitute) in the Conference League Cup, Durham Challenge Cup, FA Trophy, Football League Trophy, play-offs and Northern League Cup.
