= Andrew Appleby =

English footballer

Andy Appleby
Personal information
- Full name: Andrew Appleby
- Date of birth: 11 October 1985 (age 41)
- Place of birth: Seaham, England
- Position: Forward

Senior career*
Years	Team	Apps	(Gls)
2004–2006	Hartlepool United	15	(2)
2006	→ Whitby Town (loan)	?	(?)
2006	→ Blyth Spartans (loan)	?	(?)
2006–2007	Gateshead	?	(?)
- Whitby Town
- Sunderland RCA
- Crook Town
- Darlington Railway Athletic
- Jarrow Roofing
- * Club domestic league appearances and goals

Andrew Appleby (born 11 October 1985) is an English former footballer who played as a striker in the English Football League for Hartlepool United.

== Playing career ==
Appleby came through the ranks of the Hartlepool academy and was a part of the youth team that won the MetroStars U-19s Dallas Cup in 2004.

Appleby made 18 appearances in all competitions for the League One side in the 2004–05 season when the team made the 2005 Football League One play-off final. Appleby scored twice for Hartlepool in games against AFC Bournemouth and MK Dons.

During his time with Hartlepool, Appleby spent time out on loan with Whitby Town and Blyth Spartans.

Following his release from Hartlepool in 2006, Appleby signed for Gateshead. He later played non-league football for Whitby Town, Sunderland RCA, Crook Town, Darlington Railway Athletic and Jarrow Roofing. He would score proficially for Roofing.
