= Jack Wilkinson (footballer, born 1985) =

English footballer

Personal information
- Full name: Jack Lloyd Wilkinson
- Date of birth: 12 September 1985 (age 41)
- Place of birth: Beverley, England
- Position: Striker

Senior career*
Years	Team	Apps	(Gls)
2003–2006	Hartlepool United	7	(2)
2003	→ Whitby Town (loan)	1	(0)
2003	→ Scarborough(loan)	?	(?)
2005	→ Bishop Auckland (loan)	?	(?)
2006-2009	Bridlington Town	?	(?)
- * Club domestic league appearances and goals as of 17:33, 22 June 2007 (UTC)

Jack Lloyd Wilkinson (born 12 September 1985) is an English footballer who played in the Football League for Hartlepool United.

Wilkinson managed to break into the reserve team at Hartlepool United and went out on loan to Scarborough, Whitby and Bishop Auckland in order to gain match practice. Jack who was the first of the two to break in the first team when he was rewarded by manager Neale Cooper for his performances. In 2003, Jack made his first team debut against his former loanee club Whitby in the FA Cup. Jack went on to make a total of 2 starts and 2 substitute appearances for the first team, scoring twice. Unfortunately in 2004, Jack picked up an injury and was out for three months. During this time Jack was over-taken in the pecking order for strikers and this led to him being released from the club in May, 2006.

After being released by Hartlepool, Wilkinson had a trial with York City.

Wilkinson signed for Bridlington Town following his release from 'Pool. He later quit the sport citing disillusionment with football.
