= Lee Peacock =

Scottish footballer (born 1976)

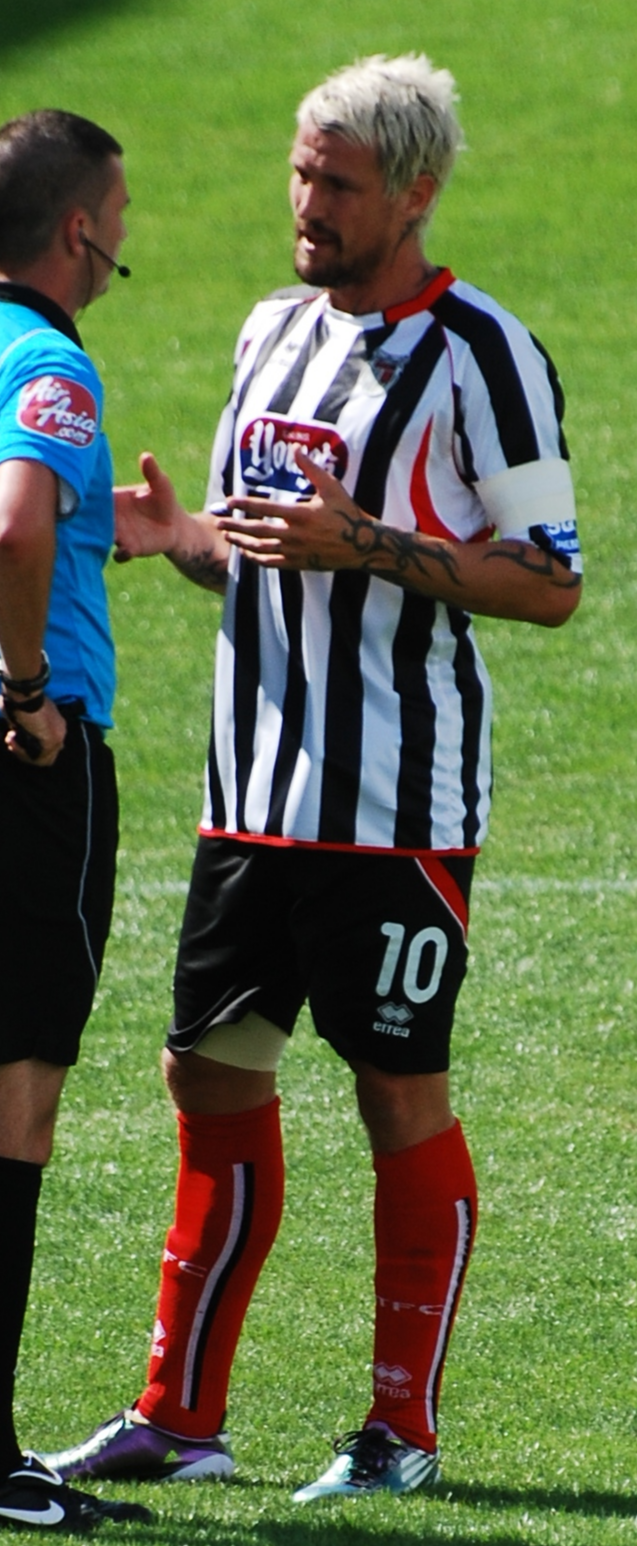
- Peacock playing for Grimsby Town in 2010

Personal information
- Full name: Lee Anthony Peacock
- Date of birth: 9 October 1976 (age 50)
- Place of birth: Paisley, Scotland
- Height: 6 ft 0 in (1.83 m)
- Positions: Striker; midfielder

Team information
- Current team: Plymouth Parkway (Coach)

Senior career*
Years	Team	Apps	(Gls)
1995–1997	Carlisle United	76	(11)
1997–1999	Mansfield Town	90	(29)
1999–2000	Manchester City	8	(0)
2000–2004	Bristol City	144	(54)
2004–2006	Sheffield Wednesday	51	(6)
2006–2010	Swindon Town	126	(20)
2010–2011	Grimsby Town	53	(5)
2011–2012	Havant & Waterlooville	21	(3)
2012–2013	Eastleigh	14	(2)
2014–2015	Eastleigh	5	(1)
2017	Portchester	6	(0)
Total		597	(131)

International career
1997	Scotland U21	1	(0)
- * Club domestic league appearances and goals as of 02:35, 26 April 2017 (UTC)

Lee Anthony Peacock (born 9 October 1976) is a Scottish former professional footballer and currently a coach at Plymouth Parkway F.C.

As a player, he was a forward and midfielder from 1995 to 2015. Having started his professional career with Carlisle United he joined Mansfield Town in 1997 before earning a move to Manchester City two years later. Having failed to establish himself as a first team regular at City he moved on to Bristol City in 2000 where he went on to rack up 144 league appearances in a four-year stay. In 2004, he signed for Sheffield Wednesday and later moved to Swindon Town. He played his final season in the Football League in 2009–10 season as he captained the Grimsby Town side that lost its fight in relegation to the Conference National. In 2011, he signed with part-timers Havant & Waterlooville before parting company later in the season where he moved on to Eastleigh and in 2017 briefly with Portchester. After a spell of coaching at Eastleigh, he moved to Swindon Town as head of youth coaching.

== Playing career ==
=== Carlisle United ===
Born in Paisley, Peacock progressed through the youth team setup at Carlisle United and made his debut during the 1994–95 season under Mick Wadsworth. During his first season at Brunton Park the club went on to win the Third Division title. United and Peacock also reached the final of the Football League Trophy but were defeated 1–0 in extra time by Birmingham City. During the 1995–96 season Carlisle suffered an instant relegation, before earning an immediate return in the 1996–97 season by finishing 3rd. United also reached the final of the Football League Trophy again this time winning at Wembley Stadium by beating Colchester United on a penalty shootout. On 3 May 1997, Peacock played his final game of the season for the club where he scored in a 2–0 victory over Exeter City. He made 76 league appearances for United, scoring 11 goals and would eventually be sold two games into the 1997–98 season, his final game for the club coming against Gillingham on 27 September 1997.

=== Mansfield Town ===
Nottinghamshire side Mansfield Town paid £75,000 for Peacock bringing him to Field Mill in September 1997. Steve Parkin handed Peacock his Stags debut on 18 October 1997 where he featured in a 1–0 defeat against Macclesfield Town. He became an instant first team regular for the club playing as a forward and on the left side of midfield. Peacock went on to make 90 appearances in the league over two seasons with the club, scoring 29 goals. Steve Parkin left the club at the end of the 1998–99 season and he was replaced by Bill Dearden. Dearden eventually sold Peacock in October 1999.

Lee also featured in the first ever game using a Fluo Flare fluorescent football against Barnet F.C. on 19 November 1998, winning 5–0. He also is the first player to get a hat-trick using the fluorescent ball, and in tradition in football he was the first player to take the ball home with him.

=== Manchester City ===
In October 1999, Peacock joined Manchester City for £500,000 who at the time were managed by Joe Royle. City had recently been promoted at the first attempt to the First Division following relegation in 1998. Peacock made his City debut on 6 November 1999 when he came on as a 45th-minute substitute for Shaun Wright-Phillips in the 1–1 draw with Queens Park Rangers. However Peacock would only make 10 appearances in all competitions during the 1999–2000 season and eventually he was transfer listed by Royle and departed only 10 months after signing for the Maine Road club. His final game was the return league game at home against Queens Park Rangers, City lost 3–1.

=== Bristol City ===
Peacock signed for Bristol City in August 2000 for a sum of £600,000. He became a first team regular in Danny Wilson's side and went on to become a regular in the City first team. He made his debut on 12 August 2000 in a 2–0 away victory over Wrexham. On 22 August he scored his first City goal in a 2–2 home draw with Brentford. Peacock went on to make over 150 appearances in all competitions netting just over 60 goals. In his final season at Ashton Gate the club secured a Play-Off place within the Second Division and after defeating Hartlepool United in the semi-final, City lost 1–0 at the Millennium Stadium against Brighton & Hove Albion. He also scored one of the goals as Bristol City beat Carlisle United 2–0 in the 2003 Football League Trophy Final.

=== Sheffield Wednesday ===
Peacock signed for League One side Sheffield Wednesday in the summer of 2004, on a free transfer. He became an integral part of the 2004–05 play-off winning side, gaining promotion to the Championship.

=== Swindon Town ===
Having settled his contract at Sheffield Wednesday in January 2006, Swindon Town manager Iffy Onuora persuaded Peacock to sign a two-and-a-half-year deal at Swindon in January 2006, after he had turned down a strong approach from Walsall as he wanted to move south for family reasons. Peacock made his debut as a goalscoring substitute – coming on with fifteen minutes to go in a home match with AFC Bournemouth on 21 January, he scored a last minute goal that wrapped the game up for the Town at 4–2. Despite only scoring one more goal during the rest of the campaign, his honest, hard-working attitude made him a firm favourite with the Town fans almost immediately. Despite a knee injury picked up at Colchester United in mid-March, he attempted to play through the pain barrier – until hobbling off just before half-time in a match against Swansea City on 11 April. By now, it was obvious that Peacock needed surgery, but he decided to take a role described by Onuora as "super sub" – making two further cameo appearances in the following two matches. When the Town's relegation to League Two was confirmed, Peacock was rested before going under the knife during the close season. Peacock went under the knife at the end of Swindon relegation season but returned successfully and was the Town's top goalscorer by October, before being switched to a midfield role. On 24 April 2007, Peacock was named the PFA's Fans' Player of the Year in League Two. On 31 January 2008, he signed a new one-and-a-half-year deal.

Peacock made his return to League football on 17 October 2009, in a match against Hartlepool United after eight months of treatment and recovery. He had previously made a substitute appearance in a Football League Trophy match against Exeter on 6 October 2009 as part of his recovery.

=== Grimsby Town ===
With first team chances becoming less and less due to Swindon Town doing well in League One, Peacock was free to search for a new club. Rumoured suitors were Stockport County and Carlisle United, but eventually he signed with Grimsby Town. On Friday 29 January 2010 both Swindon Town and Grimsby Town Football Club's announced that Peacock had joined League Two side Grimsby Town on a free transfer. Grimsby Town told fans via their official website that Peacock has signed a contract until the end of the 2010/11 season. Peacock stated that leaving Swindon Town was the hardest decision of his career however he had to move to get games. Six games into his stay at Blundell Park, Peacock was made captain of Grimsby.

The club suffered relegation from the Football League in May 2010, but despite this Peacock stayed with The Mariners and was selected as the club's official club captain for what would be his first season in non-League football, and Grimsby's first in over 100 years. Despite not being utilised as a regular throughout the season Peacock remained the Town skipper when he played but following the conclusion of the 2010–11 season, he was released.

=== Havant & Waterlooville ===
Peacock had previously moved his family to Hampshire in January 2011, and following prolonged contract talks he joined Conference South side Havant & Waterlooville in June 2011. His contract was cancelled by mutual consent in January 2012.

=== Eastleigh and Portchester ===
On 16 March 2012, Peacock signed for Conference South side Eastleigh for the remainder of the 2011–12 season. Peacock retired at the end of the season and remained with the club as their U16 team coach. In 2014, he came out of retirement to feature twice for the club

In January 2017 it was announced, that he had signed a contract with Graham Rix's Sydenhams Premier Division side Portchester.

== Coaching career ==
In June 2013 Peacock became the coach of the Eastleigh under-16 team moving to head of Youth and Development at Eastleigh. In September 2017 he was appointed "Head of Youth Coaching" at Swindon Town.

== Honours ==
Carlisle United

- Football League Trophy: 1996–97

Bristol City

- Football League Trophy: 2002–03

Sheffield Wednesday

- Football League One play-offs: 2005

Individual

- PFA Fans' Player of the Year: 2006–07 League Two
