= Patrick Collins (footballer) =

English footballer

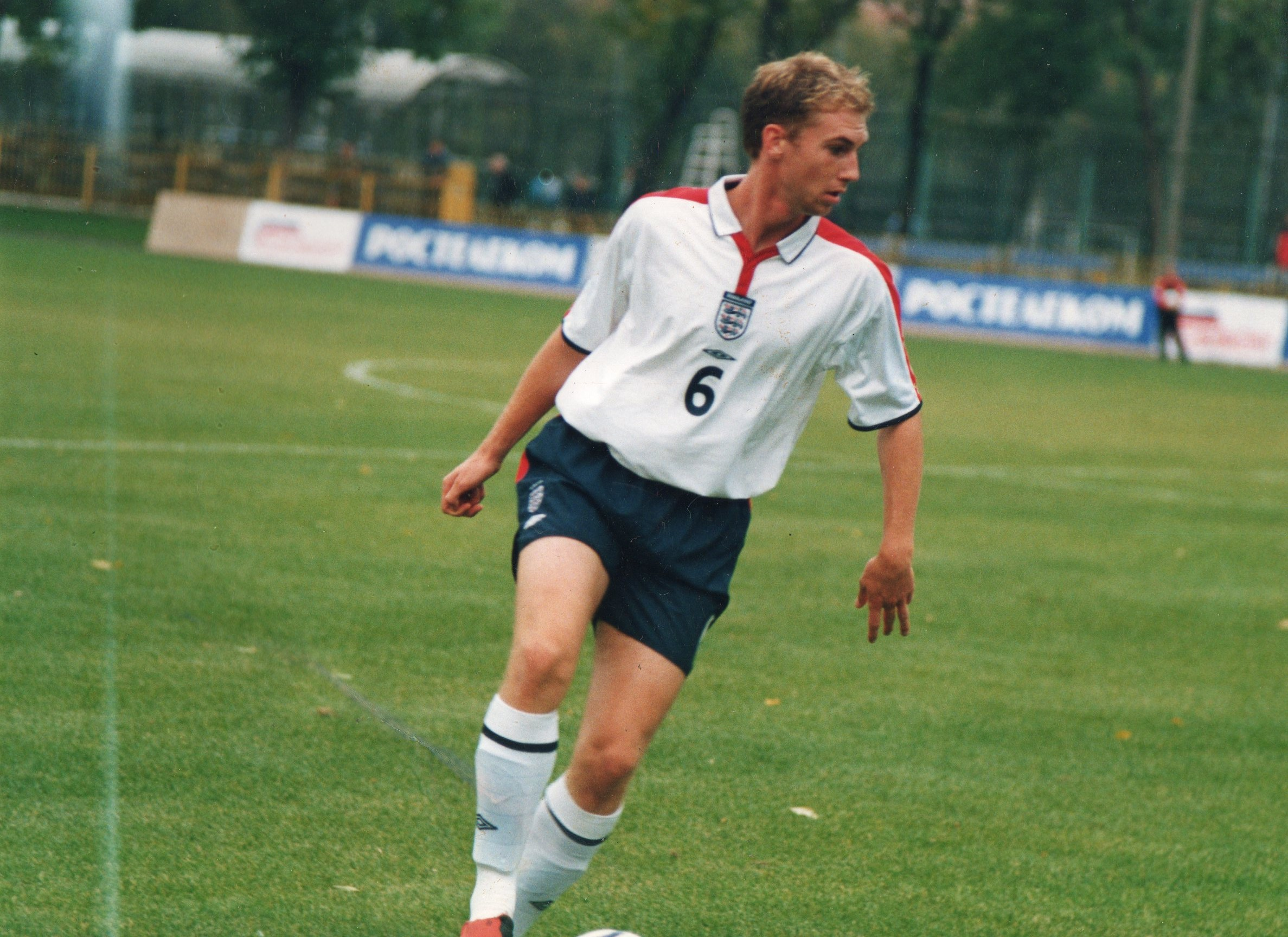

Personal information
- Full name: Patrick Paul Collins
- Date of birth: 4 February 1985 (age 41)
- Place of birth: Muscat, Oman
- Height: 6 ft 3 in (1.91 m)
- Position: Defender

Youth career
- 2000–2001: Longbenton Juniors
- 2002–2003: Sunderland FC

Senior career*
Years	Team	Apps	(Gls)
2003–2004	Sunderland	0	(0)
2004–2006	Sheffield Wednesday	36	(1)
2005	→ Swindon Town (loan)	13	(0)
2006–2008	Darlington	37	(1)
2007–2008	→ Oxford United (loan)	2	(0)
Total		88	(2)

International career
2002	England U17	10	(1)
2003	England U18	6	(0)
2004	England U19	3	(1)
2005	England U20	2	(0)
- * Club domestic league appearances and goals

Patrick Paul Collins (born 4 February 1985) is a professional footballer.

Six months of academy football and he earned his first of 20 England caps with the u'17's. His first game was against Portugal in which they drew 1–1, with Collins scoring England's goal.

Chances of first team football were restricted at Sunderland and although Collins (who was urgently called back from International duty with England in Egypt) was named in the first team squad for an FA cup match against Blackburn, he had to leave in order to play in a first team environment.

In 2004 Collins left Sunderland and after trials with Birmingham City and Celtic, signed for Sheffield Wednesday with the ambitions of playing in front of 25,000 people every week. In his first season Collins played 34 games and played in the playoff final at Cardiff in front of 70,000 people; coming on as a second-half substitute with the team 2–1 down to turn the game around and win 2–4. Collins went on to feature for Sheffield Wednesday following promotion to the championship but an influx of signings meant first team chances were restricted. After a loan spell at Swindon Town Collins decided to return to the North East and sign for Darlington FC in 2006.

Collins played 37 games in his first season at Darlington, captaining the side on several occasions, including a successful FA cup run ending at the hands of Premier League side Aston Villa. Unfortunately chronic calf cramps restricted him from staying fit and in his second season he went on loan to Oxford FC.

== Honours ==
Sheffield Wednesday

- Football League One play-offs: 2005

Individual

- PFA Scholar of the Year: 2004
