= Mark Tinkler =

English footballer (born 1974)

Personal information
- Full name: Mark Roland Tinkler
- Date of birth: 24 October 1974 (age 51)
- Place of birth: Bishop Auckland, England
- Height: 6 ft 2 in (1.88 m)
- Position: Midfielder

Team information
- Current team: Middlesbrough (assistant manager)

Youth career
- –1993: Leeds United

Senior career*
Years	Team	Apps	(Gls)
1993–1997	Leeds United	25	(0)
1997–1999	York City	94	(8)
1999–2000	Southend United	56	(1)
2000–2007	Hartlepool United	211	(34)
2007–2008	Livingston	19	(2)
2008	Whitby Town		
2008–2009	Shildon		
2009–2010	Esh Winning		
2010	Newton Aycliffe		

International career
1992–1993	England U18	7	(0)

Managerial career
- 2022-: Middlesbrough (assistant manager)
- * Club domestic league appearances and goals

Mark Roland Tinkler (born 24 October 1974) is an English football coach and former professional footballer, who is the assistant manager at EFL Championship side Middlesbrough.

As a player, he played as a midfielder, most notably in the Premier League for Leeds United. He also played in the Football League for York City, Southend United and Hartlepool United. He appeared in Scotland for Livingston before going on to feature in non-league for Whitby Town, Shildon, Esh Winning and Newton Aycliffe.

== Club career ==
Born in Bishop Auckland, Tinkler started his career in Leeds United's youth team. Tinkler was part of the youth team that made the FA Youth Cup Final and played against a Manchester United side that fielded a mass of future internationals including David Beckham, Gary Neville, Phil Neville, Paul Scholes and Nicky Butt. Leeds United won 4–1 on aggregate. In April 1993, Tinkler was promoted to the first team aged 18 and made his debut in the 2–1 defeat to Sheffield United. However, Tinkler suffered a serious ankle injury early on in the 1993–94 season in a reserves match against Manchester United. In his first four seasons at Leeds, Tinkler started just 19 first team matches and made 5 substitute appearances.

He left Leeds United in March 1997 and joined York City permanently for a fee of £85,000. Mark Tinkler went on to play a key role for York in the 1997/98 season and played in all but 2 of their 46 league matches, scoring 4 goals in the process. Tinkler made a similar impact for the following season and added another 36 league appearances to his tally.

In August 1999, Tinkler joined Southend United on a three-year deal for a fee of £40,000, with Southend managed by Alan Little, whom he played under at York City. He made 41 league appearances for Southend across the 1999–2000 season. Mark Tinkler started his second season at Southend strongly but it was unfortunately cut short after he fell off his ladder.

In November 2000, Tinkler signed for Third Division side Hartlepool United on a two-and-a-half-year deal. Tinkler's Hartlepool debut came against Scunthorpe United on 4 November 2000, in which they lost 3–0, and he immediately cemented his place in the first team and he formed a formidable partnership alongside Paul Stephenson and Tommy Miller. He managed to play a pivotal role in helping Hartlepool make the play-offs making 30 appearances, scoring 3 goals.

The 2001–02 season saw Tinkler score nine goals in forty league appearances as Hartlepool finished 7th, and qualified for the play-offs.

Tinkler was part of Hartlepool's promotion-winning team in the 2002–03 season, in which he scored 13 goals in 45 league appearances, and was named in the PFA Third Division Team of the Year. One of Tinkler's most notable performances came in the 4–3 win against Wrexham where he managed to score his first hattrick.

During the following seasons, Tinkler would once again play a vital part in Hartlepool's team as he helped establish them in League One. Unfortunately, injury has hampered Tinkler's career and he has struggled to play the number of games that he had previously. He was released by Hartlepool in May 2007 and joined Scottish First Division side Livingston in July 2007. He was released by Livingston when his contract expired in May 2008 and joined Whitby Town in the Northern Premier League Premier Division in June. He joined Shildon from Whitby Town in December 2008, before joining Esh Winning in November 2009. Following his spell at Esh Winning, he joined for Newton Aycliffe in 2010, and made his debut in a 3–0 win over Whitehaven.

== International career ==
He was part of the England under-18 squad for the 1993 UEFA European Under-18 Championship.

== Coaching career ==
Tinkler is employed as an Academy Coach at Middlesbrough.

He was appointed as first team assistant manager at Middlesbrough when Michael Carrick became manager in October 2022.

== Personal life ==
Tinkler is a fan of Sunderland. He has two daughters and a son.

== Honours ==
Hartlepool United

- Division Three runners-up: 2002–03
- Football League Two runners-up: 2006–07

Individual

- Division Three Team of the Year: 2002–03
