= 2004–05 Sheffield Wednesday F.C. season =

English football club season

Sheffield Wednesday
2004–05 season
- Manager: Chris Turner (until 19 September); Mark Smith (caretaker, until 23 Sept); Paul Sturrock (from 23 September)
- Football League One: 5th
- Play-offs: Winners
- FA Cup: First Round
- League Cup: Second Round
- League Trophy: First Round
- Top goalscorer: League: Steven MacLean (18); All: Steven MacLean (20)
- Average home league attendance: 23,107

The 2004–05 season saw Sheffield Wednesday compete in Football League One where they finished in 5th position with 72 points. They went on to beat Hartlepool United in the 2005 Football League One play-off final.

== Final league table ==
Pos	Team	Pld	W	D	L	GF	GA	GD	Pts	Promotion or relegation
3	Tranmere Rovers	46	22	13	11	73	55	+18	79	Qualification for League One play-offs
4	Brentford	46	22	9	15	57	60	−3	75	Qualification for League One play-offs
5	Sheffield Wednesday (O, P)	46	19	15	12	77	59	+18	72	Qualification for League One play-offs
6	Hartlepool United	46	21	8	17	76	66	+10	71	Qualification for League One play-offs
7	Bristol City	46	18	16	12	74	57	+17	70	

Updated to match(es) played on May 2005. Source: Soccerbase
Rules for classification: 1) points; 2) goal difference; 3) number of goals scored.
(O) Play-off winners; (P) Promoted

== Results ==
Sheffield Wednesday's score comes first

=== Legend ===
Win	Draw	Loss

=== Football League One ===
Match	Date	Opponent	Venue	Result	Attendance	Scorers
1	7 August 2004	Colchester United	H	0–3	24,138	
2	10 August 2004	Blackpool	A	2–1	6,713	Bullen, McMahon
3	14 August 2004	Torquay United	A	4–2	5,005	MacLean, Lee, Peacock, Heckingbottom
4	21 August 2004	Huddersfield Town	H	1–0	26,264	MacLean
5	27 August 2004	Tranmere Rovers	A	2–4	9,506	MacLean, Ndumbu-Nsungu
6	30 August 2004	Oldham Athletic	H	1–1	21,513	Brunt
7	4 September 2004	Luton Town	H	0–0	20,806	
8	11 September 2004	Walsall	A	1–1	6,403	Whelan
9	18 September 2004	Bournemouth	H	0–1	19,203	
10	25 September 2004	Wrexham	A	3–0	5,688	MacLean, Brunt, Proudlock
11	2 October 2004	Milton Keynes Dons	H	1–1	20,245	McGovern
12	17 October 2004	Barnsley	H	1–0	25,391	Proudlock
13	19 October 2004	Peterborough United	A	1–1	5,875	Bullen
14	23 October 2004	Bradford City	A	1–3	13,717	Bullen
15	23 October 2004	Swindon Town	A	2–3	6,972	Bullen, MacLean
16	30 October 2004	Chesterfield	H	2–2	24,271	Proudlock, MacLean
17	6 November 2004	Stockport County	A	3–0	7,222	Proudlock, McGovern, McMahon
18	20 November 2004	Hartlepool United	H	2–0	19,919	MacLean, Hamshaw
19	27 November 2004	Bristol City	A	4–1	14,852	Proudlock (2), Brunt, Collins
20	8 December 2004	Hull City	H	2–4	28,701	O'Brien, McGovern
21	11 December 2004	Brentford	H	1–2	21,592	MacLean
22	19 December 2004	Doncaster Rovers	A	4–0	10,131	MacLean (3), Jones
23	26 December 2004	Walsall	H	3–2	26,996	MacLean, Jones, Wright (o.g.)
24	28 December 2004	Port Vale	A	2–0	8,617	Jones, McGovern
25	1 January 2005	Luton Town	A	1–1	9,500	Jones
26	3 January 2005	Wrexham	H	4–0	24,253	Jones (2), MacLean, Heckingbottom
27	8 January 2005	Swindon Town	H	2–0	20,804	Jones, O'Brien
28	15 January 2005	Bournemouth	A	1–1	8,847	Heckingbottom
29	21 January 2005	Port Vale	H	1–0	18,465	MacLean
30	29 January 2005	Milton Keynes Dons	A	2–2	7,325	Quinn, Chorley (o.g.)
31	5 February 2005	Barnsley	A	0–0	19,659	
32	12 February 2005	Bradford City	H	1–2	23,232	MacLean
33	19 February 2005	Chesterfield	A	3–1	7,831	MacLean (2), Peacock
34	23 February 2005	Peterborough United	H	2–1	19,648	MacLean, Heckingbottom
35	26 February 2005	Brentford	A	3–3	8,323	Peacock (2), Bullen
36	6 March 2005	Doncaster Rovers	H	2–0	28,712	Bullen, Talbot
37	12 March 2005	Blackpool	H	3–2	21,539	Talbot (2), Rocastle
38	19 March 2005	Colchester United	A	1–1	4,169	McGovern
39	26 March 2005	Torquay United	H	2–2	21,526	Bullen, Barrett
40	29 March 2005	Huddersfield Town	A	0–1	17,292	
41	2 April 2005	Tranmere Rovers	H	1–2	22,925	Brunt
42	9 April 2005	Oldham Athletic	A	1–1	9,645	Whelan
43	15 April 2005	Hartlepool United	A	0–3	6,429	
44	23 April 2005	Stockport County	H	0–0	22,331	
45	30 April 2005	Hull City	A	2–1	24,277	Talbot, Quinn
46	7 May 2005	Bristol City	H	2–3	28,798	McGovern, Wood

=== Football League One play-offs ===
Match	Date	Opponent	Venue	Result	Attendance	Scorers
Semi final 1st leg	12 May 2005	Brentford	H	1–0	28,625	McGovern
Semi final 2nd leg	16 May 2005	Brentford	A	2–1	10,823	Peacock, Brunt
Final	29 May 2005	Hartlepool United	N	4–2	59,808	McGovern, MacLean, Whelan, Talbot

=== FA Cup ===
Match	Date	Opponent	Venue	Result	Attendance	Scorers
R1	13 November 2004	Swindon Town	A	1–4	6,160	Whelan

=== Football League Cup ===
Match	Date	Opponent	Venue	Result	Attendance	Scorers
R1	25 August 2004	Walsall	H	1–0	8,959	Peacock
R2	22 September 2004	Coventry City	A	0–1	8,362	

=== Football League Trophy ===
Match	Date	Opponent	Venue	Result	Attendance	Scorers
R1	29 September 2004	Chester City	H	1–2	7,640	MacLean

== Squad statistics ==
No.	Pos.	Name	League		FA Cup		League Cup		Other		Total	
No.	Pos.	Name	Apps	Goals	Apps	Goals	Apps	Goals	Apps	Goals	Apps	Goals
1	GK	(England) David Lucas	34	0	1	0	2	0	4	0	41	0
2	DF	(England) Lee Bullen	46	7	0	0	2	0	4	0	52	7
3	DF	(England) Paul Heckingbottom	37(1)	4	0	0	1	0	3	0	41(1)	4
4	DF	(England) Graeme Lee	19(3)	1	1	0	0	0	0	0	20(3)	1
5	MF	(England) Steve Adams	8(1)	0	0	0	0	0	0(1)	0	8(2)	0
5	DF	(England) Guy Branston	10(1)	0	1	0	1	0	0	0	12(1)	0
6	MF	(Republic of Ireland) Glenn Whelan	36	2	1	1	2	0	3	1	42	4
7	MF	(Scotland) Jon-Paul McGovern	46	6	1	0	2	0	4	2	53	8
8	MF	(England) Matthew Hamshaw	9(11)	1	0(1)	0	0	0	2	0	11(12)	1
9	FW	(Scotland) Steve MacLean	36	18	1	0	2	0	1(1)	2	40(1)	20
10	FW	(Scotland) Lee Peacock	18(11)	4	0	0	1	1	3	1	22(11)	6
11	MF	(Northern Ireland) Chris Brunt	27(15)	4	1	0	1(1)	0	2(2)	1	31(18)	5
12	MF	(Northern Ireland) Patrick Collins	25(3)	1	1	0	2	0	1(1)	0	29(4)	1
14	FW	(Denmark) Kim Olsen	0	0	0	0	0	0	0	0	0	0
14	DF	(Northern Ireland) Rory McArdle	0	0	0	0	0	0	0	0	0	0
15	GK	(Scotland) Paul Gallacher	8	0	0	0	0	0	0	0	8	0
15	FW	(Trinidad and Tobago) Kenwyne Jones	7	7	0	0	0	0	0	0	7	7
16	DF	(England) Richard Wood	33(1)	1	1	0	0	0	3	0	37(1)	1
17	DF	(Wales) Richard Evans	0	0	0	0	0	0	0	0	0	0
18	DF	(England) Alex Bruce	5(1)	0	0	0	0	0	3	0	8(1)	0
18	FW	(England) Jon Shaw	1(2)	0	0	0	0(1)	0	0	0	1(3)	0
18	DF	(Republic of Ireland) Joey O'Brien	14(1)	2	0	0	0	0	0	0	14(1)	2
19	DF	(England) Paul Smith	7(1)	0	0	0	1	0	1	0	9(1)	0
20	MF	(England) Lewis McMahon	13(2)	2	1	0	1(1)	0	1(1)	0	16(4)	2
21	GK	(England) Chris Adamson	1(1)	0	0	0	0	0	0	0	1(1)	0
21	GK	(Sweden) Ola Tidman	3(1)	0	0	0	0	0	0	0	3(1)	0
22	FW	(Northern Ireland) James Quinn	10(5)	2	0	0	0	0	3	0	13(5)	2
23	MF	(Grenada) Craig Rocastle	9(2)	1	0	0	0	0	3	0	12(2)	1
24	DF	(Spain) Zigor Aranalde	1(1)	0	0	0	0	0	0	0	1(1)	0
24	FW	(Democratic Republic of the Congo) Guylain Ndumbu-Nsungu	4(7)	1	0	0	0(1)	0	0	0	4(8)	0
24	DF	(England) Adam Green	3	0	0	0	0	0	0	0	3	0
25	FW	(England) Drew Talbot	3(18)	4	1	0	0	0	0(3)	1	4(21)	5
25	DF	(England) Hasney Aljofree	2	0	0	0	0	0	1	0	3	0
26	FW	(England) Danny Reet	0	0	0	0	0	0	0	0	0	0
26	MF	(England) Chris Marsden	15	0	0	0	2	0	1	0	18	0
27	FW	(Republic of Ireland) Graham Barrett	5(1)	1	0	0	0	0	0	0	5(1)	1
28	MF	(England) Ross Greenwood	0(2)	0	0	0	1	0	0(1)	0	1(3)	0
30	MF	(England) Liam Needham	0	0	0	0	0	0	0(1)	0	0(1)	0
31	FW	(England) Adam Proudlock	11(3)	6	0	0	1(1)	0	3	1	15(4)	7
34	DF	(England) Luke Foster	0	0	0	0	0	0	0	0	0	0
39	DF	(England) Tommy Spurr	0	0	0	0	0	0	0	0	0	0
39	DF	(England) Craig Armstrong	0	0	0	0	0	0	0	0	0	0
