= 2003–04 Sheffield Wednesday F.C. season =

English football club season

Sheffield Wednesday
2003–04 season
- Manager: Chris Turner
- Stadium: Hillsborough
- Second Division: 16th
- FA Cup: Second round
- League Cup: First round
- Top goalscorer: League: Ndumbu-Nsungu (9); All: Ndumbu-Nsungu (10)
- Average home league attendance: 22,336

During the 2003–04 English football season, Sheffield Wednesday competed in the Football League Second Division.

== Season summary ==
After relegation the previous season, Sheffield Wednesday competed in the third tier of English football for the first time in over 20 years. Wednesday made a positive start to the season and was 2nd in the league by mid-September. As results slipped through Autumn they slid down to mid table, although they remained around 6 points from the play off places going into the new year. An upturn in form never materialised and as the season wore on and promotion became less likely, results turned for the worse. Wednesday lost 9 of their last 13 league games finishing 16th, 20 points from a play off position and only avoiding relegation by 3 points.

== Final league table ==
Pos	Team	Pld	W	D	L	GF	GA	GD	Pts
14	Blackpool	46	16	11	19	58	65	−7	59
15	Oldham Athletic	46	12	21	13	66	60	+6	57
16	Sheffield Wednesday	46	13	14	19	48	64	−16	53
17	Brentford	46	14	11	21	52	69	−17	53
18	Peterborough United	46	12	16	18	58	58	0	52

Rules for classification: In the Football League goals scored (GF) takes precedence over goal difference (GD).

== Results ==
Sheffield Wednesday's score comes first

=== Legend ===
Win	Draw	Loss

=== Football League First Division ===
Date	Opponent	Venue	Result	Attendance	Scorers
9 August 2003	Swindon	A	3–2		Owusu (2), Kuqi
16 August 2003	Oldham	H	2–2		Kuqi (2)
23 August 2003	Peterborough	A	1–0		Kuqi
25 August 2003	Wrexham	H	2–3		Quinn, Smith
1 September 2003	Wycombe	A	2–1		Owusu, Quinn
6 September 2003	Tranmere	H	2–0		Smith, Cooke
13 September 2003	Stockport	H	2–2		Kuqi, Quinn
16 September 2003	Bournemouth	A	0–1		
20 September 2003	Brighton	A	0–2		
27 September 2003	Grimsby	H	0–0		
1 October 2003	Notts County	H	2–1		McLaren (2)
4 October 2003	Brentford	A	3–0		Holt (2), Owusu
10 October 2003	Hartlepool	A	1–1		Owusu
18 October 2003	Rushden	H	0–0		
22 October 2003	Plymouth	H	1–3		Reddy
25 October 2003	Bristol City	A	1–1		Proudlock
1 November 2003	Blackpool	H	0–1		
15 November 2003	Colchester	A	1–3		Bromby
22 November 2003	Luton	H	0–0		
29 November 2003	Q.P.R.	A	0–3		
13 December 2003	Barnsley	A	1–1		Ndumbu-Nsungu
20 December 2003	Chesterfield	H	0–0		
26 December 2003	Port Vale	H	2–3		Robins, Lee
28 December 2003	Tranmere	A	2–2		Lee, Ndumbu-Nsungu
3 January 2004	Wrexham	A	2–1		Ndumbu-Nsungu, Quinn
10 January 2004	Swindon	H	1–1		Robins
17 January 2004	Oldham	A	0–1		
24 January 2004	Peterborough	H	2–0		Robins, Proudlock
30 January 2004	Wycombe	H	1–1		Proudlock
7 February 2004	Port Vale	A	0–3		
14 February 2004	Hartlepool	H	1–0		Ndumbu-Nsungu
21 February 2004	Rushden	A	2–1		Ndumbu-Nsungu (2)
28 February 2004	Bristol City	H	1–0		Lee
2 March 2004	Plymouth	A	0–2		
7 March 2004	Chesterfield	A	1–3		Ndumbu-Nsungu
13 March 2004	Barnsley	H	2–1		Ndumbu-Nsungu (2)
17 March 2004	Bournemouth	H	0–2		
20 March 2004	Stockport	A	0–1		
27 March 2004	Brighton	H	2–1		Brunt, Mustoe
3 April 2004	Grimsby	A	0–2		
10 April 2004	Brentford	H	1–1		Smith
12 April 2004	Notts County	A	0–0		
17 April 2004	Blackpool	A	1–4		Brunt
24 April 2004	Colchester	A	0–1		
1 May 2004	Luton	A	2–3		Shaw, Cooke
8 May 2004	Q.P.R.	H	1–3		Shaw

=== FA Cup ===
Round	Date	Opponent	Venue	Result	Attendance	Goalscorers
R1	9 November 2003	Salisbury	H	4–0		Proudlock (3), Owusu
R2	6 December 2003	Scunthorpe	A	2–2		Ndumbu-Nsungu, Holt
R2R	17 December 2003	Scunthorpe	H	0–0 (Lost 3–1 on Penalties)		

=== League Cup ===
Round	Date	Opponent	Venue	Result	Attendance	Goalscorers
R1	13 August 2003	Hartlepool	H	2–2 (Lost 5–4 on Penalties)		Wood, Lee

=== Football League Trophy ===
Round	Date	Opponent	Venue	Result	Attendance	Goalscorers
North R1	15 October 2003	Grimsby	H	1–1 (Won 5–4 on Penalties)	7,323	Proudlock
North R2	12 November 2003	Barnsley	H	1–0	13,575	Reddy
North QF	9 December 2003	Carlisle	A	3–0	2,869	Robins (2), Lee
North SF	20 January 2004	Scunthorpe	H	4–0	10,236	Robins (2), Proudlock (2)
North Final Leg 1	10 February 2004	Blackpool	A	0–1	7,842	
North Final Leg 2	25 February 2004	Blackpool	H	0–2	21,390	

== Players ==
=== First-team squad ===
Squad at end of season

Note: Flags indicate national team as defined under FIFA eligibility rules; some limited exceptions apply. Players may hold more than one non-FIFA nationality.

No.	Pos.	Nation	Player
1	GK	(England) ENG	Kevin Pressman
2	DF	(Republic of Ireland) IRL	Derek Geary
3	MF	(Republic of Ireland) IRL	Brian Barry-Murphy
4	DF	(England) ENG	Graeme Lee
5	DF	(England) ENG	Dean Smith
6	DF	(England) ENG	Leigh Bromby
7	MF	(Republic of Ireland) IRL	Alan Quinn
8	MF	(England) ENG	Paul McLaren
9	FW	(Denmark) DEN	Kim Olsen
11	MF	(England) ENG	Paul Smith
12	DF	(England) ENG	Steve Haslam
13	GK	(England) ENG	Chris Stringer
14	MF	(England) ENG	Matt Hamshaw
15	MF	(England) ENG	Adam Chambers (on loan from West Bromwich Albion)
16	DF	(England) ENG	Craig Armstrong
17	MF	(Wales) WAL	Richard Evans
18	FW	(England) ENG	Jon Shaw

No.	Pos.	Nation	Player
19	DF	(England) ENG	Richard Wood
20	DF	(England) ENG	Jon Beswetherick
21	GK	(Sweden) SWE	Ola Tidman
22	MF	(England) ENG	Robbie Mustoe
23	MF	(England) ENG	Terry Cooke
24	FW	(Democratic Republic of the Congo) COD	Guylain Ndumbu-Nsungu
25	GK	(England) ENG	Adam Ogden
26	GK	(England) ENG	Eric Nixon
28	DF	(England) ENG	Chris Carr
29	MF	(England) ENG	Laurie Wilson
30	MF	(England) ENG	Liam Needham
31	FW	(England) ENG	Adam Proudlock
32	GK	(England) ENG	Robert Poulter
33	MF	(England) ENG	Lewis McMahon
34	FW	(England) ENG	Mark Robins
35	MF	(Northern Ireland) NIR	Chris Brunt

=== Left club during season ===
Note: Flags indicate national team as defined under FIFA eligibility rules; some limited exceptions apply. Players may hold more than one non-FIFA nationality.

No.	Pos.	Nation	Player
9	FW	(England) ENG	Grant Holt (to Rochdale)
10	FW	(England) ENG	Lloyd Owusu (to Reading)
15	FW	(Finland) FIN	Shefki Kuqi (to Ipswich Town)
27	GK	(England) ENG	David Lucas (on loan from Preston North End)

No.	Pos.	Nation	Player
28	FW	(Republic of Ireland) IRL	Michael Reddy (on loan from Sunderland)
30	FW	(France) FRA	Mickaël Antoine-Curier (to Notts County)
30	MF	(England) ENG	Mark Wilson (on loan from Middlesbrough)
35	FW	(Scotland) SCO	Mark Burchill (on loan from Portsmouth)
