= Clayton Donaldson =

Footballer (born 1984)

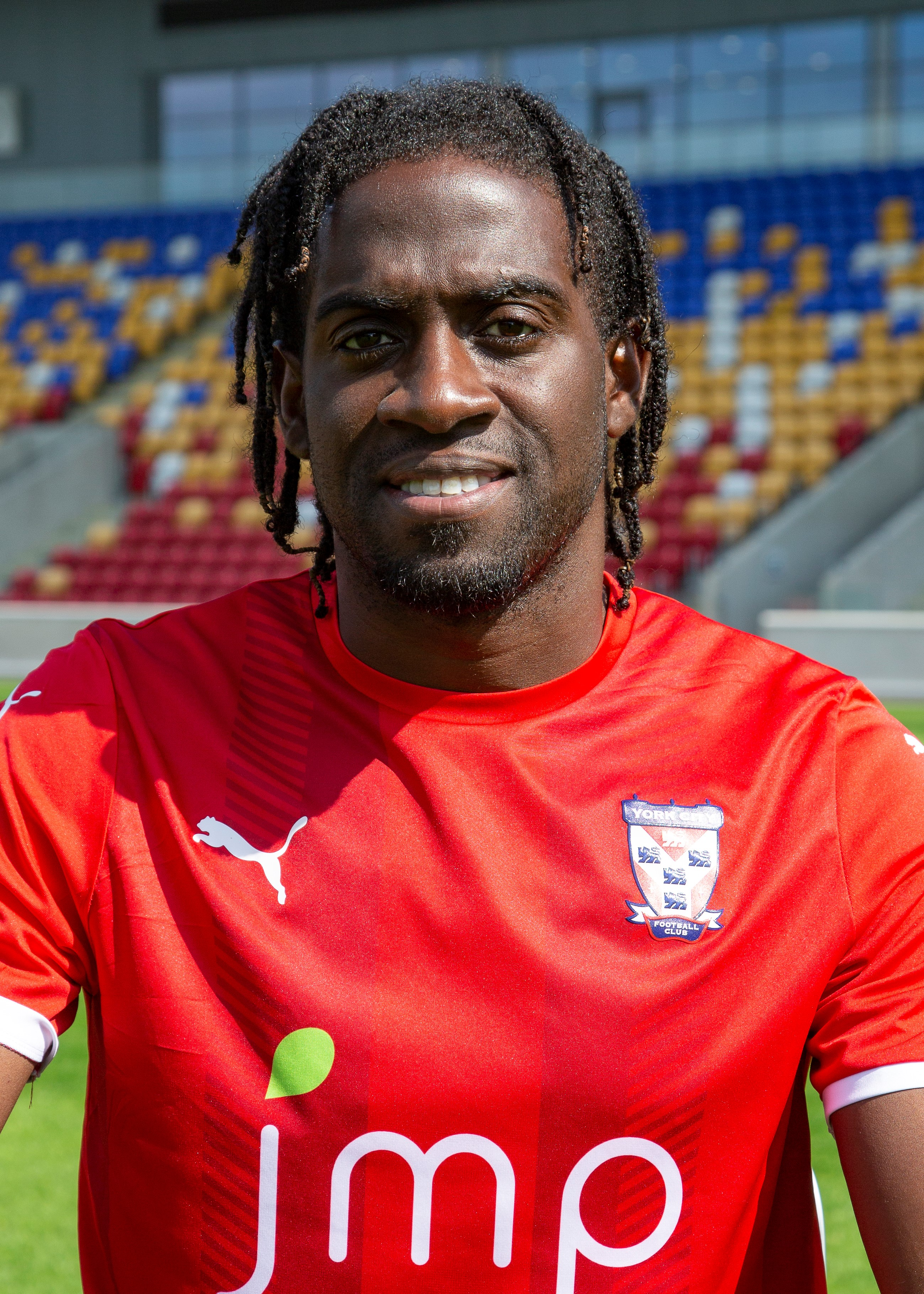
- Donaldson with York City in 2021

Personal information
- Full name: Clayton Andrew Donaldson
- Date of birth: 7 February 1984 (age 42)
- Place of birth: Bradford, England
- Height: 6 ft 1 in (1.85 m)
- Position: Striker

Team information
- Current team: York City (head of development)

Youth career
- –2000: Bradford City
- 2000–2002: Hull City

Senior career*
Years	Team	Apps	(Gls)
2002–2005	Hull City	2	(0)
2002–2003	→ Harrogate Town (loan)	6	(2)
2003	→ Scarborough (loan)	2	(0)
2004	→ Halifax Town (loan)	4	(0)
2004	→ Harrogate Town (loan)	8	(3)
2005–2007	York City	85	(41)
2007–2008	Hibernian	18	(5)
2008–2011	Crewe Alexandra	117	(47)
2011–2014	Brentford	136	(46)
2014–2017	Birmingham City	113	(32)
2017–2018	Sheffield United	26	(5)
2018–2019	Bolton Wanderers	31	(1)
2019–2021	Bradford City	55	(8)
2021–2022	York City	33	(8)
2022–2023	Gainsborough Trinity	42	(22)
2023–2024	Farsley Celtic	42	(3)
Total		720	(223)

International career
2006–2007	England National Game XI	2	(0)
2015–2016	Jamaica	10	(2)

Managerial career
- 2023–2024: Farsley Celtic
- * Club domestic league appearances and goals

Clayton Andrew Donaldson (born 7 February 1984) is a former professional footballer and manager who played as a striker. He is Head of Development at York City.

He has played in the English Football League and Scottish Premier League for Hull City, Hibernian, Crewe Alexandra, Brentford, Birmingham City, Sheffield United, Bolton Wanderers and Bradford City, and at senior international level for the Jamaica national team.

Donaldson started his career with Hull City in 2002, scoring on his first-team debut in the Football League Trophy later that year. He was sent out on loan to non-League clubs on four occasions, and with chances in the first team at Hull limited, he was released in 2005 and subsequently joined York City. In his first season at the club, he was voted as their Clubman of the Year and his second season saw him finish as the team's highest scorer and third highest scorer in the league.

He joined Scottish Premier League club Hibernian in July 2007, after signing a pre-contract agreement with them in January whilst with York. After a season at the club he left to return to England with Crewe Alexandra. After three years with Crewe, being the top goalscorer in League Two in his last season, he joined Brentford in 2011. He spent three years with the club, helping them gain promotion into the Championship in 2013–14, before signing for Birmingham City at the end of that season when his contract expired. After three seasons with Birmingham, he signed for another Championship club, Sheffield United, in August 2017. Spending just a year with the club, he moved to Bolton Wanderers in June 2018. He has since played in the lower league divisions of English football, with the likes of York, Gainsborough Trinity, and most recently, Farsley Celtic

Donaldson played internationally for the England National Game XI, who represent England at non-League level, with whom he earned two caps, before accepting an invitation to represent Jamaica in 2015.

== Early life ==
Born in Bradford, West Yorkshire, Donaldson grew up in Manningham and attended Manningham Middle School and Rhodesway School. He played football for his school team before joining his hometown club Bradford City, who he supported as a child. Donaldson was released by the club aged 16, with only one player, Lewis Emanuel, being retained from his age group. He was soon signed by Hull City, having been spotted by their youth-team coach Billy Russell.

== Club career ==
=== Hull City and loan spells ===
Donaldson was a trainee with Hull's youth system when scoring from close range on his first-team debut in Hull's Football League Trophy 3–1 away defeat to Port Vale on 22 October 2002, having replaced Gary Alexander as a 60th-minute substitute. He was sent out on loan to Northern Premier League Premier Division club Harrogate Town in November 2002, and scored in the 68th minute of his debut, a 3–1 away win over Gateshead on 12 November. He stayed with Harrogate for three months, in that time scoring 5 goals in 10 appearances before returning to Hull. He made his Football League debut for Hull on 8 February 2003, coming on as an 81st-minute substitute for Damien Delaney in a 1–0 defeat at home to Lincoln City. Two days later, he signed a two-year professional contract with Hull. He made one further appearance in the 2002–03 season, as a 69th-minute substitute in a 1–0 away win against Boston United.

In August 2003, Donaldson joined Football Conference club Scarborough on a one-month loan. His debut came in a 2–1 home defeat to Burton Albion on 23 August 2003, and made only one more appearance before his loan expired. On his return to Hull he made two further appearances, both as a substitute in the Football League Trophy, before joining Football Conference club Halifax Town in February 2004 on a one-month loan. Having made his debut as a 58th-minute substitute for Jake Sagare in a 2–0 away defeat to Margate on 8 February 2004, Donaldson finished his spell at Halifax with four appearances. With little prospect of a first-team place at Hull, he rejoined Harrogate in September 2004 on a one-month loan, and scored in the 18th minute of his second debut for the club, a 3–0 home win over Lancaster City on 18 September. He was voted the Conference North Player of the Month for October 2004, having scored three goals from five appearances in that period. His second loan spell with Harrogate ended having scored 4 goals from 11 appearances. At the end of 2004–05, Donaldson was released by Hull, as manager Peter Taylor was unable to guarantee him first-team football.

=== York City ===
After his release by Hull, Donaldson was spoken to by Barrow, but was signed by Conference National club York City on 23 June 2005, with manager Billy McEwan saying: "He's a young player who is very hungry for his chance and he'll bring competition up front". He made his debut in a 0–0 home draw with Crawley Town on 13 August 2005. His first goal came in a 1–0 win against Cambridge United on 2 September 2005. Picking the ball up on the half-way line, he ran past two opposition defenders on the left wing before shooting the ball into the bottom-right corner from outside the penalty area. During 2005–06, Donaldson scored 18 goals for York and was awarded the Clubman of the Year award, voted for by the club's supporters, before the final match of the season against Hereford United on 29 April 2006. He agreed a contract extension with York for 2006–07 in July 2006.

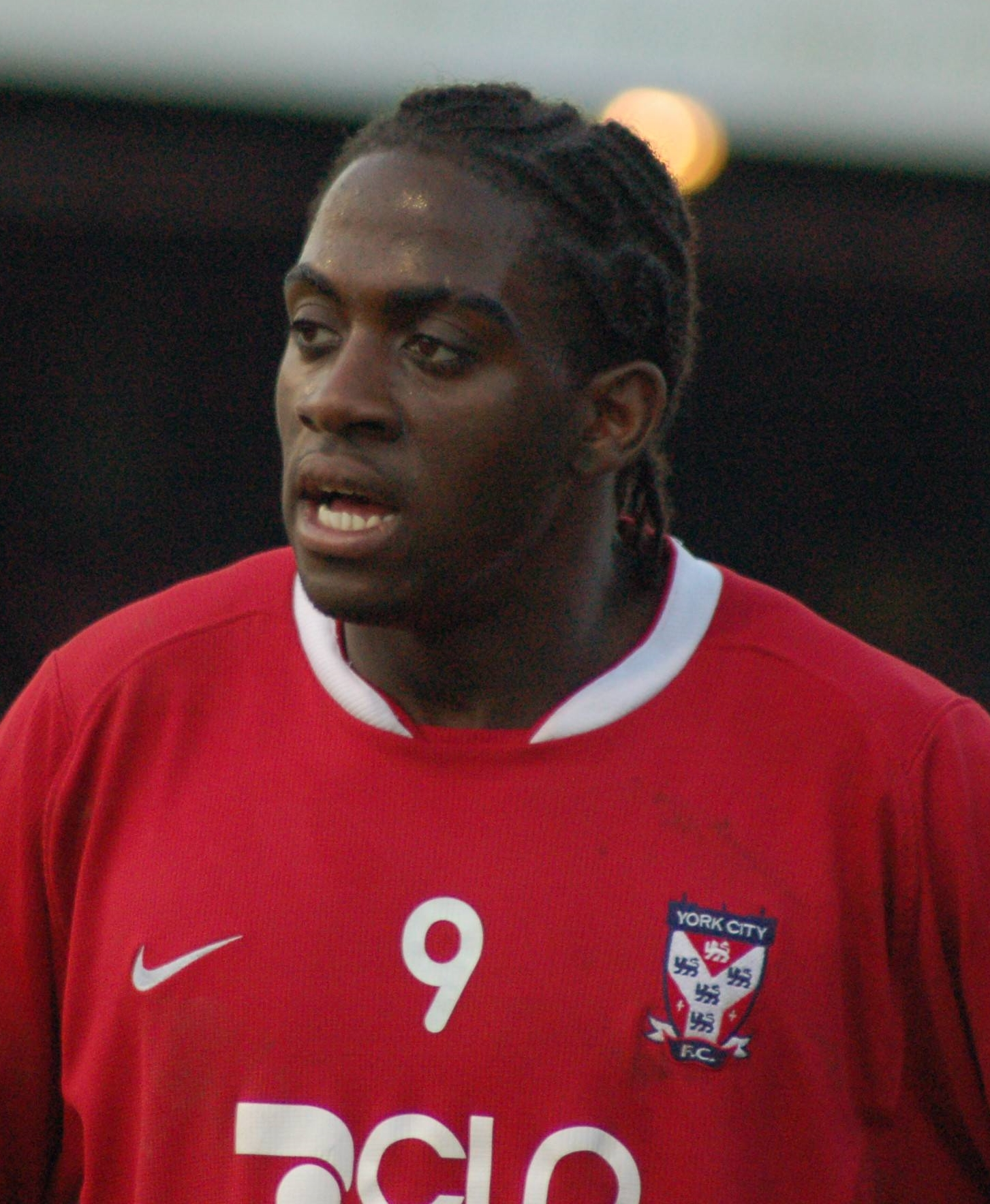
Donaldson playing for York City in 2007

York manager McEwan compared Donaldson to Paulo Wanchope in September 2006, but following York's 2–0 away defeat against Oxford United later that month, McEwan criticised Donaldson's selfishness in attack, saying it cost them the match. In late 2006, Donaldson became subject of much transfer speculation. Wolverhampton Wanderers manager Mick McCarthy watched him in York's 1–0 home victory over Altrincham, in which he scored his 12th goal of the season, on 5 November 2006. He was also watched by Scottish Premier League club Hibernian. In response to this speculation, Donaldson said: "I don't read too much into the speculation. I've heard it before and nothing has happened so I will just keep my head down and enjoy my football until a point comes when the manager or board come and tell me they have had an offer they want to consider".

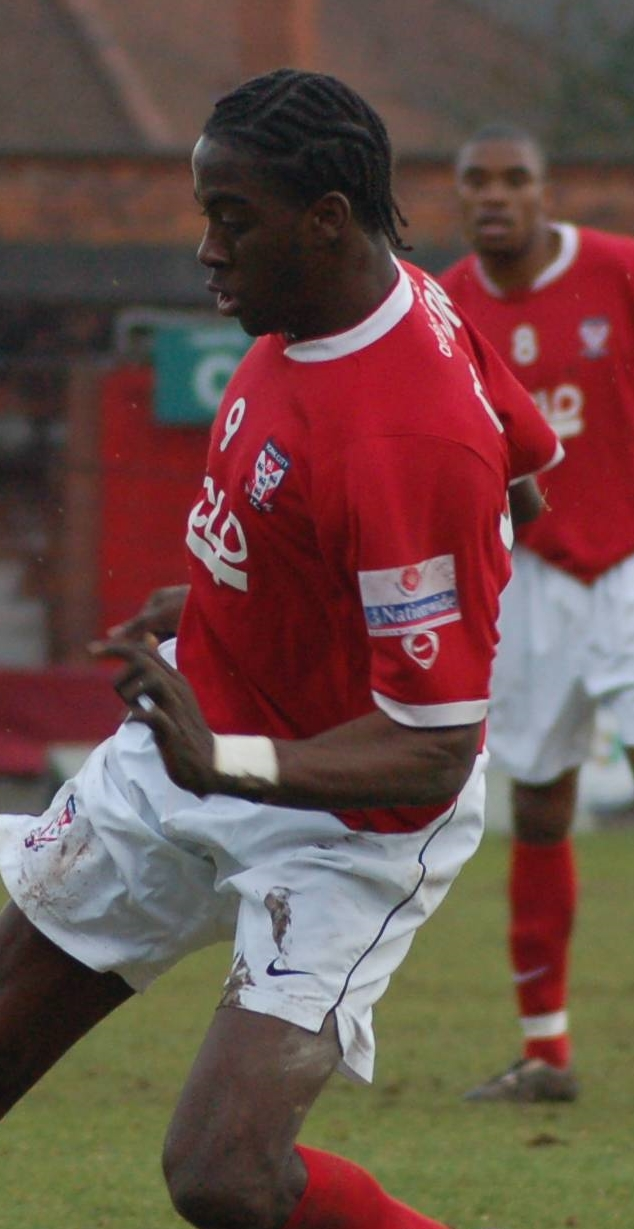
Donaldson playing for York City in 2007

On 18 December 2006, he rejected the offer of a new contract at York, meaning he would be out of contact at the end of the season. Scunthorpe United and Peterborough United director of football Barry Fry both watched him in December 2006. Fry tabled a £100,000 bid for Donaldson, but this failed to meet York's valuation and they halted their bid at this amount. He was reportedly given a £500,000 transfer valuation by York in January 2007. A cash-plus-player offer from League Two club Accrington Stanley for Donaldson was rejected in January 2007, which according to York was £25,000 and was termed as an "embarrassment" by York manager McEwan, and Accrington then upped their bid to a six-figure fee, but were told that Donaldson was not for sale.

Donaldson was suspended for three matches following his 51st-minute red card for using his elbow in York's 2–1 defeat away to Kidderminster Harriers on 20 January 2007. York rejected a bid from Scunthorpe for Donaldson, with their approach falling short of York's valuation, after which Scunthorpe manager Nigel Adkins said he would not pay "stupid money" for Donaldson. On 29 January 2007, Hibernian announced that Donaldson had signed a pre-contract agreement with them for a three-year contract, effective in the summer. As he was 23 years old a month later, York were not entitled to any compensation under FIFA regulations. York later turned down a £50,000 offer from Hibernian, which would have allowed them to bring Donaldson to the club immediately. York manager McEwan wanted Donaldson to give his complete commitment for York for the rest of the season, who also revealed that the club intended to fight against the "international loophole" that meant Donaldson could join Hibernian for free. Donaldson's agent, Andy Sprott, said suggestions he deliberately found Donaldson a transfer in Scotland so York would not receive any compensation were "not the case".

Donaldson returned from his suspension for York's reserves against Sheffield United on 6 February 2007, but the match was frozen off, and he eventually returned in a 4–0 away win over Altrincham on 10 February 2007. His first goals since his suspension came against Cambridge United, with a hat-trick on 13 March 2007. Donaldson insisted he remained fully committed to York, after speculation concerning his commitment grew in April 2007. In the play-off semi-final second leg away to Morecambe on 7 May 2007, Donaldson collided with the onrushing opposition goalkeeper Steven Drench in the penalty area while trying to collect the ball. With Donaldson still groggy, York's penalty was taken by Steve Bowey, who successfully converted in the 20th minute. However, York lost the match 2–1 and were eliminated on aggregate. Donaldson finished 2006–07 with 26 goals for York from 48 appearances, including 24 goals in the Conference National, meaning he was the division's third top scorer.

=== Hibernian ===
Donaldson made his Scottish Premier League debut for Hibernian in a 1–0 away win over their rivals Hearts on 6 August 2007, his first league goal coming against Falkirk on 15 September, after winning and scoring a penalty. Donaldson was sent off in this match, resulting in a one-match suspension. His first match back was his home debut against Motherwell in the Scottish League Cup on 26 September 2007, starting in place of the injured Steven Fletcher. Donaldson scored in the 11th minute after a solo run, beating two defenders and shooting under goalkeeper Graeme Smith, although Hibs lost the match 4–2. He scored his first hat-trick for Hibs in a 4–1 home win Kilmarnock on 29 September 2007.

He was linked with a move to League One club Crewe Alexandra in February 2008, having been unable to figure in Mixu Paatelainen's plans at Hibs, meaning he was frozen out of the first team. Donaldson finished 2007–08 with 21 appearances and 6 goals, his last goal of the season coming against Falkirk in December 2007. In the summer of 2008, he was told that he was available for transfer by Hibs. Crewe were believed to be lining up a bid for him in July 2008, who had money available after selling striker Nicky Maynard to Bristol City for £2.25 million and held negotiations with Donaldson. The move stalled after a six-figure fee had been agreed but Donaldson later agreed personal terms.

=== Crewe Alexandra ===
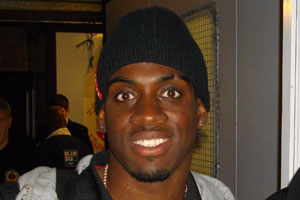
Donaldson with Crewe Alexandra in 2010

Donaldson's move to League One club Crewe Alexandra was completed on 18 August 2008 on a three-year contract for an undisclosed six-figure fee. The contract could not be signed until international clearance was given from the Scottish Football Association, which was received on 22 August 2008. He made his debut as an 81st-minute substitute in a 2–1 home victory against Walsall on 23 August 2008. Donaldson's former club York made an attempt to re-sign him on loan in October 2008, but were told to make an inquiry four weeks later as he was injured. Despite this, he came on as a substitute in Crewe's 3–0 away defeat to Scunthorpe on 11 October 2008, which was followed a week later by his first start in a 2–2 home draw with Milton Keynes Dons. He scored his first Crewe goals against Huddersfield Town on 1 November 2008 in a match that eventually finished as a 3–2 away defeat. He displayed the ability of long throw-ins, which he initially developed while in the Hull youth team, on several occasions, including a 3–2 home victory over Scunthorpe on 17 January 2009, a match in which he also scored. He scored three goals in four matches later in the season, with the final goal, against Carlisle United, proving to be his last of 2008–09. Donaldson finished the season with 43 appearances and 7 goals.

He broke his fibula during August 2009, which resulted in him being ruled out of playing for eight weeks. He finished 2009–10 with 39 appearances and 13 goals. His first appearance of 2010–11 came in the opening match, a 1–0 home defeat to Hereford on 7 August 2010, in which he missed an early opportunity to score, shooting wide of the goal having been one-on-one with goalkeeper Adam Bartlett. His first goals of the season came after scoring twice in a 7–0 home victory over Barnet on 21 August 2010, the first a shot into the bottom left of the goal and the second a close-range header. He finished the season with 48 appearances and 29 goals, including 28 goals in the League Two, making him the division's top scorer.

=== Brentford ===
Donaldson signed a three-year contract with League One club Brentford on 1 July 2011 on a free transfer. He was named Brentford's Player of the Year for 2012–13, in which he scored 24 goals from 56 appearances. After helping Brentford gain promotion into the Championship in 2013–14 as League One runners-up, manager Mark Warburton confirmed that Donaldson would be offered a new contract with the club.

=== Birmingham City ===
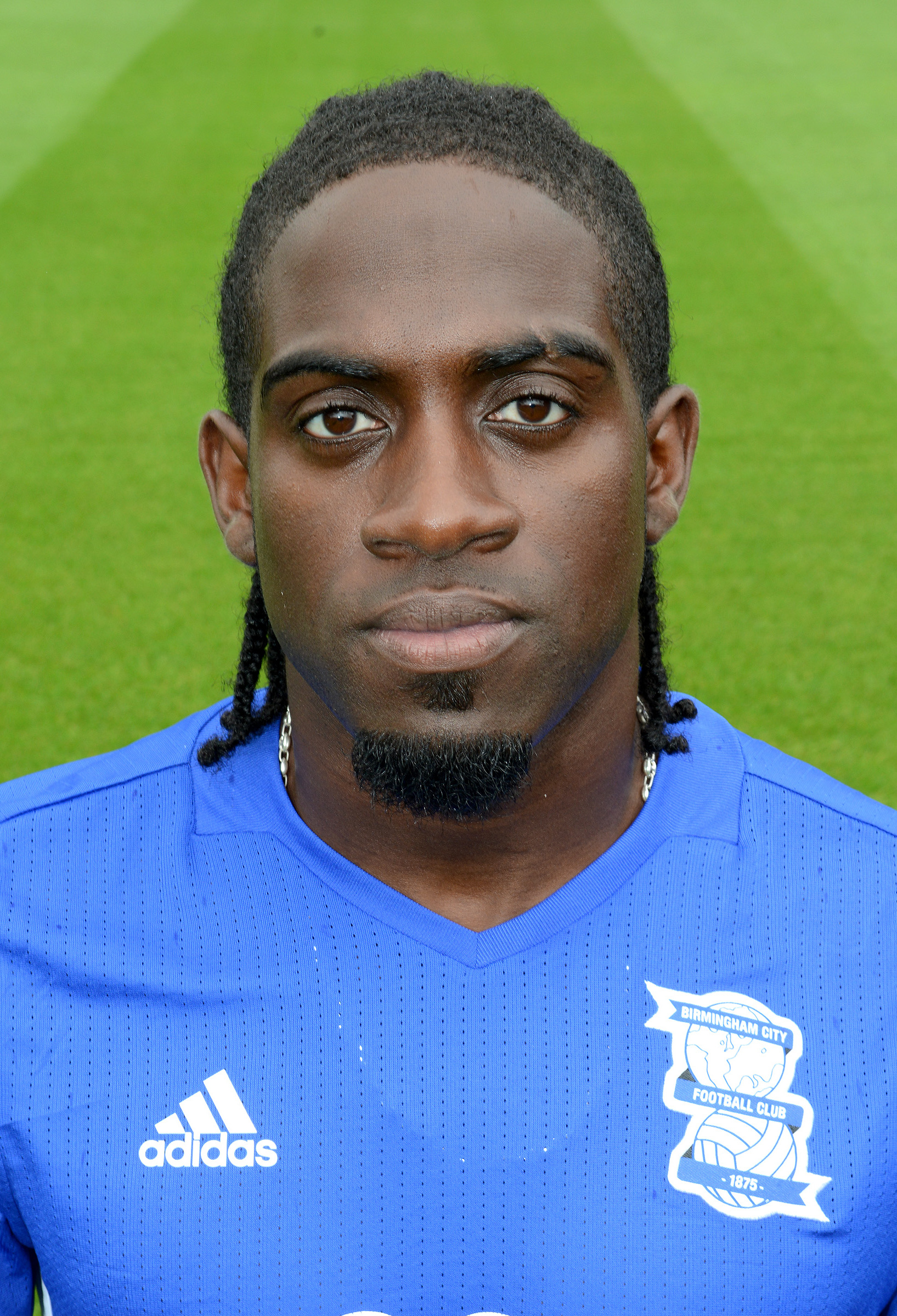
Donaldson with Birmingham City in 2016

Donaldson turned down Brentford's contract offer, and signed a two-year contract with their 2014–15 Championship rivals Birmingham City, to begin on 1 July 2014 when his Brentford contract expired. He made his debut as a second-half substitute in the opening-day defeat at Middlesbrough, opened the scoring as Birmingham beat Cambridge United 3–1 at St Andrew's in the League Cup, and collected Wes Thomas's through ball to run on and score in a 2–2 home draw with Ipswich Town on 19 August 2014. Although attracting praise for his general play, Donaldson was disappointed with his lack of goals; by the end of October 2014, he had added only one more.

A change of management and change of formation – Gary Rowett preferred to play Donaldson as a lone striker – brought a change of fortune in front of goal. He scored both goals in a 2–1 home win against Watford, who had been on a nine-match unbeaten run, and followed up with the only goal of the visit to Rotherham United, when his shot was parried back out to him and he was alert enough to produce a more accurate and powerful second attempt. Donaldson's "customary selfless performance" was rewarded with a two goals in a 3–1 away win over Nottingham Forest, and a hat-trick against Wigan Athletic prompted thoughts of a 20-goal season. An eight-week lean spell put paid to that target – he finished 2014–15 with 16 goals in all competitions, 15 in the league, – but his efforts for the team were recognised with both Players' Player and Supporters' Player of the Season awards.

In the first month of 2015–16, Donaldson provided four assists for teammates but did not score himself. At home to Bristol City on 12 September 2015, he completed a first-half hat-trick; the match ended 4–2. His fifth goal of the season came in a 5–2 away win against Fulham on 7 November 2015, the last match before he made his international debut for Jamaica. He returned with a groin injury that was predicted to keep him out for six weeks. Rowett suggested the damage could have been less serious had Donaldson not played the whole match despite being obviously unfit, but Jamaica coach Winfried Schäfer denied the accusations, stating that he had wanted to substitute Donaldson but the player insisted on continuing. He returned to first-team action on 26 December 2015, as a late substitute with Birmingham already 3–0 down at Sheffield Wednesday, and remained in the starting eleven thereafter, although it took some time for his rhythm and form to return. Donaldson was also used on the left wing in support of loan striker Kyle Lafferty. He said he enjoyed that position "because strikers are always getting battered and from there you can sneak in unopposed", although it had not gone as well for him this season as he had hoped. By the end of the season, which he finished as the club's top scorer with 11 goals from 40 league appearances as well as contributing 7 assists, he claimed to be "back to [his] normal self".

Away to Wigan Athletic on 16 August 2016, Donaldson's penalty was saved, although the encroaching David Davis scored from the rebound to give Birmingham a lead they failed to protect. Two weeks later, he converted a penalty to open his account for the season before taking advantage of a defensive error to complete a 3–0 win over Norwich City. In the next match, Donaldson again missed a penalty, then ignored managerial orders that Jacques Maghoma should take any further spot kick and scored the winning goal from the penalty awarded after 49 minutes. After the match, Rowett confirmed that Donaldson would remain as designated taker, but advised him to practise. He duly scored from the spot in the very next match. Donaldson's sixth goal, again a penalty, came against Ipswich Town in December. He was stretchered off soon afterwards with an Achilles tendon injury which kept him out for three months, by which time the team were in a relegation battle under the management of Gianfranco Zola, who had taken over the day after the Ipswich match. He made four appearances, with only one start, before a knee injured in training forced him out until the last 20 minutes of the final match, away to Bristol City, in which he helped Birmingham defend a 1–0 lead to avoid relegation.

Harry Redknapp had come in as manager for Birmingham's last three matches of 2016–17, and agreed to stay on for the new season. Donaldson started the first four league matches – he did not score, but against Burton Albion he combined with strike partner Lukas Jutkiewicz to create a goal for Maghoma – and took his Birmingham record to 33 goals from 117 appearances in all competitions. Redknapp completely revamped the team during the last couple of weeks of the transfer window, bringing in two strikers and other attacking players, and late on deadline day, Donaldson moved on.

=== Sheffield United ===
Donaldson signed a one-year contract with another Championship club, Sheffield United, on 31 August 2017. The undisclosed fee was described by the Birmingham Mail as "nominal". After scoring both of his team's goals in a 2–1 away win against Sunderland on his debut on 9 September, Sheffield United manager Chris Wilder commented: "Not bad for 50 grand that, is it? Not bad from Aldi... We are delighted to get Clayton. He's a good kid. I know a lot about him. I've tried to sign him enough times, I should know about him. He said yes to me eventually."

He was released by Sheffield United at the end of the 2017–18 season.

=== Bolton Wanderers ===
Donaldson signed a one-year contract with Championship club Bolton Wanderers on 26 June 2018. His first goal came on 5 January 2019 in the FA Cup third round against Walsall scoring the equaliser in an eventually 5–2 win.

=== Bradford City ===
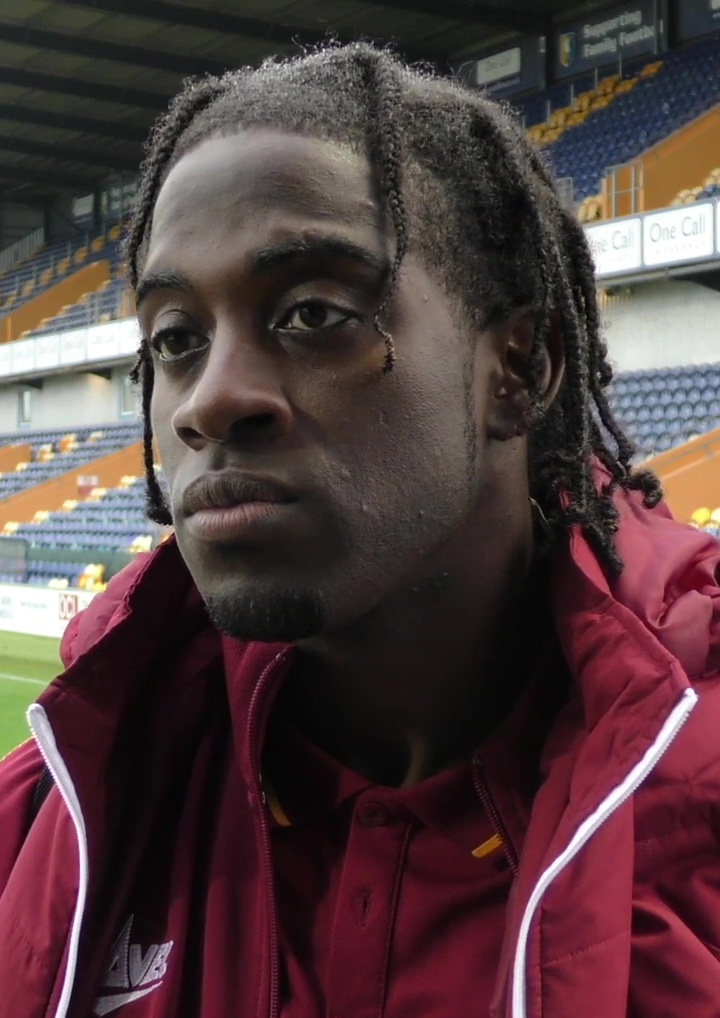
Donaldson with Bradford City in 2020

Donaldson signed for newly relegated League Two club Bradford City on 14 June 2019 on a one-year contract. He became captain in January 2020, after regular captain James Vaughan left the club on loan. In September 2020 he was replaced as captain Richard O'Donnell. He was released by Bradford at the end of the 2020–21 season.

=== Return to York City ===
Donaldson rejoined York City, with the club now in the National League North, on 21 June 2021.

=== Gainsborough Trinity ===
Following his release from York, Donaldson joined Gainsborough Trinity on 6 July 2022.

=== Farsley Celtic ===
National League North club Farsley Celtic signed Donaldson on a free transfer in May 2023. A couple of weeks later, he was appointed head coach in addition to his role as a player. He scored three goals from 39 league appearances, mainly as a starter, and his team avoided relegation on the final day of the season. On 2 September 2024, Donaldson was sacked as manager of Farsley Celtic, however the club retained his registration as a player.

== International career ==
Donaldson was called up by the England National Game XI, who represent England at non-League level, for a European Challenge Trophy match against Belgium in November 2005. He was named in the initial 35-man squad for the Four Nations Tournament in May 2006, but did not make the final 18-man squad. Donaldson finally made the cut when being named in the final 16-man squad for the team to play the Netherlands in November 2006. He made his debut in this match, coming on as a substitute in the last 15 minutes, in which he set up Craig Mackail-Smith for the final goal of a 4–1 victory. This result meant England won the inaugural European Challenge Trophy, topping the table with maximum points. Donaldson was included in the squad to play Northern Ireland in February 2007, although York manager McEwan contemplated withdrawing Donaldson from the squad, after his comeback for York against Altrincham in February 2007. Donaldson eventually started against Northern Ireland, but was substituted after 50 minutes for Paul Benson, who scored England's only goal two minutes after coming on in a 3–1 defeat. This was the final of two caps he earned for England National Game XI.

In April 2015, Donaldson stated that he wanted to play for Jamaica, his parents' country. He had hoped to be selected for the 2015 Copa América or for the Gold Cup, but did not receive his Jamaican passport in time. He was called up for 2018 FIFA World Cup qualifiers in November 2015 against Panama and Haiti, and made his full international debut in the first of those matches, at Independence Park in Kingston on 13 November. He entered the match with Jamaica already 2–0 down, replacing Darren Mattocks after 62 minutes, but was unable to affect the score. Donaldson started against Haiti, and scored the only goal of the match after 62 minutes with a header from a corner.

== Coaching career ==
In November 2024, Donaldson was appointed Head of Development at former club York City.

== Personal life ==
His brother, Jahsiah Donaldson, was a schoolboy with Leeds United before injury ended his career. In June 2014, Donaldson married Pippa (née Fulton) and their son Hendrix was born in August 2015.

== Career statistics ==
=== Club ===
As of end of 2023–24 season

Appearances and goals by club, season and competition
Club	Season	League			National cup (Note: Includes FA Cup, Scottish Cup)		League cup (Note: Includes Scottish League Cup, Football League Cup/EFL Cup)		Other		Total	
Club	Season	Division	Apps	Goals	Apps	Goals	Apps	Goals	Apps	Goals	Apps	Goals
Hull City	2002–03	Third Division	2	0	—		0	0	1 (Note: Appearance(s) in Football League Trophy)	1	3	1
Hull City	2003–04	Third Division	0	0	0	0	0	0	2	0	2	0
Hull City	2004–05	League One	0	0	—		0	0	—		0	0
Hull City	Total		2	0	0	0	0	0	3	1	5	1
Harrogate Town (loan)	2002–03	Northern Premier League; Premier Division	6	2	—		—				6	2
Scarborough (loan)	2003–04	Football Conference	2	0	—		—		—		2	0
Halifax Town (loan)	2003–04	Football Conference	4	0	—		—		0	0	4	0
Harrogate Town (loan)	2004–05	Conference North	8	3	2	1	—		1 (Note: Appearance(s) in FA Trophy)	0	11	4
York City	2005–06	Conference National	42	17	2	1	—		1	0	45	18
York City	2006–07	Conference National	43	24	2	1	—		3 (Note: One appearance and one goal in FA Trophy, two appearances in Conference National play-offs)	1	48	26
York City	Total		85	41	4	2	—		4	1	93	44
Hibernian	2007–08	Scottish Premier League	18	5	1	0	2	1	—		21	6
Hibernian	2008–09	Scottish Premier League	0	0	—		—		0	0	0	0
Hibernian	Total		18	5	1	0	2	1	0	0	21	6
Crewe Alexandra	2008–09	League One	37	6	3	1	1	0	2	0	43	7
Crewe Alexandra	2009–10	League Two	37	13	1	0	1	0	0	0	39	13
Crewe Alexandra	2010–11	League Two	43	28	1	0	2	0	2	1	48	29
Crewe Alexandra	Total		117	47	5	1	4	0	4	1	130	49
Brentford	2011–12	League One	46	11	2	0	1	0	2	0	51	11
Brentford	2012–13	League One	44	18	7	4	1	0	4 (Note: One appearance in Football League Trophy, three appearances and two goals in League One play-offs)	2	56	24
Brentford	2013–14	League One	46	17	2	1	0	0	0	0	48	18
Brentford	Total		136	46	11	5	2	0	6	2	155	53
Birmingham City	2014–15	Championship	46	15	0	0	2	1	—		48	16
Birmingham City	2015–16	Championship	40	11	0	0	1	0	—		41	11
Birmingham City	2016–17	Championship	23	6	0	0	1	0	—		24	6
Birmingham City	2017–18	Championship	4	0	—		0	0	—		4	0
Birmingham City	Total		113	32	0	0	4	1	—		117	33
Sheffield United	2017–18	Championship	26	5	3	0	—		—		29	5
Bolton Wanderers	2018–19	Championship	31	1	2	1	1	0	—		34	2
Bradford City	2019–20	League Two	20	4	0	0	0	0	1 (Note: Appearance(s) in EFL Trophy)	0	21	4
Bradford City	2020–21	League Two	35	4	2	2	2	0	2	1	41	7
Bradford City	Total		55	8	2	2	2	0	3	1	62	11
York City	2021–22	National League North	33	8	5	4	—		9 (Note: Six appearances and two goals in FA Trophy, three appearances in National League North play-offs)	2	47	14
Gainsborough Trinity	2022–23	Northern Premier League; Premier Division	42	22	4	2	—		2 (Note: One appearance and one goal in FA Trophy, one appearance in Northern Premier League play-offs)	1	48	25
Farsley Celtic	2023–24	National League North	39	3	1	0	—		0	0	40	3
Career total			717	223	40	18	15	2	32	9	804	252

=== International ===
Appearances and goals by national team and year
National team	Year	Apps	Goals
Jamaica	2015	2	1
Jamaica	2016	8	1
Total		10	2

Jamaica score listed first, score column indicates score after each Donaldson goal

List of international goals scored by Clayton Donaldson
No.	Date	Venue	Cap	Opponent	Score	Result	Competition	Ref.
1	17 November 2015	Stade Sylvio Cator, Port-au-Prince, Haiti	2	Haiti	1–0	1–0	2018 FIFA World Cup qualification	
2	27 May 2016	Estadio Sausalito, Viña del Mar, Chile	5	Chile	1–0	2–1	Friendly	

== Honours ==
England National Game XI

- European Challenge Trophy: 2005–06

Individual

- York City Clubman of the Year: 2005–06
- Brentford Player of the Year: 2012–13
