= Lewis McMahon =

English footballer

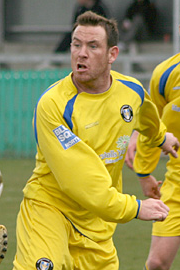
- McMahon playing for Gainsborough Trinity in 2009

Personal information
- Full name: Lewis James McMahon
- Date of birth: 2 May 1985 (age 41)
- Place of birth: Doncaster, England
- Height: 5 ft 9 in (1.75 m)
- Position: Midfielder

Team information
- Current team: Floreat Athena

Youth career
- –2004: Sheffield Wednesday

Senior career*
Years	Team	Apps	(Gls)
2004–2005	Sheffield Wednesday	25	(2)
2005–2006	Notts County	29	(0)
2006–2007	York City	19	(1)
2007–2012	Gainsborough Trinity	153	(37)
2012	→ Matlock Town (loan)		
2012–2014	Matlock Town		
2013	→ Gainsborough Trinity (loan)	5	(5)
2014	North Ferriby United	8	(1)
2014–	Floreat Athena		

International career
2009	England C	1	(0)
- * Club domestic league appearances and goals as of 12:38, 26 September 2015 (UTC)

Lewis James McMahon (born 2 May 1985) is an English semi-professional footballer who plays as a midfielder for Australian Football West Premier League club Floreat Athena.

He has previously played for Sheffield Wednesday, Notts County, York City, Gainsborough Trinity, Matlock Town and North Ferriby United.

== Club career ==
=== Sheffield Wednesday ===
Born in Doncaster, South Yorkshire, McMahon started his career with Sheffield Wednesday. Signed as a trainee, he made his first senior start playing the full ninety minutes in a South Yorkshire Derby against Second Division rivals Barnsley on 13 March 2004 at Hillsborough in front of 25,664 supporters. The results was a 2–1 victory with Guylain Ndumbu-Nsungu grabbing both goals either side of half time. He continued to make eight more starting appearances that season and also make two as a substitute. Next season, McMahon made 17 more appearances and scored his first two senior goals, the first of which was a drive against Blackpool to gain a 2–1 win and the first points of the season. However, McMahon was released by Wednesday at the end of the 2004–05 season.

=== Notts County ===
McMahon was signed by Notts County on a one-year deal in July 2005 following his release by Sheffield Wednesday. McMahon left County at the end of 2005–06.

=== York City ===
McMahon was signed by Conference National club York City on 18 August 2006 after he left Notts County. He was released by York at the end of 2006–07. Following his release, McMahon said: "We did have a good team but, towards the back half of the season, if anyone went to see me playing for the reserves they will have seen me stand out. I was scoring quite a few goals and doing really well. I also lost a stone in weight and did everything the gaffer asked of me so I was a bit gutted not to get a chance to do it in the first team."

=== Gainsborough Trinity ===
McMahon joined Conference North club Gainsborough Trinity on 23 July 2007. On 25 February 2012, McMahon joined Northern Premier League Premier Division club Matlock Town on a one-month loan. He returned to Trinity and was an unused substitute in the club's play-off matches, which saw them lose in the final to Nuneaton Town. He was released by Trinity in May 2012.

=== Matlock Town ===
McMahon signed for Matlock permanently on 27 June 2012, and was their top scorer in 2012–13 with 24 goals. He returned to Gainsborough on a one-month loan on 22 November 2013, and scored five goals from five matches.

=== Later career ===
McMahon joined Conference North club North Ferriby United on 7 February 2014. He was an unused substitute in their play-off semi-final matches, but played as a substitute in the 5–2 win over Bridlington Town in the East Riding Senior Cup final on 13 May 2014. McMahon moved to Australia and signed for Australian Football West Premier League club Floreat Athena later in 2014.

== International career ==
McMahon was called up to the England national C team for their match against Malta in February 2009. He started the match as captain, before being substituted in the 46th minute, as England won 4–0.

== Career statistics ==
As of match played 13 May 2014

Appearances and goals by club, season and competition
Club	Season	League			FA Cup		League Cup		Other		Total	
Club	Season	Division	Apps	Goals	Apps	Goals	Apps	Goals	Apps	Goals	Apps	Goals
Sheffield Wednesday	2003–04	Second Division	10	0	0	0	0	0	1 (Note: Appearance in Football League Trophy)	0	11	0
Sheffield Wednesday	2004–05	League One	15	2	1	0	2	0	2 (Note: One appearance in Football League Trophy, one in League One play-offs)	0	20	2
Sheffield Wednesday	Total		25	2	1	0	2	0	3	0	31	2
Notts County	2005–06	League Two	29	0	2	1	0	0	1	1	32	2
York City	2006–07	Conference National	19	1	0	0	—		1 (Note: Appearance(s) in FA Trophy)	0	20	1
Gainsborough Trinity	2007–08	Conference North	35	9	3	0	—		2	0	40	9
Gainsborough Trinity	2008–09	Conference North	35	12	1	0	—		1 (Note: Appearance in Conference League Cup)	1	37	13
Gainsborough Trinity	2009–10	Conference North	32	10	0	0	—		5	1	37	11
Gainsborough Trinity	2010–11	Conference North	34	4	1	1	—		1	0	36	5
Gainsborough Trinity	2011–12	Conference North	17	2	4	0	—		1	0	22	2
Gainsborough Trinity	Total		153	37	9	1	—		10	2	172	40
Gainsborough Trinity (loan)	2013–14	Conference North	5	5	—		—		—		5	5
North Ferriby United	2013–14	Conference North	8	1	—		—		2 (Note: Appearances in East Riding Senior Cup)	0	10	1
Career total			239	46	12	1	2	0	17	3	270	50
