= 2006–07 York City F.C. season =

Association football club season

York City F.C.
2006–07 season
- Managing director: Jason McGill
- Manager: Billy McEwan
- Ground: Bootham Crescent
- Conference National: 4th
- Play-offs: Semi-final (eliminated by Morecambe)
- FA Cup: First round (eliminated by Bristol City)
- FA Trophy: First round (eliminated by Morecambe)
- Top goalscorer: League: Clayton Donaldson (24); All: Clayton Donaldson (26)
- Highest home attendance: 6,660 vs Morecambe, play-offs, 4 May 2007
- Lowest home attendance: 2,132 vs Northwich Victoria, Conference National, 6 March 2007
- Average home league attendance: 2,859
Home colours	Away colours

The 2006–07 season was the 85th season of competitive association football and third season in the Football Conference played by York City Football Club, a professional football club based in York, North Yorkshire, England. They finished in fourth place in the 24-team 2006–07 Conference National, qualifying for the play-offs, in which they were eliminated in the semi-final by Morecambe.

York entered the 2006–07 FA Cup in the fourth qualifying round, beating Newcastle Benfield (Bay Plastics) away before losing at home to Bristol City in the first round. They were knocked out in the first round of the 2006–07 FA Trophy, being beaten by their eventual play-off opponents Morecambe.

28 players made at least one appearance in nationally organised first-team competition, and there were 12 different goalscorers. Striker Craig Farrell played in all 51 first-team matches over the season. Clayton Donaldson finished as leading goalscorer with 26 goals, of which 24 came in league competition, one came in the FA Cup one came in the FA Trophy. The winner of the Clubman of the Year award was Neal Bishop.

== Background and pre-season ==
New home and away kits were brought in for the first time in two years. The home kit included red shirts with a white collar, bar a section under the neck which was red, and white trims on the sleeves, white shorts and red socks. The away kit comprised yellow shirts with a green collar, bar a section under the neck which was yellow, and white trims on the sleeves, blue shorts and blue socks. CLP Industries continued as shirt sponsors for the second successive season.

Pre-season match details
Date	Opponents	Venue	Result	Score F–A	Scorers	Attendance	Ref.
21 July 2006	Gainsborough Trinity	A	L	1–2	Wilkinson (Note: Trialist) 63'		
25 July 2006	Middlesbrough	H	L	0–1		1,342	
28 July 2006	Darlington	H	L	0–2		598	
1 August 2006	Leeds United reserves	H	W	2–0	Donaldson 20', Craddock 47'	1,511	

== Match details ==
Dates and attendances are sourced by Batters. League positions are sourced by Statto. The remaining information is referenced individually.

=== Conference National ===
Conference National match details
Date	League position	Opponents	Venue	Result	Score F–A	Scorers	Attendance	Ref.
12 August 2006	11th	Exeter City	H	D	0–0		2,789	
15 August 2006	5th	Stevenage Borough	A	W	2–1	Donaldson 6', Bowey 64'	2,306	
19 August 2006	4th	Gravesend & Northfleet	A	W	1–0	Donaldson 33'	1,036	
25 August 2006	1st	Burton Albion	H	W	3–2	Donaldson 8', Convery 61, Peat 90'	2,812	
28 August 2006	4th	Rushden & Diamonds	A	W	1–0	Donaldson 49'	2,416	
1 September 2006	2nd	Stafford Rangers	H	D	0–0		2,955	
9 September 2006	6th	Crawley Town	A	L	0–3		932	
12 September 2006	7th	Morecambe	H	L	2–3	Woolford 49', Donaldson 75' pen.	2,233	
16 September 2006	6th	Kidderminster Harriers	H	W	1–0	Donaldson 43'	2,181	
19 September 2006	5th	Woking	A	W	2–1	Woolford (2) 28', 41'	1,907	
23 September 2006	3rd	Southport	H	D	2–2	Farrell 21', Hoolickin 77' o.g.	2,446	
30 September 2006	7th	Oxford United	A	L	0–2		6,602	
3 October 2006	4th	Northwich Victoria	A	W	2–1	Donaldson 31', Peat 90'	1,021	
6 October 2006	3rd	Aldershot Town	H	W	1–0	Convery 12'	2,679	
10 October 2006	4th	Cambridge United	H	L	1–2	Donaldson 22'	2,614	
14 October 2006	4th	St Albans City	A	L	2–4	Farrell (2) 25', 66'	1,237	
21 October 2006	6th	Tamworth	A	D	2–2	Donaldson (2) 10', 32'	1,311	
5 November 2006	5th	Altrincham	H	W	1–0	Donaldson 47'	2,726	
18 November 2006	4th	Weymouth	A	W	2–1	Panther 60', Goodliffe 81'	1,774	
25 November 2006	5th	Dagenham & Redbridge	H	L	2–3	Woolford 10', Donaldson 37'	3,050	
2 December 2006	5th	Forest Green Rovers	A	W	1–0	Donaldson 9'	1,125	
9 December 2006	4th	Grays Athletic	A	D	0–0		1,139	
23 December 2006	3rd	Halifax Town	H	W	2–0	Donaldson (2) 5', 67' pen.	3,588	
29 December 2006	4th	Woking	H	L	0–1		3,173	
1 January 2007	3rd	Morecambe	A	W	3–1	Donaldson 45', Farrell 47', Bowey 61'	2,203	
6 January 2007	3rd	Crawley Town	H	W	5–0	Donaldson (2) 20' pen., 53', Bowey 21', Panther 32', Farrell 73'	2,590	
20 January 2007	3rd	Kidderminster Harriers	A	L	1–2	Farrell 83'	2,073	
23 January 2007	3rd	Halifax Town	A	D	1–1	Woolford 57'	2,308	
27 January 2007	3rd	Grays Athletic	H	D	2–2	Bowey 5', McMahon 13'	2,689	
3 February 2007	3rd	Tamworth	H	L	0–2		2,477	
10 February 2007	3rd	Altrincham	A	W	4–0	Bishop 1', Bowey 8', Brodie 66', Woolford 90'	1,327	
17 February 2007	3rd	Weymouth	H	W	1–0	Bowey 90'	2,769	
24 February 2007	4th	Dagenham & Redbridge	A	L	1–2	Bishop 62'	2,252	
3 March 2007	3rd	Forest Green Rovers	H	D	0–0		2,923	
6 March 2007	3rd	Northwich Victoria	H	W	2–1	Charnock 55' o.g., Woolford 69'	2,132	
10 March 2007	3rd	Aldershot Town	A	W	2–0	Farrell 25', Panther 90'	2,435	
13 March 2007	3rd	Cambridge United	A	W	5–0	Farrell 21', Donaldson (3) 33', 63', 72', Kovács 47'	2,428	
17 March 2007	3rd	St Albans City	H	D	0–0		2,927	
24 March 2007	3rd	Exeter City	A	D	1–1	Farrell 58'	4,410	
27 March 2007	3rd	Stevenage Borough	H	L	0–1		2,969	
31 March 2007	4th	Gravesend & Northfleet	H	L	0–2		2,709	
7 April 2007	4th	Burton Albion	A	W	2–1	Woolford 71', Farrell 80'	2,718	
10 April 2007	4th	Rushden & Diamonds	H	W	3–1	Donaldson (2) 41', 50', Bowey 54'	2,955	
14 April 2007	5th	Stafford Rangers	A	D	0–0		1,293	
21 April 2007	4th	Southport	A	W	1–0	Donaldson 56' pen.	3,206	
28 April 2007	4th	Oxford United	H	W	1–0	Bishop 38'	5,378	

=== League table (part) ===
Final Conference National table (part)
Pos	Club	Pld	W	D	L	F	A	GD	Pts
2nd	Oxford United	46	22	15	9	66	33	+33	81
3rd	Morecambe	46	23	12	11	64	46	+18	81
4th	York City	46	23	11	12	65	45	+20	80
5th	Exeter City	46	22	12	12	67	48	+19	78
6th	Burton Albion	46	22	9	15	52	47	+5	75
Key	Pos = League position; Pld = Matches played; W = Matches won; D = Matches drawn; L = Matches lost; F = Goals for; A = Goals against; GD = Goal difference; Pts = Points								
Source									

=== FA Cup ===
FA Cup match details
Round	Date	Opponents	Venue	Result	Score F–A	Scorers	Attendance	Ref.
Fourth qualifying round	28 October 2006	Newcastle Benfield (Bay Plastics)	A	W	1–0	Donaldson 8' pen.	988	
First round	11 November 2006	Bristol City	H	L	0–1		3,525	

=== FA Trophy ===
FA Trophy match details
Round	Date	Opponents	Venue	Result	Score F–A	Scorers	Attendance	Ref.
First round	16 December 2006	Morecambe	A	L	1–2	Donaldson 79'	1,017	

=== Conference National play-offs ===
Conference National play-offs match details
Round	Date	Opponents	Venue	Result	Score F–A	Scorers	Attendance	Ref.
Semi-final first leg	4 May 2007	Morecambe	H	D	0–0		6,660	
Semi-final second leg	7 May 2007	Morecambe	A	L	1–2; 1–2 agg.	Bowey 20' pen.	5,567	

== Transfers ==
=== In ===
Date	Player	Club†	Fee	Ref.
31 May 2006	Darren Craddock	(Hartlepool United)	Free	
24 June 2006	Steve Bowey	(Queen of the South)	Free	
27 June 2006	Craig Farrell	(Exeter City)	Free	
28 June 2006	David McGurk	(Darlington)	Free	
17 July 2006	Ross Greenwood	(Stockport County)	Free	
20 July 2006	Anthony Lloyd	(Torquay United)	Free	
31 July 2006	Tom Evans	(Scunthorpe United)	Free	
11 August 2006	Simon Weaver	(Scarborough)	Free	
18 August 2006	Lewis McMahon	(Notts County)	Free	
18 August 2006	Daniel Parslow	(Cardiff City)	Free	
31 August 2006	Martyn Woolford	Frickley Athletic	Undisclosed	
31 January 2007	Richard Brodie	Newcastle Benfield (Bay Plastics)	Nominal	

† Brackets around club names denote the player's contract with that club had expired before he joined York.

=== Out ===
Date	Player	Club†	Fee	Ref.
17 August 2006	Simon Weaver	(Tamworth)	Released	
31 January 2007	Byron Webster	(Harrogate Town)	Released	
1 March 2007	Arran Reid	(Stalybridge Celtic)	Released	
16 May 2007	Steve Bowey	(Gateshead)	Released	
16 May 2007	Mark Convery	(Cambridge United)	Released	
16 May 2007	James Dudgeon	(Stalybridge Celtic)	Released	
16 May 2007	Darren Hollingsworth	(Tow Law Town)	Released	
16 May 2007	Anthony Lloyd	(Farsley Celtic)	Released	
16 May 2007	Lewis McMahon	(Gainsborough Trinity)	Released	
16 May 2007	Nathan Peat	(Harrogate Town)	Released	
12 June 2007	Neal Bishop	(Barnet)	Free	
1 July 2007	Clayton Donaldson	(Hibernian)	Free	

† Brackets around club names denote the player joined that club after his York contract expired.

=== Loans in ===
Date	Player	Club	Return	Ref.
5 October 2006	Luke Foster	Lincoln City	Recalled 4 December 2006	
20 October 2006	Jason Goodliffe	Stevenage Borough	21 January 2007	
20 October 2006	Darryn Stamp	Stevenage Borough	10 January 2007	
19 January 2007	Michael Maidens	Hartlepool United	19 February 2007	
31 January 2007	Rob Elvins	West Bromwich Albion	25 March 2007	
2 March 2007	János Kovács	Chesterfield	2 April 2007	
2 March 2007	Richard O'Donnell	Sheffield Wednesday	18 March 2007	
22 March 2007	Craig James	Darlington	End of season	
22 March 2007	Phil Bell	Whitley Bay	End of season	
22 March 2007	Ben Purkiss	Gainsborough Trinity	End of season	
26 March 2007	Paddy Gamble	Nottingham Forest	End of season	

=== Loans out ===
Date	Player	Club	Return	Ref.
17 October 2006	Darren Hollingsworth	Stalybridge Celtic	One-month	
27 March 2007	Darren Hollingsworth	Whitby Town	One-month	

== Appearances and goals ==
Numbers in parentheses denote appearances as substitute.
Players with names struck through and marked † left the club during the playing season.
Players with names in italics and marked * were on loan from another club for the whole of their season with York.
Players listed with no appearances have been in the matchday squad but only as unused substitutes.
Key to positions: GK – Goalkeeper; DF – Defender; MF – Midfielder; FW – Forward

Players included in matchday squads
No.	Pos.	Nat.	Name	League		FA Cup		FA Trophy		Play-offs		Total		Discipline	
No.	Pos.	Nat.	Name	Apps	Goals	Apps	Goals	Apps	Goals	Apps	Goals	Apps	Goals	A yellow rectangle, denoting the yellow penalty card shown to a player being cautioned	A red rectangle, denoting the red penalty card shown to a player being sent off
1	GK	NIR	Tom Evans	45	0	2	0	1	0	2	0	50	0	1	1
2	DF	ENG	Darren Craddock	32 (3)	0	2	0	0 (1)	0	0	0	34 (4)	0	7	1
3	DF	ENG	Nathan Peat	22 (3)	2	0	0	1	0	0 (1)	0	23 (4)	2	4	0
4	MF	ENG	Neal Bishop	42 (3)	3	2	0	0	0	2	0	46 (3)	3	3	0
5	DF	ENG	David McGurk	38	0	0	0	1	0	2	0	41	0	4	0
6	DF	SCO	James Dudgeon	9 (4)	0	0	0	0	0	0	0	9 (4)	0	1	1
7	MF	ENG	Mark Convery	15 (9)	2	0	0	0	0	0 (1)	0	15 (10)	2	1	0
8	MF	SCO	Manny Panther	42 (2)	3	2	0	1	0	2	0	47 (2)	3	6	0
9	FW	ENG	Clayton Donaldson	43	24	2	1	1	1	2	0	48	26	3	1
10	FW	ENG	Craig Farrell	44 (2)	10	2	0	1	0	2	0	49 (2)	10	5	0
11	MF	ENG	Steve Bowey	42	7	2	0	1	0	2	1	47	8	3	1
12	DF	ENG	Anthony Lloyd	23 (7)	0	2	0	1	0	2	0	28 (7)	0	1	0
13	GK	ENG	~~Richard O'Donnell~~ * †	0	0	0	0	0	0	0	0	0	0	0	0
13	GK	ENG	Paddy Gamble *	0	0	0	0	0	0	0	0	0	0	0	0
14	MF	ENG	Ross Greenwood	2 (10)	0	0 (1)	0	0 (1)	0	0	0	2 (12)	0	1	1
15	MF	ENG	~~Byron Webster~~ †	0 (3)	0	0	0	0 (1)	0	0	0	0 (4)	0	0	0
15	DF	ENG	Craig James *	8	0	0	0	0	0	2	0	10	0	1	0
16	DF	ENG	Darren Hollingsworth	0	0	0	0	0	0	0	0	0	0	0	0
17	FW	ENG	Alex Rhodes	0	0	0	0	0	0	0	0	0	0	0	0
18	GK	ENG	~~Arran Reid~~ †	1 (1)	0	0	0	0	0	0	0	1 (1)	0	0	0
18	FW	ENG	Phil Bell *	0 (1)	0	0	0	0	0	0	0	0 (1)	0	0	0
19	DF	ENG	~~Simon Weaver~~ †	0	0	0	0	0	0	0	0	0	0	0	0
19	DF	HUN	~~János Kovács~~ * †	8	1	0	0	0	0	0	0	8	1	1	0
20	DF	WAL	Daniel Parslow	21 (3)	0	0	0	0	0	2	0	23 (3)	0	0	0
21	MF	ENG	Lewis McMahon	8 (11)	1	0	0	1	0	0	0	9 (11)	1	3	0
22	MF	ENG	Martyn Woolford	26 (14)	8	1 (1)	0	1	0	2	0	30 (15)	8	1	0
23	DF	ENG	~~Luke Foster~~ * †	4 (1)	0	2	0	0	0	0	0	6 (1)	0	0	0
23	DF	ENG	Ben Purkiss *	7 (1)	0	0	0	0	0	0	0	7 (1)	0	1	0
24	DF	ENG	~~Jason Goodliffe~~ * †	11	1	2	0	1	0	0	0	14	1	2	0
25	FW	ENG	~~Darryn Stamp~~ * †	5 (5)	0	1 (1)	0	0	0	0	0	6 (6)	0	2	0
26	MF	ENG	~~Michael Maidens~~ * †	1 (2)	0	0	0	0	0	0	0	1 (2)	0	1	0
27	FW	ENG	Richard Brodie	3 (9)	1	0	0	0	0	0 (2)	0	3 (11)	1	0	0
28	FW	ENG	~~Rob Elvins~~ * †	4 (5)	0	0	0	0	0	0	0	4 (5)	0	2	0

== See also ==
- List of York City F.C. seasons
