= Ross Greenwood =

Ross Greenwood may refer to:

- Ross Greenwood (footballer) (born 1985), English footballer
- Ross Greenwood (journalist) (born 1959), Australian journalist
