= Nathan Peat =

English former professional footballer who plays for Bridlington Town

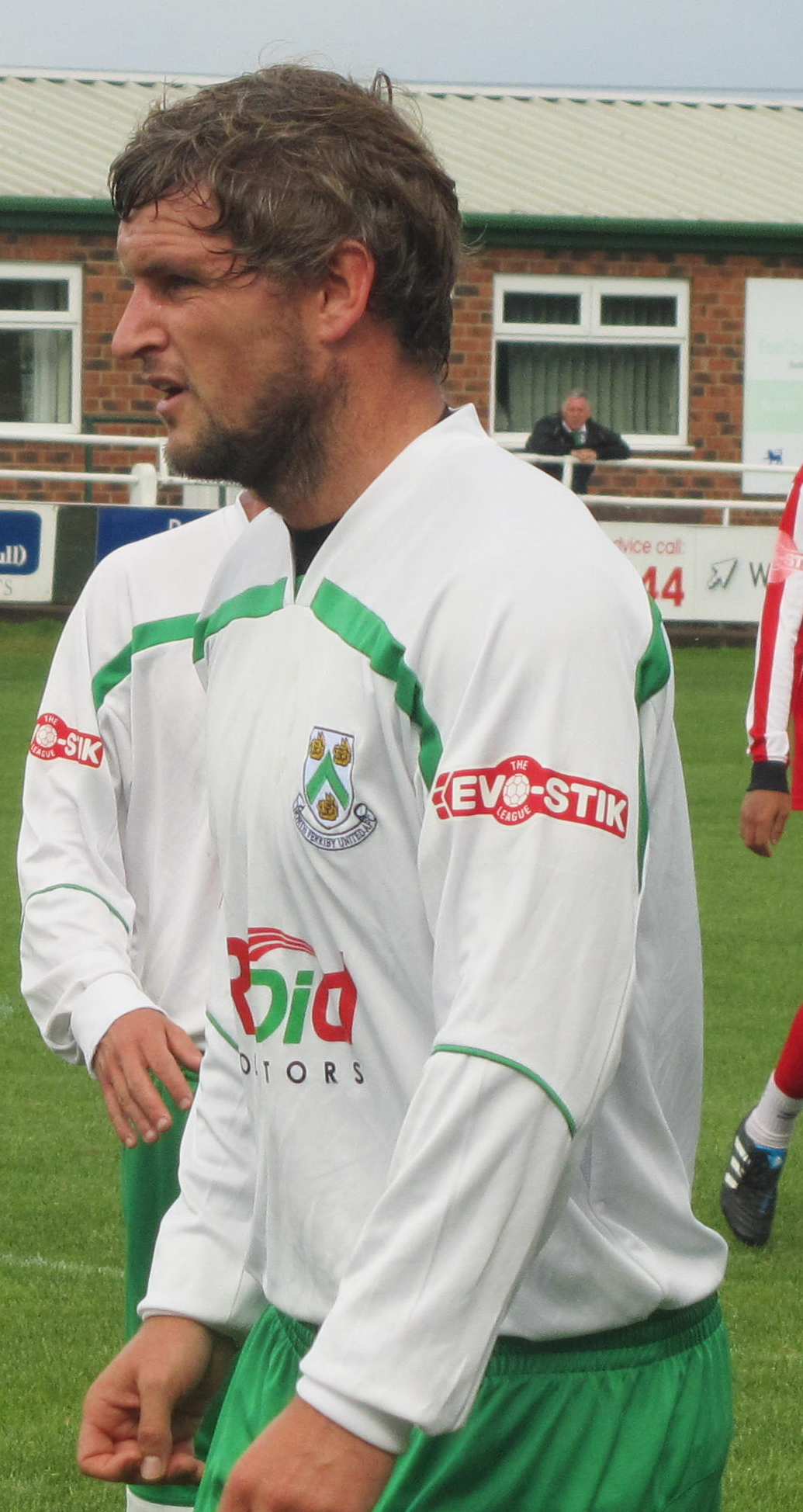
- Peat playing for North Ferriby United in 2011

Personal information
- Full name: Nathan Neil Martin Peat
- Date of birth: 19 September 1982 (age 44)
- Place of birth: Hull, England
- Height: 5 ft 9 in (1.75 m)
- Position: Defender

Team information
- Current team: Brigg Town (manager)

Youth career
- ?–1999: Hull City

Senior career*
Years	Team	Apps	(Gls)
1999–2005	Hull City	2	(0)
2003–2004	→ Cambridge United (loan)	6	(0)
2004–2005	→ Lincoln City (loan)	10	(0)
2005–2007	York City	48	(2)
2007–2009	Harrogate Town	59	(7)
2009–2011	Gainsborough Trinity	?	(?)
2011–2015	North Ferriby United	128	(1)
2015–2016	Scarborough Athletic	0	(0)
2016–2017	Brigg Town		
2017–2020	Bridlington Town		
2020–	Barton Town		
–2022	Brigg Town		

Managerial career
- 2016–2017: Brigg Town
- 2022–: Brigg Town
- * Club domestic league appearances and goals as of 21:30, 16 October 2014 (UTC)

Nathan Neil Martin Peat (born 19 September 1982) is an English former professional footballer. He played for Hull City, Cambridge United, Lincoln City, York City, Harrogate Town, Gainsborough Trinity, North Ferriby United and Scarborough Athletic. He is manager of Brigg Town.

== Career ==
=== Hull City ===
Born in Hull, Humberside, Peat started his career with hometown club Hull City in their youth system, and was a member of the first team squad from 1999 to 2005. He was offered his first professional contract in April 2002 and this was signed on 11 July. A proposed loan move to Harrogate Town of the Northern Premier League collapsed in October 2003 as Hull needed cover at left back. He played for Cambridge United from 2003 to 2004 on loan and for Lincoln City from 2004 to 2005 on loan. Peat was released by Hull City at the end of the 2004–05 season.

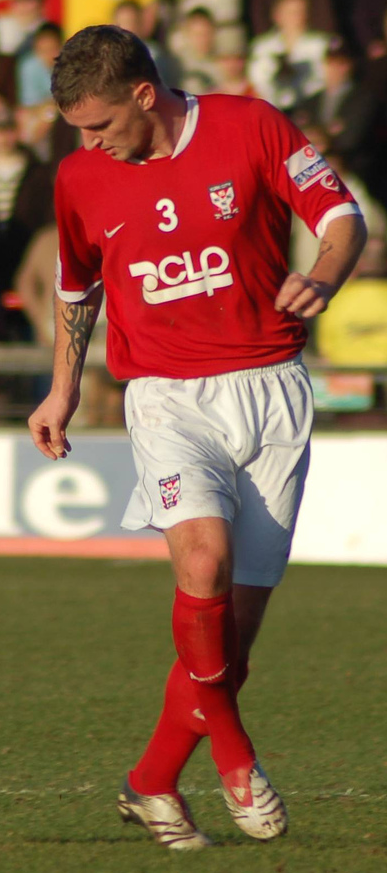
Peat playing for York City in 2007

=== York City ===
After joining York City on trial, and playing in a pre-season friendly at Frickley Athletic in July 2005, the Conference National outfit expressed an interest in signing him. After playing in two more pre-season games against Hartlepool United and Ossett Town he signed for the club on 30 July. Peat signed a new deal at York in July 2006 after being offered a contract extension earlier that summer. On 25 August, Peat scored the winner for York City against Burton Albion from a free kick. He then scored a similar goal from a free kick against Northwich Victoria on 3 October, which was also the match winner. During York's 1–0 defeat to Woking Peat was sent off during a brawl, in which Peat threw several punches. Peat was given a three-match suspension as a result of his red card. In March 2007, Peat was found guilty of violent conduct, and given the punishment of a £200 fine and a two-game ban. He was released by York at the end of the 2006–07 season on 16 May 2007.

=== Harrogate Town ===
Peat joined Conference North side Harrogate on 15 June 2007. Harrogate manager Neil Aspin wanted Peat to sign a new contract with the club in February 2009 following interest from Gainsborough Trinity,

=== Gainsborough Trinity ===
Peat eventually signed for Gainsborough on 12 March 2009. He agreed a new one-year contract with Gainsborough in May 2010.

=== North Ferriby United ===
After being released by Gainsborough following the conclusion of the 2010–11 season, Peat signed for the Northern Premier League Premier Division club North Ferriby United on 28 June 2011. He was a member of the squad that won promotion to the Conference North in 2013 and won the FA Trophy in 2015.

=== Scarborough Athletic ===
In the summer of 2015 Peat signed for Scarborough Athletic. In the summer of 2016 he left to join Brigg Town, where he was appointed joint player-manager alongside Anthony Bowsley.

== Career statistics ==
As of 10 December 2011.

Club	Season	League^{[A]}		FA Cup		League Cup		Other^{[B]}		Total	
Club	Season	Apps	Goals	Apps	Goals	Apps	Goals	Apps	Goals	Apps	Goals
Hull City	1999–2000	0	0	0	0	0	0	0	0	0	0
Hull City	2000–01	0	0	0	0	0	0	0	0	0	0
Hull City	2001–02	0	0	0	0	0	0	0	0	0	0
Hull City	2002–03	1	0	1	0	0	0	1	0	3	0
Hull City	2003–04	1	0	0	0	0	0	2	0	3	0
Hull City	2004–05	0	0	0	0	0	0	0	0	0	0
Hull City	Total	2	0	1	0	0	0	3	0	6	0
Cambridge United (loan)	2003–04	6	0	0	0	0	0	0	0	6	0
Lincoln City (loan)	2004–05	10	0	1	0	2	0	0	0	13	0
York City	2005–06	23	0	1	0	–		0	0	24	0
York City	2006–07	25	2	0	0	–		2	0	27	2
York City	Total	48	2	1	0	–		2	0	51	2
Harrogate Town	2007–08	33	3	0	0	–		0	0	33	3
Harrogate Town	2008–09	26	4	0	0	–		1	0	27	4
Harrogate Town	Total	59	7	0	0	–		1	0	60	7
Gainsborough Trinity	2008–09	8	0	0	0	–		0	0	8	0
Gainsborough Trinity	2009–10	34	2	0	0	–		4	0	38	2
Gainsborough Trinity	Total	42	2	0	0	–		4	0	46	2
North Ferriby United	2011–12	18	0	2	0	–		6	0	26	0
Career totals		185	11	5	0	2	0	16	0	208	11

== Footnotes ==
A. The "League" column constitutes appearances and goals (including those as a substitute) in the Football League, Football Conference and Northern Premier League.
B. The "Other" column constitutes appearances and goals (including those as a substitute) in the East Riding Senior Cup, FA Trophy, Northern Premier League Challenge Cup and play-offs.

== Honours ==
North Ferriby United

- FA Trophy: 2014–15
