= Luke Foster =

English association football player (born 1985)

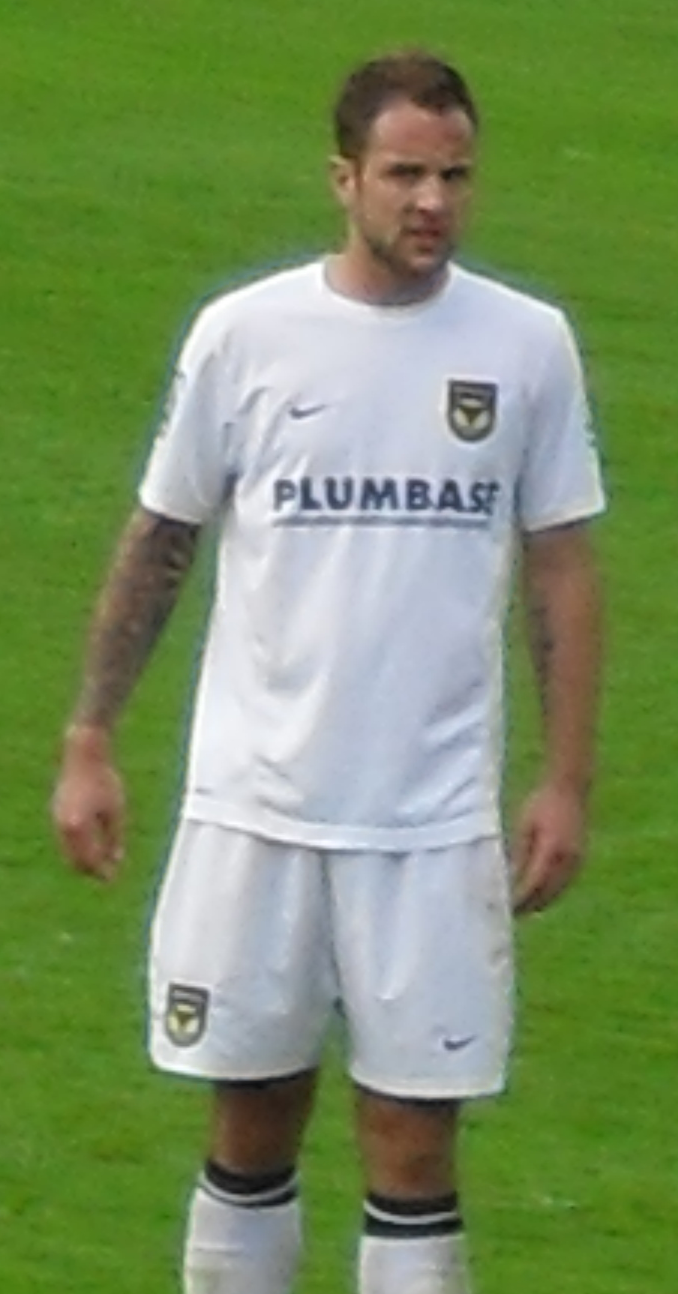
- Foster playing for Oxford United in 2009

Personal information
- Full name: Luke James Foster
- Date of birth: 8 September 1985 (age 41)
- Place of birth: Mexborough, England
- Height: 6 ft 2 in (1.88 m)
- Positions: Centre-back; defensive midfielder

Youth career
- 2002–2004: Sheffield Wednesday

Senior career*
| Years | Team | Apps | (Gls) |
| 2004–2005 | Sheffield Wednesday | 0 | (0) |
| 2004–2005 | → Scarborough (loan) | 7 | (0) |
| 2005 | → Alfreton Town (loan) | 18 | (3) |
| 2005–2007 | Lincoln City | 16 | (1) |
| 2006 | → York City (loan) | 5 | (0) |
| 2007 | Stalybridge Celtic | 4 | (1) |
| 2007–2010 | Oxford United | 101 | (3) |
| 2010 | Mansfield Town | 16 | (0) |
| 2010–2011 | Stevenage | 24 | (1) |
| 2011–2012 | Rotherham United | 5 | (0) |
| 2012 | Matlock Town | 9 | (0) |
| 2012–2013 | Preston North End | 6 | (0) |
| 2013–2014 | Lincoln City | 31 | (1) |
| 2014–2016 | Southport | 64 | (6) |
| 2016 | Harrogate Town | 4 | (0) |
| 2016 | Ilkeston | | |
| 2016–2017 | Coalville Town | | |
| 2017 | North Ferriby United | 0 | (0) |
| 2017 | Brighouse Town | 1 | (0) |
| 2017 | Goole | 4 | (0) |
| 2017 | Barwell | 2 | (0) |
| 2017 | North Ferriby United | 0 | (0) |
| 2018–2020 | Loughborough Dynamo | | |
| Total | | 317 | (16) |

International career
| 2008 | England C | 1 | (0) |
- * Club domestic league appearances and goals

Luke James Foster (born 8 September 1985) is an English former professional footballer who played as a centre-back.

Foster began his career as a trainee at Sheffield Wednesday, signing a professional contract at the age of 18. He joined Scarborough on work experience in September 2004, and was later loaned to Conference North club Alfreton Town in February 2005 for the remainder of the 2004–05 season. Foster signed for Lincoln City in June 2005, during which time he spent two months on loan at York City. In January 2007, Foster was released by Lincoln and signed a short-term contract with Stalybridge Celtic, departing a month later to join Oxford United on an initial six-month deal. Foster went on to make 118 appearances for Oxford during a three-year spell, winning two end-of-season awards.

In January 2010, Foster signed for Mansfield Town, departing after five months to join Stevenage on a two-year contract. He helped the club secure promotion to League One in their first Football League season, before moving to Rotherham United in June 2011. Injuries limited his game time, and he was released after one season. Short spells followed at Matlock Town and Preston North End, before returning to Lincoln City during the 2013–14 season. Foster then spent two years as club captain at Southport, joined Harrogate Town in February 2016, and briefly served as player-coach at Ilkeston, marking his transition into part-time football. Foster went on to represent Coalville Town, Brighouse Town, Goole, Barwell, and Loughborough Dynamo, where he concluded his playing career.

== Early life ==
Born in Mexborough, South Yorkshire, Foster grew up in the county. He attended Wombwell High School.

== Club career ==
=== Early career ===
Foster began his career as a trainee in the Sheffield Wednesday youth academy. In September 2004, he joined Conference National club Scarborough on work experience. Foster made his professional debut in a 1–0 defeat to Hereford United, coming on as a 76th-minute substitute, and went on to make 10 appearances during a two-month spell. He returned to Sheffield Wednesday but did not feature for the first team, and was loaned to Conference North club Alfreton Town in February 2005 for the remainder of the 2004–05 season. He scored three goals in 19 appearances for Alfreton, including his first senior goal in a 3–1 defeat to Southport.

Foster was released by Sheffield Wednesday upon the expiry of his contract and joined League Two club Lincoln City on a one-year contract ahead of the 2005–06 season. He made his debut in the club's opening fixture, a 2–1 defeat to Notts County, and went on to make 19 appearances during the season, scoring once in a 5–0 win against Grimsby Town on 25 March 2006. Despite playing a peripheral role, he signed a one-year contract extension in May 2006. However, Foster did not make a first-team appearance for Lincoln during the 2006–07 season. After training with York City, he joined the Conference National club on a one-month emergency loan on 5 October 2006, brought in to provide cover following a series of injuries in defence. Having made four appearances, the loan was extended for a second month on 3 November 2006. An ankle injury sustained during the final week of the loan led to his return to Lincoln on 4 December 2006. Foster made seven appearances during his loan spell at York.

In January 2007, Foster was informed he was not part of Lincoln's first-team plans and was free to find a new club. He mutually agreed to terminate his contract, subsequently joining Conference North club Stalybridge Celtic on a free transfer. He made his debut for Stalybridge in the FA Trophy, starting in a 1–1 draw against Kettering Town, during which he scored an own goal just before half-time. He registered his first goal for the club in a 2–1 victory over former club Alfreton Town, scoring the match-winner. Foster made six appearances for the club in all competitions, scoring once.

=== Oxford United ===
After a month at Stalybridge, Foster returned to the Conference National, signing for Oxford United on 16 February 2007. He made his debut two weeks later in a 1–0 home defeat to Kidderminster Harriers, and went on to make nine appearances during the remainder of the 2006–07 season, scoring once in a 2–0 win away to St Albans City. He signed a new one-year contract ahead of the 2007–08 season. Having featured just three times in the opening two months of the season, Oxford manager Jim Smith questioned Foster's professionalism and advised him to make changes to improve his first-team prospects. Foster subsequently established himself as a regular starter, although he received a one-match suspension following a red card against Northwich Victoria in March 2008. He made 39 appearances during the season, and was named both Supporters' Player of the Year and Players' Player of the Year at the club's end-of-season awards. His performances earned him a new two-year contract, signed on 29 July 2008.

Foster was sent off twice early in the 2008–09 season: first against Wrexham on 21 August 2008 for denying a clear goalscoring opportunity, causing him to miss two matches, and then against Ebbsfleet United on 30 August 2008, leading to a one-month absence. He returned to the first team and made 44 appearances, scoring once in a 2–1 victory over Lewes, as Oxford narrowly missed out on a place in the Conference Premier play-offs. Foster remained a regular centre-back under manager Chris Wilder during the 2009–10 season, appearing in all of Oxford's matches up to December 2009. In January 2010, Wilder stated that Foster's contract would not be extended upon its expiry in the summer, as Foster wished to explore options with other clubs.

=== Mansfield Town ===
In January 2010, Foster entered negotiations with Cambridge United, although no transfer materialised. Mansfield Town also enquired about signing Foster but initially decided against making an offer, citing his "high wages as the main stumbling block". However, a week later, Mansfield signed Foster on a one-and-a-half-year contract for an undisclosed fee, immediately appointing him club captain. He made his debut in Mansfield's 4–1 victory over Forest Green Rovers on 30 January 2010. Foster was sent off in a 1–0 defeat to York on 16 March 2010, resulting in a two-match suspension. He made 16 appearances for Mansfield in the second half of the 2009–10 season. At the end of the season, Foster posted a comment on his Facebook page describing the club as a "shambles", but later apologised to the club and its supporters. He was released in May 2010, with Mansfield manager David Holdsworth calling it a practical decision for both parties.

=== Stevenage ===
Foster joined newly promoted League Two club Stevenage on a two-year contract on 31 May 2010. He made his debut in the club's first Football League match, a 2–2 draw with Macclesfield Town, playing the full 90 minutes at centre-back. Foster scored his only goal for Stevenage on 3 January 2011, opening the scoring in a 4–2 home victory against Barnet. He received his second red card of the 2010–11 season in a 2–0 defeat to Northampton Town on 30 April 2011, following a foul on Seth Nana Twumasi. Stevenage appealed the decision, which was rejected, resulting in a four-match suspension that ruled Foster out of the final regular league match, a 3–3 draw with Bury, as well as the play-offs. He made 23 appearances in his only season at the club, scoring once, as Stevenage secured promotion to League One with a 1–0 victory over Torquay United in the play-off final.

=== Rotherham United ===
Foster signed for League Two club Rotherham United on 20 June 2011, agreeing a one-year contract with the club, with the option of a further year. He made his debut in a 3–0 home victory against Gillingham on 27 August 2011, coming on as an 84th-minute substitute with Rotherham already holding a three-goal advantage. The following month, having not made another first-team appearance, Foster was made available for loan, with manager Andy Scott citing a lack of desire and fitness. No move materialised, and Foster subsequently made his first start in a 2–0 home victory over Aldershot Town on 5 November 2011, Rotherham's first victory in 10 matches. In December 2011, Scott confirmed that Foster would miss the remainder of the 2011–12 season after sustaining cruciate ligament damage in a 3–2 victory at Hereford United on 10 December 2011. He was released in May 2012, having made six appearances for the club.

=== Matlock Town ===
Ahead of the 2012–13 season, Foster went on trial with League One club Sheffield United. He played in the club's opening pre-season fixture, coming on as a 62nd-minute substitute in a 1–1 draw with Ilkeston. No contract followed, and Foster signed non-contract terms with Northern Premier League Premier Division club Matlock Town to regain match fitness ahead of a return to the professional game. Foster made ten appearances in all competitions before leaving the club in October 2012.

=== Preston North End ===
After a month without a club, Foster went on trial at League One club Preston North End in November 2012, managed by former Stevenage manager Graham Westley. The trial was successful, and he signed on non-contract terms on 18 December 2012. He made his debut that evening in a 3–3 draw against Bury in the Football League Trophy, with Preston progressing via a penalty shoot-out. After impressing Westley in his first four appearances, Foster signed a permanent deal for the remainder of the 2012–13 season. In the following match, a televised 3–2 defeat to Coventry City in the Football League Trophy, Foster scored his only goal for Preston, briefly levelling the score before two injury-time goals secured victory for Coventry. Foster made eight appearances in all competitions, and at the end of the season, new Preston manager Simon Grayson confirmed his contract would not be renewed upon its expiry in June 2013.

=== Return to non-League football ===
Foster rejoined Conference Premier club Lincoln City on 1 August 2013, signing a one-year deal with the club he had previously represented from 2005 to 2007. He made his second debut ten days later, playing the full match in central defence as Lincoln drew 0–0 away at Woking on the opening day of the 2013–14 season. Both of his goals that season came in away fixtures against Braintree Town, and he featured regularly throughout the campaign, making 37 appearances as Lincoln finished 14th amid an inconsistent run of form. He left the club upon the expiry of his contract at the end of the season.

Shortly after becoming a free agent, Foster signed for fellow Conference Premier club Southport on 18 June 2014. He was made club captain ahead of the 2014–15 season. He scored his first goal for the club in his fourth appearance, heading a stoppage-time winner in a 2–1 victory over Altrincham at Haig Avenue on 23 August 2014. Foster made 41 appearances in all competitions that season, scoring four goals, and was named the club's Player of the Year. He was ever present during the first half of the 2015–16 season. However, due to the demands of commuting daily from his home in Barnsley, he joined local National League North club Harrogate Town on 24 February 2016, on a contract until the remainder of the season. He made four appearances, spending most of his time there as an unused substitute, and departed in April 2016.

Foster signed for Ilkeston in May 2016 as a player-coach, his first coaching role. He featured frequently during the opening months of the season, but sustained an injury during an FA Trophy defeat to Barwell in October 2016, which proved to be his final appearance for the club. He left Ilkeston by mutual consent and joined Northern Premier League club Coalville Town on 30 November 2016. Foster spent five months at Coalville before leaving in April 2017, following his appointment as Oldham Athletic's commercial manager on 28 March 2017.

Foster returned to playing in August 2017, signing for National League North club North Ferriby United. After failing to make an appearance during the opening month of the season, he signed for Brighouse Town of the Northern Premier League Division One North in September 2017, making a single appearance. Later that month, he joined divisional rivals Goole, making five appearances during a one-month spell. In November 2017, he joined Barwell, a division above, making two appearances, before briefly rejoining North Ferriby United in December 2017. Initially linked with Loughborough Dynamo in February 2018, Foster eventually signed for the Northern Premier League Division One East club on 14 July 2018, marking the final move of his playing career.

== International career ==
Foster was named on standby for the England C team, who represent England at non-League level, in November 2007 for a match against Finland C, but was ultimately not called up. He received a full call-up in September 2008 for a fixture against Bosnia and Herzegovina in Sarajevo, playing the entire match and assisting Luke Moore's goal in a 6–2 defeat. It was his only appearance for England C.

== Style of play ==
Foster was primarily deployed as a centre-back, though he was also occasionally used as a defensive midfielder during his time at Lincoln City and Stevenage. He was described by manager Graham Westley as a committed and combative defender noted for his determination and physical approach. While at Mansfield Town, Foster highlighted aggression, dominance, and authority as key aspects of his defensive style, particularly when facing physically strong opponents in non-League football.

== Personal life ==
Foster has described himself as a "family man", but acknowledged making poor lifestyle choices in his younger years. He was in a six-year relationship with Rebekah Nicholson, who later married footballer Jamie Vardy. They have one son, born in January 2010.

In April 2024, he was sentenced to three years in prison for running a cannabis farm.

== Career statistics ==
Appearances and goals by club, season and competition
| Club | Season | League | | | FA Cup | | League Cup | | Other | | Total | |
| Club | Season | Division | Apps | Goals | Apps | Goals | Apps | Goals | Apps | Goals | Apps | Goals |
|---|---|---|---|---|---|---|---|---|---|---|---|---|
| Sheffield Wednesday | 2004–05 | League One | 0 | 0 | 0 | 0 | 0 | 0 | 0 | 0 | 0 | 0 |
| Scarborough (loan) | 2004–05 | Conference National | 7 | 0 | 2 | 0 | — | | 1 (Note: Appearance(s) in Football League Trophy) | 0 | 10 | 0 |
| Alfreton Town (loan) | 2004–05 | Conference North | 18 | 3 | — | | — | | 1 (Note: Appearance(s) in FA Trophy) | 0 | 19 | 3 |
| Lincoln City | 2005–06 | League Two | 16 | 1 | 0 | 0 | 0 | 0 | 1 | 0 | 17 | 1 |
| Lincoln City | 2006–07 | League Two | 0 | 0 | — | | 0 | 0 | — | | 0 | 0 |
| Lincoln City | Total | | 16 | 1 | 0 | 0 | 0 | 0 | 1 | 0 | 17 | 1 |
| York City (loan) | 2006–07 | Conference National | 5 | 0 | 2 | 0 | — | | — | | 7 | 0 |
| Stalybridge Celtic | 2006–07 | Conference North | 4 | 1 | — | | — | | 2 | 0 | 6 | 1 |
| Oxford United | 2006–07 | Conference National | 9 | 1 | — | | — | | — | | 9 | 1 |
| Oxford United | 2007–08 | Conference Premier | 32 | 0 | 4 | 0 | — | | 3 (Note: Two appearances in FA Trophy; one appearance in Conference League Cup) | 0 | 39 | 0 |
| Oxford United | 2008–09 | Conference Premier | 39 | 1 | 3 | 0 | — | | 2 | 0 | 44 | 1 |
| Oxford United | 2009–10 | Conference Premier | 21 | 1 | 4 | 0 | — | | 1 | 0 | 26 | 1 |
| Oxford United | Total | | 101 | 3 | 11 | 0 | 0 | 0 | 6 | 0 | 118 | 3 |
| Mansfield Town | 2009–10 | Conference Premier | 16 | 0 | — | | — | | — | | 16 | 0 |
| Stevenage | 2010–11 | League Two | 24 | 1 | 0 | 0 | 0 | 0 | 0 | 0 | 24 | 1 |
| Rotherham United | 2011–12 | League Two | 5 | 0 | 1 | 0 | 0 | 0 | 0 | 0 | 6 | 0 |
| Matlock Town | 2012–13 | NPL Premier Division | 9 | 0 | 1 | 0 | — | | 0 | 0 | 10 | 0 |
| Preston North End | 2012–13 | League One | 6 | 0 | — | | — | | 2 | 1 | 8 | 1 |
| Lincoln City | 2013–14 | Conference Premier | 31 | 1 | 3 | 0 | — | | 3 | 1 | 37 | 2 |
| Southport | 2014–15 | Conference Premier | 35 | 4 | 5 | 0 | — | | 1 | 0 | 41 | 4 |
| Southport | 2015–16 | National League | 29 | 2 | 1 | 0 | — | | 2 | 0 | 32 | 2 |
| Southport | Total | | 64 | 6 | 6 | 0 | 0 | 0 | 3 | 0 | 73 | 6 |
| Harrogate Town | 2015–16 | National League North | 4 | 0 | — | | — | | — | | 4 | 0 |
| Ilkeston Town | 2016–17 | NPL Premier Division | Season statistics not known | | | | | | | | | |
| Coalville Town | 2016–17 | NPL Premier Division | Season statistics not known | | | | | | | | | |
| North Ferriby United | 2017–18 | National League North | 0 | 0 | — | | — | | — | | 0 | 0 |
| Brighouse Town | 2017–18 | NPL Division One North | 1 | 0 | — | | — | | — | | 1 | 0 |
| Goole | 2017–18 | NPL Division One North | 4 | 0 | — | | — | | 1 (Note: Appearance in West Riding County Cup) | 0 | 5 | 0 |
| Barwell | 2017–18 | NPL Premier Division | 2 | 0 | — | | — | | — | | 2 | 0 |
| Loughborough Dynamo | 2018–19 | NPL Division One East | Season statistics not known | | | | | | | | | |
| Loughborough Dynamo | 2019–20 | NPL Division One South East | Season statistics not known | | | | | | | | | |
| Career total | | | 317 | 16 | 26 | 0 | 0 | 0 | 20 | 2 | 363 | 18 |

== Honours ==
Stevenage

- League Two play-offs: 2010–11

Individual

- Oxford United Player of the Year: 2007–08
- Southport Player of the Year: 2014–15
