= James Dudgeon =

Former professional footballer and coach

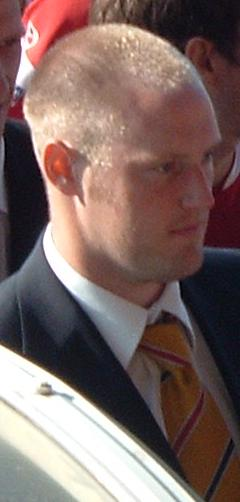
- Dudgeon pictured in 2007

Personal information
- Full name: James Fleming Dudgeon
- Date of birth: 19 March 1981 (age 45)
- Place of birth: Newcastle upon Tyne, England
- Position: Defender

Team information
- Current team: Dodworth Miners Welfare (assistant manager)

Youth career
- –1998: Barnsley

Senior career*
Years	Team	Apps	(Gls)
1998–2003	Barnsley	0	(0)
2000–2001	→ Lincoln City (loan)	22	(3)
2003	Scarborough	1	(0)
2003–2004	Halifax Town	10	(0)
2004–2005	Worksop Town	39	(3)
2005–2007	York City	44	(6)
2007–2008	Stalybridge Celtic	12	(0)
2007–2008	→ Gateshead (loan)	5	(1)
2008	Gainsborough Trinity		
2008	→ Worksop Town (loan)		
2008–2009	Newcastle Blue Star		
2009	Wakefield		
2009–2010	Ilkeston Town		
2009	→ Frickley Athletic (loan)		
2009–2010	→ Goole (loan)		
2010–2012	Goole		

International career
- Scotland youth
- * Club domestic league appearances and goals

James Fleming Dudgeon (born 19 March 1981) is a football coach and former professional footballer who is assistant manager of Dodworth Miners Welfare.

As a player he was a defender who played between 1998 and 2012, most notably in the Football League for Barnsley and Lincoln City but predominantly as a Non-league player for Scarborough, Halifax Town, Worksop Town, York City, Stalybridge Celtic, Gateshead, Gainsborough Trinity, Newcastle Blue Star, Wakefield, Ilkeston Town, Frickley Athletic and Goole.

== Club career ==
Born in Newcastle upon Tyne, Tyne and Wear, England, Dudgeon started his career at Barnsley in their youth system as a trainee before signing a professional contract on 19 July 1999. He signed for Lincoln City on loan on 22 November 2000. Dudgeon was released by Barnsley at the end of the 2002–03 season. He was signed by Scarborough in May 2003 following his release by Barnsley.

He was signed by Halifax Town in September 2003. He was released at the end of the 2003–04 season. He was reported to have signed for Leigh RMI in June 2004, but it was later revealed he had signed for Worksop Town.

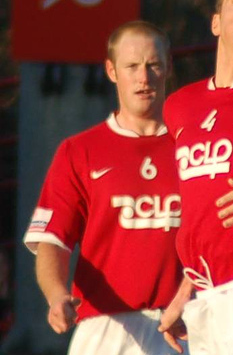
Dudgeon playing for York City in 2007

Dudgeon was signed by York City from Worksop in June 2005. He missed several games in the 2006–07 season because of illness, but has since shrugged this off and was fit for York's game against Oxford United, but was not selected. During York's 1–0 defeat to Woking on 29 December 2006, Dudgeon was sent off as Matt Crossley head-butted him, after he, a York substitute, tried to intervene as a peacemaker during a touchline tussle between Neal Bishop and Woking's Danny Bunce. Dudgeon was given a three match suspension as a result of his red card. In March 2007, he was found guilty of improper conduct, and given the punishment of a £200 fine and a three-game ban, starting on 26 March 2007. He was released by York at the end of the 2006–season on 16 May 2007.

Dudgeon was signed by Stalybridge Celtic on 26 June 2007. On 26 November 2007, he joined Northern Premier League Premier Division side Gateshead on a one-month loan. This loan was extended for another three months in December. However, he joined Gainsborough Trinity of the Conference North on a one-and-a-half-year contract in January 2008. In October, he joined Northern Premier League Premier Division club Worksop Town on a one-month loan, debuting in the 0–0 draw at Kendal Town on 11 October 2008. He joined Newcastle Blue Star in the Northern Premier League Division One North on a one-and-a-half-year contract in November, before suffering a dislocated shoulder just 20 minutes into his debut in the 1–0 home defeat to Curzon Ashton on 15 November 2008. He made his final appearance for the club in the 3–1 home defeat to Trafford on 31 January 2009 before being released and joining Wakefield. He had an unhappy debut for the club, being sent-off for dissent following the award of a late penalty in the 3–2 defeat at Colwyn Bay on 14 February, before scoring his first goal for the club coming in a 2–1 victory at Salford City on 21 February.

He joined Ilkeston Town in June. Having failed to break into Ilkeston's first team he joined Frickley Athletic on loan for a month, debuting in the 2–0 Northern Premier League defeat at Marine on 5 September. He played in Frickley's next match, a 3–1 home victory over Durham City on 8 September, before spending the rest of his loan period as an unused substitute. On 7 October he joined Goole on loan for the remainder of the season, debuting in the 1–1 Northern Premier League Division One South at Leek Town three days later. On 11 January 2010, he departed Ilkeston by mutual consent, joining Goole on a permanent basis as player and assistant manager to his one time Barnsley teammate Karl Rose. In May 2012, Rose was appointed manager at Frickley Athletic with Dudgeon following him to Westfield Lane to act as his assistant.

== International career ==
Despite being born in England, Dudgeon is a Scottish former youth international.

== Coaching career ==
Having previously held positions on the coaching staff at Goole, Wombwell Town and Frickley, Dudgeon joined Dodworth Miners Welfare as assistant manager on 6 September 2021.

== Personal life ==
Dudgeon is a sufferer of post-viral fatigue syndrome, which caused him to miss two seasons for Barnsley. He married Christy Woodhouse in Barnsley during q2 2003.

== Career statistics ==
As of 29 March 2008.

Appearances and goals by club, season and competition
Club	Season	League^{[A]}		FA Cup		League Cup		Other^{[B]}		Total	
Club	Season	Apps	Goals	Apps	Goals	Apps	Goals	Apps	Goals	Apps	Goals
Barnsley	1998–99	0	0	0	0	0	0	0	0	0	0
Barnsley	1999–2000	0	0	0	0	0	0	0	0	0	0
Barnsley	2000–01	0	0	0	0	0	0	0	0	0	0
Barnsley	2001–02	0	0	0	0	0	0	0	0	0	0
Barnsley	2002–03	0	0	0	0	0	0	0	0	0	0
Barnsley	Total	0	0	0	0	0	0	0	0	0	0
Lincoln City (loan)	2000–01	22	3	0	0	0	0	3	0	25	3
Scarborough	2003–04	1	0	0	0	0	0	0	0	1	0
Halifax Town	2003–04	10	0	1	0	0	0	3	0	14	0
Worksop Town	2004–05	39	3	2	0	0	0	2	0	43	3
York City	2005–06	31	6	2	0	0	0	1	0	34	6
York City	2006–07	13	0	0	0	0	0	0	0	13	0
York City	Total	44	6	2	0	0	0	1	0	47	6
Stalybridge Celtic	2007–08	12	0	2	0	0	0	1	0	15	0
Gateshead (loan)	2007–08	5	1	0	0	0	0	3	2	8	3
Gainsborough Trinity	2007–08	9	0	0	0	0	0	0	0	9	0
Career totals		142	13	7	0	0	0	13	2	162	15

== Footnotes ==
A. The "League" column constitutes appearances and goals (including those as a substitute) in the Football League, Football Conference and Northern Premier League.
B. The "Other" column constitutes appearances and goals (including those as a substitute) in the Conference League Cup, Durham Challenge Cup, FA Trophy, Football League Trophy and Northern Premier League Challenge Cup.
