= Ross Greenwood (footballer) =

English footballer

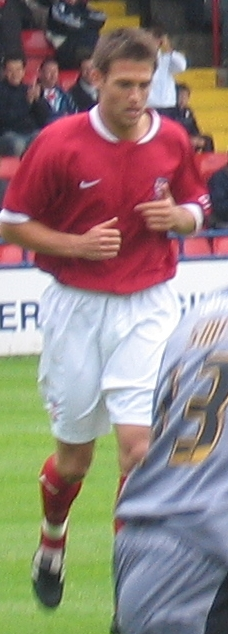
- Greenwood playing for York City in 2007

Personal information
- Full name: Ross Michael Greenwood
- Date of birth: 1 November 1985 (age 40)
- Place of birth: York, England
- Height: 5 ft 11 in (1.80 m)
- Positions: Defender; midfielder

Youth career
- York City
- Manchester United
- –2004: Sheffield Wednesday

Senior career*
Years	Team	Apps	(Gls)
2004–2005	Sheffield Wednesday	2	(0)
2005–2006	Stockport County	22	(0)
2006–2008	York City	19	(0)
2008	→ Gainsborough Trinity (loan)	18	(0)
2008–2009	Gainsborough Trinity	29	(0)
Total		90	(0)
- * Club domestic league appearances and goals

Ross Michael Greenwood (born 1 November 1985) is an English former professional footballer who played as a midfielder.

== Early life ==
Greenwood was born in York and grew up in the village of Copmanthorpe. He attended Copmanthorpe primary school and then went on to Tadcaster Grammar School.

== Career ==
=== Youth ===
Greenwood was playing for Copmanthorpe when he joined York City's Centre of Excellence. He soon joined the under-11s and was coached by City's Colin Sanderson and then progressed into the under-12s, where he was coached by John Stockton and Garry Naylor. He spent two years with York City in total and also played regularly for Copmanthorpe and for York School Boys.

At only 12 years of age, Greenwood was contacted by Nottingham Forest and was asked to join them for a two-week trial period. Greenwood was set to travel to Nottingham, when out of the blue, he received a call from Manchester United urging him to join them instead. Although Greenwood's father is a Leeds United fan and disliked the prospect of his son joining Manchester United, he put all sense of rivalry behind him and recognised his son could not miss out on this opportunity.

=== Manchester United ===
He joined the Manchester United under-13s side as a right-back and occasional centre-back and played in the same team as Chris Eagles and Phil Picken, as well as training with older players such as Kieran Richardson. His coach at the time was Paul McGuinness, the son of former York manager and Manchester United player, Wilf McGuinness and Greenwood would regularly train at Manchester United's Carrington training ground where he would see many of the first team players preparing for Premier League games. Greenwood was not accepted on Manchester United's youth trainee programme and was released by the club. However, soon after Greenwood received offers from 23 clubs including Aston Villa and Blackburn Rovers.

=== Sheffield Wednesday ===
Yorkshire club Sheffield Wednesday was the most persistent and Greenwood felt this was the right move for him. He was signed by academy director, Jimmy Shoulder and the first team manager at the time was Terry Yorath. Greenwood had to wait until Wednesday 22 September 2004 for his first professional start. He played at right-back in a League Cup 1–0 defeat to Coventry City who were a division above Wednesday. Assistant manager Mark Smith singled him out for praise for dealing with opponents who were recently in the Premier League. After this impressive start, Greenwood only made two more substitute appearances before being deemed not good enough by new manager Paul Sturrock.

=== Stockport County ===
He then moved to Stockport County on 15 July 2005 for the 2005–06 season, appearing for the club 25 (22 times in the league), while with the club he played in defence although he is normally a midfield player.

=== York City ===
A move back to Yorkshire and his hometown came 17 July 2006 as he was signed by Conference National side York City. Greenwood was offered a new contract by York at the end of the 2006–07 season on 16 May 2007.

=== Gainsborough Trinity ===
He joined Gainsborough Trinity on loan in January 2008. He was released by York in April 2008, after which he set up a plastering and tiling business with former York teammate Chaz Wrigley whilst playing part-time for Gainsborough.

== Career statistics ==
Appearances and goals by club, season and competition
Club	Season	League			FA Cup		League Cup		Other		Total	
Club	Season	Division	Apps	Goals	Apps	Goals	Apps	Goals	Apps	Goals	Apps	Goals
Sheffield Wednesday	2004–05	League One	2	0	0	0	1	0	1 (Note: Appearance in Football League Trophy)	0	4	0
Stockport County	2005–06	League Two	22	0	2	0	1	0	1	0	26	0
York City	2006–07	Conference National	12	0	1	0	—		1 (Note: Appearance in FA Trophy)	0	14	0
York City	2007–08	Conference National	7	0	0	0	—		0	0	7	0
York City	Total		19	0	1	0	—		1	0	21	0
Gainsborough Trinity (loan)	2007–08	Conference North	18	0	—		—		—		18	0
Gainsborough Trinity	2008–09	Conference North	29	0	0	0	—		2 (Note: One appearance in Conference League Cup, one in FA Trophy)	0	31	0
Gainsborough Trinity	Total		47	0	0	0	—		2	0	49	0
Career total			90	0	3	0	2	0	5	0	100	0
