= Liam Needham =

English footballer

Personal information
- Date of birth: 19 October 1985 (age 41)
- Place of birth: Sheffield, England
- Height: 6 ft 1 in (1.85 m)
- Position: Midfielder

Youth career
- 2002–2004: Sheffield Wednesday

Senior career*
Years	Team	Apps	(Gls)
2004–2005	Sheffield Wednesday	0	(0)
2005	Gainsborough Trinity		
2005–2007	Notts County	22	(0)
2007	→ Gainsborough Trinity (loan)		
2007–2009	Gainsborough Trinity		
2009–2011	Guiseley		
2011–2013	FC Halifax Town	26	(0)
2012	→ Bradford Park Avenue (loan)		
2013	Matlock Town		
- * Club domestic league appearances and goals as of 31 October 2008

Liam Needham (born 19 October 1985) is an English footballer who plays as a midfielder. He has played for Sheffield Wednesday, Gainsborough Trinity, Notts County, Guiseley, FC Halifax Town, Bradford Park Avenue and Matlock Town.

== Career ==
=== Sheffield Wednesday ===
He made his professional debut at Hillsborough on 29 September 2004 coming on as a substitute in the 82nd minute in an embarrassing 1–0 defeat in a Football League Trophy match against Chester City. He said of his debut, "I'm disappointed to lose but to make my debut for Sheffield Wednesday is a dream come true." "I've supported them all my life. But the result is the most important thing of the night. I had butterflies in my stomach for a moment. I couldn't believe I was actually going on. It is a big thing for me which I have now reached. I have set my stall out, this is where I want to be - the first team. I've had my debut from the bench, now it's progressing. I want to get a start for the team now." Liam never played for Sheffield Wednesday again and was released from the club later that year.

=== Gainsborough Trinity ===
He then signed for Gainsborough Trinity on a free transfer under manager Paul Mitchell. His time at The Northolme was short and brief before impressive performances landed him a move back to the Football League.

=== Notts County ===
Needham was snapped up and earned a contract with Notts County, where he started twenty two games and played four as a substitute. However, Needham failed to established himself at the club and he was soon to depart the club bound for his former club Gainsborough.

=== Gainsborough Trinity (second spell) ===
After losing his place in the first team at County he was loaned back to former club Gainsborough Trinity and, then later, returned there on a permanent basis in December 2006. Needham was released by The Blues at the end of the 2008–09 season.

=== Guiseley ===
Following his Gainsborough departure Liam signed with Guiseley.

=== FC Halifax Town ===
He left Guiseley to join FC Halifax Town in the Conference North. Having had a poor start to the 2011–12 season, Needham began to flourish after a Man of the Match performance away to Corby Town. Following this game, Needham was considered by many Halifax fans to be the club's best player in the second half of the season. In the 2012–13 season Needham saw his place taken by experienced midfielder Jason Jarrett. Needham was loaned out to Bradford Park Avenue by manager Neil Aspin to give Liam game time. On his return Liam was able to cement a place in the Halifax starting line-up, and he scored his first goal for the club in an FA Trophy game at home to Chelmsford City, in a game where he managed to score a brace. On 19 February 2013 Needham scored his first league goal for the Shaymen with a shot from the edge of the box away to Gloucester City.
