= Steve Bowey =

English footballer (born 1974)

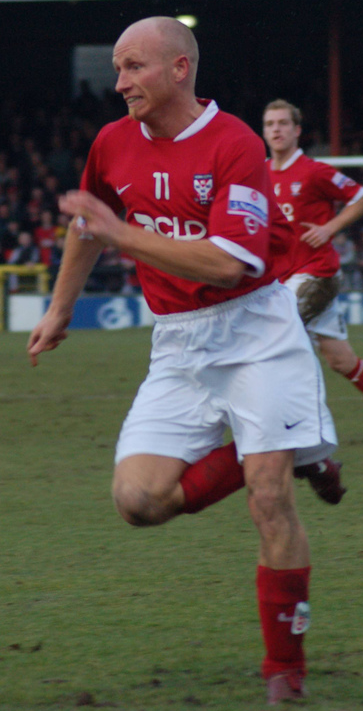
- Bowey playing for York City in 2007

Personal information
- Full name: Steven Bowey
- Date of birth: 10 July 1974 (age 52)
- Place of birth: Durham, England
- Height: 5 ft 8 in (1.73 m)
- Position: Midfielder

Team information
- Current team: Billingham Town (manager)

Senior career*
Years	Team	Apps	(Gls)
1994–1995	Forest Green Rovers		
1995–1997	Bristol Rovers	0	(0)
1997–2002	Gateshead		
2002–2006	Queen of the South	137	(16)
2006–2007	York City	42	(7)
2007–2008	Gateshead	37	(9)
2008–2009	Newcastle Blue Star		
2009–2010	Bedlington Terriers		
2010	Ayr United	18	(1)
2010–2011	Harrogate Town	19	(1)
2011–2014	Newcastle Benfield		
2014–2015	Newcastle Benfield		
2015–2017	Dunston UTS	34	(1)

Managerial career
- 2008–2009: Newcastle Blue Star (player-manager)
- 2012–2014: Newcastle Benfield
- 2014–2015: Newcastle Benfield
- 2017–2019: Ashington
- 2022–2023: Chester-le-Street Town
- 2023–: Billingham Town
- * Club domestic league appearances and goals as of 9 June 2010

Steven Bowey (born 10 July 1974) is an English former professional footballer who played in the Scottish League for Queen of the South and Ayr United. He is currently manager of Billingham Town.

== Career ==
Born in Ouston Durham, County Durham, Bowey started his career at Forest Green Rovers. He was in the British Army for four years before being signed by Bristol Rovers, before moving on to Gateshead where he played approximately 200 times. After a significant spell at Gateshead, Bowey joined Scottish side Queen of the South. His tenacious midfield play and consistently high form quickly made him into a fans' favourite playing alongside Jim Thomson, Andy Aitken, John O'Neill, Sean O'Connor and Peter Weatherson.

Bowey signed for Conference National team York City from Queen of the South on 25 June 2006, becoming the first player aged 30 or over to join the club in 16 months under Billy McEwan. He scored his first goal for York against Stevenage Borough on 15 August 2006 in a 2–1 victory, which turned out to be the winning goal. He was released by York at the end of the 2006–07 season on 16 May 2007.

Bowey rejoined Gateshead on 17 May 2007 following his release by York. After captaining Gateshead to promotion from the Northern Premier League Premier Division via the play-offs, he failed to agree terms for the following season and was released. He joined Newcastle Blue Star for the 2008–09 season in May 2008. He was appointed as the club's player-manager in August after player-coaches Dean Gordon and Mark Birch left the club. In February 2010, Bowey joined Scottish First Division side Ayr United from Bedlington Terriers to help their relegation battle.

In May 2010 he signed for Conference North side Harrogate Town. Bowey's debut against Corby Town saw him substituted at half time with a leg injury that would keep him out of action for 10 matches. On his return he was handed the captain's armband from Martin Foster. Bowey's first goal for Harrogate Town came on 30 October 2010 against Redditch United.

On 13 May 2011, Bowey was released from Harrogate Town after his contract was not renewed for the new season. He joined Newcastle Benfield, becoming player/manager in October 2012. Although he left to become a coach at Consett in May 2014, he returned to the post of Newcastle Benfield Manager in October the same year. In 2015 he left and became player/assistant manager at Dunston UTS, a post he held until July 2017. In October 2017 he was appointed manager of Ashington. He left the club in January 2019.
