= Guylain Ndumbu-Nsungu =

Congolese footballer (born 1982)

Personal information
- Full name: Guylain Ndumbu-Nsungu
- Date of birth: 26 December 1982 (age 43)
- Place of birth: Kinshasa, Zaire
- Position: Striker

Senior career*
Years	Team	Apps	(Gls)
2001–2003	Amiens SC	13	(1)
2003–2005	Sheffield Wednesday	35	(10)
2004	→ Preston North End (loan)	6	(0)
2005	Colchester United	8	(1)
2005–2006	Darlington	21	(10)
2006	Cardiff City	11	(0)
2006–2008	Gillingham	32	(3)
2007	→ Bradford City (loan)	18	(6)
2008	Darlington	8	(3)
Total		152	(34)
- * Club domestic league appearances and goals

Guylain Ndumbu-Nsungu (born 26 December 1982) is a Congolese professional footballer, formerly an under-21 international.

He has played for Amiens SC, Sheffield Wednesday, Preston North End, Colchester United, Cardiff City, Gillingham, Bradford City and had two spells at Darlington.

== Career ==
Ndumbu-Nsungu started his career in France with Division 2 side Amiens SC. He made his professional debut on 15 September 2001, coming on as a late substitute for Fahid Ben Khalfallah in the 1–1 draw away at Le Mans. He went on to make a further six appearances during the 2001–02 season, all of them as a substitute, but spent the majority of the campaign in the reserve team. On 17 August 2012, Ndumbu-Nsungu was given his first start for Amiens and scored the winning goal in the 1–0 win against Saint-Étienne, before being replaced by Léandre Griffit later in the game. He was selected to start in the following two matches, but did not score and subsequently returned to the reserves for several months before returning to the senior side towards the end of the 2002–03 campaign. He made his thirteenth and final appearance for Amiens on 12 April 2003, playing the first 50 minutes of the 0–0 draw against Gueugnon before being substituted.

In August 2003 he joined Sheffield Wednesday, initially on loan before signing permanently four months later for a fee of £50,000. In 35 league appearances, 11 as a substitute, he scored 10 goals, making him the club's top goalscorer in the 2003–04 season. This form attracted the attention of West Ham United manager Alan Pardew and it was reported in The Sun that he was ready to make a £1 million bid, but it never materialised. He won the club's player of the season award, but failed to find favour with the new manager Paul Sturrock and spent time on a short loan with Championship side Preston North End before being released.

After a spell at Colchester United where he scored once against AFC Bournemouth, he joined Darlington at the start of the 2005–06 season, where he scored 10 goals in 21 league appearances. He moved to Cardiff City in January 2006, where he made 11 appearances including seven as substitute. He was released at the end of the season and signed by Gillingham. He scored his first goal for Gillingham away to Blackpool on 26 August 2006 in a game which ended 1–1. He struggled to hold down a place in the team during his first season at the club and was sent on loan to Bradford City the next season. He made his debut on 10 August 2007 and scored an equaliser to secure a 1–1 draw against Macclesfield Town. He played 18 league games, scoring six league goals for Bradford but his loan was not extended when it expired at the end of 2007 partly because of financial reasons. He returned to Gillingham but was immediately placed on the transfer list, and on 29 January 2008 he moved on a free transfer for a second spell at Darlington. Injury delayed his debut back at Darlington, which came on 23 February 2008 against Bury when he scored a sixth-minute penalty in a 2–1 victory. He played eight league games for Darlington, scoring three goals, and was a substitute in both legs of the play-off semi-finals against Rochdale, but after Darlington's defeat on penalties to Rochdale, he was released by manager Dave Penney. On 11 November 2010, Ndumbu-Nsungu was reported as training with Conference National side Tamworth with a view to signing. He trained with Beaconsfield SYCOB in December 2010, though the signing failed to materialise due to problems with international clearance.
