= 2017–18 Sheffield United F.C. season =

Sheffield United
2017–18 season
- Chairman: Kevin McCabe
- Manager: Chris Wilder
- Stadium: Bramall Lane
- Championship: 10th
- FA Cup: Fifth round (eliminated by Leicester City)
- EFL Cup: Second round (eliminated by Leicester City)
- Top goalscorer: League: Leon Clarke (19); All: Leon Clarke (19)
Home colours	Away colours

The 2017–18 season was Sheffield United's 129th season in their history and marked their return to the Championship, following a six-year stay in the third tier. Along with the Championship, the club also competed in the FA Cup and EFL Cup.

Before the season, many EFL fans, Sheffield Wednesday fans amongst them, tipped the Blades for a season of struggles in and around the bottom 3. United defied this by finishing 10th, and chasing the play-offs all season long.

The season covered the period from 1 July 2017 to 30 June 2018.

== Squad ==
No.	Name	Pos.	Nat.	Place of Birth	Age	Apps	Goals	Signed from	Date signed	Fee	Contract End
Goalkeepers
1	Simon Moore	GK	(England)	Sandown	27	55	0	(Wales) Cardiff City	19 August 2016	Undisclosed	2019
27	Jamal Blackman	GK	(England)	Croydon	23	24	0	Chelsea	27 July 2017	Loan	2018
31	Jake Eastwood	GK	(England)	Sheffield	20	3	0	Youth Academy	1 July 2015	Trainee	2018
Defenders
2	George Baldock	RB	(England)	Buckingham	33	24	1	Milton Keynes Dons	1 July 2017	Undisclosed	2020
3	Enda Stevens	LB	(Republic of Ireland)	Dublin	36	33	1	Portsmouth	1 July 2017	Free	2020
5	Jack O'Connell	CB	(England)	Liverpool	23	81	6	Brentford	8 July 2016	Undisclosed	2022
13	Jake Wright	CB	(England)	Keighley	31	49	0	Oxford United	9 July 2016	Free	2019
18	Kieron Freeman	RB	(Wales) (England)	Arnold	25	108	13	Derby County	23 January 2015	Free	2020
19	Richard Stearman	CB	(England)	Wolverhampton	39	17	1	Fulham	6 July 2017	Undisclosed	2020
23	Ben Heneghan	CB	(England)	Manchester	33	1	0	Motherwell	31 August 2017	Undisclosed	2020
24	Daniel Lafferty	LB	(Northern Ireland)	Derry	28	45	4	Burnley	13 January 2017	Undisclosed	2019
Midfielders
4	John Fleck	CM	(Scotland)	Glasgow	25	79	6	Coventry City	11 July 2016	Free	2021
6	Chris Basham	DM/CB	(England)	Hebburn	28	172	8	Blackpool	1 July 2014	Free	2019
7	John Lundstram	CM	(England)	Liverpool	32	29	2	Oxford United	25 July 2017	Undisclosed	2020
14	Ryan Leonard	CM/CB	(England)	Plympton	34	3	0	Southend United	9 January 2018	Undisclosed	2021
15	Paul Coutts	CM	(Scotland)	Aberdeen	28	120	5	Derby County	23 January 2015	Undisclosed	2019
20	Lee Evans	CM	(Wales)	Newport	32	5	0	Wolverhampton Wanderers	10 January 2018	£750,000	2021
21	Mark Duffy	RM	(England)	Liverpool	31	73	8	Birmingham City	1 July 2016	Free	2018
26	Ricky Holmes	LM	(England)	Rochford	39	2	0	Charlton Athletic	Undisclosed	2020	
36	David Brooks	LW/AM	(Wales) (England)	Warrington	29	26	3	Youth Academy	1 July 2015	Trainee	2021
44	Samir Carruthers	CM	(Republic of Ireland) (England)	Islington	24	28	1	Milton Keynes Dons	3 January 2017	Undisclosed	2020
Forwards
9	Leon Clarke	CF	(England)	Birmingham	32	53	24	Bury	27 July 2016	Undisclosed	2019
10	Billy Sharp	CF	(England)	Sheffield	31	223	75	Leeds United	25 July 2015	Undisclosed	2019
11	Clayton Donaldson	CF	(Jamaica)	Bradford	42	18	5	Birmingham City	31 August 2017	Nominal	2018
12	James Wilson	CF	(England)	Biddulph	30	4	1	Manchester United	10 January 2018	Loan	2018
22	Caolan Lavery	CF	(Northern Ireland) (Canada)	Red Deer	24	36	5	Sheffield Wednesday	30 August 2016	Free	2019
32	Ched Evans	CF	(Wales)	Rhyl	37	123	48	Chesterfield	1 July 2017	Undisclosed	2020
Out on Loan
8	Nathan Thomas	LW	(England)	Ingleby Barwick	22	3	2	Hartlepool United	1 July 2017	Undisclosed	2020
17	James Hanson	CF	(England)	Bradford	29	14	1	Bradford City	24 January 2017	Undisclosed	2020
	George Long	GK	(England)	Sheffield	23	123	0	Youth Academy	1 July 2011	Trainee	2018
	Chris Hussey	LB	(England)	London	28	11	0	Bury	1 July 2016	Undisclosed	Undisclosed
	James Wilson	CB	(Wales)	Chepstow	28	10	1	Oldham Athletic	5 July 2016	Free	2018
	Louis Reed	CM	(England)	Barnsley	19	59	0	Youth Academy	1 July 2013	Trainee	2018

- All appearances and goals up to date as of 10 February 2018.

=== Statistics ===
As of 6 May 2018

No.	Pos	Nat	Player	Total		Championship		League Cup		FA Cup	
No.	Pos	Nat	Player	Apps	Goals	Apps	Goals	Apps	Goals	Apps	Goals
1	GK	(England) ENG	Simon Moore	19	0	15+3	0	0+0	0	1+0	0
2	DF	(England) ENG	George Baldock	38	1	30+4	1	1+0	0	3+0	0
3	DF	(Republic of Ireland) IRL	Enda Stevens	47	1	45+0	1	0+0	0	1+1	0
4	MF	(Scotland) SCO	John Fleck	43	2	40+0	2	0+1	0	1+1	0
5	DF	(England) ENG	Jack O'Connell	48	0	46+0	0	1+0	0	1+0	0
6	DF	(England) ENG	Chris Basham	51	2	45+1	2	0+2	0	2+1	0
7	MF	(England) ENG	John Lundstram	39	3	20+15	3	2+0	0	2+0	0
9	FW	(England) ENG	Leon Clarke	39	19	38+1	19	0+0	0	0+0	0
10	FW	(England) ENG	Billy Sharp	37	14	28+6	13	0+1	0	2+0	1
11	FW	(Jamaica) JAM	Clayton Donaldson	29	5	9+17	5	0+0	0	2+1	0
12	FW	(England) ENG	James Wilson	9	1	4+4	1	0+0	0	1+0	0
13	DF	(England) ENG	Jake Wright	22	0	13+4	0	2+0	0	3+0	0
14	MF	(England) ENG	Ryan Leonard	13	0	6+7	0	0+0	0	0+0	0
15	MF	(Scotland) SCO	Paul Coutts	17	1	16+0	1	0+1	0	0+0	0
18	DF	(Wales) WAL	Kieron Freeman	11	1	10+0	1	1+0	0	0+0	0
19	DF	(England) ENG	Richard Stearman	30	2	28+0	2	0+0	0	2+0	0
20	MF	(Wales) WAL	Lee Evans	19	2	18+1	2	0+0	0	0+0	0
21	MF	(England) ENG	Mark Duffy	39	3	28+8	3	1+0	0	1+1	0
23	DF	(England) ENG	Ben Heneghan	1	0	0+0	0	0+0	0	1+0	0
24	DF	(Northern Ireland) NIR	Daniel Lafferty	13	1	1+7	0	2+0	1	3+0	0
26	MF	(England) ENG	Ricky Holmes	5	0	1+4	0	0+0	0	0+0	0
27	GK	(England) ENG	Jamal Blackman	33	0	31+0	0	0+0	0	2+0	0
31	GK	(England) ENG	Jake Eastwood	3	0	0+1	0	2+0	0	0+0	0
32	FW	(Wales) WAL	Ched Evans	13	0	2+7	0	1+1	0	0+2	0
33	DF	(England) ENG	Jake Bennett	1	0	0+0	0	1+0	0	0+0	0
34	MF	(England) ENG	Regan Slater	3	0	0+2	0	0+0	0	0+1	0
36	MF	(Wales) WAL	David Brooks	33	3	9+21	3	2+0	0	0+1	0
44	MF	(Republic of Ireland) IRL	Samir Carruthers	16	1	4+9	1	1+0	0	2+0	0
Player(s) out on loan:
8	MF	(England) ENG	Nathan Thomas	3	2	0+1	0	1+0	1	1+0	1
17	FW	(England) ENG	James Hanson	2	0	0+1	0	1+0	0	0+0	0
22	FW	(Northern Ireland) NIR	Caolan Lavery	6	1	1+2	0	2+0	1	1+0	0
Player(s) who left the club:
16	DF	(United States) USA	Cameron Carter-Vickers	18	1	17+0	1	0+0	0	1+0	0
30	DF	(England) ENG	John Brayford	1	0	0+0	0	1+0	0	0+0	0

==== Goals ====
As of 6 May 2018

Rank	No.	Nat.	Po.	Name	Championship	League Cup	FA Cup	Total
1	9	(England)	CF	Leon Clarke	19	0	0	19
2	10	(England)	CF	Billy Sharp	13	0	1	14
3	11	(Jamaica)	CF	Clayton Donaldson	5	0	0	5
4	7	(England)	CM	John Lundstram	3	0	0	3
4	21	(England)	AM	Mark Duffy	3	0	0	3
4	36	(Wales)	AM	David Brooks	3	0	0	3
7	4	(Scotland)	CM	John Fleck	2	0	0	2
7	6	(England)	DM	Chris Basham	2	0	0	2
7	8	(England)	LW	Nathan Thomas	0	1	1	2
7	19	(England)	CB	Richard Stearman	2	0	0	2
7	20	(Wales)	CM	Lee Evans	2	0	0	2
12	2	(England)	RB	George Baldock	1	0	0	1
12	3	(Republic of Ireland)	LB	Enda Stevens	1	0	0	1
12	12	(England)	CF	James Wilson	1	0	0	1
12	15	(Scotland)	CM	Paul Coutts	1	0	0	1
12	18	(Wales)	RB	Kieron Freeman	1	0	0	1
12	22	(Northern Ireland)	CF	Caolan Lavery	0	1	0	1
12	24	(Northern Ireland)	LB	Daniel Lafferty	0	1	0	1
12	44	(England)	CM	Samir Carruthers	1	0	0	1
12		(United States)	CB	Cameron Carter-Vickers	1	0	0	1
Total					61	3	2	66

==== Disciplinary record ====
As of 6 May 2018

Rank	No.	Nat.	Po.	Name	Championship			League Cup			FA Cup			Total		
Rank	No.	Nat.	Po.	Name	Booked	(yellow card) (yellow-red card)	Sent off (straight red)	Booked	(yellow card) (yellow-red card)	Sent off (straight red)	Booked	(yellow card) (yellow-red card)	Sent off (straight red)	Booked	(yellow card) (yellow-red card)	Sent off (straight red)
1	4	(Scotland)	CM	John Fleck	14	0	1	0	0	0	0	0	0	14	0	1
2	3	(Republic of Ireland)	LB	Enda Stevens	10	0	0	0	0	0	0	0	0	10	0	0
3	6	(England)	DM	Chris Basham	8	0	0	0	0	0	1	0	0	9	0	0
4	5	(England)	CB	Jack O'Connell	6	0	0	0	0	0	0	0	0	6	0	0
4	15	(Scotland)	CM	Paul Coutts	6	0	0	0	0	0	0	0	0	6	0	0
4	20	(Wales)	CM	Lee Evans	6	0	0	0	0	0	0	0	0	6	0	0
7	7	(England)	CM	John Lundstram	3	0	0	1	0	0	1	0	0	5	0	0
7	9	(England)	CF	Leon Clarke	4	0	1	0	0	0	0	0	0	4	0	1
7	36	(Wales)	AM	David Brooks	5	0	0	0	0	0	0	0	0	5	0	0
11	2	(England)	RB	George Baldock	4	0	0	0	0	0	0	0	0	4	0	0
11	10	(England)	CF	Billy Sharp	4	0	0	0	0	0	0	0	0	4	0	0
11	19	(England)	CB	Richard Stearman	4	0	0	0	0	0	0	0	0	4	0	0
14	21	(England)	AM	Mark Duffy	3	0	0	0	0	0	0	0	0	3	0	0
15	11	(Jamaica)	CF	Clayton Donaldson	2	0	0	0	0	0	0	0	0	2	0	0
15	24	(Northern Ireland)	LB	Daniel Lafferty	0	0	0	1	0	0	1	0	0	2	0	0
15	27	(England)	GK	Jamal Blackman	1	0	1	0	0	0	0	0	0	1	0	1
15		(United States)	CB	Cameron Carter-Vickers	1	0	0	0	0	0	1	0	0	2	0	0
19	1	(England)	GK	Simon Moore	0	0	1	0	0	0	0	0	0	0	0	1
19	12	(England)	CF	James Wilson	1	0	0	0	0	0	0	0	0	1	0	0
19	13	(England)	CB	Jake Wright	0	0	0	0	0	0	1	0	0	1	0	0
Total					78	0	3	2	0	0	5	0	0	85	0	3

=== Contracts ===
Date	Position	Nationality	Name	Status	Contract Length	Expiry Date	Ref.
18 July 2017	CM	(England)	Chris Basham	Signed	2 years	June 2019	
18 July 2017	CM	(Scotland)	Paul Coutts	Signed	2 years	June 2019	
18 July 2017	RB	(Wales)	Kieron Freeman	Signed	3 years	June 2020	
18 July 2017	CF	(England)	Billy Sharp	Signed	2 years	June 2019	
22 September 2017	CM	(Scotland)	John Fleck	Signed	4 years	June 2021	
15 November 2017	CB	(England)	Jack O'Connell	Signed	4.5 years	June 2022	

== Transfers ==
=== Transfers in ===
Date	Position	Nationality	Name	From	Fee	Ref.
1 July 2017	RB	(England)	George Baldock	(England) Milton Keynes Dons	Undisclosed	
1 July 2017	CF	(Wales)	Ched Evans	(England) Chesterfield	Undisclosed	
1 July 2017	LB	(Republic of Ireland)	Enda Stevens	(England) Portsmouth	Free	
1 July 2017	LW	(England)	Nathan Thomas	(England) Hartlepool United	Undisclosed	
6 July 2017	CB	(England)	Richard Stearman	(England) Fulham	Undisclosed	
25 July 2017	CM	(England)	John Lundstram	(England) Oxford United	Undisclosed	
31 August 2017	CF	(Jamaica)	Clayton Donaldson	(England) Birmingham City	Undisclosed	
31 August 2017	CB	(England)	Ben Heneghan	(Scotland) Motherwell	Undisclosed	
9 January 2018	CM	(England)	Ryan Leonard	(England) Southend United	Undisclosed	
10 January 2018	CM	(Wales)	Lee Evans	(England) Wolverhampton Wanderers	£750,000	
15 January 2018	LM	(England)	Ricky Holmes	(England) Charlton Athletic	Undisclosed	

=== Transfers out ===
Date	Position	Nationality	Name	To	Fee	Ref.
1 July 2017	LB	(Republic of Ireland)	Graham Kelly	(England) Port Vale	Free	
1 July 2017	CF	(Scotland)	Marc McNulty	(England) Coventry City	Free	(Note: Marc McNulty joined Coventry City following release from the club.)
1 July 2017	AM	(Republic of Ireland)	Jay O'Shea	(England) Bury	Free	(Note: Jay O'Shea joined Bury on a free transfer after rejecting a contract with Sheffield United.)
1 July 2017	AM	(Scotland)	Stefan Scougall	(Scotland) St Johnstone	Free	(Note: Stefan Scougall joined St Johnstone following release from the club.)
3 August 2017	LM	(England)	Matt Done	(England) Rochdale	Mutual consent	(Note: Matt Done joined Rochdale following his departure.)
16 August 2017	LB	(England)	Kieran Wallace	Free agent	Mutual consent	
31 August 2017	RB	(England)	John Brayford	(England) Burton Albion	Mutual consent	(Note: John Brayford joined Burton Albion following his departure.)
11 January 2018	CM	(England)	Ben Whiteman	(England) Doncaster Rovers	Undisclosed	

=== Loans in ===
Start date	Position	Nationality	Name	From	End date	Ref.
27 July 2017	GK	(England)	Jamal Blackman	(England) Chelsea	30 June 2018	
25 August 2017	CB	(United States)	Cameron Carter-Vickers	(England) Tottenham Hotspur	30 June 2018	
10 January 2018	CF	(England)	James Wilson	(England) Manchester United	30 June 2018	

=== Loans out ===
Start date	Position	Nationality	Name	To	End date	Ref.
1 July 2017	AM	(England)	Benjamin Whiteman	(England) Doncaster Rovers	January 2018	
4 July 2017	GK	(England)	George Long	(England) AFC Wimbledon	30 June 2018	
7 July 2017	LB	(England)	Chris Hussey	(England) Swindon Town	30 June 2018	
11 July 2017	CM	(England)	Louis Reed	(England) Chesterfield	30 June 2018	
17 July 2017	CB	(Wales)	James Wilson	(England) Walsall	30 June 2018	
26 October 2017	FW	(England)	Jordan Hallam	(England) Southport	23 November 2017	
3 January 2018	CF	(England)	James Hanson	(England) Bury	30 June 2018	

== Pre-season ==
=== Friendlies ===
As of 16 June 2017, Sheffield United have six pre-season friendlies against Stoke City, Stocksbridge Park Steels, Chesterfield, Rotherham United, Eastleigh and Málaga.

8 July 2017	Stocksbridge Park Steels	0–9	Sheffield United	Stocksbridge
15:00 BST		Report	Sharp 21'; Clarke 25', 27'; Lavery 57', 72', 82' (pen.); Brooks 85', 89'; Stevens 88'	Stadium: Bracken Moor; Attendance: 1,824

14 July 2017	(Spain) Málaga	0–1	Sheffield United	Coín, Spain
20:30 CEST		Report	Fleck 25'	Stadium: Estadio José Burgos Quintana

18 July 2017	Chesterfield	1–2	Sheffield United	Chesterfield
19:30 BST	O'Grady 31'	Report	O'Connell 72'; Brooks 85'	Stadium: Proact Stadium

21 July 2017	Rotherham United	1–2	Sheffield United	Rotherham
19:45 BST	Yates 86'	Report	Ihiekwe 68' (o.g.); Stevens 80'	Stadium: AESSEAL New York Stadium; Attendance: 7,396

25 July 2017	Sheffield United	2–1	Stoke City	Sheffield
19:45 BST	Sharp 10'; Brooks 90'	Report	Shaqiri 35'	Stadium: Bramall Lane

28 July 2017	Eastleigh	2–3	Sheffield United	Eastleigh
19:45 BST				Stadium: Ten Acres; Referee: Graham Horwood

== Competitions ==
=== EFL Championship ===
==== League table ====
Pos	Team	Pld	W	D	L	GF	GA	GD	Pts
8	Millwall	46	19	15	12	56	45	+11	72
9	Brentford	46	18	15	13	62	52	+10	69
10	Sheffield United	46	20	9	17	62	55	+7	69
11	Bristol City	46	17	16	13	67	58	+9	67
12	Ipswich Town	46	17	9	20	57	60	−3	60

Source: English Football League
Rules for classification: 1) Points; 2) Goal difference; 3) Number of goals scored

==== Result summary ====
Overall								Home						Away					
Pld	W	D	L	GF	GA	GD	Pts	W	D	L	GF	GA	GD	W	D	L	GF	GA	GD
44	19	9	16	59	52	+7	66	12	5	5	33	19	+14	7	4	11	26	33	−7

Last updated: 28 April 2018.

==== Results by matchday ====
Matchday	1	2	3	4	5	6	7	8	9	10	11	12	13	14	15	16	17	18	19	20	21	22	23	24	25	26	27	28	29	30	31	32	33	34	35	36	37	38	39	40	41	42	43	44	45	46
Ground	H	A	A	H	H	A	A	H	A	H	A	H	H	A	A	H	A	H	H	A	H	A	A	H	H	A	H	A	H	A	H	H	A	A	A	A	H	H	A	H	A	H	H	A	H	A
Result	W	L	L	W	W	W	W	L	W	W	L	W	W	W	L	W	W	L	D	L	L	L	D	W	L	D	D	W	L	L	W	W	L	W	L	D	W	D	D	D	L	W	D	L	L	W
Position	8	12	17	10	5	5	3	6	4	2	3	3	3	1	3	2	2	3	3	4	4	6	7	6	6	7	6	6	7	8	8	7	7	6	9	9	7	9	9	9	9	9	9	11	11	10

Updated to match(es) played on 6 May 2018. Source: Statto.com
A = Away; H = Home; W = Win; D = Draw; L = Loss

==== Matches ====
On 21 June 2017, the EFL Championship league fixtures were announced.

5 August 2017 1	Sheffield United	1–0	Brentford	Sheffield
15:00 BST	Sharp 39'	Report		Stadium: Bramall Lane; Attendance: 26,746; Referee: Stephen Martin

12 August 2017 2	Middlesbrough	1–0	Sheffield United	Middlesbrough
17:30 BST	Gestede 20'; Friend (yellow card) 70'	Report	Stevens (yellow card) 63'	Stadium: Riverside Stadium; Attendance: 26,876; Referee: Peter Bankes

15 August 2017 3	Cardiff City	2–0	Sheffield United	Leckwith
19:45 BST	Mendez-Laing (yellow card) 20', (goal) 55'; Bamba (yellow card) 23'; Morrison 44'	Report	(yellow card) 21' Basham	Stadium: Cardiff City Stadium; Attendance: 17,844; Referee: Lee Mason

19 August 2017 4	Sheffield United	1–0	Barnsley	Sheffield
12:15 BST	Sharp 17' (yellow card) 21'; Clarke (red card) 42'; Fleck (yellow card) 58'; Stevens (yellow card) 84'	Report	McCarthy (yellow card) 31'; MacDonald (red card) 42'; Hammill (yellow card) 45+2'; Pearson (yellow card) 48'	Stadium: Bramall Lane; Attendance: 25,482; Referee: Tim Robinson

26 August 2017 5	Sheffield United	3–1	Derby County	Sheffield
15:00 BST	Sharp 4', 90+7' (yellow card) 89'; O'Connell (yellow card) 32'; Russell 39' (o.g.); Blackman (yellow card) 90+6'	Report	Lawrence (yellow card) 59'; Johnson (yellow card) 71'; Keogh (yellow card) 89'; Bryson 90+1'	Stadium: Bramall Lane; Attendance: 26,202; Referee: Andy Madley

9 September 2017 6	Sunderland	1–2	Sheffield United	Sunderland
15:00 BST	Wilson (yellow card) 41'; Rodwell 90+4'	Report	Donaldson 21', 77'; Coutts (yellow card) 48'; Lundstram (yellow card) 90+4'	Stadium: Stadium of Light; Attendance: 29,579; Referee: Jeremy Simpson

12 September 2017 7	Bolton Wanderers	0–1	Sheffield United	Horwich
19:30 BST	Morais (yellow card) 41'; Cullen (yellow card) 52'; Madine (yellow card) 88'	Report	Carter-Vickers 33'; Lafferty (yellow card) 82'	Stadium: Macron Stadium; Attendance: 14,346; Referee: Stuart Attwell

16 September 2017 8	Sheffield United	0–1	Norwich City	Sheffield
15:00 BST	Coutts (yellow card) 63'; Fleck (yellow card) 65'	Report	Wildschut 23'; Tettey (yellow card) 59'; Husband (yellow card) 78'; Jerome (yellow card) 82'; Maddison (yellow card) 86'; Trybull (yellow card) 89'	Stadium: Bramall Lane; Attendance: 26,218; Referee: Scott Duncan

24 September 2017 9	Sheffield Wednesday	2–4	Sheffield United	Owlerton
13:15 BST	Bannan (yellow card) 12'; Hooper 45+1'; João 66'	Report	Fleck 3' (yellow card) 90'; Clarke 15', 77'; Duffy 67'; Basham (yellow card) 75'	Stadium: Hillsborough Stadium; Attendance: 32,839; Referee: Simon Hooper

27 September 2017 10	Sheffield United	2–0	Wolverhampton Wanderers	Sheffield
19:45 BST	Clarke 39', 58'; Coutts (yellow card) 54'; Basham (yellow card) 67'; Baldock (yellow card) 75'	Report	Coady (red card) 15'; Neves (penalty missed) (yellow card) 72'	Stadium: Bramall Lane; Attendance: 25,893; Referee: Peter Bankes

30 September 2017 11	Nottingham Forest	2–1	Sheffield United	Nottingham
15:00 BST	Cummings 9'; Dowell 27'; Bouchalakis (yellow card) 83'; Osborn (yellow card) 84'; Bridcutt (yellow card) 88'	Report	Lundstram 3', (yellow card) 21'; Coutts (yellow card) 44'; Duffy (yellow card) 90+3'; Stevens (yellow card) 90+4'	Stadium: City Ground; Attendance: 25,700; Referee: Andy Davies

14 October 2017 12	Sheffield United	1–0	Ipswich Town	Sheffield
15:00 BST	Clarke (yellow card) 33'; Basham 49'; Carter-Vickers (yellow card) 90+2'	Report	Knudsen (yellow card) 69'	Stadium: Bramall Lane; Attendance: 25,799; Referee: Tony Harrington

21 October 2017 13	Sheffield United	2–1	Reading	Sheffield
15:00 BST	Coutts 19'; Sharp 37'; Brooks (yellow card) 90+3'	Report	van den Berg (yellow card) 56'; McShane (yellow card) 57'; Beerens 85'	Stadium: Bramall Lane; Attendance: 26,265; Referee: David Coote

27 October 2017 14	Leeds United	1–2	Sheffield United	Leeds
19:45 BST	Phillips 34' (yellow card) 62'; Ronaldo Vieira (yellow card) 87'	Report	Sharp 2'; Stevens (yellow card) 45'; Coutts (yellow card) 51'; O'Connell (yellow card) 60'; Baldock (yellow card) 74'; Brooks 81'; Clarke (yellow card) 82'; Fleck (yellow card) 84'	Stadium: Elland Road; Attendance: 34,504; Referee: Scott Duncan

31 October 2017 15	Queens Park Rangers	1–0	Sheffield United	Shepherd's Bush
19:45 GMT	Sylla 4'; Cousins (yellow card) 28'; Scowen (yellow card) 90+1'	Report	Clarke (yellow card) 29'; Brooks (yellow card) 90+1'	Stadium: Loftus Road; Attendance: 13,604; Referee: Keith Stroud

4 November 2017 16	Sheffield United	4–1	Hull City	Sheffield
15:00 GMT	Clarke (yellow card) 23' (goal) 53', 76', 80', 88'	Report	Grosicki 29'; Aina (yellow card) 39'; Campbell (yellow card) 42'	Stadium: Bramall Lane; Attendance: 27,466; Referee: Darren Bond

17 November 2017 17	Burton Albion	1–3	Sheffield United	Burton upon Trent
19:45 GMT	Palmer 31'; Warnock (yellow card) 42'	Report	Sharp 10' (pen.), 34'; Clarke 78'	Stadium: Pirelli Stadium; Attendance: 5,167; Referee: Oliver Langford

21 November 2017 18	Sheffield United	4–5	Fulham	Sheffield
19:45 GMT	Clarke 6', 39', 90+1'; Sharp (yellow card) 33'; Lundstram (yellow card) 45+4'; Carruthers 86'; Brooks (yellow card) 90+3'	Report	Ojo 28', 69'; Sessegnon 30', 43', 78'; Fredericks (yellow card) 33'; Ayité (yellow card) 45+2'; Odoi (yellow card) 73'; Kamara (yellow card) 90+6'	Stadium: Bramall Lane; Attendance: 25,445; Referee: James Linington

25 November 2017 19	Sheffield United	1–1	Birmingham City	Sheffield
17:30 GMT	Clarke 71'; Fleck (yellow card) 78'	Report	Kieftenbeld (yellow card) 31'; Boga 38'; Jota (yellow card) 54'; Grounds (yellow card) 72'; Ndoye (yellow card) 76'	Stadium: Bramall Lane; Attendance: 27,427; Referee: Jeremy Simpson

2 December 2017 20	Millwall	3–1	Sheffield United	Bermondsey
15:00 GMT	Gregory 14'; Romeo 66'; Cooper 87'	Report	Brooks (yellow card) 10', (goal) 41'	Stadium: The Den; Attendance: 12,669; Referee: Andy Madley

8 December 2017 21	Sheffield United	1–2	Bristol City	Sheffield
19:45 GMT	Stevens (yellow card) 43'; Clarke 48'; Fleck (red card) 59'	Report	Paterson 43', (yellow card) 90+5'; Đurić (yellow card) 55'; Flint 90+1'; Reid (yellow card) 90+3'	Stadium: Bramall Lane; Attendance: 24,409; Referee: David Coote

16 December 2017 22	Preston North End	1–0	Sheffield United	Preston
15:00 GMT	Hugill 58'	Report		Stadium: Deepdale; Attendance: 15,202; Referee: Tim Robinson

23 December 2017 23	Aston Villa	2–2	Sheffield United	Birmingham
17:30 GMT	Adomah 4' (pen.); Jedinak 9'	Report	Donaldson 12', 26'	Stadium: Villa Park; Attendance: 35,210; Referee: Simon Hooper

26 December 2017 24	Sheffield United	3–0	Sunderland	Sheffield
15:00 GMT	Lundstram 36'; Stearman 58'; Baldock 62'	Report		Stadium: Bramall Lane; Attendance: 30,668

30 December 2017 25	Sheffield United	0–1	Bolton Wanderers	Sheffield
15:00 GMT	Fleck (yellow card) 29'; Baldock (yellow card) 45+1'	Report	Madine 21' (yellow card) 52'; Robinson (yellow card) 37'	Stadium: Bramall Lane; Attendance: 28,387; Referee: Stephen Martin

1 January 2018 26	Derby County	1–1	Sheffield United	Derby
15:00 GMT	Vydra 24' (pen.)	Report	Clarke 57'	Stadium: Pride Park Stadium; Attendance: 30,003; Referee: Darren Bond

12 January 2018 27	Sheffield United	0–0	Sheffield Wednesday	Sheffield
19:45 GMT		Report	Loovens (yellow card) 25' (yellow-red card) 64'	Stadium: Bramall Lane; Attendance: 31,120; Referee: David Coote

20 January 2018 28	Norwich City	1–2	Sheffield United	Norwich
15:00 GMT	Pinto 70' (yellow card) 90+3'; Klose (yellow card) 90+1'	Report	Wilson 6'; Fleck (yellow card) 66'; Donaldson 68'; Leon Clarke (yellow card) 87'	Stadium: Carrow Road; Attendance: 26,486; Referee: Tony Harrington

30 January 2018 29	Sheffield United	0–1	Aston Villa	Sheffield
19:45 GMT		Report	Snodgrass 90'	Stadium: Bramall Lane; Referee: Jeremy Simpson

3 February 2018 30	Wolverhampton Wanderers	3–0	Sheffield United	Wolverhampton
17:30 GMT	Neves 5'; Jota 30'; Cavaleiro 76'	Report		Stadium: Molineux; Attendance: 29,311; Referee: Darren Bond

10 February 2018 31	Sheffield United	2–1	Leeds United	Sheffield
12:30 GMT	Sharp 2', (yellow card) 14', (goal) 73' (pen.); Evans (yellow card) 44'; Fleck (yellow card) 90+2'	Report	Forshaw (yellow card) 5'; Roofe (yellow card) 19'; Lasogga 47'	Stadium: Bramall Lane; Attendance: 27,553; Referee: Andrew Madley

20 February 2018 32	Sheffield United	2–1	Queens Park Rangers	Sheffield
19:45 GMT	Stearman 27'; Lundstram 50'; Evans (yellow card) 77'	Report	Freeman 63'	Stadium: Bramall Lane; Attendance: 25,339; Referee: Oliver Langford

23 February 2018 33	Hull City	1–0	Sheffield United	Kingston upon Hull
19:45 GMT	Irvine (yellow card) 16'; Dicko 55'	Report		Stadium: KCOM Stadium; Attendance: 15,213; Referee: Simon Hooper

27 February 2018 34	Reading	1–3	Sheffield United	Reading
20:00 GMT (UTC)	Richards 51' van den Berg (yellow card) 57'; Bacuna (penalty missed) 62'; Mannone (yellow card) 64'; Clement (yellow card) 70'	Report	Sharp 11', 63'; Duffy 44'; Basham (yellow card) 50'; Donaldson (yellow card) 83'	Stadium: Madejski Stadium; Attendance: Andy Davies; Referee: 6,769
Note: Game moved from 17 February, due to Sheffield United's FA Cup fifth-round match against Leicester City

6 March 2018 35	Fulham	3–0	Sheffield United	Fulham
19:45 GMT	Mitrović 31', 44'; Cairney 61'	Report		Stadium: Craven Cottage; Attendance: 18,400; Referee: Keith Stroud

10 March 2018 36	Ipswich Town	0–0	Sheffield United	Ipswich
15:00 GMT	Skuse (yellow card) 40'; Gleeson (yellow card) 84'	Report	Stearman (yellow card) 9'	Stadium: Portman Road; Attendance: 15,152; Referee: John Brooks

13 March 2018 37	Sheffield United	2–0	Burton Albion	Sheffield
	Stevens 29'; L. Evans (yellow card) 57'; Brooks 64'; Stearman (yellow card) 73'	Report	Naylor (yellow card) 72'	Stadium: Bramall Lane; Attendance: 24,832; Referee: Scott Duncan

17 March 2018 38	Sheffield United	0–0	Nottingham Forest	Sheffield
15:00 GMT	Fleck (yellow card) 90'	Report	(yellow card) 44' Fox; (yellow card) 77' Watson; (yellow card) 87' Colback	Stadium: Bramall Lane; Attendance: 28,095; Referee: Paul Tierney

30 March 2018 39	Brentford	1–1	Sheffield United	Brentford
15:00 BST	Mepham 68'; Woods (red card) 69'	Report	Basham (yellow card) 50', (goal) 55'; Stevens (yellow card) 60'; Blackman (red card) 69'	Stadium: Griffin Park; Attendance: 11,174; Referee: Jeremy Simpson

2 April 2018 40	Sheffield United	1–1	Cardiff City	Sheffield
19:45 BST	Clarke 28'	Report	Joe Bennett (yellow card) 29'; Pilkington 90+1'	Stadium: Bramall Lane; Attendance: 25,231; Referee: Michael Oliver
Note: Live On Sky TV

7 April 2018 41	Barnsley	3–2	Sheffield United	Barnsley
12:15 BST	Gardner 25'; McBurnie (yellow card) 34', (goal) 74'; Lindsay (yellow card) 45'; Bradshaw 88'	Report	O'Connell (yellow card) 36'; Brooks (yellow card) 45'; Fleck 57'; Clarke 65'	Stadium: Oakwell; Attendance: 16,041; Referee: Scott Duncan

10 April 2018 42	Sheffield United	2–1	Middlesbrough	Sheffield
	L. Evans 2', 40'; Fleck (yellow card) 35'	Report	Leadbitter (yellow card) 19' (yellow-red card) 25'; Traoré (yellow card) 41'; Ayala 48'; Fábio (yellow card) 71'; Friend (yellow card) 87'	Stadium: Bramall Lane; Attendance: 26,557; Referee: Darren Bond

14 April 2018 43	Sheffield United	1–1	Millwall	Sheffield
13:00 BST	Clarke 74'; Stearman (yellow card) 70'; L. Evans (yellow card) 90'	Report	Williams (yellow card) 45'; Marshall (yellow card) 75'; Morison 76'; Saville (yellow card) 81'	Stadium: Bramall Lane; Attendance: 27,454; Referee: David Coote

21 April 2018 44	Birmingham City	2–1	Sheffield United	Birmingham
15:00 BST	Harding (yellow card) 16'; Roberts 32'; Maghoma 69'	Report	Duffy 7', (yellow card) 7'; O'Connell (yellow card) 63'	Stadium: St Andrew's; Attendance: 23,579; Referee: Tim Robinson

28 April 2018 45	Sheffield United	0–1	Preston North End	Sheffield
15:00 BST	Fleck (yellow card) 44'; L. Evans (yellow card) 52'; Stevens (yellow card) 66'; Sharp (yellow card) 81'	Report	Fisher (yellow card) 28'; Harrop (yellow card) 31'; Browne 57'; Rudd (yellow card) 90+5'	Stadium: Bramall Lane; Attendance: 28,568; Referee: James Linington

6 May 2018 46	Bristol City	2–3	Sheffield United	Bristol
12:30 BST	Flint (yellow card) 17', (goal) 60'; Diédhiou (yellow card) 42'; Bryan (yellow card) 49', (goal) 75'; Pack (yellow card) 90+1'	Report	Clarke 8'; Sharp 29'; Freeman 34'; Stearman (yellow card) 74'; Baldock (yellow card) 89'	Stadium: Ashton Gate Stadium; Attendance: 23,902; Referee: Peter Bankes

=== FA Cup ===
In the FA Cup, Sheffield United entered the competition in the third round and were drawn away to Ipswich Town.

6 January 2018 Third round	Ipswich Town	0–1	Sheffield United	Ipswich
15:00 GMT	Chambers (yellow card) 24'	Report	Thomas 25'; Basham (yellow card) 45+2'; Wright (yellow card) 81'; Carter-Vickers (yellow card) 90+3'	Stadium: Portman Road; Attendance: 12,057; Referee: Mike Jones

27 January 2018 Fourth round	Sheffield United	1–0	Preston North End	Sheffield
	Sharp 80' (pen.)	Report		Stadium: Bramall Lane; Attendance: 15,680; Referee: Graham Scott

16 February 2018 Fifth round	Leicester City	1–0	Sheffield United	Leicester
19:45 GMT	Vardy 66'	Report		Stadium: King Power Stadium; Attendance: 28,336; Referee: Lee Mason

=== EFL Cup ===
On 16 June 2017, Sheffield United were drawn at home to Walsall in the first round. A home tie was to follow in the second round, with Leicester City the visitors.

9 August 2017 First round	Sheffield United	3–2	Walsall	Sheffield
19:45 BST	Roberts 74' (o.g.); Thomas 79'; Lafferty 82'	Report	Bakayoko 13'; Kinsella (yellow card) 56'; Oztumer 90+1' (pen.); Chambers (yellow card) 90+2'	Stadium: Bramall Lane; Attendance: 5,210; Referee: Kevin Friend

22 August 2017 Second round	Sheffield United	1–4	Leicester City	Sheffield
19:45 BST	Lafferty (yellow card) 4'; Lundstram (yellow card) 54'; Lavery 84'	Report	Musa (yellow card) 20' (goal) 90+4'; Slimani (yellow card) 24' (goal) 63', 67'; Gray 52'	Stadium: Bramall Lane; Attendance: 11,280; Referee: Tony Harrington
