= 2018–19 Sheffield United F.C. season =

Sheffield United
2018–19 season
- Chairman: Kevin McCabe
- Manager: Chris Wilder
- Stadium: Bramall Lane
- Championship: 2nd (promoted)
- FA Cup: Third round
- EFL Cup: First round
- Top goalscorer: League: Billy Sharp (23); All: Billy Sharp (24)
- Highest home attendance: League/All: 30,261 (9 Nov 2018 v. Wednesday, League)
- Lowest home attendance: League: 23,400 (14 Dec 2018 v. West Bromwich Albion); All: 6,327 (14 Aug 2018 v. Hull City, EFL Cup)
- Average home league attendance: 26,177
- Biggest win: 4–0 (16 Feb 2019 v. Reading, League)
- Biggest defeat: 0–3 (7 Aug 2018 v. Middlesbrough, League)
Home colours	Away colours

The 2018–19 season was Sheffield United's 130th season in their history and second consecutive in the Championship. Along with the Championship, the club also competed in the FA Cup and EFL Cup. The season covers the period from 1 July 2018 to 30 June 2019. They were promoted to the Premier League during this season, after a long battle with Leeds United. A 2–0 home victory vs Ipswich Town sealed their first promotion to the top flight since 2005-06.

Their season started poorly after they fell to bottom of the league after 2 defeats to Swansea City and Middlesbrough respectively. They bounced back with 4 wins in a row between games 3 and 6. They had mixed form until Christmas, but after the halfway point they suffered just 2 defeats in 23 games. 2 draws to Birmingham City and Millwall late on in the season made it look a hard task for Sheffield United to finish 2nd. However, Leeds United somewhat bottled the season in the late stages and Sheffield United were presented with a chance to seal promotion against Ipswich Town on Matchday 45. They won the game 2–0 and were all but promoted to the Premier League. Their victory was arithmetically confirmed after Leeds United drew 1–1 at home to Aston Villa.

== Squad ==
No.	Name	Pos.	Nat.	Place of Birth	Age	Apps	Goals	Signed from	Date signed	Fee	Contract End
Goalkeepers
1	Dean Henderson	GK	(England)	Whitehaven	29	38	0	Manchester United	1 July 2018	Loan	2019
25	Simon Moore	GK	(England)	Sandown	36	66	0	(Wales) Cardiff City	19 August 2016	Undisclosed	2021
31	Jake Eastwood	GK	(England)	Sheffield	29	3	0	Youth Academy	1 July 2015	Trainee	2019
Defenders
2	George Baldock	RB	(England)	Buckingham	33	51	2	Milton Keynes Dons	1 July 2017	Undisclosed	2020
3	Enda Stevens	LB	(Republic of Ireland)	Dublin	36	75	1	Portsmouth	1 July 2017	Free	2020
5	Jack O'Connell	CB	(England)	Liverpool	32	127	7	Brentford	8 July 2016	Undisclosed	2022
12	John Egan	CB	(Republic of Ireland)	Cork	33	28	1	Brentford	19 July 2018	Undisclosed	2022
13	Jake Wright	CB	(England)	Keighley	40	52	0	Oxford United	9 July 2016	Free	2019
18	Kieron Freeman	RB	(Wales) (England)	Arnold	34	130	16	Derby County	23 January 2015	Free	2020
19	Richard Stearman	CB	(England)	Wolverhampton	39	41	2	Fulham	6 July 2017	Undisclosed	2020
20	Kean Bryan	CB/LB	(England)	Manchester	29	1	0	Manchester City	2 August 2018	Free	2021
28	Martin Cranie	RB	(England)	Yeovil	39	3	0	Middlesbrough	1 September 2018	Free	2019
Midfielders
4	John Fleck	CM	(Scotland)	Glasgow	35	120	7	Coventry City	11 July 2016	Free	2021
6	Chris Basham	DM/CB	(England)	Hebburn	38	225	12	Blackpool	1 July 2014	Free	2019
7	John Lundstram	CM	(England)	Liverpool	32	48	3	Oxford United	25 July 2017	Undisclosed	2020
8	Kieran Dowell	AM	(England)	Ormskirk	28	3	0	Everton	1 January 2019	Loan	2019
15	Paul Coutts	CM	(Scotland)	Aberdeen	38	133	5	Derby County	23 January 2015	Undisclosed	2019
16	Oliver Norwood	CM	(England)	Burnley	35	26	2	Brighton & Hove Albion	1 January 2019	Undisclosed	Undisclosed
21	Mark Duffy	RM	(England)	Liverpool	40	108	13	Birmingham City	1 July 2016	Free	2021
22	Marvin Johnson	LW	(England)	Birmingham	35	9	0	Middlesbrough	31 August 2018	Loan	2019
–	Jordan Hallam	CM	(England)	Sheffield	27	1	0	Academy	1 July 2016	Trainee	2020
Forwards
10	Billy Sharp	CF	(England)	Sheffield	40	228	95	Leeds United	25 July 2015	Undisclosed	2019
11	Ben Woodburn	LW/CF	(Wales) (England)	Nottingham	26	8	0	Liverpool	1 August 2018	Loan	2019
14	Gary Madine	CF	(England)	Gateshead	36	1	0	Cardiff City	7 January 2018	Loan	2019
17	David McGoldrick	CF	(England) (Republic of Ireland)	Nottingham	38	28	10	Ipswich Town	24 July 2018	Free	2019
39	Conor Washington	CF	(England)	Chatham	34	12	0	Queens Park Rangers	31 August 2018	Free	2019
11	Scott Hogan	CF	(Republic of Ireland) (England)	Salford	34	8	2	Aston Villa	31 January 2019	Loan	2019
Out on Loan
9	Leon Clarke	CF	(England)	Birmingham	41	91	31	Bury	27 July 2016	Undisclosed	2019
24	Daniel Lafferty	LB	(Northern Ireland)	Derry	37	52	5	Burnley	13 January 2017	Undisclosed	2019
26	Ricky Holmes	LM	(England)	Rochford	39	5	0	Charlton Athletic	15 January 2018	Undisclosed	2020
–	Nathan Thomas	LW	(England)	Ingleby Barwick	31	3	2	Hartlepool United	1 July 2017	Undisclosed	2020
–	Ben Heneghan	CB	(England)	Manchester	32	1	0	Motherwell	31 August 2017	Undisclosed	2020
–	Caolan Lavery	CF	(Northern Ireland) (Canada)	Red Deer	33	36	5	Sheffield Wednesday	30 August 2016	Free	2019
–	Ched Evans	CF	(Wales)	Rhyl	37	126	48	Chesterfield	1 July 2017	Undisclosed	2020
–	Regan Slater	CM	(England)	Gleadless	27	3	1	Academy	1 July 2016	Trainee	2020
–	Samir Carruthers	CM	(Republic of Ireland) (England)	Islington	33	31	1	Milton Keynes Dons	3 January 2017	Undisclosed	2020

=== Statistics ===
As of 6 April 2019

No.	Pos	Nat	Player	Total		Championship		FA Cup		League Cup	
No.	Pos	Nat	Player	Apps	Goals	Apps	Goals	Apps	Goals	Apps	Goals
1	GK	(England) ENG	Dean Henderson	46	0	46+0	0	0+0	0	0+0	0
2	DF	(England) ENG	George Baldock	27	1	26+1	1	0+0	0	0+0	0
3	DF	(Republic of Ireland) IRL	Enda Stevens	46	4	45+0	4	0+0	0	1+0	0
4	MF	(Scotland) SCO	John Fleck	46	2	45+0	2	0+0	0	0+1	0
5	DF	(England) ENG	Jack O'Connell	42	3	41+0	3	0+0	0	1+0	0
6	MF	(England) ENG	Chris Basham	42	4	38+2	4	0+1	0	0+1	0
7	MF	(England) ENG	John Lundstram	12	0	5+5	0	1+0	0	1+0	0
8	MF	(England) ENG	Kieran Dowell	17	2	8+8	2	1+0	0	0+0	0
10	FW	(England) ENG	Billy Sharp	42	24	34+6	23	0+1	0	0+1	1
11	FW	(Republic of Ireland) IRL	Scott Hogan	8	2	5+3	2	0+0	0	0+0	0
12	DF	(Republic of Ireland) IRL	John Egan	45	1	44+0	1	0+0	0	1+0	0
14	FW	(England) ENG	Gary Madine	16	3	6+10	3	0+0	0	0+0	0
15	MF	(Scotland) SCO	Paul Coutts	14	0	1+12	0	1+0	0	0+0	0
16	MF	(Northern Ireland) NIR	Oliver Norwood	44	3	43+0	3	0+0	0	1+0	0
17	FW	(Republic of Ireland) IRL	David McGoldrick	45	15	36+9	15	0+0	0	0+0	0
18	DF	(Wales) WAL	Kieron Freeman	22	2	20+0	2	1+0	0	1+0	0
19	DF	(England) ENG	Richard Stearman	17	1	3+13	1	1+0	0	0+0	0
20	DF	(England) ENG	Kean Bryan	1	0	0+0	0	1+0	0	0+0	0
21	MF	(England) ENG	Mark Duffy	37	6	32+3	6	0+1	0	1+0	0
22	MF	(England) ENG	Marvin Johnson	12	0	3+8	0	1+0	0	0+0	0
25	GK	(England) ENG	Simon Moore	2	0	0+0	0	1+0	0	1+0	0
28	DF	(England) ENG	Martin Cranie	16	0	9+6	0	1+0	0	0+0	0
39	FW	(Northern Ireland) NIR	Conor Washington	15	0	3+11	0	1+0	0	0+0	0
Player(s) out on loan:
24	DF	(Northern Ireland) NIR	Daniel Lafferty	1	0	0+1	0	0+0	0	0+0	0
9	FW	(England) ENG	Leon Clarke	27	3	10+15	3	1+0	0	1+0	0
Players who left the club:
8	MF	(Wales) WAL	Lee Evans	2	0	2+0	0	0+0	0	0+0	0
11	FW	(Wales) WAL	Ben Woodburn	8	0	1+6	0	0+0	0	1+0	0
14	MF	(England) ENG	Ryan Leonard	4	0	0+3	0	0+0	0	1+0	0

=== Goals record ===
As of 19 January 2019

1	10	(England)	ST	Billy Sharp	23	0	1	24
2	17	(Republic of Ireland)	ST	David McGoldrick	15	0	0	15
3	21	(England)	AM	Mark Duffy	6	0	0	6
4	6	(England)	DM	Chris Basham	4	0	0	4
4	3	(Republic of Ireland)	DF	Enda Stevens	4	0	0	4
6	16	(Northern Ireland)	MF	Oliver Norwood	3	0	0	3
6	9	(England)	ST	Leon Clarke	3	0	0	3
6	14	(England)	ST	Gary Madine	3	0	0	3
6	5	(England)	DF	Jack O'Connell	3	0	0	3
10	4	(Scotland)	MF	John Fleck	2	0	0	2
10	18	(Wales)	DF	Kieron Freeman	2	0	0	2
10	9	(England)	MF	Kieran Dowell	2	0	0	2
10	11	(Republic of Ireland)	ST	Scott Hogan	2	0	0	2
14	2	(England)	DF	George Baldock	1	0	0	1
14	12	(Republic of Ireland)	DF	John Egan	1	0	0	1
14	19	(England)	DF	Richard Stearman	1	0	0	1
Own Goals					3	0	0	3
Total					78	0	1	79

=== Disciplinary record ===
As of 19 January 2019

Rank	No.	Nat.	Po.	Name	Championship			FA Cup			League Cup			Total		
Rank	No.	Nat.	Po.	Name	Booked	(yellow card) (yellow-red card)	Sent off (straight red)	Booked	(yellow card) (yellow-red card)	Sent off (straight red)	Booked	(yellow card) (yellow-red card)	Sent off (straight red)	Booked	(yellow card) (yellow-red card)	Sent off (straight red)
1	6	(England)	DM	Chris Basham	7	1	0	0	0	0	0	0	0	7	1	0
2	16	(Northern Ireland)	CM	Oliver Norwood	7	0	0	0	0	0	0	0	0	7	0	0
3	3	(Republic of Ireland)	LB	Enda Stevens	6	0	0	0	0	0	0	0	0	6	0	0
4	12	(Republic of Ireland)	CB	John Egan	5	0	0	0	0	0	0	0	0	5	0	0
5	5	(England)	CB	Jack O'Connell	4	0	0	0	0	0	0	0	0	4	0	0
5	17	(England)	CF	David McGoldrick	4	0	0	0	0	0	0	0	0	4	0	0
7	4	(Scotland)	CM	John Fleck	3	0	0	0	0	0	0	0	0	3	0	0
7	10	(England)	CF	Billy Sharp	3	0	0	0	0	0	0	0	0	2	0	0
9	2	(England)	RB	George Baldock	2	0	0	0	0	0	0	0	0	2	0	0
9	10	(England)	DF	Kieron Freeman	2	0	0	0	0	0	0	0	0	2	0	0
11	8	(England)	AM	Kieran Dowell	1	0	0	0	0	0	0	0	0	1	0	0
11	~~8~~	(Wales)	CM	Lee Evans	1	0	0	0	0	0	0	0	0	1	0	0
11	9	(England)	CF	Leon Clarke	1	0	0	0	0	0	0	0	0	1	0	0
11	11	(Wales)	LW	Ben Woodburn	1	0	0	0	0	0	0	0	0	1	0	0
11	15	(Scotland)	CM	Paul Coutts	0	0	0	1	0	0	0	0	0	1	0	0
11	19	(England)	CB	Richard Stearman	0	0	0	1	0	0	0	0	0	1	0	0
11	21	(England)	AM	Mark Duffy	1	0	0	0	0	0	0	0	0	1	0	0
Total					46	1	0	2	0	0	1	0	0	49	1	0

== Transfers ==
=== Transfers in ===
Date from	Position	Nationality	Name	From	Fee	Ref.
1 July 2018	ST	(Republic of Ireland)	Leonardo Gaxha	(Republic of Ireland) Tralee Dynamos	Undisclosed	
4 July 2018	GK	(Germany)	Jordan Amissah	(Germany) Borussia Dortmund	Free transfer	
4 July 2018	MF	(England)	Zak Brunt	Matlock Town	Free transfer	
4 July 2018	DF	(France)	Nicksoen Gomis	(France) Évreux FC 27	Free transfer	
4 July 2018	DF	(England)	Harry Sheppeard	Tadcaster Albion	Free transfer	
4 July 2018	MF	(England)	Reece York	Fulham	Free transfer	
19 July 2018	CB	(Republic of Ireland)	John Egan	Brentford	Undisclosed	
24 July 2018	CF	(Republic of Ireland)	David McGoldrick	Ipswich Town	Free transfer	
2 August 2018	CB	(England)	Kean Bryan	Manchester City	Free transfer	
31 August 2018	CF	(Northern Ireland)	Conor Washington	Queens Park Rangers	Free transfer	
1 September 2018	CB	(England)	Martin Cranie	Middlesbrough	Free transfer	
2 January 2019	FW	(England)	Jake Young	Guiseley	Undisclosed	
4 January 2019	CM	(Northern Ireland)	Oliver Norwood	Brighton & Hove Albion	Undisclosed	

=== Transfers out ===
Date from	Position	Nationality	Name	To	Fee	Ref.
1 July 2018	AM	(Wales)	David Brooks	Bournemouth	Undisclosed	
1 July 2018	CF	(Jamaica)	Clayton Donaldson	Bolton Wanderers	Released	
1 July 2018	CF	(England)	James Hanson	AFC Wimbledon	Undisclosed	
1 July 2018	LB	(England)	Chris Hussey	Cheltenham Town	Released	
1 July 2018	CM	(England)	Louis Reed	Peterborough United	Undisclosed	
18 July 2018	GK	(England)	George Long	Hull City	Undisclosed	
1 January 2019	CM	(Wales)	Lee Evans	Wigan Athletic	Undisclosed	
1 January 2019	CM	(England)	Ryan Leonard	Millwall	£1,500,000	
7 January 2019	CM	(England)	Harvey Gilmour	Tranmere Rovers	Undisclosed	
22 January 2019	CB	(England)	Callum Semple	(Scotland) Ross County	Undisclosed	
25 January 2019	LW	(England)	Jordan Hallam	Scunthorpe United	Free transfer	

=== Loans in ===
Start date	Position	Nationality	Name	From	End date	Ref.
1 July 2018	GK	(England)	Dean Henderson	Manchester United	31 May 2019	
1 August 2018	LW	(Wales)	Ben Woodburn	Liverpool	10 January 2019	
13 August 2018	CM	(Northern Ireland)	Oliver Norwood	Brighton & Hove Albion	4 January 2019	
31 August 2018	LM	(England)	Marvin Johnson	Middlesbrough	31 May 2019	
2 January 2019	AM	(England)	Kieran Dowell	Everton	31 May 2019	
7 January 2019	CF	(England)	Gary Madine	(Wales) Cardiff City	31 May 2019	
31 January 2019	CF	(Republic of Ireland)	Scott Hogan	Aston Villa	31 May 2019	

=== Loans out ===
Start date	Position	Nationality	Name	To	End date	Ref.
14 March 2018	CF	(England)	Jordan Hallam	(Norway) Viking	19 July 2018	
1 July 2018	CM	(Republic of Ireland)	Samir Carruthers	Oxford United	31 May 2019	
3 July 2018	CB	(England)	Ben Heneghan	Blackpool	31 May 2019	
3 July 2018	LW	(England)	Nathan Thomas	Notts County	29 January 2019	
6 July 2018	CB	(England)	Sam Graham	Oldham Athletic	31 January 2019	
13 July 2018	MF	(England)	Harvey Gilmour	Tranmere Rovers	7 January 2019	
13 July 2018	DF	(England)	Callum Semple	(Scotland) Queen of the South	7 January 2019	
20 July 2018	CF	(Wales)	Ched Evans	Fleetwood Town	31 May 2019	
20 July 2018	CM	(England)	Regan Slater	Carlisle United	6 January 2019	
2 August 2018	FW	(England)	Tyler Smith	Barrow	January 2019	
9 August 2018	LM	(England)	Ricky Holmes	Oxford United	31 January 2019	
10 August 2018	CM	(Wales)	Lee Evans	Wigan Athletic	January 2019	
31 August 2018	CF	(Northern Ireland)	Caolan Lavery	Bury	31 May 2019	
31 August 2018	CM	(England)	Ryan Leonard	Millwall	1 January 2019	
14 September 2018	LB	(Wales)	Rhys Norrington-Davies	Barrow	31 May 2019	
9 October 2018	RB	(England)	Jake Bennett	Chesterfield	31 May 2019	
30 October 2018	GK	(England)	Marcus Dewhurst	Gainsborough Trinity	27 November 2018	
30 October 2018	CF	(Northern Ireland)	David Parkhouse	Boston United	27 November 2018	
23 November 2018	CF	(England)	Jordan Hallam	Chesterfield	December 2018	
30 November 2018	CF	(Northern Ireland)	David Parkhouse	Tamworth	3 March 2019	
30 November 2018	CF	(England)	Reon Potts	Tamworth	Work experience	
1 January 2019	CF	(England)	Tyler Smith	Doncaster Rovers	31 May 2019	
2 January 2019	GK	(England)	Marcus Dewhurst	Guiseley	Work experience	
3 January 2019	LB	(Northern Ireland)	Daniel Lafferty	Peterborough United	31 May 2019	
29 January 2019	LW	(England)	Nathan Thomas	Carlisle United	31 May 2019	
30 January 2019	CF	(England)	Leon Clarke	Wigan Athletic	31 May 2019	
31 January 2019	CB	(England)	Sam Graham	(Australia) Central Coast Mariners	31 December 2019	
31 January 2019	LW	(England)	Ricky Holmes	Gillingham	4 May 2019	
31 January 2019	MF	(Republic of Ireland)	Stephen Mallon	(Australia) Central Coast Mariners	31 December 2019	
5 February 2019	CB	(Republic of Ireland)	Jordan Doherty	(United States) Tampa Bay Rowdies	20 October 2019	

== Competitions ==
=== Friendlies ===
Sheffield United announced, on 16 May 2018, that a friendly away to Stocksbridge Park Steels was scheduled for 7 July. Three fixtures, against Bradford City, Mansfield Town and Doncaster Rovers, were revealed on 18 May.

7 July 2018 Friendly	Stocksbridge Park Steels	1–5	Sheffield United	Stocksbridge
15:00 BST		Report	Fleck 12'; Sharp 17', 42'; Smith 48'; Lavery 78'	Stadium: Look Local Stadium; Attendance: 1,324

12 July 2018 Friendly	(Portugal) Marítimo	0–1	Sheffield United	Estômbar e Parchal, Portugal
19:00 BST		Report	Evans 86'	Stadium: Estádio Municipal da Bela Vista

17 July 2018 Friendly	Bradford City	2–3	Sheffield United	Bradford
19:30 BST	Payne 53'; Brünker 80'	Report	Fleck 6'; Clarke 34'; Sharp 84'	Stadium: Valley Parade

21 July 2018 Friendly	Mansfield Town	0–0	Sheffield United	Mansfield
15:00 BST		Report		Stadium: Field Mill

24 July 2018 Friendly	Sheffield United	1–1	(Italy) Inter Milan	Sheffield
19:30 BST	McGoldrick 28'	Report	Icardi 35'	Stadium: Bramall Lane

27 July 2018 Friendly	Doncaster Rovers	0–2	Sheffield United	Doncaster
19:45 BST		Report	McGoldrick 74'; Sharp 79'	Stadium: Keepmoat Stadium

=== Championship ===
==== League table ====
Pos	Team	Pld	W	D	L	GF	GA	GD	Pts	Promotion, qualification or relegation
1	Norwich City (C, P)	46	27	13	6	93	57	+36	94	Promotion to the Premier League
2	Sheffield United (P)	46	26	11	9	78	41	+37	89	Promotion to the Premier League
3	Leeds United	46	25	8	13	73	50	+23	83	Qualification for Championship play-offs (Note: Four teams play for one spot and promotion to the Premier League.)
4	West Bromwich Albion	46	23	11	12	87	62	+25	80	Qualification for Championship play-offs
5	Aston Villa (O, P)	46	20	16	10	82	61	+21	76	Qualification for Championship play-offs
6	Derby County	46	20	14	12	69	54	+15	74	Qualification for Championship play-offs

Source: Sky Sports Archived 25 September 2019 at the Wayback Machine
Rules for classification: 1) Points; 2) Goal difference; 3) Number of goals scored; 4) Head-to-head results
(C) Champions; (O) Play-off winners; (P) Promoted

==== Results summary ====
Overall								Home						Away					
Pld	W	D	L	GF	GA	GD	Pts	W	D	L	GF	GA	GD	W	D	L	GF	GA	GD
46	26	11	9	78	41	+37	89	15	4	4	42	17	+25	11	7	5	36	24	+12

Last updated: 27 April 2019.

==== Results by matchday ====
Matchday	1	2	3	4	5	6	7	8	9	10	11	12	13	14	15	16	17	18	19	20	21	22	23	24	25	26	27	28	29	30	31	32	33	34	35	36	37	38	39	40	41	42	43	44	45	46
Ground	H	A	A	H	A	H	A	H	H	A	A	H	A	H	H	A	H	A	A	H	A	H	A	H	H	A	H	A	A	H	A	H	H	A	A	H	H	A	H	A	A	H	H	A	H	A
Result	L	L	W	W	W	W	L	D	W	W	W	W	L	D	W	L	D	D	W	L	W	L	D	W	W	W	W	L	D	W	D	W	W	W	D	W	W	W	L	W	D	D	W	W	W	D
Position	21	24	12	8	7	3	5	6	4	4	3	1	2	2	1	3	2	5	4	6	3	4	6	4	4	3	2	3	3	3	3	3	2	2	3	3	3	2	3	2	3	3	2	2	2	2

Updated to match(es) played on 27 April 2019. Source:
A = Away; H = Home; W = Win; D = Draw; L = Loss

==== Matches ====
On 21 June 2018, the Championship fixtures for the forthcoming season were announced.

4 August 2018 1	Sheffield United	1–2	Swansea City	Sheffield
17:30 BST	Baldock 62'	Report	McBurnie 71'; Dhanda 85'	Stadium: Bramall Lane; Attendance: 24,654; Referee: Jeremy Simpson

7 August 2018 2	Middlesbrough	3–0	Sheffield United	Middlesbrough
19:45 BST	Braithwaite 7'; Flint 18'; Downing 25'	Report		Stadium: Riverside Stadium; Attendance: 22,960; Referee: Robert Jones

11 August 2018 3	Queens Park Rangers	1–2	Sheffield United	Shepherd's Bush
15:00 BST	Eze 29'; Lynch (yellow card) 67'	Report	Sharp 43'; McGoldrick 65'; Woodburn (yellow card) 90+5'	Stadium: Loftus Road; Attendance: 14,128; Referee: Scott Duncan

18 August 2018 4	Sheffield United	2–1	Norwich City	Sheffield
15:00 BST	Egan 9'; Sharp 90+3'	Report	Rhodes 26'	Stadium: Bramall Lane; Attendance: 23,850; Referee: Darren Bond

25 August 2018 5	Bolton Wanderers	0–3	Sheffield United	Bolton
15:00 BST		Report	Duffy 5'; Freeman 22'; Fleck 73'	Stadium: University of Bolton Stadium; Attendance: 14,848; Referee: Andrew Madley

1 September 2018 6	Sheffield United	4–1	Aston Villa	Sheffield
15:00 BST	O'Connell 6'; Duffy 23'; Basham (yellow card) 27'; Norwood 41'; Sharp 49'	Report	El Ghazi 61'; Grealish (yellow card) 83'	Stadium: Bramall Lane; Attendance: 26,030; Referee: James Linington

15 September 2018 7	Bristol City	1–0	Sheffield United	Bristol
15:00 BST	Watkins 81'	Report		Stadium: Ashton Gate Stadium; Attendance: 20,540; Referee: John Brooks

19 September 2018 8	Sheffield United	0–0	Birmingham City	Sheffield
19:45 BST		Report		Stadium: Bramall Lane; Attendance: 23,525; Referee: Gavin Ward

22 September 2018 9	Sheffield United	3–2	Preston North End	Sheffield
15:00 BST	Sharp 36'; Basham 51'; McGoldrick 87'	Report	Robinson 80'; Johnson 82'	Stadium: Bramall Lane; Attendance: 23,857; Referee: Scott Duncan

29 September 2018 10	Millwall	2–3	Sheffield United	London
15:00 BST	Cooper 47'; Gregory 50'	Report	Sharp 40'; McGoldrick 79', 88'	Stadium: The Den; Attendance: 13,145; Referee: Andy Davies

3 October 2018 11	Blackburn Rovers	0–2	Sheffield United	Blackburn
19:45 BST		Report	Sharp 66', 79'	Stadium: Ewood Park; Attendance: 14,440; Referee: Robert Jones

6 October 2018 12	Sheffield United	1–0	Hull City	Sheffield
15:00 BST	McGoldrick 70' (pen.)	Report		Stadium: Bramall Lane; Attendance: 25,360; Referee: Peter Bankes

20 October 2018 13	Derby County	2–1	Sheffield United	Derby
17:30 BST	Bryson 1'; Marriott 77'	Report	Basham 41', (yellow card) 70'	Stadium: Pride Park Stadium; Attendance: 27,927; Referee: Oliver Langford

23 October 2018 14	Sheffield United	1–1	Stoke City	Sheffield
19:45 BST	Clarke 70'	Report	Allen 88'	Stadium: Bramall Lane; Attendance: 24,463; Referee: Gavin Ward

27 October 2018 15	Sheffield United	4–2	Wigan Athletic	Sheffield
15:00 BST	Dunkley 23' (o.g.); Sharp 45', 53', 63'	Report	Naismith 39'; Garner 69'	Stadium: Bramall Lane; Attendance: 24,429; Referee: Tony Harrington

3 November 2018 16	Nottingham Forest	1–0	Sheffield United	West Bridgford
15:00 GMT	Cash (yellow card) 34'; Grabban 69'; Figueiredo (yellow card) 71'; Robinson (yellow card) 90'	Report	Egan (yellow card) 88'	Stadium: The City Ground; Attendance: 28,757; Referee: Scott Duncan

9 November 2018 17	Sheffield United	0–0	Sheffield Wednesday	Sheffield
19:45 GMT		Report	Bannan (yellow card) 71'; Baker (yellow card) 86'; Hector (yellow card) 89'	Stadium: Bramall Lane; Attendance: 30,261; Referee: Andrew Madley

24 November 2018 18	Rotherham United	2–2	Sheffield United	Rotherham
12:30 GMT	Taylor 66'; Proctor 90+2'	Report	Duffy 8'; Basham 85'	Stadium: New York Stadium; Referee: Peter Bankes

27 November 2018 19	Brentford	2–3	Sheffield United	Brentford
19:45 GMT	Maupay 6'; Fleck 65' (o.g.)	Report	Konsa 10' (o.g.); Norwood 15'; Clarke 72'	Stadium: Griffin Park; Attendance: 8,903; Referee: Stephen Martin

1 December 2018 20	Sheffield United	0–1	Leeds United	Sheffield
15:00 GMT	Stevens (yellow card) 25'; Egan (yellow card) 33'; Baldock (yellow card) 53'; Norwood (yellow card) 80'	Report	Hernández 82'; Halme (yellow card) 85'; Klich (yellow card) 90+3'	Stadium: Bramall Lane; Attendance: 25,794; Referee: Oliver Langford

8 December 2018 21	Reading	0–2	Sheffield United	Reading
17:30 GMT (UTC)	Loader (yellow card) 80'	Report	Fleck (yellow card) 23'; Sharp 84'; Baldock 86' (o.g.)	Stadium: Madejski Stadium; Attendance: 12,066; Referee: James Linington

14 December 2018 22	Sheffield United	1–2	West Bromwich Albion	Sheffield
19:45 GMT	McGoldrick 12'	Report	Barry 41'; Gibbs 76'	Stadium: Bramall Lane; Attendance: 23,400; Referee: Jeremy Simpson

22 December 2018 23	Ipswich Town	1–1	Sheffield United	Ipswich
15:00 GMT	Harrison 38'; Chalobah (yellow card) 40'; Spence (yellow card) 90+2'	Report	Sharp 47'; Basham (yellow card) 70'; Norwood (yellow card) 84'	Stadium: Portman Road; Attendance: 17,942; Referee: Andy Woolmer

26 December 2018 24	Sheffield United	3–1	Derby County	Sheffield
15:00 GMT	Stevens (yellow card) 32'; Sharp 41'; Duffy (yellow card) 45+1'; McGoldrick 64'; Norwood (yellow card) 75'; Clarke 84'	Report	Wilson (yellow card) 28', (goal) 53'; Keogh (yellow card) 54'; Tomori (yellow card) 82'; Carson (yellow card) 89'; Nugent (yellow card) 89'	Stadium: Bramall Lane; Attendance: 28,974; Referee: Geoff Eltringham

29 December 2018 25	Sheffield United	3–0	Blackburn Rovers	Sheffield
15:00 GMT	Basham (yellow card) 9' (yellow-red card) 51'; Norwood (yellow card) 30'; Egan (yellow card) 50'; Sharp (yellow card) 70', (goal) 73', 77'; McGoldrick 82', (yellow card) 85'	Report	Palmer (yellow card) 59'; Smallwood (red card) 71'	Stadium: Bramall Lane; Attendance: 27,384; Referee: Anthony Taylor

1 January 2019 26	Wigan Athletic	0–3	Sheffield United	Wigan
15:00 GMT	Massey (yellow card) 35'; McManaman (yellow card) 62'	Report	McGoldrick 40'; Duffy 48'; Stevens (yellow card) 52'; Sharp 54'; Fleck (yellow card) 83'	Stadium: DW Stadium; Attendance: 13,054; Referee: Andrew Madley

12 January 2019 27	Sheffield United	1–0	Queens Park Rangers	Sheffield
15:00 GMT	McGoldrick 37'	Report		Stadium: Bramall Lane; Attendance: 25,501; Referee: Andy Woolmer

19 January 2019 28	Swansea City	1–0	Sheffield United	Swansea
17:30 GMT	McBurnie 65'	Report		Stadium: Liberty Stadium; Attendance: 18,673; Referee: John Brooks

26 January 2019 29	Norwich City	2–2	Sheffield United	Norwich
15:00 GMT	Hernández 11'; Krul (yellow card) 45+4'; Pukki 56'; Trybull (yellow card) 77'; Zimmermann (yellow card) 86'	Report	Sharp 45+4' (pen.), 79'; Basham (yellow card) 81'; Duffy (yellow card) 86'	Stadium: Carrow Road; Attendance: 26,844; Referee: James Linington

2 February 2019 30	Sheffield United	2–0	Bolton Wanderers	Sheffield
15:00 GMT	McGoldrick 56'; Sharp 73'	Report	Connolly (yellow card) 62'	Stadium: Bramall Lane; Attendance: 26,131; Referee: Keith Stroud

8 February 2019 31	Aston Villa	3–3	Sheffield United	Aston
19:45 GMT	Jedinak (yellow card) 14'; Hutton (yellow card) 60'; Whelan (yellow card) 73'; Mings 82'; Abraham 86'; Green 90+4'	Report	Sharp 11', 53', 62'; Basham (yellow card) 42'; Egan (yellow card) 72'; Baldock (yellow card) 88'	Stadium: Villa Park; Attendance: 34,892; Referee: Tony Harrington

13 February 2019 32	Sheffield United	1–0	Middlesbrough	Sheffield
19:45 GMT	Norwood (yellow card) 38'; Stearman 61'; Fleck (yellow card) 76'	Report	Shotton (yellow card) 35'; Ayala (yellow card) 57' (yellow-red card) 64'	Stadium: Bramall Lane; Attendance: 24,805; Referee: Andy Woolmer

16 February 2019 33	Sheffield United	4–0	Reading	Sheffield
15:00GMT	Freeman 1'; Norwood (yellow card) 13'; Madine 16', 44'; Fleck 49'; Cranie (yellow card) 57'	Report	Swift (yellow card) 71'	Stadium: Bramall Lane; Attendance: 26,513; Referee: Robert Jones

23 February 2019 34	West Bromwich Albion	0–1	Sheffield United	West Bromwich
17:30 GMT	Dawson (yellow card) 82'; Rodriguez (yellow card) 84'	Report	Dowell 14' (yellow card) 19'; Stevens (yellow card) 80'; Madine (yellow card) 90+5'	Stadium: The Hawthorns; Attendance: 24,928; Referee: Oliver Langford

4 March 2019 35	Sheffield Wednesday	0–0	Sheffield United	Sheffield
19:45 GMT		Report		Stadium: Hillsborough Stadium; Attendance: 31,630; Referee: Peter Bankes

9 March 2019 36	Sheffield United	2–0	Rotherham United	Sheffield
12:15 GMT	O'Connell 5'; Duffy 74'	Report	Vaulks (red card) 28'	Stadium: Bramall Lane; Attendance: 27,402; Referee: Geoff Eltringham

12 March 2019 37	Sheffield United	2–0	Brentford	Sheffield
19:45 GMT	Basham (yellow card) 20'; Norwood 26' (pen.); Madine (red card) 35'; McGoldrick 84'	Report		Stadium: Bramall Lane; Attendance: 24,463; Referee: Tony Harrington

16 March 2019 38	Leeds United	0–1	Sheffield United	Leeds
12:30 GMT	Casilla (red card) 90+1'	Report	Baldock (yellow card) 18'; Sharp (yellow card) 62'; Basham 71'	Stadium: Elland Road; Attendance: 37,004; Referee: David Coote

30 March 2019 39	Sheffield United	2–3	Bristol City	Sheffield
15:00 GMT	Sharp 6'; Norwood (yellow card) 66'; Hogan 71'	Report	Hunt (yellow card) 15'; Pack (yellow card) 24'; Weimann 30', 77', 83' (yellow card) 79'; Palmer (yellow card) 88'	Stadium: Bramall Lane; Attendance: 30,030; Referee: James Linington

6 April 2019 40	Preston North End	0–1	Sheffield United	Preston
15:00 GMT		Report	McGoldrick 33'	Stadium: Deepdale Stadium; Attendance: 18,339; Referee: Gavin Ward

10 April 2019 41	Birmingham City	1–1	Sheffield United	Bordesley
19:45 BST	Davis (yellow card) 34'; Morrison 42'; Pedersen (yellow card) 65'	Report	Stevens 38'	Stadium: St Andrew's; Attendance: 22,351; Referee: Darren Bond

13 April 2019 42	Sheffield United	1–1	Millwall	Sheffield
15:00 BST	Madine 51'; Fleck (yellow card) 62'; Egan (red card) 85'	Report	Wallace (yellow card) 59'; Marshall (penalty missed) 87'; Cooper (yellow card) 90+5' (goal) 90+5'	Stadium: Bramall Lane; Attendance: 26,703; Referee: David Webb

19 April 2019 43	Sheffield United	2–0	Nottingham Forest	Sheffield
15:00 BST	Duffy 51'; Cranie (yellow card) 45+1'; Baldock (yellow card) 77'; Stevens 85'; Norwood (yellow card) 86'	Report	Colback (yellow card) 19'; Byram (yellow card) 43'; Benalouane (red card) 47'	Stadium: Bramall Lane; Attendance: 28,403; Referee: Andy Madley

22 April 2019 44	Hull City	0–3	Sheffield United	Kingston-upon-Hull
15:00 BST		Report	McGoldrick 10', 22'; Stevens 42'	Stadium: KCOM Stadium; Attendance: 14,116; Referee: Graham Scott

27 April 2019 45	Sheffield United	2–0	Ipswich Town	Sheffield
17:15 BST	Hogan 24'; O'Connell 71'	Report	Judge (yellow card) 45+2'	Stadium: Bramall Lane; Attendance: 30,140; Referee: Tim Robinson

27 April 2019 46	Stoke City	2–2	Sheffield United	Stoke-on-Trent
12:30 BST	Vokes 19'; Woods (yellow card) 57'; Shawcross 69'	Report	Fleck (yellow card) 43'; Dowell 48'; Stevens 77'	Stadium: bet365 Stadium; Attendance: 26,665; Referee: Geoff Eltringham

=== FA Cup ===
The third round draw was made live on BBC by Ruud Gullit and Paul Ince from Stamford Bridge on 3 December 2018.

6 January 2019 Third round	Sheffield United	0–1	Barnet	Sheffield
14:00 GMT	Coutts (yellow card) 12'; Stearman (yellow card) 20'	Report	Coulthirst 21' (pen.); Adams (yellow card) 68'; Reynolds (yellow card) 89'	Stadium: Bramall Lane; Attendance: 9,906; Referee: Tony Harrington

=== EFL Cup ===
On 15 June 2018, the draw for the first round was made in Vietnam.

14 August 2018 First round	Sheffield United	1–1 (4–5 p)	Hull City	Sheffield
19:45 BST	Sharp 75'	Report	Toral 18'	Stadium: Bramall Lane; Attendance: 6,327; Referee: Martin Coy
	Penalties
	Norwood (penalty missed); Sharp (penalty scored); Woodburn (penalty scored); O'Connell (penalty scored); Basham (penalty scored)		Toral (penalty scored); Keane (penalty scored); Grosicki (penalty scored); Fleming (penalty scored); Stewart (penalty scored)
