= Enda Stevens =

Irish association football player (born 1990)

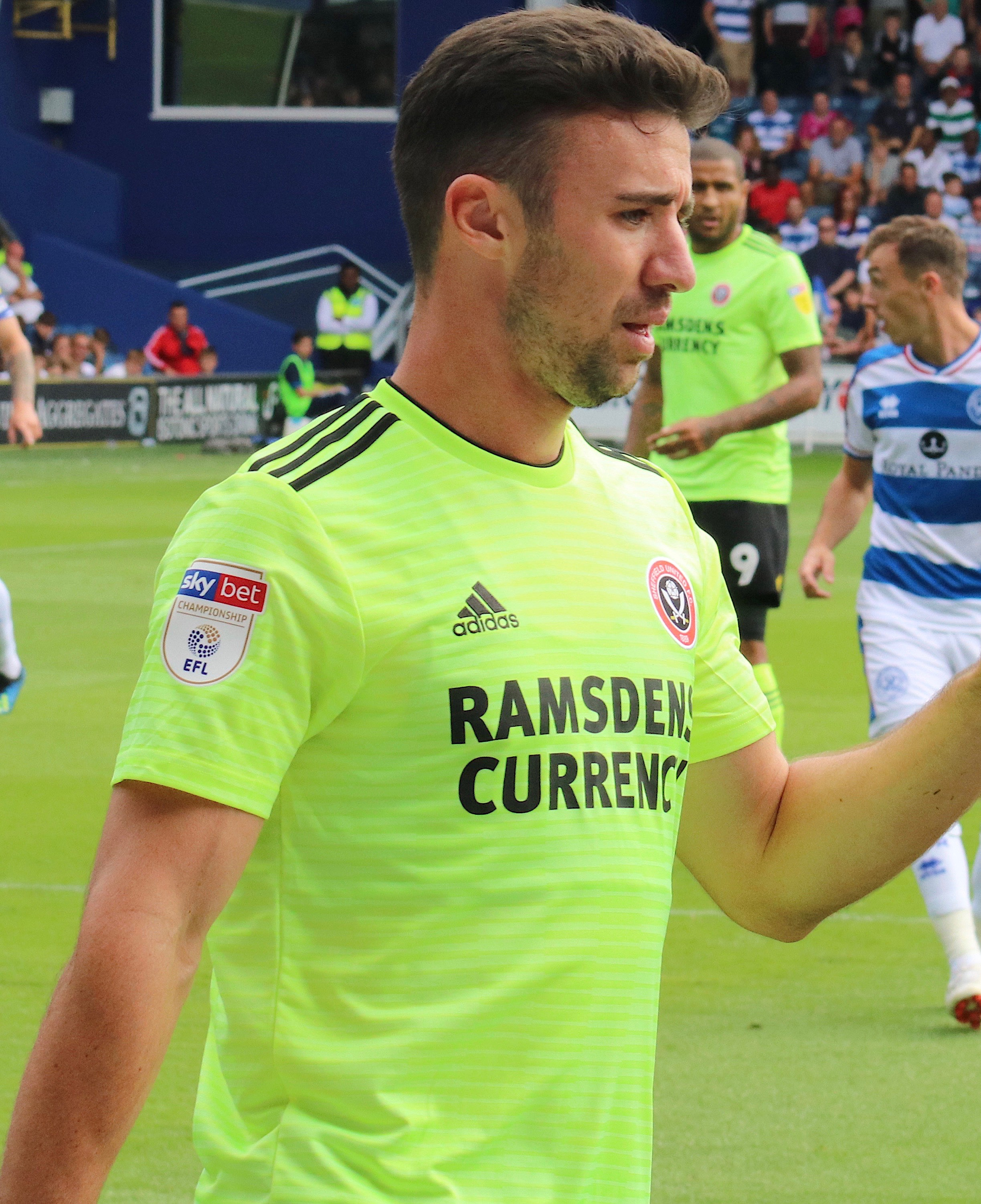
- Stevens playing for Sheffield United in 2018

Personal information
- Full name: Enda John Stevens
- Date of birth: 9 July 1990 (age 36)
- Place of birth: Dublin, Ireland
- Height: 1.83 m (6 ft 0 in)
- Position: Left back

Team information
- Current team: Shamrock Rovers
- Number: 3

Youth career
- 2004–2006: Cherry Orchard

Senior career*
Years	Team	Apps	(Gls)
2008	UCD	2	(0)
2009	St Patrick's Athletic	30	(0)
2010–2011	Shamrock Rovers	46	(0)
2012–2015	Aston Villa	7	(0)
2013	→ Notts County (loan)	2	(0)
2013–2014	→ Doncaster Rovers (loan)	13	(0)
2014	→ Northampton Town (loan)	4	(1)
2014–2015	→ Doncaster Rovers (loan)	28	(1)
2015–2017	Portsmouth	90	(1)
2017–2023	Sheffield United	192	(8)
2023–2025	Stoke City	39	(0)
2026–	Shamrock Rovers	16	(1)

International career^{‡}
2011	Republic of Ireland U21	3	(0)
2018–2023	Republic of Ireland	26	(0)
- * Club domestic league appearances and goals as of 16:53, 9 November 2026 (UTC) ‡ National team caps and goals as of 16:53, 9 November 2026 (UTC)

Enda John Stevens (born 9 July 1990) is an Irish professional footballer who plays as a left-back for League of Ireland Premier Division club Shamrock Rovers.

Stevens started his career in the League of Ireland with UCD, before gaining experience of European football with St Patrick's Athletic and Shamrock Rovers. Following Rovers' exit from the 2011–12 UEFA Europa League, Stevens joined Aston Villa in the Premier League. After a sequence of loan spells with, Notts County, Doncaster Rovers (two spells) and Northampton Town he signed for Portsmouth in 2015. He joined Sheffield United in May 2017 where he spent six-years earning promotion to the Premier League twice. He signed for Stoke City in the summer of 2023. He returned to Shamrock Rovers ahead of their 2026 season.

== Early life ==
Stevens was born in Dublin and attended Templeogue College. He played Gaelic football for St James Gaels and Templeogue Synge Street before playing association football professionally.

== Club career ==
=== Early career ===
Following a spell in the Cherry Orchard youth team Stevens signed professionally with UCD but was released at the end of the 2008 season after making two appearances. He had unsuccessful trials in England with Hull City, Nottingham Forest, Stockport County and Yeovil Town. He was one of Jeff Kenna's first signings for St Patrick's Athletic. He made his debut in a 1–0 win over Cork City at Turners Cross in March 2009. Stevens made a breakthrough into the first team where he made himself the first choice left back with performances in the league, FAI Cup, and Europa League qualifiers. He made six appearances in the 2009–10 UEFA Europa League as Pats advanced past Valletta and Krylia Sovetov before losing to Steaua București.

=== Shamrock Rovers ===
Stevens signed for Shamrock Rovers in December 2009. Stevens made his Rovers League debut at home to Dundalk on 21 March 2010. In his first season with Rovers under the management of Michael O'Neill he made 27 appearances as the team claimed the League of Ireland Premier Division title on goal difference over local rivals Bohemians. Stevens played against Italian giants Juventus in the Europa League qualifiers, Rovers losing a respectable 3–0 on aggregate.

In the 2011 season Stevens played in 45 matches, helping Rovers win the Setanta Cup and League of Ireland title. In Europe, Stevens played in all 12 of Rovers' matches. In the Champions League after edging past Estonians Flora Tallinn they were eliminated by Copenhagen, dropping down to the Europa League. In the play-off round Rovers faced Serbian side Partizan Belgrade, after a 1–1 draw in Dublin Rovers won 2–1 in extra time to become the first Irish club to reach the group stages of a European competition. They were drawn against PAOK, Rubin Kazan and Tottenham Hotspur where they found the quality too much losing all six matches. He capped off a memorable year by winning the PFAI Young Player of the Year award.

=== Aston Villa ===
On 31 August 2011, it was announced by Aston Villa manager Alex McLeish that Stevens would sign a three-year contract with the Premier League club, effective from January 2012. The agreement allowed Stevens to remain at Rovers until January 2012 to support them in their maiden UEFA Europa League campaign. Following Shamrock Rovers' exit from European competition, Aston Villa officially announced the signing of Stevens on 3 January 2012. Stevens spent his first months at Villa playing for the reserve team. He made his full debut for the team, starting in Villa's 3–0 win against Tranmere Rovers in the League Cup second round and also came off the bench in the fourth round win over Swindon Town.

Stevens made his first league appearance for Villa on 3 November 2012, in a 1–0 win against Sunderland, coming on as a substitute for Eric Lichaj. Stevens made his full league debut for Villa in the next match, starting against Manchester United on 10 November 2012, due to an injury to Joe Bennett and the suspension of Lichaj. In the next game, only Stevens' third league appearance for the club, the Villa defence conceded five goals as they were beaten 5–0 by Manchester City. Stevens played in nine matches for Villa in 2012–13 with his last coming in January 2013, Stevens spending the remainder of the campaign back with the reserves. In 2013–14 pre-season Stevens was made available for transfer by manager Paul Lambert who told him he had no future at Villa. Speaking in December 2017, Stevens admitted that it was his own fault that he was unable to make the breakthrough at Villa—"I just wasn't ready for it. I didn't appreciate how tough it would be at all. It's a totally different level and I don't mean this in any way to be disrespectful to the League of Ireland, but it was a different world. Everything was a massive, massive step up in terms of the professionalism, athleticism, the fitness levels required the dedication needed to make it over here. I struggled to cope with it all if I am being honest, a big part of the reason why I didn't make it at Villa was my fault."

Stevens joined League One side Notts County on a 28-day emergency loan in August 2013. He made his debut in a League Cup tie against Liverpool. Stevens returned to Aston Villa after a month's loan, having made four appearances in all competitions for the Magpies. Stevens signed on a one-month loan deal with Championship side Doncaster Rovers on 28 November 2013. His loan was extended until the end of the 2013–14 season. He made 14 appearances for Doncaster as they suffered relegation on the final day. He then signed a one-month loan deal with Northampton Town on 10 October 2014. He played four times for the Cobblers which included his first goal in professional football that came in a 3–1 defeat against Oxford United on 21 October 2014. Stevens re-joined Doncaster on a one-month loan on 6 November 2014. This was extended until the end of the 2014–15 season. He was released by Villa in the summer of 2015 following the expiration of his contract.

=== Portsmouth ===
Following his released from Villa Stevens signed a two-year deal with League Two side Portsmouth on 15 June 2015. In his first season at Portsmouth, Stevens quickly established himself as a key member of one of the leagues' tightest defences, racking up 53 appearances in the process, as Portsmouth finished sixth in manager Paul Cook's first season in charge. They faced Plymouth Argyle in the EFL League Two play-offs and after a 2–2 draw in the first-leg Plymouth won the second-leg 1–0 with a 90th-minute winner.

Stevens scored his only goal for Portsmouth in a 3–2 win against Newport County on 26 December 2016. Stevens was again first-choice left-back with Pompey in the 2016–17 season, making 46 appearances as they won the League Two title after beating Cheltenham Town 6–1 on the final day. Stevens also had a very successful season on an individual level as he was named in the EFL Team of the Season, the PFA Team of the Year and PFA Fans' Player of the Year for League Two, and was also named Portsmouth's player of the season.

=== Sheffield United ===
Stevens' form for Portsmouth attracted the interest of Championship clubs and he joined Sheffield United on a three-year contract in May 2017. He became first-choice left back under Chris Wilder in 2017–18, making 47 appearances as the Blades finished in tenth. In 2018–19 Stevens made 46 appearances, scoring a career best of four goals as United gained promotion to the Premier League finishing 2nd.

In March 2020, Stevens signed a contract extension that saw him remain at Sheffield United until 2023. Stevens was one of United's stand out players in their 2019–20 Premier League campaign as the team finished in 9th position after being heavily tipped for relegation. The 2020–21 season proved to a disastrous one for the Blades as they failed to win any of their first 17 fixtures and remained rooted to the foot of the table all season. Their relegation was confirmed following a 1–0 defeat against Wolves on 17 April 2021. Stevens played 24 times in 2021–22, missing three months due to a calf injury. United finished in 5th position and lost in the EFL Championship play-offs to Nottingham Forest on penalties. Stevens had a reduced role in 2022–23, playing 13 times under Paul Heckingbottom as the team finished 2nd, gaining a return to the Premier League. He was released by Sheffield United following the expiration of his contract.

=== Stoke City ===
Following his departure from Sheffield United, Stevens joined Championship club Stoke City on 5 July 2023, signing a one-year contract. He was sent-off for two bookable offences against Queens Park Rangers on 28 November. He suffered an injury against Sheffield Wednesday on 9 December which kept him out until 29 March 2024 where under Steven Schumacher, Stevens played in the final eight matches helping Stoke avoid relegation. Stevens' performances towards the end of the 2023–24 season earned him a one-year contract extension. Stevens struggled with injuries in the 2024–25 season, making 21 appearances, as Stoke avoided relegation on the final day, finishing in 18th position. He departed the club upon the expiration of his contract at the end of the season.

=== Return to Shamrock Rovers ===
After six months without a club, on 28 November 2025, it was announced that Stevens would be returning to his former club Shamrock Rovers ahead of their 2026 League of Ireland Premier Division season. On 25 May 2026, he scored his first League of Ireland goal, with a 95th-minute winner in a 2–1 victory away to Bohemians in the last derby ever at Dalymount Park before its demolition and reconstruction.

== International career ==
Stevens made his Republic of Ireland U21 debut in a friendly in Cyprus in February 2011. Stevens made his debut for the Republic of Ireland senior team on 3 June 2018 in a 2–1 friendly victory against the United States, coming on as a late substitute for Shane Duffy.

== Career statistics ==
=== Club ===
As of match played 4 September 2026

Appearances and goals by club, season and competition
Club	Season	League			National Cup (Note: Includes FAI Cup and FA Cup)		League Cup (Note: Includes League of Ireland Cup and EFL Cup)		Other		Total	
Club	Season	Division	Apps	Goals	Apps	Goals	Apps	Goals	Apps	Goals	Apps	Goals
UCD	2008	League of Ireland Premier Division	2	0	0	0	0	0	—		2	0
St Patrick's Athletic	2009	League of Ireland Premier Division	30	0	5	0	1	0	6 (Note: Appearances in UEFA Europa League)	0	42	0
Shamrock Rovers	2010	League of Ireland Premier Division	18	0	5	0	1	0	3	0	27	0
Shamrock Rovers	2011	League of Ireland Premier Division	28	0	1	0	0	0	16 (Note: Four appearances in Setanta Sports Cup, four in UEFA Champions League and eight in UEFA Europa League)	0	45	0
Shamrock Rovers	Total		46	0	6	0	1	0	25	0	72	0
Aston Villa	2011–12	Premier League	0	0	0	0	0	0	—		0	0
Aston Villa	2012–13	Premier League	7	0	0	0	2	0	—		9	0
Aston Villa	2013–14	Premier League	0	0	0	0	0	0	—		0	0
Aston Villa	2014–15	Premier League	0	0	0	0	0	0	—		0	0
Aston Villa	Total		7	0	0	0	2	0	0	0	9	0
Notts County (loan)	2013–14	League One	2	0	0	0	1	0	1 (Note: Appearance in Football League Trophy)	0	4	0
Doncaster Rovers (loan)	2013–14	Championship	13	0	1	0	0	0	—		14	0
Northampton Town (loan)	2014–15	League Two	4	1	0	0	0	0	0	0	4	1
Doncaster Rovers (loan)	2014–15	League One	28	1	4	0	0	0	0	0	32	1
Portsmouth	2015–16	League Two	45	0	5	0	1	0	2 (Note: Appearances in League Two play-offs)	0	53	0
Portsmouth	2016–17	League Two	45	1	1	0	0	0	0	0	46	1
Portsmouth	Total		90	1	6	0	1	0	3	0	99	1
Sheffield United	2017–18	Championship	45	1	2	0	0	0	—		47	1
Sheffield United	2018–19	Championship	45	4	0	0	1	0	—		46	4
Sheffield United	2019–20	Premier League	38	2	1	0	1	0	—		40	2
Sheffield United	2020–21	Premier League	30	0	2	0	0	0	—		32	0
Sheffield United	2021–22	Championship	22	1	0	0	1	1	1 (Note: Appearances in Championship play-offs)	0	24	2
Sheffield United	2022–23	Championship	12	0	1	0	0	0	—		13	0
Sheffield United	Total		192	8	6	0	3	1	1	0	202	9
Stoke City	2023–24	Championship	21	0	0	0	0	0	—		21	0
Stoke City	2024–25	Championship	18	0	2	0	1	0	—		21	0
Stoke City	Total		39	0	2	0	1	0	0	0	42	0
Shamrock Rovers	2026	League of Ireland Premier Division	16	1	2	0	—		7 (Note: 2 appearances in UEFA Champions League; 2 appearances in UEFA Europa League; 2 appearances in UEFA Conference League; 1 appearance in Leinster Senior Cup)	0	25	1
Career total			469	12	32	0	10	1	36	0	548	13

=== International ===
Appearances and goals by national team and year
National team	Year	Apps	Goals
Republic of Ireland	2018	6	0
Republic of Ireland	2019	8	0
Republic of Ireland	2020	5	0
Republic of Ireland	2021	4	0
Republic of Ireland	2022	2	0
Republic of Ireland	2023	1	0
Total		26	0

== Honours ==
Shamrock Rovers

- League of Ireland Premier Division: 2010, 2011, 2026
- Setanta Sports Cup: 2011

Portsmouth

- EFL League Two: 2016–17

Sheffield United

- EFL Championship runner-up: 2018–19, 2022–23

Individual

- PFAI Young Player of the Year: 2011
- EFL Team of the Season: 2016–17
- PFA Team of the Year: 2016–17 League Two
- PFA Fans' Player of the Year: 2016–17 League Two
- Portsmouth Player of the season: 2016–17
