= Kieron Freeman =

Welsh footballer (born 1992)

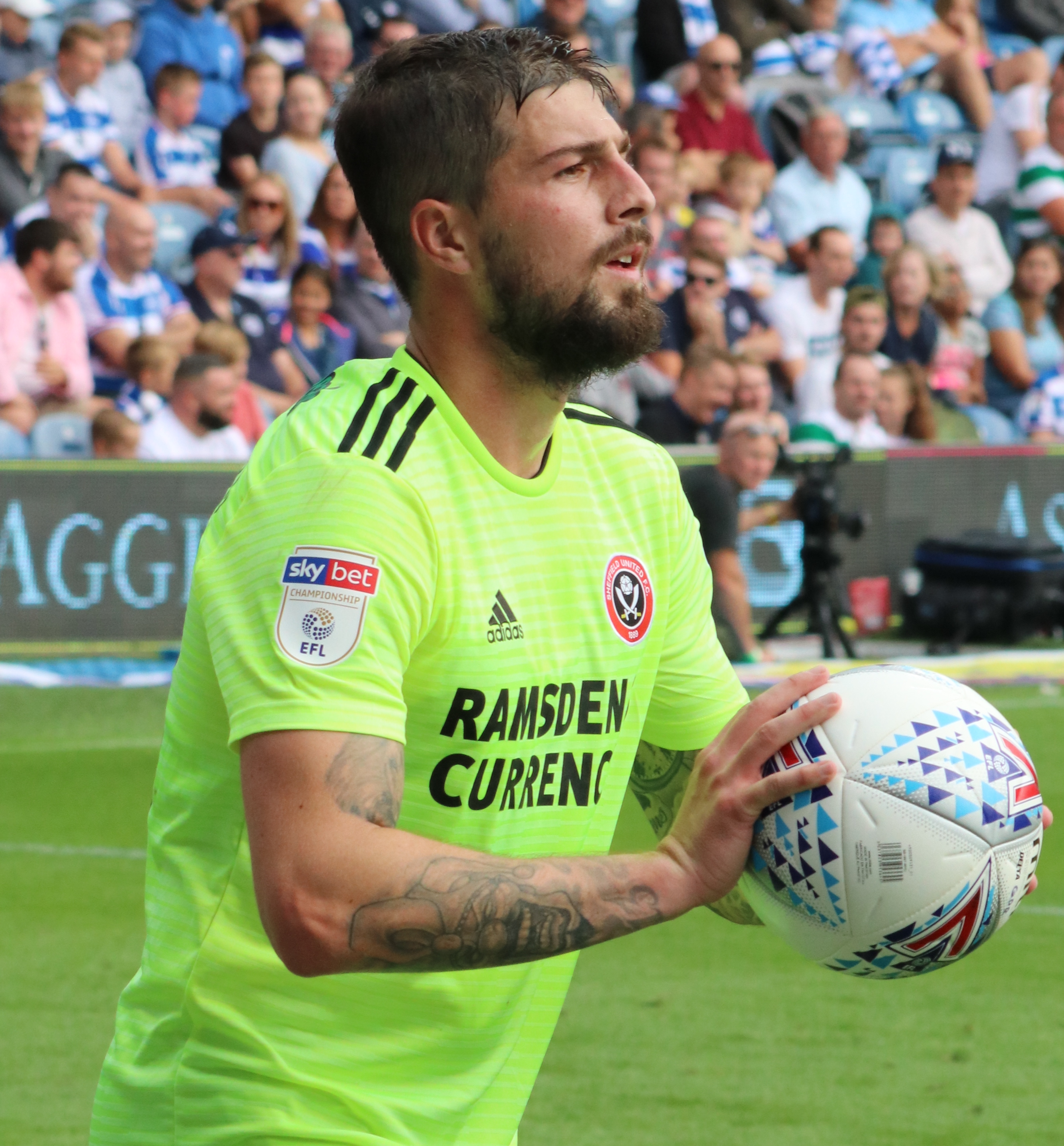
- Freeman playing for Sheffield United in 2018

Personal information
- Full name: Kieron Samuel Freeman
- Date of birth: 21 March 1992 (age 34)
- Place of birth: Arnold, England
- Height: 5 ft 10 in (1.78 m)
- Position: Right-back

Team information
- Current team: Bromsgrove Sporting

Youth career
- –2010: Nottingham Forest

Senior career*
Years	Team	Apps	(Gls)
2010–2012	Nottingham Forest	0	(0)
2011–2012	→ Mansfield Town (loan)	9	(0)
2012	→ Notts County (loan)	19	(1)
2012–2015	Derby County	25	(0)
2013	→ Notts County (loan)	7	(0)
2014	→ Notts County (loan)	9	(0)
2014	→ Sheffield United (loan)	12	(0)
2014–2015	→ Mansfield Town (loan)	11	(0)
2015–2020	Sheffield United	111	(14)
2016	→ Portsmouth (loan)	7	(0)
2021	Swindon Town	2	(0)
2021	Swansea City	0	(0)
2021–2023	Portsmouth	20	(0)
2023–2024	Oldham Athletic	9	(0)
2024	Hartlepool United	7	(0)
2024–2025	Spalding United	27	(2)
2025	Hednesford Town	8	(0)
2026	Alfreton Town	17	(3)
2026–	Bromsgrove Sporting	0	(0)

International career^{‡}
2009	Wales U17	2	(0)
2010–2011	Wales U19	6	(0)
2011–2014	Wales U21	15	(0)
2018	Wales	1	(0)
- * Club domestic league appearances and goals as of 22:47, 18 May 2026 (UTC) ‡ National team caps and goals as of 21:00, 20 November 2018 (UTC)

Kieron Samuel Freeman (born 21 March 1992) is a professional footballer who plays as a right-back for Southern League Premier Division Central club Bromsgrove Sporting. Born in England, he represented the Wales national team.

Starting his career at Nottingham Forest, he then moved to local rivals Derby County for an undisclosed fee. Having played on loan for Mansfield Town and had three separate loan spells at Notts County, he is the youngest player to have played for all three professional Nottinghamshire clubs, and is the first to play for each of the three in consecutive competitive games. He has also spent time on loan at Portsmouth. Freeman has represented Wales at under-17, under-19 and under-21 level.

== Club career ==
=== Nottingham Forest ===
Freeman was a regular for the reserves in the 2010–11 season, and he was named as a substitute by Billy Davies in a Football League Cup first round match with Bradford City in August 2010. In February 2011, Freeman signed a contract at Forest keeping him at the club until the summer of 2013. In the 2011–12 pre-season, Freeman was played in midfield.

Freeman made his first professional appearance for Forest on 22 August 2011 in the second round of the League Cup during a 4–1 victory over Wycombe Wanderers, coming on for Lewis McGugan. His performance resulted in praise from then-Forest manager Steve McClaren.

On 4 November 2011 Freeman joined Conference Premier club Mansfield Town on an emergency loan deal, which was later extended. Freeman returned to Forest on 4 January, having made nine starts for the Stags.

Under Steve Cotterill, Freeman was given his first start for Forest, in an FA Cup third round tie at home to rival club Leicester City in January 2012. He played the whole 90 minutes and helped to keep a clean sheet. The game finished 0–0.

On 13 January 2012 Freeman joined League One side Notts County on an emergency 30-day loan. He was given squad number 20 and made his debut in a 2–1 defeat away to AFC Bournemouth. The loan was extended until the end of the 2011–2012 season on 13 February 2012. After a set of impressive games Kieron was awarded the Football League's Young Player of the Month award for February. He was also praised the current Notts County manager, Keith Curle, who stated that in the future Freeman would be good enough to play in the Premier League. At the end of the season, Freeman returned to Forest, however he has said he'd like to rejoin the Magpies next season.

=== Derby County ===
In the summer of 2012, reports linked Freeman with a return to Notts County and also moves to Derby County and Gillingham. Derby manager Nigel Clough confirmed his interest in signing the player. On 22 August 2012, Freeman joined East Midlands rivals Derby County for an undisclosed fee, signing a two-year contract with an option of a third.

He made his first team debut in a 4–1 win to Blackpool on 3 November 2012, as an 81st minute substitute for Jeff Hendrick. His first start came in a 3–1 win to Middlesbrough on 1 January 2013. After left-back Gareth Roberts received a three-game ban, Freeman was chosen to play at right back for Derby's home games against Wolverhampton Wanderers and Bolton Wanderers, however early into the Bolton game Freeman was stretchered off injured after 29 minutes. Manager Nigel Clough said that Freeman sprained his ankle and had to leave Pride Park on crutches. He was ruled out for three to four weeks. Freeman returned to the first team match day squad after three weeks and a week later returned to starting eleven at right back to cover for the injured John Brayford. In early April it was confirmed that Freeman had extended his contract at Derby through to the summer of 2016. Freeman ended the season featuring 20 times for the first team, starting in 10 matches, along with these appearances Freeman was a regular for the under-21 side and at the end of the season he won the under-21 Player of the Year award.

After the sale of first choice right-back John Brayford to Cardiff City, Nigel Clough thought Freeman would be capable replacement. A couple of days later, Derby signed Tottenham Hotspur right-back Adam Smith on a season-long loan with the intention of the two competing for a place in the starting eleven. Freeman was selected ahead of Smith for the first five league games of the season but was withdrawn at half-time in the fifth game, a home defeat to Burnley. The Rams were 2–0 down at the time and Freeman was at fault for both goals, particularly the second, when he headed the ball into the path of Burnley striker Sam Vokes, who scored from close range. Clough noted that Freeman "should have done better" and Smith started the next game, a 5–1 victory at Millwall, though he was withdrawn after 61 minutes out of concerns for his safety. Millwall were 3–0 down and playing with 10 men and Smith was struck by bottles and coins thrown by the home fans so he was replaced by Freeman. Smith kept his place in the team for the following two matches but Freeman returned for the third, a 2–1 League Cup defeat to rivals Leicester City. Smith was supplanted after Andre Wisdom arrived on loan from Liverpool and Freeman found himself third choice right-back.

Freeman returned to Notts County for a second loan spell on 12 November 2013, making his first appearance as a half-time substitute in a Football League Trophy match on the same day and has since played every minute of Notts County's next four league matches. After making eight appearances in all competitions for Notts County he was recalled from his loan by Derby on 24 December 2013. Freeman returned to Notts County for a third loan spell on 11 January 2014. In March 2014, Freeman linked up with former manager Nigel Clough and joined Sheffield United on an initial one-month loan deal, which after seven appearances for United, was extended until the end of the season. Freeman was used regularly for the remainder of his stay and returned to Derby having made twelve appearances in total for the Blades. On 3 October 2014, Freeman joined former loan club Mansfield Town on a three-month loan deal.

=== Sheffield United ===
On 23 January 2015, after being released by Derby County, Freeman joined former loan club Sheffield United on a free transfer signing a two-and-a-half-year contract with the Blades. Freeman scored his first goal in United colours on 14 March 2015, away at Glanford Park against Scunthorpe United. Freeman was signed for the Blades by Nigel Clough, who left United on 25 May 2015.

Replacement Nigel Adkins would serve as Sheffield United manager for the 2015–16. During Adkins' tenure as Bramall Lane boss, Freeman found himself "out of favour", and on 28 January 2016 he signed on loan for League Two club Portsmouth for the remainder of the 2015–16 season. Upon Freeman's return to United, Adkins had departed the club.

Chris Wilder was installed as manager, and initially transfer listed Freeman. However, Freeman worked his way into the team, becoming "a mainstay of United's starting eleven" as he helped the South Yorkshire side lift the League One trophy, earning with it promotion. On 31 December 2016, in a home game against Northampton Town, Freeman scored the last minute winning goal which took United to the top of the league, where they were to remain for the rest of the season. At the end of the 2016–17 season, Freeman featured in the PFA Team of the Year. In the summer of 2017, Freeman signed a new contract with the now-Championship club.

=== Swindon Town ===
On 7 January 2021, Freeman signed for League One side Swindon Town on a short-term deal until the end of the 2020–21 season.

=== Swansea City ===
On 1 February 2021, Freeman signed for EFL Championship club Swansea City for an undisclosed fee with Swansea winger Jordon Garrick joining Swindon Town on loan as part of the deal. Freeman left the club at the end of the season having made just one appearance in all competitions.

=== Oldham Athletic ===
On 11 August 2023, Freeman joined National League club Oldham Athletic on a short-term six-month contract. Having made ten appearances, he departed the club on 2 January 2024 upon the expiration of his contract.

=== Hartlepool United ===
On 16 August 2024, Freeman joined National League club Hartlepool United on a short-term deal. He made his debut for the club the following day as a late substitute in a 0–0 home draw with Southend United. Having made seven appearances, he departed the club in October 2024 upon the expiration of his contract.

=== Later career ===
On 21 October 2024, Freeman joined Southern League Premier Division Central side Spalding United.

In May 2025, Freeman joined newly promoted Northern Premier League Premier Division side Hednesford Town. Freeman's contract was terminated in November 2025.

In June 2026, Freeman joined Southern League Premier Division Central club Bromsgrove Sporting.

== International career ==
Despite being born in England, Freeman is eligible to represent Wales through his grandparents. Freeman has been capped at under-17, under-19 and under-21 and senior levels. In January 2013 he was selected in the Wales under-21 squad for the friendly match against Iceland on 6 February 2013. On 12 October 2018, Freeman was called up by Wales manager Ryan Giggs to the senior squad for the first time, and made his senior debut on 20 November 2018 from the bench in a friendly away to Albania.

== Personal life ==
Born in Arnold, Nottinghamshire, Freeman attended Arnold Hill Academy.

Freeman is a Nottingham Forest supporter, as is his father, for whom Wes Morgan used to play during his days in Non-League football. Freeman credited former Foresters Morgan, Jermaine Jenas and fellow full-back Stuart Pearce as some of his favourite players growing up.

== Career statistics ==
As of match played 18 April 2026

Appearances and goals by club, season and competition
Club	Season	League			FA Cup		League Cup		Other		Total	
Club	Season	Division	Apps	Goals	Apps	Goals	Apps	Goals	Apps	Goals	Apps	Goals
Nottingham Forest	2011–12	Championship	0	0	1	0	1	0	—		2	0
Mansfield Town (loan)	2011–12	Conference Premier	9	0	—		—		0	0	9	0
Notts County (loan)	2011–12	League One	19	1	—		—		—		19	1
Derby County	2012–13	Championship	19	0	1	0	—		—		20	0
Derby County	2013–14	Championship	6	0	0	0	1	0	—		7	0
Derby County	2014–15	Championship	0	0	0	0	0	0	—		0	0
Derby County	Total		25	0	1	0	1	0	0	0	27	0
Notts County (loan)	2013–14	League One	16	0	—		—		1 (Note: Appearance(s) in Football League Trophy)	0	17	0
Sheffield United (loan)	2013–14	League One	12	0	0	0	—		—		12	0
Mansfield Town (loan)	2014–15	League Two	11	0	0	0	—		—		11	0
Sheffield United	2014–15	League One	19	1	0	0	0	0	2 (Note: Appearance(s) in League One play-offs)	1	21	2
Sheffield United	2015–16	League One	19	0	1	1	1	0	1	0	22	1
Sheffield United	2016–17	League One	41	10	2	1	0	0	3 (Note: Appearances in EFL Trophy)	0	46	11
Sheffield United	2017–18	Championship	10	1	0	0	1	0	—		11	1
Sheffield United	2018–19	Championship	20	2	1	0	1	0	—		22	2
Sheffield United	2019–20	Premier League	2	0	3	0	2	0	—		7	0
Sheffield United	Total		111	14	7	2	5	0	6	1	129	17
Portsmouth (loan)	2015–16	League Two	7	0	—		—		0	0	7	0
Swindon Town	2020–21	League One	2	0	—		—		—		2	0
Swansea City	2020–21	Championship	0	0	1	0	—		0	0	1	0
Portsmouth	2021–22	League One	19	0	1	0	1	0	4	0	25	0
Portsmouth	2022–23	League One	1	0	0	0	1	0	5	0	7	0
Portsmouth	Total		20	0	1	0	2	0	9	0	32	0
Oldham Athletic	2023–24	National League	9	0	1	0	—		0	0	10	0
Hartlepool United	2024–25	National League	7	0	0	0	—		0	0	7	0
Spalding United	2024–25	Southern Premier Division Central	27	2	0	0	—		0	0	27	2
Hednesford Town	2025–26	NPL Premier Division	8	0	3	0	0	0	1	0	12	0
Alfreton Town	2025–26	National League North	17	3	0	0	—		0	0	17	3
Career total			300	20	15	2	9	0	17	1	341	23

== Honours ==
Sheffield United

- EFL League One: 2016–17
- EFL Championship second-place promotion: 2018–19

Individual

- Football League Young Player of the Month: February 2012
- Derby County Under-21 Player of the Year: 2012–13
- PFA Team of the Year: 2016–17 League One
