= Billy Sharp =

English footballer (born 1986)

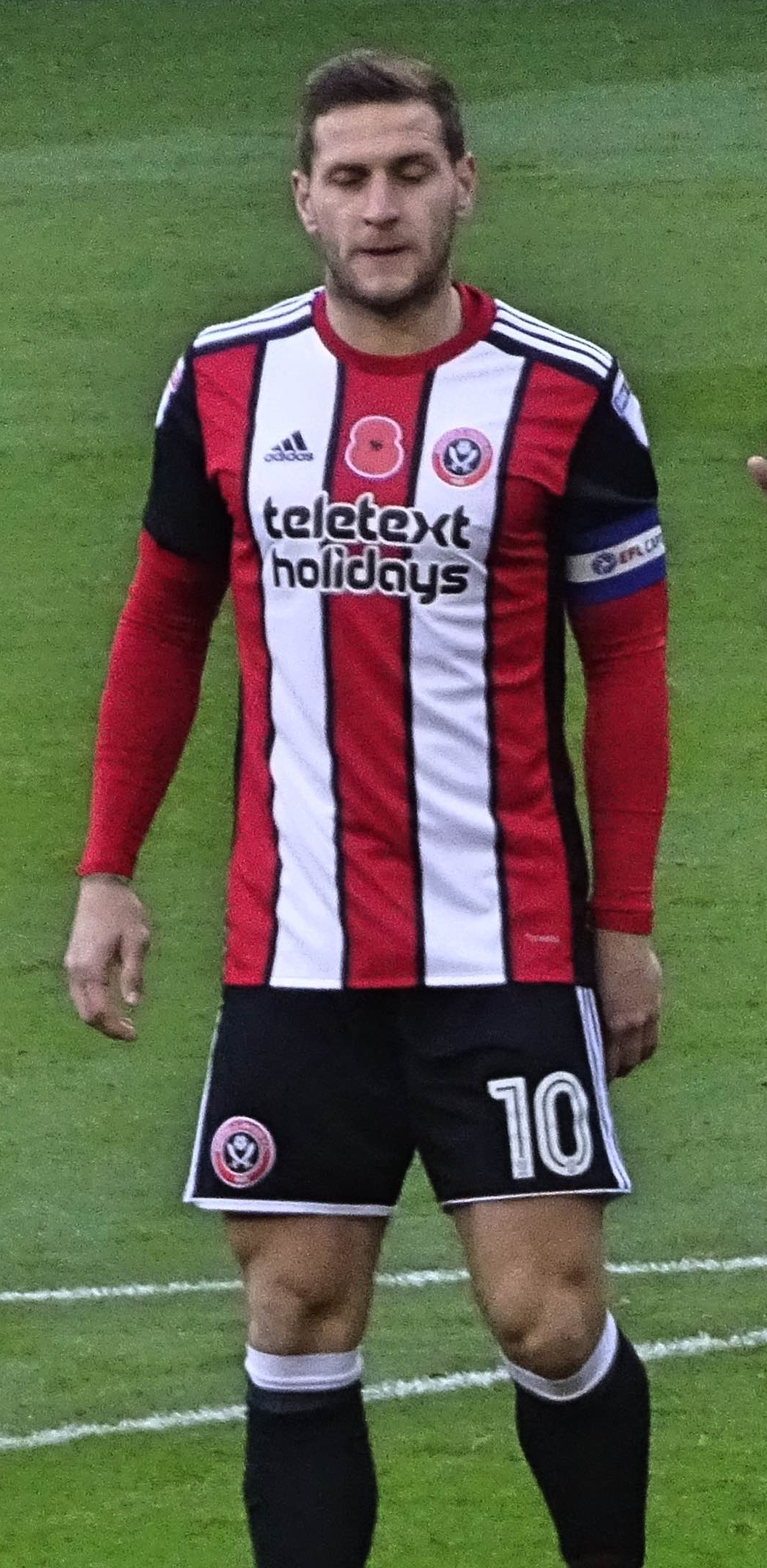
- Sharp with Sheffield United in 2017

Personal information
- Full name: Billy Louis Sharp
- Date of birth: 5 February 1986 (age 40)
- Place of birth: Sheffield, England
- Height: 5 ft 9 in (1.75 m)
- Position: Striker

Team information
- Current team: AFC Rushden & Diamonds

Youth career
- Rotherham United
- –2004: Sheffield United

Senior career*
Years	Team	Apps	(Gls)
2004–2005	Sheffield United	2	(0)
2005	→ Rushden & Diamonds (loan)	16	(9)
2005–2007	Scunthorpe United	82	(53)
2007–2010	Sheffield United	51	(8)
2009–2010	→ Doncaster Rovers (loan)	33	(15)
2010–2012	Doncaster Rovers	49	(25)
2012–2014	Southampton	17	(9)
2012–2013	→ Nottingham Forest (loan)	39	(10)
2013–2014	→ Reading (loan)	10	(2)
2014	→ Doncaster Rovers (loan)	16	(4)
2014–2015	Leeds United	33	(5)
2015–2023	Sheffield United	282	(109)
2023	LA Galaxy	12	(6)
2024	Hull City	11	(0)
2024–2026	Doncaster Rovers	80	(16)
2026–	AFC Rushden & Diamonds	0	(0)
Total		733	(271)
- * Club domestic league appearances and goals

Billy Louis Sharp (born 5 February 1986) is an English professional footballer who plays as a striker for Northern Premier League Division One Midlands club AFC Rushden & Diamonds.

Sharp played for Sheffield United, Rushden & Diamonds, Scunthorpe United, Southampton, Nottingham Forest, Reading, Doncaster Rovers and Leeds United. On 1 January 2019, Sharp scored his 220th goal and became the leading English goal scorer in English professional football during the 21st century, overtaking the record set by Rickie Lambert. On 8 February 2019, Sharp scored his 100th goal in all competitions for Sheffield United when he scored his second goal in a 3–3 draw against Aston Villa.

Two days after the death of his newborn son in 2011, Sharp played and scored the opener in the game against Middlesbrough, and five days later he was applauded by Ipswich Town fans following his goal against them. He and his wife set up The Luey Jacob Sharp Foundation in aid of gastroschisis research and to support other people affected by this condition.

== Club career ==
=== Early career ===
Born in Sheffield, South Yorkshire, Sharp played for Middlewood Rovers as a young player. He began his career with the youth teams of Rotherham United and Sheffield United, before making his first-team debut for Sheffield United during the 2004–05 season. He joined Rushden & Diamonds on loan in January 2005, scoring 9 goals in 16 games for the club, before moving to Scunthorpe United in 2005.

=== Scunthorpe United ===
Sharp joined Scunthorpe on a permanent deal in 2005 for a fee of £100,000. During the 2005–06 season, Sharp was noted for his partnership with striker Andy Keogh, on loan from Leeds United. Keogh and Sharp became part of the most potent strike-force in League One, scoring 38 goals between them, Sharp scoring 23 goals, with Keogh netting 15 of them.

Sharp netted 30 times in the league in the 2006–07 season guiding his team to promotion into the Championship. This was the highest total in the 4 leagues of England. He scored a header in the televised defeat to Aston Villa, which only served to enhance his reputation across the nation. In all, he scored 56 goals in 95 games for Scunthorpe during his two seasons at Glanford Park.

With his goalscoring feats in the 2006–07 season, there was predictable interest from other clubs in Sharp, and a number of clubs made bids for the striker as the season ended.

=== Return to Sheffield United ===
Ultimately, Sharp rejoined Sheffield United on 4 July 2007 for a fee of around £2 million, a deal that also saw Sheffield United's Jonathan Forte transferred to Scunthorpe.

Sharp made his full Sheffield United first team debut in the opening game of the 2007–08 season, a 2–2 draw with Colchester United. He scored his first competitive goals for the club in September, scoring two against Morecambe in a 5–0 third round League Cup victory but had to wait until March to score his first league goal, in a 2–1 win at home against Coventry City. After finally breaking his duck he went on to score three more times before the end of the season.

Sharp started the 2008–09 season brightly, scoring a perfect hat-trick (header, right foot, left foot) in the Blades' first home game, against Queens Park Rangers. He scored the equaliser in a 1–1 home draw to Coventry a few weeks later, but that proved to be his last league goal of the season. Sharp did score twice more in the FA Cup including a goal against Hull City during a fifth-round replay. During the same game, Sharp was incorrectly booked for diving by referee Peter Walton who later apologised for his mistake. With the club rebuilding the team following their failure to gain promotion, Sharp was placed on the transfer list in July 2009.

=== Doncaster Rovers ===
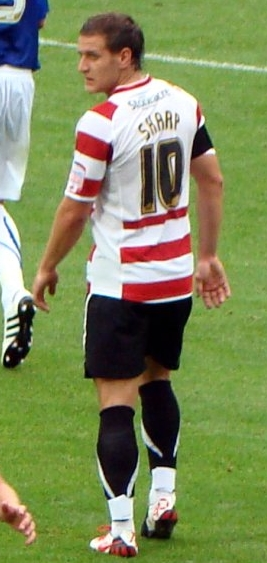
Sharp playing for Doncaster Rovers in 2010

Sharp signed a season-long loan with Championship club Doncaster Rovers on 1 September 2009. He was given the number 5 for the season, an unusual choice for a striker. He made his debut on 12 September against Reading, he scored his first goal just two games later against former club, Scunthorpe United. With ten goals in seventeen games, meant interest came in from a number of clubs, and Sheffield United would allow the striker to move away during the January transfer market, with both Doncaster Rovers and fellow Championship club Barnsley reported to be looking to sign the striker. Near the end of the season, a knee injury stopped Sharp's season but he still managed to finish with 15 goals in 33 league games.

During the summer transfer window, Sheffield United rejected an initial bid of what was thought to be £1 million from Doncaster on 20 May, but they hadn't given up hope of signing the striker. On 29 June, Sharp rejected a move to relegated Premier League side Burnley, despite the £1 million being accepted by United. Sharp finally signed for Doncaster Rovers on 7 July 2010 for £1.15 million, beating their record fee of £300,000 for Matt Mills from Manchester City. Sharp signed a three-year contract, which kept him at Keepmoat Stadium till the summer of 2013.

Sharp made his second debut on 7 August, scoring in his first game back against Preston North End. Sharp also managed to score against another of his former clubs, Sheffield United in a 2–0 victory for Rovers, but was forced off in the first half with a hamstring problem. It was later confirmed that he would be out for at least six weeks. In his return, against Leicester City, Sharp managed to score a six-minute opener at the Walkers Stadium. On 3 March 2011, Sharp told BBC Radio that he would need a hernia operation but would try to hold it till the end of the season so that he could reach a 20-goal milestone. Despite failing to reach this milestone, bids still came in for Sharp in the summer window, Doncaster rejected two bids, £2.3 million from Ipswich Town. Shortly after Southampton put a bid in for £3.25 million which Sharp himself rejected.

On 2 November 2011, three days following the death of his two-day-old son Luey Jacob, Sharp netted a volley to open the scoring against Middlesbrough in the 14th minute. He celebrated by taking off his jersey, unveiling an undershirt that read "THAT'S FOR YOU SON" and was not awarded the usual yellow card by referee Darren Deadman for his emotional celebration. Doncaster lost the game to Middlesbrough 3–1. Sharp scored another goal on 7 November in his side's 3–2 win against Ipswich Town at Portman Road. The home fans even had a standing ovation and applauded Sharp as he celebrated his goal, with the player later stating that the gesture brought a smile to him. On 3 January 2012, Barnsley fans were accused of making vile chants about the death of Sharp's son as Doncaster beat Barnsley 2–0, though Barnsley director Don Rowing said it was untrue, and attributed it to rumourmongers on Twitter.

Doncaster agreed an undisclosed fee with Championship rivals Leicester City for Sharp on 7 January, after rejecting a bid days before from an unnamed club. Despite agreeing this fee, Doncaster offered Sharp a new deal which was said to be the most lucrative deal in their history. Following a goalless draw with Cardiff City, Rovers boss Dean Saunders said that Sharp had rejected the move to Leicester.

=== Southampton ===
On 30 January 2012, Sharp signed for Southampton on a 3 1/2-year deal for an undisclosed fee rumoured to be around £1.8m. Sharp scored his first goal for Southampton on his home debut in a 2–0 win over Burnley on 11 February 2012. He then scored twice in a 2–0 victory over former club Doncaster Rovers on 24 March. On 7 April he played in his first South Coast derby, and scored twice as Southampton drew 2–2 with Portsmouth at St Mary's Stadium. He scored his first two away goals for the club in a 3–1 victory at Peterborough United on 17 April. He finished the season with 19 goals, after deflecting a shot from Adam Lallana against Coventry City, helping Southampton secure their return to the Premier League as runners-up.

His first goal of the 2012–13 season came in a 4–1 victory at Stevenage in the League Cup.

==== Nottingham Forest loan ====
On 31 August 2012, Sharp joined Nottingham Forest on loan for the remainder of the 2012–13 season. He made his Nottingham Forest debut as a substitute on 1 September 2012 against Charlton Athletic at the City Ground. His first goal for Forest came on 20 October 2012 in a 3–1 win over Cardiff City. In total he scored 11 goals in 40 games whilst at Nottingham Forest, finishing the season as the club's top scorer.

==== Reading loan ====
On 26 September 2013, Sharp joined Reading on an emergency loan deal, linking up with former manager Nigel Adkins. Sharp scored his first goal for Reading on 3 December 2013 in their 1–0 home victory over Charlton Athletic. Sharp returned to Southampton on 2 January following the completion of his loan, he'd scored twice in ten games for the club.

==== Return to Doncaster Rovers (loan) ====
On 22 January 2014, Sharp re-joined his former club Doncaster Rovers on loan for the remainder of the 2013–14 season. On his debut at Blackpool on 25 January, he scored in the 85th minute to earn the visitors a point. On 8 February, Sharp was sent off in the match at Brighton for a foul on Gordon Greer. A month later, Sharp returned from suspension and scored against Huddersfield Town. Sharp was unable to help keep Doncaster in the division as they were relegated to League One.

=== Leeds United ===
On 13 August 2014, Sharp returned to Yorkshire and joined Leeds United on a two-year contract. The transfer fee paid to Southampton was reported as £600,000.

He made his debut on 16 August, scoring a late winner on debut in a 1–0 victory over Middlesbrough to earn Dave Hockaday his first victory as Leeds Head Coach. On 20 December, Sharp scored his second goal for Leeds in a 1–1 draw against his former club Nottingham Forest. Sharp scored a 90th-minute winner Leeds in a 2–1 win over West Yorkshire rivals Huddersfield Town on 31 January 2015. On 28 February 2015, Sharp scored for Leeds in a 3–2 defeat against Watford.

On 23 July 2015, after he was dropped from their pre-season friendly against Eintracht Frankfurt, Leeds United sent Sharp home from their summer training camp in Austria in anticipation of a transfer back to Sheffield United.

=== Second return to Sheffield United ===
On 25 July 2015, Sharp completed a return to Sheffield United for an undisclosed fee. In the 2015–16 season, Sharp averaged more than one goal every two matches for United, scoring 21 goals in 39 games.

Following Chris Wilder's arrival as the new Blades manager on 12 May 2016, Sharp was appointed club captain. Sharp scored his 50th career goal for Sheffield United on 26 December 2016 in a 2–0 home victory over Oldham Athletic.

In April 2017, in United's 3–0 victory at MK Dons, Sharp scored twice to take his career goals tally to 201. In the summer of 2017, Sharp penned a new two-year contract at his boyhood club, having skippered them to promotion back to the Championship.

On 1 January 2019, Sharp scored his 220th goal and became the leading goalscorer in English league football during the 21st century overtaking the record set by Rickie Lambert. A further contract extension was automatically triggered on 12 January, after playing his 23rd game of the season, keeping him at the club until 2020. On 8 February 2019, Sharp scored his 100th goal in all competitions for Sheffield United when he scored his second goal in a 3–3 draw against Aston Villa. In March 2019, he was selected to the 2018–19 Championship Team of the Season. On 28 April, Sharp saw United promoted to the Premier League for the first time since 2007.

On 10 August 2019, Sharp marked Sheffield United's return to the Premier League with an 88th-minute equaliser in a 1–1 draw at AFC Bournemouth, his first goal in the English top flight.

On 10 June 2020, Sharp signed a new two-year contract keeping him at the club until the summer of 2022.

On 12 January 2021, Sharp scored his 100th league goal for Sheffield United via a penalty in a 1–0 home league win over Newcastle United. This result earned the Blades' their first league victory of the season and their first league win since July 2020.

On 17 May 2022, Sheffield United were knocked out of the 2022 Championship play-off semi-final by Nottingham Forest. During a pitch invasion by Forest supporters at the end of the match, Sharp who had not played in the game was standing at the side of the pitch and was headbutted and knocked to the ground. He required stitches in a wound. A man was later arrested for the attack. The following day, a 30-year-old man was charged with assault occasioning actual bodily harm and going on to the playing area at a football match. On 19 May he pleaded guilty to assault occasioning actual bodily harm at Nottingham Magistrates' Court and was jailed for 24 weeks. He was also ordered to pay £500 compensation to Sharp, and £128 in court costs and was given a two-year football banning order. Following the assault, in just 4 days Nottingham Forest fans raised over £15,000 to a Just Giving fundraiser to show their condemnation at the attack and register support for their former player. Following contact with Sharp's representative, Martin House Children's Hospice was nominated as the charity to receive the funds.

Following a 3–1 win against Wrexham in the FA Cup, Sharp called the referee "biased" and said that the referee was "on Wrexham's side". Later that month, the FA charged Sharp with improper conduct. He was fined £2,500.

Sharp was released by Sheffield United at the end of the 2022–23 season.

=== LA Galaxy ===
On 15 August 2023, Sharp signed for Major League Soccer club LA Galaxy on a short two-month deal with the option of a one-year extension. He debuted for the Galaxy on 26 August 2023, entering the game in the 69th minute, Sharp converted a late penalty for his first goal as a Galaxy player.

Sharp scored his first hat-trick as a Galaxy player on 20 September 2023, in a 4–3 comeback win against Minnesota United.

On 10 November 2023, LA Galaxy declined his contract after the conclusion of the 2023 season.

=== Hull City ===
On 20 December 2023, Hull City announced that a deal had been agreed to sign Sharp from 1 January 2024 on a short-term deal until the end of the 2023–24 season. He made his debut from the bench as a replacement for Jason Lokilo on 6 January 2024, in the FA Cup Third round home match in a 1–1 draw against Birmingham City.

On 19 May 2024, the club announced he would leave the club in the summer when his contract expired.

=== Second return to Doncaster Rovers ===
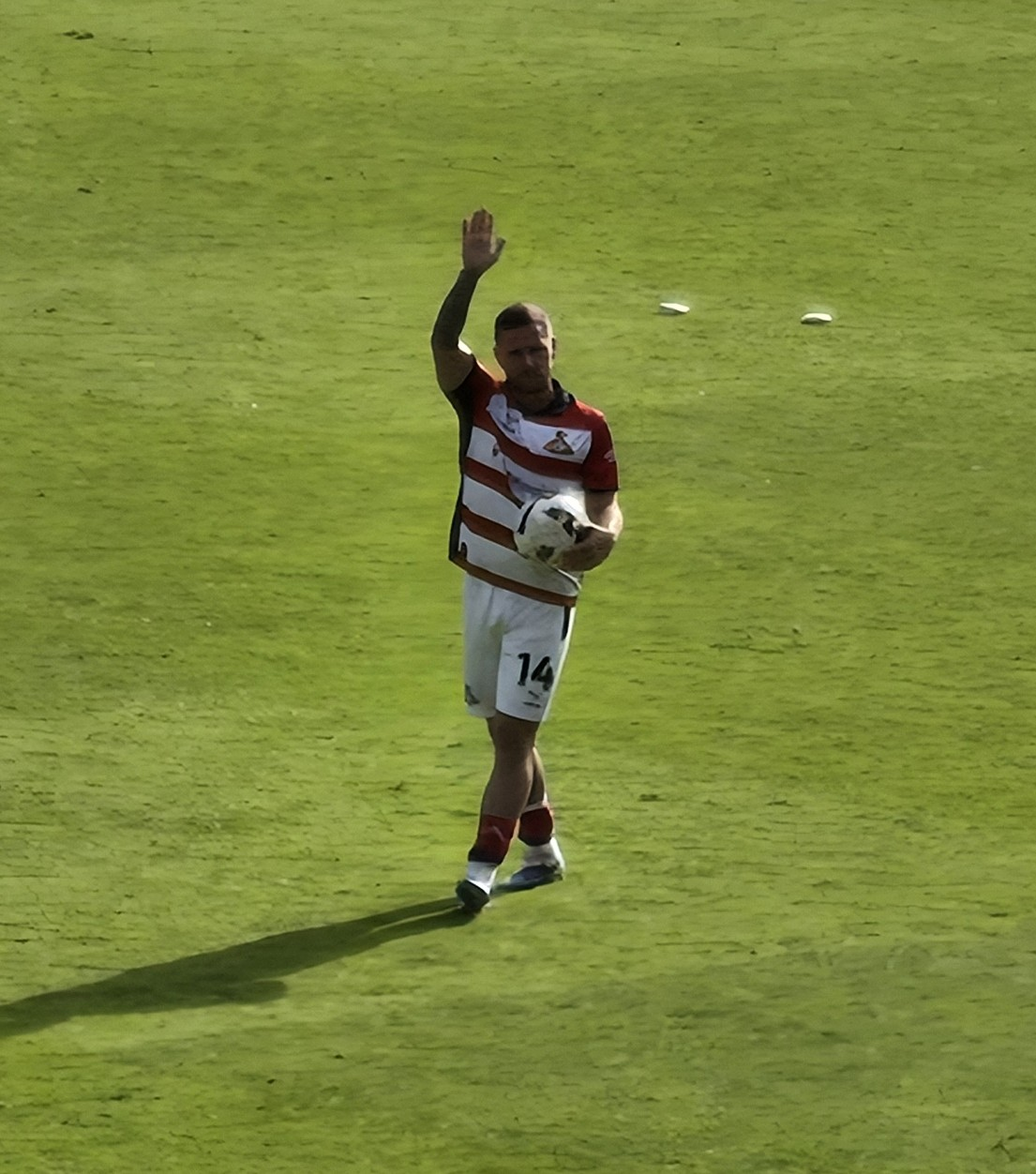
Sharp playing for Doncaster Rovers in 2026

On 24 June 2024, it was announced that Sharp had signed a one-year deal at Doncaster Rovers and returned after 10 years.

Sharp made his second debut for Doncaster in the opening match of the 2024–25 EFL League Two season, in a 4–1 win against Accrington Stanley on 10 August 2024 and scoring on his first appearance, marking his first goal of the campaign.

Sharp featured as a key veteran presence in the 2024–25 campaign. On 26 April 2025, Sharp scored a dramatic late winner against Bradford City, scoring in stoppage time to secure a 2–1 victory that clinched Doncaster’s promotion to EFL League One

On 20 May 2025, the club announced the player has signed a new one-year deal.

In the 2025–26 season, Sharp continued with Doncaster in EFL League One. He made regular appearances, often contributing off the bench and adding experience to the club’s attacking options. Across league and cup competitions, Sharp scored 6 goals and recorded 1 assist in 15 starts, with additional substitute appearances.

On 2 December 2025 Sharp recorded his first career hat‑trick for Doncaster Rovers, netting three goals in a 5–1 win over Chesterfield in the EFL Trophy, his first in a Rovers shirt across his multiple spells at the club. During this season, Sharp also reached a personal milestone, making his 700th career league appearance in English football in November 2025 against Lincoln City. He became only the fourth player since 2004–05 to surpass 700 appearances across the top four tiers of the English Football League.

On 22 April 2026, it was announced that their fixture three days later would be Sharp's final home appearance for the club. In this fixture, he scored his side's equaliser in a 1–1 draw with Stevenage having come on as a half-time substitute.

On 2 May 2026, Sharp made his last appearance for Doncaster against Peterborough United, where he scored a hat-trick. Sharp did score a fourth goal, which would have taken him to 300 career goals, however this was ruled offside. Including his three-goal haul against Peterborough, Sharp notched hat-tricks in the English Football League in his teens, 20s, 30s and 40s.

On 11 October 2026, Sharp announced his retirement from professional football.

=== AFC Rushden & Diamonds ===
On 1 November 2026, AFC Rushden & Diamonds announced Sharp had joined the club, 21 years after playing for their predecessor club, in order to play in their FA Cup first round tie against Burton Albion, following the suspension of James Clifton.

== Personal life ==
Sharp's son, Luey Jacob, died in October 2011 from gastroschisis when he was just two days old.

Sharp scored a goal against Middlesbrough just two days after the death, and again five days later at Ipswich. Notable tributes included: the Middlesbrough manager, Tony Mowbray, said he was delighted Sharp had scored and called the goal against his club "A goal from heaven"; the Ipswich Town fans applauded him on scoring against them and chanted Luey's name; the Sheffield United fans gave applause for him in the 24th minute (Sharp's club number at United was 24) in an away game at Stevenage; Derby County players wore black armbands in their game against Cardiff City.

Along with his partner Jade Fair, Sharp set up The Luey Jacob Sharp Foundation, a charity with the aim of raising money for research into gastroschisis and a support network for families affected by the condition.

In December 2012, Sharp's partner Jade gave birth to their second son, Leo.

In December 2015, Sharp's third child, a son named Milo Thomas, was born.

== Career statistics ==
Appearances and goals by club, season and competition
Club	Season	League			FA Cup		League Cup		Other		Total	
Club	Season	Division	Apps	Goals	Apps	Goals	Apps	Goals	Apps	Goals	Apps	Goals
Sheffield United	2004–05	Championship	2	0	0	0	0	0	—		2	0
Sheffield United	2005–06	Championship	0	0	—		—		—		0	0
Sheffield United	Total		2	0	0	0	0	0	—		2	0
Rushden & Diamonds (loan)	2004–05	League Two	16	9	—		—		—		16	9
Scunthorpe United	2005–06	League One	37	23	4	0	2	0	2 (Note: Appearances in Football League Trophy)	1	45	24
Scunthorpe United	2006–07	League One	45	30	3	1	2	1	0	0	50	32
Scunthorpe United	Total		82	53	7	1	4	1	2	1	95	56
Sheffield United	2007–08	Championship	29	4	4	0	3	2	—		36	6
Sheffield United	2008–09	Championship	22	4	4	2	1	0	0	0	27	6
Sheffield United	2009–10	Championship	0	0	—		1	1	—		1	1
Sheffield United	Total		51	8	8	2	5	3	0	0	64	13
Doncaster Rovers (loan)	2009–10	Championship	33	15	2	0	—		—		35	15
Doncaster Rovers	2010–11	Championship	29	15	2	1	0	0	—		31	16
Doncaster Rovers	2011–12	Championship	20	10	0	0	0	0	—		20	10
Doncaster Rovers	Total		82	40	4	1	0	0	—		86	41
Southampton	2011–12	Championship	15	9	0	0	—		—		15	9
Southampton	2012–13	Premier League	2	0	—		1	1	—		3	1
Southampton	2013–14	Premier League	0	0	0	0	0	0	—		0	0
Southampton	Total		17	9	0	0	1	1	—		18	10
Nottingham Forest (loan)	2012–13	Championship	39	10	1	1	—		—		40	11
Reading (loan)	2013–14	Championship	10	2	—		—		—		10	2
Doncaster Rovers (loan)	2013–14	Championship	16	4	—		—		—		16	4
Leeds United	2014–15	Championship	33	5	1	0	1	0	—		35	5
Sheffield United	2015–16	League One	44	21	2	0	0	0	2	0	48	21
Sheffield United	2016–17	League One	46	30	1	0	1	0	1 (Note: Appearance in EFL Trophy)	0	49	30
Sheffield United	2017–18	Championship	34	13	2	1	1	0	—		37	14
Sheffield United	2018–19	Championship	40	23	1	0	1	1	—		42	24
Sheffield United	2019–20	Premier League	25	3	3	1	1	0	—		29	4
Sheffield United	2020–21	Premier League	16	3	2	2	1	0	—		19	5
Sheffield United	2021–22	Championship	39	14	1	0	2	1	—		42	15
Sheffield United	2022–23	Championship	38	2	6	1	1	0	—		45	3
Sheffield United	Total		282	109	18	5	8	2	3	0	311	116
LA Galaxy	2023	MLS	12	6	—		—		—		12	6
Hull City	2023–24	Championship	11	0	2	0	—		—		13	0
Doncaster Rovers	2024–25	League Two	43	9	4	2	2	1	2	0	51	12
Doncaster Rovers	2025–26	League One	37	7	3	1	1	0	4	6	45	14
Doncaster Rovers	Total		80	16	7	3	3	1	6	6	96	26
AFC Rushden & Diamonds	2026-27	Northern Premier League Division One Midlands	0	0	1	0	0	0	0	0	1	0
Career total			733	271	49	13	22	8	11	7	815	299

== Honours ==
Scunthorpe United

- Football League One: 2006–07

Southampton

- Football League Championship second-place promotion: 2011–12

Sheffield United

- EFL Championship second-place promotion: 2018–19, 2022–23
- EFL League One: 2016–17

Doncaster Rovers

- EFL League Two: 2024–25

Individual

- PFA Team of the Year: 2005–06 League One, 2006–07 League One, 2016–17 League One, 2018–19 Championship
- PFA Fans' Player of the Year: 2006–07 League One
- Football League One Player of the Year: 2006–07, 2016–17
- Doncaster Rovers Player of the Year: 2010–11
- Sheffield United Player of the Year: 2015–16, 2016–17
- EFL Team of the Season: 2016–17, 2018–19
