= Nathan Thomas (footballer) =

English footballer (born 1994)

Personal information
- Full name: Nathan Thomas
- Date of birth: 27 September 1994 (age 32)
- Place of birth: Ingleby Barwick, England
- Position: Left winger

Youth career
- Newcastle United
- 2011–2012: Sunderland

Senior career*
Years	Team	Apps	(Gls)
2012–2013	Sunderland	0	(0)
2012	→ Darlington 1883 (loan)	3	(0)
2013	Darlington 1883	4	(0)
2013–2015	Plymouth Argyle	19	(1)
2015	Motherwell	2	(0)
2015–2016	Mansfield Town	17	(1)
2016–2017	Hartlepool United	55	(14)
2017–2020	Sheffield United	1	(0)
2018	→ Shrewsbury Town (loan)	11	(2)
2018–2019	→ Notts County (loan)	25	(1)
2019	→ Carlisle United (loan)	16	(4)
2019	→ Gillingham (loan)	0	(0)
2019–2020	→ Carlisle United (loan)	33	(5)
2020–2021	Hamilton Academical	10	(0)
2022–2023	York City	11	(0)
2023	Marske United	10	(4)
2023–2025	Whitby Town	43	(12)
2025	Bishop Auckland	1	(1)
- * Club domestic league appearances and goals as of 19:41, 21 May 2026 (UTC)

Nathan Thomas (born 27 September 1994) is a professional footballer who plays as a winger.

== Playing career ==
=== Sunderland ===
Thomas served as an apprentice at Sunderland after leaving Newcastle United in 2011, and played in December 2012 one month on loan for Darlington 1883. After his loan return from Darlington, he played until May 2013 and then left Sunderland after refusing a new contract.

=== Plymouth Argyle ===
He was signed by Plymouth Argyle until the end of the 2013–14 season by manager John Sheridan in December 2013. He made his debut in the Football League on 29 December, replacing Lewis Alessandra 81 minutes into a 1–1 draw with AFC Wimbledon at Kingsmeadow. He scored his first competitive goal for Plymouth Argyle in a 2–0 victory against Hartlepool United in League Two on 20 September 2014.

=== Motherwell ===
On 2 February 2015, Thomas signed for Scottish Premiership club Motherwell.

=== Hartlepool United ===
On 12 January 2016, Thomas signed for League Two club Hartlepool United from Mansfield Town. On Thomas' debut, he assisted the winner for Scott Fenwick in a 1–0 win against Wycombe Wanderers. In September 2016, Thomas scored all five of Hartlepool's goals that month. His goal in a 3–0 victory against Grimsby Town was voted as Hartlepool United's goal of the decade. It was also nominated as the Sky Bet EFL goal of the month for November 2016. Following Hartlepool's relegation to the National League, Thomas attracted interest from Middlesbrough and Leeds United.

=== Sheffield United ===
On 15 May 2017, Thomas joined Championship side Sheffield United on a three-year deal. He scored his first goal for Sheffield United on his debut in a 3–2 EFL Cup win against Walsall on 9 August 2017.

He was transfer-listed by Sheffield United at the end of the 2017–18 season. On 3 July 2018, he signed for EFL League Two side Notts County on a season-long loan.

Thomas then cancelled his loan at Notts by mutual consent on 29 January, before later signing on loan with Carlisle United until the end of the 2018–19 season.

Prior to the 2019–20 season, Thomas signed a season-long loan with Gillingham, however the loan was terminated during pre-season, reportedly because Thomas and his family could not settle in the south. Instead he began a second loan spell with Carlisle United.

=== Hamilton Academical ===
On 6 November 2020, Thomas signed for Scottish Premiership side Hamilton Academical. On 19 May 2021 it was announced that he would leave Hamilton at the end of the season, following the expiry of his contract.

=== York City ===
On 6 October 2022, Thomas returned to football when he joined National League club York City on a short-term contract until January 2023. He scored a brace in a 5–0 win against Blyth Spartans in the FA Trophy. On 30 December 2022, Thomas extended his contract until the end of the season. He was released at the end of the season, however was invited back for pre-season.

=== Marske United ===
On 30 July 2023, Thomas signed for Marske United. Thomas scored a penalty for the Seasiders on his league debut against Ilkeston Town.

=== Whitby Town ===
Having left Marske United by mutual consent, Thomas joined Whitby Town in December 2023.

== Career statistics ==
As of match played 25 August 2025

Club	Season	League			National Cup		League Cup		Other		Total	
Club	Season	Division	Apps	Goals	Apps	Goals	Apps	Goals	Apps	Goals	Apps	Goals
Plymouth Argyle	2013–14	League Two	10	0	2	0	0	0	0	0	12	0
Plymouth Argyle	2014–15	League Two	9	1	1	0	0	0	2 (Note: Appearance(s) in Football League Trophy)	0	12	1
Plymouth Argyle	Total		19	1	3	0	0	0	2	0	24	1
Motherwell	2014–15	Scottish Premiership	2	0	0	0	0	0	0	0	2	0
Mansfield Town	2015–16	League Two	17	1	2	0	1	0	1	0	21	1
Hartlepool United	2015–16	League Two	22	5	0	0	0	0	0	0	22	5
Hartlepool United	2016–17	League Two	33	9	0	0	1	0	0	0	34	9
Hartlepool United	Total		55	14	0	0	1	0	0	0	56	14
Sheffield United	2017–18	Championship	1	0	1	1	1	1	—		3	2
Sheffield United	2018–19	Championship	0	0	0	0	0	0	—		0	0
Sheffield United	2019–20	Premier League	0	0	0	0	0	0	—		0	0
Sheffield United	Total		1	0	1	1	1	1	0	0	3	2
Shrewsbury Town (loan)	2017–18	League One	11	2	0	0	0	0	2	0	13	2
Notts County (loan)	2018–19	League Two	25	1	1	0	0	0	3	0	29	1
Carlisle United (loan)	2018–19	League Two	16	4	0	0	0	0	0	0	16	4
Gillingham (loan)	2019–20	League One	0	0	0	0	0	0	0	0	0	0
Carlisle United (loan)	2019–20	League Two	33	5	5	3	2	1	1	0	41	9
Hamilton Academical	2020–21	Scottish Premiership	10	0	0	0	1	0	—		11	0
York City	2022–23	National League	11	0	1	0	—		2 (Note: Appearance(s) in FA Trophy)	2	14	2
Marske United	2023–24	Northern Premier League Premier Division	10	4	1	0	—		1	0	12	4
Whitby Town	2023–24	Northern Premier League Premier Division	20	5	0	0	—		1	1	21	6
Whitby Town	2024–25	Northern Premier League Premier Division	23	7	1	0	—		1	0	25	7
Whitby Town	Total		43	12	1	0	0	0	2	1	46	13
Bishop Auckland	2025–26	Northern Premier League East Division	1	1	0	0	—		1	0	2	1
Career total			254	45	15	4	6	2	15	3	290	54

== Honours ==
Shrewsbury Town

- EFL Trophy runner-up: 2017–18
