= Scott Duncan (referee) =

English football referee

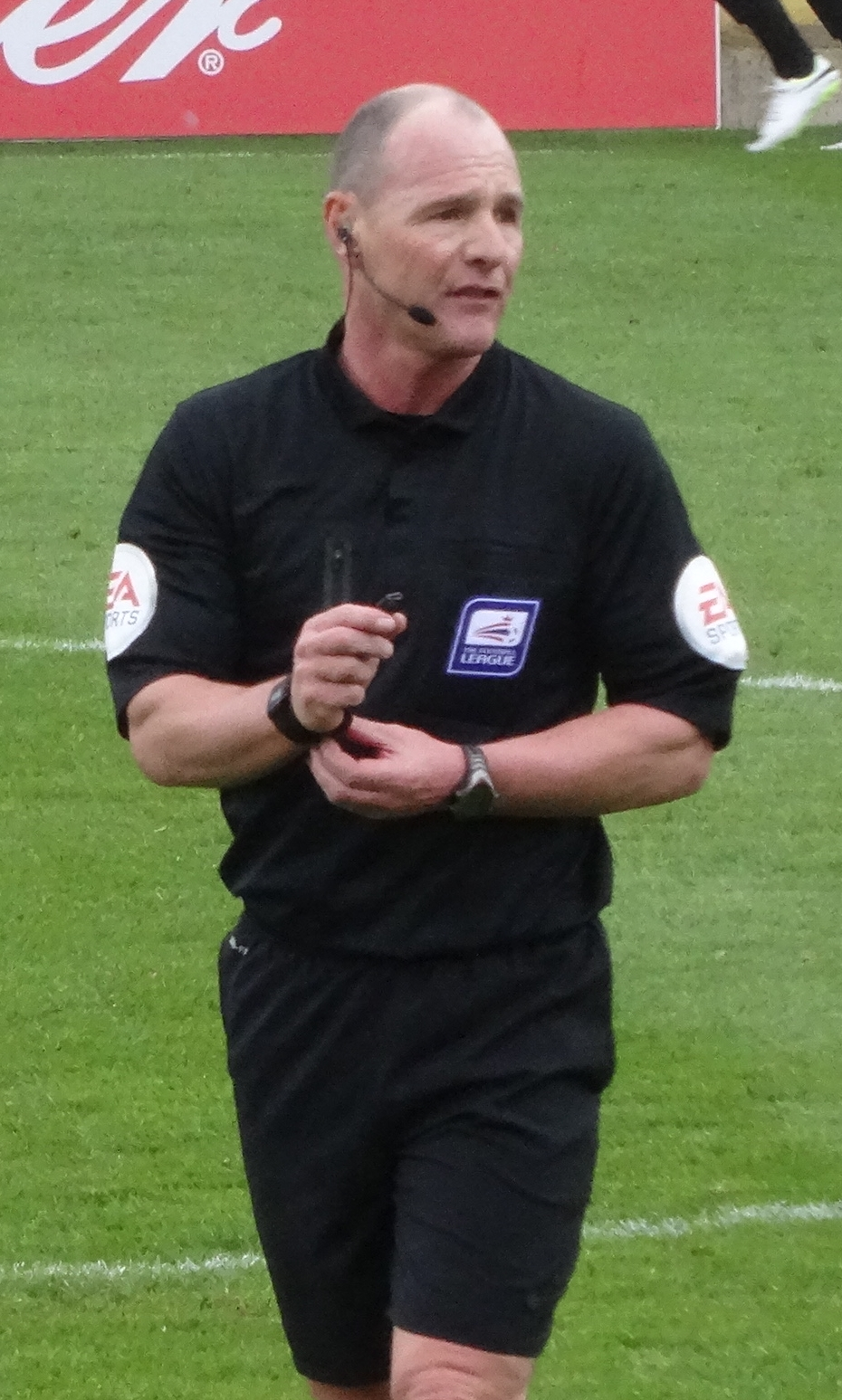
- Duncan refereeing in 2014
- Born: Newcastle upon Tyne, England

Domestic
Years	League	Role
2008–2012	Football Conference	Referee
2010–2012	The Football League	Assistant referee
2012–2020	The Football League	Referee

Scott Duncan is an English former association football referee who officiated in the Football League. He first refereed in the Football Conference in 2008, and became an assistant referee in the Football League two years later. Duncan began refereeing in the Football League in 2012 when he was promoted to the National List.

== Career ==
Duncan was born in Newcastle upon Tyne, Tyne and Wear, and is a member of the Northumberland Football Association (NFA). He first officiated at Football Conference level when he refereed a 1–1 draw between York City and Barrow at Bootham Crescent in the Conference Premier on 25 August 2008. Duncan first acted as an assistant referee in the Football League on 7 August 2010 for Derby County's 2–1 win over Leeds United at Elland Road in a Championship match. He combined refereeing Football Conference matches and assisting Football League matches in the 2010–11 and 2011–12 seasons, before being promoted to the National List for 2012–13.

Duncan's first match as a Football League referee was in League Two on 18 August 2012, when Port Vale beat Barnet 3–0 at Vale Park. He first refereed a Championship match when Watford beat Huddersfield Town 4–0 at Vicarage Road on 19 January 2013. He refereed the second leg of the League Two play-off semi-final between Fleetwood Town and York City at Highbury Stadium on 16 May 2014, which the home team drew 0–0 to progress to the final 1–0 on aggregate. In November 2014, Duncan resigned as the NFA's referee coach. Earlier, Michael Oliver had resigned as NFA vice president.
