= 2011–12 Hartlepool United F.C. season =

Hartlepool United F.C.
2011–12 season
- Owner: IOR
- Chairman: Ken Hodcroft
- Manager: Mick Wadsworth (until 6 December); Neale Cooper (from 28 December)
- Stadium: Victoria Park
- League One: 13th
- FA Cup: First round (Eliminated by Stevenage)
- League Cup: First round (Eliminated by Sheffield United)
- Football League Trophy: First Round (Eliminated by Scunthorpe United)
- Top goalscorer: League: Antony Sweeney (8); All: Antony Sweeney (9)
- Highest home attendance: 6,800 (vs Sheffield Wednesday)
- Lowest home attendance: 2,744 (vs Stevenage)
- Average home league attendance: 4,960
- Biggest win: 4–0 (vs. Sheffield Wednesday)
- Biggest defeat: 5–0 (vs. Wycombe Wanderers)
Home colours	Away colours	Third colours

The 2011–12 season was Hartlepool United's 103rd year in existence and their fifth consecutive season in League One. Along with competing in League One, the club also participated in the FA Cup, League Cup and League Trophy. The season covers the period from 1 July 2011 to 30 June 2012.

== Background and pre-season ==
In pre-season, Hartlepool received media attention having announced a season ticket deal whereby the price would be only £100 if over 4,000 tickets would be sold. The club ultimately sold over 5,600 season tickets. The club also announced the signing of former Newcastle United player Nolberto Solano. During pre-season, Hartlepool played a testimonial for the club's record appearance maker Ritchie Humphreys against local side Sunderland.

== Review and events ==
The club began the 2011–12 campaign with a trip to Milton Keynes Dons. Hartlepool twice took the lead thanks to goals by Adam Boyd and James Brown but were pegged back late in the match to draw 2–2. They were subsequently eliminated in the first round of the League Cup after a penalty shootout defeat to Sheffield United. Hartlepool would draw three matches in a row before winning five in a row to go 3rd in the league. This was the first time in the club's history that they had gone unbeaten in their first nine matches of a season. This run was ended with a home defeat to Sheffield Wednesday in early October. The following week, Pools suffered defeat once again away to Notts County, losing 3–0 in the televised fixture. Despite the impressive start, Hartlepool would suffer poor home form. Six consecutive home defeats was a club record and signalled the end of Mick Wadsworth's tenure as Hartlepool manager.

Former manager Neale Cooper was announced as Wadsworth's successor. Cooper's first match back at the club saw Hartlepool's eighth successive home defeat. In the next home fixture, Cooper took the decision to start 17-year old Luke James. James scored in the 2–0 win against Rochdale to become the youngest goalscorer for the club in its history. This was a theme at the beginning of Cooper's second spell; giving opportunities to many younger players whilst criticising the performances of more experienced players. This win against Rochdale was followed up with an impressive away point at Sheffield Wednesday and then a comprehensive 4–0 home victory against rivals Carlisle United which gave hopes for a late play-off charge. However, Hartlepool would suffer a 5–0 away defeat to relegation threatened Wycombe Wanderers. Pools struggled in front of goal for their remaining matches and ultimately finished in 13th position.

== Players ==
As of End of Season.

=== First-team squad ===
Note: Flags indicate national team as defined under FIFA eligibility rules; some limited exceptions apply. Players may hold more than one non-FIFA nationality.

No.	Pos.	Nation	Player
1	GK	ENG	Scott Flinders
2	DF	ENG	Neil Austin
3	MF	ENG	Ritchie Humphreys
4	DF	ENG	Gary Liddle
5	DF	ENG	Sam Collins
6	DF	ENG	Evan Horwood
7	FW	ENG	James Brown
8	FW	ENG	James Poole
9	FW	SCO	Colin Nish
10	FW	ENG	Adam Boyd
11	MF	ENG	Andy Monkhouse
14	MF	ENG	Nathan Luscombe
15	MF	ENG	Antony Sweeney
16	DF	ENG	Steven Haslam
18	DF	ENG	Jack Baldwin

No.	Pos.	Nation	Player
19	DF	ENG	Jordan Richards
20	MF	ENG	Paul Murray
21	GK	ENG	Andy Rafferty
23	FW	ENG	Callum Hassan
24	MF	PER	Nolberto Solano
26	DF	ENG	Paul Johnson
27	FW	NIR	Colin Larkin
28	DF	ENG	Josh Rowbotham
29	DF	ENG	Peter Hartley
30	DF	ENG	Darren Holden
33	FW	ENG	Luke James
34	MF	ENG	Lewis Hawkins
35	FW	ENG	Ryan Noble
36	MF	ENG	Greg Rutherford

== Transfers ==
=== Transfers in ===
Date	Position	Player	From	Fee	Ref
13 May 2011	FW	James Poole	Manchester City	Free	
13 May 2011	MF	Nolberto Solano	Leicester City	Free	
27 June 2011	FW	Colin Nish	Hibernian	Free	
22 July 2011	DF	Jack Baldwin	Faversham Town	Undisclosed	
2 September 2011	DF	Stephen Wright	Brentford	Free	

=== Transfers out ===
Date	Position	Player	To	Fee	Ref
16 June 2011	MF	Leon McSweeney	Leyton Orient	Free	
23 June 2011	MF	Joe Gamble	Limerick	Free	
23 June 2011	FW	Denis Behan	Limerick	Free	
11 July 2011	DF	Dylan Purvis	Blyth Spartans	Free	
5 August 2011	FW	Michael Mackay	Consett	Free	
7 August 2011	FW	Billy Greulich	Durham City	Free	
10 August 2011	MF	Fabián Yantorno	Sud América	Free	
13 August 2011	MF	Billy Blackford	Whitby Town	Free	
15 September 2011	DF	Ármann Björnsson	ÍA	Free	
11 January 2012	DF	Jordan Mellish	Blyth Spartans	Free	
24 January 2012	DF	Stephen Wright	Wrexham	Free	

=== Loans in ===
Date from	Position	Player	From	Date until	Ref
2 March 2012	FW	Samuel Adjei	Newcastle United	2 April 2012	
20 March 2012	FW	Ryan Noble	Sunderland	1 June 2012	

=== Loans out ===
Date from	Position	Player	To	Date until	Ref
12 August 2011	FW	Callum Hassan	Harrogate Town	12 September 2011	
19 September 2011	FW	Callum Hassan	Whitby Town	19 October 2011	
19 September 2011	MF	Lewis Hawkins	Whitby Town	19 October 2011	
4 November 2011	DF	Paul Johnson	Workington	3 March 2012	
4 November 2011	FW	Steven Snaith	Workington	4 January 2012	
16 March 2012	DF	Paul Johnson	Darlington	1 June 2012	

== Results ==
=== Pre-season friendlies ===
11 July 2011	Den Bosch	2–2	Hartlepool United	Den Bosch
18:30	Reniers 50'; Karg 53'		Mooney 21'; Nish 28'	Stadium: De Vliert

20 July 2011	Blyth Spartans	1–3	Hartlepool United	Blyth
19:0	Armstrong (?)		Hassan (?); Poole (?)	Stadium: Croft Park

23 July 2011	Workington	2–3	Hartlepool United	Workington
15:00	McNiven (?); Johnson (?)		Boyd (?); Hassan (?); Sweeney (?)	Stadium: Borough Park

25 July 2011	Whitby Town	0–2	Hartlepool United	Whitby
19:00			Larkin 45'; Poole 54'	Stadium: Turnbull Ground

27 July 2011	Harrogate Town	0–3	Hartlepool United	Harrogate
19:30			Austin 48'; Nish 54'; Luscombe 90'	Stadium: Wetherby Road

30 July 2011	York City	2–1	Hartlepool United	York
15:00	Chambers; Fyfield		Boyd	Stadium: Bootham Crescent; Attendance: 1,241

2 August 2011	Hartlepool United	1–3	Sunderland	Hartlepool
19:30	Solano 8'		Gyan 31'; Colback 49'; Larsson 59'	Stadium: Victoria Park; Attendance: 5,757

=== League One ===
==== League table ====
Pos	Team	Pld	W	D	L	GF	GA	GD	Pts
11	AFC Bournemouth	46	15	13	18	48	52	−4	58
12	Tranmere Rovers	46	14	14	18	49	53	−4	56
13	Hartlepool United	46	14	14	18	50	55	−5	56
14	Bury	46	15	11	20	60	79	−19	56
15	Preston North End	46	13	15	18	54	68	−14	54

Updated to match(es) played on 5 May 2012. Source: BBC Sport
Rules for classification: 1) Points; 2) Goal difference; 3) Number of goals scored

==== Results summary ====
Overall								Home						Away					
Pld	W	D	L	GF	GA	GD	Pts	W	D	L	GF	GA	GD	W	D	L	GF	GA	GD
46	14	14	18	50	55	−5	56	6	6	11	21	22	−1	8	8	7	29	33	−4

==== Results by matchday ====
Round	1	2	3	4	5	6	7	8	9	10	11	12	13	14	15	16	17	18	19	20	21	22	23	24	25	26	27	28	29	30	31	32	33	34	35	36	37	38	39	40	41	42	43	44	45	46
Ground	A	H	H	A	A	H	A	H	A	H	A	H	A	H	H	A	A	H	H	A	H	A	A	H	H	A	A	H	H	A	H	A	A	H	A	A	H	H	A	H	A	H	H	A	H	A
Result	D	D	D	D	W	W	W	W	W	L	L	L	W	L	L	D	W	L	L	L	L	W	L	L	W	D	D	W	D	L	W	L	W	D	L	D	D	L	W	L	D	D	L	D	W	L
Position	9	13	14	16	12	6	6	5	3	7	9	10	7	10	13	12	10	11	13	13	14	12	16	17	13	13	13	10	10	14	9	11	11	9	11	11	11	12	11	11	12	12	13	14	11	13

Source: Statto.com
A = Away; H = Home; W = Win; D = Draw; L = Loss

6 August 2011 1	Milton Keynes Dons	2–2	Hartlepool United	Milton Keynes
15:00	Chadwick 53'; Ibehre 90+1'		Boyd 20'; Poole 85'	Stadium: Stadium:mk; Attendance: 7,287

13 August 2011 2	Hartlepool United	1–1	Walsall	Hartlepool
15:00	Nish 5'		Macken 3' (pen.)	Stadium: Victoria Park; Attendance: 5,170

16 August 2011 3	Hartlepool United	0–0	Huddersfield Town	Hartlepool
19:45				Stadium: Victoria Park; Attendance: 5,506

20 August 2011 4	Stevenage	2–2	Hartlepool United	Stevenage
15:00	Harrison 69'; Laird 88'		Hartley 34'; Boyd 41' (pen.)	Stadium: Broadhall Way; Attendance: 2,831

27 August 2011 5	Rochdale	1–3	Hartlepool United	Rochdale
15:00	Akpa Akpro 16'		Boyd 7'; Poole 47', 87'	Stadium: Spotland Stadium; Attendance: 2,600

3 September 2011 6	Hartlepool United	2–0	Exeter City	Hartlepool
15:00	Liddle 4'; Luscombe 89'			Stadium: Victoria Park; Attendance: 5,152

10 September 2011 7	Carlisle United	1–2	Hartlepool United	Carlisle
15:00	Loy 74' (pen.)		Liddle 21'; Boyd 41'	Stadium: Brunton Park; Attendance: 4,765

17 September 2011 8	Hartlepool United	3–0	Bury	Hartlepool
15:00	Solano 33'; Nish 51', 74'			Stadium: Victoria Park; Attendance: 5,343

24 September 2011 9	Bournemouth	1–2	Hartlepool United	Bournemouth
15:00	Gregory 37'		Solano 42'; Horwood 87'	Stadium: Dean Court; Attendance: 5,275

1 October 2011 10	Hartlepool United	0–1	Sheffield Wednesday	Hartlepool
15:00			Johnson 33'	Stadium: Victoria Park; Attendance: 6,800

9 October 2011 11	Notts County	3–0	Hartlepool United	Nottingham
16:30	Hawley 29', 55'; Montano 90+1'			Stadium: Meadow Lane; Attendance: 6,172

15 October 2011 12	Hartlepool United	1–3	Wycombe Wanderers	Hartlepool
15:00	Boyd 89' (pen.)		Donnelly 15'; Beavon 36'; Sam Collins 82' (o.g.)	Stadium: Victoria Park; Attendance: 5,421

22 October 2011 13	Chesterfield	2–3	Hartlepool United	Chesterfield
15:00	Clarke 10'; Holden 52'		Murray 17'; Poole 19', 48'	Stadium: B2net Stadium; Attendance: 5,937

25 October 2011 14	Hartlepool United	0–2	Tranmere Rovers	Hartlepool
19:45			Akins 46', 66'	Stadium: Victoria Park; Attendance: 5,200

29 October 2011 15	Hartlepool United	0–4	Charlton Athletic	Hartlepool
15:00			Wright-Phillips 9', 37'; Hollands 55'; Wagstaff 84'	Stadium: Victoria Park; Attendance: 5,333

5 November 2011 16	Leyton Orient	1–1	Hartlepool United	Leyton
15:00	Cox 23'		Austin 54' (pen.)	Stadium: Brisbane Road; Attendance: 4,424

19 November 2011 17	Scunthorpe United	0–2	Hartlepool United	Scunthorpe
15:00			Monkhouse 21'; Sweeney 77'	Stadium: Glanford Park; Attendance: 3,861

26 November 2011 18	Hartlepool United	0–1	Yeovil Town	Hartlepool
15:00			N'Gala 25'	Stadium: Victoria Park; Attendance: 4,604

29 November 2011 19	Hartlepool United	0–1	Preston North End	Hartlepool
19:45			Mellor 22'	Stadium: Victoria Park; Attendance: 4,156

10 December 2011 20	Brentford	2–1	Hartlepool United	Brentford
15:00	McGinn 80'; Alexander 85'		Collins 83'	Stadium: Griffin Park; Attendance: 6,352

17 December 2011 21	Hartlepool United	0–1	Colchester United	Hartlepool
15:00			Wordsworth 36'	Stadium: Victoria Park; Attendance: 4,029

26 December 2011 22	Oldham Athletic	0–1	Hartlepool United	Oldham
15:00			Poole 7'	Stadium: Boundary Park; Attendance: 4,459

31 December 2011 23	Sheffield United	3–1	Hartlepool United	Sheffield
13:00	Flynn 12'; Porter 34'; Evans 42'		Hartley 90+3'	Stadium: Bramall Lane; Attendance: 20,372

2 January 2012 24	Hartlepool United	1–2	Scunthorpe United	Hartlepool
15:00	Monkhouse 83'		Togwell 32'; Thompson 74'	Stadium: Victoria Park; Attendance: 5,289

7 January 2012 25	Hartlepool United	2–0	Rochdale	Hartlepool
15:00	Brown 74'; James 80'			Stadium: Victoria Park; Attendance: 4,663

14 January 2012 26	Exeter City	0–0	Hartlepool United	Exeter
15:00				Stadium: St James Park; Attendance: 4,016

21 January 2012 27	Sheffield Wednesday	2–2	Hartlepool United	Sheffield
15:00	Johnson 58'; Madine 75'		Hartley 47'; Sweeney 87'	Stadium: Hillsborough Stadium; Attendance: 17,469

28 January 2012 28	Hartlepool United	4–0	Carlisle United	Hartlepool
15:00	James 6' 67'; Sweeney 17'; Nish 81'			Stadium: Victoria Park; Attendance: 5,995

11 February 2012 29	Hartlepool United	0–0	AFC Bournemouth	Hartlepool
15:00				Stadium: Victoria Park; Attendance: 4,548

14 February 2012 30	Preston North End	1–0	Hartlepool United	Preston
19:45	Mayor 76'			Stadium: Deepdale; Attendance: 14,191

18 February 2012 31	Hartlepool United	3–0	Notts County	Hartlepool
15:00	Sweeney 37', 53'; Monkhouse 78'			Stadium: Victoria Park; Attendance: 4,718

25 February 2012 32	Wycombe Wanderers	5–0	Hartlepool United	Wycombe
15:00	Hayes 5', 55'; Doherty 11'; Beavon 42', 71'			Stadium: Adams Park; Attendance: 4,408

28 February 2012 33	Bury	1–2	Hartlepool United	Bury
19:45	Worrall 79'		Humphreys 45+1'; Boyd 74'	Stadium: Gigg Lane; Attendance: 2,072

3 March 2012 34	Hartlepool United	1–1	Milton Keynes Dons	Hartlepool
15:00	Poole 40'		O'Shea 51'	Stadium: Victoria Park; Attendance: 4,955

6 March 2012 35	Huddersfield Town	1–0	Hartlepool United	Huddersfield
19:45	Lee 75'			Stadium: Galpharm Stadium; Attendance: 12,316

10 March 2012 36	Walsall	0–0	Hartlepool United	Walsall
15:00				Stadium: Banks's Stadium; Attendance: 3,751

17 March 2012 37	Hartlepool United	0–0	Stevenage	Hartlepool
15:00				Stadium: Victoria Park; Attendance: 4,484

20 March 2012 38	Hartlepool United	0–1	Oldham Athletic	Hartlepool
19:45			Mvoto 8'	Stadium: Victoria Park; Attendance: 4,109

24 March 2012 39	Yeovil Town	0–1	Hartlepool United	Yeovil
15:00			Noble 65'	Stadium: Huish Park; Attendance: 4,033

31 March 2012 40	Hartlepool United	0–1	Sheffield United	Hartlepool
15:00			Evans 79' (pen.)	Stadium: Victoria Park; Attendance: 5,825

6 April 2012 41	Colchester United	1–1	Hartlepool United	Colchester
15:00	Sears 81' (pen.)		Sweeney 17'	Stadium: Colchester Community Stadium; Attendance: 3,921

9 April 2012 42	Hartlepool United	0–0	Brentford	Hartlepool
15:00				Stadium: Victoria Park; Attendance: 4,292

14 April 2012 43	Hartlepool United	1–2	Chesterfield	Hartlepool
15:00	Liddle 37'		Whitaker 59'; Bowery 69'	Stadium: Victoria Park; Attendance: 4,004

21 April 2012 44	Tranmere Rovers	1–1	Hartlepool United	Birkenhead
15:00	Welsh 40'; Williams (red card) 72'		Sweeney 69'	Stadium: Prenton Park; Attendance: 4,757

28 April 2012 45	Hartlepool United	2–1	Leyton Orient	Hartlepool
15:00	Sweeney 23'; Noble 73'		Campbell-Ryce 34'	Stadium: Victoria Park; Attendance: 4,502

5 May 2012 46	Charlton Athletic	3–2	Hartlepool United	Charlton
15:00	Hollands 70'; Haynes 78'; Kermorgant 81'		Hartley 31'; Liddle 86'	Stadium: The Valley; Attendance: 26,749

=== FA Cup ===
12 November 2011 First round	Hartlepool United	0–1	Stevenage	Hartlepool
15:00		Summary	Laird 10' (pen.)	Stadium: Victoria Park; Attendance: 2,744; Referee: Mark Heywood

=== League Cup ===
9 August 2011 First round	Hartlepool United	1–1 (a.e.t.) (4–5 p)	Sheffield United	Hartlepool
19:30	Sweeney 80'		Quinn 29'	Stadium: Victoria Park; Attendance: 2,774
	Penalties
	Horwood (penalty scored); Poole (penalty scored); Luscombe (penalty scored); Collins (penalty missed); Austin (penalty scored); Nish (penalty missed)		Cresswell (penalty scored); Collins (penalty scored); Montgomery (penalty missed); Quinn (penalty scored); Lowton (penalty scored); Philliskirk (penalty scored)

=== Football League Trophy ===
30 August 2011 First round	Scunthorpe United	2–0	Hartlepool United	Scunthorpe
19:00	Grant 59', 66'			Stadium: Glanford Park; Attendance: 1,763

== Squad statistics ==
=== Appearances and goals ===
No.	Pos	Nat	Player	Total		League One		FA Cup		League Cup		Other	
No.	Pos	Nat	Player	Apps	Goals	Apps	Goals	Apps	Goals	Apps	Goals	Apps	Goals
1	GK	(England) ENG	Scott Flinders	48	0	45	0	1	0	1	0	1	0
2	DF	(England) ENG	Neil Austin	49	1	46	1	1	0	1	0	1	0
3	MF	(England) ENG	Ritchie Humphreys	32	1	30	1	1	0	0	0	1	0
4	DF	(England) ENG	Gary Liddle	40	4	37	4	1	0	1	0	1	0
5	DF	(England) ENG	Sam Collins	37	1	36	1	0	0	1	0	0	0
6	DF	(England) ENG	Evan Horwood	44	1	41	1	1	0	1	0	1	0
7	FW	(England) ENG	James Brown	25	1	24	1	0	0	0	0	1	0
8	FW	(England) ENG	James Poole	30	7	27	7	1	0	1	0	1	0
9	FW	(Scotland) SCO	Colin Nish	20	4	19	4	0	0	1	0	0	0
10	FW	(England) ENG	Adam Boyd	36	6	33	6	1	0	1	0	1	0
11	MF	(England) ENG	Andy Monkhouse	48	3	45	3	1	0	1	0	1	0
12	DF	(England) ENG	Stephen Wright	11	0	10	0	1	0	0	0	0	0
14	MF	(England) ENG	Nathan Luscombe	16	1	13	1	1	0	1	0	1	0
15	MF	(England) ENG	Antony Sweeney	42	9	39	8	1	0	1	1	1	0
16	DF	(England) ENG	Steven Haslam	11	0	10	0	0	0	0	0	1	0
17	MF	(Sweden) SWE	Samuel Adjei	1	0	1	0	0	0	0	0	0	0
18	DF	(England) ENG	Jack Baldwin	17	0	17	0	0	0	0	0	0	0
19	DF	(England) ENG	Jordan Richards	2	0	2	0	0	0	0	0	0	0
20	MF	(England) ENG	Paul Murray	46	1	45	1	0	0	1	0	0	0
21	GK	(England) ENG	Andy Rafferty	2	0	1	0	1	0	0	0	0	0
23	FW	(England) ENG	Callum Hassan	1	0	1	0	0	0	0	0	0	0
24	MF	(Peru) PER	Nolberto Solano	16	2	14	2	1	0	1	0	0	0
27	FW	(Republic of Ireland) IRL	Colin Larkin	3	0	2	0	0	0	0	0	1	0
28	DF	(England) ENG	Josh Rowbotham	1	0	1	0	0	0	0	0	0	0
29	DF	(England) ENG	Peter Hartley	47	4	44	4	1	0	1	0	1	0
30	DF	(England) ENG	Darren Holden	3	0	3	0	0	0	0	0	0	0
33	MF	(England) ENG	Luke James	19	3	19	3	0	0	0	0	0	0
34	MF	(England) ENG	Lewis Hawkins	1	0	1	0	0	0	0	0	0	0
35	FW	(England) ENG	Ryan Noble	9	2	9	2	0	0	0	0	0	0
36	MF	(England) ENG	Greg Rutherford	1	0	1	0	0	0	0	0	0	0

=== Goalscorers ===
Rank	Name	League One	FA Cup	League Cup	Other	Total
1	Antony Sweeney	8	0	1	0	9
2	James Poole	7	0	0	0	7
3	Adam Boyd	6	0	0	0	6
4	Peter Hartley	4	0	0	0	4
4	Gary Liddle	4	0	0	0	4
4	Colin Nish	4	0	0	0	4
5	Luke James	3	0	0	0	3
5	Andy Monkhouse	3	0	0	0	3
6	Neil Austin	2	0	0	0	2
6	Ryan Noble	2	0	0	0	2
6	Nolberto Solano	2	0	0	0	2
7	James Brown	1	0	0	0	1
7	Sam Collins	1	0	0	)	1
7	Ritchie Humphreys	1	0	0	0	1
7	Nathan Luscombe	1	0	0	0	1
7	Paul Murray	1	0	0	0	1

=== Clean Sheets ===
Rank	Name	League One	FA Cup	League Cup	Other	Total
1	Scott Flinders	13	0	0	0	13
2	Andy Rafferty	1	0	0	0	1

=== Penalties ===
Date	Name	Opposition	Scored?
20 August 2011	Adam Boyd	Stevenage	✓
15 October 2011	Adam Boyd	Wycombe Wanderers	✓
5 November 2011	Neil Austin	Leyton Orient	✓

=== Suspensions ===
Date Incurred	Name	Games Missed	Reason
13 August 2011	Nathan Luscombe	3	(red card) (vs. Walsall)
5 November 2011	Paul Murray	1	(red card) (vs. Leyton Orient)
12 November 2011	Scott Flinders	1	(red card) (vs. Stevenage)
31 March 2012	Peter Hartley	1	(red card) (vs. Sheffield United)

== Awards ==
End of Season Awards	Winner
Hartlepool Mail Player of the Year	Peter Hartley
Players' Player of the Year	Peter Hartley
Michael Maidens' Goal of the Season	Luke James vs Rochdale
Supporters' Association Youth Team Player of the Year	Josh Rowbotham

== Aftermath ==
Following the conclusion of the season, Cooper opted to release experienced players such as Adam Boyd and James Brown. Steve Haslam, Nolberto Solano and Colin Larkin also departed. The 2012–13 season saw Hartlepool relegated to the fourth tier after six seasons in League One.
