= 2012–13 Hartlepool United F.C. season =

Hartlepool United
2012–13 season
- Owner: IOR
- Chairman: Ken Hodcroft
- Manager: Neale Cooper (until 24 October); John Hughes (from 13 November)
- Stadium: Victoria Park
- Football League One: 23rd (relegated)
- FA Cup: First round (Eliminated by Chesterfield)
- Football League Cup: First round (Eliminated by Crewe Alexandra)
- Football League Trophy: First round (Eliminated by Bradford City)
- Top goalscorer: League: Andy Monkhouse (7); All: Andy Monkhouse (7)
- Highest home attendance: 4,474 (vs Carlisle United)
- Lowest home attendance: 1,777 (vs Bradford City)
- Average home league attendance: 3,612
- Biggest win: 3–0 (vs. Crewe Alexandra)
- Biggest defeat: 6–1 (vs. Chesterfield)

The 2012–13 season was Hartlepool United's 104th year in existence and their sixth consecutive season in League One. Along with competing in League One, the club also participated in the FA Cup, League Cup and League Trophy. The season covers the period from 1 July 2012 to 30 June 2013.

== Players ==
As of End of Season.

=== First-team squad ===
Note: Flags indicate national team as defined under FIFA eligibility rules; some limited exceptions apply. Players may hold more than one non-FIFA nationality.

No.	Pos.	Nation	Player
1	GK	ENG	Scott Flinders
2	DF	ENG	Neil Austin
3	MF	ENG	Ritchie Humphreys
5	DF	ENG	Sam Collins
6	DF	ENG	Evan Horwood
7	MF	ENG	Jonathan Franks
8	MF	ENG	Simon Walton
10	FW	ENG	James Poole
11	MF	ENG	Andy Monkhouse
14	MF	ENG	Nathan Luscombe
15	MF	ENG	Antony Sweeney
16	DF	ENG	Josh Rowbotham
17	MF	ENG	Greg Rutherford
18	DF	ENG	Jack Baldwin

No.	Pos.	Nation	Player
19	DF	ENG	Jordan Richards
21	GK	ENG	Andy Rafferty
22	DF	ENG	Darren Holden
23	DF	ENG	Nathan Buddle
26	DF	ENG	Paul Johnson
28	MF	ENG	Lewis Hawkins
29	DF	ENG	Peter Hartley
31	GK	ENG	Adam McHugh
32	GK	ENG	Mark Foden
33	FW	ENG	Luke James
37	FW	ENG	Zak Boagey
38	MF	ENG	Brad Walker
39	FW	ENG	Steve Howard

== Transfers ==
=== Transfers in ===
Date	Position	Player	From	Fee	Ref
17 May 2012	MF	Jonathan Franks	Middlesbrough	Free	
6 July 2012	MF	Simon Walton	Plymouth Argyle	Free	
11 July 2012	FW	Steve Howard	Leicester City	Free	

=== Loans in ===
Date	Position	Player	From	End date	Ref
8 September 2012	MF	Craig Lynch	Sunderland	8 October 2012	
5 October 2012	FW	Ryan Noble	Sunderland	10 December 2012	
9 October 2012	FW	Charlie Wyke	Middlesbrough	9 April 2013	

=== Transfers out ===
Date	Position	Name	To	Fee	Ref
19 May 2012	MF	Nolberto Solano	Retired	—N/a	
6 June 2012	FW	James Brown	Gateshead	Free	
21 June 2012	MF	Gary Liddle	Notts County	Free	
17 August 2012	FW	Callum Hassan	Workington	Free	
20 August 2012	FW	Adam Boyd	Celtic Nation	Free	
24 August 2012	FW	Colin Larkin	Lincoln City	Free	
18 September 2012	DF	Steve Haslam	AFC Fylde	Free	
29 January 2013	MF	Paul Murray	Oldham Athletic	Free	

=== Loans out ===
Date	Position	Player	To	End date	Ref
22 August 2012	FW	Colin Nish	Dundee	1 June 2013	
15 February 2013	DF	Paul Johnson	Workington	1 June 2013	

== Results ==
=== Pre-season friendlies ===
15 July 2012 Friendly	Telstar	2–0	Hartlepool United	Velsen-Zuid
19:00	Murphy 42'; Hoefdraad 68'	Report		Stadium: Rabobank IJmond Stadion; Referee: Christiaan Bax

18 July 2012 Friendly	Almere City	3–0	Hartlepool United	Almere
19:00	Van Zaanen 40'; Dissels 76'; Lilipaly 88'	Report		Stadium: Yanmar Stadion

25 July 2012 Friendly	Whitby Town	1–1	Hartlepool United	Whitby
19:00	Mulligan 85'	Report	Murray 75'	Stadium: Turnbull Ground

27 July 2012 Friendly	Hartlepool United	1–0	Sunderland	Hartlepool
19:00	Howard 8'	Report		Stadium: Victoria Park; Attendance: 5,424; Referee: Andy Haines

31 July 2012 Friendly	Hartlepool United	2–2	Middlesbrough	Hartlepool
19:00	Sweeney 16'; Collins 82'	Report	McDonald 34'; Reach 36'	Stadium: Victoria Park; Attendance: 3,663

4 August 2012 Friendly	Hartlepool United	1–1	Hull City	Hartlepool
15:00	Franks 62'	Report	Stewart 72'	Stadium: Victoria Park; Attendance: 900

7 August 2012 Friendly	Hartlepool United	1–5	Newcastle United	Hartlepool
19:00	Sweeney 59'	Report	Ameobi 3'; Marveaux 4', 12' (pen.); Vučkić 53'; Obertan 85'	Stadium: Victoria Park; Attendance: 4,802

=== League One ===
==== League table ====
Pos	Team	Pld	W	D	L	GF	GA	GD	Pts	Promotion, qualification or relegation
20	Colchester United	46	14	9	23	47	68	−21	51	
21	Scunthorpe United (R)	46	13	9	24	49	73	−24	48	Relegation to Football League Two
22	Bury (R)	46	9	14	23	45	73	−28	41	Relegation to Football League Two
23	Hartlepool United (R)	46	9	14	23	39	67	−28	41	Relegation to Football League Two
24	Portsmouth (R)	46	10	12	24	51	69	−18	32 (Note: On 20 April Portsmouth were deducted ten points after coming out of administration.)	Relegation to Football League Two

Updated to match(es) played on 27 April 2013. Source: BBC Sport
Rules for classification: 1) Points; 2) Goal difference; 3) Number of goals scored
(R) Relegated

==== Results summary ====
Overall								Home						Away					
Pld	W	D	L	GF	GA	GD	Pts	W	D	L	GF	GA	GD	W	D	L	GF	GA	GD
46	9	14	23	39	67	−28	41	5	8	10	19	27	−8	4	6	13	20	40	−20

==== Results by matchday ====
Round	1	2	3	4	5	6	7	8	9	10	11	12	13	14	15	16	17	18	19	20	21	22	23	24	25	26	27	28	29	30	31	32	33	34	35	36	37	38	39	40	41	42	43	44	45	46
Ground	H	A	H	H	A	A	H	A	H	A	H	A	H	A	A	H	A	H	H	A	H	A	A	A	H	A	H	A	H	A	H	H	A	H	A	H	H	A	A	H	H	A	H	A	H	A
Result	D	L	W	L	D	L	D	L	L	L	D	L	L	L	D	L	L	L	L	D	L	L	L	W	L	D	L	W	W	D	D	W	W	W	L	D	D	L	L	D	L	L	W	W	D	D
Position	13	20	14	17	18	20	20	23	23	23	23	23	23	24	24	24	24	24	24	24	24	24	24	24	24	24	24	24	24	24	24	23	23	23	23	22	22	22	23	24	24	24	23	23	23	23

Source: InTheMadCrowd
A = Away; H = Home; W = Win; D = Draw; L = Loss

==== Results ====
18 August 2012 1	Hartlepool United	0–0	Swindon Town	Hartlepool
15:00		Report		Stadium: Victoria Park; Attendance: 4,132; Referee: Mark Brown

21 August 2012 2	Notts County	2–0	Hartlepool United	Nottingham
19:45	Zoko 16'; Bishop 86'	Report		Stadium: Meadow Lane; Attendance: 4,913; Referee: Stuart Attwell

1 September 2012 3	Hartlepool United	2–0	Scunthorpe United	Hartlepool
15:00	Franks 23'; James 86'	Report		Stadium: Victoria Park; Attendance: 3,863; Referee: David Coote

8 September 2012 4	Hartlepool United	1–2	Carlisle United	Hartlepool
15:00	Poole 40'	Report	Cadamarteri 76'; Robson 85'	Stadium: Victoria Park; Attendance: 4,474; Referee: James Adcock

15 September 2012 5	Bournemouth	1–1	Hartlepool United	Bournemouth
15:00	Tubbs 90'	Report	Walton 73' (pen.)	Stadium: Dean Court; Attendance: 5,308; Referee: Fred Graham

18 September 2012 6	Preston North End	5–0	Hartlepool United	Preston
19:45	Byrom 28'; Beavon 29'; King 65'; Laird 84', 87'	Report		Stadium: Deepdale; Attendance: 8,132; Referee: Tony Bates

22 September 2012 7	Hartlepool United	2–2	Shrewsbury Town	Hartlepool
15:00	Franks 15'; Monkhouse 90'	Report	Morgan 27', 82'	Stadium: Victoria Park; Attendance: 3,909; Referee: Carl Boyeson

29 September 2012 8	Colchester United	3–1	Hartlepool United	Colchester
15:00	Massey 39'; Ibehre 43', 62'	Report	Lynch 6'	Stadium: Community Stadium; Attendance: 3,471; Referee: Mick Russell

2 October 2012 9	Hartlepool United	1–2	Sheffield United	Hartlepool
19:45	Howard 78'	Report	Kitson 27'; Gallagher 89'	Stadium: Victoria Park; Attendance: 4,027; Referee: Mark Haywood

6 October 2012 10	Crewe Alexandra	2–1	Hartlepool United	Crewe
15:00	Aneke 45'; Ellis 70'	Report	Horwood 9'	Stadium: Alexandra Stadium; Attendance: 4,375; Referee: Jeremy Simpson

13 October 2012 11	Hartlepool United	1–1	Doncaster Rovers	Hartlepool
15:00	Austin 70' (pen.)	Report	Jones 89'	Stadium: Victoria Park; Attendance: 4,406; Referee: Graham Scott

16 October 2012 12	Leyton Orient	1–0	Hartlepool United	Leyton
19:45	Brunt 47'	Report		Stadium: Brisbane Road; Attendance: 2,664; Referee: Brendan Malone

20 October 2012 13	Hartlepool United	0–1	Crawley Town	Hartlepool
15:00		Report	Akpan 15'	Stadium: Victoria Park; Attendance: 3,852; Referee: Kevin Wright

23 October 2012 14	Bury	2–1	Hartlepool United	Bury
19:45	Hopper 37'; Worrall 55'	Report	Noble 56'	Stadium: Gigg Lane; Attendance: 1,877; Referee: Steven Rushton

27 October 2012 15	Brentford	2–2	Hartlepool United	Brentford
15:00	Hayes 11', 58'	Report	Dean 25' (o.g.); Craig 90' (o.g.)	Stadium: Griffin Park; Attendance: 5,213; Referee: Dave Phillips

7 November 2012 16	Hartlepool United	0–2	Tranmere Rovers	Hartlepool
19:45		Report	Robinson 79' (pen.); Stockton 90'	Stadium: Victoria Park; Attendance: 3,285; Referee: Gary Sutton

10 November 2012 17	Yeovil Town	1–0	Hartlepool United	Yeovil
15:00	Edwards 7'	Report		Stadium: Huish Park; Attendance: 3,095; Referee: Tim Robinson

17 November 2012 18	Hartlepool United	0–5	Coventry City	Hartlepool
15:00		Report	Baker 51', 59'; McGoldrick 58'; Moussa 75'; Barton 78'	Stadium: Victoria Park; Attendance: 4,404; Referee: Andy D'Urso

20 November 2012 19	Hartlepool United	1–2	Oldham Athletic	Hartlepool
19:45	Sweeney 65'	Report	Baxter 17', 90'	Stadium: Victoria Park; Attendance: 3,078; Referee: Craig Pawson

24 November 2012 20	Walsall	1–1	Hartlepool United	Walsall
15:00	Holden 49'	Report	Horwood 29' (pen.)	Stadium: Banks's Stadium; Attendance: 4,562; Referee: Iain Williamson

8 December 2012 21	Hartlepool United	0–2	Stevenage	Hartlepool
15:00		Report	Haber 19' (pen.); Akins 60'	Stadium: Victoria Park; Attendance: 3,265; Referee: Andy Madley

15 December 2012 22	Milton Keynes Dons	1–0	Hartlepool United	Milton Keynes
15:00	Lowe 16'	Report		Stadium: Stadium MK; Attendance: 7,164; Referee: Roger East

26 December 2012 23	Carlisle United	3–0	Hartlepool United	Carlisle
15:00	Collins 21' (o.g.); Robson 27'; Miller 73'	Report		Stadium: Brunton Park; Attendance: 5,380; Referee: Mark Halsey

29 December 2012 24	Sheffield United	2–3	Hartlepool United	Sheffield
15:00	Doyle 30'; Maguire 90'	Report	Howard 7', 72'; Humphreys 54'	Stadium: Bramall Lane; Attendance: 19,941; Referee: Darren Deadman

1 January 2013 25	Hartlepool United	0–1	Preston North End	Hartlepool
15:00		Report	Mousinho 45'	Stadium: Victoria Park; Attendance: 3,829; Referee: Andy Haines

12 January 2013 26	Shrewsbury Town	1–1	Hartlepool United	Shrewsbury
15:00	Taylor 23'	Report	Wyke 55'	Stadium: New Meadow; Attendance: 5,101; Referee: Carl Berry

22 January 2013 27	Hartlepool United	1–2	A.F.C. Bournemouth	Hartlepool
19:45	Baldwin 51'	Report	McQuoid 20'; Grabban 63' (pen.)	Stadium: Victoria Park; Attendance: 2,502; Referee: Mick Russell

26 January 2013 28	Portsmouth	1–3	Hartlepool United	Portsmouth
15:00	Wallace 67'	Report	Baldwin 18'; Poole 52'; Rutherford 90'	Stadium: Fratton Park; Attendance: 10,981; Referee: Darren Sheldrake

2 February 2013 29	Hartlepool United	2–1	Notts County	Hartlepool
15:00	Poole 5'; Hartley 70'	Report	Campbell-Ryce 52'	Stadium: Victoria Park; Attendance: 3,662; Referee: Steven Rushton

9 February 2013 30	Swindon Town	1–1	Hartlepool United	Swindon
15:00	Ferry 15'	Report	Monkhouse 74'	Stadium: County Ground; Attendance: 9,973; Referee: Gavin Ward

12 February 2013 31	Hartlepool United	0–0	Portsmouth	Hartlepool
19:45		Report		Stadium: Victoria Park; Attendance: 3,526; Referee: Darren Bond

16 February 2013 32	Hartlepool United	2–1	Leyton Orient	Hartlepool
15:00	Hartley 88'; James 90'	Report	Rowlands 8' (pen.)	Stadium: Victoria Park; Attendance: 3,773; Referee: Scott Duncan

23 February 2013 33	Scunthorpe United	1–2	Hartlepool United	Scunthorpe
15:00	Alabi 77'	Report	Poole 20'; Franks 37'	Stadium: Glanford Park; Attendance: 3,434; Referee: Craig Pawson

26 February 2013 34	Hartlepool United	3–0	Crewe Alexandra	Hartlepool
19:45	Wyke 27'; Franks 40'; Monkhouse 90'	Report		Stadium: Victoria Park; Attendance: 3,509; Referee: Darren Drysdale

2 March 2013 35	Doncaster Rovers	3–0	Hartlepool United	Doncaster
15:00	Hume 35'; Coppinger 54'; Paynter 81'	Report		Stadium: Keepmoat Stadium; Attendance: 7,457; Referee: Steve Bratt

5 March 2013 36	Hartlepool United	0–0	Colchester United	Hartlepool
19:45		Report		Stadium: Victoria Park; Attendance: 3,148; Referee: Geoff Eltringham

9 March 2013 37	Hartlepool United	0–0	Yeovil Town	Hartlepool
15:00		Report		Stadium: Victoria Park; Attendance: 3,633; Referee: David Webb

16 March 2013 38	Coventry City	1–0	Hartlepool United	Coventry
15:00	McDonald 33'	Report		Stadium: Ricoh Arena; Attendance: 10,412; Referee: Fred Graham

19 March 2013 39	Oldham Athletic	3–0	Hartlepool United	Oldham
19:45	Simpson 17'; M'voto 27'; Baxter 69'	Report		Stadium: Boundary Park; Attendance: 3,269; Referee: Oliver Langford

23 March 2013 40	Hartlepool United	0–0	Walsall	Hartlepool
15:00		Report		Stadium: Victoria Park; Attendance: 3,065; Referee: Andy Madley

29 March 2013 41	Hartlepool United	0–2	Milton Keynes Dons	Hartlepool
15:00		Report	Bamford 7'; Bowditch 62'	Stadium: Victoria Park; Attendance: 3,269; Referee: Jeremy Simpson

1 April 2013 42	Stevenage	1–0	Hartlepool United	Stevenage
15:00	Ehmer 76'	Report		Stadium: Lamex Stadium; Attendance: 2,903; Referee: Carl Berry

6 April 2013 43	Hartlepool United	2–0	Bury	Hartlepool
15:00	Monkhouse 42', 71'	Report		Stadium: Victoria Park; Attendance: 2,939; Referee: Darren Drysdale

13 April 2013 44	Tranmere Rovers	0–1	Hartlepool United	Birkenhead
15:00		Report	Austin 10'	Stadium: Prenton Park; Attendance: 4,721; Referee: Lee Collins

20 April 2013 45	Hartlepool United	1–1	Brentford	Hartlepool
17:15	James 25'	Report	Trotta 39'	Stadium: Victoria Park; Attendance: 3,541; Referee: Michael Naylor

27 April 2013 46	Crawley Town	2–2	Hartlepool United	Crawley
15:00	Proctor 70', 89'	Report	Monkhouse 75', 79'	Stadium: Broadfield Stadium; Attendance: 4,100; Referee: Keith Stroud

=== FA Cup ===
3 November 2012 First round	Chesterfield	6–1	Hartlepool United	Chesterfield
15:00	Boden 16'; Randall 29'; Clay 42'; Forbes 54'; Lester 79'; Westcarr 90'	Report	Sweeney 78'	Stadium: Proact Stadium; Attendance: 3,083; Referee: Christopher Sarginson

=== League Cup ===
11 August 2012 First round	Crewe Alexandra	5–0	Hartlepool United	Crewe
15:00	Leitch-Smith 7'; Clayton 13', 39'; Pogba 34', 90'	Report		Stadium: Alexandra Stadium; Attendance: 2,501; Referee: Carl Boyeson

=== Football League Trophy ===
9 October 2012 First round	Hartlepool United	0–0 (2–3 p)	Bradford City	Hartlepool
19:45		Report		Stadium: Victoria Park; Attendance: 1,777; Referee: Graham Salisbury
	Penalties
	Austin (penalty scored); Franks (penalty missed); Noble (penalty missed); Wyke (penalty scored); Horwood (penalty missed)		Thompson (penalty missed); Doyle (penalty scored); Wells (penalty scored); Connell (penalty scored); Davies (penalty missed)

== Squad statistics ==
=== Appearances and goals ===
No.	Pos	Nat	Player	Total		League One		FA Cup		League Cup		Other	
No.	Pos	Nat	Player	Apps	Goals	Apps	Goals	Apps	Goals	Apps	Goals	Apps	Goals
1	GK	(England) ENG	Scott Flinders	49	0	46	0	1	0	1	0	1	0
2	DF	(England) ENG	Neil Austin	42	2	39	2	1	0	1	0	1	0
3	MF	(England) ENG	Ritchie Humphreys	32	1	30	1	1	0	0	0	1	0
5	DF	(England) ENG	Sam Collins	43	0	41	0	1	0	1	0	0	0
6	DF	(England) ENG	Evan Horwood	40	2	37	2	1	0	1	0	1	0
7	MF	(England) ENG	Jonathan Franks	48	4	45	4	1	0	1	0	1	0
8	MF	(England) ENG	Simon Walton	37	1	34	1	1	0	1	0	1	0
10	FW	(England) ENG	James Poole	38	4	36	4	1	0	1	0	0	0
11	MF	(England) ENG	Andy Monkhouse	36	7	35	7	0	0	1	0	0	0
14	MF	(England) ENG	Nathan Luscombe	13	0	13	0	0	0	0	0	0	0
15	MF	(England) ENG	Antony Sweeney	35	2	32	1	1	1	1	0	1	0
17	MF	(England) ENG	Greg Rutherford	7	1	7	1	0	0	0	0	0	0
18	DF	(England) ENG	Jack Baldwin	34	2	32	2	1	0	0	0	1	0
19	DF	(England) ENG	Jordan Richards	11	0	11	0	0	0	0	0	0	0
20	MF	(England) ENG	Paul Murray	17	0	16	0	1	0	0	0	0	0
22	DF	(England) ENG	Darren Holden	18	0	17	0	0	0	0	0	1	0
24	MF	(England) ENG	Craig Lynch	6	1	6	1	0	0	0	0	0	0
28	MF	(England) ENG	Lewis Hawkins	1	0	1	0	0	0	0	0	0	0
29	DF	(England) ENG	Peter Hartley	46	2	43	2	1	0	1	0	1	0
33	MF	(England) ENG	Luke James	27	3	26	3	0	0	1	0	0	0
35	FW	(England) ENG	Ryan Noble	12	1	10	1	1	0	0	0	1	0
36	FW	(England) ENG	Charlie Wyke	26	2	25	2	0	0	0	0	1	0
37	FW	(England) ENG	Zak Boagey	1	0	1	0	0	0	0	0	0	0
39	FW	(England) ENG	Steve Howard	36	3	34	3	1	0	1	0	0	0

=== Goalscorers ===
Rank	Name	League One	FA Cup	League Cup	Other	Total
1	Andy Monkhouse	7	0	0	0	7
2	Jonathan Franks	4	0	0	0	4
2	James Poole	4	0	0	0	4
3	Luke James	3	0	0	0	3
3	Steve Howard	3	0	0	0	3
4	Jack Baldwin	2	0	0	0	2
4	Peter Hartley	2	0	0	0	2
4	Evan Horwood	2	0	0	0	2
4	Antony Sweeney	1	1	0	0	2
4	Charlie Wyke	2	0	0	0	2
5	Ritchie Humphreys	1	0	0	0	1
5	Craig Lynch	1	0	0	0	1
5	Ryan Noble	1	0	0	0	1
5	Greg Rutherford	1	0	0	0	1
5	Simon Walton	1	0	0	0	1

=== Clean Sheets ===
Rank	Name	League One	FA Cup	League Cup	Other	Total
1	Scott Flinders	9	0	0	1	10

=== Penalties ===
Date	Name	Opposition	Scored?
1 September 2012	Steve Howard	Scunthorpe United	✗
15 September 2012	Simon Walton	Bournemouth	✓
13 October 2012	Neil Austin	Doncaster Rovers	✓
23 October 2012	Neil Austin	Bury	✗
24 November 2012	Evan Horwood	Walsall	✓
13 April 2013	Simon Walton	Tranmere Rovers	✗

=== Suspensions ===
Date Incurred	Name	Games Missed	Reason
8 September 2012	Neil Austin	1	(yellow card) (yellow-red card) (vs. Carlisle United)
20 November 2012	Neil Austin	3	(red card) (vs. Oldham Athletic)
29 March 2013	Simon Walton	1	(red card) (vs. Milton Keynes Dons)
