= 2013–14 Hartlepool United F.C. season =

Hartlepool United
2013–14 season
- Owner: IOR
- Chairman: Ken Hodcroft
- Manager: Colin Cooper
- Stadium: Victoria Park
- League Two: 19th
- FA Cup: Second round (eliminated by Coventry City)
- League Cup: First round (eliminated by Nottingham Forest)
- League Trophy: Third round (eliminated by Rotherham United)
- Top goalscorer: League: Luke James (13); All: Luke James (16)
- Highest home attendance: 4,864 (vs Morecambe)
- Lowest home attendance: 1,740 (vs Bradford City)
- Average home league attendance: 3,723
- Biggest win: 5–0 (vs. Bradford City)
- Biggest defeat: 3–0 (vs. Burton Albion, Bury and Rochdale (x2))
Home colours	Away colours

The 2013–14 season is Hartlepool United's 93rd competitive season and their first season in League Two since 2006–07. Along with competing in League Two, the club will also participate in the FA Cup, League Cup and League Trophy. The season covers the period from 1 July 2013 to 30 June 2014.

== Players ==
As of End of Season.

=== First-team squad ===
Note: Flags indicate national team as defined under FIFA eligibility rules; some limited exceptions apply. Players may hold more than one non-FIFA nationality.

No.	Pos.	Nation	Player
1	GK	ENG	Scott Flinders
2	DF	ENG	Neil Austin
5	DF	ENG	Sam Collins
7	MF	ENG	Jonathan Franks
8	MF	ENG	Simon Walton
9	FW	ENG	Marlon Harewood
10	FW	ENG	James Poole
11	MF	ENG	Andy Monkhouse
12	FW	ENG	Jack Barmby
13	GK	ENG	Andy Rafferty
14	MF	WAL	Jack Compton
15	MF	ENG	Antony Sweeney
16	DF	ENG	Josh Rowbotham

No.	Pos.	Nation	Player
17	MF	ENG	Greg Rutherford
19	DF	ENG	Jordan Richards
20	DF	ENG	Dan Jones
21	DF	ENG	Michael Duckworth
22	DF	ENG	Darren Holden
24	DF	ENG	Scott Harrison
26	MF	ENG	Connor Oliver
27	MF	ENG	Connor Smith
28	MF	ENG	Lewis Hawkins
33	FW	ENG	Luke James
35	DF	ENG	Christian Burgess
37	FW	ENG	Zak Boagey
38	MF	ENG	Brad Walker

== Transfers ==
=== Transfers in ===
Date	Position	Player	From	Fee	Ref
27 June 2013	MF	Jack Compton	Colchester United	Free	
30 July 2013	FW	Nialle Rodney	Telford United	Free	
22 August 2013	DF	Michael Duckworth	Bradford Park Avenue	Free	
13 January 2014	FW	Marlon Harewood	Bristol City	Free	

=== Transfers out ===
Date	Position	Player	To	Fee	Ref
19 June 2013	DF	Evan Horwood	Tranmere Rovers	Free	
15 July 2013	DF	Ritchie Humphreys	Chesterfield	Free	
7 August 2013	DF	Peter Hartley	Stevenage	Undisclosed	
31 January 2014	DF	Jack Baldwin	Peterborough United	£500,000	

== Competitions ==
=== League Two ===
==== League table ====
Pos	Team	Pld	W	D	L	GF	GA	GD	Pts
17	Cheltenham Town	46	13	16	17	53	63	−10	55
18	Morecambe	46	13	15	18	52	64	−12	54
19	Hartlepool United	46	14	11	21	50	56	−6	53
20	AFC Wimbledon	46	14	14	18	49	57	−8	53 (Note: On 28 April AFC Wimbledon were deducted 3 points for fielding an ineligible player.)
21	Northampton Town	46	13	14	19	42	57	−15	53

Updated to match(es) played on 3 May 2014. Source: BBC Sport
Rules for classification: 1) Points; 2) Goal difference; 3) Number of goals scored

==== Results summary ====
Overall								Home						Away					
Pld	W	D	L	GF	GA	GD	Pts	W	D	L	GF	GA	GD	W	D	L	GF	GA	GD
46	14	11	21	50	56	−6	53	10	3	10	30	27	+3	4	8	11	20	29	−9

==== Results by matchday ====
Round	1	2	3	4	5	6	7	8	9	10	11	12	13	14	15	16	17	18	19	20	21	22	23	24	25	26	27	28	29	30	31	32	33	34	35	36	37	38	39	40	41	42	43	44	45	46
Ground	A	H	A	H	A	H	H	A	H	A	A	H	H	A	H	A	H	A	H	A	H	A	A	H	H	A	H	A	H	A	H	A	A	H	A	A	H	A	H	H	A	H	A	H	A	H
Result	L	L	D	L	D	L	W	D	L	W	W	W	W	L	W	L	W	L	D	D	D	D	W	L	L	L	W	L	D	W	W	D	L	W	L	D	W	L	L	L	L	L	L	W	D	L
Position	24	24	23	23	23	23	21	20	22	19	16	16	14	14	13	13	12	13	13	14	14	14	13	14	16	16	14	16	15	11	8	9	9	9	10	10	10	10	11	13	15	18	19	17	18	19

Source: Statto.com
A = Away; H = Home; W = Win; D = Draw; L = Loss

==== Results ====
3 August 2013 1	Rochdale	3–0	Hartlepool United	Rochdale
15:00	Hogan 14'; Donnelly 50'; Henderson 58'	Report		Stadium: Spotland; Attendance: 3,177; Referee: Michael Bull

10 August 2013 2	Hartlepool United	0–1	Southend United	Hartlepool
15:00		Report	Eastwood 5'	Stadium: Victoria Park; Attendance: 3,479; Referee: Mark Brown

17 August 2013 3	York City	0–0	Hartlepool United	York
15:00		Report		Stadium: Bootham Crescent; Attendance: 4,768; Referee: Dave Phillips

24 August 2013 4	Hartlepool United	0–1	Fleetwood Town	Hartlepool
15:00		Report	Hughes 16'	Stadium: Victoria Park; Attendance: 3,297; Referee: Steven Rushton

31 August 2013 5	Torquay United	0–0	Hartlepool United	Torquay
15:00		Report		Stadium: Plainmoor; Attendance: 2,646; Referee: Oliver Langford

7 September 2013 6	Hartlepool United	1–2	Wycombe Wanderers	Hartlepool
15:00	Poole 90'	Report	Kretzschmar 51', 69'	Stadium: Victoria Park; Attendance: 3,640; Referee: Mark Haywood

14 September 2013 7	Hartlepool United	2–1	Accrington Stanley	Hartlepool
15:00	Franks 30'; Monkhouse 42'	Report	Gray 57'	Stadium: Victoria Park; Attendance: 3,388; Referee: Michael Naylor

21 September 2013 8	Bristol Rovers	2–2	Hartlepool United	Bristol
15:00	Harrold 35'; O'Toole 90'	Report	James 36', 45'	Stadium: Memorial Stadium; Attendance: 5,579; Referee: Charles Breakspear

28 September 2013 9	Hartlepool United	1–3	Oxford United	Hartlepool
15:00	James 48'	Report	Williams 5'; Smalley 67'; Hall 90' (pen.)	Stadium: Victoria Park; Attendance: 3,799; Referee: Jeremy Simpson

5 October 2013 10	Mansfield Town	1–4	Hartlepool United	Mansfield
15:00	Clucas 75' (pen.)	Report	Monkhouse 8'; Compton 44', 50'; Poole 79'	Stadium: One Call Stadium; Attendance: 3,457; Referee: Graham Horwood

12 October 2013 11	Exeter City	0–3	Hartlepool United	Exeter
15:00		Report	Baldwin 21'; James 50'; Compton 62'	Stadium: St James Park; Attendance: 3,615; Referee: Andy Davies

19 October 2013 12	Hartlepool United	1–0	Plymouth Argyle	Hartlepool
15:00	James 55'	Report		Stadium: Victoria Park; Attendance: 3,929; Referee: Scott Mathieson

22 October 2013 13	Hartlepool United	3–1	AFC Wimbledon	Hartlepool
19:45	Walton 32' (pen.); James 72'; Dolan 83'	Report	Pell 66' (pen.)	Stadium: Victoria Park; Attendance: Darren Bond; Referee: 3,652

26 October 2013 14	Scunthorpe United	1–0	Hartlepool United	Scunthorpe
15:00	Winnall 76'	Report		Stadium: Glanford Park; Attendance: Darren Bond; Referee: 3,652

2 November 2013 15	Hartlepool United	2–1	Dagenham & Redbridge	Hartlepool
15:00	Poole 12'; Monkhouse 79'	Report	Hines 56'	Stadium: Victoria Park; Attendance: 3,450; Referee: Graham Salisbury

15 November 2013 16	Newport County	2–0	Hartlepool United	Newport
19:45	Worley 7'; Washington 64'	Report		Stadium: Rodney Parade; Attendance: 3,094; Referee: Steve Martin

23 November 2013 17	Hartlepool United	2–0	Northampton Town	Hartlepool
15:00	James 23'; Walton 49' (pen.)	Report		Stadium: Victoria Park; Attendance: 3,617; Referee: Mark Haywood

26 November 2013 18	Bury	1–0	Hartlepool United	Bury
19:45	Nardiello 48'	Report		Stadium: Gigg Lane; Attendance: 1,998; Referee: Mark Heywood

30 November 2013 19	Hartlepool United	0–0	Portsmouth	Hartlepool
15:00		Report		Stadium: Victoria Park; Attendance: 4,126; Referee: Paul Tierney

14 December 2013 20	Cheltenham Town	2–2	Hartlepool United	Cheltenham
15:00	McGlashan 4'; Roofe 38'	Report	Franks 54', 71'	Stadium: Whaddon Road; Attendance: 2,491; Referee: Steven Rushton

21 December 2013 20	Hartlepool United	1–1	Burton Albion	Hartlepool
15:00	Walker 69'	Report	Edwards 18'	Stadium: Victoria Park; Attendance: 3,595; Referee: Richard Clark

26 December 2013 21	Chesterfield	1–1	Hartlepool United	Chesterfield
15:00	Darikwa 31'	Report	Dolan 48' (pen.)	Stadium: Proact Stadium; Attendance: 7,680; Referee: Gary Sutton

29 December 2013 22	Morecambe	1–2	Hartlepool United	Morecambe
15:00	Sampson 87'	Report	Baldwin 18'; Franks 90'	Stadium: Globe Arena; Attendance: 2,081; Referee: Michael Naylor

1 January 2014 23	Hartlepool United	0–3	Bury	Hartlepool
15:00		Report	Mayor 5'; Nardiello 12'; Hinds 75'	Stadium: Victoria Park; Attendance: 3,529 (228 away fans); Referee: Andy Haines

11 January 2014 24	Hartlepool United	0–3	Rochdale	Hartlepool
15:00		Report	Donnelly 50'; Kavanagh 63'; Cummins 90'	Stadium: Victoria Park; Attendance: 3,685 (232 away fans); Referee: Rob Lewis

18 January 2014 25	Fleetwood Town	2–0	Hartlepool United	Fleetwood
15:00	Parkin 67'; Marrow 69'	Report		Stadium: Highbury Stadium; Attendance: 3,009; Referee: James Adcock

25 January 2014 26	Hartlepool United	2–0	York City	Hartlepool
15:00	James 82'; Barmby 89'	Report		Stadium: Victoria Park; Attendance: 4,673 (956 away fans); Referee: Iain Williamson

28 January 2014 27	AFC Wimbledon	2–1	Hartlepool United	Kingston upon Thames
19:45	Antwi 74'; Hylton 76'	Report	James 44'	Stadium: Kingsmeadow; Attendance: 3,730 (239 away fans); Referee: Mark Haywood

1 February 2014 29	Hartlepool United	0–0	Scunthorpe United	Hartlepool
15:00		Report		Stadium: Victoria Park; Attendance: 3,727 (497 away fans); Referee: Jeremy Simpson

8 February 2014 30	Dagenham & Redbridge	0–2	Hartlepool United	Dagenham
15:00		Report	Williams 69'; Monkhouse 89'	Stadium: Victoria Road; Attendance: 3,357 (196 away fans); Referee: Steven Rushton

15 February 2014 31	Hartlepool United	3–0	Newport County	Hartlepool
15:00	James 41'; Sandell O.G. 55'; Williams 90+3'	Report		Stadium: Victoria Park; Attendance: 3,470 (127 away fans); Referee: Trevor Kettle

18 February 2014 32	Southend United	1–1	Hartlepool United	Southend
19:45	Corr 43'	Report	Walker 59'	Stadium: Roots Hall; Attendance: 4,361 (106 away fans); Referee: Keith Hill

22 February 2014 33	Northampton Town	2–0	Hartlepool United	Northampton
15:00	Doumbe 45+7'; Dickenson 47'	Report		Stadium: Sixfields Stadium; Attendance: 4,083 (268 away fans); Referee: Darren Bond

1 March 2014 34	Hartlepool United	3–0	Torquay United	Hartlepool
15:00	Barmby 31'; James 54'; Harewood 64'	Report		Stadium: Victoria Park; Attendance: 3,437 (91 away fans); Referee: Fred Graham

8 March 2014 35	Wycombe Wanderers	2–1	Hartlepool United	High Wycombe
15:00	Morgan 52'; McClure 70'	Report	Barmby 42'	Stadium: Adams Park; Attendance: 3,073 (188 away fans); Referee: Andy Madley

11 March 2014 36	Accrington Stanley	0–0	Hartlepool United	Accrington
19:45		Report		Stadium: Crown Ground; Attendance: 1,196 (175 away fans); Referee: David Coote

15 March 2014 37	Hartlepool United	4–0	Bristol Rovers	Hartlepool
15:00	Harewood 2'; Walker 16'; Walton 56'; Franks 90'	Report		Stadium: Victoria Park; Attendance: 3,480 (239 away fans); Referee: Seb Stockbridge

21 March 2014 38	Oxford United	1–0	Hartlepool United	Oxford
19:45	Connolly 78'	Report		Stadium: Kassam Stadium; Attendance: 4,954 (185 away fans); Referee: Andy Davies

25 March 2014 39	Hartlepool United	2–4	Mansfield Town	Hartlepool
19:45	Harewood 28'; James 53'	Report	Jennings 20', 72'; Rhead 80'; McGuire 90+2'	Stadium: Victoria Park; Attendance: 2,976 (129 away fans); Referee: Gary Sutton

29 March 2014 40	Hartlepool United	0–1	Cheltenham Town	Hartlepool
15:00		Report	McGlashan 74'	Stadium: Victoria Park; Attendance: 3,328 (104 away fans); Referee: Graham Salisbury

5 April 2014 41	Portsmouth	1–0	Hartlepool United	Portsmouth
15:00	Webster 2'	Report		Stadium: Fratton Park; Attendance: 15,273 (187 away fans); Referee: Andy D’Urso

12 April 2014 42	Hartlepool United	1–2	Chesterfield	Hartlepool
15:00	James 24'	Report	Cooper 30'; Doyle 49'	Stadium: Victoria Park; Attendance: 3,778 (553 away fans); Referee: Eddie Ilderton

19 April 2014 43	Burton Albion	3–0	Hartlepool United	Burton upon Trent
15:00	Kee 28'; Phillips 58'; Bell 85'	Report		Stadium: Pirelli Stadium; Attendance: 2,558; Referee: Michael Bull

21 April 2014 44	Hartlepool United	2–1	Morecambe	Hartlepool
15:00	Compton 67'; Barmby 81'	Report	Ellison 25'	Stadium: Victoria Park; Attendance: 4,864 (241 away fans); Referee: Scott Duncan

26 April 2014 45	Plymouth Argyle	1–1	Hartlepool United	Plymouth
15:00	Banton 30'	Report	Barmby 67'	Stadium: Home Park; Attendance: 6,617 (246 away fans); Referee: Gary Sutton

3 May 2014 46	Hartlepool United	0–2	Exeter City	Hartlepool
15:00		Report	Keohane 25'; Wheeler 44'	Stadium: Victoria Park; Attendance: 4,710 (186 away fans); Referee: Darren Deadman

=== FA Cup ===
9 November 2013 First Round	Hartlepool United	3–2	Notts County	Hartlepool
15:00	Baldwin 16'; James 42', 72'	Report	Leacock 17'; Murray 84'	Stadium: Victoria Park; Attendance: 3,313; Referee: Carl Boyeson

7 December 2013 Second Round	Hartlepool United	1–1	Coventry City	Hartlepool
15:00	Monkhouse 78'	Report	Baker 12'	Stadium: Victoria Park; Attendance: 2,898; Referee: Robert Madley

17 December 2013 Replay	Coventry City	2–1	Hartlepool United	Northampton
19:45	Clarke 36', 90'	Report	Baldwin 88'	Stadium: Sixfields Stadium; Attendance: 1,214; Referee: Keith Hill

=== League Cup ===
6 August 2013 First Round	Nottingham Forest	3–1	Hartlepool United	Nottingham
19:45	Majewski 33'; Halford 65'; Derbyshire 67'	Report	Austin 76'	Stadium: City Ground; Attendance: 9,081; Referee: Stephen Martin

=== Football League Trophy ===
3 September 2013 First round	Hartlepool United	5–0	Bradford City	Hartlepool
19:00	James 24'; Franks 48'; Burgess 56'; Compton 59' (pen.); Rodney 87'	Report		Stadium: Victoria Park; Attendance: 1,740; Referee: Richard Clark

8 October 2013 Second round	Sheffield United	0–1	Hartlepool United	Sheffield
19:45 BST			Poole 37'	Stadium: Bramall Lane; Attendance: 4,189

12 November 2013 Area quarter-final	Hartlepool United	1–2	Rotherham United	Hartlepool
19:00 GMT	Monkhouse 24'	Report	Eaves 9'; Agard 45'	Stadium: Victoria Park; Attendance: 2,911; Referee: Darren Drysdale

== Squad statistics ==
=== Appearances and goals ===
No.	Pos	Nat	Player	Total		League One		FA Cup		League Cup		Other	
No.	Pos	Nat	Player	Apps	Goals	Apps	Goals	Apps	Goals	Apps	Goals	Apps	Goals
1	GK	(England) ENG	Scott Flinders	50	0	43	0	3	0	1	0	3	0
2	DF	(England) ENG	Neil Austin	36	1	29	0	3	0	1	1	3	0
4	MF	(England) ENG	Matthew Dolan	24	2	19	2	3	0	0	0	2	0
5	DF	(England) ENG	Sam Collins	27	0	24	0	2	0	0	0	1	0
6	DF	(England) ENG	Jack Baldwin	34	4	28	2	3	2	1	0	2	0
7	MF	(England) ENG	Jonathan Franks	46	6	39	5	3	0	1	0	3	1
8	MF	(England) ENG	Simon Walton	46	3	39	3	3	0	1	0	3	0
9	FW	(England) ENG	Steve Howard	9	0	8	0	0	0	1	0	0	0
9	FW	(England) ENG	Marlon Harewood	19	3	19	3	0	0	0	0	0	0
10	FW	(England) ENG	James Poole	39	4	33	3	3	0	0	0	3	1
11	MF	(England) ENG	Andy Monkhouse	42	6	36	4	3	1	0	0	3	1
12	FW	(England) ENG	Jack Barmby	17	5	17	5	0	0	0	0	0	0
13	GK	(England) ENG	Andy Rafferty	4	0	3	0	0	0	1	0	0	0
14	MF	(Wales) WAL	Jack Compton	39	5	34	4	2	0	1	0	2	1
15	MF	(England) ENG	Antony Sweeney	23	0	19	0	2	0	1	0	1	0
17	MF	(England) ENG	Greg Rutherford	1	0	1	0	0	0	0	0	0	0
18	MF	(England) ENG	Luke Williams	7	2	7	2	0	0	0	0	0	0
19	DF	(England) ENG	Jordan Richards	22	0	19	0	1	0	0	0	2	0
20	DF	(England) ENG	Dan Jones	1	0	1	0	0	0	0	0	0	0
21	DF	(England) ENG	Michael Duckworth	36	0	30	0	3	0	0	0	3	0
22	DF	(England) ENG	Darren Holden	28	0	26	0	0	0	1	0	1	0
23	FW	(England) ENG	Nialle Rodney	15	1	12	0	0	0	1	0	2	1
24	DF	(England) ENG	Scott Harrison	6	0	6	0	0	0	0	0	0	0
26	MF	(England) ENG	Connor Oliver	3	0	3	0	0	0	0	0	0	0
27	MF	(England) ENG	Connor Smith	1	0	1	0	0	0	0	0	0	0
28	MF	(England) ENG	Lewis Hawkins	5	0	5	0	0	0	0	0	0	0
29	DF	(England) ENG	Peter Hartley	1	0	1	0	0	0	0	0	0	0
33	FW	(England) ENG	Luke James	49	16	42	13	3	2	1	0	3	1
35	DF	(England) ENG	Christian Burgess	46	1	41	0	2	0	1	0	2	1
38	MF	(England) ENG	Brad Walker (footballer)	42	3	36	3	2	0	1	0	3	0
