= Jack Baldwin (footballer) =

English footballer (born 1993)

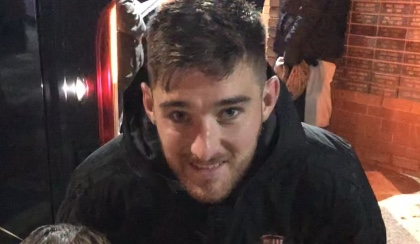
- Baldwin in 2018

Personal information
- Full name: Jack Baldwin
- Date of birth: 30 June 1993 (age 33)
- Place of birth: Barking, England
- Height: 6 ft 1 in (1.85 m)
- Position: Centre-back

Team information
- Current team: Hornchurch
- Number: 5

Senior career*
Years	Team	Apps	(Gls)
2010–2011	Faversham Town		
2011–2014	Hartlepool United	77	(4)
2014–2018	Peterborough United	100	(4)
2018–2020	Sunderland	34	(3)
2019–2020	→ Salford City (loan)	13	(1)
2020–2021	Bristol Rovers	41	(1)
2021–2024	Ross County	89	(3)
2024–2025	Northampton Town	22	(1)
2025–2026	Colchester United	2	(0)
2026	→ Eastleigh (loan)	3	(0)
2026–	Hornchurch	6	(1)
- * Club domestic league appearances and goals as of 18:26, 11 October 2026 (UTC)

Jack Baldwin (born 30 June 1993) is an English professional footballer who plays as a centre-back for National League club Hornchurch.

== Career ==
=== Hartlepool United ===
Baldwin was born in Barking, Greater London. He was on trial at Gillingham and impressed Gills boss Andy Hessenthaler after a season with Faversham Town's first-team at the age of 18 years before going on trial with North-East side Hartlepool United and signing a professional contract after impressing manager Mick Wadsworth in pre-season friendlies. Prior to signing this contract, Baldwin was due to start University in a few months time to do a course in Sports Therapy at Kent.

Baldwin made his senior debut for Hartlepool United on 17 December 2011 in a 1–0 home defeat against Colchester United with caretaker boss Micky Barron saying "Jack came in and was steady. He got on the ball, won his tackles and headers and competed really well. He's been terrific since he came to the club on trial in pre-season." After playing for the reserve side from the start of the season, Baldwin began to establish himself in the Hartlepool United's starting eleven, playing in either defensive-midfield and centre-back throughout the 2011–12 season. He went on to make seventeen appearances in his first season and shortly after the end of the 2011–12 season, Baldwin committed his future to Hartlepool by signing a long-term contract with the club.

In the 2012–13 season, Baldwin found himself in and out of the first team, where he was often featured on the substitute bench. After being suspended for one match and appearing three times as an unused substitute on the bench, Baldwin scored his first senior goal in a 2–1 defeat to A.F.C. Bournemouth in January 2013 and then scored again, four days later in a 3–1 win away to Portsmouth. Baldwin then set up two of Hartlepool's three goals, in a 3–0 win over Crewe Alexandra on 26 February 2013. However, during a 0–0 draw against Colchester United on 5 March 2013, he injured his right knee and was substituted before half-time. Initially ruled out for the rest of the season, Baldwin returned to the training soon after and played his first match in weeks on 29 March 2013, in a 2–0 loss against MK Dons. By the end of the 2012–13 season, Baldwin had made thirty-five appearances and scoring twice in all competitions.

During the 2013–14 season, Baldwin began to established himself in the first team once more at Hartlepool United, forming a partnership with Christian Burgess. He scored his first goal of the season on 12 October 2013, in a 3–0 win over Exeter City. He went on to score two goals in the FA Cup campaign against Notts County and Coventry City. On 29 December 2013, Baldwin scored again, in a 2–1 win over Morecambe. Following this, Baldwin was linked a move away from Hartlepool United, with League One side Peterborough United among those interested in him. Up until his departure from Hartlepool United, he was an ever-present player for the side, having started every league match since the start of the season.

=== Peterborough United ===
Baldwin moved to League One side Peterborough United for £500,000 on 31 January 2014 just minutes before the transfer deadline. Upon joining the club, it was revealed the price tag could rise up to £750,000 with the potential for add-ons.

After being initially out of the first team, due to being suspended whilst at Hartlepool United, Baldwin made his Peterborough United debut on 1 March 2014 against Crawley Town, coming on as a late second-half substitute, and conceded a penalty in a 1–0 loss. Since making his debut, Baldwin quickly became a Peterborough's first team regular and helped the side reach the play-offs where they were unsuccessful after losing 3–2 to Leyton Orient. His performance was praised by Manager Darren Ferguson. At the end of the 2013–14 season, Baldwin went on to make thirteen appearances in all competitions. He was however cup-tied for their victory in the 2013-14 Football League Trophy.

The 2014–15 season, however, saw Baldwin suffer several setbacks despite being featured in the first team regularly After playing in the opening game of the season against Rochdale, Baldwin suffered a knee injury that kept him out for the remainder of August. Two months later, on 21 October 2014, Baldwin was sent-off for a second bookable offence, in a 1–0 loss against Crewe Alexandra. On 1 November 2014 Baldwin captained Peterborough for the first time. In the same game he ruptured a knee ligament that would rule him out for the next ten to twelve months. Baldwin finished his first full season having made eleven appearances in all competitions.

The 2015–16 season saw Baldwin continue to rehabilitate his knee injury and it wasn't until on 22 September 2015 that he returned from injury, playing for Peterborough United's development side, in a 3–1 win over Norwich City's development side. After returning to the first team on the substitute bench against Scunthorpe United on 28 November 2015, he made his first appearance of the season on 26 December 2015, coming on as a second-half substitute, in a 2–0 win over Chesterfield. Although sidelined on two occasions in February 2016, Baldwin played his first match as captain on 5 March 2016, in a 1–1 draw against Wigan Athletic and went on to captain on four occasions. Baldwin scored his first goal for the club on 30 April 2016, in a 4–3 win over Shrewsbury Town. Having established himself in the starting eleven with Ricardo Santos, Baldwin went on to make twenty-two appearances, scoring once, in all competitions. For his performances, he was awarded PFA Community Champion by the club.

The start of the 2016–17 season saw Baldwin being booked for the first three league matches before being sent-off for a second bookable offence, in a 2–1 loss against Oxford United on 20 August 2016. After serving a one match suspension, Baldwin featured in every league match until he was demoted to the substitute bench for two matches due to good performances from Ryan Tafazolli. However, he suffered a knee injury that kept him out for two months. It wasn't until on 21 February 2017 when Baldwin returned to the first team and captained the side as well, in a 4–1 loss against Southend United. Four days later, on 25 February 2017, Baldwin captained and scored again, in a 3–1 win over Rochdale. Despite being absent on two occasions later in the season, Baldwin finished the 2016–17 season, making twenty-nine appearances and scoring once in all competitions. On 25 May 2017, Baldwin signed a new two-year contract with the League One side.

Ahead of the 2017–18 season, Baldwin was named the new captain of Peterborough United, succeeding Christopher Forrester.

=== Sunderland ===
Baldwin signed a two-year deal at newly relegated League One club Sunderland on 28 July 2018 for an undisclosed fee. He scored his first goal for the club in a 2–1 win against Bradford City on 6 October 2018.

It was announced on 17 June 2020 that Baldwin would be leaving Sunderland, bringing an end to his 2 years at the club.

==== Salford City ====
On 2 September 2019, he signed for newly promoted Salford City on loan for the rest of the 2019–20 season.

=== Bristol Rovers ===
Baldwin joined Bristol Rovers on 20 July 2020 on a two-year contract.

He made his debut for the club on 5 September 2020, in a 3-0 League Cup defeat to Ipswich Town. He didn't make his league debut until the 3 October 2020 when he started in a 2–0 home victory over Northampton Town, a game in which Baldwin scored the second goal ten minutes from time, controlling and volleying in a ball from across the box.

On 25 August 2021, having featured in all four of Rovers' league games to date, Baldwin had his contract terminated, his last game for the club being a 4–1 League Two defeat at Exeter City.

=== Ross County ===
On 25 August 2021, Baldwin joined Scottish Premiership side Ross County following the termination of his Bristol Rovers contract earlier in the day.

Ahead of the 2023–24 season, Baldwin was named as club captain.

=== Northampton Town ===
On 9 July 2024, Baldwin returned to England, signing for League One side Northampton Town for an undisclosed fee on a two-year deal.

=== Colchester United ===
On 7 August 2025, Baldwin had his contract with Northampton Town terminated by mutual consent, allowing him to join League Two club Colchester United. In September 2025, he suffered a knee injury.

On 27 March 2026, Baldwin joined National League club Eastleigh on loan for the remainder of the season. On 16 May 2026 Colchester announced he was being released.

=== Hornchurch ===
On 29 June 2026, Baldwin agreed to join newly promoted National League club Hornchurch.

== Style of play ==
Baldwin is a versatile footballer who can play centre-back, right-back or central midfield. Former Hartlepool manager Neale Cooper likened 18-year-old Baldwin to a 'young Alan Hansen' praising Baldwin on 'the way he reads the game'.

== Personal life ==
Up until joining Hartlepool United, Baldwin attended Eastbury Comprehensive School and was at the time studying for his A-level exams.

In 2014, Baldwin became a father and cited family reason as the reason he left Hartlepool United. Later in 2014, Baldwin took part in a cycling challenge with Andy Rafferty for the 120-mile ride from Whitehaven, in Cumbria, to Blackhall in aid of raising money for London-based Richard House Children's Hospice.

== Career statistics ==
As of 10 October 2026

Appearances and goals by club, season and competition
Club	Season	League			National Cup		League Cup		Other		Total	
Club	Season	Division	Apps	Goals	Apps	Goals	Apps	Goals	Apps	Goals	Apps	Goals
Hartlepool United	2011–12	League One	17	0	0	0	0	0	0	0	17	0
Hartlepool United	2012–13	League One	32	2	1	0	0	0	1 (Note: Appearance(s) in Football League Trophy)	0	34	2
Hartlepool United	2013–14	League Two	28	2	3	2	1	0	2	0	34	4
Hartlepool United	Total		77	4	4	2	1	0	3	0	85	6
Peterborough United	2013–14	League One	11	0	—		—		2 (Note: Appearances in League One play-offs)	0	13	0
Peterborough United	2014–15	League One	11	0	0	0	0	0	0	0	11	0
Peterborough United	2015–16	League One	18	1	4	0	0	0	0	0	22	1
Peterborough United	2016–17	League One	27	1	0	0	1	0	1 (Note: Appearance(s) in EFL Trophy)	0	29	1
Peterborough United	2017–18	League One	33	2	3	1	1	0	6	0	43	3
Peterborough United	Total		100	4	7	1	2	0	9	0	118	5
Sunderland	2018–19	League One	34	3	3	0	1	0	3	0	41	3
Sunderland	2019–20	League One	0	0	—		1	0	—		1	0
Sunderland	Total		34	3	3	0	2	0	3	0	42	3
Salford City (loan)	2019–20	League Two	13	1	0	0	—		4	0	17	1
Bristol Rovers	2020–21	League One	38	1	3	1	1	0	3	0	45	2
Bristol Rovers	2021–22	League Two	3	0	0	0	1	0	0	0	4	0
Bristol Rovers	Total		41	1	3	1	2	0	3	0	49	2
Ross County	2021–22	Scottish Premiership	30	2	0	0	0	0	—		30	2
Ross County	2022–23	Scottish Premiership	29	1	1	0	2	0	2 (Note: Appearances in Scottish Premiership play-offs)	0	34	1
Ross County	2023–24	Scottish Premiership	30	0	0	0	6	1	2 (Note: Appearances in Scottish Premiership play-offs)	1	38	2
Ross County	Total		89	3	1	0	8	1	4	1	102	5
Northampton Town	2024–25	League One	22	1	1	0	1	0	0	0	24	1
Colchester United	2025–26	League Two	2	0	0	0	0	0	1	0	3	0
Eastleigh (loan)	2025–26	National League	3	0	0	0	0	0	0	0	3	0
Hornchurch	2026–27	National League	6	1	0	0	0	0	0	0	6	1
Career total			387	18	19	4	16	1	27	1	449	24

== Honours ==
Sunderland

- EFL Trophy runner-up: 2018–19
