= Darren Holden (footballer) =

English-South African footballer

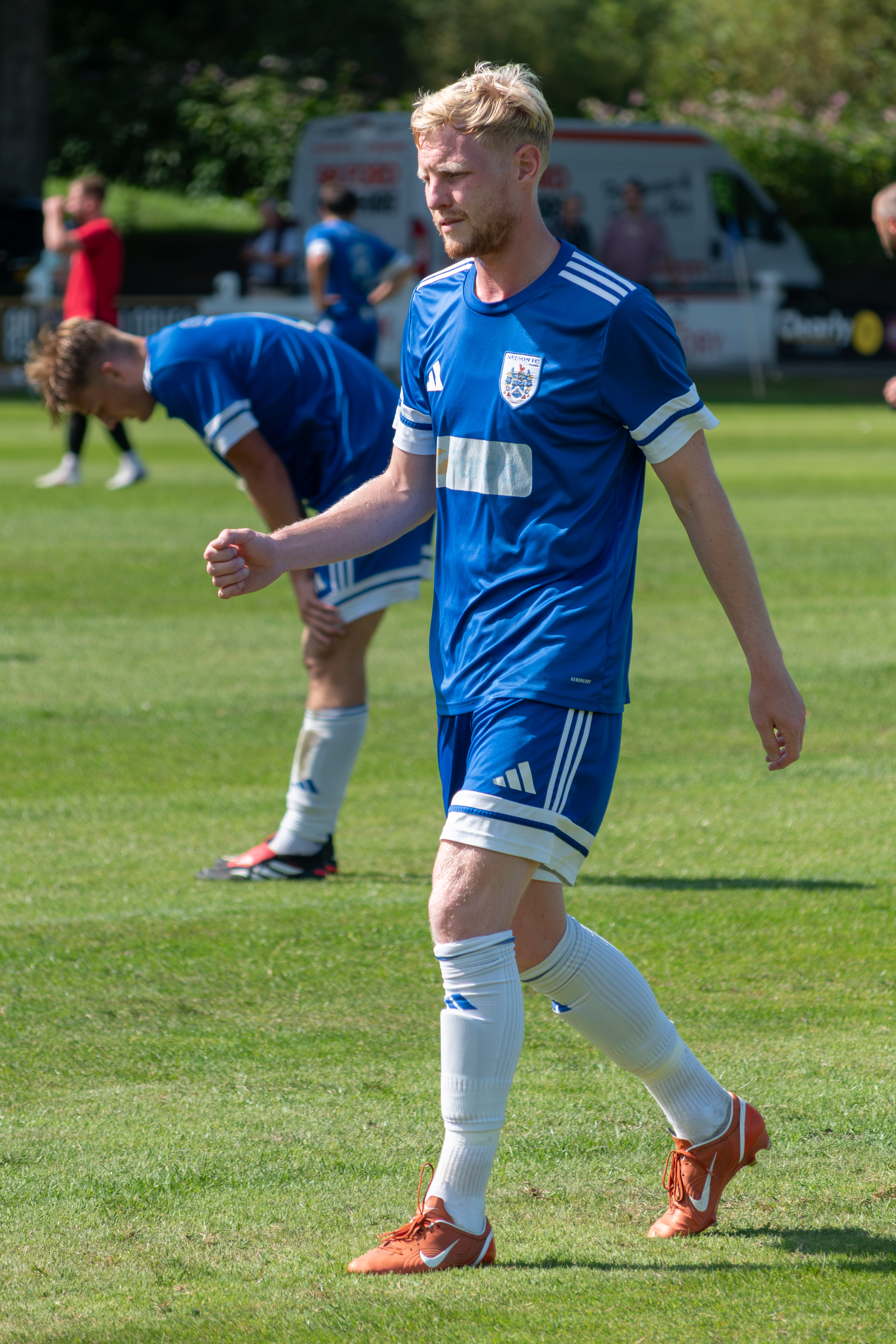
- Holden playing for Nelson in 2026

Personal information
- Full name: Darren Holden
- Date of birth: 27 August 1993 (age 33)
- Place of birth: Krugersdorp, South Africa
- Height: 1.80 m (5 ft 11 in)
- Position: Left back

Team information
- Current team: Nelson

Youth career
- 2010–2011: Hartlepool United

Senior career*
Years	Team	Apps	(Gls)
2011–2015	Hartlepool United	58	(0)
2015–2016	Ross County	0	(0)
2016	Gateshead	7	(0)
2016	Jarrow Roofing		
2016–2017	South Shields		
2017	West Auckland Town		
2017–2018	Guiseley	18	(0)
2018–2022	Consett	99	(7)
2022–2023	Clitheroe	37	(0)
2023–2024	Mossley	20	(0)
2024–	Nelson	62	(3)
- * Club domestic league appearances and goals as of 14:53, 20 May 2026 (UTC)

Darren Holden (born 27 August 1993) is an English-South African professional footballer who plays for Nelson as a defender.

== Career ==
=== Youth ===
Born in Krugersdorp, Gauteng, South Africa, Holden moved to North-East England at a young age. He represented the Durham County School FA's under-18 side in 2009–10 whilst attending Gateshead College. In July 2010, he made his debut for the youth team at Hartlepool United, shortly before his 17th birthday. He made a promising start to life at a professional club in his first two years at the club and played regularly for the reserves either at left back or in left midfield.

=== Hartlepool United ===
He was handed his first team professional debut for the club aged seventeen by Mick Wadsworth on 22 April 2011 in the last game of the 2010–11 season in a 1–1 draw with Tranmere Rovers in League One, alongside other youth team debutant Josh Rowbotham.

In April 2012, he signed his first professional contract with the club having made 14 appearances for Michael Barron's reserve team and 19 appearances for the youth team during the 2011–12 season.

Holden was rewarded with a new contract in December 2012 to keep him at Victoria Park after impressing new boss John Hughes, having been around the first team for the majority of the campaign. He went on to make 17 league appearances in the 2012–13 season which saw him challenging to keep the experienced left-back Evan Horwood out of the first-team. However, he could not help the club escape relegation to League Two, having been in the relegation zone for the majority of the campaign.

Holden became a regular in the second half of the 2013–14 season after a toe injury to regular left-back Neil Austin, which led to him starting in Pools' final twenty games of the season. In May 2014, Holden was rewarded with a new one-year contract with Hartlepool.

Holden was a regular in the matchday squads during the 2014–15 season but mainly utilised as an unused substitute, only playing in just eleven games as Hartlepool narrowly escaped relegation into non-league football, finishing in 22nd place. He failed to make an appearance for the team following the appointment of Ronnie Moore as manager in December 2014. In May 2015, it was announced that he would be released by Hartlepool at the end of his contract after five years at the club. He made a total of 61 first team appearances for the club.

=== Ross County ===
Holden swapped one Victoria Park for another when he signed a two-year contract for Scottish Premiership club Ross County in June 2015, becoming manager Jim McIntyre's fifth signing of the summer. Holden made his debut on 25 August 2015 in a 2–0 Scottish League Cup second round victory over Scottish League One side Ayr United. He scored his first senior goal in a 7–0 Scottish League Cup third round win over Scottish Championship side Falkirk on 22 September.

He left his contract at Ross County early by mutual consent in January 2016 having failed to make a league appearance for the club, although he was an unused substitute on a number of occasions.

=== Non-league ===
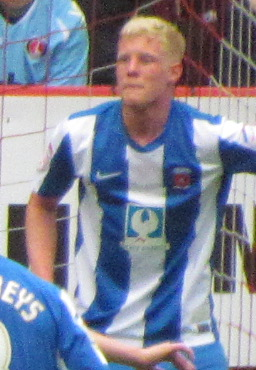
Holden with Hartlepool United in 2012

On 5 February 2016, Holden signed for National League side Gateshead on a deal until the end of the season, having previously trained with the club for a few days. He made his debut on 13 February as a second-half substitute for James Curtis in a 4–0 defeat to Dover Athletic at the Crabble Athletic Ground. He made a further six appearances before being released at the end of the season as Gateshead finished in 9th.

In July 2016, he spent a couple of weeks on trial in his birth-country with South African Premier Division club Mamelodi Sundowns, but a deal was never finalised. After being unattached for a while he had a short spell with Jarrow Roofing of Northern Football League Division One, signing for the club in late October 2016.

On 23 November 2016, he signed for divisional rivals South Shields who were challenging for the title. He was part of a successful side that won the quadruple during the 2016–17 campaign, finishing the season as champions with 108 points after overturning 17-point deficit on local rivals North Shields. This also included winning the Durham Challenge Cup, Northern League, League Cup (Holden was cup-tied) and the FA Vase, although Holden remained an unused substitute for the 4–0 win over Cleethorpes Town at Wembley Stadium.

Holden left South Shields following their promotion into the Northern Premier League and decided to stay in the Northern League when he signed for West Auckland Town in June 2017. He was only with the club until 13 October 2017, when he moved much higher up the pyramid to sign for National League side Guiseley. He made his first appearance for Guiseley in the FA Cup fourth-qualifying round 6–0 win over Northern League side Shildon, with manager, Paul Cox, describing his performance as an "excellent debut". He became a mainstay in the team but lost his place in the side during December and January. He regained his place at left back in the season run-in, making 22 appearances in all competitions. He couldn't stop Guiseley from finishing in bottom place which resulted in relegation to the National League North. Holden was one of fourteen players to be released at the end of the campaign as Guiseley looked to cut costs.

Following their relegation to the National League North, Holden was released from Guiseley and signed for Consett in 2018. After making 44 appearances in his first season with Consett, Holden signed a new contract to keep him with the club for a further year. He made a total of 133 appearances for Consett, scoring eleven times and also played for the club at Wembley Stadium in their 2020 FA Vase Final defeat.

On 12 October 2022, he signed for Northern Premier League Division One West side Clitheroe, making his debut against Bootle in a 4-0 win.

In December 2023, Holden signed for fellow Northern Premier League Division One West side Mossley. He spent only one season with Mossley and signed for Nelson in June 2024.

== Style of play ==
Holden is an attacking-minded left-back known for his long throws, fast pace, and having a strong left foot.

== Career statistics ==
As of match played 25 April 2026

Appearances and goals by club, season and competition
Club	Season	League			National Cup (Note: Includes FA Cup)		League Cup (Note: Includes Football League Cup, Scottish League Cup)		Other		Total	
Club	Season	Division	Apps	Goals	Apps	Goals	Apps	Goals	Apps	Goals	Apps	Goals
Hartlepool United	2010–11	League One	1	0	0	0	0	0	0	0	1	0
Hartlepool United	2011–12	League One	3	0	0	0	0	0	0	0	3	0
Hartlepool United	2012–13	League One	17	0	0	0	0	0	1 (Note: Appearances in Football League Trophy)	0	18	0
Hartlepool United	2013–14	League Two	26	0	0	0	1	0	1	0	28	0
Hartlepool United	2014–15	League Two	11	0	0	0	0	0	0	0	11	0
Hartlepool United	Total		58	0	0	0	1	0	2	0	61	0
Ross County	2015–16	Scottish Premiership	0	0	0	0	2	1	—		2	1
Gateshead	2015–16	National League	7	0	—		—		—		7	0
Guiseley	2017–18	National League	18	0	4	0	—		0	0	22	0
Consett	2018–19	NL Division One	32	2	4	0	—		8 (Note: 2 appearances in FA Vase, 4 in Northern League Cup, 2 in Durham Challenge Cup)	0	44	2
Consett	2019–20	NL Division One	24	2	2	0	—		10 (Note: 6 appearances and 1 goal in FA Vase, 1 in Northern League Cup, 3 appearances and 1 goal in Durham Challenge Cup)	2	36	4
Consett	2020–21	NL Division One	12	3	4	1	—		5 (Note: 4 appearances in FA Vase, 1 in Durham Challenge Cup)	0	21	4
Consett	2021–22	NL Division One	24	0	0	0	—		8 (Note: 3 appearances in FA Vase, 1 in Durham Challenge Cup, 4 appearances and goal in Northern League Division One Cup)	1	32	1
Consett	2022–23	NPL Division One East	7	0	0	0	—		2 (Note: Appearance in FA Trophy)	1	9	1
Consett	Total		99	7	10	1	—		33	4	142	12
Clitheroe	2022–23	NPL Division One West	26	0	—		—		1 (Note: Appearance in NPL Division One West play-offs)	0	27	0
Clitheroe	2023–24	NPL Division One West	11	0	1	0	—		0	0	12	0
Clitheroe	Total		37	0	1	0	—		1	0	39	0
Mossley	2023–24	NPL Division One West	20	0	—		—		—		20	0
Nelson	2024–25	North West Counties League; Division One North	29	2	0	0	0	0	5	0	34	2
Nelson	2025–26	North West Counties League; Division One North	33	1	0	0	0	0	18	2	51	3
Nelson	Total		62	3	0	0	—		23	2	85	5
Career total			301	10	15	1	3	1	59	6	378	18

== Honours ==
South Shields

- Northern Football League Division One: 2016–17
- FA Vase: 2016–17

Nelson

- North West Counties Football League Division One North: 2025–26
