= Darren Holden =

Darren Holden may refer to:

- Darren Holden (footballer) (born 1993), English footballer
- Darren Holden (musician) (born 1972), Irish musician
