= Nathan Luscombe =

English footballer

Personal information
- Full name: Nathan John Luscombe
- Date of birth: 6 November 1989 (age 36)
- Place of birth: Gateshead, England
- Height: 5 ft 8 in (1.73 m)
- Position: Winger

Youth career
- –2008: Sunderland

Senior career*
Years	Team	Apps	(Gls)
2008–2011	Sunderland	0	(0)
2011–2013	Hartlepool United	26	(1)
2013–2014	Celtic Nation	30	(1)
Total		56	(2)
- * Club domestic league appearances and goals

Nathan John Luscombe (born 6 November 1989) is an English former footballer who played as a winger.

== Career ==
Born in Gateshead, Tyne and Wear, Luscombe progressed through the Sunderland youth system and signed a professional contract on 1 July 2008. He made his first team debut on 4 February 2009 in an FA Cup fourth round tie against Blackburn Rovers, aged 19. He had a trial with Conference National club York City in November 2010, playing in a reserve team game against the Middlesbrough academy. He was amongst eight players to be released by Sunderland on 7 April 2011 and on 15 April he agreed to sign for League One side Hartlepool United on 1 July.

Luscombe came under scrutiny upon joining Hartlepool in 2011 after an image taken of the winger in pre-season training of the winger appearing overweight, after this Luscombe admitted that he was "embarrassed" by the image stating "I've always said I was ashamed when I came back. I was embarrassed to see a photo in one of the papers and I could have been a sumo wrestler, I was that big. It wasn't the fact I couldn't run, but it took me longer to get in shape where I could be at my best" and vowed to continue to lose weight with doing extra work in training.

He scored his first career goal in a 2–0 home win for Hartlepool against Exeter in September 2011. He made 13 league appearances at the end of his first season with Hartlepool.

Luscombe was excluded from Hartlepool's 2012 pre-season tour of Holland due to him returning to training overweight which left boss Neale Cooper "raging" and "unable to speak to him".

He was released by Hartlepool in May 2013 after making 26 league appearances for the club, 21 of which were substitute appearances.

He was signed by Northern League club Celtic Nation and played his first game for the side in a 1–1 draw at home to Bishop Auckland. Luscombe was released by Celtic Nation at the end of the season and ended up quitting football.

== Career statistics ==
Club	Season	League			FA Cup		League Cup		Other		Total	
Club	Season	Division	Apps	Goals	Apps	Goals	Apps	Goals	Apps	Goals	Apps	Goals
Sunderland	2008–09	Premier League	0	0	1	0	0	0	—		1	0
Sunderland	2009–10	Premier League	0	0	0	0	0	0	—		2	0
Sunderland	2010–11	Premier League	0	0	0	0	0	0	—		3	0
Sunderland	Total		0	0	1	0	0	0	—		1	0
Hartlepool United	2011–12	League One	13	1	1	0	1	0	1	0	16	1
Hartlepool United	2012–13	League One	13	0	0	0	0	0	0	0	13	0
Hartlepool United	Total		26	1	1	0	1	0	1	0	29	1
Celtic Nation	2013–14	Northern League Division One	30	1	0	0	0	0	6	1	36	2
Career totals			56	2	2	0	1	0	7	1	66	3
