= 2008–09 Sunderland A.F.C. season =

English football club season

Sunderland A.F.C.
2008–09 season
- Chairman: Niall Quinn
- Manager: Roy Keane (until 4 December); Ricky Sbragia (from 4 December)
- Stadium: Stadium of Light
- Premier League: 16th
- FA Cup: Fourth round
- League Cup: Fourth round
- Top goalscorer: League: Kenwyne Jones and Djibril Cissé (10) each All: Kenwyne Jones (12)

The 2008–09 season was the 112th season in Sunderland A.F.C.'s history and 104th in the league system of English football.

== Background ==
In preparation for their Premier League campaign, Sunderland spent around £40,000,000 in the 2007–08 season. Signings included the club's record signing of Craig Gordon for £9,000,000, Michael Chopra for £5,000,000, and Kieran Richardson for an undisclosed fee believed to be in the region of £5,500,000. Roy Keane began his managerial tenure in the Premier League with a win over Tottenham Hotspur through a last minute goal from Michael Chopra. In an attempt to bolster their goalscoring chances, Sunderland signed Kenwyne Jones from Southampton for £6,000,000. The club came close to their first Tyne-Wear derby victory at home in 17 years when they drew with Newcastle United. They had taken the lead before half time, but James Milner equalised an hour into the game. Michael Chopra missed the opportunity to win the game by heading the ball onto the crossbar.

A tribute was paid to 1973 FA Cup Final goalscorer Ian Porterfield in a game against Reading. Sunderland marked the occasion by winning 2–1. A win over Aston Villa sparked a three-game winning streak, when Sunderland overcame West Ham United and Fulham to extend their lead over the relegation area. They sealed their Premier League safety in a 3–2 win over local rivals Middlesbrough through a 90th-minute goal from Daryl Murphy. They finished the season in fifteenth place, on 39 points.

== Match results ==
=== Legend ===
Win	Draw	Loss

=== Pre-season ===
Game	Date	Opponent	Venue	Result	Attendance	Goalscorers	Notes
1	20 July 2008	Sporting CP	Away	3–1	—	O'Donovan, Nosworthy, Stokes	
2	22 July 2008	Vitória de Setúbal	Away	1–1	—	Richardson	
3	28 July 2008	Cobh Ramblers	Away	4–0	—	Murphy, Stokes (2), O'Donovan	
4	30 July 2008	Nottingham Forest	Away	1–0	12,573	Richardson	
5	3 August 2008	Ajax	Home	0–1	19,768		
6	7 August 2008	Athlone Town	Away	6–0	—	Richardson, Chopra (2), Leadbitter, Diouf, Murphy	
7	9 August 2008	Shamrock Rovers	Away	Postponed	—		

=== Premier League ===
==== League table ====
Pos	Team	Pld	W	D	L	GF	GA	GD	Pts	Qualification or relegation
14	Portsmouth	38	10	11	17	38	57	−19	41	
15	Blackburn Rovers	38	10	11	17	40	60	−20	41	
16	Sunderland	38	9	9	20	34	54	−20	36	
17	Hull City	38	8	11	19	39	64	−25	35	
18	Newcastle United (R)	38	7	13	18	40	59	−19	34	Relegation to Football League Championship

Source: Barclays Premier League
Rules for classification: 1) points; 2) goal difference; 3) number of goals scored.
(R) Relegated

==== Results summary ====
Overall								Home						Away					
Pld	W	D	L	GF	GA	GD	Pts	W	D	L	GF	GA	GD	W	D	L	GF	GA	GD
38	9	9	20	34	54	−20	36	6	3	10	21	25	−4	3	6	10	13	29	−16

Last updated: 4 December 2018.
Source: 11v11

==== Results per matchday ====
Matchday	1	2	3	4	5	6	7	8	9	10	11	12	13	14	15	16	17	18	19	20	21	22	23	24	25	26	27	28	29	30	31	32	33	34	35	36	37	38
Ground	H	A	H	A	H	A	H	A	H	A	A	H	A	H	H	A	H	A	H	A	A	H	H	A	H	A	A	H	H	A	A	H	H	A	H	A	A	H
Result	L	W	L	D	W	L	D	D	W	L	L	L	W	L	L	L	W	W	D	L	D	L	W	D	W	D	L	D	L	L	L	L	W	L	L	D	L	L
Position	18	12	18	16	6	11	14	12	9	10	14	17	11	16	18	18	17	12	14	15	13	14	11	13	11	10	12	13	14	14	17	17	15	15	16	16	16	16

Source: Statto.com
A = Away; H = Home; W = Win; D = Draw; L = Loss

Game	Date	Opponent	Venue	Result	Attendance	Goalscorers	Notes
1	16 August 2008	Liverpool	Home	0–1	43,259		
2	23 August 2008	Tottenham Hotspur	Away	2–1	36,064	Richardson, Cissé	
3	31 August 2008	Manchester City	Home	0–3	39,622		
4	13 September 2008	Wigan Athletic	Away	1–1	18,015	Bramble (O.G.)	
5	20 September 2008	Middlesbrough	Home	2–0	38,388	Chopra (2)	
6	27 September 2008	Aston Villa	Away	1–2	38,706	Cissé	
7	4 October 2008	Arsenal	Home	1–1	40,199	Leadbitter	
8	18 October 2008	Fulham	Away	0–0	25,116		
9	25 October 2008	Newcastle United	Home	2–1	47,936	Cissé, Richardson	
10	29 October 2008	Stoke City	Away	0–1	26,731		
11	1 November 2008	Chelsea	Away	0–5	41,693		
12	8 November 2008	Portsmouth	Home	1–2	37,712	Cissé	
13	15 November 2008	Blackburn Rovers	Away	2–1	21,798	Jones, Cissé	
14	23 November 2008	West Ham United	Home	0–1	35,222		
15	29 November 2008	Bolton Wanderers	Home	1–4	35,457	Cissé	
16	6 December 2008	Manchester United	Away	0–1	75,400		
17	13 December 2008	West Bromwich Albion	Home	4–0	36,280	Jones (2), Andy Reid, Cissé	
18	20 December 2008	Hull City	Away	4–1	24,917	Malbranque, Zayatte (O.G.), Jones, Cissé	
19	26 December 2008	Blackburn Rovers	Home	0–0	44,680		
20	28 December 2008	Everton	Away	0–3	39,146		
21	10 January 2009	Middlesbrough	Away	1–1	29,310	Jones	
22	17 January 2009	Aston Villa	Home	1–2	40,350	Collins	
23	27 January 2009	Fulham	Home	1–0	36,539	Jones	
24	1 February 2009	Newcastle	Away	1–1	52,084	Cissé	
25	7 February 2009	Stoke City	Home	2–0	38,350	Jones, Healy	
26	21 February 2009	Arsenal	Away	0–0	60,104		
27	3 March 2009	Liverpool	Away	0–2	41,587		
28	7 March 2009	Tottenham Hotspur	Home	1–1	37,894	Richardson	
29	14 March 2009	Wigan Athletic	Home	1–2	39,266	Leadbitter	
30	22 March 2009	Manchester City	Away	0–1	43,017		
31	4 April 2009	West Ham United	Away	0–2	34,761		
32	11 April 2009	Manchester United	Home	1–2	45,408	Jones	
33	18 April 2009	Hull City	Home	1–0	42,855	Cissé	
34	25 April 2009	West Bromwich Albion	Away	0–3	26,256		
35	3 May 2009	Everton	Home	0–2	41,313		
36	9 May 2009	Bolton Wanderers	Away	0–0	24,005		
37	18 May 2009	Portsmouth	Away	1–3	20,398	Jones	
38	24 May 2009	Chelsea	Home	2–3	42,468	Richardson, Jones	

=== FA Cup ===
Round	Date	Opponent	Venue	Result	Attendance	Goalscorers	Notes
3	3 January 2009	Bolton Wanderers	Home	2–1	20,685	Jones, Cissé	
4	24 January 2009	Blackburn Rovers	Home	0–0	22,634		
4	4 February 2009	Blackburn Rovers	Away	1–2 (replay)	10,112	Healy	

=== League Cup ===
Round	Date	Opponent	Venue	Result	Attendance	Goalscorers	Notes
2	27 August 2008	Nottingham Forest	Away	2–1 (aet)	9,198	Bardsley, Healy	
3	23 September 2008	Northampton Town	Home	2–2; 4–3 (pen)	21,082	Stokes (2)	
4	12 November 2008	Blackburn Rovers	Home	1–2	18,555	Jones	

== Players ==
=== First-team squad ===
Squad at end of season.

Note: Flags indicate national team as defined under FIFA eligibility rules; some limited exceptions apply. Players may hold more than one non-FIFA nationality.

No.	Pos.	Nation	Player
1	GK	SCO	Craig Gordon
2	DF	ENG	Phil Bardsley (Note: Bardsley was born in Salford, England, but also qualifies to represent Scotland internationally through his father and would make his international debut for Scotland in October 2010.)
3	DF	NIR	George McCartney
4	MF	FIN	Teemu Tainio
5	DF	JAM	Nyron Nosworthy (Note: Nosworthy was born in Lambeth, England, but also qualified to represent Jamaica internationally through his father and Guyana through his mother and was called up by Jamaica in 2007 before making his international debut for Jamaica in May 2012.)
6	MF	ENG	Dean Whitehead (captain)
7	MF	TTO	Carlos Edwards
8	MF	FRA	Steed Malbranque (Note: Malbranque was born in Mouscron, Belgium, but also qualified to represent France internationally and has represented them at U-16, U-18, and U-21 level.)
9	FW	FRA	Djibril Cissé (on loan from Marseille)
10	MF	ENG	Kieran Richardson
12	DF	ISR	Tal Ben Haim (on loan from Manchester City)
13	GK	WAL	Darren Ward (Note: Ward was born in Worksop, England, but also qualified to represent Wales internationally and made his international debut for Wales in June 2000.)
14	FW	IRL	Daryl Murphy
15	DF	WAL	Danny Collins (Note: Collins was born in Chester, England, and represented the England C team, but also qualifies to represent Wales internationally and made his international debut for Wales in February 2005.)
17	FW	TTO	Kenwyne Jones
18	MF	ENG	Grant Leadbitter
19	MF	TTO	Dwight Yorke
20	MF	IRL	Andy Reid
21	DF	ENG	Calum Davenport (on loan from West Ham United)
23	FW	NIR	David Healy

No.	Pos.	Nation	Player
24	GK	NIR	Trevor Carson
25	DF	FRA	Jean-Yves Mvoto
26	DF	ENG	Anton Ferdinand
29	DF	ENG	Peter Hartley
30	DF	IRL	Paul McShane
31	FW	IRL	David Connolly (Note: Connolly was born in Brent, England, but also qualified to represent the Republic of Ireland internationally and made his international debut for the Republic of Ireland in May 1996.)
32	GK	HUN	Márton Fülöp
34	MF	ENG	Jack Colback
35	DF	ENG	Michael Kay
36	MF	ENG	Nathan Luscombe
37	MF	NIR	Robbie Weir
38	MF	ENG	Jamie Chandler
39	FW	ENG	Martyn Waghorn
40	FW	ENG	David Dowson
41	MF	IRL	David Meyler
43	MF	IRL	Conor Hourihane
44	FW	IRL	Anthony Stokes
45	MF	ENG	Jordan Cook
46	GK	IRL	Nick Colgan

=== Left club during season ===
Note: Flags indicate national team as defined under FIFA eligibility rules; some limited exceptions apply. Players may hold more than one non-FIFA nationality.

No.	Pos.	Nation	Player
11	FW	SEN	El Hadji Diouf (to Blackburn Rovers)
12	MF	IRL	Liam Miller (to Queens Park Rangers)
16	FW	ENG	Michael Chopra (on loan to Cardiff City)
21	DF	FRA	Pascal Chimbonda (to Tottenham Hotspur)
22	DF	ENG	Danny Higginbotham (to Stoke City)
26	MF	NGR	Dickson Etuhu (to Fulham)
27	DF	SCO	Russell Anderson (on loan to Burnley)
28	MF	IRL	Graham Kavanagh (to Carlisle United)

No.	Pos.	Nation	Player
33	DF	IRL	Michael Liddle (Note: Liddle was born in Hounslow, Belgium, but also qualifies to represent the Republic of Ireland internationally and has represented them at U-21 level.) (on loan to Carlisle United)
42	MF	ENG	Jordan Henderson (on loan to Coventry City)
45	FW	SWE	Rade Prica (to Rosenborg)
—	MF	SCO	Ross Wallace (to Preston North End)
—	MF	ESP	Arnau Riera (on loan to Falkirk)
—	DF	ENG	Greg Halford (on loan to Sheffield United)
—	FW	IRL	Roy O'Donovan (on loan to Blackpool)

== Statistics ==
=== Appearances and goals ===
No.	Pos	Nat	Player	Total		Premier League		FA Cup		League Cup	
No.	Pos	Nat	Player	Apps	Goals	Apps	Goals	Apps	Goals	Apps	Goals
Goalkeepers
1	GK	(Scotland) SCO	Craig Gordon	14	0	12	0	1	0	1	0
32	GK	(Hungary) HUN	Márton Fülöp	30	0	26	0	2	0	2	0
Defenders
2	DF	(England) ENG	Phil Bardsley	33	1	27+1	0	1+1	0	3	1
3	DF	(Northern Ireland) NIR	George McCartney	18	0	16	0	1+1	0	0	0
5	DF	(Jamaica) JAM	Nyron Nosworthy	20	0	16	0	1	0	3	0
7	DF	(Trinidad and Tobago) TTO	Carlos Edwards	26	0	6+16	0	3	0	1	0
12	DF	(Israel) ISR	Tal Ben Haim	5	0	5	0	0	0	0	0
15	DF	(Wales) WAL	Danny Collins	41	1	35	1	3	0	3	0
21	DF	(England) ENG	Calum Davenport	8	0	7+1	0	0	0	0	0
26	DF	(England) ENG	Anton Ferdinand	36	0	31	0	3	0	2	0
30	DF	(Republic of Ireland) IRL	Paul McShane	3	0	0+3	0	0	0	0	0
35	DF	(England) ENG	Michael Kay	1	0	0	0	1	0	0	0
Midfielders
4	MF	(Finland) FIN	Teemu Tainio	22	0	18+3	0	0+1	0	0	0
6	MF	(England) ENG	Dean Whitehead	38	0	30+4	0	1	0	3	0
8	MF	(France) FRA	Steed Malbranque	40	1	34+2	1	2	0	2	0
10	MF	(England) ENG	Kieran Richardson	35	4	31+1	4	1	0	1+1	0
18	MF	(England) ENG	Grant Leadbitter	28	2	12+11	2	2	0	1+2	0
20	MF	(Republic of Ireland) IRL	Andy Reid	38	1	20+12	1	2+1	0	2+1	0
36	MF	(England) ENG	Nathan Luscombe	1	0	0	0	0+1	0	0	0
42	MF	(England) ENG	Jordan Henderson	2	0	0+1	0	0	0	1	0
Forwards
9	FW	(France) FRA	Djibril Cissé	38	11	29+6	10	1	1	2	0
14	FW	(Republic of Ireland) IRL	Daryl Murphy	27	0	6+17	0	1	0	2+1	0
17	FW	(Trinidad and Tobago) TTO	Kenwyne Jones	32	12	25+4	10	1+1	1	1	1
19	FW	(Trinidad and Tobago) TTO	Dwight Yorke	8	0	4+3	0	0+1	0	0	0
23	FW	(Northern Ireland) NIR	David Healy	14	3	0+10	1	2	1	1+1	1
39	FW	(England) ENG	Martyn Waghorn	1	0	1	0	0	0	0	0
44	FW	(Republic of Ireland) IRL	Anthony Stokes	3	2	0+2	0	0	0	0+1	2
Players transferred out during the season
11	FW	(Senegal) SEN	El Hadji Diouf	16	0	11+3	0	1	0	1	0
12	MF	(Republic of Ireland) IRL	Liam Miller	4	0	1+2	0	0	0	0+1	0
16	FW	(England) ENG	Michael Chopra	8	2	1+5	2	1	0	0+1	0
21	DF	(France) FRA	Pascal Chimbonda	16	0	13	0	2	0	1	0
22	DF	(England) ENG	Danny Higginbotham	1	0	1	0	0	0	0	0

Last updated: 31 May 2009
Source: Competitions

=== Goal scorers ===
Nation	Number	Name	Premier League	League Cup	FA Cup	Total
(Trinidad and Tobago)	17	Kenwyne Jones	10	1	1	12
(France)	9	Djibril Cissé	10	0	1	11
(England)	10	Kieran Richardson	4	0	0	4
(Northern Ireland)	23	David Healy	1	1	1	3
(England)	18	Grant Leadbitter	2	0	0	2
(England)	16	Michael Chopra	2	0	0	2
(Republic of Ireland)	44	Anthony Stokes	0	2	0	2
/	/	Own goals	2	0	0	2
(France)	8	Steed Malbranque	1	0	0	1
(Wales)	15	Danny Collins	1	0	0	1
(Republic of Ireland)	20	Andy Reid	1	0	0	1
(England)	2	Phil Bardsley	0	1	0	1
/	/	TOTALS	34	5	3	42

== Transfers ==
=== In ===
Date	Pos	Name	From	Fee	Notes
4 June 2008	DF	Michael Kay	Youth system	–	
4 June 2008	MF	Jordan Henderson	Youth system	–	
4 June 2008	MF	Nathan Luscombe	Youth system	–	
4 June 2008	FW	Jordan Cook	Youth system	–	
4 June 2008	DF	Michael Liddle	Youth system	–	
4 June 2008	MF	Jack Colback	Youth system	–	
4 June 2008	DF	Niall McArdle	Youth system	–	
23 July 2008	MF	Teemu Tainio	Tottenham Hotspur	Undisclosed fee	
24 July 2008	GK	Nick Colgan	Ipswich Town	Free	
25 July 2008	MF	David Meyler	Cork City	Undisclosed fee	
26 July 2008	DF	Pascal Chimbonda	Tottenham Hotspur	Undisclosed fee	
28 July 2008	FW	El Hadji Diouf	Bolton Wanderers	Undisclosed fee	
30 July 2008	MF	Steed Malbranque	Tottenham Hotspur	Undisclosed fee	
21 August 2008	FW	David Healy	Fulham	Undisclosed fee	
27 August 2008	DF	Anton Ferdinand	West Ham United	Undisclosed fee	
1 September 2008	DF	George McCartney	West Ham United	Undisclosed fee	

=== Out ===
Date	Pos	Name	To	Fee	Notes
8 May 2008	DF	Stephen Wright	Coventry City	Released	
8 May 2008	DF	Ian Harte	–	Released	
8 May 2008	DF	Stanislav Varga	–	Released	
8 May 2008	FW	Andy Cole	Nottingham Forest	Free	
8 May 2008	DF	Gavin Donogue	–	Released	
8 May 2008	MF	Billy Dennehy	–	Released	
8 May 2008	MF	Jake Richardson	–	Released	
8 May 2008	DF	Jack Pelter	–	Released	
29 August 2008	MF	Dickson Etuhu	Fulham	Undisclosed fee	
1 September 2008	DF	Danny Higginbotham	Stoke City	Undisclosed fee	
9 January 2009	MF	Graham Kavanagh	Carlisle United	Mutual consent	
12 January 2009	MF	Ross Wallace	Preston North End	Undisclosed fee	
15 January 2009	MF	Liam Miller	Queens Park Rangers	Undisclosed fee	
26 January 2009	DF	Pascal Chimbonda	Tottenham Hotspur	Undisclosed fee	
30 January 2009	FW	El Hadji Diouf	Blackburn Rovers	Undisclosed fee	

=== Loans in ===
Date	Pos	Name	From	Length	Notes
21 August 2008	FW	Djibril Cissé	Marseille	End of season	
1 February 2009	DF	Tal Ben Haim	Manchester City	End of season	
2 February 2009	DF	Calum Davenport	West Ham United	End of season	

=== Loans out ===
Date	Pos	Name	To	Length	Notes
2 July 2008	DF	Greg Halford	Sheffield United	End of season	
22 July 2008	MF	Arnau Riera	Falkirk	End of season	
31 July 2008	MF	Ross Wallace	Preston North End	End of season	
8 August 2008	FW	Roy O'Donovan	Dundee United	End of season	
14 August 2008	GK	Trevor Carson	Chesterfield	19 December 2008	
27 August 2008	DF	Russell Anderson	Burnley	End of season	
30 August 2008	DF	Paul McShane	Hull City	15 January 2009	
2 October 2008	MF	Carlos Edwards	Wolverhampton Wanderers	20 November 2008	
10 October 2008	MF	Graham Kavanagh	Carlisle United	3 January 2009	
17 October 2008	FW	Anthony Stokes	Sheffield United	1 January 2009	
6 November 2008	FW	Michael Chopra	Cardiff City	1 January 2009	
14 November 2008	DF	Michael Liddle	Carlisle United	End of season	
17 November 2008	FW	Martyn Waghorn	Charlton Athletic	17 January 2009	
9 January 2009	FW	Roy O'Donovan	Blackpool	End of season	
28 January 2009	MF	Jordan Henderson	Coventry City	End of season	
2 February 2009	FW	Michael Chopra	Cardiff City	End of season	
2 March 2009	FW	Anthony Stokes	Crystal Palace	End of season	
2 March 2009	GK	Darren Ward	Wolverhampton Wanderers	End of season	

== See also ==
- 2008–09 in English football
