= Greg Rutherford (footballer) =

English footballer

Personal information
- Date of birth: 17 May 1994 (age 32)
- Place of birth: Whitley Bay, England
- Positions: Attacking midfielder; striker

Youth career
- 2010–2012: Hartlepool United

Senior career*
Years	Team	Apps	(Gls)
2011–2014	Hartlepool United	9	(1)
2014–2015	Dover Athletic	3	(0)
2015	Alloa Athletic	8	(0)
2015–2016	Arbroath	25	(3)
2016–2017	Berwick Rangers	33	(9)
2017–2018	Blyth Spartans	11	(4)
2018	Spennymoor Town	5	(0)
2018–2020	Whitby Town	25	(2)
2020–2022	Bishop Auckland	8	(2)
Total		127	(21)
- * Club domestic league appearances and goals

Greg David Rutherford (born 17 May 1994) is an English former footballer who played as an attacking midfielder. He now works as a personal trainer.

Rutherford began his career in the English Football League for Hartlepool United whom he played for in League One and League Two. Upon departing Hartlepool, Greg played for Dover Athletic during the 2014–15 Football Conference season. From 2015 until 2017, Rutherford played in the Scottish Professional Football League for Alloa Athletic, Arbroath and Berwick Rangers. After leaving Berwick, Rutherford played in the English non-leagues for Blyth Spartans, Spennymoor Town, Whitby Town and Bishop Auckland.

== Career ==
Rutherford was born in North Shields. He started his career in the youth team of Hartlepool United on a two-year scholarship in the summer of 2010. In April 2012, Rutherford was offered his first professional contract. On 14 April 2012, he made his professional debut in a 2–1 defeat to Chesterfield, coming on as a late substitute for Gary Liddle.

Rutherford then signed a short-term deal in the summer of 2012, which was later extended in early January 2013. He scored his first professional goal after only being on the pitch for 90 seconds in a 3–1 away win against Portsmouth on 26 January 2013. At the end of the 2013–14 season, Rutherford was one of four players released by Hartlepool.

Rutherford signed for Conference side Dover Athletic in October 2014.

On 2 February 2015, Rutherford signed for Scottish Championship club Alloa Athletic. While playing for Berwick Rangers, Rutherford won the Scottish League Two player of the month award for March 2017.

Rutherford was signed by Blyth Spartans in October 2017 after being released by Berwick.

In 2018, Rutherford signed for Whitby Town and scored twice on his debut in a 2–0 win over Marske United. Rutherford struggled with injuries during his time at Whitby; during the 2019–20 season, he went off injured in his only league start for the club that season and only made a further three starts before the season was ended early due to the coronavirus pandemic.

In 2020, Rutherford signed for Bishop Auckland in Northern Football League Division One.

== Personal life ==
Rutherford retired from football in 2022 to focus on his role as a personal trainer.

Greg married Australian married at first sight star Olivia Frazer on 03/07/2026.

== Career statistics ==
As of match played 26 December 2017

Appearances and goals by club, season and competition
Club	Season	League			National Cup		League Cup		Other		Total	
Club	Season	Division	Apps	Goals	Apps	Goals	Apps	Goals	Apps	Goals	Apps	Goals
Hartlepool United	2011–12	League One	1	0	0	0	0	0	0	0	1	0
Hartlepool United	2012–13	League One	7	1	0	0	0	0	0	0	7	1
Hartlepool United	2013–14	League Two	1	0	0	0	0	0	0	0	1	0
Hartlepool United	Total		9	1	0	0	0	0	0	0	9	1
Dover Athletic	2014–15	Conference Premier	3	0	0	0	—		0	0	3	0
Alloa Athletic	2014–15	Scottish Championship	8	0	0	0	0	0	0	0	8	0
Arbroath	2015–16	Scottish League Two	25	3	3	0	0	0	0	0	28	3
Berwick Rangers	2016–17	Scottish League Two	26	9	0	0	0	0	0	0	26	9
Berwick Rangers	2017–18	Scottish League Two	7	0	0	0	4	1	2 (Note: Appearances in Scottish Challenge Cup)	0	13	1
Berwick Rangers	Total		33	9	0	0	4	1	2	0	39	10
Blyth Spartans	2017–18	National League North	6	2	0	0	—		1 (Note: Appearance in FA Trophy)	0	7	2
Career total			84	15	3	0	4	1	3	0	94	16

== Honours ==
Individual

- Scottish League Two Player of the Month: March 2017.
