= Samuel Adjei =

Swedish footballer

Personal information
- Full name: Samuel Adjei
- Date of birth: 11 March 1993 (age 33)
- Place of birth: Eksjö, Sweden
- Height: 6 ft 1 in (1.85 m)
- Position: Forward

Youth career
- 2008–2009: Jönköpings Södra IF
- 2009–2011: Newcastle United

Senior career*
Years	Team	Apps	(Gls)
2011–2012	Newcastle United	0	(0)
2012	→ Hartlepool United (loan)	1	(0)
2012–2015	Jönköpings Södra IF	1	(0)

International career^{‡}
2008	Sweden U17	4	(0)
2009	Sweden U19	1	(0)
- * Club domestic league appearances and goals as of 05:00, 3 December 2017 (UTC) ‡ National team caps and goals as of 07:58, 8 September 2012 (UTC)

Samuel Adjei (born 18 January 1992) is a Swedish footballer of Ghanaian descent.

== Career ==
Adjei was born in Eksjö, Sweden. He was discovered as a 12-year-old by lower league Swedish club Waggeryds IK. In January 2009, Premier League side Newcastle United signed Adjei from Swedish Second Division club Jönköpings Södra IF for a significant fee. He then quickly made an impression in his new surroundings by playing in a first team friendly against Huddersfield Town in August 2009. At Newcastle United, Adjei spent three years developing, but soon suffered a nightmare time with injury and failing to progress during the periods when he has been fit.

On 2 March 2012, Adjei joined Football League One side Hartlepool United on month-long loan deal. He made his debut for Pool on 3 March, in a 1–1 draw with Milton Keynes Dons, coming on as a substitute for James Poole. However, playing 30 minutes on his debut, Adjei soon suffered an hamstring injury, which leave him out for three-four weeks and also made a return to his parent club. At the end of the season, Adjei was released by the club when his contract has expired

After seven months without a club, Adjei returned to Swedish by joining Jönköpings Södra IF, the team he started his football career, on a two-year contract. After the move, Adjei says returning to the club made him a better player and insists he made a right decision to join Newcastle United in the press conference.
