= Diego Karg =

Dutch footballer

Personal information
- Full name: Diego Karg
- Date of birth: 9 August 1990 (age 36)
- Place of birth: Arnhem, Netherlands
- Height: 1.86 m (6 ft 1 in)
- Position: Striker

Youth career
- ESA
- FC Den Bosch

Senior career*
Years	Team	Apps	(Gls)
2007–2012	FC Den Bosch	13	(1)
2012–2014	Telstar	16	(0)
2014–2015	FC Eindhoven	18	(2)
- * Club domestic league appearances and goals as of 10 May 2015 (UTC)

Diego Karg (born 9 August 1990 in Arnhem) is a Dutch professional footballer who plays as a striker. He formerly played for FC Den Bosch, Telstar and FC Eindhoven.
