= Paul Johnson (footballer, born 1992) =

English footballer (born 1992)

Personal information
- Date of birth: 5 April 1992 (age 34)
- Place of birth: Sunderland, England
- Height: 6 ft 0 in (1.83 m)
- Position: Central defender

Youth career
- 2004–2010: Hartlepool United

Senior career*
Years	Team	Apps	(Gls)
2010–2013	Hartlepool United	1	(0)
2010	→ Garforth Town (loan)	?	(?)
2011–2012	→ Workington (loan)	12	(1)
2012	→ Darlington (loan)	9	(0)
2013	→ Workington (loan)	17	(0)
2013–2014	Celtic Nation		
2014–	Spennymoor Town		
- * Club domestic league appearances and goals as of 04:10, 17 November 2014 (UTC)

Paul Johnson (born 5 April 1992) is an English former professional footballer who plays for Spennymoor Town as a central defender.

== Career ==
=== Hartlepool United ===
Born in Sunderland, Johnson joined Hartlepool United at the age of 12. He turned professional in 2010, making his senior debut in April 2011.

In May 2011 he signed a new contract with the club. The next season, he had a successful three-month loan spell at Conference North side Workington, where he received praise from the Reds' manager Darren Edmondson: "Paul has been fantastic for us, he's grown as a player and learned more about the game than playing meaningless Reserve games. It's been a pleasure to aid his development. He returns to Hartlepool an improved footballer and shows what effect the non league can have on the development of young talent."

Johnson was an unused substitute in a 2–1 win away at Bury shortly before he was loaned to local rivals Darlington for the rest of the season. He made his debut a day later as he played the full match in a 0–2 league defeat to Ebbsfleet United.

He rejoined Workington on loan in February 2013, making 17 appearances for the club.

Johnson was released by Hartlepool at the end of the 2012–13 season.

=== Non-league ===
After his release from Hartlepool, it was reported that Workington boss Darren Edmondson had tried to get Johnson to join Workington permanently but hit a stumbling block due to wages.

Johnson joined Carlisle-based Northern League side Celtic Nation in June, on a one-year deal, where he was reunited with Mick Wadsworth who was Johnson's coach at Hartlepool United.

Johnson left Celtic Nation to join Spennymoor Town in the summer of 2014.
