= Callum Hassan =

English footballer (born 1993)

Personal information
- Date of birth: 23 January 1993 (age 33)
- Place of birth: Southwark, England
- Height: 6 ft 4 in (1.93 m)
- Position: Forward

Youth career
- 2009–2011: Hartlepool United

Senior career*
| Years | Team | Apps | (Gls) |
| 2011–2012 | Hartlepool United | 1 | (0) |
| 2011 | → Harrogate Town (loan) | 7 | (2) |
| 2011 | → Whitby Town (loan) | 5 | (1) |
| 2012 | Workington | 1 | (0) |
| 2012 | Blyth Spartans | 4 | (0) |
| 2012 | Bishop Auckland | 5 | (0) |
| 2012 | West Auckland Town | 0 | (0) |
| 2013 | Billingham Synthonia | 9 | (1) |
| 2014 | Harrogate Town | 2 | (1) |
| 2014 | → Whitby Town (loan) | 1 | (0) |
| 2015 | Kidderminster Harriers | 3 | (1) |
| 2015 | Telford United | 9 | (0) |
| 2016 | Witton Albion | 3 | (2) |
| 2017 | West Auckland Town | 10 | (4) |
| 2017 | Billingham Synthonia | 8 | (2) |
| 2018 | Colwyn Bay | 10 | (4) |
| 2019 | West Auckland Town | | |
| 2019 | Witton Albion | | |
| 2021 | Widnes | 2 | (0) |
| 2021–2022 | Runcorn Town | | |
- * Club domestic league appearances and goals as of 20:56, 18 February 2022 (UTC)

Callum Hassan (born 23 January 1993), known as Cal Hassan, is an English footballer.

== Career ==
On 15 August 2011, Hassan joined Conference North side Harrogate Town on a month-long loan deal, where he scored twice from seven league appearances. A month later he was again sent out on loan, this time to Whitby Town, where he played three times in the Northern Premier League and scored an equalising goal against North Ferriby United in the FA Cup to help Whitby progress to the third qualifying round.

Hassan made his senior debut for Hartlepool on 14 January 2012 against Exeter City in Football League One, coming on as a substitute for James Brown in the 80th minute. Hassan was released on 10 May 2012.

After his release from Hartlepool, Callum went on trial with Huddersfield Town, Notts County, Workington and Whitby Town. He signed for Conference North side Workington in August 2012 on a pay-as-you-play deal after being recommended to Workington boss Darren Edmondson by his former Hartlepool coach Mick Wadsworth.

In September 2012, Hassan moved again to Northern Premier League side Blyth Spartans on a free transfer. He scored his first goal for Blyth in the F.A. Trophy first qualifying round in a 4–1 defeat to Witton Albion but left the club in mid October.

Callum then moved to Northern League side Bishop Auckland where he played his game on 2 November in a 4–0 defeat to Spennymoor Town coming on as a half-time substitute. It was announced via Bishop Auckland's Twitter account on 26 November that he had been released by the club.

In early December 2012 Callum signed for Bishops local Northern League rivals West Auckland.

In March 2013, Hassan joined Billingham Synthonia and he scored his first goal for the Synners in a 2–0 win against Sunderland RCA. In 2014, the forward rejoined Harrogate Town and was released in October 2014.

In 2015, Hassan began trials with Portsmouth and impressed fans with a brief appearance in a 1–1 draw against neighbours Havant & Waterlooville at Westleigh Park. In October 2015, Hassan joined Kidderminster Harriers on a short-term deal and scored on his first start for the club. Callum has gained cult status with local fans due to his unusually strong physique and outstanding work rate.

In August 2018, Hassan joined Colwyn Bay in Wales. He then returned to West Auckland Town, before returning to one of his other former clubs in August 2019, Witton Albion. where he stayed until September.

In 2021 he returned to the game, first signing for Widnes in November 2021 before moving to Runcorn Town at the end of December.

== Personal life ==
Born in Southwark lin 1993, Hassan was adopted as a baby and relocated to Hartlepool with his mum, Ann. Hassan went through the junior ranks at Middlesbrough Football Club before signing with Hartlepool United under-16s. Callum is now enjoying a luxury life after setting up his wealth management company.
