= Josh Rowbotham =

English footballer

Personal information
- Full name: Joshua James Rowbotham
- Date of birth: 7 January 1994 (age 32)
- Place of birth: Stockton-on-Tees, England
- Position: Defender

Team information
- Current team: FC Hartlepool

Youth career
- 2003–2014: Hartlepool United

Senior career*
Years	Team	Apps	(Gls)
2011–2014	Hartlepool United	2	(0)
2014	Guisborough Town		
2014–2015	West Auckland Town		
2015–2017	Billingham Synthonia	83	(5)
2017–2018	Marske United		
2018–2019	Guisborough Town		
2019–2020	Billingham Synthonia		
2020–2021	Redcar Athletic		
2021–2022	Marske United		
2022–2024	Bishop Auckland	10	(2)
2024–2025	Guisborough Town		
2025–2026	Seaton Carew		
2026–	FC Hartlepool	2	(0)
- * Club domestic league appearances and goals

Joshua James Rowbotham (born 7 January 1994) is an English footballer who plays as a defender for FC Hartlepool.

Rowbotham played in EFL League One for Hartlepool United, the club he began his career with. After leaving Hartlepool in 2014, Rowbotham played semi-professionally for several non-league sides.

== Career ==
=== Hartlepool United ===
Born in Stockton-on-Tees, Rowbotham made his senior debut for Hartlepool United in April 2011. He signed a new contract with the club in May 2014. He left the club by mutual consent in October 2014 in order to pursue a career away from professional football; he had been at the club for 11 years.

=== Semi-professional career ===
After leaving Pools, Rowbotham played non-league football for Guisborough Town and West Auckland Town. He signed for Billingham Synthonia in February 2015, making 42 appearances for them in all competitions.

In June 2017, he joined Northern Premier League side Marske United. He remained with Marske for one season before re-joining Guisborough Town. After leaving Guisborough in 2019, he re-joined another his of his former sides Billingham Synthonia. In 2020, he joined Redcar Athletic but returned to Marske in 2021. After leaving Marske, Rowbotham joined Bishop Auckland at the start of the 2022–23 season. He played ten times for Bishop Auckland, scoring twice.

On 9 August 2024, Rowbotham signed for Guisborough Town for the third time. In January 2025, Rowbotham began playing in the Wearside Football League for the first time when he signed for Seaton Carew.

In March 2026, Rowbotham began playing his football in the Northern League again when he signed for FC Hartlepool. He made his debut for the club in a 2–1 home win against Redcar Town.

== Career statistics ==
Appearances and goals by club, season and competition
Club	Season	League			FA Cup		League Cup		Other		Total	
Club	Season	Division	Apps	Goals	Apps	Goals	Apps	Goals	Apps	Goals	Apps	Goals
Hartlepool United	2010–11	League One	1	0	0	0	0	0	0	0	1	0
Hartlepool United	2011–12	League One	1	0	0	0	0	0	0	0	1	0
Hartlepool United	2012–13	League One	0	0	0	0	0	0	0	0	0	0
Hartlepool United	2013–14	League Two	0	0	0	0	0	0	0	0	0	0
Hartlepool United	2014–15	League Two	0	0	0	0	0	0	0	0	0	0
Career total			2	0	0	0	0	0	0	0	2	0
