= Zak Boagey =

English footballer

Personal information
- Full name: Zak Boagey
- Date of birth: 11 October 1994 (age 32)
- Place of birth: Hartlepool, England
- Position: Forward

Team information
- Current team: Marske United

Youth career
- 2010–2012: Middlesbrough

Senior career*
Years	Team	Apps	(Gls)
2012–2014	Hartlepool United	1	(0)
2014	→ Whitby Town (loan)	4	(1)
2014–2016	Newton Aycliffe		
2017	West Auckland Town		
2017–	Marske United		
- * Club domestic league appearances and goals as of 28 June 2017 (UTC)

Zak Boagey (born 11 October 1994) is an English footballer who plays for Marske United.

== Career ==
Boagey began his career with Middlesbrough before joining Hartlepool United in November 2012. He made his professional debut on 6 April 2013 in a 2–0 victory over Bury.

Boagey scored a hat-trick in a pre-season friendly in July 2013 against Billingham Town in half an hour for Pools in a 5–0 win.

In March 2014, Boagey joined Northern Premier League side Whitby Town until the end of the season.
