= Andy Rafferty =

English footballer

Personal information
- Full name: Andrew James Rafferty
- Date of birth: 27 May 1988 (age 38)
- Place of birth: Sidcup, England
- Position: Goalkeeper

Senior career*
Years	Team	Apps	(Gls)
2006–2007	Darlington	0	(0)
2007–2008	Crook Town	30	(0)
2008	Horden Colliery Welfare		
2008–2010	Guisborough Town	49	(0)
2010–2014	Hartlepool United	5	(0)
2014–2016	Dover Athletic	37	(0)
2016–2017	Spennymoor Town		
- * Club domestic league appearances and goals as of 7 May 2016 (UTC)

Andrew James Rafferty (born 27 May 1988) is an English former footballer who played as a goalkeeper.

Rafferty played in League One for Hartlepool United making the step up from part-time side Guisborough Town. Following his departure from Hartlepool, Rafferty signed for National League side Dover Athletic before playing for part-time side Spennymoor Town.

== Club career ==
=== Early career ===
Rafferty started his career at Darlington but left the club aged 16. Upon leaving, Rafferty had trials at Southampton, Reading and Wigan Athletic but a broken finger left him unable to sign. He went to play part-time for Crook Town and Horden Colliery Welfare before joining Guisborough Town in 2008 and in two seasons he made 49 appearances for the club picking up the Player of the Year award in both seasons.

=== Hartlepool United ===
Rafferty joined Hartlepool United in the summer of 2010 from Guisborough Town. Shortly into the new season, Rafferty broke his hand and two bones in his finger in September 2010. When he returned from injury, Rafferty spent the majority of the season as back-up to Scott Flinders before making his Hartlepool United debut in a 1–1 draw against Tranmere Rovers in April 2011.

A knee injury during pre-season in the 2012–13 season ruled Rafferty out for the majority of the season which led to him undergoing an intricate operation to repair the patella tendon in his left knee and return to training for the first time at the start of March. He was named on the Hartlepool team-sheet as a substitute for the first time of the season in a 2–2 draw against Crawley Town on the final game of the season.

In April 2014, Rafferty made his first appearance of the season in a 1–0 defeat to Portsmouth in which he saved a penalty from Ryan Taylor. Rafferty made three further appearances before the end of the season. On 14 August 2014, he left Hartlepool United after his contract was cancelled by mutual consent.

=== Dover Athletic ===
On 19 September 2014 Rafferty joined National League side Dover Athletic. The team had a run of 16 unbeaten games both home and away, including in two FA Cup shock wins over Football League sides Morecambe and Cheltenham Town. Rafferty did not concede in his first 8 home appearances starting with the match against Alfreton Town and ending against Torquay United. Dover Athletic went on to reach the third round of the FA Cup and played at home against Premier League club Crystal Palace. Dover lost the match 4–0, Rafferty's performance earned him second place in The FA Cup's Third Round Top Five Saves. Dover beat Wrexham 2–0 on 20 January 2015 to maintain their record 13 games unbeaten.

Rafferty was part of the 2015/16 squad which achieved the club's highest finish in the National League, missing out to Forest Green Rovers in the play off semi-finals.

Rafferty was released by Dover at the end of the 2015/16 season.

=== Spennymoor Town ===
On 1 July 2016, Rafferty moved back to the North East to join newly promoted Northern Premier League Premier Division side, Spennymoor Town.

Rafferty left the club towards the end of the same season by mutual consent to start a new career outside of football.

== Personal life ==
In 2017, Rafferty made the switch from playing football to become a paramedic.
