= James Poole (footballer) =

English footballer

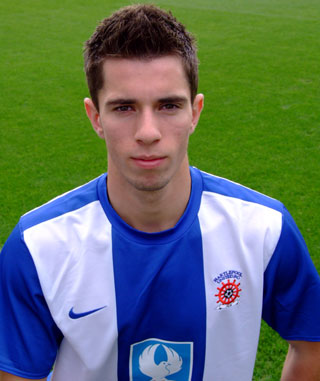

Personal information
- Full name: James Alexander Poole
- Date of birth: 20 March 1990 (age 36)
- Place of birth: Stockport, England
- Positions: Midfielder; striker

Team information
- Current team: Dandenong Thunder

Youth career
- 2005–2006: Macclesfield Town
- 2006–2008: Manchester City

Senior career*
Years	Team	Apps	(Gls)
2008–2011	Manchester City	0	(0)
2009–2010	→ Bury (loan)	9	(0)
2010–2011	→ Hartlepool United (loan)	3	(1)
2011–2014	Hartlepool United	96	(14)
2014–2015	Bury	4	(0)
2014–2015	→ Dover Athletic (loan)	17	(1)
2015–2017	Salford City	52	(21)
2017–2019	Altrincham	34	(2)
2019	→ Hyde United (loan)	4	(0)
2019–2021	Preston Lions	16	(5)
2022–	Dandenong Thunder	5	(1)
- * Club domestic league appearances and goals as of 00:52, 10 April 2022 (UTC)

James Alexander Poole (born 20 March 1990) is an English footballer. He is primarily a striker but can also play left-wing and as an attacking midfielder. Since 2015 he has worked for City Football Group as a scout, but has combined this role with appearing for a series of non-league sides at the same time.

== Playing career ==
=== Manchester City ===
After joining Manchester City's academy from Macclesfield Town's center of excellence for a small fee, he went on to be part of the Manchester City FA Youth Cup winning side in 2007–08 which beat Chelsea and signed a new one-year contract in March 2010.

Having joined Bury on loan on 25 March 2010 until the end of the 2009–10 season, he made his debut on 27 March in a Football League match against Aldershot, going on to make 9 appearances for the club, before being sent-off in the last league match of the season.

=== Hartlepool United ===
On 13 October Poole joined Hartlepool United on a one-month loan deal, which was later extended by a month. Poole made 6 appearances at Hartlepool, scoring his first goal in senior football in the League 1 game against Brighton & Hove Albion. In December 2010, Poole returned to his parent club, Manchester City.

On 13 May 2011, Poole made a permanent move to Hartlepool for the 2011/12 season, signing a two-year contract. He stated in the Hartlepool Mail newspaper that he wanted to sign even more when he saw experienced midfielder Nolberto Solano was signing on the same day.

He scored a wonder goal on his first permanent game for Hartlepool away to MK Dons in a 2–2 draw. Poole scored two goals in his fifth league game against Rochdale which saw him score a 20-yard volley in a 3–1 win to give Hartlepool their first win of the season after four consecutive draws. After a few appearances on the bench, Poole returned to the Hartlepool United team and scored 2 away to Chesterfield. His first, a spectacular left-footed strike made the scores 2–2 and his second proved to be Hartlepool's winner, a close range header in the second half.

Poole won Hartlepool's Goal of the Season award for 2012–13 for his goal in a 2–1 win against Notts County in February 2013, with Poole saying: "I think I would have to say it's probably the best goal I've ever scored. It might not look the best because it doesn't fly in to the top corner from thirty-five yards or anything, but technically I was really pleased with the goal". This goal also made national headlines after the two Hartlepool goalscorers were named Hartley and Poole. The goal was nominated for the Football League's Goal of the Year at the 2014 Football League Awards but was unsuccessful as Franck Moussa won the award.

Poole signed a new contract with Hartlepool in 2013. He began the 2013–14 season under new boss Colin Cooper playing in a midfield role but lost his place in a CAM position to Luke Williams.

Poole left the club in July 2014 turning down a new contract.

=== Bury ===
Poole went on trial with Melbourne City in pre-season but signed for Bury on non-contract terms in August 2014.

Poole joined Conference side Dover Athletic on loan in November 2014.

=== Semi-professional ===
In September 2015 he joined Salford City.

In May 2017 he joined Altrincham and earned an Evo Stik League winners' medal in his first season. In 2019, he spent a month on loan at Hyde United, making four appearances before returning to Altrincham.

After moving to Australia, Poole signed for Preston Lions in 2019.

== Off-field career ==
After leaving Bury, Poole began working for City Football Group, owners of previous club Manchester City, in a scouting role. While there he combined his duties with playing for several non-league sides.

In June 2019 he moved to Australia to head up the Australian branch of CFG's Scouting and Recruitment department, based at Melbourne City FC.
