= Mick Wadsworth =

English football coach and former player

Personal information
- Full name: Michael Wadsworth
- Date of birth: 3 November 1950 (age 76)
- Place of birth: Barnsley, England
- Position: Striker

Senior career*
| Years | Team | Apps | (Gls) |
| 1976–1977 | Scunthorpe United | 28 | (3) |

Managerial career
- 1985: Matlock Town
- 1993–1996: Carlisle United
- 1996–1999: Scarborough
- 1999: Colchester United
- 2001–2002: Oldham Athletic
- 2002–2003: Huddersfield Town
- 2003–2004: DR Congo
- 2004: Beira-Mar
- 2008: Gretna (caretaker)
- 2009: Chester City
- 2010–2011: Hartlepool United
- 2013: Celtic Nation
- 2014: Sheffield F.C.
- * Club domestic league appearances and goals

Michael Wadsworth (born 3 November 1950) is an English football coach and former player.

Born in Barnsley his playing career spanned only one season in The Football League with Scunthorpe United, along with spells playing for Gainsborough Trinity, Mossley and Frickley Athletic. Following the end of his playing career he took up coaching and has had a number of roles at a range of clubs including spells as manager of Frickley Athletic, Carlisle United, Scarborough, Colchester United, Oldham Athletic, Huddersfield Town, Portuguese side Beira-Mar, Chester City and Celtic Nation. He has also managed the national sides of both St. Kitts & Nevis and Democratic Republic of Congo. Wadsworth has also held a number of coaching roles, including eight years working in a number of roles for The FA.

== Playing career ==
Although Wadsworth played in The Football League for a short period of time, his playing experience was limited to 28 appearances for Scunthorpe United in the 1976–77 season. Thus, he is best known for coaching.

A non-League playing career with clubs including Gainsborough Trinity and Mossley ended at Frickley Athletic, where Wadsworth was player-manager. Wadsworth was then employed by the FA until commencing his club management career in 1993.

== Coaching career ==
=== The FA ===
In 1985, Wadsworth was appointed as an FA regional coach in the north-west region of England, a position he would hold until 1991, when he became a Technical Co-ordinator on the FA's Excellence Programme, working on the futures of promising youngsters. Between 1988 and 1992, he was also an official match observer for the England national team under Bobby Robson and then Graham Taylor.

Wadsworth also coached some of the FA's representative teams during his time in their employ, including a coaching role with the national team at the 1990 FIFA World Cup. He spent two years as manager of the England non-league team, five years as manager of the England youth team and had a coaching role with the England U-21 team.

=== Carlisle United Manager ===
In 1993, Wadsworth was offered a coaching role at PSV Eindhoven, but could not accept due to a lack of Dutch coaching credentials. In August, however he was appointed Carlisle United manager. Carlisle finished 7th in Division Three and made the playoffs, but lost in the semi-final. The following season Carlisle reached the Auto Windscreens Trophy final but lost to Barry Fry's Birmingham City. In the league the club finished 1st in Division Three, winning promotion.

After a poor start to 1995–96 in Division Two, Wadsworth resigned from his post as Director of Coaching.

=== Scarborough ===
In January 1996 Wadsworth became the assistant to the inexperienced Gary Megson at Norwich City. Norwich were to finish the season 16th of 24 in Division One. At the end of the disastrous season he moved to Scarborough as manager and took the club to the play-off semi-finals in his second season.

=== Colchester United Manager and St Kitts & Nevis Coach ===
In January 1999 Wadsworth left Scarborough to manage Colchester United. He brought in a host of new players and the club escaped from relegation by finishing 18th in Division Two that May. In the close-season, he released a number of the fans favourite players including Joe Dunne and Tony Adcock. Wadsworth held a short-term coaching role with St. Kitts & Nevis. Not long afterwards, however, Wadsworth resigned from Colchester on 25 August 1999 citing difficulties with commuting from his home at Pontefract.

=== Newcastle United Assistant Manager ===
It was therefore somewhat ironic that after leaving Colchester, Wadsworth spent two weeks working with Steve Coppell even further south at Crystal Palace before becoming assistant manager to Sir Bobby Robson at Newcastle United.

In May 2000, Newcastle finished 11th in the Premier League, a position they would repeat in 2001.

=== Southampton Assistant Manager, Oldham Athletic Manager ===
Wadsworth was to leave Newcastle in June 2001, without telling Sir Bobby, to become assistant manager to Stuart Gray at Southampton. In November the duo were sacked after a very poor start to the season. The following month he was appointed manager of Oldham Athletic but was fired at the end of the season after finishing ninth in Division Two.

=== Huddersfield Town Manager ===
After Lou Macari and Joe Jordan's dismissal Wadsworth was appointed manager of Huddersfield Town in July 2002, after being recommended to chairman David Taylor for the job. Firstly he brought in Dave Wilkes as his First Team Coach and former Barnsley keeper Dave Watson but by January 2003 he was sacked but as Wadsworth and the club could not agree a severance package, he was reinstated until March.

=== Congo national team ===
In November 2003 he was appointed manager of Democratic Republic of Congo ahead of African Nations Cup, for which they had qualified. He was sacked from "The Simbas" on 2 February 2004, the day after the team had lost their third of three matches in the tournament.

=== Beira-Mar and Shrewsbury Town ===
In June 2004, he was appointed manager of Portuguese club Beira-Mar, but left in September amid claims of boardroom interference. Wadsworth re-surfaced at Shrewsbury Town in January 2005 as assistant manager to Gary Peters and remained with the club until March 2006.

=== Gretna and Chester City ===
Wadsworth was appointed Director of Club Development at Scottish side Gretna in July 2006, and he later took on a dual role as Director of Football and assistant manager when David Irons was appointed as Gretna's new manager in July 2007. On 19 May 2008, forty members of staff at Gretna, including Wadsworth, were laid off due to financial difficulties and after relegation.

Wadsworth was then appointed Chester City manager on 29 June 2009. After just two wins in 13 Football Conference games, Wadsworth was sacked.

=== Hartlepool United ===
Wadsworth was appointed First Team Coach at Football League One club Hartlepool United in June 2010 and Caretaker Manager on 19 August following the resignation of Director of Sport Chris Turner. After a successful season in League One where Pools finished 16th and on 23 June Wadsworth was rewarded with an extension to his contract; becoming the club's first permanent manager in 920 days. On 6 December 2011, following a run of bad home form the club announced he had been relieved of his duties.

=== Sheffield United ===
In October 2013 Wadsworth was appointed as temporary first team coach at Sheffield United to support caretaker manager Chris Morgan.

Mick had a six-month spell as manager of non-league Sheffield F.C., in 2014, and returned to Sheffield United as the club's Senior Youth Development in July 2015. He left the club in August 2019.

== Personal life ==
Wadsworth grew up in the village of Dodworth which is in the metropolitan borough of Barnsley. His father was a collier and Wadsworth himself began his career working down the pit. Prior to working as a football coach, Wadsworth worked as a PE teacher and taught future footballer David Hirst. Wadsworth is a boyhood fan of Sheffield Wednesday. Wadsworth is a keen artist and has auctioned off some of his drawing of football grounds for charity. Wadsworth can also play the piano, guitar and harmonica.

Wadsworth's son, Greg, is a football agent.

== Honours ==
Carlisle United

- Football League Third Division: 1994–95
- Football League Trophy runner-up: 1994–95

Individual

- Football League One Manager of the Month: December 2010
