= 2014–15 Hartlepool United F.C. season =

Hartlepool United
2014–15 season
- Owner: IOR
- Chairman: Ken Hodcroft
- Manager: Colin Cooper (until 4 October); Paul Murray (until 6 December); Ronnie Moore (from 16 December)
- League Two: 22nd
- FA Cup: Second round
- League Cup: First round
- League Trophy: First round
- Top goalscorer: League: Scott Fenwick (6); All: Scott Fenwick (6); Jonathan Franks (6)
- Highest home attendance: 5,393 (vs Southend United)
- Lowest home attendance: 1,856 (vs Sheffield United)
- Average home league attendance: 3,753
- Biggest win: 2–0 (vs. Cheltenham Town, East Thurrock United, Oxford United and Shrewsbury Town)
- Biggest defeat: 5–1 (vs. Northampton Town)
Home colours	Away colours

The 2014–15 season was Hartlepool United's 106th season in existence and the second consecutive season in Football League Two. Along with competing in League Two, the club also participated in the FA Cup, League Cup and League Trophy. The season covers the period from 1 July 2014 to 30 June 2015.

== Players ==
=== First-team squad ===
Note: Flags indicate national team as defined under FIFA eligibility rules; some limited exceptions apply. Players may hold more than one non-FIFA nationality.

No.	Pos.	Nation	Player
1	GK	ENG	Scott Flinders
2	DF	ENG	Neil Austin
3	DF	ENG	Darren Holden
4	DF	ENG	Matthew Bates
5	DF	ENG	Sam Collins
7	MF	ENG	Jonathan Franks
8	MF	ENG	Brad Walker
9	FW	ENG	Marlon Harewood
10	MF	ENG	Tommy Miller
11	MF	WAL	Jack Compton
12	DF	ENG	Stuart Parnaby
14	MF	ENG	Michael Woods
15	MF	ENG	Ebby Nelson-Addy
16	MF	ENG	Nicky Featherstone

No.	Pos.	Nation	Player
17	FW	ENG	Scott Fenwick
18	MF	ENG	Lewis Hawkins
19	MF	ENG	Jordan Richards
20	DF	ENG	Dan Jones
21	DF	ENG	Michael Duckworth
23	MF	ENG	Connor Smith
24	FW	ENG	Jordan Hugill
26	DF	ENG	Scott Harrison
27	MF	NIR	Jordan Jones
28	MF	ENG	Kieran Green
29	DF	ENG	David Mirfin
30	FW	ENG	Marvin Morgan
31	MF	ENG	Aaron Tshibola

== Transfers ==
=== Transfers in ===
Date	Position	Player	From	Fee	Ref
24 June 2014	DF	Matthew Bates	Bradford City	Free	
26 June 2014	DF	Stuart Parnaby	Middlesbrough	Free	
8 August 2014	MF	Tommy Miller	Bury	Free	
8 August 2014	MF	Michael Woods	Harrogate Town	Free	
31 October 2014	MF	Nicky Featherstone	Harrogate Town	Free	
31 October 2014	MF	Sidney Schmeltz	Oldham Athletic	Free	
7 November 2014	FW	Scott Fenwick	Dunston UTS	Free	
21 November 2014	GK	Jon Maxted	Doncaster Rovers	Free	
2 February 2015	DF	Scott Harrison	Sunderland	Undisclosed	
6 March 2015	MF	Ebby Nelson-Addy	Worcester City	Free	

=== Transfers out ===
Date	Position	Player	To	Fee	Ref
6 May 2014	FW	Zak Boagey	Whitby Town	Free	
6 May 2014	MF	Andy Monkhouse	Bristol Rovers	Free	
6 May 2014	MF	Greg Rutherford	Dover Athletic	Free	
6 May 2014	MF	Simon Walton	Stevenage	Free	
20 June 2014	MF	Antony Sweeney	Carlisle United	Free	
8 August 2014	FW	James Poole	Bury	Free	
1 September 2014	FW	Luke James	Peterborough United	Undisclosed	
19 September 2014	GK	Andy Rafferty	Dover Athletic	Free	
20 October 2014	DF	Josh Rowbotham	West Auckland Town	Free	
31 December 2014	MF	Sidney Schmeltz	Petrojet	Free	

=== Loans in ===
Date	Position	Player	From	End date	Ref
8 August 2014	GK	Joel Dixon	Sunderland	8 September 2014	
8 August 2014	MF	Ryan Brobbel	Middlesbrough	2 November 2014	
21 August 2014	FW	Charlie Wyke	Middlesbrough	24 November 2014	
22 August 2014	DF	Scott Harrison	Sunderland	24 November 2014	
16 September 2014	GK	Freddie Woodman	Newcastle United	21 October 2014	
26 September 2014	DF	David Atkinson	Middlesbrough	26 October 2014	
21 October 2014	MF	Matt Crooks	Huddersfield Town	18 November 2014	
21 November 2014	FW	Adam Campbell	Newcastle United	21 December 2014	
21 November 2014	FW	Joe Ironside	Sheffield United	31 December 2014	
25 November 2014	DF	Matteo Lanzoni	Cambridge United	31 December 2014	
27 November 2014	MF	Matthew Dolan	Bradford City	20 December 2014	
2 January 2015	MF	Aaron Tshibola	Reading	1 June 2015	
2 January 2015	FW	Rakish Bingham	Mansfield Town	2 February 2015	
2 January 2015	DF	Scott Harrison	Sunderland	2 February 2015	
2 February 2015	FW	Marvin Morgan	Plymouth Argyle	1 June 2015	
2 February 2015	DF	David Mirfin	Scunthorpe United	1 June 2015	
13 February 2015	MF	Jordan Jones	Middlesbrough	1 June 2015	
25 February 2015	FW	Ryan Bird	Cambridge United	23 March 2015	
26 March 2015	FW	Jordan Hugill	Preston North End	1 June 2015	

=== Loans out ===
Date	Position	Player	To	End date	Ref
21 November 2014	DF	Josh Nearney	Darlington	21 December 2014	
21 November 2014	MF	Kieran Green	Spennymoor Town	21 December 2014	
6 February 2015	MF	Lewis Hawkins	Spennymoor Town	7 March 2015	

== Competitions ==
=== Pre-season matches ===
16 July 2014	Billingham Town	0–9	Hartlepool United	Billingham
19:00		Report	Compton 20'; Harewood 26'; Walker 43'; Green 47'; Franks 52', 60'; Smith 68', 75', 78'	Stadium: Bedford Terrace

19 July 2014	Bradford Park Avenue	0–1	Hartlepool United	Bradford
15:00		Report	Franks 78'	Stadium: Horsfall Stadium

23 July 2014	Hartlepool United	0–3	Sunderland	Hartlepool
19:30		Report	Lawson 70'; Cartwright 72', 78'	Stadium: Victoria Park; Attendance: 5,617; Referee: Nigel Miller

26 July 2014	Whitby Town	2–1	Hartlepool United	Whitby
15:00	Lynch 42', 54'	Report	Smith 39'	Stadium: Turnbull Ground; Attendance: 381

30 July 2014	Hartlepool United	0–2	Middlesbrough	Hartlepool
19:30		Report	Reach 52'; Fewster 71'	Stadium: Victoria Park; Attendance: 4,015

2 August 2014	Bradford City	1–1	Hartlepool United	Bradford
15:00	Clarke 72'	Report	Walker 71'	Stadium: Valley Parade

4 August 2014	Spennymoor Town	1–4	Hartlepool United	Spennymoor
19:30	Taylor	Report	Hawkins; Richards; Franks	Stadium: The Brewery Field

=== League Two ===
==== League table ====
Pos	Team	Pld	W	D	L	GF	GA	GD	Pts	Promotion, qualification or relegation
20	Carlisle United	46	14	8	24	56	74	−18	50	
21	Mansfield Town	46	13	9	24	38	62	−24	48	
22	Hartlepool United	46	12	9	25	39	70	−31	45	
23	Cheltenham Town (R)	46	9	14	23	40	67	−27	41	Relegation to the National League
24	Tranmere Rovers (R)	46	9	12	25	45	67	−22	39	Relegation to the National League

Updated to match(es) played on 23 May 2015. Source: BBC Sport
Rules for classification: 1) Points; 2) Goal difference; 3) Number of goals scored
(R) Relegated

Overall								Home						Away					
Pld	W	D	L	GF	GA	GD	Pts	W	D	L	GF	GA	GD	W	D	L	GF	GA	GD
46	12	9	25	39	70	−31	45	8	5	10	22	30	−8	4	4	15	17	40	−23

Last updated: 3 May 2015.
Source: Football League Official Site

==== Results by matchday ====
Round	1	2	3	4	5	6	7	8	9	10	11	12	13	14	15	16	17	18	19	20	21	22	23	24	25	26	27	28	29	30	31	32	33	34	35	36	37	38	39	40	41	42	43	44	45	46
Ground	A	H	H	A	A	H	H	A	A	H	H	A	H	A	A	H	A	H	H	A	H	A	H	A	H	A	A	H	A	H	H	A	H	A	H	A	A	H	H	A	H	A	H	A	H	A
Result	L	L	L	W	L	W	D	L	L	D	L	W	L	L	L	D	L	L	L	L	D	D	L	L	W	L	D	W	L	W	L	L	W	L	L	W	W	W	W	D	L	L	D	L	W	D
Position	19	23	23	19	20	18	20	21	23	22	24	21	22	23	24	24	24	24	24	24	24	24	24	24	24	24	24	24	24	24	24	24	24	24	24	24	24	24	22	22	22	22	22	22	22	22

Updated to match(es) played on 3 May 2015. Source: Statto.com
A = Away; H = Home; W = Win; D = Draw; L = Loss

==== Matches ====
9 August 2014 1	Stevenage	1–0	Hartlepool United	Stevenage
15:00	Whelpdale 60'	Report		Stadium: Broadhall Way; Attendance: 3,023; Referee: Mark Haywood

16 August 2014 2	Hartlepool United	0–2	Bury	Hartlepool
15:00		Report	Nardiello 18'; Rose 73'	Stadium: Victoria Park; Attendance: 3,246; Referee: Gary Sutton

19 August 2014 3	Hartlepool United	0–2	Dagenham & Redbridge	Hartlepool
19:45		Report	Howell 5'; Ogogo 64'	Stadium: Victoria Park; Attendance: 2,792; Referee: Peter Bankes

23 August 2014 4	A.F.C. Wimbledon	1–2	Hartlepool United	Kingston upon Thames
15:00	Tubbs 11'	Report	Wyke 46'; Harewood 68'	Stadium: Kingsmeadow; Attendance: 3,576; Referee: Brendan Malone

30 August 2014 5	Cheltenham Town	1–0	Hartlepool United	Cheltenham
15:00	Arthur 90'	Report		Stadium: Whaddon Road; Attendance: 2,735; Referee: Christopher Sarginson

6 September 2014 6	Hartlepool United	2–0	Shrewsbury Town	Hartlepool
15:00	Wyke 5'; Walker (yellow card) 78' (goal) 79'	Report		Stadium: Victoria Park; Attendance: 3,368; Referee: Jeremy Simpson

13 September 2014 7	Hartlepool United	0–0	Tranmere Rovers	Hartlepool
15:00		Report		Stadium: Victoria Park; Attendance: 3,245; Referee: Darren Handley

16 September 2014 8	Northampton Town	5–1	Hartlepool United	Northampton
19:45	Richards 12' (pen.), 76'; Mohamed 20', 35'; D'Ath 67'	Report	Wyke 1'	Stadium: Sixfields Stadium; Attendance: 3,652; Referee: Simon Hooper

20 September 2014 9	Plymouth Argyle	2–0	Hartlepool United	Plymouth
15:00	Morgan 14'; Thomas 77'	Report		Stadium: Home Park; Attendance: 6,146; Referee: James Linington

27 September 2014 10	Hartlepool United	0–0	Portsmouth	Hartlepool
15:00		Report		Stadium: Victoria Park; Attendance: 3,439; Referee: Mark Heywood

4 October 2014 11	Hartlepool United	0–3	Carlisle United	Hartlepool
15:00		Report	Rigg 54'; Elliott 82'; Beck 89'	Stadium: Victoria Park; Attendance: 3,927; Referee: Darren Bond

11 October 2014 12	Exeter City	1–2	Hartlepool United	Exeter
15:00	Ribeiro 81'	Report	Woods 49'; Wyke 66'	Stadium: St James Park; Attendance: 3,547; Referee: Darren Sheldrake

18 October 2014 13	Hartlepool United	1–2	Luton Town	Hartlepool
15:00	Austin 90' (pen.)	Report	Cullen 39'; Stevenson 81'	Stadium: Victoria Park; Attendance: 4,225; Referee: Paul Tierney

21 October 2014 14	Accrington Stanley	3–1	Hartlepool United	Accrington
19:45	McCartan 19', 78'; Atkinson 45'	Report	Bates 42'	Stadium: Crown Ground; Attendance: 947; Referee: Andy Madley

25 October 2014 15	Cambridge United	2–1	Hartlepool United	Cambridge
15:00	Donaldson 27'; Dunk 87'	Report	Walker 59'; Crooks (yellow card) 71'	Stadium: Abbey Stadium; Attendance: 4,933; Referee: Kevin Johnson

1 November 2014 16	Hartlepool United	2–2	Newport County	Hartlepool
15:00	Walker 80'; Duckworth 87'	Report	Zebroski 38'; O'Connor 57'	Stadium: Victoria Park; Attendance: 3,172; Referee: Mark Brown

15 November 2014 17	Southend United	1–0	Hartlepool United	Southend-on-Sea
15:00	Worrall 65'	Report		Stadium: Roots Hall; Attendance: 5,436; Referee: Pat Miller

22 November 2014 18	Hartlepool United	1–3	York City	Hartlepool
15:00	Fenwick 27'	Report	Lowe 53', 55'; Hyde 63'	Stadium: Victoria Park; Attendance: 4,234; Referee: Eddie Ilderton

29 November 2014 19	Hartlepool United	1–3	Wycombe Wanderers	Hartlepool
15:00	Harewood 84'	Report	Cowan-Hall 33'; Bloomfield 76'; Mawson 79'	Stadium: Victoria Park; Attendance: 3,053; Referee: Jeremy Simpson

13 December 2014 20	Burton Albion	4–0	Hartlepool United	Burton upon Trent
15:00	MacDonald 45', 46'; Cansdell-Sherriff 65'; Beavon 69'	Report		Stadium: Pirelli Stadium; Attendance: 2,474; Referee: Gavin Ward

20 December 2014 21	Hartlepool United	1–1	Oxford United	Hartlepool
15:00	Ironside 53'	Report	Hylton 65'	Stadium: Victoria Park; Attendance: 4,070; Referee: Geoff Eltringham

26 December 2014 22	Mansfield Town	1–1	Hartlepool United	Mansfield
15:00	Brown 10'	Report	Duckworth 51'	Stadium: Field Mill; Attendance: 3,357; Referee: Scott Mathieson

28 December 2014 23	Hartlepool United	0–2	Morecambe	Hartlepool
15:00		Report	Redshaw 22', 81'	Stadium: Victoria Park; Attendance: 4,108; Referee: Darren Drysdale

3 January 2015 24	Wycombe Wanderers	1–0	Hartlepool United	High Wycombe
15:00	Onyedinma 37'	Report		Stadium: Adams Park; Attendance: 3,607; Referee: Darren Deadman

10 January 2015 25	Hartlepool United	2–0	Cheltenham Town	Hartlepool
15:00	Fenwick 38'; Bingham 68'	Report		Stadium: Victoria Park; Attendance: 3,155; Referee: Richard Clark

17 January 2015 26	Shrewsbury Town	3–0	Hartlepool United	Shrewsbury
15:00	Mangan 50', 68'; Collins 59'	BBC Report		Stadium: New Meadow; Attendance: 4,601; Referee: Seb Stockbridge

24 January 2015 27	Tranmere Rovers	1–1	Hartlepool United	Birkenhead
15:00	Odejayi 12'	Report	Fenwick 14'	Stadium: Prenton Park; Attendance: 5,488; Referee: Geoff Eltringham

31 January 2015 28	Hartlepool United	3–2	Plymouth Argyle	Hartlepool
15:00	Franks 8', 54' Fenwick 76'	Report	Brunt 30'; Lee 90+4'	Stadium: Victoria Park; Attendance: 3,291; Referee: Chris Kavanagh

7 February 2015 29	Portsmouth	1–0	Hartlepool United	Portsmouth
15:00	Tubbs 60'	Report		Stadium: Fratton Park; Attendance: 14,397; Referee: Graham Horwood

10 February 2015 30	Hartlepool United	1–0	Northampton Town	Hartlepool
19:45	Morgan 51'	Report		Stadium: Victoria Park; Attendance: 2,856; Referee: Nigel Miller

14 February 2015 31	Hartlepool United	1–3	Stevenage	Hartlepool
15:00	Fenwick 49'	Report	Martin 38'; Kennedy 52', 65'	Stadium: Victoria Park; Attendance: 3,388; Referee: Steve Martin

21 February 2015 32	Bury	1–0	Hartlepool United	Bury
15:00	Tutte 75'	Report		Stadium: Gigg Lane; Attendance: 3,172; Referee: Chris Sarginson

28 February 2015 33	Hartlepool United	1–0	A.F.C. Wimbledon	Hartlepool
15:00	Bird 73'	Report		Stadium: Victoria Park; Attendance: 3,345; Referee: Carl Boyeson

3 March 2015 34	Dagenham & Redbridge	2–0	Hartlepool United	Dagenham
19:45	Harrison 22' (o.g.); Bingham 66'	Report		Stadium: Victoria Road; Attendance: 1,799; Referee: Darren Deadman

7 March 2015 35	Hartlepool United	0–1	Burton Albion	Hartlepool
15:00		Report	Cuvelier 90'	Stadium: Victoria Park; Attendance: 3,289; Referee: Darren Bond

14 March 2015 36	Morecambe	0–1	Hartlepool United	Morecambe
15:00		Report	Parrish 35' (o.g.)	Stadium: Globe Arena; Attendance: 1,673; Referee: Mark Haywood

17 March 2015 37	Oxford United	0–2	Hartlepool United	Oxford
19:45		Report	Bird 33'; Austin 51'	Stadium: Kassam Stadium; Attendance: 4,375; Referee: Pat Miller & Brian Durie

21 March 2015 38	Hartlepool United	1–0	Mansfield Town	Hartlepool
15:00	Walker 47' (pen.)	BBC Report		Stadium: Victoria Park; Attendance: 4,166; Referee: Darren Handley

28 March 2015 39	Hartlepool United	2–1	Cambridge United	Hartlepool
15:00	Walker 20'; Harrison 67'	BBC Report	Harrold 32'	Stadium: Victoria Park; Attendance: 5,009; Referee: Andy Haines

3 April 2015 40	Newport County	2–2	Hartlepool United	Newport
15:00	Jones 44'; O'Connor 48'	Report	Minshull 15' (o.g.); Hugill 37'	Stadium: Rodney Parade; Attendance: 3,531; Referee: Lee Collins

6 April 2015 41	Hartlepool United	0–1	Southend United	Hartlepool
15:00		Report	Atkinson 53'	Stadium: Victoria Park; Attendance: 5,393; Referee: Graham Salisbury

11 April 2015 42	York City	1–0	Hartlepool United	York
15:00	Summerfield 67'	Report		Stadium: Bootham Crescent; Attendance: 5,424; Referee: Keith Stroud

14 April 2015 43	Hartlepool United	1–1	Accrington Stanley	Hartlepool
19:45	Harewood 80'	Report	Windass 38'	Stadium: Victoria Park; Attendance: 4,159; Referee: Jeremy Simpson

18 April 2015 44	Luton Town	3–0	Hartlepool United	Luton
15:00	McGeehan 5'; Howells 15' (pen.); Griffiths 71'	Report		Stadium: Kenilworth Road; Attendance: 8,231; Referee: Gary Sutton

25 April 2015 45	Hartlepool United	2–1	Exeter City	Hartlepool
15:00	Fenwick 15'; Hugill 44'	Report	Cummins 17'	Stadium: Victoria Park; Attendance: 4,994; Referee: Carl Boyeson

2 May 2015 46	Carlisle United	3–3	Hartlepool United	Carlisle
15:00	Dempsey 25'; Rigg 31'; Kennedy 33'	Report	Hugill 63', 86'; Duckworth 64'	Stadium: Brunton Park; Attendance: 8,105; Referee: Scott Mathieson

=== FA Cup ===
8 November 2014 First round	Hartlepool United	2–0	East Thurrock United	Hartlepool
15:00	Franks 32', 86'	Report		Stadium: Victoria Park; Attendance: 2,800; Referee: Ben Toner

5 December 2014 Second round	Hartlepool United	1–2	Blyth Spartans	Hartlepool
19:55	Franks 31'	Report	Turnbull 56'; Rivers 90'	Stadium: Victoria Park; Attendance: 3,735; Referee: Andy Madley

=== League Cup ===
12 August 2014 First round	Port Vale	6–2	Hartlepool United	Burslem
19:45	Williamson 8', 14', 18'; Brown 62'; Pope 74', 84'	Report	Franks 10'; Austin 59' (pen.)	Stadium: Vale Park; Attendance: 2,824; Referee: Graham Scott

=== Football League Trophy ===
7 October 2014 Second round	Hartlepool United	1–2	Sheffield United	Hartlepool
19:45	Duckworth 50'	Report	Baxter 30'; Campbell-Ryce 82'	Stadium: Victoria Park; Attendance: 1,856; Referee: Carl Boyeson

== Squad statistics ==
=== Appearances and goals ===
No.	Pos	Nat	Player	Total		League Two		FA Cup		League Cup		Other	
No.	Pos	Nat	Player	Apps	Goals	Apps	Goals	Apps	Goals	Apps	Goals	Apps	Goals
1	GK	(England) ENG	Scott Flinders	50	0	46	0	2	0	1	0	1	0
2	DF	(England) ENG	Neil Austin	50	3	46	2	2	0	1	1	1	0
3	DF	(England) ENG	Darren Holden	11	0	11	0	0	0	0	0	0	0
4	DF	(England) ENG	Matthew Bates	27	1	25	1	1	0	1	0	0	0
5	DF	(England) ENG	Sam Collins	9	0	7	0	1	0	1	0	0	0
7	MF	(England) ENG	Jonathan Franks	49	6	46	2	2	3	1	1	0	0
8	MF	(England) ENG	Brad Walker	32	5	28	5	2	0	1	0	1	0
9	FW	(England) ENG	Marlon Harewood	37	3	34	3	2	0	1	0	0	0
10	MF	(England) ENG	Tommy Miller	17	1	15	1	0	0	1	0	1	0
11	MF	(Wales) WAL	Jack Compton	22	0	21	0	1	0	0	0	0	0
12	DF	(England) ENG	Stuart Parnaby	5	0	5	0	0	0	0	0	0	0
14	MF	(England) ENG	Michael Woods	27	1	23	1	2	0	1	0	1	0
15	MF	(England) ENG	Matty Dolan	2	0	2	0	0	0	0	0	0	0
15	MF	(England) ENG	Ebby Nelson-Addy	2	0	2	0	0	0	0	0	0	0
16	MF	(England) ENG	Nicky Featherstone	27	0	25	0	2	0	0	0	0	0
17	MF	(Northern Ireland) NIR	Ryan Brobbel	17	0	15	0	0	0	1	0	1	0
17	FW	(England) ENG	Scott Fenwick	19	6	19	6	0	0	0	0	0	0
18	MF	(England) ENG	Lewis Hawkins	13	0	12	0	0	0	0	0	1	0
19	DF	(England) ENG	Jordan Richards	10	0	9	0	1	0	0	0	0	0
20	DF	(England) ENG	Dan Jones	26	2	23	2	2	0	0	0	1	0
21	DF	(England) ENG	Michael Duckworth	40	4	37	3	1	0	1	0	1	1
23	FW	(England) ENG	Connor Smith	9	0	8	0	0	0	0	0	1	0
24	FW	(England) ENG	Charlie Wyke	14	4	13	4	0	0	0	0	1	0
24	DF	(Italy) ITA	Matteo Lanzoni	2	0	1	0	1	0	0	0	0	0
24	FW	(England) ENG	Jordan Hugill	8	4	8	4	0	0	0	0	0	0
26	DF	(England) ENG	Scott Harrison	37	1	36	1	0	0	0	0	1	0
27	MF	(Netherlands) NED	Sidney Schmeltz	7	0	5	0	2	0	0	0	0	0
27	MF	(Northern Ireland) NIR	Jordan Jones	11	0	11	0	0	0	0	0	0	0
28	MF	(England) ENG	Kieran Green	2	0	1	0	0	0	0	0	1	0
29	MF	(England) ENG	Matt Crooks	3	0	3	0	0	0	0	0	0	0
29	FW	(England) ENG	Adam Campbell	2	0	2	0	0	0	0	0	0	0
29	FW	(England) ENG	Rakish Bingham	5	1	5	1	0	0	0	0	0	0
29	DF	(England) ENG	David Mirfin	15	0	15	0	0	0	0	0	0	0
30	FW	(England) ENG	Marvin Morgan	5	1	5	1	0	0	0	0	0	0
31	FW	(England) ENG	Joe Ironside	4	1	4	1	0	0	0	0	0	0
31	MF	(England) ENG	Aaron Tshibola	23	0	23	0	0	0	0	0	0	0
33	MF	(England) ENG	Luke James	5	0	4	0	0	0	1	0	0	0
35	FW	(England) ENG	Ryan Bird	6	2	6	2	0	0	0	0	0	0
