= 2015–16 Hartlepool United F.C. season =

Hartlepool United F.C.
2015–16 season
- Owner: JPNG
- Chairman: Gary Coxall
- Manager: Ronnie Moore (until 10 February); Craig Hignett (from 10 February)
- Stadium: Victoria Park
- League Two: 16th
- FA Cup: Third round (eliminated by Derby County)
- League Cup: Second round (eliminated by Bournemouth)
- League Trophy: First round (eliminated by Sheffield United)
- Top goalscorer: League: Billy Paynter (14); All: Billy Paynter (15)
- Highest home attendance: 5,046 (vs Portsmouth)
- Lowest home attendance: 2,221 (vs Sheffield United)
- Average home league attendance: 3,889
- Biggest win: 5–2 (vs. Morecambe)
- Biggest defeat: 5–0 (vs. Plymouth Argyle)
| Home colours | Away colours |

The 2015–16 season is Hartlepool United's 107th year in existence and their third consecutive season in League Two. Along with competing in League Two, the club will also participate in the FA Cup, League Cup and League Trophy. The season covers the period from 1 July 2015 to 30 June 2016.

== Players ==
As of the end of the season.

=== First-team squad ===
Note: Flags indicate national team as defined under FIFA eligibility rules; some limited exceptions apply. Players may hold more than one non-FIFA nationality.

| No. | Pos. | Nation | Player |
|---|---|---|---|
| 1 | GK | NIR | Trevor Carson |
| 2 | DF | ENG | Carl Magnay |
| 3 | DF | IRL | Jake Carroll |
| 4 | DF | ENG | Harry Worley |
| 5 | DF | ENG | Scott Harrison |
| 6 | DF | ENG | Matthew Bates |
| 7 | MF | ENG | Nathan Thomas |
| 8 | MF | ENG | Brad Walker |
| 9 | FW | ENG | Rakish Bingham |
| 10 | FW | ENG | Billy Paynter |
| 11 | MF | ENG | Kudus Oyenuga |
| 12 | MF | ENG | Ebby Nelson-Addy |
| 13 | GK | ENG | Adam Bartlett |
| 14 | MF | ENG | Michael Woods |
| 15 | FW | ENG | Rhys Oates |
| 16 | MF | ENG | Nicky Featherstone |

| No. | Pos. | Nation | Player |
|---|---|---|---|
| 17 | FW | ENG | Scott Fenwick |
| 18 | MF | ENG | Lewis Hawkins |
| 19 | MF | ENG | Jordan Richards |
| 20 | DF | ENG | Dan Jones |
| 21 | DF | ENG | Michael Duckworth |
| 22 | DF | ENG | Josh Nearney |
| 23 | MF | ENG | Connor Smith |
| 24 | MF | ENG | Kieran Green |
| 26 | DF | ENG | Adam Jackson |
| 27 | MF | ENG | Jack Blackford |
| 28 | MF | ENG | Josh Laurent |
| 29 | DF | ENG | Rob Jones |
| 30 | MF | ENG | Jake Gray |
| 31 | GK | ENG | Peter Denton |
| 33 | FW | ENG | Luke James |

== Transfers ==
=== Transfers in ===
| Date | Position | Player | From | Fee | Ref |
|---|---|---|---|---|---|
| 20 May 2015 | FW | Rakish Bingham | Mansfield Town | Free | |
| 28 May 2015 | FW | Rhys Oates | Barnsley | Free | |
| 1 June 2015 | DF | Carl Magnay | Grimsby Town | Free | |
| 8 June 2015 | DF | Harry Worley | Stevenage | Free | |
| 12 June 2015 | DF | Jake Carroll | Huddersfield Town | Free | |
| 15 June 2015 | GK | Trevor Carson | Cheltenham Town | Undisclosed | |
| 27 June 2015 | FW | Billy Paynter | Carlisle United | Free | |
| 6 July 2015 | MF | Kudus Oyenuga | Dundee United | Free | |
| 10 July 2015 | GK | Adam Bartlett | Gateshead | Free | |
| 13 July 2015 | GK | Peter Denton | Rotherham United | Free | |
| 12 January 2016 | MF | Nathan Thomas | Mansfield Town | Undisclosed | |
| 1 February 2016 | MF | Josh Laurent | Brentford | Free | |
| 3 March 2016 | DF | Rob Jones | Doncaster Rovers | Free | |

=== Loans in ===
| Date | Position | Player | From | End date | Ref |
|---|---|---|---|---|---|
| 20 August 2015 | DF | Andrew Boyce | Scunthorpe United | 22 October 2015 | |
| 10 September 2015 | DF | Brad Halliday | Middlesbrough | 10 October 2015 | |
| 14 October 2015 | DF | Luke Hendrie | Burnley | 31 October 2015 | |
| 16 October 2015 | MF | Jason Banton | Wycombe Wanderers | 16 November 2015 | |
| 17 October 2015 | DF | Magnus Okuonghae | Luton Town | 17 November 2015 | |
| 4 November 2015 | DF | Adam Jackson | Middlesbrough | 1 June 2016 | |
| 6 November 2015 | MF | Jake Gray | Crystal Palace | 1 June 2016 | |
| 13 November 2015 | FW | Mikael Mandron | Sunderland | 31 December 2015 | |
| 13 November 2015 | MF | Kal Naismith | Portsmouth | 3 January 2016 | |
| 17 January 2016 | FW | Ellis Harrison | Bristol Rovers | 20 February 2016 | |
| 1 February 2016 | FW | Luke James | Peterborough United | 1 June 2016 | |

=== Transfers out ===
| Date | Position | Name | To | Fee | Ref |
|---|---|---|---|---|---|
| 16 June 2015 | DF | Darren Holden | Ross County | Free | |
| 17 June 2015 | MF | Jack Compton | Yeovil Town | Free | |
| 18 June 2015 | MF | Jonathan Franks | Ross County | Free | |
| 23 June 2015 | GK | Scott Flinders | York City | Free | |
| 10 July 2015 | FW | Marlon Harewood | Nuneaton Town | Free | |
| 24 July 2015 | GK | Jon Maxted | Forest Green Rovers | Free | |
| 7 August 2015 | DF | Neil Austin | Shaw Lane Aquaforce | Free | |
| 10 September 2015 | DF | Stuart Parnaby | Retired | —N/a | |
| 17 October 2015 | MF | Tommy Miller | FC Halifax Town | Free | |

=== Loans out ===
| Date | Position | Player | To | End date | Ref |
|---|---|---|---|---|---|
| 9 October 2015 | GK | Peter Denton | Bedlington Terriers | 19 February 2016 | |
| 15 October 2015 | MF | Kieran Green | Frickley Athletic | 15 November 2015 | |
| 20 October 2015 | MF | Lewis Hawkins | Spennymoor Town | 7 January 2016 | |
| 23 October 2015 | DF | Josh Nearney | Whitby Town | 23 November 2015 | |
| 26 November 2015 | MF | Ebby Nelson-Addy | Worcester City | 7 January 2016 | |
| 23 March 2016 | FW | Scott Fenwick | Tranmere Rovers | 19 April 2016 | |

== Competitions ==
=== Pre-season friendlies ===
On 27 May 2015, Hartlepool United announced their first pre-season friendly against Chesterfield. On 11 June 2015, Hartlepool United announced another three pre-season matches. A day later, Hartlepool United confirmed a further four friendlies.

| 13 July 2015 Friendly | Billingham Town | 0–7 | Hartlepool United | Billingham |
| 19:00 | | Report | Worley 19'; Paynter 34' (pen.); Bingham 64', 86'; Carroll 69'; Walker 81', 85' | Stadium: Bedford Terrace |

| 14 July 2015 Friendly | Harrogate Railway Athletic | 0–2 | Hartlepool United | Harrogate |
| 19:00 | | Report | Hawkins 7'; Fenwick 73' | Stadium: Station View |

| 17 July 2015 Friendly | Whitby Town | 1–1 | Hartlepool United | Whitby |
| 19:00 | Roberts 10' | Report | Oates 70' | Stadium: Turnbull Ground |

| 18 July 2015 Friendly | Spennymoor Town | 0–4 | Hartlepool United | Spennymoor |
| 15:00 | | Report | Fenwick 10'; Bell 65'; Smith 75'; Carroll 88' | Stadium: The Brewery Field; Attendance: 665 |

| 21 July 2015 Friendly | Hartlepool United | 0–4 | Scunthorpe United | Hartlepool |
| 19:00 | | Report | Madden 10', 16', 55'; Williams 53' | Stadium: Victoria Park; Attendance: 1,548 (43 Scunthorpe United) |

| 25 July 2015 Friendly | Gateshead | 5–3 | Hartlepool United | Gateshead |
| 15:00 | Shaw 9'; Phillips 41'; Johnson 65'; Kneeshaw 75'; Gillies 87' | Report | Bingham 20', 27', 55' | Stadium: Gateshead International Stadium |

| 29 July 2015 Friendly | Dunston UTS | 0–3 | Hartlepool United | Dunston |
| 19:45 | | Report | Bingham 31'; Featherstone 38'; Carroll 54' | Stadium: UTS Stadium |

| 1 August 2015 Friendly | Hartlepool United | 0–1 | Chesterfield | Hartlepool |
| 15:00 | | Report | Morsy 74' | Stadium: Victoria Park; Attendance: 1,269 (54 Chesterfield) |

=== League Two ===
==== League table ====
| Pos | Team | Pld | W | D | L | GF | GA | GD | Pts |
|---|---|---|---|---|---|---|---|---|---|
| 14 | Exeter City | 46 | 17 | 13 | 16 | 63 | 65 | −2 | 64 |
| 15 | Barnet | 46 | 17 | 11 | 18 | 67 | 68 | −1 | 62 |
| 16 | Hartlepool United | 46 | 15 | 6 | 25 | 49 | 72 | −23 | 51 |
| 17 | Notts County | 46 | 14 | 9 | 23 | 54 | 83 | −29 | 51 |
| 18 | Stevenage | 46 | 11 | 15 | 20 | 52 | 67 | −15 | 48 |

Updated to match(es) played on 7 May 2016. Source: BBC Sport
Rules for classification: 1) Points; 2) Goal difference; 3) Number of goals scored

==== Results summary ====
| Overall | | | | | | | | Home | | | | | | Away | | | | | |
| Pld | W | D | L | GF | GA | GD | Pts | W | D | L | GF | GA | GD | W | D | L | GF | GA | GD |
|---|---|---|---|---|---|---|---|---|---|---|---|---|---|---|---|---|---|---|---|
| 46 | 15 | 6 | 25 | 49 | 72 | −23 | 51 | 9 | 3 | 11 | 27 | 32 | −5 | 6 | 3 | 14 | 22 | 40 | −18 |

==== Results by matchday ====
| Round | 1 | 2 | 3 | 4 | 5 | 6 | 7 | 8 | 9 | 10 | 11 | 12 | 13 | 14 | 15 | 16 | 17 | 18 | 19 | 20 | 21 | 22 | 23 | 24 | 25 | 26 | 27 | 28 | 29 | 30 | 31 | 32 | 33 | 34 | 35 | 36 | 37 | 38 | 39 | 40 | 41 | 42 | 43 | 44 | 45 | 46 |
|---|---|---|---|---|---|---|---|---|---|---|---|---|---|---|---|---|---|---|---|---|---|---|---|---|---|---|---|---|---|---|---|---|---|---|---|---|---|---|---|---|---|---|---|---|---|---|
| Ground | H | A | H | A | H | A | A | H | A | H | H | A | A | H | H | A | H | A | H | A | H | H | A | A | H | H | H | H | A | H | A | A | H | A | A | H | A | H | A | A | A | H | H | A | H | A |
| Result | W | W | W | L | L | L | L | D | W | L | L | L | W | D | L | L | W | L | L | L | L | W | L | D | L | L | W | L | L | D | L | W | W | D | D | W | W | W | L | W | L | W | L | L | L | L |
| Position | 4 | 5 | 3 | 5 | 6 | 10 | 14 | 14 | 11 | 17 | 17 | 17 | 17 | 17 | 19 | 19 | 19 | 19 | 20 | 20 | 21 | 21 | 21 | 21 | 21 | 22 | 21 | 21 | 21 | 22 | 22 | 22 | 22 | 21 | 21 | 21 | 17 | 17 | 17 | 16 | 16 | 16 | 16 | 16 | 16 | 16 |

Source: Statto.com
A = Away; H = Home; W = Win; D = Draw; L = Loss

==== Matches ====
On 17 June 2015, the fixtures for the forthcoming season were announced.

| 8 August 2015 1 | Hartlepool United | 2–0 | Morecambe | Hartlepool |
| 15:00 | Paynter 25'; Bingham 65' | Report | | Stadium: Victoria Park; Attendance: 4,289; Referee: Darren England |

| 15 August 2015 2 | York City | 1–2 | Hartlepool United | York |
| 15:00 | Thompson 57' | Report | Paynter 71'; Woods 81' | Stadium: Bootham Crescent; Attendance: 4,890; Referee: Sebastian Stockbridge |

| 18 August 2015 3 | Hartlepool United | 1–0 | Newport County | Hartlepool |
| 19:45 | Fenwick 51' | Report | | Stadium: Victoria Park; Attendance: 3,739; Referee: Ben Toner |

| 22 August 2015 4 | Stevenage | 2–0 | Hartlepool United | Stevenage |
| 15:00 | Franks 45'; Williams 88' | Report | | Stadium: Broadhall Way; Attendance: 2,639; Referee: Charles Breakspear |

| 29 August 2015 5 | Hartlepool United | 2–3 | Carlisle United | Hartlepool |
| 15:00 | Harrison 6'; Paynter 70' (pen.) | Report | Ibehre 57', 84'; Miller 76' | Stadium: Victoria Park; Attendance: 4,935; Referee: Andy Haines |

| 5 September 2015 6 | Wycombe Wanderers | 2–1 | Hartlepool United | High Wycombe |
| 15:00 | Harriman 26', 56' | Report | Magnay 43', (red card) 86' | Stadium: Adams Park; Attendance: 3,468; Referee: Darren Deadman |

| 12 September 2015 7 | Exeter City | 1–0 | Hartlepool United | Exeter |
| 15:00 | Ribeiro 90' | Report | | Stadium: St James Park; Attendance: 3,135; Referee: Andy Woolmer |

| 19 September 2015 8 | Hartlepool United | 0–0 | Cambridge United | Hartlepool |
| 15:00 | | Report | | Stadium: Victoria Park; Attendance: 3,665; Referee: Geoff Eltringham |

| 26 September 2015 9 | Yeovil Town | 1–2 | Hartlepool United | Yeovil |
| 15:00 | Bird 37' | Report | Fenwick 32'; Walker 83' | Stadium: Huish Park; Attendance: 3,078; Referee: Fred Graham |

| 29 September 2015 10 | Hartlepool United | 0–3 | Bristol Rovers | Hartlepool |
| 19:45 | | Report | Taylor 32'; Bodin 64'; Easter 78' | Stadium: Victoria Park; Attendance: 3,788; Referee: Darren Handley |

| 3 October 2015 11 | Hartlepool United | 1–4 | Luton Town | Hartlepool |
| 15:00 | Paynter 44' | Report | Smith 17'; Marriott 53', 57'; Lee 90' | Stadium: Victoria Park; Attendance: 3,876; Referee: Richard Clark |

| 10 October 2015 12 | Northampton Town | 2–1 | Hartlepool United | Northampton |
| 15:00 | Richards 4'; Adams 21' | Report | Bingham 31' | Stadium: Sixfields; Attendance: 4,477; Referee: Kevin Johnson |

| 17 October 2015 13 | Dagenham and Redbridge | 0–1 | Hartlepool United | Dagenham |
| 15:00 | | Report | Paynter 34' | Stadium: Victoria Road; Attendance: 1,771; Referee: Lee Swabey |

| 20 October 2015 14 | Hartlepool United | 1–1 | Barnet | Hartlepool |
| 19:45 | Oates 7' | Report | Akinde 64' | Stadium: Victoria Park; Attendance: 3,124; Referee: Kevin Wright |

| 24 October 2015 15 | Hartlepool United | 1–2 | Crawley Town | Hartlepool |
| 15:00 | Paynter 80' | Report | Walton 66' (pen.); Murphy 76' | Stadium: Victoria Park; Attendance: 3,262; Referee: Mark Heywood |

| 31 October 2015 16 | Wimbledon | 2–0 | Hartlepool United | Norbiton |
| 14:00 | Kennedy 18'; Taylor 28' | Report | | Stadium: Kingsmeadow; Attendance: 3,638; Referee: Lee Collins |

| 15 November 2015 17 | Hartlepool United | 3–1 | Leyton Orient | Hartlepool |
| 12:15 | Oyenuga 20' (pen.); Gray 70', 85' | Report | Pritchard 13' | Stadium: Victoria Park; Attendance: 4,081; Referee: Paul Tierney |

| 21 November 2015 18 | Mansfield Town | 3–1 | Hartlepool United | Mansfield |
| 15:00 GMT | Green 24', 81'; Yussuf 57' | Report | Pearce 37' (o.g.) | Stadium: Field Mill; Attendance: 3,031; Referee: David Coote |

| 28 November 2015 19 | Hartlepool United | 0–1 | Oxford United | Hartlepool |
| 15:00 GMT | | Report | Hylton 70' | Stadium: Victoria Park; Attendance: 3,662; Referee: Sebastian Stockbridge |

| 12 December 2015 20 | Portsmouth | 4–0 | Hartlepool United | Portsmouth |
| 15:00 GMT | Lavery 32'; Jackson 37' (o.g.); Evans 61'; McNulty 90' | Report | | Stadium: Fratton Park; Attendance: 15,610; Referee: Chris Sarginson |

| 19 December 2015 21 | Hartlepool United | 1–2 | Plymouth Argyle | Hartlepool |
| 15:00 GMT | Fenwick 84' (pen.) | Report | McHugh 76'; Mellor 90' | Stadium: Victoria Park; Attendance: 3,534; Referee: Graham Salisbury |

| 16 January 2016 22 | Hartlepool United | 1–0 | Wycombe Wanderers | Hartlepool |
| 15:00 GMT | Fenwick 33' | Report | | Stadium: Victoria Park; Attendance: 3,721; Referee: Mark Brown |

| 19 January 2016 23 | Accrington Stanley | 3–1 | Hartlepool United | Accrington |
| 19:45 GMT | Buxton 23'; McCartan 45', 58' | Report | Bingham 77' | Stadium: Crown Ground; Attendance: 1,211; Referee: Darren Drysdale |

| 23 January 2016 24 | Cambridge United | 1–1 | Hartlepool United | Cambridge |
| 15:00 GMT | Williamson 90' | Report | Gray 71' | Stadium: Abbey Stadium; Attendance: 5,054; Referee: Keith Hill |

| 30 January 2016 25 | Hartlepool United | 0–2 | Exeter City | Hartlepool |
| 15:00 GMT | | Report | Nichols 36'; Grant 85' | Stadium: Victoria Park; Attendance: 3,678; Referee: Darren Handley |

| 9 February 2016 26 | Hartlepool United | 1–2 | Stevenage | Hartlepool |
| 19:45 GMT | Paynter 68' | Report | Conlon 45', 52' | Stadium: Victoria Park; Attendance: 3,308; Referee: Ben Toner |

| 13 February 2016 27 | Hartlepool United | 2–1 | Yeovil Town | Hartlepool |
| 15:00 GMT | Paynter 58' (pen.); Jackson 71' | Report | Zoko 93' | Stadium: Victoria Park; Attendance: 3,923; Referee: Kevin Wright |

| 16 February 2016 28 | Hartlepool United | 2–3 | Notts County | Hartlepool |
| 19:45 GMT | Gray 62'; Paynter 66' | Report | Stead 4', 80'; Noble 14' | Stadium: Victoria Park; Attendance: 3,433; Referee: David Webb |

| 20 February 2016 29 | Luton Town | 2–1 | Hartlepool United | Luton |
| 15:00 GMT | McGeehan 60' (pen.); Mackail-Smith 86' | Report | Jackson 65' | Stadium: Kenilworth Road; Attendance: 7,880; Referee: Andy Davies |

| 27 February 2016 30 | Hartlepool United | 0–0 | Northampton Town | Hartlepool |
| 15:00 GMT | | Report | | Stadium: Victoria Park; Attendance: 4,012; Referee: Mark Haywood |

| 1 March 2016 31 | Bristol Rovers | 4–1 | Hartlepool United | Bristol |
| 19:45 GMT | Taylor 10', 38', 56'; Gaffney 31' | Report | Paynter 52' | Stadium: Memorial Stadium; Attendance: 6,634; Referee: Lee Swabey |

| 5 March 2016 32 | Barnet | 1–3 | Hartlepool United | Barnet |
| 15:00 GMT | Shomotun 11' | Report | Hawkins 34', 40'; Thomas 62' | Stadium: The Hive Stadium; Attendance: 1,734; Referee: Darren Handley |

| 12 March 2016 33 | Hartlepool United | 3–1 | Dagenham & Redbridge | Hartlepool |
| 15:00 GMT | Paynter 4' (pen.); Carroll 14'; Gray 53' | Report | Cash 33' | Stadium: Victoria Park; Attendance: 3,947; Referee: Chris Sarginson |

| 15 March 2016 34 | Newport County | 0–0 | Hartlepool United | Newport |
| 19:45 GMT | | Report | | Stadium: Rodney Parade; Attendance: 2,394; Referee: Brendan Malone |

| 19 March 2016 35 | Crawley Town | 0–0 | Hartlepool United | Crawley |
| 15:00 GMT | | Report | | Stadium: Broadfield Stadium; Attendance: 1,883; Referee: David Coote |

| 25 March 2016 36 | Hartlepool United | 1–0 | Wimbledon | Hartlepool |
| 15:00 GMT | Jackson 22' | Report | | Stadium: Victoria Park; Attendance: 4,365; Referee: Darren Deadman |

| 28 March 2016 37 | Leyton Orient | 0–2 | Hartlepool United | Leyton |
| 15:00 GMT | | Report | Paynter 49'; Thomas 69' | Stadium: Brisbane Road; Attendance: 5,543; Referee: Fred Graham |

| 2 April 2016 38 | Hartlepool United | 2–1 | Mansfield Town | Hartlepool |
| 15:00 GMT | Paynter 24' (pen.), 85' (pen.) | Report | Daniel 76' | Stadium: Victoria Park; Attendance: 3,893; Referee: Graham Salisbury |

| 5 April 2016 39 | Carlisle United | 1–0 | Hartlepool United | Carlisle |
| 19:45 GMT | Hope 55' | Report | | Stadium: Brunton Park; Attendance: 4,767; Referee: Darren Bond |

| 9 April 2016 40 | Morecambe | 2–5 | Hartlepool United | Morecambe |
| 15:00 GMT | Kenyon 25'; Barkhuizen 87' | Report | Woods 4'; Thomas 6', 50'; James 76' (pen.); Oates 89' | Stadium: Globe Arena; Attendance: 2,005; Referee: Carl Boyeson |

| 11 April 2016 41 | Notts County | 1–0 | Hartlepool United | Nottingham |
| 19:45 GMT | Stead 55' | Report | | Stadium: Meadow Lane; Attendance: 3,597; Referee: Darren England |

| 16 April 2016 42 | Hartlepool United | 2–1 | York City | Hartlepool |
| 15:00 GMT | Thomas 24'; Woods 72' | Report | Cameron 45' | Stadium: Victoria Park; Attendance: 4,781; Referee: Sebastian Stockbridge |

| 19 April 2016 43 | Hartlepool United | 1–2 | Accrington Stanley | Hartlepool |
| 19:45 GMT | Bingham 25' | Report | Conneely 3'; Fosu 45' | Stadium: Victoria Park; Attendance: 3,445; Referee: Steve Martin |

| 23 April 2016 44 | Oxford United | 2–0 | Hartlepool United | Oxford |
| 15:00 GMT | Roofe 7'; Sercombe 90+3' | Report | | Stadium: Kassam Stadium; Attendance: 7,955; Referee: Chris Kavanagh |

| 30 April 2016 45 | Hartlepool United | 0–2 | Portsmouth | Hartlepool |
| 15:00 | | Report | Naismith 57'; Chaplin 84' | Stadium: Victoria Park; Attendance: 5,046; Referee: Eddie Ilderton |

| 7 May 2016 46 | Plymouth Argyle | 5–0 | Hartlepool United | Plymouth |
| 15:00 | Harvey 6', 25'; Rooney 58', 83'; Nelson 61' | Report | | Stadium: Home Park; Attendance: 10,019; Referee: Darren Deadman |

=== FA Cup ===
On 26 October 2015, the first round draw was made, Hartlepool United were drawn at home against Cheltenham Town.

| 7 November 2015 First round | Hartlepool United | 1–0 | Cheltenham Town | Hartlepool |
| 15:00 | Oyenuga 45' | | | Stadium: Victoria Park; Attendance: 2,287; Referee: James Adcock |

| 4 December 2015 Second round | Salford City | 1–1 | Hartlepool United | Salford |
| 19:55 | O'Halloran 23' | Report | Oates 8' (pen.) | Stadium: Moor Lane; Attendance: 1,400; Referee: Gavin Ward |

| 15 December 2015 Second round replay | Hartlepool United | 2–0 (a.e.t.) | Salford City | Hartlepool |
| 19:45 | Fenwick 97'; Mandron 120' | Report | | Stadium: Victoria Park; Attendance: 4,374; Referee: Jeremy Simpson |

| 9 January 2016 Third round | Hartlepool United | 1–2 | Derby County | Hartlepool |
| 15:00 | Gray 61' | Report | Butterfield 67'; Bent 85' | Stadium: Victoria Park; Attendance: 4,860; Referee: Darren Bond |

=== League Cup ===
On 16 June 2015, the first round draw was made, Hartlepool United were drawn away against Fleetwood Town.

| 11 August 2015 First round | Fleetwood Town | 0–1 | Hartlepool United | Fleetwood |
| 19:45 BST | | Report | Paynter 58' | Stadium: Highbury Stadium; Attendance: 1,892; Referee: Gary Sutton |

| 25 August 2015 Second round | Hartlepool United | 0–4 | Bournemouth | Hartlepool |
| 19:45 BST | | Report | Kermorgant 30'; Gosling 34'; Stanislas 44', 64' | Stadium: Victoria Park; Attendance: 4,890; Referee: Carl Boyeson |

=== Football League Trophy ===
On 8 August 2015, the draw for the first round of the Football League Trophy was drawn by Toni Duggan and Alex Scott live on Soccer AM.

| 1 September 2015 First round | Hartlepool United | 1–1 (3–4 p) | Sheffield United | Hartlepool |
| 19:00 BST | Fenwick 51' | Report | Flynn 7' | Stadium: Victoria Park; Attendance: 2,221; Referee: Scott Duncan |
| | Penalties |
| | Bingham (penalty scored); Oates (penalty scored); Harrison (penalty missed); Fenwick (penalty missed); Featherstone (penalty scored) | | Higdon (penalty scored); Sharp (penalty scored); McNulty (penalty scored); Woolford (penalty missed); McEveley (penalty scored) |

== Squad statistics ==
=== Appearances and goals ===
| No. | Pos | Nat | Player | Total | | League Two | | FA Cup | | League Cup | | Other | |
| No. | Pos | Nat | Player | Apps | Goals | Apps | Goals | Apps | Goals | Apps | Goals | Apps | Goals |
|---|---|---|---|---|---|---|---|---|---|---|---|---|---|
| 1 | GK | (Northern Ireland) NIR | Trevor Carson | 38 | 0 | 34 | 0 | 4 | 0 | 0 | 0 | 0 | 0 |
| 2 | DF | (England) ENG | Carl Magnay | 37 | 1 | 33 | 1 | 2 | 0 | 2 | 0 | 0 | 0 |
| 3 | DF | (Republic of Ireland) IRL | Jake Carroll | 48 | 1 | 41 | 1 | 4 | 0 | 2 | 0 | 1 | 0 |
| 4 | DF | (England) ENG | Harry Worley | 5 | 0 | 3 | 0 | 0 | 0 | 1 | 0 | 1 | 0 |
| 5 | DF | (England) ENG | Scott Harrison | 27 | 1 | 22 | 1 | 2 | 0 | 2 | 0 | 1 | 0 |
| 6 | DF | (England) ENG | Matthew Bates | 35 | 0 | 32 | 0 | 3 | 0 | 0 | 0 | 0 | 0 |
| 7 | MF | (England) ENG | Nathan Thomas | 22 | 5 | 22 | 5 | 0 | 0 | 0 | 0 | 0 | 0 |
| 8 | MF | (England) ENG | Brad Walker | 26 | 1 | 22 | 1 | 3 | 0 | 1 | 0 | 0 | 0 |
| 9 | FW | (England) ENG | Rakish Bingham | 38 | 4 | 31 | 4 | 4 | 0 | 2 | 0 | 1 | 0 |
| 10 | FW | (England) ENG | Billy Paynter | 35 | 15 | 32 | 14 | 1 | 0 | 2 | 1 | 0 | 0 |
| 11 | MF | (England) ENG | Kudus Oyenuga | 9 | 2 | 8 | 1 | 1 | 1 | 0 | 0 | 0 | 0 |
| 12 | MF | (England) ENG | Ebby Nelson-Addy | 3 | 0 | 2 | 0 | 0 | 0 | 0 | 0 | 1 | 0 |
| 13 | GK | (England) ENG | Adam Bartlett | 15 | 0 | 12 | 0 | 0 | 0 | 2 | 0 | 1 | 0 |
| 14 | MF | (England) ENG | Michael Woods | 37 | 3 | 33 | 3 | 2 | 0 | 2 | 0 | 0 | 0 |
| 15 | FW | (England) ENG | Rhys Oates | 45 | 3 | 38 | 2 | 4 | 1 | 2 | 0 | 1 | 0 |
| 16 | MF | (England) ENG | Nicky Featherstone | 51 | 0 | 44 | 0 | 4 | 0 | 2 | 0 | 1 | 0 |
| 17 | FW | (England) ENG | Scott Fenwick | 30 | 6 | 23 | 4 | 4 | 1 | 2 | 0 | 1 | 1 |
| 18 | MF | (England) ENG | Lewis Hawkins | 25 | 2 | 23 | 2 | 1 | 0 | 0 | 0 | 1 | 0 |
| 19 | DF | (England) ENG | Jordan Richards | 12 | 0 | 11 | 0 | 1 | 0 | 0 | 0 | 0 | 0 |
| 20 | DF | (England) ENG | Dan Jones | 12 | 0 | 11 | 0 | 0 | 0 | 0 | 0 | 1 | 0 |
| 21 | DF | (England) ENG | Michael Duckworth | 18 | 0 | 13 | 0 | 2 | 0 | 2 | 0 | 1 | 0 |
| 22 | DF | (England) ENG | Josh Nearney | 1 | 0 | 0 | 0 | 0 | 0 | 0 | 0 | 1 | 0 |
| 23 | MF | (England) ENG | Connor Smith | 7 | 0 | 5 | 0 | 1 | 0 | 1 | 0 | 0 | 0 |
| 26 | DF | (England) ENG | Andrew Boyce | 9 | 0 | 8 | 0 | 0 | 0 | 1 | 0 | 0 | 0 |
| 26 | DF | (England) ENG | Adam Jackson | 33 | 3 | 29 | 3 | 4 | 0 | 0 | 0 | 0 | 0 |
| 27 | DF | (England) ENG | Brad Halliday | 6 | 0 | 6 | 0 | 0 | 0 | 0 | 0 | 0 | 0 |
| 27 | DF | (England) ENG | Luke Hendrie | 3 | 0 | 3 | 0 | 0 | 0 | 0 | 0 | 0 | 0 |
| 27 | MF | (England) ENG | Jack Blackford | 1 | 0 | 1 | 0 | 0 | 0 | 0 | 0 | 0 | 0 |
| 28 | MF | (England) ENG | Jason Banton | 5 | 0 | 4 | 0 | 1 | 0 | 0 | 0 | 0 | 0 |
| 28 | MF | (England) ENG | Josh Laurent | 3 | 0 | 3 | 0 | 0 | 0 | 0 | 0 | 0 | 0 |
| 29 | DF | (England) ENG | Magnus Okuonghae | 4 | 0 | 4 | 0 | 0 | 0 | 0 | 0 | 0 | 0 |
| 29 | DF | (England) ENG | Rob Jones | 7 | 0 | 7 | 0 | 0 | 0 | 0 | 0 | 0 | 0 |
| 30 | MF | (England) ENG | Jake Gray | 33 | 6 | 29 | 5 | 4 | 1 | 0 | 0 | 0 | 0 |
| 32 | FW | (France) FRA | Mikael Mandron | 7 | 1 | 5 | 0 | 2 | 1 | 0 | 0 | 0 | 0 |
| 32 | FW | (Wales) WAL | Ellis Harrison | 2 | 0 | 2 | 0 | 0 | 0 | 0 | 0 | 0 | 0 |
| 33 | MF | (Scotland) SCO | Kal Naismith | 4 | 0 | 4 | 0 | 0 | 0 | 0 | 0 | 0 | 0 |
| 33 | FW | (England) ENG | Luke James | 20 | 1 | 20 | 1 | 0 | 0 | 0 | 0 | 0 | 0 |

=== Goalscorers ===
| Rank | Name | League Two | FA Cup | League Cup | Other | Total |
|---|---|---|---|---|---|---|
| 1 | Billy Paynter | 14 | 0 | 1 | 0 | 15 |
| 2 | Scott Fenwick | 4 | 1 | 0 | 1 | 6 |
| 2 | Jake Gray | 5 | 1 | 0 | 0 | 6 |
| 3 | Nathan Thomas | 5 | 0 | 0 | 0 | 5 |
| 4 | Rakish Bingham | 4 | 0 | 0 | 0 | 4 |
| 5 | Adam Jackson | 3 | 0 | 0 | 0 | 3 |
| 5 | Rhys Oates | 2 | 1 | 0 | 0 | 3 |
| 5 | Michael Woods | 3 | 0 | 0 | 0 | 3 |
| 6 | Lewis Hawkins | 2 | 0 | 0 | 0 | 2 |
| 6 | Kudus Oyenuga | 1 | 1 | 0 | 0 | 2 |
| 7 | Jake Carroll | 1 | 0 | 0 | 0 | 1 |
| 7 | Scott Harrison | 1 | 0 | 0 | 0 | 1 |
| 7 | Luke James | 1 | 0 | 0 | 0 | 1 |
| 7 | Carl Magnay | 1 | 0 | 0 | 0 | 1 |
| 7 | Mikael Mandron | 0 | 1 | 0 | 0 | 1 |
| 7 | Brad Walker | 1 | 0 | 0 | 0 | 1 |

=== Clean Sheets ===
| Rank | Name | League Two | FA Cup | League Cup | Other | Total |
|---|---|---|---|---|---|---|
| 1 | Trevor Carson | 7 | 2 | 0 | 0 | 9 |
| 2 | Adam Bartlett | 3 | 0 | 1 | 0 | 4 |

=== Penalties ===
| Date | Name | Opposition | Scored? |
|---|---|---|---|
| 29 August 2015 | Billy Paynter | Carlisle United | ✓ |
| 12 September 2015 | Rakish Bingham | Exeter City | ✗ |
| 15 November 2015 | Kudus Oyenuga | Leyton Orient | ✓ |
| 4 December 2015 | Rhys Oates | Salford City | ✓ |
| 19 December 2015 | Scott Fenwick | Plymouth Argyle | ✓ |
| 13 February 2016 | Billy Paynter | Yeovil Town | ✓ |
| 12 March 2016 | Billy Paynter | Dagenham and Redbridge | ✓ |
| 2 April 2016 | Billy Paynter | Mansfield Town | ✓ |
| 2 April 2016 | Billy Paynter | Mansfield Town | ✓ |
| 9 April 2016 | Luke James | Morecambe | ✓ |

=== Suspensions ===
| Date Incurred | Name | Games Missed | Reason |
|---|---|---|---|
| 5 September 2015 | Carl Magnay | 3 | (red card) (vs. Wycombe Wanderers) |
| 26 September 2015 | Michael Woods | 1 | Yellow card |
| 2 October 2015 | Carl Magnay | 6 | Spitting at a spectator |
| 24 October 2015 | Scott Harrison | 3 | (red card) (vs. Crawley Town) |

== Awards ==
=== Club Awards ===
On 4 May 2016, Hartlepool United held their annual club awards night at The Grand Hotel, Hartlepool.

| Award | Winner |
|---|---|
| Players Player Of The Year | Trevor Carson |
| Fans Player Of The Year | Trevor Carson |
| Young Player Of The Year | Adam Jackson |
| Away Player Of The Year | Billy Paynter |
| Community Player Of The Year | Trevor Carson |
| Goal Of The Season | Lewis Hawkins vs Barnet |
| Ken Johnson Trophy | Sam Collins |
