= Connor Smith =

Connor Smith may refer to:

- Connor Smith (footballer, born 1993), Irish football midfielder
- Connor Smith (footballer, born 1996), English football winger
- Connor Smith (footballer, born 2002), Scottish football midfielder

== See also ==
- Conner Smith (born 2000), American country music singer
- Con Smith, a character in the video game Killer7
