= Scott Harrison (footballer) =

English footballer

Personal information
- Full name: Scott Nathan Harrison
- Date of birth: 3 September 1993 (age 33)
- Place of birth: Middlesbrough, England
- Height: 6 ft 2 in (1.88 m)
- Position: Defender

Senior career*
| Years | Team | Apps | (Gls) |
| 2011–2012 | Darlington | 10 | (0) |
| 2012–2015 | Sunderland | 0 | (0) |
| 2013 | → Bury (loan) | 1 | (0) |
| 2014 | → Hartlepool United (loan) | 6 | (0) |
| 2014 | → Hartlepool United (loan) | 13 | (0) |
| 2015 | → Hartlepool United (loan) | 5 | (0) |
| 2015–2016 | Hartlepool United | 48 | (1) |
| 2016–2018 | Hartlepool United | 57 | (2) |
| 2018–2019 | Falkirk | 15 | (2) |
| 2019 | → Spennymoor Town (loan) | 12 | (2) |
| 2019 | Spennymoor Town | 0 | (0) |
| Total | | 167 | (7) |
- * Club domestic league appearances and goals as of 21:12, 15 May 2019 (UTC)

Scott Nathan Harrison (born 3 September 1993) is an English former professional footballer who played as a defender. He played in the Football League for Hartlepool United and briefly for Bury and in the Scottish Championship for Falkirk, as well as in non-league football.

== Career ==
Harrison began his career with Darlington, and made 10 Conference Premier appearances in the 2011–12 season before joining Sunderland in October 2012 after a trial. He joined League Two club Bury on loan in November 2013 and made his Football League debut against York City on 29 December. Together with Sunderland team-mate Connor Oliver, Harrison joined Hartlepool United in March 2014 on loan for the remainder of the season.

Harrison rejoined Hartlepool United for a second one-month loan spell on 22 August 2014, later extended to three months. He returned on 3 January 2015 on loan until the end of the season, and the loan was converted to a permanent contract on 2 February. He was named Football League Young Player of the Month for March, helped the team avoid relegation, and was voted Hartlepool's Supporters' Player of the Year and Players' Player of the Year.

He was one of three players released by Hartlepool at the end of the 2015–16 season, but re-signed for the club in August. He signed a new deal in March 2017, but struggled for form in the 2017–18 season, and was released from his contract in June 2018 to join Scottish Championship club Falkirk.

Harrison joined National League North club Spennymoor Town on loan in January 2019, and signed permanently at the end of the season. During pre-season, he suffered an injury that would see him ruled out for the rest of the 2019–20 season. He departed the club by mutual consent in December 2019.

== Career statistics ==
Appearances and goals by club, season and competition
| Club | Season | League | | | National cup (Note: Includes FA Cup, Scottish Cup) | | League cup (Note: Includes Football League Cup, Scottish League Cup) | | Other | | Total | |
| Club | Season | Division | Apps | Goals | Apps | Goals | Apps | Goals | Apps | Goals | Apps | Goals |
|---|---|---|---|---|---|---|---|---|---|---|---|---|
| Darlington | 2011–12 | Conference Premier | 10 | 0 | 0 | 0 | — | | 1 (Note: Appearance in FA Trophy) | 0 | 11 | 0 |
| Sunderland | 2012–13 | Premier League | 0 | 0 | 0 | 0 | 0 | 0 | — | | 0 | 0 |
| Sunderland | 2013–14 | Premier League | 0 | 0 | 0 | 0 | 0 | 0 | — | | 0 | 0 |
| Sunderland | 2014–15 | Premier League | 0 | 0 | — | | — | | — | | 0 | 0 |
| Sunderland | Total | | 0 | 0 | 0 | 0 | 0 | 0 | — | | 0 | 0 |
| Bury (loan) | 2013–14 | League Two | 1 | 0 | — | | — | | — | | 1 | 0 |
| Hartlepool United (loan) | 2013–14 | League Two | 6 | 0 | — | | — | | — | | 6 | 0 |
| Hartlepool United | 2014–15 (Note: The first 19 appearances (18 league, without scoring, and 1 Football League Trophy) were made while on loan from Sunderland.) | League Two | 36 | 1 | 0 | 0 | — | | 1 (Note: Appearance(s) in Football League Trophy) | 0 | 37 | 1 |
| Hartlepool United | 2015–16 | League Two | 22 | 1 | 2 | 0 | 2 | 0 | 1 | 0 | 27 | 1 |
| Hartlepool United | 2016–17 | League Two | 38 | 1 | 0 | 0 | 0 | 0 | 3 (Note: Appearances in EFL Trophy) | 0 | 41 | 1 |
| Hartlepool United | 2017–18 | National League | 27 | 0 | 1 | 0 | — | | 1 | 0 | 29 | 0 |
| Hartlepool United | Total | | 129 | 3 | 3 | 0 | 2 | 0 | 6 | 0 | 140 | 3 |
| Falkirk | 2018–19 | Scottish Championship | 15 | 2 | 0 | 0 | 3 | 0 | 2 (Note: Appearances in Scottish Challenge Cup) | 1 | 20 | 3 |
| Spennymoor Town (loan) | 2018–19 | National League North | 12 | 2 | — | | — | | 3 (Note: Appearances in National League North play-offs) | 0 | 15 | 2 |
| Career total | | | 167 | 7 | 3 | 0 | 5 | 0 | 12 | 1 | 187 | 8 |

== Honours ==
- Football League Young Player of the Month: March 2015
- Hartlepool United Player of the Year: 2014–15
