= Alan Woods (footballer) =

English footballer (1937–2021)

Personal information
- Full name: Alan Edward Woods
- Date of birth: 15 February 1937
- Place of birth: Dinnington, South Yorkshire
- Date of death: 28 September 2021 (aged 84)
- Position: Wing half

Senior career*
Years	Team	Apps	(Gls)
1954–1956	Tottenham Hotspur	6	(0)
1956–1960	Swansea City	30	(0)
1960–1967	York City	228	(4)
- Boston United

International career
1955	England Youth		
- * Club domestic league appearances and goals

Alan Edward Woods (15 February 1937 – 28 September 2021) was an English footballer who played as a wing half. Woods was capped by the England national youth team in 1955 while a Tottenham Hotspur player. He died in September 2021.

His son Neil Woods and grandson Michael Woods are also active in football.
