= Jake Gray (footballer) =

English footballer

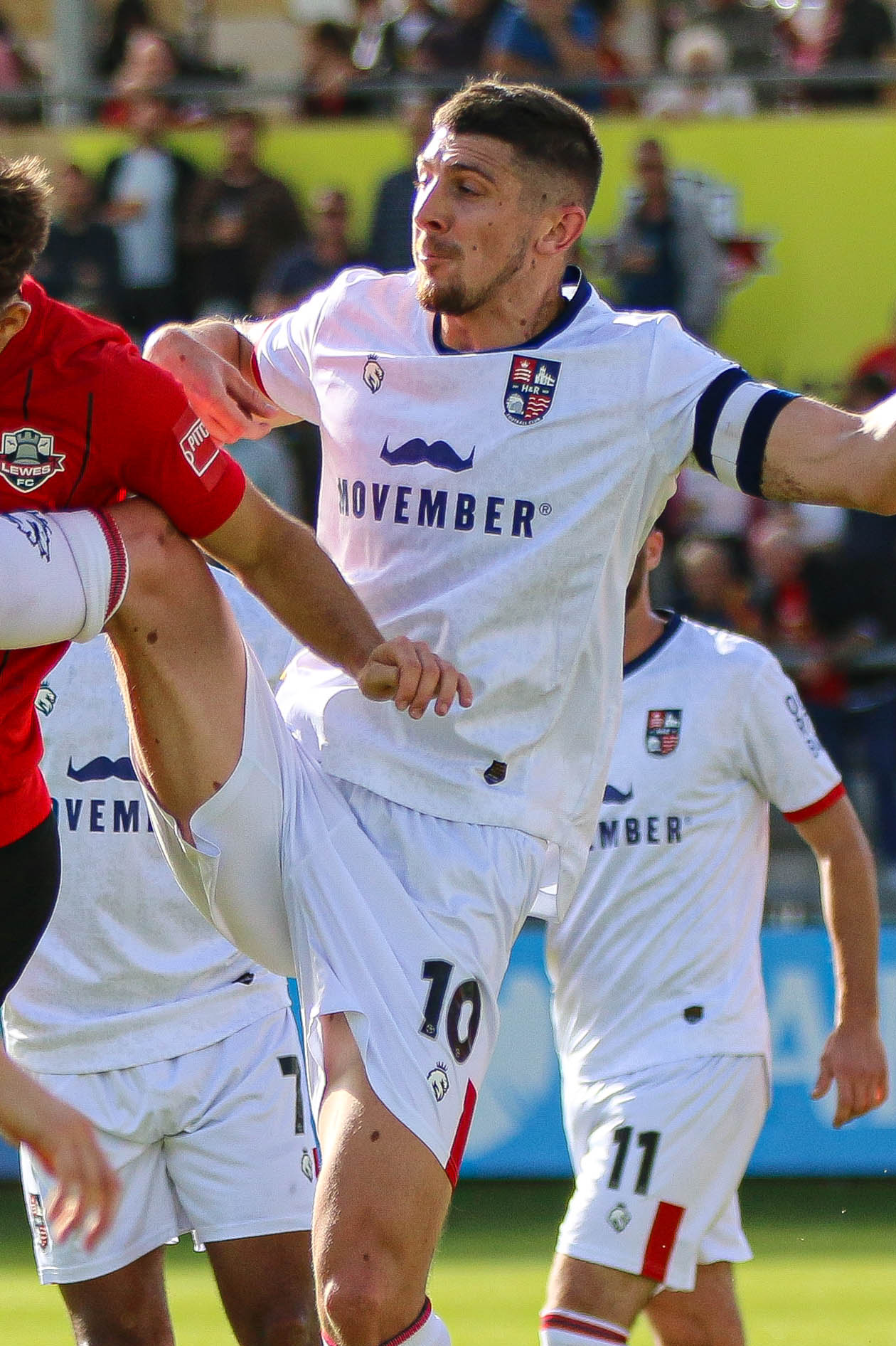
- Gray playing for Hampton & Richmond Borough in September 2023

Personal information
- Full name: Jake Stephen Gray
- Date of birth: 25 December 1995 (age 30)
- Place of birth: Aylesbury, England
- Height: 5 ft 11 in (1.80 m)
- Position: Midfielder

Team information
- Current team: Hemel Hempstead Town
- Number: 8

Youth career
- –2012: Wycombe Wanderers
- 2012–2013: Crystal Palace

Senior career*
Years	Team	Apps	(Gls)
2013–2016	Crystal Palace	0	(0)
2015	→ Cheltenham Town (loan)	4	(0)
2015–2016	→ Hartlepool United (loan)	29	(5)
2016–2017	Luton Town	19	(1)
2017–2019	Yeovil Town	56	(5)
2019–2020	Woking	5	(0)
2019	→ Hampton & Richmond Borough (loan)	7	(2)
2020	→ Hampton & Richmond Borough (loan)	9	(2)
2020–2025	Hampton & Richmond Borough	157	(20)
2025–	Hemel Hempstead Town	28	(1)
- * Club domestic league appearances and goals as of 01:17, 22 May 2026 (UTC)

Jake Stephen Gray (born 25 December 1995) is an English professional footballer who plays as a midfielder for Hemel Hempstead Town of the National League South.

== Club career ==
Gray was born in Aylesbury, Buckinghamshire and attended Grange School. He began his career at Wycombe Wanderers before joining Crystal Palace when he was fifteen, after Wycombe Wanderers closed their academy at the start of 2012–13. He progressed through the youth system and development squads, before signing his first professional contract, effective from 1 January 2013 until the end of 2014–15. Gray made his professional debut as a 62nd-minute substitute for Dwight Gayle in a 3–0 win away to Walsall in the League Cup second round on 26 August 2014. He also featured in the third round as a 90th-minute substitute for Paddy McCarthy which resulted in a 3–2 defeat to Newcastle United after extra time. Following the expiry of his previous contract, Gray signed a new two-year contract with the club on 2 July 2015.

On 16 January 2015, Gray joined League Two club Cheltenham Town on a one-month loan. He made both his Football League and Cheltenham debut in a 1–1 draw with Luton Town on 24 January. Gray made three further appearances before returning to Crystal Palace, despite being keen on an extension.

On 5 November 2015, Gray joined League Two club Hartlepool United on a one-month youth loan. Two days later, he made his Hartlepool debut in a 1–0 win over former loan club Cheltenham Town in the FA Cup first round. Gray followed up with a brace, his first professional goals in a 3–1 win at home to Leyton Orient eight days later. After making three appearances for Hartlepool, Gray's loan was extended until 2 January 2016. On 5 January, his loan spell at Hartlepool was extended until the end of the season, by now having made eight appearances for the club. Gray's next appearance saw him score the opening goal with a volley during a 2–1 defeat at home to Derby County in the FA Cup third round, before his opponents came from behind to win the match. Gray went on to complete his loan spell, making 33 appearances and scoring six goals for the club in 2015–16.

On 1 August 2016, Gray signed a two-year contract with League Two club Luton Town on a free transfer. Under the terms of the transfer, Crystal Palace would be due a contingency sum in any event of a future sale. He made his Luton debut as a substitute on the opening day of 2016–17 in a 3–0 win away to Plymouth Argyle. Gray scored his first goal for the club in a 3–1 win at home to newly relegated Championship club Aston Villa in the EFL Cup first round on 10 August. After the end of the season, Gray was transfer-listed by Luton, having made 28 appearances and scored four goals in 2016–17.

On 26 June 2017, Gray signed for fellow League Two club Yeovil Town on a two-year contract for an undisclosed fee. At the end of the 2018–19 season, Gray was released by Yeovil following the club's relegation from the English Football League.

Gray signed for National League club Woking on 25 August 2019. In September 2019, he joined Hampton & Richmond Borough of the National League South on a one-month loan. While on loan, this was extended for a further month. Gray returned to Woking in November but was unable to hold a regular starting place in the team. On the 10 January it was announced that he would be returning to Hampton & Richmond for a further five weeks.

On 2 August 2020, it was announced that Gray would return to Hampton & Richmond Borough on a permanent basis ahead of the 2020–21 campaign. He was awarded the National League South Player of the Month award for March 2023.

== Career statistics ==
As of match played 28 April 2026

Appearances and goals by club, season and competition
Club	Season	League			FA Cup		League Cup		Other		Total	
Club	Season	Division	Apps	Goals	Apps	Goals	Apps	Goals	Apps	Goals	Apps	Goals
Crystal Palace	2014–15	Premier League	0	0	0	0	2	0	—		2	0
Crystal Palace	2015–16	Premier League	0	0	—		0	0	—		0	0
Crystal Palace	Total		0	0	0	0	2	0	—		2	0
Cheltenham Town (loan)	2014–15	League Two	4	0	—		—		—		4	0
Hartlepool United (loan)	2015–16	League Two	29	5	4	1	—		—		33	6
Luton Town	2016–17	League Two	19	1	1	1	2	1	6 (Note: Appearances in EFL Trophy)	1	28	4
Yeovil Town	2017–18	League Two	26	3	4	0	1	0	6	1	37	4
Yeovil Town	2018–19	League Two	30	2	1	0	0	0	3	0	34	2
Yeovil Town	Total		56	5	5	0	1	0	9	1	71	6
Woking	2019–20	National League	5	0	—		—		0	0	5	0
Hampton & Richmond Borough (loan)	2019–20	National League South	16	4	2	0	—		1 (Note: Appearances in FA Trophy)	0	19	4
Hampton & Richmond Borough	2020–21	National League South	17	2	4	0	—		1	0	22	2
Hampton & Richmond Borough	2021–22	National League South	27	4	3	0	—		1	0	31	4
Hampton & Richmond Borough	2022–23	National League South	46	5	4	1	—		1	0	51	6
Hampton & Richmond Borough	2023–24	National League South	42	5	2	0	—		4	0	48	5
Hampton & Richmond Borough	2024–25	National League South	25	4	0	0	—		2	1	27	5
Hampton & Richmond Borough	Total		173	24	15	1	—		10	1	198	26
Hemel Hempstead Town	2025–26	National League South	28	1	3	2	—		1	0	32	3
Career total			314	36	28	5	5	1	26	3	373	45
