= Lewis Hawkins =

English footballer (born 1993)

Personal information
- Full name: Lewis Henry Hawkins
- Date of birth: 15 June 1993 (age 33)
- Place of birth: Middlesbrough, England
- Height: 5 ft 10 in (1.78 m)
- Position: Midfielder

Team information
- Current team: Redcar Athletic

Youth career
- –2011: Hartlepool United

Senior career*
Years	Team	Apps	(Gls)
2011–2019	Hartlepool United	114	(2)
2011	→ Whitby Town (loan)	6	(0)
2015	→ Spennymoor Town (loan)	3	(0)
2015–2016	→ Spennymoor Town (loan)	4	(0)
2018	→ York City (loan)	6	(0)
2019	→ Spennymoor Town (loan)	8	(0)
2019	Guisborough Town	5	(1)
2019–2020	Blyth Spartans	26	(1)
2020–2026	Whitby Town	165	(10)
2026–	Redcar Athletic	0	(0)
- * Club domestic league appearances and goals as of 22:40, 17 May 2026 (UTC)

Lewis Henry Hawkins (born 15 June 1993) is an English footballer who plays as a midfielder for Redcar Athletic.

Hawkins has previously played for Hartlepool United, York City, Spennymoor Town, Blyth Spartans, Guisborough Town and Whitby Town.

== Career ==
Hawkins was born in Middlesbrough, Yorkshire.

=== Hartlepool United ===
He started his career in the youth team of Hartlepool United on a two-year scholarship. In September 2011, Hawkins was sent on work experience to Whitby Town of the Northern Premier League Premier Division. He made seven appearances for Whitby, one of which came in the FA Cup. He made his first-team debut on 10 March 2012, in a 0–0 draw with Walsall, replacing the injured James Poole in the starting line-up.

Hawkins joined Spennymoor Town on 6 February 2015 on a one-month loan, but was recalled by Hartlepool manager Ronnie Moore after three matches, with Spennymoor boss Jason Ainsley saying: "He has been brilliant in his spell for us, even though he only played three games. He gave us an extra dimension". Hawkins rejoined Spennymoor on 20 October on a three-month loan.

Hawkins scored his first two goals in professional football within six minutes of each other in a 3–1 win over Barnet in March 2016. His first goal of the match won Hartlepool's Goal of the Season award.

Hawkins signed a new one-year contract with the club at the end of the 2017–18 season. He joined National League North club York City on 3 November 2018 on loan until 3 January 2019. He made his debut on the same day as joining, starting in a 4–1 defeat at home to Bradford (Park Avenue) in the league. Hawkins was recalled by Hartlepool on 15 December 2018. He made nine appearances in all competitions for York, scoring once in an FA Trophy game against Kidderminster Harriers.

Hawkins joined National League North club Spennymoor Town on 22 March 2019 on loan until the end of the 2018–19 season. On 1 May 2019, Hawkins scored the winner for Spennymoor in their play-off quarter final game against Bradford Park Avenue and four days later, he scored the winning penalty in the penalty shoot-out against Brackley Town to send Spennymoor through to the National League North play-off final against Chorley.

Hawkins was released by Hartlepool at the end of the 2018–19 season.

=== Guisborough Town ===
Following his release from Hartlepool, Hawkins went on trial with National League side Yeovil Town in July 2019. The following month, Hawkins signed for Northern League Division One side Guisborough Town making his debut in a 2–0 victory over Seaham Red Star.

=== Blyth Spartans ===
Hawkins moved to National League North side Blyth Spartans on 31 August 2019. Hawkins left Blyth at the end of the end of 2019–2020 season following the expiration of his contract. He played 27 times for Blyth in all competitions, scoring twice.

=== Whitby Town ===
On 26 August 2020, Hawkins signed for Whitby Town the club he had previously played for on loan while at Hartlepool. He made his second debut for The Seasiders in a 1–1 draw in the FA Cup first qualifying round against Warrington Rylands in September 2020.

At the end of the 2021–22 season, Hawkins signed a new one-year contract with Whitby.

In May 2024, he signed a new contract with The Seasiders. Upon signing, Whitby boss Nathan Haslam said: "Lewis has been excellent for us. He's been a model of consistency and I believe he played a big part in our success this season."

In the 2025–26 season, Hawkins began captaining Whitby Town. In a game against Morpeth Town in April 2026, Hawkins reacted to being substituted by throwing his captain's armband on the ground before kicking an advertising hoarding. The following day, Hawkins apologised for his actions stating they were "out of character" and in the "heat of the moment".

In May 2026, Hawkins turned down a new contract with Whitby.

== Career statistics ==
As of match played 25 April 2026

Appearances and goals by club, season and competition
Club	Season	League			FA Cup		League Cup		Other		Total	
Club	Season	Division	Apps	Goals	Apps	Goals	Apps	Goals	Apps	Goals	Apps	Goals
Hartlepool United	2011–12	League One	1	0	0	0	0	0	0	0	1	0
Hartlepool United	2012–13	League One	1	0	0	0	0	0	0	0	1	0
Hartlepool United	2013–14	League Two	5	0	0	0	0	0	0	0	5	0
Hartlepool United	2014–15	League Two	12	0	0	0	0	0	1 (Note: Appearance in Football League Trophy)	0	13	0
Hartlepool United	2015–16	League Two	22	2	1	0	0	0	1	0	24	2
Hartlepool United	2016–17	League Two	34	0	2	0	0	0	2 (Note: Appearances in EFL Trophy)	0	38	0
Hartlepool United	2017–18	National League	35	0	1	0	—		1 (Note: Appearance(s) in FA Trophy)	0	37	0
Hartlepool United	2018–19	National League	4	0	0	0	—		—		4	0
Hartlepool United	Total		114	2	4	0	0	0	5	0	123	2
York City (loan)	2018–19	National League North	6	0	1	0	—		2	1	9	1
Spennymoor Town (loan)	2018–19	National League North	8	0	—		—		3 (Note: Appearances in National League North play-offs)	1	11	1
Blyth Spartans	2019–20	National League North	26	1	0	0	—		1	1	27	2
Whitby Town	2020–21	NPL Premier Division	8	0	1	0	0	0	1	0	10	0
Whitby Town	2021–22	NPL Premier Division	32	3	3	0	0	0	3	0	38	3
Whitby Town	2022–23	NPL Premier Division	39	2	2	0	0	0	3	0	44	2
Whitby Town	2023–24	NPL Premier Division	34	2	5	0	0	0	2	0	41	2
Whitby Town	2024–25	NPL Premier Division	32	2	2	0	0	0	1	0	35	2
Whitby Town	2025–26	NPL Premier Division	30	1	0	0	0	0	1	0	31	1
Whitby Town	Total		165	10	13	0	0	0	11	0	199	10
Career total			329	13	18	0	0	0	22	3	369	16
