= Scott Fenwick =

English footballer (born 1990)

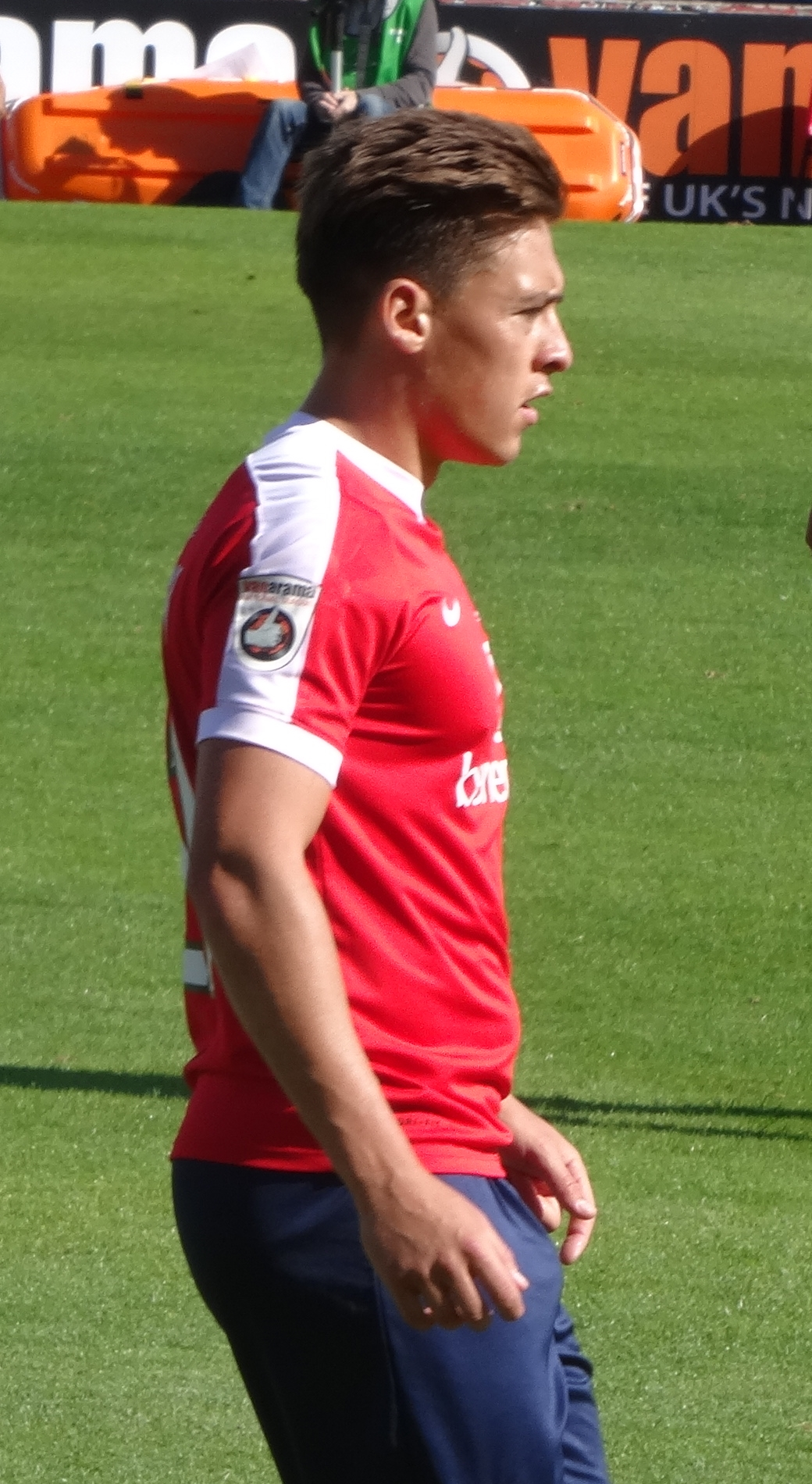
- Fenwick playing for York City in 2016

Personal information
- Full name: Scott James Fenwick
- Date of birth: 9 April 1990 (age 36)
- Place of birth: Gateshead, England
- Height: 6 ft 0 in (1.84 m)
- Position: Striker

Youth career
- Newcastle United
- Sunderland
- Middlesbrough

Senior career*
| Years | Team | Apps | (Gls) |
| 2009–2010 | Gretna | 51 | (19) |
| 2010–2012 | Newcastle Benfield | 56 | (24) |
| 2012–2014 | Durham City | 71 | (56) |
| 2014 | Dunston UTS | 12 | (7) |
| 2014–2016 | Hartlepool United | 86 | (38) |
| 2016 | → Tranmere Rovers (loan) | 25 | (11) |
| 2016–2017 | York City | 51 | (12) |
| 2017 | Darlington | 14 | (6) |
| 2017–2018 | Naxxar Lions | 47 | (22) |
| 2018–2019 | Chelmsford City | 47 | (19) |
| 2019–2020 | Blyth Spartans | 11 | (0) |
| 2020 | Cork City | 26 | (6) |
| 2021 | Forfar Athletic | 11 | (7) |
| 2022 | Workington | 16 | (10) |
| 2022–2024 | Consett | 34 | (11) |
| 2024 | Altona East Phoenix | 16 | (14) |
| 2024–2025 | Grimsby Borough | 27 | (10) |
| 2025 | Lincoln United | 14 | (10) |
| 2025 | Newton Aycliffe | 10 | (9) |
| 2025–2026 | Lincoln United | 5 | (0) |
| 2026– | Hallam | 10 | (4) |
- * Club domestic league appearances and goals as of 17:41, 24 May 2026 (UTC)

Scott James Fenwick (born 9 April 1990) is an English professional footballer who last played as a striker for Northern Premier League Division One East club Hallam. He played in the Football League for Hartlepool United and for League of Ireland club Cork City.

== Career ==
=== Early career ===
Fenwick was born in Gateshead, Tyne and Wear. He played for Newcastle United, Sunderland and Middlesbrough academies before joining Gretna in 2009. He left the latter in the same year, and subsequently joined Newcastle Benfield in 2010.

In August 2012, Fenwick signed with Durham City, scoring 18 goals from 32 appearances in his first season and 33 goals from 41 appearances in the second. He moved to fellow Northern League team Dunston UTS in June 2014, and scored 13 goals in all competitions, of which 7 came from his 12 league appearances.

=== Hartlepool United ===
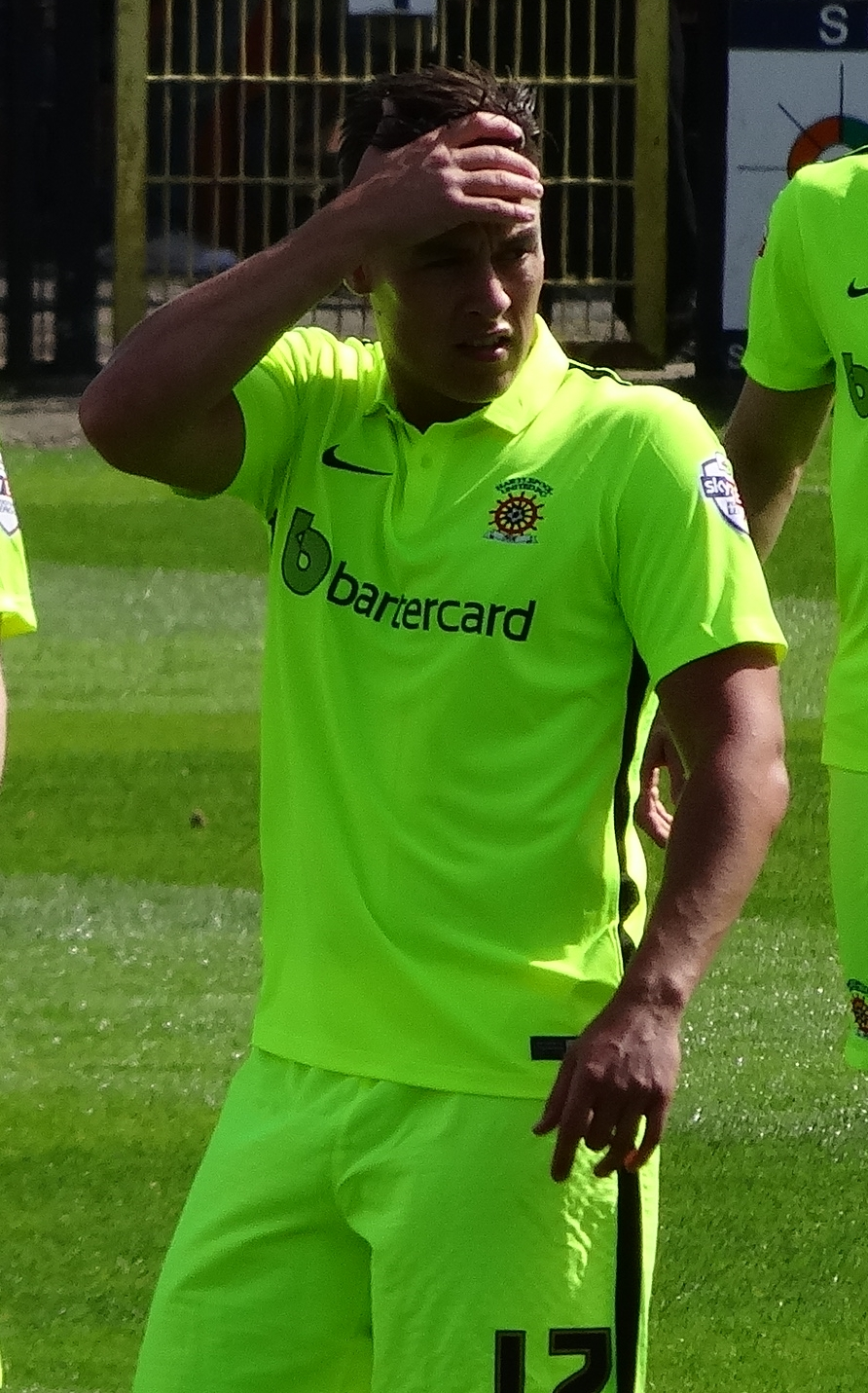
Fenwick playing for Hartlepool United in 2015

On 7 November 2014, Fenwick signed an 18-month contract with Hartlepool United. He made his professional debut eight days later, replacing Matt Crooks in a 1–0 defeat against Southend United.

Fenwick was handed his first start on 22 November 2014, and scored his team's only goal in a 3–1 defeat at home to York City.

Fenwick scored three goals in five matches during January 2015 against Cheltenham Town, Tranmere Rovers and Plymouth Argyle and formed a good partnership with strike partner Rakish Bingham to help Pools get their first wins for three months. Unfortunately for Fenwick, after scoring Hartlepool's only goal in a 3–1 defeat at home to Stevenage on 14 February, he was ruled out for six weeks with an ankle injury. He returned in time for Hartlepool's relegation battle and scored the opening goal in a crucial 2–1 win against Exeter City which confirmed Pools' survival.

Fenwick started the 2015–16 season partnering Rakish Bingham and Billy Paynter up front, helping Hartlepool win their first four matches and scoring the winner in a 1–0 home win against Newport County. Despite scoring against Newport, Fenwick was dropped for Rhys Oates but returned for the Football League Trophy match at home to Sheffield United, scoring Pools' equaliser but missed a penalty in the shoot-out. Fenwick was once again dropped to the bench but returned against Yeovil Town to score Pools' opening goal in a 2–1 away win.

=== York City ===
On 4 July 2016, Fenwick joined newly relegated National League club York City on a one-year contract, with the option of a second year. He made his debut when starting their 1–1 away draw with Maidstone United on 6 August 2016, in the opening match of 2016–17. According to Dave Flett of The Press, Fenwick found the "going tough in attack", and was substituted for Richard Brodie in the 84th minute. He was an unused substitute as York beat Macclesfield Town 3–2 at Wembley Stadium in the 2017 FA Trophy Final. He was released by York at the end of the 2016–17 season.

=== Later career ===
Fenwick signed for National League North club Darlington on 4 August 2017 after a successful trial. After making four substitute appearances in 25 days, he left the club by mutual consent. He signed for Maltese Premier League club Naxxar Lions, and made his debut on 10 September 2017, starting in a 0–0 away draw with Valletta. After four goals from twelve league appearances and two goals in the Maltese FA Trophy, Fenwick was released by mutual consent on 2 January 2018 because he wanted to return home.

Fenwick signed for National League South club Chelmsford City on 9 March 2018. He scored a hat-trick of penalties for Chelmsford on 9 April in their 4–2 win against Whitehawk, becoming the first player in the history of the club to do so. Five days later, Fenwick scored a hat-trick of penalties for the second consecutive match, scoring all four Chelmsford goals in a 4–2 win against East Thurrock United. On 13 May 2019, Chelmsford announced the departure of Fenwick.

On 14 June 2019, Fenwick returned to North East England, signing for Blyth Spartans. His season was disrupted by injury, and he made only 11 appearances in the National League North before being released at the end of his contract.

In late July 2020, he signed for League of Ireland club Cork City until the end of the season.

In March 2021, Fenwick joined Scottish League One club Forfar Athletic until the end of the season. He scored his first goals in a brace away to Partick Thistle, and finished the season with four goals from 13 matches in all competitions.

Fenwick signed for Northern Premier League Division One West club Workington on 3 January 2022. He made 16 appearances, mainly as a substitute, and scored once as Workington reached and lost to Marine in the play-offs.

In October 2022, after training with the club for some weeks to maintain fitness, Fenwick signed for Consett of the Northern Premier League East Division.

In February 2024, Fenwick again moved abroad, signing for Australian club Altona East Phoenix.

Fenwick returned to English football in September 2024 when he joined Northern Premier League East Division club Grimsby Borough.

In June 2025, Fenwick signed for Lincoln United. In September 2025, Fenwick left Lincoln United. After departing Lincoln United, Fenwick signed for Newton Aycliffe, before rejoining Lincoln United. On 4 February 2026, Fenwick signed for Hallam.

== Career statistics ==
As of match played 25 April 2026

Appearances and goals by club, season and competition
| Club | Season | League | | | National cup (Note: Includes FA Cup, Maltese FA Trophy, FAI Cup, Scottish Cup and Australia Cup) | | League cup | | Other | | Total | |
| Club | Season | Division | Apps | Goals | Apps | Goals | Apps | Goals | Apps | Goals | Apps | Goals |
|---|---|---|---|---|---|---|---|---|---|---|---|---|
| Hartlepool United | 2014–15 | League Two | 19 | 6 | 0 | 0 | — | | — | | 19 | 6 |
| Hartlepool United | 2015–16 | League Two | 23 | 4 | 4 | 1 | 2 | 0 | 1 (Note: Appearance in Football League Trophy) | 1 | 30 | 6 |
| Hartlepool United | Total | | 42 | 10 | 4 | 1 | 2 | 0 | 1 | 1 | 49 | 12 |
| Tranmere Rovers (loan) | 2015–16 | National League | 3 | 0 | — | | — | | — | | 3 | 0 |
| York City | 2016–17 | National League | 24 | 2 | 1 | 0 | — | | 4 (Note: Appearances in FA Trophy) | 1 | 29 | 3 |
| Darlington | 2017–18 | National League North | 4 | 0 | — | | — | | — | | 4 | 0 |
| Naxxar Lions | 2017–18 | Maltese Premier League | 12 | 4 | 1 | 2 | — | | — | | 13 | 6 |
| Chelmsford City | 2017–18 | National League South | 10 | 11 | — | | — | | 1 (Note: Appearance in National League South play-offs) | 0 | 11 | 11 |
| Chelmsford City | 2018–19 | National League South | 37 | 8 | 0 | 0 | — | | 2 (Note: One appearance in FA Trophy, one appearance and one goal in National League South play-offs) | 1 | 39 | 9 |
| Chelmsford City | Total | | 47 | 19 | 0 | 0 | — | | 3 | 1 | 50 | 20 |
| Blyth Spartans | 2019–20 | National League North | 11 | 0 | | | — | | | | 11 | 0 |
| Cork City | 2020 | League of Ireland Premier Division | 6 | 0 | 1 | 0 | — | | — | | 7 | 0 |
| Forfar Athletic | 2020–21 | Scottish League One | 11 | 4 | 2 | 0 | — | | 0 | 0 | 13 | 4 |
| Workington | 2021–22 | Northern Premier League (NPL); Division One West | 14 | 1 | — | | — | | 2 (Note: One appearance in Northern Premier League Division One West play-offs, one in Cumberland Senior Cup) | 0 | 16 | 1 |
| Consett | 2022–23 | NPL East Division | 15 | 4 | — | | — | | 1 (Note: Appearance in Durham Challenge Cup) | 0 | 16 | 4 |
| Altona East Phoenix | 2024 | Victorian State League 2 North-West | 16 | 14 | 0 | 0 | — | | 1 (Note: Appearance in Dockerty Cup) | 0 | 17 | 14 |
| Grimsby Borough | 2024–25 | NPL East Division | 27 | 6 | 0 | 0 | — | | 1 (Note: Appearance in Lincolnshire Senior Cup) | 0 | 28 | 6 |
| Lincoln United | 2025–26 | NPL East Division | 9 | 0 | 2 | 0 | — | | 0 | 0 | 11 | 0 |
| Newton Aycliffe | 2025–26 | NPL East Division | 10 | 4 | 0 | 0 | — | | 0 | 0 | 10 | 4 |
| Hallam | 2025–26 | NPL East Division | 10 | 0 | 0 | 0 | — | | 0 | 0 | 10 | 0 |
| Career total | | | 261 | 68 | 11 | 3 | 2 | 0 | 13 | 3 | 287 | 74 |

== Honours ==
York City

- FA Trophy: 2016–17
