= Michael Duckworth =

English footballer (born 1992)

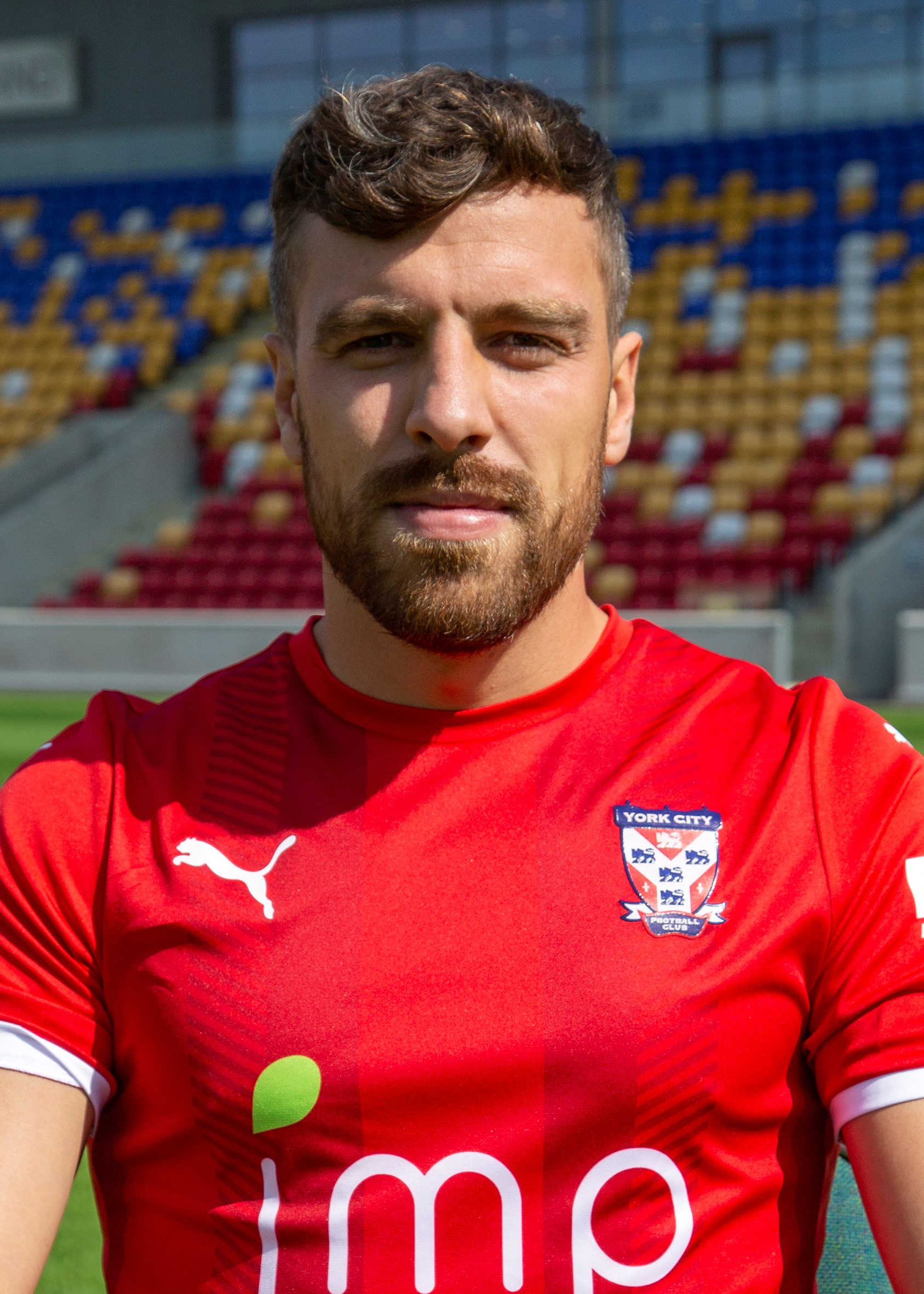
- Duckworth with York City in 2021

Personal information
- Full name: Michael James Duckworth
- Date of birth: 28 April 1992 (age 34)
- Place of birth: Rinteln, Germany
- Height: 5 ft 11 in (1.81 m)
- Position: Right-back

Team information
- Current team: Scarborough Athletic
- Number: 4

Youth career
- –2010: York City

Senior career*
Years	Team	Apps	(Gls)
2010–2011	Harrogate Railway Athletic		
2011–2013	Bradford Park Avenue	38	(3)
2013–2016	Hartlepool United	80	(3)
2016–2017	Fleetwood Town	4	(0)
2017	→ Morecambe (loan)	14	(0)
2017–2020	FC Halifax Town	67	(3)
2020–2024	York City	54	(3)
2024–	Scarborough Athletic	49	(0)
- * Club domestic league appearances and goals as of 22:20, 19 May 2026 (UTC)

Michael James Duckworth (born 28 April 1992) is an English professional footballer who plays as a right-back for Scarborough Athletic.

He has played in the English Football League for Hartlepool United, Fleetwood Town and Morecambe.

== Early life and career ==
=== Early career ===
Duckworth was born in Rinteln, Lower Saxony, Germany and lived there for six months before being raised in Rawcliffe, York, England. He started playing for his local team in Rawcliffe aged five, before joining York City's youth team aged 10. Duckworth signed a two-year scholarship with York in May 2008 after graduating from the club's Centre of Excellence. However, he was released after failing to earn a professional contract in May 2010.

Duckworth moved into non-League football in October 2010 when signing for Harrogate Railway Athletic of the Northern Premier League Division One North. He signed for Bradford Park Avenue in August 2011 and made 24 appearances, scoring 6 goals, in the 2011–12 season as they won promotion to the Conference North via the Northern Premier League Premier Division play-offs. He made 43 appearances in 2012–13 and won the club's Supporters' Player of the Year and Players' Player of the Year awards.

=== Football League ===
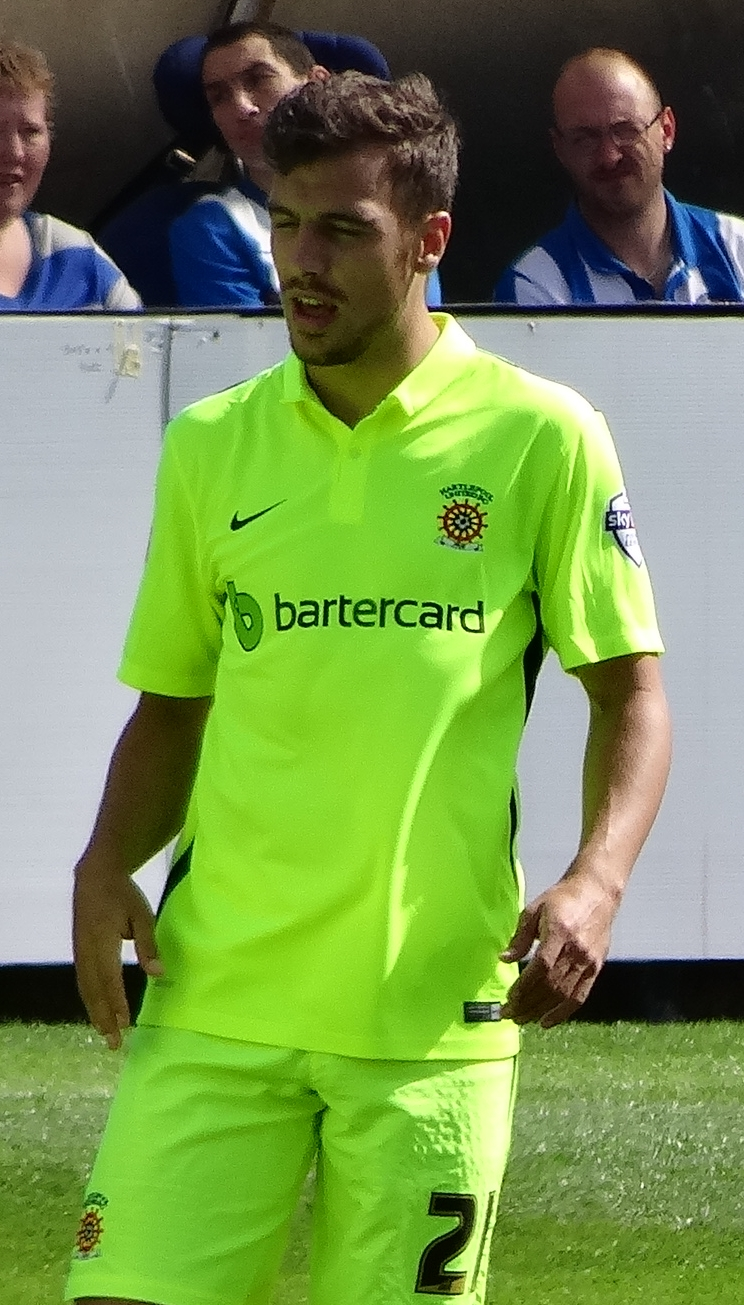
Duckworth playing for Hartlepool United in 2015

Duckworth went on trial at League Two club Hartlepool United in July 2013 after being recommended to them by Bradford Park Avenue manager John Deacey. His trial was a success and he signed a month-to-month contract with Hartlepool on 22 August 2013. He made his professional debut two days later after playing the full 90 minutes in a 1–0 home defeat against Fleetwood Town. In September 2013, Duckworth was rewarded for his early season form by signing a new contract for a longer period to extend his stay at Victoria Park. On 30 July 2014, Duckworth signed a new deal with the club on undisclosed terms. His goal in a 3–3 away draw against Carlisle United was nominated for the Football League Goal of the Year and was later voted as the tenth best Football League goal of the 2010s.

Duckworth signed for League One club Fleetwood Town on 17 June 2016. On 31 January 2017, he joined League Two club Morecambe on loan until the end of 2016–17.

=== Return to non-League ===
Duckworth signed for newly promoted National League club FC Halifax Town on 5 August 2017 on a one-year contract.

Duckworth re-signed for York City, with the club now in the National League North, on 13 August 2020. In York City's retained list at the end of the 2023–24 season, it was announced that Duckworth would depart the club at the end of his contract. On 16 May 2024, it was announced that Duckworth would sign for National League North club Scarborough Athletic once his contract with York expired.

== Style of play ==
Having joined Bradford Park Avenue as a winger or a forward, he was converted by manager John Deacey into playing as an attacking right-back.

== Career statistics ==
As of 11 April 2026

Appearances and goals by club, season and competition
Club	Season	League			FA Cup		League Cup		Other		Total	
Club	Season	Division	Apps	Goals	Apps	Goals	Apps	Goals	Apps	Goals	Apps	Goals
Bradford Park Avenue	2012–13	Conference North	38	3	4	0	—		1 (Note: Appearance(s) in FA Trophy)	0	43	3
Hartlepool United	2013–14	League Two	30	0	3	0	0	0	3 (Note: Appearance(s) in Football League Trophy)	0	36	0
Hartlepool United	2014–15	League Two	37	3	1	0	1	0	1	1	40	4
Hartlepool United	2015–16	League Two	13	0	2	0	2	0	1	0	18	0
Hartlepool United	Total		80	3	6	0	3	0	5	1	94	4
Fleetwood Town	2016–17	League One	4	0	0	0	0	0	2 (Note: Appearances in EFL Trophy)	0	6	0
Morecambe (loan)	2016–17	League Two	14	0	—		—		—		14	0
FC Halifax Town	2017–18	National League	18	0	0	0	—		0	0	18	0
FC Halifax Town	2018–19	National League	19	0	1	0	—		2	0	22	0
FC Halifax Town	2019–20	National League	30	3	1	0	—		4 (Note: Three appearances in FA Trophy, one in National League play-offs)	0	35	3
FC Halifax Town	Total		67	3	2	0	—		6	0	75	3
York City	2020–21	National League North	4	0	2	0	—		0	0	6	0
York City	2021–22	National League North	20	1	4	0	—		4	0	28	1
York City	2022–23	National League	18	2	1	0	—		0	0	19	2
York City	2023–24	National League	6	0	0	0	—		1	0	7	0
York City	Total		48	3	7	0	—		5	0	60	3
Scarborough Athletic	2024–25	National League North	19	0	0	0	—		1	0	20	0
Scarborough Athletic	2025–26	National League North	30	0	1	0	—		1	0	32	0
Scarborough Athletic	Total		49	0	1	0	—		2	0	52	0
Career total			300	12	20	0	3	0	21	1	344	13

== Honours ==
Individual

- Bradford Park Avenue Supporters' Player of the Year: 2012–13
- Bradford Park Avenue Players' Player of the Year: 2012–13
