= Josh Nearney =

English footballer

Personal information
- Full name: Joshua William Nearney
- Date of birth: 7 September 1995 (age 31)
- Place of birth: Newcastle upon Tyne, England
- Height: 6 ft 0 in (1.83 m)
- Position: Defender

Senior career*
| Years | Team | Apps | (Gls) |
| 2014–2017 | Hartlepool United | 0 | (0) |
| 2014 | → Darlington F.C. (loan) | 2 | (0) |
| 2015 | → Whitby Town (loan) | 5 | (0) |
| 2016 | → Whitley Bay (loan) | 6 | (0) |
| 2017–2018 | Whitley Bay | 33 | (1) |
| 2018–2019 | Whitby Town | | |
| 2019 | North Shields | | |
| 2019 | Blyth Spartans | 1 | (0) |
| Total | | 47 | (1) |
- * Club domestic league appearances and goals

Joshua William Nearney (born 7 September 1995) is a former English professional footballer who played as a defender.

Nearney began his career with Hartlepool United in EFL League Two but made only one appearance for the club in the Football League Trophy. He also played non-league football for Darlington F.C., Whitley Bay, North Shields and Whitby Town. His final club was Blyth Spartans who he played for once in the National League North before quitting football due to work commitments.

== Career ==
Born in Newcastle-upon-Tyne, Nearney played for the city's Wallsend Boys Club and the youth ranks of Middlesbrough before joining Hartlepool F.C.at under-16 level, where he signed his first professional contract on 16 June 2014. He was an unused substitute for the team in three matches during the 2014–15 Football League Two season, starting with their 1–2 home loss to Luton Town on 18 October 2014. Nearney made his professional debut in the Football League Trophy first round on 1 September 2015 as a 66th-minute substitute for Michael Duckworth; Hartlepool drew 1–1 with Sheffield United at Victoria Park and lost in a penalty shootout. On 23 October, Nearney joined Northern Premier League Premier Division side Whitby Town on a one-month loan deal.

Nearney left Hartlepool in August 2017 to sign permanently for Whitley Bay. He made 33 league appearances for the Northern League side during the 2017–18 season, scoring once.

One month after submitting a transfer request in July 2018, Nearney signed for Northern Premier League side Whitby Town.

In June 2019, Nearney joined National League North side Blyth Spartans. He featured for the Spartans throughout pre-season but made only league appearance for the club in a 3–0 home defeat against York City on 13 August 2019. However, two days after making his debut, he left the club by mutual consent due to a change in work commitments. Blyth manager Lee Clark said of the decision: "Josh worked extremely hard at university to get his degree. He has found himself a job curtails his career and he has decided to go down that route. We wish him nothing but the best and good luck for the future."

== Career statistics ==
As of 23 October 2015.

| Club | Season | League | | | National Cup | | League Cup | | Other | | Total | |
| Club | Season | Division | Apps | Goals | Apps | Goals | Apps | Goals | Apps | Goals | Apps | Goals |
|---|---|---|---|---|---|---|---|---|---|---|---|---|
| Hartlepool United | 2014–15 | League Two | 0 | 0 | 0 | 0 | 0 | 0 | 0 | 0 | 0 | 0 |
| Hartlepool United | 2015–16 | League Two | 0 | 0 | 0 | 0 | 0 | 0 | 1 | 0 | 1 | 0 |
| Total | | | 0 | 0 | 0 | 0 | 0 | 0 | 1 | 0 | 1 | 0 |
| Whitby Town (loan) | 2015–16 | NPL Premier Division | 0 | 0 | 0 | 0 | – | | 0 | 0 | 0 | 0 |
| Total | | | 0 | 0 | 0 | 0 | – | | 0 | 0 | 0 | 0 |
| Career total | | | 0 | 0 | 0 | 0 | 0 | 0 | 1 | 0 | 1 | 0 |
