= Connor Smith (footballer, born 1996) =

English footballer (born 1996)

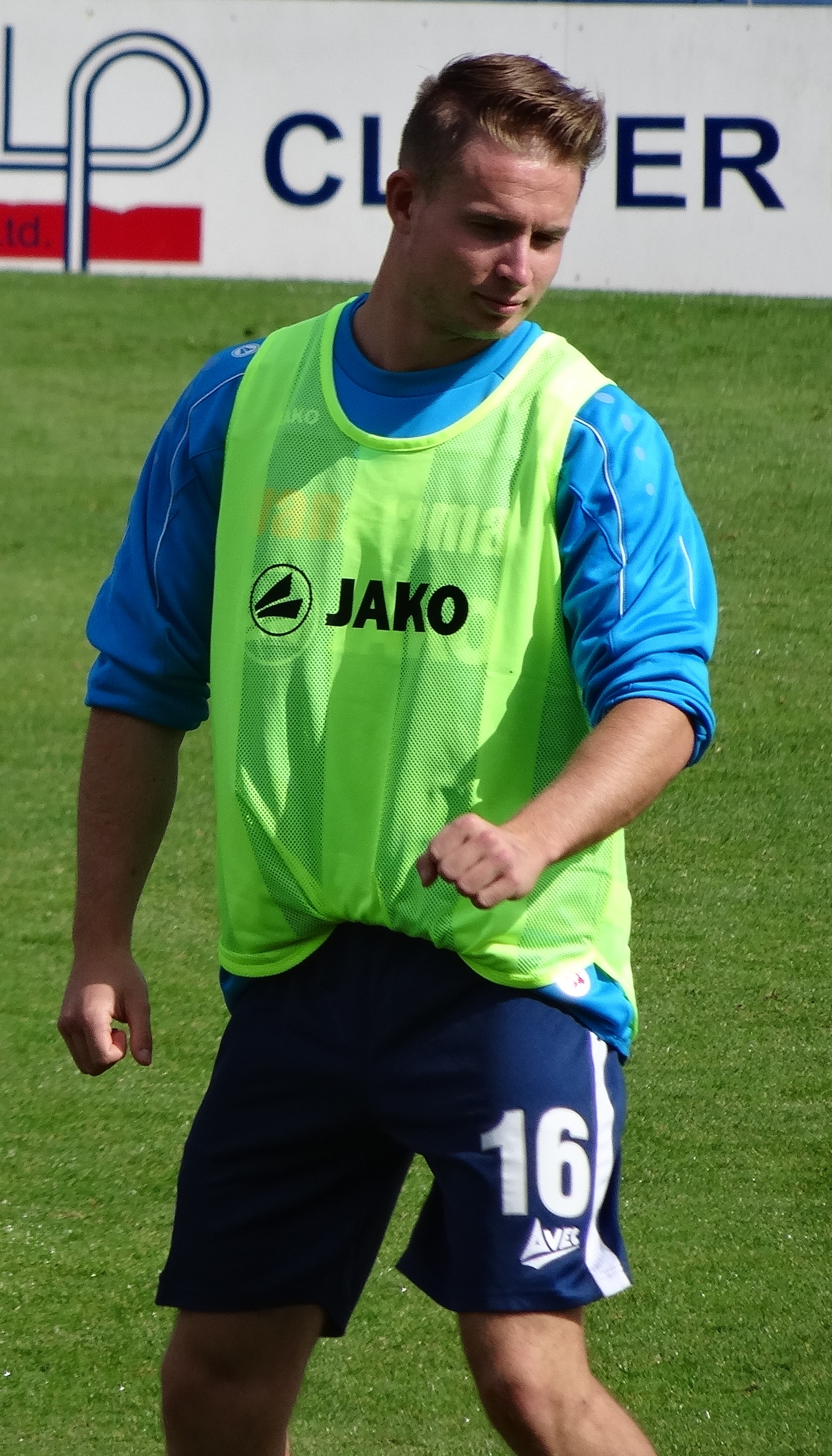
- Smith warming up for York City in 2017

Personal information
- Full name: Connor Charles Smith
- Date of birth: 14 October 1996 (age 30)
- Place of birth: Stockton-on-Tees, England
- Height: 6 ft 1 in (1.85 m)
- Position: Winger

Team information
- Current team: Whitby Town

Youth career
- –2014: Hartlepool United

Senior career*
Years	Team	Apps	(Gls)
2014–2017	Hartlepool United	15	(0)
2016	→ Whitby Town (loan)	5	(0)
2017	→ Spennymoor Town (loan)		
2017–2018	York City	22	(1)
2017	→ Whitby Town (loan)		
2018–2019	Frickley Athletic	13	(0)
2020–2023	Marske United	77	(3)
2023–	Whitby Town	98	(4)
- * Club domestic league appearances and goals as of 23:00, 18 May 2026 (UTC)

Connor Charles Smith (born 14 October 1996) is an English semi-professional footballer who plays as a winger for Whitby Town. He has played for Hartlepool United, Spennymoor Town, York City and Marske United.

== Early life ==
Smith was born in Stockton-on-Tees, County Durham.

== Career ==
=== Hartlepool United ===
Smith joined the youth system of Hartlepool United at under-12 level. He started a two-year scholarship with the club in the summer of 2013. In May 2014, Smith was promoted to the first team for the final match of the 2013–14 season after impressing in his first year as a scholar. He came on as a substitute for Jonathan Franks in the second half of the 2–0 defeat to Exeter City.

On 15 November 2016, Smith joined Northern Premier League Premier Division club Whitby Town on a one-month loan. He made his debut when starting Whitby's 3–2 home defeat to Goole in the Northern Premier League Challenge Cup, in which he was substituted on 59 minutes. He finished the loan with seven appearances. On 23 March 2017, Smith joined Northern Premier League Premier Division club Spennymoor Town on loan until the end of 2016–17. He made his debut two days later as a substitute in a 1–1 draw at home to Halesowen Town.

=== Non-League ===
Smith signed for newly relegated National League North club York City on 27 June 2017 on a one-year contract. He joined Northern Premier League Premier Division club Whitby Town on 26 October 2017 on a one-month loan, making his debut two days later as a substitute in a 3–1 home defeat to Marine in the FA Trophy first qualifying round. Smith made 23 appearances and scored one goal as York ranked 11th place in the table in 2017–18. He was released at the end of the season.

Smith signed for Northern Premier League Division One East club Frickley Athletic on 26 May 2018.

On 21 February 2020, Smith joined Marske United. He left Marske in November 2023 to sign for Whitby Town. He was released by Whitby at the end of the 2025–26 season.

== Career statistics ==
As of match played 26 January 2019

Appearances and goals by club, season and competition
Club	Season	League			FA Cup		League Cup		Other		Total	
Club	Season	Division	Apps	Goals	Apps	Goals	Apps	Goals	Apps	Goals	Apps	Goals
Hartlepool United	2013–14	League Two	1	0	0	0	0	0	0	0	1	0
Hartlepool United	2014–15	League Two	8	0	0	0	0	0	1 (Note: Appearance in Football League Trophy)	0	9	0
Hartlepool United	2015–16	League Two	5	0	1	0	1	0	0	0	7	0
Hartlepool United	2016–17	League Two	1	0	0	0	0	0	1 (Note: Appearance in EFL Trophy)	0	2	0
Hartlepool United	Total		15	0	1	0	1	0	2	0	19	0
Whitby Town (loan)	2016–17	Northern Premier League; Premier Division	5	0	—		—		2 (Note: One appearance in Northern Premier League Challenge Cup, one in North Riding Senior Cup)	0	7	0
York City	2017–18	National League North	22	1	1	0	—		—		23	1
Frickley Athletic	2018–19	Northern Premier League; Division One East	13	0	3	0	—		1	0	17	0
Career total			55	1	5	0	1	0	5	0	66	1
