= Ebby Nelson-Addy =

English footballer

Personal information
- Full name: Ebenezer Godfried Nelson-Addy
- Date of birth: 13 September 1992 (age 34)
- Place of birth: Milton Keynes, England
- Position: Winger

Team information
- Current team: Bedford Town

Youth career
- 2000–2012: Aston Villa

Senior career*
Years	Team	Apps	(Gls)
2012–2013	Loughborough University		
2013	Brackley Town	1	(0)
2013–2014	Worcester City	33	(2)
2014–2015	Brackley Town	25	(2)
2015–2016	Hartlepool United	4	(0)
2015–2016	→ Worcester City (loan)	5	(1)
2016–2017	Worcester City	19	(3)
2017	→ Barton Rovers (loan)		
2017–2018	Hemel Hempstead Town	7	(1)
2018	Cambridge City	9	(5)
2018–	Bedford Town		
- * Club domestic league appearances and goals as of 19:30, 3 December 2019 (UTC)

Ebenezer Godfried Nelson-Addy (born 13 September 1992) is an English footballer who plays for National League North side Bedford Town, where he plays as a midfielder. He is a product of the Aston Villa Academy.

== Career ==
=== Youth career ===
Nelson-Addy started his career at Aston Villa at the age of eight, ultimately being released in the summer of 2012 after twelve years. He was part of the Villa academy side that lost the 2010 FA Youth Cup final 3–2 on aggregate to Chelsea, playing 90 minutes at right midfield for both legs. He also played for Aston Villa Reserves as they won the FA Premier Reserve League South and finished runners-up in the League final.

=== Non-league ===
Nelson-Addy joined Conference North side Brackley Town in March 2013 following his release from Aston Villa at the end of the previous season. He only managed one senior appearance that season before moving to Worcester City in the same league where he established himself in the first team. Nelson-Addy then moved back to Brackley Town for the following season, becoming a first-team regular, before transferring to Hartlepool United in March 2015.

=== Hartlepool United ===
Nelson-Addy joined Hartlepool United in March 2015 and made his League Two debut as a substitute in a 3–0 loss to Luton Town on 18 April 2015.

=== Bedford Town ===
On 3 November 2019, Nelson-Addy joined Bedford Town from Cambridge City, on 3 August 2019, Ebby resigned for Bedford Town in preparation for the 2019–20 season.
