= Michael Woods (footballer, born 1990) =

English footballer (born 1990)

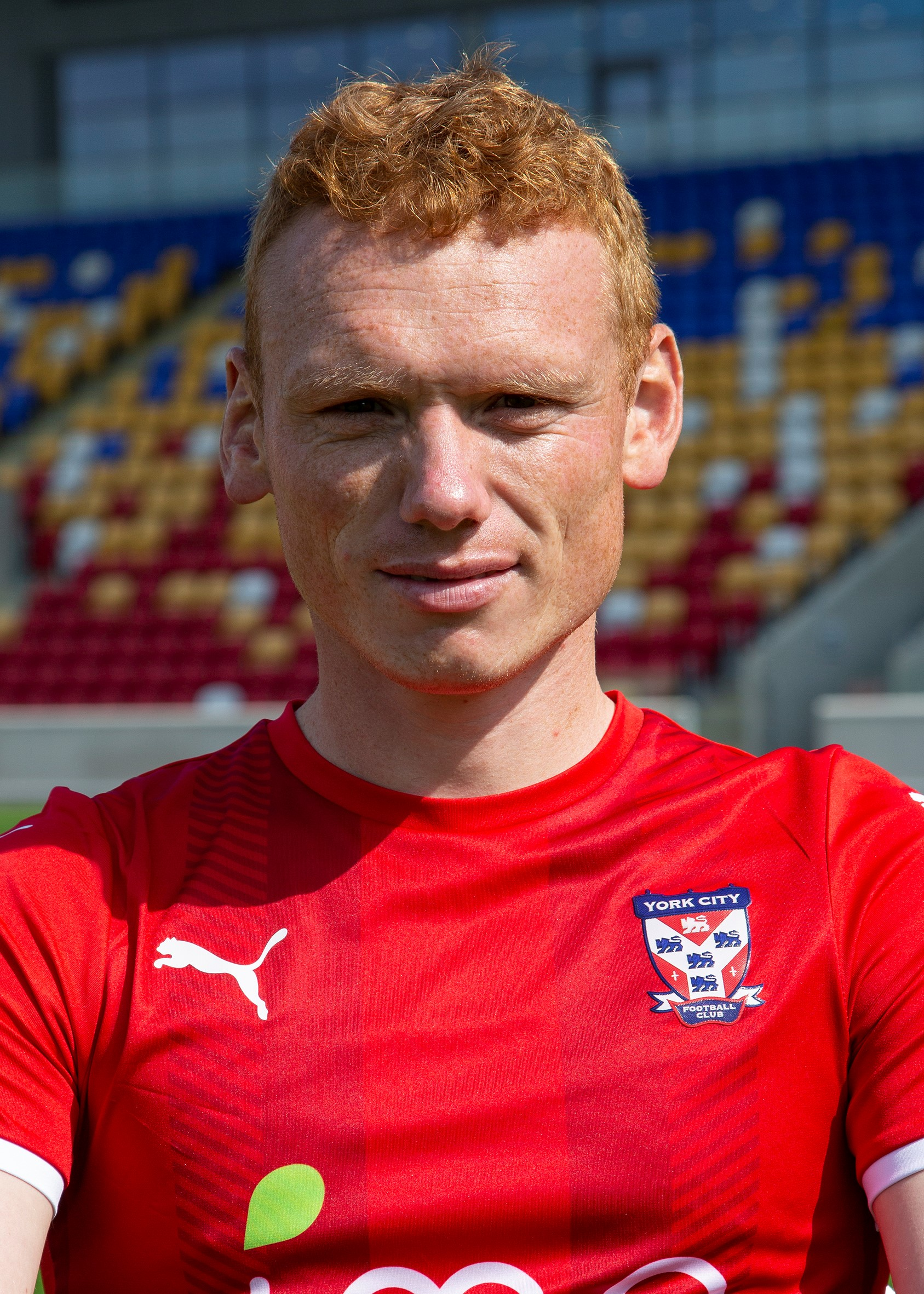
- Woods with York City in 2021

Personal information
- Full name: Michael James Woods
- Date of birth: 6 April 1990 (age 36)
- Place of birth: York, England
- Height: 5 ft 8 in (1.73 m)
- Position: Central midfielder

Team information
- Current team: Morpeth Town

Youth career
- 2004–2006: Leeds United
- 2006–2007: Chelsea

Senior career*
Years	Team	Apps	(Gls)
2007–2011	Chelsea	0	(0)
2010–2011	→ Notts County (loan)	0	(0)
2012	Yeovil Town	5	(1)
2012–2013	Doncaster Rovers	1	(0)
2013–2014	Harrogate Town	37	(9)
2014–2018	Hartlepool United	144	(18)
2018–2019	Harrogate Town	16	(2)
2019–2020	Dover Athletic	33	(3)
2020–2022	York City	29	(8)
2022–2024	South Shields	50	(11)
2024	Blyth Spartans	14	(1)
2024–2025	Scarborough Athletic	8	(0)
2025–2026	Whitby Town	22	(4)
2026–	Morpeth Town	8	(0)

International career
2005–2006	England U16	8	(5)
2006–2007	England U17	15	(8)
2008	England U19	4	(2)
- * Club domestic league appearances and goals as of 23:44, 17 May 2026 (UTC)

Michael James Woods (born 6 April 1990) is an English professional footballer who plays as a midfielder for Morpeth Town.

He started his career at Chelsea, and has since played for Harrogate Town, Hartlepool United, Dover Athletic and York City.

== Club career ==
=== Chelsea ===
Born in York, Woods turned down a scholarship from Leeds United to sign for Chelsea. Leeds United chairman Ken Bates accused Chelsea of tapping-up the sixteen-year-old as well as two other academy players. Eventually the two clubs later agreed an out-of-court settlement, with Chelsea paying £5 million in compensation for Woods and Tom Taiwo.

After spending time in the reserves, Woods made his first-team debut for Chelsea at Stamford Bridge against Macclesfield Town in the third round of the FA Cup on 6 January 2007, making him the fourth-youngest player to ever play for Chelsea at 16 years and 275 days old. He made two appearances for Chelsea in the FA Cup, making his debut as a substitute for Ashley Cole against Macclesfield Town and in the next round coming on for Frank Lampard against Nottingham Forest, but did not play in the Premier League. Although his progress was interrupted by a series of injuries, he was ever-present in the reserves. Woods was released by Chelsea at the end of the 2010–11 season.

On 1 November 2010, Woods joined Notts County on loan until January. He made his debut in the second round of the FA Cup, in County's 3–1 win over AFC Bournemouth.

=== Yeovil Town ===
Woods went on a trial spell with Aberdeen in July 2011. On 23 February 2012, following a short trial period Woods signed for Yeovil Town on non-contract terms, with Gary Johnson stating that he was very impressed with his attitude.

On 29 February 2012, Woods played his first match in Yeovil's Somerset Premier Cup defeat by Clevedon and his performance was impressed by Johnson as Woods looks to win a first-team place. On 24 March 2012, Woods made his debut for Yeovil Town after coming on in the 74th minute for Dominic Blizzard in a 1–0 loss against Hartlepool United on 24 March 2012. After a handful of encouraging substitute appearances, including scoring his first professional goal in a 3–1 win over Rochdale on 7 April 2012, he forced his way into the Yeovil starting XI but was sent off in only his second start against Stevenage.

Despite initially impressing Gary Johnson his contract was not renewed at the end of the season.

=== Doncaster Rovers ===
On 5 October 2012, Woods joined Doncaster Rovers of League One on non-contract terms and was given number eleven shirt. Woods made his debut on 17 November 2012 against Portsmouth, winning the game 1–0. After making one appearance, it announced on 27 December 2012 that Woods would not have his contract renewed.

=== Harrogate Town ===
Following his release from Doncaster, Woods joined Conference North side Harrogate Town on 2 February 2013 on a free transfer. He scored on his debut in Harrogate Town's 2–1 loss against Brackley Town. Woods had an impressive spell at Harrogate Town, making 35 appearances and scoring nine times.

=== Hartlepool United ===
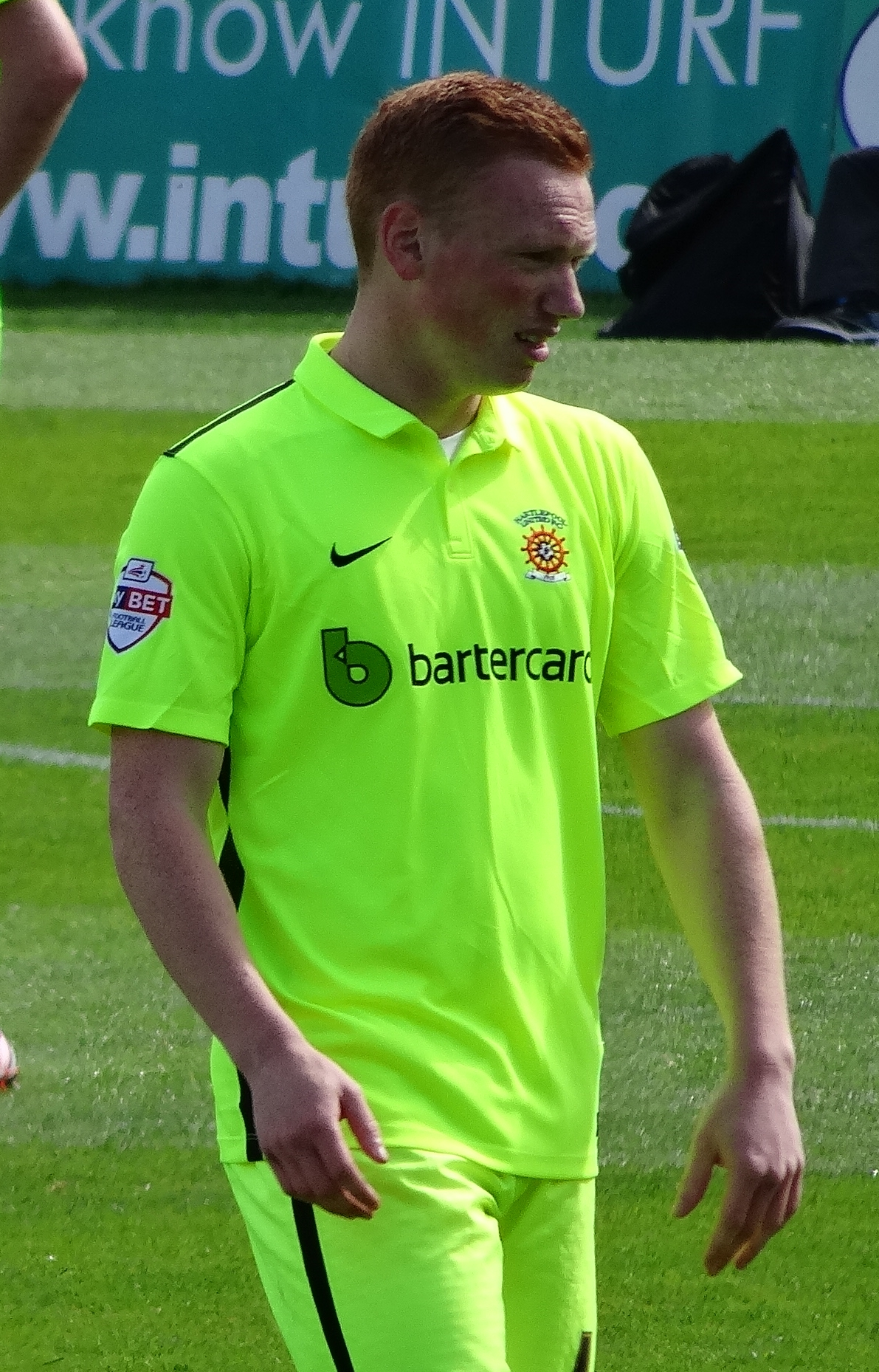
Woods playing for Hartlepool United in 2015

After a spell in non-league football, Woods signed for Hartlepool United on 8 August 2014 following a successful trial. He stated that joining Hartlepool United gave him a second chance in professional football. Woods made his Hartlepool United league debut on 19 August 2014, just days after appearing in Hartlepool's EFL Cup defeat away to Port Vale. He scored his first goal for the club, where he "acrobatically volleyed the ball", as Hartlepool United beat Exeter City 2–1 on 11 October 2014.

In March 2015, it was announced that Woods would miss at least the remainder of the season due to him dislocating his ankle and fracturing the fibula. Pools boss Ronnie Moore told the press "He's been our best player to be fair and I'm gutted for him". He returned to the Hartlepool side five months later.

=== Second spell at Harrogate ===
On 19 November 2018, Woods rejoined Harrogate Town.

=== Dover Athletic ===
On 31 May 2019, Woods agreed to sign for Dover Athletic on a two-year deal from 1 July 2019. Woods' contract was terminated by mutual consent on 7 September 2020.

=== York City ===
On 7 September 2020, Woods signed for his hometown club York City after leaving Dover. Woods' contract expired at the end of the 2021–22 season, following York's promotion back to the National League.

=== South Shields ===
On 1 June 2022, Woods signed for South Shields. Woods made an immediate impact at Shields, scoring consecutively in his first three games. In April 2023, it was announced that Woods was to miss the rest of the 2022–23 season due to a knee injury.

=== Blyth Spartans ===
On 13 June 2024, it was announced that he had signed for Northern Premier League Premier Division club Blyth Spartans. He departed the club in December 2024.

=== Scarborough Athletic ===
On 10 December 2024, Woods joined National League North side Scarborough Athletic.

=== Whitby Town ===
On 14 February 2025, Woods signed for Northern Premier League Premier Division side Whitby Town. He left the club by mutual consent in March 2026.

=== Morpeth Town ===
In March 2026, following his departure from Whitby, Woods signed for fellow Northern Premier League side Morpeth Town.

== International career ==
Woods has been capped several times for the English national under-17 team. He is an England Under-18 international and played in the 2007 FIFA U-17 World Cup. In the summer of 2009, he was called up for the 2009 FIFA U-20 World Cup in Egypt.

== Personal life ==
He is the nephew of Neil Woods and his grandfather is former footballer Alan Woods.

== Career statistics ==
As of end of the 2025-26 season

Appearances and goals by club, season and competition
Club	Season	League			FA Cup		League Cup		Other		Total	
Club	Season	Division	Apps	Goals	Apps	Goals	Apps	Goals	Apps	Goals	Apps	Goals
Chelsea	2006–07	Premier League	0	0	2	0	0	0	0	0	2	0
Notts County (loan)	2010–11	League One	0	0	2	0	0	0	0	0	2	0
Yeovil Town	2011–12	League One	5	1	0	0	0	0	0	0	5	1
Doncaster Rovers	2012–13	League One	1	0	2	0	0	0	0	0	3	0
Harrogate Town	2012–13	Conference North	15	3	0	0	—		0	0	15	3
Harrogate Town	2013–14	Conference North	22	6	0	0	—		0	0	22	6
Harrogate Town	Total		37	9	0	0	—		0	0	37	9
Hartlepool United	2014–15	League Two	23	1	2	0	1	0	1 (Note: Appearance(s) in Football League Trophy)	0	27	1
Hartlepool United	2015–16	League Two	33	3	2	0	2	0	0	0	37	3
Hartlepool United	2016–17	League Two	36	2	2	0	1	0	1 (Note: Appearance(s) in EFL Trophy)	0	40	2
Hartlepool United	2017–18	National League	39	8	2	0	—		1 (Note: Appearance(s) in FA Trophy)	0	42	8
Hartlepool United	2018–19	National League	12	1	1	0	—		0	0	13	1
Hartlepool United	Total		143	16	9	0	4	0	3	0	159	15
Harrogate Town	2018–19	National League	16	2	0	0	—		2	0	18	2
Dover Athletic	2019–20	National League	33	3	2	0	—		1	0	36	3
York City	2020–21	National League North	12	4	0	0	—		1	1	13	5
York City	2021–22	National League North	17	4	2	0	—		1	0	20	4
York City	Total		29	8	2	0	—		2	1	33	9
South Shields	2022–23	NPL Premier Division	23	6	3	2	0	0	0	0	26	8
South Shields	2023–24	National League North	27	5	1	0	—		1	0	29	5
South Shields	Total		50	11	4	2	—		1	0	55	13
Blyth Spartans	2024–25	NPL Premier Division	14	1	1	0	—		0	0	15	1
Scarborough Athletic	2024–25	National League North	8	0	0	0	—		0	0	8	0
Whitby Town	2024–25	NPL Premier Division	7	2	0	0	—		0	0	7	2
Whitby Town	2025–26	NPL Premier Division	15	2	1	0	0	0	1	0	17	2
Whitby Town	Total		22	4	1	0	0	0	1	0	24	4
Morpeth Town	2025–26	NPL Premier Division	8	0	0	0	0	0	0	0	8	0
Career total			365	54	25	2	4	0	10	1	405	57

== Honours ==
South Shields

- Northern Premier League: 2022–23
