= Adam Bartlett =

English footballer (born 1986)

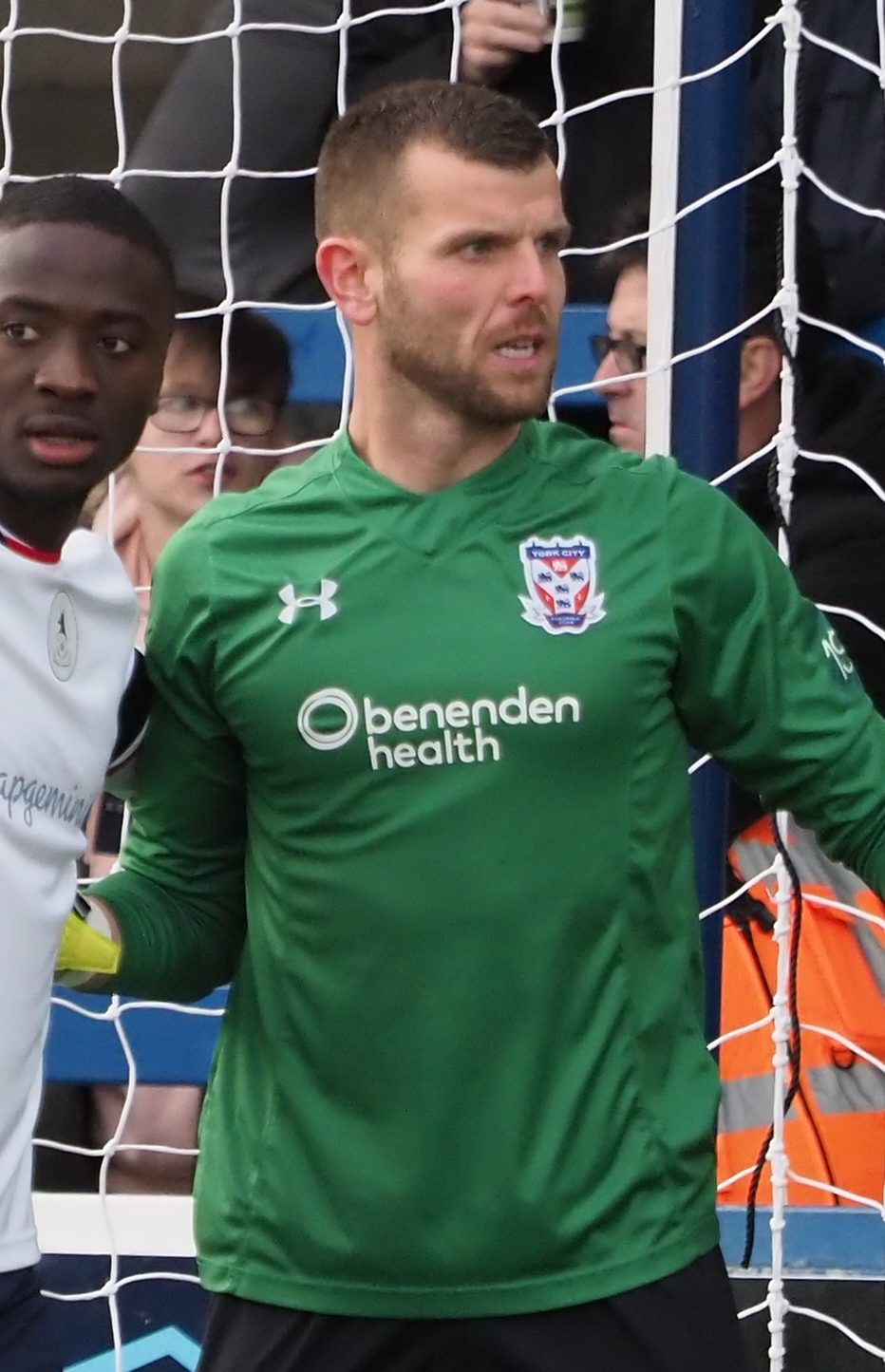
- Bartlett playing for York City in 2018

Personal information
- Full name: Adam James Bartlett
- Date of birth: 27 February 1986 (age 40)
- Place of birth: Newcastle upon Tyne, England
- Height: 6 ft 0 in (1.83 m)
- Position: Goalkeeper

Youth career
- –2005: Newcastle United

Senior career*
Years	Team	Apps	(Gls)
2005–2008	Blyth Spartans	82	(0)
2008–2009	Kidderminster Harriers	46	(0)
2009	→ Cambridge United (loan)	0	(0)
2009–2012	Hereford United	110	(0)
2012–2015	Gateshead	130	(0)
2015–2017	Hartlepool United	22	(0)
2017	Darlington	25	(0)
2017–2019	York City	62	(0)
2019–2020	Whickham	0	(0)
Total		477	(0)

International career
2007–2009	England C	6	(0)
- * Club domestic league appearances and goals as of 19:01, 10 May 2019 (UTC)

Adam James Bartlett (born 27 February 1986) is an English former footballer who played as a goalkeeper. Bartlett has played for Blyth Spartans, Kidderminster Harriers, Cambridge United, Hereford United, Gateshead, Hartlepool United, Darlington, York City and Whickham.

== Career ==
=== Early career ===
Bartlett was born in Newcastle upon Tyne, Tyne and Wear. He started his career at Newcastle United at the age of nine. Over the years, he progressed through to the reserve team, playing at every youth level. He trained with the senior team and was a standby for a UEFA Champions League match against Inter Milan in March 2003. He was also an Academy goalkeeping coach at the club. He was released, aged 19, in 2005.

Bartlett signed for Conference North club Blyth Spartans, playing the first game of his career at senior level against Wakefield & Emley on 10 September 2005. He played 14 games in his initial season, and followed this up with 47 in all competitions in 2006–07. He signed a new one-year contract in August 2007. He was named as Blyth's Player of the Season for the 2007–08 season. Bartlett's impressive performances at Blyth Spartans led to an England C call up and upon his departure from the club he was inducted into Blyth Spartans' Hall of Fame. During his final year at Blyth, he made six appearances for the England national C team.

=== Kidderminster Harriers and Hereford United ===
Bartlett signed for Conference Premier club Kidderminster Harriers on 27 May 2008 on a one-year contract. He was an ever-present in the 2008–09 Conference Premier. Bartlett joined Cambridge United on an emergency loan to play for them at Wembley Stadium in the 2009 Conference Premier play-off final, starting as Cambridge were beaten 2–0 by Torquay United. He was named as the Conference Premier Goalkeeper of the Year for 2008–09.

On 22 June 2009, Bartlett signed for League Two club Hereford United. He helped Hereford upset League One team Charlton Athletic in the League Cup first round on 11 August 2009, in which he saved a penalty from Charlton's Andy Gray in the 62nd minute. In March 2010, he extended his Hereford contract for a further year. Bartlett was Hereford's only ever-present player in 2009–10, and was named the club's Player of the Year. In May 2011, he signed a new two-year contract with the club.

=== Gateshead and Hartlepool United ===
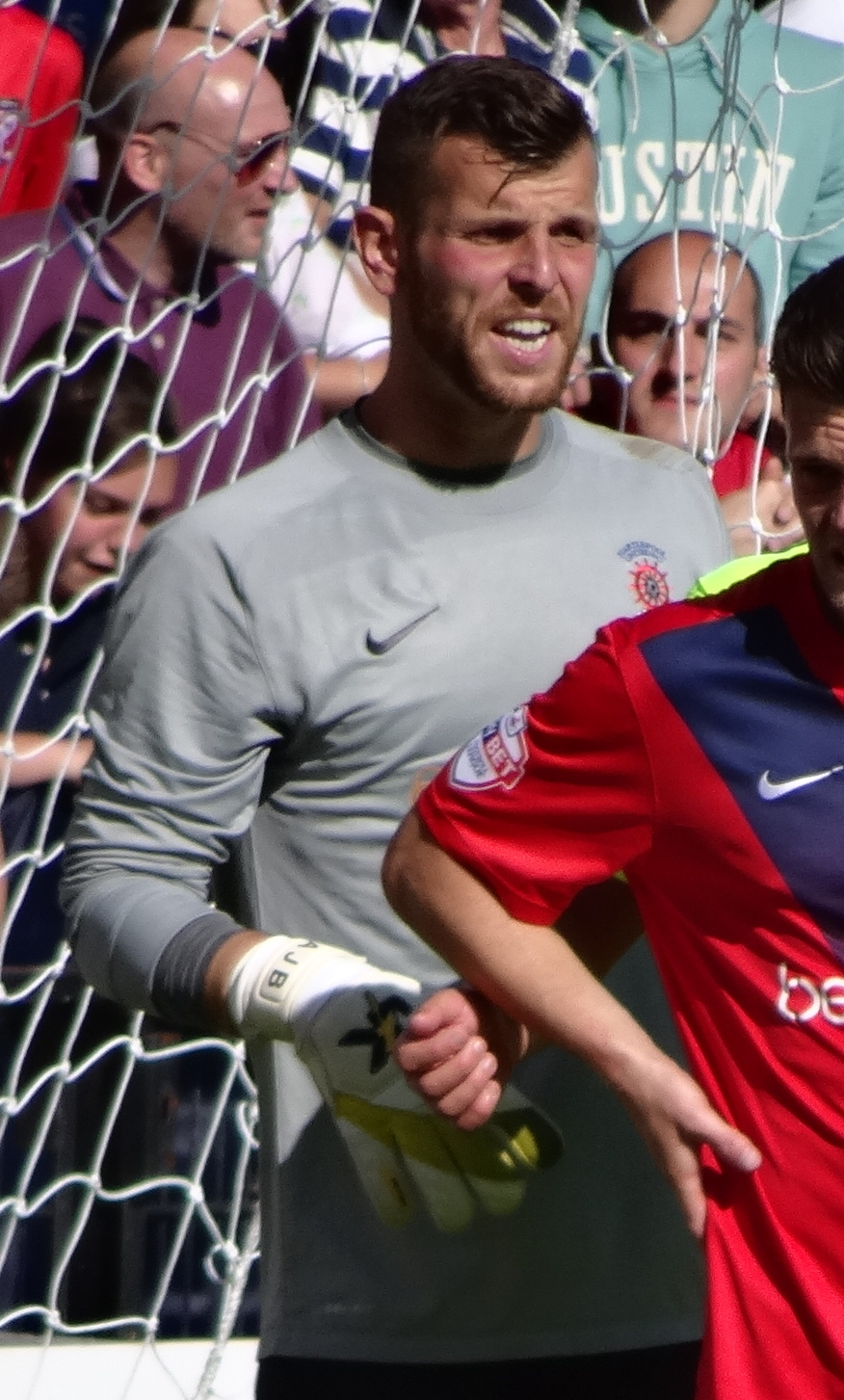
Bartlett playing for Hartlepool United in 2015

Bartlett signed for Conference Premier club Gateshead on 8 June 2012. He made his debut on 11 August 2012 in a 2–2 away draw with Luton Town. Bartlett started for Gateshead as they were beaten 2–1 at Wembley Stadium by Cambridge United in the 2014 Conference Premier play-off final. At the end of 2014–15, Bartlett was released by Gateshead.

Bartlett signed for League Two club Hartlepool United on 10 July 2015. He made his debut on 8 August 2015, keeping a clean sheet in a 2–0 home victory over Morecambe. Bartlett made 15 appearances for Hartlepool in 2015–16, keeping five clean sheets. Bartlett signed a new contract with the club in April 2016. He was often back-up to Trevor Carson but regained the number-one spot in 2016–17 when an injury ruled out Carson for the rest of the season. However, he later lost his place to Middlesbrough loanee Joe Fryer.

=== Darlington and York City ===
Bartlett had his Hartlepool contract cancelled by mutual consent on 21 March 2017 to take up a full-time role as an academy goalkeeping coach at Middlesbrough and moved into part-time football, signing for National League North club Darlington the following day. He made eight appearances for Darlington in 2016–17 as they finished fifth in the table. However, Darlington were denied entry to the play-offs because their Blackwell Meadows ground did not meet seating requirements.

In October 2017, Bartlett turned down the opportunity to sign for Darlington's National League North rivals York City, as he wanted to stay part-time. York had recently appointed Martin Gray as manager, who Bartlett played under at Darlington. He eventually signed for York on 7 November 2017 for an undisclosed fee on a contract until June 2019. He left York in May 2019 to pursue a career in sales with sporting goods manufacturers Core 37 and play part-time football for Whickham of the Northern League Division One.

== Coaching career ==
In August 2019, Bartlett began working as the goalkeeper coach for Newcastle's U23 side. He began working with the first team in January 2022, assisting head goalkeeper coach Simon Smith. On 21 October 2022, it was announced that Bartlett had been promoted to role of Newcastle's head goalkeeper coach.

Bartlett left Newcastle United in late August 2026 following Matthias Jaissle’s appointment as head coach.

== Career statistics ==
Appearances and goals by club, season and competition
Club	Season	League			FA Cup		League Cup		Other		Total	
Club	Season	Division	Apps	Goals	Apps	Goals	Apps	Goals	Apps	Goals	Apps	Goals
Blyth Spartans	2006–07	Conference North	40	0	3	0	—		2 (Note: Appearances in FA Trophy)	0	45	0
Blyth Spartans	2007–08	Conference North	42	0	2	0	—		5 (Note: One appearance in Conference League Cup, four in FA Trophy)	0	49	0
Blyth Spartans	Total		82	0	5	0	—		7	0	94	0
Kidderminster Harriers	2008–09	Conference Premier	46	0	3	0	—		5	0	54	0
Cambridge United (loan)	2008–09	Conference Premier	—		—		—		1 (Note: Appearance in Conference Premier play-offs)	0	1	0
Hereford United	2009–10	League Two	46	0	2	0	2	0	4 (Note: Appearance(s) in Football League Trophy)	0	54	0
Hereford United	2010–11	League Two	46	0	5	0	1	0	1	0	53	0
Hereford United	2011–12	League Two	18	0	0	0	1	0	1	0	20	0
Hereford United	Total		110	0	7	0	4	0	6	0	127	0
Gateshead	2012–13	Conference Premier	46	0	1	0	—		3	0	50	0
Gateshead	2013–14	Conference Premier	46	0	3	0	—		5 (Note: Two appearances in FA Trophy, three in Conference Premier play-offs)	0	54	0
Gateshead	2014–15	Conference Premier	38	0	4	0	—		5	0	47	0
Gateshead	Total		130	0	8	0	—		13	0	151	0
Hartlepool United	2015–16	League Two	12	0	0	0	2	0	1	0	15	0
Hartlepool United	2016–17	League Two	10	0	0	0	1	0	3 (Note: Appearances in EFL Trophy)	0	14	0
Hartlepool United	Total		22	0	0	0	3	0	4	0	29	0
Darlington	2016–17	National League North	8	0	—		—		—		8	0
Darlington	2017–18	National League North	17	0	1	0	—		—		18	0
Darlington	Total		25	0	1	0	—		—		26	0
York City	2017–18	National League North	25	0	—		—		2	0	27	0
York City	2018–19	National League North	37	0	4	0	—		2	0	43	0
York City	Total		62	0	4	0	—		4	0	70	0
Career total			477	0	28	0	7	0	40	0	552	0

== Honours ==
Individual

- Blyth Spartans Player of the Season: 2007–08
- Conference Premier Goalkeeper of the Year: 2008–09
- Hereford United Player of the Year: 2009–10
