= 2016–17 Hartlepool United F.C. season =

Hartlepool United
2016–17 season
- Owner: JPNG
- Chairman: Gary Coxall
- Manager: Craig Hignett (until 15 January); Dave Jones (from 18 January)
- Stadium: Victoria Park
- League Two: 23rd (relegated)
- FA Cup: Second round (eliminated by Port Vale)
- League Cup: First round (eliminated by Preston North End)
- League Trophy: Group Stage (4th)
- Top goalscorer: League: Pádraig Amond (14); All: Pádraig Amond (14)
- Highest home attendance: 6,799 (vs Doncaster Rovers)
- Lowest home attendance: 380 (vs Rochdale)
- Average home league attendance: 3,787
- Biggest win: 4–0 (vs. Crewe Alexandra)
- Biggest defeat: 5–0 (vs. Cambridge United)
Home colours	Away colours

The 2016–17 season is Hartlepool United's 108th year in existence and their fourth consecutive season in League Two. Along with competing in League Two, the club will also participate in the FA Cup, League Cup and League Trophy.

The season covers the period from 1 July 2016 to 30 June 2017.

== Players ==
As of End of Season.

=== First-team squad ===
Note: Flags indicate national team as defined under FIFA eligibility rules; some limited exceptions apply. Players may hold more than one non-FIFA nationality.

No.	Pos.	Nation	Player
1	GK	NIR	Trevor Carson
2	DF	NIR	Carl Magnay
4	MF	ENG	Nicky Featherstone
5	DF	ENG	Rob Jones
6	DF	ENG	Matthew Bates
7	MF	ENG	Nathan Thomas
8	DF	ENG	Brad Walker
9	FW	IRL	Pádraig Amond
10	FW	ENG	Billy Paynter
11	FW	ENG	Rhys Oates
14	MF	ENG	Michael Woods
15	FW	ENG	Lewis Alessandra
16	DF	ENG	Ben Pollock
17	MF	ENG	Nicky Deverdics
18	MF	ENG	Lewis Hawkins
19	MF	ENG	Jordan Richards

No.	Pos.	Nation	Player
20	FW	ENG	Jake Orrell
21	DF	ENG	Josh Nearney
23	MF	ENG	Connor Smith
24	MF	ENG	Kieran Green
26	DF	ENG	Scott Harrison
27	MF	ENG	Jack Blackford
28	FW	NIR	Louis Rooney
29	DF	ENG	James Martin
31	GK	ENG	Ben Dudzinski
32	FW	ENG	Connor Simpson
33	DF	NIR	Liam Donnelly
34	MF	ENG	Josh Hawkes
35	DF	ENG	Kenton Richardson
38	FW	ENG	Devante Rodney
41	GK	ENG	Ryan Catterick
42	GK	ENG	Joe Fryer

== Transfers ==
=== Transfers in ===
Date	Position	Player	From	Fee	Ref
12 May 2016	GK	Ben Dudzinski	Durham City	Free	
24 May 2016	DF	Ben Pollock	Newcastle United	Free	
24 May 2016	DF	James Martin	Queen of the South	Free	
6 June 2016	MF	Nicky Deverdics	Dover Athletic	Free	
7 June 2016	FW	Jake Orrell	Chesterfield	Free	
16 June 2016	DF	Aristote Nsiala	Grimsby Town	Free	
20 June 2016	FW	Pádraig Amond	Grimsby Town	Free	
29 June 2016	FW	Lewis Alessandra	Rochdale	Free	
19 August 2016	DF	Liam Donnelly	Fulham	Free	
20 October 2016	DF	Harly Wise	Queens Park Rangers	Free	
28 October 2016	DF	Isaac Assenso	Scunthorpe United	Free	
6 January 2017	FW	Devante Rodney	Sheffield Wednesday	Free	

=== Transfers out ===
Date	Position	Name	To	Fee	Ref
17 June 2016	DF	Michael Duckworth	Fleetwood Town	Free	
24 June 2016	DF	Dan Jones	Grimsby Town	Free	
4 July 2016	FW	Scott Fenwick	York City	Free	
1 August 2016	MF	Ebby Nelson-Addy	Worcester City	Free	
3 August 2016	GK	Peter Denton	Stamford	Free	
5 August 2016	DF	Harry Worley	Salford City	Free	
8 August 2016	MF	Kudus Oyenuga	Greenock Morton	Free	
22 August 2016	FW	Rakish Bingham	Hamilton Academical	Free	
1 January 2017	DF	Aristote Nsiala	Shrewsbury Town	Undisclosed	
12 January 2017	DF	Jake Carroll	Cambridge United	Undisclosed	
31 January 2017	MF	Josh Laurent	Wigan Athletic	Undisclosed	
14 March 2017	DF	Harly Wise	Dulwich Hamlet	Free	
20 March 2017	DF	Isaac Assenso	Ossett Town	Free	
21 March 2017	GK	Adam Bartlett	Darlington	Free	

=== Loans in ===
Date from	Position	Player	From	Date until	Ref
30 August 2016	FW	Bradley Fewster	Middlesbrough	10 November 2016	
30 August 2016	FW	Tom Heardman	Newcastle United	10 November 2016	
5 January 2017	DF	Sean Kavanagh	Fulham	End of Season	
26 January 2017	GK	Joe Fryer	Middlesbrough	End of Season	
31 January 2017	FW	Andrew Nelson	Sunderland	22 February 2017	
31 January 2017	FW	Louis Rooney	Plymouth Argyle	End of Season	

=== Loans out ===
Date from	Position	Player	To	Date until	Ref
2 September 2016	FW	Rhys Oates	Gateshead	30 September 2016	
28 October 2016	MF	Jack Blackford	Whitby Town	25 November 2016	
25 November 2016	GK	Ben Dudzinski	Darlington	23 December 2016	
4 February 2017	MF	Jack Blackford	Darlington	4 March 2017	
8 February 2017	MF	Nicky Deverdics	Dover Athletic	8 March 2017	
10 February 2017	DF	Jordan Richards	Alfreton Town	End of Season	

== Competitions ==
=== Pre-season friendlies ===
9 July 2016 Friendly	Billingham Town	0–4	Hartlepool United	Billingham
15:00		Report	Alessandra 18'; Paynter 22'; Dixon 25' (o.g.); Amond 60'	Stadium: Bedford Terrace

20 July 2016 Friendly	Hartlepool United	0–3	Sunderland	Hartlepool
19:30		Report	Defoe 7', 20'; Khazri 16'	Stadium: Victoria Park; Attendance: 6,021; Referee: Tony Harrington

23 July 2016 Friendly	Spennymoor Town	2–0	Hartlepool United	Spennymoor
19:00		Report		Stadium: The Brewery Field

23 July 2016 Friendly	Livingston	0–0	Hartlepool United	Livingston
15:00		Report		Stadium: Almondvale Stadium; Attendance: 313

26 July 2016 Friendly	Seaham Red Star	1–1	Hartlepool United	Seaham
19:30	Kerr 17'	Report	Harrison 75'	Stadium: Seaham Town Park

26 July 2016 Friendly	Guisborough Town	0–6	Hartlepool United	Guisborough
19:45		Report	Paynter 14'; Alessandra 16', 85', 86'; Amond 25'; Hawkins 57'	Stadium: King George V Ground

30 July 2016 Friendly	Hartlepool United	0–1	Scunthorpe United	Hartlepool
15:00		Report	Van Veen 9'	Stadium: Victoria Park; Attendance: 1,136

=== League Two ===
==== League table ====
Pos	Team	Pld	W	D	L	GF	GA	GD	Pts	Promotion, qualification or relegation
20	Yeovil Town	46	11	17	18	49	64	−15	50	
21	Cheltenham Town	46	12	14	20	49	69	−20	50	
22	Newport County	46	12	12	22	51	73	−22	48	
23	Hartlepool United (R)	46	11	13	22	54	75	−21	46	Relegation to the National League
24	Leyton Orient (R)	46	10	6	30	47	87	−40	36	Relegation to the National League

Updated to match(es) played on 6 May 2017. Source: BBC Sport
Rules for classification: 1) Points; 2) Goal difference; 3) Number of goals scored
(R) Relegated

==== Results summary ====
Overall								Home						Away					
Pld	W	D	L	GF	GA	GD	Pts	W	D	L	GF	GA	GD	W	D	L	GF	GA	GD
46	11	13	22	54	75	−21	46	7	8	8	28	29	−1	4	5	14	26	46	−20

==== Results by matchday ====
Round	1	2	3	4	5	6	7	8	9	10	11	12	13	14	15	16	17	18	19	20	21	22	23	24	25	26	27	28	29	30	31	32	33	34	35	36	37	38	39	40	41	42	43	44	45	46
Ground	H	A	A	H	H	A	A	H	A	H	A	H	A	H	A	H	A	H	A	H	A	H	H	A	H	A	H	A	H	A	A	H	A	H	H	A	A	H	A	H	A	H	A	H	A	H
Result	D	W	D	L	D	L	W	D	D	D	W	D	L	L	L	W	L	W	L	L	D	L	W	D	L	L	W	L	D	L	L	D	L	W	W	L	W	L	L	L	D	D	L	L	L	W
Position	14	6	7	13	15	19	14	17	15	15	13	13	14	17	20	15	18	13	18	19	18	20	18	18	19	19	18	18	18	19	19	22	22	22	21	22	20	20	21	22	22	22	22	23	23	23

Source: Statto.com
A = Away; H = Home; W = Win; D = Draw; L = Loss

==== Matches ====
On 22 June 2016, the fixtures for the forthcoming season were announced.

6 August 2016 1	Hartlepool United	1–1	Colchester United	Hartlepool
15:00	Paynter 27' (pen.)	Report	Eastman 4'	Stadium: Victoria Park; Attendance: 4,055; Referee: Paul Tierney

13 August 2016 2	Exeter City	1–2	Hartlepool United	Exeter
15:00	McAlinden 31'	Report	Woods 74'; Paynter 75'	Stadium: St James Park; Attendance: 3,322; Referee: Mark Heywood

16 August 2016 3	Crewe Alexandra	3–3	Hartlepool United	Crewe
19:45	Dagnall 31'; Kiwomya 45'; Cooper 56'	Report	Magnay 42', 76'; Amond 72'	Stadium: Gresty Road; Attendance: 3,482; Referee: Ben Toner

20 August 2016 4	Hartlepool United	1–2	Notts County	Hartlepool
15:00	Nsiala 8'	Report	Laing 65'; Stead 76'	Stadium: Victoria Park; Attendance: 3,708; Referee: Michael Salisbury

27 August 2016 5	Hartlepool United	2–2	Newport County	Hartlepool
15:00	Featherstone 2'; Amond 38'	Report	Rigg 4'; Parkin 27'	Stadium: Victoria Park; Attendance: 3,261; Referee: Andy Haines

3 September 2016 6	Stevenage	6–1	Hartlepool United	Stevenage
15:00	Pett 27'; Walker 44', 57'; Wells 53'; Tonge 69' (pen.); Godden 78'	Report	Thomas 4'	Stadium: Broadhall Way; Attendance: 2,401; Referee: John Busby

10 September 2016 7	Yeovil Town	1–2	Hartlepool United	Yeovil
15:00	Butcher 56'	Report	Thomas 67', 90'	Stadium: Huish Park; Attendance: 2,749; Referee: Charles Breakspear

17 September 2016 8	Hartlepool United	0–0	Mansfield Town	Hartlepool
15:00		Report		Stadium: Victoria Park; Attendance: 3,775; Referee: Darren Handley

24 September 2016 9	Plymouth Argyle	1–1	Hartlepool United	Plymouth
15:00	Jervis 84' (pen.)	Report	Thomas 21'	Stadium: Home Park; Attendance: 7,591; Referee: Gavin Ward

27 September 2016 10	Hartlepool United	1–1	Luton Town	Hartlepool
19:45	Thomas 45'	Report	Sheehan 78'	Stadium: Victoria Park; Attendance: 3,533; Referee: Sebastian Stockbridge

1 October 2016 11	Grimsby Town	0–3	Hartlepool United	Cleethorpes
15:00		Report	Amond 25', 36'; Thomas 60'	Stadium: Blundell Park; Attendance: 5,713; Referee: Chris Sarginson

8 October 2016 12	Hartlepool United	1–1	Crawley Town	Hartlepool
15:00	Alessandra 12'	Report	Collins 74' (pen.)	Stadium: Victoria Park; Attendance: 3,693; Referee: Robert Jones

15 October 2016 13	Carlisle United	3–2	Hartlepool United	Carlisle
15:00	Ibehre 20'; Grainger 68'; Raynes 79'	Report	Alessandra 66'; Amond 75'	Stadium: Brunton Park; Attendance: 7,333; Referee: Darren Bond

22 October 2016 14	Hartlepool United	1–3	Leyton Orient	Hartlepool
15:00	Laurent 45+1'	Report	Sandro Semedo 55'; Palmer 62', 71'	Stadium: Victoria Park; Attendance: 3,700; Referee: David Webb

29 October 2016 15	Barnet	3–2	Hartlepool United	London
15:00	Akinde 68' (pen.); Gambin 76'; Batt 79'	Report	Thomas 31'; Amond 53'	Stadium: The Hive Stadium; Attendance: 1,690; Referee: Nick Kinseley

12 November 2016 16	Hartlepool United	2–0	Cheltenham Town	Hartlepool
15:00	Alessandra 45+6'; Bates 79'	Report		Stadium: Victoria Park; Attendance: 3,316; Referee: Graham Salisbury

19 November 2016 17	Doncaster Rovers	2–1	Hartlepool United	Doncaster
15:00	Marquis 23'; Mandeville 90'	Report	Amond 42' (pen.)	Stadium: Keepmoat Stadium; Attendance: 5,009; Referee: Mark Haywood

22 November 2016 18	Hartlepool United	2–0	Accrington Stanley	Hartlepool
19:45	Deverdics 62'; Alessandra 90'	Report		Stadium: Victoria Park; Attendance: 2,514; Referee: Richard Clark

26 November 2016 19	Wycombe Wanderers	2–0	Hartlepool United	High Wycombe
15:00	Kashket 23'	Report		Stadium: Adams Park; Attendance: 3,288; Referee: James Adcock

10 December 2016 20	Hartlepool United	0–5	Cambridge United	Hartlepool
15:00		Report	Berry 62'; Dunne 51'; Legge 66'; Ikpeazu 70'; Clark 88'	Stadium: Victoria Park; Attendance: 3,261; Referee: Carl Boyeson

17 December 2016 21	Portsmouth	0–0	Hartlepool United	Portsmouth
15:00		Report		Stadium: Fratton Park; Attendance: 17,081; Referee: Graham Horwood

26 December 2016 22	Hartlepool United	0–1	Blackpool	Hartlepool
15:00			Cullen 64'	Stadium: Victoria Park; Attendance: 3,767; Referee: Geoff Eltringham

30 December 2016 23	Hartlepool United	3–2	Morecambe	Hartlepool
19:45	Amond 10'; Paynter 14' (pen.); Featherstone 24'	Report	Fleming 52'; Edwards 90'	Stadium: Victoria Park; Attendance: 2,996; Referee: Seb Stockbridge

2 January 2017 23	Accrington Stanley	2–2	Hartlepool United	Accrington
15:00	Kee 57' (pen.); Pearson 70'	Report	Amond 60'; Harrison 86'	Stadium: Crown Ground; Attendance: 1,590; Referee: Graham Salisbury

7 January 2017 25	Hartlepool United	0–1	Grimsby Town	Hartlepool
15:00		Report	Yussuf 34'	Stadium: Victoria Park; Attendance: 4,388; Referee: Darren Drysdale

14 January 2017 26	Crawley Town	1–0	Hartlepool United	Crawley
15:00	Collins 63'	Report		Stadium: Broadfield Stadium; Attendance: 4,266; Referee: Darren Handley

21 January 2017 27	Hartlepool United	2–0	Stevenage	Hartlepool
15:00	Featherstone 41'; Walker 45'	Report		Stadium: Victoria Park; Attendance: 3,363; Referee: David Webb

28 January 2017 28	Newport County	3–1	Hartlepool United	Newport
15:00	Bird 15'; Williams 56'; Butler 71'	Report	Amond 90'	Stadium: Rodney Parade; Attendance: 2,271; Referee: Kevin Johnson

4 February 2017 29	Hartlepool United	1–1	Yeovil Town	Hartlepool
15:00 GMT	Amond 64'	Report	Dolan 69' (pen.)	Stadium: Victoria Park; Attendance: 3,410; Referee: Michael Salisbury

11 February 2017 30	Mansfield Town	4–0	Hartlepool United	Mansfield
15:00	Whiteman 19', 76'; Rose 26'; MacDonald 71'	Report		Stadium: One Call Stadium; Attendance: 4,309; Referee: Robert Lewis

14 February 2017 31	Luton Town	3–0	Hartlepool United	Luton
19:45	Hylton 5'; Gambin 13'; Palmer 81'	Report		Stadium: Kenilworth Road; Attendance: 6,965; Referee: John Brooks

18 February 2017 32	Hartlepool United	1–1	Plymouth Argyle	Hartlepool
15:00	Oates 27'	Report	Kennedy 76'	Stadium: Victoria Park; Attendance: 3,684; Referee: Andy Haines

25 February 2017 33	Colchester United	2–1	Hartlepool United	Colchester
15:00	Guthrie 63'; Porter 78' (pen.)	Report	Thomas 82'	Stadium: Colchester Community Stadium; Attendance: 3,357; Referee: Ben Toner

28 February 2017 34	Hartlepool United	4–0	Crewe Alexandra	Hartlepool
19:45	Alessandra 45', 85'; Amond 71'; Thomas 90'	Report		Stadium: Victoria Park; Attendance: 3,043; Referee: Richard Clark

4 March 2017 35	Hartlepool United	3–1	Exeter City	Hartlepool
15:00	Alessandra 66', 90'; Amond 69'	Report	Watkins 14'	Stadium: Victoria Park; Attendance: 3,775; Referee: Robert Lewis

11 March 2017 36	Notts County	2–1	Hartlepool United	Nottingham
15:00	Ameobi 47'; Grant 70'	Report	Hollis 78' (o.g.)	Stadium: Meadow Lane; Attendance: 8,653; Referee: Darren Deadman

14 March 2017 37	Cambridge United	0–1	Hartlepool United	Cambridge
19:45		Report	Woods 63'	Stadium: Abbey Stadium; Attendance: 3,824; Referee: Dean Whitestone

18 March 2017 38	Hartlepool United	0–2	Wycombe Wanderers	Hartlepool
15:00		Report	Akinfenwa 24'; Cowan-Hall 90'	Stadium: Victoria Park; Attendance: 3,356; Referee: David Webb

25 March 2017 39	Blackpool	2–1	Hartlepool United	Blackpool
15:00	Osayi-Samuel 21'; Vassell 80'	Report	Alessandra 18'	Stadium: Bloomfield Road; Attendance: 5,374; Referee: Darren England

1 April 2017 40	Hartlepool United	0–2	Portsmouth	Hartlepool
15:00		Report	Naismith 17'; Roberts 60'	Stadium: Victoria Park; Attendance: 4,500; Referee: Mark Brown

8 April 2017 41	Morecambe	1–1	Hartlepool United	Morecambe
15:00	Mullin 59'	Report	Amond 39'	Stadium: Globe Arena; Attendance: 1,548; Referee: Andy Haines

14 April 2017 42	Hartlepool United	1–1	Carlisle United	Hartlepool
15:00	Oates 64'	Report	Ibehre 7'	Stadium: Victoria Park; Attendance: 5,011; Referee: Carl Boyeson

17 April 2017 43	Leyton Orient	2–1	Hartlepool United	Leyton
15:00	Adeboyejo 18'; Abrahams 34'	Report	Oates 8'	Stadium: Brisbane Road; Attendance: 5,411; Referee: Dean Whitestone

22 April 2017 44	Hartlepool United	0–2	Barnet	Hartlepool
15:00		Report	Akinde 66'; Akinola 71'	Stadium: Victoria Park; Attendance: 4,208; Referee: Trevor Kettle

29 April 2017 45	Cheltenham Town	1–0	Hartlepool United	Cheltenham
15:00	Wright 18'	Report		Stadium: Whaddon Road; Attendance: 5,606; Referee: Ben Toner

6 May 2017 46	Hartlepool United	2–1	Doncaster Rovers	Hartlepool
17:30	Rodney 74', 83'	Report	Williams 31'	Stadium: Victoria Park; Attendance: 6,799; Referee: Mark Brown

=== FA Cup ===
6 November 2016 First round	Hartlepool United	3–0	Stamford	Hartlepool
14:00	Deverdics 65'; Gordon 82' (o.g.); Paynter 85'	Report		Stadium: Victoria Park; Attendance: 2,461; Referee: Anthony Backhouse

4 December 2016 Second round	Port Vale	4–0	Hartlepool United	Stoke-on-Trent
15:00	Cicilia 12'; Carroll 14' (o.g.); Jones 31'; Taylor 56' (pen.)	Report		Stadium: Vale Park; Attendance: 3,514; Referee: Darren Handley

=== EFL Cup ===
On 22 June 2016, the first round draw was made, Hartlepool United were drawn away against Preston North End.

9 August 2016 First round	Preston North End	1–0	Hartlepool United	Preston
19:45	Doyle 90'	Report		Stadium: Deepdale; Attendance: 4,509; Referee: Andy Woolmer

=== EFL Trophy ===
Pos	Div	Team	Pld	W	PW	PL	L	GF	GA	GD	Pts	Qualification
1	L1	Rochdale	3	2	1	0	0	5	3	+2	8	Advance to Round 2
2	ACA	Sunderland U21	3	2	0	1	0	4	2	+2	7	Advance to Round 2
3	L2	Notts County	3	1	0	0	2	4	5	−1	3	
4	L2	Hartlepool United	3	0	0	0	3	2	5	−3	0	

Source: Sky Sports

31 August 2016 Group stage 1	Notts County	2–1	Hartlepool United	Nottingham
19:45	Snijders 20'; Burke 36' (pen.)	Report	Oates 29'	Stadium: Meadow Lane; Attendance: 1,095; Referee: Darren England

4 October 2016 Group stage 2	Hartlepool United	0–1	Sunderland U23	Hartlepool
19:30		Report	Love 63'	Stadium: Victoria Park; Attendance: 1,295; Referee: John Brooks

9 November 2016 Group stage 3	Hartlepool United	1–2	Rochdale	Hartlepool
19:30	Oates 85'	Report	Noble-Lazarus 21'; Gillam 67'	Stadium: Victoria Park; Attendance: 380; Referee: Scott Duncan

== Squad statistics ==
=== Appearances and goals ===
No.	Pos	Nat	Player	Total		League Two		FA Cup		League Cup		Other	
No.	Pos	Nat	Player	Apps	Goals	Apps	Goals	Apps	Goals	Apps	Goals	Apps	Goals
1	GK	(Northern Ireland) NIR	Trevor Carson	25	0	23	0	2	0	0	0	0	0
2	DF	(England) ENG	Carl Magnay	14	2	13	2	0	0	1	0	0	0
3	DF	(Republic of Ireland) IRL	Jake Carroll	25	0	21	0	2	0	1	0	1	0
4	MF	(England) ENG	Nicky Featherstone	46	3	43	3	2	0	0	0	1	0
5	DF	(England) ENG	Rob Jones	5	0	4	0	1	0	0	0	0	0
6	DF	(England) ENG	Matthew Bates	24	1	20	1	2	0	1	0	1	0
7	MF	(England) ENG	Nathan Thomas	34	9	33	9	0	0	1	0	0	0
8	DF	(England) ENG	Brad Walker	23	1	21	1	0	0	0	0	2	0
9	FW	(Republic of Ireland) IRL	Pádraig Amond	49	14	46	14	2	0	1	0	0	0
10	FW	(England) ENG	Billy Paynter	26	4	21	3	2	1	0	0	3	0
11	FW	(England) ENG	Rhys Oates	27	5	25	3	0	0	0	0	2	2
13	GK	(England) ENG	Adam Bartlett	14	0	10	0	0	0	1	0	3	0
14	MF	(England) ENG	Michael Woods	40	2	36	2	2	0	1	0	1	0
15	FW	(England) ENG	Lewis Alessandra	50	9	46	9	2	0	1	0	1	0
16	DF	(England) ENG	Ben Pollock	2	0	0	0	0	0	0	0	2	0
17	MF	(England) ENG	Nicky Deverdics	33	2	28	1	2	1	1	0	2	0
18	MF	(England) ENG	Lewis Hawkins	38	0	34	0	2	0	0	0	2	0
19	DF	(England) ENG	Jordan Richards	20	0	15	0	2	0	0	0	3	0
20	FW	(England) ENG	Jake Orrell	3	0	0	0	1	0	0	0	2	0
22	DF	(Democratic Republic of the Congo) COD	Aristote Nsiala	25	1	21	1	2	0	1	0	1	0
22	FW	(England) ENG	Andrew Nelson	4	0	4	0	0	0	0	0	0	0
23	MF	(England) ENG	Connor Smith	2	0	1	0	0	0	0	0	1	0
24	MF	(England) ENG	Kieran Green	3	0	1	0	0	0	0	0	2	0
26	DF	(England) ENG	Scott Harrison	41	1	38	1	0	0	0	0	3	0
27	MF	(England) ENG	Jack Blackford	1	0	1	0	0	0	0	0	0	0
28	MF	(England) ENG	Josh Laurent	30	1	25	1	2	0	1	0	2	0
28	FW	(Northern Ireland) NIR	Louis Rooney	7	0	7	0	0	0	0	0	0	0
29	DF	(England) ENG	James Martin	6	0	3	0	0	0	0	0	3	0
32	FW	(England) ENG	Bradley Fewster	5	0	4	0	0	0	0	0	1	0
32	FW	(England) ENG	Connor Simpson	2	0	2	0	0	0	0	0	0	0
33	DF	(Northern Ireland) NIR	Liam Donnelly	33	0	32	0	0	0	0	0	1	0
34	MF	(England) ENG	Josh Hawkes	2	0	2	0	0	0	0	0	0	0
34	FW	(England) ENG	Tom Heardman	3	0	2	0	0	0	0	0	1	0
35	DF	(England) ENG	Kenton Richardson	11	0	11	0	0	0	0	0	0	0
36	DF	(England) ENG	Harly Wise	1	0	0	0	0	0	0	0	1	0
38	FW	(England) ENG	Devante Rodney	4	2	4	2	0	0	0	0	0	0
39	DF	(Republic of Ireland) IRL	Sean Kavanagh	9	0	9	0	0	0	0	0	0	0
42	GK	(England) ENG	Joe Fryer	14	0	14	0	0	0	0	0	0	0

=== Goalscorers ===
Rank	Name	League Two	FA Cup	League Cup	Other	Total
1	Pádraig Amond	14	0	0	0	14
2	Lewis Alessandra	9	0	0	0	9
2	Nathan Thomas	9	0	0	0	9
3	Rhys Oates	3	0	0	2	5
4	Billy Paynter	3	1	0	0	4
5	Nicky Featherstone	3	0	0	0	3
6	Nicky Deverdics	1	1	0	0	2
6	Carl Magnay	2	0	0	0	2
6	Devante Rodney	2	0	0	0	2
6	Michael Woods	2	0	0	0	2
7	Matthew Bates	1	0	0	0	1
7	Scott Harrison	1	0	0	0	1
7	Josh Laurent	1	0	0	0	1
7	Aristote Nsiala	1	0	0	0	1
7	Brad Walker	1	0	0	0	1

=== Clean Sheets ===
Rank	Name	League Two	FA Cup	League Cup	Other	Total
1	Trevor Carson	5	1	0	0	6
2	Adam Bartlett	2	0	0	0	2
2	Joe Fryer	2	0	0	0	2

=== Suspensions ===
Date Incurred	Name	Games Missed	Reason
27 August 2016	Aristote Nsiala	1	(red card) (vs. Newport County)
31 August 2016	Aristote Nsiala	3	(red card) (vs. Notts County)
24 September 2016	Scott Harrison	1	(red card) (vs. Plymouth Argyle)
27 September 2016	Nicky Featherstone	3	(red card) (vs. Luton Town)
29 October 2016	Liam Donnelly	1	(red card) (vs. Barnet)
29 November 2016	Scott Harrison	1	Booked
