= James Martin (footballer, born 1998) =

English footballer

Personal information
- Date of birth: 23 June 1998 (age 28)
- Place of birth: Washington, Tyne and Wear, England
- Position: Left-back

Team information
- Current team: Whitby Town

Youth career
- 2015–2016: Queen of the South

Senior career*
Years	Team	Apps	(Gls)
2016–2017	Hartlepool United	3	(0)
2017–2018	Dunston UTS	?	(?)
2018–2020	Whitley Bay	?	(?)
2020–	Whitby Town	11	(0)
- * Club domestic league appearances and goals as of 19:07, 15 September 2021 (UTC)

James Martin (born 23 June 1998) is an English professional footballer who plays as a left-back for Whitby Town.

== Playing career ==
Martin had a one-year scholarship with Scottish Championship club Queen of the South, but had to leave the club following issues over international clearance. He signed his first professional contract with Hartlepool United in May 2016, following a successful trial spell. He made his senior debut as a 74th-minute substitute for Jake Carroll in a 2–1 defeat to Notts County in an EFL Trophy group match at Meadow Lane on 4 October 2016.

After leaving Hartlepool, Martin signed for Dunston UTS. The following season, Martin moved to Whitley Bay.

In May 2020, Whitby Town signed Martin from Whitley Bay.

== Statistics ==
As of 25 November 2016.

Appearances and goals by club, season and competition
Club	Season	League			FA Cup		EFL Cup		Other		Total	
Club	Season	Division	Apps	Goals	Apps	Goals	Apps	Goals	Apps	Goals	Apps	Goals
Hartlepool United	2016–17	League Two	3	0	0	0	0	0	3 (Note: Appearance/s in the EFL Trophy.)	0	6	0
Career total			3	0	0	0	0	0	3	0	6	0
