= Jordan Richards (footballer, born 1993) =

English footballer

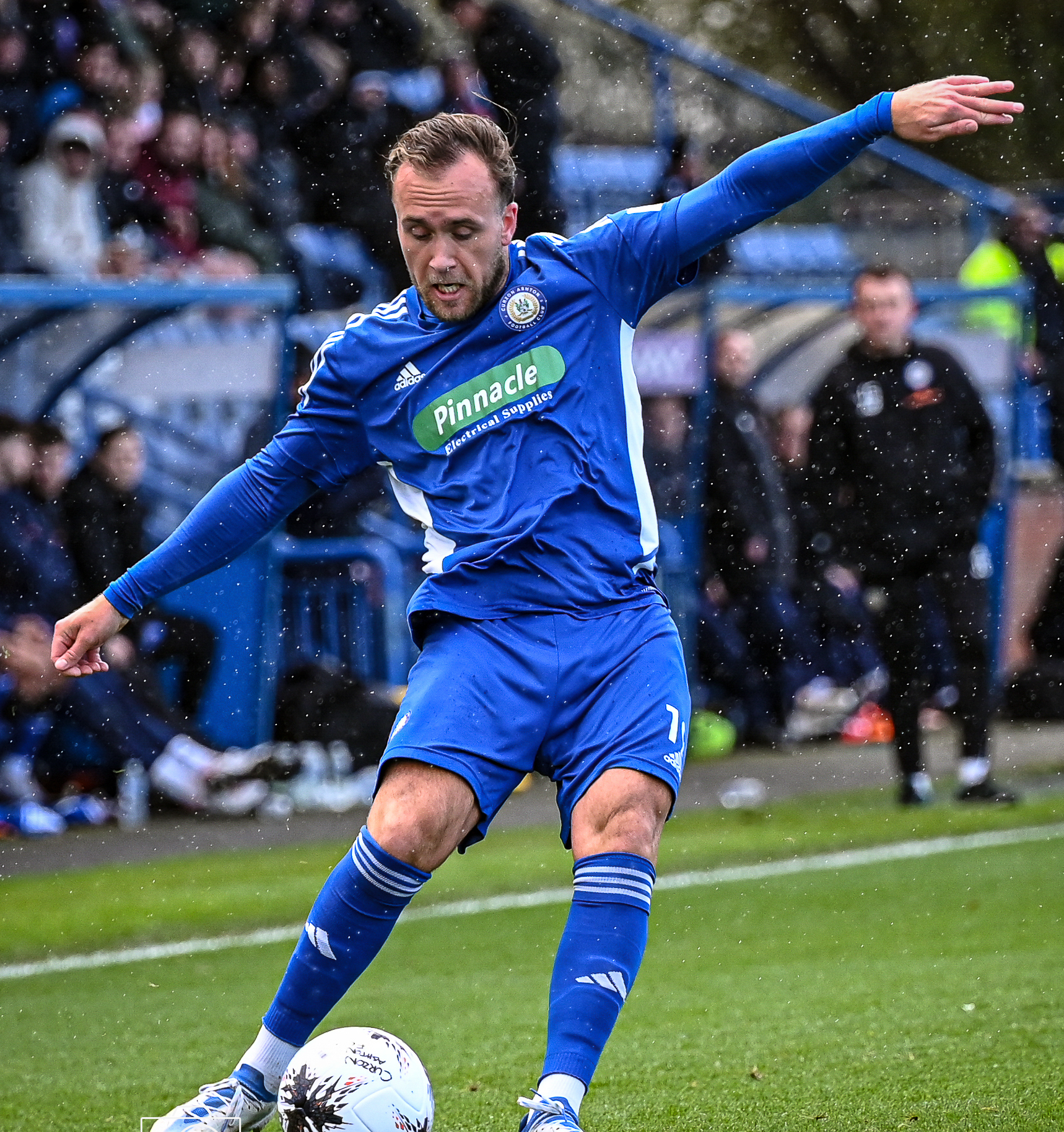
- Jordan Richards in 2023

Personal information
- Full name: Jordan Richards
- Date of birth: 25 April 1993 (age 33)
- Place of birth: Sunderland, England
- Height: 5 ft 9 in (1.75 m)
- Position: Right-back

Team information
- Current team: Curzon Ashton
- Number: 17

Youth career
- 2008–2011: Hartlepool United

Senior career*
Years	Team	Apps	(Gls)
2011–2017	Hartlepool United	66	(0)
2017	→ Alfreton Town (loan)	15	(0)
2017	Darlington	0	(0)
2017–2018	AFC Fylde	10	(0)
2018–2019	Southport	50	(2)
2019–2022	Farsley Celtic	69	(4)
2022–	Curzon Ashton	173	(4)
- * Club domestic league appearances and goals as of 10:41, 20 May 2026 (UTC)

Jordan Richards (born 25 April 1993) is an English footballer who plays as a defender for Curzon Ashton.

Richards played in the Football League for Hartlepool United. He has also played non-league football for Alfreton Town, Darlington, AFC Fylde, Southport and Farsley Celtic.

== Career ==
Richards was born in Sunderland, Tyne and Wear.

=== Hartlepool United ===
He started his career in the youth team of Hartlepool United on a two-year scholarship. He won the Youth Team Player of the Year Award for the 2010–11 season. In the summer of 2011, Richards signed his first professional contract. He made his professional debut on 20 March 2012, in a 1–0 defeat to Oldham Athletic, replacing Paul Murray as a late substitute. A month later, he was handed his first start playing the full 90 minutes against Tranmere Rovers in a 1–1 draw.

Jordan was praised by manager John Hughes after his run in the first-team, but was then dealt with the blow of being ruled out for the rest of the 2012–13 season due to a knee injury.

On 7 May 2014, Richards extended his contract with Pools.

Richards joined National League North side Alfreton Town on a one-month loan deal in February 2017, the deal was later extended until the end of the season. However in April 2017, newly appointed caretaker manager Matthew Bates recalled Richards to Hartlepool. At the end of the 2016–17 season, Richards was one of nine players released by the club.

=== AFC Fylde ===
After his release from Hartlepool, Richards signed for local rivals Darlington in August 2017. He left Darlington after only 11 days. The following week, Richards signed for National League side AFC Fylde. He made his debut in a 2–1 defeat to FC Halifax Town on 2 September 2017.

Richards made 14 appearances for Fylde in all competitions.

=== Southport ===
Richards joined National League North side Southport on a free transfer on 12 January 2018. Richards scored his first goal in senior football in August 2018, direct from a free-kick, for Southport in a 3–1 defeat to Altrincham.

Richards was released by Southport at the end of the 2018–19 season. He made 50 league appearances for the National League North club. During his time with Southport, Richards won both the Liverpool Senior Cup and Lancashire FA Challenge Trophy in the 2018–19 season.

=== Farsley Celtic ===
In July 2019, Richards signed for newly promoted National League North side Farsley Celtic. Richards was released from his contract by mutual agreement on 12 January 2022.

=== Curzon Ashton ===
Two days after departing Farsley Celtic, Richards signed for fellow National League North club Curzon Ashton. The move saw him link up with his former Farsley boss Adam Lakeland. Richards made his first appearance for Curzon on 15 January 2022, coming on as a substitute, against Kettering Town. Richards scored his first goal for the club against his former team Darlington in a 2–0 win on 15 April 2022.

In May 2023, it was announced he had signed a new one-year contract with the club.

In the 2023–24 season, Richards played in every league game and featured in the club's unsuccessful play-off campaign.

== Personal life ==
He is the nephew of former England international footballer Michael Gray.

== Career statistics ==
As of match played 25 April 2026

Appearances and goals by club, season and competition
Club	Season	League			FA Cup		League Cup		Other		Total	
Club	Season	Division	Apps	Goals	Apps	Goals	Apps	Goals	Apps	Goals	Apps	Goals
Hartlepool United	2011–12	League One	2	0	0	0	0	0	0	0	2	0
Hartlepool United	2012–13	League One	11	0	0	0	0	0	0	0	11	0
Hartlepool United	2013–14	League Two	19	0	1	0	0	0	2 (Note: Appearances in the Football League Trophy)	0	22	0
Hartlepool United	2014–15	League Two	9	0	1	0	0	0	0	0	10	0
Hartlepool United	2015–16	League Two	11	0	1	0	0	0	0	0	12	0
Hartlepool United	2016–17	League Two	15	0	2	0	0	0	3 (Note: Appearances in the EFL Trophy)	0	20	0
Hartlepool United	Total		67	0	5	0	0	0	5	0	77	0
Alfreton Town (loan)	2016–17	National League North	15	0	—		—		0	0	15	0
AFC Fylde	2017–18	National League	10	0	3	0	—		1 (Note: Appearances in the FA Trophy)	0	14	0
Southport	2017–18	National League North	17	0	—		—		—		17	0
Southport	2018–19	National League North	33	2	6	0	—		2	0	41	2
Southport	Total		50	2	6	0	—		2	0	58	2
Farsley Celtic	2019–20	National League North	34	1	1	0	—		5	0	40	1
Farsley Celtic	2020–21	National League North	17	2	2	0	—		2	0	21	2
Farsley Celtic	2021–22	National League North	18	1	1	0	—		2	0	21	1
Farsley Celtic	Total		69	4	4	0	—		9	0	82	4
Curzon Ashton	2021–22	National League North	23	2	—		—		—		23	2
Curzon Ashton	2022–23	National League North	33	1	4	1	—		2	0	39	2
Curzon Ashton	2023–24	National League North	46	1	4	0	—		5	0	55	1
Curzon Ashton	2024–25	National League North	31	0	4	0	—		5	0	40	0
Curzon Ashton	2025–26	National League North	40	0	0	0	—		3	0	43	0
Curzon Ashton	Total		173	4	12	1	—		15	0	200	5
Career total			384	10	30	1	0	0	32	0	446	11
