= Ben Pollock =

English footballer

Personal information
- Full name: Ben Pollock
- Date of birth: 6 January 1998 (age 28)
- Place of birth: Bolton, England
- Position: Defender

Team information
- Current team: Spennymoor Town
- Number: 8

Youth career
- 2014–2016: Newcastle United

Senior career*
Years	Team	Apps	(Gls)
2016–2017	Hartlepool United	0	(0)
2017–2018	Dunston UTS	24	(2)
2018–2019	Billingham Synthonia	37	(8)
2019–2022	Hereford	54	(0)
2022–2023	Boston United	43	(1)
2023–2024	Spennymoor Town	39	(3)
2024–2025	Chester	15	(0)
2025–	Spennymoor Town	14	(0)
- * Club domestic league appearances and goals as of 21:02, 7 May 2025 (UTC)

Ben Pollock (born 6 January 1998) is an English footballer who plays as a defender for National League North club Spennymoor Town.

== Career ==
Pollock spent his youth with Middlesbrough, Leeds United, and Newcastle United, before he signed his first professional contract with Hartlepool United in May 2016, following a successful trial spell. He made his senior debut in a 1–0 defeat to Sunderland U23 in an EFL Trophy group match at Victoria Park on 4 October 2016.

On 27 July 2017, Pollock scored for Grimsby Town in a 7–0 win against Winterton Rangers whilst on trial. During the same pre-season, Pollock also went on trial with Harrogate Town.

In July 2018, Pollock signed for Northern League Division Two club Billingham Synthonia after his father, Jamie, took over the club as chairman and manager. While at the club, Pollock made the transition from a defender to a centre midfielder.

On 4 October 2019, following 37 appearances for Billingham Synthonia, Pollock joined National League North side Hereford after his move to then EFL League Two side Bury fell through. He was made available for Hereford's FA Cup third qualifying round tie at Tamworth the following day. He won the club's Player of the Year award for the 2021–22 season. Pollock announced his departure from the club on 1 June 2022.

Pollock signed for Boston United on 7 June 2022. At the end of the season, he won Boston's player of the year award.

On 20 June 2023, Pollock signed for Spennymoor Town. Following the expiration of his contract at Spennymoor, Ben signed for fellow National League North side Chester in May 2024.

On 18 February 2025, Pollock returned to former club Spennymoor Town for an undisclosed fee.

== Style of play ==
Pollock is a versatile footballer and can play centre-back, right-back and central midfield. Upon signing for Chester, the club's manager Calum McIntyre said of Pollock: "His data from last season speaks for itself and it is clear we are signing one of the highest performing defenders in the division last season. He dominates aerially, has real experience at the level and is really hungry to progress further."

== Personal life ==
Ben's father, Jamie Pollock, is also a former professional footballer. His brother, Mattie Pollock, plays for Watford.

== Career statistics ==
As of match played 26 April 2025

Appearances and goals by club, season and competition
Club	Season	League			FA Cup		League Cup		Other		Total	
Club	Season	Division	Apps	Goals	Apps	Goals	Apps	Goals	Apps	Goals	Apps	Goals
Hartlepool United	2016–17	League Two	0	0	0	0	0	0	2 (Note: Appearance(s) in EFL Trophy)	0	2	0
Dunston UTS	2017–18	Northern League Division One	24	2	0	0	—		0	0	24	2
Billingham Synthonia	2018–19	Northern League Division Two	37	8	2	0	—		2 (Note: Appearance(s) in FA Vase)	0	41	8
Hereford	2019–20	National League North	13	0	0	0	—		0	0	13	0
Hereford	2020–21	National League North	2	0	0	0	—		4 (Note: Appearance(s) in FA Trophy)	0	6	0
Hereford	2021–22	National League North	39	0	1	0	—		0	0	40	0
Hereford	Total		54	0	1	0	—		4	0	59	0
Boston United	2022–23	National League North	43	1	0	0	—		1	0	44	1
Spennymoor Town	2023–24	National League North	39	3	1	0	—		1	0	41	3
Chester	2024–25	National League North	15	0	2	0	—		1	0	18	0
Spennymoor Town	2024–25	National League North	14	0	—		—		—		14	0
Career total			226	14	6	0	0	0	11	0	243	14
