= Rai Simons =

Bermudian footballer (born 1996)

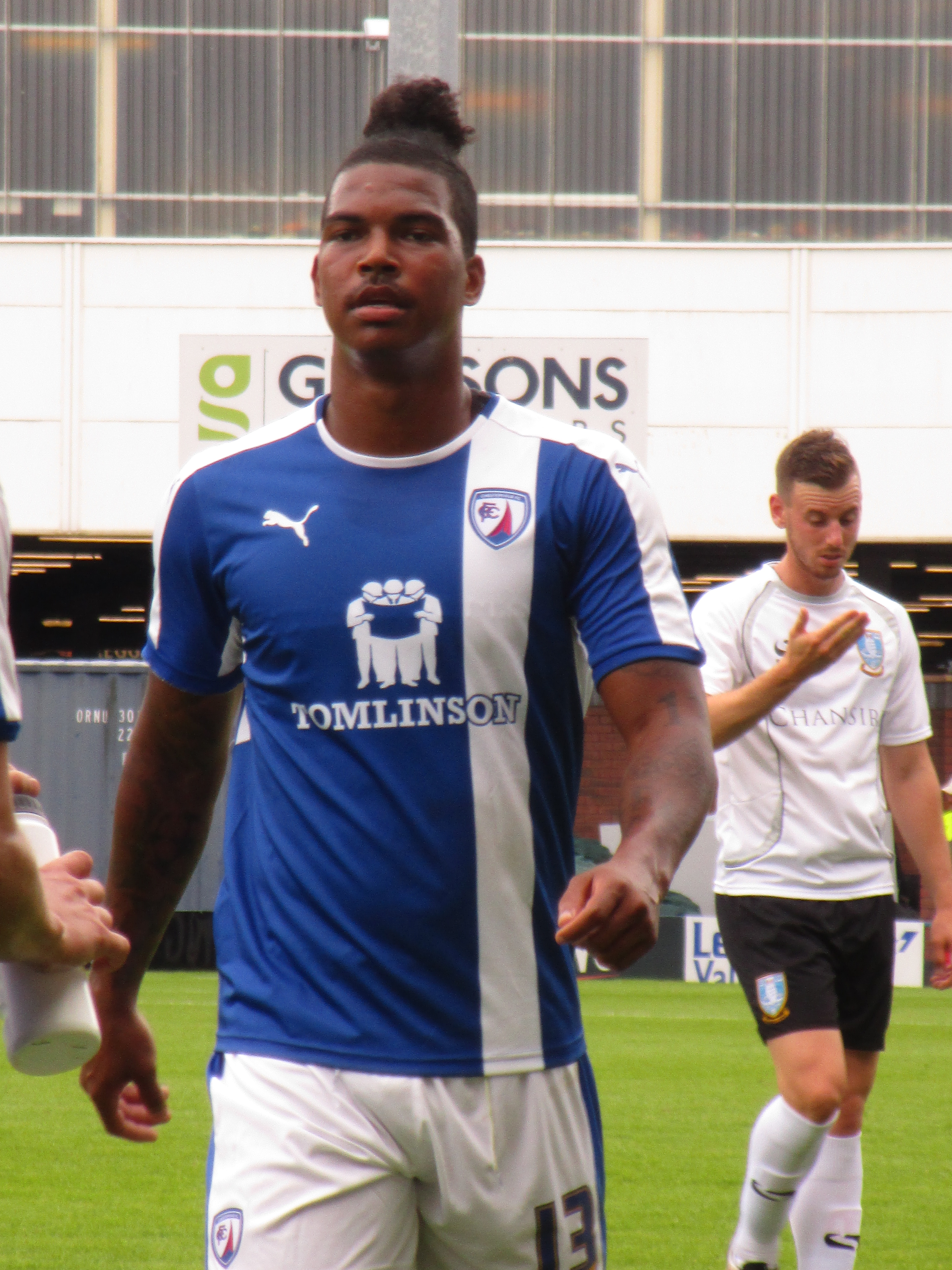
- Simons playing for Chesterfield in 2016

Personal information
- Full name: Rai Quinton Arthur Simons
- Date of birth: 11 January 1996 (age 30)
- Place of birth: Hamilton, Bermuda
- Height: 1.82 m (6 ft 0 in)
- Position: Striker

Youth career
- North Village Rams
- Newcastle Town
- Ilkeston FC

Senior career*
Years	Team	Apps	(Gls)
2013	Newcastle Town		
2013–2015	Ilkeston	22	(1)
2015–2017	Chesterfield	39	(4)
2018–	North Village Rams		

International career^{‡}
20??–20??	Bermuda U17		
2013	English Colleges U17		
201?–201?	Bermuda U20		
2013–	Bermuda	6	(1)
Medal record
Men's football
Representing Bermuda
Island Games
Winner	2013 Bermudas
- * Club domestic league appearances and goals as of 21:17, 27 December 2016 (UTC) ‡ National team caps and goals as of 23:00, 5 June 2016 (UTC)

Rai Quinton Arthur Simons (born 11 January 1996) is a Bermudian professional footballer who plays as a striker. He has been capped six times, and scored one goal for the Bermuda national team in FIFA recognised matches. He was joint-top goal scorer at the 2013 Island Games Men's Football Tournament with three goals.

== Club career ==
Simons started his career at North Village Rams as a youth player. At the age 15, Simons had trials and spent a week training with Premier League club West Ham United, before he eventually signed for Newcastle Town. He was part of the Newcastle Town under-18 team that won the Sentinel Cup in a record 8–1 win over Alsager Town at the Britannia Stadium, scoring with an "unstoppable shot" having replaced Callum Kenny in the 57th minute as a substitute.

He went on to join English Northern Premier League club Ilkeston in summer 2013, signing a two-year contract with the club. During his time at Ilkeston, Simons played for both the academy and first team sides, before attracting interest from a number of Football League clubs. He was a key member of the Ilkeston team which reached the Northern Premier League Premier Division play-off final in the 2014–15 season.

In April 2015, it was announced that Simons had joined League One club Chesterfield. He scored his first Chesterfield goal in a pre-season friendly against his former club Ilkeston, which had been arranged as part of the transfer deal. Simons made his professional debut on 26 September 2015 as a 66th-minute substitute in Chesterfield's 2–1 home defeat to Burton Albion. He scored his first professional goal on 10 October in Chesterfield's 3–1 home defeat to Gillingham.

== International career ==
Simons played for Bermuda under-17's in their unsuccessful 2013 CONCACAF U-17 Championship qualifying campaign in July 2012.

Whilst studying as a student at Newcastle-under-Lyme College, Simons was selected to represent the English Colleges under-17's in January 2013 at the Caput Mundi Tournament in Italy.

Simons went on to represent Bermuda, the only FIFA affiliated side at the 2013 Island Games. Bermuda went on to win men's football tournament, with a 1–0 win over Greenland on 15 July 2013 at Bermuda National Stadium, Hamilton. Simons scored three goals during the competition, leaving him as joint-top goal scorer along with five other players.

In April 2015, he was then called up to the Bermuda under-20's squad for their 2015 CONCACAF U-20 Championship qualifying campaign. He scored a hat-trick in the group match against Guadeloupe under-20's on 24 June 2014 at Estadio Panamericano, San Cristóbal.

Simons was called up and made his full international debut for Bermuda against Grenada, in a FIFA sanctioned match, on 7 March 2015 in a friendly. The match finished 2–2, with Simons scoring on his debut before being substituted in the 81st minute for Antwan Russell. Following his success in two friendlies against Grenada, Simons was called up again to face the Bahamas in the 2018 FIFA World Cup qualification first round matches. He played in both matches, with Bermuda winning 8–0 on aggregate.

== Personal life ==
Simons moved to England when he was 15 and stayed with his cousin, Dale Eve and sister, Taylor in Stoke-on-Trent where he attended school. His mother is Karen Simons and his father, Arthur Simons was also a footballer who played as a left-back for North Village Rams.

== Career statistics ==
=== Club ===
As of match played 17 April 2017

Appearances and goals by club, season and competition
Club	Season	League			FA Cup		League Cup		Other		Total	
Club	Season	Division	Apps	Goals	Apps	Goals	Apps	Goals	Apps	Goals	Apps	Goals
Ilkeston	2013–14	Northern Premier League Premier Division	7	0	1	0	—		2 (Note: Appearance(s) in Derbyshire Senior Cup)	0	10	0
Ilkeston	2014–15	Northern Premier League Premier Division	15	1	0	0	—		7 (Note: Four appearances in Northern Premier League Challenge Cup; three appearances three goals in Derbyshire Senior Cup)	3	22	4
Ilkeston	Total		22	1	1	0	—		9	3	32	4
Chesterfield	2015–16	League One	20	4	1	1	0	0	1 (Note: Appearance(s) in Football League Trophy)	0	22	5
Chesterfield	2016–17	League One	19	0	0	0	1	0	4	0	24	0
Chesterfield	Total		39	4	1	1	1	0	5	0	46	5
Career total			61	5	2	1	1	0	14	3	78	9

=== International ===
Scores and results list Bermuda's goal tally first, score column indicates score after each Simons goal.

List of international goals scored by Rai Simons
No.	Date	Venue	Opponent	Score	Result	Competition
1	6 March 2015	National Sports Centre, Hamilton, Bermuda	Grenada	1–1	2–2	Friendly

== Honours ==
Bermuda

- Island Games: 2013
