= Harly Wise =

English footballer

Personal information
- Full name: Harly John Wise
- Date of birth: 7 June 1996 (age 30)
- Place of birth: Hammersmith, England
- Height: 1.85 m (6 ft 1 in)
- Position: Defender

Youth career
- 2003–2014: Queens Park Rangers

Senior career*
Years	Team	Apps	(Gls)
2014–2016	Queens Park Rangers	0	(0)
2016	Hemel Hempstead Town	5	(0)
2016–2017	Hartlepool United	0	(0)
2017	Dulwich Hamlet	1	(0)
2017	Hayes & Yeading	6	(0)
2017–2018	Hendon	10	(0)
- * Club domestic league appearances and goals as of 00:00, 25 November 2016 (UTC)

Harly John Wise (born 7 June 1996) is an English criminal and former professional footballer. Between 2014 and 2018, he played as a defender for several clubs including Queens Park Rangers, but made only one competitive appearance, in a 2016 EFL Trophy match for Hartlepool United. In 2026, he was found guilty of a range of firearms and drugs offences and sentenced to 25 years in prison.

== Football career ==
Wise came through the youth team at Queens Park Rangers to turn professional in March 2014. He was released by Queens Park Rangers at the end of the 2015–16 season. After a spell at Hemel Hempstead Town, he signed for Hartlepool United in October 2016, following a successful trial the previous month. He made his senior debut as a half-time substitute for Matthew Bates in a 2–1 defeat to Rochdale in an EFL Trophy group match at Victoria Park on 9 November 2016. Wise was released by Hartlepool on 20 February 2017 after his short-term contract expired. He signed for Dulwich Hamlet in March 2017. Wise joined Hayes & Yeading for the 2017–18 season. Wise signed for Hendon in October 2017.

== Criminal offences and prison ==
Wise became involved in organised crime, including dealing Class A and Class B drugs, and brokering the sale of two handguns and ammunition in 2020. He used an encrypted communications platform to plot a range of further firearms and drugs offences. He admitted conspiracy to supply cocaine, cannabis and methylamphetamine, conspiracy to transfer prohibited weapons and conspiracy to kidnap. On 29 January 2026, he was sentenced to 25 years in prison at Bolton Crown Court.

== Football career statistics ==
As of 25 November 2016.

Appearances and goals by club, season and competition
Club	Season	League			FA Cup		EFL Cup		Other		Total	
Club	Season	Division	Apps	Goals	Apps	Goals	Apps	Goals	Apps	Goals	Apps	Goals
Hartlepool United	2016–17	League Two	0	0	0	0	0	0	1 (Note: Appearance/s in the EFL Trophy.)	0	1	0
Career total			0	0	0	0	0	0	1	0	1	0
