= 2015–16 Chesterfield F.C. season =

Chesterfield
2015–16 season
- Owner: Dave Allen
- Chairman: Dave Allen
- Manager: Dean Saunders (until 28 November 2015); Danny Wilson (from 24 December 2015)
- Stadium: Proact Stadium
- League One: 18th
- FA Cup: Second round (eliminated by Walsall)
- League Cup: First round (eliminated by Carlisle United)
- Football League Trophy: Second round (eliminated by Rochdale)
- Top goalscorer: League: Lee Novak (14); All: Lee Novak (15)
Home colours	Away colours

The 2015–16 season was Chesterfield's 149th season in their history and their second consecutive season in League One. Along with League One, the club also competed in the FA Cup, League Cup and Football League Trophy. The season covers the period from 1 July 2015 to 30 June 2016.

== Transfers ==
=== Transfers in ===
Date from	Position	Nationality	Name	From	Fee	Ref.
1 July 2015	CF	ENG	Sylvan Ebanks-Blake	Preston North End	Free transfer	
1 July 2015	ST	BER	Rai Simons	Ilkeston	Undisclosed	
22 July 2015	CF	ENG	Jake Orrell	Gateshead	Free transfer	
6 August 2015	GK	ENG	Alex Cairns	Leeds United	Free transfer	
6 August 2015	MF	ENG	Dion Donohue	Sutton Coldfield Town	Free transfer	
16 August 2015	CM	ESP	Ángel Martínez	Millwall	Free transfer	
24 August 2015	CM	ENG	Liam O'Neil	West Bromwich Albion	Undisclosed	
11 September 2015	DM	AUS	Chris Herd	Aston Villa	Free transfer	
26 October 2015	DF	NZL	Liam Graham		Free transfer	
1 February 2016	MF	ENG	Gary Liddle	Bradford City	Undosclosed	
1 February 2016	MF	IRL	Connor Dimaio	Sheffield United	Free transfer	
18 February 2016	FW	ENG	Jordan Slew	Cambridge United	Free transfer	

=== Transfers out ===
Date from	Position	Nationality	Name	To	Fee	Ref.
1 July 2015	CB	ENG	Jack Broadhead	Free agent	Released	
1 July 2015	CF	ENG	Charlie Dawes	Free agent	Released	
1 July 2015	LW	ENG	Gary Roberts	Portsmouth	Undisclosed	
1 July 2015	CM	IRL	Jimmy Ryan	Fleetwood Town	Free	
27 July 2015	LM	ENG	Sam Clucas	Hull City	£1,300,000	
30 July 2015	RB	ENG	Tendayi Darikwa	Burnley	£600,000	
7 January 2016	GK	ENG	Alex Cairns	Rotherham United	Free	
22 January 2016	FW	CIV	Armand Gnanduillet	Leyton Orient	Undosclosed	
28 January 2016	MF	EGY	Sam Morsy	Wigan Athletic	Undisclosed	

=== Loans in ===
Date from	Position	Nationality	Name	From	Date until	Ref.
14 August 2015	CF	ENG	Lee Novak	Birmingham City	End of season	
11 September 2015	CB	ENG	Jack Fitzwater	West Bromwich Albion	8 October 2015	
26 October 2015	DF	ENG	Richard Wood	Rotherham United	Three-month	
1 February 2016	DF	ENG	Tom Anderson	Burnley	End of season	
18 February 2016	DF	ENG	Declan John	Cardiff City	One-month	
19 March 2016	MF	ENG	Jamal Campbell-Ryce	Sheffield United	End of season	

=== Loans out ===
Date from	Position	Nationality	Name	To	Date until	Ref.
14 August 2015	GK	ENG	Aaron Chapman	Bristol Rovers	12 September 2015	
9 October 2015	FW	CIV	Armand Gnanduillet	Stevenage	One-month	
11 February 2016	FW	ENG	Byron Harrison	Stevenage	One-month	
8 March 2016	MF	ENG	Dan Gardner	Bury	End of season	
16 March 2016	FW	ENG	Emmanuel Dieseruvwe	Mansfield Town	End of season	

== Competitions ==
=== Pre-season friendlies ===
On 18 May 2015, Chesterfield announced two pre-season friendlies against Matlock Town and Belper Town. On 27 May 2015, a friendly against Hartlepool United was announced. A pre-season friendly against Hull City was confirmed on 9 June 2015. A sixth friendly against Buxton was confirmed on 19 June 2015. On 22 June 2015, Chesterfield announced Burnley will visit on 25 July 2015.

9 July 2015 Friendly	Matlock Town	0–3	Chesterfield	Matlock
19:45 BST		Report	O'Shea 14' (pen.); Ebanks-Blake 18'; Gnanduillet 82'	Stadium: Causeway Lane; Attendance: 1,119

10 July 2015 Friendly	Buxton	0–4	Chesterfield	Buxton
19:45 BST		Report	Jones 25'; O'Shea 37'; Orrell 47'; Dieseruvwe 60'	Stadium: The Silverlands

17 July 2015 Friendly	SC Olhanense	0–2	Chesterfield	Algarve, Portugal
15:00 CEST		Report	Gnanduillet; Banks

21 July 2015 Friendly	Chesterfield	1–3	Hull City	Chesterfield
15:00 BST	Evatt 19'	Report	Maguire 38'; Robertson 51'; Jahraldo-Martin 76'	Stadium: Proact Stadium

25 July 2015 Friendly	Chesterfield	3–2	Burnley	Chesterfield
15:00 BST	Orrell 25'; Gnanduillet 67'; Harrison 89'	Report	Jutkiewicz 13'; Boyd 21'	Stadium: Proact Stadium

28 July 2015 Friendly	Ilkeston	1–3	Chesterfield	Ilkeston
19:45 BST	Marshall 43'	Report	O'Shea 14'; Gnanduillet 28'; Simons 69'	Stadium: New Manor Ground; Attendance: 523

1 August 2015 Friendly	Hartlepool United	0–1	Chesterfield	Hartlepool
15:00 BST		Report	Morsy 75'	Stadium: Victoria Park; Attendance: 1,269 (54 away fans)

=== League One ===
==== League table ====
Pos	Team	Pld	W	D	L	GF	GA	GD	Pts
16	Bury	46	16	12	18	56	73	−17	57 (Note: Bury were deducted 3 points for playing the unregistered Callum Styles against Southend United on 8 May.)
17	Oldham Athletic	46	12	18	16	44	58	−14	54
18	Chesterfield	46	15	8	23	58	70	−12	53
19	Fleetwood Town	46	12	15	19	52	56	−4	51
20	Shrewsbury Town	46	13	11	22	58	79	−21	50

Updated to match(es) played on 1 July 2016. Source: BBC Sport
Rules for classification: 1) Points; 2) Goal difference; 3) Number of goals scored

==== Matches ====
On 17 June 2015, the fixtures for the forthcoming season were announced.

8 August 2015 1	Chesterfield	3–1	Barnsley	Chesterfield
15:00 BST	O'Shea 49'; Ebanks-Blake 72'; Morsy 73'	Report	Wilkinson 4'	Stadium: Proact Stadium; Attendance: 8,117; Referee: Andy Woolmer

15 August 2015 2	Sheffield United	2–0	Chesterfield	Sheffield
15:00 BST	Adams 3', 46'	Report		Stadium: Bramall Lane; Attendance: 23,031; Referee: Kevin Wright

18 August 2015 3	Shrewsbury Town	1–2	Chesterfield	Shrewsbury
19:45 BST	Sadler 88'	Report	Ebanks-Blake 49'; Morsy 64'	Stadium: New Meadow; Attendance: 4,935; Referee: Mark Heywood

22 August 2015 4	Chesterfield	0–0	Rochdale	Chesterfield
15:00 BST		Report		Stadium: Proact Stadium; Attendance: 6,254; Referee: Keith Hill

29 August 2015 5	Millwall	0–2	Chesterfield	Bermondsey
15:00 BST		Report	O'Shea 17', 90'	Stadium: New Den; Attendance: 8,374; Referee: Darren Deadman

5 September 2015 6	Chesterfield	2–3	Wigan Athletic	Chesterfield
15:00 BST	Gardner 62'; Barnett 68' (o.g.)	Report	Barnett 81'; Davies 87' (pen.); Hiwula 90'	Stadium: Proact Stadium; Attendance: 7,145; Referee: Mark Brown

12 September 2015 7	Chesterfield	3–3	Colchester United	Chesterfield
15:00 BST	Talbot (red card) 16'; Jones 22'; Novak 62'; Morsy 74'	Report	Massey 29'; Moncur 76'; Raglan 90+2' (o.g.)	Stadium: Proact Stadium; Attendance: 5,227; Referee: Ian Williamson

19 September 2015 8	Coventry City	1–0	Chesterfield	Coventry
15:00 BST	Armstrong 50'	Report	Dieseruvwe (red card) 89'	Stadium: Ricoh Arena; Attendance: 11,003; Referee: Darren Bond

26 September 2015 9	Chesterfield	1–2	Burton Albion	Chesterfield
15:00 BST	Hird 2'	Report	Beavon 46'; Binnom-Williams 90'	Stadium: Proact Stadium; Attendance: 6,762; Referee: David Webb

29 September 2015 10	Blackpool	2–0	Chesterfield	Blackpool
19:45 BST	Cullen 2'; Potts 68'	Report		Stadium: Bloomfield Road; Attendance: 5,960; Referee: Scott Duncan

3 October 2015 11	Crewe Alexandra	1–2	Chesterfield	Crewe
15:00 BST	Fox 36'	Report	Gardner 8' 57'	Stadium: Gresty Road; Attendance: 4,053; Referee: Ross Joyce

10 October 2015 12	Chesterfield	1–3	Gillingham	Chesterfield
15:00 BST	Simons 35'	Report	Egan 26'; Donnelly 54'; Lennon 72'	Stadium: Proact Stadium; Attendance: 6,026; Referee: Nick Kinseley

17 October 2015 13	Walsall	1–2	Chesterfield	Walsall
15:00 BST	Preston 90+3'	Report	Ebanks-Blake 5'; Evatt 54'	Stadium: Bescot Stadium; Attendance: 4,766; Referee: Chris Kavanagh

20 October 2015 14	Chesterfield	3–0	Southend United	Chesterfield
19:45 BST	Novak 8'; Ebanks-Blake 37' 62'	Report		Stadium: Proact Stadium; Attendance: 5,703; Referee: Graham Salisbury

24 October 2015 15	Chesterfield	0–3	Scunthorpe United	Chesterfield
15:00 BST	Jones (red card) 55'	Report	Madden 56' (pen.) 78'; McSheffrey 63'	Stadium: Proact Stadium; Attendance: 6,340; Referee: Darren England

31 October 2015 16	Fleetwood Town	0–1	Chesterfield	Fleetwood
15:00 GMT		Report	Ebanks-Blake 30'	Stadium: Highbury Stadium; Attendance: 3,107; Referee: Trevor Kettle

14 November 2015 17	Chesterfield	1–2	Oldham	Chesterfield
15:00 GMT	Ebanks-Blake 34'	Report	Poleon 72'; Philliskirk 87'	Stadium: Proact Stadium; Attendance: 6,178; Referee: Tim Robinson

21 November 2015 18	Port Vale	3–2	Chesterfield	Burslem
15:00 GMT	Kelly 6'; Leitch-Smith 10'; Dodds 48'	Report	Novak 8'; Simons 90+1'	Stadium: Vale Park; Attendance: 4,420; Referee: Michael Bull

24 November 2015 19	Doncaster	3–0	Chesterfield	Doncaster
19:45 GMT	Tyson 62'; Williams 70'; Stewart 90+2'	Report		Stadium: Keepmoat Stadium; Attendance: 5,521; Referee: Kevin Friend

28 November 2015 20	Chesterfield	0–4	Swindon Town	Chesterfield
15:00 GMT		Report	Ajose 3', 80'; Thompson 14'; Obika 48'	Stadium: Proact Stadium; Attendance: 6,178; Referee: Tim Robinson

12 December 2015 21	Bury	1–0	Chesterfield	Bury
15:00 BST	Mayor 68'	Report		Stadium: Gigg Lane; Attendance: 2,962; Referee: Peter Bankes

19 December 2015 22	Chesterfield	0–1	Bradford City	Chesterfield
15:00 GMT		Report	McMahon 72'	Stadium: Proact Stadium; Attendance: 6,795; Referee: James Adcock

26 December 2015 23	Peterborough United	2–0	Chesterfield	Peterborough
15:00 GMT	Washington 45+1' 76'; Maddison (yellow card) 90'	Report	Banks (yellow card) 90+1'	Stadium: ABAX Stadium; Attendance: 7,153; Referee: Andy Woolmer

28 December 2015 24	Chesterfield	1–1	Coventry City	Chesterfield
15:00 GMT	Novak 38'; Morsy (yellow card) 54'	Report	Maddison (yellow card) 54' (goal) 89'; Fleck (yellow card) 84'	Stadium: Proact Stadium; Attendance: 9,057; Referee: Paul Tierney

2 January 2016 25	Chesterfield	7–1	Shrewsbury Town	Chesterfield
15:00 GMT	O'Shea 40' (pen.); Novak 45+1' 81' (pen.) 89'; Herd (yellow card) 59'; Morsy (yellow card) 70'; O'Neil (yellow card) 71'; Simons 73' 87'	Report	Black (yellow card) 20'; Brown (yellow card) 34' (yellow-red card); Whitbread 66'; Lawrence (yellow card) 72'	Stadium: Proact Stadium; Attendance: 6,233; Referee: Geoff Eltringham

9 January 2016 26	Rochdale	2–3	Chesterfield	Rochdale
15:00 GMT	Rose (yellow card) 22'; McDermott (yellow card) 46'; Lund (yellow card) 53'; Henderson 58'; Bennett 90+3'	Report	O'Shea 26'; Hird (yellow card) 35'; Ariyibi (yellow card) 48' (yellow-red card); Novak 78'; Ebanks-Blake 80'; Lee (yellow card) 90+4'	Stadium: Spotland Stadium; Attendance: 2,965; Referee: Carl Boyeson

16 January 2016 27	Wigan Athletic	3–1	Chesterfield	Wigan
15:00 GMT	Power 6'; James 38'; Jacobs 39'; Perkins (yellow card) 77'; Jääskeläinen (yellow card) 90'	Report	O'Neil (yellow card) 35'; Herd (yellow card) 45+3'; Banks 79'	Stadium: DW Stadium; Attendance: 9,091; Referee: Ross Joyce

23 January 2016 28	Chesterfield	1–2	Millwall	Chesterfield
15:00 GMT	Morsy 25'	Report	O'Brien 27'; Morison (yellow card) 45'; Gregory 47'	Stadium: Proact Stadium; Attendance: 7,078; Referee: Chris Sarginson

6 February 2016 29	Chesterfield	0–1	Peterborough United	Chesterfield
15:00 GMT	Herd (yellow card) 56'; O'Neil (yellow card) 77'	Report	Smith (yellow card) 27' (yellow-red card); Forrester (yellow card) 52'; Nichols 55'; Santos (yellow card) 64' (yellow-red card); Toffolo (yellow card) 73'	Stadium: Proact Stadium; Attendance: 6,544; Referee: David Coote (referee)

12 February 2016 30	Burton Albion	1–0	Chesterfield	Burton upon Trent
19:45 GMT	Butcher 45+1'	Report	Herd (yellow card) 51'; Anderson (yellow card) 54'; Banks (yellow card) 89'	Stadium: Pirelli Stadium; Attendance: 4,489; Referee: (England) Simon Hooper

16 February 2016 31	Colchester United	1–1	Chesterfield	Colchester
19:45 GMT	Bonne 69'; Edwards (yellow card) 77'	Report	Liddle (red card) 18'; Ariyibi (yellow card) 29'; Novak 72' (pen.); Banks (yellow card) 80'	Stadium: Weston Homes Community Stadium; Attendance: 6,167; Referee: (England) Lee Swabey

20 February 2016 32	Chesterfield	3–1	Crewe Alexandra	Chesterfield
15:00 GMT	Ebanks-Blake 7'; Novak 12'; Dimaio 56'	Report	Jones (yellow card) 20'; Bakayogo 27'; Guthrie (yellow card) 87'	Stadium: Proact Stadium; Attendance: 6,264; Referee: Gavin Ward

27 February 2016 33	Gillingham	1–2	Chesterfield	Gillingham, Kent
15:00 GMT	Ehmer (yellow card) 13'; Jackson (yellow card) 26'; Osadebe 80'	Report	Ebanks-Blake 36'; Dimaio (yellow card) 36'; Novak 45'; O'Shea (yellow card) 90'	Stadium: Priestfield Stadium; Attendance: 6,012; Referee: Kevin Johnson

1 March 2016 34	Chesterfield	1–1	Blackpool	Chesterfield
19:45 GMT	o'Shea 57'	Report	Potts 57'; Ferguson (yellow card) 18' (yellow-red card); Aldred (yellow card) 81'	Stadium: Proact Stadium; Attendance: 5,915; Referee: Eddie Ilderton

5 March 2016 35	Southend United	0–1	Chesterfield	Southend-on-Sea
15:00 GMT	Coker (yellow card) 64'	Report	Banks (yellow card) 59'; Dimaio (yellow card) 88'; Novak 89'	Stadium: Roots Hall; Attendance: 7,518; Referee: Darren Drysdale

12 March 2016 36	Chesterfield	1–4	Walsall	Chesterfield
15:00 GMT	O'Connor 19' (o.g.); Banks (yellow card) 59'; Hird (yellow card) 60'; Donohue (red card) 61'; Novak (yellow card) 68'	Report	Anderson 35' (o.g.); Mantom 57' (yellow card) 60' (goal) 75'; Hiwula 71'	Stadium: Proact Stadium; Attendance: 6,938; Referee: Ross Joyce

19 March 2016 37	Scunthorpe United	1–1	Chesterfield	Scunthorpe
15:00 GMT	Madden 18'; O'Brien (yellow card) 83'	Report	O'Neil (yellow card) 55'; Campbell-Ryce 60'	Stadium: Glanford Park; Attendance: 3,871; Referee: Keith Hill

26 March 2016 38	Chesterfield	0–0	Fleetwood Town	Chesterfield
15:00 GMT	Novak (yellow card) 10'; Anderson (yellow card) 32'	Report	Ryan (yellow card) 5'; Hunter (yellow card) 17'	Stadium: Proact Stadium; Attendance: 6,435; Referee: Nigel Miller

28 March 2016 39	Oldham Athletic	1–0	Chesterfield	Oldham
15:00 GMT	Jones 78'	Report	Anderson (yellow card) 29'	Stadium: Boundary Park; Attendance: 4,483; Referee: Tony Harrington

2 April 2016 40	Chesterfield	4–2	Port Vale	Chesterfield
15:00 GMT	Campbell-Ryce 47'; Hird 60'; Ariyibi 73' o'Shea 83'	Report	Grant (yellow card) 31'; Leitch-Smith 36'; Duffy (yellow card) 59'; Purkiss (yellow card) 69'; Hooper 70'; Streete (yellow card) 90+2'	Stadium: Proact Stadium; Attendance: 5,917; Referee: Kevin Wright

9 April 2016 41	Barnsley	1–2	Chesterfield	Barnsley
15:00 GMT	Hammill 75' (yellow card) 83'	Report	Novak 57'; Lee (yellow card) 70'; Campbell-Ryce (yellow card) 76' (yellow-red card); Banks 81'	Stadium: Oakwell; Attendance: 10,645; Referee: Neil Swarbrick

16 April 2016 42	Chesterfield	0–3	Sheffield United	Chesterfield
13:00 GMT	Liddle (yellow card) 13'	Report	Baptiste 4'; Adams 35'; Sharp 59'	Stadium: Proact Stadium; Attendance: 9,402; Referee: Graham Scott (referee)

19 April 2016 43	Chesterfield	1–1	Doncaster Rovers	Chesterfield
19:45 GMT	Ariyibi 18'; Novak (yellow card) 88'	Report	Rowe 6'; Chaplow (yellow card) 81'; Lund (yellow card) 88'	Stadium: Proact Stadium; Attendance: 6,461; Referee: Jeremy Simpson

23 April 2016 44	Swindon Town	1–0	Chesterfield	Swindon
15:00 GMT	Kasim 77'	Report	Herd (yellow card) 34'; Raglan (yellow card) 43' (yellow-red card)	Stadium: County Ground; Attendance: 7,015; Referee: Trevor Kettle

30 April 2016 45	Chesterfield	3–0	Bury	Chesterfield
15:00 GMT	O'Shea 29' (pen.); Novak 45+2'; Gardener 71'	Report	Jones (yellow card) 25'; Bolger (yellow card) 29'; Pugh (yellow card) 32'; Mayor (yellow card) 49'; Lowe (yellow card) 55'	Stadium: Proact Stadium; Attendance: 7,232; Referee: Chris Sarginson

8 May 2016 46	Bradford City	2–0	Chesterfield	Bradford
12:30 GMT	Evans 7'; Clarke 87'	Report	Raglan (yellow card) 65'; Hird (red card) 67'; Banks (yellow card) 79'	Stadium: Coral Windows Stadium; Attendance: 20,807; Referee: David Webb

=== FA Cup ===
9 November 2015 First round	F.C. United of Manchester	1–4	Chesterfield	Moston, Manchester
19:45 GMT	Ashworth 90+1'	Report	Ariyibi 7'; Novak 12'; Simons 68'; Banks 87'	Stadium: Broadhurst Park; Attendance: 2,916; Referee: Oliver Langford

5 December 2015 Second round	Chesterfield	1–1	Walsall	Chesterfield
15:00 GMT	Morsy 90+3'	Report	Demetriou 19'	Stadium: Proact Stadium; Attendance: 4,126; Referee: Richard Clark

15 December 2015 Second round replay	Walsall	0–0 (5–3 p)	Chesterfield	Walsall
19:45 GMT		Report		Stadium: Bescot Stadium; Attendance: 2,953; Referee: Charles Breakspear
	Penalties
	Sawyers (penalty scored); Demetriou (penalty scored); Evans (penalty scored); Lalkovič (penalty scored); Downing (penalty scored)		O'Shea (penalty scored); Morsy (penalty missed); Novak (penalty scored); O'Neil (penalty scored)

=== League Cup ===
On 16 June 2015, the first round draw was made, Chesterfield were drawn away against Carlisle United.

11 August 2015 First round	Carlisle United	3–1 (a.e.t.)	Chesterfield	Carlisle
19:45 BST	Ibehre 75', 108'; Osei 120'	Report	Dieseruvwe 84'	Stadium: Brunton Park; Attendance: 2,950; Referee: Seb Stockbridge

=== Football League Trophy ===
On 5 September 2015, the second round draw was shown live on Soccer AM and drawn by Charlie Austin and Ed Skrein. Chesterfield were drawn against Rochdale.

6 October 2015 Second round	Rochdale	2–1	Chesterfield	Rochdale
19:45 BST	Tanser 18'; Alessandra 66'	Summary	Eastham 65' (o.g.)	Stadium: Spotland; Attendance: 1,042
