= Gboly Ariyibi =

American soccer player (born 1995)

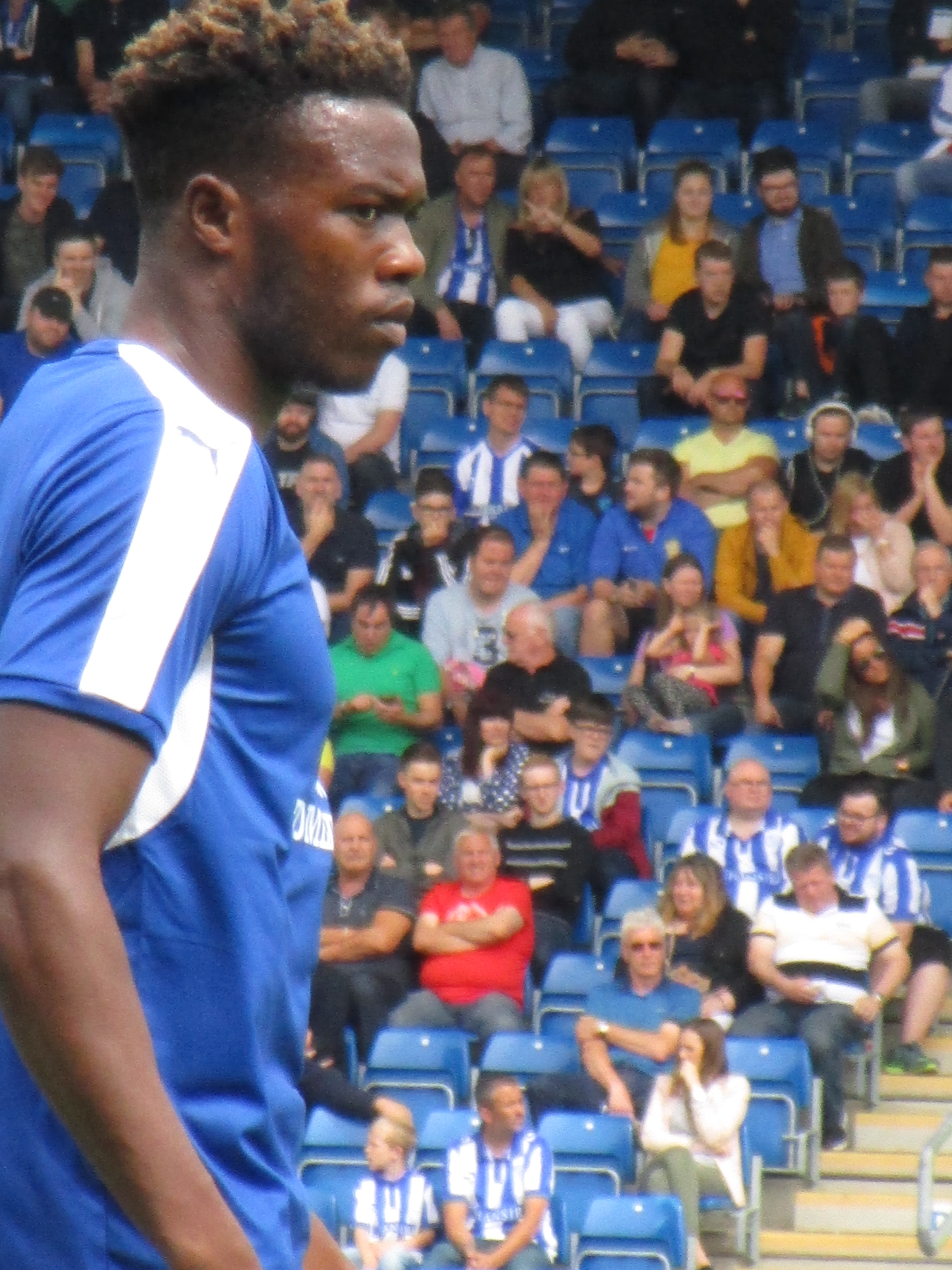
- Ariyibi with Chesterfield in 2016

Personal information
- Full name: Omogbolahan Gregory Ariyibi
- Date of birth: January 18, 1995 (age 31)
- Place of birth: Arlington, Virginia, United States
- Height: 6 ft 0 in (1.83 m)
- Position: Winger

Youth career
- 2005–2013: Southampton

Senior career*
Years	Team	Apps	(Gls)
2013–2014	Leeds United	2	(0)
2014	→ Tranmere Rovers (loan)	2	(0)
2014–2017	Chesterfield	83	(3)
2017–2019	Nottingham Forest	0	(0)
2017–2018	→ Milton Keynes Dons (loan)	22	(3)
2018	→ Northampton Town (loan)	12	(0)
2019	→ Motherwell (loan)	17	(2)
2019–2021	Panetolikos	48	(5)
2021–2023	MKE Ankaragücü	40	(3)
2023–2024	Ankara Keçiörengücü	24	(1)
2025	Boavista	11	(0)
2025–2026	PAS Giannina	14	(3)
2026–	Radnički Niš	19	(2)

International career
2014	United States U20	1	(0)
2015	United States U23	4	(1)
- * Club domestic league appearances and goals as of 21 November 2026

Omogbolahan Gregory "Gboly" Ariyibi (born January 18, 1995) is an American professional soccer player who plays as a winger.

Ariyibi has previously been capped by the United States under-20 and under-23 national teams.

== Early life ==
Born in Arlington, Virginia, United States, to Nigerian parents, Ariyibi moved to England when he was two months old and resided in London before spending a short period of time living in Nigeria. Ariyibi later moved back to England and settled in Oxford. Ariyibi considers Oxford as his home town.

== Club career ==
=== Southampton ===
Ariyibi started his youth career at English club Southampton in 2005 after being spotted playing for Oxford youth side Quarry Rovers. He came through the youth ranks with future first team regulars Luke Shaw and James Ward-Prowse. Ariyibi progressed through to the Under 21s team. He was named as one of Southampton's home-grown Under 21 players for the 2012–13 season in the official squad list.

After being released by Southampton, with Mauricio Pochettino deciding against offering Ariyibi a permanent contract, Ariyibi joined several league clubs on trial including Bolton Wanderers. He also joined UK Football Finder FC to help in enlisting a club.

=== Leeds United ===
On December 11, 2013, Ariyibi signed for Leeds United until the end of the season after a short trial spell. Upon signing for Leeds, manager Brian McDermott described Ariybi as an exciting player, very, very quick. He's a great lad too.

After suffering an injury during the club's development-squad game against Coventry City, He was then given squad number 27 shirt and on Boxing Day 2013 he was named as an unused substitute against Blackpool. On December 29, 2013, Ariybi made his Leeds United debut coming on as a second-half substitute against Nottingham Forest. He then made his second appearance for the side on January 1, 2014, against Blackburn Rovers, but this time made his first start before coming off at half time, in a 2–1 loss.

On March 25, 2014, Ariyibi joined Tranmere Rovers on loan until the end of the season. Ariyibi made his Tranmere Rovers debut on the same day, where he came on as a substitute for James Wallace in the 42nd minutes, in a 2–1 loss against Swindon Town. His second appearance came four days later against Carlisle United, again coming on a second-half substitute, in a 0–0 draw. However, with two appearances for the side, Ariyibi suffered an injury and didn't play again for the rest of the season. At the end of the season, on May 16, 2014, Ariyibi was released by Leeds United.

=== Chesterfield ===
After leaving Leeds United, Ariyibi went on trial at newly promoted Premier League side Burnley in mid-July 2014. Eventually, on August 29, 2014, Ariyibi joined Football League One side Chesterfield on a 12-month contract after turning down a deal at Premier League club Burnley.

Ariyibi made his Chesterfield debut on September 13, 2014, coming on as a late substitute, in a 1–0 loss against Scunthorpe United. However, Ariyibi struggled to regain his first team there at Chesterfield, due to being on the substitute bench and his own injury concern. By February 2015, he began to get more playing time for the side. Ariyibi then provided a double brace on February 28, 2015, in a 3–0 win over Fleetwood Town. His form soon earned him a new contract, keeping him until 2017. A week later, Ariyibi scored his first Chesterfield goal on March 14, 2015, in a 3–2 loss against Coventry City. Having become a first team regular for the rest of the season, Ariyibi finished his first season, making nineteen appearances and scoring once in all competitions.

In the 2015–16 season, Ariyibi's first opportunities began to increase following the departure of Jimmy Ryan, Sam Clucas, Tendayi Darikwa and Gary Roberts. Ariyibi appeared in the first nine league matches until he missed three matches between September 29, 2015, and October 10, 2015, due to international commitment. Weeks after returning to the first team from international commitment, Ariyibi then scored his first goal of the season, in a 4–1 win over F.C. United of Manchester in the first round of FA Cup. In the first match of 2016, Ariyibi set up two goals in a 7–1 win over Shrewsbury Town. It wasn't until on April 2, 2016, when he scored his first goal, as well as, setting up two goals, in a 4–2 win over Port Vale. This was followed up by setting up two goals, in a 2–1 win over Barnsley on April 9, 2016. Two weeks later on April 19, 2016, Ariyibi scored again, in a 1–1 draw against Doncaster Rovers. At the end of the 2015–16 season, Ariyibi went on to make forty-one appearances and scoring three times in all competitions.

In the 2016–17 season, Ariyibi's performance attracted interest from clubs, such as Reading taking interest in him. By the end of transfer window, Ariyibi stayed at the club despite rejecting a new contract from the club after they turned down bids from Championship clubs. In response to the list, Ariyibi denied claims that he requested a transfer move. Despite this, Ariyibi continued to be in the first team and then set up one of the goals, in a 3–1 win over Swindon Town on August 14, 2016. After the match, manager Danny Wilson praised his performance, stating that he's getting better and better. Up until his departure to Nottingham Forest, Ariyibi was an ever-present player since the start of the 2016–17 season.

=== Nottingham Forest ===
On January 31, 2017, Ariyibi signed for Championship club and former European Champions Nottingham Forest for an undisclosed fee. Despite impressing for the club's under-23s, Ariyibi failed to make a single appearance for the club's first-team before the end of the season under Gary Brazil, who had signed him as caretaker-manager, or Mark Warburton, Brazil's permanent successor.

On July 17, 2017, Ariyibi signed on a season long loan to Milton Keynes Dons, and scored his first goal for the club on August 8, 2017, in a 1–0 EFL Cup first round away win over Forest Green Rovers. After making 28 appearances for Milton Keynes Dons, his loan was terminated in January 2018. Shortly after, Aribiyi joined Northampton Town on loan for the remainder of the season. on April 8, 2018, Aribiyi's loan was cut short due to injury.

On January 7, 2019, Ariyibi signed on loan with Motherwell for the remainder of the 2018–19 season.

=== Panetolikos ===
On September 1, 2019, Ariyibi joined Super League Greece side Panetolikos for a two-year deal for an undisclosed fee. On November 9, 2019, helped his club to side got back on level terms (2–2) as he deflected strike beating Nikos Melissas, in a thrilling 3–2 away loss against Volos. It was his first goal with the club in all competitions.

After a spell in Portugal with Boavista, Ariyibi joined Super League Greece 2 side PAS Giannina on a free transfer.

In January 2026, Ariyibi joined Serbian SuperLiga side Radnički Niš.

== International career ==
Ariyibi was born in the United States but is also eligible to play for Nigeria through his parents and England through upbringing. Ariybi stated in 2013 that he wanted to break into the United States youth setup.

In September 2014, Ariyibi was called up by United States under-20 team to face against Argentina U20. Ariyibi went on to make one appearance for United States U20 side. In August 2015, Ariyibi was then called up by the United States under-23 team. He made his United States U23 side debut, coming on as a late substitute in a 1–0 loss against England U21. Then, in a match against Qatar under-23 team on September 8, 2015, Ariyibi scored his first international goal.

== Career statistics ==
As of match played March 7, 2021

Appearances and goals by club, season and competition
Club	Season	League			FA Cup		League Cup		Other		Total	
Club	Season	Division	Apps	Goals	Apps	Goals	Apps	Goals	Apps	Goals	Apps	Goals
Leeds United	2013–14	Championship	2	0	0	0	0	0	0	0	2	0
Tranmere Rovers (loan)	2013–14	League One	2	0	—		—		0	0	2	0
Chesterfield	2014–15	League One	17	1	0	0	0	0	2 (Note: One appearances in the Football League Trophy and one in the League One play-offs)	0	19	1
Chesterfield	2015–16	League One	38	2	2	1	1	0	0	0	41	3
Chesterfield	2016–17	League One	28	0	2	0	1	0	5	0	36	0
Chesterfield	Total		83	3	4	1	2	0	7	0	96	4
Nottingham Forest	2016–17	Championship	0	0	0	0	0	0	—		0	0
Nottingham Forest	2017–18	Championship	0	0	—		—		—		0	0
Nottingham Forest	2018–19	Championship	0	0	0	0	0	0	—		0	0
Nottingham Forest	Total		0	0	0	0	0	0	—		0	0
Milton Keynes Dons (loan)	2017–18	League One	22	3	1	0	2	1	3 (Note: Appearances in the EFL Trophy)	3	28	7
Northampton Town (loan)	2017–18	League One	12	0	—		—		—		12	0
Motherwell (loan)	2018–19	Scottish Premiership	17	2	1	0	—		—		18	2
Panetolikos	2019–20	Super League Greece	19	1	1	0	—		—		20	1
Panetolikos	2020–21	Super League Greece	23	4	2	0	—		—		26	4
Career total			180	13	8	1	4	1	10	3	204	18
