= Jake Orrell =

English footballer

Personal information
- Date of birth: 17 July 1997 (age 29)
- Place of birth: Sunderland, England
- Position: Forward

Team information
- Current team: Consett

Youth career
- 2011–2015: Sunderland

Senior career*
Years	Team	Apps	(Gls)
2015	Gateshead	6	(0)
2015–2016	Chesterfield	2	(0)
2016	→ Matlock Town (loan)	4	(0)
2016–2017	Hartlepool United	0	(0)
2017	→ Spennymoor Town (loan)	0	(0)
2017	Spennymoor Town	9	(0)
2018–2019	Newcastle Benfield		
2019	Blyth Spartans	10	(0)
2019–	Consett	105	(20)
- * Club domestic league appearances and goals as of 12:33, 29 October 2023 (UTC)

Jake Orrell (born 17 July 1997) is an English footballer who plays for Consett.

== Career ==
=== Gateshead ===
Orrell began his career at Sunderland's youth academy before joining Gateshead in January 2015. He made six substitute appearances for Gateshead towards the end of the 2014–15 season.

=== Chesterfield ===
He went on trial at Chesterfield in the summer of 2015 and was successful in earning a professional contract. He made his Chesterfield debut on 11 August 2015 in a 3–1 League Cup defeat against Carlisle United. On 22 January 2016, Orrell went on loan to Matlock Town and made his debut the following day as a substitute in a 2–1 win over Hyde United. His loan was extended for a further month in February before being recalled by Chesterfield on 17 March. On 28 March 2016, Orrell made his Football League debut as an 83rd-minute substitute in Chesterfield's 1–0 defeat at Oldham Athletic.

=== Hartlepool United ===
On 7 June 2016 Orrell joined Hartlepool United on a free transfer. Orell was loaned out to Spennymoor Town in one month on 17 February 2017. The deal got cancelled on 1 March 2017 after issues with FA clearance.

=== Spennymoor ===
However, he joined Spennymoor in July, but got his contract terminated by mutual consent on 25 October 2017.

=== Blyth Spartans ===
On 5 June 2019, Orrell joined Blyth Spartans.

=== Consett ===
He left the club on 27 September 2019, and two days later, he signed for Consett AFC.

== Career statistics ==
As of match played 28 March 2016

Club statistics
Club	Season	League			FA Cup		League Cup		Other		Total	
Club	Season	Division	Apps	Goals	Apps	Goals	Apps	Goals	Apps	Goals	Apps	Goals
Gateshead	2014–15	Conference Premier	6	0	0	0	0	0	0	0	6	0
Chesterfield	2015–16	League One	1	0	0	0	1	0	1	0	3	0
Matlock Town	2015–16	NPL Premier Division	4	0	0	0	0	0	0	0	4	0
Career total			11	0	0	0	1	0	1	0	13	0
