= Joe Fryer (footballer) =

English footballer (born 1995)

Personal information
- Full name: Joseph Luke Fryer
- Date of birth: 14 November 1995 (age 30)
- Place of birth: Chester-le-Street, England
- Position: Goalkeeper

Youth career
- –2016: Middlesbrough

Senior career*
Years	Team	Apps	(Gls)
2016–2020	Middlesbrough	0	(0)
2017	→ Hartlepool United (loan)	14	(0)
2017–2018	→ Stevenage (loan)	28	(0)
2018–2019	→ Carlisle United (loan)	5	(0)
2020–2021	Swindon Town	2	(0)
Total		49	(0)
- * Club domestic league appearances and goals as of 17:02, 7 January 2021 (UTC)

Joseph Luke Fryer (born 14 November 1995) is an English retired professional footballer who played as a goalkeeper.

== Career ==
Fryer began his career with Middlesbrough at U-15 level.

On 26 January 2017, Fryer moved on loan to Hartlepool United. He would make his league debut in a 3–0 defeat at Luton Town on 14 February 2017, going on to make a further 13 appearances and keeping 2 clean sheets for the League Two outfit that season.

On 30 June 2017, Middlesbrough announced that Fryer would be joining League Two side Stevenage on loan for the 2017–18 season. He would make his league debut for Stevenage in a 3–3 draw with Newport County, going on to make 32 appearances in all competitions and keeping 6 clean sheets.

On 28 June 2018, Fryer headed out on loan to League Two side Carlisle United for the 2018–19 season. In a game against Crewe whilst on loan Joe suffered a double leg break which would lead him to be initially hospitalized. His loan spell was ended.

On 10 September 2020, Fryer joined Swindon Town on a short term deal until January 2021 following a successful trial On 7 January 2021, Swindon Town confirmed that Fryer would not be offered a contract extension and that he had left the club.

On 24 November 2022, Middlesbrough announced that Fryer had rejoined the club as an Academy goalkeeping coach following his retirement as a player.

== Career statistics ==
Appearances and goals by club, season and competition
Club	Season	League			FA Cup		League Cup		Other		Total	
Club	Season	Division	Apps	Goals	Apps	Goals	Apps	Goals	Apps	Goals	Apps	Goals
Middlesbrough	2016–17	Premier League	0	0	0	0	0	0	—		0	0
Middlesbrough	2017–18	Championship	0	0	0	0	0	0	—		0	0
Middlesbrough	2018–19	Championship	0	0	0	0	0	0	—		0	0
Middlesbrough	2019–20	Championship	0	0	0	0	0	0	—		0	0
Middlesbrough	Total		0	0	0	0	0	0	—		0	0
Middlesbrough U23	2016–17	—			—		—		3 (Note: Appearance(s) in EFL Trophy)	0	3	0
Hartlepool United (loan)	2016–17	League Two	14	0	0	0	0	0	0	0	14	0
Stevenage (loan)	2017–18	League Two	28	0	2	0	1	0	1	0	32	0
Carlisle United (loan)	2018–19	League Two	5	0	0	0	1	0	0	0	6	0
Swindon Town	2020–21	League One	2	0	0	0	0	0	2	0	4	0
Career total			49	0	2	0	2	0	6	0	59	0
