= 2012 Hartlepool Borough Council election =

2012 UK local government election

Map of the results

The 2012 Hartlepool Borough Council election took place on 3 May 2012 to elect members of Hartlepool Borough Council. There were a number of differences in the composition of wards from the 2011 elections, including the absence of the Bruns, Dyke House, Grange, Greatham, Owton, Park, Rift House, Rossmere, St. Hilda, Stranton, and Throston wards. While the 2011 election had 15 available seats, the 2012 election had 36. Burn Valley, Foggy Furze, Hart, and Seaton wards each had two more seats than the previous year, and De Bruce, Fens & Rossmere, Headland & Harbour, Jesmond, Manor House, Rural West, and Victoria, which did not appear in 2011, all held three seats. The Labour Party once again dominated the election.

== Election result ==
Hartlepool Borough Election, 2012
Party	Seats	Gains	Losses	Net gain/loss	Seats %	Votes %	Votes	+/−
BNP	0				0%	0.46%	230	
Conservative	3				8.58%	13.24%	6,628	
Labour	21				65.72%	46.24%	23,146	
Labour Co-op	0				0%	0%	0	
Liberal Democrats	0				0%	3.31%	1,658	
Putting Hartlepool First	4				14.29%	19.90%	9,960	
UKIP	0				0%	5.01%	2,509	
Independent	5				14.29%	11.82%	5,919	

== Ward results ==
Burn Valley Ward (3 Councillors)
Party	Candidate	Votes	%	±%
Liberal Democrats	Maria Blades	102	2.33%	
Labour	Jonathan Brash	887	20.21%	
Conservative	Michael Corrigan	297	6.78%	
Conservative	John Coward	300	6.84%	
Putting Hartlepool First	Alec Gough	397	9.05%	−23.12%
Labour	Ged Hall	790	17.99%	−49.84%
Liberal Democrats	Jean Kennedy	125	2.85%	
Independent	John Lauderdale	615	14.01%	
Labour	Sarah Maness	579	13.18%	
Conservative	Ray Pocklington	298	6.79%	
Majority		2,256	51.39%	−16.44%
Turnout		4,390	25.90%	−4.20%

De Bruce Ward (3 Councillors)
Party	Candidate	Votes	%	±%
Putting Hartlepool First	Rosie Allison	329	8.84%	
Labour	Rob Cook	741	19.90%	
Labour	Sheila Griffin	875	23.49%	
Conservative	Suzzi McKenzie	140	3.76%	
Liberal Democrats	Michelle Plant	191	5.13%	
Liberal Democrats	Barry Rayner	151	4.06%	
Labour	Sylvia Tempest	682	18.31%	
UKIP	Ronnie Whitlock	247	6.64%	
Liberal Democrats	Edna Wright	369	9.91%	
Majority		2,298	61.70%	
Turnout		3,725	24.70%	

Fens & Rossmere Ward (3 Councillors)
Party	Candidate	Votes	%	±%
Labour	Allan Barclay	693	10.99%	
Putting Hartlepool First	Steve Gibbon	1,023	16.22%	
Labour	Trisha Lawton	716	11.35%	
Putting Hartlepool First	Alison Lilley	933	14.79%	
Putting Hartlepool First	Geoff Lilley	1,006	15.95%	
Conservative	Mike Ludgate	90	1.43%	
Labour	Ann Marshall	722	11.45%	
Independent	Angela McKie	117	1.86%	
Liberal Democrats	Elizabeth Parkinson	202	3.21%	
UKIP	Dave Pascoe	375	5.95%	
Liberal Democrats	Arthur Preece	196	3.11%	
Conservative	Bill Reeve	135	2.14%	
Conservative	Helen Wells	101	1.61%	
Majority		2,962	46.95%	
Turnout		6,309	32.60%	

Foggy Furze Ward (3 Councillors)
Party	Candidate	Votes	%	±%
Labour	Christopher Akers-Belcher	895	21.85%	
Putting Hartlepool First	Fred Corbett	512	12.50%	
Labour	Kevin Cranney	780	19.04%	
UKIP	Phil Fenn	377	9.21%	
Conservative	Dennis Loynes	223	5.45%	
Liberal Democrats	Pat Rayner	148	3.61%	
Putting Hartlepool First	John Ringwood	427	10.43%	
Labour	Kaylee Sirs	654	15.97%	−45.16%
Majority		2,410	58.83%	−2.30%
Turnout		4,097	26.20%	−2%

Hart Ward (3 Councillors)
Party	Candidate	Votes	%	±%
Independent	Bob Addison	368	8.68%	−21.93%
Putting Hartlepool First	Sandra Allison	266	6.28%	
Labour	Paul Beck	571	13.47%	
Independent	Christine Blakey	333	8.68%	
Labour	Moss Boddy	522	12.31%	
Independent	Keith Fisher	532	12.55%	
UKIP	Tom Hind	262	6.18%	
Conservative	Shane Moore	417	9.84%	
Independent	David Nin	257	6.06%	
Labour	Jean Robinson	713	16.82%	−30.37%
Majority		1,806	42.59%	−4.60%
Turnout		4,241	28%	−6.90%

Headland & Harbour Ward (3 Councillors)
Party	Candidate	Votes	%	±%
Labour	Jim Ainslie	763	19.62%	
Putting Hartlepool First	Stephen Allison	525	13.50%	
Conservative	Christopher Broadbent	120	3.09%	
Putting Hartlepool First	Kate Erskine	465	11.96%	
Labour	Peter Jackson	647	16.64%	
Putting Hartlepool First	Steve Latimer	484	12.45%	
Conservative	Andy Loynes	84	2.16%	
Labour	Robbie Payne	713	18.34%	
Conservative	David Young	88	2.27%	
Majority		2,123	54.59%	
Turnout		3,889	25.40%	

Jesmond Ward (3 Councillors)
Party	Candidate	Votes	%	±%
Conservative	Reuben Atkinson	298	9.73%	
Putting Hartlepool First	Keith Dawkins	687	22.43%	
Labour	Mary Fleet	762	24.88%	
Labour	Linda Shields	680	22.21%	
Labour	Stephen Thomas	636	20.77%	
Majority		2,078	67.85%	
Turnout		3,063	23.20%	

Manor House Ward (3 Councillors)
Party	Candidate	Votes	%	±%
Labour	Stephen Akers-Belcher	906	25.07%	
BNP	Ronnie Bage	230	6.37%	
UKIP	Peter Davis	289	8%	
Labour	Marjorie James	808	22.36%	
Conservative	Mandy Loynes	105	2.91%	
Conservative	Elizabeth Smith	79	2.19%	
Putting Hartlepool First	Mick Stevens	305	8.44%	
Conservative	Jayne Wells	70	1.94%	
Labour	Angie Wilcox	822	22.75%	
Majority		2,536	70.18%	
Turnout		3,614	20.30%	

Rural West Ward (3 Councillors)
Party	Candidate	Votes	%	±%
Labour	Les Coverdale	369	6.63%	
Putting Hartlepool First	Andrew Gough	416	7.47%	
Conservative	Brenda Loynes	1,007	18.08%	
Independent	Mike McKie	422	7.58%	
Conservative	George Morris	1,022	18.35%	
Labour	Robert Steel	379	6.81%	
Labour	Ken Thompson	366	6.58%	
Conservative	Ray Wells	1,039	18.66%	
UKIP	Eric Wilson	550	9.88%	
Majority		3,068	55.09%	
Turnout		5,570	35%	

Seaton Ward (3 Councillors)
Party	Candidate	Votes	%	±%
Putting Hartlepool First	Terry Allen	172	3.81%	
Putting Hartlepool First	Kelly Atkinson	328	7.26%	
Labour	Sandra Belcher	274	6.07%	
Independent	Cath Hill	769	17.02%	−32.96%
Labour	John Maxwell	287	6.36%	
Conservative	Jean McKenna	158	3.50%	
Labour	Stuart Shields	237	5.24%	−17.63%
UKIP	George Springer	243	5.38%	
Independent	Paul Thompson	883	19.54%	
Independent	Mike Turner	1,168	25.85%	
Majority		2,820	62.41%	+12.43%
Turnout		4,519	27.70%	−7.70%

Victoria Ward (3 Councillors)
Party	Candidate	Votes	%	±%
Conservative	Amanda Campbell	146	3.73%	
Labour	Pamela Hargreaves	745	19.01%	
UKIP	Kath Hill	166	4.24%	
Conservative	Kelvin Mayson	113	2.89%	
Putting Hartlepool First	Paul Mitchinson	364	9.29%	
Labour	Carl Richardson	737	18.81%	
Labour	Chris Simmons	753	19.22%	
Putting Hartlepool First	Maaija Sinclair	312	7.97%	
Independent	Jane Shaw	87	2.22%	
Liberal Democrats	Margaret Sneddon	77	1.97%	
Putting Hartlepool First	Barry Thompson	322	8.22%	
Liberal Democrats	Jim Tighe	97	2.48%	
Majority		2,235	57.03%	
Turnout		3,919	23.30%	
