= Putting Hartlepool First =

- Leader: James Black
- Chairman: David Riddle
- Founded: 28 September 2011
- Dissolved: 10 May 2019
- Hartlepool Borough Council: 0 / 32

Website
- www.puttinghartlepoolfirst.co.uk

Putting Hartlepool First was a localist political party based in the English town of Hartlepool. It was officially registered with the Electoral Commission as Hartlepool Independents - Putting Hartlepool First.

The party was registered in 2011. In 2017, it had three councillors on Hartlepool Borough Council. The party did not operate a whip, leaving its councillors "free to vote based on their own knowledge and experience."

As of 2019, the party had no representation on the council. The party de-registered the same year.
