= 1995–96 Grimsby Town F.C. season =

Grimsby Town
1995–96 season
- Chairman: Bill Carr
- Manager: Brian Laws (player-manager)
- Stadium: Blundell Park
- First Division: 17th
- FA Cup: Fifth round
- League Cup: Second round
- Top goalscorer: Livingstone (11)
- Average home league attendance: 5,865
Home colours

During the 1995–96 English football season, Grimsby Town F.C. competed in the Football League First Division.

== Transfers ==
=== Transfers in ===
Date	Pos	Player	Transferred from	Fee	Ref
12 June 1995	CM	(England) Nicky Southall	(England) Hartlepool United	£40,000	
19 September 1995	CM	(Scotland) Johnny Walker	(Scotland) Clydebank	Free transfer	
29 September 1995	FW	(Italy) Ivano Bonetti	(Italy) Torino	Free transfer	
17 October 1995	FW	(England) Jamie Forrester	(England) Leeds United	Free transfer	
20 December 1995	GK	(England) John Burridge	(England) Darlington	Free transfer	
9 March 1995	CB	(Italy) Enzo Gambaro	(England) Bolton Wanderers	Free transfer	
11 March 1996	CB	(England) Richard Smith	(England) Leicester City	£50,000	
28 March 1996	LB	(England) Tony Gallimore	(England) Carlisle United	£125,000	

=== Loans in ===
Date	Pos	Player	Transferred from	Date Until	Ref
16 August 1995	FW	(England) Paul Jewell	(England) Bradford City	18 October 1995	
30 January 1996	CM	(England) Peter Butler	(England) Notts County	27 March 1996	
2 February 1996	CB	(England) Vance Warner	(England) Nottingham Forest	2 March 1996	
28 March 1996	FW	(England) Mark Flatts	(England) Arsenal	31 May 1996	

=== Transfers out ===
Date	Pos	Player	Transferred to	Fee	Ref
8 August 1995	CM	(England) Dave Gilbert	(England) West Bromwich Albion	£50,000	
1 January 1996	GK	(England) John Burridge	(England) Gateshead	Free Transfer	
28 March 1996	LB	(England) Gary Croft	(England) Blackburn Rovers	£1,000.000	

== Season summary ==
In the 1995–96 season, Grimsby had a disappointing campaign and Laws' initially successful managerial reign deteriorated after he clashed with Grimsby player Ivano Bonetti. Laws reportedly threw a plate of chicken wings at the Italian following a 3–2 defeat at Luton Town in February 1996 and caused the popular player to leave the club at the end of the season. Grimsby finished the season in 17th place and were in the battle to avoid relegation right up to the penultimate game of the season.

== Final league table ==
Pos	Team	Pld	W	D	L	GF	GA	GD	Pts
15	Birmingham City	46	15	13	18	61	64	−3	58
16	Norwich City	46	14	15	17	59	55	+4	57
17	Grimsby Town	46	14	14	18	55	69	−14	56
18	Oldham Athletic	46	14	14	18	54	50	+4	56
19	Reading	46	13	17	16	54	63	−9	56

Rules for classification: 1) Points; 2) Goals scored; 3) Goal difference

== Results ==
Grimsby Town's score comes first

=== Legend ===
Win	Draw	Loss

=== Football League First Division ===
Date	Opponent	Venue	Result	Attendance	Scorers
12 August 1995	Millwall	A	1–2	8,546	Livingstone
19 August 1995	Portsmouth	H	2–1	4,515	Laws, Croft
26 August 1995	Derby County	A	1–1	10,564	Shakespeare (pen)
29 August 1995	Luton Town	H	0–0	4,289	
2 September 1995	Watford	H	0–0	3,993	
9 September 1995	Wolverhampton Wanderers	A	1–4	23,656	Groves
12 September 1995	Reading	A	2–0	7,283	Woods (2)
17 September 1995	Port Vale	H	1–0	4,066	Livingstone
23 September 1995	Norwich City	H	2–2	5,901	Childs, Southall
30 September 1995	Southend United	A	0–1	4,979	
7 October 1995	Charlton Athletic	A	1–0	8,997	Jewell
14 October 1995	Oldham Athletic	H	1–1	5,830	Dobbin
21 October 1995	Birmingham City	A	1–3	16,455	Woods
28 October 1995	Stoke City	H	1–0	5,683	Groves
4 November 1995	Ipswich Town	A	2–2	10,250	Dobbin, Woods
11 November 1995	Barnsley	H	3–1	6,166	Lever, Livingstone, de Zeeuw (own goal)
18 November 1995	West Bromwich Albion	H	1–0	8,155	Bonetti
21 November 1995	Sheffield United	A	2–1	9,884	Southall, Childs
25 November 1995	Tranmere Rovers	A	1–0	7,500	Bonetti
2 December 1995	Charlton Athletic	H	1–2	6,881	Groves
9 December 1995	Norwich City	A	2–2	13,283	Groves, Livingstone
16 December 1995	Southend United	H	1–1	5,269	Forrester
23 December 1995	Leicester City	H	2–2	7,713	Dobbin, Walsh (own goal)
1 January 1996	Huddersfield Town	H	1–1	7,524	Livingstone
13 January 1996	Portsmouth	A	1–3	6,958	Groves
20 January 1996	Millwall	H	1–2	5,218	Livingstone
24 January 1996	Sunderland	A	0–1	14,517	
3 February 1996	Derby County	H	1–1	7,818	Bonetti
10 February 1996	Luton Town	A	2–3	7,158	Forrester (2)
17 February 1996	Reading	H	0–0	7,041	
3 March 1996	Sunderland	H	0–4	5,767	
5 March 1996	Crystal Palace	A	0–5	11,548	
9 March 1996	Leicester City	A	1–2	13,784	Livingstone
12 March 1996	Wolverhampton Wanderers	H	3–0	5,565	Shakespeare, Livingstone, Forrester
16 March 1996	Crystal Palace	H	0–2	5,059	
24 March 1996	Huddersfield Town	A	3–1	12,090	Livingstone, Childs, Groves
30 March 1996	Birmingham City	H	2–1	5,475	Groves, Livingstone
2 April 1996	Oldham Athletic	A	0–1	5,037	
6 April 1996	Stoke City	A	2–1	12,524	Groves, Gallimore
8 April 1996	Ipswich Town	H	3–1	5,904	Mendonca (3)
13 April 1996	West Bromwich Albion	A	1–3	16,116	Forrester
16 April 1996	Port Vale	A	0–1	5,796	
20 April 1996	Sheffield United	H	0–2	7,685	
23 April 1996	Watford	A	3–6	8,909	Walker, Groves, Livingstone
27 April 1996	Tranmere Rovers	H	1–1	5,408	Mendonca (pen)
4 May 1996	Barnsley	A	1–1	6,108	McDermott

=== FA Cup ===
Round	Date	Opponent	Venue	Result	Attendance	Goalscorers
Third round	6 January 1996	Luton Town	H	7–1	5,387	Forrester (2), Livingstone (2), Bonetti, Southall, Woods
Fourth round	7 February 1996	West Ham United	A	1–1	22,030	Laws
Fourth round replay	14 February 1996	West Ham United	H	3–0	8,382	Childs, Forrester, Woods
Fifth round	21 February 1996	Chelsea	H	0–0	9,448	
Fifth round replay	28 February 1996	Chelsea	A	1–4	28,545	Groves

=== League Cup ===
Round	Date	Opponent	Venue	Result	Attendance	Goalscorers
Second round first leg	20 September 1995	Birmingham City	A	1–3	7,446	Woods
Second round second leg	3 October 1995	Birmingham City	H	1–1 (lost 2–4 on agg)	3,280	Southall

== Squad ==
Note: Flags indicate national team as defined under FIFA eligibility rules; some limited exceptions apply. Players may hold more than one non-FIFA nationality.

No.	Pos.	Nation	Player
—	GK	(England) ENG	Paul Crichton
—	GK	(England) ENG	Andy Love
—	GK	(England) ENG	Jason Pearcey
—	DF	(England) ENG	Gary Croft
—	DF	(England) ENG	Ashley Fickling
—	DF	(England) ENG	Tony Gallimore
—	DF	(Italy) ITA	Enzo Gambaro
—	DF	(Scotland) SCO	Peter Handyside
—	DF	(England) ENG	Kevin Jobling
—	DF	(England) ENG	Brian Laws (player-manager)
—	DF	(England) ENG	Mark Lever
—	DF	(England) ENG	John McDermott
—	DF	(England) ENG	Jimmy Neil
—	DF	(England) ENG	Graham Rodger
—	DF	(England) ENG	Richard Smith
—	DF	(England) ENG	Vance Warner (on loan from Nottingham Forest)
—	MF	(England) ENG	Peter Butler (on loan from Notts County)

No.	Pos.	Nation	Player
—	MF	(England) ENG	Gary Childs
—	MF	(Scotland) SCO	Jim Dobbin
—	MF	(England) ENG	Mark Flatts (on loan from Arsenal)
—	MF	(England) ENG	Paul Groves
—	MF	(Wales) WAL	John Oster
—	MF	(England) ENG	Craig Shakespeare
—	MF	(England) ENG	Nicky Southall
—	MF	(Scotland) SCO	Johnny Walker
—	MF	(England) ENG	Tommy Watson
—	FW	(Republic of Ireland) IRL	Daryl Clare
—	FW	(Italy) ITA	Ivano Bonetti
—	FW	(England) ENG	Jamie Forrester
—	FW	(England) ENG	Paul Jewell (on loan from Bradford City)
—	FW	(England) ENG	Jack Lester
—	FW	(England) ENG	Steve Livingstone
—	FW	(England) ENG	Clive Mendonca
—	FW	(England) ENG	Neil Woods
