= 1996–97 Grimsby Town F.C. season =

Grimsby Town
1996–97 season
- Chairman: Bill Carr
- Manager: Brian Laws (until 1 November 1996); John Cockerill (caretaker); Kenny Swain (caretaker)
- Stadium: Blundell Park
- Division One: 22nd (Relegated)
- FA Cup: Third Round
- League Cup: First Round
- Lincolnshire Senior Cup: Runners Up
- Top goalscorer: League: All: Clive Mendonca (19)
Home colours	Away colours

During the 1996–97 English football season, Grimsby Town competed in the Football League First Division.

== Transfers ==
=== Transfers in ===
Date	Pos	Player	Transferred from	Fee	Ref
11 July 1996	MF	(England) Tommy Widdrington	(England) Southampton	£300,000	
16 July 1996	MF	(Northern Ireland) Kingsley Black	(England) Nottingham Forest	£25,000	
19 July 1996	MF	(England) Darren Wrack	(England) Derby County	£100,000	
16 August 1996	DF	(England) Neil Webb	(England) Nottingham Forest	Free Transfer	
31 August 1996	GK	(England) Andy Quy	(England) Derby County	Free Transfer	

=== Loans in ===
Date	Pos	Player	Transferred from	Date Until	Ref
30 August 1996	DF	(Wales) Paul Trollope	(England) Derby County	1 October 1996	
17 January 1997	MF	(England) Michael Appleton	(England) Manchester United	18 March 1997	
28 January 1997	GK	(England) Alan Miller	(England) Middlesbrough	8 February 1997	
21 March 1997	FW	(England) Jason Lee	(England) Nottingham Forest	31 May 1997	

=== Transfers out ===
Date	Pos	Player	Transferred To	Fee	Ref
31 May 1996	MF	(England) Tommy Watson	Retired	Released	
31 May 1996	DF	(Italy) Enzo Gambaro	(Austria) Sturm Graz	Released	
8 July 1996	MF	(England) Paul Groves	(England) West Bromwich Albion	£600,000	
1 August 1996	MF	(England) Steve Fraser	(England) Lincoln City	Free Transfer	
2 August 1996	MF	(Scotland) Jim Dobbin	(England) Rotherham United	Free Transfer	
9 August 1996	FW	(Italy) Ivano Bonetti	(England) Tranmere Rovers	Free Transfer	
2 October 1996	GK	(England) Paul Crichton	(England) West Bromwich Albion	£250,000	
1 November 1996	DF	(England) Brian Laws	(England) Darlington	Released	
8 November 1996	MF	(Scotland) Johnny Walker	(England) Mansfield Town	£50,000	
21 March 1997	FW	(England) Jamie Forrester	(England) Scunthorpe United	Free Transfer	

=== Loans out ===
Date	Pos	Player	Transferred To	Date Until	Ref
4 October 1996	MF	(England) Jimmy Neil	(England) Grantham	4 November 1996	
17 February 1997	MF	(England) Darren Wrack	(England) Shrewsbury Town	15 March 1997	

== Season summary ==
The Mariners were relegated from Division One. Despite flowing goals from Clive Mendonca and good performances from John Oster and newcomer Kingsley Black, Grimsby failed to save themselves. The club had suffered from the losses of ever-present goalkeeper Paul Crichton and Gary Croft, who made a £1.5 million move to Blackburn Rovers. Manager Brian Laws had been sacked late in 1996; John Cockerill and Kenny Swain both had stints as caretaker during the season. At the end of the season, former manager Alan Buckley, who had taken Grimsby from the Fourth to the old Second Division in his first stint in charge, rejoined the club in an attempt to take Grimsby back to the second tier.

== Kit ==
Italian company Lotto became Grimsby's new kit manufacturers, and introduced a new kit for the season. Europe's Food Town remained kit sponsors.

== League table ==
Pos	Team	Pld	W	D	L	GF	GA	GD	Pts	Qualification or relegation
20	Huddersfield Town	46	13	15	18	48	61	−13	54	
21	Bradford City	46	12	12	22	47	72	−25	48	
22	Grimsby Town (R)	46	11	13	22	59	81	−22	46	Relegation to the Second Division
23	Oldham Athletic (R)	46	10	13	23	51	66	−15	43	Relegation to the Second Division
24	Southend United (R)	46	8	15	23	42	85	−43	39	Relegation to the Second Division

Rules for classification: 1) Points; 2) Goals scored; 3) Goal difference
(R) Relegated

== Squad overview ==
Note: Flags indicate national team as defined under FIFA eligibility rules; some limited exceptions apply. Players may hold more than one non-FIFA nationality.

No.	Pos.	Nation	Player
—	GK	ENG	Paul Crichton (Departed in October 1996)
—	GK	ENG	Jason Pearcey
—	GK	ENG	Andy Love
—	GK	ENG	Alan Miller (on loan from Middlesbrough)
—	GK	ENG	Andy Quy
—	DF	ENG	Danny Butterfield
—	DF	ENG	Ashley Fickling
—	DF	ENG	Tony Gallimore
—	DF	ENG	Joby Gowshall
—	DF	SCO	Peter Handyside
—	DF	ENG	Kevin Jobling
—	DF	ENG	Brian Laws (Departed in November 1996)
—	DF	ENG	Mark Lever (captain)
—	DF	ENG	John McDermott
—	DF	ENG	Jimmy Neil
—	DF	ENG	Graham Rodger
—	DF	ENG	Richard Smith
—	DF	ENG	Neil Webb

No.	Pos.	Nation	Player
—	MF	ENG	Michael Appleton (on loan from Manchester United)
—	MF	NIR	Kingsley Black
—	MF	ENG	Gary Childs
—	MF	ENG	Paul Harsley
—	MF	WAL	John Oster
—	MF	ENG	Craig Shakespeare
—	MF	ENG	Nicky Southall
—	MF	WAL	Paul Trollope (on loan from Derby County)
—	MF	SCO	Johnny Walker (Departed in November 1996)
—	MF	ENG	Tommy Widdrington
—	MF	ENG	Darren Wrack
—	FW	IRL	Daryl Clare
—	FW	ENG	Jamie Forrester (Departed in March 1997)
—	FW	ENG	Jason Lee (on loan from Nottingham Forest)
—	FW	ENG	Jack Lester
—	FW	ENG	Steve Livingstone
—	FW	ENG	Clive Mendonca
—	FW	ENG	Neil Woods
