= 1994–95 Grimsby Town F.C. season =

Grimsby Town
1994–95 season
- Manager: Alan Buckley Until 20 October 1994 Brian Laws (player-manager)
- Stadium: Blundell Park
- First Division: 10th
- FA Cup: Third round
- League Cup: First round

During the 1994–95 English football season, Grimsby Town F.C. competed in the Football League First Division.

== Final league table ==
Pos	Team	Pld	W	D	L	GF	GA	GD	Pts
8	Sheffield United	46	17	17	12	74	55	+19	68
9	Derby County	46	18	12	16	66	51	+15	66
10	Grimsby Town	46	17	14	15	62	56	+6	65
11	Stoke City	46	16	15	15	50	53	−3	63
12	Millwall	46	16	14	16	60	60	0	62

Rules for classification: 1) Points; 2) Goals scored; 3) Goal difference

== Results ==
Grimsby Town's score comes first

=== Legend ===
Win	Draw	Loss

=== Football League First Division ===
Date	Opponent	Venue	Result	Attendance
13 August 1994	Bolton Wanderers	H	3–3	8,393
19 August 1994	Watford	H	0–0	6,324
27 August 1994	Tranmere Rovers	H	3–1	4,087
30 August 1994	Sunderland	A	2–2	15,788
3 September 1994	Derby County	A	1–2	12,027
10 September 1994	Charlton Athletic	A	0–1	3,970
13 September 1994	Port Vale	H	4–1	3,216
17 September 1994	West Bromwich Albion	A	1–1	14,496
24 September 1994	Swindon Town	A	2–3	8,219
1 October 1994	Portsmouth	H	2–0	4,172
8 October 1994	Sheffield United	H	0–0	8,930
15 October 1994	Wolverhampton Wanderers	A	1–2	24,447
22 October 1994	Bristol City	H	1–0	4,024
29 October 1994	Southend United	A	0–0	5,086
1 November 1994	Luton Town	A	2–1	5,839
5 November 1994	Middlesbrough	H	2–1	8,488
12 November 1994	Millwall	H	1–0	5,261
19 November 1994	Stoke City	A	0–3	12,055
26 November 1994	Burnley	H	2–2	7,084
3 December 1994	Bristol City	A	2–1	6,030
10 December 1994	Watford	H	0–0	6,288
17 December 1994	Bolton Wanderers	A	3–3	10,522
26 December 1994	Barnsley	A	1–4	8,669
27 December 1994	Oldham Athletic	H	1–3	6,958
31 December 1994	Reading	A	1–1	8,526
14 January 1995	Southend United	H	4–1	3,915
21 January 1995	Middlesbrough	A	1–1	15,360
28 January 1995	Notts County	H	2–1	5,161
4 February 1995	Millwall	A	0–2	7,397
11 February 1995	Luton Town	H	5–0	4,615
18 February 1995	Burnley	A	2–0	10,511
21 February 1995	Stoke City	H	0–0	6,384
25 February 1995	Portsmouth	A	1–2	8,274
4 March 1995	Swindon Town	H	1–1	4,934
7 March 1995	Derby County	H	0–1	5,310
11 March 1995	Tranmere Rovers	A	0–2	15,810
19 March 1995	Sunderland	H	3–1	5,697
21 March 1995	Charlton Athletic	A	1–2	9,601
25 March 1995	West Bromwich Albion	H	0–2	7,393
1 April 1995	Port Vale	H	2–1	7,150
8 April 1995	Reading	H	1–0	4,519
15 April 1995	Oldham Athletic	A	0–1	6,757
17 April 1995	Barnsley	H	1–0	7,277
22 April 1995	Notts County	A	2–0	5,286
29 April 1995	Wolverhampton Wanderers	H	0–0	10,112
6 May 1995	Sheffield United	A	1–3	14,323

=== FA Cup ===
Round	Date	Opponent	Venue	Result	Attendance
Third round	7 January 1995	Norwich City	H	0–1	11,198

=== League Cup ===
Round	Date	Opponent	Venue	Result	Attendance	Notes
First round first leg	16 August 1994	Bradford City	A	1–2	5,986	
First round second leg	23 August 1994	Bradford City	H	1–2	3,498	Bradford won 4–2 on aggregate

== Squad ==
Note: Flags indicate national team as defined under FIFA eligibility rules; some limited exceptions apply. Players may hold more than one non-FIFA nationality.

No.	Pos.	Nation	Player
—	GK	(England) ENG	Paul Crichton
—	GK	(England) ENG	Nick Colgan
—	GK	(England) ENG	Jason Pearcey
—	DF	(England) ENG	Graham Rodger
—	DF	(England) ENG	Ashley Fickling
—	DF	(England) ENG	Brian Laws (player-manager)
—	DF	(Scotland) SCO	Peter Handyside
—	DF	(Scotland) SCO	Paul Futcher
—	DF	(England) ENG	Mark Lever
—	DF	(England) ENG	Gary Croft
—	DF	(England) ENG	John McDermott
—	DF	(England) ENG	Paul Agnew

No.	Pos.	Nation	Player
—	MF	(England) ENG	Gary Childs
—	MF	(England) ENG	Paul Groves
—	MF	(England) ENG	Dave Gilbert
—	DF	(England) ENG	Kevin Jobling
—	MF	(England) ENG	Craig Shakespeare
—	MF	(Scotland) SCO	Jim Dobbin
—	MF	(England) ENG	Tommy Watson
—	FW	(England) ENG	Jack Lester
—	FW	(England) ENG	Steve Livingstone
—	FW	(England) ENG	Clive Mendonca
—	FW	(England) ENG	Neil Woods
—	FW	(England) ENG	Jamie Forrester (on loan from Leeds United)
