= 1993–94 Grimsby Town F.C. season =

Grimsby Town
1993–94 season
- Manager: Alan Buckley
- Stadium: Blundell Park
- First Division: 17th
- FA Cup: Fourth round
- League Cup: Fourth round
- Anglo-Italian Cup: Qualifying Round

During the 1993–94 English football season, Grimsby Town F.C. competed in the Football League First Division.

== Final league table ==
Pos	Team	Pld	W	D	L	GF	GA	GD	Pts
14	Bolton Wanderers	46	15	14	17	63	64	−1	59
15	Southend United	46	17	8	21	63	67	−4	59
16	Grimsby Town	46	13	20	13	52	47	+5	59
17	Portsmouth	46	15	13	18	52	58	−6	58
18	Barnsley	46	16	7	23	55	67	−12	55

Source: rsssf.com
Rules for classification: 1) Points; 2) Goals scored; 3) Goal difference

== Results ==
Grimsby Town's score comes first

=== Legend ===
Win	Draw	Loss

=== Football League First Division ===
Date	Opponent	Venue	Result	Attendance
14 August 1993	Bolton Wanderers	H	0–0	8,593
21 August 1993	Nottingham Forest	A	3–5	23,225
24 August 1993	Portsmouth	H	1–1	5,259
28 August 1993	Tranmere Rovers	H	2–2	4,793
4 September 1993	Peterborough United	A	2–1	5,962
11 September 1993	Watford	H	2–2	4,783
18 September 1993	Birmingham City	A	1–1	11,302
25 September 1993	Wolverhampton Wanderers	H	2–0	6,310
28 September 1993	Sunderland	A	2–2	15,488
2 October 1993	Oxford United	A	2–2	4,301
9 October 1993	Southend United	H	4–0	4,756
16 October 1993	Stoke City	A	0–1	14,696
23 October 1993	Charlton Athletic	H	0–1	5,118
30 October 1993	Crystal Palace	A	0–1	12,202
2 November 1993	Leicester City	H	0–0	6,346
7 November 1993	Barnsley	A	2–1	5,942
20 November 1993	Derby County	A	1–2	13,498
27 November 1993	Millwall	A	0–1	7,691
4 December 1993	Barnsley	H	2–2	5,283
18 December 1993	Bolton Wanderers	A	1–1	9,431
27 December 1993	Notts County	H	2–2	7,781
29 December 1993	Luton Town	A	1–2	7,234
1 January 1994	Bristol City	H	1–0	5,469
3 January 1994	Middlesbrough	A	0–1	10,441
15 January 1994	Stoke City	H	0–0	8,577
22 January 1994	Southend United	A	2–1	4,367
1 February 1994	West Bromwich Albion	H	2–2	4,740
5 February 1994	Charlton Athletic	A	1–0	7,598
12 February 1994	Crystal Palace	H	1–1	6,302
19 February 1994	Portsmouth	A	1–3	7,794
5 March 1994	Tranmere Rovers	A	2–1	6,454
8 March 1994	Peterborough United	H	3–2	4,504
12 March 1994	Birmingham City	H	1–0	5,405
15 March 1994	Watford	A	3–0	5,109
19 March 1994	Wolverhampton Wanderers	A	0–0	20,224
26 March 1994	Oxford United	H	1–0	5,025
29 March 1994	Middlesbrough	H	1–1	5,709
2 April 1994	Notts County	A	1–2	7,205
4 April 1994	Luton Town	H	2–0	5,542
9 April 1994	Bristol City	A	0–1	5,480
12 April 1994	Sunderland	H	1–0	4,732
16 April 1994	Leicester City	A	1–1	15,859
23 April 1994	Derby County	H	1–1	7,451
30 April 1994	West Bromwich Albion	A	0–1	16,870
3 May 1994	Nottingham Forest	H	0–0	11,930
8 May 1994	Millwall	H	0–0	5,355

=== FA Cup ===
Round	Date	Opponent	Venue	Result	Attendance
Third round	8 January 1994	Wigan Athletic	H	1–0	4,488
Fourth round	29 January 1994	Aston Villa	H	1–2	15,771

=== League Cup ===
Round	Date	Opponent	Venue	Result	Attendance	Notes
Second round first leg	21 September 1993	Hartlepool United	A	3–0	2,353	
Second round second leg	5 October 1993	Hartlepool United	H	2–0	1,385	Grimsby won 5-0 on aggregate
Third round	26 October 1993	Tranmere Rovers	A	1–4	5,204	

=== Anglo-Italian Cup ===
Round	Date	Opponent	Venue	Result	Attendance
Qualifying round	31 August 1993	Middlesbrough	H	2–1	996
Qualifying round	14 September 1993	Barnsley	A	1–2	1,627

== Squad ==
Note: Flags indicate national team as defined under FIFA eligibility rules; some limited exceptions apply. Players may hold more than one non-FIFA nationality.

No.	Pos.	Nation	Player
—	GK	(England) ENG	Paul Crichton
—	DF	(England) ENG	Graham Rodger
—	DF	(Scotland) SCO	Paul Futcher
—	DF	(Scotland) SCO	Peter Handyside
—	DF	(England) ENG	Mark Lever
—	DF	(England) ENG	Gary Croft
—	DF	(England) ENG	Paul Groves
—	DF	(England) ENG	John McDermott
—	DF	(England) ENG	Paul Agnew
—	MF	(England) ENG	Gary Childs
—	MF	(England) ENG	Gary Crosby (on loan from Nottingham Forest)
—	MF	(Scotland) SCO	Jim Dobbin

No.	Pos.	Nation	Player
—	MF	(England) ENG	Tony Ford
—	MF	(England) ENG	Dave Gilbert
—	DF	(England) ENG	Kevin Jobling
—	MF	(England) ENG	Craig Shakespeare
—	MF	(England) ENG	Tommy Watson
—	FW	(England) ENG	Tony Daws
—	FW	(England) ENG	Nigel Jemson
—	FW	(England) ENG	Clive Mendonca
—	FW	(England) ENG	Steve Livingstone
—	FW	(Nigeria) NGA	Chima Okorie
—	FW	(England) ENG	Tony Rees
—	FW	(England) ENG	Neil Woods
