= List of Grimsby Town F.C. seasons =

Grimsby Town Performances from 1892 until 2023

Season by season league and cup results for Grimsby Town F.C.

== Key ==
Key to league record

- Level = Level of the league in the current league system
- Pld = Games played
- W = Games won
- D = Games drawn
- L = Games lost
- GF = Goals for
- GA = Goals against
- GD = Goals difference
- Pts = Points
- Position = Position in the final league table
- Top scorer and number of goals scored shown in bold when he was also top scorer for the division. Number of goals includes goals scored in play-offs.

Key to cup records

- Res = Final reached round
- Rec = Final club record in the form of wins-draws-losses
- PR = Preliminary round
- QR1 (2, etc.) = Qualifying Cup rounds
- G = Group stage
- R1 (2, etc.) = Proper Cup rounds
- QF = Quarter-finalists
- SF = Semi-finalists
- F = Finalists
- A (QF, SF, F) = Area quarter-, semi-, finalists
- W = Winners

== Seasons ==
Year	League	Lvl	Pld	W	D	L	GF	GA	GD	Pts	Position	Leading league scorer		FA Cup		FL Cup		FL Trophy FA Trophy		Average home attendance (Note: Average home attendance = for league games only)
Year	League	Lvl	Pld	W	D	L	GF	GA	GD	Pts	Position	Name	Goals	Res	Rec	Res	Rec	Res	Rec	Average home attendance
1884–85														R4	1-0-1					
1885–86														R3	0-0-1					
1886–87														R2	1-1-1					
1887–88														R4	1-0-1					
1888–89														R2	2-0-1					
1889–90	**Football Alliance**	2	22	12	2	8	58	47	+11	26	**4th of 12**			R2	1-0-1					
1890–91	**Football Alliance**	2	22	11	5	6	43	27	+16	27	**3rd of 12**			QR1	0-0-1					
1891–92	**Football Alliance**	2	22	6	6	10	40	39	+1	16	**10th of 12**			QR3	2-0-1					
Football League Second Division created, the club elected to the newly created division.
1892–93	**Second Division**	2	22	11	1	10	42	41	+1	23	**4th of 12**			R2	2-0-1					2,435
1893–94	**Second Division**	2	28	15	2	11	71	58	+13	32	**5th of 15**			R1	1-0-1					2,800
1894–95	**Second Division**	2	30	18	1	11	79	52	+27	37	**5th of 16**			-						3,530
1895–96	**Second Division**	2	30	20	2	8	82	38	+44	42	**3rd of 16**			R2	3-1-1					3,500
1896–97	**Second Division**	2	30	17	4	9	66	45	+21	38	**3rd of 16**			R1	0-2-1					4,345
1897–98	**Second Division**	2	30	10	4	16	52	62	-10	24	**12th of 16**			R1	0-0-1					3,465
1898–99	**Second Division**	2	34	15	5	14	71	60	+11	35	**10th of 18**			R1	1-1-1					3,545
1899–1900	**Second Division**	2	34	17	6	11	67	46	+21	40	**6th of 18**			R1	1-0-1					3,800
1900–01	**Second Division**	2	34	20	9	5	60	33	+27	49	**1st of 18**; Promoted			INT	0-0-1					5,125
1901–02	**First Division**	1	34	13	6	15	44	60	-16	32	**15th of 18**			R1	0-1-1					5,955
1902–03	**First Division**	1	34	8	9	17	43	62	-19	25	**17th of 18**; Relegated			R2	1-0-1					5,055
1903–04	**Second Division**	2	34	14	8	12	50	49	+1	36	**6th of 18**			R1	1-0-1					4,400
1904–05	**Second Division**	2	34	11	8	15	33	46	-13	30	**13th of 18**			R1	1-0-1					3,875
1905–06	**Second Division**	2	38	15	10	13	46	46	0	40	**8th of 20**			R1	0-0-1					4,230
1906–07	**Second Division**	2	38	16	3	19	57	62	-5	35	**11th of 20**			R1	0-1-1					5,100
1907–08	**Second Division**	2	38	11	8	19	43	71	-28	30	**18th of 20**			QF	3-1-1					4,575
1908–09	**Second Division**	2	38	14	7	17	41	54	-13	35	**13th of 20**			R1	0-0-1					5,235
1909–10	**Second Division**	2	38	9	6	23	50	77	-27	24	**19th of 20**			R1	0-0-1					4,405
The club voted out of the Football League.
1910–11	**Midland League**		38	25	7	6	93	32	+61	57	**1st of 20**			R3	2-0-1					
The club elected to the Football League.
1911–12	**Second Division**	2	38	15	9	14	48	55	-7	39	**9th of 20**			-						5,250
1912–13	**Second Division**	2	38	15	10	13	51	50	+1	40	**7th of 20**			R1	0-0-1					5,790
1913–14	**Second Division**	2	38	13	8	17	42	58	-16	34	**15th of 20**			R1	0-0-1					8,345
1914–15	**Second Division**	2	38	11	9	18	48	76	-28	31	**17th of 20**			R1	0-0-1					5,900
No competitive football was played between 1915 and 1919 due to the World War I.
1919–20	**Second Division**	2	42	10	5	27	34	75	-41	25	**22nd of 22**; Relegated			R1	0-0-1					6,200
1920–21	**Third Division South**	3	42	15	9	18	49	59	-10	39	**13th of 22**; Transferred			R2	2-0-1					9,790
1921–22	**Third Division North**	3	38	21	8	9	72	47	+25	50	**3rd of 20**			R1	2-3-1					8,750
1922–23	**Third Division North**	3	38	14	5	19	55	52	+3	33	**14th of 20**			QR5	0-0-1					8,445
1923–24	**Third Division North**	3	42	14	13	15	49	47	+2	41	**11th of 22**			R1	2-1-1					7,590
1924–25	**Third Division North**	3	42	15	9	18	60	60	0	39	**12th of 22**			QR5	0-0-1					6,315
1925–26	**Third Division North**	3	42	26	9	7	91	40	+51	61	**1st of 22**; Promoted			R3	2-1-1					9,418
1926–27	**Second Division**	2	42	11	12	19	74	91	-17	34	**17th of 22**			R3	2-0-1					12,558
1927–28	**Second Division**	2	42	14	12	16	69	83	-14	40	**11th of 22**			R3	0-0-1					11,237
1928–29	**Second Division**	2	42	24	5	13	82	61	+21	53	**2nd of 22**; Promoted			R3	0-1-1					12,295
1929–30	**First Division**	1	42	15	7	20	73	89	-16	37	**18th of 22**			R3	0-1-1					14,724
1930–31	**First Division**	1	42	17	5	20	82	87	-5	39	**13th of 22**			R5	2-0-1					13,082
1931–32	**First Division**	1	42	13	6	23	67	98	-31	32	**21st of 22**; Relegated			R5	2-0-1					11,968
1932–33	**Second Division**	2	42	14	13	15	79	84	-5	41	**13th of 22**			R4	1-0-1					8,357
1933–34	**Second Division**	2	42	27	5	10	103	59	+44	59	**1st of 22**; Promoted			R4	1-0-1					10,852
1934–35	**First Division**	1	42	17	11	14	78	60	+18	45	**5th of 22**			R3	0-0-1					13,706
1935–36	**First Division**	1	42	17	5	20	65	73	-8	39	**17th of 22**			SF	4-1-1					11,496
1936–37	**First Division**	1	42	17	7	18	86	81	+5	41	**12th of 22**			R5	2-1-1					11,514
1937–38	**First Division**	1	42	13	12	17	51	68	-17	38	**20th of 22**			R3	0-1-1					12,288
1938–39	**First Division**	1	42	16	11	15	61	69	-8	43	**10th of 22**			SF	4-2-1					12,064
No competitive football was played between 1939 and 1946 due to the World War II.
1945–46														R3	0-0-2					
1946–47	**First Division**	1	42	13	12	17	61	82	-21	38	**16th of 22**			R4	1-1-1					16,220
1947–48	**First Division**	1	42	8	6	28	45	111	-66	22	**22nd of 22**; Relegated			R3	0-0-1					16,031
1948–49	**Second Division**	2	42	15	10	17	72	76	-4	40	**11th of 22**			R4	1-0-1					16,602
1949–50	**Second Division**	2	42	16	8	18	74	73	+1	40	**11th of 22**			R4	1-0-1					18,056
1950–51	**Second Division**	2	42	8	12	22	61	95	-34	28	**22nd of 22**; Relegated			R3	0-1-1					15,939
1951–52	**Third Division North**	3	46	29	8	9	96	45	+51	66	**2nd of 24**			R2	1-0-1					14,909
1952–53	**Third Division North**	3	46	21	10	15	75	59	+16	52	**5th of 24**			R3	2-0-1					14,298
1953–54	**Third Division North**	3	46	16	9	21	51	77	-26	41	**17th of 24**			R3	2-2-1					9,578
1954–55	**Third Division North**	3	46	13	8	25	47	78	-31	34	**23rd of 24**			R3	2-0-1					8,261
1955–56	**Third Division North**	3	46	31	6	9	76	29	+47	68	**1st of 24**; Promoted			R3	2-1-1					15,934
1956–57	**Second Division**	2	42	17	5	20	61	62	-1	39	**16th of 22**			R3	0-0-1					15,331
1957–58	**Second Division**	2	42	17	6	19	86	83	+3	40	**13th of 22**			R3	0-0-1					14,166
1958–59	**Second Division**	2	42	9	10	23	62	90	-28	28	**21st of 22**; Relegated			R4	1-1-1					13,108
1959–60	**Third Division**	3	46	18	16	12	87	70	+17	52	**4th of 24**			R2	1-0-1					10,540
1960–61	**Third Division**	3	46	20	10	16	77	69	+8	50	**6th of 24**			R1	0-0-1	R2	0-0-1			9,295
1961–62	**Third Division**	3	46	28	6	12	80	56	+24	62	**2nd of 24**; Promoted			R1	0-0-1	R1	0-0-1			9,469
1962–63	**Second Division**	2	42	11	13	18	55	66	-11	35	**19th of 22**			R3	0-0-1	R2	0-0-1			11,216
1963–64	**Second Division**	2	42	9	14	19	47	75	-28	32	**21st of 22**; Relegated			R3	0-0-1	R2	0-0-1			9,515
1964–65	**Third Division**	3	46	16	17	13	68	67	+1	49	**10th of 24**			R2	1-2-1	R3	1-0-1			7,144
1965–66	**Third Division**	3	46	17	13	16	68	62	+6	47	**11th of 24**			R4	3-2-1	QF	3-1-1			7,239
1966–67	**Third Division**	3	46	17	9	20	61	68	-7	43	**17th of 24**			R1	0-1-1	R4	3-1-1			5,965
1967–68	**Third Division**	3	46	14	9	23	52	69	-17	37	**21st of 24**; Relegated			R1	0-0-1	R2	1-1-1			4,301
1968–69	**Fourth Division**	4	46	9	15	22	47	69	-22	33	**23rd of 24**			R1	0-0-1	R2	1-2-1			3,984
1969–70	**Fourth Division**	4	46	14	15	17	54	58	-4	43	**16th of 24**			R1	0-0-1	R1	0-0-1			4,112
1970–71	**Fourth Division**	4	46	18	7	21	57	71	-14	43	**19th of 24**			R1	0-0-1	R1	0-0-1			4,143
1971–72	**Fourth Division**	4	46	28	7	11	88	56	+32	63	**1st of 24**; Promoted			R1	0-0-1	R4	3-2-1			11,164
1972–73	**Third Division**	3	46	20	8	18	67	61	+6	48	**9th of 24**			R4	3-2-1	R2	1-1-1			10,657
1973–74	**Third Division**	3	46	18	15	13	67	50	+17	51	**6th of 24**			R3	2-1-1	R2	1-2-1			7,240
1974–75	**Third Division**	3	46	15	13	18	55	64	-9	43	**16th of 24**			R2	1-1-1	R1	0-0-1			5,619
1975–76	**Third Division**	3	46	15	10	21	62	74	-12	40	**18th of 24**			R1	0-0-1	R1	0-1-1			5,380
1976–77	**Third Division**	3	46	12	9	25	45	69	-24	33	**23rd of 24**; Relegated			R2	1-1-1	R1	0-1-1			4,359
1977–78	**Fourth Division**	4	46	21	11	14	57	51	+6	53	**6th of 24**			R3	2-2-1	R2	2-0-1			4,463
1978–79	**Fourth Division**	4	46	26	9	11	82	49	+23	61	**2nd of 24**; Promoted			R1	0-0-1	R2	2-0-1			6,290
1979–80	**Third Division**	3	46	26	10	10	73	42	+31	62	**1st of 24**; Promoted	Kevin Drinkell	16	R3	2-1-1	QF	5-3-1			10,498
1980–81	**Second Division**	2	42	15	15	12	44	42	+2	45	**7th of 22**			R3	0-0-1	R1	1-0-1			10,960
1981–82	**Second Division**	2	42	11	13	18	53	65	-12	46	**17th of 22**			R5	2-0-1	R2	1-0-1			8,409
1982–83	**Second Division**	2	42	12	11	19	45	70	-25	47	**19th of 22**			R4	1-1-1	R2	1-2-1			7,751
1983–84	**Second Division**	2	42	19	13	10	60	47	+13	70	**5th of 22**			R3	0-0-1	R2	1-1-2			7,579
1984–85	**Second Division**	2	42	18	8	16	72	64	+8	62	**10th of 22**			R4	1-1-1	QF	3-2-1			6,466
1985–86	**Second Division**	2	42	14	10	18	58	62	-4	52	**15th of 22**			R3	0-0-1	R3	1-1-1			5,160
1986–87	**Second Division**	2	42	10	14	18	39	59	-20	44	**21st of 22**; Relegated			R3	0-2-1	R2	1-1-2			5,145
1987–88	**Third Division**	3	46	12	14	20	48	58	-10	50	**22nd of 24**; Relegated			R2	1-1-1	R1	1-0-1	G	1-0-2	3,336
1988–89	**Fourth Division**	4	46	17	15	14	65	59	+6	66	**9th of 24**			R5	4-1-1	R1	0-0-2	R1	1-1-1	4,267
1989–90	**Fourth Division**	4	46	22	13	11	70	47	+23	79	**2nd of 24**; Promoted			R3	2-0-1	R2	2-0-2	G	0-1-1	5,991
1990–91	**Third Division**	3	46	24	11	11	66	34	+32	83	**3rd of 24**; Promoted			R1	0-0-1	R1	1-0-1	G	0-0-2	7,237
1991–92	**Second Division**	2	46	14	11	21	47	62	-15	53	**19th of 24**			R1	0-0-1	R3	2-2-1			6,898
Football League divisions renamed after the Premier League creation.
1992–93	**First Division**	2	46	19	7	20	58	57	+1	64	**9th of 24**			R5	2-1-1	R2	1-2-1			6,091
1993–94	**First Division**	2	46	13	20	13	52	47	+5	59	**16th of 24**			R4	1-0-1	R3	2-0-1			6,075
1994–95	**First Division**	2	46	17	14	15	62	56	+6	65	**10th of 24**			R3	0-0-1	R1	0-0-2			5,921
**1995–96**	**First Division**	2	46	14	14	18	55	69	-14	56	**17th of 24**			R5	2-2-1	R1	0-1-1			5,865
**1996–97**	**First Division**	2	46	11	13	22	60	81	-21	46	**22nd of 24**; Relegated	Clive Mendonca	18	R3	0-0-1	R1	1-0-1			5,640
**1997–98**	**Second Division**	3	46	19	15	12	55	37	+18	72	**3rd of 24**; Promoted	Kevin Donovan	16	R4	3-2-1	R4	3-0-3	W	6-1-0	5,271
**1997–98**	**Second Division**	3	Promoted after winning the play-offs.																	
**1998–99**	**First Division**	2	46	17	10	19	40	52	-12	61	**11th of 24**	Paul Groves	14	R1	0-0-1	R3	1-2-2			6,698
**1999–2000**	**First Division**	2	46	13	12	21	41	67	-26	51	**20th of 24**	Lee Ashcroft	12	R4	1-0-1	R3	2-1-2			6,157
**2000–01**	**First Division**	2	46	14	10	22	43	62	-19	52	**18th of 24**	Steve Livingstone	7	R3	0-1-1	R2	2-1-1			5,646
**2001–02**	**First Division**	2	46	12	14	20	50	72	-22	50	**19th of 24**	Michael Boulding	11	R3	0-1-1	R4	2-1-1			6,431
**2002–03**	**First Division**	2	46	9	12	25	48	85	-37	39	**24th of 24**; Relegated	Stuart Campbell; Steve Kabba; John Oster	6	R3	0-1-1	R1	0-0-1			5,700
**2003–04**	**Second Division**	3	46	13	11	22	55	81	-26	50	**21st of 24**; Relegated	Michael Boulding; Phil Jevons	12	R2	1-0-1	R1	0-0-1	R1	0-1-0	4,730
Football League divisions renamed.
**2004–05**	**Football**; **League Two**	4	46	14	16	16	51	52	-1	58	**18th of 24**	Michael Reddy	9	R1	0-0-1	R2	1-0-1	R1	0-0-1	4,943
**2005–06**	**Football**; **League Two**	4	46	22	12	12	64	44	+20	78	**4th of 24**	Michael Reddy	14	R1	0-0-1	R3	2-0-1	R1	0-1-0	5,151
**2005–06**	**Football**; **League Two**	4	Lost in the **play-off** final.											R1	0-0-1	R3	2-0-1	R1	0-1-0	5,151
**2006–07**	**Football**; **League Two**	4	46	17	8	21	57	73	-16	59	**15th of 24**	Peter Bore; Gary Jones; Ciarán Toner	8	R1	0-1-1	R1	0-0-1	R2	0-1-1	4,379
**2007–08**	**Football**; **League Two**	4	46	15	10	21	55	66	-11	55	**16th of 24**	Danny North	9	R2	1-1-1	R1	0-0-1	F	3-3-1	4,115
**2008–09**	**Football**; **League Two**	4	46	9	14	23	51	69	-18	41	**22nd of 24**	Adam Proudlock	7	R1	0-0-1	R2	1-0-1	R2	0-1-1	4,475
**2009–10**	**Football**; **League Two**	4	46	9	17	20	45	71	-26	44	**23rd of 24**; Relegated	four players	5	R1	0-0-1	R1	0-0-1	AQF	1-0-1	4,428
2010–11	**Conference**; **National**	5	46	15	17	14	72	62	+10	62	**11th of 24**	Alan Connell	25	QR4	0-1-1			R2	1-0-1	3,073
2011–12	**Conference**; **National**	5	46	19	13	14	79	60	+19	70	**11th of 24**	Liam Hearn	27	R2	2-2-1			QF	3-0-1	3,308
2012–13	**Conference**; **National**	5	46	23	14	9	70	38	+32	83	**4th of 24**	Andy Cook	11	QR4	0-0-1			F	5-3-0	3,813
2012–13	**Conference**; **National**	5	Lost in the **play-off** semifinal.											QR4	0-0-1			F	5-3-0	3,813
2013–14	**Conference**; **National**	5	46	22	12	12	65	46	+19	78	**4th of 24**	Ross Hannah	13	R3	3-1-1			SF	4-2-1	3,568
2013–14	**Conference**; **National**	5	Lost in the **play-off** semifinal.											R3	3-1-1			SF	4-2-1	3,568
2014–15	**Conference**; **National**	5	46	25	11	10	74	40	+34	86	**3rd of 24**	Lenell John-Lewis	16	R1	1-0-1			R2	1-1-1	3,683
2014–15	**Conference**; **National**	5	Lost in the **play-off** final.											R1	1-0-1			R2	1-1-1	3,683
Fifth and sixth tier divisions renamed.
2015–16	**National**; **League**	5	46	22	14	10	82	45	+37	80	**4th of 24**; Promoted	Pádraig Amond	30	R2	2-1-1			F	6-1-1	4,357
2015–16	**National**; **League**	5	Promoted after winning the play-offs.											R2	2-1-1			F	6-1-1	4,357
**2016–17**	**Football**; **League Two**	4	46	17	11	18	59	63	-4	62	**14th of 24**	Omar Bogle	19	R1	0-0-1	R1	0-0-1	G	0-0-3	5,259
**2017–18**	**Football**; **League Two**	4	46	13	12	21	42	66	-24	51	**18th of 24**	Mitch Rose	8	R1	0-0-1	R1	0-0-1	G	0-2-1	4,658
**2018–19**	**Football**; **League Two**	4	46	16	8	22	45	56	-11	56	**17th of 24**	Wes Thomas	11	R3	2-0-1	R1	0-0-1	G	1-0-2	4,430
**2019–20**	**Football**; **League Two**	4	37 (Note: The 2019–20 season was disrupted by the effects of the COVID-19 pandemic. The season was suspended in March 2020 and was then officially ended in May 2020. Final league standings were decided on a points per game basis.)	12	11	14	45	51	-6	47	**15th of 24**	James Hanson	9	R1	0-1-1	R3	2-0-1	G	0-0-3	4,599
**2020–21**	**Football**; **League Two**	4	46	10	13	23	37	69	-32	43	**24th of 24**; Relegated	Lenell John-Lewis	4	R1	0-0-1	R1	0-0-1	G	0-1-2	0 (Note: Due to the COVID-19 pandemic, matches were played behind closed doors to avoid transmission of the virus.)
2021–22	**National**; **League**	5	44	23	8	13	68	46	+22	77	**6th of 23**; Promoted	John McAtee	14	R1	1-0-1			R3	0-0-1	5,568
2021–22	**National**; **League**	5	Promoted after winning the play-offs.											R1	1-0-1			R3	0-0-1	5,568
**2022–23**	**Football**; **League Two**	4	46	16	13	17	49	56	-7	61	**11th of 24**	Harry Clifton	7	QF	5-1-1	R2	1-0-1	R2	1-1-2	6,279
**2023–24**	**Football**; **League Two**	4	46	11	16	19	57	74	-17	49	**21st of 24**	Danny Rose	13	R2	1-1-1	R1	0-0-1	G	0-1-2	6,354
**2024–25**	**Football**; **League Two**	4	46	20	8	18	61	67	-6	68	**9th of 24**	Danny Rose	14	R1	0-0-1	R2	0-1-1	G	0-1-2	6,067
**2025-26**	**Football**; **League Two**	4	46	22	12	12	74	50	+24	78	**7th of 24**	Jaze Kabia	18	R4	3-0-1	R4	2-1-1	G	1-0-2	6,537

== External sources ==
- Football Club History Database
- English Football Archive
