= 2000–01 Grimsby Town F.C. season =

Grimsby Town
2000–01 season
- Chairman: Doug Everitt
- Manager: Alan Buckley (until 22 August); Lennie Lawrence (from 29 August)
- Stadium: Blundell Park
- Football League First Division: 18th
- FA Cup: Third round
- Worthington Cup: Second round
- Top goalscorer: Livingstone (7)
- Average home league attendance: 5,646

During the 2000–01 English football season, Grimsby Town F.C. competed in the Football League First Division.

== Season summary ==
The 2000–01 season saw a boardroom change with Doug Everitt taking over from Bill Carr. Everitt dismissed manager Alan Buckley just two games into the season, replacing him with Lennie Lawrence, who earlier in his managerial career had guided both Charlton Athletic and Middlesbrough into the top flight. The new manager chop and changed the playing squad around and brought in some expensive loan signings from abroad such as Zhang Enhua, Menno Willems, David Nielsen and Knut Anders Fostervold. Despite this, the club struggled to avoid relegation, only securing their place in Division One on the last day of the season with a win over promoted Fulham.

== Transfers ==
=== Transfers in ===
Date	Pos	Player	Transferred from	Fee	Ref
12 July 2000	DF	(England) Paul Raven	(England) West Bromwich Albion	Free Transfer	
1 August 2000	MF	(England) Andy Smith	(England) Barnsley	Free Transfer	
11 August 2000	FW	(England) Mike Jeffrey	(Scotland) Kilmarnock	Free Transfer	
12 October 2000	GK	(New Zealand) Jason Batty	(New Zealand) Football Kingz	Free Transfer	
28 February 2001	MF	(Netherlands) Menno Willems	(Netherlands) Vitesse Arnhem	£150,000	
30 March 2001	MF	(Scotland) Stuart Campbell	(England) Leicester City	£200,000	

=== Loans in ===
Date	Pos	Player	Transferred from	Date Until	Ref
15 September 2000	MF	(Scotland) Stuart Campbell	(England) Leicester City	29 March 2001	
11 October 2000	FW	(Denmark) David Nielsen	(Denmark) FC Copenhagen	17 January 2001	
28 October 2000	MF	(Scotland) Neil Murray	(Germany) Mainz 05	1 February 2001	
16 November 2000	MF	(Norway) Knut Anders Fostervold	(Norway) Molde FK	1 February 2001	
24 November 2000	MF	(Netherlands) Menno Willems	(Netherlands) Vitesse Arnhem	27 February 2001	
28 November 2000	DF	(China) Zhang Enhua	(China) Dalian Shide	8 May 2001	
13 March 2001	FW	(England) Luke Cornwall	(England) Fulham	8 May 2001	
21 March 2001	GK	(Denmark) Morten Hyldgaard	(England) Coventry City	7 May 2001	

=== Transfers out ===
Date	Pos	Player	Transferred To	Fee	Ref
1 July 2000	GK	(England) Andy Love	(England) Ilkeston Town	Released	
1 July 2000	MF	(England) Matthew Oswin	(United States) Indiana Invaders	Released	
1 July 2000	MF	(England) Matt McKenzie	(England) Ilkeston Town	Released	
11 July 2000	DF	(England) Mark Lever	(England) Bristol City	Free Transfer	
5 August 2000	FW	(England) Lee Ashcroft	(England) Wigan Athletic	£350,000	
2 February 2001	GK	(New Zealand) Jason Batty	(England) Scunthorpe United	Released	

=== Loans out ===
Date	Pos	Player	Transferred To	Date Until	Ref
11 October 2000	MF	(Northern Ireland) Kingsley Black	(England) Lincoln City	11 November 2000	
24 November 2000	FW	(Republic of Ireland) Daryl Clare	(England) Northampton Town	24 December 2000	
5 January 2001	FW	(Republic of Ireland) Daryl Clare	(England) Cheltenham Town	5 February 2001	

== Final league table ==
Pos	Team	Pld	W	D	L	GF	GA	GD	Pts
16	Barnsley	46	15	9	22	49	62	−13	54
17	Sheffield Wednesday	46	15	8	23	52	71	−19	53
18	Grimsby Town	46	14	10	22	43	62	−19	52
19	Stockport County	46	11	18	17	58	65	−7	51
20	Portsmouth	46	10	19	17	47	59	−12	49

Rules for classification: 1) Points; 2) Goal difference; 3) Goals scored

== Results ==
Grimsby Town's score comes first

=== Legend ===
Win	Draw	Loss

=== Football League First Division ===
Date	Opponent	Venue	Result	Attendance	Scorers
12 August 2000	Preston North End	H	1–2	5,755	Livingstone
19 August 2000	Portsmouth	A	1–1	12,511	Smith
26 August 2000	Sheffield Wednesday	H	0–1	7,755	
29 August 2000	Crewe Alexandra	A	0–2	5,305	
9 September 2000	Gillingham	H	1–0	4,512	Livingstone
12 September 2000	Bolton Wanderers	H	0–1	3,732	
16 September 2000	Burnley	A	1–1	15,413	Butterfield
23 September 2000	Nottingham Forest	H	0–2	6,467	
30 September 2000	Barnsley	A	0–2	13,096	
14 October 2000	Huddersfield Town	H	1–0	4,911	Allen
17 October 2000	Queens Park Rangers	H	3–1	4,428	Livingstone (2), Nielsen
21 October 2000	Blackburn Rovers	A	0–2	16,397	
24 October 2000	Crystal Palace	A	1–0	16,685	Allen
29 October 2000	West Bromwich Albion	H	2–0	5,429	Allen, Nielsen
4 November 2000	Watford	A	0–4	11,600	
18 November 2000	Sheffield United	A	2–3	12,861	Livingstone, Nielsen
21 November 2000	Wolverhampton Wanderers	A	0–2	16,088	
25 November 2000	Fulham	A	1–2	12,107	Donovan
2 December 2000	Crystal Palace	H	2–2	5,802	Jeffrey, Donovan
9 December 2000	Tranmere Rovers	A	0–2	7,119	
13 December 2000	Wimbledon	A	2–2	4,489	Smith, Nielsen
16 December 2000	Norwich City	H	2–0	5,618	Fleming (own goal), Nielsen
23 December 2000	Preston North End	A	2–1	14,667	Willems, Groves
26 December 2000	Stockport County	H	1–1	6,654	Burnett
1 January 2001	Sheffield Wednesday	A	0–1	17,004	
13 January 2001	Crewe Alexandra	H	1–3	4,495	Donovan
20 January 2001	Stockport County	A	1–1	6,165	Donovan
27 January 2001	Portsmouth	H	2–1	4,128	Donovan, Livingstone
10 February 2001	Gillingham	A	0–1	8,633	
17 February 2001	Burnley	H	1–0	6,044	Zhang
20 February 2001	Bolton Wanderers	A	2–2	24,249	Groves, Zhang
24 February 2001	Nottingham Forest	A	1–3	21,660	Campbell
3 March 2001	Barnsley	H	0–2	5,996	
6 March 2001	Huddersfield Town	A	0–0	9,494	
10 March 2001	Wolverhampton Wanderers	H	0–2	4,899	
13 March 2001	Wimbledon	H	1–1	4,276	Zhang
17 March 2001	Queens Park Rangers	A	1–0	17,608	Groves
20 March 2001	Birmingham City	H	1–1	4,843	Pouton (pen)
31 March 2001	Norwich City	A	1–2	17,461	Campbell
7 April 2001	Tranmere Rovers	H	3–1	5,816	Cornwall (2), Livingstone
14 April 2001	Watford	H	2–1	6,110	Handyside, Coldicott
16 April 2001	West Bromwich Albion	A	1–0	16,504	Cornwall
21 April 2001	Sheffield United	H	0–1	6,983	
24 April 2001	Blackburn Rovers	H	1–4	6,507	Cornwall
28 April 2001	Birmingham City	A	0–1	24,822	
6 May 2001	Fulham	H	1–0	8,706	Groves

=== FA Cup ===
Round	Date	Opponent	Venue	Result	Attendance	Goalscorers
Third round	6 January 2001	Wycombe Wanderers	A	1–1	5,390	Nielsen
Third round replay	16 January 2001	Wycombe Wanderers	H	1–3	3,269	Jeffrey

=== League Cup ===
Round	Date	Opponent	Venue	Result	Attendance	Goalscorers
First round first leg	22 August 2000	Carlisle United	H	2–0	1,914	Coldicott, Allen
First round second leg	5 September 2000	Carlisle United	A	1–1 (won 4–2 on agg)	2,228	Allen
Second round first Leg	26 September 2000	Wolverhampton Wanderers	H	3–2	2,396	Gallimore, Rowan, Allen
Second round second Leg	2 October 2000	Wolverhampton Wanderers	A	0–2 (lost 3–4 on agg)	8,058	

== Squad ==
Note: Flags indicate national team as defined under FIFA eligibility rules; some limited exceptions apply. Players may hold more than one non-FIFA nationality.

No.	Pos.	Nation	Player
1	GK	(Wales) WAL	Danny Coyne
2	DF	(England) ENG	John McDermott
3	DF	(England) ENG	Tony Gallimore
4	DF	(Scotland) SCO	Peter Handyside
5	DF	(England) ENG	Richard Smith
6	MF	(England) ENG	Wayne Burnett
7	MF	(England) ENG	Kevin Donovan
8	MF	(England) ENG	David Smith
9	FW	(England) ENG	Mike Jeffrey
10	MF	(Scotland) SCO	Stuart Campbell (on loan from Leicester City)
11	MF	(England) ENG	Paul Groves
12	DF	(England) ENG	Danny Butterfield
13	GK	(England) ENG	Steve Croudson
14	FW	(England) ENG	Steve Livingstone
15	DF	(England) ENG	Paul Raven

No.	Pos.	Nation	Player
16	MF	(England) ENG	Stacy Coldicott
17	MF	(Northern Ireland) NIR	Kingsley Black
18	MF	(England) ENG	Adam Buckley
19	FW	(Ireland) EIR	Daryl Clare
20	DF	(England) ENG	Matthew Bloomer
21	MF	(Scotland) SCO	Neil Murray (on loan from Mainz 05)
22	DF	(England) ENG	Ben Chapman
23	FW	(England) ENG	Jonathan Rowan
24	MF	(England) ENG	Andy Smith
25	FW	(England) ENG	Bradley Allen
26	MF	(England) ENG	Alan Pouton
27	GK	(Denmark) DEN	Morten Hyldgaard (on loan from Coventry City)
28	FW	(England) ENG	Luke Cornwall (on loan from Fulham)
29	DF	(Netherlands) NED	Menno Willems

=== Left club during season ===
Note: Flags indicate national team as defined under FIFA eligibility rules; some limited exceptions apply. Players may hold more than one non-FIFA nationality.

No.	Pos.	Nation	Player
27	FW	(Denmark) DEN	David Nielsen (on loan from F.C. Copenhagen)
28	DF	(Norway) NOR	Knut Anders Fostervold (on loan from Molde FK)

No.	Pos.	Nation	Player
30	DF	(China) CHN	Zhang Enhua (on loan from Dalian Wanda)

== Statistics ==
=== Appearances and goals ===
No.	Pos	Nat	Player	Total		First Division		FA Cup		League Cup	
No.	Pos	Nat	Player	Apps	Goals	Apps	Goals	Apps	Goals	Apps	Goals
Goalkeepers
1	GK	(Wales) WAL	Danny Coyne	52	0	46	0	2	0	4	0
Defenders
2	DF	(England) ENG	John McDermott	40	0	36	0	1	0	3	0
3	DF	(England) ENG	Tony Gallimore	32	1	26+2	0	2	0	2	1
4	DF	(Scotland) SCO	Peter Handyside	24	1	17+2	1	1+1	0	3	0
5	DF	(England) ENG	Richard Smith	8	1	2+4	1	2	0	0	0
12	DF	(England) ENG	Danny Butterfield	35	1	23+7	1	2	0	3	0
15	DF	(England) ENG	Paul Raven	17	0	11+4	0	0	0	2	0
20	DF	(England) ENG	Matt Bloomer	8	0	3+3	0	0	0	0+2	0
22	DF	(England) ENG	Ben Chapman	2	0	0+2	0	0	0	0	0
29	DF	(Netherlands) NED	Menno Willems	26	1	17+7	1	2	0	0	0
Midfielders
6	MF	(England) ENG	Wayne Burnett	25	1	20+3	1	0+2	0	0	0
7	MF	(England) ENG	Kevin Donovan	45	5	36+5	5	2	0	2	0
8	MF	(England) ENG	David Smith	27	1	16+8	1	0	0	3	0
10	MF	(Scotland) SCO	Stuart Campbell	40	2	38	2	2	0	0	0
11	MF	(England) ENG	Paul Groves	50	4	45	4	1	0	4	0
16	MF	(England) ENG	Stacy Coldicott	43	2	34+3	1	1+1	0	4	1
17	MF	(Northern Ireland) NIR	Kingsley Black	7	0	4+1	0	0	0	0+2	0
21	MF	(Scotland) SCO	Neil Murray	2	0	1+1	0	0	0	0	0
26	MF	(England) ENG	Alan Pouton	35	1	16+5	1	10	0	4	0
Forwards
9	FW	(England) ENG	Michael Jeffrey	34	2	15+14	1	1	1	3+1	0
14	FW	(England) ENG	Steve Livingstone	36	7	27+5	7	2	0	2	0
19	FW	(Republic of Ireland) IRL	Daryl Clare	21	0	6+11	0	0	0	1+3	0
23	FW	(England) ENG	Jonathan Rowan	7	1	2+3	0	0	0	0+2	1
25	FW	(England) ENG	Bradley Allen	25	6	15+6	3	0	0	4	3
28	FW	(England) ENG	Luke Cornwall	10	4	9+1	4	0	0	0	0
Players left during the season
27	FW	(Denmark) DEN	David Nielsen	19	6	16+1	5	1+1	1	0	0
28	DF	(Norway) NOR	Knut Anders Fostervold	10	0	9+1	0	0	0	0	0
30	DF	(China) CHN	Zhang Enhua	17	3	16+1	3	0	0	0	0
