= Peter Handyside =

Scottish footballer (1974–2024)

Personal information
- Full name: Peter David Handyside
- Date of birth: 31 July 1974
- Place of birth: Dumfries, Scotland
- Date of death: 9 February 2024 (aged 49)
- Place of death: Dumfries, Scotland
- Position: Centre-back

Youth career
- 1986–1989: Heston Rovers
- 1989–1990: Queen of the South
- 1990–1991: Grimsby Town

Senior career*
Years	Team	Apps	(Gls)
1992–2001	Grimsby Town	201	(4)
2001–2003	Stoke City	78	(0)
2003–2004	Barnsley	28	(0)
2004–2006	Northwich Victoria	29	(0)
2006–2007	Hucknall Town		
Total		325	(4)

International career
1993–1995	Scotland U21	8	(0)
- * Club domestic league appearances and goals

Peter David Handyside (31 July 1974 – 9 February 2024) was a Scottish professional footballer who played as a centre-back from 1992 until 2007.

Despite being Scottish, Handyside played his entire career in England, having initially came through the youth ranks at Heston Rovers he was scouted by Grimsby Town who signed him as a junior before promoting him to the first team in 1992. Handyside went on to make over 200 appearances for Grimsby in all competitions and was in the team that won the Football League Second Division play-offs and Football League Trophy during the 1997–98 season. In 2001 after nine years at Blundell Park, Handyside joined Stoke City who he went on to captain and eventually earning promotion out of the Second Division like he had previously done at Grimsby. In 2003, he signed with Barnsley where he remained for a year before dropping into non-league football with Northwich Victoria. In 2006, he signed with Hucknall Town before retiring at the end of the 2006–07 season at the age of 33.

== Career ==
=== Early career ===
Handyside was a product of the youth system at Heston Rovers a local side from his home town of Dumfries. He also had a spell on the books of the youth team of Queen of the South including playing in a BP Youth Cup second round tie against Celtic on 31 October 1990.

=== Grimsby Town ===
Handyside was trialled by Grimsby Town and was signed by the club's youth team in 1990. He took his step up into the first team in 1992 and was eventually the club's long-term replacement for veteran centre back Paul Futcher and made an excellent pairing with Mark Lever. Handyside's maturity grew and he became an integral part of Grimsby's defensive setup, and along with Lever, John McDermott, Tony Gallimore, Graham Rodger, Kevin Jobling and Richard Smith was part of arguably Grimsby's best ever defence. The 1997–1998 Handyside continued to be the nucleus of Town's strong defence that helped achieve a promotion back to the First Division via the play-offs, and victory in the Football League Trophy. He bowed out at Grimsby after the 2000–01 season. An injury-troubled campaign, he was often replaced by loan-signing Zhang Enhua. At the end of the season, he rejected the chance to stay on with Grimsby and moved to Second Division Stoke City.

=== Stoke City ===
Handyside joined Stoke City in the summer of 2001 on a free-transfer and was made club captain. He played in 41 matches in 2001–02 including the 2002 Football League Second Division play-off final which saw Stoke beat Brentford to gain promotion. That season he also scored his first and only goal for Stoke in an FA Cup tie against Lewes. He missed only three matches in 2002–03 as Stoke narrowly avoided relegation and at the end of the campaign he was released by Tony Pulis.

=== Barnsley ===
In 2003, he made a move to Barnsley but after a season hit with fitness and injury problems he departed Oakwell at the end of the 2003–04 season.

=== Northwich Victoria ===
His next port of call was to make a move to Conference club Northwich Victoria where he captained the Vics for two seasons before being released.

=== Hucknall Town ===
Hucknall Town signed Handyside for the 2006–07 campaign. He remained at the club for one year before leaving the club on a free transfer. Handyside has played alongside his fellow Grimsby promotion winning teammate Tony Gallimore at four different clubs: Grimsby, Barnsley, Northwich Victoria and Hucknall; the only team at which Peter has not played with Tony is Stoke City, ironically Gallimore's first senior club.

== Personal life and death ==
After retiring from professional football Handyside worked as a delivery driver for Gilberts Furniture on the Fenton Industrial Estate in Stoke on Trent. In December 2013 Handyside's daughter was diagnosed with leukaemia, and in 2014 she launched her own campaign named "Maia's Mission".

Handyside died on 9 February 2024, at the age of 49 of sepsis.

== Legacy ==
In June 2024 it was announced that Grimsby Town and Stoke City's academy teams will play each other in annual pre-season friendlies in memory of Peter Handyside.

== Career statistics ==
Appearances and goals by club, season and competition
Club	Season	League			FA Cup		League Cup		Other		Total	
Club	Season	Division	Apps	Goals	Apps	Goals	Apps	Goals	Apps	Goals	Apps	Goals
Grimsby Town	1992–93	First Division	11	0	0	0	2	0	2 (Note: Appearances in Anglo-Italian Cup)	0	15	0
Grimsby Town	1993–94	First Division	13	0	2	0	1	0	2	0	18	0
Grimsby Town	1994–95	First Division	35	0	1	0	0	0	—		36	0
Grimsby Town	1995–96	First Division	30	0	1	0	2	0	—		33	0
Grimsby Town	1996–97	First Division	9	1	0	0	2	0	—		11	1
Grimsby Town	1997–98	Second Division	42	0	6	0	6	0	10 (Note: Seven Appearances in Football League Trophy and three in Second Division play-offs)	0	64	0
Grimsby Town	1998–99	First Division	31	2	1	0	3	0	—		35	2
Grimsby Town	1999–2000	First Division	0	0	0	0	0	0	—		0	0
Grimsby Town	2000–01	First Division	19	1	2	0	3	0	—		24	1
Grimsby Town	Total		190	4	13	0	19	0	14	0	236	4
Stoke City	2001–02	Second Division	34	0	3	1	1	0	3 (Note: Appearances in Second Division play-offs)	0	41	1
Stoke City	2002–03	First Division	44	0	2	0	1	0	—		47	0
Stoke City	Total		78	0	5	1	2	0	3	0	88	1
Barnsley	2003–04	Second Division	28	0	2	0	1	0	1 (Note: Appearance in Football League Trophy)	0	32	0
Northwich Victoria	2004–05	Football Conference	29	0	0	0	0	0	1 (Note: Appearance in FA Trophy)	0	30	0
Career total			325	4	20	1	22	0	19	0	386	5

== Honours ==
Grimsby Town

- Football League Second Division play-offs: 1998
- Football League Trophy: 1997–98

Stoke City

- Football League Second Division play-offs: 2002
