= Steve Livingstone =

English footballer (born 1969)

Personal information
- Full name: Stephen Carl Livingstone
- Date of birth: 8 September 1969 (age 57)
- Place of birth: Middlesbrough, England
- Height: 6 ft 1 in (1.85 m)
- Position: Forward

Youth career
- 1985–1986: Coventry City

Senior career*
Years	Team	Apps	(Gls)
1986–1991	Coventry City	31	(5)
1991–1993	Blackburn Rovers	30	(10)
1993	Chelsea	1	(0)
1993	→ Port Vale (loan)	5	(0)
1993	→ Grimsby Town (loan)	11	(1)
1993–2003	Grimsby Town	278	(42)
2003–2004	Carlisle United	6	(0)
Total		362	(58)
- * Club domestic league appearances and goals

Stephen Carl Livingstone (born 8 September 1969) is an English former professional footballer who played as a forward and makeshift defender from 1986 to 2004.

He began his career at Coventry City in 1986, though he had little impact at the club before he joined Blackburn Rovers for a £450,000 fee in January 1991. He helped Rovers to win promotion to the top-flight via the play-offs 1992. In March 1993, he was sold to Chelsea for a £350,000 fee, but only played one league game for the club. He was loaned out to Port Vale in September 1993 before being moved on to Grimsby Town for £140,000 the following month. He spent the next ten years at the club, helping the "Mariners" to win promotion out of the Second Division via the play-offs in 1998, as well as the Football League Trophy title, again in 1998. He joined Carlisle United in 2003 before retiring due to injury in January 2004.

== Career ==
=== Coventry City ===
Livingstone was promoted to the first-team squad at Coventry City in July 1986 following one year on a Youth Training Scheme. He went on to make just under 50 appearances for the "Sky Blues" in all competitions between 1986 and 1991, including 31 in the First Division. He proved an able stand-in for Kevin Drinkell, once scoring a rare double-brace in a 5–0 League Cup fixture against Sunderland in January 1990. Still, despite scoring in the League Cup semi-final defeat to Nottingham Forest, he failed to establish himself in the starting eleven. He played under George Curtis, John Sillett, and Terry Butcher.

=== Blackburn Rovers ===
In January 1991, Livingstone was signed by Don Mackay of Second Division side Blackburn Rovers for a fee of £450,000. He scored seven goals in his first ten games for Blackburn during the second half of the 1990–91 season, though he would later lose his spot due to questions over his fitness. Rovers occupied the final play-off spot at the end of the 1991–92 season under new manager Kenny Dalglish, and went on to beat Leicester City 1–0 in the Wembley final. However, Livingstone featured just twice in the 1992–93 Premier League campaign, in a 2–1 defeat to Everton at Goodison Park and a 1–1 draw with Middlesbrough at Ewood Park.

=== Chelsea ===
He moved to Stamford Bridge in March 1993 after Chelsea manager David Webb paid out a £350,000 fee. While with the "Blues", Livingstone went on to only make one substitute appearance, playing in a 3–0 defeat to Manchester United at Old Trafford on 17 April; he replaced Neil Shipperley in the 55th minute of the game. Chairman Ken Bates did not renew Webb's contract, and Livingstone did not feature in new boss Glenn Hoddle's first-team plans. In September 1993, he was signed by Port Vale manager John Rudge on a one-month loan; he played five Second Division games before returning to London.

=== Grimsby Town ===
In October 1993, Livingstone was loaned out to Grimsby Town, with the deal being made permanent for a £140,000 fee two months later. Grimsby were a small club struggling to survive in the First Division under Alan Buckley. He was an instant hit at Blundell Park, and his performances earned him respect amongst the "Mariners" fans. He formed strike partnerships with Clive Mendonca, Jack Lester and Lee Nogan. "Livvo", as he was known to Grimsby supporters, was able to use his frame and weight to make himself a handy target man and was a frequent goalscorer in his ten years with the club. Despite recording just seven home wins in 1993–94, Town remained safely in mid-table. They then finished tenth in 1994–95 under new manager Brian Laws. Livingstone was the club's joint-top scorer in 1995–96 with ten goals, along with Paul Groves. Grimsby were relegated at the end of the 1996–97 campaign, despite Livingstone scoring six goals in 34 appearances, including a brace against Sheffield United.

With Alan Buckley returning as manager, the "Mariners" won immediate promotion in 1997–98 after beating Northampton Town 1–0 in the Second Division play-off final at Wembley. Grimsby also found success at Wembley in the Football League Trophy final after beating AFC Bournemouth 2–1 after extra time; Livingstone was a 55th-minute substitute for Daryl Clare. Throughout the campaign Livingstone hit nine goals in 59 games, scoring twice in clashes with Fulham, Leicester City, and Bristol Rovers. He played 30 games without scoring in 1998–99, as Town recorded an eleventh-place finish in the second tier.

Livingstone played 34 games in the 1999–2000 campaign, as Grimsby finished two places above the relegation zone; he scored just two goals, both coming against Stockport County in the FA Cup. New manager Lennie Lawrence was appointed for the 2000–01 campaign, and Livingstone continued to be a key player, finishing as the club's top-scorer with seven goals in 36 games. His last four years with Grimsby were hampered by injury, and he only played a cameo role each season. He appeared in just three games in April in the 2001–02 season. On 17 August 2002, he collided badly with Derby County defender Danny Higginbotham and was knocked unconscious; this left Livingstone with a head injury that would see him out of action for a couple of months. His old target man status returned briefly, as he helped Grimsby edge a thrilling 6–5 win over Burnley in an impressive performance alongside fellow striker Steve Kabba. He posted 31 appearances in 2002–03, scoring three goals; however, Grimsby were relegated in last place.

=== Carlisle United ===
Carlisle United manager Roddy Collins came in for the veteran forward and initially signed him on a free transfer in July 2003. However, Livingstone struggled with his fitness, and made a total of nine appearances for the club, with two red cards, one of them on his debut against York City, the other against Lincoln City. He also collected three yellow cards in this time, and all this without scoring a goal. He was placed on the transfer list four months after signing with the club, but due to a persistent back problem, he retired in January 2004. The "Cumbrians" went on to suffer relegation out of the Third Division, thereby losing their Football League status.

== Personal life ==
Livingstone's father, Joe Livingstone, also played professional football. His son, Jed, had a trial with Grimsby Town in 2009. He now lives in his native Middlesbrough and buys and sells properties.

== Career statistics ==
Appearances and goals by club, season and competition
Club	Season	League			FA Cup		Other		Total	
Club	Season	Division	Apps	Goals	Apps	Goals	Apps	Goals	Apps	Goals
Coventry City	1986–87	First Division	3	0	0	0	0	0	3	0
Coventry City	1987–88	First Division	4	0	0	0	1	0	5	0
Coventry City	1988–89	First Division	1	0	0	0	0	0	1	0
Coventry City	1989–90	First Division	13	3	0	0	5	5	18	8
Coventry City	1990–91	First Division	10	2	0	0	5	5	15	7
Coventry City	Total		31	5	0	0	11	10	42	15
Blackburn Rovers	1990–91	Second Division	18	9	0	0	0	0	18	9
Blackburn Rovers	1991–92	Second Division	10	1	0	0	1	0	11	1
Blackburn Rovers	1992–93	Premier League	2	0	1	1	1	0	4	1
Blackburn Rovers	Total		30	10	1	1	2	0	33	11
Chelsea	1992–93	Premier League	1	0	0	0	0	0	1	0
Chelsea	1993–94	Premier League	0	0	0	0	0	0	0	0
Chelsea	Total		1	0	0	0	0	0	1	0
Port Vale (loan)	1993–94	Second Division	5	0	0	0	0	0	5	0
Grimsby Town	1993–94	First Division	27	3	1	0	0	0	28	3
Grimsby Town	1994–95	First Division	34	8	0	0	2	0	36	8
Grimsby Town	1995–96	First Division	38	11	5	2	1	0	44	13
Grimsby Town	1996–97	First Division	32	6	0	0	2	0	34	6
Grimsby Town	1997–98	Second Division	41	5	5	0	13	4	59	9
Grimsby Town	1998–99	First Division	23	0	1	0	4	0	28	0
Grimsby Town	1999–2000	First Division	29	0	2	2	3	0	34	2
Grimsby Town	2000–01	First Division	32	7	2	0	2	0	36	7
Grimsby Town	2001–02	First Division	3	0	0	0	0	0	3	0
Grimsby Town	2002–03	First Division	30	3	1	0	0	0	31	3
Grimsby Town	Total		289	43	17	4	27	4	333	51
Carlisle United	2003–04	Third Division	6	0	0	0	3	0	9	0
Career total			362	58	18	5	43	14	423	77

== Honours ==
Blackburn Rovers

- Football League Second Division play-offs: 1992

Grimsby Town

- Football League Second Division play-offs: 1998
- Football League Trophy: 1997–98
