= 2003–04 Barnsley F.C. season =

Barnsley
2003–04 season
- Manager: Guðjón Þórðarson / Paul Hart
- Football League Second Division: 12th
- FA Cup: Third round
- League Cup: First round
- League Trophy: Second round

The 2003–04 season saw Barnsley compete in the Football League Second Division where they finished in 12th position with 62 points.

== Final league table ==
Pos	Team	Pld	W	D	L	GF	GA	GD	Pts
10	Luton Town	46	17	15	14	69	66	+3	66
11	Colchester United	46	17	13	16	52	56	−4	64
12	Barnsley	46	15	17	14	54	58	−4	62
13	Wrexham	46	17	9	20	50	60	−10	60
14	Blackpool	46	16	11	19	58	65	−7	59

Rules for classification: In the Football League goals scored (GF) takes precedence over goal difference (GD).

== Results ==
Barnsley's score comes first

=== Legend ===
Win	Draw	Loss

=== Football League Second Division ===
Match	Date	Opponent	Venue	Result	Attendance	Scorers
1	9 August 2003	Colchester United	H	1–0	8,450	Gorré
2	16 August 2003	Bournemouth	A	2–2	5,960	Gorré, Ireland
3	23 August 2003	Brighton & Hove Albion	H	1–0	7,918	Betsy
4	25 August 2003	Blackpool	A	2–0	6,039	Fallon, Lumsdon
5	30 August 2003	Notts County	H	1–1	9,087	Gorré
6	6 September 2003	Chesterfield	A	2–0	5,605	Ireland, Kay
7	13 September 2003	Port Vale	A	1–3	7,809	Fallon
8	16 September 2003	Oldham Athletic	H	1–1	10,102	Lumsdon
9	20 September 2003	Swindon Town	H	1–1	9,006	Fallon
10	27 September 2003	Plymouth Argyle	A	0–2	8,695	
11	30 September 2003	Queens Park Rangers	A	0–4	11,854	
12	4 October 2003	Rushden & Diamonds	H	2–0	8,461	Betsy, Gorré
13	18 October 2003	Wycombe Wanderers	H	2–1	4,446	Rankin
14	21 October 2003	Peterborough United	H	3–2	3,909	Betsy, Rankin, Carson
15	25 October 2003	Grimsby Town	H	0–0	10,092	
16	28 October 2003	Wrexham	H	2–1	8,912	Gorré, Rankin
17	1 November 2003	Brentford	A	1–2	4,789	Fallon
18	15 November 2003	Tranmere Rovers	H	2–0	9,663	Gorré, Rankin
19	22 November 2003	Bristol City	A	1–2	10,031	Burns
20	29 November 2003	Stockport County	H	3–3	9,047	Gorré, Betsy (2)
21	13 December 2003	Sheffield Wednesday	H	1–1	20,438	Kay
22	20 December 2003	Luton Town	A	1–0	6,162	Kay
23	26 December 2003	Hartlepool United	A	2–1	6,520	Betsy (2)
24	28 December 2003	Chesterfield	H	0–1	11,664	
25	10 January 2004	Colchester United	A	1–1	3,507	Betsy
26	17 January 2004	Bournemouth	H	1–1	7,939	Lumsdon
27	24 January 2004	Brighton & Hove Albion	A	0–1	6,033	
28	27 January 2004	Blackpool	H	3–0	7,913	Nardiello (2), Stallard
29	31 January 2004	Notts County	A	1–1	7,355	Betsy
30	7 February 2004	Hartlepool United	A	2–2	9,220	Nardiello, Hayward
31	14 February 2004	Wrexham	A	0–1	4,086	
32	21 February 2004	Wycombe Wanderers	H	0–0	8,507	
33	28 February 2004	Grimsby Town	A	1–6	5,603	Nardiello
34	2 March 2004	Peterborough United	H	0–1	7,574	
35	6 March 2004	Luton Town	H	0–0	8,685	
36	13 March 2004	Sheffield Wednesday	A	1–2	25,664	Williams
37	16 March 2004	Oldham Athletic	A	1–1	5,837	Nardiello
38	20 March 2004	Port Vale	H	0–0	8,267	
39	27 March 2004	Swindon Town	A	1–1	7,305	Nardiello
40	3 April 2004	Plymouth Argyle	H	1–0	9,266	Birch
41	10 April 2004	Rushden & Diamonds	A	3–2	4,063	Betsy, Murphy, Neil
42	12 April 2004	Queens Park Rangers	H	3–3	10,402	Murphy, Nardiello, Ireland
43	17 April 2004	Brentford	H	0–2	9,824	
44	24 April 2004	Tranmere Rovers	A	0–2	7,612	
45	2 May 2004	Bristol City	H	0–1	10,865	
46	8 May 2004	Stockport County	A	3–2	6,581	Wroe, Birch, Neil

=== FA Cup ===
Match	Date	Opponent	Venue	Result	Attendance	Scorers
R1	16 November 2003	York City	A	2–1	5,658	Betsy, Rankin
R2	6 December 2003	Bristol City	A	0–0	6,741	
R2 Replay	4 January 2004	Bristol City	H	2–1	5,434	Kay, Monk
R3	3 January 2004	Scunthorpe United	H	0–0	10,839	
R3 Replay	13 January 2004	Scunthorpe United	A	0–2	6,293	

=== Football League Cup ===
Match	Date	Opponent	Venue	Result	Attendance	Scorers
R1	12 August 2003	Blackpool	H	1–2	5,378	Gorré

=== Football League Trophy ===
Match	Date	Opponent	Venue	Result	Attendance	Scorers
R1	15 October 2003	Notts County	A	0 – 0 (4 – 2 pens)	1,220	
R2	12 November 2003	Sheffield Wednesday	A	0–1	13,575	

== Squad statistics ==
No.	Pos.	Name	League		FA Cup		League Cup		Other		Total	
No.	Pos.	Name	Apps	Goals	Apps	Goals	Apps	Goals	Apps	Goals	Apps	Goals
1	GK	(England) Marlon Beresford	14	0	0	0	0	0	0	0	14	0
1	GK	(Serbia and Montenegro) Saša Ilić	25	0	5	0	1	0	2	0	33	0
2	DF	(England) Neil Austin	35(5)	0	4(1)	0	0(1)	0	0(1)	0	39(7)	0
3	DF	(England) Tony Gallimore	20	0	2	0	1	0	2	0	25	0
4	DF	(Scotland) Peter Handyside	28	0	2	0	1	0	1	0	32	0
5	DF	(England) Lee Crooks	20(3)	0	1	0	0	0	2	0	23(3)	0
6	MF	(England) Steve Hayward	24(8)	1	4	0	1	0	1	0	30(8)	1
7	MF	(Australia) Jacob Burns	16(6)	1	4	0	0	0	1	0	21(6)	1
7	MF	(New Zealand) Dave Mulligan	2(2)	0	0	0	0	0	0	0	2(2)	0
8	MF	(England) Chris Lumsdon	17(11)	3	1(3)	0	0(1)	0	1(1)	0	19(16)	3
9	FW	(England) Mark Stallard	10	1	0	0	0	0	0	0	10	1
9	FW	(New Zealand) Rory Fallon	12(4)	4	0	0	1	0	1	0	14(4)	4
10	MF	(Seychelles) Kevin Betsy	42(3)	10	5	1	1	0	2	0	50(3)	11
11	FW	(England) Michael Boulding	5(1)	0	0	0	0	0	0	0	5(1)	0
11	MF	(Northern Ireland) Stephen Carson	9(2)	1	3(1)	0	0	0	1(1)	0	13(4)	1
12	FW	(England) Gary Birch	8	2	0	0	0	0	0	0	8	2
12	FW	(Republic of Ireland) Jonathan Walters	7(1)	0	3	0	0	0	0(1)	0	10(2)	0
12	FW	(Wales) Arron Davies	1(3)	0	0	0	0	0	0	0	1(3)	0
13	GK	(England) Danny Alcock	0(1)	0	0	0	0	0	0	0(1)	0	0
14	DF	(England) Garry Monk	14(3)	0	4	1	0	0	0	0	18(3)	1
14	DF	(England) Paul Gibbs	0(3)	0	0	0	0	0	0	0	0(3)	0
15	MF	(England) Antony Kay	39(4)	3	5	1	0	1	0	2	47(4)	4
16	DF	(Scotland) Alex Neil	17(14)	2	1(2)	0	0	0	0	0	18(16)	2
17	DF	(Republic of Ireland) Brian O'Callaghan	25(4)	0	4(1)	0	1	0	2	0	32(5)	0
18	MF	(England) Chris Shuker	9	0	0	0	0	0	0	0	9	0
18	MF	(England) Gary Jones	0	0	0	0	0	0	0	0	0	0
19	FW	(England) Paul Warhurst	3(1)	0	0	0	0	0	0	0	3(1)	0
19	FW	(Wales) Daniel Nardiello	14(2)	7	0	0	0	0	0	0	14(2)	7
20	DF	(Scotland) Craig Ireland	43	3	5	0	1	0	2	0	51	3
21	MF	(England) Tom Baker	0(1)	0	0	0	0	0	0	0	0(1)	0
22	MF	(Grenada) Craig Rocastle	4(1)	0	0	0	0	0	0	0	4(1)	0
22	GK	(England) Tony Caig	3	0	0	0	0	0	0	0	3	0
22	DF	(England) David Murphy	10	2	0	0	0	0	0	0	10	2
23	DF	(England) Dale Tonge	0(1)	0	0	0	0	0	0	0	0(1)	0
23	MF	(England) Carl Barrowclough	0	0	0	0	0	0	0	0	0	0
24	DF	(England) Ryan Laight	0	0	0	0	0	0	0	0	0	0
24	MF	(Australia) Daniel Clitnovici	2(3)	0	0	0	0	0	2	0	2(3)	0
25	DF	(England) Rob Atkinson	0(1)	0	0	0	0	0	0	0	0(1)	0
25	MF	(England) Kevin Donovan	0	0	0	0	0	0	0	0	0	0
26	GK	(England) Ross Turnbull	3	0	0	0	0	0	0	0	3	0
26	MF	(England) Kevin Dixon	0	0	0	0	0	0	0	0	0	0
27	FW	(England) Nathan Jarman	0	0	0	0	0	0	0	0	0	0
28	GK	(England) Gavin Ward	1	0	0	0	0	0	0	0	1	0
31	MF	(England) Nicky Wroe	1(1)	1	0	0	0	0	0	0	1(1)	1
32	FW	(England) Isaiah Rankin	9(11)	5	2(1)	1	0(1)	0	1(1)	0	12(14)	6
33	MF	(Netherlands) Dean Gorré	16(3)	7	0	0	1	1	1	0	18(3)	8
34	DF	(England) Robbie Williams	3(1)	1	0	0	0	0	0	0	3(1)	1
37	GK	(England) Scott Flinders	0	0	0	0	0	0	0	0	0	0
