= Dan Gallimore =

English footballer

Personal information
- Full name: Daniel James Gallimore
- Date of birth: 21 March 2003 (age 23)
- Place of birth: Grimsby, England
- Position: Midfielder

Team information
- Current team: Cleethorpes Town

Youth career
- 2011–2021: Scunthorpe United

Senior career*
Years	Team	Apps	(Gls)
2021–2023	Scunthorpe United	21	(0)
2023	→ Cleethorpes Town (loan)	13	(0)
2023–	Cleethorpes Town	0	(0)
- * Club domestic league appearances and goals as of 16:39, 6 May 2023 (UTC)

Daniel James Gallimore (born 21 March 2003) is an English professional footballer who plays as a midfielder for Cleethorpes Town.

He has previously played as a professional in the Football League for Scunthorpe United.

== Career ==
=== Scunthorpe United ===
Born in Grimsby, Gallimore joined Scunthorpe United's youth academy in 2011 before signing his first professional contract with the club in May 2021. He made his debut for the club in a 3–0 EFL Trophy defeat to Manchester City U23 on 24 August 2021, before making his league debut four days later as a substitute in a 1–0 win over Tranmere Rovers.

In February 2023, Gallimore signed for Northern Premier League Division One East club Cleethorpes Town on loan until the end of the season. Following Scunthorpe's relegation to the National League North, he was released at the end of the 2022–23 season.

=== Cleethorpes Town ===
Following his release by Scunthorpe, Gallimore returned to Cleethorpes Town on a permanent transfer.

== Personal life ==
Gallimore is the son of former Grimsby Town defender Tony Gallimore.
