= Tony Gallimore =

English footballer

Personal information
- Full name: Anthony Mark Gallimore
- Date of birth: 21 February 1972 (age 54)
- Place of birth: Crewe, England
- Position: Defender

Youth career
- 1988–1989: Stoke City

Senior career*
Years	Team	Apps	(Gls)
1990–1993	Stoke City	11	(0)
1991	→ Carlisle United (loan)	8	(0)
1992	→ Carlisle United (loan)	8	(0)
1993–1996	Carlisle United	124	(9)
1996–2003	Grimsby Town	273	(4)
2003–2004	Barnsley	20	(0)
2004–2006	Rochdale	68	(0)
2006–2007	Northwich Victoria	12	(1)
2007	→ Hucknall Town (loan)		
Total		524	(14)
- * Club domestic league appearances and goals

Anthony Mark Gallimore (born 21 February 1972) is an English former professional footballer who played as a left back from 1990 to 2007.

He began his career with Stoke City in 1990 and subsequently spent two separate loan spells with Carlisle United in 1991 and 1992. He joined United on a permanent deal a year later and went on to spend three years at Brunton Park before joining Grimsby Town in 1996. It was at Grimsby where he arguably played some of his best football, during the 1997–98 season the club earned promotion via the play-offs as well as a few weeks earlier being victorious in the Football League Trophy. He departed Grimsby in 2003 after spending seven seasons at Blundell Park, his next port of call was league rivals Barnsley where he remained for a year before joining Rochdale. Having spent two seasons with Dale, Gallimore dropped out of professional football and signed with non-league Northwich Victoria in 2006. He finished his seventeen-year career whilst on loan with Hucknall Town in 2007. During his career he made more than 500 appearances in the Football League.

After retiring Gallimore returned to live in Grimsby where he works as a scaffolder.

== Career ==
=== Stoke City ===
Gallimore joined Stoke City as a youngster and progressed into the club's first team setup in 1990 after several seasons in the youth system. He made his debut as a substitute against Blackburn Rovers towards the end of the 1989–90 season. He made seven appearances in 1990–91 and struggled to establish himself under Lou Macari in 1991–92 making just three appearances and was twice loaned out to Carlisle United in 1991 and again in 1992, making 8 appearances for Carlisle each time round.

=== Carlisle United ===
In March 1993, Carlisle paid £15,000 for Gallimore to register the left back as a permanent player at Brunton Park. He went on to make over 150 appearances in all competitions for United and was an integral part of the first team. This in turn would sound the alerts of bigger teams, and in March 1996, he made a £125,000 move to Grimsby Town who at the time were playing their football in the First Division.

=== Grimsby Town ===
At Blundell Park he would turn out to be the club's long-term replacement for departing left back Gary Croft who had left Grimsby in a multimillion-pound deal to join Blackburn Rovers. After playing out the last few games of the 1995–96 campaign, Gallimore would prepare himself for a tough first full season, with The Mariners losing their first division status, and suffering a relegation, this spelled the end of an era at the club and important key players such as John Oster and Clive Mendonca moved on to new clubs. In the 1997–98 season, Gallimore would play an important role in the club's sudden return to the first division, whilst beating Northampton Town at Wembley Stadium in the play-offs, the club also defeated AFC Bournemouth in the Football League Trophy at the same venue. Gallimore along with fellow defenders John McDermott, Peter Handyside and Mark Lever as well as goalkeeper Aidan Davison were noted as the strongest defensive line up in the Second Division that year, and one of the strongest in the whole country. Gallimore went on to play the next five seasons at Grimsby and featured as the club's main choice left back until his departure at the end of the 2002–03 season, when Grimsby were to lose their first division status once more. Injury had troubled Gallimore in parts of his last couple of seasons with Grimsby, and his place had been contested by youngster Ben Chapman and also with the arrival of Darren Barnard in 2002, Gallimore had struggled to hold his place down in the team. With the club relegated, Grimsby opted not to renew his contract and he left the club after featuring in seven different seasons for The Mariners.

=== Barnsley ===
In August 2003 he signed a one-year deal with Grimsby's rivals Barnsley along with former teammate Peter Handyside. He went on to feature in just over 20 games for the club as yet again, injury blighted his season. At the end of the season, Gallimore was released again and dropped down another league to join Rochdale in August 2004.

=== Rochdale ===
Dale at that time were managed by Steve Parkin, who previously managed Gallimore at Barnsley. He featured regularly for the club before being released at the end of the 2005–06 season.

=== Northwich Victoria ===
Gallimore joined Conference side Northwich Victoria in June 2006, but found it hard to break into the side and was transfer listed a few months later. He then made a loan move to Conference North side Hucknall Town in January 2007, where he spent two months before being recalled by Northwich in March 2007. Gallimore retired from professional football in May 2007 following the close of the 2006–07 campaign.

== Personal life ==
After retiring from Football in 2007, Gallimore went on to work for a scaffolding firm based in Grimsby. In December 2009, Gallimore signed for Grimsby and Cleethorpes Sunday League side Aston Estates.

His son, Dan Gallimore plays for Cleethorpes Town.

In 2017, Gallimore lost a part of his right thumb in a workplace accident at Seachill in Grimsby, in which he was working on an extraction fan which should have been isolated.

== Career statistics ==
Club	Season	League			FA Cup		League Cup		Other^{[A]}		Total	
Club	Season	Division	Apps	Goals	Apps	Goals	Apps	Goals	Apps	Goals	Apps	Goals
Stoke City	1989–90	Second Division	1	0	0	0	0	0	0	0	1	0
Stoke City	1990–91	Third Division	7	0	0	0	0	0	0	0	7	0
Stoke City	1991–92	Third Division	3	0	0	0	0	0	0	0	3	0
Stoke City	Total		11	0	0	0	0	0	0	0	11	0
Carlisle United	1991–92	Fourth Division	16	0	0	0	0	0	0	0	16	0
Carlisle United	1992–93	Third Division	8	1	0	0	0	0	0	0	8	1
Carlisle United	1993–94	Third Division	40	1	3	1	2	0	9	0	54	2
Carlisle United	1994–95	Third Division	40	5	4	0	4	0	8	1	56	6
Carlisle United	1995–96	Second Division	36	2	1	0	2	0	7	0	46	2
Carlisle United	Total		124	9	8	1	8	0	24	1	164	11
Grimsby Town	1995–96	First Division	10	1	0	0	0	0	0	0	10	1
Grimsby Town	1996–97	First Division	42	1	1	0	2	0	0	0	45	1
Grimsby Town	1997–98	Second Division	35	2	6	0	5	0	10	0	56	2
Grimsby Town	1998–99	First Division	43	0	1	0	5	0	0	0	49	0
Grimsby Town	1999–2000	First Division	39	0	1	0	2	1	0	0	43	1
Grimsby Town	2000–01	First Division	28	0	2	0	2	1	0	0	32	1
Grimsby Town	2001–02	First Division	38	0	2	0	3	0	0	0	43	0
Grimsby Town	2002–03	First Division	38	0	2	0	1	0	0	0	41	0
Grimsby Town	Total		273	4	15	0	20	2	10	0	318	6
Barnsley	2003–04	Second Division	20	0	2	0	1	0	2	0	25	0
Rochdale	2004–05	League Two	34	0	2	0	1	0	2	0	38	0
Rochdale	2005–06	League Two	34	0	1	0	1	0	1	0	37	0
Rochdale	Total		68	0	3	0	2	0	3	0	76	0
Northwich Victoria	2006–07	Conference National	12	1	0	0	0	0	0	0	12	1
Career Total			508	14	28	1	31	2	39	1	606	18

A. The "Other" column constitutes appearances and goals in the Football League Trophy and Football League play-offs.

== Honours ==
Carlisle United

- Football League Third Division: 1994–95
- Football League Trophy runner-up: 1994–95

Grimsby Town

- Football League Second Division play-offs: 1998
- Football League Trophy: 1997–98

Individual

- PFA Team of the Year: 1994–95 Third Division

== External sources ==
Tony Gallimore at Soccerbase
