= Richard Smith (footballer, born 1970) =

English footballer

Personal information
- Full name: Richard Geoffrey Smith
- Date of birth: 3 October 1970 (age 56)
- Place of birth: Lutterworth, England
- Height: 5 ft 11 in (1.80 m)
- Position: Central defender

Youth career
- 1985–1988: Leicester City

Senior career*
Years	Team	Apps	(Gls)
1988–1996	Leicester City	98	(1)
1989	→ Nuneaton Borough (loan)		
1989	→ Cambridge United (loan)	4	(0)
1995	→ Grimsby Town (loan)	8	(0)
1996–2001	Grimsby Town	78	(1)
Total		188	(2)
- * Club domestic league appearances and goals

Richard Geoffrey Smith (born 3 October 1970) is an English former professional footballer who played as a defender from 1988 until 2001.

He notably played in the Premier League for Leicester City, having also played for Nuneaton Borough and Cambridge United on loan. He joined Grimsby Town in 1996 and remained with the club until 2001 where he then retired through injury.

== Career ==
=== Leicester City ===
Born in Lutterworth, Leicestershire Smith joined Leicester City as a junior and came through the club's youth setup. In 1988, he was added to the first team squad by then manager David Pleat. He went on to play under Brian Little, Mark McGhee and Martin O'Neill at Filbert Street and spent a loan spell with Cambridge United in 1989. He played in one Premier League season with The Foxes, the 1994–1995 season when the club were relegated to the First Division. He would go on to make 120 first team appearances in all competitions, scoring twice.

=== Grimsby Town ===
In September 1995, Smith was loaned to fellow First Division side Grimsby Town. He would make 8 appearances for Brian Laws side during this spell which led to him joining the club permanently in March 1996 when Leicester and Grimsby agreed a £50,000 transfer fee. In his time at Grimsby he was in and out of the team both under Laws and his replacement Alan Buckley. The Mariners defensive set up in the mid to late nineties had boasted such club legends as Mark Lever, Peter Handyside, John McDermott, Graham Rodger and Kevin Jobling, so Smith was dipped in and out of the first team. The club were eventually relegated to the Second Division in May 1997, only to bounce back the following season by winning the Second Division Play-Off Final at Wembley Stadium. Town had also triumphed in the Football League Trophy that season, but injury had forced Smith to miss the entire season.

During his final three seasons at Grimsby, Smith continued to play a cameo role in the first team with numerous injury problems preventing him from having any lengthy spell in the team. In his final season the 2000-2001 campaign, he managed only 7 games, scoring once. In what would be his final game in professional football he played the full 90 minutes of an FA Cup third round reply defeat at home to Wycombe Wanderers on 16 January 2001. His final goal had come earlier in that season during a 2–2 away draw with Wimbledon F.C. The Mariners now managed by Lennie Lawrence saw fit to release Smith from his contract in June 2001 due to his ongoing injury concerns, this eventually led to his retirement from professional football at the age of 30.

== Personal life ==
Smith now runs and owns BASH Skip Hire based in Broughton Astley, Leicestershire.

== Honours ==
Leicester City

- Football League First Division play-off winner: 1993–94

Grimsby Town

- Football League Trophy: winner 1997–98
- Football League Second Division play-off winner: 1997–98
