= Zhang Enhua =

Chinese footballer and coach (1973–2021)

Zhang Enhua 张恩华
Personal information
- Date of birth: 28 April 1973
- Place of birth: Dalian, Liaoning, China
- Date of death: 29 April 2021 (aged 48)
- Place of death: Shenzhen, Guangdong, China
- Height: 1.82 m (6 ft 0 in)
- Position: Defender

Senior career*
| Years | Team | Apps | (Gls) |
| 1994–2003 | Dalian Wanda | 178 | (16) |
| 2000–2001 | → Grimsby Town (loan) | 17 | (3) |
| 2004–2005 | Tianjin Teda | 11 | (1) |
| 2005–2006 | South China | 7 | (0) |
| Total | | 213 | (20) |

International career
| 1995–2002 | China | 65 | (6) |
Medal record
Men's football
Representing China
Asian Games
| Bronze medal – third place | 1998 Bangkok | Football |
East Asian Games
| Bronze medal – third place | 1993 Shanghai | Football |
- * Club domestic league appearances and goals

Zhang Enhua (simplified Chinese: 张恩华; traditional Chinese: 張恩華; pinyin: Zhāng Ēnhuá; 28 April 1973 – 29 April 2021) was a Chinese professional football player and coach. As a player, he was a defender from 1994 to 2006 and represented Dalian Wanda, Grimsby Town, Tianjin Teda and South China while internationally he was a participant at the 2002 FIFA World Cup.

== Club career ==
=== Dalian Wanda ===
Zhang Enhua began his professional football career when he joined his local native Chinese football team Dalian Wanda at the beginning of the 1994 league season. At the club, he would gradually establish himself in defence and help it win the league title. With Dalian he would establish himself as an integral member of their defence the following season, however they were unable to retain the league title and came third within the league. Nevertheless, the following season would see Zhang Enhua help Dalian stamp their dominance within the league and for the next three seasons they would win consecutive league titles.

=== Grimsby Town ===
In 2000, Zhang was made a transfer target of second tier English club Grimsby Town and was then brought to the club on a 3-month loan deal to play in the Football League Championship. The defender would be part of a new wave of foreign imports at the club as newly installed manager Lennie Lawrence brought in David Nielsen, Knut Anders Fostervold and Menno Willems. Enhua was originally sent in as cover for the injured Peter Handyside, and after a nervous first game, he settled into life at Grimsby, even scoring three times for the club. Lawrence admitted talking to the club over a possible deal being made more permanent but his wages were too big for the club, and Enhua departed the club after his loan spell. He is still regarded as a minor cult hero amongst Grimsby supporters, who took very well to the player while he played in England. His goal celebration in the 1–0 victory over Burnley was used by ITV Yorkshire Television in the opening credits for their "Goals on Sunday" television programme throughout the 2001–02 season.

=== Return to China ===
Zhang returned to China to play for Dalian Wanda (who had renamed themselves Dalian Shide) once more in time to help win another league title and would also be named in the Chinese squad for the 2002 FIFA World Cup. Following his departure from Dalian in 2003, Zhang went on to play for Tianjin Teda for several seasons before joining Hong Kong football team South China in 2005 to extend his football career.

== International career ==
Zhang Enhua would make his international debut against South Korea in a 0–0 draw on 19 February 1995 in the Dynasty Cup. After several further friendlies his performances would be impressive enough to see him included in the 1996 AFC Asian Cup squad, however, while he would score his debut goal for his country against Saudi Arabia in the quarter-finals he would, unfortunately, see his team lose 4–3 and get knocked out of the competition. A firm member of the national team he would play a large part in the 1998 FIFA World Cup qualification (AFC) campaign that saw China narrowly miss out on a World Cup spot. He was, however, able to help China qualify for the 2000 AFC Asian Cup and while he started in the early stages he would miss the knock out stages of the competition and only play in the Third place play-off game which China lost 1–0.

On 19 May 2002, Zhang was included in China's 23-man squad for the 2002 FIFA World Cup, but eventually did not make an appearance in the tournament as China was knocked out in the group stage.

== Coaching career ==
Enhua retired in 2006 and took up coaching in Hong Kong. On 2 March 2011, it was announced that Enhua would be returning to England to complete his coaching badges with the Football Association, and that he would return to former club Grimsby Town as a special guest for the club's home fixture with AFC Wimbledon on 5 March.

Upon his return to Grimsby he presented the club with a gift that included Chinese writing which translated into 'it might be a long road back, but you can do it and will achieve success eventually'. He also described his visit to the club as a homecoming.

== Death ==
Enhua died on 29 April 2021, one day after his 48th birthday. The cause of his death was reported to be cardiac arrest led by excessive drinking during his birthday party.

== Career statistics ==
Appearances and goals by national team and year
| National team | Year | Apps | Goals |
|---|---|---|---|
| China | 1995 | 3 | 0 |
| China | 1996 | 5 | 2 |
| China | 1997 | 21 | 2 |
| China | 1998 | 13 | 1 |
| China | 1999 | 0 | 0 |
| China | 2000 | 13 | 1 |
| China | 2001 | 4 | 1 |
| China | 2002 | 3 | 0 |
| Total | | 62 | 7 |

| No. | Date | Venue | Opponent | Score | Result | Competition |
|---|---|---|---|---|---|---|
| 1. | 16 December 1996 | Zayed Sports City Stadium, Abu Dhabi, UAE | Saudi Arabia | 1–0 | 3–4 | 1996 AFC Asian Cup |
| 2. | 16 December 1996 | Zayed Sports City Stadium, Abu Dhabi, UAE | Saudi Arabia | 3–4 | 3–4 | 1996 AFC Asian Cup |
| 3. | 3 October 1997 | Jinzhou Stadium, Dalian, China | Saudi Arabia | 1–0 | 1–0 | 1998 FIFA World Cup qualification |
| 4. | 1 March 1998 | International Stadium Yokohama, Yokohama, Japan | Hong Kong | 1–0 | 1–0 | 1998 Dynasty Cup |
| 5. | 29 January 2000 | Thong Nhat Stadium, Ho Chi Minh City, Vietnam | Vietnam | 2–0 | 2–0 | 2000 AFC Asian Cup qualification |
| 6. | 3 August 2001 | Shanghai Stadium, Shanghai, China | North Korea | 2–1 | 2–2 (a.e.t.) (2–4 p) | 2001 Four Nations Tournament |

== Honours ==
Dalian Wanda

- Chinese Jia-A League: 1994, 1996, 1997, 1998, 2000, 2001, 2002
- Chinese FA Cup: 2001
- Chinese Super Cup: 1997, 2003
