= Craig Ireland =

Scottish footballer (born 1975)

Personal information
- Full name: Craig Robert Ireland
- Date of birth: 29 November 1975 (age 50)
- Place of birth: Dundee, Scotland
- Position: Defender

Senior career*
Years	Team	Apps	(Gls)
1994–1996	Aberdeen	0	(0)
1996–1999	Dunfermline	52	(2)
1999	→ Dundee (loan)	4	(1)
1999–2001	Dundee	10	(0)
2000	→ Airdrieonians (loan)	12	(2)
2001	→ Notts County (loan)	16	(0)
2001–2003	Notts County	64	(2)
2003–2004	Barnsley	43	(3)
2004–2005	Peterborough United	23	(0)
2005	→ Bristol City (loan)	5	(0)
2005–2007	Falkirk	23	(1)
- * Club domestic league appearances and goals

Craig Robert Ireland (born 29 November 1975) is a Scottish retired professional footballer.

Ireland began his a career at Aberdeen, although he only made one League Cup appearance during his time at the club. He moved to Dunfermline Athletic in February 1996 for £75,000 and would make 56 appearances in total for the Pars. His spell with Dundee began initially on loan in October 1999, then as a £50,000 transfer that December. In November 1999 he scored one of the goals as Dundee won 2–1 against Rangers at Ibrox. However he did not prove a great success at Dens Park so joined Airdrieonians and Notts County on loan respectively, making a permanent move to the latter.

He continued playing in England after leaving Notts, having spells at Barnsley, Peterborough United and Bristol City. On 13 June 2005 he returned to Scotland, joining Scottish Premier League side Falkirk on a free transfer. He would only play one season for the Bairns, scoring once against Inverness Caledonian Thistle, and spent another on the sidelines before being forced to retire through injury in April 2007.

== Honours ==
Airdrieonians

- Scottish Challenge Cup: 2000–01
