= Jamie Forrester =

English footballer

Personal information
- Date of birth: 1 November 1974 (age 51)
- Place of birth: Bradford, England
- Height: 5 ft 6 in (1.68 m)
- Position: Striker

Youth career
- AJ Auxerre
- Leeds United

Senior career*
Years	Team	Apps	(Gls)
1992–1995	Leeds United	9	(0)
1994	→ Southend United (loan)	5	(0)
1995	→ Grimsby Town (loan)	9	(1)
1995–1997	Grimsby Town	41	(6)
1997–1999	Scunthorpe United	101	(37)
1999–2000	FC Utrecht	1	(0)
1999–2000	→ Walsall (loan)	5	(0)
2000	→ Northampton Town (loan)	9	(6)
2000–2003	Northampton Town	112	(39)
2003–2004	Hull City	32	(7)
2004–2006	Bristol Rovers	52	(9)
2006	→ Lincoln City (loan)	9	(5)
2006–2008	Lincoln City	81	(30)
2008–2009	Notts County	30	(8)
2009–2010	Lincoln United		
2010	Lincoln Moorlands Railway		
Total		496	(148)

International career
1993	England U18	2	(0)
- * Club domestic league appearances and goals

Jamie Forrester (born 1 November 1974) is an English former professional footballer who played as a striker between 1991 and 2010.

He played in France, the Netherlands and his native England. He notably played for Grimsby Town, Scunthorpe United, Northampton Town and Lincoln City, having also had spells with AJ Auxerre, Leeds United, FC Utrecht, Walsall, Hull City, Bristol Rovers, Notts County, Lincoln United and Lincoln Moorlands Railway. Forrester has since set up home in Lincoln and runs his own key cutting business as well as coaching youngsters in the city.

== Career ==
=== AJ Auxerre ===
At the age of 16, Forrester moved south of England to France, where he was to ply his trade for Auxerre, a team with unprecedented success for the size of their town. However, "after a year of homesickness", Forrester returned to Leeds in an attempt to break into their first team, after failing to make any first team appearances.

=== Leeds United ===
Whilst at Leeds, Forrester had two relatively successful loan spells at Southend United and Grimsby Town, however, only managed to bag 9 first team appearances for The Whites, stating he "was not able to consistently perform at the top level". This eventually led him to join Grimsby Town on a permanent basis.

His highlight whilst at Elland Road was undoubtedly winning the FA Youth Cup in 1993, helping to defeat a Manchester United squad 4–1 on aggregate over a two-legged final, scoring Leeds' first goals in both their 2–0 victory at Old Trafford and their 2–1 win at Elland Road. Forrester scored a total of 11 goals in 1993's FA Youth Cup for the Yorkshire outfit. This Manchester United team contained players who were to become internationals, including David Beckham, Paul Scholes, Gary Neville, Phil Neville, Nicky Butt, Robbie Savage and Keith Gillespie.

=== Grimsby Town ===
The Mariners had seen enough in Forrester's loan spell to offer him a permanent deal, and in the 1995/96, his contributions to the club were justly recognised as he received the Grimsby Town Supporters Young Player of the Year award. Despite this, his goal:game ratio was somewhat poor, which led to Forrester joining Grimsby's Lincolnshire rivals, Scunthorpe United.

=== Scunthorpe United ===
Forrester's spell at The Iron was arguably his most successful spell at a club. He quoted "Joining Scunthorpe was the best football decision I have made because it allowed me to play first team football on a regular basis and this is where I 'came of age' as a footballer." Despite being a firm favourite at Scunthorpe, another opportunity for him to play abroad came along, this time at the reasonably successful F.C. Utrecht of Holland.

=== FC Utrecht ===
Those at the Stadion Galgenwaard obviously saw enough potential in Forrester to take him on under the Bosman ruling, however, once again his spell away from home was short-lived, stating "things never really worked out in Holland." And after only one first team appearance to his name, and two short loan spells at Walsall and Northampton Town, Forrester headed back to England to play for Northampton on a permanent basis.

=== Northampton Town ===
In terms of success, Forrester's spell at Northampton was very similar to that of Scunthorpe. Scoring a goal every other game and winning promotion with The Cobblers rivalled his success at The Iron. His impressive displays led Peter Taylor, manager of the uprising Hull City, to hand him a contract.

=== Hull City ===
Hull City were by no means like a club who Forrester had played for before, they were playing in the fourth tier of English football, yet according to Forrester, were a "different animal". This was perhaps why Forrester's first team appearances were limited for The Tigers. Being surplus to requirements at the KC Stadium, despite being named in the Hull squad for every game of the 2003–04 season. Forrester scored against previous club Northampton Town in a 5–1 mauling of his old side for Hull City but was still applauded by the Northampton fans, showing the respect his attitude won. Forrester soon found a new club, this time Bristol Rovers.

=== Bristol Rovers ===
Forrester's time at The Pirates was somewhat frustrating, only managing to bag a handful of goals in 52 appearances. He was farmed out on loan to Lincoln City and scored 5 goals in 9 appearances, helping them reach the League Two Play-off semi-finals. His performances whilst on loan at Sincil Bank won him instant respect, and led him to sign a permanent deal for the Lincolnshire outfit shortly after.

=== Lincoln City ===
Having already played for Scunthorpe United and Grimsby Town, Forrester was no stranger to playing football in Lincolnshire. Despite the fact that he did not gain promotion with The Imps, his goal:game ratio was that of a goal every other game and he was a very influential figure in a side which pushed for promotion for two seasons whilst he served at the club. During his first full season at the club, the 2006–07 season, Forrester scored three hat-tricks in the opening stages and went on to be the club's top scorer. In May 2008, Forrester was offered a year-long extension to his Lincoln contract, although this was not accepted and he decided to join League Two rivals Notts County to the dismay of the Lincoln faithful.

=== Notts County ===
After failing to agree a new contract at the end of the 2007–08 season, on 11 June 2008 he signed a contract for Notts County. Forrester was released by the Meadow Lane club after the end of the 2008–09 season.

=== Lincoln United ===
On 6 August 2009, Forrester signed for Non League side Lincoln United, effectively dropping four levels down from League Two to play for United. In December 2009, Forrester and fellow former Lincoln City player Sam Mullarkey departed the club due to the desire of the club to trim the budget.

=== Lincoln Moorlands Railway ===
In April 2010, Forrester came out of retirement to play for Lincoln Moorlands Railway until the end of the season, debuting in the 3–0 home victory over Selby Town on 7 April 2010. He departed the club at the end of the 2009–10 season and returned to his retirement.

== Retirement ==
Upon his retirement, Forrester remained in Lincoln where he began to coach youngsters, as well as setting up his own company, Community Business Solutions Limited, a firm which specialises in reducing energy bills for its clients.

In June 2011 he hinted at a possible return to professional football after impressing in a match in memory of the late Richard Butcher, Forrester hinted that he would be tempted to re-sign for former club Lincoln City following their relegation to the Conference National a few months earlier.

In September 2011 Jamie began to work on new Sports Channel – Sports Tonight Live where he has turned his hand to TV presenting on The Basement Show, which takes a light-hearted look at Football Leagues 1 and 2

== Honours ==
Leeds United

- FA Youth Cup: 1992–93

Scunthorpe United

- Football League Third Division play-offs: 1999

Individual

- PFA Team of the Year: 1998–99 Third Division
