= Gary Childs =

English footballer (born 1964)

Personal information
- Full name: Gary Paul Colin Childs
- Date of birth: 19 April 1964 (age 62)
- Place of birth: Birmingham, England
- Height: 5 ft 7 in (1.70 m)
- Position: Midfielder

Youth career
- 1980–1982: West Bromwich Albion

Senior career*
Years	Team	Apps	(Gls)
1982–1983	West Bromwich Albion	3	(0)
1983–1987	Walsall	131	(17)
1987–1989	Birmingham City	55	(2)
1989–1997	Grimsby Town	233	(26)
1997–1998	Wisbech Town		
1998–2000	Boston United	46	(6)
Total		468	(56)

International career
1981–1982	England Youth	4	(0)

Managerial career
- 1997–1998: Wisbech Town (player-manager)
- * Club domestic league appearances and goals

Gary Paul Colin Childs (born 19 April 1964) is an English former professional footballer and coach.

Playing as a midfielder, he made 422 appearances and scored 45 goals in the Football League between 1982 and 1997 playing for West Bromwich Albion, Walsall, Birmingham City and Grimsby Town. before joining Boston United and then having a spell as manager of Wisbech Town. He went on to hold various positions within the youth system at Grimsby Town and work as sports development manager at Grimsby Institute of Further & Higher Education.

He represented England at youth level.

== Playing career ==
Childs was born in Kings Heath, Birmingham. He started his football career as a trainee with West Bromwich Albion, moving on for a fee of £15,000 to Walsall where he played 180 games in all competitions. A move to Birmingham City followed for a fee of £21,500, and two seasons later he joined Grimsby Town.He helped Grimsby to two successive promotions, from the Fourth Division in the 1989–90 season and from the Third Division the following year.

Released by Grimsby after eight years and nearly 300 games, Childs was appointed player-manager of Wisbech Town, newly elected to the Southern League Midland Division. He led the club to fifth place in the league and the second round proper of the FA Cup before poor form led to his dismissal. He then joined Boston United where he stayed until the end of the 1999–2000 season.

== Coaching career ==
He is a qualified coach, former community Officer at Grimsby Town, and Sports Development Manager at Grimsby Institute of Further & Higher Education.
