= Tommy Watson (footballer, born 1969) =

English footballer

Personal information
- Full name: Thomas Watson
- Date of birth: 29 September 1969 (age 57)
- Place of birth: Liverpool, England
- Position: Midfielder

Youth career
- 1986–1987: Grimsby Town

Senior career*
Years	Team	Apps	(Gls)
1988–1996	Grimsby Town	172	(24)
1995	→ Hull City (loan)	4	(0)
1998–2010	Cleethorpes Town		

Managerial career
- 1998–2010: Cleethorpes Town
- * Club domestic league appearances and goals

Thomas Watson (born 29 September 1969) is an English former professional footballer who played as a midfielder between 1988 and 2010 notably played for Grimsby Town. Watson also played for Hull City and went on to form, manage and play for Lincolnshire Soccer School, which is now known as Cleethorpes Town.

== Playing career ==
Liverpool-born Watson played for The Mariners as a youngster and was promoted to the club's first team squad in 1988. He could operate all over midfield but favoured to play on the right side of the flank. In 1995, he also spent time on loan with Hull City. He stayed with The Mariners up until 1996 when he retired due to injury.

== Coaching career ==
After retiring Watson formed his own football club in North East Lincolnshire named Lincolnshire Soccer School in 1998 which focused on both the men's and women's game ranging from ages 7 all the way up to the senior game. Watson played and managed the senior team from 1998 until 2010. In 2009 the club name changed to Cleethorpes Town Football Club.

== Honours ==
=== Grimsby Town ===
- Young Player Of The Season: 1988
- Football League Fourth Division runners up: 1989–90
