= Paul Crichton =

English footballer and coach (born 1968)

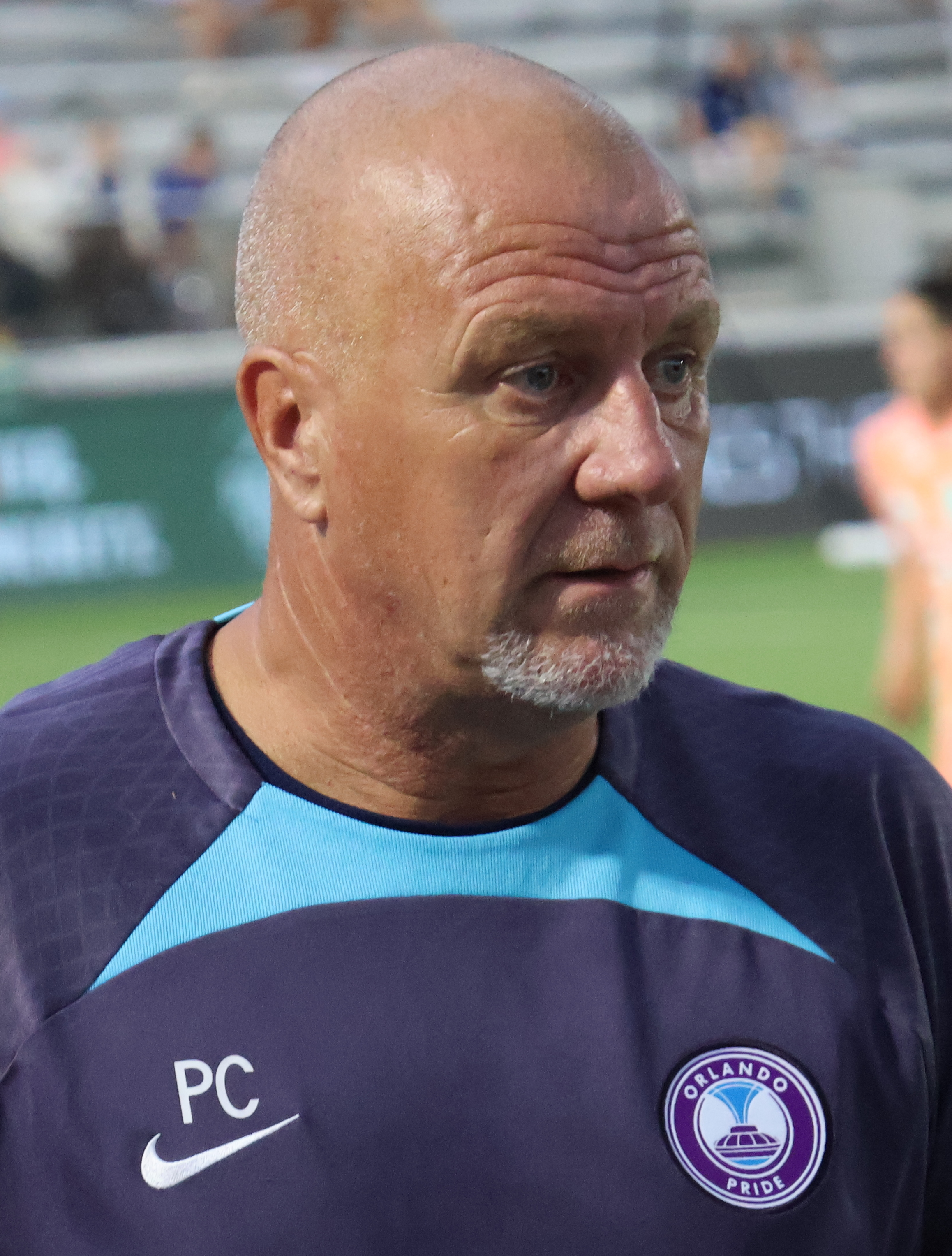
- Crichton with the Orlando Pride in 2024

Personal information
- Full name: Paul Andrew Crichton
- Date of birth: 3 October 1968 (age 58)
- Place of birth: Pontefract, England
- Height: 6 ft 1 in (1.85 m)
- Position: Goalkeeper

Youth career
- Nottingham Forest

Senior career*
Years	Team	Apps	(Gls)
1986–1988	Nottingham Forest	0	(0)
1986	→ Notts County (loan)	5	(0)
1987	→ Darlington (loan)	5	(0)
1987	→ Peterborough United (loan)	4	(0)
1987	→ Darlington (loan)	3	(0)
1987	→ Swindon Town (loan)	4	(0)
1988	→ Rotherham United (loan)	6	(0)
1988	→ Torquay United (loan)	13	(0)
1988–1990	Peterborough United	47	(0)
1990–1993	Doncaster Rovers	77	(0)
1993–1996	Grimsby Town	133	(0)
1996	→ West Bromwich Albion (loan)	5	(0)
1996–1998	West Bromwich Albion	27	(0)
1997	→ Aston Villa (loan)	0	(0)
1998	→ Burnley (loan)	1	(0)
1998	→ Burnley (loan)	0	(0)
1998–2001	Burnley	83	(0)
2001–2004	Norwich City	6	(0)
2004	York City	4	(0)
2004	Gainsborough Trinity	?	(?)
2004	Stafford Rangers	2	(0)
2004	Leigh RMI	4	(0)
2004–2005	Accrington Stanley	19	(0)
2005–2006	Gillingham	1	(0)
2006–2007	Cambridge United	32	(0)
2007	→ King's Lynn (loan)	?	(?)
2007–2008	King's Lynn	?	(?)
2008–2009	Brighton & Hove Albion	0	(0)
2010–2011	Sheffield United	0	(0)
Total		540	(0)

Managerial career
- 2019–2021: Miami FC (assistant head coach)
- * Club domestic league appearances and goals

Paul Andrew Crichton (born 3 October 1968) is an English football coach and former footballer. He is the goalkeeper coach of National Women's Soccer League club Orlando Pride.

Aa a player he was a goalkeeper from 1986 to 2011. During his playing career Crichton notably had lengthy spells with Grimsby Town, Doncaster Rovers, West Bromwich Albion and Burnley having also played as a professional for Nottingham Forest, Notts County, Darlington, Peterborough United, Swindon Town, Rotherham United, Aston Villa and Norwich City. He then moved into the Non-League game where he turned out for York City, Gainsborough Trinity, Stafford Rangers, Leigh RMI and Accrington Stanley.

Although never officially announcing his retirement, Crichton moved into coaching in 2005 and has since been the goalkeeping coach of Gillingham, Cambridge United, King's Lynn, Brighton & Hove Albion and Sheffield United as well as being registered as a player with each club.

== Playing career ==
=== Nottingham Forest ===
Crichton started his career as a trainee at Nottingham Forest club, turning professional in May 1986. While at Forest he was loaned out to six different clubs to gain experience, although he was never given an opportunity at Forest. The first of these loans, was with neighbours Notts County, which gave Crichton his league debut in September 1986. This was followed by further loans to Darlington in (January) and Peterborough United in (March). In September 1987 he rejoined Darlington, with further loans at Swindon Town in December 1987, and Rotherham United in March 1988. He joined Torquay United on loan in August 1988, playing 13 games at the start of the season, keeping Ken Veysey out of the side. He played well enough to attract attention from other clubs, and moved from Forest to Peterborough United in November on a free transfer.

=== Doncaster Rovers ===
He was released at the end of the following season and joined Doncaster Rovers in August 1990. On 15 September that year in a game against Rochdale at Spotland, Crichton achieved a rare if not unique feat by saving the same penalty three times. The referee had insisted it be retaken twice. Rovers went on to win 3–0. He appeared in 90 league and cup games for Doncaster.

=== Grimsby Town ===
He moved to Grimsby Town on a free transfer in July 1993. He was an ever-present in his first season at Blundell Park, hardly missing a game for 3 years until September 1996, when he moved to West Bromwich Albion for £250,000, playing under his former Grimsby manager Alan Buckley.

=== West Bromwich Albion ===
His spell at the Hawthorns was frustrating for Crichton as he played only 33 games in two years with the club and found himself playing second fiddle to Alan Miller, a goalkeeper signed for £400,000 shortly after Crichton's arrival. Crichton was again farmed out on loan, first for a week from 7 August 1997 to Aston Villa, as a standby goalkeeper while Mark Bosnich was injured, but manager Brian Little selected Michael Oakes in goal and Crichton never played a competitive game for Villa.

=== Burnley ===
He then joined Burnley on loan in August 1998, playing just once, in the opening game of the season, before being recalled to the Hawthorns after just 3 days.

He returned to Burnley in a permanent move on 19 November 1998, costing the Clarets £100,000 and quickly established himself in the Burnley side. He was an ever-present in the 1999–2000 season, as Burnley won promotion to Division One, but the following season lost his place to Greek international goalkeeper Nikolaos Michopoulos. His spell at Burnley may be remembered for his part in one of Burnley's worst ever spells in football. In February 1999, Burnley played Gillingham at Turf Moor, Gillingham won 5–0 with Robert Taylor scoring all 5 goals (at the time it was a post-war record for number of goals scored by one person on an away ground). Things went from bad to worst in the following fixture, again at home, this time to Manchester City as City won 6–0. Crichton was in goal for both games, and although the defence was perhaps more to blame than him, it was the most goals he had conceded in two games.

=== Latter career ===
On 22 June 2001 Norwich City paid £150,000 to sign him from Burnley. He was signed as a back-up goalkeeper, however, and spent his time playing understudy to Robert Green. After only 6 appearances in three seasons, Crichton joined York City on a free transfer in 2004, although he ended his final season at Norwich with a first division championship medal after the Canaries won promotion to the Premiership. However, he was sacked by York in September 2004 after an incident with a supporter, and joined Gainsborough Trinity. Later that month he joined Stafford Rangers, playing twice before leaving to seek a move to a club nearer his Norwich home. However, in early October 2004 he joined Leigh RMI, for whom he played five times before joining Accrington Stanley in November 2004.

It was from Accrington, and following almost twenty appearances, that Crichton returned to league football, joining Gillingham at the beginning of the 2005–06 season. Crichton was signed as back up to Jason Brown, but was also given his first official coaching role. His one appearance that season came in the home game against Yeovil Town, where he kept a clean sheet in a 0–0 draw.

== Coaching career ==
On 26 June it was announced that Crichton had left Priestfield and joined Cambridge United as a player-coach. In January 2007 he was loaned to King's Lynn until the end of the season, but remained as goalkeeping coach at Cambridge United. However, after Cambridge lost 5–0 twice in succession, Crichton was recalled from his loan, and was present in goal during the club record victory on 31 March 2007 (7–0 v. Weymouth). He was released by Cambridge in May 2007 and returned to King's Lynn on a permanent contract for the 2007–08 season, but was allowed to leave to join Brighton & Hove Albion as goalkeeping coach, to further his career. On 9 February 2009, he moved to take over as goalkeeping coach at Norwich City replacing Tommy Wright, after Bryan Gunn was appointed as manager. He left the club in February 2010, moving to Sheffield United to coach there, though was also registered as a player for emergencies for his first season. In July 2012 took up the goalkeeper coaching job at Championship club Huddersfield Town.

On 23 June 2014 he returned to former club Grimsby Town as the club's new goalkeeping coach. On 9 July, having only taken part in a week's worth of pre-season training, Crichton departed Grimsby and joined Blackpool in a similar role. On 7 August 2015 Crichton joined Queens Park Rangers, again as goalkeeping coach, and left the club on 28 January 2016.

After emigrating to the United States to open a soccer school, Crichton was appointed assistant coach of Miami FC, under manager Paul Dalglish. In March 2021, he joined the Washington Spirit of the National Women's Soccer League as a goalkeeping coach.

On 15 February 2023, it was confirmed Crichton had been appointed goalkeeper coach at National Women's Soccer League club Orlando Pride.

== Personal life ==
Crichton now lives in Port Orange, Florida and is a coach for PSA Soccer Academy and technical director for the Miami FC Academy.

== Honours ==
=== As a player ===
Grimsby Town

- Lincolnshire Senior Cup winner: 1993–94, 1994–95, 1995–96
- Supporters Player of the Year winner: 1994
