= Craig Shakespeare =

English footballer and manager (1963–2024)

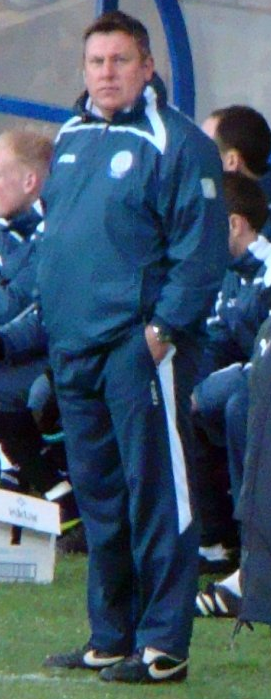
- Shakespeare with Leicester City in 2010

Personal information
- Full name: Craig Robert Shakespeare
- Date of birth: 26 October 1963
- Place of birth: Birmingham, England
- Date of death: 1 August 2024 (aged 60)
- Height: 5 ft 10 in (1.78 m)
- Position: Midfielder

Youth career
- 1979–1981: Walsall

Senior career*
Years	Team	Apps	(Gls)
1981–1989	Walsall	284	(45)
1989–1990	Sheffield Wednesday	17	(1)
1990–1993	West Bromwich Albion	112	(12)
1993–1997	Grimsby Town	106	(10)
1997–1998	Scunthorpe United	4	(0)
1998	Telford United	1	(1)
2000	Hednesford Town	1	(0)
Total		525	(68)

Managerial career
- 2006: West Bromwich Albion (caretaker)
- 2008–2010: Leicester City (assistant)
- 2010–2011: Hull City (assistant)
- 2011–2017: Leicester City (assistant)
- 2017: Leicester City
- 2019–2020: Watford (assistant)
- 2020–2021: Aston Villa (assistant)
- 2021–2022: Norwich City (assistant)
- 2023: Leicester City (assistant)
- * Club domestic league appearances and goals

Craig Robert Shakespeare (26 October 1963 – 1 August 2024) was an English professional footballer and coach best known for managing at the time Premier League club Leicester City in 2017.

A midfielder, Shakespeare began his playing career with Walsall, where he made over 350 appearances. After a brief spell with Sheffield Wednesday, he also made over 100 appearances for both West Bromwich Albion and Grimsby Town. He also played for Scunthorpe United before finishing his career in non-league football with Telford United and Hednesford Town.

As a coach, Shakespeare worked at West Bromwich Albion, Leicester City and Hull City. He was briefly caretaker manager at West Brom in 2006 and took a similar role at Leicester in February 2017 before he was appointed manager in March. He was appointed permanent manager of Leicester City on 8 June 2017 after signing a three-year deal. He later served as assistant manager for Everton, Watford, Aston Villa and the England national team.

== Playing career ==
In his playing days he was an attacking midfielder; he favoured his left foot and his preferred position was on the left side of midfield. He signed as an apprentice at Walsall in September 1979, turning professional in November 1981. Shakespeare rated his goal in a 2–2 League Cup draw against Chelsea in October 1984 as the best of his career. In 1987–88 he helped Walsall to win promotion to Division Two via the playoffs, an achievement which he has since described as his greatest in football. He played well over 350 games for the Saddlers, scoring 59 goals, and in 1989 he moved to Sheffield Wednesday, then in the First Division, for a fee of £300,000.

Shakespeare spent less than a year at Hillsborough, before moving to West Bromwich Albion for £275,000. He stayed at Albion for over three years, making 128 appearances in total and becoming the team's first choice penalty taker. He scored twice from the penalty spot in Albion's first ever game in the Third Division, a 6–3 victory over Exeter City in August 1991.

Albion were promoted in 1993, but Shakespeare moved to Grimsby Town, rejoining Alan Buckley under whom he had played at Walsall. He later moved on to Scunthorpe United, and also played for three non-league clubs before retiring.

== Coaching career ==
In 1999, he re-joined West Brom as Football in the Community Officer. In this role, he was responsible for promoting football at grass roots level in the local community. He later took up the post of academy coach, then in 2006 became Reserve Team Coach. In October 2006, following the departure of Bryan Robson and then his assistant Nigel Pearson (who had been caretaker manager for a period of four weeks), Shakespeare was given charge of the first team for one game pending the arrival of Tony Mowbray. The game was away to Crystal Palace; Albion won 2–0.

Shakespeare left Albion in June 2008 to become Pearson's assistant manager at Leicester City, a move that was confirmed on 1 July. As well as having worked together on the West Bromwich Albion coaching staff, the two had also played together at Sheffield Wednesday. Shakespeare once said that Pearson was the best captain he had ever played under.

Shakespeare then followed Pearson to Hull City, which lasted until 2011.

He then followed Pearson back to Leicester City when the latter was reappointed manager there in November 2011. Following Pearson's sacking in July 2015, Shakespeare remained as assistant manager to incoming manager Claudio Ranieri and the club were subsequently crowned English champions in 2015–16.

When Sam Allardyce was made England manager in 2016 Shakespeare took on a coaching position alongside his Leicester job, but left when Allardyce resigned after just one match.

Ranieri was sacked on 23 February 2017, with Leicester in 17th with 13 games remaining; Shakespeare took over as caretaker manager. His first game in charge was a 3–1 victory over Liverpool in the Premier League four days later. On 12 March, he was named as the new manager of Leicester City. On 18 March, Shakespeare became the first Premier League manager ever to achieve 3 goals per game in his first three matches in charge. Then on 1 April, he became the only English manager to win his first four league matches. Leicester finished the season in 12th place.

On 8 June 2017, Shakespeare signed a three-year deal to be the permanent manager for Leicester City. On 17 October 2017, he was dismissed after poor performances left the club in the bottom three of the Premier League.

On 1 December 2017, Shakespeare was appointed first team coach at Everton following the appointment of Sam Allardyce as manager the previous day. On 16 May 2018, Allardyce and his backroom staff, including Shakespeare, were dismissed by Everton.

On 6 December 2019, Shakespeare was reunited with Nigel Pearson once again, as he was named as assistant manager at Watford. He remained in this role until 19 July 2020, when Pearson and his backroom staff were sacked, despite there only being two games left in the season, and Watford being out of the relegation zone at that point. Watford went on to lose both their remaining games, and suffer relegation from the Premier League.

On 7 August 2020, Shakespeare was appointed assistant head coach to former Walsall teammate Dean Smith at Aston Villa, the team he supported growing up. Shakespeare parted company with Aston Villa on 8 November 2021, the day after Smith had left the club. A week later, Shakespeare was appointed assistant head coach to Smith at Norwich City. On 10 April 2023, Shakespeare was appointed assistant head coach at Leicester City, again under Smith.

== Personal life and death ==
On 12 October 2023, it was announced that Shakespeare had been diagnosed with cancer. He died on the morning of 1 August 2024, at the age of 60.

== Managerial statistics ==
Managerial record by team and tenure
Team	From	To	Record					Ref
Team	From	To	P	W	D	L	Win %	Ref
West Bromwich Albion (caretaker)	17 October 2006	18 October 2006	1	1	0	0	100.0	
Leicester City	23 February 2017	17 October 2017	26	11	6	9	42.3	
Total			27	12	6	9	44.4	—

== Honours ==
Walsall

- Football League Third Division play-offs: 1988
