= Mark Lever =

English footballer and coach

Personal information
- Date of birth: 29 March 1970 (age 56)
- Place of birth: Beverley, England
- Position: Centre back

Youth career
- Grimsby Town

Senior career*
Years	Team	Apps	(Gls)
1988–2000	Grimsby Town	359	(8)
2000–2002	Bristol City	31	(1)
2002–2003	Mansfield Town	15	(0)
2003–2005	Ilkeston Town	29	(1)
2004	→ Ossett Albion (loan)		
Total		434	(10)

Managerial career
- 2009: Bridlington Town
- * Club domestic league appearances and goals

Mark Lever (born 29 March 1970) is an English former professional footballer and coach who played as a defender from 1988 until 2005.

Lever came through the youth ranks at Grimsby Town in 1988. He became a first team regular in the early nineties and was part of the team that won promotion via the Football League Second Division play-off final and the Football League Trophy during the 1997–98 season. Lever spent the first twelve years of his career with Grimsby and departed the club in 2000 when he joined Bristol City. Injuries prevented him from making a real impact at Ashton Gate and after two years he moved on again to Mansfield Town. In 2003, he dropped out of professional football and joined Non-league Ilkeston Town before finishing his career in 2004 whilst on loan with Ossett Albion.

In 2008, he was appointed to the coaching staff of Bridlington Town, briefly making the step up to manager in 2009.

== Career ==
=== Grimsby Town ===
Lever came through the youth ranks at Grimsby Town and was promoted to the club's first team squad by Alan Buckley at the beginning of the 1987–1988 season. He naturally soon became one of the club's regular centre backs, and found himself slotting in at the side of veteran centre half Paul Futcher. Lever received the club's "Supporters Young Player of The Season" awards in both 1989 and 1991. He went on to be an integral part of the Town side that earned two back to back promotions in 1990 and 1991. When Futcher moved on, Grimsby nurtured in Peter Handyside as his long-term replacement, and both players were part of an iconic Mariners defensive line up in the nineties that included the likes of Gary Croft, Graham Rodger, John McDermott and Tony Gallimore.

Arguably Lever's most successful season was the 1997–1998 campaign, in which Grimsby bounced back from relegation the previous season, to clinch promotion back to the First Division via a 1–0 victory over Northampton Town at Wembley Stadium in the Second Division play-off final. Also before the final victory, Grimsby, aided by Lever defeated AFC Bournemouth at Wembley in the Football League Trophy final with a 2–1 scoreline. Lever continued to play for The Mariners in the 1998–1999, and 1999–2000 campaigns, and was also used as a makeshift captain in the absence of Paul Groves on several occasions. Lever's contract expired with The Mariners in the summer of 2000, and he opted to leave Blundell Park.

In his time at Grimsby, he made over 400 appearances in all competitions, scoring a total of 8 goals, he made his final appearance against Birmingham City in the final league game of the season, a few weeks after this match, Lever received the "Supporters Player of The Season" for the 1999–2000 campaign. Lever is considered to this day to be a cult hero by Grimsby Town supporters, and is one of the most successful players in the club's history.

=== Bristol City ===
After 12 years at Grimsby, Lever dropped down a division and signed for Bristol City in July 2000 on a free transfer, and naturally became the main candidate to be the club captain. However his first season, was ruined by injury, after making his debut on the opening day of the season in a 2–0 defeat against Wrexham, Lever went on to feature in two more games, before injury ruled him out for the rest of the 2000–2001 campaign. The following season was more successful for Lever, as he completed 34 games in all competitions, coupled with a single goal in a 3–0 victory over Oldham Athletic on 2 February 2002. At the end of the 2001–2002 campaign, City decided not to renew Lever's two-year contract and he was released.

=== Mansfield Town ===
In August 2002, Lever signed for newly promoted Second Division side Mansfield Town. He made his debut for The Stags in the 2–0 derby defeat against local rivals Chesterfield on 28 August 2002. Lever would only go on to make 15 league appearances for Town in the 2002–2003 season, while also playing in the 3–0 FA Cup defeat against Crewe Alexandra on 7 December. Lever was released by the club at the end of the season, thus bringing to end his career playing in the professional leagues. The FA Cup defeat with Crewe, turned out to be his final game for the club, and in professional football.

=== Ilkeston Town ===
Lever signed a one-year deal with Northern Premier League outfit Ilkeston Town at the start of the 2003–2004 season. This would be his first taste of the Non League football circuit, and he notably formed a defensive partnership with former Nottingham Forest stalwart Steve Chettle. Lever signed a one-year contract extension for the 2004–2005 season, and during this season he had fallen out of favour within the Ilkeston playing squads, thus opening up a loan move too lowly Yorkshire amateur side Ossett Albion. He remained with Albion for two months before returning too Ilkeston. Lever was released by Town in May 2005, and subsequently retired from playing competitive football aged 35.

== Style of play ==
Lever, was described as "A big, old-fashioned centre-half that bullies strikers."

== Coaching career ==
In 2009 Lever briefly managed Bridlington Town.

== Honours ==
Grimsby Town

- Football League Third Division third-place promotion: 1990–91
- Football League Second Division play-offs: 1998
- Football League Fourth Division second-place promotion: 1989–90
- Football League Trophy: 1997–98

Individual

- Grimsby Town Supporters' Young Player of the Year: 1989, 1991
- Grimsby Town Supporters' Player of the Year: 2000
