= Clive Mendonca =

English footballer

Personal information
- Full name: Clive Paul Mendonca
- Date of birth: 9 September 1968 (age 58)
- Place of birth: Islington, London, England
- Position: Forward

Senior career*
Years	Team	Apps	(Gls)
1986–1988	Sheffield United	13	(4)
1988	→ Doncaster Rovers (loan)	2	(0)
1988–1991	Rotherham United	84	(27)
1991–1992	Sheffield United	10	(1)
1992	→ Grimsby Town (loan)	10	(3)
1992–1997	Grimsby Town	156	(57)
1997–2002	Charlton Athletic	84	(40)
Total		359	(132)
- * Club domestic league appearances and goals

Clive Paul Mendonca (born 9 September 1968) is an English former professional footballer, who played as a forward between 1986 and 2002, notably for Grimsby Town and Charlton Athletic. Mendonca also played for Sheffield United, Doncaster Rovers and Rotherham United.

== Career ==
Mendonca started his career with Sheffield United, before spells with Doncaster Rovers, Rotherham United and Sheffield United again. Mendonca then moved to Grimsby Town in 1992, initially on loan. Mendonca scored 60 goals in 166 appearances for Grimsby, and is considered to be their best striker in recent history. Mendonca moved to Charlton Athletic in the summer of 1997 and scored twenty eight times for the Addicks in the 1997–98 season, including a hat-trick against his home town team Sunderland who he'd supported as a boy, in the Division One play-off final at Wembley. His hat-trick in 1998 was the last one to be scored at the original Wembley Stadium for an English league team. Mendonca also scored a penalty in the subsequent penalty shoot-out after a 4–4 draw, which Charlton won 7–6.

Mendonca scored another hat-trick in Charlton's first home game in the Premier League, a 5–0 win against Southampton. However, he started to suffer a series of injury problems, with his final appearance for Charlton coming in the first half of the 1999–2000 season against Queens Park Rangers. Although a possible return to Grimsby was mooted, Mendonca retired from football in February 2002.

On 9 August 2003, a testimonial match was played against NEC Nijmegen which ended 1–1.

== Personal life ==
He is the nephew of former West Indian wicket-keeper Ivor Mendonca. Born in Islington, London, he moved to Sunderland at the age of two. In 2004, he won both the BBC's "Grimsby's cult heroes" and "Charlton's cult heroes" polls with 52% and 43% respectively.

In January 2012 Mendonca auctioned his prized possessions from his football career to help his wife set up her own business.

Mendonca works at the Nissan plant in Sunderland.

== Honours ==
Charlton Athletic

- Football League First Division: 1999–2000; play-offs: 1998
