= John McDermott (English footballer) =

English footballer and manager

Personal information
- Full name: John McDermott
- Date of birth: 3 February 1969 (age 57)
- Place of birth: Middlesbrough, England
- Height: 5 ft 7 in (1.70 m)
- Position: Right back

Team information
- Current team: Bradford Park Avenue (assistant manager)

Youth career
- 1985–1987: Grimsby Town

Senior career*
Years	Team	Apps	(Gls)
1987–2007	Grimsby Town	647	(10)
Total		647	(10)

Managerial career
- 2017–2018: Alfreton Town
- * Club domestic league appearances and goals

John McDermott (born 3 February 1969) is an English football coach and former professional footballer who is assistant manager at Bradford Park Avenue.

As a player, he was a right-back from 1987 to 2007, spending his entire 20-year playing career at Grimsby Town, and holds the club's all-time appearance record, having played 647 league games, 754 games overall for the Mariners. He is one of only 17 players in the history of English football to play more than 600 Football League matches for a single club.

Upon retirement McDermott moved into coaching at the Grimsby Institute before he was appointed assistant manager at Harrogate Town in 2010. He has since had spells as manager of Alfreton Town as well as coaching roles at Cleethorpes Town, Scunthorpe United, Boston United and Matlock Town.

== Playing career ==
He was released at apprentice level. However, when the apprenticeship scheme was revamped he was re-signed as a trainee at Grimsby Town and after 13 appearances in the Second Division he signed professional terms. At the start of McDermott's career he was a utility player but then established himself as a regular right-back for the Mariners.

He won Grimsby Town's 'Player of the Year' award a record three times. In 1994, McDermott suffered an injury and was injured for nine months. He regained his place in the team in 1996 and was linked with moves to Sunderland and Ipswich Town, but he did not leave Grimsby Town. A quote from him in 2005 on the situation of present-day footballers is:

"If someone would rather sit in the reserves at a big club and drive around in a Ferrari rather than going out on-loan and playing, then I think it's a sad day."

There was a time where he was expected to move to fierce rivals Hull, but the deal never materialised.

He was appointed captain by player/manager Paul Groves, and won BBC Radio Humberside 'Sports personality of the year' award. Other highlights in his career included the win over Tottenham Hotspur in the League Cup. Further highlights followed in the 2005–06 season as he had his second testimonial against local rivals Hull City and was included in Four Four Two magazine's list of the top 50 players outside the Premier League.

Throughout his 20-year career, McDermott has experienced promotion or relegation nine times. He considers his Man of The Match award in the Football League Trophy victory in 1998 to be the highlight of his career.

McDermott was described by one Grimsby Town fanzine as a defender who 'defends without tackling'; meant as a compliment to his ability to shackle opposition strikers without committing fouls.

McDermott announced on 20 December 2006 that he would retire at the end of the 2006–07 season. McDermott played his final home game for Grimsby on 29 April 2007 against local rivals Lincoln City. The game finished 0–0. McDermott made his final appearance for Grimsby away to Shrewsbury, the final league game of the season, and coincidentally Shrewsbury's final league game at Gay Meadow. McDermott was substituted in the 73rd minute as Grimsby fought out a 2–2 draw. Upon leaving the field, play paused briefly as both sets of fans applauded McDermott off the field.

McDermott's autobiography It's Not All Black & White, went on sale in August 2013. Co-written by Simon Ashberry, the book is published by The History Press. He took part in two events to mark the launch of the book - An Evening With John McDermott hosted by the Mariners Trust at Grimsby Town and a book signing sessions at Waterstones in Grimsby.

== Coaching career ==
In July 2007, McDermott applied for the vacant manager's job at Boston United but was overlooked for the position, and United in turn appointed Tommy Taylor. In October 2008, McDermott distanced himself from speculation linking him to managing Grimsby Town after the sacking of Alan Buckley. McDermott then turned to coaching the Grimsby Institute Academy male and female football teams.

In October 2009, he was once again linked with the vacant managers post at Grimsby following the sacking of Mike Newell. This time McDermott as well as Dean Windass expressed a desire to take the job. McDermott was appointed assistant manager of Harrogate Town ahead of the 2010–11 season. In 2017, McDermott became the Director of Football at Cleethorpes Town, taking them to Wembley in the FA Vase Cup Final, before being named as Alfreton Town manager in May 2017. McDermott managed Alfreton until January 2018 when he was relieved from his duties.

In May 2019, McDermott was appointed Assistant Manager of Boston United.

McDermott has also worked as an academy coach for Scunthorpe United and has worked as a coach for Grimsby College.

On 16 September 2022, McDermott was reunited with former Boston manager Craig Elliot by joining him as assistant manager at Matlock Town. On 11 December 2022, Elliott and McDermott resigned from Matlock to take up similar positions at Buxton.

== Career statistics ==
Season	Club	League			FA Cup		League Cup		FL Trophy		Play Offs		Total	
Season	Club	Division	Apps	Goals	Apps	Goals	Apps	Goals	Apps	Goals	Apps	Goals	Apps	Goals
1986–87	Grimsby Town	Division 2 (Old)	13	0	0	0	0	0	0	0	0	0	13	0
1987–88	Grimsby Town	Division 3 (Old)	28	1	3	0	1	0	1	0	0	0	33	1
1988–89	Grimsby Town	Division 4 (Old)	38	1	5	0	2	0	3	0	0	0	48	1
1989–90	Grimsby Town	Division 4 (Old)	39	0	3	0	2	0	1	0	0	0	45	0
1990–91	Grimsby Town	Division 3 (Old)	43	0	0	0	2	0	1	0	0	0	46	0
1991–92	Grimsby Town	Division 2 (Old)	39	1	0	0	5	0	2	0	0	0	46	1
1992–93	Grimsby Town	Division 1	38	2	3	0	3	0	1	0	0	0	45	2
1993–94	Grimsby Town	Division 1	26	0	1	0	3	0	2	0	0	0	32	0
1994–95	Grimsby Town	Division 1	12	0	1	0	0	0	0	0	0	0	13	0
1995–96	Grimsby Town	Division 1	28	1	4	0	0	0	0	0	0	0	32	1
1996–97	Grimsby Town	Division 1	29	1	0	0	2	0	0	0	0	0	31	1
1997–98	Grimsby Town	Division 2	41	1	6	1	5	0	7	0	3	0	62	2
1998–99	Grimsby Town	Division 1	37	0	1	1	5	0	0	0	0	0	43	1
1999–00	Grimsby Town	Division 1	26	0	2	0	2	0	0	0	0	0	30	0
2000–01	Grimsby Town	Division 1	36	0	1	0	3	0	0	0	0	0	40	0
2001–02	Grimsby Town	Division 1	24	0	0	0	2	0	0	0	0	0	26	0
2002–03	Grimsby Town	Division 1	35	0	1	0	1	0	0	0	0	0	37	0
2003–04	Grimsby Town	Division 2	21	0	2	0	0	0	0	0	0	0	23	0
2004–05	Grimsby Town	League Two	39	2	1	0	2	0	0	0	0	0	42	2
2005–06	Grimsby Town	League Two	32	1	1	0	3	0	0	0	1	0	37	1
2006–07	Grimsby Town	League Two	23	0	2	0	0	0	2	0	0	0	27	0
Grimsby Total			647	11	37	2	43	0	20	0	4	0	751	13

== Honours ==
Grimsby Town

- Football League Third Division third-place promotion: 1990–91
- Football League Second Division play-offs: 1998
- Football League Fourth Division second-place promotion: 1989–90
- Football League Trophy: 1997–98

Individual

- Grimsby Town Supporters' Young Player of the Year: 1987, 1990, 1992
- Grimsby Town Supporters' Player of the Year: 2005
- Grimsby Town Special Achievement Award: 2007
