= 1997–98 Grimsby Town F.C. season =

Grimsby Town
1997–98 season
- Chairman: Peter Furneaux
- Manager: Alan Buckley
- Stadium: Blundell Park
- Second Division: 3rd (promoted via playoffs)
- FA Cup: Fourth round
- League Cup: Fourth round
- Auto Windscreens Shield: Winners
- Top goalscorer: League: Donovan (16); All: Donovan (21)
- Average home league attendance: 5,601
Home colours	Away colours

During the 1997–98 English football season, Grimsby Town F.C. competed in the Football League Second Division.

== Season summary ==
The 1997–98 season saw the return of Alan Buckley as manager, after an unsuccessful period at West Bromwich Albion, for Grimsby's most successful post-war season. In the summer of 1997, Buckley succeeded in bringing in players to the club who were to be instrumental in the club's upcoming season. Former skipper Paul Groves was re-signed from West Bromwich Albion, and Kevin Donovan and David Smith also joined the club from Albion. The mid-season capture of Huddersfield Town midfielder Wayne Burnett proved to be a great bit of business for Buckley. After a seemingly poor start to the League campaign, performances improved, which propelled the club into a promotion battle with Watford, Bristol City and an expensively assembled Fulham (at the time the only club at this level to have spent seven-figure sums on players). A good run in the League Cup saw The Mariners knock holders Leicester City and fellow Premier League side Sheffield Wednesday out of the competition before finally losing out to Liverpool. A decent run of form had ignited the careers of such younger players as Daryl Clare, Danny Butterfield and Jack Lester who were becoming an integral part of the Blundell Park set-up. The Mariners went on to dump Burnley out of the Football League Trophy Northern section area final, which would see the club book its first trip to Wembley Stadium. The club were drawn against Southern section champions AFC Bournemouth and in a tight game, an equaliser from substitute Kingsley Black took the game into extra time, and in the 112th minute Grimsby secured the game courtesy of a golden goal from Wayne Burnett. This was the first major trophy awarded to the club following its first appearance at Wembley. It took only four weeks for Grimsby to return to the stadium though, this time to face Northampton Town in the Division Two Play Off Final. Town won the game 1–0 thanks to a first half Kevin Donovan goal which gave the club a historic Wembley double and The Mariners promotion back to Division One.

== Transfers ==
=== Transfers in ===
Date	Pos	Player	Transferred from	Fee	Ref
1 August 1997	MF	(England) Kevin Donovan	(England) West Bromwich Albion	£300,000	
1 August 1997	MF	(England) Paul Groves	(England) West Bromwich Albion	£250,000	
1 August 1997	FW	(Wales) Lee Nogan	(England) Reading	£170,000	
1 August 1997	GK	(Northern Ireland) Aidan Davison	(England) Bradford City	Free Transfer	
16 January 1998	MF	(England) David Smith	(England) West Bromwich Albion	£200,000	
12 February 1998	MF	(England) Wayne Burnett	(England) Huddersfield Town	£100,000	
26 March 1998	MF	(Scotland) Jim Dobbin	(England) Scarborough	Free transfer	

=== Loans in ===
Date	Pos	Player	Transferred from	Date Until	Ref
10 August 1997	MF	(England) Dave Gilbert	(England) West Bromwich Albion	13 September 1997	
1 August 1997	MF	(England) Paul Holsgrove	(England) Reading	9 November 1997	
9 January 1998	MF	(England) Wayne Burnett	(England) Huddersfield Town	8 February 1998	

=== Transfers out ===
Date	Pos	Player	Transferred To	Fee	Ref
31 May 1997	FW	(England) Clive Mendonca	(England) Charlton Athletic	£700,000	
31 May 1997	MF	(England) Craig Shakespeare	(England) Scunthorpe United	Released	
31 May 1997	DF	(England) Joby Gowshall	(England) Lincoln City	Released	
31 May 1997	DF	(England) Neil Webb	(England) Aldershot Town	Released	
31 May 1997	GK	(England) Andy Quy	(England) Stevenage Borough	Released	
31 May 1997	MF	(England) Paul Harsley	(England) Scunthorpe United	Released	
1 August 1997	MF	(Wales) John Oster	(England) Everton	£1,500,000	
7 August 1997	MF	(England) Jimmy Neil	(England) Scunthorpe United	Released	
1 September 1997	MF	(England) Gary Childs	(England) Wisbech Town	Released	
6 December 1997	MF	(England) Nicky Southall	(England) Gillingham	Free transfer	

=== Loans out ===
Date	Pos	Player	Transferred To	Date Until	Ref
7 November 1997	FW	(England) Neil Woods	(England) Wigan Athletic	9 November 1997	
17 January 1998	FW	(England) Neil Woods	(England) Scunthorpe United	16 February 1998	
17 February 1998	FW	(England) Neil Woods	(England) Mansfield Town	17 March 1998	
26 March 1998	DF	(England) Ashley Fickling	(England) Darlington	31 May 1998	

Transfers in: ▼£1,020,000
Transfers out: ▲£2,200,000
Total spending: ▲£480,000

== Final league table ==
Pos	Team	Pld	W	D	L	GF	GA	GD	Pts	Promotion or relegation
1	Watford (C, P)	46	24	16	6	67	41	+26	88	Promotion to the First Division
2	Bristol City (P)	46	25	10	11	69	39	+30	85	Promotion to the First Division
3	Grimsby Town (O, P)	46	19	15	12	55	37	+18	72	Qualification for the Second Division play-offs
4	Northampton Town	46	18	17	11	52	37	+15	71	Qualification for the Second Division play-offs
5	Bristol Rovers	46	20	10	16	70	64	+6	70	Qualification for the Second Division play-offs

Rules for classification: In the Football League goals scored (GF) takes precedence over goal difference (GD).
(C) Champions; (O) Play-off winners; (P) Promoted

== Results ==
Grimsby Town's score comes first

=== Legend ===
Win	Draw	Loss

=== Football League Second Division ===
Date	Opponent	Venue	Result	Attendance	Scorers
9 August 1997	Bristol City	H	1–1	6,220	Widdrington
16 August 1997	Plymouth Argyle	A	2–2	6,002	Donovan (pen), Nogan
23 August 1997	Wrexham	H	0–0	4,404	
30 August 1997	Brentford	A	1–3	3,875	Nogan
2 September 1997	Preston North End	A	0–2	9,489	
9 September 1997	York City	H	0–0	5,308	
13 September 1997	Fulham	A	2–0	6,874	Livingstone (2)
20 September 1997	Millwall	H	0–1	4,267	
27 September 1997	Bournemouth	A	1–0	3,712	Groves
4 October 1997	Wigan Athletic	H	2–1	4,623	Donovan (2 pens)
11 October 1997	Northampton Town	H	1–0	4,778	Donovan
18 October 1997	Blackpool	A	2–2	5,234	Nogan, Donovan (pen)
21 October 1997	Oldham Athletic	A	0–2	4,520	
25 October 1997	Watford	H	0–1	5,699	
1 November 1997	Southend United	H	5–1	4,501	Nogan (2), Lester, Groves, Widdrington
4 November 1997	Walsall	A	0–0	2,599	
8 November 1997	Chesterfield	A	0–1	5,004	
22 November 1997	Burnley	H	4–1	4,829	Groves, Widdrington, Lester, Nogan
29 November 1997	Gillingham	A	2–0	4,855	Jobling, Black
2 December 1997	Wycombe Wanderers	H	0–0	4,160	
12 December 1997	Bristol Rovers	A	4–0	4,801	Gallimore, Livingstone (2), Donovan
20 December 1997	Carlisle United	H	1–0	6,222	McDermott
26 December 1997	York City	A	0–0	7,093	
28 December 1997	Preston North End	H	3–1	6,725	Donovan (2), Black
10 January 1998	Bristol City	A	1–4	12,567	Groves
17 January 1998	Brentford	H	4–0	4,624	Groves, Smith, Donovan, Clare
31 January 1998	Fulham	H	1–1	6,785	Burnett
7 February 1998	Millwall	A	1–0	6,020	Livingstone
14 February 1998	Wigan Athletic	A	2–0	3,548	Nogan, Donovan
21 February 1998	Bournemouth	H	2–1	5,456	O'Neil (own goal), Groves
24 February 1998	Blackpool	H	1–0	4,924	Clare
28 February 1998	Northampton Town	A	1–2	6,932	Donovan
3 March 1998	Chesterfield	H	0–0	4,940	
7 March 1998	Southend United	A	1–0	4,829	Clare
14 March 1998	Walsall	H	3–0	4,916	Nogan, Donovan (2)
21 March 1998	Luton Town	A	2–2	5,700	Gallimore, Donovan
24 March 1998	Plymouth Argyle	H	1–0	4,661	Groves
28 March 1998	Burnley	A	1–2	8,256	Lester
31 March 1998	Wrexham	A	0–0	5,421	
4 April 1998	Gillingham	H	0–0	5,190	
7 April 1998	Luton Town	H	0–1	4,455	
10 April 1998	Wycombe Wanderers	A	1–1	5,846	Lester
13 April 1998	Bristol Rovers	H	1–2	5,484	Donovan (pen)
21 April 1998	Carlisle United	A	1–0	3,956	Donovan (pen)
25 April 1998	Watford	A	0–0	14,002	
2 May 1998	Oldham Athletic	H	0–2	8,054	

=== Second Division play-offs ===
Round	Date	Opponent	Venue	Result	Attendance	Goalscorers
Semi-final first leg	9 May 1998	Fulham	A	1–1	13,954	Smith
Semi-final second leg	13 May 1998	Fulham	H	1–0 (won 2–1 on agg)	8,689	Donovan
Final	24 May 1998	Northampton Town	N	1–0	62,988	Donovan

=== FA Cup ===
Round	Date	Opponent	Venue	Result	Attendance	Goalscorers
First round	15 November 1997	Shrewsbury Town	A	1–1	3,193	Southall
First round replay	25 November 1997	Shrewsbury Town	H	4–0	3,242	Nogan, Herbert (own goal), Lester, Jobling
Second round	6 December 1997	Chesterfield	H	2–2	4,762	Rodger, Nogan
Second round replay	16 December 1997	Chesterfield	A	2–0	4,553	Lester, Groves
Third round	3 January 1998	Norwich City	H	3–0	8,161	McDermott, Woods, Donovan
Fourth round	14 January 1998	Leeds United	A	0–2	29,598	

=== League Cup ===
Round	Date	Opponent	Venue	Result	Attendance	Goalscorers
First round first leg	12 August 1997	Oldham Athletic	A	0–1	5,656	
First round second leg	26 August 1997	Oldham Athletic	H	5–0 (won 5–1 on agg)	5,078	Lester (3), Livingstone, Donovan
Second round first leg	17 September 1997	Sheffield Wednesday	H	2–0	6,429	Groves, Livingstone
Second round second leg	1 October 1997	Sheffield Wednesday	A	2–3 (won 4–3 on agg)	11,120	Nogan, Groves
Third round	14 October 1997	Leicester City	H	3–1	7,738	Jobling, Livingstone (2)
Fourth round	18 November 1997	Liverpool	A	0–3	28,515	

=== Football League Trophy ===
Round	Date	Opponent	Venue	Result	Attendance	Goalscorers
First round	9 December 1997	Chesterfield	A	1–0	1,128	Nogan
Second round	6 January 1998	Hull City	H	1–0	4,778	Butterfield
Area quarter-final	27 January 1998	Scunthorpe United	A	2–0	4,596	Groves, Burnett
Area semi-final	17 February 1998	Blackpool	H	1–0	8,027	Burnett
Area final first leg	10 March 1998	Burnley	H	1–1	6,064	Groves
Area final second leg	17 March 1998	Burnley	A	2–0 (won 3–1 on agg)	10,257	Nogan, Donovan
Final	19 April 1998	Bournemouth	N	2–1	62,432	Glass (own goal), Burnett

== Squad ==
No.	Pos	Nat	Player	Total		Second Division		Play-offs		FA Cup		FL Cup		FL Trophy	
No.	Pos	Nat	Player	Apps	Goals	Apps	Goals	Apps	Goals	Apps	Goals	Apps	Goals	Apps	Goals
-	GK	(Northern Ireland) NIR	Aidan Davison	63	0	42+0	0	3+0	0	6+0	0	5+0	0	7+0	0
-	GK	(England) ENG	Jason Pearcey	5	0	4+0	0	0+0	0	0+0	0	1+0	0	0+0	0
-	DF	(Scotland) SCO	Peter Handyside	64	0	40+2	0	1+0	0	6+0	0	6+0	0	8+1	0
-	DF	(England) ENG	John McDermott	62	2	40+1	1	3+0	0	6+0	1	5+0	0	7+0	0
-	DF	(England) ENG	Mark Lever	54	0	37+1	0	3+0	0	1+1	0	5+0	0	6+0	0
-	DF	(England) ENG	Tony Gallimore	56	2	34+1	2	3+0	0	6+0	0	5+0	0	7+0	0
-	DF	(England) ENG	Kevin Jobling	44	3	17+13	1	0+1	0	5+0	1	1+3	1	2+2	0
-	DF	(England) ENG	Graham Rodger	19	1	10+1	0	0+0	0	5+0	1	1+1	0	1+0	0
-	DF	(England) ENG	Danny Butterfield	11	1	4+3	0	0+0	0	0+1	0	1+0	0	1+1	1
-	DF	(England) ENG	Matthew Bloomer	1	0	0+0	0	0+0	0	0+0	0	0+0	0	0+1	0
-	DF	(England) ENG	Ben Chapman	1	0	0+0	0	0+0	0	0+0	0	0+0	0	0+1	0
-	DF	(England) ENG	Ashley Fickling	0	0	0+0	0	0+0	0	0+0	0	0+0	0	0+0	0
-	MF	(England) ENG	Paul Groves	68	12	46+0	7	3+0	0	6+0	1	6+0	2	7+0	2
-	MF	(England) ENG	Kevin Donovan	67	21	46+0	16	3+0	2	6+0	1	6+0	1	6+0	1
-	MF	(Northern Ireland) NIR	Kingsley Black	55	2	24+15	2	0+3	0	4+0	0	5+0	0	2+2	0
-	MF	(England) ENG	Wayne Burnett	29	4	20+1	1	3+0	0	0+0	0	0+0	0	5+0	3
-	MF	(England) ENG	David Smith	25	2	17+0	1	3+0	1	1+0	0	0+0	0	4+0	0
-	MF	(England) ENG	Tommy Widdrington	30	3	15+6	3	0+0	0	2+0	0	5+1	0	1+0	0
-	MF	(England) ENG	Dave Gilbert	6	0	5+0	0	0+0	0	0+0	0	1+0	0	0+0	0
-	MF	(England) ENG	Nicky Southall	9	1	4+1	0	0+0	0	1+1	1	1+1	0	0+0	0
-	MF	(England) ENG	Paul Holsgrove	10	0	3+7	0	0+0	0	0+0	0	0+0	0	0+0	0
-	MF	(Scotland) SCO	Jim Dobbin	2	0	1+1	0	0+0	0	0+0	0	0+0	0	0+0	0
-	MF	(England) ENG	Darren Wrack	2	0	0+1	0	0+0	0	0+0	0	0+0	0	0+1	0
-	MF	(England) ENG	Gary Childs	0	0	0+0	0	0+0	0	0+0	0	0+0	0	0+0	0
-	FW	(Wales) WAL	Lee Nogan	54	13	33+3	8	3+0	0	4+0	2	6+0	1	5+0	2
-	FW	(England) ENG	Steve Livingstone	59	9	28+13	5	0+2	0	2+3	0	3+3	4	4+1	0
-	FW	(England) ENG	Jack Lester	57	9	27+13	4	3+0	0	4+0	2	3+2	3	1+4	0
-	FW	(Ireland) EIR	Daryl Clare	33	3	8+14	3	0+1	0	1+4	0	0+0	0	4+1	0
-	FW	(England) ENG	Neil Woods	14	1	1+9	0	0+0	0	0+1	1	0+2	0	1+0	0
