= 1998 Football League Trophy final =

1998 Football League Trophy Final
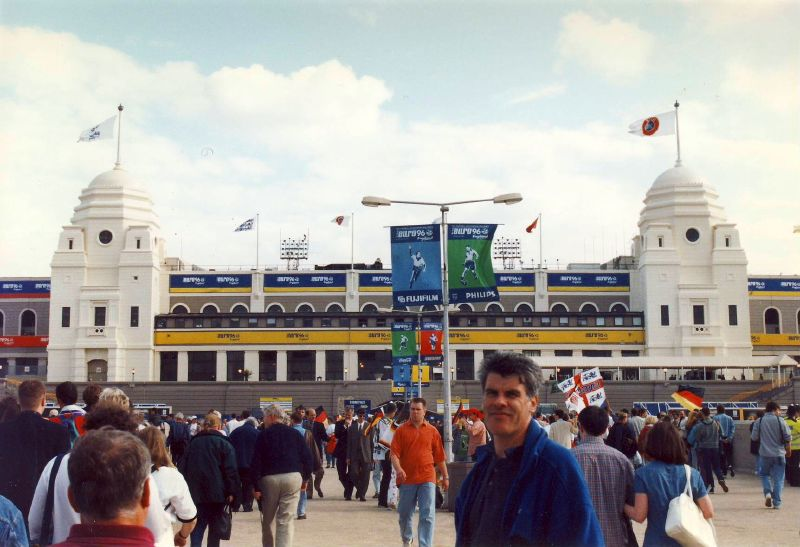
- Wembley Stadium, which hosted the match.
- Event: 1997–98 Football League Trophy
| Bournemouth | Grimsby Town |
| 1 | 2 |
- Date: 19 April 1998
- Venue: Wembley, London
- Man of the Match: John McDermott (Grimsby Town)
- Referee: M.E.Pierce (Portsmouth)
- Attendance: 62,432

The 1998 Football League Trophy Final (known as the Auto Windscreens Shields Trophy for sponsorship reasons) was the 15th final of the domestic football cup competition for teams from the Second and Third Division of the Football League. The match was played at Wembley on 19 April 1998, and was contested by Bournemouth and Grimsby Town. The match was won by Grimsby Town, with Wayne Burnett scoring the winning golden goal in the 2–1 victory during extra-time. The attendance was the largest for a sporting event in England that weekend.

Grimsby's victory was the first of a Wembley double that season as later they went on to triumph in the 1998 Football League Second Division play-off final.

== Background ==
Bournemouth and Grimsby entered the fixture in a similar positions with both clubs fighting for promotion from the Football League Second Division. Grimsby were 3rd trailing Watford and Bristol City where Bournemouth were outside the play-offs in 8th. Bournemouth were competing in their second Football League Trophy final having won the first ever tournament in 1984, Grimsby were competing in their first final. Both teams were playing at Wembley for the first time.

== Match details ==
19 April 1998

| Bournemouth | 1–2 (a.e.t.) | Grimsby Town |
|---|---|---|
| Bailey 31' | (Report) | Glass 75' (o.g.); Burnett 112' |

Wembley, London
Attendance: 62,432
Referee: M.E.Pierce

| Bournemouth | Grimsby Town |

| GK | 1 | Jimmy Glass |
| RB | 2 | Neil Young |
| LB | 3 | Jamie Vincent |
| CB | 4 | Eddie Howe | Booked |
| CB | 5 | Ian Cox |
| RM | 6 | John Bailey | Booked |
| CM | 7 | Russell Beardsmore | (substituted off) 105' |
| CM | 8 | Steve Robinson |
| LM | 11 | Christer Warren | (substituted off) 90' |
| CF | 9 | Mark Stein |
| CF | 10 | Steve Fletcher |
Substitutes:
| MF | 12 | Jason Brissett | (substituted on) 90' |
| MF | 13 | John O'Neill | (substituted on) 105' |
| DF | 14 | Franck Rolling |
Manager:
Mel Machin

| GK | 1 | Aidan Davison |
| RB | 2 | John McDermott | Booked |
| LB | 3 | Tony Gallimore | (substituted off) 55' |
| CB | 4 | Peter Handyside |
| CB | 5 | Mark Lever |
| RM | 7 | Kevin Donovan |
| CM | 6 | Wayne Burnett | Booked |
| CM | 11 | Paul Groves (c) |
| LM | 8 | David Smith | Booked |
| CF | 9 | Lee Nogan | (substituted off) 93' |
| CF | 10 | Daryl Clare | (substituted off) 55' |
Substitute:
| FW | 12 | Steve Livingstone | (yellow card) (substituted on) 55' |
| MF | 13 | Kingsley Black | (substituted on) 55' |
| MF | 14 | Kevin Jobling | (substituted on) 93' |
Manager:
Alan Buckley

MATCH RULES

- 90 minutes.
- 30 minutes of extra-time if necessary.
- Penalty shoot-out if scores still level.
- Maximum of 3 substitutions.

== Route to the final ==
=== Bournemouth ===
| Round 1 (South) | received bye | | |
| Round 2 (South) | Bournemouth | 2–0 | Leyton Orient |
| Quarter-finals (South) | Bournemouth | 1–0 | Bristol City |
| Semi-finals (South) | Bournemouth | 1–0 | Luton Town |
| Final (South, 1st leg) | Walsall | 0–2 | Bournemouth |
| Final (South, 2nd leg) | Bournemouth | 2–3 | Walsall |
| | (Bournemouth won 4–3 on aggregate) | | |

=== Grimsby Town ===
| Round 1 (North) | Chesterfield | 0–1 | Grimsby Town |
| Round 2 (North) | Grimsby Town | 1–0 | Hull City |
| Quarter-finals (North) | Scunthorpe United | 0–2 | Grimsby Town |
| Semi-finals (North) | Grimsby Town | 1–0 | Blackpool |
| Final (North, 1st leg) | Grimsby Town | 1–1 | Burnley |
| Final (North, 2nd leg) | Burnley | 0–2 | Grimsby Town |
| | (Grimsby Town won 3–1 on aggregate) | | |
