= 1998 Football League Second Division play-off final =

Association football match

- The final took place at Wembley Stadium.
Grimsby Town	Northampton Town
1	0
- Date: 24 May 1998
- Venue: Wembley Stadium, London
- Referee: Terry Heilbron
- Attendance: 62,988

The 1998 Football League Second Division play-off final was an association football match which was played on 24 May 1998 at Wembley Stadium, London, between Grimsby Town and Northampton Town. The top two teams of the 1997–98 Football League Second Division league, Watford and Bristol City, gained automatic promotion to the First Division, while those placed from third to sixth place in the table took part in play-offs. The winners of the play-off semi-finals competed for the final place for the 1998–99 season in the First Division. The losing semi-finalists were Bristol Rovers and Fulham who had been defeated by Northampton and Grimsby respectively.

The match was refereed by Terry Heilbron in front of a crowd of 62,988 spectators (44,250 of which were Northampton, a modern-day record at the time). After twenty minutes, Grimsby took the lead through Kevin Donovan who dribbled round the Northampton goalkeeper Andy Woodman, and struck the ball into the goal. In the second half, Jack Lester was fouled in the Northampton penalty area to win a penalty kick. Donovan's spot kick was saved by Woodman to keep the game at 1–0, which remained the score at the final whistle, to see Grimsby promoted to the First Division after a single season's absence.

Grimsby's next season finished with them in eleventh position in the First Division. Northampton ended their following season in 22nd place in the Second Division and were relegated to the Third Division for the 1999–2000 season.

== Route to the final ==
Football League Second Division final table, leading positions
Pos	Team	Pld	W	D	L	GF	GA	GD	Pts
1	Watford	46	24	16	6	67	41	+26	88
2	Bristol City	46	25	10	11	69	39	+30	85
3	Grimsby Town	46	19	15	12	55	37	+18	72
4	Northampton Town	46	18	17	11	52	37	+15	71
5	Bristol Rovers	46	20	10	16	70	64	+6	70
6	Fulham	46	20	10	16	60	43	+17	70

Grimsby Town finished the regular 1997–98 season in third position in the Second Division, the third tier of the English football league system, one place and one point ahead of Northampton Town. Both therefore missed out on the two automatic places for promotion to the First Division and instead took part in the play-offs to determine the third promoted team. Grimsby finished thirteen points behind Bristol City (who were promoted in second place) and sixteen behind league winners Watford.

Northampton's opponents for their play-off semi-final were Bristol Rovers and the first match of the two-legged tie took place at the Memorial Ground in Bristol on 10 May 1998. Half an hour in, Peter Beadle scored with a penalty kick after being fouled by Ian Sampson, to give the home side the lead. Frankie Bennett then headed in a corner from Gary Penrice to double Bristol Rovers' lead seven minutes later. Barry Hayles then made it 3–0 after dribbling past two defenders before scoring from inside the Northampton penalty area. John Gayle scored for the visitors in the 74th minute and the match ended 3–1 to Bristol Rovers. The second leg was held three days later at Sixfields in Northampton. Carl Heggs put the home side ahead in the 34th minute after heading in Chris Freestone's pass back from John Frain's corner. Ian Clarkson then scored from a Heggs pass in the 61st minute to level the tie on aggregate. Bristol Rovers then pressed to regain the lead but Ray Warburton headed in James Hunt's corner to give Northampton a 3–0 lead in the match and a 4–3 aggregate victory to progress to the final.

Grimsby faced Fulham in their semi-final with the first leg being held at Craven Cottage in London on 9 May 1998. Fulham dominated the first half, but five minutes before half-time, they were reduced to ten men when Paul Moody was shown a straight red card for a foul on Mark Lever. While Grimsby were making a substitution to replace the injured Lever, Paul Peschisolido was fouled in the penalty area and Peter Beardsley converted the subsequent penalty to make it 1–0 to Fulham. A mistake eight minutes into the second half from Wayne Collins allowed David Smith to equalise for Grimsby. No further goals were scored and the match ended 1–1. The second leg took place at Blundell Park near Grimsby four days later. After thirty minutes, Fulham were once again down to ten players after Peschisolido was sent off for a foul on Peter Handyside. The first half ended goalless, but with less than ten minutes of the game remaining, Kevin Donovan scored past Maik Taylor to give Grimsby a 1–0 victory and a 2–1 aggregate win.

== Match ==
=== Background ===
This was Northampton Town's second appearance in a play-off final, having been promoted the previous season with a 1–0 victory against Swansea City in the fourth tier final. They had last played in the second tier of English football in the 1966–67 season. Grimsby Town had never featured in the play-offs and were aiming to return to the second tier after a single campaign in the third having been relegated in the 1996–97 season. They had also already played at Wembley Stadium, their first appearance ever at the national stadium, earlier in the season: they had defeated Bournemouth 2–1 with a golden goal in extra time of the final of the Football League Trophy.

In the matches between the sides during the regular season, both teams won their home games, with Grimsby winning 1–0 at Blundell Park in October 1997 and Northampton securing a 2–1 victory the following February at Sixfields. The top scorer for Grimsby during the regular season was Donovan with 19 goals (16 in the league, 1 in the FA Cup, 1 in the League Cup and 1 in the Football League Trophy) followed by Lee Nogan with 13 (8 in the league, 2 in the FA Cup, 1 in the League Cup and 2 in the Football League Trophy). David Seal led the scoring for Northampton with 14 goals during the season (12 in the league, 1 in the FA Cup and 1 in the League Cup) followed by Chris Freestone with 13 (11 in the league and 2 in the Football League Trophy).

The referee for the match, which was broadcast live in the United Kingdom on Sky Sports, was Terry Heilbron. According to the BBC, Grimsby were favourites to gain promotion. Grimsby played in a 4–4–2 formation while Northampton adopted 3–5–2. Roy Hunter and Sean Parrish were long-term injuries for Northampton but otherwise, their manager Ian Atkins had a full-strength squad.

=== Summary ===
The match kicked off around 3 p.m. on 24 May 1998 at Wembley Stadium in front of a crowd of 62,988. After twenty minutes, Grimsby took the lead through Donovan: he received a pass from Wayne Burnett, dribbled round the Northampton goalkeeper Andy Woodman, and struck the ball into the goal. Three minutes later, Jack Lester's shot went wide of the Northampton goal. Freestone's missed chance was Northampton's best opportunity to score of the half. According to Trevor Haylett, writing in The Guardian, Donovan's goal was "the only highlight of a dreadfully dull first half." Northampton started the second half the stronger of the teams missing two chances in as many minutes. Soon after the hour mark, Donovan misjudged a backpass and Freestone took possession of the ball before rounding Aidan Davison, the Grimsby goalkeeper, but missed from a tight angle. In the 78th minute, Lester was fouled in the Northampton penalty area to win a penalty. Donovan's spot kick was saved by Woodman to keep the game at 1–0. Five minute later, Paul Groves hit the Northampton crossbar but with no change the score, the match ended 1–0 and Grimsby were promoted to the First Division after a single season's absence.

=== Details ===
24 May 1998
15:00

Grimsby Town	1–0	Northampton Town
Donovan 20'	Report

Wembley Stadium, London
Attendance: 62,988
Referee: Terry Heilbron

GK	Aidan Davison
DF	John McDermott
DF	Tony Gallimore (yellow card)
DF	Mark Lever
DF	Peter Handyside
MF	Wayne Burnett
MF	Paul Groves
MF	Kevin Donovan
MF	David Smith	(substituted off) 66'
FW	Jack Lester
FW	Lee Nogan	(substituted off) 60'
Substitutes:
MF	Kevin Jobling
MF	Kingsley Black	(substituted in) 66'
FW	Steve Livingstone	(substituted in) 60'
Manager:
Alan Buckley

GK	Andy Woodman
DF	Ian Clarkson
DF	John Frain (yellow card)
DF	Colin Hill	(substituted off) 60'
DF	Ian Sampson
DF	Ray Warburton
MF	Dean Peer
MF	James Hunt
FW	John Gayle	(substituted off) 56'
FW	Chris Freestone
FW	Carl Heggs
Substitutes:
MF	Jason Dozzell
MF	Ali Gibb	(substituted in) 60'
FW	David Seal	(substituted in) 56'
Manager:
Ian Atkins

== Post-match ==
Despite the victory, Alan Buckley, the Grimsby manager, was not an aficionado of the post-season decider, saying "Anybody who says they enjoy play-offs aren't football managers." The Northampton manager Atkins said he believed that some of the match's pivotal decisions had not favoured his side: "If you get a decision against you in these games it can kill you."

Grimsby's next season finished with them in eleventh position in the First Division. Northampton ended their following season in 22nd place in the Second Division and were relegated to the Third Division for the 1999–2000 season.
