= 1998–99 Grimsby Town F.C. season =

Grimsby Town
1998–99 season
- Chairman: Bill Carr
- Manager: Alan Buckley
- Stadium: Blundell Park
- Football League First Division: 11th
- FA Cup: Third round
- Worthington Cup: Third round
- Top goalscorer: League: Groves (14); All: Groves (15)
- Average home league attendance: 6,681

During the 1998–99 English football season, Grimsby Town F.C. competed in the Football League First Division.

== Season summary ==
Grimsby had a great first season back in the First Division after relegation two seasons ago, finishing in a satisfying 11th place, with club captain Groves being their top scorer with 15 in all competitions.

== Transfers ==
=== Transfers in ===
Date	Pos	Player	Transferred from	Fee	Ref
1 July 1998	MF	(England) Stacy Coldicott	(England) West Bromwich Albion	£125,000	
11 August 1998	MF	(England) Lee Ashcroft	(England) Preston North End	£500,000	

=== Transfers out ===
Date	Pos	Player	Transferred To	Fee	Ref
31 May 1998	GK	(England) Jason Pearcey	(England) Brentford	Released	
31 May 1998	DF	(England) Kevin Jobling	(England) Shrewsbury Town	Released	
31 May 1998	DF	(England) Ashley Fickling	(England) Scunthorpe United	Released	
31 May 1998	DF	(England) Graham Rodger	Retired	Released	
31 May 1998	FW	(England) Neil Woods	(England) York City	Released	
31 May 1998	MF	(England) Darren Wrack	(England) Walsall	Released	

=== Loans out ===
Date	Pos	Player	Transferred To	Date Until	Ref
21 December 1998	MF	(Scotland) Jim Dobbin	(England) Southport	9 January 1999	

== Final league table ==
Pos	Team	Pld	W	D	L	GF	GA	GD	Pts
9	Norwich City	46	15	17	14	62	61	+1	62
10	Huddersfield Town	46	15	16	15	62	71	−9	61
11	Grimsby Town	46	17	10	19	40	52	−12	61
12	West Bromwich Albion	46	16	11	19	69	76	−7	59
13	Barnsley	46	14	17	15	59	56	+3	59

Rules for classification: 1) Points; 2) Goals scored; 3) Goal difference

== Squad ==
Note: Flags indicate national team as defined under FIFA eligibility rules; some limited exceptions apply. Players may hold more than one non-FIFA nationality.

No.	Pos.	Nation	Player
-	GK	(Northern Ireland) NIR	Aidan Davison
-	DF	(England) ENG	John McDermott
-	DF	(Scotland) SCO	Peter Handyside
-	DF	(England) ENG	Richard Smith
-	DF	(England) ENG	Tony Gallimore
-	MF	(England) ENG	Paul Groves (captain)
-	MF	(Northern Ireland) NIR	Kingsley Black
-	FW	(Wales) WAL	Lee Nogan
-	FW	(England) ENG	Jack Lester
-	MF	(England) ENG	Stacy Coldicott
-	DF	(England) ENG	David Smith
-	MF	(England) ENG	Kevin Donovan
-	FW	(England) ENG	Lee Ashcroft

No.	Pos.	Nation	Player
-	MF	(England) ENG	Tommy Widdrington
-	GK	(England) ENG	Andy Love
-	FW	(England) ENG	Steve Livingstone
-	DF	(England) ENG	Mark Lever
-	MF	(England) ENG	Wayne Burnett
-	DF	(England) ENG	Danny Butterfield
-	FW	(Republic of Ireland) IRL	Daryl Clare
-	GK	(England) ENG	Steve Croudson
-	MF	(Scotland) SCO	Jim Dobbin
-	DF	(England) ENG	Matthew Bloomer
-	MF	(England) ENG	Adam Buckley
-	DF	(England) ENG	Ben Chapman
