= Tommy Widdrington =

English footballer (born 1971)

Personal information
- Full name: Thomas Widdrington
- Date of birth: 1 October 1971 (age 55)
- Place of birth: Newcastle upon Tyne, England
- Height: 5 ft 10 in (1.78 m)
- Position: Midfielder

Youth career
- Wallsend Boys Club
- 1987–1990: Southampton

Senior career*
Years	Team	Apps	(Gls)
1990–1996	Southampton	75	(3)
1991	→ Wigan Athletic (loan)	6	(0)
1996–1999	Grimsby Town	89	(8)
1999	→ Port Vale (loan)	9	(1)
1999–2001	Port Vale	73	(7)
2001–2003	Hartlepool United	56	(5)
2003–2005	Macclesfield Town	58	(0)
2005	Port Vale	6	(0)
2005–2010	Salisbury City	46	(2)
Total		418	(26)

Managerial career
- 2009–2010: Salisbury City
- 2011–2012: Hemel Hempstead Town
- 2012–2017: Eastbourne Borough
- 2020: Bristol Rovers (caretaker)
- 2021: Bristol Rovers (caretaker)
- 2021–2023: King's Lynn Town
- 2023–2025: Aldershot Town
- 2025–2026: Eastbourne Borough
Relatives	Kai Widdrington (son); Theo Widdrington (son)
- * Club domestic league appearances and goals

Thomas Widdrington (born 1 October 1971) is an English former football player and manager who was most recently manager of Isthmian League Premier Division club Eastbourne Borough.

As a midfielder, Widdrington made 372 appearances in the English Football League in a 15-year career before spending five years in non-League football. His career began at Southampton in 1990, where he spent the first six years of his career, most of which were in the Premier League. In 1996, he moved to Grimsby Town, helping the "Mariners" to the Football League Trophy and promotion out of the Second Division in 1998. The next year, he moved on to Port Vale for two years. Voted the club's Player of the Year in 2000, he captained the "Valiants" to the League Trophy in 2001. Later in the year, he was transferred to Hartlepool United, helping the club to win promotion out of League Two in 2002–03 before he moved on to Macclesfield Town. In 2005, his career in the Football League ended in Port Vale. He then spent 2005 to 2010 at non-League Salisbury City. He enjoyed promotion four times with three clubs and lifted the Football League Trophy twice as a player.

Player-manager at Salisbury City for the 2009–10 season, he returned to the Football League at Southend United as assistant manager but left the position in December 2010. He was appointed Hemel Hempstead Town manager in October 2011 before he was put in charge at Eastbourne Borough in February 2012. He left Eastbourne Borough in April 2017 and went on to work as head of recruitment at Coventry City and Bristol Rovers before becoming caretaker manager of the latter in November 2020. He returned to full-time management at King's Lynn Town in December 2021 and took charge of Aldershot Town in April 2023. He led the club to the FA Trophy title in 2025. He left Aldershot in October and returned to take charge at Eastbourne Borough. He left Eastbourne Borough in February 2026.

== Playing career ==
=== Southampton ===
Born in Newcastle upon Tyne, Widdrington started his career as a Southampton schoolboy trainee at the age of 15, having been scouted by the man who brought Alan Shearer to the club, Jack Hixon. Manager Lawrie McMenemy had a Centre of Excellence at Gateshead Stadium, despite the long distance between Southampton and North East England. He signed a professional contract with the First Division club in May 1990. He enjoyed a short loan spell at Third Division club Wigan Athletic at the start of the 1991–92 season. Ian Branfoot handed him his "Saints" debut at Everton on 1 March 1992, though it was under his successor, Alan Ball, that Widdrington enjoyed regular football.

A tough, no-nonsense midfield player, he survived some frantic managerial changes to carve out a respectable Premier League career over four years for Southampton. He did not become a regular player until the 1994–95 season when he made 28 league appearances without scoring as the "Saints" finished tenth in the league. He made a further 21 appearances in the 1995–96 season, scoring twice, as the "Saints" narrowly avoided relegation, but still reached the quarter finals of the FA Cup.

He was not far short of making 100 appearances in total when, in July 1996, Grimsby Town came in with a club record offer of £300,000 – as "Saints" had yet another new manager in Graeme Souness. Widdrington decided to accept their terms and headed to Blundell Park, turning down rival approaches from Charlton Athletic and Swindon Town as he was convinced by manager Brian Laws's sales pitch.

=== Grimsby Town ===
Grimsby were a struggling First Division side and Widdrington found a lot of disharmony in the dressing room, with Laws quickly departing. Widdrington fell out with Laws replacement, Alan Buckley, though he still enjoyed his time at the club. Grimsby suffered relegation at the end of the 1996–97 campaign, although Widdrington did score a memorable goal past Southend United on the last day of the season. They enjoyed an immediate return in 1997–98 after winning the play-off final against Northampton Town 1–0. However, injury meant that he missed out on the Football League Trophy final victory over AFC Bournemouth at Wembley. Widdrington played his last game for the "Mariners" towards the end of the 1998–99 season when he was loaned out to Port Vale for the final three months of the season.

=== Port Vale ===
At the end of the 1998–99 season Port Vale signed Widdrington (now out of contract, and transfer–listed) on a free transfer. He was sent off against Bury on the final day of the 1998–99 season, and he returned to action as the new club captain in 1999–2000 by getting sent off in the opening minute of a 4–2 defeat at Birmingham City after a dangerous tackle on Paul Furlong. Supporters voted him Player of the Year for the 1999–2000 season, as the "Valiants" suffered relegation into the Second Division.

Manager Brian Horton appointed Widdrington as club-captain for the 2000–01 season. He played every game of the club's League Trophy run, but played no part in the final. He made over 80 appearances at Vale Park before being released at the end of the 2000–01 season.

=== Later career ===
Linked with Colchester United, Widdrington instead moved north to join up with Hartlepool United. Manager Chris Turner had been particularly keen to sign him. He was a regular for the club and earned promotion to the Second Division with the club in the 2002–03 season, before he was released upon its conclusion. Manager Mike Newell was sacked the day after releasing him and Widdrington refused chairman Ken Hodcroft's offer to return to Victoria Park.

In July 2003 he was targeted by Oxford United. Instead Widdrington made his next port of call at Macclesfield Town, managed by former boss Brian Horton. He settled in quickly and became an indispensable player for the Third Division strugglers, acting as their captain for the 2004–05 season. In January 2005, Horton put him on the transfer list, and Widdrington then decided to call it a day at Macclesfield and in a twist, joined former club Port Vale on a non-contract basis. Manager Martin Foyle had brought him in to do some scouting, though asked him to return as a player following an injury to Danny Sonner.

=== Style of play ===
Widdrington was a midfielder, but could also fill in at full-back. He was tough and combative.

== Coaching career ==
=== Salisbury City ===
Widdrington joined Salisbury City in February 2005. His capture from Port Vale was an integral part of the club's development under manager Nick Holmes, helping the club to the highest point in its history. Over time his role became that of a coach, rather than a player.

On 8 September 2007, Widdrington was involved in a touchline incident with Rushden & Diamonds boss Garry Hill. The pair began arguing and Hill headbutted Widdrington, breaking his nose. Both men received fines from their clubs and Hill was also given a ten match touchline ban and a fine of £1,500. Later that year Widdrington was suspended by the club pending an 'internal disciplinary inquiry', but was soon allowed to return to work, with a statement being released saying: "No charges have been brought against Tommy and everyone at the club looks forward to working with him towards continued success." The following year Rushden banned him from Nene Park in the return fixture, despite no authorisation from The Football Association for the action.

He took over as manager in July 2009 after Nick Holmes took the role of general manager. He won the Conference National Manager of the Month award in April 2010. However, he left the club after they were expelled from the Conference National due to them entering administration.

=== Southend United & Hemel Hempstead Town ===
In July 2010, Widdrington was named assistant to new Southend United manager Paul Sturrock. His employment was terminated on 15 December 2010 as Sturrock needed "a fresh impetus". The club promoted from within by appointing Graham Coughlan as his replacement.

In October 2011, Widdrington was appointed as manager of struggling Southern League side Hemel Hempstead Town. His stay was short, as he found employment at a club in a higher league mid-way through the season.

=== Eastbourne Borough ===
In February 2012, Widdrington was appointed as manager of Eastbourne Borough, taking over from long-serving manager Garry Wilson, with the remit of keeping the club in the Conference South. He signed both Ronnie Bull and Stuart Anderson from Salisbury, and both Marvin Hamilton and Ellis Remy from Hemel Hampstead, also bringing in goalkeeper Mitch Walker on loan from Brighton & Hove Albion. They ended the 2011–12 season two places and two points above the drop zone, and went on to finish safely in 12th spot in 2012–13. After an unbeaten start to the 2013–14 season, Widdrington was named as the Conference South Manager of the Month for August. The "Sports" ended the 2013–14 campaign in tenth place.

After guiding Borough to top of the table with four wins and two draws at the start of the 2014–15 season he was named as Conference South Manager of the Month for the second-successive August. They ended the campaign in 11th place and then finished 17th in 2015–16. They won the Sussex Senior Challenge Cup in 2016 after beating Worthing 1–0 in the final at Falmer Stadium. He left the club by mutual consent on 7 April 2017, leaving Borough 11th in the National League South table, 20 points clear of relegation and 18 adrift of the play-off places.

=== Backroom roles ===
Widdrington was appointed head of recruitment at Coventry City on 10 April 2017. On 1 May 2018, he left Coventry City and took up a similar position at Bristol Rovers. His son, Theo, was signed up two months later. With the aim of recruiting players on a low wage to try and sell on for a profit, he also brought in: Jonson Clarke-Harris, Abu Ogogo, Anssi Jaakkola, Josh Hare, Tom Davies, Mark Little and Luke Leahy. Widdrington became the club's caretaker manager following the sacking of Ben Garner on 14 November 2020, with Rovers sitting 18th in League One. He oversaw a 4–3 victory over Chelsea U21 in the EFL Trophy on 18 November, before Paul Tisdale was appointed as permanent manager the following day.

On 10 February 2021, Widdrington was once again installed as caretaker manager following the dismissal of Paul Tisdale. He was in this position until Joey Barton was appointed as manager 11 days later, having overseen a 3–1 victory over Portsmouth and a 2–0 defeat to Gillingham. Following the club's relegation to League Two at the end of the 2020–21 season, the Director of Football role was removed from the club's board with Widdrington now taking on the role of Director in charge of outgoing loan deals and "ensuring the strategic vision is followed at all levels throughout the club". As the club moved into the new season, manager Joey Barton and Widdrington had a strained relationship with Barton claiming in October 2021 that he had no relationship with Widdrington or his scouting team. On 3 December 2021, Widdrington departed Bristol Rovers.

=== King's Lynn Town ===
On 10 December 2021, Widdrington was appointed manager of King's Lynn Town, who were second-from-bottom of the National League. His first match in charge was the following day and saw his new side defeat bottom side Dover Athletic 2–1 thanks to a double from Josh Barrett whom had been brought in to Bristol Rovers under Widdrington. Lynn's relegation to the National League North was confirmed in the penultimate match of the 2021–22 season with a 3–3 draw with Eastleigh.

An impressive start to life back in the sixth tier saw Widdrington awarded the National League North Manager of the Month award for August 2022 having earned 16 points from a possible 18. King's Lynn knocked League Two side Doncaster Rovers out of the first round of the FA Cup with a 1–0 win at the Eco-Power Stadium. On 1 April 2023, following a 1–0 victory to keep his side second in the league, Widdrington's resignation was announced to allow him to take a new role at another club. The club noted that no agreement had been reached between the two clubs or between King's Lynn Town and Widdrington.

=== Aldershot Town ===
The following day to his resignation from King's Lynn Town, Widdrington was announced as the new manager of National League strugglers Aldershot Town. Aldershot ended the 2022–23 campaign in 18th-place, five points above the relegation zone, having remained unbeaten for the final six games. He recruited Swiss striker Lorent Tolaj, persuading him to play non-League football in England rather than return to Switzerland.

On 3 November 2023, Widdrington signed new terms with Aldershot with the club in seventh place in the National League. The following day, his side won 7–4 at Swindon Town in the first round of the FA Cup, becoming the first non-League team to score seven goals past a Football League side in the competition. On 13 December 2023, Widdrington was named National League Manager of the Month for November having picked up three wins from four. Later that day, his side progressed to the FA Cup third round for the first time in eleven years, defeating League Two leaders Stockport County 1–0 away from home having drawn 2–2 at home in the previous fixture. They exited the competition with a 4–1 defeat at Championship side West Bromwich Albion with what he described as "a right good go". Aldershot ended the 2023–24 season with eighth place, two points outside the play-off places, having drawn to Dagenham & Redbridge on the final day. He was named as National League Manager of the Week on three occasions.

Widdrington underwent a leave of absence from his managerial role at Aldershot Town after suffering two strokes in late November. He returned to the dugout on 21 January 2025. He led the club to wins over Wealdstone, Chertsey Town, Boreham Wood and Sittingbourne in the 2024–25 FA Trophy campaign to reach the 2025 FA Trophy final. On 11 May, Widdrington led Aldershot out for the club's first ever visit to Wembley Stadium, defeating Spennymoor Town 3–0 to win the FA Trophy. On 14 October 2025, Widdrington announced his resignation as first-team manager.

=== Return to Eastbourne Borough ===
On 16 October 2025, Widdrington re-joined Eastbourne Borough as manager on a long-term contract, after eight years away. There was an initial upturn in Eastbourne's form after Widdrington's appointment. However, after a poor run of results at the start of 2026, Widdrington was relieved from his duties on 18 February.

== Personal life ==
Widdrington celebrated his goal for Port Vale against Brentford on 24 October 2000 with five bottles of Budweiser and subsequently crashed his BMW into a set of traffic lights in Hanley early the following morning. He was charged with refusing to take part in police drink-driving tests and entered a Guilty plea. He was banned from driving for 12 months and given a £500 fine.

Widdrington married Candice (née Arcon), whom he met as a teenager; the couple have two sons and a daughter. Their eldest son Kai is a professional dancer on Strictly Come Dancing. Their younger son Theo turned professional at Portsmouth in April 2017.

On 27 November 2024, Widdrington was taken to hospital having fallen ill, tests revealing that he had suffered two strokes.

== Career statistics ==
=== Playing statistics ===
Appearances and goals by club, season and competition
Club	Season	League			FA Cup		Other		Total	
Club	Season	Division	Apps	Goals	Apps	Goals	Apps	Goals	Apps	Goals
Southampton	1990–91	First Division	0	0	0	0	0	0	0	0
Southampton	1991–92	First Division	3	0	0	0	0	0	3	0
Southampton	1992–93	Premier League	12	0	0	0	1	0	13	0
Southampton	1993–94	Premier League	11	1	2	0	0	0	13	1
Southampton	1994–95	Premier League	28	0	5	0	1	0	34	0
Southampton	1995–96	Premier League	21	2	4	0	2	0	27	2
Southampton	Total		75	3	11	0	4	0	90	3
Wigan Athletic (loan)	1991–92	Third Division	6	0	0	0	2	0	8	0
Grimsby Town	1996–97	First Division	42	4	1	0	2	0	45	4
Grimsby Town	1997–98	Second Division	21	3	2	0	7	0	30	3
Grimsby Town	1998–99	First Division	26	1	1	0	5	0	32	1
Grimsby Town	Total		89	8	4	0	14	0	107	8
Port Vale	1998–99	First Division	9	1	—		—		9	1
Port Vale	1999–2000	First Division	38	5	1	0	0	0	39	5
Port Vale	2000–01	Second Division	35	2	1	0	5	0	41	2
Port Vale	Total		82	8	2	0	5	0	89	8
Hartlepool United	2001–02	Third Division	24	2	1	0	2	0	27	2
Hartlepool United	2002–03	Third Division	32	3	1	0	1	0	34	3
Hartlepool United	Total		56	5	2	0	3	0	61	5
Macclesfield Town	2003–04	Third Division	35	0	3	0	1	0	39	0
Macclesfield Town	2004–05	League Two	23	0	2	0	4	0	29	0
Macclesfield Town	Total		58	0	5	0	5	0	68	0
Port Vale	2004–05	League One	6	0	—		—		6	0
Career total			372	24	24	0	33	0	429	24

=== Managerial statistics ===
As of 18 February 2026

Managerial record by team and tenure
Team	From	To	Record					Ref.
Team	From	To	P	W	D	L	Win %	Ref.
Salisbury City	29 July 2009	5 July 2010	54	26	7	21	48.15	
Hemel Hempstead Town	5 October 2011	1 February 2012	19	5	8	6	26.32	
Eastbourne Borough	1 February 2012	7 April 2017	247	86	65	96	34.82	
Bristol Rovers (caretaker)	14 November 2020	19 November 2020	1	1	0	0	100.00	
Bristol Rovers (caretaker)	10 February 2021	22 February 2021	2	1	0	1	50.00	
King's Lynn Town	10 December 2021	1 April 2023	73	30	22	21	41.10	
Aldershot Town	2 April 2023	14 October 2025	133	53	33	47	39.85	
Eastbourne Borough	16 October 2025	18 February 2026	23	6	2	15	26.09	
Total			552	208	137	207	37.68	—

== Honours ==
=== As a player ===
Grimsby Town

- Football League Second Division play-offs: 1998
- Football League Trophy: 1997–98

Port Vale

- Football League Trophy: 2000–01

Hartlepool United

- Football League Third Division second-place promotion: 2002–03

Salisbury City

- Conference South play-offs: 2007
- Southern Football League Premier Division: 2005–06

Individual

- Port Vale Player of the Year: 1999–2000

=== As a manager ===
Eastbourne Borough

- Sussex Senior Challenge Cup: 2016

Aldershot Town

- FA Trophy: 2024–25

Individual

- Conference National / National League Manager of the Month: April 2010, November 2023
- Conference South Manager of the Month: August 2013, August 2014
- National League North Manager of the Month: August 2022
