= Danny Butterfield =

English footballer (born 1979)

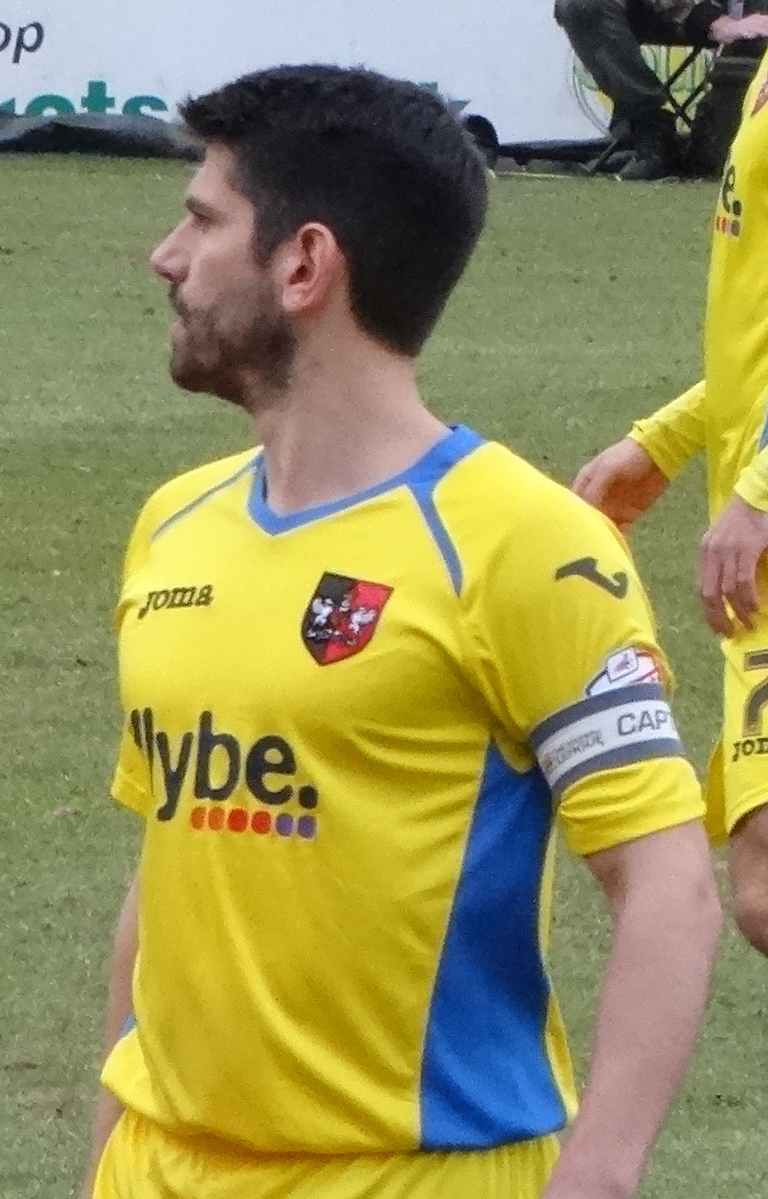
- Butterfield playing for Exeter City in 2015

Personal information
- Full name: Daniel Paul Butterfield
- Date of birth: 21 November 1979 (age 46)
- Place of birth: Boston, Lincolnshire, England
- Height: 5 ft 10 in (1.78 m)
- Position: Defender

Team information
- Current team: Hednesford Town (assistant)

Youth career
- 1993–1997: Grimsby Town

Senior career*
Years	Team	Apps	(Gls)
1997–2002	Grimsby Town	124	(3)
2002–2010	Crystal Palace	232	(6)
2009	→ Charlton Athletic (loan)	12	(0)
2010–2013	Southampton	44	(0)
2013	→ Bolton Wanderers (loan)	6	(0)
2013	Carlisle United	1	(0)
2013–2016	Exeter City	69	(0)
Total		488	(9)
- * Club domestic league appearances and goals

Daniel Paul Butterfield (born 21 November 1979) is an English former professional footballer and coach who is assistant manager at Northern Premier League club Hednesford Town.

Butterfield was born in Boston, Lincolnshire and played between 1997 and 2016 as a right back, and makeshift midfielder and centre back. He began his career as a youth with Grimsby Town where he remained for 6 years before joining Crystal Palace. He made 232 appearances for The Eagles before moving on to Charlton Athletic, Southampton, Bolton Wanderers, Carlisle United and Exeter City. Since retiring he has held various positions on the coaching staff at Southampton, Milton Keynes Dons, Macclesfield Town, Lincoln City, Eastleigh and Club Captain at AFC Foresters.

== Playing career ==
=== Grimsby Town ===
Butterfield was educated at Boston Grammar School in Boston, Lincolnshire. He was snapped up by Grimsby Town as a youngster, and was promoted to the club's first team setup midway through the 1996–1997 season. Butterfield was primarily used as a right back while at Blundell Park and made his first team debut in a 0–0 draw with York City on 9 September 1997. Butterfield went on to make eleven appearances in the 1997–1998 season, and scored his first senior goal in the club's 1–0 Football League Trophy victory over Hull City that season. Despite playing no part in either, Butterfield was among the winning squad who earned a double Wembley win that same season, triumphing in the Football League Trophy, as well as the Second Division play-off Final.

As the seasons progressed, Butterfield became more and more involved in first team, and converted mainly to a makeshift centre half. He was part of the Grimsby team that defeated Liverpool 2-1 at Anfield in the League Cup in September 2001, at 0–0 Butterfield kept Grimsby on level terms by clearing an Emile Heskey header off the line.

At the end of the 2001–02 season, Butterfield decided against a new contract and moved to Crystal Palace. In his five years at Grimsby Town from 1997 to 2002, Butterfield featured 124 times in the League, scoring 3 times playing all but one of his seasons with the Mariners in the second tier of English football. He played under three different managers, Alan Buckley, Lennie Lawrence and Paul Groves.

=== Crystal Palace ===
He arrived at Selhurst Park in 2002 where he quickly became a favourite of the crowd. He played regularly for the next two seasons, playing in the 2004 Football League First Division play-off final that resulted in Palace's promotion to the Premier League.

The form of Emmerson Boyce and long-term injuries restricted his appearances for the next two seasons, before re-establishing himself in the right-back spot for a spell. Midway through the 2008–09 season he was loaned out to Charlton Athletic, but he managed to regain his place in the Palace line-up the following season, despite his Eagles career appearing to be over.

Butterfield started the 2009–10 Football League Championship season as the main right back ahead of Nathaniel Clyne. However, due to Palace's financial problems, that saw them put into administration, he was converted to a makeshift striker. Butterfield scored a hat-trick in the space of 6 minutes and 48 seconds during a 2009–10 FA Cup fourth round replay 3–1 win against Wolves; he scored with his left foot, right foot and his head which is described as the 'perfect hat-trick'. This is the club's fastest ever hat-trick, beating the previous record set by Dougie Freedman in 11 minutes. Palace manager Neil Warnock revealed after the game that Clyne, who had played at right-back during the game, had turned down a move to Wolves only days earlier. Had the move gone through, Butterfield would have played at right-back instead. It was later revealed that Butterfield had only played up front in the game as a result of Warnock's wife, Sharon, having a dream the night before that he would score the winning goal.

=== Southampton ===
On 16 July 2010, he joined Southampton on a one-year deal and joined the squad in Interlaken ready for the game against FC Sochaux. On 7 August, Butterfield made his debut in a 1–0 loss against Plymouth. Since making his debut, Butterfield established himself in the starting eleven in the right back position. His good form kept Frazer Richardson out of the starting line-up and Southampton were promoted to the Championship for the 2011–12 season after their 3–1 win over Plymouth. In his first season, Butterfield made 38 appearances, supplying three assists. After the end of 2010–11 season, Butterfield signed another 12 months deal.

In his second season, Butterfield began to be used more sparingly after injury prevented him from training and he struggled to force his way back into the Southampton starting eleven. On 9 August 2011, Butterfield played 120 minutes in a match against Torquay United in a League Cup tie which Southampton won 4–1. His first league match of the 2011–12 season came on 29 October when he played 90 minutes against Middlesbrough and made an assist for Guly to score the first goal in the game in a 3–0 win. Despite his fitness and injury preventing him from playing, on 17 February 2012, Butterfield signed a one-year contract extension with the club, keeping him at Southampton until June 2013.

Following the signing of Nathaniel Clyne, Butterfield made no appearances for Southampton in the Premier League in 2012–13. On 28 March 2013, he moved on loan to Bolton Wanderers, managed by his former Crystal Palace teammate Dougie Freedman and assisted by Lennie Lawrence, his old manager at Grimsby. He made his debut two days later, coming on as a second-half substitute for Marvin Sordell in the away game at former club Charlton Athletic. He made his first start for Bolton at the Reebok Stadium in the 1–0 win against Huddersfield Town. Butterfield was released by Southampton on 4 June 2013 at the end of the 2012–13 season.

=== Carlisle United ===
On 23 August 2013 Butterfield signed on non-contract terms with League One side Carlisle United following an unsuccessful trial with then newly promoted Championship side AFC Bournemouth.

Butterfield made his debut on the same day in a 1–1 draw at Colchester United.

On 2 September 2013 Butterfield was released by mutual consent after having only made two appearances for Carlisle.

=== Exeter City ===
On 21 September 2013 Butterfield signed for League Two side Exeter City.

On 14 May 2015 Exeter manager Paul Tisdale appointed Butterfield as a player-coach. Butterfield departed the club and subsequently retired from playing football in September 2016, just over a month into the 2016–17 season.

== Coaching career ==
On 16 September 2016, Butterfield was appointed assistant manager of Southampton's Under-18 team. He left his academy coaching position with Southampton on 10 August 2018 and immediately joined League Two club Milton Keynes Dons as a first-team coach.

After achieving promotion with MK Dons from League Two at the conclusion of the 2018–19 season, Butterfield's contract with the club was terminated along with manager Paul Tisdale and assistant manager Matt Oakley on 2 November 2019 following a poor run of results.

He was appointed as assistant manager of Macclesfield Town in January 2020, under Mark Kennedy the pair initially steered Town to safety having avoided relegation from the Football League but a deduction of 17 points condemned them to relegation after the season had ended, sparing Stevenage. Butterfield and Kennedy left the club in August after rejecting new contracts.

In January 2021, Butterfield returned to Southampton as a loans manager for the clubs youth academy.

On 23 December 2022, Butterfield left Southampton and joined Lincoln City as assistant head coach, working under Mark Kennedy once again. On 18 October, he left Lincoln City with Mark Kennedy.

On 19 February 2024, Butterfield joined National League side Eastleigh as assistant manager. On 20 September 2025, Eastleigh parted ways with Butterfield.

On 11 February 2026, Butterfield joined National League North side Hednesford Town as assistant manager.

== Career statistics ==
Appearances and goals by club, season and competition
Club	Season	League			FA Cup		League Cup		Other		Total	
Club	Season	Division	Apps	Goals	Apps	Goals	Apps	Goals	Apps	Goals	Apps	Goals
Grimsby Town	1997–98	Second Division	7	0	1	0	1	0	2 (Note: Appearance(s) in Football League Trophy)	1	11	1
Grimsby Town	1998–99	First Division	12	0	0	0	2	0	–		14	0
Grimsby Town	1999–2000	First Division	29	0	2	0	4	0	–		35	0
Grimsby Town	2000–01	First Division	30	1	2	0	3	0	–		35	1
Grimsby Town	2001–02	First Division	46	2	2	0	4	0	–		52	2
Grimsby Town	Total		124	3	7	0	14	0	2	1	147	4
Crystal Palace	2002–03	First Division	46	1	4	0	5	0	–		55	1
Crystal Palace	2003–04	First Division	45	4	1	0	4	0	3 (Note: Appearances in Football League First Division play-offs)	1	53	5
Crystal Palace	2004–05	Premier League	7	0	1	0	2	0	–		10	0
Crystal Palace	2005–06	Championship	13	0	0	0	2	0	1 (Note: Appearance(s) in Football League Championship play-offs)	0	16	0
Crystal Palace	2006–07	Championship	28	0	2	0	0	0	–		30	0
Crystal Palace	2007–08	Championship	30	0	0	0	1	0	2	0	33	0
Crystal Palace	2008–09	Championship	26	1	3	0	1	0	–		30	1
Crystal Palace	2009–10	Championship	37	0	4	3	1	0	–		42	3
Crystal Palace	Total		232	6	15	3	16	0	6	1	269	10
Charlton Athletic (loan)	2008–09	Championship	12	0	0	0	0	0	–		12	0
Southampton	2010–11	League One	34	0	2	0	2	0	1	0	39	0
Southampton	2011–12	Championship	10	0	0	0	3	0	–		13	0
Southampton	2012–13	Premier League	0	0	0	0	2	0	–		2	0
Southampton	Total		44	0	2	0	7	0	1	0	54	0
Bolton Wanderers (loan)	2012–13	Championship	6	0	0	0	0	0	–		6	0
Carlisle United	2013–14	League One	1	0	0	0	0	0	0	0	1	0
Exeter City	2013–14	League Two	29	0	0	0	1	0	0	0	30	0
Exeter City	2014–15	League Two	30	0	1	0	1	0	1	0	33	0
Exeter City	2015–16	League Two	10	0	1	0	2	0	2	0	15	0
Exeter City	Total		69	0	2	0	3	0	3	0	77	0
Career total			488	9	28	3	41	0	12	2	569	14

== Honours ==
Crystal Palace

- Football League First Division play-offs: 2004

Southampton

- Football League One second-place promotion: 2010–11

Individual

- Grimsby Town Supporters' Young Player of the Year: 1998–99, 1999–2000
