= Peter Morrison (English footballer) =

English footballer

Personal information
- Date of birth: 29 June 1980 (age 46)
- Place of birth: Manchester, England
- Position: Midfielder

Youth career
- 1996–1997: Bolton Wanderers

Senior career*
Years	Team	Apps	(Gls)
1997–2000	Bolton Wanderers	0(2)	(0)
2000–2002	Scunthorpe United	18	(0)
Total		18	(0)
- * Club domestic league appearances and goals

Peter Morrison (born 29 June 1980) is an English Football Agent & former professional footballer who played as a midfielder for Bolton Wanderers & Scunthorpe United FC.

Morrison came through the youth academy at Bolton Wanderers and was part of the England U16 victory shield squad featuring Wes Brown, Steven Gerrard & Michael Owen. Morrison signed his first professional contract in 1997 at the age of 17. He joined Scunthorpe United in 2000 making 18 senior appearances before his career was cut short as the result of a serious injury sustained in a game v Grimsby Town in 2001, after which he became a football agent.

== Football career ==
=== As a player ===
Manchester-born Morrison joined the youth academy at Bolton Wanderers at the start of the 1996–97 season, straight from school. He turned professional at the age of 17, and was an unused substitute for the first team throughout the 1998–99 season. He remained at the Reebok Stadium until May 2000, when with a year still left on his Bolton contract, he joined Scunthorpe United, hoping for regular first-team football.

Morrison made his English Football League debut for Scunthorpe in a 1–0 win against Mansfield Town in August 2000. Under manager Brian Laws, Morrison featured in 24 first-team games in all competitions with the club, but on 14 February 2001, he suffered a horror tackle from Grimsby Town defender Ben Chapman in a reserve game which resulted in a double compound fracture to his left leg. The game was abandoned. The injury caused Morrison to retire from the game after 18 months of injury and seven operations. He was eventually awarded more than £450,000 compensation.

=== As an agent ===
Upon his premature retirement, Morrison embarked upon a career as a licensed football agent working for YMU Group in Manchester. His clients include Vincent Kompany, Nedum Onuoha and Ali Al-Habsi.

=== Death by dangerous driving charge ===
On 7 November 2017, Morrison was convicted at Carlisle Crown Court of causing death by dangerous driving, following an incident on the M6 motorway in Cumbria on 21 February 2016 when Adam Gibb, a Highways England Traffic Officer was killed and his Traffic Officer colleague Paul Holroyd was left paralysed from the chest down after being struck by a Mercedes 4x4 driven by Morrison. The court was told Morrison had been driving at average speeds of 81 mph and had exchanged 25 texts during his journey as well as texting 96 seconds before the fatal crash. Morrison pleaded guilty to causing death by careless driving, but denied the death by dangerous driving charge. Morrison described himself as "remorseful" and wrote a letter to the court stating: "I will punish myself, mentally, for this until the day I die."

On 19 January 2018, Morrison was found guilty of causing death by dangerous driving and was sentenced to seven years' imprisonment. He also received an eight-year driving ban. It was revealed in court that Morrison already had a previous conviction for using a mobile phone whilst driving.
