= FC JAX Destroyers =

- Full name: FC JAX Destroyers
- Nickname: Destroyers
- Founded: 2010
- Dissolved: 2012
- Ground: D. B. Milne Field; Jacksonville, Florida
- Capacity: 5,000
- Owner: (Colombia) Gonzalo Troncoso
- Head Coach: (Northern Ireland) Aidan Davison
- League: USL Premier Development League
- Website: http://www.jaxdestroyers.com
Home colors	Away colors

FC JAX Destroyers were an American soccer team based in Jacksonville, Florida, United States from 2011 to 2012. The organization had men's and women's franchises in the United Soccer Leagues: a men's team in the USL Premier Development League (PDL) and a women's team in the W-League that launched in 2012. They played their home games at the Jacksonville University soccer field.

== History ==
The team was founded in 2010 by FC JAX Soccer to fill a gap in organized men's and women's soccer in Jacksonville. The organization was officially announced on April 21, 2011 with plans for men's and women's franchises in the United Soccer Leagues, both playing under the FC JAX Destroyers name.

The men's team played from 2011–2012 in the USL Premier Development League, the fourth tier of soccer in the United States and Canada, in the Southeast Division of the Southern Conference. They played their home games at the newly renovated soccer field at Jacksonville University. Their first competitive game was on May 13, 2011, a 3–1 loss to Mississippi Brilla. The first goal in franchise history was an own goal scored by Mississippi's Thomas Shannon; the first JAX player to score a goal was Isaac Kinman, in a 2–0 victory over the Nashville Metros two days later.

The women's team played in the W-League, the second tier of women's soccer in the American Soccer Pyramid, in the 2012 season. Their first game was on May 19. However, FC Jax Destroyers withdrew from the United Soccer Leagues before the 2013 season.

== Year-by-year ==
Year	Division	League	Regular season	Playoffs	Open Cup
2011	4	USL PDL	4th, Southeast	Did not qualify	Did not qualify
2012		USL PDL	Southeast		

== Head coaches ==
- (Northern Ireland) Aidan Davison (July 2011 – 2012)
- (United States) Eric Dutt (April 2011 – June 2011)
- (United States) Marc Osterberger Women's coach (March 2012 – July 2012)

== Stadium ==
- D. B. Milne Field at Jacksonville University; Jacksonville, Florida (2011–2012)
