= David Smith (footballer, born 1968) =

English footballer (born 1968)

Personal information
- Date of birth: 29 March 1968 (age 58)
- Place of birth: Stonehouse, Gloucestershire, England
- Height: 5 ft 8 in (1.73 m)
- Positions: Left-back; winger

Youth career
- 1984–1986: Coventry City

Senior career*
Years	Team	Apps	(Gls)
1986–1993	Coventry City	154	(19)
1993	→ AFC Bournemouth (loan)	1	(0)
1993–1994	Birmingham City	38	(3)
1994–1998	West Bromwich Albion	102	(2)
1998–2002	Grimsby Town	112	(9)
2002–2003	Swansea City	4	(1)
Total		411	(34)

International career
1988–1989	England U21	10	(0)
- * Club domestic league appearances and goals

David Smith (born 29 March 1968) is an English former professional footballer who played as a midfielder.

Smith played professionally between 1986 and 2003 for Coventry City, AFC Bournemouth, Birmingham City, West Bromwich Albion, Grimsby Town and Swansea City, making more than 400 appearances in the Football League and Premier League. He won 10 caps for the England under-21 team. He returned to Grimsby in 2004 and was part of the clubs backroom staff in several commercial positions before becoming commercial manager, a role he remained in until September 2022.

== Career ==
=== Early career ===
Smith started his career at Coventry City after signing professional terms with the club in 1986. He had previously attended trials at Arsenal, Nottingham Forest, Wolverhampton Wanderers, Luton Town, Swindon Town, and Bristol Rovers before becoming an apprentice at Coventry City in 1984. Four years on he made his debut as a teenager in the Premier League against Manchester United at Old Trafford, this ended in a 1–0 defeat. Smith became a regular in the side and earned several England under 21 caps. He soon became a Sky Blue's fan favourite due to his fast and exciting wing play.

After a loan spell at AFC Bournemouth where he made one league appearance in 1993 he moved to Birmingham City where he spent a season before moving to local rivals West Bromwich Albion under Alan Buckley. He spent four years at the club.

=== Grimsby Town ===
Smith re-joined Alan Buckley halfway through the 1997–1998 season. He scored on his debut for the club in a 4–0 win over Brentford in a league match at Blundell Park. Smith helped Grimsby Town win the Auto Windscreens Shield.

One of his most notable moments at Grimsby Town was when he scored in the first-leg of the Division 2 play-off semi-final against Fulham in the 1997–1998 season, a careless pass by Fulham's Wayne Collins enabled Smith to latch on and score an equaliser. He also was in the team that won the Second Division play-offs, gaining promotion to the First Division.

On 31 August 1998, he was instrumental in the thrashing of his old club, he provided two assists and a goal in the 5–1 home tie against West Bromwich Albion, he took a corner for Peter Handyside to head home from close range in the 6th minute, then on 17 minutes Smith's free kick was met by Richard Smith and Wayne Burnett placed a half-volley past Alan Miller, then in the 27th minute Jack Lester beat two men down the right before the striker crossed the ball for Smith to score.

On 19 August 2000, he scored an equaliser in the 84th minute in the 1–1 draw against Portsmouth, Smith was unmarked and sent a left-foot volley past goalkeeper Russell Hoult after a Kevin Donovan cross from the right.

On 2 March 2002, he scored the 5th goal in the 88th minute for the 'Mariners' in the 5–2 victory against promotion-chasing Crystal Palace, after some well worked movement by Danny Butterfield he passed to Smith who slotted the ball home. He continued as a regular first-team player until he picked up an injury in a 2001–02 game against Gillingham. Smith was a key member of that squad, proving his versatility by performing as a deputy for Tony Gallimore and regularly playing there for tactical reasons.

=== Swansea City ===
He moved to Swansea City for the 2002–03 season on a 12-month deal playing in the Third Division. Several injuries prevented him from making an impact and he only managed four appearances all season, scoring once. He left Swansea at the end of the season and soon after retired.

== Personal life ==
Upon retiring from professional football in 2003, Smith returned to Grimsby where he briefly worked in a local car dealership, before going into marketing. He was appointed as the assistant commercial manager at Grimsby Town F.C. in 2003. He eventually became the commercial manager.

On 6 September 2022, Smith announced he would be leaving Grimsby following nearly 20 years service as the clubs commercial manager, following his five years service as a player. Smith stated "It has been an honour and a privilege for me to play and work at Grimsby Town. Football has been my life. It's not easy stepping back, but we now have more support for the commercial activities at the Club meaning I can step back at exactly the time when my family, particularly my elderly parents, need me more".

== Honours ==
Grimsby Town

- Football League Second Division play-offs: 1998
- Football League Trophy: 1997–98
