= Wayne Thomas (footballer, born 1978) =

English footballer

Personal information
- Full name: Wayne Thomas
- Date of birth: 28 August 1978 (age 48)
- Place of birth: Walsall, England
- Position: Midfielder

Senior career*
Years	Team	Apps	(Gls)
1996–2000	Walsall	38	(0)
1997	→ Kidderminster Harriers (loan)		
1999	→ Mansfield Town (loan)	5	(0)
2000–2001	Shrewsbury Town	17	(1)
2001	Hednesford Town		
Total		60	(1)
- * Club domestic league appearances and goals

Wayne Thomas (born 28 August 1978) is an English former professional footballer who played in the Football League for Mansfield Town, Shrewsbury Town and Walsall.
