= Jimmy Glass =

English footballer (born 1973)

Personal information
- Full name: James Robert Glass
- Date of birth: 1 August 1973 (age 53)
- Place of birth: Epsom, Surrey, England
- Position: Goalkeeper

Youth career
- 1987–1988: Chelsea
- 1988–1989: Crystal Palace

Senior career*
Years	Team	Apps	(Gls)
1989–1996	Crystal Palace	0	(0)
1989–1990	→ Dulwich Hamlet (loan)	14	(0)
1995	→ Portsmouth (loan)	3	(0)
1995	→ Gillingham (loan)	0	(0)
1996	→ Burnley (loan)	0	(0)
1996–1998	AFC Bournemouth	95	(0)
1998–2000	Swindon Town	11	(0)
1999	→ Carlisle United (loan)	3	(1)
2000	Cambridge United	0	(0)
2000	Brentford	2	(0)
2000–2001	Oxford United	1	(0)
2001	Crawley Town	17	(0)
2001	Brockenhurst	3	(0)
2001	Kingstonian	14	(0)
2001	Lewes	3	(0)
2004	Weymouth	3	(0)
Total		169	(1)
- * Club domestic league appearances and goals

James Robert Glass (born 1 August 1973) is an English former professional footballer who played as a goalkeeper.

He is chiefly remembered for scoring the last-minute goal against Plymouth Argyle which kept Carlisle United in the Football League in 1999, while on loan from Swindon Town. The drama of Glass's late goal, which came in one of only three games that he played for Carlisle, has since made it famous in English football at a level beyond its immediate ramifications.

Beyond the Carlisle goal, Glass's most notable time with a club was three seasons playing for AFC Bournemouth from 1996 to 1998, his only regular spell at a Football League club; he retired from football in 2001 aged 27.

== Career ==
=== Early career ===
Glass had a journeyman's career in football, playing for many clubs, initially as a reserve keeper for Crystal Palace. He never played a first team game for the Eagles, but was an unused substitute several times, including the 1995 FA Cup semi-final replay against Manchester United, which Palace lost 2–0 at Villa Park. He was transferred to AFC Bournemouth a year later.

The closest he came to a trophy in senior football was reaching the final of the Football League Trophy with Bournemouth in 1998 – Glass scored an own goal in the match, and Bournemouth lost 2–1. It was the last own goal scored at the old Wembley. Glass moved to Swindon Town in the summer of 1998, but after falling out with the manager, Jimmy Quinn, was unable to gain a regular place in the team.

=== Carlisle United ===
He moved to Carlisle United on loan from Swindon late that season (after goalkeeper Tony Caig was sold to Blackpool and Richard Knight's loan period had been cut short due to injury). His moment of fame came on 8 May 1999, in the final match of the 1998–99 Third Division season against Plymouth Argyle, which Carlisle needed to win to avoid relegation. With the score 1–1 with only ten seconds remaining, and Carlisle winning a corner, Glass came up from his own penalty area and promptly scored a last minute goal, volleying the ball in after the Plymouth goalkeeper had parried out Scott Dobie's goalbound header. Carlisle got the win they needed and Scarborough were relegated to the Football Conference instead after a 1–1 draw with Peterborough United. Scarborough's match had already finished before Glass scored, and their fans had already been celebrating on the pitch at the McCain Stadium.

So ... deep, deep, deep, I make it sixty seconds. Jimmy Glass knocks it long. It comes now to Bagshaw. Bagshaw back to Anthony. Up to Stevens ... and the ball goes out now for a corner to Carlisle United – will they have time to take it? Referee looks at his watch ... and here comes Jimmy Glass! Carlisle United goalkeeper Jimmy Glass is coming up for the kick – everyone is going up ... there isn't one player in the Carlisle half! Well, well ... and the corner kick comes in ... and ... the goalkeeper's punch ... oh ... Jimmy Glass! Jimmy Glass! Jimmy Glass, the goalkeeper, has scored a goal for Carlisle United! There's a pitch invasion! There is a pitch invasion! The referee has been swamped – they're bouncing on the crossbar!

— Commentator Derek Lacey, BBC Radio Cumbria

His goal was selected as the 72nd greatest sporting moment ever by the Channel 4 programme 100 Greatest Sporting Moments. The goal was also ranked 7th in The Times newspaper's list of the 50 most important goals in football history. His goal against Plymouth Argyle was number 15 in the 20 Goals That Shook the World on ITV4. The Puma boots with which he scored the goal were donated to the National Football Museum in 2014.

=== After Carlisle United ===
Despite his brief fame, this was the last of just three matches Glass played at Carlisle, who were unable to sign him on a permanent basis. Glass spent time at several other clubs, including Oxford United and Brentford, before moving to non-league clubs, and then quitting football altogether. He reportedly scored six goals two weeks running whilst playing Sunday league football in Bournemouth, playing as a striker. He wrote an autobiography, entitled One Hit Wonder.

Author Gabriel Kuhn described Glass's fame by saying:

Football allows for magic experiences and incredible personal stories, such as when no-name goalkeeper Jimmy Glass saved Carlisle United from relegation to amateur football (sic) in 1999 with a last-minute goal, only to disappear into anonymity again shortly after.

== After football ==
Glass retired from professional football at the age of 27, and became an IT salesman. He later became a taxi driver in Dorset, before becoming the managing director of a taxi company.

In a 2013 BBC interview Glass stated: "It is quite tough because some go on to fame and fortune and some go on to driving a cab and living a normal life like me. It is quite difficult to understand your place in life from being this guy who will never be forgotten to being the guy worrying about your next bill. The goal was an amazing part of my life and is there to be enjoyed, and I will until people get bored of me. Someone on Saturday will be a hero and someone will be a villain. It is an incredible feeling."

In October 2011, it was announced that Glass joined Poole Town as the new goalkeeping coach, working on a voluntary basis. He also had a job in hospitality at AFC Bournemouth and became their Player Liaison Officer in 2016.

On 4 July 2023, Glass was appointed general manager at Wimborne Town. His responsibilities include "managing and developing the club's operational programmes, community initiatives and footballing infrastructure".

== Honours ==
Bournemouth

- Football League Trophy runner-up: 1997–98

== See also ==
- List of goalscoring goalkeepers
