= Ben Chapman (footballer, born 1979) =

English footballer and coach

Personal information
- Full name: Benjamin Chapman
- Date of birth: 2 March 1979 (age 47)
- Place of birth: Scunthorpe, England
- Position: Defender

Youth career
- 1995–1997: Grimsby Town

Senior career*
Years	Team	Apps	(Gls)
1997–2002	Grimsby Town	21	(0)
2002–2004	Boston United	74	(0)
2004–2005	Alfreton Town	29	(0)
2005–2006	Northwich Victoria	29	(0)
2006–2007	Nuneaton Borough	34	(0)
2007–2009	King's Lynn	39	(3)
2009	Eastwood Town		
2009–2010	Harrogate Town		
2010–2011	Frickley Athletic		
2011	Appleby Frodingham		
2011	Hall Road Rangers		
2011–2012	Appleby Frodingham		
2012	Bottesford Town		
2017–2018	Armthorpe Welfare		
- * Club domestic league appearances and goals

Benjamin Chapman (born 2 March 1979), is an English former professional footballer and coach who played as a left back.

He notably played in the Football League for Grimsby Town where he started his career, and then Boston United where he was club captain. He has since forged a career in Non-league playing for Alfreton Town, Northwich Victoria, Nuneaton Borough, King's Lynn, Eastwood Town, Harrogate Town, Frickley Athletic, Hall Road Rangers and Bottesford Town.

== Playing career ==
=== Grimsby Town ===
Chapman came through the youth ranks with professional club Grimsby Town and signed professionally with The Mariners in 1997. He made his first team debut for the club in a 1–0 victory over local rivals Hull City in the Football League Trophy in January 1998. He would have to wait another 18 months before he was called up for action again, and made a run out against Watford. Ben was used as the club's reserve left back and was understudy to Tony Gallimore, Chapman only managed 2 appearances in both the 1999–2000 and 2000–2001 season and would have to wait until the 2001–2002 campaign before he started to have a regular run in first team affairs. Notably that season Chapman played for Grimsby on both Anfield and Highbury as Grimsby recorded a historic cup win over Liverpool before being knocked out by Arsenal. In the Liverpool game, a Grimsby corner resulted in Chapman volleying just close over the crossbar and was Grimsby's only clear cut chance in the first half of play. He would go on to never get on the score sheet for the club. While playing for Grimsby, Chapman was responsible for ending the career of Scunthorpe United midfielder Peter Morrison during a pre season friendly in 2001. The game was abandoned as a result of the injury, and eventually following court proceedings, Morrison was rewarded a £400,000 compensation pay out.

=== Boston United ===
In July 2002 Grimsby captured Welsh International left back Darren Barnard on a free transfer thus resulting in Chapman's release from the club. He signed for Boston United and became the team's captain, and was able to give his new teammates a helping hand as The Pilgrims avoided relegation from the Third Division. Ben stayed with Boston until the end of the 2003–2004 season, and after that he was released.

=== Non League ===
After spending a week training with his former club Grimsby and appearing in a pre-season friendly, Ben went on to sign for Non League side Alfreton Town for a season, before linking up Northwich Victoria the following season, in his only season with the Vics he helped the club gain promotion from the Conference North division. He then went on to join Nuneaton Borough for the 2006–2007 season. In the summer of 2007 Chapman joined King's Lynn. He stayed with The Linnets until March 2009, where he signed for Eastwood Town. Chapman was released two months later following the end of the season, and joined Harrogate Town in October 2009.

He went on to play for Frickley Athletic before moving to Hall Road Rangers as well as having two spells with Appleby Frodingham and later playing for Bottesford Town. Chapman remained without a club for the 2012–13 season but in May 2013 he went on trial with Scarborough Athletic.

== Coaching career ==
Chapman joined Armthorpe Welfare as a coach in January 2017. A month later he was promoted to assistant manager as well as also registering as a player.

== Honours ==
=== Eastwood Town ===
- Northern Premier League champions: 2008–09

=== Grimsby Town ===
- Second Division play-off winner: 1997–98
- Football League Trophy winner: 1997–98

=== Northwich Victoria ===
- Conference North winner: 2005–06

=== King's Lynn ===
- Southern League Premier Division champions 2007-08
