= Franck Rolling =

French footballer (born 1968)

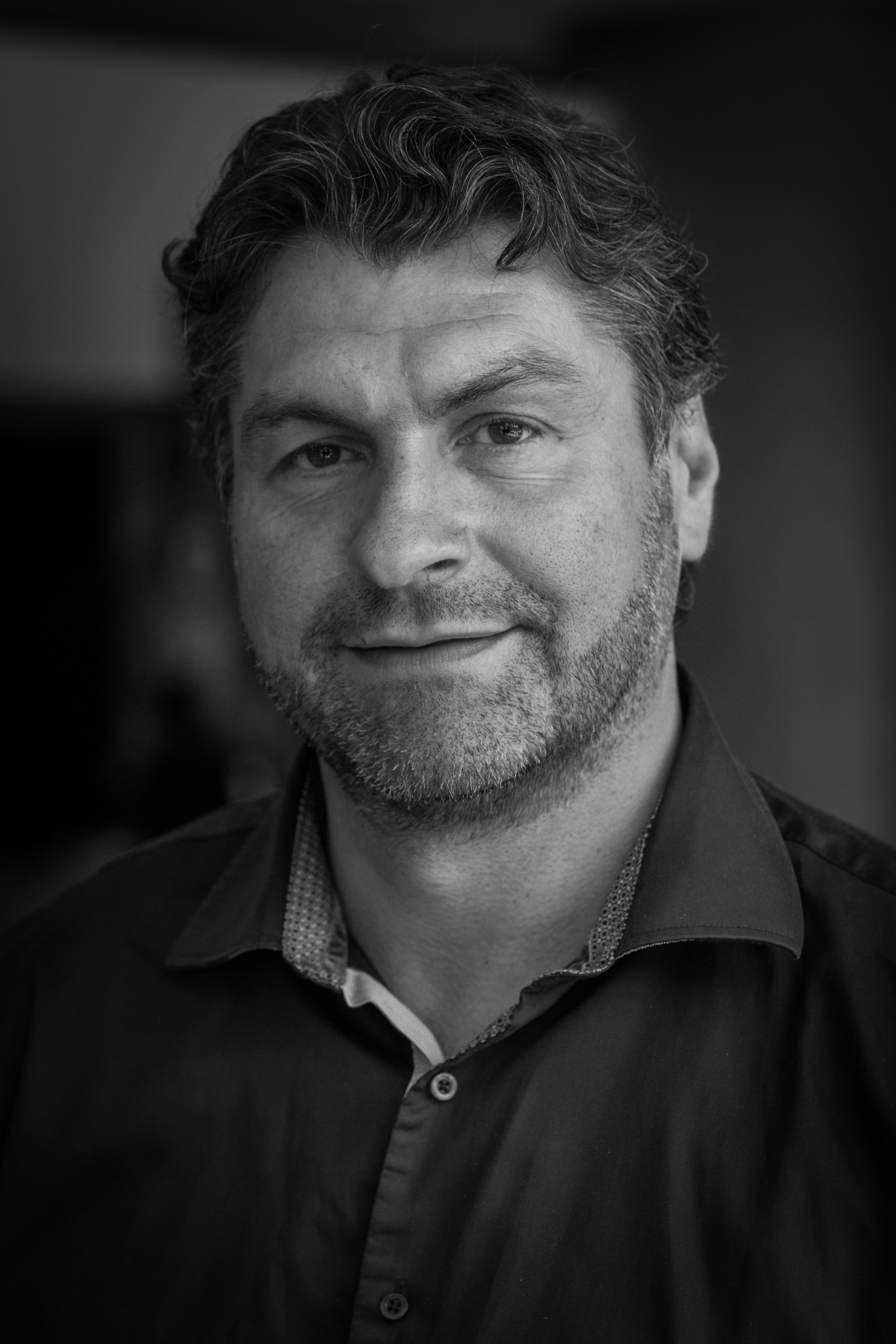
- Rolling, 2014

Personal information
- Full name: Franck Jacques Rolling
- Date of birth: 23 August 1968 (age 58)
- Place of birth: Colmar, Haut-Rhin, France
- Height: 1.83 m (6 ft 0 in)
- Position: Centre-back

Senior career*
Years	Team	Apps	(Gls)
1986–1992	RC Strasbourg	41	(4)
1992–1994	Pau FC		
1994–1995	Ayr United	35	(2)
1995–1997	Leicester City	18	(0)
1997–1998	AFC Bournemouth	31	(6)
1998	Gillingham	1	(0)
1998	Wycombe Wanderers	0	(0)
1999	SK Vorwärts Steyr	11	(0)
1999–2000	Veria F.C.	9	(1)
2000–2001	Jura Sud Lavans		
- * Club domestic league appearances and goals

Franck Jacques Rolling (born 23 August 1968) is a French former footballer who played as a centre-back.

== Career ==
Rolling began his career as an attacking player at RC Strasbourg, making his debut in a game against Sporting Club Toulon on 15 October 1988. However Rolling did not manage to carve out a regular first team place and so dropped down a division in 1992 to join Pau FC. He moved to Scotland with Ayr United F.C. in 1994 and was spotted there by Leicester City F.C. who brought him to England the following year for a fee of £100,000. Rolling found it hard to get a spot in the Foxes first team, particularly after their promotion to the Premier League. He departed Filbert Street in 1997 to join AFC Bournemouth and made something of a name for himself at the club by scoring two goals in the two-leg Associate Members' Cup Southern Final, booking the club a place at the Wembley showpiece. He was an unused substitute for the final (1-2 defeat vs. Grimsby), after which his relationship with the manager had irretrievably broken down.

After his release from Bournemouth, Rolling was briefly on the books of Gillingham F.C. and Wycombe Wanderers F.C., before leaving England to try his luck with SK Vorwärts Steyr of Austria (who went into bankruptcy during the season) and Veria F.C. of Greece. He returned to France in 2001 to play for Jura Sud Lavans, retiring the following year.
