= 1997–98 Football League Trophy =

Auto Windscreens Shield

Tournament details
- Country: England; Wales
- Teams: 48

Final positions
- Champions: Grimsby Town
- Runners-up: AFC Bournemouth

Tournament statistics
- Matches played: 49

The Football League Trophy 1997–98, known as the Auto Windscreens Shield 1997–98 for sponsorship reasons, was the 17th staging of the Football League Trophy, a knock-out competition for English football clubs in Second and Third Division. The winners were Grimsby Town and the runners-up were AFC Bournemouth.

The competition began on 6 December 1997 and ended with the final on 19 April 1998 at the Wembley Stadium.

In the first round, there were two sections: North and South. In the following rounds each section gradually eliminates teams in knock-out fashion until each has a winning finalist. At this point, the two winning finalists face each other in the combined final for the honour of the trophy.

== First round ==
Blackpool, Burnley, Macclesfield Town, Mansfield Town, Notts County, Rotherham United, Wrexham and York City from the North section all received byes.

Brentford, AFC Bournemouth, Brighton & Hove Albion, Bristol City, Exeter City, Luton Town, Swansea City and Torquay United from the South section all received byes.

=== Northern Section ===
Date	Home team	Score	Away team
6 December	Shrewsbury Town	1–2	Hartlepool United
9 December	Carlisle United	1 – 0	Oldham Athletic
9 December	Chesterfield	0–1	Grimsby Town
9 December	Doncaster Rovers	0–1	Rochdale
9 December	Hull City	2–1	Scarborough
9 December	Preston North End	3 – 2	Darlington
9 December	Scunthorpe United	2–1	Chester City
9 December	Wigan Athletic	2–0	Lincoln City

=== Southern Section ===
Date	Home team	Score	Away team
8 December	Bristol Rovers	1–0	Cambridge United
9 December	Barnet	1–2	Walsall
9 December	Cardiff City	0–2	Millwall
9 December	Fulham	1–0	Watford
9 December	Gillingham	0–1	Peterborough United
9 December	Leyton Orient	1–0	Colchester United
9 December	Northampton Town	1 – 1	Plymouth Argyle
Northampton Town won 5 – 3 on penalties
9 December	Southend United	0–1	Wycombe Wanderers

== Second round ==
=== Northern Section ===
Date	Home team	Score	Away team
6 January	Blackpool	1 – 1	York City
Blackpool won 10 – 9 on penalties
6 January	Carlisle United	6–1	Rochdale
6 January	Grimsby Town	1–0	Hull City
6 January	Hartlepool United	1–2	Scunthorpe United
7 January	Mansfield Town	1–0	Wrexham
13 January	Macclesfield Town	0–1	Preston North End
20 January	Wigan Athletic	3–0	Rotherham United
27 January	Burnley	2–0	Notts County

=== Southern Section ===
Date	Home team	Score	Away team
6 January	AFC Bournemouth	2–0	Leyton Orient
6 January	Bristol City	1–0	Millwall
6 January	Exeter City	1–2	Bristol Rovers
6 January	Swansea City	1–2	Peterborough United
6 January	Walsall	5–0	Brighton & Hove Albion
13 January	Fulham	3–1	Wycombe Wanderers
13 January	Luton Town	2–1	Brentford
13 January	Northampton Town	5–1	Torquay United

== Quarter-finals ==
=== Northern Section ===
Date	Home team	Score	Away team
27 January	Blackpool	1–0	Wigan Athletic
27 January	Preston North End	1–0	Mansfield Town
27 January	Scunthorpe United	0–2	Grimsby Town
3 February	Burnley	4–1	Carlisle United

=== Southern Section ===
Date	Home team	Score	Away team
27 January	AFC Bournemouth	1–0	Bristol City
27 January	Fulham	1–2	Luton Town
27 January	Peterborough United	2–1	Northampton Town
28 January	Bristol Rovers	0 – 1	Walsall

== Area semi-finals ==
=== Northern Section ===
Date	Home team	Score	Away team
17 February	Burnley	1–0	Preston North End
17 February	Grimsby Town	1–0	Blackpool

=== Southern Section ===
Date	Home team	Score	Away team
17 February	AFC Bournemouth	1–0	Luton Town
17 February	Peterborough United	1–2	Walsall

== Area finals ==
=== Northern Area final ===
10 March 1998
19:45

Grimsby Town	1–1	Burnley
Groves 78'		Payton 23'

Blundell Park, Cleethorpes
Attendance: 6,064
17 March 1998
19:45

Burnley	0–2	Grimsby Town
		Nogan 10'; Donovan 57'

Turf Moor, Burnley
Attendance: 10,257

Grimsby Town beat Burnley 3–1 on aggregate.

=== Southern Area final ===
10 March 1998
19:45

Walsall	0–2	AFC Bournemouth
		Rolling 13'; Beardsmore 30'

Bescot Stadium, Walsall
Attendance: 6,017
17 March 1998
19:45

AFC Bournemouth	2–3	Walsall
Evans 55' (o.g.); Rolling 82'		Thomas 47'; Boli 53'; Tholot 80'

Dean Court, Bournemouth
Attendance: 8,972

AFC Bournemouth beat Walsall 4–3 on aggregate.

== Final ==
19 April 1998
15:00 BST

AFC Bournemouth	1–2	Grimsby Town
Bailey 31'		Glass 75' (o.g.); Burnett 112'

Wembley Stadium, London
Attendance: 62,432
Referee: M.E. Pierce

AFC Bournemouth	Grimsby Town

GK	1	Jimmy Glass
DF	2	Neil Young
DF	3	Jamie Vincent
DF	4	Eddie Howe	Booked
DF	5	Ian Cox
MF	6	John Bailey	Booked
MF	7	Russell Beardsmore		(substituted off) 105'
MF	8	Steve Robinson
FW	9	Mark Stein
FW	10	Steve Fletcher
MF	11	Christer Warren		(substituted off) 90'
Substitutes:
DF		Franck Rolling
MF		Jason Brissett		(substituted on) 90'
MF		John O'Neil		(substituted on) 105'
Manager:
Mel Machin

GK	1	Aidan Davison
DF	2	John McDermott	Booked
DF	3	Tony Gallimore		(substituted off) 55'
DF	4	Peter Handyside
DF	5	Mark Lever
MF	6	Wayne Burnett	Booked
MF	7	Kevin Donovan
MF	8	David Smith	Booked
FW	9	Daryl Clare		(substituted off) 55'
FW	10	Lee Nogan		(substituted off) 93'
MF	11	Paul Groves (c)
Substitute:
FW	12	Steve Livingstone	Booked	(substituted on) 55'
MF	13	Kingsley Black	(substituted on) 55'
MF	14	Kevin Jobling	(substituted on) 93'
Manager:
Alan Buckley

Match rules

- 90 minutes
- 30 minutes of extra-time if necessary
- Golden goal in extra time
- Penalty shoot-out if scores still level
- Maximum of three substitutions
