= Daryl Clare =

Irish professional footballer and coach (born 1978)

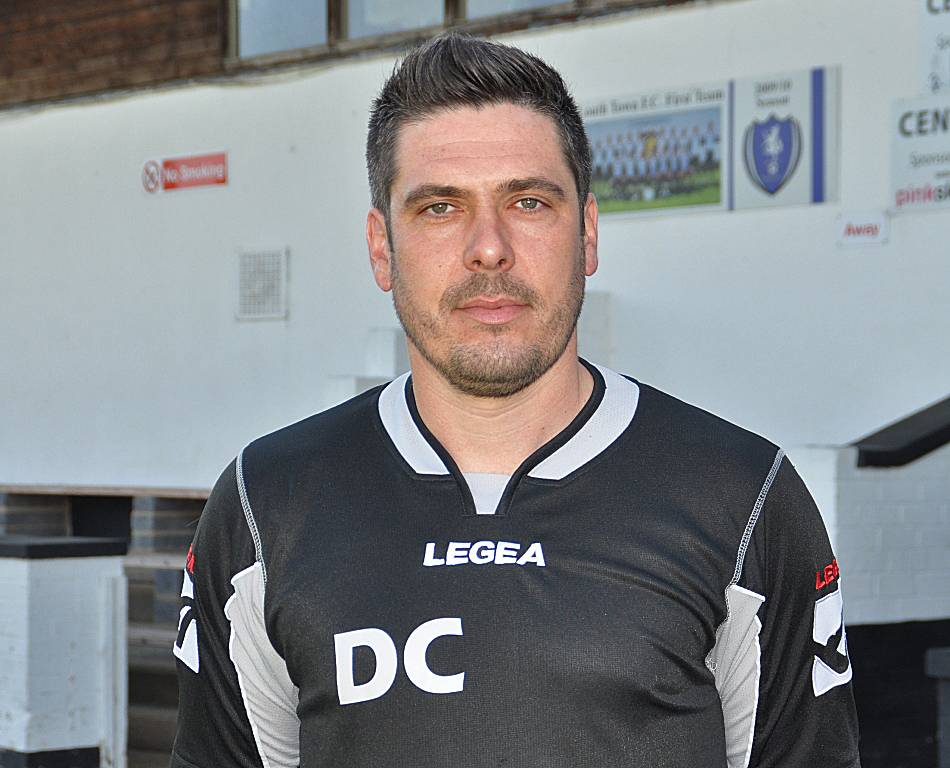

Personal information
- Full name: Daryl Adam Clare
- Date of birth: 1 August 1978 (age 48)
- Place of birth: Jersey, Channel Islands
- Position: Striker

Youth career
- 1991–1996: Grimsby Town

Senior career*
Years	Team	Apps	(Gls)
1996–2001	Grimsby Town	79	(9)
1999–2000	→ Northampton Town (loan)	10	(3)
2000	→ Northampton Town (loan)	4	(0)
2001	→ Cheltenham Town (loan)	4	(0)
2001–2002	Boston United	47	(25)
2002–2004	Chester City	62	(48)
2004–2005	Boston United	20	(3)
2005–2006	Crawley Town	25	(11)
2006–2008	Burton Albion	88	(37)
2008–2009	Rushden & Diamonds	12	(5)
2009	→ Mansfield Town (loan)	9	(1)
2009–2010	Mansfield Town	9	(2)
2009–2010	→ Gateshead (loan)	7	(8)
2010	Gateshead	19	(5)
2010–2011	Cambridge United	20	(1)
2011	→ Alfreton Town (loan)	16	(4)
2011	→ Gainsborough Trinity (loan)	4	(0)
2012–2013	Louth Town	22	(4)
2013–2016	Boston Town	25	(5)
Total		482	(189)

International career^{‡}
- Republic of Ireland U21
1999	Republic of Ireland B	1	(2)

Managerial career
- 2012–2013: Louth Town
- 2016: Boston Town
- * Club domestic league appearances and goals as of 23 September 2010 ‡ National team caps and goals as of 16 October 2009

Daryl Adam Clare (born 1 August 1978) is a former professional footballer and coach. He is a football coach at Grimsby Institute of Further & Higher Education.

As a player he was a striker from 1996 to 2016 for Grimsby Town, Northampton Town, Cheltenham Town, Boston United, Chester City, Crawley Town, Burton Albion, Rushden & Diamonds, Mansfield Town, Gateshead, Cambridge United and Gainsborough Trinity. He has twice won the Conference Golden Boot for the season's leading scorer. He won the Football Conference title twice, with Boston United in 2002 and Chester in 2004. He has represented the Republic of Ireland at under-21 and B international level.

== Club career ==
Born in the island of Jersey, Clare had moved to Grimsby as a youngster and made his league debut for Grimsby Town near the end of the 1995–96 season when he came on as a substitute at home against Sheffield United on 20 April 1996. At the time he was 17 years of age. His next appearance came a year and a half later, against Southend United, while his first start came against Carlisle United on 20 December 1997, when he was selected due to the injuries of Lee Nogan and Jack Lester. The team won that game 1–0 thanks to a goal from John McDermott. That year Clare was part of the Town side that won promotion from the Second Division via the play-offs, though he took no part in the play-off final, and played on the winning side in the Football League Trophy. He was voted as young player of the year for both Grimsby and the Republic of Ireland. During his time at Grimsby Town he had two loan spells at Northampton Town and one at Cheltenham Town.

Clare joined Boston United on a free transfer in July 2001 after a trial there. He was a prolific goalscorer at Boston, scoring 24 goals in the Football Conference as he helped them to win promotion to the Football League at the end of the 2001–02 season. He was transfer-listed by the club in September 2002 after refusing to be selected for a place as a substitute, and joined Chester City six weeks later, where his 29 league goals in the 2003–04 season contributed to the club's return to the Football League. He returned to Boston in November 2004, before joining Conference side Crawley Town in August 2005 for a club record fee. He left Crawley in March 2006 after the club ran into financial difficulties, and joined Burton Albion. He scored 18 goals in his first season at Burton and signed a new one-year contract in May 2007. He scored two goals in a losing cause in the semi-final of the play-offs. After scoring 42 goals in 93 games for Burton, he rejected the offer of a new contract and joined Rushden & Diamonds for the 2008–09 season. He requested a transfer in January 2009 so as to be closer to his family, and media speculation suggested that he had become a transfer target for Gainsborough Trinity, although this move failed to materialise. Clare was signed on loan until the end of the season by Mansfield Town on 10 March. He scored on his debut after coming on as a substitute away at Grays Athletic. He signed for Mansfield permanently on a one-year contract on 22 May and joined Gateshead on a three-month loan on 16 October. Clare signed a permanent contract with Gateshead on 8 January 2010, moving there on a free transfer. He left Gateshead at the end of the season and signed for Cambridge United on a two-year deal joining the U's for a fee of £10,000 on 1 July 2010. On 5 September 2010, Clare scored his first goal for Cambridge in a 5–0 win against his old team Gateshead. He also had a penalty saved in this game. Clare joined Alfreton Town on loan from Cambridge in February 2011.

Clare signed a one-month loan deal for Gainsborough Trinity on 10 August 2011. He was released by Cambridge United on 22 September 2011. After resigning as Louth Town manager, he signed for United Counties League side Boston Town in November 2013, where he was also part of the coaching team. In May 2016 he re-joined the club as part of the playing squad and as a joint manager with Nathan Collins.

== International career ==
Clare has represented the Republic of Ireland at under-21 and B international level.

== Management career ==
Having seen out the remainder of the 2011–12 season as a free agent following his departure from Cambridge in September 2011, Clare completed his coaching badges with The Football Association and after rejecting offers by other clubs as a player he was appointed manager of Louth Town on 18 June 2012. Clare resigned as manager of Louth Town on 29 October 2013 following several successive defeats for his side this season 2013–14. His next opportunity in management came when he was unveiled as joint boss of Boston Town for the 2016–17 season.

== Personal life ==
Clare was born on Jersey, Channel Islands.

== Honours ==
Grimsby Town

- Football League Second Division play-offs: 1998
- Football League Trophy: 1997–98

Boston United

- Football Conference: 2001–02

Chester City

- Football Conference: 2003–04

Individual

- Grimsby Town Supporters' Young Player of the Year: 1997–98
- Football Conference Golden Boot: 2001–02, 2003–04
- Football Conference Team of the Year: 2002–03
- Football Conference Goalscorer of the Month: November 2002, December 2002, January 2003
- National Game Awards Player of the Year: 2003–04
- Football Conference Player of the Year: 2003–04
