= Aidan Davison =

English-born Northern Irish footballer and coach

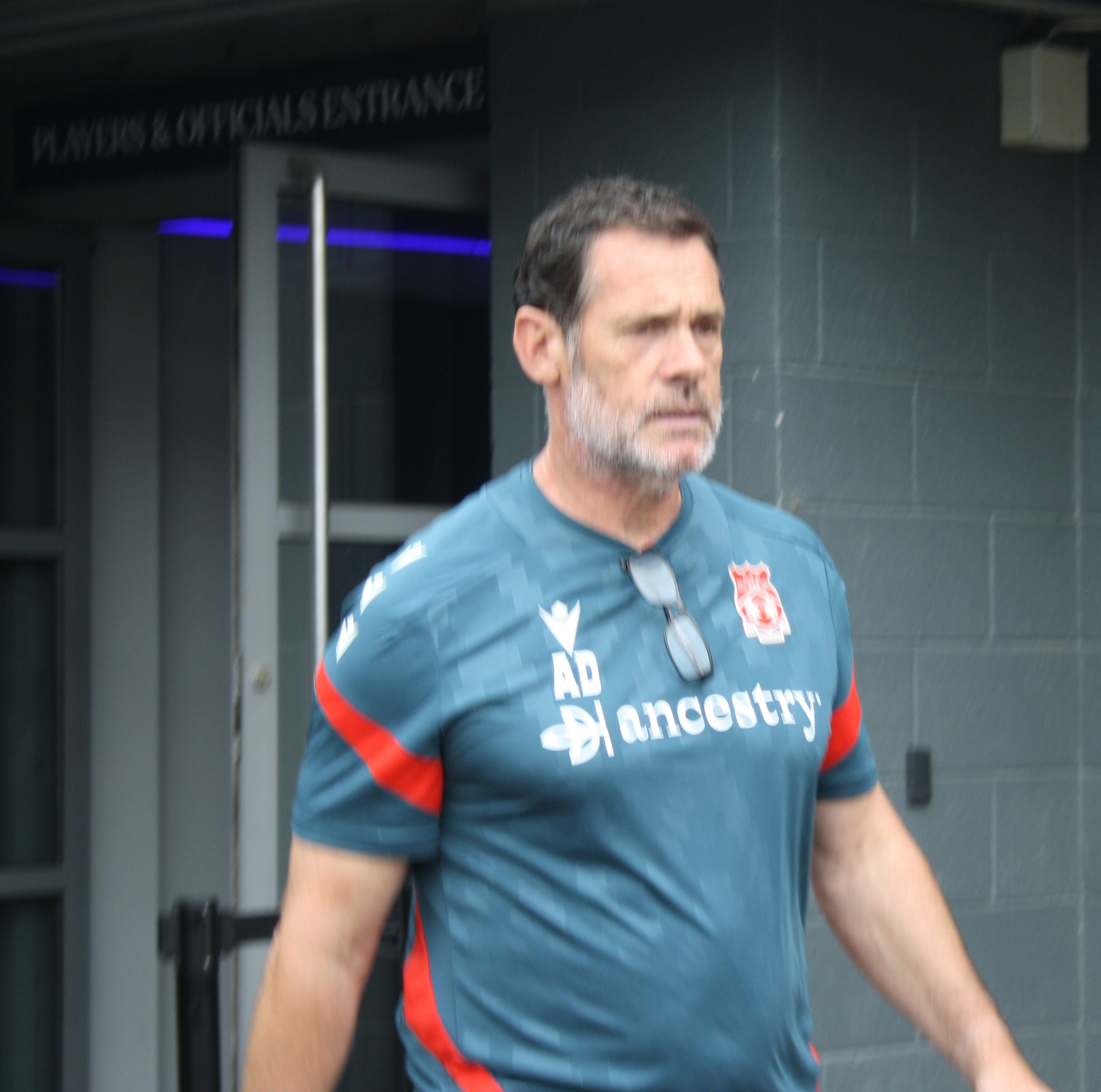
- Aidan Davison in 2025.

Personal information
- Full name: Aidan John Davison
- Date of birth: 11 May 1968 (age 58)
- Place of birth: Sedgefield, England
- Height: 6 ft 1 in (1.85 m)
- Position: Goalkeeper

Team information
- Current team: Wrexham (Goalkeeping coach)

Youth career
- Newcastle United

Senior career*
Years	Team	Apps	(Gls)
1987–1988	Billingham Synthonia	33	(1)
1988–1989	Notts County	1	(0)
1989	→ Leyton Orient (loan)	0	(0)
1989	→ Bury (loan)	0	(0)
1989–1991	Bury	0	(0)
1990	→ Chester City (loan)	0	(0)
1991	→ Blackpool (loan)	0	(0)
1991–1993	Millwall	34	(0)
1993–1997	Bolton Wanderers	37	(0)
1996	→ Ipswich Town (loan)	0	(0)
1996–1997	→ Hull City (loan)	9	(0)
1997	Bradford City	10	(0)
1997–1999	Grimsby Town	76	(0)
1999–2000	Sheffield United	2	(0)
1999–2000	→ Bradford City (loan)	5	(0)
2000–2003	Bradford City	46	(0)
2003–2004	Grimsby Town	32	(0)
2004–2008	Colchester United	99	(0)
2010	Hull City	0	(0)
Total		384	(1)

International career
1996–1997	Northern Ireland	3	(0)
1996	Northern Ireland B	1	(0)

Managerial career
- 2009–2011: Hull City (Reserves)
- 2011–2012: FC JAX Destroyers
- 2015–2017: FC Arizona
- 2017–2018: Sporting Arizona FC
- * Club domestic league appearances and goals

Aidan John Davison (born 11 May 1968) is a football coach and former professional footballer who is goalkeeping coach of Championship side Wrexham.

As a player, he played as a goalkeeper from 1987 until 2008. Having started his career with non-league side Billingham Synthonia, he moved on to Notts County and subsequently spent loan spells with Leyton Orient and Bury before joining the latter on a permanent deal. He went on to play for Chester City, Blackpool and Millwall before earning his biggest break yet by signing for Bolton Wanderers and in 1995 gaining promotion to the Premier League. Loan spells with Ipswich Town and Hull City followed before joining Bradford City permanently. In 1997, he signed for Grimsby Town where he arguably played some of his best football having won promotion and a domestic cup in his two years at the club. He went on to Sheffield United and then returned to Premier League football when he re-joined Bradford City in 2000. In 2003, he returned to Grimsby Town for a year before finishing his career with a four-year spell at Colchester United. In his career, he was capped three times by Northern Ireland.

In 2009 following his retirement he joined the coaching staff of Premier League Hull City and became the club's reserve team manager. In 2010, he briefly came out of retirement and signed as a player to add to the club's goalkeeping cover, however he only made the substitute bench for the reserve team he managed. In 2011, he became head coach of American side FC Jax Destroyers.

== Club career ==
=== Early career ===
Davison was brought up in the North East of England. He played for Newcastle United in their youth team during their successful FA Youth Cup period. He was later released and in 1987 he signed terms with Non-League side Billingham Synthonia where he played 33 times and scored once. It did not take too long for the professional scouts to pick him up and he departed the club midway through the 1987–88 season

In March 1988 Davison moved to Nottingham signing with Notts County who at the time were under the stewardship of John Barnwell and were competing in the Football League Third Division. While at County he made one league appearance and was loaned out too Leyton Orient and then Bury. The Shakers re-signed Davison for a fee of £6,000 in November 1989 following his loan spell in the previous month. Whilst at Gigg Lane, Davison played under Martin Dobson, Sam Ellis and Mike Walsh. Whilst with the club he also spent time out on loan, having spells with both Chester City and Blackpool. Walsh released Davison to Millwall in the summer of 1991, and he became one of Bruce Rioch's new signings at Millwall ahead of the 1991–92 season. Davison played two seasons with Millwall, making 42 appearances in all competitions. He was named as player of the year. He also sustained a collapsed lung during a home game against Derby County which kept him out of action for 12 weeks.

=== Bolton Wanderers ===
In August 1993 Davison followed Bruce Rioch and signed with Bolton Wanderers for £125,000 where he would fight for the number one spot with Keith Branagan. In his second season for The Trotters they earned promotion to the Premier League. Davison made his Premiership debut on 22 November 1995 in a 3–2 defeat at Stamford Bridge against Chelsea. He also played in the home matches against Nottingham Forest, Liverpool, Tottenham Hotspur and Sheffield Wednesday. Wanderers however finished 20th in the league and were relegated. During the 1996–97 season Davison spent time on loan with Hull City and Ipswich Town before departing in March 1997.

=== Bradford City ===
In March 1997 he joined fellow Football League First Division Bradford City on a free transfer. Davison played in 10 matches for the West Yorkshire side but departed Valley Parade at the end 1996–97 season after successfully helping the club retain its championship status.

=== Grimsby Town ===
In the summer of 1997 Davison joined Grimsby Town on a free transfer. The club had recently slipped into the Football League Second Division and manager Alan Buckley had sought after a new number 1 keeper following the departure of Paul Crichton a year before, his replacement Jason Pearcey had failed to live up to expectations and would start the 1997–98 season as Davison's understudy. He made his Town debut on 9 August 1997 in a 1–1 draw with Bristol City. His period at Blundell Park would see him play a part in one of the most successful seasons with Grimsby defeating AFC Bournemouth in the Football League Trophy final at Wembley Stadium and a few weeks later defeating Northampton Town in the Play-Off final also at Wembley. During the 1998–99 season, Steve Croudson became his new understudy as Grimsby cemented themselves 11th spot in the First Division. During his two-year stay he helped the club set a new clean sheet record of 50 in 100 games.

=== Sheffield United ===
Davison departed Blundell Park in the summer of 1999 under the new Bosman ruling signing with Neil Warnock's fellow Championship Division side Sheffield United. His first team opportunities were limited to United's first choice keeper Simon Tracey and would only make two appearances for the Bramall Lane club, a 6–0 hammering by Manchester City and a 3–1 victory over Crystal Palace.

=== Return to Bradford City ===
In January 2000 he cut short his short stay in Sheffield and returned for a second spell at Bradford City who had been promoted to the Premier League in the previous season, initially on loan. He made his second Premiership Bradford City debut on 22 January 2000 in 3–2 victory over Watford. He also played in the following month's 2–1 home victory over Arsenal. His loan deal expired and after some contract wrangling he was able to agree a permanent transfer to Bradford in March 2000, but played only one further match for Bradford that season; a 4–0 defeat to Coventry City. He would only make the bench as City defeated Liverpool on the final day of the season to stay in the England's top flight. During his time at City he would fight for his place with two top keepers in Gary Walsh or Matt Clarke. In the 2000–01 season Davison made three appearances in the UEFA Intertoto Cup with victories over Atlantas Klaipėda and RKC Waalwijk and a defeat against Zenit St. Petersburg. City suffered relegation during that season which meant he spent the next two seasons playing in the Championship Division. His final campaign with The Bantams was the 2002–03 season in which he was also the club's number one keeper.

=== Return to Grimsby Town ===
Davison was convinced to return to Grimsby Town in July 2003 who were now under the stewardship of former Grimsby teammate Paul Groves. Like the first time he had signed with The Mariners they had recently suffered relegation in the previous season from the second tier of English football to the third. This spell with Town however would be a lot less successful as an injury in early 2004 meant his place was contested by his under study Andy Pettinger and Hull City loanee Alan Fettis. Grimsby, without a fit Davison suffered a second successive relegation on the last day of the 2003–04 season. His final game for Grimsby came on 24 February 2004 in a 3–2 win over Luton Town.

=== Colchester United ===
Following Grimsby's relegation in the previous campaign Davison stayed in the newly named Football League One with Colchester United. In his second season with Colchester the club earned promotion to the Football League Championship. He eventually hung his boots up at the end of the 2007–08 season having spent his final season as player coach helping his former understudy Dean Gerken. He played 109 times for United in all competitions. During Davisons time at Colchester Utd the team gained promotion, had a successful FA cup campaign playing Chelsea at Stamford Bridge. He was also a pivotal part of the team which went in a 22-game unbeaten run making Layer Road a tough place to visit.he retired from playing after tearing his left shoulder in a collision against Coventry City in a Championship game. He fought for 6 months to get back to fitness but opted to retire in 2008 after a 21-year pro career. He helped nurture Dean Gerken and Mark Cousins who went on to have successful careers.

== International career ==
=== Northern Ireland ===
Davison made his debut against Sweden on 24 April 1996 and also played against Thailand and Germany. He was selected for over twenty full squads in a 5-year International career including European Championship and World Cup qualifier games. He played under Bryan Hamilton and Lawrie McMenemy.

== Coaching career ==
After being released by Colchester United at the end of the 2007–08 season, he and his wife (Kristine) and kids (Ryan, Kiera, Mia) have acted upon his dream to live in the United States. After which returned as reserve team manager at Hull City A.F.C. In February 2010, he briefly came out of retirement to be named as an unused substitute for Hull City in a friendly match against Galway United, providing goalkeeping back-up for Matt Duke.

On 18 July 2011 it was announced that Davison had been appointed head coach of FC JAX Destroyers. Davison left the club a year later after they disbanded and joined American Soccer school IMG Academy as a coach. In September 2017, Davison took over head coaching duties for Sporting AZ FC from Tim Marchisotto, who became the general manager. He successfully guided Sporting AZ FC through the 2018 US Open Cup qualifying, earning a victory over United Soccer League side Phoenix Rising FC in the second. Davison's amateur-league club finally fell in the third round to USL professional side Fresno.

In 2018, Davison signed for Indian Super League side Pune FC as goalkeeping coach, later holding the same position at rivals Hyderabad FC.

On 25 June 2022, Davison returned to the United Kingdom, signing as a goalkeeping coach for National League side Wrexham.

== Personal life ==
Davison previously resided in Daytona Beach, Florida, United States, and ran his own successful soccer company.

== Honours ==
Bolton Wanderers

- Football League Cup runner-up: 1994–95

Grimsby Town

- Football League Second Division play-offs: 1998
- Football League Trophy: 1997–98

Colchester United

- Football League One second-place promotion: 2005–06
