= Kevin Donovan =

English footballer (born 1971)

Personal information
- Date of birth: 17 December 1971 (age 54)
- Place of birth: Halifax, England
- Height: 5 ft 10 in (1.78 m)
- Position: Midfielder

Youth career
- 1980–1988: Elland Athletic
- 1987–1988: Huddersfield Town

Senior career*
Years	Team	Apps	(Gls)
1988–1992	Huddersfield Town	20	(1)
1992	→ Halifax Town (loan)	6	(0)
1992–1997	West Bromwich Albion	168	(19)
1997–2001	Grimsby Town	154	(23)
2001–2003	Barnsley	54	(1)
2003–2004	Rochdale	7	(0)
2004–2006	York City	31	(2)
2006–2007	Alfreton Town		
Total		440	(46)
- * Club domestic league appearances and goals

Kevin Donovan (born 17 December 1971) is an English football coach, former professional player and sports co-commentator. He runs his own football academy that is linked to Brighouse Town.

As a player, he was a midfielder from 1988 to 2007 with lengthy spells at West Bromwich Albion and Grimsby Town which saw him win two play-off finals at Wembley Stadium. He also played in the Football League for Huddersfield Town, Halifax Town, Barnsley and Rochdale before finishing his career off in non-League football with York City and Alfreton Town.

== Playing career ==
Donovan started playing for Elland Athletic in the Halifax league as an 8-year old before he joined Huddersfield Town, training at the centre of excellence, at 16 he became an apprentice and turned professional in October 1989. He joined Halifax Town on loan during February and March 1992, before moving to West Bromwich Albion for £70,000 in October of that year. He made his Albion debut against Port Vale in the same month. Donovan scored in Albion's 3–0 win over Vale in the Division Two play-off final the following May at Wembley as the club clinched promotion.

In July 1997 he signed for Grimsby Town for a £300,000 fee, joining up with his former manager at Albion, Alan Buckley. His time at Grimsby was arguably the best of his career. In his first season, he scored 21 goals to help the club win twice at Wembley Stadium in the Football League Trophy, and in the play-off final, in which Donovan netted the only goal of the game. However, Donovan failed to score a single goal in the following season for the club.

Two more rather impressive seasons were spent at Blundell Park before Donovan confirmed the Grimsby supporters' worst fears and left to join rivals Barnsley. His time at Oakwell was mainly blighted by injury problems, and he experienced relegation with the club, and at the end of the 2002–03 season he was released by The Tykes. During his spell at Barnsley he scored once against Walsall in December 2001.

Donovan was snapped up by Alan Buckley, who had managed him at West Brom and Grimsby, and gave him a one-year deal for Rochdale However, after another fruitless campaign, playing only seven times for 'Dale, Donovan was released by the club.

His next port of call was at Conference club York City on a one-year contract, following a loan spell. At York he linked up with former Grimsby teammate Paul Groves, but neither really flourished. At the end of the season Donovan moved into the Conference North, joining Alfreton Town for a season before retiring from the game.

== Personal life ==
Donovan runs a football school and coaches the junior side at Brighouse Town.

He occasionally co-commentates for BBC Radio Humberside on Grimsby Town games.

== Honours ==
West Bromwich Albion

- Football League Second Division play-offs: 1993

Grimsby Town

- Football League Second Division play-offs: 1998
- Football League Trophy: 1997–98

Individual

- PFA Team of the Year: 1997–98 Second Division
- Grimsby Town Supporters' Player of the Year: 1997–98
