= Wayne Burnett =

English football coach and former player

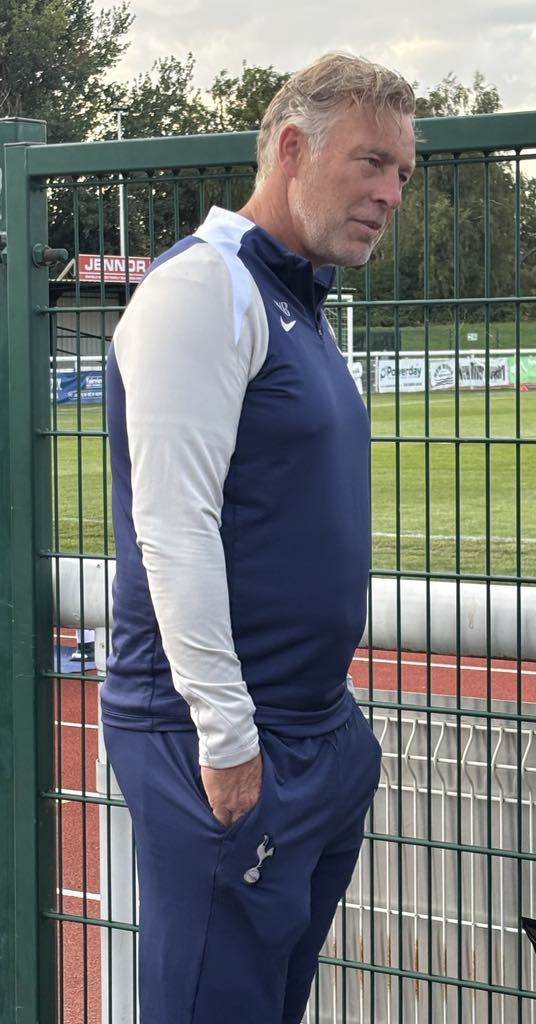
- Wayne Burnett in 2025

Personal information
- Full name: Wayne Burnett
- Date of birth: 4 September 1971 (age 55)
- Place of birth: Lambeth, England
- Height: 5 ft 11 in (1.80 m)
- Position: Midfielder

Team information
- Current team: Tottenham Hotspur (U21s head coach)

Youth career
- Leyton Orient

Senior career*
Years	Team	Apps	(Gls)
1989–1992	Leyton Orient	40	(4)
1992–1993	Blackburn Rovers	3	(0)
1993–1995	Plymouth Argyle	70	(3)
1995–1996	Bolton Wanderers	3	(0)
1996	→ Huddersfield Town (loan)	3	(0)
1996–1998	Huddersfield Town	102	(4)
1998	→ Grimsby Town (loan)	0	(0)
1998–2002	Grimsby Town	103	(5)
2002	Woking	3	(0)
2002–2003	Grays Athletic		
2003	Fisher Athletic		
2004	Peterborough United	0	(0)
Total		327	(16)

Managerial career
- 2004–2005: Fisher Athletic
- 2006–2007: Dulwich Hamlet
- 2007–2008: Fisher Athletic
- 2008–2009: Grays Athletic
- 2013–2015: Dagenham & Redbridge
- * Club domestic league appearances and goals

Wayne Burnett (born 4 September 1971) is an English football coach and former footballer who is head coach of Tottenham Hotspur's under-21 team.

As a player Burnett was a midfielder from 1989 until 2004, playing in the Football League for Plymouth Argyle, Huddersfield Town and Grimsby Town. Whilst at Grimsby he scored the winning golden goal in the 1998 Football League Trophy final. He also briefly played Premier League football for Blackburn Rovers and also played in the Football League for Leyton Orient, Bolton Wanderers and Peterborough United as well as playing non-League football for Woking, Grays Athletic and Fisher Athletic. After retiring from football in 2004, Burnett went on to become manager with former clubs Grays and Fisher as well as a spell with Dulwich Hamlet before returning to Leyton Orient as youth team manager.

== Playing career ==
Burnett was born in Lambeth, London and started out playing for Leyton Orient as a youngster, and represented England at youth level. He soon earned himself a move to Blackburn Rovers, becoming one of Kenny Dalglish's first signings but after a year with the Rovers he was transferred to Plymouth Argyle in 1993.

In 1995 Premiership newcomers Bolton Wanderers signed Burnett. But after only a season with the club he was sold to Huddersfield Town following a short loan spell. His time in Yorkshire was a rather mixed one. He alternated between a deep-lying creative midfield role and that of a libero-style sweeper. Described as a flair player with much skill, he scored a wonder goal against Bradford City from just inside his own half in a League Cup tie, which proved to be his only goal for Huddersfield. At the time of his goal, the tie was balanced at 2–2 on aggregate. Burnett's goal in the 77th minute put Huddersfield through to the next round.

Following a clear out at Huddersfield, Burnett was loaned to Grimsby Town in 1998 and scored in his debut against Scunthorpe United as the Mariners put their local rivals out of the Football League Trophy.

It was in the same competition at Wembley Stadium against AFC Bournemouth that Burnett scored the winning golden goal in the 1998 final and played in the promotion winning team in the play-off final a month later. Burnett helped the Mariners to an impressive finish in the Championship, almost securing a play-off spot to the Premiership the following season.

He stayed with Grimsby until the summer of 2002, but was troubled by a persistent injury problem that made him miss chunks of the 1999–2000, 2000–01 and 2001–02 seasons. Burnett was released by manager Paul Groves with the player sidelined for the majority of his time in his last season.

Burnett dropped out of professional football and signed with Conference National club Woking, but his time at his new club was short lived after a spat with the club's supporters. The incident happened in a Conference game in which Woking were trailing 2–0 with 20 minutes remaining. Burnett was brought on as a substitute but could not change the outcome of the game. In a statement made to the Grimsby Telegraph, Burnett claimed that Woking supporters had singled him out for abuse, stating that they expected him to come on and win the game for them because he was a professional footballer. Burnett claimed that just because he is a professional does not mean he can change the outcome of every game.

He then joined Grays Athletic and Fisher Athletic for a short period of time before appearing to retire from the sport.

In 2004 Burnett made a return to the professional game signing for Peterborough United on a non-contract basis. He did not make any appearances for the club before leaving.

== Managerial career ==
Burnett started his managerial career with Fisher Athletic in 2004, winning the London Senior Cup and Southern Football League Eastern Division. He then joined Dulwich Hamlet in 2006. He was appointed manager of Fisher Athletic for the second time in May 2007. On 23 September 2008, it was announced that Burnett would join Conference side Grays Athletic as manager on 29 September. He left the club by mutual consent on 29 January 2009. Burnett briefly worked as the youth team manager at former club Leyton Orient before it was confirmed on 7 May 2009 that Burnett would take up the position of assistant manager to John Still at League Two club Dagenham & Redbridge for the forthcoming 2009–10 season. On 26 February 2013 Burnett was appointed caretaker manager following Still's departure to Luton Town. On 2 May 2013, following Dagenham & Redbridge's survival in League Two, Burnett was appointed permanent manager. After winning just one game from 16 played in the 2015–16 season, Burnett was sacked by Dagenham on 21 December 2015.

On 29 June 2017, Burnett was appointed head coach of Tottenham Hotspur's under-23 team (now the under-21 team following changes to the Premier League 2).

== Television work ==
During the 2003–04 season Burnett went into acting appearing as an extra for Sky One football television drama Dream Team. Burnett can be seen in a number of episodes appearing to be sat on the substitutes bench also training with the fictional Harchester United team.

=== Filmography ===
Television	Year	Role
Dream Team	2003–2004	As himself (uncredited)

== Managerial statistics ==
As of 31 December 2021

Managerial record by team and tenure
Team	From	To	Record				
Team	From	To	P	W	D	L	Win %
Grays Athletic	29 September 2008	29 January 2009	23	8	5	10	34.78
Dagenham & Redbridge	26 February 2013	21 December 2015	143	42	38	63	29.37
Tottenham Hotspur F.C. Under-21s	September 2017	Present	114	43	23	48	37.72
Total			280	93	66	121	33.21

== Honours ==
=== Player ===
Grimsby Town

- Football League Second Division play-offs: 1998
- Football League Trophy: 1997–98

=== Manager ===
Fisher Athletic

- Southern Football League Eastern Division: 2004–05
- London Senior Cup: 2005–06
