= Kevin Jobling =

English footballer

Personal information
- Date of birth: 1 January 1968 (age 58)
- Place of birth: Sunderland, England
- Height: 5 ft 9 in (1.75 m)
- Positions: Left back; midfielder

Youth career
- Leicester City

Senior career*
Years	Team	Apps	(Gls)
1986–1987	Leicester City	9	(0)
1987–1998	Grimsby Town	285	(10)
1998–2000	Shrewsbury Town	69	(3)
2000–2002	Telford United		
- * Club domestic league appearances and goals

Kevin Jobling (born 1 January 1968) is an English former professional footballer who played in the Football League for Leicester City, Grimsby Town and Shrewsbury Town, and in non-league football for Telford United.

== Honours ==
Grimsby Town

- Football League Trophy: 1997–98
