= Paul Groves (footballer) =

English footballer and manager

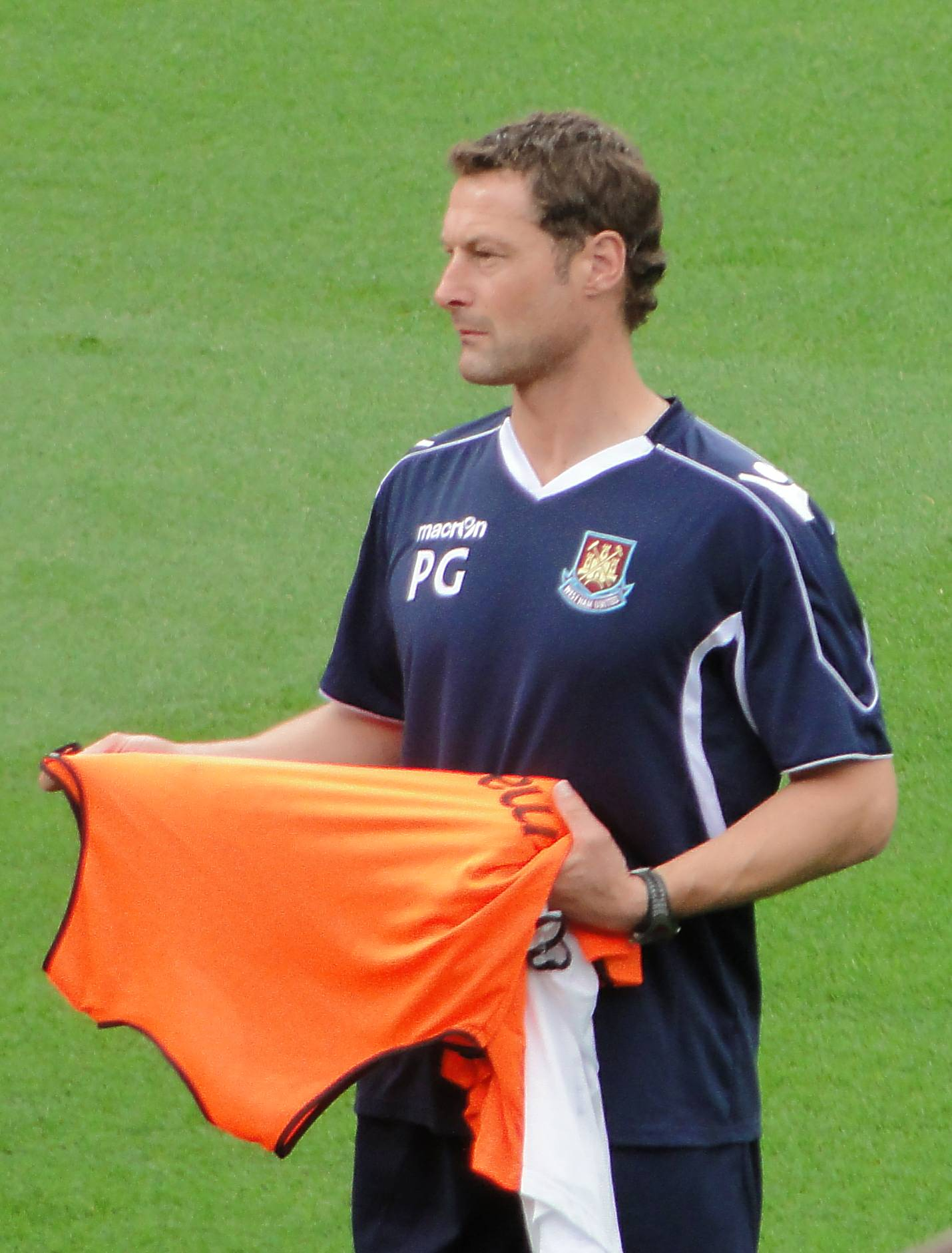
- Groves at West Ham United, August 2010

Personal information
- Full name: Paul Groves
- Date of birth: 28 February 1966 (age 60)
- Place of birth: Derby, England
- Height: 5 ft 11 in (1.80 m)
- Positions: Defender; midfielder

Senior career*
Years	Team	Apps	(Gls)
- Belper Town
198?–1988	Burton Albion		
1988–1990	Leicester City	16	(1)
1989	→ Lincoln City (loan)	8	(1)
1990–1992	Blackpool	107	(21)
1992–1996	Grimsby Town	184	(38)
1996–1997	West Bromwich Albion	29	(4)
1997–2004	Grimsby Town	270	(33)
2004	→ Scunthorpe United (loan)	7	(2)
2004	Scunthorpe United	6	(1)
2004–2005	York City	42	(3)
2005–2006	Stafford Rangers	30	(5)
Total		699	(109)

Managerial career
- 2001–2004: Grimsby Town
- 2009: Portsmouth (caretaker)
- 2012: AFC Bournemouth
- 2020–2021: Gloucester City
- * Club domestic league appearances and goals

Paul Groves (born 28 February 1966) is an English football coach and former professional footballer.

He notably captained and managed Grimsby Town. He was naturally a central midfield player, but later in his career was used as a central defender. He also played in the Football League for Leicester City, Lincoln City, Blackpool, West Bromwich Albion and Scunthorpe United having also played at non-league level for Belper Town, Burton Albion, York City and Stafford Rangers. His playing career lasted from 1986 until 2006. He was player/manager at Grimsby Town from 2001 until 2004, he eventually retired in 2006 whilst he was player/assistant manager at Stafford Rangers.

After moving into coaching full time he became a first team coach at West Ham United following Avram Grant to the club from Portsmouth. However, he parted company with the club on 24 June 2011, following the arrival of Sam Allardyce he joined AFC Bournemouth as the club's youth team manager. On 25 March 2012 he became the club's first team manager following a caretaker spell in charge, however he was relieved of his duties in October that year but was re-appointed as youth team boss. He has also held coaching staff roles at Bristol City, Crawley Town, Mickleover Sports, Birmingham City, Chennaiyin FC and Maccabi Haifa. He became first team manager of Gloucester City in 2020 but was dismissed in 2021 and returned to India as assistant manager of NorthEast United.

== Playing career ==
=== Burton Albion ===
Born in Derby, Derbyshire, Groves began his career in non-League football, playing for Belper Town before joining Burton Albion in 1987 for whom he appeared at Wembley Stadium for in the 1987 FA Trophy Final.

=== Leicester City ===
In April 1988 he moved to Leicester City for £12,000. He made 19 appearances for the Foxes, scoring two goals. In August 1989 he was loaned out to Lincoln City, playing eight league games and scoring once. Having not made the grade at Filbert Street, Leicester placed Groves on the transfer list and he eventually left the club in January 1990.

=== Blackpool ===
Groves signed for Blackpool on a permanent £60,000 deal. He became a regular in the side, making a total of 135 appearances and scoring 29 goals between 1990 and 1992.

=== Grimsby Town ===
In August 1992 Groves signed for Grimsby Town for £150,000 who at the time were managed by Alan Buckley. Groves became very consistent as a player at Grimsby and was a first team regular who regularly scored goals from midfield, in addition to being a good tackler. His goals enabled him to top the club's scoring chart in his first season at the club 1992–93, with 12 goals in 46 matches. He also topped the chart again in the 1995–96 . He played every league game in his first (four-season) spell and in his first three seasons. Groves became part of a nostalgic playing squad that harboured such professionals as Ivano Bonetti, Steve Livingstone, John McDermott and Gary Croft. Whilst at the club Groves also played under Brian Laws, and caretaker manager John Cockerill

=== West Bromwich Albion ===
His next port of call was to join West Bromwich Albion for £600,000 in 1996 where he was signed once again by Alan Buckley. After one season with Albion, Buckley had moved back to Grimsby taking Groves with him for £250,000 as well as Kevin Donovan amongst others. Groves would be part of a selection of players who transferred between West Brom and Grimsby in the late to mid nineties through the Alan Buckley connection. Whilst with the club he played 33 times in all competitions scoring four goals.

=== Return to Grimsby Town ===
Groves returned to Grimsby for the start of the 1997–98 season where he soon became captain. During his time at Grimsby, the club spent all but the 1997–98 season in the First Division. This was the successful play-off promotion and Football League Trophy-winning season, in which Groves captained Grimsby to two Wembley Stadium wins (the third of his career) in the space of three weeks and started all 68 games that season. In addition to league success, there were several cup runs in which Grimsby beat FA Premier League opposition including West Ham United, Leicester City, Sheffield Wednesday and Liverpool.

On the last day of the 2000–01 season, Groves scored a 25-yard goal in the 26th minute to win 1–0 over promoted Fulham, which secured their place in Division One. Following the sacking of Lennie Lawrence in December 2001, Groves was appointed player-manager. He was sacked in 2004 but despite being relinquished of his managerial duties, Groves remained on as a player until he was jettisoned by the club's incoming new manager.

=== Scunthorpe United ===
Groves joined Scunthorpe United on a one-month loan on 27 February 2004 following the appointment of Nicky Law at Grimsby. Whilst there he scored the 100th league goal of his career, scoring twice in a 3–1 win at York City. He was described as "inspirational" by Scunthorpe manager Brian Laws. He signed for Scunthorpe on a permanent contract until the end of the 2003–04 season on 30 March after reaching a settlement on the remainder of his Grimsby contract.

=== York City ===
Groves signed a one-year contract with York City, who had recently been relegated to the Conference National, in June 2004 along with former Grimsby teammate Kevin Donovan. After one season with York, Groves left the club.

=== Stafford Rangers ===
In the summer of 2005, he was appointed player-assistant manager when he signed for Conference North side Stafford Rangers. He brought his 19-year playing career to a close in May 2006 after helping them to promotion to the Conference National after making 32 appearances and scoring five goals in the 2005–06 season.

== Management and coaching career ==
=== Grimsby Town ===
Groves who at the time was the club captain at Grimsby Town was installed as the player/caretaker manager at the club following the sacking of Lennie Lawrence and long serving assistant manager John Cockerill. A week later in December 2001 he was installed as full-time player-manager of Grimsby. At the time of his appointment the club were and had been in the second tier of English football since 1998 and were heading into a third successive relegation battle despite the fact the club had briefly topped the table in September. He brought back former player Graham Rodger as his assistant and bolstered his side with several good loan signings, including Charlton Athletic duo Andy Todd and Martin Pringle. Groves managed to steer the club to safety and secured Town's place within what is now the Football League Championship for another year. The 2002–03 season was not as successful: the club was eventually relegated. A poor start to the 2003–04 season saw Groves sacked from his managerial duties in February 2004 but remarkably he was kept on as a player until the end of the season but found himself farmed out to local rivals Scunthorpe United on loan by his replacement Nicky Law. He left Grimsby during the summer of 2004 and signed for York City as a player.

=== Portsmouth ===
In July 2006, he joined the coaching staff at Portsmouth under Harry Redknapp. He was appointed as caretaker manager at Portsmouth alongside Ian Woan on 24 November 2009 after Paul Hart left the club, before the appointment of Avram Grant two days later on 26 November. He remained at Pompey under Grant.

=== West Ham United ===
In July 2010, Groves joined West Ham United as senior coach working under manager Avram Grant having previously worked under him at Portsmouth, but he parted company with the club on 24 June 2011 weeks after the dismissal of Avram Grant.

=== AFC Bournemouth ===
Groves became youth team manager of AFC Bournemouth in July 2011. On 25 March 2012, following the dismissal of Lee Bradbury, he became joint-caretaker manager of Bournemouth with head of youth Shaun Brooks, until the end of the 2011–12 season. In May 2012, despite having won only two of his eight games as caretaker manager, Groves was appointed as manager on a permanent basis, to the upset of a number of fans, who had called for an experienced candidate. Groves and assistant Shaun Brooks parted company with Bournemouth on 3 October 2012 after only one win in the new season. Two weeks later both Groves and Brooks were re-appointed to their previous roles at the club with Groves once again becoming youth team manager. He left Bournemouth in January 2014.

=== Other positions ===
In June 2014, Groves joined Crawley Town as a first-team coach. Groves left Crawley in May 2015. In July 2015, he was appointed Academy manager at Bristol City. In March 2017 he joined Northern Premier League side Mickleover Sports as Assistant Manager. On 20 April 2017 new Birmingham City manager Harry Redknapp appointed Groves as first-team coach, reuniting the pair whom had worked together at Portsmouth. He remained with the club under Redknapp's successor, Steve Cotterill, but left when Cotterill was sacked in March 2018 with the team in the relegation zone.

On 9 July he was named as John Gregory's assistant for Indian Super League side Chennaiyin FC. In June 2019, he was appointed assistant manager at Maccabi Haifa, remaining in the position until he accepted the manager's role at Gloucester.

=== Gloucester City ===
On 8 December 2020, Groves joined National League North side Gloucester City as first team manager. The 2020–21 season was cancelled due to the COVID-19 pandemic on 18 February 2021, at the time Gloucester were top of the league and were five points clear after eighteen games, the cancellation meant that Gloucester would not be able to carry the season on in hope of promotion.

On 25 September 2021, following a 3–0 defeat to Gateshead, Groves was sacked by the club.

=== Return to coaching ===
Following his departure from Gloucester, Groves returned to Mickleover as a first team coach.

In August 2022, Groves moved to Indian Super League club NorthEast United as an assistant to Israeli head coach Marco Balbul. In October 2025, he made a fresh return to the coaching staff at Mickleover.

== Managerial statistics ==
As of match played 25 September 2021

Managerial record by team and tenure
Team	From	To	Record					Ref
Team	From	To	P	W	D	L	Win %	Ref
Grimsby Town	28 December 2001	9 February 2004	103	24	31	48	23.3	
Portsmouth (caretaker)	24 November 2009	26 November 2009	0	0	0	0	—	
AFC Bournemouth	25 March 2012	3 October 2012	20	3	11	6	15.0	
Gloucester City	8 December 2020	25 September 2021	17	7	3	7	41.2	
Total			140	34	45	61	24.3	—

== Honours ==
Blackpool

- Football League Fourth Division play-offs: 1992

Grimsby Town

- Football League Second Division play-offs: 1998
- Football League Trophy: 1997–98

Stafford Rangers

- Conference North: 2005–06

Individual

- PFA Team of the Year: 1991–92 Fourth Division, 1997–98 Second Division
- Grimsby Town Player of the Year: 1998–99
