= Alan Buckley =

English footballer & manager (born 1951)

Personal information
- Full name: Alan Peter Buckley
- Date of birth: 20 April 1951 (age 75)
- Place of birth: Mansfield, England
- Height: 5 ft 6 in (1.68 m)
- Position: Forward

Senior career*
Years	Team	Apps	(Gls)
1967–1973	Nottingham Forest	18	(1)
1973–1978	Walsall	241	(125)
1978–1979	Birmingham City	28	(8)
1979–1984	Walsall	178	(49)
1984–1986	Stourbridge		
1986–1987	Tamworth	3	(0)
Total		440	(183)

Managerial career
- 1978: Walsall (caretaker)
- 1979–1981: Walsall
- 1981–1982: Walsall (joint with Neil Martin)
- 1982–1986: Walsall
- 1986–1988: Kettering Town
- 1988–1994: Grimsby Town
- 1994–1997: West Bromwich Albion
- 1997–2000: Grimsby Town
- 2001–2002: Lincoln City
- 2003: Rochdale
- 2006–2008: Grimsby Town
- 2012–2013: Grimsby Town (U17s)
- * Club domestic league appearances and goals

Alan Peter Buckley (born 20 April 1951) is an English former professional footballer and football manager who now works as a sports co-commentator for BBC Humberside.

As a player, he was a forward from 1967 to 1987 for Nottingham Forest, Walsall, Birmingham City, Stourbridge and Tamworth. He moved into management and has been in charge of Walsall, Kettering Town, West Bromwich Albion, Lincoln City and Rochdale. He gained renown for his three stints as manager of Grimsby Town between 1988 and 2008, where his achievements have made him the club's most successful manager. Buckley is one of only 14 managers to have reached 1,000 matches in charge of a league club, but the only one of the 14 never to have managed a team in the Premiership or its predecessor, the First Division.

== Playing career ==
Buckley began his career with Nottingham Forest, but was transferred to Walsall in 1973 having never managed to win a regular place in the first team. He became a prolific striker at Fellows Park, before he was transferred briefly to Birmingham City in October 1978. He returned to Walsall as their record signing (£175,000) in June 1979. He began his managerial career with 'The Saddlers', initially as player/manager and briefly as co-manager with Neil Martin. This was an era that became a hallmark for some of the most attractive football seen in Walsall and the side gradually established itself as promotion contenders.

Buckley gained a favourable reputation during his time in the Black Country, scoring against Manchester United as a player during an FA Cup upset in January 1975, and leading his Walsall side as a manager to victories against the likes of Arsenal, and a draw at Anfield during a League Cup run which took them to the semi-finals, just '90 Minutes From Europe'. He was sacked in August 1986, when Terry Ramsden bought the club, installing his own managerial team within 90 minutes of the takeover deal being completed.

Alan Buckley is still regarded very highly at Walsall; promotion in his first season as manager and in 1984 taking the European Champions Liverpool all the way in a League Cup semi final after drawing at Anfield 2-2. Walsall were the better team but poor finishing and bad luck at home meant Liverpool won 2–0 with their only shots after which Graeme Souness said he would rather play against Juventus than Walsall as they totally "outplayed us" at times after the match.

He joined Tamworth as a player in October 1986, playing a total of five games for the club, three in the West Midlands Premier League, with a debut in the 2–0 victory at Tividale on 4 October 1986.

== Management career ==
Later as a manager, after a spell with non-league Kettering Town, he guided Grimsby Town to promotion from the Fourth Division in 1990 and they reached the Second Division a year later – where they spent all but one of the next 12 seasons. In his first two spells at the club, Buckley's Grimsby sides were renowned for their attractive passing game and mounted periodic challenges for the play-offs. Buckley remained at Blundell Park until the autumn of 1994 when he joined Grimsby's Division One rivals West Bromwich Albion. His spell at the Hawthorns lasted two and a half years before he was sacked for failing to get Albion anywhere near a promotion challenge.

A few months after being sacked by Albion, Buckley returned to Grimsby in summer 1997 for his second spell as manager. Town had just been relegated to Division Two, but he took them back to Division One at the first time of asking with two Wembley visits in 1998. Buckley remained in charge for two full seasons after that, but was dismissed after just two games of 2000–01. A couple of brief, short-lived spells in Division Three followed – first with Lincoln City, arriving at Sincil Bank in January 2001. Buckley left the Imps in April 2002, with the club stating that financial reasons were behind his departure. He then took charge of Rochdale in June 2003, but left by mutual consent in December of the same year after failing to revive the club's fortunes. On 9 November 2006 Buckley was appointed manager of Grimsby for a third time.

In his first season back with Grimsby, a mid-table finish was considered a creditable achievement after relegation from the Football League had looked a distinct possibility. In 2007–08, Grimsby made a slow start but soon picked up. A good run in the Football League Trophy saw The Mariners travel to the new Wembley 10 years after their first visit. However this time Grimsby lost 0–2 to MK Dons. League form suffered terribly afterwards, the season ending with eight straight defeats. After gaining just two points from the opening six games of the 2008–09 season, Buckley was again dismissed as manager.

In his three stints as Grimsby Town manager—spanning, in total, over 10 years—the club was never relegated and he also guided them to three promotions. Only 14 managers have reached 1,000 matches in charge of a Football League team by 1998 and Buckley is one of them.

On 14 June 2012 Buckley returned to Grimsby for a fourth time by joining the coaching staff as the new U17 team manager.

== Personal life ==
His younger brother Steve played over 300 games as a full-back for Derby County, and well over 100 for Luton Town. His eldest son Simon was contracted to both West Bromwich Albion and Grimsby Town without playing but later played at non-league level for Boston United. His other son Adam did however make just under 50 Football League appearances combined for both Grimsby Town and Lincoln City before going on to feature for a number of clubs at a semi-professional level.

Buckley's grandson Brandon has also played for Grimsby Town.

== Media career ==
Since his departure from management with Grimsby in 2008, Buckley who continues to live in the area is often the co-commentator and guest pundit for BBC Radio Humberside's coverage of Grimsby Town games. He has continued to work in this role alongside his current management duties of the club's U17 side.

== Managerial statistics ==
As of 24 May 2007.

Team	From	To	Record				
Team	From	To	G	W	L	D	Win %
Walsall	27 June 1979	1 July 1981	93	36	24	33	38.71
Walsall	1 July 1981	1 January 1982	18	9	4	5	50.00
Walsall	1 July 1982	1 August 1986	201	87	66	48	43.28
Grimsby Town	6 June 1988	20 October 1994	327	130	109	88	39.76
West Bromwich Albion	20 October 1994	22 January 1997	118	39	45	34	33.05
Grimsby Town	21 May 1997	22 August 2000	175	67	63	45	38.29
Lincoln City	28 February 2001	25 April 2002	69	16	29	24	23.19
Rochdale	1 June 2003	30 December 2003	28	8	15	5	28.57
Grimsby Town	9 November 2006	15 September 2008	97	33	41	23	34.02
Total			1,126	425	396	305	37.74

== Honours ==
=== As a player ===
Walsall

- Football League Fourth Division runner-up: 1979–80

=== As a manager ===
Kettering Town

- GMAC Cup: 1987

Grimsby Town

- Football League Third Division third-place promotion: 1990–91
- Football League Second Division play-offs: 1998
- Football League Fourth Division second-place promotion: 1989–90
- Football League Trophy: 1997–98; runner-up: 2007–08

== See also ==
- List of football managers with the most matches
