= 1995–96 Derby County F.C. season =

Derby County
1995–96 season
- Chairman: Lionel Pickering
- Manager: Jim Smith
- Stadium: Baseball Ground
- Football League First Division: 2nd (promoted)
- FA Cup: Third round
- Coca-Cola Cup: Third round
- Top goalscorer: Sturridge (20)
- Highest home attendance: 17,460 vs. Wolverhampton Wanderers (10 February 1996)
- Lowest home attendance: 9,242 vs. Southend United (13 September 1995)
- Average home league attendance: 14,327

During the 1995–96 English football season, Derby County F.C. competed in the Football League First Division.

== Season summary ==
Jim Smith became the new manager of Derby County in the summer, replacing former boss Roy McFarland. Although the new season started slowly, the signing of sweeper Igor Štimac in the early autumn proved pivotal. Throwing his brief of "a top-half finish" out the window, Smith guided the Rams to a second-place finish and promotion to the Premier League.

== Final league table ==
Pos	Team	Pld	W	D	L	GF	GA	GD	Pts	Qualification or relegation
1	Sunderland (C, P)	46	22	17	7	59	33	+26	83	Promotion to the Premier League
2	Derby County (P)	46	21	16	9	71	51	+20	79	Promotion to the Premier League
3	Crystal Palace	46	20	15	11	67	48	+19	75	Qualification for the First Division play-offs
4	Stoke City	46	20	13	13	60	49	+11	73	Qualification for the First Division play-offs
5	Leicester City (O, P)	46	19	14	13	66	60	+6	71	Qualification for the First Division play-offs

Rules for classification: 1) Points; 2) Goals scored; 3) Goal difference
(C) Champions; (O) Play-off winners; (P) Promoted

== Results ==
Derby County's score comes first

=== Legend ===
Win	Draw	Loss

=== Results per matchday ===
Matchday	1	2	3	4	5	6	7	8	9	10	11	12	13	14	15	16	17	18	19	20	21	22	23	24	25	26	27	28	29	30	31	32	33	34	35	36	37	38	39	40	41	42	43	44	45	46
Ground	H	A	H	A	A	H	H	A	A	H	A	H	A	H	A	H	H	A	A	H	H	A	H	A	H	H	A	A	H	A	H	H	A	A	H	A	H	A	H	A	A	H	A	H	H	A
Result	D	L	D	L	W	L	W	D	L	D	W	D	D	W	L	W	W	W	D	W	W	W	W	W	W	W	D	D	D	W	D	W	D	D	W	L	D	L	W	L	W	W	D	D	W	L
Position	14	20	21	23	20	21	19	17	21	20	17	18	18	14	18	14	10	8	10	9	3	2	1	1	1	1	1	1	1	1	1	1	1	1	1	2	2	2	2	2	2	2	2	2	2	2

Source: WorldFootball.com
A = Away; H = Home; W = Win; D = Draw; L = Loss

Date	Opponent	Venue	Result	Attendance	Scorers
13 August 1995	Port Vale	H	0–0	10,869	
19 August 1995	Reading	A	2–3	9,280	Preece, Sturridge
26 August 1995	Grimsby Town	H	1–1	10,564	Sturridge
30 August 1995	Wolverhampton Wanderers	A	0–3	15,170	
2 September 1995	Luton Town	A	2–1	6,427	Sturridge (2)
10 September 1995	Leicester City	H	0–1	11,767	
13 September 1995	Southend United	H	1–0	9,242	Sturridge
16 September 1995	Portsmouth	A	2–2	14,434	Flynn, van der Lann
23 September 1995	Barnsley	A	0–2	8,929	
1 October 1995	Millwall	H	2–2	9,590	Willems, van der Lann
7 October 1995	Sheffield United	A	2–0	12,721	Gabbiadini, Willems
14 October 1995	Ipswich Town	H	1–1	13,034	Gabbiadini
22 October 1995	Stoke City	A	1–1	9,435	van der Lann
28 October 1995	Oldham Athletic	H	2–1	11,545	van der Lann, Simpson
4 November 1995	Tranmere Rovers	A	1–5	8,565	Štimac
11 November 1995	West Bromwich Albion	H	3–0	13,765	Gabbiadini (2), Sturridge (pen)
18 November 1995	Charlton Athletic	H	2–0	12,963	Willems, Gabbiadini
21 November 1995	Birmingham City	A	4–1	19,417	Sturridge, Willems, D Powell, Gabbiadini
25 November 1995	Crystal Palace	A	0–0	13,506	
2 December 1995	Sheffield United	H	4–2	13,841	Willems (2, 1 pen), Sturridge, Gabbiadini
9 December 1995	Barnsley	H	4–1	14,415	Gabbiadini, Carsley, Sturridge, Willems (pen)
16 December 1995	Millwall	A	1–0	7,694	Sturridge
23 December 1995	Sunderland	H	3–1	16,882	Gabbiadini, Willems (pen), Sturridge
26 December 1995	Huddersfield Town	A	1–0	17,878	Willems
1 January 1996	Norwich City	H	2–1	16,714	Willems, Gabbiadini
13 January 1996	Reading	H	3–0	15,123	Sturridge (2), Flynn
20 January 1996	Port Vale	A	1–1	11,947	Sturridge
3 February 1996	Grimsby Town	A	1–1	7,818	D Powell
10 February 1996	Wolverhampton Wanderers	H	0–0	17,460	
17 February 1996	Southend United	A	2–1	8,331	Simpson, Willems
21 February 1996	Luton Town	H	1–1	14,825	D Powell
24 February 1996	Portsmouth	H	3–2	16,120	Sturridge, Yates, Gabbiadini
28 February 1996	Leicester City	A	0–0	20,911	
2 March 1996	Huddersfield Town	H	3–2	17,097	Simpson (2), van der Lann
5 March 1996	Watford	A	0–0	8,306	
9 March 1996	Sunderland	A	0–3	21,644	
16 March 1996	Watford	H	1–1	15,939	Simpson (pen)
23 March 1996	Norwich City	A	0–1	15,349	
30 March 1996	Stoke City	H	3–1	17,245	Sturridge (2), D Powell
2 April 1996	Ipswich Town	A	0–1	16,210	
6 April 1996	Oldham Athletic	A	1–0	8,119	Simpson (pen)
8 April 1996	Tranmere Rovers	H	6–2	16,723	Yates, Simpson (3), D Powell, Sturridge
14 April 1996	Charlton Athletic	A	0–0	11,334	
20 April 1996	Birmingham City	H	1–1	16,757	Simpson
28 April 1996	Crystal Palace	H	2–1	17,041	Sturridge, van der Lann
5 May 1996	West Bromwich Albion	A	2–3	23,858	Ward, Sturridge

=== FA Cup ===
Round	Date	Opponent	Venue	Result	Attendance	Goalscorers
R3	7 January 1996	Leeds United	H	2–4	16,155	Simpson, Gabbiadini

=== League Cup ===
Round	Date	Opponent	Venue	Result	Attendance	Goalscorers
R2 First Leg	19 September 1995	Shrewsbury Town	A	3–1	3,170	Simpson, Gabbiadini, Stallard
R2 Second Leg	4 October 1995	Shrewsbury Town	H	1–1	8,825	Willems
R3	25 October 1995	Leeds United	H	0–1	16,030	

== Players ==
=== First-team squad ===
The following players all appeared for the first team this season.

Note: Flags indicate national team as defined under FIFA eligibility rules; some limited exceptions apply. Players may hold more than one non-FIFA nationality.

No.	Pos.	Nation	Player
—	GK	ENG	Russell Hoult
—	GK	ENG	Andy Quy
—	GK	ENG	Steve Sutton
—	DF	ENG	Chris Boden
—	DF	ENG	Matt Carbon
—	DF	ENG	Jason Kavanagh
—	DF	ENG	Shane Nicholson
—	DF	ENG	Chris Powell
—	DF	ENG	Gary Rowett
—	DF	ENG	Wayne Sutton
—	DF	ENG	Darren Wassall
—	DF	ENG	Simon Webster (on loan from West Ham United)
—	DF	ENG	Dean Yates
—	DF	CRO	Igor Štimac
—	MF	ENG	Lee Carsley (Note: Carsley was born in Birmingham, England, but qualified to represent the Republic of Ireland internationally through his grandmother and would make his international debut for Ireland in 1997.)

No.	Pos.	Nation	Player
—	MF	ENG	Kevin Cooper
—	MF	ENG	Glyn Hodges
—	MF	ENG	Sean Flynn
—	MF	ENG	Darryl Powell (Note: Powell was born in Lambeth, England, but qualified to represent Jamaica internationally and would make his international debut for Jamaica in 1998.)
—	MF	ENG	David Preece
—	MF	ENG	Paul Simpson
—	MF	ENG	Paul Trollope (Note: Trollope was born in Swindon, England, but also qualified to represent Wales internationally and would make his international debut for Wales in May 1997.)
—	MF	ENG	Darren Wrack
—	MF	NED	Robin van der Laan
—	FW	ENG	Marco Gabbiadini
—	FW	ENG	Mark Stallard
—	FW	ENG	Dean Sturridge
—	FW	ENG	Ashley Ward
—	FW	NED	Ron Willems

=== Reserve team ===
The following players did not appear for the first team this season.

Note: Flags indicate national team as defined under FIFA eligibility rules; some limited exceptions apply. Players may hold more than one non-FIFA nationality.

No.	Pos.	Nation	Player
—	GK	ENG	Martin Taylor
—	DF	ENG	Rob Kozluk

No.	Pos.	Nation	Player
—	FW	ENG	Nick Wright
