= 1997–98 Derby County F.C. season =

Derby County F.C.
1997–98 season
- Chairman: Lionel Pickering
- Manager: Jim Smith
- Stadium: Pride Park
- FA Premier League: 9th
- FA Cup: Fourth round
- League Cup: Fourth round
- Top goalscorer: League: Paulo Wanchope (13); All: Paulo Wanchope (17)
- Highest home attendance: 30,492 vs. Liverpool (10 May 1998)
- Lowest home attendance: 25,625 vs. Southampton (27 September 1997)
- Average home league attendance: 29,105

The 1997–98 English football season was Derby County's second consecutive season in the FA Premier League.

== Season summary ==
Derby County began life at their new stadium by progressing further on the previous season's solid 12th-place finish. Jim Smith's team emerged as surprise contenders for a UEFA Cup place, and European qualification (for the first time in over 20 years) was still a possibility on the final day of the season. But results didn't go Derby's way, and that final European place went to Aston Villa.

The end-of-season arrival of Argentine defender Horacio Carbonari gave Derby fans fresh hope of challenging for a place in Europe.

== Final league table ==
Pos	Team	Pld	W	D	L	GF	GA	GD	Pts	Qualification or relegation
7	Aston Villa	38	17	6	15	49	48	+1	57	Qualification for the UEFA Cup first round (Note: Aston Villa was rewarded entry to the UEFA Cup through UEFA Fair Play ranking.)
8	West Ham United	38	16	8	14	56	57	−1	56	
9	Derby County	38	16	7	15	52	49	+3	55	
10	Leicester City	38	13	14	11	51	41	+10	53	
11	Coventry City	38	12	16	10	46	44	+2	52	

Source: Premier League
Rules for classification: 1) points; 2) goal difference; 3) number of goals scored.
Notes:

Results summary

Overall								Home						Away					
Pld	W	D	L	GF	GA	GD	Pts	W	D	L	GF	GA	GD	W	D	L	GF	GA	GD
38	16	7	15	52	49	+3	55	12	3	4	33	18	+15	4	4	11	19	31	−12

Source: 1997–98 FA Premier League table

Results by round

Round	1	2	3	4	5	6	7	8	9	10	11	12	13	14	15	16	17	18	19	20	21	22	23	24	25	26	27	28	29	30	31	32	33	34	35	36	37	38
Ground	A	A	H	H	A	A	H	A	H	H	A	H	A	H	A	H	A	A	H	H	A	H	A	H	H	A	A	H	H	A	H	A	H	A	H	A	A	H
Result	L	L	W	W	L	W	W	W	D	D	L	W	L	W	L	W	D	D	D	W	L	W	D	W	L	W	L	W	L	L	L	D	W	L	L	L	W	W
Position	19	18	16	10	15	12	8	6	7	6	7	6	8	5	8	7	7	7	7	7	7	6	6	6	6	6	6	6	7	7	8	9	7	9	10	10	9	9

Source: 11v11.com: 1997–98 Derby County results
A = Away; H = Home; W = Win; D = Draw; L = Loss

== Results ==
Derby County's score comes first

=== Legend ===
Win	Draw	Loss	Abandoned

=== FA Premier League ===
Date	Opponent	Venue	Result	Attendance	Scorers
9 August 1997	Blackburn Rovers	A	0–1	23,557	
13 August 1997 (Note: The match against Wimbledon on 13 August was abandoned due to floodlight failure after 56 minutes. It was rescheduled for 22 October.)	Wimbledon	H	Abd(2–1)	24,571	(Ward, Eranio)
23 August 1997	Tottenham Hotspur	A	0–1	25,886	
30 August 1997	Barnsley	H	1–0	27,232	Eranio (pen)
13 September 1997	Everton	H	3–1	27,828	Hunt, C Powell, Sturridge
20 September 1997	Aston Villa	A	1–2	35,444	Baiano
24 September 1997	Sheffield Wednesday	A	5–2	22,391	Baiano (2), Laursen, Wanchope, Burton
27 September 1997	Southampton	H	4–0	25,625	Eranio, Wanchope, Baiano, Sturridge
6 October 1997	Leicester City	A	2–1	19,585	Baiano (2)
18 October 1997	Manchester United	H	2–2	30,014	Baiano, Wanchope
22 October 1997	Wimbledon	H	1–1	28,595	Baiano
25 October 1997	Liverpool	A	0–4	38,017	
1 November 1997	Arsenal	H	3–0	30,004	Wanchope (2), Sturridge
8 November 1997	Leeds United	A	3–4	33,572	Sturridge (2), Asanović
22 November 1997	Coventry City	H	3–1	29,351	Baiano, Eranio (pen), Wanchope
29 November 1997	Chelsea	A	0–4	34,544	
6 December 1997	West Ham United	H	2–0	29,300	Mikloško (own goal), Sturridge
14 December 1997	Bolton Wanderers	A	3–3	23,037	Eranio, Baiano (2)
17 December 1997	Newcastle United	A	0–0	36,289	
20 December 1997	Crystal Palace	H	0–0	26,590	
26 December 1997	Newcastle United	H	1–0	30,232	Eranio (pen)
28 December 1997	Barnsley	A	0–1	18,686	
11 January 1998	Blackburn Rovers	H	3–1	27,823	Sturridge (2), Wanchope
17 January 1998	Wimbledon	A	0–0	13,031	
31 January 1998	Tottenham Hotspur	H	2–1	30,187	Sturridge, Wanchope
7 February 1998	Aston Villa	H	0–1	30,251	
14 February 1998	Everton	A	2–1	34,876	Štimac, Wanchope
21 February 1998	Manchester United	A	0–2	55,170	
28 February 1998	Sheffield Wednesday	H	3–0	30,203	Wanchope (2), Rowett
15 March 1998	Leeds United	H	0–5	30,217	
28 March 1998	Coventry City	A	0–1	18,705	
5 April 1998	Chelsea	H	0–1	30,062	
11 April 1998	West Ham United	A	0–0	25,155	
13 April 1998	Bolton Wanderers	H	4–0	29,126	Wanchope, Burton (2), Baiano
18 April 1998	Crystal Palace	A	1–3	18,101	Bohinen
26 April 1998	Leicester City	H	0–4	29,855	
29 April 1998	Arsenal	A	0–1	38,121	
2 May 1998	Southampton	A	2–0	15,202	Dailly, Sturridge
10 May 1998	Liverpool	H	1–0	30,492	Wanchope

=== FA Cup ===
Round	Date	Opponent	Venue	Result	Attendance	Goalscorers
R3	3 January 1998	Southampton	H	2–0	27,992	Baiano, C Powell
R4	24 January 1998	Coventry City	A	0–2	22,824	

=== League Cup ===
Round	Date	Opponent	Venue	Result	Attendance	Goalscorers
R2 1st Leg	16 September 1997	Southend United	A	1–0	4,011	Wanchope
R2 2nd Leg	1 October 1997	Southend United	H	5–0	18,490	Rowett (2), Wanchope, Sturridge, Trollope
R3	15 October 1997	Tottenham Hotspur	A	2–1	20,390	Wanchope (2)
R4	18 November 1997	Newcastle United	H	0–1	27,364	

== First-team squad ==
Squad at end of season

Note: Flags indicate national team as defined under FIFA eligibility rules; some limited exceptions apply. Players may hold more than one non-FIFA nationality.

No.	Pos.	Nation	Player
1	GK	(England) ENG	Russell Hoult
2	DF	(England) ENG	Gary Rowett
3	DF	(England) ENG	Chris Powell
4	MF	(Jamaica) JAM	Darryl Powell (Note: Powell was born in Lambeth, England, but also qualified to represent Jamaica internationally and made his international debut for Jamaica in 1998.)
5	DF	(England) ENG	Dean Yates
6	MF	(Croatia) CRO	Igor Štimac (captain)
7	MF	(Netherlands) NED	Robin van der Laan
8	FW	(England) ENG	Dean Sturridge
9	FW	(Costa Rica) CRC	Paulo Wanchope
10	MF	(Republic of Ireland) IRL	Rory Delap (Note: Delap was born in Sutton Coldfield, England, but also qualified to represent the Republic of Ireland internationally through his parents and represented them at U-21 level before making his international debut for the Republic of Ireland in March 1998.)
11	FW	(Netherlands) NED	Ron Willems
14	MF	(Norway) NOR	Lars Bohinen
15	MF	(England) ENG	Marc Bridge-Wilkinson

No.	Pos.	Nation	Player
16	DF	(Denmark) DEN	Jacob Laursen
18	MF	(Republic of Ireland) IRL	Lee Carsley (Note: Carsley was born in Birmingham, England, but also qualified to represent the Republic of Ireland internationally through his grandmother and represented them at U-21 and B level before making his international debut for Ireland in October 1997.)
19	DF	(England) ENG	Steve Elliott
20	MF	(Italy) ITA	Stefano Eranio
21	GK	(Estonia) EST	Mart Poom
22	DF	(Scotland) SCO	Christian Dailly
23	DF	(Costa Rica) CRC	Mauricio Solís
24	FW	(Jamaica) JAM	Deon Burton (Note: Burton was born in Reading, England, but also qualified to represent Jamaica internationally and made his international debut for Jamaica in September 1997.)
25	DF	(England) ENG	Rob Kozluk
26	MF	(England) ENG	Jonathan Hunt
27	FW	(Italy) ITA	Francesco Baiano
28	DF	(England) ENG	Craig Smith
29	GK	(England) ENG	Richard Knight

=== Left club during season ===
Note: Flags indicate national team as defined under FIFA eligibility rules; some limited exceptions apply. Players may hold more than one non-FIFA nationality.

No.	Pos.	Nation	Player
10	MF	(Croatia) CRO	Aljoša Asanović (to Napoli)
12	FW	(England) ENG	Ashley Ward (to Barnsley)
14	MF	(England) ENG	Paul Simpson (to Wolves)
15	MF	(Wales) WAL	Paul Trollope (Note: Trollope was born in Swindon, England, but also qualified to represent Wales internationally and made his international debut for Wales in May 1997.) (to Fulham)

No.	Pos.	Nation	Player
17	DF	(England) ENG	Matt Carbon (to West Bromwich Albion)
19	MF	(England) ENG	Sean Flynn (to West Bromwich Albion)
28	DF	(England) ENG	Wayne Sutton (to Woking)
—	FW	(England) ENG	Nick Wright (to Carlisle United)

== Transfers ==
=== In ===
Date	Pos	Name	From	Fee
20 May 1997	MF	Stefano Eranio	Milan	Free transfer
1 August 1997	FW	Francesco Baiano	Fiorentina	£650,000
6 August 1997	FW	Deon Burton	Portsmouth	£1,000,000
6 February 1998	MF	Rory Delap	Carlisle United	£200,000
25 March 1998	MF	Lars Bohinen	Blackburn Rovers	£1,450,000
23 May 1998	DF	Horacio Carbonari	Rosario Central	£2,700,000

=== Out ===
Date	Pos	Name	To	Fee
12 June 1997	GK	Martin Taylor	Wycombe Wanderers	Free transfer
6 August 1997	MF	Sean Flynn	West Bromwich Albion	£260,000
7 August 1997	MF	Kevin Cooper	Stockport County	£150,000
4 September 1997	FW	Ashley Ward	Barnsley	£1,300,000
1 November 1997	DF	Andrew Tretton	Chesterfield	Non-contract
11 November 1997	MF	Paul Simpson	Wolverhampton Wanderers	£75,000
27 November 1997	MF	Paul Trollope	Fulham	£600,000
29 December 1997	MF	Aljoša Asanović	Napoli	£350,000
26 January 1998	DF	Matt Carbon	West Bromwich Albion	£800,000
12 February 1998	FW	Nick Wright	Carlisle United	Transfer

Transfers in: ▼£6,000,000
Transfers out: ▲£3,535,000
Total spending: ▼£2,465,000
