= 1996–97 Derby County F.C. season =

Derby County F.C.
1996–97 season
- Chairman: Lionel Pickering
- Manager: Jim Smith
- Stadium: Baseball Ground
- FA Premier League: 12th
- FA Cup: Quarter-final
- League Cup: Second round
- Top goalscorer: League: Dean Sturridge (11); All: Dean Sturridge (14)
- Highest home attendance: 18,287 vs. Arsenal (11 May 1997)
- Lowest home attendance: 17,022 vs. Wimbledon (28 September 1996)
- Average home league attendance: 17,889
Home colours

The 1996–97 season was Derby County's first in the FA Premier League, following their promotion from the First Division the previous season.

== Season summary ==
Back in the top flight after a five-year exile, Jim Smith's Derby County side never looked in any real danger of an immediate return to Division One, and their 12th-place finish in the final table was their highest final position in eight years. Young striker Dean Sturridge received many plaudits for his goalscoring exploits, which sparked talk of a £7 million transfer to Arsenal, but the move never happened.

The highlight of the season was a 3–2 win against champions Manchester United at Old Trafford, with Paulo Wanchope scoring a "wonder goal" on his English league debut.

== Final league table ==
Pos	Team	Pld	W	D	L	GF	GA	GD	Pts
10	Tottenham Hotspur	38	13	7	18	44	51	−7	46
11	Leeds United	38	11	13	14	28	38	−10	46
12	Derby County	38	11	13	14	45	58	−13	46
13	Blackburn Rovers	38	9	15	14	42	43	−1	42
14	West Ham United	38	10	12	16	39	48	−9	42

Source: Premier League
Rules for classification: 1) points; 2) goal difference; 3) number of goals scored.

Results summary

Overall								Home						Away					
Pld	W	D	L	GF	GA	GD	Pts	W	D	L	GF	GA	GD	W	D	L	GF	GA	GD
38	11	13	14	45	58	−13	46	8	6	5	25	22	+3	3	7	9	20	36	−16

Source: Statto

Results by round

Round	1	2	3	4	5	6	7	8	9	10	11	12	13	14	15	16	17	18	19	20	21	22	23	24	25	26	27	28	29	30	31	32	33	34	35	36	37	38
Ground	H	A	A	H	A	H	A	H	H	A	A	H	H	A	H	A	H	A	A	H	A	A	A	H	H	H	A	H	A	A	H	A	H	H	A	H	A	H
Result	D	D	L	D	W	W	D	L	L	D	L	W	W	D	W	D	L	L	L	D	D	L	D	L	W	D	L	W	L	L	W	W	D	W	L	D	W	L
Position	7	13	15	16	12	9	9	11	13	12	16	11	10	11	9	11	11	11	12	11	13	15	16	16	13	12	13	12	14	14	14	12	12	11	12	11	10	12

Source: Statto.com
A = Away; H = Home; W = Win; D = Draw; L = Loss

== Results ==
Derby County's score comes first

=== Legend ===
Win	Draw	Loss

=== FA Premier League ===
Date	Opponent	Venue	Result	Attendance	Scorers
17 August 1996	Leeds United	H	3–3	17,925	Sturridge (2), Paul Simpson
21 August 1996	Tottenham Hotspur	A	1–1	28,219	Dailly
24 August 1996	Aston Villa	A	0–2	34,646	
4 September 1996	Manchester United	H	1–1	18,025	Laursen
9 September 1996	Blackburn Rovers	A	2–1	19,214	Willems, Flynn
14 September 1996	Sunderland	H	1–0	17,692	Asanović (pen)
21 September 1996	Sheffield Wednesday	A	0–0	23,487	
28 September 1996	Wimbledon	H	0–2	17,022	
12 October 1996	Newcastle United	H	0–1	18,092	
19 October 1996	Nottingham Forest	A	1–1	27,771	Dailly
27 October 1996	Liverpool	A	1–2	39,515	Ward
2 November 1996	Leicester City	H	2–0	18,010	Ward, Whitlow (own goal)
17 November 1996	Middlesbrough	H	2–1	17,350	Asanović, Vickers (own goal)
23 November 1996	West Ham United	A	1–1	24,576	Sturridge
30 November 1996	Coventry City	H	2–1	18,042	Asanović (pen), Ward
7 December 1996	Arsenal	A	2–2	38,018	Sturridge, Powell
16 December 1996	Everton	H	0–1	17,252	
21 December 1996	Southampton	A	1–3	14,901	Dailly
26 December 1996	Sunderland	A	0–2	22,512	
28 December 1996	Blackburn Rovers	H	0–0	17,847	
11 January 1997	Wimbledon	A	1–1	11,467	Willems
18 January 1997	Chelsea	A	1–3	27,639	Asanović
29 January 1997	Leeds United	A	0–0	27,523	
1 February 1997	Liverpool	H	0–1	18,102	
15 February 1997	West Ham United	H	1–0	18,057	Asanović (pen)
19 February 1997	Sheffield Wednesday	H	2–2	18,060	Sturridge, Štimac
22 February 1997	Leicester City	A	2–4	20,323	Sturridge (2)
1 March 1997	Chelsea	H	3–2	18,039	Minto (own goal), Asanović, Ward
5 March 1997	Middlesbrough	A	1–6	29,739	Simpson
15 March 1997	Everton	A	0–1	32,140	
22 March 1997	Tottenham Hotspur	H	4–2	18,083	van der Laan, Trollope, Sturridge, Ward
5 April 1997	Manchester United	A	3–2	55,243	Ward, Wanchope, Sturridge
9 April 1997	Southampton	H	1–1	17,839	Ward
12 April 1997	Aston Villa	H	2–1	18,071	Rowett, van der Laan
19 April 1997	Newcastle United	A	1–3	36,550	Sturridge
23 April 1997	Nottingham Forest	H	0–0	18,087	
3 May 1997	Coventry City	A	2–1	22,854	Burrows (own goal), Sturridge
11 May 1997	Arsenal	H	1–3	18,287	Ward

=== FA Cup ===
Round	Date	Opponent	Venue	Result	Attendance	Goalscorers
R3	21 January 1997	Gillingham	A	2–0	9,508	Willems, van der Laan
R4	25 January 1997	Aston Villa	H	3–1	17,977	van der Laan, Sturridge, Willems
R5	26 February 1997	Coventry City	H	3–2	18,003	Ward, van der Laan, Sturridge
QF	8 March 1997	Middlesbrough	H	0–2	17,567	

=== League Cup ===
Round	Date	Opponent	Venue	Result	Attendance	Goalscorers
R2 1st Leg	17 September 1996	Luton Town	A	0–1	4,459	
R2 2nd Leg	25 September 1996	Luton Town	H	2–2 (lost 2–3 on agg)	13,569	Sturridge, Simpson

== Players ==
=== First-team squad ===
Squad at end of season

Note: Flags indicate national team as defined under FIFA eligibility rules; some limited exceptions apply. Players may hold more than one non-FIFA nationality.

No.	Pos.	Nation	Player
1	GK	ENG	Russell Hoult
2	DF	ENG	Gary Rowett
3	DF	ENG	Chris Powell
4	MF	ENG	Darryl Powell (Note: Powell was born in Lambeth, England, but qualified to represent Jamaica internationally and would make his international debut for Jamaica in 1998.)
5	DF	ENG	Dean Yates
6	MF	CRO	Igor Štimac (captain)
7	MF	NED	Robin van der Laan
8	FW	ENG	Dean Sturridge
9	FW	ENG	Marco Gabbiadini
10	MF	CRO	Aljoša Asanović
11	FW	NED	Ron Willems
12	FW	ENG	Ashley Ward
13	GK	ENG	Martin Taylor
14	MF	ENG	Paul Simpson
15	MF	ENG	Paul Trollope (Note: Trollope was born in Swindon, England, but qualified to represent Wales internationally and would make his international debut for Wales in May 1997.)

No.	Pos.	Nation	Player
16	DF	DEN	Jacob Laursen
17	DF	ENG	Matt Carbon
18	MF	IRL	Lee Carsley (Note: Carsley was born in Birmingham, England, but qualified to represent the Republic of Ireland internationally through his grandmother and represented them at U-21 and B level before making his international debut for Ireland in October 1997.)
19	MF	ENG	Sean Flynn
20	DF	ENG	Darren Wassall
21	GK	EST	Mart Poom
22	DF	SCO	Christian Dailly
23	DF	CRC	Mauricio Solís
24	MF	ENG	Kevin Cooper
25	DF	ENG	Rob Kozluk
26	FW	CRC	Paulo Wanchope
27	DF	IRL	Paul McGrath (Note: McGrath was born in Ealing, England to an Irish mother and Nigerian father, but was raised in the Republic of Ireland and made his international debut for Ireland in 1985.)
28	DF	ENG	Wayne Sutton
29	MF	ENG	Nick Wright
30	GK	ENG	Andy Quy

=== Left club during season ===
Note: Flags indicate national team as defined under FIFA eligibility rules; some limited exceptions apply. Players may hold more than one non-FIFA nationality.

No.	Pos.	Nation	Player
21	DF	ENG	Jason Kavanagh (to Wycombe Wanderers)
21	FW	SWE	Marino Rahmberg (on loan from Degerfors IF)

No.	Pos.	Nation	Player
23	DF	ENG	Paul Parker (to Sheffield United)

=== Reserve squad ===
The following players did not appear for the first team this season.

Note: Flags indicate national team as defined under FIFA eligibility rules; some limited exceptions apply. Players may hold more than one non-FIFA nationality.

No. / Pos. / Nation / Player; — / DF / ENG / Steve Elliott	No. / Pos. / Nation / Player; — / DF / ENG / Andrew Tretton

== Statistics ==
=== Starting 11 ===
- GK: #1, (England) Russell Hoult, 31
- RB: #2, (England) Gary Rowett, 35
- CB: #27, (Republic of Ireland) Paul McGrath, 23
- CB: #22, (Scotland) Christian Dailly, 31
- CB: #16, (Denmark) Jacob Laursen, 35
- LB: #3, (England) Chris Powell, 35
- CM: #6, (Croatia) Igor Štimac, 21
- CM: #10, (Croatia) Aljoša Asanović, 34
- CM: #4, (England) Darryl Powell, 27
- CF: 8, (England) Dean Sturridge, 29
- CF: #12, (England) Ashley Ward, 25
