= Chris Powell =

English footballer and manager (born 1969)

Chris Powell MBE
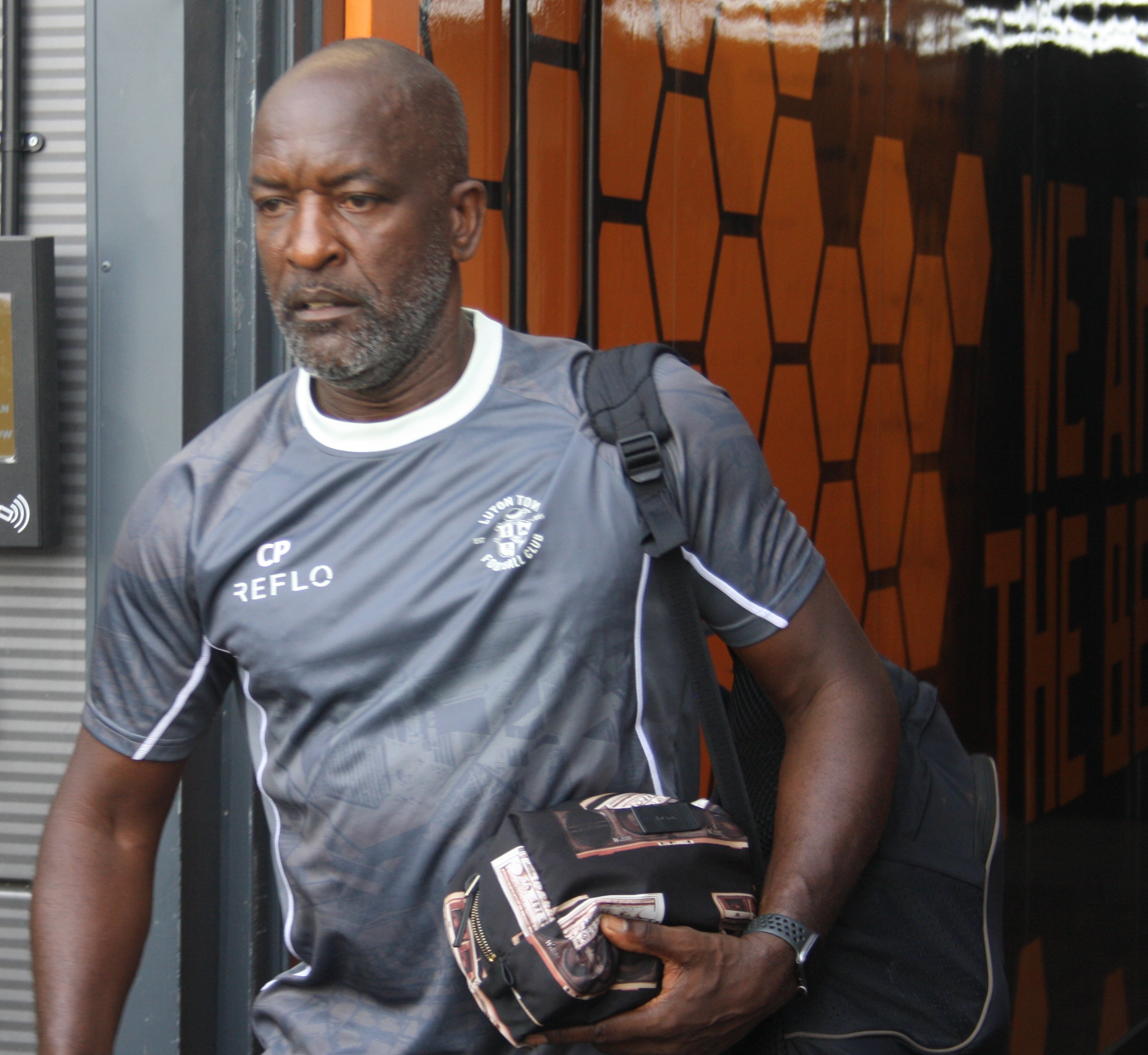
- Powell in 2026

Personal information
- Full name: Christopher George Robin Powell
- Date of birth: 8 September 1969 (age 57)
- Place of birth: Lambeth, Greater London, England
- Height: 5 ft 10 in (1.78 m)
- Position: Left back

Team information
- Current team: Luton Town (assistant manager)

Youth career
- 1985–1986: Epsom & Ewell
- 1986–1987: Crystal Palace

Senior career*
Years	Team	Apps	(Gls)
1987–1990	Crystal Palace	3	(0)
1990	→ Aldershot (loan)	11	(0)
1990–1996	Southend United	248	(3)
1996–1998	Derby County	91	(1)
1998–2004	Charlton Athletic	200	(1)
2004	→ West Ham United (loan)	13	(0)
2004–2005	West Ham United	23	(0)
2005–2006	Charlton Athletic	27	(0)
2006–2007	Watford	15	(0)
2007–2008	Charlton Athletic	17	(1)
2008–2010	Leicester City	19	(0)
Total		667	(6)

International career
2001–2002	England	5	(0)

Managerial career
- 2010: Leicester City (caretaker)
- 2011–2014: Charlton Athletic
- 2014–2015: Huddersfield Town
- 2016: Derby County (caretaker)
- 2018–2019: Southend United
- * Club domestic league appearances and goals

Christopher George Robin Powell (born 8 September 1969) is an English football manager and former player who is currently assistant manager at EFL League One club Luton Town.

As a left back, Powell played for Southend United, Derby County, Charlton Athletic, West Ham United, Watford and Leicester City. He also made five appearances for the England national team.

With Charlton he had three spells as a player over eight seasons and in the 1999–2000 season was part of the squad that won the First Division to be promoted to the Premier League.

After finishing his playing career at Leicester City in 2010, Powell became first team coach. He then returned to Charlton Athletic as manager. In the 2011–12 season, Charlton were promoted to the Championship as League One champions in Powell's first full season as a manager. He has also managed Huddersfield Town from 2014 to 2015. He was assistant manager at Derby County from 2016 to 2017, including a spell as caretaker manager. He then managed Southend United from January 2018 to March 2019.

Powell served as chairman of the Professional Footballers' Association from November 2005 until he retired. In October 2009 Powell was named as one of 50 ambassadors for England's 2018 World Cup bid.

== Club career ==
=== Early career ===
After leaving Raynes Park High School, Powell spent the 1985–86 season playing for the Epsom & Ewell youth team alongside a young Matt Elliott. He began his professional career in December 1987 as a trainee at Crystal Palace with Ian Wright but failed to become a regular with the first team. He spent time on loan at Aldershot, where he made 11 appearances.

=== Southend United ===
In August 1990, Powell moved on a free transfer to Essex club Southend United. In six years at the club Powell made 288 first-team appearances. In November 2004 a BBC poll of Southend United supporters voted Powell their all-time cult hero. One fan described him as "A very skilled, left-footed defender, who could quite possibly be considered one of the nicest men in football, a true gent."

=== Derby County ===
In January 1996 Powell moved to Derby County for a fee of £750,000. He made 99 first-team appearances before being transferred to Charlton Athletic in June 1998 for a fee of £825,000. Powell was a favourite of the Derby fans, and won the Supporters' Player of the Year award for the 1996–97 season. He scored twice during his spell at Derby, with both goals coming in the 1997–98 season: against Everton in the league and Southampton in the FA Cup.

=== Charlton Athletic ===
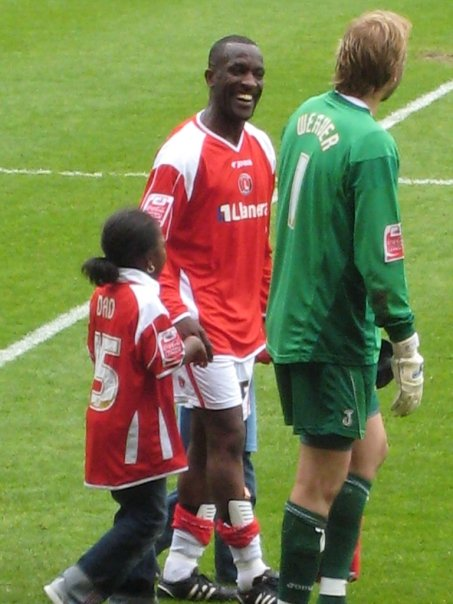
Powell at Charlton Athletic in 2008

While at Charlton, he made 200 first-team appearances, and evidently caught the eye of Sven-Göran Eriksson, who picked him for the England team in 2001, at the unusually late age of 31. He was the oldest England debutant since Syd Owen in 1954. At Charlton he delighted the crowds after each home victory with his exuberant leaps of celebration. Powell scored twice during his first spell with the Addicks, with both goals coming against Tottenham Hotspur; once in the league and once in the FA Cup.

Shortly after the start of the 2004–05 season, Powell was allowed to move to West Ham United, where he played a major part in their successful promotion campaign. However, during the summer of 2005 he and West Ham were unable to agree terms for a further contract and he returned to Charlton on a one-year contract, with a suggestion that he would develop his coaching skills.

Typically consistent performance belying his years throughout 2005–06 saw Powell regain his place as Charlton's first choice left back, rotated with loanee Jonathan Spector, due to Hermann Hreiðarsson's move to the centre of defence. On 1 July 2006, he signed a one-year contract with Premiership newcomers Watford as Aidy Boothroyd looked to add some experience to his youthful squad. He was released by the club after one year. In July 2007, Powell returned to Charlton for a third spell, primarily as a coach. He made his last appearance for Charlton on 4 May 2008, coming on as substitute for the last five minutes in the final game of the season, against Coventry, and scoring only his third goal for the club to seal a 4–1 victory.

=== Leicester City ===
Powell joined League Two side AFC Bournemouth on a trial basis in July 2008. whilst the club looked to see if he could bring much needed experience to their defence. He joined Leicester City on a six-month contract on 23 August 2008. He made his debut against Fulham in Leicester's League Cup second round 3–2 defeat, playing the full 90 minutes.

On 6 December 2008, Powell started his 750th career appearance against former club Southend; Leicester won the game 3–0. He signed a contract extension that would see him stay at the club until the end of the 2008–09 season on 5 January 2009.

In July 2009, Powell signed a contract to be a player-coach at Leicester City, becoming first team development coach, and also re-registering himself as a player. With teammates Bruno Berner out with a calf injury and Ryan McGivern struggling with form, Powell played his first league match on 26 January 2010, in a 1–0 defeat to Barnsley. He retired from playing at the end of the 2009–10 season; his final appearance came on 27 March 2010 against his former club Derby County.

== International career ==
Powell was called-up for England in 2001 under Sven-Göran Eriksson, earning his first cap against Spain. Powell earned five caps in total.

== Coaching and managerial career ==
=== Leicester City ===
Having served as a player coach under Nigel Pearson, Powell was retained by incoming Leicester City manager Paulo Sousa in the summer of 2010. In October, Powell was named caretaker manager with Mike Stowell of the Foxes after Sousa was sacked. Their first, and only, game in charge came against Scunthorpe United; Leicester won the game 3–1. He remained a coach at the club after Sousa's replacement, Sven-Göran Eriksson, was appointed. Eriksson—who selected Powell for his England caps—commented in December 2010 that Powell "will be a very good manager in the future".

=== Charlton Athletic ===
On 14 January 2011, Powell was appointed manager of Charlton Athletic, who were by now languishing in League One. He signed a three-and-a-half-year contract following the sacking of Phil Parkinson.

His first signing of his managerial career was Bradley Wright-Phillips, who went on to score on his debut on 1 February 2011, against Colchester United. Powell won his opening four games at Charlton, but then went 11 games without a win, falling out of the play-off places and leaving the Addicks in 13th place at the end of the season.

Powell signed 19 new players in summer 2011, including midfielders Danny Green, Danny Hollands, Dale Stephens, defenders Matt Taylor, Rhoys Wiggins and goalkeeper Ben Hamer. Bradley Pritchard was signed from non-league club Hayes & Yeading United and excelled in midfield, with Yann Kermorgant forming a formidable strike partnership alongside Wright-Phillips. Captain Johnnie Jackson was a talisman all season despite numerous injuries, and Chris Solly, a product of the youth academy made the right back berth his own. Clever loan signings were made throughout the season including Hogan Ephraim, Darel Russell, Dany N'Guessan and the return of Lee Cook. Charlton finished strongly into the second half of the 2011–12 season and sealed promotion back to the Championship as champions of League One. Charlton finished the 2012–13 season in 9th place, ending with a 4–1 victory over already relegated Bristol City and three points off a play-off position.

On 11 March 2014, Powell was sacked as manager of Charlton Athletic by owner Roland Duchâtelet; this decision came after a poor run of form with the Addicks sitting at the bottom of the Championship table, although media reports have suggested that it was a reluctance to play players Roland Duchâtelet had brought to the club and differences in transfer policy.

=== Huddersfield Town ===
On 3 September 2014, Powell was named the new manager of Huddersfield Town on a rolling contract, following the resignation of Mark Robins after the first game of the season. Ten days later, in his first game in charge at the John Smith's Stadium, Huddersfield lost 2–1 to Middlesbrough: Jon Stead had equalised for Huddersfield with four minutes to play but Grant Leadbitter scored the winner with an added-time penalty. In November, Powell took in on loan Diego Poyet, a player whom he had given a professional debut at Charlton. He signed Grant Holt on an emergency loan from Wigan. On 28 December 2014, Holt returned to his parent club after a successful operation on his knee, though it kept him out for nine months. Chris Powell was sacked by Huddersfield Town on 4 November 2015

=== Derby County ===
On 27 May 2016, Powell was named the new assistant manager of Derby County alongside new manager Nigel Pearson, who had also managed him at Leicester City. On 27 September, Powell was appointed caretaker manager after Pearson was suspended by Derby chairman Mel Morris. On 12 October 2016, Powell reverted to his previous role of assistant manager upon the reappointment of Steve McClaren as manager. Powell left Derby in March 2017 following the sacking of McClaren.

=== Southend United ===
Powell returned to management on 23 January 2018, taking over at Southend United, signing a two-and-a-half-year contract. He is the only permanent Southend United manager to have won his first three matches. After 11 games without a win and with the club in 20th place in the league, on goal difference off the relegation zone, Powell was sacked as manager of Southend United on 26 March 2019.

=== England ===
In September 2019, Powell was appointed as a coach for the England national football team under manager Gareth Southgate.

In March 2023, it was announced that Powell would step down from his job as a coach with England to focus on his role at Tottenham Hotspur.

=== ADO Den Haag ===
In December 2019, Powell was appointed as assistant coach to Alan Pardew at ADO Den Haag in the Netherlands. Both Pardew and Powell left ADO Den Haag on 28 April 2020 following the premature ending of the 2019–20 Eredivisie due to the 2020 coronavirus pandemic.

=== Tottenham Hotspur ===
In August 2020, Powell was appointed as head of coaching for the Tottenham Hotspur Academy while continuing his job as a coach with England. On 20 April 2021, Powell was named as an interim assistant head coach at Tottenham alongside Nigel Gibbs, working with interim head coach Ryan Mason. On 1 August 2023 Powell left his position as head of coaching for the club's youth teams from Under-17 to U21 level.

=== Sheffield Wednesday ===
On 20 October 2023, Powell was appointed as assistant coach to newly appointed manager Danny Röhl. It was announced he had left the club in July 2025, following manager Danny Röhl leaving the club.

=== Walsall ===
On 29 September 2025, it was confirmed that he had joined the coaching staff at Walsall on an interim basis.

=== Luton Town ===
On 13 October 2025, Powell joined Luton Town as assistant manager to the newly appointed Jack Wilshere. In his first season with the club, Luton won the 2025–26 EFL Trophy.

== Personal life ==
Powell is a Christian. He is an ambassador for numerous charities and organizations.

Since 2020, Powell has appeared alongside Arlo White as a co-commentator in the Apple TV+ series Ted Lasso in all four seasons.

Powell was appointed a Member of the Order of the British Empire (MBE) in the 2024 Birthday Honours "for services to association football".

== Career statistics ==
Appearances and goals by club, season and competition
Club	Season	League			Cup		League Cup		Other		Total	
Club	Season	Division	Apps	Goals	Apps	Goals	Apps	Goals	Apps	Goals	Apps	Goals
Crystal Palace												
Aldershot (loan)	1989–90	Fourth Division	11	0	0	0	0	0	0	0	11	0
Southend United	1990–91	Third Division	45	1							45	1
Southend United	1991–92	Second Division	44	0							44	0
Southend United	1992–93	First Division	42	2							42	2
Southend United	1993–94	First Division	46	0							46	0
Southend United	1994–95	First Division	44	0							44	0
Southend United	1995–96	First Division	27	0	1	0	2	0	0	0	30	0
Southend United	Total		248	3	8	0	13	0	21	0	290	3
Derby County	1995–96	First Division	19	0	0	0	0	0	–		19	0
Derby County	1996–97	Premier League	35	0	3	0	1	0	–		39	0
Derby County	1997–98	Premier League	37	1	2	1	4	0	–		43	2
Derby County	Total		91	1	5	1	5	0	–		101	2
Charlton Athletic	1998–99	Premier League	38	0	1	0	3	0	–		42	0
Charlton Athletic	1999–2000	First Division	40	0	4	0	0	0	–		44	0
Charlton Athletic	2000–01	Premier League	33	0	1	1	2	0	–		36	1
Charlton Athletic	2001–02	Premier League	36	1	2	0	3	0	–		41	1
Charlton Athletic	2002–03	Premier League	37	0	0	0	0	0	–		37	0
Charlton Athletic	2003–04	Premier League	16	0	0	0	1	0	–		17	0
Charlton Athletic	2004–05	Premier League	0	0	–		–		–		0	0
Charlton Athletic	Total		200	1	8	1	9	0	–		217	2
West Ham United (loan)	2004–05	Championship	13	0	–		–		–		13	0
West Ham United	2004–05	Championship	23	0	3	0	0	0	3	0	29	0
Charlton Athletic	2005–06	Premier League	27	0	5	0	2	0	–		34	0
Watford	2006–07	Premier League	15	0	3	0	0	0	–		18	0
Charlton Athletic	2007–08	Championship	17	1	0	0	2	0	–		19	1
Leicester City	2008–09	League One	17	0	1	0	1	0	3	0	22	0
Leicester City	2009–10	Championship	2	0	0	0	2	0	0	0	4	0
Leicester City	Total		19	0	1	0	3	0	3	0	26	0
Career total			667	6	33	2	35	0	28	0	763	8

== Managerial statistics ==
As of 23 March 2019

Team	Nat	From	To	Record				
Team	Nat	From	To	P	W	D	L	Win %
Leicester City (caretaker)	(England)	1 October 2010	3 October 2010	1	1	0	0	100.00
Charlton Athletic	(England)	17 January 2011	11 March 2014	161	66	43	52	40.99
Huddersfield Town	(England)	3 September 2014	4 November 2015	57	15	20	22	26.32
Derby County (caretaker)	(England)	27 September 2016	12 October 2016	2	1	1	0	50.00
Southend United	(England)	23 January 2018	26 March 2019	66	24	13	29	36.36
Total				287	107	77	103	37.28

== Honours ==
=== As a player ===
Charlton Athletic

- Football League First Division: 1999–2000

West Ham United

- Football League Championship play-offs: 2005

Leicester City

- Football League One: 2008–09

Individual

- PFA Team of the Year: 1999–2000 First Division

=== As a manager ===
Charlton Athletic

- Football League One: 2011–12

Individual

- Football League One Manager of the Month: November 2011, January 2012, February 2012
- League Managers Association League One Manager of the Year: 2011–12
