= Christian Dailly =

Scottish footballer (born 1973)

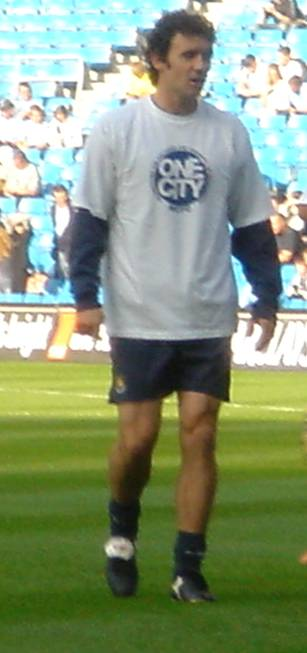
- Dailly in 2005

Personal information
- Full name: Christian Eduard Dailly
- Date of birth: 23 October 1973 (age 53)
- Place of birth: Dundee, Scotland
- Height: 6 ft 0 in (1.83 m)
- Position: Centre-back

Senior career*
Years	Team	Apps	(Gls)
1990–1996	Dundee United	143	(18)
1996–1998	Derby County	67	(4)
1998–2001	Blackburn Rovers	70	(4)
2001–2008	West Ham United	158	(3)
2007	→ Southampton (loan)	11	(0)
2008–2009	Rangers	21	(2)
2009–2011	Charlton Athletic	76	(1)
2011	Portsmouth	1	(0)
2012	Southend United	3	(0)
Total		550	(32)

International career
1990–1996	Scotland U21	35	(5)
1997–2008	Scotland	67	(6)
- * Club domestic league appearances and goals

Christian Eduard Dailly (born 23 October 1973) is a Scottish former professional footballer who played as a centre-back.

Dailly started his professional career as a teenager, playing as a striker for Dundee United. He helped them win the 1993–94 Scottish Cup. Towards the end of his time with United, Dailly began playing as a centre-back. He moved to English Premier League club Derby County in 1996. After two seasons with Derby, Dailly moved to Blackburn Rovers for a transfer fee of £5,350,000. During his time with Blackburn, the club were relegated in 1999 and Dailly lost his place in the team.

He moved to West Ham United in 2001 for £1,700,000. During his time with West Ham, the club were relegated in 2003 but won promotion in 2005. Dailly appeared as a substitute in the 2006 FA Cup final, which West Ham lost on penalties to Liverpool. After a loan spell with Southampton, Dailly moved to Rangers in January 2008. He helped the team reach the 2008 UEFA Cup final. His final appearance for Rangers was as a substitute in the 2009 Scottish Cup final, which Rangers won 1–0 against Falkirk. After a two-year spell with Charlton Athletic and short stints with Portsmouth and Southend United, Dailly retired in 2012.

Dailly made 67 full international appearances for Scotland between 1997 and 2008. He was part of the Scotland squad at the 1998 FIFA World Cup. Dailly is also the record cap-holder for the Scotland under-21 team, having made 35 appearances between 1990 and 1996.

== Club career ==
=== Dundee United ===
Dailly was born in Dundee and first signed professional terms with Dundee United on 2 August 1990, aged sixteen years old. He became the youngest-ever player to appear for Dundee United when he made his first-team debut on 21 August 1990, though this record has since been broken by Greg Cameron. Playing as a striker and scoring in each of his first three games, Dailly quickly shot to prominence, making his Scotland Under 21 side debut just a month later. He won the Scottish Youth Cup with the club in 1990–91. In his debut season, Dailly managed five goals in eighteen appearances. His debut season would become his most prolific, and the 1991–92 season brought just eight games with no goals. In the 1992–93 season, Dailly scored four from fourteen appearances and firmly established himself as a regular in the 1993–94 season with 38 league appearances, and not only another four goals, but also the Scottish Cup, when his shot rebounded off the post for Craig Brewster to score the only goal against Rangers.

The 1994–95 season ended in disappointment with relegation, with yet another four goals from 33 games. In 1995–96, Dailly was firmly established as a centre-back and started the season as United's club captain, although he was subsequently replaced by Dave Bowman. He scored just once in 30 appearances. It was an important goal though, as it ensured United drew the away leg of the short-lived league-playoff against Partick Thistle, and subsequently won the home leg to gain promotion at the first opportunity. This proved to be Dailly's final game for Dundee United, as he joined Derby County in August 1996 for £500,000, with a further £500,000 payable dependent on his international career, which was later paid.

=== Derby County ===
Dailly joined Derby County at the start of the 1996–97 season, following Derby's promotion to the Premier League. In his debut English season, Dailly missed just two games, with his three goals helping Derby to 12th place and six points clear of relegation. In the 1997–98 season, Dailly made 30 appearances and scored once; Derby fared even better, with the club finishing ninth and just two points from European football. In 1998–99, Dailly played just once, coincidentally against Blackburn Rovers, the club to which he was then transferred.

=== Blackburn Rovers ===
Dailly joined Rovers in August 1998 for £5.35m but a tumultuous season followed with Dailly not finding a settled position and an injury meaning he played just seventeen times. To make matters worse, Rovers were relegated from the Premier League as Dailly suffered relegation for the second time in his career. In the First Division, Dailly appeared 43 times in a hectic 1999–2000 season, which saw him score four goals. However, he fell out of favour with new boss Graeme Souness and in January 2001, after making just nine appearances that season, Dailly left for West Ham United in a £1.75m deal and returned to the Premier League. During his spell at Blackburn he played in a testimonial match for Celtic – scoring a late consolation goal against Liverpool in the Ronnie Moran testimonial match on 13 May 2000.

=== West Ham United ===
Following his transfer from Blackburn to the Hammers for a fee of £1.7m he made twelve appearances in 2000–01, helping the Hammers to 15th place. He also played in their 1–0 victory over Manchester United at Old Trafford in the FA Cup. The following season, Dailly played every minute of every game as West Ham finished in seventh place. 2002–03 proved to be a low point, as Dailly suffered relegation for a third time. Playing 26 times, West Ham were relegated with the highest number of points since the 1995–96 change to 20 teams, a total of 42.

Dailly was to go on and score twice from 43 games as West Ham finished in the Division One play-off positions in 2003–04. He scored the winner against Ipswich Town in the play-off semi-final to send them to the final but they failed to win promotion. Injury prevented Dailly from the majority of West Ham's promotion-winning 2004–05 season, although he returned to make brief appearances in one play-off semi-final leg and the final. He signed a new deal with West Ham in June 2005. Dailly appeared as a substitute for West Ham in their 2006 FA Cup final defeat to Liverpool, coming on in the 77th minute. Despite being 2–0 ahead after 28 minutes, West Ham eventually lost on penalties. He was the longest serving West Ham player at the time of his departure and something of a cult hero to the fans.

=== Southampton ===
On 20 September 2007, he joined Southampton on loan, initially for a month. The loan was extended for a further month as Saints continued to suffer with injuries to several defensive players. He made his debut against Barnsley in a 3–2 home league defeat on 22 September 2007. After eleven appearances for Saints he returned to West Ham.

=== Rangers ===
On 30 January 2008, Dailly signed for Rangers on a short-term contract until the end of the season. The club took over what remained of his contract from West Ham United. He made his Rangers debut three weeks later in a UEFA Cup match against Panathinaikos; the game ended in a 1–1 and saw the club progress to the fourth round. He scored his first goal 9 days later, netting the equaliser in a 3–1 triumph over Aberdeen. On 3 July 2008, he and David Weir signed new one-year contract extensions with the club. Dailly continued to play as part of the Rangers squad as they progressed to the 2008 UEFA Cup Final in Manchester.

The arrival of Madjid Bougherra then saw Dailly lose his place in the team until an injury to Bougherra saw him included in Rangers' 2009 Scottish League Cup final squad. He played his final game for the club in the 2009 Scottish Cup final as an 87th-minute substitute helping Rangers retain the Scottish Cup in a 1–0 victory over Falkirk. He was released two days later on 1 June 2009. Dailly made 36 appearances in total and scored twice for Rangers.

=== Charlton Athletic ===
On 31 July 2009, Dailly signed for Charlton Athletic on a Bosman free transfer and took squad number 35, his then age. His debut for Charlton came on 8 August 2009 in a 3–2 home win against Wycombe Wanderers, a game which saw Dailly score his only Charlton goal. At the end of the 2009–10 season he was named as Charlton Athletic's Player of the Year. "I feel very proud", Dailly told the official website.

=== Portsmouth ===
Dailly joined Portsmouth on a one-month deal in August 2011. He made his debut on 6 August 2011, in the 2–2 away draw against Middlesbrough, after coming off the bench to replace Hayden Mullins. On 1 September 2011, he was released.

=== Southend United ===
On 16 March 2012, Dailly signed for League Two side Southend United on non-contract terms, following several months training with the club to recuperate from a knee injury. Dailly made his debut for Southend on 17 March 2012, playing 90 minutes in the 3–2 win at Hereford United. In Dailly's third appearance for the club, against Bristol Rovers on 24 March 2012, he broke his toe ruling him out for the remainder of the season. Dailly retired from professional football in July 2012, after 22 years in the game.

== International career ==
On 11 September 1990, Dailly became the youngest player to appear for his country at under-21 level when he featured at the age of 16 against Romania at Easter Road. By the time Dailly was too old to continue playing at this level he had received 35 caps, a Scottish record for appearances at under-21 level.

In May 1993, he was included in Andy Roxburgh's Scotland squad for the first time for a 1994 FIFA World Cup qualification match in Estonia. He earned his first cap four years later when he made his full international debut in May 1997, aged 23, in a 1–0 defeat against Wales. His first goal came in just his second match, and just four days after his international debut, when his early goal helped Scotland to a 3–2 away victory over Malta in a friendly match.

Dailly had a long Scotland career, winning 67 caps and scoring 6 goals. He captained Scotland a total of 12 times and was selected for the Scotland squad at the 1998 FIFA World Cup. Dailly won his last cap as a substitute on Friday 30 May 2008, in a 3–1 friendly defeat against the Czech Republic.

Dailly was famously caught unaware after Germany's 2–1 defeat of Scotland on 10 September 2003. He returned to the dressing room after the match shouting, "Cheats! Fucking cheats! Fucking diving cheats!" The outburst was being broadcast live on BBC Scotland as then Scotland manager Berti Vogts was being interviewed by Chick Young. The player would have remained anonymous had it not been for Vogts shouting "Christian!" mid-interview to stop the tirade.

== Personal life ==
His sister, Stefani Dailly, is a broadcast journalist who has worked for STV News.

His son, Harvey, signed a development contract with Dundee United in August 2015. He made his first team debut in August 2017, but was released in January 2018.

== Career statistics ==
=== Club ===
Appearances and goals by club, season and competition
Club	Season	League			National cup		League cup		Other (Note: Includes Europe, Football League play-offs)		Total	
Club	Season	Division	Apps	Goals	Apps	Goals	Apps	Goals	Apps	Goals	Apps	Goals
Dundee United	1990–91	Scottish Premier Division	18	5	2	0	4	2	2	0	26	7
Dundee United	1991–92	Scottish Premier Division	8	0	0	0	0	0	0	0	8	0
Dundee United	1992–93	Scottish Premier Division	14	4	1	0	0	0	0	0	15	4
Dundee United	1993–94	Scottish Premier Division	38	3	6	0	4	0	2	0	50	3
Dundee United	1994–95	Scottish Premier Division	33	4	4	0	1	0	2	0	40	4
Dundee United	1995–96	Scottish First Division	32	2	2	0	1	0	4	1	39	3
Dundee United	Total		143	18	15	0	10	2	10	1	178	21
Derby County	1996–97	Premier League	36	3	4	0	2	0	0	0	42	3
Derby County	1997–98	Premier League	31	1	1	0	4	0	0	0	36	1
Derby County	1998–99	Premier League	1	0	0	0	0	0	0	0	1	0
Derby County	Total		68	4	5	0	6	0	0	0	79	4
Blackburn Rovers	1998–99	Premier League	17	0	0	0	2	0	2	0	21	0
Blackburn Rovers	1999–2000	First Division	43	4	4	0	1	0	0	0	48	4
Blackburn Rovers	2000–01	First Division	9	0	0	0	3	0	0	0	12	0
Blackburn Rovers	Total		69	4	4	0	6	0	2	0	81	4
West Ham United	2000–01	Premier League	12	0	3	0	0	0	0	0	15	0
West Ham United	2001–02	Premier League	38	0	3	0	1	0	0	0	42	0
West Ham United	2002–03	Premier League	26	0	2	0	1	0	0	0	29	0
West Ham United	2003–04	First Division	43	2	4	0	3	0	3	1	53	3
West Ham United	2004–05	Championship	3	0	0	0	0	0	2	0	5	0
West Ham United	2005–06	Premier League	22	0	6	0	2	1	0	0	30	1
West Ham United	2006–07	Premier League	14	0	2	0	1	0	0	0	17	0
West Ham United	Total		158	2	20	0	8	1	5	1	191	4
Southampton	2007–08	Championship	11	0	0	0	0	0	0	0	11	0
Rangers	2007–08	Scottish Premier League	12	2	4	0	1	0	5	0	22	2
Rangers	2008–09	Scottish Premier League	9	0	2	0	1	0	2	0	14	0
Rangers	Total		21	2	6	0	2	0	7	0	36	2
Charlton Athletic	2009–10	League One	44	1	1	0	0	0	4	0	49	1
Charlton Athletic	2010–11	League One	32	0	3	0	0	0	4	0	39	0
Charlton Athletic	Total		76	1	4	0	0	0	8	0	88	1
Portsmouth	2011–12	Championship	1	0	0	0	1	0	0	0	2	0
Southend United	2011–12	League Two	3	0	0	0	0	0	0	0	3	0
Career total			550	31	54	0	33	3	32	2	669	36

=== International ===
Appearances and goals by national team and year
National team	Year	Apps	Goals
Scotland	1997	6	1
Scotland	1998	8	0
Scotland	1999	6	0
Scotland	2000	6	0
Scotland	2001	4	0
Scotland	2002	10	3
Scotland	2003	10	0
Scotland	2004	3	0
Scotland	2005	7	1
Scotland	2006	4	1
Scotland	2007	2	0
Scotland	2008	1	0
Total		67	6

Scores and results list Scotland's goal tally first, score column indicates score after each Dailly goal.

List of international goals scored by Christian Dailly
No.	Date	Venue	Opponent	Score	Result	Competition	Ref.
1	1 June 1997	National Stadium, Ta' Qali, Malta	Malta	1–0	3–2	Friendly	
2	17 April 2002	Pittodrie Stadium, Aberdeen, Scotland	Nigeria	1–0	1–2	Friendly	
3	23 May 2002	Hong Kong Stadium, Hong Kong	Hong Kong League XI	3–0	4–0	Friendly	
4	12 October 2002	Laugardalsvollur, Reykjavík, Iceland	Iceland	1–0	2–0	UEFA Euro 2004 qualifying	
5	4 June 2005	Hampden Park, Glasgow, Scotland	Moldova	1–0	2–0	FIFA World Cup 2006 qualifying	
6	6 September 2006	Darius and Girėnas Stadium, Kaunas, Lithuania	Lithuania	1–0	2–1	UEFA Euro 2008 qualifying	

== Honours ==
Dundee United

- Scottish Cup: 1993–94
- Scottish Challenge Cup runner-up: 1995–96

West Ham United

- Football League Championship play-offs: 2005
- FA Cup runner-up: 2005–06

Rangers

- Scottish Premier League: 2008–09
- Scottish Cup: 2007–08, 2008–09
- Scottish League Cup: 2007–08
- UEFA Cup runner-up: 2007–08

Individual

- Scotland national football team roll of honour: 2003

== See also ==
- List of Scotland national football team captains
