= Gary Rowett =

English footballer (born 1974)

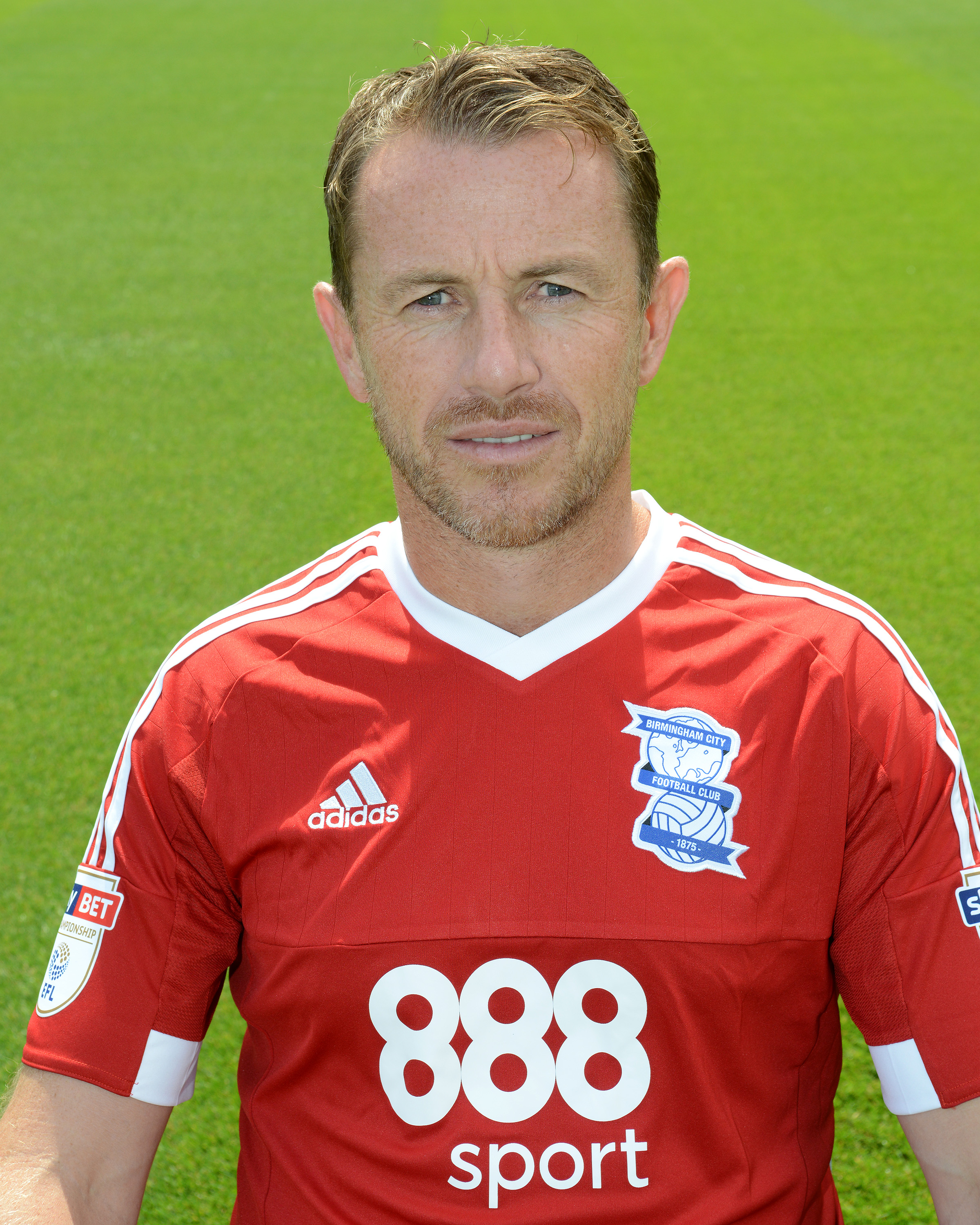
- Rowett with Birmingham City in 2016

Personal information
- Full name: Gary Rowett
- Date of birth: 6 March 1974 (age 52)
- Place of birth: Bromsgrove, Worcestershire, England
- Height: 6 ft 1 in (1.85 m)
- Position: Defender

Senior career*
Years	Team	Apps	(Gls)
1991–1994	Cambridge United	63	(9)
1994–1995	Everton	4	(0)
1995	→ Blackpool (loan)	17	(0)
1995–1998	Derby County	105	(2)
1998–2000	Birmingham City	87	(6)
2000–2002	Leicester City	49	(2)
2002–2004	Charlton Athletic	13	(1)
2005–2007	Burton Albion	43	(1)
Total		381	(21)

Managerial career
- 2012–2014: Burton Albion
- 2014–2016: Birmingham City
- 2017–2018: Derby County
- 2018–2019: Stoke City
- 2019–2023: Millwall
- 2024: Birmingham City
- 2024–2025: Oxford United
- 2026: Leicester City
- * Club domestic league appearances and goals

Gary Rowett (born 6 March 1974) is an English professional football manager and former player who is currently a pundit on Sky Sports.

As a player, he was a defender, and played in the Premier League for Everton, Derby County, Leicester City and Charlton Athletic. He also played in the Football League for Cambridge United, Blackpool, Birmingham City and Burton Albion. His professional career ended in 2004, through a knee injury.

In May 2009, he was appointed assistant manager to Paul Peschisolido at Burton, and took over as manager in 2012. He was appointed manager of Birmingham City in October 2014 and served until December 2016. He became Derby County manager in March 2017, and joined Stoke City in May 2018. After failing to mount a promotion challenge, he was dismissed in January 2019. He was appointed manager of Millwall in October 2019, before leaving by mutual consent four years later. He rejoined Birmingham City in March 2024 as interim manager until the end of the season. In December 2024, he joined Oxford United but was dismissed a year later in December 2025.

== Playing career ==
He started his career at Cambridge United as a product of their youth system. He was part of the Cambridge team which achieved fifth place in the 1991–92 Second Division, which remains the club's best league finish to date. They were also play-off semi-finalists that year. He was also part of their best ever League Cup run when they reached the quarter-finals the following season. After three seasons at the Abbey Stadium he earned a move to the Premiership with Everton in March 1994 for £200,000. Everton won the FA Cup in his first full season, but Rowett was not involved in the 1995 FA Cup run or the final against Manchester United. After failing to break into the first team, Rowett went on loan to Blackpool before being sold to Derby County in part-exchange for Craig Short. Rowett spent three seasons at Derby, followed by a two-year spell with Birmingham City, where he helped the club reach the play-offs.

In June 2000, Rowett returned to the Premier League by joining Leicester City. Southampton had been interested in him and bid £2 million, but could not match Leicester's £3 million due to the costs of their new stadium. He competed in the UEFA Cup, where Leicester lost in the first round on penalties to Red Star Belgrade. On 3 February 2001, Rowett scored his first top-flight goal for the club in a 2–1 win against Chelsea at Filbert Street.

In May 2002, he switched to Charlton Athletic for £3.5 million. Charlton manager Alan Curbishley had wanted to sign Rowett for years, but he chose Leicester as they were closer to his home and competing in the UEFA Cup. His only goal for them earned a 1–1 home draw against Sunderland on 3 November 2002. He retired from professional football in July 2004 due to a knee injury, weeks after his defensive partner Richard Rufus, having made only 13 league appearances in two years at The Valley. However, Rowett returned to play for Burton Albion in the Conference National, having been persuaded by manager Nigel Clough in 2005.

== Managerial career ==
=== Burton Albion ===
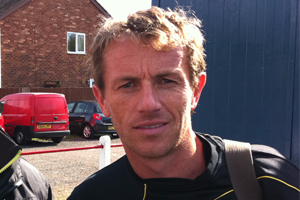
Pictured in 2011

In May 2009, Rowett was named as assistant to newly appointed manager Paul Peschisolido at Burton Albion. Rowett was put in temporary charge of Burton, assisted by Kevin Poole, following Peschisolido's dismissal in March 2012. On 10 May, Rowett was announced as the permanent manager of Burton Albion. In his first season, he led Burton to fourth place in League Two, losing in the play-off semi-final to Bradford City, and followed up with a sixth-place finish in 2013–14 and a 1–0 defeat to Fleetwood in the play-off final.

Whilst in charge of Burton, Rowett oversaw their best ever League Cup performance, as they reached the third round in 2012–13 before being eliminated by Bradford City. Burton equalled this achievement two years later under his successor Jimmy Floyd Hasselbaink. Rowett was also in charge for their two worst defeats in the Football League, losing both games 7–1. The first was against Bristol Rovers in April 2012, while he was still temporary manager, and the second against Port Vale in April 2013.

In September 2014, with Burton near the top of League Two, Rowett rejected the opportunity to manage Championship strugglers Blackpool; he said he felt it was not the right job for him at the time.

=== Birmingham City ===
On 27 October 2014, Rowett was appointed the manager of his former club, Birmingham City – one place above Blackpool at the bottom of the Championship table. He was joined at Birmingham by Burton backroom staff members Kevin Summerfield as assistant manager, Mark Sale as first-team coach and Poole as goalkeeping coach. All three are also former Birmingham City players. Rowett guided Birmingham from 21st in the Championship to 10th at the end of his first season, earning many plaudits for the remarkable turnaround in form.

Rowett was dismissed by Birmingham on 14 December 2016 upon their change of ownership and boardroom team, despite leading the team to 7th in the Championship table and challenging for a play-off place. The decision was met with surprise and criticism by Birmingham supporters, with the club appointing Gianfranco Zola as his replacement.

=== Derby County ===
Rowett was appointed as the new manager of Championship club Derby County, another of his former clubs as a player, on 14 March 2017, and signed a contract until the end of the 2018–19 season. Rowett took over with Derby sat in tenth place, taking fifteen points from their final nine games to guide them to a ninth-placed finish.

Rowett signed five players ahead of the 2017–18 season largely focusing on adding experience to a Derby side which had gained a reputation for post-Christmas slumps in form Players such as Tom Huddlestone (30) and Curtis Davies (32) raised the squad's average age to 28.2 years old, the second-highest in the division. After a slow start of just 3 wins from the opening 10 games left them 15th in the table, 13 wins from the following 20 matches saw the team climb to 2nd place at the turn of the year, with Rowett winning Championship Manager of the Month for October and December 2017. On 9 January 2018, Rowett was linked with the managerial vacancy at Premier League club Stoke City, but instead signed an improved contract at Derby, lasting until 2021.

Despite Rowett adding further experience to the squad with the signing of 31-year old Cameron Jerome in the January transfer window, Derby again suffered a post-January slump, winning just 2 out of 13 league matches, a run that included heavy defeats to relegation candidates Sunderland and Burton Albion to briefly fall out of the top 6, before a brief resurgence in their final three games saw them qualify for the playoffs on the final day of the season with a 6th-placed finish and 75 points. The play-off campaign ended in defeat, Derby losing 2–1 on aggregate to Fulham, despite winning the first leg. Soon after the end of the season, Rowett requested permission to talk to Stoke City about their vacant managerial position.

=== Stoke City ===
Rowett was appointed Stoke City manager on 22 May 2018, signing a three-year contract, with Stoke paying Derby around £2m in compensation. Stoke, having been relegated from the Premier League the previous season gave Rowett a large transfer budget. The players he brought in were goalkeeper Adam Federici, experienced centre back Ashley Williams, full-back Cuco Martina, midfielders Sam Clucas, Peter Etebo and Ryan Woods, wingers Tom Ince and James McClean and forward Benik Afobe. The team made a poor start to the campaign winning only two of their opening ten matches. Stoke won back-to-back games at the beginning of October against Bolton Wanderers and Norwich City before losing to Rowett's former club Birmingham.

Stoke were unbeaten for ten games through November and December, drawing six of them and conceding late equalisers on three occasions. Stoke's unbeaten run was ended by another defeat to Birmingham on Boxing Day. After poor results against Bolton Wanderers and Bristol City, some Stoke supporters began to call for Rowett's departure. Rowett's contract with Stoke was terminated by the club on 8 January 2019.

=== Millwall ===
On 21 October 2019, Rowett was appointed as the new Millwall manager, succeeding Neil Harris, who left after more than four years in the post. On his debut five days later, the team won 2–0 at home to his previous club Stoke. After finishing 8th, 11th and 9th in his first three seasons, he signed a new contract of undisclosed length in July 2022. In October 2023, Rowett left Millwall by mutual consent.

=== Return to Birmingham City ===
On 19 March 2024, Rowett returned to Birmingham City as interim manager until the end of the 2023–24 season, after incumbent manager Tony Mowbray took medical leave for the remainder of the season. Rowett oversaw the club's remaining eight league matches, winning three times, which was ultimately not enough to prevent relegation to League One on the final day of the season.

=== Oxford United ===
On 20 December 2024, Rowett was appointed head coach of Championship club Oxford United, replacing Des Buckingham, and won his first three games in charge. Six unbeaten matches, leading to a points return of twelve points, saw Rowett named EFL Championship Manager of the Month for January 2025. Under Rowett, Oxford avoided relegation at the end of the 2024–25 season, finishing in 17th place, but he was dismissed as head coach in December 2025 following a poor run of results, with the club in 22nd place at the time of his departure.

=== Leicester City ===
On 18 February 2026, Rowett was appointed as manager of Leicester City until the end of the 2025–26 season. On 22 February Rowett's first game in charge ended in a 2–2 draw with Stoke City. Rowett won his first game in a 2–0 victory over Bristol City at the King Power Stadium. Rowett picked up nine points before a 2–2 draw with Hull City which sealed Leicester's back-to-back relegations from the Premier League to League One. It marked only the second time in the club's history that they had been relegated to League One.

== Media career ==
Rowett reviewed Birmingham City matches with Tom Ross on radio station BRMB, and for the 2008–09 season, summarised matches involving Derby County for BBC Radio Derby.

== Career statistics ==
Appearances and goals by club, season and competition
Club	Season	League			FA Cup		League Cup		Other		Total	
Club	Season	Division	Apps	Goals	Apps	Goals	Apps	Goals	Apps	Goals	Apps	Goals
Cambridge United	1991–92	Second Division	13	2	3	0	1	0	1 (Note: Appearances in Full Members' Cup)	1	18	3
Cambridge United	1992–93	First Division	21	2	1	0	5	1	1 (Note: Appearances in Anglo-Italian Cup)	0	28	3
Cambridge United	1993–94	Second Division	29	5	3	0	1	0	3 (Note: Appearances in Football League Trophy)	2	36	7
Cambridge United	Total		63	9	7	0	7	1	5	3	82	13
Everton	1993–94	Premier League	2	0	0	0	0	0	0	0	2	0
Everton	1994–95	Premier League	2	0	0	0	0	0	0	0	2	0
Everton	Total		4	0	0	0	0	0	0	0	4	0
Blackpool (loan)	1994–95	Second Division	17	0	0	0	0	0	0	0	17	0
Derby County	1995–96	First Division	35	0	1	0	2	0	0	0	38	0
Derby County	1996–97	Premier League	35	1	4	0	2	0	0	0	41	1
Derby County	1997–98	Premier League	35	1	2	0	4	2	0	0	41	3
Derby County	Total		105	2	7	0	8	2	0	0	120	4
Birmingham City	1998–99	First Division	42	5	1	0	4	2	2 (Note: Appearances in Football League play-offs)	0	49	7
Birmingham City	1999–2000	First Division	45	1	2	1	5	1	2	1	54	4
Birmingham City	Total		87	6	3	1	9	3	4	1	103	11
Leicester City	2000–01	Premier League	38	2	4	1	1	0	2 (Note: Appearances in UEFA Cup)	0	45	3
Leicester City	2001–02	Premier League	11	0	0	0	1	0	0	0	12	0
Leicester City	Total		49	2	4	1	2	0	2	0	57	3
Charlton Athletic	2002–03	Premier League	12	1	0	0	0	0	0	0	12	1
Charlton Athletic	2003–04	Premier League	1	0	0	0	0	0	0	0	1	0
Charlton Athletic	Total		13	1	0	0	0	0	0	0	13	1
Burton Albion	2005–06	Conference Premier	17	0	1	0	0	0	0	0	18	0
Burton Albion	2006–07	Conference Premier	26	1	1	0	0	0	0	0	27	1
Burton Albion	Total		43	1	2	0	0	0	0	0	45	1
Career total			381	21	23	2	26	6	11	4	441	33

== Managerial statistics ==
As of match played 2 May 2026

Managerial record by team and tenure
Team	From	To	Record					Ref.
Team	From	To	P	W	D	L	Win %	Ref.
Burton Albion	17 March 2012	27 October 2014	142	63	34	45	44.4	
Birmingham City	27 October 2014	14 December 2016	106	42	32	32	39.6	
Derby County	14 March 2017	22 May 2018	60	26	18	16	43.3	
Stoke City	22 May 2018	8 January 2019	29	9	12	8	31.0	
Millwall	26 October 2019 (Note: Rowett was appointed on 21 October 2019, but did not take charge of the next day's match. Soccerbase figures incorrectly include that match, which was drawn.)	18 October 2023	196	76	57	63	38.8	
Birmingham City (interim)	25 March 2024	4 May 2024	8	3	2	3	37.5	
Oxford United	26 December 2024 (Note: Rowett was appointed on 20 December 2024, but did not take charge of the next day's match.)	23 December 2025	50	14	15	21	28.0	
Leicester City	18 February 2026	2 May 2026	14	2	8	4	14.3	
Total			604	234	178	192	38.7	

== Honours ==
=== Player ===
Individual

- PFA Team of the Year: 1998–99 First Division, 1999–2000 Second Division

=== Manager ===
Individual

- Championship Manager of the Month: October 2017, December 2017, January 2025
- League Two Manager of the Month: December 2012, February 2013
