= Lee Carsley =

Footballer and coach (born 1974)

Lee Carsley MBE
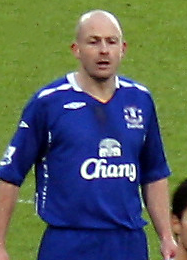
- Carsley playing for Everton in 2007

Personal information
- Full name: Lee Kevin Carsley
- Date of birth: 28 February 1974 (age 52)
- Place of birth: Birmingham, England
- Height: 1.77 m (5 ft 10 in)
- Position: Defensive midfielder

Team information
- Current team: England U21 (head coach)

Youth career
- 1992–1994: Derby County

Senior career*
Years	Team	Apps	(Gls)
1994–1999	Derby County	138	(5)
1999–2000	Blackburn Rovers	46	(10)
2000–2002	Coventry City	47	(4)
2002–2008	Everton	166	(12)
2008–2010	Birmingham City	48	(2)
2010–2011	Coventry City	25	(0)
Total		470	(33)

International career
1995	Republic of Ireland U21	1	(0)
1997	Republic of Ireland B	1	(0)
1997–2008	Republic of Ireland	40	(0)

Managerial career
- 2012: Coventry City (caretaker)
- 2013: Coventry City (caretaker)
- 2015: Brentford
- 2017: Birmingham City (caretaker)
- 2020–2021: England U20
- 2021–: England U21
- 2024: England (interim)
Medal record
Men's football
Representing England (as manager)
UEFA European Under-21 Championship
Winner	2023 Georgia–Romania
Winner	2025 Slovakia
- * Club domestic league appearances and goals

Lee Kevin Carsley MBE (born 28 February 1974) is a professional football coach and former player who is the head coach of the England national under-21 team.

In a playing career lasting 17 years, Carsley played as a midfielder in the Premier League and Football League with Derby County, Blackburn Rovers, Coventry City, Everton and Birmingham City. Born and raised in Birmingham, England, Carsley represented the Republic of Ireland at international level and was chosen for the 2002 FIFA World Cup.

After retiring from playing in 2011, Carsley entered coaching with Coventry City. He held youth roles with Coventry, Brentford, Manchester City and Birmingham City, serving each club (bar Manchester City) as interim first team manager. Carsley joined the England youth setup as a specialist coach in 2015, before being appointed head coach of England U20 in 2020 and then being promoted to England U21 in 2021 and leading them to back-to-back victories in the European Championship in 2023 and 2025.

== Club career ==
=== Derby County ===
A defensive midfielder, Carsley began his career with First Division club Derby County and made his debut in a 6–1 Anglo-Italian Cup group stage victory over Cesena on 6 September 1994. He went on to become a regular fixture in the team during the 1994–95 and 1995–96 seasons, making 37 appearances and scoring two goals in the latter campaign to help the Rams to a second-place finish and promotion to the Premiership. Carsley made 30 appearances during his first season in the top-flight as the club consolidated its position with a 12th-place finish. He remained at Pride Park until March 1999 and departed Derby having made 166 appearances and scored five goals for the club.

=== Blackburn Rovers ===
Carsley joined Premiership strugglers Blackburn Rovers in March 1999 for a £3.4 million fee. He made eight appearances in the final two months of the 1998–99 season and failed to taste victory before suffering relegation to the First Division. In the second-tier, Carsley was encouraged to play a more advanced midfield role by manager Brian Kidd and showed the best goalscoring form of his career, topping the club's chart with 11 goals, though Rovers could finish no better than 11th. Despite falling out of favour with new manager Graeme Souness and handing in a transfer request, Carsley played on into the 2000–01 season, before leaving the club in December 2000. Carsley made 55 appearances and scored 13 goals during just over 18 months at Ewood Park. Carsley recalled in 2013 that he enjoyed working under Brian Kidd and living in the town.

=== Coventry City ===
Carsley signed with struggling Premiership club Coventry City in December 2000 on a four-and-a-half-year contract for a fee believed to be £2.5 million. Despite being a near ever-present under Gordon Strachan, he could not prevent the Highfield Road club from suffering relegation to the second-tier for the first time in 34 years. Despite Coventry looking outside bets for a place in the promotion playoffs, Carsley left the club in March 2002, having made 52 appearances and scoring four goals.

=== Everton ===
Carsley signed for Premiership club Everton in February 2002 on a four-and-a-half-year deal for a £1.9 million fee. Despite manager Walter Smith departing the following month, his replacement David Moyes kept Carsley in the team and he made eight appearances in what remained of the 2001–02 season, scoring his first goal for the club with a first half equaliser in an eventual 4–3 defeat to Arsenal on the final day of the season. Carsley enjoyed mixed fortunes during his first two seasons at Everton, but 2004–05 saw him become an increasingly important player within the team. He was a regular starter in a 4–1–4–1 formation, sitting just in front of the defence and just behind the midfield. In December 2004, Carsley scored the winner in the 200th Merseyside derby between Everton and Liverpool, a strike which won him Everton's Goal of the Season award. The win took Everton temporarily to second place in the Premier League. He continued to perform well and Everton finished 4th, gaining entry to the third qualifying stage of the Champions League.

Four minutes from the end of the 2004–05 season, Carsley was stretchered off with a twisted knee during a 3–2 defeat to Bolton Wanderers (a game in which he scored). He was fit to resume pre-season training but strained medial ligaments in a pre-season friendly away to Fenerbahçe in late July 2005. He returned to the team for Everton's FA Cup fourth round replay versus Chelsea on 8 February 2006, replacing Leon Osman late in the 4–1 defeat. He made five further appearances during the 2005–06 season, before his season was ended after receiving a dubious straight red card for a foul on Didier Drogba in a league match versus Chelsea on 17 April. Carsley started every league game during the 2006–07 season and helped Everton to 6th place and UEFA Cup qualification. He signed a new one-year contract in May 2007 and was again an integral part of the team during the 2007–08 season, making 49 appearances and scoring one goal. Carsley turned down the offer of a new contract and departed Goodison Park at the end of the season, after making 199 appearances and scoring 13 goals during just over six years with Everton.

=== Birmingham City ===
Carsley signed for hometown Championship club Birmingham City in May 2008. With club captain Damien Johnson expected to be out of action for several months following a back operation, Carsley began the 2008–09 season as captain. He made 44 appearances and scored two goals to help the Blues to a second-place finish and promotion straight back to the Premier League. Carsley won the Players' and Junior Blues' Player of the Season awards. Carsley suffered an injury-hit 2009–10 season, making just nine appearances and scoring one goal. He departed St Andrew's at the end of the campaign and made 53 appearances and scored three goals during his time with the Blues.

=== Return to Coventry City ===
Carsley returned to former club Coventry City, then in the Championship, in July 2010, signing a one-year contract. He was appointed club captain by manager Aidy Boothroyd. Carsley made 25 appearances during the 2010–11 season and was released at the end of the campaign, which led to his retirement from professional football. During his two spells with Coventry City, Carsley made 79 appearances and scored seven goals.

=== Non-League career ===
In 2017, he joined historic Sunday league club Monica Star alongside former Premier League and international players, Darren Byfield, Paul Devlin and Lee Hendrie, winning all possible trophies in his first season.

== International career ==
=== U21 and 'B' ===
Carsley qualified for the Republic of Ireland national team through his grandmother, who was from Dunmanway, County Cork. He made his international debut at U21 level in a 3–1 1996 European U21 Championship qualifying defeat to Portugal U21 on 14 November 1995 and represented the B team in a match against the League of Ireland XI 18 months later.

=== Full ===
Carsley won his first cap at senior level in a 1–1 1998 World Cup qualifying draw with Romania on 11 October 1997 and played in Ireland's two playoff matches, which were lost 3–2 on aggregate to Belgium. He was a regular during Ireland's failed qualifying attempt for Euro 2000 and played in the 1–1 playoff first leg draw with Turkey on 13 November 1999. Despite having featured in only four matches in the previous 20 months and only one 2002 World Cup qualifier, Carsley was selected in Mick McCarthy's squad for the 2002 World Cup. He made one appearance in the tournament, as a late substitute for Mark Kinsella in a 3–0 group stage win over Saudi Arabia.

On 7 April 2004, Carsley declared that he would take a break from international football in order to focus on his family and winning his place back in the Everton team. In September 2005, Carsley announced that "as soon as I am playing again, I will be straight on the phone saying I want to be considered for the Ireland squad". He returned to international football with a start in a 1–1 Euro 2008 qualifying draw with the Czech Republic on 11 October 2006. From that point on, Carsley was a regular in Steve Staunton's selections, though Ireland failed to qualify for Euro 2008. Carsley's 40th and final international cap came in a 1–0 friendly defeat to Brazil at Croke Park on 6 February 2008.

== Coaching career and youth roles ==
=== Coventry City ===
Carsley worked on his coaching badges while a player at Everton and in July 2011, Carsley was appointed coach of Coventry City's U18 team. He led them to runners-up spot in the Premier Academy League and was promoted to coach the Development Squad and assist with the club's first team in May 2012. He left the club in July 2013.

=== Sheffield United ===
In July 2013, Carsley joined League One club Sheffield United as "Assistant to the Manager-Technical", working alongside his former Everton teammate David Weir, who had taken charge of the Bramall Lane club a month earlier. After winning the first game of the season 2–1 against Notts County, the Blades failed to win any of their next 12 matches and both Carsley and Weir were sacked on 11 October 2013.

=== England age-groups ===
In September 2015, Carsley began coaching the England U19 team under his former Coventry City manager Aidy Boothroyd. In 2016, Carsley was revealed to be a full-time "out of possession" coach for all the England teams between U15 and U21 level. On 29 August 2017, it was announced that Carsley had been named as the England U21 team's part-time specialist national coach. In September 2020, he became the Professional Development Phase lead, which encompasses the U18, U19 and U20 age-groups. Carsley served in the role until July 2021.

=== Manchester City Academy ===
On 29 August 2016, Carsley was appointed as Manchester City U18 manager in August 2016. He had a successful 2016–17 season, managing the team to a top place finish in the North Division of the Professional U18 Development League 1 and to the 2017 FA Youth Cup Final. Carsley left the club in June 2017.

== Managerial career ==
=== Coventry City ===
Upon the sacking of manager Andy Thorn on 26 August 2012, Carsley and Richard Shaw took over as caretaker managers, before the appointment of Mark Robins on 19 September. Later that season, Carsley took sole caretaker charge when Robins left the club on 14 February 2013, until Steven Pressley's appointment on 8 March.

=== Brentford ===
Carsley was appointed Development Squad manager at Championship club Brentford in mid-October 2014, replacing Jon De Souza. The move saw Carsley reunite with David Weir, then-first team assistant manager at Griffin Park and he managed the Development Squad to a third-from-bottom finish in the Professional Development League 2 South during the 2014–15 season.

On 28 September 2015, Carsley was promoted to head coach of the first team following the departure of Marinus Dijkhuizen, with his former Derby County and Coventry City teammate Paul Williams promoted from logistics manager to assistant head coach. He accepted a deal until the end of the 2015–16 season. Having lost his first two matches in charge, an upturn in form (after being afforded time to work with the squad during an international break) saw Carsley win the October 2015 Championship Manager of the Month award for leading the Bees to four wins from five matches. With incoming head coach Dean Smith watching from the stands, Carsley's tenure ended with a 1–1 draw away to Bolton Wanderers on 30 November. He remained at Griffin Park to assist Smith's integration into the club, before departing on 10 December.

=== Birmingham City ===
On 23 June 2017, Carsley returned to Birmingham City to take over the role of Head Professional Development Coach. Following the sacking of manager Harry Redknapp on 16 September 2017, Carsley was named caretaker manager of the first team. He won, drew and lost his three matches in charge, before moving into the role of assistant to new manager Steve Cotterill on 29 September. He followed Cotterill out of the club after the latter's sacking in March 2018.

=== England U20 ===
In September 2020, Carsley was announced as head coach of England U20. He managed two matches during the 2020–21 season, a 2–0 friendly win over Wales U20 and a 3–1 hybrid friendly defeat to Aston Villa U20. Carsley remained in the role until July 2021.

=== England U21 ===
On 27 July 2021, Carsley was appointed head coach of England U21. On 8 July 2023, his team won the European Under-21 Championship by beating Spain 1–0 in the final, their first title in the competition since 1984. In June 2025, he extended his contract until 2027.

=== England national team ===
On 9 August 2024, Carsley was appointed interim head coach of England men's national football team after Gareth Southgate departed the role. He said "As I am very familiar with the players and the cycle of international football, it makes sense for me to guide the team while the FA continues the process to recruit a new manager". During his tenure as interim head coach, he gave senior England debuts to Noni Madueke, Tino Livramento, Curtis Jones, Morgan Rogers, Morgan Gibbs-White, Angel Gomes, Taylor Harwood-Bellis and Lewis Hall.

== Personal life ==
Carsley grew up in Sheldon in east Birmingham and attended Cockshut Hill Secondary School in nearby Yardley. Carsley and his wife Louisa live in Kenilworth with their three children. His elder son Callum is a footballer, playing as a defender for Nuneaton Town, and as of 2024 is the assistant technical director at Birmingham City. Carsley is patron of the Solihull Down Syndrome Support Group, with which the Carsleys became actively involved because their second son has the condition.

== Career statistics ==
=== Player ===
Appearances and goals by club, season and competition
Club	Season	League			FA Cup		League Cup		Other		Total	
Club	Season	Division	Apps	Goals	Apps	Goals	Apps	Goals	Apps	Goals	Apps	Goals
Derby County	1994–95	First Division	23	2	1	0	4	0	3 (Note: Appearances in Anglo-Italian Cup)	0	31	2
Derby County	1995–96	First Division	35	1	0	0	2	0	—		37	1
Derby County	1996–97	Premier League	24	0	4	0	2	0	—		30	0
Derby County	1997–98	Premier League	34	1	2	0	2	0	—		38	1
Derby County	1998–99	Premier League	22	1	5	0	3	0	—		30	1
Derby County	Total		138	5	12	0	13	0	3	0	166	5
Blackburn Rovers	1998–99	Premier League	8	0	—		—		—		8	0
Blackburn Rovers	1999–2000	First Division	30	10	4	1	0	0	—		34	11
Blackburn Rovers	2000–01	First Division	8	0	—		4	1	—		12	1
Blackburn Rovers	Total		46	10	4	1	4	1	—		54	12
Coventry City	2000–01	Premier League	21	2	2	0	—		—		23	2
Coventry City	2001–02	First Division	26	2	1	0	2	1	—		29	3
Coventry City	Total		47	4	3	0	2	1	—		52	5
Everton	2001–02	Premier League	8	1	—		—		—		8	1
Everton	2002–03	Premier League	24	3	1	0	2	0	—		27	3
Everton	2003–04	Premier League	21	2	2	0	2	0	—		25	2
Everton	2004–05	Premier League	36	4	3	0	2	1	—		41	5
Everton	2005–06	Premier League	5	0	1	0	0	0	0	0	6	0
Everton	2006–07	Premier League	38	1	1	0	3	0	—		42	1
Everton	2007–08	Premier League	34	1	1	0	5	0	9 (Note: Appearances in UEFA Cup)	0	49	1
Everton	Total		166	12	9	0	14	1	9	0	198	13
Birmingham City	2008–09	Championship	41	2	1	0	2	0	—		44	2
Birmingham City	2009–10	Premier League	7	0	1	0	1	1	—		9	1
Birmingham City	Total		48	2	2	0	3	1	—		53	3
Coventry City	2010–11	Championship	25	0	0	0	0	0	—		25	0
Career total			470	33	30	1	36	4	12	0	548	38

=== Manager ===
As of match played 16 November 2026

Managerial record by team and tenure
Team	From	To	Record					Ref
Team	From	To	G	W	D	L	Win %	Ref
Coventry City (caretaker)	26 August 2012	19 September 2012	6	1	1	4	16.67	
Coventry City (caretaker)	14 February 2013	8 March 2013	5	3	0	2	60.00	
Brentford	28 September 2015	30 November 2015	10	5	2	3	50.00	
Birmingham City (caretaker)	16 September 2017	2 October 2017 (Note: Carsley's last match in charge was the defeat on 30 September. The appointment of Steve Cotterill took effect after that match but was announced before it, and the Soccerbase website does not attribute the defeat to Carsley.)	3	1	1	1	33.33	
England U20	24 September 2020	27 July 2021	2	1	0	1	50.00	
England U21	27 July 2021	Present	49	36	4	9	73.47	
England (interim)	9 August 2024	31 December 2024	6	5	0	1	83.33	
Total			81	52	8	21	64.20	

== Honours ==
=== Player ===
Derby County

- Football League First Division second-place promotion: 1995–96

Birmingham City

- Football League Championship second-place promotion: 2008–09

Individual

- Birmingham City Players' Player of the Year: 2008–09

=== Manager ===
England U21

- UEFA European Under-21 Championship: 2023, 2025

Individual

- Football League Championship Manager of the Month: October 2015

== See also ==
- List of Republic of Ireland international footballers born outside the Republic of Ireland
