= Paulo Wanchope =

Costa Rican footballer (born 1976)

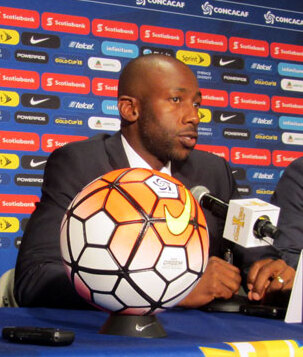
- Wanchope in 2015

Personal information
- Full name: Paulo César Wanchope Watson
- Date of birth: 31 July 1976 (age 50)
- Place of birth: Heredia, Costa Rica
- Height: 1.89 m (6 ft 2 in)
- Position: Striker

Senior career*
Years	Team	Apps	(Gls)
1993–1997	Herediano	14	(20)
1997–1999	Derby County	72	(23)
1999–2000	West Ham United	35	(12)
2000–2004	Manchester City	64	(27)
2004–2005	Málaga	25	(6)
2005	Al-Gharafa	6	(1)
2006	Herediano	10	(3)
2006	Rosario Central	14	(5)
2007	FC Tokyo	11	(3)
2007	Chicago Fire	12	(2)
Total		264	(102)

International career
- Costa Rica U20
1996–2008	Costa Rica	73	(44)

Managerial career
- 2008–2009: Herediano
- 2010–2011: Uruguay Coronado
- 2010–2014: Costa Rica (assistant)
- 2014–2015: Costa Rica
- 2018: Cartaginés
- 2018: Herediano
- 2021: Pérez Zeledón
- 2022–2023: Cartaginés
- 2024–2025: Costa Rica (assistant)
- 2025: Deportivo Saprissa
- * Club domestic league appearances and goals

Paulo César Wanchope Watson (Spanish pronunciation: [ˈpawlo wanˈtʃope]; born 31 July 1976), is a Costa Rican football coach and former professional footballer who last coached Deportivo Saprissa.

As a player he was a striker who notably played in the Premier League for Derby County, West Ham United and Manchester City. He also had spells in La Liga and Major League Soccer for Málaga and Chicago Fire as well as Herediano, Al-Gharafa, Rosario Central and FC Tokyo. He was capped 73 times by Costa Rica, scoring 45 goals. Wanchope is the second most prolific goalscorer in the history of the Costa Rica national football team, behind Rolando Fonseca, with 45 goals in 73 international matches. Having scored against Brazil in 2002 and a brace against Germany in 2006, Wanchope is the top goalscorer for Costa Rica in the FIFA World Cup, a record he shares with Rónald Gómez.

As he is the former head coach of the Costa Rica national football team with a spell in charge between 2014 and 2015. He has also managed Herediano, Uruguay Coronado, CS Cartaginés and Pérez Zeledón.

== Club career ==
=== Derby County ===
Born in Heredia, Wanchope began his career with Herediano moving to England to play with Derby County along with fellow Costa Rican Mauricio Solís on 27 March 1997. He cost Derby £600,000.

Wanchope marked his debut for Derby on 5 April 1997 with a memorable goal against Manchester United at Old Trafford, beating four United players before slotting past Peter Schmeichel during a 3–2 win – the goal was later voted the greatest in the club's history by the Derby fans as part of the club's 125th Anniversary Celebrations.

He scored 13 league goals in 1997–98 as Derby finished ninth – their highest finish since 1989 – and helped them go one better in 1998–99 when his nine goals that season helped the Rams finish eighth.

After scoring 28 goals in 83 games within two seasons for Derby, Wanchope was sold to West Ham United for £3.5 million on 16 July 1999.

=== West Ham United ===
Wanchope made his debut for West Ham on 28 July 1999, at Upton Park, against Heerenveen in the Intertoto Cup. His first West Ham goal came on 4 August 1999 in the away leg of the same tie. He scored 15 goals in 47 appearances in all competitions; his final game coming on 14 May 2000, at home to Leeds United. During his one year at Upton Park Wanchope formed a deadly partnership with Paolo Di Canio, the two scored a combined 31 league goals in the 1999–2000 season, and West Ham finished 9th in the Premier League, putting them in the top nine for the third consecutive season. He was eventually sold to Manchester City at the start of the 2000–01 season, following the arrivals of Davor Šuker and Frédéric Kanouté, for a fee of £3.65million.

=== Manchester City ===
On 23 August 2000 he scored a hat-trick in a 4–2 win against Sunderland. Wanchope earned a starting position at Manchester City, but was unable to help them avoid immediate relegation back to Division One at the end of the 2000–01 season, despite scoring nine league goals.

The following season was a mixed one for Wanchope. Despite missing large chunks of it through injury, he still managed 12 goals in just 15 games and often showed his best form. After City's return to the top flight as Division One champions he played almost no part, with injury once again keeping him on the sidelines – he missed the entire 2002–03 season.

However, he returned to play a vital part at the end of 2003–04 and scored some vital goals to help avoid relegation, including the winning goal against Newcastle United, which effectively made City safe. He managed six goals from 22 league games that campaign.

=== Post-Premier League ===
In August 2004, Wanchope was sold to Málaga CF of the Spanish La Liga for £500,000. He played 25 games for the club, scoring six goals.

In 2005, ESPN declared Wanchope's goal against Numancia the best of the entire 2004–05 Spanish First Division. In 2006, following the World Cup in Germany and short but successful stints with Al-Gharafa in Qatar and Herediano in his native Costa Rica, he signed with Argentine club Rosario Central, scoring five goals in 14 games.

On 29 December 2006, J1 League club FC Tokyo announced the acquisition of Wanchope on a transfer from Rosario Central. Along with local prospect Sota Hirayama, Wanchope allowed FC Tokyo to utilise a pair of large (190 cm+) strikers. He was released by FC Tokyo and subsequently signed a one-year deal with MLS team Chicago Fire.

=== Retirement ===
On 16 November 2007, after a 13-year career in football, Wanchope decided to put an end to his career, primarily based on how his old knee injury was affecting his performance on the field, the same injury that made him lose large parts of his career with Manchester City, making him unable to reach his best physical shape, an argument that was commonly criticized by the press during recent years in every club he played for. At his retirement press conference he manifested his interest in becoming a professional coach, looking forward to accomplishing it in England.

== International career ==
He was a member of Costa Rica's youth national teams, playing in the 1995 FIFA World Youth Championship finals in Qatar.

Wanchope would become hugely important to the senior Costa Rica national team, after making his debut in an October 1996 friendly match against Venezuela and playing for the team in the 2002 FIFA World Cup and several Gold Cups. On 8 October 2005, Wanchope became the all-time leading goal scorer for Los Ticos when he scored the first goal in a home win over the USA in the qualifying match that sent Los Ticos to the 2006 FIFA World Cup. Wanchope has twenty plus World Cup qualifier goals to his name.

On 9 June 2006, he scored twice in the opening game of the 2006 World Cup, a 4–2 loss to Germany. These two goals made Wanchope the inaugural Costa Rican to score twice in one World Cup match, and put him alongside Rónald Gómez as the sole Costa Ricans ever to score more than one World Cup goal. After the defeat to Germany, Costa Rica were defeated by both Ecuador and Poland. Thus Costa Rica finished last in their group and failed to qualify for the second round. Wanchope played his last game for his country in January 2008 against Sweden. He played 25 minutes before being substituted.

== Managerial career ==
He managed Herediano from 2008 to 2009. He resigned citing that the team's performance was low, and that he wanted to further his studies in England. Having left Herediano, he expressed his dissatisfaction with the administration of the club.

Wanchope became an assistant to the Costa Rica national team coach, Jorge Luis Pinto. Upon Pinto's departure after the 2014 FIFA World Cup, Wanchope took over as interim national team coach.

In September 2014, he won the Copa Centroamericana with the Costa Rica national football team. On 31 January 2015, he was officially named as national team coach.

On 12 August 2015, Wanchope resigned as manager of Costa Rica's national team following a post-match brawl with a steward.

== Personal life ==
Wanchope is a son of Costa Rican former international striker Vicente Wanchope and Patricia Watson and both his brothers, Javier and Carlos, also played for the national team. He is married to Brenda Carballo and they have a son and daughter. He is of Jamaican descent.

== Career statistics ==
=== Club ===
Appearances and goals by club, season and competition
Club	Season	League			National cup (Note: Includes FA Cup)		League cup (Note: Includes Football League Cup, J.League Cup)		Continental		Total	
Club	Season	Division	Apps	Goals	Apps	Goals	Apps	Goals	Apps	Goals	Apps	Goals
Derby County	1996–97	Premier League	5	1	0	0	0	0	—		5	1
Derby County	1997–98	Premier League	32	13	2	0	4	4	—		38	17
Derby County	1998–99	Premier League	35	9	2	0	3	1	—		40	10
Derby County	Total		72	23	4	0	7	5	0	0	83	28
West Ham United	1999–2000	Premier League	35	12	1	0	3	0	8 (Note: Four appearances and two goals in UEFA Intertoto Cup, four appearances and one goal in UEFA Cup)	3	47	15
Manchester City	2000–01	Premier League	27	9	1	0	3	1	—		31	10
Manchester City	2001–02	First Division	15	12	2	1	1	0	—		18	13
Manchester City	2002–03	Premier League	0	0	0	0	0	0	—		0	0
Manchester City	2003–04	Premier League	22	6	0	0	0	0	4 (Note: Appearances in UEFA Cup)	0	26	6
Manchester City	Total		64	27	3	1	4	1	4	0	75	29
Málaga	2004–05	La Liga	25	6	0	0	—		—		25	6
Al-Gharafa	2005–06	Qatar Stars League	6	1					—		6	1
Herediano	2005–06	Liga FPD	10	3	—		—		—		10	3
Rosario Central	2006–07	Primera División	14	5			—		—		14	5
FC Tokyo	2007	J1 League	12	2	—		4	1	—		16	3
Chicago Fire	2007	Major League Soccer	12	2	0	0	1	0	—		13	2
Career total			250	81	8	1	19	7	12	3	289	92

=== International ===
Appearances and goals by national team and year
National team	Year	Apps	Goals
Costa Rica	1996	7	3
Costa Rica	1997	7	6
Costa Rica	1998	2	4
Costa Rica	1999	5	2
Costa Rica	2000	12	6
Costa Rica	2001	11	10
Costa Rica	2002	7	3
Costa Rica	2003	1	0
Costa Rica	2004	6	5
Costa Rica	2005	9	3
Costa Rica	2006	5	2
Costa Rica	2007	0	0
Costa Rica	2008	1	0
Total		73	44

Scores and results list Costa Rica's goal tally first, score column indicates score after each Wanchope goal.

List of international goals scored by Paulo Wanchope
No.	Date	Venue	Opponent	Score	Result	Competition	Ref.
1	1 December 1996	Estadio Ricardo Saprissa Aymá, San Juan de Tibás, Costa Rica	United States	1–0	2–1	1998 FIFA World Cup qualification	
2	21 December 1996	Estadio José Rafael Fello Meza Ivankovich, Cartago, Costa Rica	Trinidad and Tobago	1–1	2–1	1998 FIFA World Cup qualification	
3	21 December 1996	Estadio José Rafael Fello Meza Ivankovich, Cartago, Costa Rica	Trinidad and Tobago	2–1	2–1	1998 FIFA World Cup qualification	
4	9 March 1997	Estadio Ricardo Saprissa Aymá, San Juan de Tibás, Costa Rica	Cameroon	1–0	5–0	Friendly	
5	9 March 1997	Estadio Ricardo Saprissa Aymá, San Juan de Tibás, Costa Rica	Cameroon	2–0	5–0	Friendly	
6	9 March 1997	Estadio Ricardo Saprissa Aymá, San Juan de Tibás, Costa Rica	Cameroon	3–0	5–0	Friendly	
7	11 May 1997	Estadio Ricardo Saprissa Aymá, San Juan de Tibás, Costa Rica	Jamaica	1–0	3–1	1998 FIFA World Cup qualification	
8	11 May 1997	Estadio Ricardo Saprissa Aymá, San Juan de Tibás, Costa Rica	Jamaica	2–1	3–1	1998 FIFA World Cup qualification	
9	9 November 1997	Estadio Azteca, Mexico City, Mexico	Mexico	3–3	3–3	1998 FIFA World Cup qualification	
10	4 February 1998	Oakland Coliseum, Oakland, California	Cuba	2–0	7–2	1998 CONCACAF Gold Cup	
11	4 February 1998	Oakland Coliseum, Oakland, California	Cuba	4–0	7–2	1998 CONCACAF Gold Cup	
12	4 February 1998	Oakland Coliseum, Oakland, California	Cuba	6–1	7–2	1998 CONCACAF Gold Cup	
13	4 February 1998	Oakland Coliseum, Oakland, California	Cuba	7–1	7–2	1998 CONCACAF Gold Cup	
14	17 March 1999	Estadio Nacional, San José, Costa Rica	Belize	1–0	7–0	1999 UNCAF Nations Cup	
15	28 March 1999	Estadio Nacional, San José, Costa Rica	El Salvador	4–0	4–0	1999 UNCAF Nations Cup	
16	17 February 2000	Los Angeles Memorial Coliseum, Los Angeles, United States	South Korea	1–1	2–2	2000 CONCACAF Gold Cup	
17	1 July 2000	Estadio Alejandro Morera Soto, Alajuela, Costa Rica	Panama	5–1	5–1	Friendly	
18	9 July 2000	Estadio Ricardo Saprissa Aymá, San Juan de Tibás, Costa Rica	Saint Vincent and the Grenadines	1–0	7–1	Friendly	
19	9 July 2000	Estadio Ricardo Saprissa Aymá, San Juan de Tibás, Costa Rica	Saint Vincent and the Grenadines	5–1	7–1	Friendly	
20	15 August 2000	Estadio Alejandro Morera Soto, Alajuela, Costa Rica	Guatemala	1–0	2–1	2002 FIFA World Cup qualification	
21	15 August 2000	Estadio Alejandro Morera Soto, Alajuela, Costa Rica	Guatemala	2–0	2–1	2002 FIFA World Cup qualification	
22	6 January 2001	Miami Orange Bowl, Miami, United States	Guatemala	1–1	5–2	2002 FIFA World Cup qualification	
23	28 March 2001	Estadio Alejandro Morera Soto, Alajuela, Costa Rica	Trinidad and Tobago	2–0	3–0	2002 FIFA World Cup qualification	
24	28 March 2001	Estadio Alejandro Morera Soto, Alajuela, Costa Rica	Trinidad and Tobago	3–0	3–0	2002 FIFA World Cup qualification	
25	20 June 2001	Estadio Alejandro Morera Soto, Alajuela, Costa Rica	Jamaica	2–1	2–1	2002 FIFA World Cup qualification	
26	1 July 2001	Estadio Nacional Chelato Uclés, Tegucigalpa, Honduras	Honduras	1–0	3–2	2002 FIFA World Cup qualification	
27	13 July 2001	Estadio Atanasio Girardot, Medellín, Colombia	Honduras	1–0	1–0	2001 Copa América	
28	16 July 2001	Estadio Atanasio Girardot, Medellín, Colombia	Uruguay	1–0	1–1	2001 Copa América	
29	19 July 2001	Estadio Atanasio Girardot, Medellín, Colombia	Bolivia	1–0	4–0	2001 Copa América	
30	19 July 2001	Estadio Atanasio Girardot, Medellín, Colombia	Bolivia	3–0	4–0	2001 Copa América	
31	22 July 2001	Estadio Centenario, Armenia, Colombia	Uruguay	1–0	1–2	2001 Copa América	
32	30 January 2002	Rose Bowl, Pasadena, United States	South Korea	2–0	3–1	2002 CONCACAF Gold Cup	
33	30 January 2002	Rose Bowl, Pasadena, United States	South Korea	3–1	3–1	2002 CONCACAF Gold Cup	
34	13 June 2002	Suwon World Cup Stadium, Suwon, South Korea	Brazil	1–3	2–5	2002 FIFA World Cup	
35	8 September 2004	Estadio Ricardo Saprissa Aymá, San Juan de Tibás, Costa Rica	Canada	1–0	1–0	2006 FIFA World Cup qualification	
36	9 October 2004	Estadio Ricardo Saprissa Aymá, San Juan de Tibás, Costa Rica	Guatemala	2–0	5–0	2006 FIFA World Cup qualification	
37	9 October 2004	Estadio Ricardo Saprissa Aymá, San Juan de Tibás, Costa Rica	Guatemala	3–0	5–0	2006 FIFA World Cup qualification	
38	9 October 2004	Estadio Ricardo Saprissa Aymá, San Juan de Tibás, Costa Rica	Guatemala	4–0	5–0	2006 FIFA World Cup qualification	
39	13 October 2004	Swangard Stadium, Burnaby, Canada	Canada	1–1	3–1	2006 FIFA World Cup qualification	
40	9 February 2005	Estadio Ricardo Saprissa Aymá, San Juan de Tibás, Costa Rica	Mexico	1–2	1–2	2006 FIFA World Cup qualification	
41	8 June 2005	Estadio Ricardo Saprissa Aymá, San Juan de Tibás, Costa Rica	Guatemala	3–2	3–2	2006 FIFA World Cup qualification	
42	8 October 2005	Estadio Ricardo Saprissa Aymá, San Juan de Tibás, Costa Rica	United States	1–0	3–0	2006 FIFA World Cup qualification	
43	9 June 2006	Allianz Arena, Munich, Germany	Germany	1–1	2–4	2006 FIFA World Cup	
44	9 June 2006	Allianz Arena, Munich, Germany	Germany	2–3	2–4	2006 FIFA World Cup	

=== Managerial ===
As of match played 11 January 2024

Managerial record by team and tenure
Team	Nat	From	To	Record							
Team	Nat	From	To	G	W	D	L	GF	GA	GD	Win %
Herediano	(Costa Rica)	1 April 2008	10 March 2009	44	19	13	12	60	47	+13	43.18
Costa Rica	(Costa Rica)	25 July 2014	12 August 2015	15	4	7	4	24	21	+3	26.67
C.S. Cartaginés	(Costa Rica)	1 July 2018	14 September 2018	10	1	6	3	11	13	−2	10.00
Herediano	(Costa Rica)	14 September 2018	21 October 2018	10	4	1	5	10	12	−2	40.00
Pérez Zeledón	(Costa Rica)	2 February 2021	18 August 2021	23	5	12	6	22	30	−8	21.74
C.S. Cartaginés	(Costa Rica)	26 October 2022	6 October 2023	43	22	8	13	74	60	+14	51.16
Total				145	55	47	43	201	183	+18	37.93

== Honours ==
=== Player ===
West Ham United

- UEFA Intertoto Cup: 1999

Manchester City

- Football League First Division: 2001–02

Costa Rica

- UNCAF Nations Cup: 1999

Individual awards

- Premier League Player of the Month: October 1997
- CONCACAF Gold Cup Best XI: 1998

=== Manager ===
Costa Rica

- Copa Centroamericana: 2014

Cartaginés

- Costa Rican Cup: 2022
