= Jimmy Neil =

English footballer

Personal information
- Full name: James Neil
- Date of birth: 28 February 1976 (age 50)
- Place of birth: Bury St Edmunds, England
- Position: Left back

Senior career*
Years	Team	Apps	(Gls)
1994–1997	Grimsby Town	2	(0)
1996	→ Grantham (loan)		
1997–1999	Scunthorpe United	7	(0)
1999–?	Grantham Town		
- * Club domestic league appearances and goals

James Neil (born 28 February 1976) is an English former professional footballer who played in the English Football League between 1994 and 1999, and played left back. . He could also be used at right back. During his career he played for Grimsby Town, Scunthorpe United and Grantham Town.

== Career ==
=== Grimsby Town ===
Neil, a native of the Suffolk town of Bury St Edmunds started his professional football career as a junior at Grimsby Town. He was promoted to the first team squad at the start of the 1994–1995 season. He made his senior debut while on loan for non league outfit Grantham in 1996. However, he did not make his first team debut for Grimsby until 22 March 1997, when he came on as a 74th-minute substitute for Gary Childs in a 0–0 draw with Tranmere Rovers.

=== Scunthorpe United ===
Following Grimsby's relegation from the First Division, Neil was released by manager Alan Buckley. And as many former Grimsby players in the nineties such as Paul Harsley and Craig Shakespeare he found a home at the clubs smaller local rivals Scunthorpe United. He linked up with former Grimsby manager Brian Laws while at Glanford Park and was to make a total of 8 appearances in total during the 1997-1998 campaign. His las game being a 1–0 defeat to Chester City on 28 December 1997. Neil remained a part of the Scunthorpe squad for the 1998-1999 campaign but would not feature in any games that season. With his contract expired he left the club in the summer of 1999.

=== Grantham Town ===
In accordance to this he signed for non league club Grantham Town who had been formed from the club he had previously played for while at Grimsby.
