= Robin van der Laan =

Dutch footballer (born 1968)

Personal information
- Full name: Robertus Petrus van der Laan
- Date of birth: 5 September 1968 (age 58)
- Place of birth: Schiedam, South Holland, Netherlands
- Height: 6 ft 0 in (1.83 m)
- Positions: Midfielder; forward

Senior career*
Years	Team	Apps	(Gls)
1987–1990	SVV	59	(13)
1990–1991	FC Wageningen	27	(3)
1991–1995	Port Vale	176	(24)
1995–1998	Derby County	65	(8)
1996	→ Wolverhampton Wanderers (loan)	7	(0)
1998–2001	Barnsley	67	(5)
Total		401	(53)

Managerial career
- 2018–2023: Newcastle Town
- * Club domestic league appearances and goals

Robertus Petrus van der Laan (born 5 September 1968) is a Dutch former football player and manager.

He began his playing career in his native Netherlands with Eerste Divisie club Schiedamse Voetbal Vereniging in 1987 before moving on to Wageningen in 1990. In 1991, he moved to England to play for Port Vale, where after four seasons as one of the club's key players, he was sold to Derby County. He won the Football League Trophy with Vale in 1993, and won promotion out of the Second Division in 1993–94. He also won promotion out of the First Division with Derby in 1995–96. In 1998, he transferred to Barnsley, where he saw out his professional playing career until his retirement due to injury in 2001. He made 315 appearances in a ten-year career in the English Football League.

As a coach, he directed his own football school in Canada and was a senior coach for Manchester United Soccer Schools before he was appointed manager of Newcastle Town in February 2018. He stayed in the role for five years.

== Playing career ==
=== Netherlands ===
Van der Laan started his career at Eerste Divisie side Schiedamse Voetbal Vereniging in 1987. The club finished in mid-table in 1987–88 and 1988–89, before winning promotion to the Eredivisie as 1989–90 Eerste Divisie champions. However, he remained in the Dutch second tier as he switched to Wageningen midway through the 1989–90 season. In four years in the Netherlands, he played 59 games for SVV and 27 for Wageningen. He decided to leave his home country after picking up a 14-match ban from the Dutch leagues.

=== Port Vale ===
He was signed by English Second Division side Port Vale in February 1991 for a fee of £80,000 after impressing on trial. Initially signed as a striker, manager John Rudge converted him into a bustling, hard-tackling, goalscoring midfielder. Instantly recognisable for his mane of long blonde hair, Van der Laan soon became a popular figure with the Vale fans, his bustling style and midfield engine enabled him to settle into the English game very quickly, as he hit four goals in 18 games in 1990–91.

He made 49 appearances in 1991–92, scoring six goals, including a strike in front of the Kop in a 2–2 League Cup draw with Liverpool. Despite his contribution, Vale were relegated, though due to the creation of the Premier League, the Third Division became the Second Division. He made 53 appearances in 1992–93, scoring ten goals, helping the "Valiants" to both the Football League Trophy final and the play-off final. Vale beat Stockport County 2–1 in the cup final at Wembley, but lost 3–0 to West Bromwich Albion in the play-off final. However, he sometimes failed to make the starting eleven due to the form of central midfield rivals Andy Porter, Ian Taylor and Paul Kerr, and submitted a transfer request in February 1993 to find first-team football elsewhere.

Vale went on to win promotion into the First Division in 1993–94, following a second-place finish. He was again a key player at Vale Park in 1994–95, as the club retained their second-tier status. However, his good looks and popularity with the Vale fans saw him targeted by the more thuggish element of rivals Stoke City. He was punched in the face whilst inside a pizza and kebab house in Newcastle-under-Lyme on 18 June 1995.

=== Derby County ===
In the summer of 1995, Van der Laan was sold to Derby County for a fee of £475,000 plus Lee Mills. He was made captain by manager Jim Smith and was an influential member of the team. He scored the goal which sealed promotion to the Premier League in 1996 – this made him a permanent fan favourite. He made 21 appearances for the "Rams" in 1996–97, and also spent October and November on loan at First Division Wolverhampton Wanderers, playing seven games. Injury limited him to 13 appearances in 1997–98, his final season at Pride Park.

=== Barnsley ===
Van der Laan signed for Barnsley in summer 1998 for a fee of £325,000. He played twenty games for the First Division club in 1998–99, scoring twice. He made 37 appearances in 1999–2000, as the "Tykes" reached the play-offs, only to lose 4–2 to Ipswich Town in the final. He played 22 games in 2000–01 before a recurring knee injury he picked up in December 2000 forced him to retire from professional football in March 2001, at the age of 32. He later played for Newcastle Town, after coming out of retirement in September 2003.

== Style of play ==
Van der Laan spent most of his career as a box-to-box midfielder, having spent his early days as a forward. He was an excellent set piece taker and had good hard tackling, precision passing and sharp shooting abilities. A brave and aggressive player, he was well suited to the English game.

== Coaching career ==
Van der Laan worked as the Head International Coach for Manchester United Soccer Schools. He set up The Robin van der Laan Soccer School and Academy in Canada. He was appointed assistant manager at Newcastle Town in May 2014. He was taken ill whilst coaching for Manchester United in Saudi Arabia in May 2016 and underwent heart surgery.

On 26 February 2018, Van der Laan was appointed as manager at Newcastle Town, who were then fifth-bottom of the Northern Premier League Division One South. The "Castle" finished third-bottom at the end of the 2017–18 season, then 15th in the Division One West in 2018–19 and were 17th in the Division One South-East by the time the 2019–20 season was abandoned due to the COVID-19 pandemic in England. The 2020–21 season was also abandoned. Newcastle finished 16th and 15th in the Northern Premier League Division One West in the 2021–22 and 2022–23 seasons. He resigned as manager in the summer of 2023, though he remained as a director at the club.

== Personal life ==
His son, Tommy, played non-League football for Newcastle Town.

== Career statistics ==
Appearances and goals by club, season and competition
Club	Season	League			FA Cup		Other		Total	
Club	Season	Division	Apps	Goals	Apps	Goals	Apps	Goals	Apps	Goals
SVV	1987–88	Eerste Divisie	18	1					18	1
SVV	1988–89	Eerste Divisie	26	6					26	6
SVV	1989–90	Eerste Divisie	15	6					15	6
SVV	Total		59	13	0	0	0	0	59	13
FC Wageningen	1989–90	Eerste Divisie	17	2					17	2
FC Wageningen	1990–91	Eerste Divisie	10	1					10	1
FC Wageningen	Total		27	3	0	0	0	0	27	3
Port Vale	1990–91	Second Division	18	4	0	0	0	0	18	4
Port Vale	1991–92	Second Division	43	5	1	0	5	1	49	6
Port Vale	1992–93	Second Division	38	6	2	1	10	1	50	8
Port Vale	1993–94	Second Division	33	4	5	0	5	0	43	4
Port Vale	1994–95	First Division	44	5	2	0	4	0	50	5
Port Vale	Total		176	24	10	1	24	2	210	27
Derby County	1995–96	First Division	39	6	1	0	3	0	43	6
Derby County	1996–97	Premier League	16	2	3	3	2	0	21	5
Derby County	1997–98	Premier League	10	0	0	0	3	0	13	0
Derby County	Total		65	8	4	3	8	0	77	11
Wolverhampton Wanderers (loan)	1996–97	First Division	7	0	0	0	0	0	7	0
Barnsley	1998–99	First Division	17	1	1	0	2	1	20	2
Barnsley	1999–2000	First Division	32	3	0	0	5	2	37	5
Barnsley	2000–01	First Division	18	1	0	0	5	1	23	2
Barnsley	Total		67	5	1	0	12	4	80	9
Career total			401	53	15	4	44	6	460	63

== Honours ==
Port Vale

- Football League Trophy: 1992–93
- Football League Second Division second-place promotion: 1993–94

Derby County

- Football League First Division second-place promotion: 1995–96
