= 1989–90 Aldershot F.C. season =

Aldershot
1989–90 season
- Stadium: Recreation Ground
- Football League Fourth Division: 22nd
- FA Cup: First round
- League Cup: Second round
- EFL Trophy: First round
Home colours	Away colours	Third colours

The 1989–90 season was Aldershot's 63rd year in existence and 1st year in Football League Fourth Division after getting relegated from 1988–89 Third Division.

== Fourth Division Results ==
=== FA Cup ===
17 November 1989 First round	Aldershot	0–1	Cambridge United	Aldershot
		Report		Stadium: Recreation Park

=== League Cup ===
23 August 1989 First round 1st leg	Peterborough United	2–0	Aldershot	Peterborough
		Report		Stadium: London Road Stadium; Attendance: 3,397

29 August 1989 First round 2nd leg	Aldershot	6–2 (6–4 agg.)	Peterborough United	Aldershot
		Report		Stadium: Recreation Park; Attendance: 1,587

20 September 1989 Second round 1st leg	Sheffield Wednesday	0–0	Aldershot	Sheffield
		Report		Stadium: Hillsborough Stadium; Attendance: 9,237

3 October 1989 Second round 2nd leg	Aldershot	0–8 (0–8 agg.)	Sheffield Wednesday	Aldershot
		Report		Stadium: Recreation Park; Attendance: 4,011

=== League Trophy ===
8 November 1989 Preliminary round Group stage	Hereford United	3–1	Aldershot	Hereford
		Report		Stadium: Edgar Street; Attendance: 1,194

8 November 1989 Preliminary round Group stage	Aldershot	3–0	Birmingham City	Aldershot
		Report		Stadium: Recreation Park; Attendance: 1,148

9 January 1990 Preliminary round Group stage	Aldershot	1–4	Walsall	Aldershot
		Report		Stadium: Recreation Park; Attendance: 1,214
