= Andy Quy =

English footballer (born 1976)

Personal information
- Date of birth: 4 July 1976 (age 50)
- Place of birth: Harlow, England
- Height: 1.83 m (6 ft 0 in)
- Position: Goalkeeper

Team information
- Current team: Crystal Palace (goalkeeping coach)

Youth career
- 1989–1993: Tottenham Hotspur

Senior career*
Years	Team	Apps	(Gls)
1993–1994	Tottenham Hotspur	0	(0)
1994–1996	Derby County	0	(0)
1995	→ Stalybridge Celtic (loan)	4	(0)
1996–1997	Grimsby Town	0	(0)
1997	Stevenage Borough	0	(0)
1997	→ Kettering Town (loan)		
1997–2000	Hereford United	74	(0)
2000–2001	Halesowen Town		
- Belper Town
- * Club domestic league appearances and goals

Andrew Quy (born 4 July 1976) is an English retired footballer who played as a goalkeeper, most notably in the Conference for Hereford United. Since retiring as a player, he has worked as a goalkeeping coach for Lincoln City, Stoke City, Brentford, Burton Albion, Charlotte FC, Huddersfield Town and currently Crystal Palace. Quy also worked for Charlotte FC as an assistant coach.

== Playing career ==
Quy was born in Harlow and began his career with Tottenham Hotspur on a YTS contract. After failing to win a professional contract at White Hart Lane, he transferred to Derby County in July 1994 and subsequently spent time out on loan at Stalybridge Celtic. Following another non-playing spell at Grimsby Town during the 1996–97 season, Quy had short spells with Stevenage Borough and Kettering Town, before finally finding regular football with Hereford United in 1997. However, his career was cut short by injury and after spells with Halesowen Town and Belper Town, Quy decided to take up coaching.

== Coaching career ==
Quy began his coaching career in the Derby County and Aston Villa academies and was appointed as part-time first team goalkeeping coach at Lincoln City in 2006. In 2007, he joined Stoke City as first team goalkeeping coach. In January 2019, Quy and Kevin Russell assisted Stoke City's caretaker manager Rory Delap. In December 2019, Quy replaced Iñaki Caña as Brentford's first team goalkeeping coach. He left the role in August 2020.

In February 2021, Quy was appointed Head of Goalkeeping at Burton Albion and he served in the role until late October, when he took up the combined role of first team and academy goalkeeping coach at Major League Soccer expansion team Charlotte FC. Following the sacking of head coach Miguel Ángel Ramírez in May 2022, Quy relinquished his goalkeeping coach duties and was made a member of the interim coaching team, serving head coach Christian Lattanzio as an assistant alongside Jamath Shoffner. Quy was appointed to the role full-time in January 2023, but he followed Christian Lattanzio out of the club when his departure was announced on 8 November 2023.

On 20 February 2024, Quy was appointed goalkeeping coach at Huddersfield Town. He departed in March 2025 and was appointed goalkeeping coach of Crystal Palace in September 2025.

== Career statistics ==
Appearances and goals by club, season and competition
Club	Season	League			FA Cup		League Cup		Other		Total	
Club	Season	Division	Apps	Goals	Apps	Goals	Apps	Goals	Apps	Goals	Apps	Goals
Derby County	1994–95	First Division	0	0	0	0	1	0	―		1	0
Derby County	1996–97	Premier League	0	0	0	0	0	0	―		0	0
Derby County	Total		0	0	0	0	1	0	―		1	0
Stalybridge Celtic (loan)	1995–96	Conference	4	0	―		―		―		4	0
Grimsby Town	1996–97	First Division	0	0	0	0	0	0	―		0	0
Hereford United	1997–98	Conference	28	0	―		―		2 (Note: Appearances in FA Trophy)	0	30	0
Hereford United	1998–99	Conference	38	0	1	0	―		2 (Note: 1 appearance in Conference League Cup, 1 appearance in President's Cup)	0	41	0
Hereford United	1999–00	Conference	8	0	0	0	―		1 (Note: Appearance in Herefordshire Senior Cup)	0	9	0
Hereford United	Total		74	0	1	0	―		5	0	80	0
Career total			78	0	1	0	1	0	5	0	85	0
