= Dean Sturridge =

English footballer (born 1973)

Personal information
- Full name: Dean Constantine Sturridge
- Date of birth: 26 July 1973 (age 53)
- Place of birth: Birmingham, England
- Height: 5 ft 8 in (1.73 m)
- Position: Striker

Youth career
- Derby County

Senior career*
Years	Team	Apps	(Gls)
1991–2001	Derby County	190	(53)
1994	→ Torquay United (loan)	10	(5)
2001	Leicester City	22	(6)
2001–2005	Wolverhampton Wanderers	75	(28)
2003–2004	→ Sheffield United (loan)	4	(0)
2005–2006	Queens Park Rangers	11	(0)
2006–2007	Kidderminster Harriers	6	(0)
Total		318	(92)
- * Club domestic league appearances and goals

Dean Constantine Sturridge (born 26 July 1973) is an English former professional footballer and football commentator for beIN Sports.

As a player, he was a striker who notably played in the Premier League for Derby County, Leicester City and Wolverhampton Wanderers. He also played in the Football League for Torquay United, Sheffield United and Queens Park Rangers. He retired in 2007 following a short spell with non-league side Kidderminster Harriers.

Sturridge never played international football, but was called up to the Jamaica national team squad for World Cup 1998, however he rejected the call and the chance to represent the nation. Since retiring he has worked in the media and has previously worked for BBC Radio Derby.

== Playing career ==
=== Derby County ===
Sturridge began his career as a trainee at Derby County, and worked his way through the ranks to make his first team debut on 11 January 1992 in a 1–0 defeat at Southend United.

He gained more first team action over the next years, particularly at lowly Torquay United during a loan spell in the 1994–95 season, where he gained many admirers for his performances. He then returned to score 20 goals that fired Derby to the Premier League. His first year in the top flight was also successful, scoring 11 league goals, including one of the goals of the season against Arsenal, and the club's very first in the Premier League when they drew 3–3 at home to Leeds United in an opening day thriller at the Baseball Ground (from which they relocated to the new Pride Park Stadium 12 months later). Leeds had been 2–0 up when Sturridge found the net for the Rams in the 77th minute, before Paul Simpson pulled them level a minute later. Lee Bowyer sent Leeds back ahead in the 85th minute, before Sturridge scored again in the 87th minute to rescue the game for his team.

He played five seasons in the Premier League for the club, and is their record goalscorer in the Premier League era (32 Premier League goals). After nearly a decade with the Rams, he left for local rivals Leicester City in January 2001 for £375,000.

=== Leicester City ===
Sturridge's time at Leicester was far less successful than at Derby, as consistent injury problems and a change of manager saw his place under threat. He scored 7 goals during 25 appearances in total before being loaned to First Division Wolverhampton Wanderers in November 2001, just 10 months after his arrival at Filbert Street.

=== Wolverhampton Wanderers ===
His time at Wolves started brightly as he netted four times in his opening two games. This convinced the club to make the loan permanent after the initial month and he signed for £350,000 on Christmas Eve 2001.

His goalscoring form continued throughout the season, and he finished as the club's leading goalscorer with 21 goals in total, which took them to the play-offs. The following season saw him notch another 11 which again helped the team achieve a play-off finish, where they won promotion to the Premier League after a 3–0 final win over Sheffield United.

The striker didn't enjoy much of the team's top flight season as a combination of injuries and new arrivals sidelined him for all but 5 games, and he was loaned out to Sheffield United.

He was unable to put his injury problems behind him though and never regained a regular starting place for Wolves again. He moved on to Queens Park Rangers on a free transfer in March 2005.

=== Queens Park Rangers ===
At Queens Park Rangers his injury problems continued and he was only able to appear in 11 matches for the team, and never scored for them. In December 2005, it was announced that he would be leaving the club.

=== Kidderminster Harriers ===
On 26 June 2006, Sturridge joined Kidderminster Harriers on a one-year deal along with former Tamworth goalkeeper Scott Bevan, possibly becoming the biggest name player the club have ever signed.

Sturridge's time at Kidderminster didn't work out well, despite initially earning praise from his new manager Mark Yates over his positive attitude. He featured in six matches without finding the net, before suffering an Achilles tendon injury which ended his season prematurely.

He was not offered a new contract at the end of season.

== International career ==
In 1998, René Simões attempted to call up Sturridge for international duty with the Jamaica national team for the 1998 World Cup but the offer was rejected.

== Media career ==
In 1998, Sturridge appeared in season one of the fictional football drama Dream Team on Sky One (as himself) as a Harchester United player and was valued as a £5 million player.

Sturridge was acting as match summariser for BBC Radio Derby, following the sudden departure of Ted McMinn after the first match of the 2007–08 season. In this role he co-commentates, alongside Ross Fletcher, on all games played by his old club, Derby County. However, on the last game of the season, he revealed that he would not be returning to this role for the 2008–09 season as he wanted to focus on his coaching work.

== Personal life ==
His brother, Simon, was also a professional footballer, most notably playing for Birmingham City and Stoke City. He is the uncle of Daniel Sturridge, a striker who played for the likes of Chelsea, Liverpool and Man City, winning the UEFA Champions League twice and appearing 26 times for the England national team.

== Honours ==
Wolverhampton Wanderers

- Football League First Division play-offs: 2003

Individual

- PFA Fans' Player of the Year: 2001–02 First Division
- PFA Team of the Year: 1995–96 First Division
