= Paul Trollope =

Welsh footballer (born 1972)

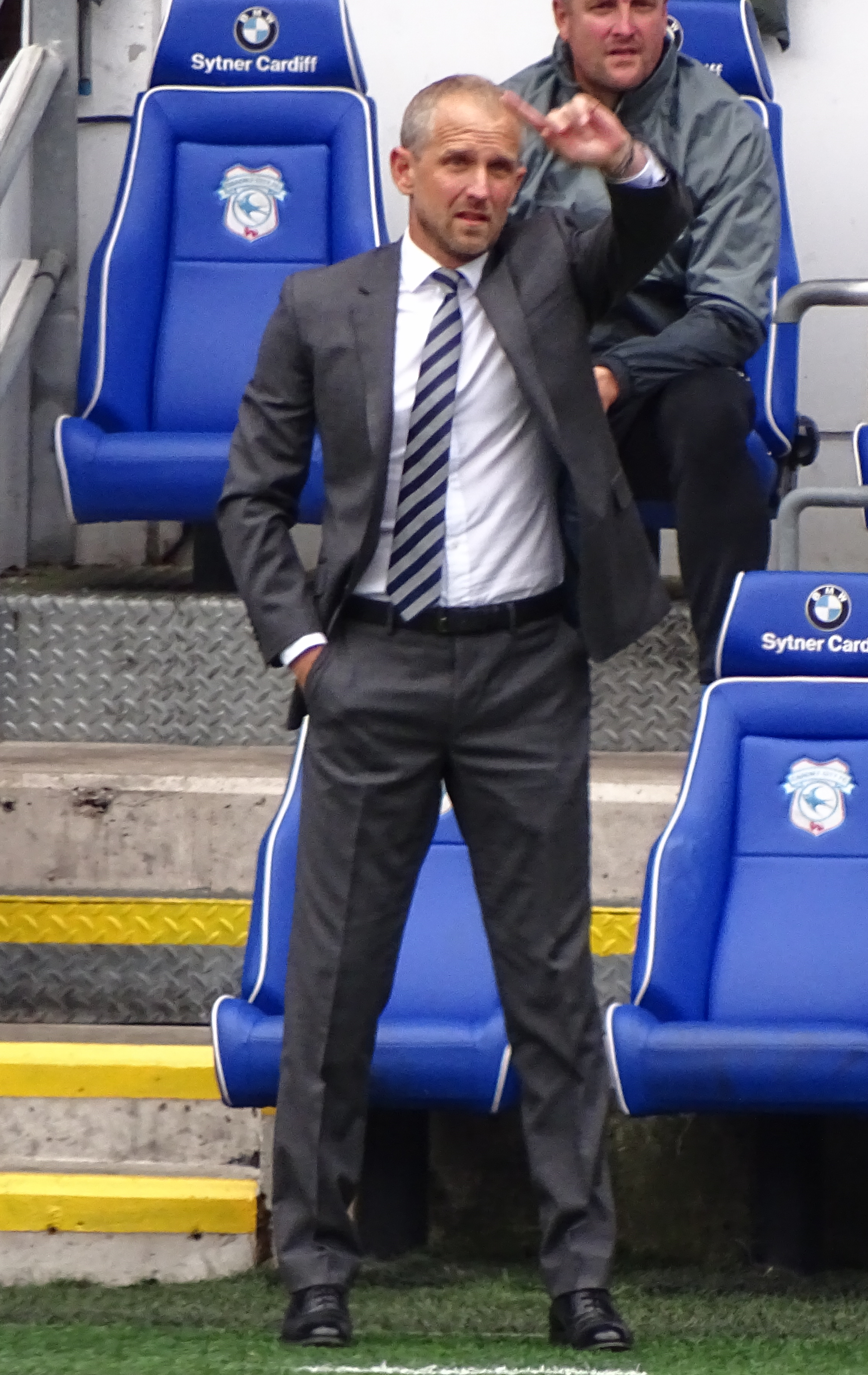
- Trollope with Cardiff City in 2016

Personal information
- Full name: Paul Jonathan Trollope
- Date of birth: 3 June 1972 (age 54)
- Place of birth: Swindon, England
- Height: 6 ft 0 in (1.83 m)
- Position: Midfielder

Senior career*
Years	Team	Apps	(Gls)
1989–1992	Swindon Town	0	(0)
1992	→ Torquay United (loan)	10	(0)
1992–1995	Torquay United	96	(16)
1994	→ Derby County (loan)	3	(1)
1995–1997	Derby County	62	(4)
1996	→ Grimsby Town (loan)	7	(1)
1996	→ Crystal Palace (loan)	10	(0)
1997–2002	Fulham	78	(5)
2002	Coventry City	6	(0)
2002–2004	Northampton Town	84	(8)
2004–2007	Bristol Rovers	30	(2)
Total		386	(37)

International career
1997–2003	Wales	9	(0)

Managerial career
- 2005: Bristol Rovers (caretaker)
- 2005–2010: Bristol Rovers
- 2011–2012: Birmingham City (first team coach)
- 2012–2014: Norwich City (first team coach)
- 2015–2016: Cardiff City (head coach)
- 2015–2016: Wales (coach)
- 2016: Cardiff City
- 2016–2019: Brighton & Hove Albion (assistant)
- 2020–2021: Nottingham Forest (assistant)
- 2022–2025: Luton Town (joint-assistant)
- 2025: Southampton (assistant)
- 2025–2026: Wolverhampton Wanderers (assistant)
- * Club domestic league appearances and goals

Paul Jonathan Trollope (born 3 June 1972) is a football coach and former professional player, who played as a midfielder. Born in England, he represented Wales internationally.

As a player, he began his career with Swindon Town in 1989, but made his name at Torquay United between 1992 and 1995. He then transferred to Derby County, before signing with Fulham in 1997. After five years he moved on to Northampton Town via Coventry City. He joined his final club, Bristol Rovers, in 2004, before retiring as a player in 2007. He played for Wales at international level.

While still a player, he was appointed caretaker manager of Bristol Rovers in 2005. Impressing in the position he was handed the job permanently, and took the club to the Football League Trophy final in 2007, as well victory in the League Two play-off final. Stabilising the club in League One, he took Rovers to the FA Cup quarter-finals in 2008, equalling a club record in the competition. After two more seasons finishing mid-table in League One, he was sacked after a poor start to 2010–11. He was first-team coach at Birmingham City for the 2011–12 season, and then followed manager Chris Hughton to Norwich City until April 2014. On 24 November 2016, Trollope joined Brighton and Hove Albion alongside Chris Hughton's coaching team, as assistant manager.

== Playing career ==
=== Club career ===
Trollope was born in Swindon, Wiltshire, and is the son of former Swindon Town defender John Trollope. He began his career at Swindon Town as a trainee, turning professional in December 1989, but failed to make the first team. He joined Torquay United on loan in March 1992 and signed on a free transfer for the Plainmoor side that summer. after 106 league games and 16 goals for Torquay, he was a regular under manager Don O'Riordan and started to attract Premier League clubs and moved to Derby County in December 1994 for a fee of £100,000. He had loan spells with Grimsby Town in August 1996 and Crystal Palace in October 1996.

He moved to Fulham in November 1997 for a fee of £600,000. He made ten league appearances during Fulham's 2000–01 season after which they were promoted to the Premier League. However, he left the Cottagers to join Coventry City on a free transfer in March 2002 after losing his place at Craven Cottage. He stayed only a few months at Highfield Road, moving to Northampton Town in July after being released at the end of the season.

=== International career ===
In May 1997, Trollope was called up by then Wales manager, Bobby Gould, and made his debut in a 1–0 victory over Scotland at Kilmarnock. While Trollope was never able to hold down a regular place in the Wales national team, he made nine appearances for the senior squad over six years, culminating in March 2003 in a 4–0 home victory over Azerbaijan in the ultimately unsuccessful qualifying campaign for Euro 2004.

== Coaching and management career ==
=== Bristol Rovers ===
In June 2004 he moved to Bristol Rovers on a free transfer. In his second season, he became caretaker manager and was then appointed first-team coach in a two-tier managerial structure, alongside Director of Football Lennie Lawrence, in November 2005. His first season in charge ended in a respectable midtable position of 12th place in League Two. The following year Rovers reached the Football League Trophy final but lost to Doncaster Rovers. They made up for this loss by winning promotion to League One via the play-offs.

In the 2007–08 season, Trollope steered Bristol Rovers to mid-table security after a shaky start. Rovers also made the quarter-finals of the FA Cup for the first time in 50 years. In September 2009, following more success, he signed a rolling one-year contract under which his title changed to manager.

Despite his achievements at the club, he was sacked on 15 December 2010, with Rovers lying in the League One relegation zone. His overall record in charge of the club was 106 wins and 71 draws from 284 games. During his time with the club, Trollope won the EFL League One Manager of the Month award on two occasions, for October 2008 after four wins and one draw from five and September 2009.

=== Return to coaching ===
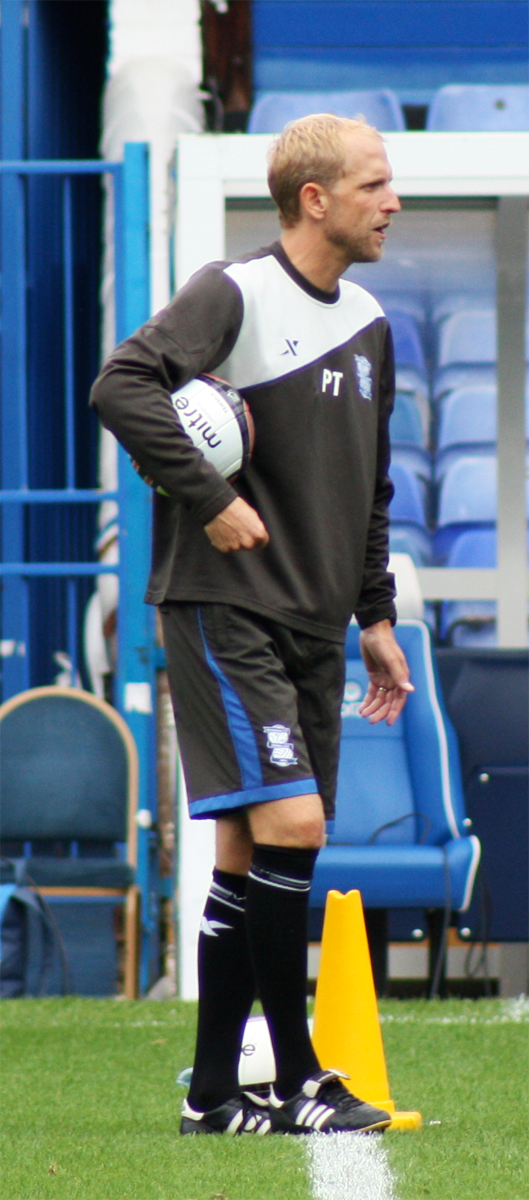
Trollope with Birmingham City in 2011

In July 2011, Trollope was appointed first-team coach of Championship club Birmingham City to work with manager Chris Hughton. When Hughton left for Premier League club Norwich City at the end of the season, Trollope went with him, again as first-team coach. He left the club when Hughton was dismissed in April 2014.

Trollope was appointed head coach of Championship club Cardiff City in February 2015. On 21 July 2015, Trollope was appointed as a coach for the Wales national team alongside his role at Cardiff City.

=== Cardiff City ===
At the end of the 2015–16 season, Cardiff manager Russell Slade moved into a head of football role and Trollope was named as his successor, his first job in management since departing Bristol Rovers six years previously. Slade later resigned from his role, after just two weeks, on 3 June. After a poor start to the season, winning 2 of his opening 12 matches, Trollope was sacked by the club on 4 October 2016.

=== Brighton & Hove Albion ===
On 24 November 2016, Trollope joined Brighton & Hove Albion as assistant manager. After the sacking of Chris Hughton on 13 May 2019 as Brighton manager, Trollope was also relieved of his duties at the club.

=== Nottingham Forest ===
On 8 October 2020, Trollope again followed former manager Chris Hughton as assistant, joining Nottingham Forest.

=== Luton Town ===
In November 2022, Trollope joined Luton Town as joint-assistant manager to former international teammate Rob Edwards.

=== Southampton ===
On 25 June 2025, Trollope joined Southampton as assistant manager.

=== Wolverhampton Wanderers ===
On 21 November 2025, Trollope joined Wolverhampton Wanderers as assistant head coach, reuniting with Rob Edwards. Following relegation, he departed the club alongside Edwards at the end of the 2025–26 season.

== Managerial statistics ==
As of match played 1 October 2016

Managerial record by team and tenure
Team	From	To	Record					Ref
Team	From	To	P	W	D	L	Win %	Ref
Bristol Rovers	22 September 2005	15 December 2010	284	106	71	107	37.3	
Cardiff City	18 May 2016	4 October 2016	12	2	2	8	16.7	
Total			296	108	73	115	36.5	—

== Honours ==
=== As a player ===
Derby County

- Football League First Division second-place promotion: 1995–96

Fulham

- Football League First Division: 2000–01
- Football League Second Division: 1998–99

=== As a manager ===
Bristol Rovers

- Football League Two play-offs: 2007
- Football League Trophy runner-up: 2006–07

Individual

- Football League Two Manager of the Month: April 2007
- Football League One Manager of the Month: October 2008, September 2009
