= List of Grimsby Town F.C. players =

This is a list of notable footballers who have played for Grimsby Town. Generally, this means players that have played 100 or more league matches for the club. However, some players who have played fewer matches are also included; this includes players that have had considerable success at other clubs.

Players are listed in alphabetical order. Appearances and goals are for league matches only; wartime matches are excluded. Substitute appearances included.

As of 1 November 2008.

== A ==
Name	Nationality	Position	Grimsby career	Appearances	Goals
Walter Abbott	England	IL	1919–1920		
George Affleck	Scotland	FB	1919–1924	197	0
Paul Agnew	Northern Ireland	LB	1983–1994	243	3
Keith Alexander	England/Saint Lucia	FW	1988–1990	83	26
Bradley Allen	England	FW	1999–2001	80	15
Willie Andrews	United States/Ireland	WH	1912–1914	105	2
Bill Appleyard	England	FW	1901–1902; 1908	44; 13	19; 2
Jock Archibald	Scotland	GK	1923–1926	111	0
Tony Arrowsmith	England	FB	1911–1914	137	0
Lee Ashcroft	England	FW	1998–1999	61	15

== B ==
Name	Nationality	Position	Grimsby career	Appearances	Goals
Joseph Bache	England	FW	1920	5	0
Darren Barnard	Wales	LB	2002–2003	63	4
Alan Barnett	England	GK	1958–1962	116	0
Frank Barton	England	MF	1973–1975	123	15
Nigel Batch	England	GK	1976–1986	348	0
Peter Beagrie	England	MF	2006	9	0
Dave Beasant	England	GK	1992	6	0
Bill Bellas	England	FB	1951–1952	5	0
Jackie Bestall	England	MF	1926–1937	427	76
Harry Betmead	England	CB	1931–1946	296	10
Garry Birtles	England	FW	1989–1991	69	9
Fred Bisby	England	MF	1905–1907	12	1
Kingsley Black	Northern Ireland	MF	1996–2000	141	8
Ernest Blake	England	MF	1920–1921	7	0
William Blanchard	England	FB	1907–1915	11	0
Jimmy Bloomer	Scotland	FW	1949–1954	109	42
Tom Blythe	England	IF	1898	4	1
Paul Bolland	England	MF	2005–2010	118	13
Ivano Bonetti	Italy	MF	1995	19	3
Phil Bonnyman	Scotland	MF	1982–1986	151	15
Dave Booth	England	FB	1972–1977	200	7
Michael Boulding	England	FW	2001–2002; 2002–2003	35; 39	11; 16
Jimmy Boyd	Scotland	FW	1938–1939	37	9
Dave Boylen	England	MF	1966–1977	384	34
Stuart Brace	England	FW	1968–1973	206	81
Alec Brader	England	FW	1960–1963	2	0
Jack Bradford	England	WH	1920–1923	108	0
Tommy Briggs	England	FW	1947–1950; 1957–1958	116; 19	78; 9
Bert Brocklesbury	England	FB	1898	3	0
Mike Brolly	Scotland	MF	1976–1981	254	27
Ernie Brooks	England	MF	1919–1920	3	0
Marlon Broomes	England	CB	2001	15	0
George Browell	England	CB	1911–1912	23	0
Willie Brown	Scotland	FB	1951–1957	265	1
Edward Brumley	England	CB	1901–1903	5	2
Teddy Buck	England	WH	1929–1939	354	4
Wayne Burnett	England	MF	1997–2001	106	6
Andy Butler	England	CB	2006	4	0
Martin Butler	England	FW	2008	16	5
Danny Butterfield	England	RB	1997–2001	124	3

== C ==
Name	Nationality	Position	Grimsby career	Appearances	Goals
Billy Cairns	England	FW	1946–1953	221	121
Stuart Campbell	England/Scotland	MF	2000–2003	155	12
Jimmy Carmichael	Scotland	FW	1920–1926	227	137
Herbert Chapman	England	FW	1898	10	4
Lew Chatterley	England	FW	1972–1974	73	16
Steve Chettle	England	CB	2002–2003	20	1
Gary Childs	England	MF	1989–1996	233	26
Allenby Chilton	England	CB	1954–1956	63	0
Daryl Clare	Ireland	FW	1995–2001	79	9
Brian Clifton	England	WH	1962–1965	104	5
Harry Clifton	Wales	MF	2015–2024	238	21
John Cockerill	England	MF	1988–1991	107	19
Ron Cockerill	England	CB	1958–1967	294	28
Steve Coglin	England	FW	1926–1930	118	39
Stacy Coldicott	England	MF	1998–2004	121	4
Ernie Coleman	England	FW	1928–1931	87	57
Doug Collins	England	MF	1963–1968	103	9
Dick Conner	England	WH	1953–1958	186	8
Terry Cooke	England	MF	2002–2003	28	1
Joe Cooper	England	FW	1924–1931	154	47
Danny Coyne	Wales	GK	1999–2002	181	0
Colin Cramb	Scotland	FW	2004–2005	11	2
Tony Crane	England	CB	2003–2006	45	4
Charlie Craven	England	FW	1930–1937	256	95
Paul Crichton	England	GK	1993–1996	133	0
Max Crocombe	New Zealand	GK	2021–2023	75	0
Gary Croft	England	LB	1990–1995; 2005–2007	149; 61	3; 0
Dean Crombie	England	CB	1978–1986	320	4
Jason Crowe	England	RB	2003–2005	69	4
Mick Cullen	Scotland	FW	1958–1962	178	35
Bobby Cumming	Scotland	MF	1974–1986	365	57
Shaun Cunnington	England	MF	1987–1991	182	13
Terry Curran	England	MF	1987	12	0
Mike Czuczman	England	CD	1971–1975; 1980–1981	113; 9	6; 0

== D ==
Name	Nationality	Position	Grimsby career	Appearances	Goals
Jon Daly	Ireland	FW	2005	3	1
Aidan Davison	England/Northern Ireland	GK	1997–1998; 2003	77; 32	0; 0
Jim Dobbin	Scotland	MF	1991–1995; 1997–1998	164; 6	21; 0
Don Donovan	Ireland	FB	1958–1964	238	1
Kevin Donovan	England	MF	1997–2000	156	24
Kevin Drinkell	England	FW	1976–1984	272	89
Jimmy Dyson	Scotland	MF	1931–1937	139	38

== E ==
Name	Nationality	Position	Grimsby career	Appearances	Goals
Paul Emson	England	MF	1983–1985	97	15
Zhang Enhua	China	CB	2000	17	3
Billy Evans	England	FW	1955–1957	102	28

== F ==
Name	Nationality	Position	Grimsby career	Appearances	Goals
Willie Falconer	Scotland	FW	2002	2	0
Jimmy Fell	England	MF	1956–1960	166	35
Nick Fenton	England	CB	2006–2008	80	6
Alan Fettis	Northern Ireland	GK	2004	11	0
Fred Fisher	England	FB	1938–1950	166	0
Terry Fleming	England	MF	2004–2005	43	2
Harry Fletcher	England	FW	1892–1897; 1900–1902; 1905–1909	154; 79; 40	73; 12; 7
Terrell Forbes	England	CB	2004–2005	33	0
Simon Ford	Jamaica	CB	2001–2004	78	4
Tony Ford	England	MF	1975–1985; 1991–1993	355; 68	55; 3
Jamie Forrester	England	FW	1995–1997	41	6
Tom Frith	England	FB	1892–1898	125	0
Ben Futcher	England	CB	2006	19	2
Paul Futcher	England	CB	1990–1994	132	0

== G ==
Name	Nationality	Position	Grimsby career	Appearances	Goals
Hughie Gallacher	Scotland	FW	1937	12	3
Tony Gallimore	England	LB	1995–2002	273	4
Dave Gilbert	England	MF	1988–1994; 1997	259; 5	41; 0
Wilf Gillow	England	WH	1919–1924	103	5
Pat Glover	Wales	FW	1929–1938	227	180
Dean Gordon	England	LB	2004–2005	20	2
Jimmy Gordon	England	CB	1909–1914	126	7
Paddy Gray	Scotland	CB	1898–1902	121	5
Stewart Gray	England	CB	1970–1976	264	2
Paul Groves	England	MF	1992–1995; 1997–2003	184; 270	38; 33
Goran Yabae	Canada	MF	1999–2002; 1997–2003	184; 270	38; 33

== H ==
Name	Nationality	Position	Grimsby career	Appearances	Goals
Alec Hall	England	WH	1929–1947	358	4
Des Hamilton	England	MF	2003–2004	27	0
Peter Handyside	Scotland	CB	1992–2000	190	4
Dean Henderson	England	GK	2016–2017	7	0
Laurens ten Heuvel	Netherlands	FW	2003	4	0
Mike Hickman	England	FW	1968–1974	254	48
Sandy Higgins	England	CB	1892–1896; 1911	126; 1	27; 0
Brian Hill	England	MF	1960–1966	180	26
Jack Hodgson	England	FB	1932–1947	212	2
Phil Hubbard	England	MF	1929–1947	146	37
Richard Hughes	Scotland	MF	2003	12	1

== J ==
Name	Nationality	Position	Grimsby career	Appearances	Goals
Hughie Jacobson	England	FB	1925–1934	360	1
Michael Jeffrey	England	FW	2000–2002	42	2
Dennis Jennings	England	MF	1932–1935	99	29
Phil Jevons	England	FW	2001–2004	63	18
Paul Jewell	England	FW	1995	5	1
Keith Jobling	England	CB	1953–1968	450	5
Kevin Jobling	England	FB	1987–1997	285	10
Pat Johnston	Ireland	WH	1948–1956	250	16
Gary Jones	England	FW	2005–2008	118	27
Rob Jones	England	CB	2004–2006	60	5

== K ==
Name	Nationality	Position	Grimsby career	Appearances	Goals
Steve Kabba	England	FW	2002	13	6
Jean-Paul Kamudimba Kalala	DR Congo	MF	2005–2006; 2008–2009	21; 21	5; 2
Brian Keeble	England	FB	1959–1964	172	1
Jimmy Kelly	England	FB	1932–1937	160	3

== L ==
Name	Nationality	Position	Grimsby career	Appearances	Goals
Jamie Lawrence	Jamaica	MF	2004	5	1
Brian Laws	England	CB	1994–1996	46	2
Jason Lee	England	FW	1997	7	2
Jack Lester	England	FW	1994–1999	133	17
Mark Lever	England	CB	1987–1999	361	8
Jack Lewis	England	FW	1969–1976	258	74
Gary Liddell	Scotland	FW	1976–1980	105	22
Billy Lindsay	England	FB	1894–1897	106	1
Steve Livingstone	England	FW/CB	1993–2002	289	43
Stan Lloyd	England	MF	1948–1952	148	23

== M ==
Name	Nationality	Position	Grimsby career	Appearances	Goals
Clint Marcelle	Trinidad and Tobago	FW	2004	3	0
Tommy McCairns	England	FW	1893–1897	137	86
John McDermott	England	FB	1987–2007	647	10
Jimmy McGowan	Scotland	WH	1946–1949	34	4
Frank McKenna	England	FW	1922–1926	114	31
James McKeown	Republic of Ireland	GK	2011-2022	432	0
George McLean	Scotland	FW	1962–1964	91	41
Duncan McMillan	Scotland	CB	1948–1954	188	2
Jimmy Maddison	England	MF	1950–1958	272	40
Billy Marshall	England	MF	1923–1931	340	59
Frank Martin	England	WH	1911–1920	159	1
Clive Mendonca	England	FW	1991–1996	166	61
Steve Mildenhall	England	GK	2005–2006	46	0
Bobby Mitchell	England	MF	1978–1981	142	6
Ken Moody	England	FB	1947–1950	114	0
David Moore	England	FB	1978–1982; 1986–1987	136; 4	2; 0
Kevin Moore	England	CB	1976–1986	400	28
Bert Morley	England	FB	1904–1906	93	3
George Mountain	England	FB	1895; 1897–1902	1; 151	0; 4

== N ==
Name	Nationality	Position	Grimsby career	Appearances	Goals
Alan Neilson	Wales	CB	2001–2002	8	2
Alf Nelmes	England	WH	1898–1905	219	14
Tom Newey	England	LB	2005–2009	134	4
David Nielsen	Denmark	FW	2000–2001	17	5
Chris Nicholl	England/Northern Ireland	CB	1983–1984	70	0
Lee Nogan	Wales	FW	1997–1999	73	10

== O ==
Name	Nationality	Position	Grimsby career	Appearances	Goals
Iffy Onuora	Scotland	FW	2003–2004	19	3
John Oster	Wales	MF	1996–1997; 2002–2003	24; 17	3; 6

== P ==
Name	Nationality	Position	Grimsby career	Appearances	Goals
Andy Parkinson	England	MF	2004–2006	88	12
Malcolm Partridge	England	FW	1974–1978	138	25
Martin Paterson	Northern Ireland	FW	2006–2007	15	6
Norman Penrose	England	WH	1938–1949	9	0
Thomas Pinault	France	MF	2004–2005	43	7
Cliff Portwood	England	FW	1961–1963	92	35
Alan Pouton	England	MF	1999–2003	121	12
Gerry Priestley	England	MF	1955–1958	110	11
John Priestley	Scotland	WH	1928–1931	139	7
Martin Pringle	Sweden	FW	2002	2	0
Jack Prior	England	MF	1926–1931	160	34

== R ==
Name	Nationality	Position	Grimsby career	Appearances	Goals
Ron Rafferty	England	FW	1956–1962	264	145
Isaiah Rankin	England	FW	2004; 2006–2008	12; 37	4; 2
Graham Rathbone	England	CB	1966–1972	233	11
Tommy Read	England	GK	1927–1933	247	0
Michael Reddy	Ireland	FW	2004–2007	94	23
Tony Rees	Wales	FW	1989–1993	141	33
Dave Richardson	England	FB	1955–1959	175	1
Thomas Rippon	England	FW	1911–1919	121	37
Nicky Rizzo	Australia	MF	2007	1	0
Neil Robinson	England	FB	1984–1987	109	6
Joe Robson	England	FW	1924–1930	161	123
Graham Rodger	Scotland/England	CB	1991–1997	146	11
Bobby Ross	Scotland	MF	1965–1970	212	18

== S ==
Name	Nationality	Position	Grimsby career	Appearances	Goals
Georges Santos	Cape Verde	CB/MF	2002–2003	26	1
Ashley Sestanovich	England/Croatia/Grenada	MF	2004–2005	22	2
Reg Scotson	England	WH	1950–1954	164	4
Jackie Scott	Northern Ireland	MF	1956–1962	240	51
Walter Scott	England	GK	1907–1909; 1919	80; 19	0; 0
Max Seeburg	Germany	WH	1911	20	0
Craig Shakespeare	England	MF	1993–1997	106	10
Steve Sherwood	England	GK	1987–1992	183	0
Nicky Southall	England	MF	1995–1997	72	6
David Smith	England	LB	1997–2001	112	9
Martin Spendiff	England	GK	1902–1904; 1913–1919	66; 57	0; 0
Tommy Spink	England	MF	1914–1921	116	3

== T ==
Name	Nationality	Position	Grimsby career	Appearances	Goals
Graham Taylor	England	FB	1963–1967	189	2
Robert Taylor	England	FW	2002; 2002–2003	4; 1	1; 0
Matt Tees	Scotland	FW	1963–1966; 1970–1972	113; 83	51; 42
Jimmy Thompson	England	FB	1962–1966	156	2
Lee Thorpe	England	FW	2004	6	0
Tony Thorpe	England	FW	2006–2007	6	0
John Thorrington	United States	MF	2004	3	0
Andy Tillson	England	CB	1988–1990; 1992	105; 4	5; 0
Andy Todd	England	CB	2002	12	3
Ciaran Toner	Northern Ireland	MF	2005–2008	96	14
George Tweedy	England	GK	1932–1952	347	0

== V ==
Name	Nationality	Position	Grimsby career	Appearances	Goals
Ned Vincent	England	FB	1934–1946	144	2

== W ==
Name	Nationality	Position	Grimsby career	Appearances	Goals
Harry Wainman	England	GK	1964–1977	420	0
Paul Warhurst	England	CB/MF/FW	2004	7	0
Joe Waters	Ireland	MF	1975–1983	357	65
Tommy Watson	England	MF	1987–1995	172	24
Duncan Welbourne	England	FB	1957–1963	130	3
Sidney Wheelhouse	England	FB	1907–1914	234	3
Jimmy Whitehouse	England	GK	1892–1895; 1899	110; 27	0; 0
Justin Whittle	England	CB	2004–2008	131	3
Trevor Whymark	England	FW	1980–1983	93	16
Tommy Widdrington	England	MF	1996–1999	89	8
Joe Widdowson	England	LB	2009–2010	58	1
Clive Wigginton	England	CB	1968–1974; 1979–1982	173; 122	6; 2
Paul Wilkinson	England	FW	1982–1984	71	27
Menno Willems	Netherlands	MF	2000–2002	54	2
Clarrie Williams	England	GK	1952–1959	188	0
Charlie Wilson	England	FB	1923–1932	273	2
Curtis Woodhouse	England	MF	2006	16	1
Neil Woods	England	FW	1990–1997	226	42
Dave Worthington	England	FB	1966–1972	293	14
Charlie Wrack	England	CB	1925–1930	125	2
Darren Wrack	England	MF	1996–1998	13	1
Charlie Wright	Scotland	GK	1962–1965	129	0

== Key ==
- GK — Goalkeeper
- RB — Right back
- LB — Left back
- FB — Fullback
- CB — Centre back
- WH — Wing half
- MF — Midfielder
- FW — Forward
