= List of Grimsby Town F.C. records and statistics =

Grimsby Town Football Club is a professional association football club based in Cleethorpes, England. The club competes in EFL League Two, the fourth tier of the English football league system.

The club was founded in 1878 as Grimsby Pelham Football Club. Grimsby are the only team from Lincolnshire to play in the first tier of English football and the only club to reach the semi-finals of the FA Cup. The club's record appearance maker is John McDermott making 754 appearances and their leading goalscorer is Pat Glover with 180 goals. Their record attendance is 31,651 for an FA Cup tie against Wolverhampton Wanderers in 1937. Grimsby have played in all of the top five divisions of the English league system.

== Honours and achievements ==
=== Honours ===
- Second Division / Championship (level 2)
  - Champions: 1898–99, 1933–34
  - Runners-up: 1928–29
  - Third place: 1895–96, 1896–97
- Third Division / Third Division North / League One (level 3)
  - Champions: 1925–26, 1955–56, 1979–80
  - Runners-up: 1951–52, 1961–62
  - Third place: 1921–22, 1990–91
  - Play-off winners: 1998
- Fourth Division / League Two (level 4)
  - Champions: 1971–72
  - Runners-up: 1978–79, 1989–90
- National League (level 5)
  - Play-off winners: 2016, 2022
- Football League Trophy
  - Winners: 1981–82, 1997–98
  - Runners-up: 2007–08
- FA Trophy
  - Runners-up: 2012–13, 2015–16

Minor titles

- Midland League
  - Winners (5): 1910–11, 1930–31, 1931–32, 1933–34, 1946–47
- Lincolnshire Senior Cup
  - Winners (39): 1885–86, 1888–89, 1896–97, 1898–99, 1899–1900, 1900–01, 1901–02, 1902–03, 1905–06, 1908–09, 1912–13, 1920–21, 1922–23, 1924–25, 1928–29, 1929–30, 1932–33, 1935–36, 1936–37, 1937–38, 1946–47, 1949–50, 1952–53, 1967–68, 1972–73, 1975–76, 1979–80, 1983–84, 1986–87, 1989–90, 1991–92, 1992–93, 1993–94, 1994–95, 1995–96, 1999–2000, 2011–12, 2012–13, 2014–15
- Midland Youth Cup
  - Winners: 2005–06, 2009–10
- Puma Youth Alliance League Cup
  - Winners: 2008–09

=== Achievements ===
Best performances in competitions entered
Competition	Best result	Winners	Runners-up	Play-off winners	Play-off runners-up	Semi-finalists
First Division (L1)	5th	0	0	N/A	N/A	N/A
Second Division/First Division/EFL Championship (L2)	Winners	2	1	0	0	N/A
Third Division/Second Division/EFL League One (L3)	Winners	1	1	1	0	N/A
Third Division North (L3)	Winners	2	1	N/A	N/A	N/A
Fourth Division/Third Division/EFL League Two (L4)	Winners	1	2	0	1	N/A
Conference National/National League (L5)	Play-off Winners	0	0	2	1	2
Football Alliance	Third place	0	0	0	0	N/A
Midland League (Historic L5)	Winners	5	0	0	0	N/A
FA Cup	Semi-finalists	0	0	N/A	N/A	2
Football League Cup/EFL Cup	Fifth round	0	0	N/A	N/A	0
Football League Group Cup/Football League Trophy/EFL Trophy	Winners	2	1	N/A	N/A	1
FA Trophy	Runners-up	0	2	N/A	N/A	1
Full Members' Cup	Second round	0	0	0	0	0
Anglo-Italian Cup	Group stage	0	0	N/A	N/A	0
Anglo-Scottish Cup	Preliminary Stage	0	0	N/A	N/A	0
Lincolnshire Senior Cup	Winners	39	25	N/A	N/A	N/A
Midland Youth Cup	Winners	2	0	N/A	N/A	N/A
Puma Youth Alliance League Cup	Winners	1	0	N/A	N/A	N/A

- Seasons spent at Level 1 of the football league system: 12
- Seasons spent at Level 2 of the football league system: 55
- Seasons spent at Level 3 of the football league system: 28
- Seasons spent at Level 4 of the football league system: 19
- Seasons spent at Level 5 of the football league system: 7

== Club records ==
More clubs have lost their managers after meeting Grimsby Town than after playing any other club.

=== Games ===
- Biggest League attendance: 26,605 vs. Stockport County on 11 April 1952
- Biggest FA Cup attendance: 31,651 v Wolverhampton Wanderers on 20 February 1937
- Biggest League Cup attendance: 23,115 vs. Wolverhampton Wanderers on 4 December 1979
- Biggest neutral venue attendance: 76,972 vs. Wolverhampton Wanderers on 25 March 1939 in the FA Cup semi-final at Old Trafford, Manchester
- Smallest League attendance: 1,833 vs. Brentford on 3 May 1969
- Smallest cup attendance: 248 vs. Sunderland U23's in Football League Trophy on 8 November 2017
- Highest League gate receipts: £81,200 vs. Newcastle United on 4 May 1993
- Highest FA Cup gate receipts: £119,799 vs. Aston Villa on 4 January 1994
- Highest League Cup gate receipts: £97,000 vs. Tottenham Hotspur on 29 October 1991
- Smallest League gate receipts: £32 vs. Glossop on 13 April 1907
- Biggest League home win: 8–0 vs. Tranmere Rovers on 4 September 1925
- Biggest League away win 7–0 vs. Bristol Rovers on 14 December 1957
- Biggest League home defeat 0–7 vs. Manchester United on 26 December 1899
- Biggest League away defeat 1–9 vs. Arsenal on 28 January 1931
- Biggest League home draw 5–5 vs. Preston North End on 15 October 1932, vs. Charlton Athletic on 7 January 1933 and vs. Notts County on 13 January 2024
- Biggest League away draw 4–4 vs. Lincoln City on 3 September 1958, v Chesterfield on 27 March 2004 and v Eastleigh on 15 May 2022.
- Biggest cup home win: 8–0 vs. Darlington on 21 November 1885
- Biggest cup away win: 8–1 vs. Croydon Common on 18 January 1911
- Biggest cup defeat: 1–8 vs. Phoenix Bessemer on 25 November 1882
- Biggest cup draw 5–5 vs. Fulham on 9 January 1954
- Highest scoring game: 9–2 win vs. Darwen on 15 April 1899 and 6–5 win over Burnley on 29 October 2002
- Biggest League defeat: 1–9 vs. Arsenal on 28 January 1931

=== Player records ===
- Most League goals in a season: 42, Pat Glover (1933–34)
- Most League goals in total: 180, Pat Glover (1930–39)
- Most League appearances: 647, John McDermott (1987–2007)
- Most appearances (all competitions): 754, John McDermott (1987–2007)
- Most capped player while at club: 15 caps, Géza Dávid Turi for Faroe Islands
- Most capped player: 68 caps, Zhang Enhua for China
- Highest transfer fee paid: £550,000 to Preston North End for Lee Ashcroft on 11 August 1998
- Highest transfer fee received: £1.5 million rising to £2 million from Everton for John Oster on 1 August 1997
- Longest serving current player: Kieran Green since July 2022.
- Youngest player: Louis Boyd, 15 years and 324 days, vs. Harrogate Town on 8 September 2020.
- Oldest player: Peter Beagrie, 40 years and 322 days, vs. Hartlepool United on 26 September 2006.
- Youngest goalscorer: Louis Boyd, 15 years and 324 days, vs. Harrogate Town on 8 September 2020.

== Annual awards ==
=== PFA Team of the Year ===
The following have been included in the PFA Team of the Year whilst playing for Grimsby Town :

- 1978–79 (England) Kevin Moore, (Republic of Ireland) Joe Waters
- 1979–80 (England) Kevin Moore, (Republic of Ireland) Joe Waters
- 1984–85 (England) Paul Wilkinson
- 1997–98 (England) Kevin Donovan, (England) Paul Groves
- 2005–06 (Republic of Ireland) Michael Reddy

=== National League Team of the Year ===
The following players have been included in the Conference Premier or National League Team of the Year whilst playing for Grimsby Town:

- 2011–12 (England) Liam Hearn
- 2012–13 (Republic of Ireland) James McKeown, (England) Aswad Thomas, (England) Craig Disley
- 2013–14 (England) Shaun Pearson, (England) Craig Disley
- 2014–15 (England) Shaun Pearson, (England) Craig Disley, (England) Nathan Arnold
- 2015–16 (Republic of Ireland) James McKeown, (England) Josh Gowling, (Republic of Ireland) Pádraig Amond
- 2021–22 (England) Luke Waterfall, (England) John McAtee

=== Player of the Year ===
As voted for by supporters of the club.

- 1971–72 (England) Harry Wainman
- 1972–73 (England) Dave Booth
- 1973–74 (England) Dave Boylen
- 1974–75 (England) Frank Barton
- 1975–76 (England) Harry Wainman
- 1976–77 (Republic of Ireland) Joe Waters
- 1977–78 (England) Geoff Barker
- 1978–79 (Republic of Ireland) Joe Waters
- 1979–80 (England) Dean Crombie
- 1980–81 (England) Nigel Batch
- 1981–82 (England) Nigel Batch
- 1982–83 (England) Kevin Drinkell
- 1983–84 (England) Tony Ford
- 1984–85 (England) Tony Ford
- 1985–86 (England) Gordon Hobson
- 1986–87 (England) Neil Robinson
- 1987–88 (Republic of Ireland) Don O'Riordan
- 1988–89 (England) Shaun Cunnington
- 1989–90 (England) Garry Birtles
- 1990–91 (England) Dave Gilbert
- 1991–92 (England) Paul Futcher
- 1992–93 (England) Paul Futcher
- 1993–94 (England) Paul Crichton
- 1994–95 (England) Gary Croft
- 1995–96 (England) Paul Groves
- 1996–97 (England) Graham Rodger
- 1997–98 (England) Kevin Donovan
- 1998–99 (England) Paul Groves
- 1999–2000 (England) Mark Lever
- 2000–01 (Wales) Danny Coyne
- 2001–02 (Wales) Danny Coyne
- 2002–03 (Cape Verde) Georges Santos
- 2003–04 (England) Phil Jevons
- 2004–05 (England) John McDermott
- 2005–06 (England) Rob Jones
- 2006–07 (England) Justin Whittle
- 2007–08 (England) Phil Barnes
- 2008–09 (England) Ryan Bennett
- 2009–10 (England) Peter Bore
- 2010–11 (England) Alan Connell
- 2011–12 (England) Liam Hearn
- 2012–13 (Republic of Ireland) James McKeown
- 2013–14 (Republic of Ireland) James McKeown
- 2014–15 (Northern Ireland) Carl Magnay
- 2015–16 (Republic of Ireland) Pádraig Amond
- 2016–17 (England) Danny Andrew
- 2017–18 (Republic of Ireland) James McKeown
- 2018–19 (Republic of Ireland) James McKeown
- 2019–20 No award given
- 2020–21 No award given
- 2021–22 (England) John McAtee
- 2022–23 (Wales) Harry Clifton
- 2023–24 (England) Danny Rose
- 2024–25 (England) George McEachran
- 2025–26 (England) Harvey Rodgers

=== Young Player of the Year ===
As voted for by supporters of the club.

- 1974–75 (England) Ian Walton
- 1975–75 (England) Tony Ford
- 1976–77 (England) Kevin Drinkell
- 1977–78 (England) Shaun Mawer
- 1978–79 (England) David Moore
- 1979–80 (England) Phil Crosby
- 1980–81 (England) Andy O'Dell
- 1981–82 (England) John Steeples
- 1982–83 (England) Paul Wilkinson
- 1983–84 (England) Gary Lund
- 1984–85 (England) Andy Moore
- 1985–86 (England) Tony Barratt
- 1986–87 (England) John McDermott
- 1987–88 (England) Tommy Watson
- 1988–89 (England) Mark Lever
- 1989–90 (England) John McDermott
- 1990–91 (England) Mark Lever
- 1991–92 (England) John McDermott
- 1992–93 (England) Gary Croft
- 1993–94 (England) Gary Croft
- 1994–95 (England) Gary Croft
- 1995–96 (England) Jamie Forrester
- 1996–97 (Wales) John Oster
- 1997–98 (Republic of Ireland) Daryl Clare
- 1998–99 (England) Danny Butterfield
- 1999–2000 (England) Danny Butterfield
- 2000–01 (England) Jonathan Rowan
- 2001–02 (Jamaica) Simon Ford
- 2002–03 (England) Darren Mansaram
- 2003–04 (England) Graham Hockless
- 2004–05 (England) Nick Hegarty
- 2005–06 (England) Gary Cohen
- 2006–07 (England) Danny North
- 2007–08 (England) Ryan Bennett
- 2008–09 (England) Ryan Bennett
- 2010–11 (England) Bradley Wood
- 2011–12 (England) Conor Townsend
- 2012–13 (Albania) Andi Thanoj
- 2013–14 (Albania) Andi Thanoj
- 2014–15 (England) Craig Clay
- 2015–16 (England) Jon Nolan
- 2016–17 (England) Calum Dyson
- 2017–18 (Wales) Harry Clifton
- 2018–19 (Wales) Harry Clifton
- 2021–22 (England) John McAtee
- 2022–23 (England) Evan Khouri
- 2023–24 (England) Harvey Cartwright
- 2024–25 (England) Evan Khouri
- 2025–26 (Albania) Maldini Kacurri

=== Top goal scorers ===
Player	Goals	Season
(Republic of Ireland) Jaze Kabia	18	2025–26
(England) Danny Rose	14	2024–25
(England) Danny Rose	13	2023–24
(England) Harry Clifton	7	2022–23
(England) John McAtee	14	2021–22
(England) Lenell John-Lewis	4	2020–21
(England) James Hanson	9	2019–20
(England) Wes Thomas	12	2018–19
(England) Mitch Rose	8	2017–18
(England) Omar Bogle	19	2016–17
(Republic of Ireland) Pádraig Amond	30	2015–16
(England) Lenell John-Lewis	20	2014–15
(England) Ross Hannah	15	2013–14
(England) Andy Cook	16	2012–13
(England) Liam Hearn	29	2011–12
(England) Alan Connell	29	2010–11
(Scotland) Peter Sweeney	6	2009–10
(England) Adam Proudlock	9	2008–09
(England) Danny North	10	2007–08
(England) Gary Jones, (Northern Ireland) Ciarán Toner and (England) Peter Bore	8	2006–07
(England) Gary Jones	17	2005–06
(Republic of Ireland) Michael Reddy and (England) Andy Parkinson	9	2004–05
(England) Phil Jevons and (England) Michael Boulding	12	2003–04
(Scotland) Stuart Campbell	7	2002–03
(England) Michael Boulding	11	2001–02
(England) Steve Livingstone	7	2000–01
(England) Lee Ashcroft	12	1999–00
(England) Paul Groves	14	1998–99
(England) Kevin Donovan	16	1997–98
(England) Clive Mendonca	19	1996–97
(England) Paul Groves and (England) Steve Livingstone	10	1995–96
(England) Neil Woods	14	1994–95
(England) Clive Mendonca	14	1993–94
(England) Paul Groves	12	1992–93
(England) Neil Woods	8	1991–92
(England) Dave Gilbert and (England) Neil Woods	12	1990–91
(England) Tony Rees	13	1989–90
(Saint Lucia) Keith Alexander	14	1988–89
(England) Marc North	11	1987–88
(Republic of Ireland) Don O'Riordan and (Wales) Ian Walsh	8	1986–87
(England) Gordon Hobson	15	1985–86
(England) Kevin Drinkell and (England) Gary Lund	14	1984–85
(England) Kevin Drinkell	14	1983–84
(England) Kevin Drinkell	17	1982–83
(England) Trevor Whymark	11	1981–82
(Scotland) Bobby Cumming	11	1980–81
(England) Kevin Drinkell	16	1979–80
(England) Tony Ford	16	1978–79
(Republic of Ireland) Terry Donovan	14	1977–78
(England) Malcolm Partridge	11	1976–77
(Wales) Jack Lewis	15	1975–76
(Wales) Jack Lewis	21	1974–75
(Wales) Jack Lewis	13	1973–74
(England) Phil Hubbard	10	1973–74
(England) Stuart Brace	18	1972–73
(Scotland) Matt Tees	27	1971–72
(Scotland) Matt Tees	10	1970–71
(England) Stuart Brace	25	1969–70
(England) Stuart Brace	10	1968–69
(England) Dave Wilson	12	1967–68
(England) Rodney Green	12	1966–67
(Scotland) Matt Tees	28	1965–66
(Scotland) George McLean	19	1964–65
(England) Cliff Portwood	11	1963–64
(Scotland) George McLean	15	1962–63
(England) Ron Rafferty	34	1961–62
(England) Ron Rafferty	24	1960–61
(England) Ralph Hunt	33	1959–60
(England) Ron Rafferty	19	1958–59
(England) Ron Rafferty	26	1957–58
(Northern Ireland) Jackie Scott	11	1956–57
(Scotland) Bob Crosbie	35	1955–56
(Scotland) Arthur Hughes	11	1954–55

*Current season

== Notable players ==
=== Captains ===
Years	Captain
1878–1881	(England) Charles Horn
1881–1883	(England) Rev. J.Flowers
1883–1886	(England) G.Kimpson
1885–1887	(England) G.Atkinson
1887–1890	(England) Robert Macbeth
1890–1891	(England) Jimmy Lundie
1891–1892	(England) Rasmal Gray
1892–1894	(England) Jimmy Lundie
1894–1898	(England) Billy Lindsay
1898–1900	(Scotland) Paddy Gray
1900–1902	(Scotland) Joe Leiper
1902–1904	(Scotland) Dave Gardner
1904–1905	(England) Alf Nelmes
1905–1907	(England) Herbert Morley
1907–1908	(England) Harry Fletcher
1908–1909	(Scotland) Andrew Davidson
1909–1911	(England) 'Chopper' Lee

Years	Captain
1911–1914	(England) Sid Wheelhouse
1923–1925	(Scotland) Jimmy Carmichael
1914–1919	No competitive football due to the First World War
1919–1920	(Scotland) David Kenny
1920–1921	(England) Wilf Gillow
1921–1923	(England) Charles Deacey
1925–1927	(England) Jack Hardy
1927–1928	(England) Charlie Wrack
1928–1932	(Scotland) Jock Priestley
1932–1937	(England) Jackie Bestall
1937–1939	(England) Alec Hall
1939–1946	No competitive football due to the Second World War
1946–1948	(England) Harry Clifton
1948–1950	(England) Billy Cairns
1950–1951	(England) Dick Conner
1951–1952	(England) Bill Brown
1955–1956	(England) Allenby Chilton

Years	Captain
1956–1958	(England) Bill Brown
1959–1960	(England) Dick Conner
1959–1964	(England) Keith Jobling
1964–1968	(England) Graham Taylor
1968–1970	(Wales) Graham Rathbone
1970–1972	(England) Dave Worthington
1973–1977	(England) Dave Booth
1977–1984	(England) Joe Waters
1984–1987	(England) Kevin Moore
1987	(England) Mick Halsall
1987–1988	(Republic of Ireland) Don O'Riordan
1988–1989	(Scotland) Tommy Williams
1989–1992	(England) Shaun Cunnington
1992–1993	(England) Graham Rodger
1993–1996	(England) Paul Groves
1996–1997	(England) Mark Lever

Years	Captain
1997–2004	(England) Paul Groves
2004–2008	(England) Justin Whittle
2008	(England) Matthew Heywood
2008–2009	(England) Tom Newey
2009	(England) Ryan Bennett
2009–2010	(Republic of Ireland) Nick Colgan
2010–2011	(Scotland) Lee Peacock
2011–2012	(England) Darran Kempson
2012–2017	(England) Craig Disley
2017–2018	(England) Nathan Clarke
2018	(England) John Welsh
2018–2019	(Wales) Danny Collins
2019–2021	(Republic of Ireland) James McKeown
2021–2022	(England) Giles Coke
2022–2024	(England) Luke Waterfall
2024–2026	(England) Danny Rose
2026–	(England) Kieran Green

=== Top flight players ===
The following players have played in a major top flight league and have moved to Grimsby Town later in their career.

- (England) Bradley Allen
- (Wales) Darren Barnard
- (England) Peter Beagrie
- (England) Dave Beasant
- (England) David Beharall
- (England) Garry Birtles
- (Northern Ireland) Kingsley Black
- (Italy) Ivano Bonetti
- (England) Marlon Broomes
- (England) Wayne Burnett
- (England) Peter Butler
- (Scotland) Stuart Campbell
- (Netherlands) Marcel Cas
- (England) Steve Chettle
- (Republic of Ireland) Nick Colgan
- (Wales) Danny Collins
- (England) Terry Cooke
- (England) Gary Crosby
- (Northern Ireland) Aidan Davison
- (Scotland) Willie Falconer
- (England) Jamie Forrester
- (Italy) Enzo Gambaro
- (England) Dean Gordon
- (France) Elliot Grandin
- (England) Des Hamilton
- (England) Bryan Hughes
- (Canada) Simeon Jackson
- (England) Michael Jeffrey
- (England) Nigel Jemson
- (England) Phil Jevons
- (Democratic Republic of the Congo) Jean-Paul Kalala
- (England) Jake Kean
- (Jamaica) Jamie Lawrence
- (England) Brian Laws
- (England) Jason Lee
- (England) Steve Livingstone
- (Trinidad and Tobago) Clint Marcelle
- (England) Gary McSheffrey
- (Wales) Alan Neilson
- (England) Mark Nicholls
- (Denmark) David Nielsen
- (Sweden) Ludvig Öhman
- (Sweden) Martin Pringle
- (England) Isaiah Rankin
- (Republic of Ireland) Michael Reddy
- (England) Paul Robinson
- (England) Steve Slade
- (England) David Smith
- (England) Richard Smith
- (Scotland) Robbie Stockdale
- (England) Andy Todd
- (England) Paul Warhurst
- (England) Vance Warner
- (England) Neil Webb
- (England) John Welsh
- (England) Tommy Widdrington
- (Netherlands) Menno Willems
- (England) Curtis Woodhouse
- (China) Zhang Enhua

The following players have gone on to play top flight football in a major league after first playing with Grimsby Town.

- (England) Ryan Bennett
- (England) Omar Bogle
- (England) Michael Boulding
- (England) Danny Butterfield
- (Wales) Danny Coyne
- (Scotland) Siriki Dembele
- (England) Gary Croft
- (England) Akin Famewo
- (England) Simon Francis
- (England) Dean Henderson
- (Scotland) Richard Hughes
- (England) Charlie I'Anson
- (England) Steve Kabba
- (England) Shay Logan
- (England) Clive Mendonca
- (Wales) John Oster
- (Northern Ireland) Martin Paterson
- (England) Nicky Southall
- (England) Easah Suliman
- (United States) John Thorrington
- (England) Conor Townsend
- (England) Paul Trollope
- (England) Paul Wilkinson

=== International players ===
Players signed to, and have played for Grimsby Town that have had full international caps during their careers.

Albania

- (Albania) Maldini Kacurri

Antigua and Barbuda

- (Antigua and Barbuda) Rhys Browne

Australia

- (Australia) Nick Rizzo

Barbados

- (Barbados) Louie Soares

Canada

- (Canada) Simeon Jackson

Cape Verde Islands

- (Cape Verde) Georges Santos

China

- (China) Zhang Enhua

Congo DR

- (Democratic Republic of the Congo) Jean-Paul Kalala
- (Democratic Republic of the Congo) Aristote Nsiala

England

- (England) Joseph Bache
- (England) Dave Beasant
- (England) Jackie Bestall
- (England) Harry Betmead
- (England) Garry Birtles
- (England) Allenby Chilton
- (England) Tom Galley
- (England) Tommy Gardner
- (England) Dean Henderson
- (England) George Tweedy
- (England) Neil Webb
- (England) Trevor Whymark

Faroe Islands

- (Faroe Islands) Géza Dávid Turi

Grenada

- (Grenada) Anthony Straker

Guadeloupe

- (Guadeloupe) Mickaël Antoine-Curier

Ghana

- (Ghana) Will Antwi

Guinea-Bissau

- (Guinea-Bissau) Arnaud Mendy

Hong Kong

- (Hong Kong) Charlie Wright

Iceland

- (Iceland) Jason Daði Svanþórsson

Ireland

- (Ireland) Billy Andrews
- (Ireland) Harry Baird
- (Ireland) Jackie Coulter
- (Ireland) Peter Doherty
- (Ireland) Allan Elleman
- (Ireland) Jimmy McStay

Jamaica

- (Jamaica) Simon Ford
- (Jamaica) Joel Grant
- (Jamaica) Jamie Lawrence

Montserrat

- (Montserrat) Junior Mendes
- (Montserrat) Brandon Comley

New Zealand

- (New Zealand) Jason Batty
- (New Zealand) Max Crocombe
- (New Zealand) Dave Mulligan

Northern Ireland

- (Northern Ireland) Kingsley Black
- (Northern Ireland) Aidan Davison
- (Northern Ireland) Stuart Elliott
- (Northern Ireland) Alan Fettis
- (Northern Ireland) Josh Magennis
- (Northern Ireland) Chris Nicholl
- (Northern Ireland) Martin Paterson
- (Northern Ireland) Jackie Scott
- (Northern Ireland) Ciarán Toner

Nigeria

- (Nigeria) Chima Okorie

Pakistan

- (Pakistan) Otis Khan
- (Pakistan) Easah Suliman

Republic of Ireland

- (Republic of Ireland) Nick Colgan
- (Republic of Ireland) Don Donovan
- (Republic of Ireland) Terry Donovan
- (Republic of Ireland) Wayne Henderson
- (Republic of Ireland) Pat Johnston
- (Republic of Ireland) Jimmy McStay
- (Republic of Ireland) George Moulson
- (Republic of Ireland) Joe Waters

Saint Kitts and Nevis

- (Saint Kitts and Nevis) Des Hazel

Saint Lucia

- (Saint Lucia) Keith Alexander

Scotland

- (Scotland) David Black
- (Scotland) Mick Cullen
- (Scotland) Paul Dixon
- (Scotland) Hughie Gallacher
- (Scotland) Dave Gardner
- (Scotland) Richard Hughes
- (Scotland) James Lundie
- (Scotland) Robbie Stockdale

Sierra Leone

- (Sierra Leone) Kamil Conteh
- (Sierra Leone) Malvin Kamara

South Africa

- (South Africa) Mike Rowbotham

Sweden

- (Sweden) Martin Pringle

Thailand

- (Thailand) Jude Soonsup-Bell

Trinidad & Tobago

- (Trinidad and Tobago) Clint Marcelle

Tunisia

- (Tunisia) Idris El Mizouni
- (Tunisia) Bilel Mohsni

United States of America

- (United States) John Thorrington

Wales

- (Wales) Darren Barnard
- (Wales) Thomas Chapman
- (Wales) Dai Collier
- (Wales) Danny Collins
- (Wales) Danny Coyne
- (Wales) David Felgate
- (Wales) Pat Glover
- (Wales) Chris Llewellyn
- (Wales) Hugh Morris
- (Wales) Dickie Morris
- (Wales) Alan Neilson
- (Wales) Lee Nogan
- (Wales) John Oster
- (Wales) Tony Rees
- (Wales) Ian Walsh
- (Wales) George Williams

=== PFA Fans' Favourites ===
The following was included as the favourite Grimsby Town player in the a survey published by the Professional Footballers' Association in December 2007.

- (Scotland) Matt Tees

=== BBC Sports Cult Heroes ===
The following were chosen by fans as the favourite club heroes in the BBC Sports Cult Heroes poll in 2006.

1. (England) Clive Mendonca
2. (England) John McDermott
3. (Italy) Ivano Bonetti
