= 1948–49 Hull City A.F.C. season =

English football club season

Hull City
1948–49 season
- Chairman: Harold Needler
- Manager: Raich Carter (Note: Player-manager)
- Stadium: Boothferry Park
- Third Division North: 1st (promoted)
- FA Cup: Sixth round
- Top goalscorer: League: Norman Moore (22); All: Norman Moore (28)
Home colours	Away colours

The 1948–49 season was the 45th season in the history of Hull City Association Football Club and their sixth consecutive season in the Third Division North, when not including the abandoned 1939–40 campaign. In addition to the domestic league, the club would also participate in the FA Cup.

== Summary ==
Following the resignation of Major Frank Buckley prior to the end of the previous season, future English Football Hall of Fame inductee Raich Carter was promoted to become player-manager of Hull City. It was under his guidance that the Tigers would endure their first great success since the end of the Second World War. In 1948–49, Hull topped the Third Division North, only the second title in the club's history.

In addition to their league performance, the Tigers also proved strong competitors in the FA Cup. After surpassing opposition from both the third and second tiers, Hull were drawn against First Division side Stoke City in the fifth round. On 12 February 1949, they beat the Potters 2–0 at the Victoria Ground with goals from Norman Moore and Jimmy Greenhalgh. In the following round, Hull met eventual First Division runners-up Manchester United on 26 February. Led by Sir Matt Busby, the Red Devils would claim a narrow victory thanks to a Stan Pearson goal. Despite this, the day is still noteworthy for Hull as a crowd of 55,019 attended the match at Boothferry Park. Even today, this total remains the highest recorded attendance for any home fixture in the club's history.

== Competitions ==
=== Third Division North ===
==== League table ====
Pos	Team	Pld	W	D	L	GF	GA	GAv	Pts	Promotion
1	Hull City (C, P)	42	27	11	4	93	28	3.321	65	Promotion to the Second Division
2	Rotherham United	42	28	6	8	90	46	1.957	62	
3	Doncaster Rovers	42	20	10	12	53	40	1.325	50	
4	Darlington	42	20	6	16	83	74	1.122	46	
5	Gateshead	42	16	13	13	69	58	1.190	45	

Source: rsssf.com
(C) Champions; (P) Promoted

==== Matches ====
Win Draw Loss

#	Date	Home	Result	Away	Venue	Att.	Scorers (Note: Hull scorers only)
1	21.08.48	Tranmere Rovers	1–2	Hull City	A	10,107	Harrison, Moore
2	26.08.48	Hull City	6–0	Oldham Athletic	H	32,679	Carter (2), Greenhalgh, Harrison, Moore (2)
3	28.08.48	Hull City	4–0	Mansfield Town	H	34,075	Moore (2), Buchan, Harrison
4	04.09.48	Barrow	1–2	Hull City	A	12,759	Burbanks, Conway
5	09.09.48	Hull City	3–1	Accrington Stanley	H	33,512	Carter, Conway, Durham
6	11.09.48	Hull City	3–0	Wrexham	H	32,075	Moore (2), Buchan
7	18.09.48	Halifax Town	2–4	Hull City	A	18,563	Moore, Greenhalgh, Burbanks, Harrison
8	25.09.48	Hull City	2–0	Bradford City	H	36,207	Carter, Burbanks
9	28.09.48	Accrington Stanley	1–2	Hull City	A	13,162	Burbanks, Harrison
10	02.10.48	Doncaster Rovers	0–0	Hull City	A	37,099	
11	09.10.48	Hartlepools United	0–2	Hull City	A	17,118	Burbanks, Moore
12	16.10.48	Hull City	0–1	Darlington	H	43,801	
13	23.10.48	Rochdale	1–1	Hull City	A	14,967	Harrison
14	30.10.48	Hull City	4–1	New Brighton	H	31,039	Moore, Carter, Burbanks, Jensen
15	06.11.48	Chester City	0–2	Hull City	A	13,509	Carter, Jensen
16	13.11.48	Hull City	5–1	Southport	H	25,215	Carter, Burbanks (2), Moore, Jensen
17	20.11.48	Crewe Alexandra	0–0	Hull City	A	11,138	
18	04.12.48	Stockport County	0–0	Hull City	A	15,049	
19	25.12.48	Hull City	3–2	Rotherham United	H	49,655	Buchan (2), Bloxham
20	27.12.48	Rotherham United	0–0	Hull City	A	22,159	
21	01.01.49	Mansfield Town	1–1	Hull City	A	11,735	Buchan
22	15.01.49	Hull City	3–0	Barrow	H	26,881	Carter, Price (2)
23	22.01.49	Wrexham	0–2	Hull City	A	18,551	Greenhalgh, Price
24	05.02.49	Hull City	6–0	Halifax Town	H	37,114	Jensen (3), Buchan (2), Mellor
25	19.02.49	Bradford City	4–2	Hull City	A	27,083	Harrison, Jensen
26	05.03.49	Hull City	2–0	Hartlepools United	H	35,357	Carter, Price
27	12.03.49	Darlington	0–1	Hull City	A	17,978	Shepherd
28	19.03.49	Hull City	1–1	Rochdale	H	36,509	Price
29	23.03.49	Hull City	3–0	Carlisle United	H	36,864	Carter, (o.g.), Moore
30	26.03.49	New Brighton	0–0	Hull City	A	8,650	
31	30.03.49	Hull City	2–0	Tranmere Rovers	H	33,008	Harrison (2)
32	02.04.49	Hull City	3–2	Chester City	H	36,167	Jensen, Moore (2)
33	06.04.49	Hull City	2–3	York City	H	40,002	Moore, Carter
34	09.04.49	Southport	0–0	Hull City	A	10,010	
35	15.04.49	Hull City	2–0	Gateshead	H	43,795	Harrison, Jensen
36	16.04.49	Hull City	5–0	Crewe Alexandra	H	38,089	Moore (2), Jensen (2), Burbanks
37	18.04.49	Gateshead	0–2	Hull City	A	17,538	Moore, Harrison
38	23.04.49	York City	1–3	Hull City	A	21,010	Jensen, Carter, Moore
39	26.04.49	Oldham Athletic	1–1	Hull City	A	35,200	Harrison
40	30.04.49	Hull City	6–1	Stockport County	H	38,192	Moore (3), Carter (2), Jensen
41	04.05.49	Hull City	0–1	Doncaster Rovers	H	46,725	
42	07.05.49	Carlisle United	1–1	Hull City	A	15,519	Jensen

=== FA Cup ===
==== Matches ====
Win Draw Loss

#	Date	Home	Result	Away	Venue	Att.	Scorers
1R	27.11.48	Hull City	3–1	Accrington Stanley	H	21,926	Carter (2), Jensen
2R	11.12.48	Hull City	0–0	Reading	H	29,692	
2R	18.12.48	Reading	1–2	Hull City	A	21,920	Moore (2)
3R	08.01.49	Blackburn Rovers	1–2	Hull City	A	33,200	Buchan, Moore
4R	29.01.49	Grimsby Town	2–3	Hull City	A	26,505	Moore (2), Carter
5R	12.02.49	Stoke City	0–2	Hull City	A	46,738	Moore, Greenhalgh
6R	26.02.49	Hull City	0–1	Manchester United	H	55,019	

== Squad ==
Name	Position	Nationality	Place of birth	Date of birth (age) (Note: Players' ages listed as they were on 1 July 1948, the official start date of the 1948–49 season)	Previous club	Date signed	Fee
Goalkeepers
Billy Bly	GK	ENG	Walker	15 May 1920 (age 28)	Walker Celtic	July 1937	Unknown
Alec Corbett	GK	SCO	Saltcoats	20 April 1921 (age 27)	New Brighton	January 1948	Unknown
Joe Robinson	GK	ENG	Morpeth	4 March 1919 (age 29)	Blackpool	February 1949	Unknown
Defenders
Tom Berry	FB	ENG	Clayton-le-Moors	31 March 1922 (age 26)	Oxford City	July 1947	Unknown
Denis Durham	HB	ENG	East Halton	26 September 1923 (age 24)	East Halton United	March 1947	Free
Norman Fowler	FB	ENG	Stockton-on-Tees	3 September 1919 (age 28)	Middlesbrough	September 1946	Free
Jimmy Greenhalgh	HB	ENG	Manchester	25 August 1923 (age 24)	Unattached	July 1946	Free
Harold Meens	HB	ENG	Rotherham	15 October 1919 (age 28)	Unattached	October 1936	Free
Allan Mellor	HB	ENG	Droylsden	16 October 1921 (age 26)	Ashton United	June 1947	Unknown
Jack Taylor	FB	ENG	Barnsley	15 February 1914 (age 34)	Norwich City	July 1947	Unknown
Ken White	HB	ENG	Selby	15 March 1922 (age 26)	Selby Town	December 1947	Unknown
John Wright	HB	ENG	South Shields	16 November 1922 (age 25)	Tyne Dock United	June 1947	Free
Attackers
Jimmy Bloomer	IF	SCO	Rutherglen	10 April 1926 (age 22)	(Scotland) Strathclyde	February 1948	Unknown
Alec Bloxham	OF	ENG	Pleasley	2 July 1920 (age 27)	Ollerton Colliery	October 1947	Unknown
Willie Buchan	IF	SCO	Grangemouth	17 October 1914 (age 33)	Blackpool	January 1948	£6,000
Eddie Burbanks	OF	ENG	Campsall	1 April 1913 (age 35)	Sunderland	June 1948	Unknown
Raich Carter	IF	ENG	Hendon	21 December 1913 (age 34)	Derby County	1 April 1948	£6,000
Andy Conway	IF	ENG	South Shields	17 February 1923 (age 25)	North Shields	June 1947	Unknown
Ken Harrison	OF	ENG	Stockton-on-Tees	20 January 1926 (age 22)	Billingham Synthonia	March 1947	Unknown
Wilf Hassall	IF	ENG	Manchester	23 September 1923 (age 24)	Unattached	June 1946	Free
Viggo Jensen	IF	DEN	Skagen	9 March 1921 (age 27)	(Denmark) Esbjerg fB	October 1948	Unknown
George King	CF	ENG	Warkworth	5 January 1923 (age 25)	Newcastle United	March 1948	Unknown
Norman Moore	CF	ENG	Grimsby	15 October 1919 (age 28)	Grimsby Town	May 1947	Unknown
Billy Price	CF	ENG	Hadley	10 April 1917 (age 31)	Reading	January 1949	£4,000
Ernie Shepherd	OF	ENG	Wombwell	14 August 1919 (age 28)	West Bromwich Albion	March 1949	Unknown
