= Alan Barnett =

Alan Barnett(e) may refer to:

- Alan Barnett (footballer) (1934–1978), English former professional football goalkeeper
- Alan Barnett (motorcyclist), English former Grand Prix motorcycle road racer
- Alan Barnette from Off Limits (1988 film)
