= John Steeples =

English footballer (1959–2019)

Personal information
- Full name: John Steeples
- Date of birth: 28 April 1959
- Place of birth: Doncaster, England
- Date of death: 20 March 2019 (aged 59)
- Position: Forward

Senior career*
Years	Team	Apps	(Gls)
1979–1980	Pilkington Recreation		
1980–1983	Grimsby Town	7	(0)
1982	→ Torquay United (loan)	5	(0)
1983	Scarborough	24	(4)
1985	Grantham	0	(0)
- * Club domestic league appearances and goals

John Steeples (28 April 1959 – 20 March 2019) was an English former professional footballer who played as a forward. His death was announced on 21 March 2019.

== Honours ==
Grimsby Town

- Football League Group Cup: 1981–82
