= Nelmes =

Nelmes is an English surname.

From the old English meaning, "near the elms".

Notable persons with this name include:

- Alan Nelmes (born 1948), English footballer
- Alf Nelmes (1871–1940), English footballer
- Barry Nelmes
- Peter "The Lion" Nelmes (1960-2024), Bermudian
- Ernest Nelmes (1895–1959), British botanist
- Lemuel Dole Nelme (c. 1718 – 1786), English craftsman and language theorist
- Nuatali Nelmes, Australian politician
