= Philip Crosby =

Philip Crosby may refer to:

- Phil Crosby (footballer) (born 1962), English footballer
- Philip B. Crosby (1926–2001), businessman and author
- Phil Crosby (American football) (born 1976), American football player
- Phillip Crosby (1934–2004), singer, son of Bing Crosby
