= Peninsula Strikers FC =

Peninsula Strikers
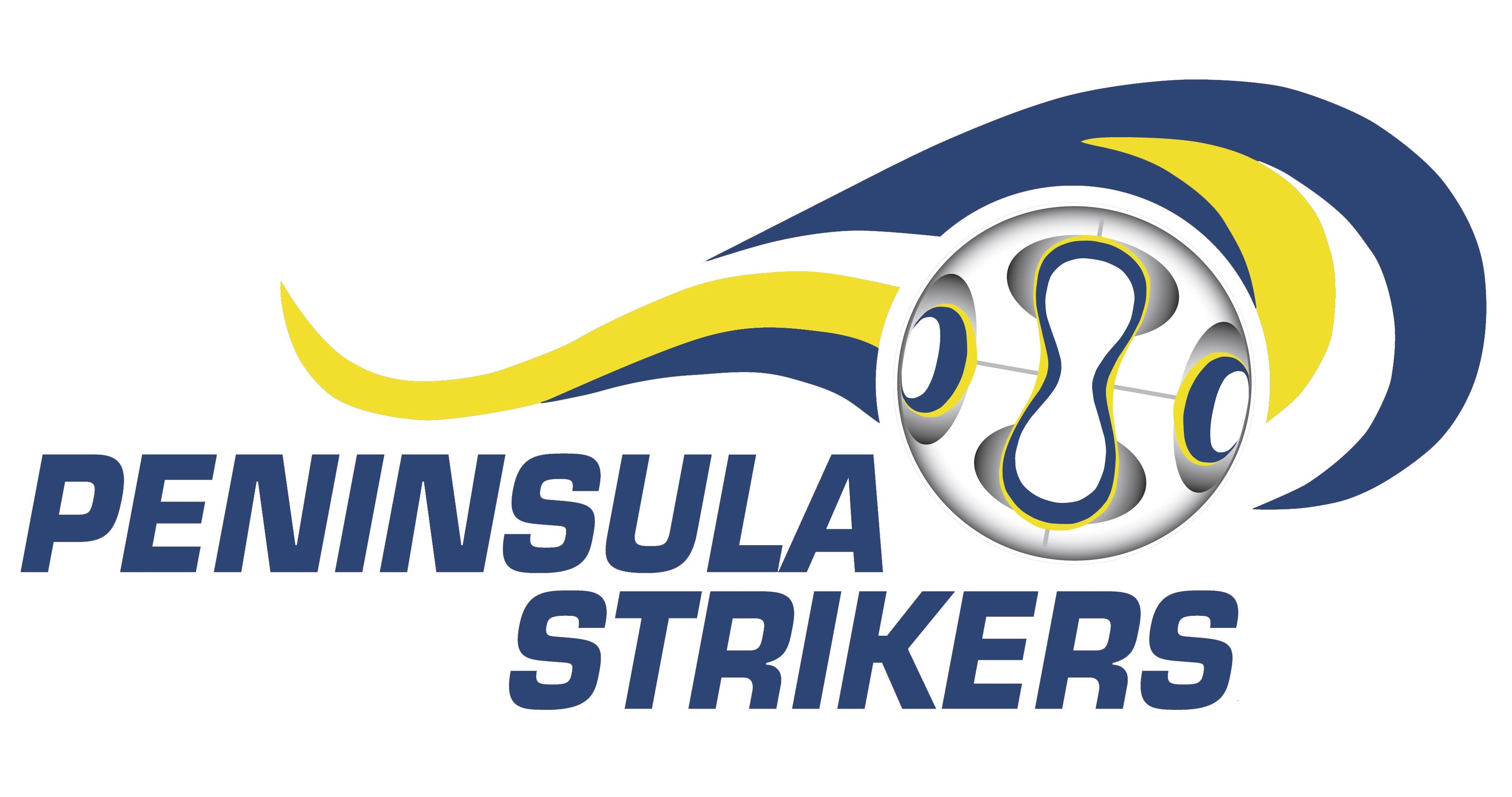
- Full name: Peninsula Strikers Football Club
- Nickname: Strikers
- Founded: 1975
- Ground: Centanary Park
- Capacity: 1500
- Manager: Donn Delany
- League: Victorian State League Division 2
- Website: http://www.peninsulastrikers.com.au
Home colours	Away colours

Peninsula Strikers Football Club is an Australian soccer club based in Melbourne, Victoria, currently playing in the Victorian State League Division 2. Predominantly supported by residents of Frankston, Victoria, where they play at Centenary Park. Peninsula Strikers also have a junior club by the name of Peninsula Strikers Junior FC. In 2019, Peninsula Strikers Junior FC was one of the thirteen new teams added to the Junior Boys National Premier Leagues competition in Victoria.

They were founded in 1975 as Karingal United Soccer Club.

== History ==
Peninsula Strikers FC

Frankston Strikers Soccer Club was formed officially in December 1993 with the amalgamation of 25-year-old Karingal United Soccer Club, 6-year-old Frankston United Soccer Club, and Frankston United Junior Soccer Club.

Talks between committee members from all clubs began many months before that, and their main aims were to unify fragmented soccer interests in the Frankston area, provide better facilities for members and their families, and open opportunities for advancement for the club.

=== 1993 ===
Meetings were held on 6 October 1993 when the decision to amalgamate was made by majority vote by all three clubs. The final annual general meetings were held a short time later in support of the amalgamation.

On Friday, 26 November 1993, the inaugural general meeting of the new club was held in the McClelland Drive Clubrooms. A steering committee was formed comprising members from all clubs, with the goal of guiding the club through its first year. Frankston Soccer Club officially ceased operation on 1 December 1993.

The first business of the steering committee was to create a new image for the club, resulting in the name change to Frankston Strikers Soccer Club and new club colours of green and gold. The enthusiasm generated by the merger was evident in the support being received from the Victorian Soccer Federation, the Frankston city and local council, and government representatives, with the city council showing their support and confidence in the new club with an extensive renovation and upgrade of the ground.

=== 1995–2006 ===
In 1995, Frankston completed a $120,000 restructure of the playing surface at Centenary Park, a dedicated soccer complex of similar design to Lakeside Stadium, the home of the South Melbourne Soccer Club. The club developed member and spectator facilities to ensure that the complex would meet all criteria for promotion through the league system.

The club took its first steps toward reaching its aims by earning promotion from Division 4 in 1994 to State League Division 3 in 1995, where they finished the season in third position. The club won the 1996 Division 3 Premiership, earning a promotion to Division 2.

They finished third in Division 2 in 1997, fifth in 1998, fourth in 1999, and first in 2000, earning a promotion to Division 1.

They finished 11th in Division 1 in 2001 and were relegated back down to Division 2.

They finished eighth in Division 2 South-East in 2002, fourth in 2003, and 11th in 2004, getting relegated to Division 3 South-East.

They finished 10th in Division 3 South-East 2005 and 11th in 2006.

The local community showed their support through high attendance at home games at Centenary Park. Additionally, major long-term commitments had been developed with several large sponsors.

=== 2007 ===
At the club's annual general meeting, it was announced that there had been discussions with Peninsula Junior Soccer Club about re-amalgamation, which would guarantee a strong junior club and the possibility that some of those players would eventually play for the senior squad.

Over the next few months, the area faced a drought, and all watering of grounds was prohibited; as a result, the grass died, and the local council informed the club that for 2007 they would be relocated to Ballam Park.

=== 2008 ===
The club returned to their home ground after the city council put drought-resistant summer grass on the field.

A number of players retired or accepted offers from other clubs, forcing Strikers to sign replacements. Unfortunately, this upheaval led to a disappointing season, finishing bottom of the league and earning relegation to the third division.

=== 2009 ===
Henry Negus scored 17 goals in the club's relegation season, helping them earn a fourth-place finish. After the season ended, the club lost both senior coaches and a good number of players.

Billy Armour, who had been signed by the club in the latter part of 2009, was appointed player-coach for the coming season.

=== 2011 ===
2011 saw Billy Wright, an ex-New Zealand international, appointed as coach. Billy had previously coached Nunawading, which was also in the league. Wright was to bring a few players with him, but some left after a few weeks of first-team training. Once again, there was a turnover in players during pre-season, so more needed to be signed. They struggled through the season, finishing near the bottom of the league.

=== 2012 ===
Jamie Skelly, who had played in the title-winning team of a few years ago, was appointed coach for 2012. A young coach who had learned his trade as Langwarrin's under-21 coach. He brought with him many players from that club, and this time they would stay for the season. Despite mixed results throughout the season and a multitude of injuries, they still finished in the top half of the league.

=== 2013 ===
Jamie Skelly, assured of his position by the previous committee, was ousted by the new committee, who thought a change in direction was the way to go. Former youth coach Dave Reid was appointed instead, with the idea that fielding a team of youngsters who came up through the club's junior ranks would help with their results. At the same time, a number of players left in protest of Skelly's dismissal. Things did not pan out, and they had to win a playoff against Sandringham to remain in the league, successfully fighting off relegation.

=== 2014 ===
Having been reappointed for 2014, Dave Reid managed to secure some new players for the club. At the halfway mark of the season, Dave Reid tendered his resignation, and Billy Rae was appointed the new coach. At the end of the season, they found themselves second bottom on the ladder and once again facing relegation. However, the Eastern Lions decided to join the new Victorian soccer competition, the National Premier Leagues Victoria 2. They had canvassed other clubs into joining the league that was entering its second season. Nunawading, who finished below the Strikers, also decided to join. The Lions' move meant there was a vacancy that the Strikers could fill and stay in the same league, avoiding relegation.

=== 2015 ===
The club's new committee also decided on appointing a new coach, Craig Lewis, who gained a lot of respect as a player at Strikers some years ago. Very few players from either the first or the reserve squads from 2014 came back, and, in desperation, Lewis began to seek new players through contacts that he had. He successfully brought in players, and by the time the season began, Strikers had a full first squad. Lewis established some stability in the club, though it would not be a very good season. Still, the club finished mid-table, which, with everything that had occurred throughout the season, was an excellent result.

However, the usually successful reserve side struggled all season, on some occasions not even able to field a full side. Billy Buchanan, who had returned from Scotland during the year, took over the coaching role when Jimmy Stewart decided to relinquish the job.

=== 2016 ===
Craig Lewis was reappointed as coach and Billy Buchanan as assistant coach. Former players Mark Duff and Graham Watson took responsibility for coaching the reserve team. The majority of the previous season's squad returned for the season.

Mark "Chopper" Brandon and the committee worked to get new floodlights, the construction of two new pitches behind the grandstand, and extensions to the clubrooms, including additional changing facilities.

The club introduced a girls' team, which achieved promotion in its first season. The metro team also competed for promotion during the year. The veterans' team won the league and cup double.

=== 2017 ===
Despite much of the preseason rhetoric surrounding promotion, they were relegated for only the second time in the club's history.

Craig Lewis had thought he had found not only the right players, but also a good balance in the squad. For the first time, the club signed three overseas visa players. Of the three, two took on the captain's role and saw out the season. The third signing chose to leave early in the season for more money from another club.

Graham Watson took on the coaching role of the reserve team. Several of the reserve players did get a chance for first-team soccer. Results were very mixed, with some poor team performances.

Dave McKinney coached the youth team in the Metro 4 Division, which included player Josh Vega.

Marty Moore once again coached the girls' team.

=== 2018 ===
The club had four first-team coaches, and only Graham (Winker) Watson remained steadfast in coaching the reserve squad.

Trevor Johnston once again took on the president's job and, together with the committee, appointed Andy O'Dell as the new club coach. He had previously coached Altona City, and everything in the club seemed to be improving. They again acquired visa players, mainly from the UK, and O'Dell brought some players with him. Danny Brooks remained from the previous year's crop of visa players. O'Dell quit before round 1 to return to his previous club, taking some players with him.

This event started a period of frequent head coaching changes and managerial instability for the club that lasted several months.

Jamie Skelly, sacked by Cranbourne Comets, was approached to coach at Strikers again. He brought with him two assistants, Ben Caffrey and Joe Donaghy Jr., but more importantly, seasoned players. Skelly was approached to take on an assistant's role at nearby Langwarrin, an offer he would accept.

The over-35s side had to withdraw from their league due to a lack of players.

=== 2019 ===
Danny Verdun was appointed coach and brought with him his assistant Neil Standish.

== Divisional History ==
2014 – present	Victorian State League 2 South-East
2009- 2013	Victorian State League 3 South-East
2008	Victorian State League 2 South-East
2005 - 2007	Victorian State League 3 South-East
2002 - 2004	Victorian State League 2 South-East
2001	Victorian State League Division 1
1997-2000	Victorian State League Division 2 South-East
1995-1996	Victorian State League Division 3
1994	Victorian State League Division 4

== Achievements ==
League

Division	Champions	Runners Up
Victorian State League 3 South-East	2007, 1996	
Victorian State League Division 2 South-East	2000	
Victorian State League Division 4		1994
Victorian Provisional League Division Two		1990

=== Seaford United ===
These two clubs first met in 1995 in State League Division Three, where both games were draws (2-2 and 3-3). 20 years later, in 2014, they met again in State League Division Two.

In Round 22 in 2016, the Strikers lost 0-8 and received many red cards.

- Games: 8
- Strikers wins: 2
- Seaford wins 3
- Draws: 3
- Strikers goals: 20
- Seaford goals: 31

=== Frankston Pines ===
These 2 clubs first met in 1997 in State League Division 3

- Games: 7
- Strikers wins: 2
- Pines wins: 3
- Draws: 2
- Strikers goals: 9
- Pines goals: 7

== Stadium ==
Peninsula Strikers play at Centenary Park in Frankston.

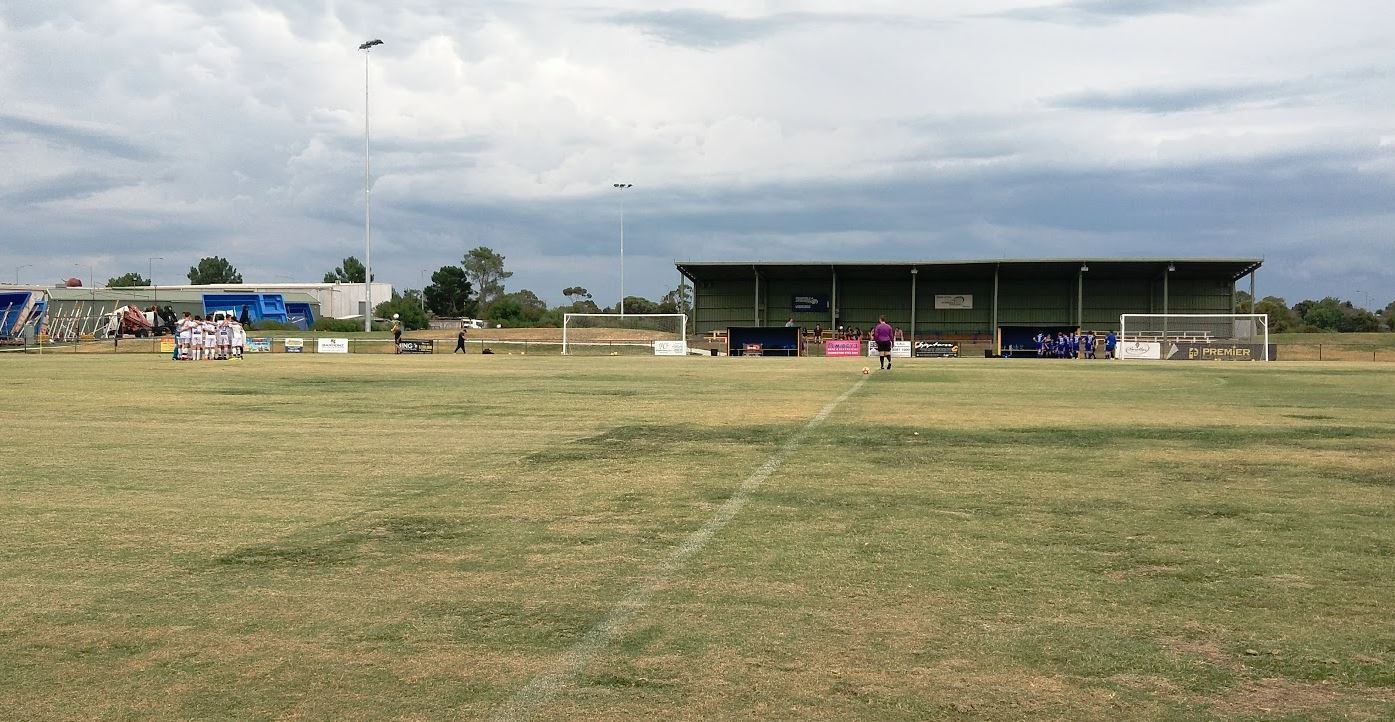
Centenary Park

== Competition timeline ==
Known As	Season	League										Dockerty Cup State Cup Other Cup	Top scorer	
Known As	Season	Division	Pld	W	D	L	GF	GA	+/-	Pts	Position	Dockerty Cup State Cup Other Cup	Player(s)	Goals
Karingal United	1974	Dist South	22	2	4	16	27	91	-64	8	11th			
Karingal United	1975	Dist South	22	8	3	11	47	56	-9	19	7th			
Karingal United	1976	Dist South	22	7	3	12	30	48	-18	17	10th			
Karingal United	1977	Prov2	22	8	4	10	37	36	1	20	7th			
Karingal United	1978	Prov2	22	9	1	12	45	44	1	19	8th			
Skye Rovers	1978	BS Div1	21	10	6	5	63	45	18	26	3rd			
Karingal United	1979	Prov2	20	7	4	9	32	38	-6	18	7th			
Skye Rovers	1979	BS Div1	22	17	3	2	80	34	46	37	2nd			
Karingal United	1980	Prov2	20	7	5	8	48	37	11	19	5th			
Skye Rovers	1980	BS Div1	22	21	1	0	124	25	99	43	1st			
Karingal United	1981	Prov2	22	10	6	6	45	27	18	26	3rd			
Skye Rovers	1981	BS Div1	22	18	0	4	101	34	67	36	2nd			
Karingal United	1982	Prov1	26	15	6	5	42	17	25	36	3rd			
Skye Rovers	1982	BS Div1	16	10	3	3	64	27	37	23	3rd			
Karingal United	1983	Prov4	26	9	10	7	35	35	0	28	7th			
Skye Rovers	1983	BS Div1	18	10	0	8	31	31	0	20	4th			
Karingal United	1984	Prov3	26	11	6	9	43	42	1	28	7th			
Skye Rovers	1984	BS Div1	18	5	4	9	35	54	-19	14	7th			
Karingal United	1985	Div3	26	4	3	19	15	69	-54	11	14th			
Skye Rovers	1985	BS Div2	20	6	3	11	36	72	-36	15	8th			
Karingal United	1986	Div4	24	5	12	7	37	37	0	22	8th			
Skye Rovers	1986	Prov4	26	7	7	12	36	49	-13	21	11th			
Karingal United	1987	Div4	26	7	6	13	36	49	-13	20	12th			
Skye Rovers	1987	Prov4	26	6	8	12	24	39	-15	20	10th			
Karingal United	1988	Div4	22	5	4	13	26	36	-10	14	11th			
Dingley Skye United	1988	Prov2	26	6	8	12	25	37	-12	20	11th			
Karingal United	1989	Div4	26	11	5	10	36	27	9	27	7th			
Frankston United	1989	Prov2	26	4	8	14	24	42	-18	16	12th			
Karingal United	1990	Div4	26	7	8	11	37	45	-8	22	10th			
Frankston United	1990	Prov2	30	22	5	3	76	32	44	49	2nd			
Karingal United	1991	Div4	24	13	6	5	37	29	8	32	4th			
Frankston United	1991	Prov1	26	13	5	8	46	33	13	31	3rd			
Karingal United	1992	Div4	26	10	7	9	42	38	4	27	7th			
Frankston United	1992	Prov1	26	16	3	7	55	30	25	35	4th		Simon Parott	10
Karingal United	1993	Div4	28	8	6	14	31	41	-10	22	12th			
Frankston United	1993	Prov1	26	16	4	6	61	29	32	36	3rd		Simon Parott /Terry Desbois	5
Frankston Strikers	1994	Div4	28	20	5	3	65	29	36	45	2nd	1st round	Gary McMullin	17
Frankston Strikers	1995	Div3	26	15	3	8	71	39	32	48	3rd	3rd Round	Terry Wogan	18
Frankston Strikers	1996	Div3	25	19	2	4	76	29	47	59	1st	3rd Round	Craig Lewis	22
Frankston Strikers	1997	Div2	26	18	1	7	71	34	37	55	3rd		Craig Lewis	26
Frankston Strikers	1998	Div2	26	12	3	11	54	39	15	39	5th		Terry Wogan	11
Frankston Strikers	1999	Div2	26	12	4	10	53	35	18	40	4th		Willie Raynes	14
Frankston Strikers	2000	Div2	22	17	4	1	61	21	40	55	1st		Dale White	27
Frankston Strikers	2001	Div1	22	3	3	16	21	50	-29	12	11th		Chris Traynor	8
Frankston Strikers	2002	Div2	22	7	4	11	22	44	-22	25	8th		Graham Watson / Mathew Mcdermot	4
Frankston Strikers	2003	Div2	22	12	4	6	45	30	15	40	4th		Michael Anderson	11
Frankston Strikers	2004	SL2	22	3	9	10	18	40	-22	18	11th		Trevor Jiohnston	4
Frankston Strikers	2005	SL3	22	6	4	12	26	51	-25	22	10th		Craig Wright	5
Frankston Strikers	2006	SL3	22	5	3	14	21	53	-32	18	10th		Michael Moore	4
Frankston Strikers	2007	SL3	22	15	3	4	57	26	31	48	1st		Simon Odonell	23
Peninsula Strikers	2008	SL2	22	4	3	15	22	46	-24	15	11th		Murat Demirkol	5
Peninsula Strikers	2009	SL3	22	11	5	6	42	30	12	38	4th		Negas Harry	17
Peninsula Strikers	2010	SL3	22	5	7	10	23	42	-19	21	9th		Steven Baxter / Billy Armour	4
Peninsula Strikers	2011	SL3	22	7	4	11	35	58	-23	25	9th	3rd Round	Murat Demirkol	10
Peninsula Strikers	2012	SL3	22	9	3	10	32	34	-2	30	5th	Zone Semi-Finals	Sait Uygar	13
Peninsula Strikers	2013	SL3	22	5	3	14	30	46	-16	18	10th	1st Round	Blake Hicks	7
Peninsula Strikers	2014	SL3	22	6	4	12	27	49	-22	22	11th	2nd Round	Mathew Hames	6
Peninsula Strikers	2015	SL2	22	7	5	10	41	56	-15	26	8th	2nd Round	Amir Osmancevic	12
Peninsula Strikers	2016	SL2	22	7	2	13	34	58	-24	23	9th	4th Round	Matt Morris Thomas	11
Peninsula Strikers	2017	SL2	22	4	5	13	28	50	-22	17	11th	3rd Round	Aziz Behih	7
Peninsula Strikers	2018	SL2	22	6	3	13	36	55	-19	21	9th	4th Round	John Prescott	9
Peninsula Strikers	2019	SL2	22	8	4	10	41	40	1	28	7th	3rd Round	John Prescott	12
Peninsula Strikers	2020	SL2	0	0	0	0	0	0	0	0	NA	3rd Round	No Season	0
Peninsula Strikers	2021	SL2	13	4	3	6	28	24	4	15	8th	4th Round	A Currie/B Doree	10
Peninsula Strikers	2022	SL2	22	12	4	6	39	33	6	40	4th	4th Round	Riley Anderton	10
Peninsula Strikers	2023	SL2	22	10	3	9	42	36	6	33	5th		Riley Anderton	19
Peninsula Strikers	2024	SL2	22	13	6	3	49	21	28	45	3rd		R Anderton/T Wood	10
Peninsula Strikers	2025	SL2	22	13	4	5	46	24	22	43	3rd		C Steedman	15

== Managers ==
- (Australia) Russell Black (1994–2004)
- (Australia) William Armour (2005)
- (Australia) Billy McArthur (2006)
- (Australia) George Hughes (2006–2009)
- (New Zealand) William Armour (2010)
- (Australia) Billy Wright (2011)
- (Australia) Jamie Skelly (2012)
- (Australia) Dave Reid (2013–2014)
- (Scotland) William Rae (2014)
- (Australia) Craig Lewis (2015–2017)
- (England) Billy Buchanan (2017)
- (England) Willie Raynes (2017)
- (England) Andy O'Dell(2018)
- (Australia) Jamie Paterson (2018)
- (Australia) Lenny Greenanl (2018)
- (Australia) Jamie Skelly (2018)
- (Australia) Danny Verdun (2019)
- (England) Paul Williams (2020–2021)
- (Northern Ireland) Donn Delany (2022)
- (Australia) Scott Morrison (2023–2025)
