= List of Doncaster Rovers F.C. managers =

Below is a list of all Doncaster Rovers managers that have taken the reins since the appointment of Billy Calder in 1920. In the 41 years prior to Calder, the team was selected by club committee, a standard practice by football clubs at the time. After Brian Flynn was appointed Director of Football, Paul Dickov became the club's 40th full-time manager.

== Managers ==
Name	From	To	Notes
(Northern Ireland) Grant McCann	May 2023	present
(England) Danny Schofield	October 2022	May 2023
(England) Gary McSheffrey	December 2021	October 2022
(England) Richie Wellens	May 2021	December 2021
(England) Andy Butler	March 2021	May 2021
(Jamaica) Darren Moore	July 2019	March 2021
(Northern Ireland) Grant McCann	June 2018	June 2019
(Scotland) Darren Ferguson	Oct 2015	June 2018
(England) Rob Jones	Sept 2015	Oct 2015	Caretaker manager
(Scotland) Paul Dickov	May 2013	Sept 2015
(Wales) Brian Flynn	Jan 2013	May 2013
(Wales) Dean Saunders	Sept 2011	Jan 2013
(Republic of Ireland) Sean O'Driscoll	Sept 2006	Sept 2011
(England) Mickey Walker	Sept 2006		Caretaker manager
(England) Dave Penney	Jan 2002	Aug 2006
(England) Steve Wignall	May 2000	Jan 2002
(England) Dave Penney/ (England) Mark Atkins	Apr 2000	May 2000	Player/caretaker managers
(England) Ian Snodin	Aug 1998	Apr 2000	Player/manager
(England) Mark Weaver/ (Uruguay) Danny Bergara	Dec 1997	May 1998	Bergara was appointed Director of Football and worked alongside general manager Mark Weaver as the "management team"
(Uruguay) Danny Bergara	Nov 1997
(England) Dave Cowling	Oct 1997
(England) Colin Richardson	Sep 1997		Caretaker manager
(England) Kerry Dixon	Aug 1996	Aug 1997	Player/manager
(England) Sammy Chung	Jul 1994	Aug 1996
(England) Ian Atkins	Jan 1994	June 1994	Atkins made seven appearances during 1993–94 but was not a "player-manager"
(Jamaica) Tony Cunningham	Dec 1993	Jan 1994	Player/caretaker manager
(England) Steve Beaglehole	Nov 1991	Dec 1993
(Scotland) Billy Bremner	June 1989	Nov 1991
(Republic of Ireland) Joe Kinnear	Mar 1989	June 1989
(Scotland) Dave Mackay	Dec 1987	Mar 1989
(England) Dave Cusack	Oct 1985	Dec 1987	Player/manager
(Scotland) Billy Bremner	Nov 1979	Oct 1985	Bremner made 5 appearances for the club between 1980 and 1982
(England) Cyril Knowles	Nov 1979		Caretaker manager
(England) Stan Anderson	Feb 1975	Nov 1979
(Scotland) Johnny Quigley	Nov 1974	Feb 1975	Caretaker manager
(England) Maurice Setters	June 1971	Nov 1974
(England) Lawrie McMenemy	Nov 1968	May 1971
(England) Jackie Bestall	Nov 1968		Caretaker manager
(England) George Raynor	June 1967	Nov 1968
(England) Keith Kettleborough	Dec 1966	May 1967	Player/manager
(England) Jackie Bestall/ (England) Tom Garnett	May 1966	Dec 1966	Garnett (secretary) and Bestall were in charge of team affairs until December 1966
(England) Jackie Bestall/ (England) Frank Marshall	Feb 1966	May 1966	Joint caretaker managers after Leivers resignation
(England) Bill Leivers	Aug 1964	Feb 1966	Player/manager
(England) Oscar Hold	Apr 1962	Apr 1964
(England) Frank Marshall	Mar 1962	Apr 1962	Caretaker manager
(Scotland) Danny Malloy	Aug 1961	Mar 1962	Player/manager. Malloy's title was "player-coach", but he was in charge of team affairs
(England) Norman Curtis	Aug 1960	Jul 1961	Player/manager
(England) Jackie Bestall	Apr 1959	Aug 1960
(England) Jack Crayston	June 1958	Apr 1959
(England) Syd Bycroft/ (England) Jack Hodgson	Jan 1958	June 1958	Joint managers
(Northern Ireland) Peter Doherty	May 1949	Jan 1958	Doherty retired as a player after the 1952–3 season. From 1951 he simultaneously managed Northern Ireland.
(England) Jackie Bestall	Feb 1946	May 1949
(England) Billy Marsden	Apr 1944	Feb 1946	Part-time manager
(England) Fred Emery	Mar 1936	Jul 1940	Emery was appointed "manager" while still a player, but ceased playing after the 1935–36 season
(Scotland) David Menzies	June 1927	Feb 1936	Secretary-manager
(England) Dick Ray	June 1923	May 1927	Secretary-manager
(England) Arthur Porter	May 1922	Mar 1923	Secretary-manager
(England) Harry Tufnell	May 1921	Mar 1922	Secretary-manager
(Scotland) Billy Calder	June 1920	?	Honorary manager
