= Norman Moore =

Norman Moore may refer to:

- Sir Norman Moore, 1st Baronet (1847–1922), British doctor and biographer
- Norman Moore (rugby union) (1879 – 1939), English international rugby union player
- Norman Moore (footballer) (1919–2007), English footballer
- Norman W. Moore (1923–2015), conservationist, professor and baronet
- Norman Moore (politician) (born 1945), Australian politician
