= William Blanchard =

William Blanchard may refer to:

- William H. Blanchard (1916–1966), United States Air Force officer
- William Isaac Blanchard (died 1796), English stenographer
- William Blanchard (comedian) (1769–1835), English comedian
- William Blanchard (footballer) (1889–1963), English footballer

== See also ==
- William Blanchard Jerrold (1826–1884), English journalist and author
