= George Mountain =

George Mountain may refer to:

- George Mountain (bishop) (1789–1863), British-Canadian Anglican bishop
- George Montaigne (1569–1628), or Mountain, medieval archbishop of York
- George Mountain (footballer) (1874–1936), English footballer
- George Mountain (jockey) (1878–1948), American jockey
