= Andy O'Dell =

English footballer

Personal information
- Full name: Andrew O'Dell
- Date of birth: 2 January 1963 (age 63)
- Place of birth: Hull, England
- Position: Midfielder

Youth career
- Grimsby Town

Senior career*
Years	Team	Apps	(Gls)
1981–1983	Grimsby Town	20	(0)
1983–1985	Rotherham United	18	(0)
1985	Torquay United	14	(2)
–	Gainsborough Trinity		
–	North Ferriby United		
1987–198?	Darlington	3	(0)
1988	Heidelberg United		
1989–1990	Fawkner Blues		
1991	Morwell Falcons	15	(1)
1993	North Perth Croatia		
1993	Croydon City		
1996	Mitcham United		
- * Club domestic league appearances and goals

Andrew O'Dell (born 2 January 1963) is an English former footballer who played as a midfielder in the Football League for Grimsby Town – where he was Young Player of the Year in 1981 – Rotherham United, Torquay United and Darlington. He also played in non-league football for Gainsborough Trinity and North Ferriby United.

He then moved to Victoria, Australia, where he played for clubs including Heidelberg United, Fawkner, Morwell Falcons, North Perth Croatia, Croydon City and Mitcham United.

After his playing career ended, he remained in Australia and took up coaching. He was appointed senior coach of Victorian State League Division 1 club Preston Lions in 2014.

== Honours ==
Grimsby Town

- Football League Group Cup: 1981–82
