= Nigel Batch =

English footballer

Personal information
- Full name: Nigel Anthony Batch
- Date of birth: 9 November 1957 (age 69)
- Place of birth: Huddersfield, England
- Height: 5 ft 10 in (1.78 m)
- Position: Goalkeeper

Senior career*
Years	Team	Apps	(Gls)
1976–1987	Grimsby Town	348	(0)
1987–1988	Lincoln City	30	(0)
1988–1990	Darlington	38	(0)
1989	→ Stockport County (loan)	12	(0)
1991–1992	Scunthorpe United	1	(0)
Total		429	(0)
- * Club domestic league appearances and goals

Nigel Anthony Batch (born 9 November 1957) is an English former footballer who played in the Football League for Derby County, Darlington, Grimsby Town, Scunthorpe United and Stockport County. He was Lincoln City's goalkeeper as they won the 1987–88 Football Conference title, and a member of Darlington's squad as they won the same title in 1989–90.

Following his playing career Batch ran the Royal Oak in Holton-le-Clay, and has also worked as an interior designer, painter and decorator.

== Honours ==
Grimsby Town

- Football League Third Division: 1979–80
- Football League Group Cup: 1981–82
