= Kevin Moore (footballer, born 1958) =

English footballer (1958–2013)

Personal information
- Full name: Kevin Thomas Moore
- Date of birth: 29 April 1958
- Place of birth: Grimsby, England
- Date of death: 29 April 2013 (aged 55)
- Place of death: Hedge End, Hampshire, England
- Height: 5 ft 11 in (1.80 m)
- Position: Defender

Senior career*
Years	Team	Apps	(Gls)
1976–1987	Grimsby Town	400	(27)
1987	Oldham Athletic	13	(1)
1987–1994	Southampton	148	(10)
1992	→ Bristol Rovers (loan)	7	(0)
1992	→ Bristol Rovers (loan)	4	(1)
1994–1996	Fulham	51	(4)
Total		623	(43)
- * Club domestic league appearances and goals

Kevin Thomas Moore (29 April 1958 – 29 April 2013) was an English professional footballer.

Born in Grimsby, Lincolnshire, he played for Grimsby Town, Oldham Athletic, Southampton, Bristol Rovers and Fulham. Moore is one of five members of his family to play for Grimsby, including his brothers David and Andy, his father Roy and his uncle Norman.

== Illness and death ==
In January 2010, it was reported that Moore was suffering from Pick's disease, a rare form of dementia, and in need of 24-hour care. To support his care, his former club Southampton organised a charity golf day, while another of his former clubs, Grimsby, played a benefit match to provide for Moore's care. He died on his 55th birthday, 29 April 2013, in Hedge End, Hampshire.

== Career statistics ==
Appearances and goals by club, season and competition
Club	Season	League			FA Cup		League Cup		Other		Total	
Club	Season	Division	Apps	Goals	Apps	Goals	Apps	Goals	Apps	Goals	Apps	Goals
Grimsby Town
Grimsby Town	1976–77	Third Division	28	0	3	0	2	0	—		33	0
Grimsby Town	1977–78	Fourth Division	42	0	4	0	3	0	—		49	0
Grimsby Town	1978–79	Fourth Division	46	6	1	0	3	0	—		50	6
Grimsby Town	1979–80	Third Division	41	4	3	1	9	0	—		53	5
Grimsby Town	1980–81	Second Division	41	1	1	0	2	0	2 (Note: Appearances in Anglo-Scottish Cup)	0	46	1
Grimsby Town	1981–82	Second Division	36	4	3	1	2	1	6 (Note: Appearances in Football League Group Cup)	2	47	8
Grimsby Town	1982–83	Second Division	38	0	3	0	4	1	3	1	48	2
Grimsby Town	1983–84	Second Division	41	1	1	0	4	0	—		46	1
Grimsby Town	1984–85	Second Division	31	4	3	0	6	1	—		40	5
Grimsby Town	1985–86	Second Division	31	2	0	0	3	0	1 (Note: Appearances in Full Members' Cup)	0	35	2
Grimsby Town	1986–87	Second Division	25	5	3	1	3	0	1	0	32	6
Grimsby Town	Total		400	27	25	3	41	3	13	3	479	36
Oldham Athletic	1986–87	Second Division	13	1	0	0	0	0	2 (Note: Appearances in Second Division play-offs)	0	15	1
Southampton
Southampton	1987–88	First Division	35	3	2	0	2	0	1	0	40	3
Southampton	1988–89	First Division	25	3	2	0	6	1	2	0	35	4
Southampton	1989–90	First Division	21	1	2	0	3	0	—		26	1
Southampton	1990–91	First Division	19	1	4	0	3	0	1	0	27	1
Southampton	1991–92	First Division	16	0	2	0	2	0	1	1	21	1
Southampton	1992–93	Premier League	18	2	0	0	1	0	—		19	2
Southampton	1993–94	Premier League	14	0	1	0	2	1	—		17	1
Southampton	Total		148	10	13	0	19	2	5	1	185	13
Bristol Rovers (loan)
Bristol Rovers (loan)	1991–92	Second Division	7	0	0	0	0	0	—		7	0
Bristol Rovers (loan)	1992–93	First Division	4	1	0	0	0	0	—		4	1
Bristol Rovers (loan)	Total		11	1	0	0	0	0	0	0	11	1
Fulham
Fulham	1994–95	Third Division	31	3	4	0	4	2	2 (Note: Appearances in EFL Trophy)	0	41	5
Fulham	1995–96	Third Division	20	1	5	0	0	0	1	0	26	1
Fulham	Total		51	4	9	0	4	2	3	0	67	6
Career total			623	43	47	3	64	7	23	4	757	57

== Honours ==
Grimsby Town

- Football League Third Division: 1979–80
- Football League Group Cup: 1981–82

Southampton

- Full Members' Cup runner-up: 1991–92
