= Roy Moore (English footballer) =

English footballer (1923–1991)

Personal information
- Full name: Thomas Roy Moore
- Date of birth: 18 December 1923
- Place of birth: Grimsby, England
- Date of death: 1991 (aged 67–68)
- Place of death: Winchester, England
- Position: Central defender

Youth career
- –1948: Grimsby Town

Senior career*
Years	Team	Apps	(Gls)
1948–1950	Grimsby Town	3	(0)
–	Spalding United	?	(?)
- * Club domestic league appearances and goals

Thomas Roy Moore (18 December 1923 – December 1991) was an English professional footballer, who played as a central defender. Moore made 3 appearances in the Football League for Grimsby Town between 1948 and 1950, and also played non-league football for Spalding United.

== Personal life ==
Moore came from his footballing family; his three sons – Andy, David and Kevin – and his brother Norman all also played for Grimsby Town.
