= David Moore (footballer, born 1959) =

English footballer

Personal information
- Date of birth: 17 December 1959 (age 66)
- Place of birth: Grimsby, England
- Height: 6 ft 1 in (1.85 m)
- Position: Right back

Senior career*
Years	Team	Apps	(Gls)
1978–1983	Grimsby Town	136	(2)
1983–1984	Carlisle United	13	(1)
1984–1986	Blackpool	115	(1)
1986–1988	Grimsby Town	4	(0)
1988–1989	Darlington	30	(1)
1989–1990	Boston United		

Managerial career
- 1994–1996: Scunthorpe United
- 2011: Grimsby Town (caretaker)
- 2016: Grimsby Town (caretaker)
- * Club domestic league appearances and goals

David Moore (born 17 December 1959) is an English former professional footballer, football manager and physiotherapist.

As a player, he made nearly 300 appearances in the Football League between 1978 and 1990, playing as a defender for Grimsby Town, Carlisle United, Blackpool and Darlington. He also played non-league football for Boston United.

In 1994, he became manager of Scunthorpe United but was replaced two years later by Mick Buxton.

== Career ==
=== As a player ===
He played for his hometown club Grimsby Town, Carlisle United, Blackpool, Darlington and Boston United.

=== As a coach ===
Moore managed Scunthorpe United between 1994 and 1996, with a record of played 99, won 37, lost 36, drawn 26. He lost his job after a poor run of form in February and March 1996, and was replaced by Mick Buxton.

Moore re-joined Grimsby Town as the clubs physiotherapist. In February 2011, he took over as the club's caretaker manager following the sacking of Neil Woods and on 5 March 2011 Moore and Robbie Stockdale took charge of the club's 2–1 victory over AFC Wimbledon. Moore and Stockdale's reign lasted four games with victories against Wimbledon and Kettering Town, a draw with Gateshead and a defeat against Bath City. On 23 March 2011 Grimsby appointed Paul Hurst and Rob Scott as joint managers, and with there no need for an Assistant Manager at the club Moore reverted to his role as physiotherapist.

Moore took over again as caretaker manager in 2016 following the resignation of Paul Hurst and stayed in the position until the appointment of Marcus Bignot. In 2020 he was temporarily appointed as caretaker assistant manager to assist Ben Davies following Ian Holloway's departure.

Moore announced in December 2024 that he would retire at the end of the 2024–25 season.

== Sporting family ==
Moore is one of five members of his family to play for Grimsby, the other four being his brothers Kevin and Andy, his father Roy and his uncle Norman.

== Managerial statistics ==
As of 7 November 2016

Team	Nat	From	To	Record				
Team	Nat	From	To	G	W	D	L	Win %
Scunthorpe United	(England)	1 August 1994	31 July 1996	99	37	26	36	37.37
Grimsby Town	(England)	24 February 2011	23 March 2011	4	2	1	1	50.00
Grimsby Town	(England)	24 October 2016	7 November 2016	2	0	1	1	0.00
Total				105	39	28	38	37.14

== Honours ==
Grimsby Town

- Football League Third Division: 1979–80
- Football League Group Cup: 1981–82
