= Phil Crosby (footballer) =

English footballer

Personal information
- Full name: Philip Alan Crosby
- Date of birth: 9 November 1962 (age 64)
- Place of birth: Leeds, England
- Height: 5 ft 9 in (1.75 m)
- Position: Left back

Senior career*
Years	Team	Apps	(Gls)
1979–1983	Grimsby Town	39	(1)
1983–1989	Rotherham United	183	(2)
1989–1991	Peterborough United	87	(0)
1991–1992	York City	25	(0)
Total		334	(3)

International career
1981	England U20	4	(0)
- * Club domestic league appearances and goals

Philip Alan Crosby (born 9 November 1962) is an English former professional footballer who played as a left back.

== Career ==
Born in Leeds, Crosby played for Grimsby Town, Rotherham United, Peterborough United and York City.

Crosby also participated at the 1981 FIFA World Youth Championship, making four appearances in the tournament.

== Honours ==
Grimsby Town

- Football League Group Cup: 1981–82

Rotherham United

- Football League Fourth Division: 1988–89
