= Joe Waters (footballer) =

Irish footballer and coach

Personal information
- Date of birth: 20 September 1953 (age 73)
- Place of birth: Limerick, Republic of Ireland
- Positions: Midfielder; defender

Youth career
- 1969–1971: Leicester City

Senior career*
Years	Team	Apps	(Gls)
1971–1976	Leicester City	13	(1)
1976	→ Grimsby Town (loan)		
1976–1984	Grimsby Town	356	(65)
1984–1992	Tacoma Stars (indoor)	358	(45)
1988–1989	Calgary Kickers/Strikers	15	(0)

International career
1969	Ireland U-15	1	(0)
- Ireland U-18
1977–1979	Republic of Ireland	2	(1)

Managerial career
- 1990–1992: Tacoma Stars (assistant)
- 1998–2001: Pacific Lutheran University
- 2012–2015: Tacoma Stars
- * Club domestic league appearances and goals

Joseph Waters (born 20 September 1953) is an Irish former professional footballer who played in England and the United States. He lives in the United States where he coaches Tacoma Stars of PASL and youth soccer teams.

== Playing career ==
=== Club ===
Waters grew up in Limerick, Ireland where he was an outstanding athlete with the Limerick Athletic Club. He played gaelic football with the Old Christians GAA Club and hurling with CBS Sexton Street. He began his soccer career with Wembley Rovers, and briefly played for Pike Rovers before returning to Wembley. In April 1969, he joined Leicester City F.C.

In December 1973, he signed a professional contract with Leicester City, but had difficulty cracking the first team. However, he has a place in Foxes folklore for his two-goal debut in a FA Cup quarter final win against QPR at Loftus Road in 1974. In 1976, he went on loan to fourth division Grimsby Town, and had immediate success with the team, leading Grimsby Town to raise the possibility of a transfer. The price of £10,000 was too high for the team, so fans contributed £2,000.

Waters had an extensive career with Grimsby Town until 1984. He also scored five goals in twenty FA Cup games for the Mariners. In 1984, he moved to the United States and joined the Tacoma Stars of the Major Indoor Soccer League, bringing a change of position to defender and a rejuvenation of his career. In 1987 he led the Stars to the MISL finals for the first time in the team's history. He also played with the Calgary Kickers of the Canadian Soccer League in 1988 and 1989. He retired in 1992.

=== International ===
Waters played for the Republic of Ireland U15 and U-18 teams. On 13 October 1976, he made his international debut for the Republic of Ireland national football team in a friendly match against Turkey in Ankara. He scored the equaliser ten minutes from time in the 3–3 draw. His other full international cap came three years later when he replaced Gerry Daly as a second-half substitute in a 1–0 defeat to Northern Ireland on 21 November 1979 in Belfast.

== Coaching career ==
During his last few seasons with the Tacoma Stars, Waters served as an assistant coach. In 1992, he became the head coach of the Bellarmine Preparatory School boys' soccer team, and took the team to the 2004 and 2008 state championships.

In 1994, Gig Harbor High School hired him to coach their girls' soccer team. In 1998 he was hired as head coach of the Pacific Lutheran University men's soccer team and compiled a 25-39-6 record during his four years there.

In 2003, he became the Bellarmine Prep School girls' soccer coach, in addition to his duties with the boys' team, taking the girls to the 2004 state championship. On 12 September 2012, Waters was hired as head coach of the Tacoma Stars of the Professional Arena Soccer League.

== Honours ==
Grimsby Town

- Football League Third Division: 1979–80
- Football League Group Cup: 1981–82
