= Jimmy Greenhalgh =

English football player, coach and manager (1923–2013)

Personal information
- Full name: James Radcliffe Greenhalgh
- Date of birth: 25 August 1923
- Place of birth: Manchester, England
- Date of death: 31 August 2013 (aged 90)
- Place of death: Darlington, England
- Position: Wing half

Senior career*
Years	Team	Apps	(Gls)
- Newton Heath Loco
1946–1950	Hull City	148	(5)
1950–1955	Bury	122	(1)
1955–1956	Wigan Athletic		
1956–1959	Gillingham	16	(1)

Managerial career
- 1966–1968: Darlington
- * Club domestic league appearances and goals

James Radcliffe Greenhalgh (25 August 1923 – 31 August 2013) was an English football player and manager. He played as a wing half and made nearly 300 appearances in the Football League for Hull City, Bury and Gillingham. As a manager, he took charge of Darlington from 1966 to 1968 and had a lengthy career in coaching and scouting.

== Life and career ==
James Radcliffe Greenhalgh was born on 25 August 1923 in Manchester, where he grew up in the Moston district and worked as a butcher's assistant. He played football for Newton Heath Loco before signing for Third Division North club Hull City ahead of the first postwar Football League season. He was reported to have chosen Hull because wartime bomb damage meant there was no housing available for him and his wife local to rival suitors Wigan Athletic and Everton. He went straight into the League side, occupying four different positions in the first five matches, before settling at right half and missing only one match all season. He was used less in 1947–48, but re-established himself in the side the following season, missing only one match as Hull won the Third Division North title and reached the quarter-final of the FA Cup, in which they lost 1–0 to Manchester United. He began as a regular in the Second Division, but gradually dropped out of contention, and in November 1950, he joined another second-tier club, Bury, for a £13,000 fee.

He was ever-present for his first two years with Bury, and then missed a few weeks with injury, but at the start of the 1953–54 season, found his place under threat from Don May and Tommy Daniel and was transfer-listed at his request. He did not leave, and came back into the side halfway through the season, but appeared only once in 1954–55. Interest from Liverpool came to nothing, despite the nominal fee asked, and Greenhalgh left both Bury and the Football League in 1955 to spend a season with Wigan Athletic of the Lancashire Combination. In July 1956, Greenhalgh joined Third Division South club Gillingham as player-coach, and continued in post for two and a half years. However, after his first season, he played only reserve-team football.

Greenhalgh was appointed trainer-coach of Second Division club Lincoln City in January 1959, and took up the same role with Newcastle United in June 1962. Under manager Joe Harvey, Greenhalgh contributed to the team's Second Division title in 1965 and their first season back in the top flight before becoming manager of Darlington in July 1966, after Lol Morgan, who had quit after leading the team to their first promotion for forty years. Greenhalgh failed to keep the team in the Third Division, and controversially released appearance record-holder Ron Greener on a free transfer – the men became friends in later life, and according to Greener, interviewed in 2000, "He was an awful bloody manager, made a right mess of it and now he'll admit as much". At the end of February 1968, with the team bottom of the Fourth Division, Greenhalgh left "by mutual agreement".

It would be his only managerial appointment. His daughter said later that "he loved playing and someone once wrote that he developed into a well-respected coach during the later stages of his football career", but that "being a manager was sat behind a desk in those days." Within days, he was offered and accepted the post of chief coach at Middlesbrough. He remained on the club's staff until 1979. He joined Sunderland as chief scout on 1 January 1980. In 1990, he was attached to the coaching staff of the Dutch Football Association, and later that year he was used by Port Vale manager John Rudge as a scout in the north-east of England.

Greenhalgh was married to Flo; they had two children, Linda and James. Towards the end of his life he was a resident of a care home in Darlington, where he died on 31 August 2013 at the age of 90.

== Career statistics ==
=== Playing ===
Appearances and goals by club, season and competition
Club	Season	League			FA Cup		Total	
Club	Season	Division	Apps	Goals	Apps	Goals	Apps	Goals
Hull City	1946–47	Third Division North	41	1	5	0	46	1
Hull City	1947–48	Third Division North	27	0	4	0	31	0
Hull City	1948–49	Third Division North	41	3	7	1	48	4
Hull City	1949–50	Second Division	32	1	3	1	35	2
Hull City	1950–51	Second Division	7	0	—		7	0
Hull City	Total		148	5	19	2	167	7
Bury	1950–51	Second Division	24	1	1	0	25	1
Bury	1951–52	Second Division	42	0	1	0	43	0
Bury	1952–53	Second Division	34	0	0	0	34	0
Bury	1953–54	Second Division	21	0	1	0	22	0
Bury	1954–55	Second Division	1	0	0	0	1	0
Bury	Total		122	1	3	0	125	1
Wigan Athletic	1955–56	Lancashire Combination						
Gillingham	1956–57	Third Division South	16	1	1	0	17	1
Career total			286	7	23	2	309	9

=== Managerial ===
Managerial record by team and tenure
Team	From	To	Record				
Team	From	To	P	W	D	L	Win %
Darlington	July 1966	28 February 1968	90	25	26	39	27.8

== Sources ==
- Tweddle, Frank (2000). The Definitive Darlington F.C. Nottingham: Soccerdata. ISBN 978-1-899468-15-7.
