= Norman Penrose =

English footballer

Personal information
- Full name: Norman Penrose
- Date of birth: 10 March 1922
- Place of birth: Consett, England
- Date of death: 2000 (aged 77–78)
- Position: Wing half

Youth career
- 1937–1938: Medomsley Juniors

Senior career*
Years	Team	Apps	(Gls)
1938–1949	Grimsby Town	9	(0)
- * Club domestic league appearances and goals

Norman Penrose (10 March 1922 – 2000) was an English professional footballer who played as a wing half.
