= Edward Brumley =

English footballer (1878–1942)

Personal information
- Date of birth: 7 May 1878
- Place of birth: Grimsby, England
- Date of death: 3 February 1942 (aged 63)
- Position: Centre-half

Senior career*
Years	Team	Apps	(Gls)
1898–1899	Humber Rovers		
1899–1901	Grimsby All Saints		
1901–1903	Grimsby Town	5	(2)
1903	Hull Comets		
1903	West Marsh		
1903–190?	Reading		
- * Club domestic league appearances and goals

Edward Brumley (7 May 1878 – 3 February 1942) was an English footballer who played as a centre-half.
