= Jimmy McStay (footballer, born 1922) =

Northern Ireland footballer

Personal information
- Full name: James Gerald McStay
- Date of birth: 4 August 1922
- Place of birth: Newry, Northern Ireland
- Date of death: 17 January 2007 (aged 84)
- Place of death: North Yorkshire, England
- Position: Winger

Senior career*
Years	Team	Apps	(Gls)
1947–1948	Dundalk	24	(11)
1948–1951	Grimsby Town	73	(20)
1951–1952	Hastings United	32	(8)
1952–1956	Boston United	67	(10)

International career
	Republic of Ireland	1	(0)
- * Club domestic league appearances and goals

James Gerald McStay (4 August 1922 – 2007) was a professional footballer who played as a winger.
