= Mike Rowbotham =

South African footballer

Personal information
- Full name: Michael Grant Rowbotham
- Date of birth: 2 September 1965 (age 61)
- Place of birth: Sheffield, England
- Position: Midfielder

Senior career*
Years	Team	Apps	(Gls)
1983–1984	Manchester United	0	(0)
1985–1986	Grimsby Town	4	(0)
1986–1993	Wits University		

International career
1992	South Africa	2	(0)
- * Club domestic league appearances and goals

Michael Grant Rowbotham (born 2 September 1965) is a former South African footballer, who played as a midfielder for Manchester United, Grimsby Town and Wits University.
