= Ian Walton =

English footballer

Personal information
- Full name: Ian Jeffrey Walton
- Date of birth: 17 April 1958 (age 68)
- Place of birth: Goole, England
- Position: Midfielder

Senior career*
Years	Team	Apps	(Gls)
1975–1976	Grimsby Town	2	(1)
1976–1977	Scunthorpe United	1	(0)
1977–19??	Goole Town		
- * Club domestic league appearances and goals

Ian Jeffrey Walton (born 17 April 1958) is an English former professional footballer who played as a midfielder.
