= Jimmy Dyson =

English footballer

Personal information
- Full name: James Middleton Dyson
- Date of birth: 4 March 1907
- Place of birth: Middleton, Lancashire, England
- Date of death: 2000 (aged 92–93)
- Height: 5 ft 7 in (1.70 m)
- Position: Winger

Senior career*
Years	Team	Apps	(Gls)
1924–1925	Park Villa		
1925–1926	British Dyestuffs		
1926–1927	Northwich Victoria		
1927–1932	Oldham Athletic	122	(40)
1932–1938	Grimsby Town	139	(37)
1938–1939	Nottingham Forest	15	(0)
1939	Accrington Stanley	0	(0)
- * Club domestic league appearances and goals

James Middleton Dyson (4 March 1907 – 2000) was an English professional footballer who played as a winger.
