= Tom Blythe =

English footballer

Personal information
- Full name: Thomas Henry Blythe
- Date of birth: 16 September 1871
- Place of birth: Shoreham, England
- Date of death: 1944 (aged 72–73)
- Position: Inside forward

Senior career*
Years	Team	Apps	(Gls)
1895–1898	Grimsby All Saints		
1898	Grimsby Town	3	(1)
1898	Cleethorpes Swifts		
1898	Grimsby Town	1	(0)
1899–1???	Grimsby All Saints		
- * Club domestic league appearances and goals

Thomas Henry Blythe (16 September 1871 – 1944) was an English professional footballer who played as an inside forward.
