= Ken Harrison (footballer) =

English footballer

Personal information
- Full name: Kenneth Harrison
- Date of birth: 20 January 1926
- Place of birth: Stockton-on-Tees, England
- Date of death: November 2010 (aged 84)
- Place of death: Hull, England
- Position: Right winger

Senior career*
Years	Team	Apps	(Gls)
- Billingham Synthonia
1947–1955	Hull City	238	(47)
1955–1956	Derby County	15	(3)
- Goole Town
Total		253	(50)
- * Club domestic league appearances and goals

Kenneth Harrison (20 January 1926 – November 2010) was an English professional footballer who played as a right winger.

== Career ==
Born in Stockton-on-Tees, Harrison played for Billingham Synthonia, Hull City, Derby County and Goole Town.

In March 1947, he joined Hull City where he was an ever-present in Raich Carter's team that won the Third Division North in 1948–49. He scored 51 goals for the club from 263 appearances.

He died in Hull in November 2010.
