= Andy Moore (footballer) =

English footballer

Personal information
- Full name: Andrew Roy Moore
- Date of birth: 14 November 1965 (age 60)
- Place of birth: Cleethorpes, England
- Height: 6 ft 0 in (1.83 m)
- Position: Central defender

Youth career
- –1983: Grimsby Town

Senior career*
Years	Team	Apps	(Gls)
1983–1987	Grimsby Town	65	(1)
1987–1988	Lincoln City	28	(1)
1988–1989	Shamrock Rovers	25	(2)
- * Club domestic league appearances and goals

Andrew Roy Moore (born 14 November 1965) is an English former professional footballer who played as a central defender. Moore made 65 appearances in the Football League for Grimsby Town between 1983 and 1987, and also played Conference football for Lincoln City.

== Career ==
=== Shamrock Rovers ===
Moore signed for Shamrock Rovers in August 1988 and made his League of Ireland debut on the opening day of the 1988–89 season in a 1–0 loss to Athlone Town at Dalymount Park.

He scored his first goal on 16 October in a 3–2 home win over Limerick.

In a home game against Cork City on 11 November, Moore scored with a header for Rovers to lead 2–1 but then in injury time he caught the ball from a corner thinking the referee had blown the full-time whistle. Cork duly scored from the resultant penalty.

He was sent off as Rovers lost at Limerick in December 1988.

He made two appearances in the FAI Cup as well as 25 in the League.

== Personal life ==
Moore came from a footballing family; his two brothers David and Kevin, his father Roy and his uncle Norman all also played for Grimsby Town.
