= Bert Brocklesbury =

English footballer

Personal information
- Full name: Herbert Ernest Brocklesbury
- Date of birth: 27 June 1879
- Place of birth: Grimsby, England
- Date of death: 9 March 1959 (aged 79)
- Position: Full-back

Senior career*
Years	Team	Apps	(Gls)
1895–1896	Grimsby White Star		
1896–1898	St James United		
1898	Grimsby Town	3	(0)
1898–1???	Grimsby All Saints		
- * Club domestic league appearances and goals

Herbert Ernest Brocklesbury (27 June 1879 – 9 March 1959) was an English professional footballer who played as a full-back.
