= Stewart Gray (footballer) =

English footballer (born 1950)

Personal information
- Full name: Stewart Alexander Gray
- Date of birth: 16 October 1950
- Place of birth: Doncaster, England
- Position: Defender

Senior career*
Years	Team	Apps	(Gls)
1968–1970	Doncaster Rovers	57	(0)
1970–1978	Grimsby Town	264	(2)
1978	Doncaster Rovers	6	(0)
1978–19??	Frickley Athletic		
- * Club domestic league appearances and goals

Stewart Alexander Gray (born 16 October 1950) was an English professional footballer who played as a defender.
