= Viggo Jensen (footballer, born 1921) =

Danish footballer (1921–2005)

Personal information
- Full name: Hans Viggo Jensen
- Date of birth: 9 March 1921
- Place of birth: Skagen, Denmark
- Date of death: 30 November 2005 (aged 84)
- Place of death: Esbjerg, Denmark
- Position: Midfielder

Senior career*
| Years | Team | Apps | (Gls) |
| 1939–1948 | Esbjerg fB | 101 | (25) |
| 1948–1956 | Hull City | 308 | (51) |

International career
| 1945–1948 | Denmark | 15 | (1) |
Medal record
Men's football
Representing Denmark
Olympics
| Bronze medal – third place | 1948 London | Team |
- * Club domestic league appearances and goals

Hans Viggo Jensen (29 March 1921 – 30 November 2005), known simply as Viggo Jensen, was a Danish footballer who played as a midfielder for Esbjerg fB and Hull City.

He represented Denmark internationally, scoring one goal in 15 games. He was also a member of the squad who won bronze at the 1948 Summer Olympics.

== Biography ==
Jensen was born in Skagen, but made his senior level break-through with Danish club Esbjerg fB in the amateur-only Danish football. He made his debut for Esbjerg in September 1939, and played at least 195 official games for the club until 1948, including 68 games in the Danish top-flight championship from 1941 to 1945. Viggo Jensen was a physically strong player with a great fitness and tackling ability, as well as flair and technique.

Jensen got his international debut in June 1945, and was a part of the amateur-only Danish national team until October 1948. He was one of only a few players from outside the Copenhagen area able to force his way into the national team, and was most often the only provincial player in the starting line-up. Jensen's versatility saw him deployed in a number of positions for the national team, as injury or bad form among his teammates dictated, though usually as a wing half back. According to then-captain of the national team, Knud Lundberg, Jensen's best position was as central half back, a position he was only allowed to play once for Denmark; leading the team to an 8-0 win against the Poland national football team. Following the game, Jensen was criticized by the Danish Football Association for successfully dribbling and passing the ball to his teammates instead of doing as he had been instructed; to hoof the ball away whenever he came under pressure. Even though Esbjerg were demoted to the Danish 2nd Division in 1945, Jensen kept his place in the national team squad, and was the only player from a non-Copenhagen team selected to represent his country at the 1948 Summer Olympics in London. Here he filled in for injured Poul Petersen as right full back, and played all four games as Denmark won bronze medals.

After the London Olympics, Jensen moved to play for English 2nd Division team Hull City from October 1948 to November 1956, appearing in 308 Football League matches and scoring 51 goals. Jensen played the two first years as an amateur, before signing a professional contract with the club. His early appearances were at inside-right, but he demonstrated great versatility, playing in every outfield position except on the wings. His later appearances were mainly as a left-back.

In December 1956, he returned to Denmark to coach Esbjerg fB, and he later coached lower-league team Varde Boldklub. Upon his return to Denmark, he worked 23 years at the Esbjerg public power plant.
