= Teddy Buck =

English footballer

Personal information
- Full name: Edward Buck
- Date of birth: 29 October 1904
- Place of birth: Dipton, County Durham, England
- Date of death: 1993 (aged 88–89)
- Height: 5 ft 10 in (1.78 m)
- Position: Wing half

Senior career*
Years	Team	Apps	(Gls)
1926–1928	West Stanley		
1928–1929	Leeds United	8	(0)
1929–1945	Grimsby Town	354	(4)
- * Club domestic league appearances and goals

Edward Buck (29 October 1904 – 1993) was an English professional footballer who played as a wing half.
