= Fred Bisby =

English footballer

Personal information
- Date of birth: 1880
- Place of birth: Ecclesfield, England
- Date of death: 17 September 1948
- Position: Winger

Senior career*
Years	Team	Apps	(Gls)
1902–1903	Kilnhurst Town		
1903–1904	Rawmarsh		
1904–1905	Kilnhurst Town		
1905–1907	Grimsby Town	12	(1)
1908	Cleethorpes Town		
1908	Worksop Town		
1908	Grimsby Rangers		
1908–19??	Denaby United		
- * Club domestic league appearances and goals

Fred Bisby (1880 – 17 September 1948) was an English professional footballer who played as a winger.
