= Jack Lewis (footballer, born 1948) =

English footballer

Personal information
- Full name: Frederick John Lewis
- Date of birth: 22 March 1948 (age 78)
- Place of birth: Long Eaton, Derbyshire, England
- Height: 5 ft 9 in (1.75 m)
- Position: Forward

Senior career*
| Years | Team | Apps | (Gls) |
| – | Long Eaton United | | |
| 1967–1970 | Lincoln City | 62 | (9) |
| 1970–1977 | Grimsby Town | 258 | (74) |
| 1977–1978 | Blackburn Rovers | 28 | (6) |
| 1978–1980 | Doncaster Rovers | 64 | (10) |
| 1980–1981 | Scarborough | 13 | (5) |

International career
| 1976 | Wales U23 | 1 | (0) |
- * Club domestic league appearances and goals

Frederick John "Jack" Lewis (born 22 March 1948) is a former footballer who scored 99 goals from 412 appearances in the Football League playing for Lincoln City, Grimsby Town, Blackburn Rovers and Doncaster Rovers. He also played non-league football for Long Eaton United and Scarborough.

Lewis was selected in the Wales squad for their UEFA Euro 1976 qualifying match against Austria in November 1975, but did not play. He appeared as an over-age player for the Wales under-23 team in a 3–2 defeat to Scotland under-23s in February 1976.
