= Jackie Scott =

Northern Irish footballer and manager

Personal information
- Full name: John Scott
- Date of birth: 22 December 1933
- Place of birth: Belfast, Northern Ireland
- Date of death: June 1978 (aged 44)
- Place of death: Manchester, England
- Position: Outside forward

Youth career
- Boyland Youth Club
- Ormond Star
- 1950–1952: Manchester United

Senior career*
| Years | Team | Apps | (Gls) |
| 1952–1956 | Manchester United | 3 | (0) |
| 1956–1963 | Grimsby Town | 241 | (51) |
| 1963–1964 | York City | 21 | (3) |
| 1964–1966 | Margate | 95 | (26) |
| Total | | 360 | (80) |

International career
| 1957 | Northern Ireland B | 1 | (1) |
| 1958 | Northern Ireland | 2 | (0) |
- * Club domestic league appearances and goals

John "Jackie" Scott (22 December 1933 – June 1978), also known as Jack Scott or Johnny Scott, was a former Northern Ireland international footballer and football manager who played as an outside forward for Manchester United, Grimsby Town and York City in the 1950s and 1960s.

== Club career ==
Born in Belfast, Scott played football for Boyland Youth Club and Ormond Star in Northern Ireland, before moving to England as an apprentice with Manchester United. He signed his first professional contract with United in October 1951, and made his debut a year later, playing on the left wing in a 6–2 defeat to Wolverhampton Wanderers on 4 October 1952. However, due to the competition for places in the Manchester United first team, Scott's appearances were few and far between, having made just three appearances when he left for Grimsby Town in June 1956.

Scott flourished at Grimsby, his performances catching the attention of the Northern Irish selectors, who called him up for a B international in 1957, before naming him in the squad for the 1958 World Cup. However, that was to be the end of his involvement with the Northern Irish national team as he was not selected again.

Scott played for Grimsby for a total of seven seasons, making 250 appearances in all competitions and scoring 54 goals. In 1963, he was allowed to leave the club on a free transfer to York City. He played for York for one season before dropping out of the Football League to play for Margate in the Southern League. In two seasons at Margate, he played in 95 matches and scored 26 goals, before retiring to Manchester.

== International career ==
Scott played in two matches at the 1958 FIFA World Cup; a 2–1 victory over Czechoslovakia and a 4–0 defeat to France in the quarter-finals.

== Later life ==
Scott was killed in a building site accident in 1978, aged 44.

== Career statistics ==
=== International ===
| National team | Year | Apps | Goals |
|---|---|---|---|
| Northern Ireland | 1958 | 2 | 0 |
| Total | | 2 | 0 |

== Honours ==
Grimsby Town

- Third Division second-place promotion: 1961–62
