= George Mountain (footballer) =

English footballer (1874–1936)

Personal information
- Date of birth: 4 July 1874
- Place of birth: Grimsby, England
- Date of death: 10 July 1936 (aged 62)
- Position: Full-back

Senior career*
Years	Team	Apps	(Gls)
1889–1894	Grimsby White Star		
1894–1895	Waltham Hornets		
1895	Grimsby Town	1	(0)
1895–1897	Grimsby All Saints		
1897–1903	Grimsby Town	151	(4)
1903–1904	Leicester Fosse	26	(0)
1904–190?	Grimsby Rangers		
- * Club domestic league appearances and goals

George Mountain (4 July 1874 – 10 July 1936) was an English professional footballer who played as a full-back.
