= Shaun Cunnington =

English footballer

Personal information
- Full name: Shaun Cunnington
- Date of birth: 4 January 1966 (age 60)
- Place of birth: Bourne, Lincolnshire, England
- Height: 5 ft 8 in (1.73 m)
- Position: Midfielder

Senior career*
| Years | Team | Apps | (Gls) |
| 1984–1988 | Wrexham | 198 | (12) |
| 1988–1992 | Grimsby Town | 182 | (13) |
| 1992–1995 | Sunderland | 58 | (8) |
| 1995–1997 | West Bromwich Albion | 13 | (0) |
| 1997–1998 | Notts County | 17 | (0) |
| 1998–2000 | Kidderminster Harriers | 35 | (2) |
| Total | | 506 | (35) |

Managerial career
- 2004: Kidderminster Harriers (Caretaker)
- 2007–2008: Alvechurch
- 2008–2009: Willenhall Town
- 2011–2012: Halesowen Town
- 2013–2014: Evesham United
- * Club domestic league appearances and goals

Shaun Cunnington (born 4 January 1966) is an English former professional footballer and former manager of Evesham United.

== Career ==
Having started playing with Bourne Town, most of his playing career was spent in the second tier of English football with Wrexham, Grimsby Town, Sunderland and West Bromwich Albion.

He started his career as a trainee with Wrexham before moving to Grimsby Town in 1988 for a fee of £65,000. He then moved to Sunderland in 1992 for a fee of £650,000. He spent three years with West Bromwich Albion before moving on to Notts County.

In 1998, he joined part-timers Kidderminster Harriers. After a spate of injuries, he eventually retired to become a coach, and in 2003 became Harriers' Youth Team coach.

In October 2004 he became caretaker manager of Kidderminster Harriers Football Club, after Jan Molby resigned following a poor run of form. Under Cunnington Harriers lost all seven games played under his stewardship. He returned to be Youth Team coach when Stuart Watkiss became Harriers' new manager, but left the club in July 2005 to spend more time running his Italian restaurant in Droitwich Spa, where he lives.

In May 2008 he became manager of Willenhall Town, replacing Dean Edwards.

He was manager of Halesowen Town replacing Tony Thorpe in January 2011, bringing long-time friend Paul Tomlinson to the club as Assistant Manager. In September 2012, Cunnington resigned from his post as manager at the club.

On 17 May 2013 Cunnington was confirmed as the new manager of Evesham United
