= William Blanchard (footballer) =

English footballer

Personal information
- Full name: John William Blanchard
- Date of birth: 9 February 1889
- Place of birth: Grimsby, England
- Date of death: 1963 (aged 73–74)
- Height: 6 ft 0 in (1.83 m)
- Position: Full-back

Senior career*
Years	Team	Apps	(Gls)
1907–1910	Grimsby Town	4	(0)
1910	Grimsby Rangers		
1910–1913	Grimsby Town	3	(0)
1913	Fulham		
1913–1915	Grimsby Town	4	(0)
- * Club domestic league appearances and goals

John William Blanchard (9 February 1889 – 1963) was an English footballer who played as a full-back.
