= Ron Rafferty =

English footballer (1934–2021)

Personal information
- Date of birth: 6 May 1934
- Place of birth: Newcastle upon Tyne, England
- Date of death: 24 January 2021 (aged 86)
- Position: Forward

Senior career*
Years	Team	Apps	(Gls)
1954	Wycombe Wanderers	?	(6)
1954–1956	Portsmouth	23	(5)
1957–1963	Grimsby Town	264	(145)
1963–1965	Hull City	16	(6)
1966–1969	Aldershot	81	(10)
- Guildford City
Total		384	(172)
- * Club domestic league appearances and goals

Ron Rafferty (6 May 1934 – 24 January 2021) was an English footballer who played in the Football League for Portsmouth, Grimsby Town, Hull City and Aldershot.

Rafferty died on 24 January 2021, at the age of 86.
