= Alan Barnett (footballer) =

English footballer

Personal information
- Full name: Alan George Samuel Barnett
- Date of birth: 4 November 1934
- Place of birth: Croydon, England
- Date of death: October 1978 (aged 43)
- Place of death: Portsmouth, England
- Height: 6 ft 0 in (1.83 m)
- Position: Goalkeeper

Youth career
- Croydon Amateurs

Senior career*
Years	Team	Apps	(Gls)
1955–58	Portsmouth	25	(0)
1958–63	Grimsby Town	116	(0)
1963–66	Exeter City	57	(0)
1966	Torquay United	0	(0)
- * Club domestic league appearances and goals

Alan George Samuel Barnett (4 November 1934 – October 1978) was an English professional football goalkeeper.

Alan Barnett began his career with local side Croydon Amateurs, from whom he joined Portsmouth in September 1955. He made 25 league appearances before moving to Grimsby Town in December 1958.

He played more regularly at Grimsby, making 116 league appearances before a move to Exeter City in July 1963. In his three seasons at Exeter he played 57 league games. His final move to a league club came in June 1966, but unable to dislodge first Gary McGuire and then John Dunn, left Plainmoor without making a first team appearance.
