= Norman Moore (footballer) =

English footballer

Personal information
- Full name: Norman Woodliffe Moore
- Date of birth: 15 October 1919
- Place of birth: Grimsby, England
- Date of death: 14 March 2007 (aged 87)
- Place of death: Grimsby, England
- Position: Centre forward

Youth career
- 1939–1946: Grimsby Town

Senior career*
Years	Team	Apps	(Gls)
1946–1947	Grimsby Town	7	(1)
1947–1950	Hull City	81	(46)
1950–1951	Blackburn Rovers	7	(1)
1951–1952	Bury	2	(0)
- Goole Town
Total		97	(48)
- * Club domestic league appearances and goals

Norman Woodliffe Moore (15 October 1919 – 14 March 2007) was an English professional footballer who played as a centre forward. He played in the Football League for four clubs between 1946 and 1952, scoring 48 goals in 97 league appearances.

== Career ==
Born in Grimsby, Moore played for Grimsby Town, Hull City, Blackburn Rovers, Bury and Goole Town.

== Personal life ==
Moore was from a footballing family; his brother Roy and his three nephews (Andy, David and Kevin) all also played for Grimsby Town.
