= Harry Wainman =

English footballer

Personal information
- Full name: William Henry Wainman
- Date of birth: 22 March 1947 (age 79)
- Place of birth: Hull, England
- Position: Goalkeeper

Youth career
- Grimsby Town

Senior career*
Years	Team	Apps	(Gls)
1963–1977	Grimsby Town	420	(0)
1972–1973	→ Rochdale (loan)	9	(0)
Total		432	(0)
- * Club domestic league appearances and goals

William Henry Wainman (born 22 March 1947) is an English former professional footballer who played as a goalkeeper from 1963 to 1977. He played 420 times for Grimsby Town and also spent 9 games on loan at Rochdale between 1972 and 1973.

Wainman retired in 1977 through injury, and went on to run a sports shop in Grimsby and later a hotel called the Ivys in Cleethorpes

== Honours ==
=== Grimsby Town ===
- Supporters Player of the Season: 1972, 1976
- England Youth International
