= George McLean (footballer, born 1937) =

Scottish footballer

Personal information
- Date of birth: 16 September 1937 (age 89)
- Place of birth: Paisley, Scotland
- Position: Centre forward

Youth career
- Cambuslang Rangers

Senior career*
Years	Team	Apps	(Gls)
1959–1961	Rangers	8	(5)
1961–1962	Norwich City	0	(0)
1962–1965	Grimsby Town	91	(41)
1965–1967	Exeter City	47	(12)
1967–1968	Workington	53	(16)
1968–1969	Barrow	27	(9)
	Boston United	69	(34)
Total		226	(83)
- * Club domestic league appearances and goals

George McLean (born 16 September 1937) is a Scottish former footballer.
