= Jackie Bestall =

English footballer and manager (1900–1985)

Personal information
- Full name: John Gilbert Bestall
- Date of birth: 24 June 1900
- Place of birth: Beighton, Sheffield, England
- Date of death: 11 April 1985 (aged 84)
- Place of death: Doncaster, England
- Height: 5 ft 2 1/2 in (1.59 m)
- Position: Inside forward

Youth career
- Beighton Miners Welfare

Senior career*
Years	Team	Apps	(Gls)
1925	Rotherham County	2	(0)
1925–1926	Rotherham United	59	(16)
1926–1938	Grimsby Town	427	(76)

International career
1935	England	1	(0)

Managerial career
- 1946–1949: Doncaster Rovers
- 1949–1953: Blackburn Rovers
- 1953–1954: Nelson
- 1959–1960: Doncaster Rovers
- * Club domestic league appearances and goals

John Gilbert Bestall (24 June 1900 – 11 April 1985) was an English international footballer, he also played top-division football and captained Grimsby Town, and later managed Doncaster Rovers and Blackburn Rovers.

== Rotherham County and Rotherham United ==
Bestall made his debut for Rotherham County towards the end of the 1924–25 season, playing the last two games. County finished bottom of Division Three (North) that season and merged with Rotherham Town to form the new club, Rotherham United, that took the place of County in Division Three (North) for 1925–26.

Jackie was an ever-present in the 1925–26 season and in scoring 12 goals he was instrumental in producing much better fortunes. He playing in the first 17 games of the 1926–27 season before being sold shortly before an FA Cup tie at Lincoln City to Grimsby Town due to financial difficulties.

== Grimsby Town ==
Bestall is regarded as "perhaps the greatest name on Town's roll-call – a diminutive craftsman full of guile and possessed of outstanding constructive qualities". He had a lounge at Blundell Park and the smallest road in Grimsby and Cleethorpes named after him.

Bestall captained Grimsby to the 1933–34 Second Division title and back into the First Division after two seasons in the Second. This helped Bestall to earn his only England cap aged 34 years, 226 days against Northern Ireland on 6 February 1935. He is the sixth oldest player to make his England debut and was the first Grimsby player to be capped by England.

He played in Grimsby's first FA Cup semi-final against Arsenal, but was injured early in the game, which Arsenal won 1–0. Grimsby Town fans believed that Bestall was targeted by the Arsenal defenders in the hope of deliberately injuring him.

Bestall played 427 league games for Town, only ever beaten by Keith Jobling and latterly John McDermott.

== After retirement ==
When Bestall retired he had numerous jobs in football, coaching at Birmingham City and chief scout, chief scout at Doncaster Rovers, managing Blackburn Rovers and two spells as manager of Doncaster.

In tribute to his career at Grimsby Town, the town named a street after him.

== Honours ==
=== Grimsby Town ===
- Second Division Champions: 1934

All-Time Club Performance
Club	Division	Years	League		Cup		Total
Club	Division	Years	App	Goals	App	Goals	App	Goals
Rotherham County	Third Division (North)	1924–25	2	0	0	0	2	0
Rotherham United	Third Division (North)	1925–26	42	12	3	0	45	12
Rotherham United	Third Division (North)	1926–27	17	4	0	0	17	4
Club Totals			61	16	3	0	64	16
Grimsby Town	Second Division	1926–27	23	7	2	1	25	8
Grimsby Town	Second Division	1927–28	41	10	1	0	42	10
Grimsby Town	Second Division	1928–29	39	11	2	0	41	11
Grimsby Town	First Division	1929–30	39	10	2	0	41	10
Grimsby Town	First Division	1930–31	42	10	3	2	45	12
Grimsby Town	First Division	1931–32	37	2	3	2	40	4
Grimsby Town	Second Division	1932–33	40	5	2	0	42	5
Grimsby Town	Second Division	1933–34	42	11	2	0	44	11
Grimsby Town	First Division	1934–35	41	5	1	0	42	5
Grimsby Town	First Division	1935–36	41	2	6	2	47	4
Grimsby Town	First Division	1936–37	31	3	4	0	35	3
Grimsby Town	First Division	1937–38	11	0	2	0	13	0
Club Totals			427	76	30	7	457	83
Career totals			488	92	33	7	521	99
