= Alf Nelmes =

English footballer

Personal information
- Full name: Alfred Nelmes
- Date of birth: 1871
- Place of birth: Bristol, England
- Date of death: February 1940 (aged 68–69)
- Position: Wing half

Senior career*
Years	Team	Apps	(Gls)
1892–1893	Saltburn		
1893–1898	Middlesbrough		
1898–1906	Grimsby Town	219	(14)
1906–1907	Burton United	35	(2)
1907–1908	Brighton & Hove Albion		
1908	Ilkeston United		
1908–190?	Gresley Rovers		
- * Club domestic league appearances and goals

Alfred Nelmes (1871 – February 1940) was an English professional footballer who played as a wing half.
