= 1981–82 Football League Group Cup =

Tournament details
- Country: England; Wales
- Dates: 15 August 1981 – 6 April 1982
- Teams: 32

Final positions
- Champions: Grimsby Town (1st title)
- Runners-up: Wimbledon

Tournament statistics
- Matches played: 55
- Goals scored: 131 (2.38 per match)

The 1981–82 Football League Group Cup was the first edition of the tournament that replaced the Anglo-Scottish Cup. It was won by Grimsby Town, who beat Wimbledon 3–2 in the final at Blundell Park.

== First round ==
=== Group A ===
Home team	Result	Away team	Date
Burnley	4–2	Carlisle United	15 August 1981
Preston North End	2–1	Blackpool	15 August 1981
Carlisle United	1–0	Blackpool	18 August 1981
Preston North End	0–1	Burnley	18 August 1981
Blackpool	0–0	Burnley	22 August 1981
Carlisle United	3–0	Preston North End	22 August 1981

Team	Pld	W	D	L	GF	GA	GD	BP	Pts
Burnley	3	2	1	0	5	2	+3	1	8
Carlisle United	3	2	0	1	6	4	+2	1	7
Preston North End	3	1	0	2	2	5	-3	0	3
Blackpool	3	0	1	2	1	3	-2	0	1

=== Group B ===
Home team	Result	Away team	Date
Bradford City	2–1	Hull City	15 August 1981
Hartlepool United	0–1	Rotherham United	15 August 1981
Hull City	0–1	Rotherham United	18 August 1981
Hartlepool United	0–1	Bradford City	19 August 1981
Bradford City	3–0	Rotherham United	22 August 1981
Hull City	1–0	Hartlepool United	22 August 1981

Team	Pld	W	D	L	GF	GA	GD	BP	Pts
Bradford City	3	3	0	0	6	1	+5	1	10
Rotherham United	3	2	0	1	2	3	-1	0	6
Hull City	3	1	0	2	2	3	-1	0	3
Hartlepool United	3	0	0	3	0	3	-3	0	0

=== Group C ===
Home team	Result	Away team	Date
Grimsby Town	1–0	Chesterfield	15 August 1981
Sheffield United	2–1	Doncaster Rovers	15 August 1981
Doncaster Rovers	2–0	Chesterfield	18 August 1981
Grimsby Town	2–0	Sheffield United	18 August 1981
Chesterfield	1–1	Sheffield United	21 August 1981
Doncaster Rovers	0–2	Grimsby Town	22 August 1981

Team	Pld	W	D	L	GF	GA	GD	BP	Pts
Grimsby Town	3	3	0	0	5	0	+5	0	9
Doncaster Rovers	3	1	0	2	3	4	-1	0	3
Sheffield United	3	1	1	1	3	4	-1	0	3
Chesterfield	3	0	1	2	1	4	-3	0	1

=== Group D ===
Home team	Result	Away team	Date
Lincoln City	1–1	Notts County	15 August 1981
Norwich City	2–2	Peterborough United	15 August 1981
Lincoln City	0–1	Norwich City	18 August 1981
Peterborough United	3–1	Notts County	19 August 1981
Norwich City	3–0	Notts County	22 August 1981
Peterborough United	3–1	Lincoln City	22 August 1981

Team	Pld	W	D	L	GF	GA	GD	BP	Pts
Peterborough United	3	2	1	0	8	4	+4	2	9
Norwich City	3	2	1	0	6	2	+4	1	8
Lincoln City	3	0	1	2	2	5	-3	0	3
Notts County	3	0	1	2	2	7	-5	0	1

=== Group E ===
Home team	Result	Away team	Date
Bolton Wanderers	0–2	Shrewsbury Town	15 August 1981
Bury	1–2	Chester	15 August 1981
Bury	2–2	Bolton Wanderers	18 August 1981
Shrewsbury Town	1–0	Chester	18 August 1981
Bury	3–2	Shrewsbury Town	22 August 1981
Chester	1–2	Bolton Wanderers	22 August 1981

Team	Pld	W	D	L	GF	GA	GD	BP	Pts
Shrewsbury Town	3	2	0	1	5	3	+2	0	6
Bury	3	1	1	1	6	6	0	1	5
Bolton Wanderers	3	1	1	1	4	5	-1	0	4
Chester	3	1	0	2	3	4	-1	0	3

=== Group F ===
Home team	Result	Away team	Date
Newport County	0–0	Torquay United	15 August 1981
Plymouth Argyle	0–0	Bournemouth	15 August 1981
Bournemouth	1–1	Torquay United	18 August 1981
Newport County	2–1	Plymouth Argyle	18 August 1981
Torquay United	1–1	Plymouth Argyle	21 August 1981
Bournemouth	0–0	Newport County	22 August 1981

Team	Pld	W	D	L	GF	GA	GD	BP	Pts
Newport County	3	1	2	0	2	1	+1	0	5
Bournemouth	3	0	3	0	1	1	0	0	3
Torquay United	3	0	3	0	2	2	0	0	3
Plymouth Argyle	3	0	2	1	2	3	-1	0	2

=== Group G ===
Home team	Result	Away team	Date
Oxford United	0–1	Aldershot	15 August 1981
Watford	4–1	Reading	15 August 1981
Oxford United	2–4	Watford	19 August 1981
Reading	4–0	Aldershot	19 August 1981
Aldershot	1–1	Watford	22 August 1981
Reading	2–0	Oxford United	22 August 1981

Team	Pld	W	D	L	GF	GA	GD	BP	Pts
Watford	3	2	1	0	9	4	+5	2	9
Reading	3	2	0	1	7	4	+2	1	7
Aldershot	3	1	1	1	2	5	-3	0	4
Oxford United	3	0	0	3	2	7	-5	0	0

=== Group H ===
Home team	Result	Away team	Date
Orient	2–0	Southend United	15 August 1981
Wimbledon	4–0	Gillingham	15 August 1981
Orient	0–1	Wimbledon	18 August 1981
Gillingham	0–0	Southend United	19 August 1981
Gillingham	1–1	Orient	22 August 1981
Southend United	1–2	Wimbledon	24 August 1981

Team	Pld	W	D	L	GF	GA	GD	BP	Pts
Wimbledon	3	3	0	0	7	1	+6	1	10
Orient	3	1	1	1	3	2	+1	0	4
Gillingham	3	0	2	1	1	5	-4	0	2
Southend United	3	0	1	2	1	4	-3	0	1

== Quarter-finals ==
Home team	Result	Away team	Date
Burnley	2–1	Watford	8 December 1981
Newport County	0–2	Grimsby Town	8 December 1981
Bradford City	1–1 (Note: Shrewsbury Town won 4-3 on penalties)	Shrewsbury Town	9 December 1981
Peterborough United	0–1	Wimbledon	3 February 1982

== Semi-finals ==
Home team	Result	Away team	Date	Attendance
Grimsby Town	2–1	Shrewsbury Town	19 January 1982	3,253
Wimbledon	5–0	Burnley	16 February 1982	1,267

== Final ==
6 April 1982
19:30 BST

Grimsby Town	3 – 2	Wimbledon

Blundell Park, Cleethorpes
Attendance: 3,423
