= Football League Group Cup =

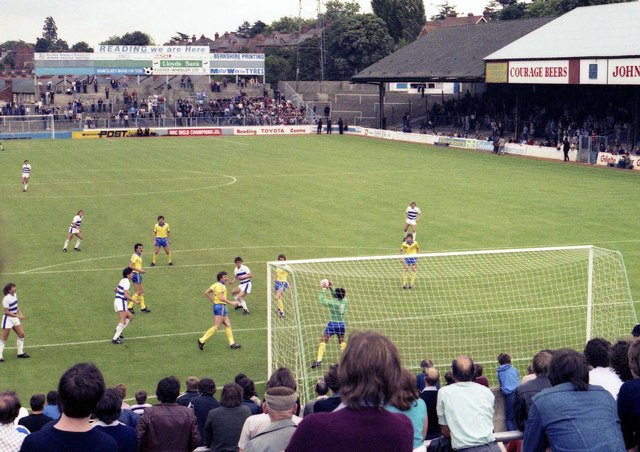
- A Football League Group Cup game between Reading (blue and white) and Oxford United (yellow and blue) at Reading's Elm Park in August 1981.
- Organiser(s): English Football League
- Founded: 1981
- Abolished: 1983
- Region: England
- Teams: 32
- Most championships: Grimsby Town and Millwall (1 Title each)

The Football League Group Cup was a short-lived football competition which first took place during the 1981–82 season. For English clubs it was a replacement for the Anglo-Scottish Cup, which had been discontinued due to the withdrawal of Scottish League clubs. For the 1982–83 season it was renamed as the Football League Trophy.

It is considered as the forerunner of the Associate Members' Cup (which was later renamed the Football League Trophy, and has had various sponsored names), which commenced from the 1983–84 season, although some sources regard the Football League Group Cup as the same competition.

== Format ==
In each season there were 32 participants, split into eight regional groups of four teams each, with three round-robin games played by each side. The eight group winners qualified for the quarter finals, and the knockout stages were played as a single leg, with the game going to extra time and penalties if necessary. The final was played on the home ground of one of the two teams.

== 1981–82 ==
=== Participants ===
The following 32 sides played in the competition, and these are sub-divided according to the League division they played in that season.

- Football League First Division: Notts County
- Football League Second Division: Bolton Wanderers, Grimsby Town, Norwich City, Orient, Rotherham United, Shrewsbury Town, Watford (7 teams)
- Football League Third Division: Burnley, Carlisle United, Chester, Chesterfield, Doncaster Rovers, Gillingham, Lincoln City, Newport County, Oxford United, Plymouth Argyle, Preston North End, Reading, Southend United, Wimbledon (14)
- Football League Fourth Division: AFC Bournemouth, Aldershot, Blackpool, Bradford City, Bury, Hartlepool United, Hull City, Peterborough United, Sheffield United, Torquay United (10)

The tournament was won by Grimsby Town, who defeated Wimbledon 3–2 in the final at Blundell Park on Tuesday 6 April 1982.

== 1982–83 ==
=== Participants ===
The following 32 sides played in the competition, and these are sub-divided according to the League division they played in that season.

- Football League First Division: Norwich City, Watford
- Football League Second Division: Crystal Palace, Grimsby Town, Shrewsbury Town
- Football League Third Division: AFC Bournemouth, Bradford City, Brentford, Chesterfield, Exeter City, Lincoln City, Millwall, Newport County, Orient, Oxford United, Reading, Sheffield United, Southend United (13 teams)
- Football League Fourth Division: Aldershot, Bristol City, Chester, Colchester United, Halifax Town, Hartlepool United, Hull City, Mansfield Town, Northampton Town, Peterborough United, Scunthorpe United, Torquay United, Tranmere Rovers, Wimbledon (14)

=== Final ===
The tournament was won by Millwall, who defeated Lincoln City 3–2 in the final at Sincil Bank on Wednesday 20 April 1983.
