= Delta Meridian Academy =

Coordinates: 53°33′20.27″N 0°6′5.03″W

Location
- Westward Ho; Grimsby, Lincolnshire, DN34 5AH; England

Information
- Type: Academy
- Established: July 1964
- Department for Education URN: 137196 Tables
- Ofsted: Reports
- Chair of Governors: Alan Nicholson
- Interim Principal: Rob Spendlow
- Gender: Mixed
- Age: 11 to 16
- Enrolment: 599
- Colours: Red, Blue, Green, Yellow and Black
- Website: http://www.omacademy.co.uk

Delta Meridian Academy (formerly known as Hereford Technology School and Ormiston Maritime Academy) is a secondary school with academy status in Grimsby, North East Lincolnshire, England.

The school has an intake of 1,048 pupils, aged 11 to 16.

In the last Ofsted report under its former name, Hereford Technology School, the school was found to have a larger proportion of pupils with disabilities or special learning requirements than is found on average nationally. The school has facilities to address these needs, and Extended Services for pupils and parents. The school gained specialist technology status in 2000, and moved into a new building in October 2010.

The school gained Academy status on 1 August 2011 when it became Ormiston Maritime Academy. It was sponsored by the Ormiston Academies Trust until 2 November 2026 when it became part of the Delta Academies Trust.

== Notable alumni ==
- Jane Andrews—murderer of Tom Cressman
- Stuart Carrington—professional snooker player
- Gary Lloyd—West End theatre director and choreographer
- Danny North—footballer, formerly of Grimsby Town, subsequent League of Ireland and FAI Cup winner
- Andrew Pettit (LLB)—businessman, Co-Founder of Revcap, joint majority owner of Grimsby Town Football Club
