= All Town Aren't We =

Documentary TV series about Grimsby Town FC

- Genre: Documentary
- Directed by: Jack Spring
- Starring: Thomas Turgoose; Lloyd Griffith; Jason Stockwood; Andrew Pettit; Paul Hurst; Debbie Cook; Gary Croft; Chris Doig; John McAtee; Sean Scannell; Luke Waterfall; Ryan Reynolds; Rob McElhenney
- Country of origin: United Kingdom
- Original language: English
- No. of seasons: 1
- No. of episodes: 3

Production
- Producers: Jack Spring; Giles Alderson
- Production company: Shush Films

Original release
- Network: Amazon Prime Video
- Release: 5 January 2024

All Town Aren’t We is a British sports documentary television series that premiered on Amazon Prime Video on 5 January 2024. The three-part series follows Grimsby Town during their 2021–22 season in the National League, documenting the club's recovery from relegation and its emotional return to the English Football League via the play-offs.

== Premise ==
The series provides insight into the clubs 2021–22 season, featuring insight from fans, players and staff as the club aim for promotion back to the Football League following relegation in the previous season . It captures key moments such as the takeover of the club by local businessmen Jason Stockwood and Andrew Pettit, the return of manager Paul Hurst. Famous fans Thomas Turgoose and Lloyd Griffith feature prominently.

== Production ==
Directed by lifelong Grimsby fan Jack Spring, the show was produced by Shush Films, with full cooperation from the club. It was filmed throughout the 2021–22 season and includes match footage, training ground access, and fan interviews.

== Episodes ==
The series consists of three episodes:

All Town Aren't We episodes
No.	Length (in minutes)	Directed by	Featured matches
1	35	Jack Spring	Grimsby Town 1-0 Weymouth; Grimsby Town 4-3 Barnet; Grimsby Town 3-1 Wrexham; Grimsby Town 2-0 Eastleigh; Grimsby Town 6-0 Dover Athletic; Altrincham 2-3 Grimsby Town; Woking 0-1 Grimsby Town; Wealdstone 1-0 Grimsby Town; Grimsby Town 0-1 Notts County; Aldershot Town 2-1 Grimsby Town; Solihull Moors 2-0 Grimsby Town; Dagenham & Redbridge 3-2 Grimsby Town
Covers the threat of relegation, changes in ownership, Paul Hurst's return as manager and the start of the new season.
2	28	Jack Spring	Grimsby Town 2-0 Altrincham; Grimsby Town 2-1 Wealdstone; Notts County 1-2 Grimsby Town; Grimsby Town 3-1 Aldershot Town; Grimsby Town 1-0 Woking; Yeovil Town 0-2 Grimsby Town; Chesterfield 1-4 Grimsby Town; Grimsby Town 2-1 Stockport County; King's Lynn Town 0-1 Grimsby Town; Grimsby Town 2-1 Torquay United; Barnet 2-2 Grimsby Town; Grimsby Town 1-3 Maidenhead United; Grimsby Town 1-0 Boreham Wood; Notts County 1-2 (a.e.t.) Grimsby Town
Follows the club's rebuilding efforts and pursuit of a play-off place.
3	42	Jack Spring	Wrexham 4-5 (a.e.t.) Grimsby Town; Solihull Moors 1-2 (a.e.t.) Grimsby Town
Focuses on the dramatic play-off campaign, including the semi-final win over Wrexham and promotion secured at the London Stadium.

== Cast ==
- Thomas Turgoose – Actor and Grimsby Town fan
- Lloyd Griffith – Comedian and Grimsby Town fan
- Jason Stockwood – Grimsby Town chairman
- Andrew Pettit – Grimsby Town co-owner
- Paul Hurst – Grimsby Town manager
- Debbie Cook – Grimsby Town Chief Executive
- Gary Croft – BBC commentator and former Grimsby Town player
- Chris Doig – Grimsby Town assistant manager
- John McAtee – Grimsby Town player
- Sean Scannell – Grimsby Town player
- Luke Waterfall – Grimsby Town player
- Harry Clifton – Grimsby Town player
- Shaun Pearson – Grimsby Town player
- Dave Moore – Grimsby Town physiotherapist
- Phillip Norton – BBC journalist and Grimsby Town fan
- John Tondeur – BBC commentator and Grimsby Town fan
- Gavan Holohan – Grimsby Town player
- Jordan Maguire-Drew – Grimsby Town player
- Giles Coke – Grimsby Town player
- Alan Buckley – Former Grimsby Town manager
- Max Crocombe – Grimsby Town player
- Jordan Cropper – Grimsby Town player
- Michee Efete – Grimsby Town player
- Ryan Reynolds – Wrexham AFC co-owner
- Rob McElhenney – Wrexham AFC co-owner

== Reception ==
All Town Aren’t We received praise for its emotional depth and grassroots storytelling. Critics highlighted it as a rare portrayal of lower-league football with honesty and care. Entertainment.ie called it “one of the most breathtaking sporting stories of all time.”

== Release ==
Following its release, the documentary sparked increased interest in the club, including boosted merchandise sales and local screenings at Parkway Cinema in Cleethorpes.
