= Tom Culshaw =

English football coach

Personal information
- Full name: Thomas Culshaw
- Date of birth: 15 May 1979 (age 47)
- Place of birth: Liverpool, England
- Position: Defender

Team information
- Current team: Grimsby Town (assistant head coach)

Youth career
- 1993–1996: Liverpool

Senior career*
Years	Team	Apps	(Gls)
1996–2000	Liverpool	0	(0)

International career
- England U15
- England U16

Managerial career
- 2011–2015: Liverpool Academy
- 2015–2017: Liverpool (youth coach)
- 2017–2018: Liverpool U18 (assistant)
- 2018–2021: Rangers (technical coach)
- 2021–2022: Aston Villa (technical coach)
- 2023–2025: Al-Ettifaq (technical coach)
- 2026–: Grimsby Town (assistant head coach)
- * Club domestic league appearances and goals

Thomas "Tom" Culshaw is an English professional football coach who is the assistant head coach of EFL League Two club Grimsby Town.

A former Liverpool academy player and reserve-team captain, Culshaw represented England at schoolboy level before beginning a coaching career following his release from Liverpool.

After returning to Liverpool's academy as a coach in 2011, Culshaw progressed through a number of youth coaching roles before becoming assistant manager of the club's under-18 side under former teammate Steven Gerrard.

He subsequently followed Gerrard to Rangers, Aston Villa and Al-Ettifaq, serving as a first-team technical coach at each club before returning to England to join Grimsby Town in 2026.

== Playing career ==
Culshaw came through the youth system at Liverpool, having joined the club as a schoolboy after representing England at under-15 and under-16 level. He later signed professional terms at the age of 17 and captained Liverpool's reserve team, training alongside players including Robbie Fowler, Steve McManaman and Jamie Redknapp.

After leaving Liverpool, Culshaw underwent trials with Football League clubs but chose not to accept offers before leaving professional football. Following a period working outside the game, he rediscovered his passion for football while coaching children in Spain before returning to Liverpool to pursue a coaching career.

== Coaching career ==
=== Liverpool ===
Following his return from Spain, Culshaw rejoined Liverpool in 2011 as an academy coach after previously working for the club's Foundation College. Initially coaching the club's under-13 side, Culshaw later worked across several academy age groups before being appointed assistant manager of Liverpool's under-18 team in July 2017 under former teammate Steven Gerrard. Gerrard cited Culshaw's coaching ability and his long-standing knowledge of Liverpool's academy players as key reasons for appointing him to his backroom staff. During the 2017–18 season, Culshaw helped Liverpool reach the semi-finals of the UEFA Youth League and the final of the FA Youth Cup, while also contributing to the development of a number of players who later progressed into senior football.

=== Rangers ===
In June 2018, Culshaw left Liverpool to join Steven Gerrard’s backroom staff at Rangers as the club's technical coach, alongside Michael Beale, Gary McAllister and Jordan Milsom.

During his three-and-a-half years at Ibrox, Culshaw was part of the coaching staff that guided Rangers to the 2020–21 Scottish Premiership, ending the club's ten-year wait for a league title while completing the campaign unbeaten.

=== Aston Villa ===
In November 2021, Culshaw followed Gerrard to the Premier League after he was appointed technical coach at Aston Villa as part of Gerrard's newly assembled backroom staff.

He remained with Aston Villa until October 2022 following Gerrard's departure from the club.

=== Al-Ettifaq ===
Following a period away from first-team coaching, Culshaw reunited with Gerrard in July 2023 when he was appointed technical coach at Saudi Pro League club Al-Ettifaq.

Culshaw formed part of Gerrard's coaching staff again alongside Jordan Milsom and later worked with former Rangers goalkeeper Andy Firth following his arrival as assistant goalkeeping coach in 2024.

=== Grimsby Town ===
In 2026, Culshaw returned to English football when he was appointed assistant head coach of Grimsby Town, once again linking up with former Liverpool academy colleague Ray Shearwood as part of David Artell’s backroom staff.
