= 2015–16 Leicester City F.C. season =

111th season in existence of Leicester City

Leicester City
2015–16 season
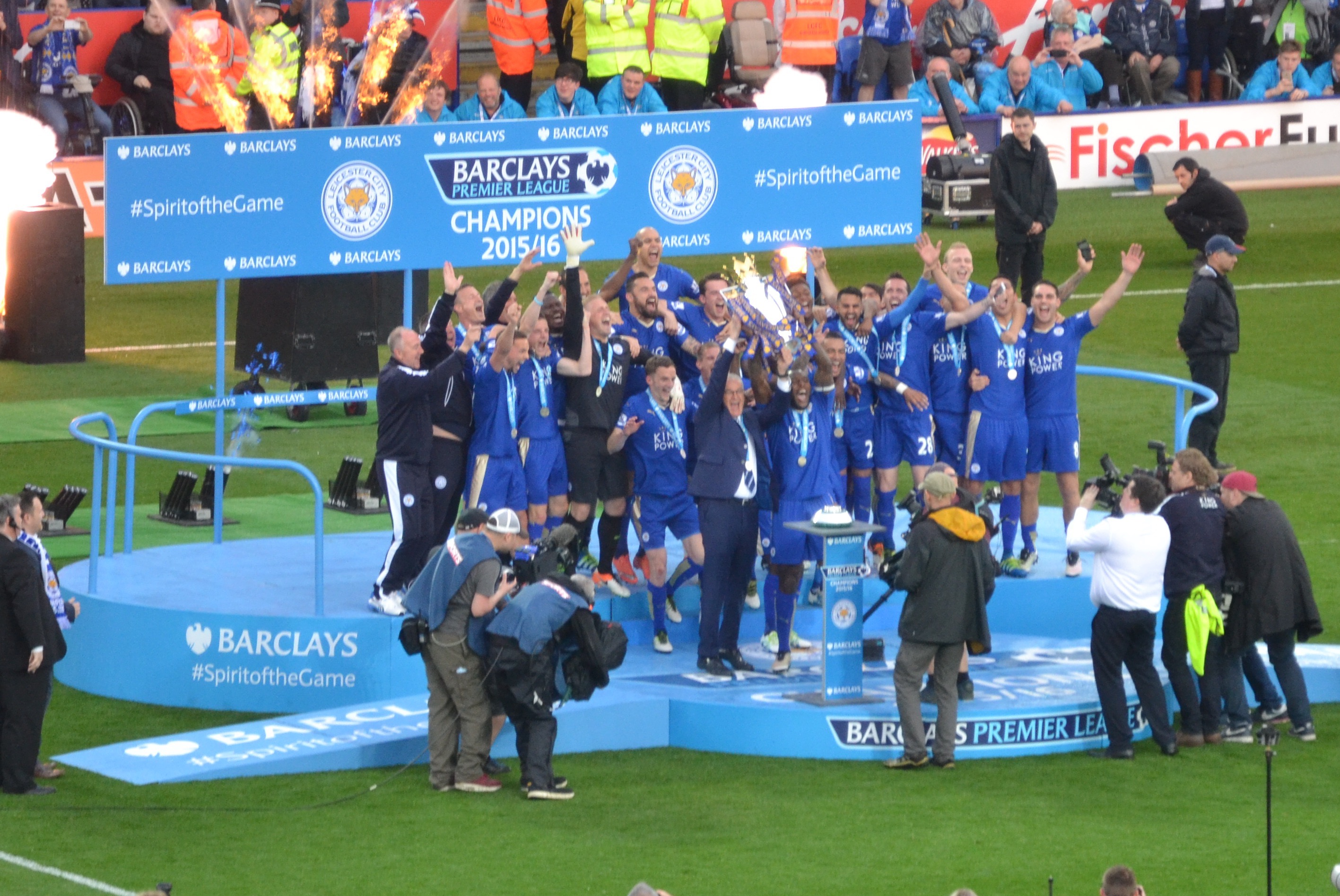
- Leicester City lifting the Premier League trophy in May 2016
- Owner: King Power
- Chairman: Vichai Srivaddhanaprabha
- Manager: Claudio Ranieri
- Stadium: King Power Stadium
- Premier League: 1st
- FA Cup: Third round
- League Cup: Fourth round
- Top goalscorer: League: Jamie Vardy (24); All: Jamie Vardy (24)
- Highest home attendance: 32,242
- Lowest home attendance: 31,824
- Average home league attendance: 32,021
Home colours	Away colours	Third colours

The 2015–16 season was Leicester City Football Club's 111th season in the English football league system and their 48th (non-consecutive) season in the top tier of English football, and the second consecutive season. During the season, Leicester participated in the Premier League, as well as the FA Cup and League Cup.

In what was described as one of the greatest sporting stories of all time, Leicester were confirmed as champions of the 2015–16 Premier League season on 2 May 2016, finishing top of England's highest league for the first time in the club's history. The club was a 5000–1 underdog with bookmakers to win the division before the season kicked off. The feat meant that Leicester would be playing in the UEFA Champions League the following season, a first for the club in their history.

The season also saw history be made for individual players within the team, as striker Jamie Vardy broke the record for consecutive games with a goal in the Premier League (11) and winger Riyad Mahrez became both the first African and Algerian player to be the recipient of the PFA Players' Player of the Year.

== Season summary ==
=== Pre-season ===
On 21 May 2015, Leicester City confirmed their first three pre-season friendlies against Lincoln City, Mansfield Town and Birmingham City. On 22 May 2015, Leicester City added a trip to Burton Albion to their pre-season schedule. On 30 June 2015, the Foxes confirmed a friendly against Rotherham United.

On 14 June 2015, Marcin Wasilewski signed a one-year contract. On 2 July 2015, Dean Hammond signed a one-year contract extension until the summer of 2016.

Leicester's first pre-season match was a 3–1 away win over Lincoln City on 21 July 2015. Four days later, they drew 1–1 to Mansfield Town. On 29 July, Leicester travelled to Burton Albion, winning 2–1. The next day, they won away to Rotherham United by the same score. In their last pre-season friendly, Leicester beat Birmingham City 3–2 at St. Andrew's.

=== August ===
Leicester opened their Premier League campaign on 8 August 2015 with a 4–2 victory over Sunderland. Jamie Vardy scored the opener, with a brace from Riyad Mahrez and Marc Albrighton adding to the scoreline. Jermain Defoe and Steven Fletcher’s goals weren’t enough to secure a point for the away side. The next week, Leicester beat West Ham United 2–1 at Upton Park thanks to Mahrez and Shinji Okazaki; Dimitri Payet scored the only goal for the home side. On 22 August 2015, Mahrez rescued a point against Tottenham Hotspur after Dele Alli scored the opener. On 25 August, Leicester travelled to Bury for their second round League Cup tie, running out 4–1 winners. Joe Dodoo scored a hat-trick and another was dispatched by Andrej Kramarić, while Danny Mayor scored the only goal for the League One side. On 29 August, Vardy scored a late penalty to rescue a point away to Bournemouth, after Callum Wilson scored for the home side in the first half.

=== September ===
On 13 September, Leicester found themselves 2–0 down at home to Aston Villa, with Jack Grealish and Carles Gil on the scoresheet. The Foxes would launch a second half comeback, as goals from Vardy, Ritchie De Laet and Nathan Dyer put them 3–2 up. On 19 September, they found themselves trailing 2–0 again, this time away to Stoke City. Mahrez dispatched a penalty before Vardy scored the equaliser. On 22 September, Leicester beat West Ham United in extra time in the third round of the League Cup. Dodoo scored an early goal before Mauro Zárate equalised for the visitors. Andy King scored the winner in the 116th minute. On 26 September, Leicester faced Arsenal at the King Power Stadium. A brace from Vardy was not enough to beat the Gunners, as they lost 5–2; Theo Walcott scored the equaliser after falling 1–0 behind before Alexis Sánchez scored a hat-trick, and Olivier Giroud scored the fifth for Arsenal.

=== October ===
Leicester began October with a 2–1 victory over Norwich City, as Vardy scored a penalty and Jeffrey Schlupp added to the scoreline. On 17 October, Southampton led Leicester 2–0 before the interval. A brace from Vardy secured a point for the Foxes. On 24 October, Leicester won 1–0 over Crystal Palace, with Vardy on the scoresheet once again. On 27 October, Leicester travelled to Hull City for their fourth round League Cup tie. The match remained goalless until Mahrez scored in extra time, but not before Abel Hernández equalised for the hosts. Leicester would eventually lose the penalty shootout. On 31 October, Leicester made amends for their League Cup exit as they travelled to West Bromwich Albion and ran out as 3–2 winners, with Mahrez scoring a brace and Vardy netting in another goal; this was his eighth consecutive match with at least one goal.

=== November ===
On 7 November, Leicester won 2–1 against Watford. N’Golo Kanté scored his first and only goal for the Foxes, and Vardy dispatched another penalty. Troy Deeney scored the only goal for the visitors, also a penalty. On 21 November, Leicester beat Newcastle United 3–0 at St James’s Park, with goals from Vardy, Okazaki and Leonardo Ulloa. One week later, Vardy set a new record by scoring in 11 consecutive games after he scored against Manchester United; the record was previously held by Ruud van Nistelrooy, who played for United. The match ended in a 1–1 draw, with Bastian Schweinsteiger scoring the equaliser before the break.

=== December ===
On 5 December, Mahrez scored a hat-trick to beat Swansea City 3–0. On 14 December, Leicester beat defending champions Chelsea 2–1, in what proved to be José Mourinho’s final game as manager of the Blues. Mahrez and Vardy were on the scoresheet once again for the Foxes. On 19 December, Leicester beat Everton 3–2 at Goodison Park thanks to two penalties scored by Mahrez and another goal from Okazaki. On Boxing Day, Leicester lost 1–0 to Liverpool at Anfield thanks to a second half goal from Christian Benteke. The defeat ended a nine-match unbeaten run for the Foxes. On 29 December, their last game of the calendar year, Leicester hosted Manchester City in a goalless draw. As a result, Leicester missed the opportunity to maintain their position at the top of the table, as Arsenal, who beat Bournemouth 2–0 the day before, moved to first on goal difference.

=== January ===
In their first game of 2016, Leicester were held to another goalless draw against Bournemouth, during which Leicester were given a penalty; Mahrez's shot was saved by Artur Boruc. This meant that Leicester missed the opportunity to top the table again, as Arsenal’s 1–0 win over Newcastle saw them move two points clear of the Foxes. On 10 January, Leicester travelled to White Hart Lane to play against Tottenham Hotspur in the third round of the FA Cup, where they were held to a 2–2 draw. On 13 January, they travelled to White Hart Lane again, this time in the league, where Robert Huth scored a late winner in a 1–0 victory. On 16 January, Okazaki put Leicester ahead against Aston Villa. Mahrez missed another penalty, then in the second half, Rudy Gestede equalised for the hosts. In the FA Cup third round replay at the King Power Stadium, on 20 January, Leicester lost 2–0. The Foxes would make amends for the FA Cup exit by returning to the top of the Premier League with a 3–0 home victory over Stoke on 23 January. They moved three points clear as Manchester City drew 2–2 against West Ham, and Arsenal played a goalless draw against Stoke a week earlier (on the same day Leicester drew against Aston Villa).

=== February ===
On 2 February, Vardy scored from 25 yards out against Liverpool, before adding another in a 2–0 home victory. The result maintained Leicester’s lead in the table. On 6 February, the Foxes travelled to the Etihad Stadium to face second-place Manchester City. The visitors won 3–1 thanks to Mahrez and a brace from Huth; Sergio Agüero scored the consolation goal for City late in the second half. The result saw Leicester move five points clear on top. On 14 February, Leicester took the lead against Arsenal at the Emirates thanks to a penalty by Vardy. In the second half, Leicester were reduced to 10 men as Danny Simpson was sent off, and Theo Walcott would later equalise. Danny Welbeck then scored the winner for Arsenal with the last kick of the game. This cut Leicester’s lead to two points; Arsenal and their north London rivals Tottenham shared the same number of points, however, the latter had a superior goal difference and so they took second place. On 27 February, Leonardo Ulloa scored a late winner against Norwich in a 1–0 victory. Leicester were still two points ahead despite Tottenham's 2–1 win over Swansea. Arsenal fell to third after losing 3–2 to Manchester United at Old Trafford.

=== March ===
On 1 March, Leicester drew 2–2 to West Bromwich Albion. Salomon Rondón scored for the Baggies, before Jonas Olsson scored an own goal to level the score. Leicester took the lead heading into halftime, thanks to Andy King, but Craig Gardner would equalise for the visitors early in the second half. On 5 March, Leicester won 1–0 away to Watford. On 14 March, Leicester hosted Newcastle United in another 1–0 victory. On 19 March, Leicester won 1–0 again, this time against Crystal Palace at Selhurst Park.

=== April ===
On 3 April, Leicester hosted Southampton and won 1–0 once again. On 10 April, Vardy scored both goals in a 2–0 win away to Sunderland. Tottenham's 3–0 win over Manchester United on the same day meant that Leicester were guaranteed UEFA Champions League football for the first time in the club's history. On 17 April, Vardy scored his 19th goal of the season against West Ham. He was then sent off in the second half, after receiving a second yellow card. West Ham would take the lead through a penalty from Andy Carroll and Aaron Cresswell. An injury-time penalty scored by Ulloa rescued a point for Leicester as they maintained their lead at the top of the table. On 24 April, Leicester thrashed Swansea 4–0 thanks to goals from Mahrez, two from Ulloa, and another from Albrighton.

=== May ===
On 1 May, Manchester United took an early lead against Leicester at Old Trafford thanks to Anthony Martial, but minutes later, Wes Morgan equalised for the visitors. Danny Drinkwater was sent off after receiving two yellow cards, and the match ended in a 1–1 draw. This result meant that Leicester were just two points away from being crowned champions, and their title success would be confirmed if Tottenham failed to beat Chelsea the following day.

The title decider came on 2 May 2016, a London derby between Chelsea and Tottenham Hotspur at Stamford Bridge. In the first half of the match, goals from Harry Kane and Son Heung-min put Tottenham 2–0 ahead. After the break, Gary Cahill pulled one back for Chelsea before substitute Eden Hazard scored a late equaliser to end Tottenham's title hopes. At the full time whistle, Leicester were confirmed champions of England, with the home crowd celebrating their former coach Ranieri's achievement.

On 7 May, the newly crowned champions of England beat Everton 3–1, with Vardy scoring 2 goals and King scoring a third. Vardy had the opportunity to complete a hat-trick by converting a penalty, but he would blaze the ball over the crossbar. Their final league match was a 1–1 draw against Chelsea at Stamford Bridge on 15 May. Cesc Fàbregas converted a penalty before Drinkwater equalised for the visitors.

At the end of the season, Leicester City finished with 81 points, winning 23 games, drawing 12, and losing just three. Arsenal secured second after beating relegated Aston Villa 4–0, finishing one point ahead of North London rivals Tottenham, who lost 5–1 away to fellow relegated side Newcastle.

== Kits and sponsorship ==
Supplier: Puma / Sponsor: King Power

Home	2016–17 Home	Away	Third	Goalkeeper 1	Goalkeeper 2	Goalkeeper 3	2016–17 Goalkeeper

== Friendlies ==
Win Draw Loss

21 July 2015 Friendly	Lincoln City	1–3	Leicester City	Lincoln
19:45 BST	Power 10' (pen.)	Report	Mahrez 33'; Kramarić 80'; Vardy 90'	Stadium: Sincil Bank; Attendance: 3,693 (1,384 away); Referee: Darren Drysdale

25 July 2015 Friendly	Mansfield Town	1–1	Leicester City	Mansfield
15:00 BST	Green 27'	Report	Nugent 10'	Stadium: Field Mill; Attendance: 4,273 (1,608 away); Referee: David Coote

28 July 2015 Friendly	Burton Albion	1–2	Leicester City	Burton-upon-Trent
19:30 BST	Duffy 90'	Report	Vardy 65', 72'	Stadium: Pirelli Stadium; Attendance: 3,184; Referee: Steve Martin

29 July 2015 Friendly	Rotherham United	1–2	Leicester City	Rotherham
19:45 BST	Ward 80'	Report	Mahrez 56'; Nugent 72'	Stadium: AESSEAL New York Stadium; Attendance: 3,678 (524 away); Referee: Mark Brown

1 August 2015 Friendly	Birmingham City	2–3	Leicester City	Birmingham
15:00 BST	Cotterill 23'; Gray 24'	Report	Huth 58'; Drinkwater 76'; Okazaki 83'	Stadium: St Andrew's; Attendance: 7,026 (1,731 away); Referee: Graham Scott

== Players and staff ==
=== First team squad ===
- This section lists players who were in Leicester's first team squad at any point during the 2015–16 season.
- Asterisks indicates player left mid-season.
- Hash symbol indicates player retired mid-season.
- Italics indicate loan player.

No.	Nat.	Player	Position(s)	Joined in	Signed from
Goalkeepers
1	(Denmark)	Kasper Schmeichel	GK	2011	(England) Leeds United
12	(England)	Ben Hamer	GK	2014	(England) Charlton Athletic
32	(Australia)	Mark Schwarzer	GK	2015	(England) Chelsea
41	(England)	Jonny Maddison	GK	2015	(England) Crawley Town
Defenders
2	(Belgium)	Ritchie De Laet	RB	2012	(England) Manchester United
5	(Jamaica)	Wes Morgan	CB	2012	(England) Nottingham Forest
6	(Germany)	Robert Huth	CB	2015	(England) Stoke City
13	(Ghana)	Daniel Amartey	CB / DM / RB	2016	(Denmark) Copenhagen
17	(England)	Danny Simpson	RB	2014	(England) Queens Park Rangers
18	(England)	Liam Moore	CB / RB	2011	Youth
27	(Poland)	Marcin Wasilewski	CB / RB	2013	(Belgium) Anderlecht
28	(Austria)	Christian Fuchs	LB	2015	(Germany) Schalke 04
29	(Tunisia)	Yohan Benalouane	CB / RB	2015	(Italy) Atalanta
30	(England)	Ben Chilwell	LB	2015	Youth
Midfielders
4	(England)	Danny Drinkwater	CM	2012	(England) Manchester United
8	(England)	Matty James	CM	2012	(England) Manchester United
10	(Wales)	Andy King	CM	2006	Youth
11	(England)	Marc Albrighton	RM / LM	2014	(England) Aston Villa
14	(France)	N'Golo Kanté	CM / DM / RM	2015	(France) Caen
15	(Ghana)	Jeffrey Schlupp	LW / LM / LB / CF	2010	Youth
22	(England)	Demarai Gray	LW / RW	2016	(England) Birmingham City
24	(England)	Nathan Dyer	RW / LW	2015	(Wales) Swansea City
26	(Algeria)	Riyad Mahrez	RW / LW / AM	2014	(France) Le Havre
33	(Switzerland)	Gökhan Inler	CM / DM	2015	(Italy) Napoli
36	(England)	Joe Dodoo	RW / CF / LW	2013	Youth
39	(England)	Andre Olukanmi	RW / LW / AM	2015	Youth
Forwards
9	(England)	Jamie Vardy	CF	2012	(England) Fleetwood Town
16	(Wales)	Tom Lawrence	CF	2014	(England) Manchester United
19	(Croatia)	Andrej Kramarić	CF / LW	2015	(Croatia) Rijeka
20	(Japan)	Shinji Okazaki	CF / LW / RW / AM	2015	(Germany) Mainz 05
23	(Argentina)	Leonardo Ulloa	CF	2014	(England) Brighton & Hove Albion
38	(Saint Kitts and Nevis)	Harry Panayiotou	SS / RW / LW	2012	Youth

=== Staff ===
- This section lists members of staff who were in Leicester's first team squad at any point during the 2015–16 season.
- Asterisks indicate member of staff left mid-season.

Position	Nationality	Name
Manager	(Italy)	Claudio Ranieri
Assistant Manager	(England)	Craig Shakespeare
Assistant Manager	(Italy)	Paolo Benetti
Assistant Manager/Head of Recruitment	(England)	Steve Walsh
First Team Coach/Goalkeeping Coach	(England)	Mike Stowell
Forwards/Strikers Coach	(England)	Kevin Phillips*
Head Physio	(England)	David Rennie
Academy Manager	(England)	Gareth Jennings
Academy Coach (Under 18s)	(England)	Trevor Peake
Academy Coach (Under 16s)	(Spain)	Iñigo Idiakez

== Transfers ==
=== In ===
Date	Position	Nat.	Player	From	Fee
1 July 2015	LB	AUT	Christian Fuchs	(Germany) Schalke 04	Free
1 July 2015	CB	GER	Robert Huth	(England) Stoke City	£3,000,000
1 July 2015	CF	JPN	Shinji Okazaki	(Germany) Mainz 05	£7,000,000
3 August 2015	CM	FRA	N'Golo Kanté	(France) Caen	£5,600,000
3 August 2015	CB	TUN	Yohan Benalouane	(Italy) Atalanta	Undisclosed
19 August 2015	DM	SUI	Gökhan Inler	(Italy) Napoli	£3,000,000
4 January 2016	LW	ENG	Demarai Gray	(England) Birmingham City	£3,700,000
22 January 2016	CB	GHA	Daniel Amartey	(Denmark) Copenhagen	£5,000,000
29 January 2016	GK	DEN	Daniel Iversen	(Denmark) Esbjerg fB	Undisclosed
15 March 2016	LW	BRU	Faiq Bolkiah	(England) Chelsea	Free

Total spending: ▼£27,300,000

=== Out ===
Date	Position	Nat.	Player	To	Fee
1 July 2015	CF	NZL	Chris Wood	(England) Leeds United	£3,000,000
14 August 2015	CF	ENG	David Nugent	(England) Middlesbrough	£4,000,000
11 January 2016	CB	ENG	Joe Davis	(England) Fleetwood Town	Undisclosed
20 January 2016	CF	LTU	Simonas Stankevičius	(Lithuania) Žalgiris	Undisclosed

Total incoming: ▲£7,000,000

=== Loans in ===
Date from	Date until	Position	Nat.	Player	From
1 September 2015	End of season	RW	ENG	Nathan Dyer	(Wales) Swansea City

=== Loans out ===
Date from	Date until	Position	Nat.	Player	To
4 August 2015	End of season	LB	ENG	Paul Konchesky	(England) Queens Park Rangers
11 August 2015	End of season (Note: Hamer returned to Leicester on 17 November 2015.)	GK	ENG	Ben Hamer	(England) Bristol City
20 August 2015	3 January 2016	DM	ENG	Ryan Watson	(England) Northampton Town
21 August 2015	23 September 2015	CF	ENG	Jacob Blyth	(England) Cambridge United
21 August 2015	3 January 2016	LW	WAL	Tom Lawrence	(England) Blackburn Rovers
28 August 2015	26 September 2015	CM	ENG	Jak McCourt	(England) Port Vale
28 August 2015	24 November 2015	CF	LTU	Simonas Stankevičius	(England) Oldham Athletic
29 August 2015	3 January 2016	LB	AUS	Callum Elder	(England) Peterborough United (Note: On 22 September 2015, Elder's loan at Peterborough was extended until 3 January 2016.)
1 September 2015	4 January 2016	CB	ENG	Liam Moore	(England) Bristol City
16 September 2015	14 October 2015	RW	WAL	Aaron Hassall	(England) Corby Town
16 September 2015	14 October 2015	CB	FRA	Cédric Kipré	(England) Corby Town
24 September 2015	13 November 2015	AM	ENG	Jack Barmby	(England) Notts County
19 November 2015	3 January 2016	DF	ENG	Ben Chilwell	(England) Huddersfield Town
19 November 2015	18 December 2015	FW	ENG	Joe Dodoo	(England) Bury
20 January 2016	End of season	FW	CRO	Andrej Kramarić	(Germany) 1899 Hoffenheim
1 February 2016	End of season	DF	TUN	Yohan Benalouane	(Italy) Fiorentina
1 February 2016	End of season	DF	BEL	Ritchie De Laet	(England) Middlesbrough
22 March 2016	End of season	CF	ENG	Jacob Blyth	(England) Blackpool

=== Released ===
Date	Position	Nat.	Player
30 June 2015	DM	ARG	Esteban Cambiasso
30 June 2015	RW	FRA	Anthony Knockaert
30 June 2015	LB	CIV	Zoumana Bakayogo
30 June 2015	FW	ENG	Marcel Barrington
30 June 2015	RW	ENG	Adam Dawson
30 June 2015	LW	SCO	Paul Gallagher
30 June 2015	CB	ENG	Kieran Kennedy
30 June 2015	GK	IRL	Conrad Logan
30 June 2015	CB	FRA	Hervé Pepe-Ngoma
30 June 2015	CM	ENG	Louis Rowley
30 June 2015	FW	ENG	Gary Taylor-Fletcher

== Competitions ==
Win Draw Loss

=== Overview ===
Competition	First match	Last match	Starting round	Final position	Record							
Competition	First match	Last match	Starting round	Final position	Pld	W	D	L	GF	GA	GD	Win %
Premier League	8 August 2015	15 May 2016	Matchday 1	Winners	38	23	12	3	68	36	+32	60.53
FA Cup	10 January 2016	20 January 2016	Third round	Third round	2	0	1	1	2	4	−2	0.00
Football League Cup	25 August 2015	27 October 2015	Second round	Fourth round	3	2	1	0	7	3	+4	66.67
Total					43	25	14	4	77	43	+34	58.14

Source: Soccerway

=== Premier League ===
==== League table ====
Pos	Team	Pld	W	D	L	GF	GA	GD	Pts	Qualification or relegation
1	Leicester City (C)	38	23	12	3	68	36	+32	81	Qualification for the Champions League group stage
2	Arsenal	38	20	11	7	65	36	+29	71	Qualification for the Champions League group stage
3	Tottenham Hotspur	38	19	13	6	69	35	+34	70	Qualification for the Champions League group stage
4	Manchester City	38	19	9	10	71	41	+30	66	Qualification for the Champions League play-off round
5	Manchester United	38	19	9	10	49	35	+14	66	Qualification for the Europa League group stage (Note: Manchester United qualified for the Europa League group stage by winning the 2015–16 FA Cup. As they had also qualified by their virtue of their league position (5th), this spot was passed to the next-highest ranked team (6th), Southampton.)

Source: Barclays Premier League
Rules for classification: 1) Points; 2) Goal difference; 3) Goals scored; 4) Play-offs (only if needed to decide champion, teams for relegation or teams for UEFA competitions).
(C) Champions

==== Results summary ====
Overall								Home						Away					
Pld	W	D	L	GF	GA	GD	Pts	W	D	L	GF	GA	GD	W	D	L	GF	GA	GD
38	23	12	3	68	36	+32	81	12	6	1	35	18	+17	11	6	2	33	18	+15

Source: Premier League

==== Results by matchday ====
Matchday	1	2	3	4	5	6	7	8	9	10	11	12	13	14	15	16	17	18	19	20	21	22	23	24	25	26	27	28	29	30	31	32	33	34	35	36	37	38
Ground	H	A	H	A	H	A	H	A	A	H	A	H	A	H	A	H	A	A	H	H	A	A	H	H	A	A	H	H	A	H	A	H	A	H	H	A	H	A
Result	W	W	D	D	W	D	L	W	D	W	W	W	W	D	W	W	W	L	D	D	W	D	W	W	W	L	W	D	W	W	W	W	W	D	W	D	W	D
Position	1	1	2	3	2	3	6	4	5	5	3	3	1	2	1	1	1	1	2	2	2	1	1	1	1	1	1	1	1	1	1	1	1	1	1	1	1	1

Source: Statto
A = Away; H = Home; W = Win; D = Draw; L = Loss

==== Matches ====
On 17 June 2015, the fixtures for the forthcoming season were announced.

8 August 2015 1	Leicester City	4–2	Sunderland	Leicester
15:00 BST	Vardy 11', (yellow card) 49'; Mahrez 18', 25' (pen.); Albrighton 66'; Schlupp (yellow card) 90'	Report	Rodwell (yellow card) 17'; Jones (yellow card) 42'; Defoe 60'; Fletcher 71'; Kaboul (yellow card) 73'; Coates (yellow card) 85'	Stadium: King Power Stadium; Attendance: 32,242; Referee: Lee Mason

15 August 2015 2	West Ham United	1–2	Leicester City	London
15:00 BST	Jenkinson (yellow card) 40'; Payet 55'; Adrián (red card) 90+2'	Report	Vardy (yellow card) 11'; Okazaki 27', (yellow card) 54'; Mahrez 38'; Benalouane (yellow card) 88'	Stadium: Upton Park; Attendance: 34,857; Referee: Anthony Taylor

22 August 2015 3	Leicester City	1–1	Tottenham Hotspur	Leicester
15:00 BST	Mahrez 82'; King (yellow card) 90+1'	Report	Dembélé (yellow card) 29'; Lamela (yellow card) 31'; Dier (yellow card) 60'; Alli 81'; Mason (yellow card) 83'	Stadium: King Power Stadium; Attendance: 31,971; Referee: Martin Atkinson

29 August 2015 4	Bournemouth	1–1	Leicester City	Bournemouth
15:00 BST	Gradel (yellow card) 1'; Wilson 24'; O'Kane (yellow card) 75'	Report	De Laet (yellow card) 13'; King (yellow card) 36'; Huth (yellow card) 48'; Vardy 86' (pen.); Schlupp (yellow card) 90+2'	Stadium: Dean Court; Attendance: 11,155; Referee: Neil Swarbrick

13 September 2015 5	Leicester City	3–2	Aston Villa	Leicester
16:00 BST	Albrighton (yellow card) 45+1'; De Laet 72'; Vardy 82'; Dyer (yellow card) 77', (goal) 89'	Report	Grealish 39'; Gil 63'; Amavi (yellow card) 81'	Stadium: King Power Stadium; Attendance: 31,733; Referee: Mike Dean

19 September 2015 6	Stoke City	2–2	Leicester City	Stoke-on-Trent
15:00 BST	Bojan 13', (yellow card) 70'; Walters 20'	Report	Mahrez 51' (pen.), (yellow card) 58'; Kanté (yellow card) 60'; Vardy 69'; Drinkwater (yellow card) 78'; Schlupp (yellow card) 81'	Stadium: Britannia Stadium; Attendance: 27,642; Referee: Andre Marriner

26 September 2015 7	Leicester City	2–5	Arsenal	Leicester
15:00 BST	Vardy 13', 89'	Report	Walcott 18'; Sánchez 33', 57', 81'; Arteta (yellow card) 69'; Giroud 90+3'	Stadium: King Power Stadium; Attendance: 32,047; Referee: Craig Pawson

3 October 2015 8	Norwich City	1–2	Leicester City	Norwich
15:00 BST	Mbokani 68'	Report	Vardy 28' (pen.); Schlupp 47'; Huth (yellow card) 63'	Stadium: Carrow Road; Attendance: 27,067; Referee: Mark Clattenburg

17 October 2015 9	Southampton	2–2	Leicester City	Southampton
15:00 BST	Fonte 21'; Wanyama (yellow card) 22'; Van Dijk 37'; Bertrand (yellow card) 76'	Report	Vardy 66', 90+1'	Stadium: St Mary's Stadium; Attendance: 31,559; Referee: Paul Tierney

24 October 2015 10	Leicester City	1–0	Crystal Palace	Leicester
15:00 BST	Vardy 60', (yellow card) 90'; Simpson (yellow card) 65'; Schlupp (yellow card) 68'	Report	Zaha (yellow card) 87'	Stadium: King Power Stadium; Attendance: 31,752; Referee: Mike Dean

31 October 2015 11	West Bromwich Albion	2–3	Leicester City	West Bromwich
15:00 GMT	Rondón 30'; Lambert 86' (pen.)	Report	Mahrez 57', 64'; Vardy 77'; Huth (yellow card) 89'; Schmeichel (yellow card) 90+3'	Stadium: The Hawthorns; Attendance: 24,150; Referee: Anthony Taylor

7 November 2015 12	Leicester City	2–1	Watford	Leicester
15:00 GMT	Kanté 52'; Vardy 65' (pen.)	Report	Gomes (yellow card) 64'; Deeney 75' (pen.)	Stadium: King Power Stadium; Attendance: 32,029; Referee: Roger East

21 November 2015 13	Newcastle United	0–3	Leicester City	Newcastle upon Tyne
15:00 GMT	Anita (yellow card) 36'; Dummett (yellow card) 48'; Pérez (yellow card) 76'; Sissoko (yellow card) 79'	Report	Huth (yellow card) 31'; Vardy 45+1'; Ulloa 62'; Okazaki 83'	Stadium: St James' Park; Attendance: 50,151; Referee: Mike Jones

28 November 2015 14	Leicester City	1–1	Manchester United	Leicester
17:30 GMT	Vardy 24'	Report	Young (yellow card) 14'; Schweinsteiger 45+1'	Stadium: King Power Stadium; Attendance: 32,115; Referee: Craig Pawson

5 December 2015 15	Swansea City	0–3	Leicester City	Swansea
15:00 GMT	Britton (yellow card) 47'; Ki (yellow card) 74'	Report	Mahrez 5', 22', 67'; Kanté (yellow card) 23'; Simpson (yellow card) 70'; Albrighton (yellow card) 90+1'	Stadium: Liberty Stadium; Attendance: 20,836; Referee: Michael Oliver

14 December 2015 16	Leicester City	2–1	Chelsea	Leicester
20:00 GMT	Vardy 34', (yellow card) 46'; Mahrez 48'; Huth (yellow card) 50'	Report	Rémy 77'	Stadium: King Power Stadium; Attendance: 32,054; Referee: Mark Clattenburg

19 December 2015 17	Everton	2–3	Leicester City	Liverpool
15:00 GMT	Lukaku 32'; Funes Mori (yellow card) 61'; Howard (yellow card) 64'; Mirallas 89'	Report	Mahrez 27' (pen.), 65' (pen.); Okazaki 69'; Wasilewski (yellow card) 81'	Stadium: Goodison Park; Attendance: 39,570; Referee: Jon Moss

26 December 2015 18	Liverpool	1–0	Leicester City	Liverpool
15:00 GMT	Lallana (yellow card) 45+1'; Can (yellow card) 52'; Benteke 63'	Report	Huth (yellow card) 62'	Stadium: Anfield; Attendance: 44,123; Referee: Martin Atkinson

29 December 2015 19	Leicester City	0–0	Manchester City	Leicester
19:45 GMT	Albrighton (yellow card) 81'	Report	Kolarov (yellow card) 67'; Mangala (yellow card) 76'; De Bruyne (yellow card) 90'	Stadium: King Power Stadium; Attendance: 32,072; Referee: Craig Pawson

2 January 2016 20	Leicester City	0–0	Bournemouth	Leicester
15:00 GMT	Mahrez (penalty missed) 59'; Albrighton (yellow card) 62'	Report	Arter (yellow card) 34'; Francis (red card) 57'	Stadium: King Power Stadium; Attendance: 32,006; Referee: Andre Marriner

13 January 2016 21	Tottenham Hotspur	0–1	Leicester City	London
20:00 GMT	Dier (yellow card) 79'	Report	Huth 83'	Stadium: White Hart Lane; Attendance: 35,850; Referee: Lee Mason

16 January 2016 22	Aston Villa	1–1	Leicester City	Birmingham
17:30 GMT	Bunn (yellow card) 14'; Cissokho (yellow card) 32'; Gestede 75'; Bacuna (yellow card) 85'	Report	Okazaki 28'; Mahrez (penalty missed) 33'; Huth (yellow card) 77'; Vardy (yellow card) 85'	Stadium: Villa Park; Attendance: 32,763; Referee: Roger East

23 January 2016 23	Leicester City	3–0	Stoke City	Leicester
15:00 GMT	Drinkwater 41'; Vardy 66'; Ulloa 87'	Report	Shaqiri (yellow card) 59'	Stadium: King Power Stadium; Attendance: 32,018; Referee: Mike Dean

2 February 2016 24	Leicester City	2–0	Liverpool	Leicester
19:45 GMT	Vardy 60', 71'	Report	Lucas (yellow card) 86'	Stadium: King Power Stadium; Attendance: 32,121; Referee: Andre Marriner

6 February 2016 25	Manchester City	1–3	Leicester City	Manchester
12:45 GMT	Zabaleta (yellow card) 69'; Fernando (yellow card) 72'; Agüero 87'	Report	Huth 3', 60'; Morgan (yellow card) 36'; Simpson (yellow card) 46'; Mahrez 48'	Stadium: Etihad Stadium; Attendance: 54,693; Referee: Anthony Taylor

14 February 2016 26	Arsenal	2–1	Leicester City	Holloway, London
12:00 GMT	Coquelin (yellow card) 36'; Koscielny (yellow card) 44'; Ramsey (yellow card) 45+2'; Walcott 70'; Welbeck 90+5', (yellow card) 90+6'	Report	Vardy 45' (pen.); Simpson (yellow card) 49' (yellow-red card) 54'; Fuchs (yellow card) 52'; Kanté (yellow card) 57'; Wasilewski (yellow card) 90+4'	Stadium: Emirates Stadium; Attendance: 60,009; Referee: Martin Atkinson

27 February 2016 27	Leicester City	1–0	Norwich City	Leicester
15:00 GMT	Ulloa 89'	Report	Naismith (yellow card) 48'; Bennett (yellow card) 51'	Stadium: King Power Stadium; Attendance: 32,114; Referee: Neil Swarbrick

1 March 2016 28	Leicester City	2–2	West Bromwich Albion	Leicester
19:45 GMT	Olsson 30' (o.g.); King 45+1'	Report	Rondón 11'; Sessègnon (yellow card) 32'; Gardner 50'; Yacob (yellow card) 88'	Stadium: King Power Stadium; Attendance: 32,018; Referee: Mark Clattenburg

5 March 2016 29	Watford	0–1	Leicester City	Watford
17:30 GMT	Amrabat (yellow card) 29'; Aké (yellow card) 58'	Report	Mahrez 56'; Fuchs (yellow card) 74'; Morgan (yellow card) 90+2'	Stadium: Vicarage Road; Attendance: 20,884; Referee: Jon Moss

14 March 2016 30	Leicester City	1–0	Newcastle United	Leicester
20:00 GMT	Okazaki 25'	Report		Stadium: King Power Stadium; Attendance: 31,824; Referee: Craig Pawson

19 March 2016 31	Crystal Palace	0–1	Leicester City	London
15:00 GMT	Souaré (yellow card) 42'	Report	Schmeichel (yellow card) 30'; Mahrez 34'	Stadium: Selhurst Park; Attendance: 25,041; Referee: Mike Jones

3 April 2016 32	Leicester City	1–0	Southampton	Leicester
13:30 BST	Morgan 38'; Drinkwater (yellow card) 51'; Fuchs (yellow card) 88'	Report	Wanyama (yellow card) 46'; Tadić (yellow card) 75'	Stadium: King Power Stadium; Attendance: 32,071; Referee: Michael Oliver

10 April 2016 33	Sunderland	0–2	Leicester City	Sunderland
13:30 BST	Borini (yellow card) 21'	Report	Fuchs (yellow card) 30'; Vardy 66', 90+5'	Stadium: Stadium of Light; Attendance: 46,531; Referee: Anthony Taylor

17 April 2016 34	Leicester City	2–2	West Ham United	Leicester
13:30 BST	Vardy 18', (yellow card) 28' (yellow-red card) 56'; Morgan (yellow card) 77'; Ulloa 90+5' (pen.)	Report	Reid (yellow card) 30'; Noble (yellow card) 40'; Payet (yellow card) 42'; Carroll 84' (pen.); Cresswell 86'	Stadium: King Power Stadium; Attendance: 32,104; Referee: Jon Moss

24 April 2016 35	Leicester City	4–0	Swansea City	Leicester
16:15 BST	Mahrez 10'; Ulloa 30', 60'; Huth (yellow card) 82'; Albrighton 85'	Report	Fernández (yellow card) 64'; Williams (yellow card) 72'	Stadium: King Power Stadium; Attendance: 31,962; Referee: Mark Clattenburg

1 May 2016 36	Manchester United	1–1	Leicester City	Manchester
14:05 BST	Martial 8'; Lingard (yellow card) 53'; Carrick (yellow card) 57'; Rooney (yellow card) 66'	Report	Morgan 17'; Drinkwater (yellow card) 58' (yellow-red card) 87'	Stadium: Old Trafford; Attendance: 75,275; Referee: Michael Oliver

7 May 2016 37	Leicester City	3–1	Everton	Leicester
17:30 BST	Vardy 5', 65' (pen.), (penalty missed) 72'; King 33'	Report	Pennington (yellow card) 44'; Cleverley (yellow card) 49'; Gibson (yellow card) 71'; Mirallas 88'	Stadium: King Power Stadium; Attendance: 32,140; Referee: Andre Marriner

15 May 2016 38	Chelsea	1–1	Leicester City	London
15:00 BST	Fàbregas 66' (pen.)	Report	Drinkwater 82'	Stadium: Stamford Bridge; Attendance: 41,494; Referee: Craig Pawson

=== FA Cup ===
Leicester City entered the competition in the third round, and were drawn away to Tottenham Hotspur on 7 December 2015.

10 January 2016 Third round	Tottenham Hotspur	2–2	Leicester City	London
16:00 GMT	Eriksen 9'; Kane 90' (pen.); Bentaleb (yellow card) 90+1'	Report	Wasilewski (yellow card) 15', (goal) 19'; Okazaki 48'; Schmeichel (yellow card) 89'	Stadium: White Hart Lane; Attendance: 35,805; Referee: Bobby Madley

20 January 2016 Third round replay	Leicester City	0–2	Tottenham Hotspur	Leicester
19:45 GMT	Albrighton (yellow card) 90'	Report	Davies (yellow card) 20'; Son 39'; Chadli 66'	Stadium: King Power Stadium; Attendance: 30,006; Referee: Anthony Taylor

=== Football League Cup ===
Leicester City entered the competition in the second round and were drawn away to Bury. The third round draw was made on 25 August 2015 live on Sky Sports by Charlie Nicholas and Phil Thompson. Leicester City were drawn at home to West Ham United.

25 August 2015 Second round	Bury	1–4	Leicester City	Bury
19:45 BST	Mayor 49'; Jones (yellow card) 70'	Report	Dodoo 25', 86', 90'; Kramarić 41'	Stadium: Gigg Lane; Attendance: 4,914; Referee: Andrew Madley

22 September 2015 Third round	Leicester City	2–1 (a.e.t.)	West Ham United	Leicester
19:45 BST	Dodoo 6'; Fuchs (yellow card) 35'; Simpson (yellow card) 69'; Schlupp (yellow card) 79'; Wasilewski (yellow card) 108'; King 116'	Report	Zárate 27', (yellow card) 59'; Obiang (yellow card) 67'; Noble (yellow card) 100'	Stadium: King Power Stadium; Attendance: 21,268; Referee: Peter Bankes

27 October 2015 Fourth round	Hull City	1–1 (a.e.t.) (5–4 p)	Leicester City	Hull
19:45 GMT	Hayden (yellow card) 88'; Akpom (yellow card) 92'; Robertson (yellow card) 100'; Hernández 105'	Report	Benalouane (yellow card) 77'; Albrighton (yellow card) 87'; Mahrez 99'	Stadium: KC Stadium; Attendance: 16,818; Referee: Stuart Attwell
	Penalties
	Hernández (penalty scored); Maloney (penalty scored); Huddlestone (penalty scored); Akpom (penalty scored); Meyler (penalty scored)		(penalty missed) Mahrez; (penalty scored) Drinkwater; (penalty scored) Inler; (penalty scored) Wasilewski; (penalty scored) Vardy

== Awards ==
=== Club awards ===
At the end of the season, Leicester's annual award ceremony, including categories voted for by the players and backroom staff, the supporters, saw the players recognized for their achievements for the club throughout the 2015–16 season.

Player of the Year Award	(Algeria) Riyad Mahrez
Young Player of the Year Award	(Ghana) Jeff Schlupp
Players' Player of the Year Award	(France) N'Golo Kanté
Academy Player of the Year Award	(England) Admiral Muskwe
Under-21 Player of the Year Award	(England) Ben Chilwell
Goal of the Season Award	(England) Jamie Vardy vs Liverpool, 2 February 2016
Performance of the Season	vs Manchester City (away), 6 February 2016

=== Divisional awards ===
Date	Nat.	Winner	Award
October 2015	(England)	Jamie Vardy	Premier League Player of the Month
November 2015	(England)	Jamie Vardy	Premier League Player of the Month
November 2015	(Italy)	Claudio Ranieri	Premier League Manager of the Month
March 2016	(Italy)	Claudio Ranieri	Premier League Manager of the Month
April 2016	(Italy)	Claudio Ranieri	Premier League Manager of the Month
Season	(Italy)	Claudio Ranieri	Premier League Manager of the Season
Season	(England)	Jamie Vardy	Premier League Player of the Season
Season	(Algeria)	Riyad Mahrez	PFA Players' Player of the Year
Season	(England)	Jamie Vardy	FWA Footballer of the Year
Season	(Jamaica)	Wes Morgan	PFA Premier League Team of the Year
Season	(France)	N'Golo Kanté	PFA Premier League Team of the Year
Season	(Algeria)	Riyad Mahrez	PFA Premier League Team of the Year
Season	(England)	Jamie Vardy	PFA Premier League Team of the Year

== Player statistics ==
All data from LCFC.com

=== Appearances ===
- Starts + substitute appearances.
- Italics indicates loan player.
- * indicates player left mid-season.
- # indicates player retired mid-season.

No.	Pos	Nat	Player	Total		Premier League		FA Cup		League Cup	
No.	Pos	Nat	Player	Apps	Goals	Apps	Goals	Apps	Goals	Apps	Goals
1	GK	(Denmark) DEN	Kasper Schmeichel	40	0	38	0	2	0	0	0
2	DF	(Belgium) BEL	Ritchie De Laet	15	1	7+5	1	1	0	1+1	0
4	MF	(England) ENG	Danny Drinkwater	37	2	35	2	1	0	0+1	0
5	DF	(Jamaica) JAM	Wes Morgan	38	2	38	2	0	0	0	0
6	DF	(Germany) GER	Robert Huth	35	3	35	3	0	0	0	0
7	MF	(England) ENG	Dean Hammond	1	0	0	0	0	0	1	0
8	MF	(England) ENG	Matty James	0	0	0	0	0	0	0	0
9	FW	(England) ENG	Jamie Vardy	38	24	36	24	0+1	0	0+1	0
10	MF	(Wales) WAL	Andy King	29	3	9+16	2	2	0	2	1
11	MF	(England) ENG	Marc Albrighton	42	2	34+4	2	0+2	0	2	0
12	GK	(England) ENG	Ben Hamer	0	0	0	0	0	0	0	0
13	DF	(Ghana) GHA	Daniel Amartey	5	0	1+4	0	0	0	0	0
14	MF	(France) FRA	N'Golo Kanté	40	1	33+4	1	1	0	1+1	0
15	MF	(Ghana) GHA	Jeffrey Schlupp	26	1	14+10	1	0	0	0+2	0
16	MF	(Wales) WAL	Tom Lawrence	0	0	0	0	0	0	0	0
17	DF	(England) ENG	Danny Simpson	32	0	30	0	1	0	1	0
18	DF	(England) ENG	Liam Moore	1	0	0	0	0	0	1	0
19	FW	(Croatia) CRO	Andrej Kramarić	5	1	0+2	0	0	0	3	1
20	FW	(Japan) JPN	Shinji Okazaki	39	6	28+8	5	0+2	1	1	0
22	MF	(England) ENG	Demarai Gray	14	0	1+11	0	2	0	0	0
23	FW	(Argentina) ARG	Leonardo Ulloa	33	6	7+22	6	2	0	2	0
24	MF	(England) ENG	Nathan Dyer	14	1	0+12	1	2	0	0	0
26	MF	(Algeria) ALG	Riyad Mahrez	39	18	36+1	17	0	0	0+2	1
27	DF	(Poland) POL	Marcin Wasilewski	9	1	3+1	0	2	1	3	0
28	DF	(Austria) AUT	Christian Fuchs	34	0	30+2	0	0	0	2	0
29	DF	(Tunisia) TUN	Yohan Benalouane	9	0	0+4	0	2	0	3	0
30	DF	(England) ENG	Ben Chilwell	3	0	0	0	2	0	1	0
32	GK	(Australia) AUS	Mark Schwarzer	3	0	0	0	0	0	3	0
33	MF	(Switzerland) SUI	Gökhan Inler	10	0	3+2	0	2	0	3	0
36	FW	(England) ENG	Joe Dodoo	4	4	0+1	0	0	0	3	4

=== Top goalscorers ===
Rank	Pos.	No.	Nat.	Player	League	FA Cup	League Cup	Total
1	FW	9	(England)	Jamie Vardy	24	0	0	24
2	MF	26	(Algeria)	Riyad Mahrez	17	0	1	18
3	FW	20	(Japan)	Shinji Okazaki	5	1	0	6
3	FW	23	(Argentina)	Leonardo Ulloa	6	0	0	6
5	FW	36	(England)	Joe Dodoo	0	0	4	4
6	DF	6	(Germany)	Robert Huth	3	0	0	3
6	MF	10	(Wales)	Andy King	2	0	1	3
8	MF	4	(England)	Danny Drinkwater	2	0	0	2
8	DF	5	(Jamaica)	Wes Morgan	2	0	0	2
8	MF	11	(England)	Marc Albrighton	2	0	0	2
11	DF	2	(Belgium)	Ritchie De Laet	1	0	0	1
11	MF	14	(France)	N'Golo Kanté	1	0	0	1
11	MF	15	(Ghana)	Jeffrey Schlupp	1	0	0	1
11	FW	19	(Croatia)	Andrej Kramarić	0	0	1	1
11	MF	24	(England)	Nathan Dyer	1	0	0	1
11	DF	27	(Poland)	Marcin Wasilewski	0	1	0	1
Own goals					1	0	0	1
Totals					68	2	7	77

=== Captains ===
- Only counts starts as captain.

Rank	No.	Position	Nat.	Player	Starts
1	5	CB	(Jamaica)	Wes Morgan	38
2	1	GK	(Denmark)	Kasper Schmeichel	2
2	10	CM	(Wales)	Andy King	2
4	7	CM	(England)	Dean Hammond	1

=== Suspensions ===
Date incurred	Nat.	Player	Matches missed	Reason
24 October 2015	(Ghana)	Jeffrey Schlupp	1	Yellow card
14 December 2015	(Germany)	Robert Huth	1	Yellow card
14 February 2016	(England)	Danny Simpson	1	(yellow card) (yellow-red card) (vs Arsenal)
17 April 2016	(England)	Jamie Vardy	2	(yellow card) (yellow-red card) (vs West Ham United)
1 May 2016	(England)	Danny Drinkwater	1	(yellow card) (yellow-red card) (vs Manchester United)

=== Season summary ===
Matches played	43 (38 Premier League, 2 FA Cup, 3 League Cup)
Matches won	25 (23 Premier League, 0 FA Cup, 2 League Cup)
Matches drawn	14 (12 Premier League, 1 FA Cup, 1 League Cup)
Matches lost	4 (3 Premier League, 1 FA Cup)
Goals scored	76 (67 Premier League, 2 FA Cup, 7 League Cup)
Goals conceded	42 (35 Premier League, 4 FA Cup, 3 League Cup)
Goal difference	+34 (+32 Premier League, −2 FA Cup, +4 League Cup)
Clean sheets	15 (15 Premier League)
Most appearances	42 ( (England) Marc Albrighton)
Most goals	24 ( (England) Jamie Vardy)
Winning percentage	Premier League: 23/38 (60.53%); Overall: 25/43 (58.14%)
