= Peter Furneaux =

English football club chairman and investor

- Born: October 12, 1935; Grimsby, Lincolnshire, England
- Died: December 2, 2014
- Occupations: Chairman, businessman.
- Board member of: Chairman of Grimsby Town F.C.

Peter Furneaux (12 October 1935 – 2 December 2014) was an English football club chairman and investor. He previously held the position of Executive Director at Grimsby Town where he was twice Chairman.

== Football ownership ==
Grimsby born Furneaux has owned shares in his home town club for over 20 years. He has been Chairman twice. In the early 1990s he was at the helm before selling out to Bill Carr. Furneaux became Chairman again in the late 1990s when he bought the majority stake hold from Doug Everitt, for an undisclosed sum.

While Furneaux was at the helm the club enjoyed much success, with Furneaux guiding them from the then Fourth Division up to the second tier of English football. He has in many respects been the club's longest serving and most successful chairman until the collapse of ITV Digital when the club faced huge difficulties.

In 2004 Furneaux relinquished his position once again, with the club's majority shareholder John Fenty taking over.

On 5 March 2011 it was announced that Furneaux would be stepping down from Grimsby's board of directors at the end of the 2010–2011 season amidst protests against himself and fellow directors Michael Chapman and John Elsom from supporters before the league tie with AFC Wimbledon. The fans had been unhappy with the trio who they had blamed for the resignation of vice-chairman Mike Parker earlier in the week. The news was broken to supporters when chairman John Fenty addressed them.

Furneaux stood down with immediate effect on 9 March 2011.

== Death ==
Furneaux died on 2 December 2014, aged 79.
