= John Cockerill (footballer) =

English footballer and manager

Personal information
- Date of birth: 12 July 1961 (age 65)
- Place of birth: Cleethorpes, England
- Position: Midfielder

Senior career*
Years	Team	Apps	(Gls)
1980	Lincoln City	0	(0)
- Boston Town
1982	Lincoln City	0	(0)
1983–1984	Grantham Town		
- King's Lynn
- Alfreton Town
- Stafford Rangers
1988–1992	Grimsby Town	107	(19)

Managerial career
- 1994: Grimsby Town (caretaker)
- 1996: Grimsby Town (caretaker)
- 2000: Grimsby Town (caretaker)
- * Club domestic league appearances and goals

John Cockerill (born 12 July 1961) is an English former professional football player and manager.

He played as a midfielder from 1980 until 1992 notably for Grimsby Town. He also played for Lincoln City, Boston Town, Grantham Town, King's Lynn, Alfreton Town and Stafford Rangers. Cockerill went on to join the coaching staff at Grimsby Town and held various positions from 1992 until 2001. He was the club's caretaker manager on three occasions.

== Playing career ==
After two abortive attempts at Lincoln City, Cockerill had a spell in the Royal Air Force and as a lorry driver, whilst continuing to play non-league football. In 1988, he was signed by Grimsby from Stafford Rangers for £21,500.

The highlight of his playing career with Grimsby, was the two goals he scored in 1991 against Exeter City in the last game of the season to secure promotion to Division Two. The end of his career came with a broken leg in 1991 against Bristol City; despite trying to regain full fitness, Cockerill never played another game.

== Coaching career ==
Cockerill remained with Grimsby Town following his retirement and spent time at the club in various positions such as the Community Coach, Youth Coach and Reserve Team Manager. In 1994 he became caretaker manager following the resignation of Alan Buckley who had joined West Bromwich Albion. Cockerill again took over temporary first team responsibilities in 1996 when Brian Laws was dismissed but was overlooked in the job with the board instead re-hiring Buckley who in turn made Cockerill his assistant. He was part of the coaching staff of the 1997–98 team who reached two Wembley Stadium finals in a matter of weeks by triumphing in the Football League Trophy and the Second Division play-off final. He became caretaker manager for a third time again in September 2000 following Buckley's dismissal and would stay on as Lennie Lawrence's assistant before leaving the club a year later with Lawrence when he too was sacked.

== Personal life ==
He is the son of Ron and brother of Glenn Cockerill, both also professional footballers.

== Honours ==
Grimsby Town

- Division Four runner-up, promoted: 1990
- Division Three third place, promoted: 1991
