= Ray Shearwood =

English football coach and performance analyst

Personal information
- Full name: Raymond Shearwood
- Place of birth: England

Team information
- Current team: Grimsby Town (first-team coach analyst)

Youth career
- Years: Team
- Preston North End

Managerial career
- Liverpool (U10’s)

Raymond "Ray" Shearwood is an English professional football coach and performance analyst who is the men's first-team coach analyst at Grimsby Town.

He previously spent almost nine years working within the Liverpool academy, holding coaching and analysis positions across several age groups before joining Steven Gerrard's coaching staff at Al-Ettifaq in the Saudi Pro League.

== Early career ==
Shearwood was a youth player and scholar with Preston North End. Following the conclusion of his time at the club, he chose to pursue a career in coaching and began working part-time within Preston's academy while studying sports science and teaching.

== Coaching career ==
=== Liverpool ===
Shearwood joined Liverpool's Academy on a part-time basis in 2014 after beginning his coaching career at Preston North End.

Initially working with Liverpool's under-15 side, he later coached across several academy age groups including the under-16s, under-14s and under-8s before becoming head coach of the club's under-10 team for two years.

In August 2019, Shearwood became Individual Coach and Analyst for Liverpool's under-15 and under-16 teams before moving into a coach and analyst role with the club's under-23 side in 2020, working alongside academy head coach Barry Lewtas.

During his time with the academy he worked with a number of players who later progressed into senior professional football, including Tyler Morton, Conor Bradley and Jarell Quansah.

=== Al-Ettifaq ===
In July 2023, Shearwood left Liverpool after almost nine years to join the coaching staff of former Liverpool captain Steven Gerrard at Saudi Pro League club Al-Ettifaq. His appointment formed part of Gerrard's first-team backroom staff, which also included Ian Foster, Tom Culshaw and Jordan Milsom. Initially appointed as Lead First Team Analyst, he later became the club's Head of Analysis, overseeing the analysis department while continuing to support first-team coaching and match preparation.

During his spell in Saudi Arabia, Shearwood completed his UEFA A Licence and began studying for an MSc in Sporting Directorship.

=== Grimsby Town ===
On 3 September 2025, Grimsby Town announced the appointment of Shearwood as the club's men's first-team coach analyst.

Speaking after his appointment, Shearwood said he was looking forward to returning to English football and believed his experiences had prepared him for the role. Head coach David Artell welcomed the appointment, describing Shearwood's blend of coaching and analytical experience as a valuable addition to the club's backroom staff.
