= Abbey Park (Grimsby) =

Football stadium in Grimsby, England

- Interactive map of Abbey Park
- Location: Grimsby, England
- Coordinates: 53.5582°N 0.0812°W
- Surface: Grass
- Record attendance: 10,000
- Field size: 114 x 75 yards

Construction
- Groundbreaking: 1887
- Built: 1887, 1888 or 1889
- Opened: 1889
- Closed: 1899
- Demolished: 1899 or 1900

Tenant
- Grimsby Town (1889–1899)

Abbey Park was a football stadium in Grimsby, Lincolnshire, England. It was the home ground of Grimsby Town between 1889 and 1899.

== History ==
Abbey Park was built as a replacement for Grimsby's previous ground, Clee Park. It consisted of a main seated stand on the northern touchline of the pitch and a raised bank on the southern touchline. Behind the eastern end of the pitch there was a 300-seat stand moved from Clee Park, alongside an 800-capacity terrace. The dressing rooms were located in the south-east corner of the ground.

The ground was opened on 30 August 1889 with a friendly match against West Brom, which Grimsby won 6–1. Grimsby became founder members of the Football League Second Division in 1892, and the first League game at Abbey Park on 3 September 1892 saw Grimsby beat Northwich Victoria 2–1 in front of 5,000 spectators.

The record attendance of 10,000 was set on 26 December 1896 for a match against Newcastle United (with Grimsby winning 3–2) and equalled for an 8 April 1897 game against Woolwich Arsenal, a game which Grimsby won 3–1. In 1899 Grimsby moved to Blundell Park; the final match at Abbey Park was played against Darwen on 15 April 1899, with the 9–2 victory also being the ground's record home win.

A housing development was later built on the site after the demolition of football stadium.
