= George Kerr (footballer) =

Scottish footballer and manager

Personal information
- Full name: George Adams McDonald Kerr
- Date of birth: 9 January 1943 (age 83)
- Place of birth: Alexandria, West Dunbartonshire, Scotland
- Position: Forward

Senior career*
Years	Team	Apps	(Gls)
1961–1965	Barnsley	166	(40)
1965–1966	Bury	15	(2)
1966–1968	Oxford United	41	(5)
1968–1973	Scunthorpe United	157	(32)
Total		379	(79)

Managerial career
- 1977: Lincoln City
- 1979–1982: Grimsby Town
- 1983–1985: Rotherham United
- 1985–1987: Lincoln City
- 1987–1990: Boston United
- * Club domestic league appearances and goals

George Adams McDonald Kerr (born 9 January 1943 in Alexandria) is a Scottish former association football player and manager. As a player, he scored 79 goals from 379 appearances in the Football League playing for Barnsley, Bury, Oxford United and Scunthorpe United. As a manager, he took charge of Lincoln City twice, Grimsby Town, Rotherham United and Boston United.

== Playing career ==
After being spotted playing for the Renton Select junior side in Scotland, Kerr joined Barnsley aged just 17. Following brief spells at Bury and Oxford United, Kerr found his home at Scunthorpe United under the guidance of manager Ron Ashman.

His then-teammate Kevin Keegan later remembered how "George was a tough, experienced Scot who knew how to handle himself."

Two months into the 1970-71 season however, Kerr suffered a serious leg break in a Lincolnshire Senior Cup match against Gainsborough Trinity. Keegan recalled: "It was a diabolical challenge. I was the nearest teammate to him and heard the crack before seeing his bone jutting out of his sock. It was horrendous, the worst thing I had ever seen on a football pitch."

Denied appearance and win bonuses for the year he was on the sidelines, Kerr was forced to rely on donated food parcels from two local butchers and a local greengrocer to feed himself and his family.

Kerr recovered from injury to take part in Scunthorpe's 1971-72 promotion season, but was forced to retire from injury in 1973, aged just 30, before joining Graham Taylor's coaching staff at Lincoln City.

== Managerial career ==
Succeeding Graham Taylor after his departure to Watford F.C., Kerr managed Lincoln City from July to December 1977. In July 1978 he became first team coach of Grimsby Town. In 1979 he became their manager and The Mariners won the Third Division championship in 1980 in Kerr's first season in charge. They finished 7th in the Second Division the following season after challenging for promotion, with the side third in the table with seven games remaining, and a return to Division One after a 33-year absence looked very much on the cards, but the club's form fell away afterwards, with them winning only one more game. That form was not maintained the following season despite a good start, and with Grimsby bottom of the league Kerr was sacked on 11 January 1982 to make way for his assistant, David Booth.

He was appointed manager of Rotherham United on 21 March 1983 but was unable to save the club from relegation to the Third Division. He remained in charge for another two years, until 8 May 1985, first avoiding relegation and then challenging for promotion, being third in November and December, before finishing mid-table. In November 1983, Rotherham knocked out first division Southampton in the League Cup. In June 1985, Kerr returned to Lincoln where despite the presence of Phil Turner and Neil Redfearn in midfield, the side was relegated to the Fourth Division. He remained in charge the following season, which began well with the Imps as high as 7th in the New Year. An inexplicable collapse in form followed and Kerr left the club in March, before Lincoln became the first club to be relegated from the Football League to the Conference. He later managed Boston United and was a scout.

== Media career ==
He is a former expert summariser on BBC Radio Humberside. He co-commentated on Grimsby Town and Scunthorpe United games for several years before eventually stepping away in 2016 due to ill health.

== Personal life ==
George's younger brother Bobby Kerr captained Sunderland to their famous 1973 FA Cup Final victory over Leeds United, whilst his elder brother Willie represented Scotland at youth level and played for Queen's Park F.C.

== Honours ==
Grimsby Town

- Football League Third Division: 1979–80
