= John Fenty =

British politician (born 1961)

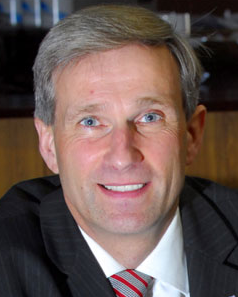

Councillor for North East Lincolnshire Council
- In office 1 May 2008 – 6 May 2021
- Ward: Humberston & New Waltham

Chairman of Grimsby Town F.C.
- In office 29 July 2004 – 4 May 2020
- Preceded by: Peter Furneaux
- Succeeded by: Philip Day (LLB)

Personal details
- Born: John Shelton Fenty; 10 December 1961 (age 64) Grimsby, Lincolnshire, England
- Party: Conservative

John Shelton Fenty (born 10 December 1961) is an English politician, businessman and former football chairman. He was the Conservative councillor for the Humberston and New Waltham ward of North East Lincolnshire Council until 2021. He is the former chairman of Grimsby Town, a position he held from 2004 until 2011, but then again in de facto terms from 2011 until 2020. He remained the clubs majority shareholder until being bought out in May 2021 and thus departing the club.

== Business career ==
At age 18 in 1980, Fenty took over a failed haulage business that his father had started. Though he made his wealth through his development from scratch, a food processing company called Five Star Fish Ltd, a company that achieved market dominance in the food service sector and won many accolades for excellence. By the time the business was sold, it employed over 280 people and was highly respected in the business. It sold in April 2004 for £20 million to the Real Good Food Company. He finally stood down as chairman at the start of 2007 and left the company in August 2007, after 27 years at the helm.

In January 2011, Fenty became the chairman and finance director of Topcon Construction Limited, having previously been a client of Topcon when it built a new cold store facility for his fish processing business at Five Star Fish.

Since April 2013, Fenty is the business mentor and commercial adviser to IT support company E-Tech Solutions based in Grimsby.

== Political career ==
In May 2008, Fenty was elected as a Conservative Party councillor for the Humberston and New Waltham ward of North East Lincolnshire Council. He was successfully re-elected in 2012 and 2016.

In December 2020, he resigned as deputy leader of North East Lincolnshire Council following links with convicted fraudster Alex May being reported in local media.

In February 2021, Fenty announced he would stand down as a NELC councillor in the May 2021 elections.

== Positions at Grimsby Town ==
=== Boardroom member ===
In the late 1990s, he was co-opted onto the board of Grimsby Town after building up £4,295 of shares in the club and another £40,000 of shares through the Five Star Fish Employee Benefit Trust. He subsequently sold all of these shares, except for £500 of his personal shares, to Michael Rouse following the collapse of ITV Digital at the end of the 2001–02 season. But, by the end of the 2002–03 season Fenty had had a change of heart and took his shareholding to £62,289 of the club equating to 26.3% of the company, buying out long term major shareholder Dudley Ramsden's interest in the club in the process.

=== Chairmanship ===
Following the sale of Five Star Fish in April 2004, Fenty became chairman of Grimsby Town on 29 July 2004 with Peter Furneaux switching roles with Fenty and becoming Vice Chairman.

Under Fenty the club seemed to be building solid foundations for the future despite a huge unpaid tax bill, in the region of £700,000, to HM Revenue and Customs relating to the seasons following the ITV digital collapse. Unfortunately the club lost in the 2006 Football League Two play-off final at the Millennium Stadium and manager Russell Slade left the club to join Yeovil Town when his contract expired at the end of May 2006. A succession of failed managerial appointments followed and Grimsby Town were eventually relegated out of the Football League for the first time in one hundred years and into the Conference National for the first time in the club's history at the end of the 2009–10 season.

Fenty is a divisive figure amongst Grimsby Town supporters. Some argue his loans and willingness to invest in further shares have kept the club from going out of business on numerous occasions whilst others argue that his poor judgement and decision making is the major contributing factor to the huge financial losses and that the decision to appoint the novice Neil Woods as manager in November 2009 ahead of Slade and the subsequent run of 20 winless league games at the start of Woods' tenure ultimately consigned Grimsby Town to relegation. Fenty complained to Ofcom following a 28 April 2007 broadcast of the BBC Radio Humberside Sports programme contained a reporter calling Fenty a "plonker". The complaint was not upheld though as the station had issued two apologies in the following 7sevendays. Ofcom considered that the complaint had, in effect, been resolved by the BBC, and therefore found in the context of the subsequent broadcasts no unfairness resulted to Fenty.

On 23 February 2011, Grimsby Town relieved Woods of his duties. On 7 March 2011, after using an unnamed agent to make a direct approach, Fenty interviewed Boston United joint managers Rob Scott and Paul Hurst despite the pair being under contract and not having the permission of Boston to speak to the pair. On 21 March 2011 Scott and Hurst resigned as Boston managers and were appointed Grimsby Town joint managers 48 hours later. A lengthy dispute for compensation between the two clubs followed. The case was heard on 16 March 2012 with the court recorder finding in favour of Boston United. In his finding he said that Fenty had "acted recklessly" in his dealings with the said agent by relying on his word with regards to Scott and Hurst's breach of contract.

On 19 September 2011, Fenty resigned as chairman of Grimsby Town with immediate effect. He remained the club's chief spokesperson and continued as de facto chairman until Philip Day was officially appointed to the role in May 2020. Fenty remains the largest-holding executive director, owning 42.86% of the club's shares. Grimsby Town Football Club plc is considered to be controlled by Fenty "by reason of his shareholdings and financial commitment".

=== Majority shareholder ===
On 29 December 2019, Fenty appointed Ian Holloway as first team manager, with Holloway reportedly investing £100,000 in order to become a member of the board at the same time. By February, Fenty decided to take a step back to give Holloway more freedom and control over the running of the club both on and off the field. On 12 December 2020. the Grimsby Telegraph reported that Manchester-based convicted fraudster Alex May had been a guest at Grimsby's home game against Mansfield Town with May looking to invest £1 million. It was announced the May's investment would be used to fund the cost of a new training facility, but following a backlash from supporters the club eventually decided to reject May's offer. It was announced that both Fenty and May had been business partners having set up a Manchester-based business called 'Town Centre Living Limited', with Fenty assuming control of the company when May chose to resign as a Director in April 2020, announcing however that he planned to dissolve the company. The scandal led to Fenty's resignation from his position on the cabinet of North East Lincolnshire council.

On 16 December 2020, a consortium led by London-based businessman Tom Shutes met with chairman Phillip Day with the view of buying the club via the purchase of Fenty's shares. This led to Ian Holloway publicly hitting out at Fenty and potential investors, whilst re-affirming his position as the club's manager saying that he stands with the fans but was finding it increasingly hard to do his job. He also stood down from his director duties to concentrate on his position as manager and would be using social media more often to communicate with supporters, also claiming he would not be going anywhere unless told so. On the morning of 23 December 2020, Holloway resigned as manager releasing a statement using his Twitter account. His reason for departing was his displeasure at Fenty's decision to sell his shares in the club, despite criticising him recently Holloway claimed he did not want to carry on at the club without the people he came here to work with. Holloway also stated that a key factor in his departure was that the potential consortium interested in buying the club had reached out to him and contacted him several times and he found this to be inappropriate; although a statement later released by the potential investment group denied that any of them had ever had any contact with Holloway. Later that day Fenty officially rejected a potential takeover over bid from the consortium. It was also announced that Holloway had not yet invested any money into the club and has potential investment in the club would have only gone ahead upon the sale of his house in Bristol.

Soccer AM presenter and Grimsby fan Lloyd Griffith wrote in his column for fan site "Cod Almighty" on 24 December 2020, that having become friends with many Grimsby players over the years that some of the clubs top performing players, in particular Padraig Amond and Charles Vernam had told him they had only left the club because Fenty had offered them poor or reduced contracts that had forced them to look elsewhere despite being happy at the club. The rejection of the takeover prompted an angry response from Grimsby supporters who called for his resignation after "years of failure and misery for fans" with fans describing his position at the club as "untenable". Banners and flags with the words "Fenty Out" began appearing all over Grimsby and Cleethorpes as pressure began to mount on Fenty with a supporter poll resulting in a 95% win in support of a takeover from the Shutes consortium, with the news that fans were beginning to boycott the club until Fenty agreed to sell his shares.

On 29 December 2020, Fenty agreed to sell his shares to the consortium of Tom Shutes, Jason Stockwood and Andrew Petitt. On 29 April 2021 Grimsby suffered relegation back to Non-League for only the second time in their history. Club legend and record appearance holder John McDermott laid the blame on Fenty saying he felt sad and angry. He added “You can’t blame Paul (Hurst), and you can’t blame the players now. Watching the games, they’ve had a go, but he’s been given a gun with about two bullets in it. How can you fight that? I’m angry in a way because it’s not from the players’ point of view, it’s been from the top, and we all know where, but people in there have allowed him to do it, so they’re just as much to blame as he is.”

On 5 May 2021, Fenty officially left the club having been bought out by Jason Stockwood and Andrew Pettit, two of the original Shutes consortium members.
