= Grimsby Town F.C. =

Association football club in Cleethorpes, England

- Full name: Grimsby Town Football Club
- Nickname: The Mariners
- Founded: 1878; 148 years ago
- Ground: Blundell Park
- Capacity: 9,546
- Coordinates: 53°34′12″N 0°2′47″W
- Owner(s): 1878 Partners (63.1%); The Mariners Trust (13.5%); Mike Parker (10.5%); Other Shareholders (12.9%)
- Chairman: Andrew Pettit
- Head coach: David Artell
- League: EFL League Two
- 2025–26: EFL League Two, 7th of 24
- Website: gtfc.co.uk
Home colours	Away colours	Third colours

Grimsby Town Football Club is a professional association football club based in Cleethorpes, North East Lincolnshire, England, that competes in EFL League Two, the fourth level of the English football league system.

Nicknamed "the Mariners", the club was founded as Grimsby Pelham Football Club in 1878, changed its name to Grimsby Town a year later, and moved to its current stadium, Blundell Park, in 1898. Grimsby Town is the most successful team of the three professional clubs in historic Lincolnshire, being the only one to play top-flight English football. It is also the only club of the three to reach an FA Cup semi-final (doing so on two occasions, both times during the 1930s). It has also spent more time in the English game's first and second tiers than any other club from Lincolnshire. Notable former managers include Bill Shankly, who went on to guide Liverpool to three League titles, two FA Cups and a UEFA Cup triumph, and Lawrie McMenemy who, after securing promotion to the then Third Division in 1972, moved to Southampton where he won the FA Cup in 1976. Alan Buckley is the club's most successful manager; he had three spells between 1988 and 2008, guiding the club to three promotions and two appearances at Wembley Stadium during the 1997–98 season, winning both the Football League Trophy and the Football League Second Division play-off Final. In 2008, Buckley took Grimsby to the capital again, but lost out to MK Dons in the final of the Football League Trophy. The Mariners had also reached the Football League Two play-off Final in 2006 at the Millennium Stadium in Cardiff, but lost the match 1–0 to Cheltenham Town. Later trips to Wembley in 2013 and 2016 saw them defeated in the FA Trophy final by Wrexham and FC Halifax Town respectively, having also lost at the venue in the 2015 National League play-off final to Bristol Rovers before finally gaining promotion by winning the 2016 final against Forest Green Rovers. Grimsby were again relegated out of the Football League in 2021, but secured an immediate promotion at the first attempt with victory over Solihull Moors in the 2022 National League play-off final at the London Stadium. In 2022–23, Grimsby Town became the first team in FA Cup history to defeat five teams from higher divisions following a 2–1 win at Premier League side Southampton to advance to the quarter-finals, before eventually losing to Brighton & Hove Albion.

Grimsby Town's relegation in 2010 made them the sixth club to compete in all top five divisions of English football (after Wimbledon, Wigan Athletic, Carlisle United, Oxford United and Luton Town, and before Leyton Orient, Notts County and Oldham Athletic). Grimsby's 1939 FA Cup semi-final attendance of 76,962 versus Wolverhampton Wanderers is still a record at Manchester United's Old Trafford stadium. In 1954 they became the first English club to appoint a foreign manager, Hungarian Elemér Berkessy. The club's record appearance holder is John McDermott, who made 754 appearances between 1987 and 2007, while their leading scorer is Pat Glover, with 180 goals (1930–39).

== History ==
=== Early years (1878–1918) ===
A chart showing the table positions of Grimsby Town in the English football league system from joining as Grimsby Pelham in 1892–93 to the present

Grimsby Town was formed in 1878 after a meeting held at the Wellington Arms public house in Freeman Street, Grimsby. Several attendees included members of the local Worsley Cricket Club who wanted to form a football club to occupy the empty winter evenings after the cricket season had finished.

The club was originally called Grimsby Pelham, this being the family name of the Earl of Yarborough, a significant landowner in the area. In 1880 the club purchased land at Clee Park which was to become their ground until 1889 when they relocated to Abbey Park, before moving again in 1899 to their present home, Blundell Park. The original colours were blue and white hoops, which were changed to chocolate brown and blue quartered shirts in 1884.

In 1888 the club first played league football, joining the newly formed 'Combination'. The league soon collapsed and the following year the club applied to join the Football League, an application that was refused. Instead the club joined the Football Alliance. In 1890 the club became a limited company and in 1892 finally entered the Football League, when it was expanded to two divisions. The first game was a 2–1 victory over Northwich Victoria.

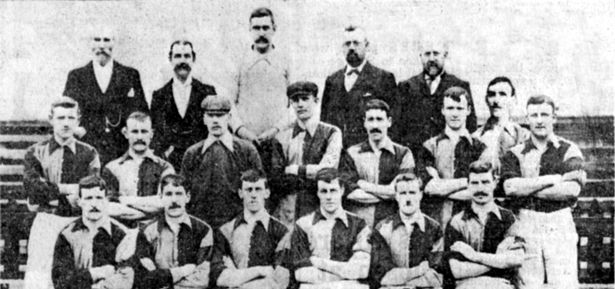
Grimsby Town F.C., champions of the inaugural Football League Second Division in 1900–1901

The 1901–02 season saw promotion to the First Division, having finished as champions; two seasons later they were relegated and within a decade they would be a non-League side again, failing re-election in 1910 and falling to the Midland League. However, they finished as champions at the first attempt and at the subsequent re-election vote, replaced local rivals Lincoln City in the Football League.

Grimsby Town and Hull City were the only two professional teams which had official permission to play league football on Christmas Day because of the demands of the fish trade, but that tradition has now disappeared following the dramatic reduction of their trawler fleets in recent years.

=== Inter-War years (1918–1945) ===
This was the most successful period in the club's history. The first full season after World War I the club were relegated to the new Third Division; in the initial 1920–21 season they played against the former members of the Southern League who had been invited to form the new division, but after a year an equivalent Third Division North was created and Grimsby moved across to that. By 1929 they were back in Division One, where they stayed (with a brief break from 1932 to 1934) until 1939, obtaining their highest-ever league position, 5th in Division One, in the 1934–35 season. In 1925 they adopted the black and white stripes as their colours.

Three Grimsby Town players, forward Jackie Bestall, goalkeeper George Tweedy and defender Harry Betmead each received a solitary England cap during the period 1935–1937. They remain the only players from the club to have received full England honours.

Grimsby reached the semi-final of the FA Cup in 1936, the game was played at Huddersfield Town's Leeds Road, but lost 1–0 to Arsenal, with the goal coming from Cliff Bastin five minutes before half time.

On 20 February 1937, the club's record attendance of 31,651 was recorded when the club met Wolverhampton Wanderers in the FA Cup.

Grimsby also reached the semi-final of the FA Cup on 25 March 1939, Grimsby played Wolverhampton Wanderers, in a FA Cup semi-final at Old Trafford. The attendance of 76,962 remains Old Trafford's largest ever attendance. The Mariners lost the game 5–0 after goalkeeper George Moulson was injured early in the match. With the rules forbidding substitutes for injuries, Grimsby had to play with 10 men and an outfield player in goal.

=== Post-war decline (1946–1970) ===
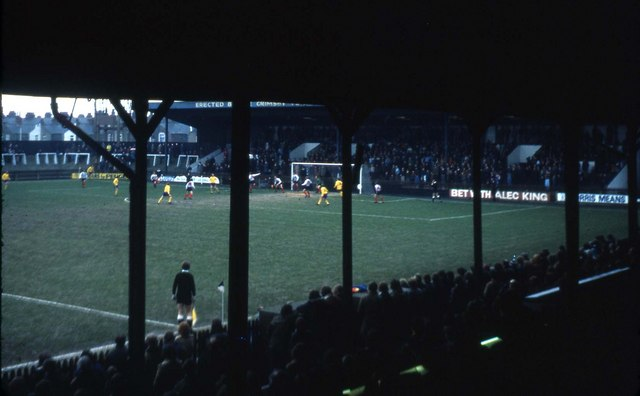
A Grimsby Town game in 1977

With the resumption of the Football League for the 1946–47 season after World War II the club was relegated at the end of the 1947–48 season and has never returned to the highest level. Much of the 1950s and 1960s were spent alternating between the Second Division and the Third Division North, later the Third Division. From July 1951 to January 1953 they were managed by Bill Shankly. His main problems were that Grimsby had been relegated twice in recent seasons, dropping from the First to the Third Division, and some good players had been transferred before he arrived. Shankly believed he still had good players to work with and was able to buy some additional players on the transfer market for low fees.

Grimsby made a strong challenge for promotion in 1951–52 but finished second, three points behind Lincoln City (only one team was promoted from Division Three North, with one from Division Three South).

"Pound for pound, and class for class, the best football team I have seen in England since the war. In the league, they were in they played football nobody else could play. Everything was measured, planned and perfected and you could not wish to see more entertaining football".

— Bill Shankly, in his autobiography in 1976.

Grimsby's aging team made a bright start in 1952–53 with five straight wins but eventually slipped and finished in 5th place. In 1953–54, Shankly became disillusioned when the board could not give him money to buy new players. He was reluctant to promote some promising reserves because of loyalty to the older players (a fault that was to resurface at Liverpool years later) and he finally resigned in January 1954, citing the board's lack of ambition as his main reason. Shankly's record in league football at Grimsby was 62 wins and 35 defeats from 118 matches. Shankly went on to win the Football League, FA Cup and UEFA Cup with Liverpool.

Grimsby became the first English football club to appoint a foreign manager with the appointment of Hungarian Elemér Berkessy in 1954. The appointment did not work out, and with the club in danger of having to apply for re-election, Allenby Chilton joined from Manchester United as the club's first player-manager. While Chilton was unable to stop Grimsby from finishing 23rd, they were comfortably re-elected with 49 votes, and the following season, Chilton led the club to the Third Division North title. Chilton continued as manager at Grimsby Town until April 1959 when he joined Wigan Athletic.

In 1968, Grimsby slipped into the Fourth Division for the first time. The following season, the club once more had to apply for re-election to the league, having finished second from bottom. It was in this season that the lowest-ever attendance for a Football League match at Blundell Park was ever recorded; 1,833 saw a 2–0 defeat to Brentford. Arthur Drewry, a local businessman, married the daughter of Grimsby Town's chairman, and subsequently served as a director of the club before his own chairmanship. Drewry became President of the Football League and Chairman of the Football Association after Grimsby, before he was elected as the 5th president of FIFA.

=== Revival of the 1970s (1970–1980) ===
Grimsby Town Badge (1977–2022)

Grimsby Town broke their transfer record in 1972 with a fee of £20,000 for the signing of Phil Hubbard. In the same year 22,489 people witnessed a home victory against Exeter City that saw the club promoted as Division Four Champions. This turnaround was credited to the appointment of Lawrie McMenemy as manager.

The club stayed in Division Three until relegation in 1977 but were promoted again in 1979. A year later they finished as Third Division Champions under the stewardship of George Kerr and returned to the second tier of the English game, a level they had not been at for 16 years.

A popular myth has it that in 1976 the local Member of Parliament and then Foreign Secretary Anthony Crosland invited the then United States Secretary of State Henry Kissinger to watch the Mariners play Gillingham. Despite this being widely reported in the media, with some outlets claiming Kissinger subsequently became a Grimsby fan, in reality Kissinger's Boeing 747 simply stopped off for a two-hour breakfast discussion with Crosland on the issue of Rhodesia at nearby RAF Waddington before flying directly to Nairobi. However, Crosland's decision to force the US foreign policy leader to fly from London to Lincolnshire for their Saturday morning meeting was influenced by his desire to stay in his constituency and watch his local football team.

=== Return to the Second Division (1980–1987) ===
The first season back (1980–81) saw the club finish 7th. Work started that year on a new £1 million stand, originally called the Findus Stand (now known as the Young's Stand) after the former Barrett's Stand had been declared unsafe, the stand opened for the first time on 29 August 1982, as the Mariners played hosts to Leeds United. In the 1983–84 season the club finished 5th in the Second Division after spending most of the latter part of the campaign in the top three promotion places. This was their highest league finish since the 1947–48 season. Grimsby Town's stay in the Second Division ended in 1987, having spent much of the 1986–87 season in the top half of the table, but a run of 8 losses and 2 draws in the final 10 games saw them fall from 8th to 21st before they could return to second tier again.

=== Initial decline and double promotion (1987–1997) ===
1987–88 saw Grimsby Town suffer a second consecutive relegation, placing them in the Fourth Division. The club's financial situation was also dismal, and as the 1988–89 season began, the task at Grimsby was to avoid relegation to the Football Conference, avoid expulsion from the FA and avoid going out of business completely. This was achieved, finishing 9th. Following the resignation of Dave Booth in 1986 (to pursue outside business interests) the club had two managers in two years (Mick Lyons and Bobby Roberts). Alan Buckley was appointed after the 1988 relegation and by 1991 had led the club to two successive promotions with the chairman at that time being Peter Furneaux. Grimsby were to remain in football's second flight for six years. Buckley's crop of players consisting of some of the most popular and biggest cult heroes in the club's history; players such as Shaun Cunnington, Keith Alexander, Mark Lever, Dave Gilbert, Steve Livingstone, Paul Futcher, Paul Groves and Clive Mendonca made the club a solid second-tier side (the Second Division became Division One in 1992 upon the creation of the Premier League from the old First Division). In 1992–93, Grimsby finished 9th in the new Division One, and until well into April they were in the hunt for a play-off place that would have given them the chance of a third promotion in four years. They dipped to 16th place a year later, though they were never in any real danger of relegation.

The Mariners began to produce homegrown talent from the club's youth academy, including Jack Lester, John Oster, Gary Croft and Peter Handyside. Buckley departed Grimsby in October 1994 to join West Bromwich Albion and he was replaced by defender Brian Laws. Laws steered Grimsby to a 10th-place finish in his first season as manager. During his tenure, Laws became famous for a changing-room altercation after a defeat at Luton with Italian striker Ivano Bonetti, which left the latter with a fractured cheekbone, and caused the popular player to leave the club at the end of the season. Grimsby finished 17th and were in the battle to avoid relegation right up to the penultimate game of the season. In the 1996–97 season the Mariners were relegated from Division One. Despite flowing goals from Clive Mendonca, notably good performances from John Oster and newcomer Kingsley Black, Grimsby failed to save themselves. The club had suffered from the losses of Gary Croft, who made a £1.7 million move to Blackburn Rovers and ever present goalkeeper Paul Crichton.

=== Double Wembley season (1997–98) ===

Subs:

- (Northern Ireland) Black
- (England) Jobling
- (England) Livingstone

1998 Football League Trophy Final starting line-up at Wembley Stadium

The 1997–98 season saw the return of Alan Buckley as manager, after an unsuccessful period at West Bromwich Albion, for Grimsby Town's most successful post-war season. In the summer of 1997, Buckley succeeded in bringing in players to the club who were to be instrumental in the club's upcoming season; former skipper Paul Groves was re-signed from West Bromwich Albion, and Kevin Donovan and David Smith also joined the club from Albion. The mid-season capture of Huddersfield Town midfielder Wayne Burnett proved to be a great bit of business for Buckley. After a seemingly poor start to the League campaign, performances improved, which propelled the club into a promotion battle with Watford, Bristol City and an expensively assembled Fulham (at the time the only club at this level to have spent seven-figure sums on players), with Grimsby finishing the season in 3rd place.

A good run in the League Cup saw the Mariners knock holders Leicester City and fellow Premier League side Sheffield Wednesday out of the competition before finally losing out to Liverpool. A decent run of form had ignited the careers of such younger players as Daryl Clare, Danny Butterfield and Jack Lester who were becoming an integral part of the Blundell Park set-up. The Mariners went on to dump Burnley out of the Football League Trophy Northern section area final, which would see the club book its first trip to Wembley Stadium. The club were drawn against Southern section champions AFC Bournemouth and in a tight game, an equaliser from substitute Kingsley Black took the game into extra time, and in the 112th minute Grimsby secured the game courtesy of a golden goal from Wayne Burnett. This was the first major trophy awarded to the club following its first appearance at Wembley. It took only four weeks for Grimsby to return to the stadium though, this time to face Northampton Town in the Division Two play-off Final. Town won the game 1–0 thanks to a first half Kevin Donovan goal which gave the club a historic Wembley double and the Mariners promotion back to Division One.

=== Return to the second tier (1998–2003) ===
The 1998–99 season saw Grimsby Town finish in 11th place, but the 1999–2000 season saw Grimsby struggle and finish 20th, avoiding relegation at the expense of Buckley's old club Walsall. The 2000–01 season saw a boardroom change with Doug Everitt taking over from Bill Carr. Everitt dismissed manager Alan Buckley just two games into the season, replacing him with Lennie Lawrence, who earlier in his managerial career had guided both Charlton Athletic and Middlesbrough into the top flight. The new manager chopped and changed the playing squad around and brought in some expensive loan signings from abroad such as Zhang Enhua, Menno Willems signing from Vitesse for 160K, David Nielsen and Knut Anders Fostervold. Despite this, the club struggled to avoid relegation, only securing their place in Division One on the last day of the season with a win over promoted Fulham.

The Mariners started the 2001–02 season strongly, topping the league table after five games. The club advanced to the third round of the League Cup where they met holders Liverpool at Anfield. In one of the club most famous victories, Grimsby held the Premier League team to a 0–0 draw after 90 minutes taking the game into extra time. Despite Gary McAllister scoring a penalty following a David Beharall handball to put the Reds 1–0 up, loan signing Marlon Broomes equalised before ex-Everton youth player Phil Jevons hit a 35-yard strike into the top corner of Chris Kirkland's goal to give the club a historic victory. Grimsby's push for promotion faltered and the team's form declined rapidly, with Lawrence being dismissed halfway into the season. Paul Groves, the skipper, was chosen to replace him and he steered them to a 19th in the final table, enough to avoid relegation, but a disappointing end to a season which had begun so promisingly. The season was overshadowed by the collapse of ITV Digital putting enormous strain on finances for the club.

The 2002–03 season would bring relegation with the Mariners finishing bottom of Division One and relegated after five successive seasons at this level. At the time only one of their previous 12 seasons had been spent below the second tier of English football.

=== Sliding down the divisions (2004–2010) ===
The sudden collapse of ITV Digital had left the club with debts of over £2 million, £700,000 of which was owed to the Inland Revenue and a further substantial amount to their bankers, Lloyds Bank. The collapse had seen a lot of the smaller clubs playing in the second tier of English football struggle to make ends meet. Coupled with this, it meant first-team players such as Danny Coyne and Georges Santos moved on to other clubs. For the new season, the club also had to supply its own kits following the closure of long serving kit suppliers Avec Sportswear. Grimsby Town played the season using the brand "Grimsby Town Sports".

Groves was dismissed in February 2004 following a poor stretch of games that had seen the club drop down the table, his replacement Nicky Law was sacked himself only a few months later as Grimsby were relegated for a second consecutive season. Russell Slade was appointed as the new manager in May 2004.

In 2005, director John Fenty became the controlling shareholder in the club after a search for outside investors failed, and a sale of shares to the local public was poorly received. He owned a 51% majority stake in the club and had made significant loans to the club to ensure its continued operation. Former Leicester City chairman John Elsom also joined the board of directors along with racehorse stable trainer and owner Michael Chapman in December 2002.

Having guided Grimsby to a mid table finish in his first season, Russell Slade began the 2005–06 season with a good start to the season and much improved results and performances had seen Grimsby Town rise to the top of Football League Two. A good run in the League Cup saw Town beat Derby County away at Pride Park in round one, and defeat Premier League side Tottenham Hotspur at home in the second round, with Jean-Paul Kamudimba Kalala hitting an 87th-minute winner. The Mariners eventually suffered elimination by Newcastle United in the third round, losing 1–0 at home. Grimsby would fall out of the promotion places on the final day of the season and after defeating Lincoln City in the play-off semi-finals they would lose 1–0 to Cheltenham Town in the final at the Millennium Stadium. On 31 May, manager Russell Slade left the club after failing to agree terms on a new contract.

Slade's assistant Graham Rodger was his replacement but by November he had been dismissed following a poor start to the season, he was replaced by Alan Buckley who arrived back with The Mariners for a third time but could only produce a bottom half finish in League Two. During the 2007–08 season the club enjoyed a good run in the Football League Trophy and on 4 March 2008 Grimsby booked their place at the new Wembley Stadium after beating Morecambe in a two-legged Northern Final. A Paul Bolland goal in the away first leg was enough to see Town through. They went on to play MK Dons in the Final on 30 March, losing 2–0 after Danny Boshell missed an early penalty. The season ended with eight straight defeats. After a 13–game winless streak in the league stretching from 22 March 2008, on 15 September 2008 Alan Buckley was sacked as manager for a second time. The board appointed Mike Newell as manager. The Mariners would finish 22nd in League Two narrowly avoiding relegation on the final day.

Following another slow start to the season, and despite previous backings from the Grimsby Town board, on 18 October 2009 the club's official website declared they had sacked Mike Newell due to "irretrievable breakdown". Neil Woods was controversially made permanent manager on 23 November 2009. The other main candidate for the job was former boss Russell Slade, but the board decided upon Woods ahead of Slade. Almost immediately Woods was dealt a blow when the club decided to do a U-turn and sell captain Ryan Bennett to Peterborough United for £500,000 despite rejecting this offer in the summer and the player only recently signing a new four-year deal. Grimsby under Woods struggled and despite winning four and drawing one of their last six games to give them a chance of league survival going into the last game of the season, they were defeated 3–0 by Burton Albion, and thus were relegated from the Football League for the first time in nearly 100 years.

=== Non-League (2010–2016) ===
Neil Woods was relieved of his duties on 24 February 2011 after 15 months in charge, leaving the club in 9th position in the Conference National. On 23 March 2011, former Boston United managerial duo of Rob Scott and Paul Hurst were announced as the new joint managers. They finished the 2010–11 season in 11th on 62 points. On 19 September 2011, John Fenty resigned as chairman of Grimsby Town with immediate effect, a position he had held for 7 years.

Following an 11th-place finish in 2012, the Mariners enjoyed a positive cup run in the 2012–13 season FA Trophy and reached the final at Wembley Stadium where they played Wrexham on 24 March 2013. Grimsby went ahead in the second half with 20 minutes left to go, through an Andy Cook strike. However, they conceded a penalty with 9 minutes left and Wrexham equalised. This took the game to extra time, and then penalties, where Grimsby lost the shoot-out 4–1. Grimsby finished the season in good form, with a 9-match unbeaten run, finishing the season with a 3–0 win against Newport County. This led them to finish in 4th place with 83 points. They faced Newport County again straight away in the play-off semi-finals, where they were knocked out by a 1–0 loss in both legs. The managerial duo was broken up on 6 September 2013 due to Rob Scott being suspended and Paul Hurst was placed in sole charge of the team.

Grimsby came third in the Conference Premier 2014–15 season, and secured a play-off spot. Grimsby reached the 2015 Conference Premier play-off final against Bristol Rovers in front of a conference record 47,029 crowd at Wembley Stadium. The game was forced to penalties where Jon-Paul Pittman missed the penultimate penalty in their 5–3 shootout.

Grimsby would play in the final of the FA Trophy, but lost 1–0 to FC Halifax Town. The week before, Grimsby Town beat Forest Green Rovers 3–1 in the 2016 National League play-off final at Wembley Stadium, seeing Grimsby promoted back to League Two after a six-year absence from the Football League.

=== Return to the Football League (2016–2021) ===
After promotion, manager, Paul Hurst, released a number of players, many of whom were pivotal to the previous season's promotion push. On 24 October 2016, Paul Hurst was appointed as Shrewsbury Town manager, Chris Doig also left Grimsby and made Hurst's assistant at Shrewsbury, thus leaving Dave Moore and Stuart Watkiss as caretaker managers. On 7 November 2016, Marcus Bignot, then manager of non-League side, Solihull Moors, was officially announced as the new Grimsby Town manager, along with the appointment of Micky Moore as his assistant. On 10 April 2017, Marcus Bignot was sacked. His replacement was Russell Slade, who joined the club for the second time as manager on 12 April 2017. The Mariners would finish 14th, with a total of 62 points.

Slade was sacked on 11 February 2018 after the team failed to win in 12 league games, with eight losses; he left the team 17th in League Two. Paul Wilkinson took over as caretaker manager following the sacking. Michael Jolley was appointed as the new manager on 2 March 2018 and twice secured Grimsby's Football League status as well as securing cup runs that culminated in an FA Cup tie away at Crystal Palace and a League Cup tie at Chelsea. Jolley left the club by mutual agreement and was replaced on a temporary basis by assistant manager Anthony Limbrick.

On 29 December 2019, Ian Holloway joined Grimsby Town as manager, at the same time becoming a shareholder in the club. On 23 December 2020, just under one year later, Holloway left the club abruptly in controversial circumstances, announcing on Twitter that he was resigning with immediate effect. His decision was down to several boardroom issues, a big loss in form and his unwillingness to work with a consortium looking to buy out John Fenty. Ben Davies was caretaker manager for two games.

On 30 December 2020, Paul Hurst was re-appointed as permanent manager, but could not prevent the club from being relegated back to the National League following a 3–2 defeat to Exeter City, after a five-year stay in the Football League.

=== Climbing to the Football League again & New takeover (2021–) ===

The Grimsby team that played in the three successful play-off matches against Notts County, Wrexham and Solihull Moors

On 5 May 2021, local businessmen Jason Stockwood and Andrew Pettit under their company 1878 Partners completed their takeover of the football club after buying out majority shareholder John Fenty.

In the 2021–22 season, Grimsby finished 6th in the National League. They defeated Notts County, in the quarter-final of the play-offs 2–1, and Wrexham in the semi-final 5–4. In the 2022 National League play-off final, they defeated Solihull Moors 2–1 after extra time to win promotion back to League Two at the London Stadium.

On 1 March 2023, Grimsby advanced to the quarter-finals of the FA Cup for the first time since 1939 by beating Premier League side Southampton 2–1 away from home, becoming the first club in the competition's history to knock out five teams from a higher division.

On 27 August 2025, Grimsby eliminated Manchester United in the second round of the EFL Cup, winning 12–11 on penalties following a 2–2 draw at Blundell Park in one of the biggest cup upsets of all time. They followed that up with a 1–0 away win over Championship side Sheffield Wednesday on 16 September 2025, before losing 5–0 at Blundell Park to Brentford in the fourth round on 28 October.

On 25 April 2026, after a 4–0 against Swindon Town, Grimsby earnt a place in the League Two play-offs for the first time since their last appearance in 2006.

== Colours and strip ==
Grimsby Town's traditional home kit

The original 1878 kit of Grimsby Pelham, featured a shirt with narrow horizontal stripes in royal blue and white, with long white shorts and black socks. Between 1884 and 1910, various kit colours were introduced, with the most common colours being variations of pale blue and chocolate brown, worn with white shorts and black socks. Other kits from this period include:

- 1897–1898 – Plain white shirt, with royal blue shorts and socks
- 1904–1906 – Pale red shirt, with black shorts and socks
- 1906–1908 – White shirt with red collar and cuffs, red shorts, black socks with red bands

Black and white vertical stripes were adopted in 1910 and with a few exceptions, they have rarely been missing from the kit design ever since and have become one of the most recognisable features of the club. The 1911 kit included the black and white striped t-shirt, white shorts and black socks. Exceptions from the traditional bar-stripe kit:

- 1935–1936 – Plain white shirt featuring the coat of arms of the County Borough of Great Grimsby, black shorts and red socks
- 1958–1959 – White shirt with black pin stripes, black shorts, red socks
- 1960–1962 – White shirt with black collar and cuffs, red shorts, red socks
- 1963–1966 – White shirt with black pin stripes, black shorts with white stripe, white socks with black bands
- 2006–2007 – Black and white halves, black shorts, black socks

Since the introduction of the black and white bar stripes in 1910, the GTFC kits have featured exclusively red, black and white. The only exceptions to this are the corporate colours used in a sponsor logo and the yellow/gold trim used between 2001 and 2003. The official GTFC club logo first appeared on the club kit in 1974.

Grimsby Town announced for their game on 26 February 2023, that they would wear a special one-off shirt that promotes green energy, with the sponsor being labelled "Europe's Green Town" in nod towards the "Food Town" sponsorship of the 1990s.

Kit suppliers
Dates	Supplier
1975–1976	(United Kingdom) Litesome
1976–1978	(United Kingdom) Bukta
1978–1981	(United Kingdom) Admiral
1981–1983	(Germany) Adidas
1983–1986	(United Kingdom) Hobott
1986–1987	(United Kingdom) En-s
1987–1993	(United Kingdom) Ribero
1993–1994	(United Kingdom) Admiral
1994–1996	(Italy) Diadora
1996–1998	(Italy) Lotto
1998–2003	(United Kingdom) Avec
2003–2004	(United Kingdom) GTS (own brand)
2004–2008	(United States) Nike
2008–2021	(Italy) Errea
2021–2024	(Italy) Macron
2024–2026	(United Kingdom) Umbro
2026–	(Italy) Lotto

Shirt sponsors
Dates	Sponsor	Sponsor Business Category
1979–1984	(Sweden) Findus	Frozen food
1984–1986	(United Kingdom) Nisa	Retail convenience stores
1986–1987	(United Kingdom) Bluecrest	Frozen food
1987–1993	(Switzerland) Ciba-Geigy	Pharmaceuticals
1993–1995	(Switzerland) Ciba	Pharmaceuticals
1995–1998	(United Kingdom) Europe's Food Town	Frozen food
1998–2003	(United Kingdom) Dixon Motors	Vehicle retailer
2003–2004	(United Kingdom) Jarvis	Rail freight
2004–2022	(United Kingdom) Young's	Frozen food
2022–2026	(United Kingdom) myenergi	Renewable energy
26 February 2023	(United Kingdom) Europe's Green Town	None (Special one-off shirt promoting green energy)
2026–	(United Kingdom) Blackrow Group	Engineering services

== Stadium ==
Dates	Ground
1878–1879	Clee Park
1879–1880	Lovett Street
1880–1889	Clee Park
1889–1899	Abbey Park
1899–present	Blundell Park

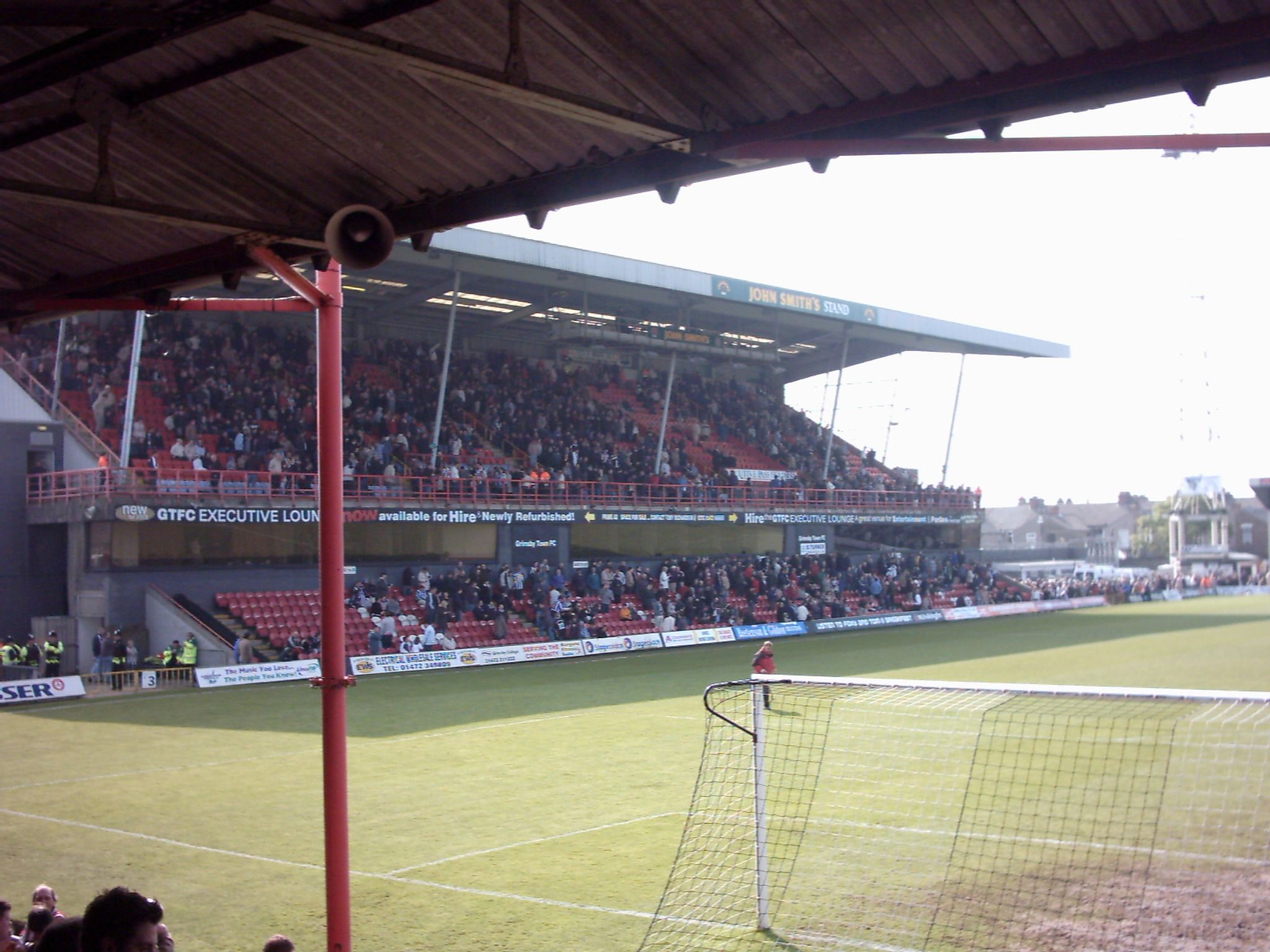
The Findus Stand (formerly the Carlsberg Stand)

Grimsby Town play their home games at Blundell Park in Cleethorpes. This is the club's fourth stadium. They originally played at Clee Park until 1879, they then moved to Lovett Street for a single season, before returning to Clee Park for a further nine years. The Mariners then moved to Abbey Park until 1899 before a move to Blundell Park, the club's current stadium.

In 1953 the club introduced its first floodlights to the ground and with that enabling Grimsby Town to play night-time fixtures. Tall floodlights were purchased second hand from Wolverhampton Wanderers in 1958 and installed in 1960 at a cost of £9,000 which was raised by the supporters club, they have illuminated matches ever since when required. However, in 2019, these original lights were replaced with newer, brighter lights. Three of the four original pylons remain. The stadium has had an all-seated capacity of just 8,777 in recent years, being in and around 27,000 before the stadium was made all seated in 1995. The club's demise from the second tier of English football, down to the fourth meant the expansion seating was removed. This brought the overall capacity down from around 12,000 to what it is today. Situated inside the Findus Stand at Blundell Park is "McMenemy's Function Suite", named after former manager Lawrie McMenemy.

Since the late 1990s, there have been plans for a new 20,200-seat stadium at nearby Great Coates – tentatively titled the Conoco Stadium after a naming rights deal with the American energy corporation ConocoPhillips. There have been numerous delays to the development of the new stadium. The plans have been met with resistance from many residents of the local area surrounding the proposed stadium site, but other factors have also slowed progress. One of the most notable difficulties for the club was in demonstrating how it planned to finance the scheme. As a result, they later amended their proposal to include a retail park on the site, which would help to fund the development. This raised other problems, due to a rival proposal by the property developer Henry Boot, who are continuing with plans for their own retail park, which will be in direct competition with the Grimsby Town site and which has also been approved by the local council. Henry Boot attempted to have the football team's development plan stopped, by asking for it to be sent for judicial review by the Government, however their attempt failed. Currently, the Grimsby Town stadium development proposal has satisfied all the conditions that were imposed by planning officials and consent for the project has been granted. Initial estimates had suggested that the club would be able to move to the new stadium for the start of the 2011–12 season. However, as a result of the ongoing global recession, the club has halted all progress on the new development and it is unlikely that any work will begin until an upturn in the economy.

As of the 2012–13 season, the GTFC Supporters Trust known as the 'Mariners Trust' has taken over responsibility for the operation of most of the bars at the stadium, which hopefully will lead to refurbishment, and new ideas from fans as to how the bars operate.

Plans were underway to relocate the club to land at the side of the Peaks Parkway in Grimsby. As of 2020, new plans have been agreed with the council, Grimsby Town FC and The Freemen of Grimsby to build the stadium on recently cleared land off Freeman Street.

== Rivalries ==
Club	Last Match	Season
Scunthorpe United	L 3–0	2020–21
Hull City	L 3–0	2020–21
Doncaster Rovers	W 2–1	2024–25
Lincoln City	W 2–1	2025–26
Boston United	W 6–0	2006–07
Barnsley	W 6–1	2003–04
Rotherham United	L 2–1	2009–10
Sheffield Wednesday	W 1–0	2025–26
Sheffield United	L 4–2	2016–17

Grimsby Town's geographical position places them among several regional rivals, particularly clubs from the former county of Humberside. Traditionally, Hull City—based across the Humber Estuary—have been seen as Grimsby's main rivals. However, differing fortunes have meant the two clubs have rarely met in recent decades; their last league encounter came in 1987, with only occasional EFL Trophy meetings since.

Scunthorpe United, Grimsby's nearest professional neighbours, are now generally considered the club's primary rivals. Although Scunthorpe historically played in lower divisions, the balance shifted in the 2000s when Grimsby's decline coincided with Scunthorpe's rise. Meetings between Hull, Scunthorpe, and Grimsby are often dubbed the Humber derby, though long periods have been known to pass without league fixtures between all three sides.

Lincoln City also provides a local derby known as the Lincolnshire derby, but the rivalry is relatively minor from Grimsby's perspective. While many Lincoln fans see Grimsby as their main rivals, the feeling isn’t always fully returned. As with other regional opponents, the two clubs have often been in different divisions for long spells.

Due to Grimsby's extended time in the second tier during their history, many fans view clubs like Sheffield United, Sheffield Wednesday, and Barnsley as more traditional rivals. Grimsby also share smaller historical rivalries with Doncaster Rovers and Rotherham United depending on divisional overlap.

Within the Borough of North East Lincolnshire, non-league sides such as Grimsby Borough and Cleethorpes Town occasionally meet the Mariners in pre-season or county cup competitions, but these fixtures lack the intensity of professional rivalries.

== Mascot ==
The Mighty Mariner is Grimsby Town's mascot. He wears the club's home strip and normally parades in front of the Pontoon Stand as well as tormenting the opposition's fans. He also plays football with the mascots and warms up the Grimsby Town fans. Up until 1998, there were two club mascots, Mighty and Mini Mariner, and until then they used to wear yellow fishing rain coats, before Mini was dropped, and Mighty was given the home strip to wear. Formerly, the mascot was a character named "Harry Haddock", so-called after Grimsby's fishing industry, who is actually a rainbow trout.

== Supporters ==
The newly rebranded Mariners Trust has been working with the fans and the club on a number of projects and events with the aim of improving the match day experience for the fans. It has a new Junior Mariners section, works with similar GTFC-friendly organisations like the internet mariners and the PPAG and is run by volunteers of 400+ members and continues to encourage GTFC fans to join and get involved. Since the late 1990s Grimsby Town have had a Scandinavian supporters group based in Norway and Sweden. Mariners fans since 2006 have also had a friendship with the supporters of Belgian club Eendracht Aalst.

Actor and comedian Sacha Baron Cohen who is most widely known for creating and portraying the characters Ali G and Borat was spotted at Grimsby Town's home game against Cambridge United during the 2013–14 season. He watched The Mariners 1–0 defeat before talking to fans in the Blundell Hotel dressed in a Grimsby shirt and hat. Cohen had been in the town to think of ideas for a new film and had also visited the town's fish docks. In December 2013 it was announced that Cohen would be appearing in a new film called Grimsby. Notable Mariners fans include Soccer AM presenter and comedian Lloyd Griffith, American actor and television presenter Adam Richman. Despite not being from Grimsby or England, the Man v. Food presenter said he is a supporter of the club, and was involved in a BBC Radio 5 Live phone-in before the 2013 FA Trophy final between Grimsby and Wrexham. In 2015 Richman contributed to a fan fundraiser "Operation Promotion" and in June 2020 became a club shareholder.

Grimsby-born actor Thomas Turgoose, who starred as the lead role character Shaun Fields in the drama film This Is England and the TV follow-up's This Is England '86, This Is England '88 and This Is England '90, is a season ticket holder. He appeared as a guest on Sky show Soccer AM in 2007 sporting a Grimsby Town shirt.

Other famous fans include politician Norman Lamont, former professional snooker players Mike Hallett and Dean Reynolds, singer and songwriter Ella Henderson and BBC weather presenter Keeley Donovan.

Grimsby Town supporters are known for bringing inflatable fish, named "Harry Haddock", to important matches. The tradition began during the 1980s when a trend of bringing inflatable toys (such as bananas or dinosaurs) to games swept across English football terraces. A local newspaper columnist suggested that Grimsby fans adopt a blow-up fish as their symbol, given the area's connection to commercial fishing; hundreds of fans would later queue to purchase a supply of toys and the fish have appeared in the stands ever since, now sold in the club shop and online. A controversy arose during the Mariners' 2023 FA Cup run when Southampton F.C. initially prohibited Grimsby supporters from bringing in Harrys citing a club policy. Following a substantial online outcry and several petitions, Southampton relented and allowed more than five hundred Harry Haddocks into the ground.

== Grimsby Town Women ==
In May 2019, it was announced that Grimsby Town would enter the world of female football with the launch of its first ever affiliated women's team with trials being held at the academy team's training base at Oasis Academy Wintringham. The 2019/20 season saw the team venture into league football in the Lincolnshire Women's League, the then 7th tier of women's football with their first ever league fixture being against Appleby Frodingham Ladies led by newly appointed manager Dale Houlston.

In a season that was cut short in March 2020 because of the COVID-19 pandemic, Grimsby Town Women remained undefeated. They also reached the League Cup final and the Lincolnshire Women's County Cup final however none of those cup finals took place because of the pandemic.

During the summer of 2020, the FA announced that following a restructure to the leagues, Grimsby Town Women would be promoted to the 6th tier of the women's football pyramid, meaning that the team commenced the 2020–21 season in the East Midlands Women's Regional Football League, Division 1 North. The 2020–21 season also saw Grimsby Town Women enter The FA Women's Cup for the very first time.

Grimsby Town Women commenced the 2021–22 season well and led the league. In November of this season, manager Dale Houlston resigned his position, having played seven games, with six wins and one draw. Hayley Cox was named as the new manager. By the end of the season, they had managed to achieve second place in the league.

In the 2022–23 season Grimsby Town Women secured the league title and promotion to the East Midland's Premier Division.

After promotion, Grimsby Town Ladies played tougher opposition in the 2023–24 season and were relegated however they did pick up some silverware, winning the Marsh Sports County Plate in a 10–0 victory over HBW United Ladies. On the conclusion of the season, the club parted company with manager Hayley Cox.

On 23 August 2024, Ben Challen was appointed as the new Women's First Team Head Coach having taken charge on an interim basis in June. He stepped down from the role in April 2025 to focus on his work with the Emerging Talent Centre at the club.

Ben Thomas took over as Women's First Team Head Coach on 11 June 2025, having previously served as Assistant Head Coach under his predecessor.

== Players ==
=== Current squad ===
As of 11 November 2026

Note: Flags indicate national team as defined under FIFA eligibility rules; some limited exceptions apply. Players may hold more than one non-FIFA nationality.

No.	Pos.	Nation	Player
1	GK	ENG	Harvey Cartwright (on loan from Hull City)
2	DF	ALB	Maldini Kacurri
3	DF	ENG	Jayden Sweeney
4	MF	ENG	Kieran Green (captain)
5	DF	ENG	Harvey Rodgers
7	MF	SCO	Jamie Walker
8	MF	IRL	Cian Doyle
9	FW	WAL	Iwan Morgan
10	FW	ENG	Sonny Finch
11	MF	ENG	Ryley Reynolds (on loan from Notts County)
12	DF	ENG	Joe Foulkes
14	MF	ENG	Justin Amaluzor
15	MF	FRO	Géza Dávid Turi
16	DF	IRL	Reece Staunton
17	DF	ENG	Cameron McJannet
18	MF	ENG	Kristian Catchpole
19	FW	ENG	Josh Andrews
22	FW	SCO	Cameron Gardner
24	DF	ENG	Doug Tharme

No.	Pos.	Nation	Player
26	DF	ALB	Edon Pruti
28	MF	ENG	Fin Cartwright (on loan from Middlesbrough)
29	MF	ENG	Mark Shelton (on loan from York City)
30	MF	ENG	Charles Vernam
31	GK	NIR	Christy Pym
37	DF	ENG	Charlie Elliott
39	FW	ENG	Andy Cook
41	GK	ENG	Seb Auton
47	FW	ENG	Ted Sharp
48	MF	ROU	Darius Neagu
49	FW	ENG	Curtis Manyika
50	DF	ENG	Malaki Golding
51	FW	ENG	Fortune Jack
52	FW	ENG	Harvey Booth
53	DF	ENG	James Binks
54	DF	ENG	Joshua Edwards
55	MF	ENG	Noah Hutton
56	GK	ENG	Rhys Hall
57	DF	ENG	Tyler Pratt
58	FW	ENG	Max Horsman

=== Out on loan ===
Note: Flags indicate national team as defined under FIFA eligibility rules; some limited exceptions apply. Players may hold more than one non-FIFA nationality.

No.	Pos.	Nation	Player
6	DF	SCO	Samuel Lavelle (at Hartlepool United until 13 November 2026)
23	MF	ENG	Henry Brown (at Cleethorpes Town until 11 October 2026)
35	FW	ENG	Elliot Smith (at Beverley Town until 7 November 2026)
36	DF	ENG	Alex Graham (at Grimsby Borough until 21 November 2026)

=== Academy squad ===
As of 23 October 2026

Note: Flags indicate national team as defined under FIFA eligibility rules; some limited exceptions apply. Players may hold more than one non-FIFA nationality.

No.	Pos.	Nation	Player
–	GK	ENG	Joe Roberts
56	GK	ENG	Rhys Hall
54	DF	ENG	Josh Edwards
57	DF	ENG	Tyler Pratt
–	DF	ENG	Cameron Carter
53	DF	ENG	James Binks
–	DF	ENG	Keelan Bryan
–	DF	ENG	Henry Chisholm
50	DF	ENG	Malaki Golding

No.	Pos.	Nation	Player
–	MF	ENG	George Smith
–	MF	ENG	Lennon Peterson
–	MF	ENG	Harry Ward
47	FW	ENG	Ted Sharp
52	FW	ENG	Harvey Booth
49	FW	ENG	Curtis Manyika
51	FW	ENG	Fortune Jack
48	FW	ROU	Darius Neagu

== Club officials ==
=== Board and management officials ===
Role	Name
Chairman	Andrew Pettit (LLB)
Vice Chairman	Lord Jason Stockwood (BPhil)
Director	Kristine Green
Director	Dave Roberts
Chief Executive	Polly Bancroft
Non-Executive Director	Gareth Jennings
Non-Executive Director	Richard Hallsworth
Chief Operating Officer	Adam Smith
Accounts Manager	Steve Wraith
Club Secretary	Kristine Green

=== First Team staff ===
Role	Name
Head coach	(Gibraltar) David Artell
Assistant Head Coach	(England) Tom Culshaw
Goalkeeping Coach	(England) Steve Croudson
Player Recruitment Lead	(England) Ryan Bennett
First Team Performance Analyst	(England) Ray Shearwood
Physiotherapist	(England) Bryony Woolley
Sports Scientist	(England) Greg Howard
Club Physician	(England) Frank Howells

=== Academy staff ===
Role	Name
Academy Manager	(England) Neil Woods
Head of Coaching	(England) Lawrence Heward
Head of Recruitment	(England) Dave Collins
Lead Youth Development Phase Coach	(England) Ben Davies
Youth Development Phase Coordinator	(England) Lawrence Heward
Head of Education & Player Care	(England) Oliver Bradbury
Foundation Phase Lead	(England) Oliver Bradbury
Professional Development Phase Lead	(England) Callum Lester
Senior Academy Physiotherapist	(England) Emily Barrett-Moore
Lead Academy Physiotherapist	(England) Lottie Evans
Player Care Coordinator	(England) Kris Hoskins
Community Engagement Officer	(England) Denver Hume
Academy Strength and Conditioning Coach	(England) Curtis Holmes
Women's Team Head Coach	(England) Ben Thomas
Women's Team Assistant Head Coach	(England) Dan Jackson

== Managerial history ==
As of 14 May 2024

=== Managers ===
Dates	Name
1902–1920	(England) Harry Newmarch Hickson
1920	(Wales) Haydn Price
1921–1924	(Scotland) George Fraser
1924–1932	(England) Wilf Gillow
1932–1936	(England) Frank Womack
1937–1951	(England) Charlie Spencer
1951	(England) Frank Womack (Note: Caretaker Manager)
1951–1954	(Scotland) Bill Shankly
1954	(Hungary) Elemér Berkessy
1954–1955	(Republic of Ireland) Billy Walsh
1955–1959	(England) Allenby Chilton
1960–1962	(England) Tim Ward
1962–1964	(Scotland) Tom Johnston
1964–1967	(Scotland) Jimmy McGuigan
1967–1968	(England) Don McEvoy
1968–1969	(England) Bill Harvey
1969–1971	(Scotland) Bobby Kennedy
1971–1973	(England) Lawrie McMenemy
1973–1975	(England) Ron Ashman
1975–1976	(Northern Ireland) Tommy Casey
1976–1978	(England) Johnny Newman
1979–1982	(Scotland) George Kerr
1982–1985	(England) Dave Booth
1985	(England) Peter Grotier (Note: Player Manager)
1985–1987	(England) Mick Lyons
1987–1988	(Scotland) Bobby Roberts
1988–1994	(England) Alan Buckley
1994–1996	(England) Brian Laws
1996	(England) John Cockerill
1997	(England) Kenny Swain
1997–2000	(England) Alan Buckley
2000	(England) John Cockerill
2000–2001	(England) Lennie Lawrence
2001–2004	(England) Paul Groves
2004	(England) Graham Rodger
2004	(England) Nicky Law
2004–2006	(England) Russell Slade
2006	(England) Graham Rodger
2006	(England) Stuart Watkiss
2006–2008	(England) Alan Buckley
2008	(England) Stuart Watkiss
2008–2009	(England) Mike Newell
2009–2011	(England) Neil Woods
2011	(England) David Moore & (Scotland) Robbie Stockdale
2011–2013	(England) Rob Scott & (England) Paul Hurst
2013–2016	(England) Paul Hurst (Note: Hurst took sole charge)
2016	(England) Dave Moore & (England) Stuart Watkiss
2016–2017	(England) Marcus Bignot
2017–2018	(England) Russell Slade
2018	(England) Paul Wilkinson
2018–2019	(England) Michael Jolley
2019	(Australia) Anthony Limbrick
2019–2020	(England) Ian Holloway (Note: Manager & Club Director)
2020	(England) Ben Davies
2020–2023	(England) Paul Hurst
2023–2023	(England) Ben Davies & (England) Shaun Pearson
2023–	(Gibraltar) David Artell

=== Assistant managers ===
Year	Assistant Manager
1926–1927	(England) John Percy
1927–1930	(England) Herbert Woods
1930–1932	(England) Bill Hopkins
1932–1933	(England) Herbert Woods
1933–1939	(England) Tommy Atherton
1945–1948	(Scotland) Johnny McIlwaine
1948–1955	(England) Tommy Dawson
1955–1957	(England) Bill Lambton
1957–1959	(England) Ronald Humpston
1959–1962	(England) Bill Lambton
1962–1971	(Scotland) George Higgins
1972–1974	(Scotland) Jim Clunie
1974–1975	(England) Colin Appleton
1975–1976	(Scotland) George Aitken
1976–1978	(England) Dick Conner
1978–1979	(Scotland) George Kerr
1980–1982	(England) Dave Booth
1982–1984	(England) Trevor Whymark
1984–1985	(England) Chris Nicholl
1985–1986	(England) Terry Darracott
1986–1988	(Republic of Ireland) Don O'Riordan
1988–1994	(Scotland) Arthur Mann
1994–1997	(England) Kenny Swain
1997–2001	(England) John Cockerill
2001–2006	(England) Graham Rodger
2006–2009	(England) Stuart Watkiss
2009	(England) Brian Stein
2009–2010	(England) Chris Casper
2010–2011	(England) David Moore
2013–2016	(Scotland) Chris Doig
2016–2017	(England) Micky Moore
2017–2018	(England) Paul Wilkinson
2018–2020	(Australia) Anthony Limbrick
2020–2023	(Scotland) Chris Doig
2023–2026	(England) Shaun Pearson
2026–	(England) Tom Culshaw

=== Chairman ===
Year	Chairman
1878–1885	(England) Sir John Dugdale Astley, 3rd Baronet
1885	(England) Henry Smethurst
1885–1889	(England) Charles Carter
1889	(England) Edward Heneage
1894–1896	(England) Frederick Coulson
1896–1900	(England) Christmas White
1900	(England) William Bellamy
1901–1903	(England) Frederick Coulson
1905–1906	(England) John Thompson
1906–1908	(England) William Goodwin
1908–1920	(England) Alfred Cooper
1920–1923	(England) James Plaistow
1928–1931	(England) Joseph Stookes
1931–1954	(England) George Pearce
1954–1968	(England) Frederick Would
1968–1969	(England) Roy Osmond
1969	(England) Frederick Would
1969–1979	(England) Henry Hamilton
1979–1985	(England) Richard Middleton
1985	(England) Dudley Ramsden
1985	(England) Thomas Bygott
1985–1987	(England) Walter Ramsden
1987–1994	(England) Peter Furneaux
1994–1999	(England) Bill Carr
1999–2001	(England) Doug Everitt
2001–2004	(England) Peter Furneaux
2004–2011	(England) John Fenty
2011–2020	(England) John Fenty (de facto)
2020–2021	(England) Philip Day
2021–2024	(England) Jason Stockwood
2024–	(England) Andrew Pettit

== Notable former players and managers ==
Person	Grimsby record	Claim to fame
(Hungary) Elemér Berkessy	Manager, 1954	Became the first foreign manager in English football with Grimsby.
(England) Jackie Bestall	Player, 1926–1938 (427 games, 76 goals)	1 England cap (6 February 1935, vs Ireland, 2–1, Goodison Park). Has the smallest road in Grimsby and Cleethorpes named after him, the only Town footballer to be honoured in this way.
(England) Harry Betmead	Player, 1930–1947 (296 games, 10 goals)	1 England cap (20 May 1937, vs Finland, 8–0, Helsinki)
(England) Garry Birtles	Player, 1989–1991 (69 games, 9 goals)	Won the European Cup title twice with Nottingham Forest under Brian Clough, as well as winning the First Division, English League Cup and the UEFA Super Cup with Forest. He also spent two years playing for Manchester United.
(Northern Ireland) Kingsley Black	Player, 1996–2001 (141 games, 8 goals)	Won the League Cup with Luton Town in 1988. Played in the top flight for both Luton and Nottingham Forest. Also earned 30 caps for Northern Ireland, scoring once.
(Italy) Ivano Bonetti	Player, 1995–96 (22 games, 4 goals)	Played in the Italian Serie A for Juventus, Sampdoria and Torino amongst others. Became famous for the "plate of chicken" incident which occurred when Grimsby manager Brian Laws launched a plate of chicken at Bonetti during a half time team talk.
(England) Alan Buckley	Manager, 1988–1994, 1997–2000, 2006–2008	Club's most successful manager winning 3 promotions and 1 cup, including the Wembley Double 1997–98 season.
(Wales) Danny Coyne	Player, 1999–2003 (181 games)	Welsh international goalkeeper 1996–2007, 11 caps. Won two Player of the Season awards before moving to the Premier League with Leicester City.
(New Zealand) Max Crocombe	Player, 2021–2023 (89 games)	New Zealand international goalkeeper, 25 caps. OFC Nations Cup winner.
(England) Gary Croft	Player, 1992–1996 & 2005–2007 (248 games, 4 goals)	Became the record signing when sold to Blackburn Rovers for £1.6 million in 1996, until the sale of John Oster a year later. Became the first footballer to play with an electronic tag after being charged with driving offences whilst playing for Ipswich Town.
(England) Tony Ford MBE	Player, 1975–1986 & 1991–94 (423 games, 58 goals)	Holds all-time record, 931, for matches played in the English league by an outfield player. Youngest player to play for the club aged 16 years 143 days, 4 October 1975.
(Scotland) Hughie Gallacher	Player, 1937–1938 (12 games, 3 goals)	20 Scotland caps, 23 Scotland goals, member of the Wembley Wizards who beat England 5–1 in 1928
(Wales) Pat Glover	Player, 1929–1938 (227 games, 180 goals)	Welsh international striker (1931–1937), 7 caps. Holds club records for most league goals in a career and in a season (42) as well as most international caps whilst a Grimsby player.
(England) Paul Groves	Player, 1992–1996 & 1997–2004 (377 games, 71 goals); Manager, 2001–2004	Wembley Double-winning captain from the 1997–98 season.
(England) Dean Henderson	Player (loan), 2016–2017 (7 games)	England goalkeeper, 5 caps. Winner of the 2024–25 FA Cup, 2025 FA Community Shield and 2026 UEFA Conference League with Crystal Palace.
(England) Phil Jevons	Player, 2001–2004 (63 games, 18 goals)	Scored a 35-yard winning goal in extra time to give Grimsby a 2–1 victory over Liverpool at Anfield.
(England) John McDermott	Player, 1987–2007 (647 games, 10 goals)	Club's all-time leading appearance holder with 755 games in all competitions.
(England) Lawrie McMenemy	Manager 1971–1973	Was the manager of Southampton when they won the FA Cup in 1976.
(England) Clive Mendonca	Player, 1991–1997 (187 games, 64 goals)	Winner of Grimsby's BBC cult heroes poll in 2004. Scored a hat-trick in Charlton Athletic's 1998 play-off final win.
(Denmark) David Nielsen	Player, 2000–2001 (17 games, 5 goals)	Won the Danish Cup with FC Copenhagen in 1997. Also played top-flight football in Denmark for Aalborg BK, and FC Midtjylland, as well as Lyngby FC, IK Start and SK Brann in Norway.
(Wales) John Oster	Player, 1996–1997 & 2002–2003 (42 games, 10 goals)	Having started his career with the club, he went on to play International football for Wales, and also played in the English Premier League with Everton, Sunderland and Reading as well as being the club's record sale at £2 million in 1997.
(Republic of Ireland) Michael Reddy	Player, 2004–2007 (104 games, 23 goals)	Is currently the only Grimsby player to be named in the PFA Team of the Year
(Scotland) Bill Shankly OBE	Manager, 1951–1953	Liverpool Manager 1959–1974, 3 League titles, 2 FA Cup wins, 1 UEFA Cup win.
(England) Graham Taylor OBE	Player, 1962–1968 (189 games, 2 goals)	England Manager 1990–93, W 18 D 13 L 7.
(England) George Tweedy	Player, 1932–1952 (347 games); Caretaker Manager 1950–51	1 England cap (2 December 1936, vs Hungary, 6–2, Highbury)
(Republic of Ireland) Billy Walsh	Manager, 1954–1955	Played for Manchester City and international football for four different teams, England Schoolboys, both Ireland teams, the FAI XI and the IFA XI, and New Zealand
(China) Zhang Enhua	Player, 2000–2001 (17 games, 3 goals)	Was the international captain of China, which included appearing in 2002 FIFA World Cup. In all Enhua featured 68 times, scoring 7 for his country.

== Seasons ==
From	To	League	Level	Total Seasons
1889–90	1891–92	Football Alliance	2	3
1892–93	1900–01	Second Division	2	9
1901–02	1902–03	First Division	1 ▲	2
1903–04	1909–10	Second Division	2 ▼	7
1910–11	1910–11	Midland League	N/A	1
1911–12	1919–20	Second Division	2	5
1920–21	1920–21	Third Division South	3 ▼	1
1921–22	1925–26	Third Division North	3	5
1926–27	1928–29	Second Division	2 ▲	3
1929–30	1931–32	First Division	1 ▲	3
1932–33	1933–34	Second Division	2 ▼	2
1934–35	1947–48	First Division	1 ▲	7
1948–49	1950–51	Second Division	2 ▼	3
1951–52	1955–56	Third Division North	3 ▼	5
1956–57	1958–59	Second Division	2 ▲	3
1959–60	1961–62	Third Division	3 ▼	3
1962–63	1963–64	Second Division	2 ▲	2
1964–65	1967–68	Third Division	3 ▼	4
1968–69	1971–72	Fourth Division	4 ▼	4
1972–73	1976–77	Third Division	3 ▲	5
1977–78	1978–79	Fourth Division	4 ▼	2
1979–80	1979–80	Third Division	3 ▲	1
1980–81	1986–87	Second Division	2 ▲	7
1987–88	1987–88	Third Division	3 ▼	1
1988–89	1989–90	Fourth Division	4 ▼	2
1990–91	1990–91	Third Division	3 ▲	1
1991–92	1991–92	Second Division	2 ▲	1
1992–93	1996–97	First Division	2	5
1997–98	1997–98	Second Division	3 ▼	1
1998–99	2002–03	First Division	2 ▲	5
2003–04	2003–04	Second Division	3 ▼	1
2004–05	2009–10	Football League Two	4 ▼	6
2010–11	2014–15	Conference National	5 ▼	5
2015–16	2015–16	National League	5	1
2016–17	2020–21	Football League Two	4 ▲	5
2021–22	2021–22	National League	5 ▼	1
2022–23	2025–26	Football League Two	4 ▲	4

== Club records ==
More clubs have lost their managers after meeting Grimsby Town than after playing any other club.

=== Cup records ===
- Best FA Cup performance: Semi-finals, 1938–39
- Best League Cup performance: Quarter-finals, 1979–80 (replay)
- Best League Trophy performance: Champions, 1997–98
- Best FA Trophy performance: Runners-up, 2012–13, 2015–16

=== Games ===
- Biggest League attendance: 26,605 vs. Stockport County, 11 April 1952
- Biggest FA Cup attendance: 31,651 vs. Wolverhampton Wanderers, 20 February 1937
- Biggest League Cup attendance: 23,115 vs. Wolverhampton Wanderers, 4 December 1979
- Biggest neutral venue attendance: 76,972 vs. Wolverhampton Wanderers, 25 March 1939, FA Cup semi-final at Old Trafford, Manchester
- Smallest League attendance: 1,833 vs. Brentford, 3 May 1969
- Smallest cup attendance: 248 vs. Sunderland U23's, EFL Trophy, 8 November 2017
- Biggest League home win: 8–0 vs. Tranmere Rovers, 4 September 1925
- Biggest cup defeat: 1–8 vs. Phoenix Bessemer, 25 November 1882
- Biggest League defeat: 1–9 vs. Arsenal, 28 January 1931
- Seasons spent at level 1 of the football league system: 12
- Seasons spent at level 2 of the football league system: 55
- Seasons spent at level 3 of the football league system: 28
- Seasons spent at level 4 of the football league system: 19
- Seasons spent at level 5 of the football league system: 7

=== Player records ===
- Most League goals in a season: 42, Pat Glover (1933–34)
- Most League goals in total: 180, Pat Glover (1930–1939)
- Most League appearances: 647, John McDermott (1987–2007)
- Most appearances (all competitions): 754, John McDermott (1987–2007)
- Most capped player while at club: 15 caps, Géza Dávid Turi for Faroe Islands
- Most capped player: 68 caps, Zhang Enhua for China
- Highest transfer fee paid: £550,000 to Preston North End for Lee Ashcroft, 11 August 1998
- Highest transfer fee received: £1.5 million rising to £2 million from Everton for John Oster, 1 August 1997
- Longest serving current player: Kieran Green since July 2022
- Youngest player: Louis Boyd, 15 years and 324 days, vs. Harrogate Town on 8 September 2020.
- Oldest player: Peter Beagrie, 40 years and 322 days, vs. Hartlepool United on 26 September 2006.

== Honours ==
League

- Second Division (level 2)
  - Champions: 1898–99, 1933–34
  - Runners-up: 1928–29
- Third Division North / Third Division / Second Division (level 3)
  - Champions: 1925–26, 1955–56, 1979–80
  - Runners-up: 1951–52, 1961–62
  - Promoted: 1990–91
  - Play-off winners: 1998
- Fourth Division (level 4)
  - Champions: 1971–72
  - Runners-up: 1978–79, 1989–90
- National League (level 5)
  - Play-off winners: 2016, 2022
- Midland League
  - Champions: 1910–11, 1930–31, 1931–32, 1933–34, 1946–47

Cup

- Football League Trophy
  - Winners: 1997–98
  - Runners-up: 2007–08
- Football League Group Cup
  - Winners: 1981–82
- FA Trophy
  - Runners-up: 2012–13, 2015–16
- Lincolnshire Senior Cup
  - Winners (39): 1885–86, 1888–89, 1896–97, 1898–99, 1899–1900, 1900–01, 1901–02, 1902–03, 1905–06, 1908–09, 1912–13, 1920–21, 1922–23, 1924–25, 1928–29, 1929–30, 1932–33, 1935–36, 1936–37, 1937–38, 1946–47, 1949–50, 1952–53, 1967–68, 1972–73, 1975–76, 1979–80, 1983–84, 1986–87, 1989–90, 1991–92, 1992–93, 1993–94, 1994–95, 1995–96, 1999–2000, 2011–12, 2012–13, 2014–15

== In popular culture ==
- In April 2007, it was announced that Grimsby Town had struck a deal with Sky channel Propeller TV to show four 30-minute shows named GTTV. The show mainly focused on player and staff interviews and, match reviews. After the first four shows had aired, the project was eventually scrapped.
- In the 2001 film Mike Bassett: England Manager, Grimsby Town are mentioned as one of the teams Mike Bassett played for during his playing career.
- In the 1995 football hooligan film ID, Grimsby are mentioned as one of the opponents of the fictional Shadwell Town.
- Grimsby Town is the football club that Sacha Baron Cohen's character Nobby supports in the 2016 action comedy film Grimsby.
- The club's 4–5 victory away at Wrexham in the National League play-off semi-final is the main feature of Season 1, Episode 18 of the documentary Welcome to Wrexham which follows the purchase of Wrexham by Hollywood actors Ryan Reynolds and Rob McElhenney. The episode features a segment about the club and an interview with Grimsby chairman Jason Stockwood.
- Grimsby were the subject of the documentary All Town Aren't We by local filmmaker Jack Spring. The documentary centred around the 2021 takeover and the 2021–22 promoting-winning campaign. The documentary was distributed onto and available to stream via Amazon Prime Video.
- The opening sequence of the 2025 film Marching Powder, starring Danny Dyer, depicts Dyer's character Jack Jones and his hooligan firm fighting a fictional group of Grimsby Town hooligans during an away match in the town. Jones is arrested following the confrontation and given six weeks to reform or face imprisonment, providing the premise for the remainder of the film.
