= Andrew Pettit =

English businessman

- Born: Grimsby, Lincolnshire, England
- Education: University of Sussex; Université libre de Bruxelles
- Occupations: Chairman, businessman, entrepreneur, director
- Board member of: Chairman of Grimsby Town F.C.; Co-Founder, Revcap; Director, Create Real Estate; Founder Patron, Horizon Youth Zone

Andrew Pettit (born March 1968) is an English businessman who is current football chairman and joint majority shareholder of Grimsby Town.

== Early life ==
Pettit attended Hereford School as a boy, and was the first within his family to attend university.

Pettit is a lifelong supporter of his home town football club Grimsby Town; in 1975 he attended his first game against Stockport County.

== Business career ==
Pettit graduated from the University of Sussex with a BA (Hons) in Law and French, becoming a qualified solicitor. He also holds a postgraduate licence in EU law from the Université libre de Bruxelles, as well as speaking French fluently.

Pettit formerly worked several months in France for Airbus. Prior to becoming managing director and head of the European real estate principal transactions business at Lehman Brothers, and a solicitor at Clifford Chance one of the world's largest law firms in the property sector.

Pettit is one of the founding partners of Revcap, a private equity real estate business in 2004.

== Football ownership ==
Pettit was announced as part of a consortium, led by London businessman Tom Shutes, which was interested in buying out John Fenty's majority control of Grimsby Town. Shutes later pulled out for personal reasons, which prompted Pettit and other consortium member Jason Stockwood to form a company called 1878 Partners, which on 5 May 2021 successfully completed the takeover of the club with Stockwood named as chairman.

On 14 May 2024, Pettit was named the new chairman of Grimsby Town, replacing Jason Stockwood taking over for a consecutive three-year term.
