= Performance analysis =

Performance analysis may refer to:

- Performance attribution, a technique for analysing performance of funds in finance
- Profiling (computer programming), the analysis of computer performance
