= Gareth Jennings =

English football director

- Born: Derby, Derbyshire England
- Education: University of Oxford
- Occupations: Football technical director; Technical advisor; Advisory board member
- Board member of: Technical Director of UAE Pro League; Technical Advisor of Grimsby Town; Advisory Board Member of Welsh Football Association
Association football career
- Position: Midfielder
Team information
- Current team: Grimsby Town (technical advisor)
Youth career
- Stoke City
Senior career*
Years	Team	Apps	(Gls)
- Stoke City
- Portsmouth
- Sutton Coldfield Town
1996–1998	Gresley Rovers		
- Hednesford Town
- → Stafford Rangers (loan)
- Rushall Olympic
2001–2002	Gresley Rovers		
- Telford United
International career
- England U19
- * Club domestic league appearances and goals

Gareth Jennings is an English football director, coach, technical advisor and former player. He is the technical director of the UAE Pro League, technical advisor on the board at EFL League Two club Grimsby Town and a member of the technical advisory board of the Welsh Football Association. He also sits on the Technical Committee of the Association of Sporting Directors.

As a player he was a midfielder who was contracted to Stoke City and Portsmouth as a professional. He has previously worked for FIFA as Head of Technical Leadership and technical expert, as well as worked as Academy Director at Leicester City, Bristol City and Stoke City. He has also held roles with the English Football Association and New Zealand Football.

== Playing career ==
Jennings began his career with Stoke City as a youth team player before signing professional terms and joining Portsmouth. He later had spells with non-league sides Telford United, Hednesford Town, Stafford Rangers, Gresley Rovers, Sutton Town, and Rushall Olympic. He played at England U19 level.

== Coaching career ==
Jennings holds a UEFA Pro Licence and Advanced Youth Licence (Professional Phase) Coaching badges and was appointed as a coach educator by the English Football Association in 2009, a position he held until 2014. In 2012 he mixed that role with being the Head of Academy Education at Leicester City in 2014.

He joined Bristol City in 2014 as Academy Director and Head of Coaching, a role he left a year later when he returned to Leicester City as the academy director during the season the club won the Premier League.

He moved to Stoke City as academy director at the start of the 2016–17 season and remained with the club until 2019. During his tenure he oversaw seven players transition from academy player into the first team including Harry Souttar, Tyrese Campbell and Julien Ngoy.

== Football Advisor ==
Jennings has a Masters in International Sports Law from ISDE Business & Law School and has also completed the Executive Leadership Programme at Oxford University.

In April 2019, Jennings left his role at Stoke City to become a technical advisor for FIFA as the head of their technical leadership programme.

Jennings made the move to New Zealand Football in July 2021, as he was appointed as General Manager of High Performance overseeing all National Teams at both Senior and Youth Level. In August 2022 he joined the Welsh Football Association as part of their technical advisory board, and also joined the Technical Committee of the Association of Sporting Directors.

Jennings was appointed to the board of Grimsby Town at the beginning of the 2023–24 season, being hired as a technical advisor. vice-chairman Andrew Pettit stated "We are delighted to add Gareth’s extensive football experience into the board conversations. As we look to set the ambition for the next ten years, we feel his knowledge – alongside Twenty First Group and the existing management team – will help us make informed decisions about where we can progress as a club."

In April 2023, Jennings was appointed as the technical director of the UAE Pro League, a role he will work in tandem with his position at Grimsby Town.
