= List of English football transfers winter 2025–26 =

English football transfer window

The 2025–26 English football transfer window ran from 1 January to 2 February 2026. Players without a club could be signed at any time, clubs could sign players on loan dependent on their league's regulations, and clubs could sign a goalkeeper on an emergency loan if they had no registered senior goalkeeper available. This list includes transfers featuring at least one club from either the Premier League or the EFL that were completed after the end of the summer 2025 transfer window on 1 September 2025 and before the end of the 2026 winter window.

== Transfers ==
All players and clubs without a flag are English. While Cardiff City, Swansea City, Wrexham and Newport County are affiliated with the Football Association of Wales and thus take the Welsh flag, they play in the Championship, League One and League Two respectively, and so their transfers are included here.

Date	Player	Moving from	Moving to	Fee
2 September 2025	İlkay Gündoğan	Manchester City	Galatasaray	Free
3 September 2025	Reuben Egan	Unattached	Wrexham	Free
6 September 2025	Fran Vieites	Unattached	Leicester City	Free
8 September 2025	Chuks Aneke	Unattached	Shrewsbury Town	Free
10 September 2025	Łukasz Fabiański	Unattached	West Ham United	Free
18 September 2025	Jack Vale	Unattached	Northampton Town	Free
19 September 2025	Ben Hamer	Unattached	Queens Park Rangers	Free
29 September 2025	Onel Hernández	Unattached	Charlton Athletic	Free
30 September 2025	Charlie McCann	Unattached	Barrow	Free
1 October 2025	Mackenzie Chapman	Unattached	Salford City	Free
4 October 2025	Ben Stevenson	Unattached	Cheltenham Town	Free
6 October 2025	Shaun MacDonald	Unattached	Newport County	Free
10 October 2025	Aaron McGowan	Unattached	Tranmere Rovers	Free
10 October 2025	Jonathan Tomkinson	Unattached	Cheltenham Town	Free
13 October 2025	Marvin Johnson	Unattached	Port Vale	Free
17 October 2025	Fabio Borini	Unattached	Salford City	Free
17 October 2025	Jaïro Riedewald	Unattached	Sheffield United	Free
17 October 2025	Josh Ruffels	Unattached	Shrewsbury Town	Free
20 October 2025	Britt Assombalonga	Unattached	Barnet	Free
23 October 2025	Tom Lockyer	Unattached	Bristol Rovers	Free
31 October 2025	Jamal Lewis	Unattached	Preston North End	Free
5 November 2025	Joe Ralls	Unattached	Plymouth Argyle	Free
5 November 2025	Randell Williams	Unattached	Reading	Free
6 November 2025	Oriol Romeu	Unattached	Southampton	Free
7 November 2025	Dynel Simeu	Unattached	Oldham Athletic	Free
10 November 2025	Hakeeb Adelakun	Unattached	Cheltenham Town	Free
12 November 2025	Andy Rinomhota	Unattached	Reading	Free
13 November 2025	Patrick Bamford	Unattached	Sheffield United	Free
14 November 2025	Kemar Roofe	Unattached	Walsall	Free
17 November 2025	Liam Cooper	Unattached	Sheffield Wednesday	Free
18 November 2025	Jack Hunt	Unattached	Stockport County	Free
21 November 2025	Kyle Jameson	Unattached	Harrogate Town	Free
27 November 2025	Nathan Redmond	Unattached	Sheffield Wednesday	Free
28 November 2025	Callum Morton	Unattached	Bristol Rovers	Free
28 November 2025	Jérôme Roussillon	Unattached	Charlton Athletic	Free
1 January 2026	Alysson	Grêmio	Aston Villa	£10.5m
1 January 2026	Josh Honohan	Shamrock Rovers	Lincoln City	Undisclosed
1 January 2026	Grant Horton	Waterford	Harrogate Town	Free
1 January 2026	Freddie Ladapo	Unattached	Chesterfield	Free
1 January 2026	Mason Melia	St Patrick's Athletic	Tottenham Hotspur	Undisclosed
1 January 2026	Malik Owolabi-Belewu	Forge FC	Chesterfield	Free
1 January 2026	Taylor Richards	Unattached	Crawley Town	Free
1 January 2026	Dion Sanderson	Birmingham City	Derby County	Undisclosed
1 January 2026	Theo Vassell	Unattached	Crawley Town	Free
2 January 2026	Pablo	Gil Vicente	West Ham United	£21.8m
2 January 2026	Fraser Forster	Unattached	Bournemouth	Free
2 January 2026	Oscar Fraulo	Borussia Mönchengladbach	Derby County	Undisclosed
2 January 2026	Pascal Groß	Borussia Dortmund	Brighton & Hove Albion	£1.5m
2 January 2026	Brennan Johnson	Tottenham Hotspur	Crystal Palace	£35m
2 January 2026	Bayley McCann	Barnsley	Doncaster Rovers	Free
2 January 2026	Sam Morsy	Unattached	Bristol City	Free
2 January 2026	Darren Robinson	Derby County	Doncaster Rovers	Free
2 January 2026	Kai Wagner	Philadelphia Union	Birmingham City	Undisclosed
2 January 2026	Ranel Young	Unattached	Bristol City	Free
3 January 2026	Ryan de Havilland	Peterborough United	Bristol Rovers	Undisclosed
3 January 2026	Akin Odimayo	Newport County	Crawley Town	Free
3 January 2026	Jonny Russell	Glentoran	Crawley Town	Undisclosed
4 January 2026	James Debayo	Unattached	Hull City	Free
5 January 2026	Ali Ahmed	Vancouver Whitecaps	Norwich City	Undisclosed
5 January 2026	Taty Castellanos	Lazio	West Ham United	Undisclosed
5 January 2026	Luis Guilherme	West Ham United	Sporting CP	Undisclosed
5 January 2026	Emil Hansson	Birmingham City	Excelsior	Undisclosed
6 January 2026	Hakeeb Adelakun	Cheltenham Town	Doncaster Rovers	Free
6 January 2026	Eoghan O'Connell	Unattached	Barnsley	Free
6 January 2026	Lewis Temple	Shelbourne	Bolton Wanderers	Undisclosed
7 January 2026	Zach Awe	Southampton	Salford City	Undisclosed
7 January 2026	Luke Browne	Crystal Palace	Notts County	Undisclosed
7 January 2026	Alex Pattison	Bradford City	Walsall	Undisclosed
8 January 2026	Jak Alnwick	Cardiff City	Huddersfield Town	Undisclosed
8 January 2026	Jake Bickerstaff	Wrexham	Cheltenham Town	Undisclosed
8 January 2026	Will Forrester	Bolton Wanderers	Leyton Orient	Undisclosed
8 January 2026	George Nurse	Shrewsbury Town	Cheltenham Town	Free
8 January 2026	Magnus Westergaard	Wycombe Wanderers	Vålerenga	Undisclosed
8 January 2026	Ben Wiles	Huddersfield Town	Milton Keynes Dons	Undisclosed
9 January 2026	Victor Adeboyejo	Bolton Wanderers	Mansfield Town	Undisclosed
9 January 2026	Kain Adom	Gateshead	Burton Albion	Undisclosed
9 January 2026	Leo Castledine	Chelsea	Middlesbrough	Undisclosed
9 January 2026	Ronnie Edwards	Southampton	Queens Park Rangers	Undisclosed
9 January 2026	Ryan Graydon	Fleetwood Town	Salford City	Undisclosed
9 January 2026	Jay Matete	Sunderland	Milton Keynes Dons	Undisclosed
9 January 2026	Tom Pearce	Unattached	Chesterfield	Free
9 January 2026	Antoine Semenyo	Bournemouth	Manchester City	£65m
9 January 2026	Joel Ward	Unattached	Swansea City	Free
10 January 2026	Ronan Curtis	Port Vale	Plymouth Argyle	Undisclosed
10 January 2026	Beck-Ray Enoru	Tamworth	Notts County	Undisclosed
10 January 2026	Ian Lawlor	Doncaster Rovers	Crewe Alexandra	Undisclosed
10 January 2026	Elliott Moore	Unattached	Northampton Town	Free
11 January 2026	Kaye Furo	Club Brugge	Brentford	Undisclosed
11 January 2026	Danilo Orsi	AFC Wimbledon	Crawley Town	Undisclosed
12 January 2026	Killian Barrett	Sheffield Wednesday	Barrow	Undisclosed
12 January 2026	Brian Madjo	Metz	Aston Villa	Undisclosed
12 January 2026	Stefán Teitur Þórðarson	Preston North End	Hannover 96	Undisclosed
13 January 2026	James Belshaw	Harrogate Town	Notts County	Undisclosed
13 January 2026	Nick Freeman	Stevenage	Shrewsbury Town	Free
13 January 2026	Makhtar Gueye	Blackburn Rovers	Shanghai Shenhua	Undisclosed
13 January 2026	Ben Middlemas	Sunderland	Swindon Town	Undisclosed
14 January 2026	Jack Bonham	Stoke City	Bolton Wanderers	Undisclosed
14 January 2026	James Crole	Penybont	Newport County	Undisclosed
14 January 2026	Conor Gallagher	Atlético Madrid	Tottenham Hotspur	£35m
14 January 2026	Fletcher Holman	Wolverhampton Wanderers	Swindon Town	Undisclosed
14 January 2026	Gustav Lindgren	Peterborough United	BK Häcken	Undisclosed
15 January 2026	Joe Anderson	Sunderland	Barrow	Undisclosed
15 January 2026	Lyndon Dykes	Birmingham City	Charlton Athletic	Undisclosed
15 January 2026	David Harrington	Fleetwood Town	Bolton Wanderers	Undisclosed
15 January 2026	Chanse Headman	Brentford	Harrogate Town	Undisclosed
15 January 2026	Finley Munroe	Aston Villa	Middlesbrough	£300,000
15 January 2026	Bali Mumba	Plymouth Argyle	Huddersfield Town	Undisclosed
15 January 2026	Curtis Nelson	Derby County	Milton Keynes Dons	Undisclosed
15 January 2026	Ade Solanke	Lorient	Bournemouth	Undisclosed
16 January 2026	Ebou Adams	Derby County	Portsmouth	£500,000
16 January 2026	Josh Dacres-Cogley	Bolton Wanderers	Stockport County	Undisclosed
16 January 2026	Will Dickson	Manchester City	Chesterfield	Undisclosed
16 January 2026	Riley Harbottle	AFC Wimbledon	Bristol Rovers	Undisclosed
16 January 2026	Mathias Jørgensen	Bodø/Glimt	Blackburn Rovers	Undisclosed
16 January 2026	Lewis Richards	Bradford City	Crawley Town	Undisclosed
16 January 2026	Jocelin Ta Bi	Maccabi Netanya	Sunderland	Undisclosed
16 January 2026	Harry Tyrer	Everton	Cardiff City	Undisclosed
17 January 2026	Lukas Engel	Middlesbrough	Real Salt Lake	Undisclosed
17 January 2026	Charlie Lennon	Middlesbrough	Barnsley	Undisclosed
18 January 2026	Andy Irving	West Ham United	Sparta Prague	Undisclosed
18 January 2026	Jamie McDonnell	Nottingham Forest	Oxford United	Undisclosed
19 January 2026	Marc Guéhi	Crystal Palace	Manchester City	£20m
19 January 2026	Justin Obikwu	Coventry City	Queens Park Rangers	Undisclosed
19 January 2026	Danny Rose	Grimsby Town	Barrow	Undisclosed
20 January 2026	Keshi Anderson	Birmingham City	Portsmouth	Free
20 January 2026	Jeon Jin-woo	Jeonbuk Hyundai Motors	Oxford United	Undisclosed
20 January 2026	August Priske	Djurgårdens IF	Birmingham City	Undisclosed
20 January 2026	Alex Tóth	Ferencváros	Bournemouth	£10.4m
21 January 2026	Alexander Aoraha	Queens Park Rangers	Al-Zawraa	Undisclosed
21 January 2026	Edoardo Bove	Unattached	Watford	Free
21 January 2026	Haydon Roberts	Bristol City	Reading	Undisclosed
21 January 2026	Ruel Sotiriou	Bristol Rovers	Hapoel Jerusalem	Undisclosed
22 January 2026	Isaac Lee	Flint Town United	Shrewsbury Town	Undisclosed
22 January 2026	Max O'Leary	Bristol City	West Bromwich Albion	Undisclosed
22 January 2026	Kabongo Tshimanga	Crawley Town	Barnet	Undisclosed
23 January 2026	Emmanuel Adegboyega	Norwich City	Rotherham United	Undisclosed
23 January 2026	Cameron Antwi	Newport County	Gillingham	Undisclosed
23 January 2026	Kieran Dowell	Rangers	Hull City	Undisclosed
23 January 2026	Ryan Fraser	Southampton	Western Sydney Wanderers	Undisclosed
23 January 2026	Aiden Marsh	Unattached	Harrogate Town	Free
23 January 2026	Anis Mehmeti	Bristol City	Ipswich Town	£3m
23 January 2026	Tola Showunmi	Crawley Town	Louisville City	Undisclosed
24 January 2026	Lee Ndlovu	Barnet	Notts County	Undisclosed
24 January 2026	Alfons Sampsted	Birmingham City	Go Ahead Eagles	Undisclosed
25 January 2026	Deji Elerewe	Bromley	Lincoln City	Undisclosed
26 January 2026	Yisa Alao	Sheffield Wednesday	Chelsea	£500,000
26 January 2026	Justin Ferizaj	Unattached	Crawley Town	Free
26 January 2026	Michael Frey	Queens Park Rangers	Grasshoppers	Undisclosed
26 January 2026	Paris Maghoma	Brentford	Norwich City	Undisclosed
26 January 2026	Benn Ward	Accrington Stanley	Reading	Undisclosed
27 January 2026	Tammy Abraham	Beşiktaş	Aston Villa	£18.25m
27 January 2026	Jahnoah Markelo	Zürich	Coventry City	Undisclosed
27 January 2026	Rayan	Vasco da Gama	Bournemouth	£24.7m
27 January 2026	Mees Rijks	Vålerenga	Bristol Rovers	Undisclosed
27 January 2026	Adama Sidibeh	St Johnstone	Stockport County	Undisclosed
27 January 2026	Carlos Vicente	Alavés	Birmingham City	Undisclosed
28 January 2026	Barry Bannan	Sheffield Wednesday	Millwall	Undisclosed
28 January 2026	Tiernan Brooks	Gateshead	Charlton Athletic	Undisclosed
28 January 2026	Paddy McNair	San Diego FC	Hull City	Undisclosed
28 January 2026	James Plant	Port Vale	Tranmere Rovers	Undisclosed
28 January 2026	Jack Taylor	Sutton United	Stevenage	Undisclosed
28 January 2026	Adama Traoré	Fulham	West Ham United	£2m
29 January 2026	Ronan Hale	Ross County	Gillingham	Undisclosed
29 January 2026	Seb Naylor	Manchester City	Bristol City	Undisclosed
29 January 2026	Aaron Morley	Bolton Wanderers	Wycombe Wanderers	Undisclosed
29 January 2026	Boubakary Soumaré	Leicester City	Al-Duhail	Undisclosed
30 January 2026	Oscar Bobb	Manchester City	Fulham	£27m
30 January 2026	Alfie Chang	Birmingham City	Walsall	Free
30 January 2026	Kayden Jackson	Derby County	Bradford City	Undisclosed
30 January 2026	Maldini Kacurri	Arsenal	Grimsby Town	Undisclosed
30 January 2026	Harry Lewis	Carlisle United	Mansfield Town	Undisclosed
30 January 2026	Tyler Magloire	Workington	Port Vale	Free
30 January 2026	Lucas Paquetá	West Ham United	Flamengo	£35.5m
30 January 2026	Bailey Peacock-Farrell	Birmingham City	Blackpool	Undisclosed
30 January 2026	Rúben Rodrigues	Vitória	Bolton Wanderers	Free
31 January 2026	Rhys Bennett	Manchester United	Fleetwood Town	Undisclosed
31 January 2026	Devante Cole	Port Vale	Luton Town	Undisclosed
31 January 2026	Joe Knight	Brighton & Hove Albion	Stevenage	Undisclosed
1 February 2026	Dapo Afolayan	FC St. Pauli	Blackburn Rovers	Undisclosed
1 February 2026	Lamine Fanne	Luton Town	Venezia	Undisclosed
1 February 2026	Andre Garcia	Reading	Club Brugge	Undisclosed
1 February 2026	Calum Kavanagh	Bradford City	Oldham Athletic	Undisclosed
1 February 2026	Mohamed Toure	Randers	Norwich City	£2.6m
1 February 2026	Zak Vyner	Bristol City	Wrexham	Undisclosed
1 February 2026	Lewis Warrington	Walsall	Tranmere Rovers	Undisclosed
1 February 2026	Willum Þór Willumsson	Birmingham City	NEC	Undisclosed
2 February 2026	Ato Ampah	Chelsea	Stoke City	Undisclosed
2 February 2026	Nilson Angulo	Anderlecht	Sunderland	£17.5m
2 February 2026	Adil Aouchiche	Sunderland	Schalke 04	Undisclosed
2 February 2026	Adam Armstrong	Southampton	Wolverhampton Wanderers	£7m
2 February 2026	Jake Batty	Blackburn Rovers	Swindon Town	Undisclosed
2 February 2026	Omar Beckles	Leyton Orient	Gillingham	Free
2 February 2026	Armel Bella-Kotchap	Southampton	Hellas Verona	£4.32m
2 February 2026	Kevin Berkoe	Salford City	Shrewsbury Town	Undisclosed
2 February 2026	Bailey Cadamarteri	Sheffield Wednesday	Wrexham	Undisclosed
2 February 2026	Leighton Clarkson	Aberdeen	Blackpool	Undisclosed
2 February 2026	Brandon Cover	Leicester City	Rotherham United	Undisclosed
2 February 2026	Madiodio Dia	Haugesund	Portsmouth	Undisclosed
2 February 2026	Ryan Doherty	Stevenage	Ipswich Town	Undisclosed
2 February 2026	Noah Eile	New York Red Bulls	Bristol City	Undisclosed
2 February 2026	Lee Evans	Blackpool	Bradford City	Undisclosed
2 February 2026	Andre Gray	Fatih Karagümrük	Port Vale	Free
2 February 2026	Junior Hoilett	Hibernian	Swindon Town	Undisclosed
2 February 2026	Tomi Horvat	Sturm Graz	Bristol City	Undisclosed
2 February 2026	Jack Hunt	Stockport County	Wigan Athletic	Free
2 February 2026	Yahya Idrissi	Chelsea	Milan	Undisclosed
2 February 2026	Davis Keillor-Dunn	Barnsley	Wrexham	Undisclosed
2 February 2026	Callum Lang	Portsmouth	Preston North End	Undisclosed
2 February 2026	Millar Matthews-Lewis	Hemel Hempstead Town	Burton Albion	Undisclosed
2 February 2026	Fally Mayulu	Bristol City	Arouca	Undisclosed
2 February 2026	Harry McGlinchey	Chelsea	Sheffield United	Undisclosed
2 February 2026	Jacob Mendy	Wrexham	Peterborough United	Undisclosed
2 February 2026	Lewis Montsma	Lincoln City	Dundee	Undisclosed
2 February 2026	Evan Mooney	St Mirren	Arsenal	Undisclosed
2 February 2026	James Morris	Watford	Leyton Orient	Undisclosed
2 February 2026	Derry Murkin	Utrecht	Derby County	Undisclosed
2 February 2026	Marvelous Nakamba	Luton Town	Sheffield Wednesday	Free
2 February 2026	Luca Netz	Borussia Mönchengladbach	Nottingham Forest	Undisclosed
2 February 2026	Joel Philbert	Chelsea	Tottenham Hotspur	Undisclosed
2 February 2026	Joe Quigley	Oldham Athletic	Bristol Rovers	Undisclosed
2 February 2026	Patrick Roberts	Sunderland	Birmingham City	Undisclosed
2 February 2026	Tyler Roberts	Birmingham City	Mansfield Town	Undisclosed
2 February 2026	Joe Rothwell	Rangers	Sheffield United	Undisclosed
2 February 2026	Sverre Sandal	KFUM	Luton Town	Undisclosed
2 February 2026	Collins Sichenje	Vojvodina	Charlton Athletic	Undisclosed
2 February 2026	Moussa Sissoko	Watford	Panathinaikos	Undisclosed
2 February 2026	Jørgen Strand Larsen	Wolverhampton Wanderers	Crystal Palace	£48m
2 February 2026	Nik Tzanev	Newport County	Huddersfield Town	Undisclosed
2 February 2026	André Vidigal	Stoke City	Wycombe Wanderers	Free
2 February 2026	Sam Waller	Burnley	Harrogate Town	Undisclosed
2 February 2026	Duncan Watmore	Unattached	Rotherham United	Free

== Loans ==
Start date	End date	Player	Moving from	Moving to
2 September 2025	30 June 2026	Matt O'Riley	Brighton & Hove Albion	Marseille
3 September 2025	30 June 2026	Kiano Dyer	Chelsea	Volendam
3 September 2025	30 June 2026	Nazariy Rusyn	Sunderland	Arka Gdynia
4 September 2025	30 June 2026	Kenzo Goudmijn	Derby County	Go Ahead Eagles
5 September 2025	30 June 2026	Milan Aleksić	Sunderland	Cracovia
5 September 2025	30 June 2026	Saša Kalajdžić	Wolverhampton Wanderers	LASK
7 September 2025	30 June 2026	Marselino Ferdinan	Oxford United	Trenčín
7 September 2025	30 June 2026	Josh Wilson-Esbrand	Manchester City	Radomiak Radom
11 September 2025	30 June 2026	André Onana	Manchester United	Trabzonspor
12 September 2025	30 June 2026	Tom Dele-Bashiru	Watford	Gençlerbirliği
12 September 2025	30 June 2026	Jesurun Rak-Sakyi	Crystal Palace	Çaykur Rizespor
12 September 2025	30 June 2026	Jota Silva	Nottingham Forest	Beşiktaş
13 September 2025	30 June 2026	David Datro Fofana	Chelsea	Fatih Karagümrük
20 September 2025	1 January 2026	Jeremiah Berkeley-Agyepong	Chelsea	Ipswich Town
21 October 2025	28 October 2025	Joe Lumley	Bristol City	Sheffield Wednesday
12 November 2025	31 December 2025	Ted Curd	Chelsea	Boreham Wood
20 November 2025	27 November 2025	Richard O'Donnell	Derby County	Grimsby Town
20 December 2025	27 December 2025	Jackson Smith	Barnsley	Grimsby Town
1 January 2026	30 June 2026	Iwan Morgan	Brentford	Shrewsbury Town
2 January 2026	30 June 2026	Tobi Adeyemo	Watford	Crawley Town
2 January 2026	30 June 2026	Julián Araujo	Bournemouth	Celtic
2 January 2026	30 June 2026	Jamie Donley	Tottenham Hotspur	Oxford United
2 January 2026	30 June 2026	Niclas Füllkrug	West Ham United	Milan
2 January 2026	30 June 2026	Michael Olakigbe	Brentford	Swindon Town
2 January 2026	30 June 2026	Louie Sibley	Oxford United	Bradford City
2 January 2026	30 June 2026	Manor Solomon	Tottenham Hotspur	Fiorentina
2 January 2026	30 June 2026	Kōta Takai	Tottenham Hotspur	Borussia Mönchengladbach
3 January 2026	30 June 2026	Harrison Biggins	Shrewsbury Town	Newport County
3 January 2026	30 June 2026	Aidan Borland	Aston Villa	Swindon Town
3 January 2026	30 June 2026	Alfie Pond	Wolverhampton Wanderers	Crewe Alexandra
4 January 2026	30 June 2026	Sammy Braybrooke	Leicester City	Chesterfield
4 January 2026	30 June 2026	Sam Curtis	Sheffield United	Chesterfield
4 January 2026	30 June 2026	Sil Swinkels	Aston Villa	Chesterfield
6 January 2026	30 June 2026	Eiran Cashin	Brighton & Hove Albion	Blackburn Rovers
6 January 2026	30 June 2026	Yang Min-hyeok	Tottenham Hotspur	Coventry City
6 January 2026	30 June 2026	Lasse Nordås	Luton Town	Heerenveen
6 January 2026	30 June 2026	Francis Okoronkwo	Everton	Doncaster Rovers
6 January 2026	30 June 2026	Jahmai Simpson-Pusey	Manchester City	1. FC Köln
6 January 2026	30 June 2026	Josh Stokes	Bristol City	Stockport County
7 January 2026	30 June 2026	Damion Downs	Southampton	Hamburger SV
7 January 2026	30 June 2026	Romain Esse	Crystal Palace	Coventry City
7 January 2026	30 June 2026	Arnaud Kalimuendo	Nottingham Forest	Eintracht Frankfurt
7 January 2026	30 June 2026	Callum Marshall	West Ham United	VfL Bochum
7 January 2026	30 June 2026	Olly Thomas	Bristol City	Dunfermline Athletic
8 January 2026	30 June 2026	Freddie Anderson	Stoke City	Barrow
8 January 2026	30 June 2026	Ki-Jana Hoever	Wolverhampton Wanderers	Sheffield United
8 January 2026	30 June 2026	Oliver Irow	Tottenham Hotspur	Mansfield Town
8 January 2026	30 June 2026	Jon Russell	Barnsley	Mansfield Town
8 January 2026	30 June 2026	Daniel Peretz	Bayern Munich	Southampton
9 January 2026	30 June 2026	Louie Copley	Arsenal	Crawley Town
9 January 2026	30 June 2026	George Earthy	West Ham United	Bristol City
9 January 2026	30 June 2026	Emilio Lawrence	Manchester City	Luton Town
9 January 2026	30 June 2026	Klaidi Lolos	Peterborough United	Crawley Town
9 January 2026	30 June 2026	Trey Ogunsuyi	Sunderland	Shrewsbury Town
9 January 2026	30 June 2026	Myles Peart-Harris	Brentford	Oxford United
9 January 2026	30 June 2026	Tyrell Sellars-Fleming	Hull City	Grimsby Town
10 January 2026	30 June 2026	Zander Clark	Heart of Midlothian	Doncaster Rovers
12 January 2026	30 June 2026	Kofi Balmer	Motherwell	Bristol Rovers
12 January 2026	30 June 2026	Harry Clarke	Ipswich Town	Charlton Athletic
12 January 2026	30 June 2026	Andy Cook	Bradford City	Grimsby Town
12 January 2026	30 June 2026	Henry Gray	Ipswich Town	Harrogate Town
13 January 2026	30 June 2026	Emile Acquah	Dundee	Harrogate Town
13 January 2026	30 June 2026	Harrison Ashby	Newcastle United	Bradford City
13 January 2026	30 June 2026	Gavin Bazunu	Southampton	Stoke City
13 January 2026	30 June 2026	Wout Faes	Leicester City	Monaco
13 January 2026	30 June 2026	Joe White	Newcastle United	Bradford City
14 January 2026	30 June 2026	Millenic Alli	Luton Town	Portsmouth
14 January 2026	30 June 2026	Kamarl Grant	Millwall	Blackpool
14 January 2026	30 June 2026	Harry Gray	Leeds United	Rotherham United
14 January 2026	30 June 2026	Will Keane	Preston North End	Reading
15 January 2026	30 June 2026	Damola Ajayi	Tottenham Hotpsur	Bromley
15 January 2026	30 June 2026	Facundo Buonanotte	Brighton & Hove Albion	Leeds United
15 January 2026	30 June 2026	Matthew Cox	Brentford	Shrewsbury Town
15 January 2026	30 June 2026	Ryan Delaney	Swindon Town	Newport County
15 January 2026	30 June 2026	Owen Goodman	Crystal Palace	Barnsley
15 January 2026	30 June 2026	Dylan Jones	Norwich City	Tranmere Rovers
15 January 2026	30 June 2026	Yunus Emre Konak	Brentford	Oxford United
15 January 2026	30 June 2026	Kacper Łopata	Barnsley	Walsall
15 January 2026	30 June 2026	Aaron Loupalo-Bi	Fulham	Walsall
15 January 2026	30 June 2026	Josh Powell	Nottingham Forest	Fleetwood Town
15 January 2026	30 June 2026	Joe Taylor	Huddersfield Town	Wigan Athletic
16 January 2026	30 June 2026	Kaelan Casey	West Ham United	Leyton Orient
16 January 2026	30 June 2026	Romain Faivre	Bournemouth	Auxerre
16 January 2026	30 June 2026	Donyell Malen	Aston Villa	Roma
16 January 2026	30 June 2026	Ajay Matthews	Millwall	Leyton Orient
16 January 2026	30 June 2026	Marshall Munetsi	Wolverhampton Wanderers	Paris FC
16 January 2026	30 June 2026	William Tamen	Everton	Tranmere Rovers
16 January 2026	30 June 2026	Kane Thompson-Sommers	Milton Keynes Dons	Bristol Rovers
16 January 2026	30 June 2026	Timur Tutierov	Sunderland	Exeter City
17 January 2026	30 June 2026	Harry Cornick	Bristol City	Stevenage
17 January 2026	30 June 2026	Jhon Solís	Girona	Birmingham City
18 January 2026	30 June 2026	Claudio Echeverri	Manchester City	Girona
19 January 2026	30 June 2026	Luke Harris	Fulham	Wycombe Wanderers
19 January 2026	30 June 2026	Jack Harrison	Leeds United	Fiorentina
19 January 2026	30 June 2026	Yū Hirakawa	Bristol City	Hull City
19 January 2026	30 June 2026	Alfie Lloyd	Queens Park Rangers	Lincoln City
19 January 2026	30 June 2026	Ibrahim Osman	Brighton & Hove Albion	Birmingham City
19 January 2026	30 June 2026	Joel Randall	Bolton Wanderers	Blackpool
20 January 2026	30 June 2026	Phillip Chinedu	Leyton Orient	Barnet
20 January 2026	30 June 2026	Diallang Jaiyesimi	Leyton Orient	Barnet
20 January 2026	30 June 2026	Owen Moxon	Stockport County	Wigan Athletic
20 January 2026	30 June 2026	James Tilley	Wycombe Wanderers	AFC Wimbledon
21 January 2026	30 June 2026	Travis Akomeah	Watford	Gillingham
21 January 2026	30 June 2026	Ethon Archer	Luton Town	Port Vale
21 January 2026	30 June 2026	Luke Chambers	Liverpool	Charlton Athletic
21 January 2026	30 June 2026	Ronan Darcy	Wigan Athletic	Crawley Town
21 January 2026	30 June 2026	Cole Deeming	West Bromwich Albion	Cheltenham Town
21 January 2026	30 June 2026	Ryan Nyambe	Derby County	Reading
21 January 2026	30 June 2026	Michael Obafemi	Burnley	Blackpool
22 January 2026	30 June 2026	Yusuf Akhamrich	Tottenham Hotspur	Bristol Rovers
22 January 2026	30 June 2026	Luke Butterfield	Chesterfield	Accrington Stanley
22 January 2026	30 June 2026	Keiber Lamadrid	Deportivo La Guaira	West Ham United
22 January 2026	30 June 2026	Gustavo Nunes	Brentford	Swansea City
22 January 2026	30 June 2026	Kasey Palmer	Hull City	Luton Town
23 January 2026	30 June 2026	Jacob Chapman	Huddersfield Town	Crawley Town
23 January 2026	30 June 2026	Roman Dixon	Everton	Stockport County
23 January 2026	30 June 2026	Lorenzo Lucca	Napoli	Nottingham Forest
23 January 2026	30 June 2026	Elliott Nevitt	Gillingham	Cambridge United
23 January 2026	30 June 2026	Ethan Nwaneri	Arsenal	Marseille
23 January 2026	30 June 2026	Temple Ojinnaka	Wolverhampton Wanderers	Shrewsbury Town
23 January 2026	30 June 2026	Emmerson Sutton	Queens Park Rangers	Harrogate Town
23 January 2026	30 June 2026	Nils Zätterström	Sheffield United	Genoa
24 January 2026	30 June 2026	Harry Amass	Manchester United	Norwich City
25 January 2026	30 June 2026	Milan Smit	Go Ahead Eagles	Stoke City
26 January 2026	30 June 2026	Scott Banks	FC St. Pauli	Barnsley
26 January 2026	30 June 2026	Neill Byrne	Bradford City	Doncaster Rovers
26 January 2026	30 June 2026	Andy Cannon	Wrexham	Burton Albion
26 January 2026	30 June 2026	Harald Nilsen Tangen	Sarpsborg 08	Notts County
27 January 2026	30 June 2026	Corey Blackett-Taylor	Derby County	Bolton Wanderers
27 January 2026	30 June 2026	Josh Davison	Tranmere Rovers	Cheltenham Town
27 January 2026	30 June 2026	Jake Evans	Leicester City	Northampton Town
27 January 2026	30 June 2026	Dan Neil	Sunderland	Ipswich Town
27 January 2026	30 June 2026	Christos Mandas	Lazio	Bournemouth
27 January 2026	30 June 2026	Jeremy Sarmiento	Brighton & Hove Albion	Middlesbrough
28 January 2026	30 June 2026	Rob Apter	Charlton Athletic	Bolton Wanderers
28 January 2026	30 June 2026	Jayden Fevrier	Stockport County	Charlton Athletic
28 January 2026	30 June 2026	Douglas Luiz	Juventus	Aston Villa
28 January 2026	30 June 2026	Ryan Oné	Sheffield United	Lincoln City
28 January 2026	30 June 2026	Yasin Özcan	Aston Villa	Beşiktaş
29 January 2026	30 June 2026	Aji Alese	Sunderland	Portsmouth
29 January 2026	30 June 2026	Jaydon Banel	Burnley	Derby County
29 January 2026	30 June 2026	Delano Burgzorg	Middlesbrough	Bristol City
29 January 2026	30 June 2026	Conor Coady	Wrexham	Charlton Athletic
29 January 2026	30 June 2026	Diego Coppola	Brighton & Hove Albion	Paris FC
29 January 2026	30 June 2026	Jovan Malcolm	Stevenage	Barrow
29 January 2026	30 June 2026	Zech Medley	Fleetwood Town	Bromley
29 January 2026	30 June 2026	Isaac Olaofe	Charlton Athletic	Stockport County
29 January 2026	30 June 2026	Brandon Powell	Blackburn Rovers	Barrow
30 January 2026	30 June 2026	David Abimbola	Bolton Wanderers	Accrington Stanley
30 January 2026	30 June 2026	Daniel Bachmann	Watford	Leyton Orient
30 January 2026	30 June 2026	Fin Barbrook	Ipswich Town	Colchester United
30 January 2026	30 June 2026	Tawanda Chirewa	Wolverhampton Wanderers	Barnsley
30 January 2026	30 June 2026	Toby Collyer	Manchester United	Hull City
30 January 2026	30 June 2026	Jesse Debrah	Port Vale	Bromley
30 January 2026	30 June 2026	Enis Destan	Hull City	Westerlo
30 January 2026	30 June 2026	Evann Guessand	Aston Villa	Crystal Palace
30 January 2026	30 June 2026	Danny Imray	Crystal Palace	West Bromwich Albion
30 January 2026	30 June 2026	Fábio Jaló	Barnsley	Oldham Athletic
30 January 2026	30 June 2026	Abdoulaye Kanté	Middlesbrough	Saint-Étienne
30 January 2026	30 June 2026	Lewis Koumas	Liverpool	Hull City
30 January 2026	30 June 2026	Nathan Lowe	Stoke City	Wycombe Wanderers
30 January 2026	30 June 2026	Miloš Luković	Strasbourg	Preston North End
30 January 2026	30 June 2026	Stephen Mfuni	Manchester City	Watford
30 January 2026	30 June 2026	Paul Mullin	Wrexham	Bradford City
30 January 2026	31 December 2026	Kendry Páez	Chelsea	River Plate
30 January 2026	30 June 2026	Jack Thompson	Nottingham Forest	Barrow
30 January 2026	30 June 2026	Jerry Yates	Luton Town	Sheffield Wednesday
31 January 2026	30 June 2026	Christ Makosso	Luton Town	Oxford United
1 February 2026	30 June 2026	Tayo Adaramola	Crystal Palace	Sheffield Wednesday
1 February 2026	30 June 2026	Elijah Campbell	Everton	Port Vale
1 February 2026	30 June 2026	Anthony Patterson	Sunderland	Millwall
1 February 2026	30 June 2026	Calum Scanlon	Liverpool	Cardiff City
1 February 2026	30 June 2026	Martin Sherif	Everton	Port Vale
1 February 2026	30 June 2026	Tom Watson	Brighton & Hove Albion	Millwall
2 February 2026	30 June 2026	Simon Adingra	Sunderland	Monaco
2 February 2026	30 June 2026	Romeo Akachukwu	Southampton	Colchester United
2 February 2026	30 June 2026	Karoy Anderson	Charlton Athletic	Blackpool
2 February 2026	30 June 2026	Aarón Anselmino	Chelsea	Strasbourg
2 February 2026	30 June 2026	Joe Aribo	Southampton	Leicester City
2 February 2026	30 June 2026	Harry Ashfield	Wrexham	Cheltenham Town
2 February 2026	30 June 2026	Louie Barry	Aston Villa	Stockport County
2 February 2026	30 June 2026	Gabriele Biancheri	Manchester United	Rotherham United
2 February 2026	30 June 2026	Tom Bradshaw	Oxford United	Barnsley
2 February 2026	30 June 2026	Ben Broggio	Aston Villa	Falkirk
2 February 2026	30 June 2026	Tobias Brenan	Wigan Athletic	Harrogate Town
2 February 2026	30 June 2026	Jacob Brown	Luton Town	Portsmouth
2 February 2026	30 June 2026	Gustavo Caballero	Santos	Portsmouth
2 February 2026	30 June 2026	Mitch Clark	Port Vale	Fleetwood Town
2 February 2026	30 June 2026	Kamil Conteh	Bristol Rovers	Lincoln City
2 February 2026	30 June 2026	Max Dickov	Mansfield Town	Tranmere Rovers
2 February 2026	30 June 2026	Axel Disasi	Chelsea	West Ham United
2 February 2026	30 June 2026	Alfie Dorrington	Tottenham Hotspur	Salford City
2 February 2026	30 June 2026	Princewill Ehibhatiomhan	Southampton	Salford City
2 February 2026	30 June 2026	Mo Faal	Wrexham	Cheltenham Town
2 February 2026	30 June 2026	Sam Field	Queens Park Rangers	Norwich City
2 February 2026	30 June 2026	David Datro Fofana	Chelsea	Strasbourg
2 February 2026	30 June 2026	Tyrique George	Chelsea	Everton
2 February 2026	30 June 2026	Saba Goglichidze	Udinese	Watford
2 February 2026	30 June 2026	Angel Gomes	Marseille	Wolverhampton Wanderers
2 February 2026	30 June 2026	Brajan Gruda	Brighton & Hove Albion	RB Leipzig
2 February 2026	30 June 2026	Ben Hammond	Nottingham Forest	Northampton Town
2 February 2026	30 June 2026	Wes Harding	Millwall	Plymouth Argyle
2 February 2026	30 June 2026	Leo Hjelde	Sunderland	Sheffield United
2 February 2026	30 June 2026	Isaac Hutchinson	Bristol Rovers	Cheltenham Town
2 February 2026	30 June 2026	Samuel Iling-Junior	Aston Villa	Pisa
2 February 2026	30 June 2026	Jamaldeen Jimoh-Aloba	Aston Villa	West Bromwich Albion
2 February 2026	30 June 2026	Herbie Kane	Huddersfield Town	Plymouth Argyle
2 February 2026	30 June 2026	Johnny Kenny	Celtic	Bolton Wanderers
2 February 2026	30 June 2026	Juan Larios	Southampton	Zaragoza
2 February 2026	30 June 2026	Elliot Lee	Wrexham	Doncaster Rovers
2 February 2026	30 June 2026	Tommy Leigh	Bradford City	Bristol City
2 February 2026	30 June 2026	Kyle McAdam	Nottingham Forest	Northampton Town
2 February 2026	30 June 2026	Andrew Moran	Brighton & Hove Albion	Preston North End
2 February 2026	30 June 2026	Hindolo Mustapha	Crystal Palace	West Bromwich Albion
2 February 2026	30 June 2026	Joel Ndala	Manchester City	Sheffield Wednesday
2 February 2026	30 June 2026	Stephan Negru	Oxford United	Tranmere Rovers
2 February 2026	30 June 2026	Zach Obiero	Leyton Orient	Tranmere Rovers
2 February 2026	30 June 2026	Jid Okeke	Stockport County	Walsall
2 February 2026	30 June 2026	Frank Onyeka	Brentford	Coventry City
2 February 2026	30 June 2026	Esapa Osong	Nottingham Forest	Fleetwood Town
2 February 2026	30 June 2026	Jonathan Panzo	Rio Ave	Birmingham City
2 February 2026	30 June 2026	Kalvin Phillips	Manchester City	Sheffield United
2 February 2026	30 June 2026	Sean Raggett	Rotherham United	Cambridge United
2 February 2026	30 June 2026	Jesurun Rak-Sakyi	Crystal Palace	Stoke City
2 February 2026	30 June 2026	Dujuan Richards	Chelsea	Leicester City
2 February 2026	30 June 2026	Ruben Roosken	Huddersfield Town	Oxford United
2 February 2026	30 June 2026	Frankie Runham	Chelsea	Ipswich Town
2 February 2026	30 June 2026	James Scanlon	Manchester United	Swindon Town
2 February 2026	30 June 2026	Charlie Setford	Ajax	Milton Keynes Dons
2 February 2026	30 June 2026	Richard Smallwood	Tranmere Rovers	Bristol Rovers
2 February 2026	30 June 2026	Lino Sousa	Aston Villa	Rotherham United
2 February 2026	30 June 2026	Sven Sprangler	St Johnstone	Newport County
2 February 2026	30 June 2026	Layton Stewart	Thun	AFC Wimbledon
2 February 2026	30 June 2026	Sammie Szmodics	Ipswich Town	Derby County
2 February 2026	30 June 2026	Davy van den Berg	Utrecht	Luton Town
2 February 2026	30 June 2026	Caylan Vickers	Brighton & Hove Albion	Wigan Athletic
2 February 2026	30 June 2026	Bobby Wales	Swansea City	Huddersfield Town
2 February 2026	30 June 2026	Leo Walta	IK Sirius	Swansea City
2 February 2026	30 June 2026	Reuell Walters	Luton Town	Blackpool
2 February 2026	30 June 2026	Ethan Wheatley	Manchester United	Bradford City
2 February 2026	30 June 2026	Joseph Wheeler-Henry	Chelsea	Brentford
2 February 2026	30 June 2026	Joe Wildsmith	West Bromwich Albion	Middlesbrough
2 February 2026	30 June 2026	James Wilson	Heart of Midlothian	Tottenham Hotspur
2 February 2026	30 June 2026	Kadan Young	Aston Villa	Reading
