= List of Albania international footballers born outside Albania =

This is a list of Albania international footballers who were born outside Albania. Players born in countries outside Albania including those born in diaspora may qualify for the Albania team through Albanian parents or grandparents, or through residency in Albania and subsequent naturalisation as Albanian citizens.

In the Treaty of London (1913) the newly Independent Albania left territories in neighbouring countries with substantial Albanian minorities. As mentioned above, the Republic of Albania and the Albanian Football Association opened their ways to footballers of Albanian descent even born outside the territories. In fact the first footballer born outside Albania to represent the national side was Italian ethnic goalkeeper Giacomo Poselli which was born in Greece and debuted in the 1946 Balkan Cup a competition which Albania won. Instead the first Albanian origin footballer was fellow goalkeeper Arjan Beqaj born in Prizren of Kosovo, which at the time was playing for Albanian Superliga competers Partizani Tirana and managed his debut in 1998. It was succeeded by fellow Kosovan born Besnik Hasi two years later and by another Kosovan origin Lorik Cana after another two years, as both midfielders became captains subsequently during their last years and Cana himself holds the record for most appearances with a tally of 93. All 4 upcomers were managed by German coach Hans-Peter Briegel in his arrival in 2003, which himself managed another upcomings especially from his country's championship Bundesliga bringing 3 components Mehmet Dragusha in 2003 and Bekim Kastrati & Besart Berisha in 2006, but also the duo of Ukrainian side Vorskla Poltava defenders Armend Dallku and Debatik Curri.

== List of players ==
- Players with flags in front of their name are players who represented Albania, but now represent another national team.
- A light red background indicates the most recent match.

Key
*	Current internationals
Caps	Appearances
Pos	Positions
GK	Goalkeeper
DF	Defender
MF	Midfielder
FW	Forward

=== Capped players ===
As of 13 November 2026

Name	Place of birth	Origin	Pos.	Caps	Goals	First cap	Last cap	Ref
Lorik Cana	(Socialist Federal Republic of Yugoslavia) (Kosovo) Prishtina	Gjakova	DF	93	1	2003	2016	
Etrit Berisha	(Socialist Federal Republic of Yugoslavia) (Kosovo) Prishtina	Prishtina	GK	84	0	2012	2026*	
Berat Djimsiti	(Switzerland) Zürich	Bujanoc	DF	77	1	2015	2026*	
Armend Dallku	(Socialist Federal Republic of Yugoslavia) (Kosovo) Vushtrri	Vushtrri	DF	64	1	2005	2013	
Ylber Ramadani	(Germany) Starnberg	Shtime	MF	54	1	2018	2026*	
Ardian Ismajli	(Serbia and Montenegro) (Kosovo) Majac	Majac	DF	52	3	2018	2026*	
Amir Abrashi	(Switzerland) Bischofszell	Gjakova	MF	51	1	2013	2024*	
Mërgim Mavraj	(Germany) Hanau	Istog	DF	50	3	2012	2019	
Thomas Strakosha	(Greece) Athens	Memaliaj	GK	47	0	2017	2026*	
Ermir Lenjani	(Socialist Federal Republic of Yugoslavia) (Kosovo) Gjilan	Gjilan	MF	45	5	2013	2022*	
Frédéric Veseli	(Switzerland) Renens	Prizren	DF	45	0	2015	2023*	
Nedim Bajrami	(Switzerland) Zürich	Tetovë	MF	45	7	2021	2026*	
Debatik Curri	(Socialist Federal Republic of Yugoslavia) (Kosovo) Prishtina	Prishtina	DF	44	1	2006	2014	
Arjan Beqaj	(Socialist Federal Republic of Yugoslavia) (Kosovo) Prizren	Prizren	GK	43	0	1998	2011	
(Kosovo) Besnik Hasi	(Socialist Federal Republic of Yugoslavia) (Kosovo) Gjakova	Gjakova	MF	43	2	2000	2007	
Arlind Ajeti	(Switzerland) Basel	Podujevë	DF	41	1	2014	2026*	
Mario Mitaj	(Greece) Athens	Vermosh	DF	38	0	2021	2026*	
Armando Broja	(England) Slough	Koplik	FW	37	7	2020	2026*	
Migjen Basha	(Switzerland) Lausanne	Suharekë	MF	34	3	2013	2019	
Taulant Xhaka	(Switzerland) Basel	Podujevë	MF	31	1	2014	2019*	
Arbër Hoxha	(Germany) Heidelberg	Istog	FW	30	2	2024	2026*	
Taulant Seferi	(North Macedonia) Kumanovë	Kumanovë	MF	28	3	2019	2026*	
Burim Kukeli	(Socialist Federal Republic of Yugoslavia) (Kosovo) Gjakova	Gjakova	MF	27	0	2012	2017	
Marash Kumbulla	(Italy) Peschiera del Garda	Shkodër	DF	27	0	2019	2026*	
Jasir Asani	(North Macedonia) Shkupi	Shkupi	FW	26	6	2023	2026*	
Iván Balliu	(Spain) Caldes de Malavella	Tirana	DF	24	0	2017	2026*	
Enea Mihaj	(Greece) Rhodes	Pogradec	DF	21	0	2018	2025*	
Mirlind Daku	(Serbia and Montenegro) (Kosovo) Përlepnicë	Përlepnicë	FW	21	1	2023	2026*	
(Kosovo) Samir Ujkani	(Socialist Federal Republic of Yugoslavia) (Kosovo) Vushtrri	Vushtrri	GK	20	0	2009	2013	
Naser Aliji	(North Macedonia) Kumanovë	Kumanovë	DF	19	0	2015	2025*	
(Kosovo) Besart Berisha	(Socialist Federal Republic of Yugoslavia) (Kosovo) Prishtina	Prishtina	FW	17	1	2006	2009	
Shkëlzen Gashi	(Switzerland) Zürich	Klina	FW	17	1	2013	2016*	
Valdet Rama	(Socialist Federal Republic of Yugoslavia) (Kosovo) Mitrovica	Mitrovica	MF	15	3	2013	2015	
Eros Grezda	(Serbia and Montenegro) (Kosovo) Gjakova	Gjakova	MF	13	1	2017	2019*	
Kastriot Dermaku	(Italy) Scandiano	Kamenicë	DF	13	1	2018	2021*	
Mehmet Dragusha	(Socialist Federal Republic of Yugoslavia) (Kosovo) Prishtina	Prishtina	MF	11	1	2003	2005	
Anis Mehmeti	(England) Islington	Burrel	MF	9	1	2023	2026*	
Ahmed Januzi	(Socialist Federal Republic of Yugoslavia) (Kosovo) Vushtrri	Vushtrri	FW	8	0	2010	2013	
Adrion Pajaziti	(England) London	Vushtrri	MF	8	0	2025	2026*	
Giacomo Poselli	(Greece) Thessaloniki	Vlorë (by naturalization) (Note: Ethnic Italian who was naturalised as an Albanian citizen during his time with Flamurtari Vlorë.)	GK	7	0	1946	1948	
(Kosovo) Alban Meha	(Socialist Federal Republic of Yugoslavia) (Kosovo) Mitrovica	Skënderaj	MF	7	2	2012	2015	
(Kosovo) Herolind Shala	(Norway) Porsgrunn	Drenas	MF	6	0	2014	2016	
Azdren Llullaku	(Socialist Federal Republic of Yugoslavia) (Kosovo) Istog	Istog	FW	6	0	2016	2017*	
Emanuele Ndoj	(Italy) Catania	Rubik	MF	6	1	2018	2019*	
Giacomo Vrioni	(Italy) San Severino Marche	Vlorë	FW	6	0	2018	2022*	
Arbnor Muçolli	(Denmark) Fredericia	Podujevë	MF	6	0	2022	2024*	
Stavros Pilios	(Greece) Rhodes	Dropull	DF	6	0	2026	2026*	
Liridon Latifi	(Serbia and Montenegro) (Kosovo) Prishtina	Prishtina	MF	5	0	2017	2017*	
Egzon Binaku	(Sweden) Åmål	Mitrovica	DF	5	0	2018	2018*	
Arbnor Muja	(Serbia and Montenegro) (Kosovo) Mitrovica	Mitrovica	FW	5	0	2023	2023*	
Kamer Qaka	(Serbia and Montenegro) (Kosovo) Peja	Peja	MF	4	0	2017	2018*	
Lindon Selahi	(Belgium) Namur	Kumanovë	MF	4	0	2019	2020*	
Marvin Çuni	(Germany) Freising	Peja	FW	4	0	2023	2023*	
Medon Berisha	(Switzerland) Münsingen	Kaçanik	MF	4	0	2024	2025*	
Cristian Shpendi	(Italy) Ancona	Pukë	FW	4	0	2025	2026*	
Blerim Rrustemi	(Socialist Federal Republic of Yugoslavia) (Kosovo) Vushtrri	Vushtrri	DF	3	0	2007	2007	
Agon Mehmeti	(Socialist Federal Republic of Yugoslavia) (Kosovo) Podujevë	Podujevë	MF	3	0	2013	2013	
Enis Gavazaj	(Serbia and Montenegro) (Kosovo) Prizren	Prizren	FW	3	0	2018	2018*	
(Switzerland) Adrian Bajrami	(Switzerland) Langenthal	Ohër	DF	3	0	2022	2022	
Luis Hasa	(Italy) Sora	Peqin	MF	3	0	2026	2026*	
Bekim Kastrati	(Socialist Federal Republic of Yugoslavia) (Kosovo) Peja	Peja	FW	2	0	2006	2006	
(Kosovo) Fidan Aliti	(Switzerland) Binningen	Preshevë	DF	2	0	2014	2014	
(Kosovo) Amir Rrahmani	(Serbia and Montenegro) (Kosovo) Pristina	Skënderaj	DF	2	1	2014	2015	
(Kosovo) Milot Rashica	(Serbia and Montenegro) (Kosovo) Vushtrri	Vushtrri	MF	2	0	2016	2016	
Valon Ahmedi	(North Macedonia) Ohër	Ohër	MF	2	0	2017	2017*	
Bujar Lika	(Serbia and Montenegro) (Kosovo) Ferizaj	Ferizaj	MF	2	0	2018	2018*	
Herdi Prenga	(Croatia) Zadar	Mirditë	DF	2	0	2018	2018*	
Stivian Janku	(Greece) Ioannina	Delvinë	DF	2	0	2022	2022*	
Bujar Pllana	(Serbia and Montenegro) (Kosovo) Mitrovica	Mitrovica	DF	2	0	2026	2026*	
Agonit Sallaj	(Socialist Federal Republic of Yugoslavia) (Kosovo) Gjakova	Gjakova	DF	1	0	2011	2011	
(Kosovo) Mërgim Brahimi	(Serbia and Montenegro) (Kosovo) Istog	Istog	MF	1	0	2012	2012	
Vullnet Basha	(Switzerland) Lausanne	Suharekë	MF	1	0	2013	2013	
Arbnor Fejzullahu	(Serbia and Montenegro) (Serbia) Preshevë	Preshevë	DF	1	0	2015	2015	
Astrit Ajdarević	(Socialist Federal Republic of Yugoslavia) (Kosovo) Prishtina	Medvegjë	MF	1	0	2017	2017*	
Ramën Çepele	(Italy) Conegliano	Fier	DF	1	0	2020	2020*	
Esat Mala	(Serbia and Montenegro) (Kosovo) Prizren	Prizren	MF	1	0	2022	2022*	
Ardit Toli	(Greece) Ioannina	Lushnjë	DF	1	0	2022	2022*	
Sebastjan Spahiu	(Belgium) Mouscron	Shkodër	MF	1	0	2024	2024*	
Maldini Kacurri	(England) Lewisham	Lezhë	DF	1	0	2025	2025*	
Samuele Sina	(Italy) Iseo	Lushnjë	DF	1	0	2026	2026*	

=== By country of birth ===
Country	Total
Kosovo (Note: Kosovo as part of Yugoslavia and Serbia and Montenegro at the time the players were born.)	33
Switzerland	12
Italy	8
Greece	7
England	4
Germany	4
North Macedonia	4
Belgium	2
Croatia	1
Denmark	1
Norway	1
Serbia (Note: Serbia as part of Serbia and Montenegro at the time the player was born and excluding the part when Kosovo was part of Serbia before 2006.)	1
Spain	1
Sweden	1
