= Fin Cartwright =

English footballer

Personal information
- Full name: Finlay James Cartwright
- Date of birth: 28 February 2007 (age 19)
- Place of birth: Redcar, England
- Position: Midfielder

Team information
- Current team: Grimsby Town (on loan from Middlesbrough)
- Number: 28

Youth career
- 2013–2023: Middlesbrough

Senior career*
Years	Team	Apps	(Gls)
2023–	Middlesbrough	0	(0)
2026–	→ Grimsby Town (loan)	10	(1)

International career^{‡}
2022–2023	England U16	4	(0)
2023	England U17	5	(0)
- * Club domestic league appearances and goals as of 10:09, 10 November 2026 (UTC) ‡ National team caps and goals as of 13:42, 1 October 2024 (UTC)

Finlay James Cartwright (born 28 February 2007) is an English professional footballer who plays as a midfielder for EFL League Two side Grimsby Town, on loan from EFL Championship side Middlesbrough.

== Club career ==
=== Middlesbrough ===
Cartwright joined the youth academy of Middlesbrough at the age of 6, and worked his way up their youth categories. He made his senior and professional debut with Middlesbrough as a late substitute in a 3–2 EFL Cup win over Huddersfield Town on 8 August 2023. At 16 years and 161 days old, he was the second youngest debutant in the history of Middlesbrough in a competitive match.

==== Grimsby Town (loan) ====
On 1 September 2026, Cartwright joined EFL League Two club Grimsby Town on a season-long loan. He made his debut four days later, replacing Sonny Finch during the second half of a 2–2 league draw away to Cheltenham Town. Cartwright scored his first goal for Grimsby on 3 October, heading in a cross from Iwan Morgan after coming on as a substitute in a 2–1 home defeat against Shrewsbury Town.

== International career ==
Cartwright is a youth international for England, having been called up to the England U17s for a set of friendlies in September 2023.

== Career statistics ==
As of match played 8 November 2026

Appearances and goals by club, season and competition
Club	Season	League			FA Cup		League Cup		Other		Total	
Club	Season	Division	Apps	Goals	Apps	Goals	Apps	Goals	Apps	Goals	Apps	Goals
Middlesbrough	2023–24	Championship	0	0	0	0	1	0	0	0	1	0
Middlesbrough	2024–25	Championship	0	0	0	0	0	0	0	0	0	0
Middlesbrough	2025–26	Championship	0	0	0	0	0	0	0	0	0	0
Middlesbrough	2026–27	Championship	0	0	0	0	1	0	0	0	1	0
Middlesbrough	Total		0	0	0	0	2	0	0	0	2	0
Grimsby Town (loan)	2026–27	League Two	10	1	1	0	0	0	2 (Note: Appearance(s) in EFL Trophy)	0	13	1
Career total			10	1	1	0	2	0	2	0	15	1
