= Sonny Finch =

English footballer (born 2005)

Personal information
- Full name: Sonny Finch
- Date of birth: 5 August 2005 (age 21)
- Place of birth: Houghton-le-Spring, England
- Position: Forward

Team information
- Current team: Grimsby Town
- Number: 10

Youth career
- 2018–2022: Middlesbrough

Senior career*
Years	Team	Apps	(Gls)
2022–2026	Middlesbrough	3	(0)
2024–2025	→ Milton Keynes Dons (loan)	6	(1)
2026	→ South Shields (loan)	14	(6)
2026	South Shields	7	(1)
2026–	Grimsby Town	11	(1)

International career^{‡}
2021–2022	England U17	7	(0)
2023	England U18	3	(1)
- * Club domestic league appearances and goals as of 13:10, 31 October 2026 (UTC) ‡ National team caps and goals as of 15:39, 2 January 2025 (UTC)

Sonny Finch (born 5 August 2005) is an English professional footballer who plays as a forward for EFL League Two club Grimsby Town.

== Club career ==
=== Middlesbrough ===
Finch signed his first professional contract with Middlesbrough shortly after his seventeenth birthday, in August 2022. He had been with the club since under-13 level. He had travelled with the first team squad for pre-season training in Portugal and impressed.

Finch made his professional club debut in the EFL Cup starting in a 1–0 defeat at home at the Riverside Stadium to Barnsley on 10 August 2022.

On 30 August 2024, Finch joined EFL League Two club Milton Keynes Dons on a season-long loan. He made his debut for the club on 2 August 2024 as a 61st-minute substitute in a 1–0 defeat away to Salford City, however was later substituted himself in second-half added time due to injury. Whilst on loan, Finch scored his first senior professional goal on 1 October 2024, in a 5–1 away win over Harrogate Town.

=== South Shields ===
On 13 January 2026, Finch joined National League North club South Shields on loan for the remainder of the season. On 27 March 2026, he joined the club permanently on a two-and-a-half year deal.

=== Grimsby Town ===
On 24 August 2026, it was announced that Finch had signed for EFL League Two side Grimsby Town, on a three-year deal for an undisclosed fee.

Finch made his Grimsby debut on 29 August, replacing Justin Amaluzor at half-time in a 2–2 home draw with Fleetwood Town. He made his first start for the club on 1 September in a 2–2 draw away to Accrington Stanley.

Finch scored his first Grimsby goal on 24 October, coming off the bench to complete a 4–1 away victory over Gillingham after receiving a through ball from Géza Dávid Turi.

== International career ==
In October 2021 Finch represented the England Under-17 team in qualifiers.

On 22 March 2023, Finch made his England U18 debut during a 2–1 win over Croatia in Medulin.

== Personal life ==
He is the son of former Darlington goalkeeper Keith Finch. He is a fan of Sunderland AFC.

== Career statistics ==
As of match played 31 October 2026

Appearances and goals by club, season and competition
Club	Season	League			FA Cup		League Cup		Other		Total	
Club	Season	Division	Apps	Goals	Apps	Goals	Apps	Goals	Apps	Goals	Apps	Goals
Middlesbrough	2022–23	Championship	2	0	0	0	1	0	0	0	3	0
Middlesbrough	2023–24	Championship	1	0	0	0	0	0	0	0	1	0
Middlesbrough	2024–25	Championship	0	0	0	0	1	0	0	0	1	0
Middlesbrough	Total		3	0	0	0	2	0	0	0	5	0
Milton Keynes Dons (loan)	2024–25	League Two	5	1	0	0	—		2 (Note: Appearance(s) in EFL Trophy)	0	7	1
South Shields (loan)	2025–26	National League North	14	6	0	0	—		0	0	14	6
South Shields	2025–26	National League North	7	1	0	0	—		2 (Note: Two appearances in National League North play-offs)	0	9	1
Grimsby Town	2026–27	League Two	11	1	0	0	0	0	2	0	13	1
Career total			40	9	0	0	2	0	6	0	48	9
