= Poselli =

Poselli is a surname. Notable people with the surname include:

- Giacomo Poselli (1922–2007), Albanian footballer
- Vitaliano Poselli (1840–1918), Italian architect
