= 2026–27 Grimsby Town F.C. season =

149th season in existence of Grimsby Town FC

Grimsby Town
2026–27 season
- Owner: 1878 Partners (63.1%), The Mariners Trust (13.5%), Other Shareholders (12.9%), Mike Parker (10.5%)
- Chairman: Andrew Pettit
- Manager: David Artell
- Stadium: Blundell Park
- EFL Cup: First Round
- EFL Trophy: Group Stage
- Top goalscorer: League: Iwan Morgan (5); All: Iwan Morgan (5)
- Highest home attendance: 8,257 vs Rotherham United (21 November 2026, EFL League Two)
- Lowest home attendance: 539 vs Burton Albion (6 October 2026, EFL Trophy)
- Average home league attendance: 7,442
- Biggest win: 5-2 vs York City (H) (31 October 2026, EFL League Two)
- Biggest defeat: 0-3 vs Nottingham Forest U21 (H) (10 November 2026, EFL Trophy)
Home colours	Away colours	Third colours

The 2026–27 season is the 149th season in the history of Grimsby Town Football Club and their fifth consecutive season in League Two. In addition to the domestic league, the club would also participate in the FA Cup, the EFL Cup, and the EFL Trophy.

== Transfers and contracts ==
=== In ===
Date	Pos.	Player	From	Fee	Ref.
17 June 2026	CB	Edon Pruti (ALB)	Sutton United (ENG)	Undisclosed	
1 July 2026 (Note: The transfer was announced on 19 June, and would become official on 1 July once Andrews' contract at Gillingham expired.)	CF	Josh Andrews (ENG)	Gillingham (ENG)	Free	
1 July 2026 (Note: The transfer was announced on 15 June, and would become official on 1 July once Cook's contract at Bradford City expired.)	CF	Andy Cook (ENG)	Bradford City (ENG)	Free	
1 July 2026 (Note: The transfer was announced on 16 June, and would become official on 1 July once Foulkes' contract at Kidderminster Harriers expired.)	RB	Joe Foulkes (ENG)	Kidderminster Harriers (ENG)	Free	
27 July 2026	CM	Cian Doyle (IRL)	Bray Wanderers (IRL)	Undisclosed	
7 August 2026	CF	Iwan Morgan (WAL)	Brentford (ENG)	Undisclosed	
24 August 2026	RW	Sonny Finch (ENG)	South Shields (ENG)	Undisclosed	

=== Out ===
Date	Pos.	Player	To	Fee	Ref.
11 July 2026	RW	Darragh Burns (IRL)	Derry City (NIR)	Undisclosed	
7 August 2026	ST	Jaze Kabia (IRL)	Leyton Orient (ENG)	Undisclosed	

=== Loaned in ===
Date	Pos.	Player	From	Loaned until	Ref.
28 July 2026	GK	Harvey Cartwright (ENG)	Hull City (ENG)	End of season	
14 August 2026	CM	Ryley Reynolds (ENG)	Notts County (ENG)	End of season	
1 September 2026	CM	Mark Shelton (ENG)	York City (ENG)	End of season	
1 September 2026	CM	Fin Cartwright (ENG)	Middlesbrough (ENG)	End of season	
5 September 2026	GK	David Harrington (IRL)	Bolton Wanderers (ENG)	19 September 2026 (Note: Harrington was signed on a 7-day emergency loan. On 11 September, Harrington's loan from Bolton Wanderers was extended by a further seven days.)	

=== Loaned out ===
Date	Pos.	Player	To	Date until	Ref.
10 August 2026	CB	Charlie Elliott (ENG)	Cleethorpes Town (ENG)	3 October 2026 (Note: On 8 September, Elliott's initial one-month loan was extended for a further month.)	
15 August 2026	CF	Elliot Smith (ENG)	Beverley Town (ENG)	7 November 2026 (Note: On 15 September, Smith's initial one-month loan was extended for a further month.) (Note: On 8 October, Smith's loan was again extended for a further month.)	
11 September 2026	CM	Henry Brown (ENG)	Cleethorpes Town (ENG)	11 October 2026	
25 September 2026	CB	Alex Graham (ENG)	Grimsby Borough (ENG)	21 November 2026 (Note: On 28 October, Graham's initial one-month loan was extended for a further month.)	
13 October 2026	CB	Sam Lavelle (SCO)	Hartlepool United (ENG)	7 December 2026 (Note: On 9 November, Lavelle's initial one-month loan was extended for a further 28 days.)	

=== Released / Out of Contract ===
Date	Pos.	Player	Subsequent club	Join date	Ref.
30 June 2026	RW	Jason Daði Svanþórsson (ISL)	KR Reykjavik (ISL)	1 July 2026	
30 June 2026	CAM	Zak Gilsenan (IRL)	FC Halifax Town (ENG)	6 July 2026	
30 June 2026	CAM	Evan Khouri (ENG)			
30 June 2026	CM	George McEachran (ENG)	Chesterfield (ENG)	1 July 2026	
30 June 2026	CF	Jude Soonsup-Bell (THA)	Port FC (THA)	26 July 2026	
30 June 2026	RB	Tyrell Warren (ENG)	Solihull Moors (ENG)	24 July 2026	
30 June 2026	CM	Fortune Onoh (ENG)	Sheffield Wednesday (ENG)	2 September 2026	

=== New Contract ===
Date	Pos.	Player	Contract until	Ref.
19 May 2026	GK	Seb Auton (ENG)	30 June 2027	
1 July 2026 (Note: Contract agreements were announced on 7 May, and would become official on July 1.)	CB	Alex Graham (ENG)	Undisclosed (Note: First professional contract)	
1 July 2026	CF	Elliot Smith (ENG)	Undisclosed	
9 July 2026	CB	Cameron McJannet (ENG)	30 June 2028	
28 July 2026	CM	Kieran Green (ENG)	30 June 2029	
5 August 2026	LB	Reece Staunton (IRL)	30 June 2029	
7 August 2026	CB	Charlie Elliott (ENG)	30 June 2027 (Note: First professional contract)	
26 August 2026	CM	Kristian Catchpole (ENG)	30 June 2028 (Note: First professional contract)	
16 September 2026	CM	Géza Dávid Turi (FRO)	30 June 2028	

== First-team squad ==
As of 4 November 2026

No.	Name	Position	Nationality	Place of birth	Date of birth (age)	Signed from	Date signed	Fee	Contract end
Goalkeepers
1	Harvey Cartwright	GK	(England)	Grimsby	9 May 2002 (age 24)	Hull City	28 July 2026	Loan	30 June 2027
31	Christy Pym	GK	(Northern Ireland)	Exeter	24 April 1995 (age 31)	Mansfield Town	9 July 2025	Free	30 June 2027
41	Seb Auton	GK	(England)	Kingston Upon Hull	7 November 2006 (age 20)	Academy	30 May 2025	Trainee	30 June 2027
Defenders
2	Maldini Kacurri	CB	(Albania)	Lewisham	4 October 2005 (age 21)	Arsenal	30 January 2026	Undisclosed	30 June 2027
3	Jayden Sweeney	LB	(England)	Camden	4 December 2001 (age 24)	Leyton Orient	1 July 2025	Free	30 June 2027
5	Harvey Rodgers	RB	(England)	Selby	20 October 1996 (age 30)	Accrington Stanley	1 July 2023	Free	30 June 2028
12	Joe Foulkes	RB	(England)	Dudley	23 June 2003 (age 23)	Kidderminster	1 July 2026	Free	30 June 2027
16	Reece Staunton	LB	(Republic of Ireland)	Bradford	10 December 2001 (age 24)	Spennymoor Town	1 July 2025	Free	30 June 2029
17	Cameron McJannet	CB	(England)	Milton Keynes	6 September 1998 (age 28)	Derry City	20 June 2024	Undisclosed	30 June 2028
24	Doug Tharme	CB	(England)	Birkenhead	17 August 1999 (age 27)	Blackpool	12 January 2024	Undisclosed	30 June 2028
26	Edon Pruti	CB	(Albania)	Chelsea	8 April 2002 (age 24)	Sutton United	17 June 2026	Undisclosed	30 June 2028
36	Alex Graham	CB	(England)	Durham	3 November 2007 (age 19)	Academy	1 July 2026	Trainee	
38	Charlie Elliott	CB	(England)	Wakefield		Academy	7 August 2026	Trainee	30 June 2027
Midfielders
4	Kieran Green	CM	(England)	Stockton-on-Tees	30 June 1997 (age 29)	FC Halifax Town	15 July 2022	Undisclosed	30 June 2029
7	Jamie Walker	CM	(Scotland)	Edinburgh	25 June 1993 (age 33)	Bradford City	1 July 2025	Free	30 June 2027
8	Cian Doyle	CM	(Republic of Ireland)	Ireland	7 January 2005 (age 21)	Bray Wanderers	27 July 2026	Undisclosed	30 June 2028
10	Sonny Finch	RW	(England)	Houghton-le-Spring	5 August 2005 (age 21)	South Shields	24 August 2026	Undisclosed	30 June 2029
11	Ryley Reynolds	CM	(England)	Birmingham	30 August 2005 (age 21)	Notts County	14 August 2026	Loan	30 June 2027
14	Justin Amaluzor	RW	(England)	Southwark	17 October 1996 (age 30)	Altrincham	1 July 2025	Free	30 June 2027
15	Géza Dávid Turi	CM	(Faroe Islands)	Zalaegerszeg	6 October 2001 (age 25)	Víkingur	31 January 2025	Undisclosed	30 June 2028
18	Kristian Catchpole	CM	(England)	Kingston upon Hull		Academy	26 August 2026	Trainee	30 June 2028
23	Henry Brown	CM	(England)	Louth	20 April 2007 (age 19)	Academy	30 May 2025	Trainee	30 June 2027
28	Fin Cartwright	CM	(England)	Redcar	28 February 2007 (age 19)	Middlesbrough	1 September 2026	Loan	30 June 2027
29	Mark Shelton	CM	(England)	Nottingham	12 September 1996 (age 30)	York City	1 September 2026	Loan	30 June 2027
30	Charles Vernam	LW	(England)	Lincoln	8 October 1996 (age 30)	Lincoln City	20 June 2023	Undisclosed	30 June 2027
Forwards
9	Iwan Morgan	ST	(Wales)	Cardiff	29 January 2006 (age 20)	Brentford	7 August 2026	Undisclosed	30 June 2029
19	Josh Andrews	ST	(England)	Solihull	16 October 2001 (age 25)	Gillingham	1 July 2026	Free	30 June 2028
22	Cameron Gardner	ST	(Scotland)	Newcastle-Upon-Tyne	22 September 2005 (age 21)	Academy	22 September 2023	Trainee	30 June 2028
35	Elliot Smith	ST	(England)	South Kelsey	15 March 2008 (age 18)	Academy	1 July 2026	Trainee	
39	Andy Cook	ST	(England)	Bishop Auckland	18 October 1990 (age 36)	Bradford City	1 July 2026	Free	30 June 2027
Out on Loan
6	Samuel Lavelle	CB	(Scotland)	Blackpool	3 October 1996 (age 30)	Carlisle United	25 July 2025	Free	30 June 2027
Players departed midseason
42	David Harrington	GK	(Republic of Ireland)	Cork	1 July 2000 (age 26)	Bolton Wanderers	5 September 2026	Loan	19 September 2026

== Pre-season and friendlies ==
On 1 June 2026, Grimsby Town confirmed they would begin pre-season with a visit to Cleethorpes Town on 11 July, followed by a behind-closed-doors training camp in Slovenia from 13-19 July where they would play Ukrainian Premier League side FC Zorya Luhansk on 18 July, also behind closed doors. They would then travel to National League sides Hartlepool United and Boston United on 25 and 29 July respectively, with a home fixture against Championship newcomers Lincoln City in-between the two on 28 July. The club additionally confirmed that a fixture would take place on 1 August, which later confirmed to be against Wigan Athletic. On the 23rd July, Grimsby announced a final pre-season charity friendly, away at local non-league team Grimsby Borough.

Win Draw Loss Fixtures

11 July 2026 Friendly	Cleethorpes Town	0–0	Grimsby Town	Grimsby
14:00 BST		Report		Stadium: HPS Plant Hire Stadium

18 July 2026 Friendly	Grimsby Town	1–1	Zorya Luhansk	Slovenia
12:00 BST	Vernam 45+1'	Report	Janjić 6'	Stadium: TBA

25 July 2026 Friendly	Hartlepool United	0–3	Grimsby Town	Hartlepool
15:00 BST		Report	Amaluzor 20', 51'; Cook 47'	Stadium: Victoria Park

28 July 2026 Friendly	Grimsby Town	5–1	Lincoln City	Cleethorpes
19:00 BST	Walker 21'; Vernam 26'; Amaluzor 39'; Cook 82', 86'	Report	Jefferies 68'	Stadium: Blundell Park

29 July 2026 Friendly	Boston United	0–0	Grimsby Town XI	Boston
19:00 BST		Report		Stadium: Jakemans Community Stadium

1 August 2026 Friendly	Grimsby Town	2–0	Wigan Athletic	Cleethorpes
15:00 BST	Sweeney 10'; Cook 90'	Report		Stadium: Blundell Park

4 August 2026 Friendly	Grimsby Borough	3–2	Grimsby Town XI	Grimsby
19:00 BST	Wireko 13'; Wood 42'; Couch 87'	Report	Brown 5', 56' (pen.)	Stadium: The Bradley Football Development Centre

== Competitions ==
=== League Two ===
==== League table ====
Pos	Team	Pld	W	D	L	GF	GA	GD	Pts	Promotion, qualification or relegation
2	Barnet	14	8	5	1	30	19	+11	29	Promotion to EFL League One
3	Chesterfield	16	7	4	5	30	22	+8	25	Promotion to EFL League One
4	Grimsby Town	16	6	6	4	28	19	+9	24	Qualification for League Two play-offs
5	York City	16	6	6	4	25	21	+4	24	Qualification for League Two play-offs
6	Crewe Alexandra	16	5	9	2	22	22	0	24	Qualification for League Two play-offs

Updated to match(es) played on 21 November 2026. Source: EFL Official Website
Rules for classification: 1) Points; 2) Goal difference; 3) Number of goals scored; 4) Head-to-head results; 5) Wins; 6) Away goals; 7) Penalty points (sec 9.5); 8) 12-point sending off offences

==== Results summary ====
Overall								Home						Away					
Pld	W	D	L	GF	GA	GD	Pts	W	D	L	GF	GA	GD	W	D	L	GF	GA	GD
14	5	5	4	24	18	+6	20	4	1	2	13	8	+5	1	4	2	11	10	+1

Last updated: 31 October 2026.
Source: Soccerway

==== Results by round ====
Round	1	2	3	4	5	6	7	8	9	10	11	12	13	14	15	16	17	18	19	20	21	22	23	24	25	26	27	28	29	30	31	32	33	34	35	36	37	38	39	40	41	42	43	44	45	46
Ground	H	A	H	A	A	H	H	A	H	A	H	A	A	H	A	H	A	H	A	H	A	H	H	A	A	H	H	A	A	H	H	A	H	A	H	A	A	H	A	H	H	A	H	A	H	A
Result	W	D	D	D	D	W	W	L	L	L	L	D	W	W																																
Position	10	9	10	11	11	6	3	6	9	11	16	17	11	6																																
Points	3	4	5	6	7	10	13	13	13	13	13	14	17	20																																

Source: EFL
A = Away; H = Home; W = Win; D = Draw; L = Loss; P = Postponed

==== Matches ====
On 25 June, the League Two fixtures were revealed.

Win Draw Loss Fixtures

15 August 2026 1	Grimsby Town	1–0	Exeter City	Cleethorpes
15:00 BST	Rodgers 36'; McJannet (yellow card) 43'	Report	Doyle-Hayes (yellow card) 23'	Stadium: Blundell Park; Attendance: 7,483; Referee: Abigail Byrne

22 August 2026 2	Walsall	0–0	Grimsby Town	Bescot
12:30 BST	Connolly (yellow card) 74'	Report	Sweeney (yellow card) 68'	Stadium: Pallet-Track Bescot Stadium; Attendance: 6,499 (1,167 away); Referee: Matthew Russell
Note: Fixture was originally scheduled for 3pm kick off but was moved to 12:30pm for live Sky Sports broadcast.

29 August 2026 3	Grimsby Town	2–2	Fleetwood Town	Cleethorpes
15:00 BST	Rodgers (yellow card) 25'; Doyle 37'; Cook 64'; Kacurri (yellow card) 78'	Report	Davies 6', (yellow card) 57'; Cannon (yellow card) 28'; Potter (yellow card) 45+1', (goal) 69'; Bennett (yellow card) 61'	Stadium: Blundell Park; Attendance: 7,067; Referee: Rob Massey-Ellis

1 September 2026 4	Accrington Stanley	2–2	Grimsby Town	Accrington
19:45 BST	Woods 45+7' (pen.), (yellow card) 89'; Walton 60'; Whalley (yellow card) 70'; Matthews (yellow card) 90+1'; Anderson (yellow card) 90+8'	Report	Anderson 6' (o.g.); Cook 38'; McJannet (yellow card) 76'	Stadium: Crown Ground; Attendance: 1,920; Referee: Michael Barlow

5 September 2026 5	Cheltenham Town	2–2	Grimsby Town	Cheltenham
15:00 BST	McCann 12'; Tomkinson (yellow card) 28'; Weimann 41' (pen.)	Report	Shelton 47'; Green (yellow card) 79', (goal) 82'	Stadium: EV Charger Points Stadium; Attendance: 4,758; Referee: Dale Baines

12 September 2026 6	Grimsby Town	2–0	Bristol Rovers	Cleethorpes
12:30 BST	Green 22', (yellow card) 64'; Turi 40'; Vernam (yellow card) 71'	Report	Purrington (yellow card) 10'; Forde (yellow card) 38'; Balmer (yellow card) 64'; Leigh (red card) 75'	Stadium: Blundell Park; Attendance: 6,945; Referee: Edward Duckworth
Note: Fixture was originally scheduled for 3pm kick-off but was moved to 12:30pm for live Sky Sports broadcast.

19 September 2026 7	Grimsby Town	2–0	Crawley Town	Cleethorpes
15:00 BST	Vernam (penalty missed) 13'; Morgan 30' (pen.); Green 42'; Kacurri (yellow card) 48'; Turi (yellow card) 65'	Report	Michalski (yellow card) 29'; Farquharson (yellow card) 39'; Adeyemo (yellow card) 58'; Ebiowei (yellow card) 87'	Stadium: Blundell Park; Attendance: 7,330; Referee: Emily Heaslip

26 September 2026 8	Newport County	2–1	Grimsby Town	Newport
15:00 BST	Dibley-Dias (yellow card) 10'; Doidge 57'; Gwengwe 69'; Jacob (yellow card) 90+2'	Report	Cook (yellow card) 63'; Green (yellow card) 72'; Wright 83' (o.g.)	Stadium: Rodney Parade; Attendance: 4,973; Referee: Darren Drysdale

3 October 2026 9	Grimsby Town	1–2	Shrewsbury Town	Cleethorpes
15:00 BST	Doyle (yellow card) 58'; Cartwright 58'	Report	Lloyd 19', (yellow card) 75'; Berkoe (yellow card) 26'; Fletcher (yellow card) 50'; McMahon-Brown (yellow card) 56', (goal) 60'; Ruffels (yellow card) 74'; Davison (yellow card) 90+4'	Stadium: Blundell Park; Attendance: 7,429; Referee: Matthew Corlett

10 October 2026 10	Port Vale	1–0	Grimsby Town	Burslem
15:00 BST	Hall (yellow card) 42'; Dempsey 45'	Report	Cartwright (yellow card) 45+1'	Stadium: Vale Park; Attendance: 7,412; Referee: Ross Martin

17 October 2026 11	Grimsby Town	0–2	Northampton Town	Cleethorpes
15:00 BST	Tharme (yellow card) 28'; Vernam (yellow card) 42'; Pruti (red card) 61'; Walker (yellow card) 72'	Report	Warhurst 34'; Powell (yellow card) 54'; Guthrie 58', (yellow card) 74'	Stadium: Blundell Park; Attendance: 6,911; Referee: Martin Woods

20 October 2026 12	Rochdale	2–2	Grimsby Town	Rochdale
15:00 BST	Adeeko (yellow card) 20'; Brown 38'; Francis (yellow card) 49'; Hayes (yellow card) 67'; Henderson 88'	Report	Vernam (yellow card) 6'; Kacurri (yellow card) 42'; Green 57'; Walker (yellow card) 50', (goal) 72'	Stadium: Spotland Stadium; Attendance: 3,612; Referee: Declan Bourne

24 October 2026 13	Gillingham	1–4	Grimsby Town	Gillingham
15:00 BST	McCleary (yellow card) 24'; Hale 37'; Little (yellow card) 53'; Coleman (yellow card) 90'	Report	Rodgers 7'; Turi (yellow card) 43', (goal) 64'; Amaluzor (yellow card) 51'; Morgan 54' (pen.); Kacurri (yellow card) 62'; Finch 70', (yellow card) 89'	Stadium: Priestfield Stadium; Attendance: 5,665; Referee: Sam Mulhall

31 October 2026 14	Grimsby Town	5–2	York City	Cleethorpes
12:30 GMT	Cook 13'; Morgan 31'; McJannet 75'; Andrews 78'; Turi 86'	Report	A. Hunt 18'; J. Hunt 28'	Stadium: Blundell Park; Attendance: 8,111; Referee: Aaron Jackson
Note: Fixture was initially scheduled for a 15:00 kick-off, but was brought forward for live Sky Sports broadcasting.

14 November 2026 15	Swindon Town	1–4	Grimsby Town	Swindon
15:00 GMT	Clark (yellow card) 26'; Butler (yellow card) 41' (yellow-red card) 66'; Drinan (penalty missed) , 85'	Report	Cook 21'; Morgan 43', 58' (pen.); Andrews 82'	Stadium: County Ground; Attendance: 7,020; Referee: Ruebyn Ricardo

21 November 2026 16	Grimsby Town	0–0	Rotherham United	Cleethorpes
15:00 GMT	Cartwright (yellow card) 52'; Foulkes (yellow card) 90+1'	Report	Ngwenya (yellow card) 13'; Nemane (yellow card) 27'; Hall (yellow card) 80'; Fitzgerald (yellow card) 87'	Stadium: Blundell Park; Attendance: 8,257; Referee: Jamie O'Connor

28 November 2026 17	Crewe Alexandra	v	Grimsby Town	Crewe
15:00 GMT				Stadium: Gresty Road

1 December 2026 18	Grimsby Town	v	Colchester United	Cleethorpes
19:45 GMT				Stadium: Blundell Park

12 December 2026 19	Chesterfield	v	Grimsby Town	Chesterfield
12:30 GMT				Stadium: SMH Group Stadium
Note: Fixture was initially scheduled for a 15:00 kick-off, but was brought forward for live Sky Sports broadcasting.

19 December 2026 20	Grimsby Town	v	Barnet	Cleethorpes
15:00 GMT				Stadium: Blundell Park

26 December 2026 21	Salford City	v	Grimsby Town	Salford
15:00 GMT				Stadium: Moor Lane

29 December 2026 22	Grimsby Town	v	Oldham Athletic	Cleethorpes
19:45 GMT				Stadium: Blundell Park

1 January 2027 23	Grimsby Town	v	Tranmere Rovers	Cleethorpes
15:00 GMT				Stadium: Blundell Park

9 January 2027 24	Barnet	v	Grimsby Town	Edgware
12:30 GMT				Stadium: The Hive Stadium
Note: Fixture was initially scheduled for a 15:00 kick-off, but was brought forward for live Sky Sports broadcasting.

16 January 2027 25	Northampton Town	v	Grimsby Town	Northampton
15:00 GMT				Stadium: Sixfields Stadium

19 January 2027 26	Grimsby Town	v	Rochdale	Cleethorpes
19:45 GMT				Stadium: Blundell Park

23 January 2027 27	Grimsby Town	v	Gillingham	Cleethorpes
15:00 GMT				Stadium: Blundell Park

30 January 2027 28	York City	v	Grimsby Town	York
12:30 GMT				Stadium: York Community Stadium
Note: Fixture was initially scheduled for a 15:00 kick-off, but was brought forward for live Sky Sports broadcasting.

6 February 2027 29	Fleetwood Town	v	Grimsby Town	Fleetwood
15:00 GMT				Stadium: Highbury Stadium

9 February 2027 30	Grimsby Town	v	Accrington Stanley	Cleethorpes
19:45 GMT				Stadium: Blundell Park

13 February 2027 31	Grimsby Town	v	Cheltenham Town	Cleethorpes
15:00 GMT				Stadium: Blundell Park

20 February 2027 32	Bristol Rovers	v	Grimsby Town	Bristol
15:00 GMT				Stadium: Memorial Stadium

27 February 2027 33	Grimsby Town	v	Swindon Town	Cleethorpes
15:00 GMT				Stadium: Blundell Park

6 March 2027 34	Exeter City	v	Grimsby Town	Exeter
15:00 GMT				Stadium: St James Park

13 March 2027 35	Grimsby Town	v	Walsall	Cleethorpes
15:00 GMT				Stadium: Blundell Park

20 March 2027 36	Rotherham United	v	Grimsby Town	Rotherham
15:00 GMT				Stadium: New York Stadium

26 March 2027 37	Tranmere Rovers	v	Grimsby Town	Birkenhead
15:00 GMT				Stadium: Prenton Park

29 March 2027 38	Grimsby Town	v	Salford City	Cleethorpes
15:00 BST				Stadium: Blundell Park

3 April 2026 39	Oldham Athletic	v	Grimsby Town	Oldham
15:00 BST				Stadium: Boundary Park

10 April 2027 40	Grimsby Town	v	Chesterfield	Cleethorpes
15:00 BST				Stadium: Blundell Park

13 April 2027 41	Grimsby Town	v	Port Vale	Cleethorpes
19:45 BST				Stadium: Blundell Park

17 April 2027 42	Crawley Town	v	Grimsby Town	Crawley
15:00 BST				Stadium: Broadfield Stadium

24 April 2027 43	Grimsby Town	v	Newport County	Cleethorpes
15:00 BST				Stadium: Blundell Park

27 April 2027 44	Shrewsbury Town	v	Grimsby Town	Shrewsbury
19:45 BST				Stadium: New Meadow

1 May 2027 45	Grimsby Town	v	Crewe Alexandra	Cleethorpes
15:00 BST				Stadium: Blundell Park

8 May 2027 46	Colchester United	v	Grimsby Town	Colchester
15:00 BST				Stadium: Colchester Community Stadium

=== FA Cup ===
Grimsby were drawn away to Stafford Rangers in the first round and at home to Oldham Athletic in the second round.

Win Draw Loss Fixtures

8 November 2026 First round	Stafford Rangers	3–3 (2–3 p)	Grimsby Town	Stafford
12:00 GMT	Mason 3', 93'; Gomes (yellow card) 6'; Birch 43'; Tonks (yellow card) 76'; Dunne (yellow card) 80'; Navarro (yellow card) 120+2'	Report	McJannet (yellow card) 45+2'; Rodgers 74'; Kacurri 76', (yellow card) 89'; Turi 105+2'; Walker (yellow card) 120+1'	Stadium: Marston Road; Attendance: 3,113; Referee: Isaac Searle
	Penalties
	Birch (penalty missed); Banks (penalty scored); Washington (penalty missed); Sambor (penalty scored); Nevarro (penalty missed)		(penalty missed) Walker; (penalty scored) Cook; (penalty scored) Doyle; (penalty scored) Amaluzor
Note: Fixture was selected for live TNT Sports broadcasting.

5 December 2026 Second round	Grimsby Town	v	Oldham Athletic	Cleethorpes
15:00 GMT				Stadium: Blundell Park

=== EFL Cup ===
Win Draw Loss Fixtures

As a League Two team, Grimsby entered the EFL Cup in the first round, and were drawn at home to League One side Blackpool.

8 August 2026 First Round	Grimsby Town	1–3	Blackpool	Cleethorpes
15:00 BST	Rodgers 90+2'	Report	Ennis 3'; Williams (yellow card) 55'; Bowler 58'; Kouassi 90+5'	Stadium: Blundell Park; Attendance: 4,817

=== EFL Trophy ===
==== Group stage ====
Grimsby were drawn against Burton Albion, Notts County and Nottingham Forest U21 into Northern Group F.

Pos	Div	Team	Pld	W	PW	PL	L	GF	GA	GD	Pts	Qualification
1	L1	Notts County	3	3	0	0	0	10	2	+8	9	Advance to Round 2
2	ACA	Nottingham Forest U21	3	1	1	0	1	5	6	−1	5	Advance to Round 2
3	L1	Burton Albion	3	0	1	1	1	1	4	−3	3	
4	L2	Grimsby Town	3	0	0	1	2	1	5	−4	1	

Source: EFL

Win Draw Loss Fixtures

22 September 2026 Group Stage	Notts County	2–1	Grimsby Town	Nottingham
19:00 BST	McDonald (yellow card) 10'; Roberts 32', (yellow card) 34'; Palmer (yellow card) 89'; Cooper 90+7'	Report	Sweeney 79', (yellow card) 90+6'	Stadium: Meadow Lane; Attendance: 2,032; Referee: Jamie Robinson

6 October 2026 Group Stage	Grimsby Town	0–0 (2–4 p)	Burton Albion	Cleethorpes
19:00 BST	Cartwright (yellow card) 12'; Kacurri (yellow card) 59'	Report	Adiele (yellow card) 82'	Stadium: Blundell Park; Attendance: 539 (30 away); Referee: Aaron Bannister
	Penalties
	Green (penalty missed); Vernam (penalty scored); Finch (penalty missed); Foulkes (penalty scored)		Sraha (penalty scored); Adiele (penalty scored); Scutt (penalty scored); Jones (penalty scored)

10 November 2026 Group Stage	Grimsby Town	0–3	Nottingham Forest U21	Cleethorpes
19:00 BST		Report	Andrews 16'; Newton 21'; Orr 44'	Stadium: Blundell Park; Attendance: 574; Referee: Gareth Thomas

== Statistics ==
=== Appearances and goals ===
As of match played 21 November 2026

Players with no appearances are not included on the list

No.	Pos	Nat	Player	Total		League Two		FA Cup		EFL Cup		EFL Trophy	
No.	Pos	Nat	Player	Apps	Goals	Apps	Goals	Apps	Goals	Apps	Goals	Apps	Goals
1	GK	(England) ENG	Harvey Cartwright	3	0	0+0	0	1+0	0	0+0	0	2+0	0
2	DF	(Albania) ALB	Maldini Kacurri	17	1	13+0	0	1+0	1	1+0	0	0+2	0
3	DF	(England) ENG	Jayden Sweeney	15	1	12+0	0	0+1	0	1+0	0	0+1	1
4	MF	(England) ENG	Kieran Green	16	4	14+0	4	0+0	0	1+0	0	0+1	0
5	DF	(England) ENG	Harvey Rodgers	18	4	16+0	2	1+0	1	1+0	1	0+0	0
6	DF	(Scotland) SCO	Sam Lavelle	1	0	0+0	0	0+0	0	0+0	0	1+0	0
7	MF	(Scotland) SCO	Jamie Walker	15	1	7+5	1	0+1	0	1+0	0	1+0	0
8	MF	(Republic of Ireland) IRL	Cian Doyle	18	1	7+7	1	0+1	0	0+1	0	2+0	0
9	FW	(Wales) WAL	Iwan Morgan	19	5	10+6	5	1+0	0	0+1	0	1+0	0
10	FW	(England) ENG	Sonny Finch	16	1	5+8	1	0+1	0	0+0	0	2+0	0
11	MF	(England) ENG	Ryley Reynolds	11	0	1+8	0	0+0	0	0+0	0	2+0	0
12	DF	(England) ENG	Joe Foulkes	10	0	5+2	0	1+0	0	0+0	0	2+0	0
14	MF	(England) ENG	Justin Amaluzor	15	0	8+4	0	0+1	0	1+0	0	0+1	0
15	MF	(Faroe Islands) FRO	Géza Dávid Turi	14	4	12+0	3	1+0	1	1+0	0	0+0	0
16	DF	(Republic of Ireland) IRL	Reece Staunton	2	0	0+1	0	0+0	0	0+0	0	1+0	0
17	DF	(England) ENG	Cameron McJannet	15	1	13+0	1	1+0	0	1+0	0	0+0	0
18	MF	(England) ENG	Kristian Catchpole	2	0	0+0	0	0+0	0	0+1	0	1+0	0
19	FW	(England) ENG	Josh Andrews	7	2	0+5	2	1+0	0	0+1	0	0+0	0
23	MF	(England) ENG	Henry Brown	3	0	0+0	0	0+0	0	0+0	0	3+0	0
24	DF	(England) ENG	Doug Tharme	3	0	1+0	0	0+0	0	0+0	0	2+0	0
26	DF	(Albania) ALB	Edon Pruti	4	0	2+1	0	0+0	0	0+0	0	1+0	0
28	MF	(England) ENG	Finlay Cartwright	15	1	4+8	1	1+0	0	0+0	0	2+0	0
29	MF	(England) ENG	Mark Shelton	8	1	5+2	1	1+0	0	0+0	0	0+0	0
30	MF	(England) ENG	Charles Vernam	19	0	13+3	0	1+0	0	1+0	0	0+1	0
31	GK	(Northern Ireland) NIR	Christy Pym	15	0	14+0	0	0+0	0	1+0	0	0+0	0
35	FW	(England) ENG	Elliot Smith	1	0	0+0	0	0+0	0	0+0	0	0+1	0
36	DF	(England) ENG	Alex Graham	3	0	0+0	0	0+0	0	0+0	0	3+0	0
38	DF	(England) ENG	Charlie Elliott	1	0	0+0	0	0+0	0	0+0	0	1+0	0
39	FW	(England) ENG	Andy Cook	17	4	12+3	4	0+1	0	1+0	0	0+0	0
41	GK	(England) ENG	Seb Auton	3	0	0+1	0	0+0	0	0+0	0	1+1	0
42	GK	(Republic of Ireland) IRL	David Harrington	2	0	2+0	0	0+0	0	0+0	0	0+0	0
47	FW	(England) ENG	Ted Sharp	1	0	0+0	0	0+0	0	0+0	0	1+0	0
48	MF	(Romania) ROU	Darius Neagu	2	0	0+0	0	0+0	0	0+0	0	1+1	0
49	FW	(England) ENG	Curtis Manyika	1	0	0+0	0	0+0	0	0+0	0	0+1	0
50	DF	(England) ENG	Malaki Golding	1	0	0+0	0	0+0	0	0+0	0	1+0	0
51	FW	(England) ENG	Fortune Jack	1	0	0+0	0	0+0	0	0+0	0	0+1	0
52	FW	(England) ENG	Harvey Booth	1	0	0+0	0	0+0	0	0+0	0	1+0	0
54	DF	(England) ENG	Josh Edwards	1	0	0+0	0	0+0	0	0+0	0	0+1	0
55	MF	(England) ENG	Noah Hutton	1	0	0+0	0	0+0	0	0+0	0	0+1	0
57	DF	(England) ENG	Tyler Pratt	1	0	0+0	0	0+0	0	0+0	0	1+0	0
58	DF	(Wales) WAL	Max Horsman	1	0	0+0	0	0+0	0	0+0	0	0+1	0

=== Disciplinary record ===
As of match played 21 November 2026

Includes all competitive matches. The list is sorted by squad number when disciplinary points / points per card / number of cards are equal. Players with no cards not included in the list.

Rank	No.	Pos.	Nat.	Name	League Two			FA Cup			EFL Cup			EFL Trophy			Total		
Rank	No.	Pos.	Nat.	Name	Yellow card	Second yellow card	Red card	Yellow card	Second yellow card	Red card	Yellow card	Second yellow card	Red card	Yellow card	Second yellow card	Red card	Yellow card	Second yellow card	Red card
1	2	DF	(Albania)	Maldini Kacurri	4	0	0	0	0	0	0	0	0	1	0	0	5	0	0
2	4	MF	(England)	Kieran Green	3	0	0	0	0	0	0	0	0	0	0	0	3	0	0
2	7	MF	(Scotland)	Jamie Walker	2	0	0	1	0	0	0	0	0	0	0	0	3	0	0
2	17	DF	(England)	Cameron McJannet	2	0	0	1	0	0	0	0	0	0	0	0	3	0	0
2	26	DF	(Albania)	Edon Pruti	0	0	1	0	0	0	0	0	0	0	0	0	0	0	1
2	28	MF	(England)	Fin Cartwright	2	0	0	0	0	0	0	0	0	1	0	0	3	0	0
2	30	MF	(England)	Charles Vernam	3	0	0	0	0	0	0	0	0	0	0	0	3	0	0
8	3	DF	(England)	Jayden Sweeney	1	0	0	0	0	0	0	0	0	1	0	0	2	0	0
8	5	DF	(England)	Harvey Rodgers	1	0	0	1	0	0	0	0	0	0	0	0	2	0	0
8	15	MF	(Faroe Islands)	Géza Dávid Turi	2	0	0	0	0	0	0	0	0	0	0	0	2	0	0
11	5	DF	(England)	Harvey Rodgers	1	0	0	0	0	0	0	0	0	0	0	0	1	0	0
11	8	MF	(Republic of Ireland)	Cian Doyle	1	0	0	0	0	0	0	0	0	0	0	0	1	0	0
11	10	MF	(England)	Sonny Finch	1	0	0	0	0	0	0	0	0	0	0	0	1	0	0
11	12	DF	(England)	Joe Foulkes	1	0	0	0	0	0	0	0	0	0	0	0	1	0	0
11	14	MF	(England)	Justin Amaluzor	1	0	0	0	0	0	0	0	0	0	0	0	1	0	0
11	24	DF	(England)	Doug Tharme	1	0	0	0	0	0	0	0	0	0	0	0	1	0	0
11	39	FW	(England)	Andy Cook	1	0	0	0	0	0	0	0	0	0	0	0	1	0	0
Total					26	0	1	3	0	0	0	0	0	3	0	0	32	0	1
