= Edon Pruti =

Footballer (born 2002)

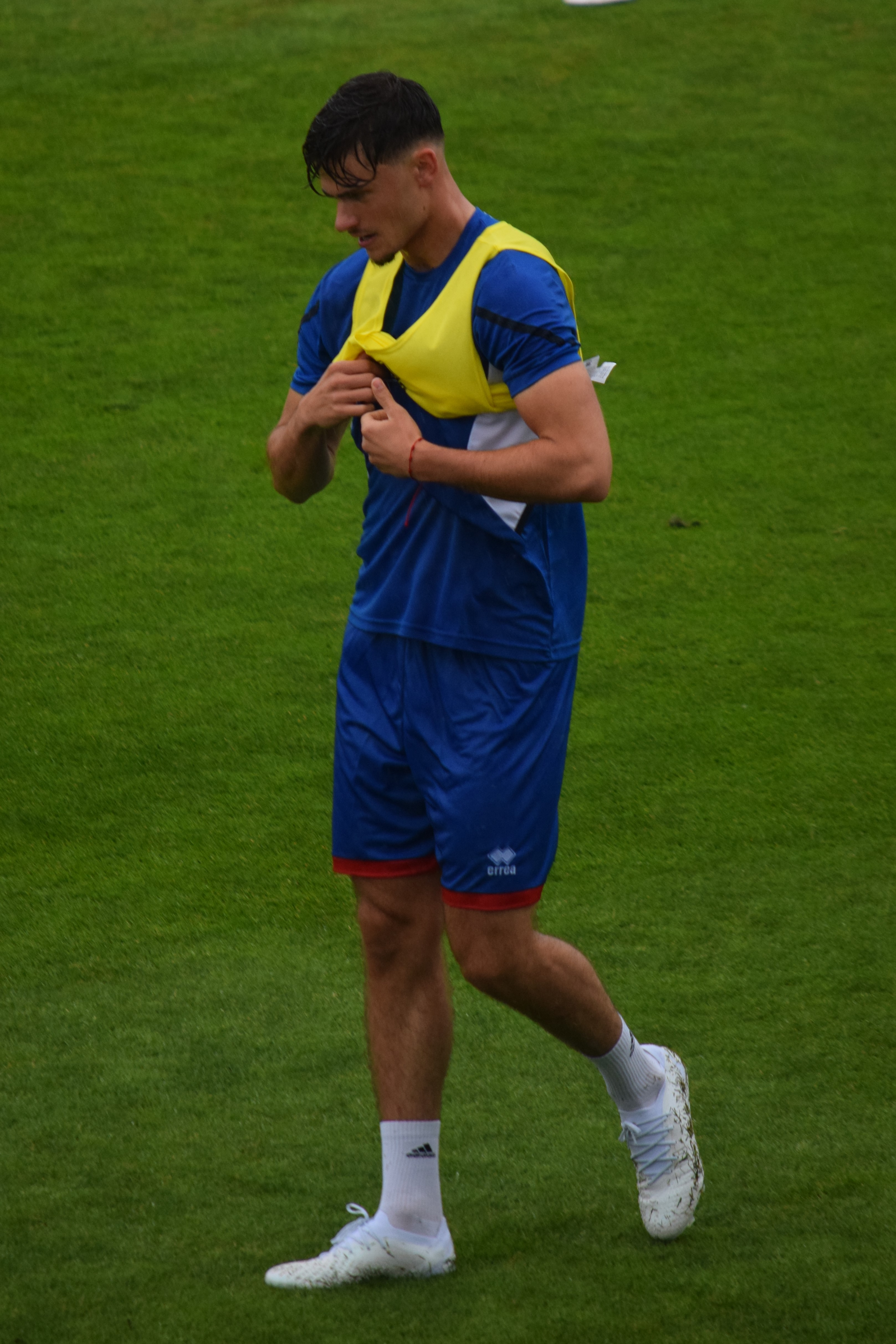
- Pruti warming up for Hartlepool United in 2023

Personal information
- Full name: Edon Pruti
- Date of birth: 8 April 2002 (age 24)
- Place of birth: Chelsea, England
- Height: 1.88 m (6 ft 2 in)
- Position: Central defender

Team information
- Current team: Grimsby Town
- Number: 26

Youth career
- –2018: Stevenage
- 2018–2020: Burnley

Senior career*
Years	Team	Apps	(Gls)
2019–2020	Burnley	0	(0)
2019	→ Abbey Hey (loan)		
2021–2022	Hanwell Town	7	(1)
2021	Loughborough University	1	(0)
2022	Slough Town	22	(1)
2022–2023	Brentford	0	(0)
2023–2024	Hartlepool United	23	(0)
2023–2024	→ Farnborough (loan)	12	(0)
2024	→ Farnborough (loan)	15	(2)
2024–2025	Farnborough	23	(1)
2025	Slough Town	16	(2)
2025–2026	Sutton United	36	(3)
2026–	Grimsby Town	3	(0)

International career
2019	Albania U18	1	(0)
- Albania U19
2023	Albania U21	1	(0)
- * Club domestic league appearances and goals as of 16:02, 18 October 2026 (UTC)

Edon Pruti (born 8 April 2002) is a professional footballer who plays as a central defender for EFL League Two club Grimsby Town.

Pruti is a product of the Stevenage and Burnley academies and began his senior career in non-League football with Hanwell Town and Slough Town. He began his professional career with Brentford B in 2022. Pruti briefly played in the English Football League for Hartlepool United in 2023, before continuing his career in non-League football. He returned to the English Football League with Grimsby Town in 2026. Born in England, Pruti was capped by Albania at youth international level.

== Club career ==
=== Youth years ===
A central defender, Pruti began his career in Sunday league football. Following a spell in the Stevenage academy, he signed a two-year scholarship with the Burnley academy at the end of the 2017–18 season. Prior to the cancellation of the 2019–20 season due to the COVID-19 pandemic, Pruti played the first senior football of his career away on loan at North West Counties League First Division South club Abbey Hey. Pruti sign a three-month extension to his scholarship in June 2020, but was released when it expired in September 2020.

=== Non-League football ===
Late in the COVID-19-affected 2020–21 season, Pruti made cup appearances for Isthmian League South Central Division club Hanwell Town. He was a part of the club's Middlesex Senior Cup-winning squad and played, scored and was named man of the match in the 1–0 victory over Harefield United in the Final. Pruti remained with the club and made 10 appearances, scoring one goal, during the first half of the 2021–22 season. He transferred to National League South club Slough Town in January 2022 and made 9 appearances and scored one goal during the remainder of the 2021–22 season. Following three appearances during the opening month of the 2022–23 season, Pruti departed Arbour Park.

=== Brentford ===
On 31 August 2022, Pruti joined the B team at Premier League club Brentford on a one-year contract, with the option of a further year, for an undisclosed fee. He had played for the team on trial early in the 2021–22 season. Following 14 appearances and one goal, Pruti transferred out of the club in January 2023.

=== Hartlepool United ===
On 13 January 2023, Pruti signed a short-term contract with League Two club Hartlepool United, with an option to extend. He made 21 appearances during the remainder of the 2022–23 season, which culminated in relegation to the National League. In May 2023, the club opted to extend Pruti's contract. Following two early-2023–24 season appearances, he was dropped from the matchday squad and played much of the remainder of the campaign away on loan. Pruti was released by Hartlepool United when his contract expired at the end of the 2023–24 season.

=== Return to non-League football ===
Pruti spent the majority of 2023–24 season on loan at National League South club Farnborough, whom he initially joined on 20 October 2023. He transferred to the club on a permanent basis on 2 August 2024. After making 25 appearances and scoring one goal during the first half of the 2024–25 season, Pruti returned to Slough Town and signed an 18-month contract. He made 16 appearances and scored two goals during the remainder of a mid-table 2024–25 season.

On 17 May 2025, Pruti transferred to National League club Sutton United for an undisclosed fee. He made 43 appearances during the 2025–26 season, scoring three goals and captaining the team in 21 matches. Pruti remained under contract for the 2026–27 season, but was replaced as captain by Jake Taylor. He departed the club in June 2026.

=== Grimsby Town ===
On 17 June 2026, Pruti transferred to League Two club Grimsby Town and signed a two-year contract for an undisclosed fee. On October 17, Pruti suffered a double leg break during a league match against Northampton Town, and received a red card for his tackle on Northampton player Joe Wormleighton that caused the injury.

== International career ==
Pruti was called up to a Kosovo U19 training camp held in April 2019. He was also called into a Bosnia and Herzegovina U18 training camp in January 2020, but did not participate. Pruti later switched his international allegiance to Albania, with whom he was capped at U18 and U19 level. He was called into the U21 squad for friendly matches versus Poland and Azerbaijan in March 2023, but remained with his club. Pruti made his U21 debut with a substitute appearance in a 3–1 friendly defeat to Bulgaria on 20 June 2023. He won further call-ups for 2025 European U21 Championship qualifiers in October and November 2023, but did not make an appearance.

== Personal life ==
Pruti was born at the Chelsea and Westminster Hospital, to a Bosnian father and Kosovan mother. He was brought up in the London area of Ladbroke Grove. As of 2023, Pruti was in a relationship with Tallulah-May Flood, niece of Victoria Beckham.

== Career statistics ==
As of match played 17 October 2026

Appearances and goals by club, season and competition
Club	Season	League			National cup (Note: Includes FA Cup)		League cup (Note: Includes National League Cup, EFL Cup)		Other		Total	
Club	Season	Division	Apps	Goals	Apps	Goals	Apps	Goals	Apps	Goals	Apps	Goals
Hanwell Town	2020–21	Isthmian League South Central Division	0	0	0	0	―		5 (Note: 3 appearances and 1 goal in London Senior Cup, 2 appearances and 1 goal in Middlesex Senior Cup)	2	5	2
Hanwell Town	2021–22	Isthmian League South Central Division	7	1	1	0	―		2 (Note: 1 appearance in FA Trophy, 1 appearance in London Senior Cup)	0	10	1
Hanwell Town	Total		7	1	1	0	―		7	2	15	3
Loughborough University	2021–22	United Counties League Premier Division North	1	0	―		―		―		1	0
Slough Town	2021–22	National League South	19	1	―		―		―		19	1
Slough Town	2022–23	National League South	3	0	―		―		―		3	0
Slough Town	Total		22	1	―		―		―		22	1
Hartlepool United	2022–23	League Two	21	0	―		―		―		21	0
Hartlepool United	2023–24	National League	2	0	0	0	―		0	0	2	0
Hartlepool United	Total		23	0	0	0	―		0	0	23	0
Farnborough (loan)	2023–24	National League South	27	2	―		―		0	0	27	2
Farnborough	2024–25	National League South	23	1	1	0	―		1 (Note: Appearance in FA Trophy)	0	25	1
Farnborough	Total		50	3	1	0	―		1	0	52	3
Slough Town	2024–25	National League South	16	2	―		―		―		16	2
Sutton United	2025–26	National League	36	3	2	0	3	0	0	0	41	3
Grimsby Town	2026–27	League Two	3	0	0	0	0	0	1 (Note: Appearance in EFL Trophy)	0	4	0
Career total			150	10	4	0	3	0	9	2	176	12

== Honours ==
Hanwell Town

- Middlesex Senior Cup: 2020–21
