= Andy Cook (footballer, born 1990) =

English footballer (born 1990)

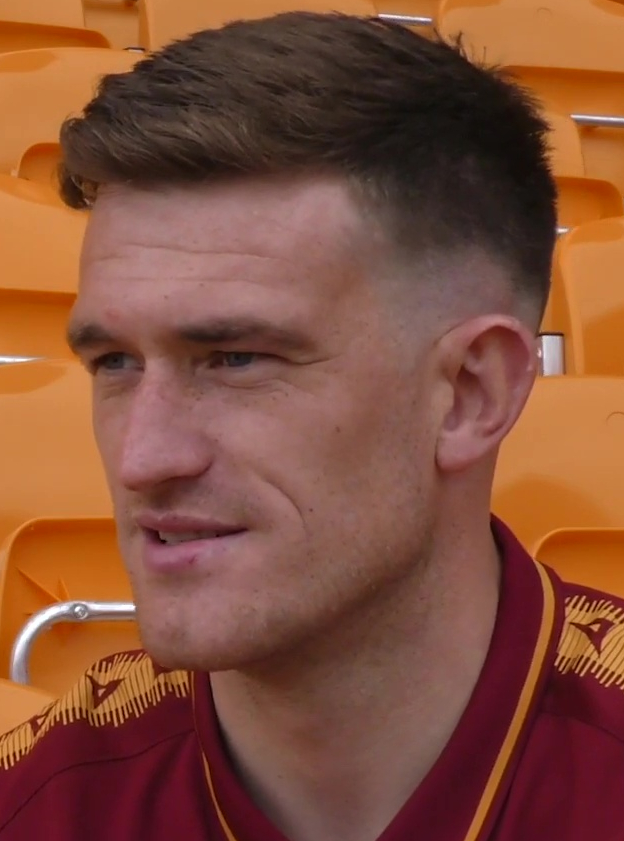
- Cook in 2021

Personal information
- Full name: Andrew Ellis Cook
- Date of birth: 18 October 1990 (age 36)
- Place of birth: Bishop Auckland, England
- Height: 6 ft 1 in (1.85 m)
- Position: Striker

Team information
- Current team: Grimsby Town
- Number: 39

Youth career
- –2009: Carlisle United

Senior career*
Years	Team	Apps	(Gls)
2009–2011	Carlisle United	0	(0)
2009	→ Workington (loan)	16	(5)
2009	→ Workington (loan)	6	(0)
2009	→ Barrow (loan)	3	(1)
2010	→ Barrow (loan)	11	(0)
2011–2012	Barrow	60	(18)
2012–2014	Grimsby Town	73	(14)
2014–2016	Barrow	87	(47)
2016–2018	Tranmere Rovers	85	(49)
2018–2019	Walsall	43	(13)
2019–2021	Mansfield Town	43	(9)
2020	→ Tranmere Rovers (loan)	5	(0)
2021	→ Bradford City (loan)	21	(8)
2021–2026	Bradford City	156	(69)
2026	→ Grimsby Town (loan)	22	(8)
2026–	Grimsby Town	13	(3)

International career^{‡}
2013	England C	1	(0)
- * Club domestic league appearances and goals as of 11:20, 10 November 2026 (UTC) ‡ National team caps and goals as of 15:58, 5 August 2018 (GMT)

Andrew Ellis Cook (born 18 October 1990) is an English professional footballer who plays as a forward for EFL League Two team Grimsby Town.

He started his professional career at Carlisle United in the Football League in 2009, and found himself on the fringes of the first team but instead he spent numerous loan spells with Workington and Barrow where he featured regularly. He departed Carlisle in 2011 to join Barrow having failed to make an appearance in United's first team and in June 2012 he moved again joining Grimsby Town. After establishing himself as a first team regular at Grimsby he moved back west, for his 4th stint with Barrow. He would find his most prolific goal-scoring form yet in these two seasons, scoring 47 goals in 87 league appearances, which earned him a move to fellow National League side Tranmere Rovers. His time at Tranmere, when he scored 51 goals in 97 appearances, winning him the divisional Golden Boot award, ended in 2018 with a 2–1 victory in the National League play-off final. He left Tranmere at the end of his contract and joined League One club Walsall

== Club career ==
=== Carlisle United ===
Born in Bishop Auckland, County Durham, Cook started his career with the Carlisle United youth system where he was awarded a scholarship and signed a full-time professional contract, scoring 22 goals in his first season at Brunton Park, and 37 goals in his second season for the club's youth and second-string during the 2008–09 season.

Having signed pro terms Cook was loaned out to Conference North side Workington on an initial one-month loan, but remained there for the rest of the campaign. Cook also rejoined Workington the following season on a one-month loan.

=== Barrow ===
==== 2009–10 ====
In October 2009 Cook joined Conference National side Barrow on an initial one-month loan. He made a scoring debut for the Bluebirds when he netted in the 2–0 win over Ebbsfleet United on 17 October 2009, he scored another goal on 7 November 2009 in the 2–1 first-round FA Cup victory over Eastleigh. He made 3 appearances during his initial loan spell, scoring twice, Cook returned for a second spell almost immediately but broke his foot against AFC Wimbledon, resulting in him taking no more part in the season, he headed back to Carlisle United to recover.

==== 2010–11 ====
Cook returned to Barrow at the start of the 2010–11 season on a one-month loan before making a permanent move in January 2010 signing a two-and-a-half-year deal on a free transfer. Cook was used mainly as a substitute for the majority of the season. Cook scored just one goal all season, an equaliser from just outside the box in the 3–2 defeat against Crawley Town.

==== 2011–12 ====
Cook scored his first three goals and also his first hat-trick in a 4–0 win against the previously unbeaten Fleetwood Town. After receiving a red card in a 1–0 win against Lincoln, Cook returned for the bluebirds after serving a three match suspension and scored his second hat-trick in the 3–1 home win against Hayes & Yeading United on 15 October 2011.

On 7 January Cook scored a brace in the 3–0 home thrashing of Darlington. Two more goals were to follow on 21 January 2012 in the 2–3 win at Tamworth. On 18 February 2012, Cook scored another 2 goals in the 3–0 victory against Kettering.

On 28 April 2012, Cook scored his final goal for Barrow in the 3–1 victory against Newport finishing the 2011–12 season with 17 goals in 39 appearances making him the club's top scorer.

=== Grimsby Town ===
Cook signed a two-year contract with the option of a further year with Conference National side Grimsby Town on 6 June 2012, having agreed a compensation deal with Barrow for an undisclosed fee. Cook played 120 minutes at Wembley in the FA Trophy final against Wrexham; he scored to put The Mariners ahead before eventually falling short in a penalty shootout. Cook finished the season with 16 goals in all competitions.

On 9 May 2014, Cook was released by The Mariners, both his seasons with the club ended in Play-off semi-final defeats.

=== Return to Barrow ===
On 30 June 2014, Cook returned to former club Barrow, penning a two-year deal.

=== Tranmere Rovers ===
On 1 July 2016, Cook signed for Tranmere on a two-year deal. Cook was Tranmere's top scorer in both his seasons at Prenton Park, helping Tranmere to a record points total of 95 in 2016-17 and then promotion into the Football League in 2017–18. Cook won the National League Golden Boot as the top scorer in the league for 2017–18. His final goal in a Tranmere shirt was the first goal in Tranmere's 2–1 victory over Boreham Wood in the 2018 National League play-off final.

=== Walsall ===
On 22 May 2018, it was announced that Cook would be signing for Walsall on a two-year contract, linking up with former Wrexham manager, Dean Keates. Cook scored on his EFL debut, a rebound from a penalty in a 2–1 home victory against Plymouth Argyle.

=== Mansfield Town ===
Cook joined Mansfield Town on 21 June 2019 for an undisclosed fee on a two-year contract.

Despite scoring 7 goals in his first 10 games for Mansfield, he was loaned out to former club Tranmere Rovers on 31 January 2020.

At the end of the 2020–21 season, Cook was released by Mansfield.

=== Bradford City ===
On 27 January 2021, Cook signed for Bradford City on loan until the end of the 2020–21 season.

After an impressive loan spell that saw him score 8 goals in 16 starts, Cook joined Bradford on a permanent basis on 12 June 2021, signing a two-year deal.

Five goals in four matches in September 2022, taking his account for the season up to 11 in all competitions, saw Cook win the EFL League Two Player of the Month Award.

Cook was nominated for the 2022–23 League Two Player of the Season award after helping Bradford City into the play-off places. He missed out on this award to Northampton Town's Sam Hoskins, but was named in the division's team of the season.

Cook won the League Two golden boot award after scoring 28 goals in the regular season. He also won five awards at Bradford City's end of season awards, including Player of the Year. Following defeat in the play-off semi-final, he signed a new three-year contract in May 2023.

On 23 September, Cook scored a hat-trick against Newport County in a 4–1 win, Bradford City's first away win of the season.

On 1 January 2025, Cook sustained an injury to his anterior cruciate ligament, ruling him out for the remainder of the 2024–25 season. He had scored 15 goals in his 29 appearances during the season.

Ahead of the 2025–26 season, Cook missed pre-season due to injury.

On 2 September 2025, Cook was named on the bench in an EFL Trophy game against Grimsby Town, his first squad appearance since his ACL injury. Cook entered the pitch with his side losing 1–0 and subsequently scored two goals in 20 minutes to win the match

On 24 September 2025, Cook scored against his boyhood team in a 4–1 defeat to Newcastle United at St James' Park in the third round of the EFL Cup.

He was released by Bradford City at the end of the 2025–26 season.

=== Return to Grimsby Town ===
On 12 January 2026, Cook returned to Grimsby Town on loan from Bradford City for the remainder of the 2025–26 season, nearly fourteen years after he had originally joined the club. He made his second debut for Grimsby five days later, coming on as a substitute in a 1–0 League Two victory over Barnet.

Cook made his first start following his return on 20 January and scored from the penalty spot in a 2–0 victory over Cleethorpes Town in the semi-final of the Lincolnshire Senior Cup. His first Football League goals of the spell came on 18 February, when he scored twice during the second half of a 2–2 home draw with Walsall.

Cook contributed several goals during Grimsby's pursuit of a play-off position, including two goals and an assist in a 3–2 victory over fellow play-off challengers Crewe Alexandra on 11 April. Grimsby subsequently secured a place in the League Two play-offs, with Cook finishing the regular season having scored seven goals and provided two assists in 22 league appearances after joining on loan. He started both legs of the play-off semi-final against Salford City, which Grimsby lost 4–3 on aggregate after extra time.

On 15 June 2026, Grimsby announced that Cook would join the club permanently following the expiration of his Bradford City contract. He signed a one-year agreement containing an option for a further season. His first competitive appearance after signing permanently came on 8 August, when he started a 3–1 defeat against Blackpool in the first round of the EFL Cup.

Cook scored his first competitive goal since completing the permanent transfer on 29 August, finishing a pass from Géza Dávid Turi to put Grimsby ahead in an eventual 2–2 league draw with Fleetwood Town.

== International career ==
On 4 June 2013, Cook made his debut for the England C team in a 6–1 win away at Bermuda.

== Career statistics ==
As of match played 8 November 2026

Appearances and goals by club, season and competition
Club	Season	League			FA Cup		League Cup		Other		Total	
Club	Season	Division	Apps	Goals	Apps	Goals	Apps	Goals	Apps	Goals	Apps	Goals
Workington (loan)	2008–09	Conference North	16	5	—		—		—		16	5
Workington (loan)	2009–10	Conference North	6	0	—		—		—		6	0
Workington (loan)	Total		22	5	—		—		—		22	5
Barrow (loan)	2009–10	Conference Premier	3	1	1	1	—		—		4	2
Barrow	2010–11 (Note: Cook made eleven appearances for Barrow on loan from Carlisle United before signing permanently in the January transfer window.)	Conference Premier	33	1	0	0	—		0	0	33	1
Barrow	2011–12	Conference Premier	38	17	1	0	—		2 (Note: Appearance(s) in FA Trophy)	0	41	17
Barrow	Total		74	19	2	1	—		2	0	78	20
Grimsby Town	2012–13	Conference Premier	43	11	1	0	—		10 (Note: Two appearances in Conference Premier play-offs, eight appearances and five goals in FA Trophy)	5	54	16
Grimsby Town	2013–14	Conference Premier	30	3	2	1	—		9 (Note: Two appearances in Conference Premier play-offs, seven appearances and two goals in FA Trophy)	2	41	6
Grimsby Town	Total		73	14	3	1	—		19	7	95	22
Barrow	2014–15	Conference North	42	23	1	0	—		1	0	44	23
Barrow	2015–16	National League	45	24	1	0	—		2	0	48	24
Barrow	Total		87	47	2	0	—		3	0	92	47
Tranmere Rovers	2016–17	National League	44	23	1	0	—		5 (Note: Two appearances in National League play-offs, three appearances in FA Trophy)	0	50	23
Tranmere Rovers	2017–18	National League	41	26	3	1	—		3 (Note: Two appearances and one goal in National League play-offs, one appearance in FA Trophy)	1	47	28
Tranmere Rovers	Total		85	49	4	1	—		8	1	97	51
Walsall	2018–19	League One	43	13	3	3	2	1	2 (Note: Appearances in EFL Trophy)	1	50	18
Mansfield Town	2019–20	League Two	23	7	2	0	1	0	2	0	28	7
Mansfield Town	2020–21	League Two	20	2	2	0	1	0	1	0	24	2
Mansfield Town	Total		43	9	4	0	2	0	3	0	52	9
Tranmere Rovers (loan)	2019–20	League One	5	0	—		—		—		5	0
Bradford City (loan)	2020–21	League Two	21	8	0	0	0	0	0	0	21	8
Bradford City	2021–22	League Two	39	12	0	0	1	0	2	0	42	12
Bradford City	2022–23	League Two	46	28	1	0	2	3	3 (Note: Two appearances in League Two play-offs, one appearance in EFL Trophy)	0	52	31
Bradford City	2023–24	League Two	41	17	1	0	2	0	4	2	48	19
Bradford City	2024–25	League Two	22	12	2	0	1	1	4	2	29	15
Bradford City	2025–26	League One	8	0	1	0	1	1	3	2	13	3
Bradford City	Total		156	69	5	0	7	5	16	6	183	80
Grimsby Town (loan)	2025–26	League Two	22	8	1	0	—		2	0	25	8
Grimsby Town	2026–27	League Two	13	3	1	0	1	0	0	0	15	3
Career total			644	244	25	6	11	4	55	15	735	269

== Honours ==
Grimsby Town

- Lincolnshire Senior Cup: 2012–13
- FA Trophy runner-up: 2012–13

Barrow

- National League North: 2014–15

Tranmere Rovers

- National League play-offs: 2018

Bradford City

- EFL League Two third-place promotion: 2024–25

Individual

- EFL League Two Golden Boot: 2022–23
- EFL League Two Team of the Season: 2022–23
- PFA Team of the Year: 2022–23 League Two
- PFA League Two Player of the Year: 2022–23
- EFL League Two Player of the Month: September 2022
- National League Golden Boot: 2017–18
- National League Team of the Year: 2017–18
- National League Player of the Month: April 2018
- Walsall Player of the Season: 2018–19
- Tranmere Rovers Player of the Year: 2016–17, 2017–18
- Tranmere Rovers Players' Player of the Year: 2016–17, 2017–18
