= Bekim Kastrati =

Albanian footballer

Personal information
- Date of birth: 25 March 1979 (age 47)
- Place of birth: Peć, SFR Yugoslavia
- Height: 1.86 m (6 ft 1 in)
- Position: Forward

Youth career
- Besa Peja
- Germania Geistenbeck
- –2000: 1. FC Mönchengladbach
- 2000–2001: SC Wegberg

Senior career*
Years	Team	Apps	(Gls)
2001–2002	FC Wegberg-Beeck	22	(4)
2002–2003	Aris Thessaloniki	0	(0)
2003–2004	Borussia Freialdenhoven	34	(13)
2004–2006	Borussia Mönchengladbach II	58	(41)
2005–2006	Borussia Mönchengladbach	4	(0)
2006–2007	Eintracht Braunschweig	6	(1)
2006–2007	→ Eintracht Braunschweig II	2	(1)
2007–2009	Fortuna Düsseldorf	37	(5)
2007–2009	→ Fortuna Düsseldorf II	7	(2)
2009–2010	Dynamo Dresden	8	(0)
2009–2010	→ Dynamo Dresden II	1	(2)
2010	Bonner SC	10	(5)
2010–2012	Wuppertaler SV Borussia	34	(5)
2012–2013	TuS 64 Bösinghoven	29	(11)
2013–2015	SC Rheindahlen		
Total		244	(87)

International career
2006	Albania	2	(0)
- * Club domestic league appearances and goals

Bekim Kastrati (born 25 March 1979) is a former professional footballer who played as a forward and spent the majority of his career in Germany. Born in Yugoslavia, he represented Albania internationally.

== Club career ==
Kastrati number of German clubs including Fortuna Düsseldorf, Eintracht Braunschweig and Borussia Mönchengladbach. He joined Bonn from Dynamo Dresden in January 2010 before switching to Wuppertaler SV Borussia in May.

In January 2008, in a friendly between Fortuna Düsseldorf and Bayern Munich, Kastrati suffered a fractured testicle after colliding with Bayern's goalkeeper Bernd Dreher. He had to be brought to a hospital to undergo an emergency operation.

== International career ==
Kastrati made his debut for the Albania national team in a March 2006 friendly match against Georgia in Tirana and earned a total of two caps, scoring no goals. His second and final international was a September 2006 European Championship qualification match against Romania.
