= Maldini Kacurri =

Albanian footballer (born 2005)

Personal information
- Full name: Maldini Kacurri
- Date of birth: 4 October 2005 (age 21)
- Place of birth: Lewisham, England
- Height: 1.89 m (6 ft 2 in)
- Position: Defender

Team information
- Current team: Grimsby Town
- Number: 2

Youth career
- –2022: Fulham
- 2022–2024: Arsenal

Senior career*
| Years | Team | Apps | (Gls) |
| 2024–2026 | Arsenal | 0 | (0) |
| 2025 | → Bromley (loan) | 3 | (0) |
| 2025–2026 | → Morecambe (loan) | 18 | (1) |
| 2026– | Grimsby Town | 29 | (1) |

International career^{‡}
| 2021 | Albania U17 | 2 | (0) |
| 2023 | Albania U19 | 5 | (0) |
| 2024– | Albania U21 | 1 | (0) |
| 2025– | Albania | 1 | (0) |
- * Club domestic league appearances and goals as of 11:22, 6 November 2026 (UTC) ‡ National team caps and goals as of 4 September 2025

Maldini Kacurri (born 4 October 2005) is a footballer who plays as a defender for EFL League Two club Grimsby Town. Born in England, he plays for the Albania national team.

== Early life ==
Kacurri was born on 4 October 2005 in Lewisham, London, and was named after former AC Milan and Italy captain Paolo Maldini. His family emigrated to the UK from Albania. His family are from the city of Lezhë. He has an older sister, a younger brother, and a niece. His family is of the Catholic faith.

== Club career ==
=== Arsenal ===
Kacurri began his youth career with the youth academy of English side Fulham, before moving to Arsenal in 2022. He was described as "regular feature for the Gunners at Premier League 2 level" while playing for them.

Kacurri first started training with their senior team during the 2022–23 season. He signed his first professional contract with the club on 4 July 2024. Kacurri made his first senior matchday squad during a 1–0 win over rivals Tottenham on 15 September. On 25 September, he made his senior debut as a substitute for Riccardo Calafiori in a 5–1 win over Bolton Wanderers in the EFL Cup, becoming the first Albanian national to represent Arsenal's first team.

==== Bromley (loan) ====
On 3 February 2025, Kacurri joined League Two club Bromley on loan for the remainder of the season.

==== Morecambe (loan) ====
On 17 September 2025, Kacurri joined 5th tier Morecambe on a season long loan deal. He made his debut for on 20 September 2025, in a 4–3 victory over Wealdstone.

In November 2025, Kacurri was named Morecambe's Player of the Month for the second consecutive month after receiving more than 50% of the supporters’ votes.

=== Grimsby Town ===
On 30 January 2026, Kacurri joined League Two club Grimsby Town on a permanent transfer for an undisclosed fee, signing an 18-month contract.

Kacurri made his debut on 11 February, starting in a 1–0 home win over Accrington Stanley. He scored his first goal for the club on 25 April, opening his account with a header in a 4–0 victory over Swindon Town, which secured Grimsby's place in the EFL League Two play-offs. He was named the club's Young Player of the Year at its 2025–26 end-of-season awards. On 8 November 2026, Kacurri scored with a header in a 3–3 draw against Stafford Rangers in the FA Cup, helping Grimsby recover from a two-goal deficit before winning 3–2 on penalties to reach the second round.

== International career ==
An Albanian youth international, Kacurri made two appearances for the Albania national under-17 team before joining the Albania national under-19 team in 2023.

On 1 September 2025, Kacurri received his first senior call-up from coach Sylvinho for a friendly against Gibraltar and a 2026 FIFA World Cup qualifier against Latvia, being a replacement for Adrian Bajrami, who withdrew from the squad amid reports of switching allegiance to Switzerland.

He made his senior debut three days later against Gibraltar, starting as a centre-back and playing the full 90 minutes, while also being booked in the 48th minute for a foul challenge, as Albania kept a clean sheet in a 0–1 away win.

== Style of play ==
Kacurri mainly operates as a defender, specifically operates as a center-back. He has been described as an "unstoppable defender, combative and with a tall stature that significantly distinguishes him from his peers."

== Career statistics ==
=== Club ===
As of match played 31 October 2026

Appearances and goals by club, season and competition
| Club | Season | League | | | FA Cup | | EFL Cup | | Europe | | Other | | Total | |
| Club | Season | Division | Apps | Goals | Apps | Goals | Apps | Goals | Apps | Goals | Apps | Goals | Apps | Goals |
|---|---|---|---|---|---|---|---|---|---|---|---|---|---|---|
| Arsenal U21 | 2022–23 | — | | | — | | — | | — | | 1 (Note: Appearance(s) in EFL Trophy) | 0 | 1 | 0 |
| Arsenal U21 | 2024–25 | — | | | — | | — | | — | | 2 | 0 | 2 | 0 |
| Arsenal U21 | Arsenal U21 Total | | — | | — | | — | | — | | 3 | 0 | 3 | 0 |
| Arsenal | 2024–25 | Premier League | 0 | 0 | 0 | 0 | 1 | 0 | 0 | 0 | — | | 1 | 0 |
| Arsenal | 2025–26 | Premier League | 0 | 0 | 0 | 0 | 0 | 0 | 0 | 0 | — | | 0 | 0 |
| Arsenal | Arsenal total | | 0 | 0 | 0 | 0 | 1 | 0 | 0 | 0 | 0 | 0 | 1 | 0 |
| Bromley (loan) | 2024–25 | League Two | 3 | 0 | — | | — | | — | | — | | 3 | 0 |
| Morecambe (loan) | 2025–26 | National League | 18 | 1 | 1 | 0 | — | | — | | 0 | 0 | 19 | 1 |
| Grimsby Town | 2025–26 | League Two | 16 | 1 | 0 | 0 | — | | — | | 2 (Note: Appearance(s) in League Two Play-offs) | 0 | 18 | 1 |
| Grimsby Town | 2026–27 | League Two | 13 | 0 | 0 | 0 | 1 | 0 | — | | 2 | 0 | 16 | 0 |
| Grimsby Town | Grimsby Town total | | 29 | 1 | 0 | 0 | 1 | 0 | — | | 4 | 0 | 34 | 1 |
| Career total | | | 50 | 2 | 1 | 0 | 2 | 0 | 0 | 0 | 7 | 0 | 60 | 2 |

=== International ===
As of match played 4 September 2025

Appearances and goals by national team and year
| National team | Year | Apps | Goals |
|---|---|---|---|
| Albania | 2025 | 1 | 0 |
| Total | | 1 | 0 |

== Honours ==
Individual

- Grimsby Town Young Player of the Year: 2025-26

== See also ==
- List of Albania international footballers born outside Albania
