= David Harrington (footballer) =

Irish footballer (born 2000)

Personal information
- Full name: David Harrington
- Date of birth: 1 July 2000 (age 26)
- Place of birth: Cork, Ireland
- Height: 1.84 m (6 ft 0 in)
- Position: Goalkeeper

Team information
- Current team: Bolton Wanderers
- Number: 23

Youth career
- Cobh Ramblers
- 2018–2020: Cork City

Senior career*
Years	Team	Apps	(Gls)
2020–2023	Cork City	33	(0)
2023–2026	Fleetwood Town	21	(0)
2026–	Bolton Wanderers	0	(0)
2026	→ Grimsby Town (loan)	2	(0)
- * Club domestic league appearances and goals as of 11:02, 13 September 2026 (UTC)

David Harrington (born 1 July 2000) is an Irish professional footballer who plays as a goalkeeper for EFL Championship club Bolton Wanderers.

== Early and personal life ==
Harrington's father is Welsh former footballer Phil Harrington, who was also a goalkeeper.

== Club career ==
=== Cork City ===
Harrington began his career at Cobh Ramblers, moving to Cork City in January 2018. In August and September 2022 he was linked with a transfer to English club Everton. His proposed move to Everton was cancelled due to a shoulder injury, and in December 2022 he instead signed a pre-contract with English club Fleetwood Town. In his final year with the club, he featured 29 times helping them to promotion by winning the 2022 League of Ireland First Division.

=== Fleetwood Town ===
In January 2023 he transferred to Fleetwood Town for an undisclosed fee. Harrington cited the chance to work with Fleetwood manager Scott Brown as an influence on his decision to sign for the club, and later said that the time either side of the transfer had been "crazy". On 27 April 2024, he made his debut for the club in a 3–0 win over Burton Albion in the final game of the season after recovering from a long-term injury that kept him out of action since signing for the club.

=== Bolton Wanderers ===
On 15 January 2026, Harrington signed for Bolton Wanderers for an undisclosed fee on a two-and-a-half year contract.

On 5 September 2026, Harrington joined EFL League Two club Grimsby Town on a seven-day emergency loan before having it extended for another 7 days on 11 September 2026.

== International career ==
He was called up to the Republic of Ireland under-21 team in May 2022. On 28 May 2024, Harrington was called up as third choice keeper to the senior Republic of Ireland side for the first time by interim manager John O'Shea ahead of two friendly games against Hungary and Portugal.

Harrington qualified to play for Wales through his father, and in November 2024 he was called up to the Wales senior squad for the first time by manager Craig Bellamy for UEFA Nations League games against Turkey and Iceland.

== Career statistics ==
As of match played on 12 September 2026

Appearances and goals by club, season and competition
Club	Season	League			National cup (Note: Includes FAI Cup & FA Cup)		League cup (Note: Includes League of Ireland Cup & EFL Cup)		Other		Total	
Club	Season	Division	Apps	Goals	Apps	Goals	Apps	Goals	Apps	Goals	Apps	Goals
Cork City	2018	LOI Premier Division	0	0	0	0	0	0	0	0	0	0
Cork City	2019	LOI Premier Division	0	0	0	0	0	0	0	0	0	0
Cork City	2020	LOI Premier Division	0	0	0	0	—		2 (Note: Appearance(s) in the Munster Senior Cup)	0	2	0
Cork City	2021	LOI First Division	4	0	0	0	—		—		4	0
Cork City	2022	LOI First Division	29	0	0	0	—		—		29	0
Cork City	Total		33	0	0	0	0	0	2	0	35	0
Fleetwood Town	2022–23	EFL League One	0	0	0	0	—		—		0	0
Fleetwood Town	2023–24	EFL League One	1	0	0	0	0	0	0	0	1	0
Fleetwood Town	2024–25	EFL League Two	20	0	1	0	0	0	0	0	21	0
Fleetwood Town	2025–26	EFL League Two	0	0	3	0	1	0	4 (Note: Appearances in the EFL Trophy)	0	8	0
Fleetwood Town	Total		21	0	4	0	1	0	4	0	30	0
Bolton Wanderers	2025–26	EFL League One	0	0	0	0	0	0	0	0	0	0
Bolton Wanderers	2026–27	EFL Championship	0	0	0	0	0	0	0	0	0	0
Bolton Wanderers	Total		0	0	0	0	0	0	0	0	0	0
Grimsby Town (loan)	2026–27	EFL League Two	2	0	0	0	0	0	0	0	2	0
Career total			56	0	4	0	1	0	6	0	67	0

== Honours ==
Bolton Wanderers

- EFL League One play-offs: 2026
