= Keith Finch =

English footballer

Personal information
- Full name: Keith George Finch
- Date of birth: 6 May 1982
- Place of birth: Easington Lane, Tyne and Wear, England
- Height: 6 ft 0 in (1.83 m)
- Position: Goalkeeper

Youth career
- –: Darlington

Senior career*
Years	Team	Apps	(Gls)
1999–2002	Darlington	12	(0)
2002	Bishop Auckland		
2002–2004	Seaham Red Star		
2004–2005	Gateshead	16	(0)
2005–2006	Sunderland Nissan		
2006–2008	Seaham Red Star		
2008–2009	Spennymoor Town		
2009–2017	Shildon		
2017	West Auckland Town		
2017–2018	Sunderland RCA		
2018–2019	Easington Colliery		
- * Club domestic league appearances and goals

Keith George Finch (born 6 May 1982) is an English footballer who played as a goalkeeper. He played in the Football League for Darlington and in non-league football in the north-east of England for a variety of clubs, which included eight years with Northern League club Shildon.

== Life and career ==
Finch was born in Easington Lane, County Durham. He began his football career as a YTS trainee with Darlington. He made an unexpected debut for the club at the age of 17, in the FA Cup first round tie against Southport in October 1999, as a half-time replacement for injured goalkeeper Andy Collett. The Sunday Mirror reported that Finch produced "three super saves" to help preserve Darlington's one-goal lead. He had to wait more than two years for his first appearance in the Football League, again substituting for Collett, and this time making "a string of fine saves" as Darlington beat Lincoln City 2–1 in the Third Division. He had a run of games in the first team while Collett was returning to fitness, but when Collett suffered a collapsed lung at the beginning of March, Finch was left as the only fit goalkeeper at the club. The last of Finch's 12 league appearances was in a defeat to York City on 16 March. Later that month, Darlington signed Chris Porter on a pay-as-you-play basis, though with owner George Reynolds unwilling to pay, a fans' website raised money to cover Porter's wages. Finch was one of several players to be released when their contracts expired at the end of the season.

He signed for Northern Premier League club Bishop Auckland, but his time there was interrupted by injury and he was released in early November. Finch then moved into the Northern League with Seaham Red Star, returning to the Northern Premier with Gateshead in October 2004. After five months and 23 appearances, 16 in the league, he left. He spent time with Northern League Sunderland Nissan, before returning to Seaham for two seasons, in the first of which he was player of the year as the club were promoted as runners-up to the Northern League Premier Division. His next port of call was Spennymoor Town: no sooner had he saved a penalty and scored his own in the shootout that took his team through to the last 16 of the 2008–09 FA Vase, than he was transfer-listed and sold to Shildon after Spennymoor received an unexpected bill. He helped the club reach the semi-final of the 2012–13 FA Vase, in which they lost to Tunbridge Wells, and continued as goalkeeping coach and increasingly occasional player until manager Gary Forrest and his staff left the club in January 2017. Finch followed Forrest to West Auckland Town at the end of the season, but moved on to Sunderland RCA early in 2017–18, and spent the 2018–19 season with Easington Colliery.

Finch played in goal as Hetton Lyons won the FA Sunday Cup in 2008, 2010 and 2012. He has also been involved with youth football club Hetton Juniors as coach and chairman.
