= Géza Dávid Turi =

Faroese footballer

Personal information
- Full name: Géza Dávid Turi
- Date of birth: 6 October 2001 (age 25)
- Place of birth: Zalaegerszeg, Hungary
- Height: 1.84 m (6 ft 0 in)
- Position: Midfielder

Team information
- Current team: Grimsby Town
- Number: 15

Youth career
- –2020: Víkingur

Senior career*
Years	Team	Apps	(Gls)
2020–2025	Víkingur	118	(8)
2025–	Grimsby Town	46	(3)

International career^{‡}
2025–	Faroe Islands	15	(2)
- * Club domestic league appearances and goals as of 07:55, 10 November 2026 (UTC) ‡ National team caps and goals as of 16 November 2026

Géza Dávid Turi (born 6 October 2001) is a professional footballer who plays as a midfielder for EFL League Two side Grimsby Town. Born in Hungary, he plays for the Faroe Islands national team.

== Club career ==
=== Vikingur ===
Turi began his career at Víkingur Gøta in 2020, having come through the club's youth academy. In 2024, Turi scored 8 goals for Vikingur, and was named the midfielder of the year in the Faroe Islands Premier League. He was also named the league's player of the month for March and April. Vikingur would go on to win the league that season.

=== Grimsby Town ===
In January 2025, Vikingur accepted a 700,000 kroner bid from English club Grimsby Town for him, and the transfer was completed later that month.

Upon completion of Turi's visa application, he began training with his new club on 18th February 2025. On March 11th, he made his full debut for Grimsby in a league game against Notts County.

He made his competitive debut on 11 March, starting in midfield during a 2–0 home defeat by Notts County.

Turi became increasingly involved during the 2025–26 season, making 40 appearances and providing three assists as Grimsby reached the League Two play-offs. On 27 August 2025, he converted a penalty during Grimsby's shootout victory over Manchester United in the second round of the EFL Cup. Grimsby won the shootout 12–11 after the match finished 2–2.

On 12 September 2026, he scored his first goal for the club with a strike from approximately 30 yards during a 2–0 home victory over Bristol Rovers. The goal, scored on his 52nd Grimsby appearance, was also his first in English football.

On 16 September 2026, Turi signed a new contract with Grimsby until the summer of 2028, with an option for a further year.

== International career ==
Turi received his Faroe Islands passport in 2025, making him eligible to represent them internationally and move abroad. Prior to this, he was called up to the Faroe Islands national under-21 football team in 2021, but never made an appearance.

In March 2025, Turi was called up to the national team for their FIFA World Cup qualification matches against Czech Republic and Montenegro. He was called up again in September, and made his debut for the Faroe Islands on September 5, 2025, as they lost 1-0 to Croatia. He scored his first goal for the Faroes on November 14, 2025, in a 3-1 loss to Croatia.

== Personal life ==
His father is former footballer Géza Turi.

== Career statistics ==
=== Club ===
As of match played 12 September 2026

Appearances and goals by club, season and competition
Clubs	Season	League			National Cup		League Cup		Europe		Other		Total	
Clubs	Season	League	Apps	Goals	Apps	Goals	Apps	Goals	Apps	Goals	Apps	Goals	Apps	Goals
Vikingur	2020	Faroe Islands Premier League	14	0	2	0	—		—		—		16	2
Vikingur	2021	Faroe Islands Premier League	27	0	2	0	—		—		—		29	0
Vikingur	2022	Faroe Islands Premier League	25	0	3	0	—		4 (Note: Appearance(s) in UEFA Champions League)	0	—		32	0
Vikingur	2023	Faroe Islands Premier League	26	3	1	0	—		2	0	1	0	30	3
Vikingur	2024	Faroe Islands Premier League	26	5	3	0	—		4	0	—		33	5
Vikingur	Total		118	8	11	0	—		10	0	1	0	140	10
Grimsby Town	2024–25	League Two	4	0	—		—		—		—		4	0
Grimsby Town	2025–26	League Two	30	0	4	0	3	0	—		3	0	40	0
Grimsby Town	2026–27	League Two	12	3	1	1	1	0	—		0	0	14	3
Grimsby Town	Total		46	3	5	1	4	0	—		3	0	58	4
Career total			162	11	16	1	4	0	10	0	4	0	198	12

=== International ===
As of 16 November 2026

Appearances and goals by national team and year
National team	Year	Apps	Goals
Faroe Islands	2025	6	1
Faroe Islands	2026	9	1
Total		15	2

List of international goals scored by Géza Dávid Turi
No.	Date	Venue	Opponent	Score	Result	Competition
1.	14 November 2025	Stadion Rujevica, Rijeka, Croatia	Croatia	1–0	1–3	2026 FIFA World Cup qualification
2.	6 October 2026	Astana Arena, Astana, Kazakhstan	Kazakhstan	2–0	2–2	2026–27 UEFA Nations League C
