= Iwan Morgan =

Welsh footballer

Personal information
- Full name: Iwan Thomas Morgan
- Date of birth: 29 January 2006 (age 20)
- Place of birth: Cardiff, Wales
- Height: 1.81 m (5 ft 11 in)
- Position: Forward

Team information
- Current team: Grimsby Town
- Number: 9

Youth career
- –2020: Cardiff City
- 2020–2023: Swansea City
- 2023–2026: Brentford

Senior career*
Years	Team	Apps	(Gls)
2026	Brentford	0	(0)
2026	→ Shrewsbury Town (loan)	21	(3)
2026–	Grimsby Town	14	(3)

International career
2023	Wales U17	8	(10)
2023–2024	Wales U19	6	(1)
- * Club domestic league appearances and goals as of 17:01, 31 October 2026 2026 (UTC)

Iwan Thomas Morgan (born 29 January 2006) is a Welsh professional footballer who plays as a forward for EFL League Two club Grimsby Town.

Morgan is a product of the Cardiff City and Swansea City academies and began his professional career with Brentford B in 2023. He played his first senior football on loan for Shrewsbury Town and he transferred to Grimsby Town in 2026. Morgan was capped at youth level by Wales.

== Club career ==
=== Early years ===
A forward, Morgan began his youth career with a 9-year spell in the Cardiff City Academy. In August 2020, he transferred to the Swansea City Academy. Morgan signed early scholarship forms with the club in 2021 and began his scholarship in earnest in July 2022. Following a 2022–23 season in which he scored 28 goals in all competitions for the U18 team, Morgan turned down the offer of a professional contract and departed the club on 1 September 2023. The compensation fee received was Swansea City's club record for a player not signed to a professional contract.

=== Brentford ===
On 1 September 2023, Morgan signed a three-year contract with the B team at Premier League club Brentford, for a compensation fee. By early February 2024, Morgan's B and U18 performances were such that he was rewarded with a new 3 1/2-year contract. He tied with Ashley Hay as top scorer for the B team during the 2023–24 season, with 9 goals.

Morgan was included in the first team squad for its 2024–25 pre-season training camp in Portugal and he made five friendly appearances during the pre-season period. He was an unused substitute in six first team matchday squads during the regular season. Following the departure of Ashley Hay and Kyreece Lisbie during the winter transfer window, Morgan moved from the left wing to reassume the role as the B team's centre forward. He scored 25 goals in 42 B team appearances during the 2024–25 season and was a part of the Professional Development League-winning squad.

Morgan made one first team friendly appearance during the 2025–26 pre-season and played for the B team during the first half of the regular season, scoring seven goals. On 1 January 2026, Morgan joined League Two club Shrewsbury Town on loan until the end of the 2025–26 season. He was deployed in a variety of attacking roles and made 22 appearances during his spell, scoring three goals.

Morgan was involved in the Brentford first team squad during the 2026–27 pre-season, scoring in a friendly and being included in the party for a training camp in Portugal. He transferred out of the club in August 2026.

=== Grimsby Town ===
On 7 August 2026, Morgan transferred to League Two club Grimsby Town and signed a three-year contract for an undisclosed fee. His arrival followed Grimsby's sale of striker Jaze Kabia to Leyton Orient earlier that day.

Morgan made his competitive debut the following day, replacing Justin Amaluzor during a 3–1 defeat by Blackpool in the first round of the EFL Cup. He made his first start for the club on 1 September in a 2–2 League Two draw away to Accrington Stanley.

Early in his spell, Morgan credited changes to his training and diet at the club with helping him lose weight and improve his fitness. He scored his first Grimsby goal on 19 September, converting a penalty in a 2–0 home victory over Crawley Town. He also assisted Kieran Green for the second goal.

== International career ==
Morgan was capped by Wales at U17 and U19 level. He scored 10 goals in eight appearances at U17 level, which included two goals in three appearances at the 2023 European U17 Championship.

== Style of play ==
As a forward, Morgan has "a dogged nature out of possession, a willingness to run in behind and clever movement inside the box to fashion an opportunity". Strengths are his "receiving the ball to feet, bringing team-mates into play and a capability to drive with the ball into advanced positions from deep".

== Personal life ==
Morgan attended Ysgol Bro Edern in Cardiff. While a Brentford B player, he lived in digs with teammate Riley Owen in Richmond.

== Career statistics ==
As of match played 31 October 2026

Appearances and goals by club, season and competition
Club	Season	League			FA Cup		EFL Cup		Other		Total	
Club	Season	Division	Apps	Goals	Apps	Goals	Apps	Goals	Apps	Goals	Apps	Goals
Brentford	2024–25	Premier League	0	0	0	0	0	0	―		0	0
Shrewsbury Town (loan)	2025–26	League Two	21	3	1	0	―		―		22	3
Grimsby Town	2026–27	League Two	14	3	0	0	1	0	1	0	16	3
Career total			35	6	1	0	1	0	1	0	38	6
