= Giacomo Poselli =

Albanian footballer

Personal information
- Full name: Giacomo Poselli
- Date of birth: 22 July 1922
- Place of birth: Thessaloniki, Greece
- Date of death: 30 August 2007 (aged 85)
- Place of death: Italy
- Position: Goalkeeper

Senior career*
Years	Team	Apps	(Gls)
1946–1948	Flamurtari		
1948–1949	17 Nentori Tiranë		

International career
1946–1948	Albania	8	(0)
- * Club domestic league appearances and goals

Giacomo Poselli (Albanian: Xhakom Pozelli; 22 July 1922 — 30 August 2007) was a footballer. Born in Greece, he was the first foreign-born player to play for the Albania national team.

== Club career ==
Born in Thessaloniki, Greece into an Italian family, he moved to Albania in 1932 with his family. His father was a building contractor, he obtained important building contracts in Gjirokastër and Vlorë. Giacomo then went on to play for Flamurtari Vlorë before becoming a naturalized Albanian citizen in order to compete in the 1946 Balkan Cup, which Albania won. Totally, has made 8 appearances for Albania, but only 7 are considered official games.

== International career ==
He made his debut for Albania in an August 1946 friendly match against Montenegro and earned a total of eight caps, scoring no goals. His final international was a June 1948 Balkan Cup match against Yugoslavia.

== Personal life ==
His brother in law, Giuseppe Terrusi, an Italo-Albanian bank director in Vlorë was arrested in retaliation in 1945 under the order of Enver Hoxha, who as a student had previously been in love with but was rejected by Terrusi's wife, Aurelia Poselli. Terrusi, allegedly innocent, was arrested in 1945 on charges of embezzlement and died in prison of Burrel in 1952. The family Poselli / Terrusi returned to Italy as refugees in 1949.

His true identity was hidden and masked by the Communist Party, who led the public to believe that he was indeed Albanian–born and was often referred to as Buzeli and Poselli. In December 2012, his story was reinstated into the Albanian Football Association museum.

The true family history Poselli / Terrusi was narrated in the book by Aldo Renato Terrusi: "Ritorno al Paese delle Aquile". The book was translated into Albanian under the title: "Brenga ime shqiptare".
