= 2025–26 Grimsby Town F.C. season =

148th season in existence of Grimsby Town FC

Grimsby Town F.C.
2025–26 season
- Owner: 1878 Partners (63.1%), The Mariners Trust (13.5%), Other Shareholders (12.9%), Mike Parker (10.5%)
- Chairman: Andrew Pettit
- Manager: David Artell
- Stadium: Blundell Park
- League Two: 7th
- FA Cup: Fourth Round
- EFL Cup: Fourth Round
- EFL Trophy: Group Stage
- Top goalscorer: League: Jaze Kabia (18); All: Jaze Kabia (23)
- Highest home attendance: 8,747 vs Manchester United (27 August 2025, EFL Cup)
- Lowest home attendance: 404 vs Everton U21 (4 November 2025, EFL Trophy)
- Average home league attendance: 6,537
- Biggest win: 7-1 vs Cheltenham Town (H) (27 September 2025, League Two)
- Biggest defeat: 5-0 vs Brentford (H) (28 October 2025, EFL Cup)
Home colours	Away colours	Third colours

The 2025–26 season is the 148th season in the history of Grimsby Town Football Club and their fourth consecutive season in League Two. In addition to the domestic league, the club would also participate in the FA Cup, the EFL Cup, and the EFL Trophy.

== Transfers and contracts ==
=== In ===
Date	Pos.	Player	From	Fee	Ref.
1 July 2025 (Note: The transfer was announced on 3 June, and would become official on July 1 once his contract at Altrincham had expired)	RW	Justin Amaluzor (ENG)	Altrincham (ENG)	Bosman	
1 July 2025 (Note: The transfer was announced on 19 June, and would become official on July 1 once his contract at Spennymoor had expired)	LB	Reece Staunton (IRL)	Spennymoor Town (ENG)	Bosman	
1 July 2025 (Note: The transfer was announced on 25 June, and would become official on July 1 once his contract at Bradford had expired)	AM	Jamie Walker (SCO)	Bradford City (ENG)	Bosman	
1 July 2025 (Note: The transfer was announced on 30 June, and would become official on July 1 once his contract at Leyton Orient had expired)	LB	Jayden Sweeney (ENG)	Leyton Orient (ENG)	Bosman	
1 July 2025	ST	Jaze Kabia (IRL)	Truro City (ENG)	Undisclosed	
2 July 2025	AM	Zak Gilsenan (IRL)	Blackburn Rovers (ENG)	Bosman	
9 July 2025	GK	Christy Pym (NIR)	Mansfield Town (ENG)	Bosman	
25 July 2025	CB	Samuel Lavelle (ENG)	Carlisle United (ENG)	Bosman	
11 August 2025	ST	Jude Soonsup-Bell (THA)	Córdoba (ESP)	Bosman	
30 January 2026	CB	Maldini Kacurri (ALB)	Arsenal (ENG)	Undisclosed	

=== Out ===
Date	Pos.	Player	To	Fee	Ref.
30 June 2025	GK	Jordan Wright (ENG)	Newport County (WAL)	Free	
19 January 2026	CF	Danny Rose (ENG)	Barrow (ENG)	Undisclosed	

=== Loaned in ===
Date	Pos.	Player	From	Date until	Ref.
26 August 2025	LW	Clarke Oduor (KEN)	Bradford City (ENG)	End of season	
1 September 2025	RB	Neo Eccleston (ENG)	Huddersfield Town (ENG)	7 January 2026 (Note: On 7 January, Eccleston's season-long loan from Huddersfied was terminated)	
2 September 2025	GK	Charlie Casper (ENG)	Burnley (ENG)	5 January 2026 (Note: On 5 January, Casper's season-long loan from Burnley was terminated)	
20 November 2025	GK	Richard O'Donnell (ENG)	Derby County (ENG)	26 November 2025	
20 December 2025	GK	Jackson Smith (ENG)	Barnsley (ENG)	End of season (Note: On 27 December, Smith's loan from Barnsley was extended by a further seven days. And again on 1 January. On 8 January, he signed a new loan deal until the end of the season.)	
9 January 2026	ST	Tyrell Sellars-Fleming (ENG)	Hull City (ENG)	End of season	
12 January 2026	ST	Andy Cook (ENG)	Bradford City (ENG)	End of season	

=== Loaned out ===
Date	Pos.	Player	To	Date until	Ref.
12 September 2025	GK	(England) Seb Auton	(England) Grimsby Borough	1 January 2026 (Note: On 14 October, Auton's loan was extended until January)	
17 January 2026	AM	(Republic of Ireland) Zak Gilsenan	(England) Buxton	4 March 2026 (Note: Loan was originally until the end of the season, however Gilsenan was recalled on 4 March)	
28 January 2026	CM	(England) Henry Brown	(England) Gainsborough Trinity	3 April 2026 (Note: On 25 February, Brown's loan was extended until the end of the season. But on 3 April he was recalled)	
4 March 2026	AM	(Republic of Ireland) Zak Gilsenan	(England) Gateshead	3 April 2026 (Note: On 3 April, Gilsenan was recalled from his loan at Gateshead)	

=== Released / Out of Contract ===
Date	Pos.	Player	Subsequent club	Join date	Ref.
30 June 2025	CB	Lewis Cass (ENG)	Harrogate Town (ENG)	1 July 2025	
30 June 2025	CF	Donovan Wilson (ENG)	Dagenham & Redbridge (ENG)	1 July 2025	
30 June 2025	CF	(England) Charlie Clements	Cleethorpes Town (ENG)	1 July 2025	
30 June 2025	LB	Denver Hume (ENG)	Fleetwood Town (ENG)	1 July 2025	
30 June 2025	GK	Jake Eastwood (ENG)	Cambridge United (ENG)	10 July 2025	
30 June 2025	CM	Harvey Cribb (ENG)	Lincoln United (ENG)	25 July 2025	
30 June 2025	CM	Curtis Thompson (ENG)	Spalding United (ENG)	30 July 2025	
30 June 2025	CF	Rekeil Pyke (ENG)	Truro City (ENG)	31 July 2025	
30 June 2025	CM	Callum Ainley (ENG)	Cleethorpes Town (ENG)	2 September 2025	
10 September 2025	LB	Matty Carson (ENG)	Boston United (ENG)	12 September 2025	

=== New Contract ===
Date	Pos.	Player	Length	End date	Ref.
30 May 2025	GK	(England) Seb Auton	1 year	30 June 2026	
30 May 2025	CM	(England) Henry Brown	2 years	30 June 2027	
5 December 2025	CB	(England) Doug Tharme	2.5 years	30 June 2028	
2 February 2026	CB	(England) Cameron McJannet	1.5 years	30 June 2027	
2 March 2026	LW	(England) Charles Vernam	1.5 years	30 June 2027	
27 March 2026	CB	(England) Harvey Rodgers	2.5 years	30 June 2028	

== First-team Squad ==
As of 3 April 2026

No.	Name	Position	Nationality	Place of birth	Date of birth (age)	Signed from	Date signed	Fee	Contract end
Goalkeepers
1	Christy Pym	GK	(Northern Ireland)	Exeter	24 April 1995 (age 31)	Mansfield Town	9 July 2025	Free	30 June 2027
31	Jackson Smith	GK	(England)	Telford	14 October 2001 (age 25)	Barnsley	20 December 2025	Loan	30 June 2026
41	Seb Auton	GK	(England)	Kingston Upon Hull	17 November 2006 (age 19)	Academy	30 May 2025	Trainee	30 June 2026
Defenders
2	Maldini Kacurri	CB	(Albania)	Lewisham	4 October 2005 (age 21)	Arsenal	30 January 2026	Undisclosed	30 June 2027
3	Jayden Sweeney	LB	(England)	Camden	4 December 2001 (age 24)	Leyton Orient	1 July 2025	Free	30 June 2027
5	Harvey Rodgers	CB	(England)	Selby	20 October 1996 (age 30)	Accrington Stanley	1 July 2023	Free	30 June 2028
6	Samuel Lavelle	CB	(England)	Blackpool	3 October 1996 (age 30)	Carlisle United	25 July 2025	Free	30 June 2027
16	Reece Staunton	LB	(Republic of Ireland)	Bradford	10 December 2001 (age 24)	Spennymoor Town	1 July 2025	Free	30 June 2027
17	Cameron McJannet	CB	(England)	Milton Keynes	6 September 1998 (age 28)	Derry City	20 June 2024	Undisclosed	30 June 2027
21	Tyrell Warren	RB	(England)	Manchester	5 October 1998 (age 28)	Barrow	1 July 2024	Free	30 June 2026
24	Doug Tharme	CB	(England)	Birkenhead	17 August 1999 (age 27)	Blackpool	12 January 2024	Undisclosed	30 June 2028
Midfielders
4	Kieran Green	CM	(England)	Stockton-on-Tees	30 June 1997 (age 29)	FC Halifax Town	15 July 2022	Undisclosed	30 June 2027
7	Jamie Walker	AM	(Scotland)	Edinburgh	25 June 1993 (age 33)	Bradford City	1 July 2025	Free	30 June 2027
8	Evan Khouri	CM	(England)	London	21 January 2003 (age 23)	West Ham United	7 July 2019	Free	30 June 2026
11	Jason Daði Svanþórsson	RW	(Iceland)	Mosfellsbær	31 December 1999 (age 26)	Breiðablik	9 July 2024	Undisclosed	30 June 2026
14	Justin Amaluzor	RW	(England)	Southwark	17 October 1996 (age 30)	Altrincham	1 July 2025	Free	30 June 2027
15	Géza Dávid Turi	CM	(Faroe Islands)	Zalaegerszeg	6 October 2001 (age 25)	Víkingur	31 January 2025	Undisclosed	30 June 2027
18	Darragh Burns	RW	(Republic of Ireland)	Stamullen	6 August 2002 (age 24)	MK Dons	26 January 2025	Undisclosed	30 June 2028
19	Zak Gilsenan	AM	(Republic of Ireland)	Joondalup	8 May 2003 (age 22)	Blackburn Rovers	2 July 2025	Free	30 June 2027
20	George McEachran	CM	(England)	Oxford	30 August 2000 (age 26)	Swindon Town	4 July 2024	Free	30 June 2026
23	Henry Brown	CM	(England)	Louth	20 April 2007 (age 18)	Academy	30 May 2025	Trainee	30 June 2027
29	Clarke Oduor	LW	(Kenya)	Siaya	25 June 1999 (age 27)	Bradford City	26 August 2025	Loan	30 June 2026
30	Charles Vernam	LW	(England)	Lincoln	8 October 1996 (age 30)	Lincoln City	20 June 2023	Undisclosed	30 June 2027
Forwards
9	Jaze Kabia	ST	(Republic of Ireland)	Cork	7 August 2000 (age 26)	Truro City	1 July 2025	Undisclosed	30 June 2027
10	Jude Soonsup-Bell	ST	(Thailand)	Chippenham	10 January 2004 (age 22)	Córdoba	11 August 2025	Free	30 June 2026
22	Cameron Gardner	ST	(Scotland)	Newcastle-Upon-Tyne	22 September 2005 (age 21)	Academy	22 September 2023	Trainee	30 June 2028
39	Andy Cook	ST	(England)	Bishop Auckland	18 October 1990 (age 36)	Bradford City	12 January 2026	Loan	30 June 2026
40	Tyrell Sellars-Fleming	ST	(England)	Lincoln	31 May 2005 (age 21)	Hull City	9 January 2026	Loan	30 June 2026
Players departed midseason
12	Neo Eccleston	RB	(England)	Hammersmith and Fulham	11 October 2003 (age 23)	Huddersfield Town	1 September 2025	Loan	7 January 2026
32	Danny Rose	ST	(England)	Barnsley	10 December 1993 (age 32)	Stevenage	14 June 2023	Undisclosed	19 January 2026
33	Charlie Casper	GK	(England)	Bury	4 April 2005 (age 21)	Burnley	2 September 2025	Loan	5 January 2026
38	Richard O'Donnell	GK	(England)	Sheffield	12 September 1988 (age 38)	Derby County	20 November 2025	Emergency Loan	26 November 2025

== Pre-season and friendlies ==
On 14 May, Grimsby Town announced they would kick-off pre-season with a trip to Cleethorpes Town. Five days later, a second fixture was added to the schedule, against Grimsby Borough. On 3 June, the third pre-season friendly away to Gainsborough Trinity was announced. One day later, three more games were added, an away fixture against Rochdale, a game away at Boston United and a home game against Peterborough United. On the following day, the final pre-season game was announced, versus Lincoln City.

Win Draw Loss Fixtures

5 July 2025 Friendly	Cleethorpes Town	0–1	Grimsby Town	Grimsby
14:00 BST		Report	Rose 56'	Stadium: Myenergi Stadium

8 July 2025 Friendly	Grimsby Borough	1–1	Grimsby Town	Grimsby
19:00 BST	Sawyer 13'	Report	Taylor 5' (o.g.)	Stadium: The Bradley Football Development Centre

12 July 2025 Friendly	Hull City	1–0	Grimsby Town	Cottingham
15:00 BST	Sellars-Fleming 76'	Report		Stadium: Cottingham Training Ground; Attendance: 0 (behind-closed-doors)

15 July 2025 Friendly	Gainsborough Trinity	1−1	Grimsby Town	Gainsborough
19:30 BST	Tuntulwana 54'		Green 16'	Stadium: The Northolme

19 July 2025 Friendly	Rochdale	2–0	Grimsby Town	Rochdale
15:00 BST	Dieseruvwe 24'; Rodney 90+2'	Report		Stadium: Spotland Stadium; Attendance: 1,174

22 July 2025 Friendly	Grimsby Town	2−1	Lincoln City	Cleethorpes
19:00 BST	Burns 15'; Vernam 32'	Report	Hackett 76'	Stadium: Blundell Park; Attendance: 2,143

23 July 2025 Friendly	Boston United	1−2	Grimsby Town XI	Boston
19:30 BST	Norkett 90+1'		Amaluzor 12'; Staunton 60'	Stadium: Boston Community Stadium

26 July 2025 Friendly	Grimsby Town	3–2	Peterborough United	Cleethorpes
15:00 BST	Kabia 15'; Vernam 38'; Sweeney 90'	Report	Hayes 74'; Fox 85'	Stadium: Blundell Park; Attendance: 1,814

== Competitions ==
=== League Two ===
==== League table ====
Pos	Team	Pld	W	D	L	GF	GA	GD	Pts	Promotion, qualification or relegation
5	Notts County (O, P)	46	24	8	14	74	52	+22	80	Qualification for League Two play-offs
6	Chesterfield	46	21	16	9	71	56	+15	79	Qualification for League Two play-offs
7	Grimsby Town	46	22	12	12	74	50	+24	78	Qualification for League Two play-offs
8	Barnet	46	21	13	12	70	53	+17	76	
9	Swindon Town	46	22	9	15	70	59	+11	75	

Source: EFL Official Website
Rules for classification: 1) Points; 2) Goal difference; 3) Number of goals scored; 4) Head-to-head results; 5) Wins; 6) Away goals; 7) Penalty points (sec 9.5); 8) 12-point sending off offences
(O) Play-off winners; (P) Promoted

==== Results summary ====
Overall								Home						Away					
Pld	W	D	L	GF	GA	GD	Pts	W	D	L	GF	GA	GD	W	D	L	GF	GA	GD
46	22	12	12	74	50	+24	78	12	5	6	41	22	+19	10	7	6	33	28	+5

Last updated: complete.
Source: Soccerway

==== Results by round ====
Round	1	2	3	4	5	6	7	8	9	10	11	12	13	14	15	16	17	18	19	20	21	22	23	24	27	28	29	30	31	32	33	34	35	26^{2}	36	37	38	39	41	42	43	40^{3}	44	25^{1}	45	46
Ground	H	A	H	A	A	H	A	H	A	H	A	H	H	A	A	H	A	H	A	H	A	H	H	A	H	A	A	H	A	H	H	A	A	H	H	A	H	H	A	A	H	A	H	A	H	A
Result	W	D	W	W	D	L	W	D	L	W	W	L	W	L	D	L	D	L	D	L	L	D	W	W	W	W	W	D	D	W	D	L	W	W	D	L	W	W	L	W	W	L	W	W	W	D
Position	1	5	4	2	4	8	4	5	5	5	3	5	3	6	6	10	9	12	13	14	14	16	15	12	11	10	9	9	12	8	10	11	11	8	7	8	7	7	10	10	8	8	8	7	6	7
Points	3	4	7	10	11	11	14	15	15	18	21	21	24	24	25	25	26	26	27	27	27	28	31	34	37	40	43	44	45	48	49	49	52	55	56	56	59	62	62	65	68	68	71	74	77	78

Source: EFL
A = Away; H = Home; W = Win; D = Draw; L = Loss; P = Postponed
Notes:
- ^{1} Matchday 25 (vs. Cambridge United) was postponed due to a frozen pitch, and then again due to international call-ups.
- ^{2} Matchday 26 (vs. Salford City) was rearranged due to both teams' appearance in the FA Cup.
- ^{3} Matchday 40 (vs. Chesterfield) was postponed due to international call-ups.

==== Matches ====
On 26 June, the League Two fixtures were announced.

Win Draw Loss Fixtures

2 August 2025 1	Grimsby Town	3–0	Crawley Town	Cleethorpes
15:00 BST	Kabia 10' (pen.); McJannet 30'; Khouri 64'	Report	Scott (yellow card) 29'; Conroy (yellow card) 90'	Stadium: Blundell Park; Attendance: 6,806; Referee: Scott Jackson

9 August 2025 2	Harrogate Town	3–3	Grimsby Town	Harrogate
15:00 BST	Bradbury (yellow card) 7'; Duke-Mckenna (yellow card) 11'; Burrell (yellow card) 15'; Smith 59'; Taylor 72' (pen.); McAleny 77', (yellow card) 88'; O'Connor (yellow card) 90+5'	Report	Rodgers (yellow card) 38', (goal) 85'; Burns (yellow card) 51'; Vernam 69'; Kabia 90+3'; Gardner (yellow card) 90+6'	Stadium: Wetherby Road; Attendance: 3,562; Referee: William Davis

16 August 2025 3	Grimsby Town	2–1	Newport County	Cleethorpes
15:00 BST	Baker-Richardon 1' (o.g.); Kabia (penalty missed) 19', (yellow card) 45+1'; Amaluzor (yellow card) 62'; Green 90+4'	Report	Smith (yellow card) 8'; Whitmore (yellow card) 30'; Evans (yellow card) 36'; Baker 55'	Stadium: Blundell Park; Attendance: 6,402; Referee: Zac Kennard-Kettle

19 August 2025 4	Walsall	0–1	Grimsby Town	Walsall
20:00 BST	Cox (yellow card) 75'; Roberts (yellow card) 90+6'	Report	Sweeney (yellow card) 32'; Khouri 68'; McEachran (yellow card) 89'	Stadium: Bescot Stadium; Attendance: 5,619; Referee: Matthew Corlett
Note: Fixture was initially scheduled for 19:45, but was moved for live Sky Sports broadcast.

23 August 2025 5	Accrington Stanley	1–1	Grimsby Town	Accrington
15:00 BST	Bauress (yellow card) 21'; Walton 65', (yellow card) 75'; Love (yellow card) 71'; Sinclair (yellow card) 88'; Henderson (yellow card) 90'	Report	Kabia 26', (penalty missed) 50'	Stadium: Crown Ground; Attendance: 2,647; Referee: Ross Martin

30 August 2025 6	Grimsby Town	0–1	Bristol Rovers	Cleethorpes
15:00 BST	Amaluzor (yellow card) 25'	Report	Southam-Hales 27'; Łopata (yellow card) 39'; Kilgour (yellow card) 58'	Stadium: Blundell Park; Attendance: 7,406; Referee: Neil Hair

6 September 2025 7	Milton Keynes Dons	2–3	Grimsby Town	Milton Keynes
15:00 BST	Offord (yellow card) 8'; Mellish (red card) 36'; McEachran 47' (o.g.); Kelly (yellow card) 74'; Lemonheigh-Evans 90+1'	Report	Green 9'; Kabia 23'; Vernam 29'; McEachran (yellow card) 86'	Stadium: Stadium MK; Attendance: 7,758; Referee: Oliver Mackey

13 September 2025 8	Grimsby Town	1–1	Cambridge United	Cleethorpes
15:00 BST	McEachran (yellow card) 39'; Kabia (yellow card) 45+4', (penalty missed) 90+7'; Sweeney (yellow card) 54'; Amaluzor 90+7'	Report	Purrington (yellow card) 16'; Mayor 31'; Mpanzu (yellow card) 50'; Gibbons (yellow card) 84'; Brophy (yellow card) 90+4'	Stadium: Blundell Park; Attendance: 7,147; Referee: Greg Rollason

20 September 2025 9	Barnet	3–0	Grimsby Town	Edgware
15:00 BST	Collinge (yellow card) 22'; Shelton (yellow card) 28'; Ofoborh 42', 68'; Ndlovu 65'	Report		Stadium: The Hive Stadium; Attendance: 3,260; Referee: Ben Atkinson

27 September 2025 10	Grimsby Town	7–1	Cheltenham Town	Cleethorpes
15:00 BST	Walker 39', 41'; Kabia 54'; Sweeney 59', 80'; Vernam 62'; Khouri 84'	Report	Kinsella (yellow card) 12'; Hutchinson 19', (yellow card) 55'; Pell (yellow card) 41' (yellow-red card) 45'; Angol (yellow card) 45+4' (yellow-red card) 51'	Stadium: Blundell Park; Attendance: 6,315; Referee: Carl Brook

4 October 2025 11	Salford City	0–2	Grimsby Town	Salford
15:00 BST	Ashley (yellow card) 40'; Butcher (yellow card) 45'; Cooper (yellow card) 63'	Report	Khouri 1'; McJannet (yellow card) 19'; Vernam 31'; Rose (yellow card) 82'; Warren (yellow card) 90+1'	Stadium: Moor Lane; Attendance: 3,608; Referee: Stephen Parkinson

11 October 2025 12	Grimsby Town	1–2	Colchester United	Cleethorpes
15:00 BST	Green 18', (yellow card) 86'; McEachran (yellow card) 25'; Khouri (yellow card) 27'	Report	Tucker (yellow card) 27'; Payne (yellow card) 33'; Iandolo (yellow card) 35'; Mbick 38', 60'; Read (yellow card) 50'	Stadium: Blundell Park; Attendance: 6,931; Referee: James Bell

18 October 2025 13	Grimsby Town	1–0	Gillingham	Cleethorpes
15:00 BST	Kabia (yellow card) 27'; Green (yellow card) 50'; Rodgers (yellow card) 55'; Vernam 58' (pen.)	Report	Hutton (red card) 33'; Williams (yellow card) 60' (yellow-red card) 63'; Coleman (yellow card) 66'; Little (yellow card) 66'; Gale (yellow card) 83'; Clark (yellow card) 84'	Stadium: Blundell Park; Attendance: 6,659; Referee: Zac Kennard-Kettle

25 October 2025 14	Crewe Alexandra	3–2	Grimsby Town	Crewe
15:00 BST	Tezgel 27', 37', 87', (yellow card) 87'	Report	Walker 6', 45+1'; Sweeney (yellow card) 89'	Stadium: Gresty Road; Attendance: 5,736; Referee: Martin Coy

8 November 2025 15	Barrow	2–2	Grimsby Town	Barrow-in-Furness
15:00 GMT	Harper 44'; Hemmings (yellow card) 62'; Gordon (yellow card) 68'; McCann 74'; Newby (yellow card) 90+4'	Report	Rose 7'; Green 13', (yellow card) 80'	Stadium: Holker Street; Attendance: 3,159; Referee: Jamie O'Connor

15 November 2025 16	Grimsby Town	0–1	Chesterfield	Cleethorpes
15:00 GMT	Warren (yellow card) 29'; Pym (red card) 55'; Kabia (yellow card) 56'	Report	Dunkley (yellow card) 32'; Rodgers 72' (o.g.); Darcy (yellow card) 79'; Bonis (yellow card) 90+1'	Stadium: Blundell Park; Attendance: 7,407; Referee: Martin Woods

22 November 2025 17	Swindon Town	2–2	Grimsby Town	Swindon
15:00 GMT	Palmer 7'; Bodin 13'; Kilkenny (yellow card) 40'; Tabor (yellow card) 79'	Report	Green 22'; Rose 41'; Turi (yellow card) 67'; McEachran (yellow card) 79'	Stadium: County Ground; Attendance: 8,087; Referee: Oliver Yates

27 November 2025 18	Grimsby Town	1–2	Tranmere Rovers	Cleethorpes
20:00 GMT	Burns 67'	Report	Whitaker 19'; Brough (yellow card) 54'; Jennings (yellow card) 73'; Kenneh (yellow card) 87'; Dennis 90+6', (yellow card) 90+8'	Stadium: Blundell Park; Attendance: 5,565; Referee: Will Finnie
Note: Fixture was initially scheduled for 29 November, but was moved for live Sky Sports broadcast.

9 December 2025 19	Shrewsbury Town	1–1	Grimsby Town	Shrewsbury
19:45 GMT	Marquis 45+3'; Stubbs (yellow card) 78'; Aneke (yellow card) 82'	Report	Vernam 38' (pen.); Burns (yellow card) 72'; Rodgers (yellow card) 90+5'	Stadium: New Meadow; Attendance: 4,389; Referee: Scott Oldham

13 December 2025 20	Grimsby Town	0–2	Notts County	Cleethorpes
15:00 GMT	McJannet (yellow card) 41'	Report	Platt (yellow card) 26'; Dennis 58'; Roos (yellow card) 79'; Jatta 90+3', (yellow card) 90+4'	Stadium: Blundell Park; Attendance: 7,082; Referee: Wayne Cartmel

20 December 2025 21	Bromley	2–0	Grimsby Town	Bromley
12:30 GMT	Hondermarck 12', 55'; Charles (yellow card) 62'; Pinnock (yellow card) 71'	Report	Walker (yellow card) 38'; McEachran (yellow card) 45+3'; McJannet (yellow card) 84'	Stadium: Hayes Lane; Attendance: 4,427; Referee: James Durkin
Note: Fixture was initially scheduled for 15:00, but was moved for live Sky Sports broadcast.

26 December 2025 22	Grimsby Town	0–0	Oldham Athletic	Cleethorpes
15:00 GMT	McJannet (yellow card) 90+4'	Report	Garner (yellow card) 50'; Ogle (yellow card) 77'	Stadium: Blundell Park; Attendance: 7,686; Referee: Ross Joyce

29 December 2025 23	Grimsby Town	1–0	Shrewsbury Town	Cleethorpes
19:45 GMT	Tharme (yellow card) 48'; Khouri (yellow card) 68'; Amaluzor 83'	Report	Marquis (yellow card) 69'; Perry (yellow card) 90+1'	Stadium: Blundell Park; Attendance: 5,386; Referee: Steven Copeland

1 January 2026 24	Fleetwood Town	0–1	Grimsby Town	Fleetwood
15:00 GMT	Evans (yellow card) 20'; Neal (yellow card) 45+4'; McCann (yellow card) 62'	Report	Rodgers (yellow card) 53'; Burns (yellow card) 78'; Kabia 89'	Stadium: Highbury Stadium; Attendance: 3,023; Referee: Elliot Bell

17 January 2026 27	Grimsby Town	1–0	Barnet	Cleethorpes
15:00 GMT	Khouri (yellow card) 32'; Sweeney 51'	Report	Kizzi (red card) 11'; Kanu (yellow card) 28'	Stadium: Blundell Park; Attendance: 6,046; Referee: Jamie O'Connor

24 January 2026 28	Cheltenham Town	0–2	Grimsby Town	Cheltenham
15:00 GMT	Cundy (yellow card) 45+1'; Stevenson (yellow card) 57'	Report	Green 4'; Turi (yellow card) 30'; Khouri (yellow card) 45'; Rodgers (yellow card) 57'; Kabia 74'	Stadium: Whaddon Road; Attendance: 3,921; Referee: Harry Wager

27 January 2026 29	Colchester United	0–1	Grimsby Town	Colchester
19:45 GMT	Tovide (yellow card) 56'; Lisbie (yellow card) 81'; Araujo (yellow card) 90+10'	Report	Rodgers 38'; Green (yellow card) 61' (yellow-red card) 66'; Cook (yellow card) 75'	Stadium: Colchester Community Stadium; Attendance: 4,237; Referee: Ben Atkinson

31 January 2026 30	Grimsby Town	2–2	Milton Keynes Dons	Cleethorpes
12:30 GMT	Vernam (yellow card) 35'; Kabia 64', 72'	Report	Paterson 22' (pen.); Ekpiteta 28'; Offord (yellow card) 75'; Matete (yellow card) 90+8'	Stadium: Blundell Park; Attendance: 6,246; Referee: Kirsty Dowle
Note: Fixture was initially scheduled for 15:00, but was moved for live Sky Sports broadcast.

7 February 2026 31	Newport County	0–0	Grimsby Town	Newport
15:00 GMT	Opoku (penalty missed) 61'; Glennon (yellow card) 90+5'	Report	Cook (yellow card) 45+3'; Vernam (penalty missed) 74'; Rodgers (yellow card) 74'	Stadium: Rodney Parade; Attendance: 3,898; Referee: Declan Bourne

11 February 2026 32	Grimsby Town	1–0	Accrington Stanley	Cleethorpes
19:45 GMT	McJannet (yellow card) 54'; Sellars-Fleming 58'	Report	Matthews (red card) 86'; Brown (yellow card) 90+2'; Love (yellow card) 90+3'	Stadium: Blundell Park; Attendance: 4,604; Referee: Abigail Byrne
Note: Fixture was initially scheduled for 14 February, but was rearranged due to Grimsby's appearances in the FA Cup.

18 February 2026 33	Grimsby Town	2–2	Walsall	Cleethorpes
19:45 GMT	Cook 50', (yellow card) 66', (goal) 68'	Report	Łopata (yellow card) 7'; Farquharson 32'; Roberts (red card) 45+1'; Pressley 71'; Hornby (yellow card) 86'	Stadium: Blundell Park; Attendance: 5,138; Referee: Ritchie Watkins
Note: Fixture was initially scheduled for 17 February, but was rearranged due to FA Cup involvements on the preceding Sunday.

21 February 2026 34	Bristol Rovers	3–1	Grimsby Town	Bristol
15:00 GMT	Balmer 2'; Quigley 7'; Mola (yellow card) 45+1'; Harrison (yellow card) 51'; Akhamrich 63'; Smallwood (yellow card) 71'	Report	Cook 38'	Stadium: Memorial Stadium; Referee: Oliver Yates

28 February 2026 35	Notts County	0–1	Grimsby Town	Nottingham
15:00 GMT	Iorpenda (yellow card) 36'; Ndlovu (red card) 76'; Dennis (yellow card) 90+1'; Robertson (yellow card) 90+2'	Report	Soonsup-Bell (yellow card) 15'; Turi (yellow card) 45'; Rodgers (yellow card) 50'; Vernam 85'	Stadium: Meadow Lane; Attendance: 12,387; Referee: Declan Brown

3 March 2026 26	Grimsby Town	3–1	Salford City	Cleethorpes
19:45 GMT	Green 33'; Vernam 39'; Soonsup-Bell 42'; Walker (yellow card) 90+5'; Kacurri (yellow card) 90+6'	Report	Ashley (yellow card) 50'; Stockton 53', (yellow card) 61'; Austerfield (yellow card) 59'; Grant (yellow card) 90'	Stadium: Blundell Park; Attendance: 5,154; Referee: Ross Joyce
Note: Fixture was initially scheduled for 10 January, but was postponed due to both teams' appearances in the FA Cup and then postponed again to due Salford's rearranged FA Cup fixture.

7 March 2026 36	Grimsby Town	1–1	Bromley	Cleethorpes
12:30 GMT	Vernam 31' (pen.)	Report	Krauhaus (yellow card) 10'; Kabamba 28'; Arthurs (yellow card) 35'	Stadium: Blundell Park; Attendance: 6,777; Referee: Seb Stockbridge
Note: Fixture was initially scheduled for 15:00, but was moved for live Sky Sports broadcast.

14 March 2026 37	Oldham Athletic	1–0	Grimsby Town	Oldham
15:00 GMT	Hawkes 83', (yellow card) 83'; Woods (yellow card) 90+1'	Report	McEachran (yellow card) 70'; Amaluzor (yellow card) 90+5'	Stadium: Boundary Park; Attendance: 8,896; Referee: Elliott Swallow

17 March 2026 38	Grimsby Town	1–0	Fleetwood Town	Cleethorpes
19:45 GMT	Kacurri (yellow card) 59'; Kabia 90+6'	Report	Neal (yellow card) 55'; Powell (yellow card) 72'; Clark (yellow card) 77'; Rooney (yellow card) 90+4'; Bonds (yellow card) 90+8'	Stadium: Blundell Park; Attendance: 5,463; Referee: Wayne Cartmel

21 March 2026 39	Grimsby Town	5–0	Barrow	Cleethorpes
15:00 GMT	Cook 17'; Green 42', 87'; Kabia 61', 90+10'	Report		Stadium: Blundell Park; Attendance: 7,132; Referee: Ben Speedie

3 April 2026 41	Grimsby Town	1–3	Harrogate Town	Cleethorpes
15:00 BST	Burns (yellow card) 30'; Green 39'; Cook (penalty missed) 45+2'	Report	Brenan 21'; Evans 27'; Headman (yellow card) 60'; Morris 80', (yellow card) 90+1'; Gray (yellow card) 90+5'	Stadium: Blundell Park; Attendance: 7,911; Referee: Andrew Humphries

6 April 2026 42	Crawley Town	0–2	Grimsby Town	Crawley
15:00 BST	Williams (red card) 50'; Forster (yellow card) 66'	Report	Kabia 23'; Rodgers 36'; Staunton (yellow card) 82'	Stadium: Broadfield Stadium; Attendance: 4,273; Referee: Bobby Madley

11 April 2026 43	Grimsby Town	3–2	Crewe Alexandra	Cleethorpes
15:00 BST	Cook 10', 58'; Green 49'; Kacurri (yellow card) 62'	Report	O'Reilly 88' (pen.); Demetriou 90+7'	Stadium: Blundell Park; Attendance: 6,931; Referee: David Rock

14 April 2026 40	Chesterfield	2–1	Grimsby Town	Chesterfield
15:00 GMT	Mandeville 31'; Bonis 34'; Dobra (yellow card) 59'; Naylor (yellow card) 90+1'; Stirk (yellow card) 90+4'	Report	Kabia 41'; Cook (yellow card) 51'; Turi (yellow card) 63'; Staunton (yellow card) 82', (penalty missed) 90+5'	Stadium: SMH Group Stadium; Attendance: 8,661; Referee: Tom Reeves
Note: Fixture was postponed due to international call-ups.

18 April 2026 44	Gillingham	1–4	Grimsby Town	Gillingham
15:00 BST	Little (yellow card) 45+3'; McCleary 55'; Hale (yellow card) 90+3'	Report	Cook 41'; Amaluzor (yellow card) 45'; Kabia 74'; Green 80'; Vernam 85'	Stadium: Priestfield Stadium; Attendance: 5,863; Referee: Oliver Mackey

21 April 2026 25	Cambridge United	1–2	Grimsby Town	Cambridge
19:45 GMT	Knight 41', (penalty missed) 59'	Report	Green 23'; Turi (yellow card) 42'; Kacurri (yellow card) 58'; McJannet 90+4'	Stadium: Abbey Stadium; Attendance: 7,779; Referee: Thomas Parsons
Note: Fixture was originally scheduled for 4 January, but was postponed due to a frozen pitch. Then again on 24 March due to international call-ups.

25 April 2025 45	Grimsby Town	4–0	Swindon Town	Cleethorpes
12:30 BST	Kabia 8' (pen.), 43', 58'; Kacurri 22'	Report	Mabete (yellow card) 88'; McGregor (yellow card) 90+6'	Stadium: Blundell Park; Attendance: 8,167; Referee: Carl Brook
Note: Fixture was initially scheduled for 15:00, but was brought forward for live Sky Sports broadcast.

2 May 2026 46	Tranmere Rovers	1–1	Grimsby Town	Birkenhead
15:00 BST	Smith 64'	Report	Amaluzor 43'; Walker (yellow card) 90+2'	Stadium: Prenton Park; Attendance: 11,141; Referee: Martin Coy

==== Play-offs ====
Grimsby Town finished 7th in the regular season and were drawn against 4th place Salford City, first leg at home and then away in the second leg.

10 May 2026 1st Leg	Grimsby Town	1–2	Salford City	Cleethorpes
15:00 BST	Staunton 1'; Turi (yellow card) 58'	Report	Cesay 4'; Garbutt (yellow card) 19'; Oluwo 40'; Austerfield (yellow card) 58'; Butcher (yellow card) 63'	Stadium: Blundell Park; Referee: Matthew Corlett

15 May 2026 2nd Leg	Salford City	2–2 (a.e.t.) (4–3 agg.)	Grimsby Town	Kersal
19:15 BST	Udoh 53'; Cesay 117'	Report	Vernam (yellow card) 70'; Green 74', (yellow card) 92'; Kabia 78'	Stadium: Moor Lane; Referee: Ben Speedie

=== FA Cup ===
As a League Two side, Grimsby entered the FA Cup in the first round, and were drawn at home to National League South side Ebbsfleet United. In the second round, Grimsby were drawn at home to National League club Wealdstone. They were then drawn at home to National League South club Weston-super-Mare in the third round, and at home to Premier League side Wolverhampton Wanderers in the fourth round.

Win Draw Loss Fixtures

1 November 2025 First round	Grimsby Town	3–1	Ebbsfleet United	Cleethorpes
15:00 GMT	Rose 53', 67'; McJannet 55'; Warren (yellow card) 90+2'	Report	Seaman 34'; Cosgrave (yellow card) 41'; Coker (yellow card) 45'; Chapman (red card) 45+1'; Kennedy (yellow card) 54'; Barnes (yellow card) 90'	Stadium: Blundell Park; Attendance: 3,392; Referee: Jamie O'Connor

6 December 2025 Second round	Grimsby Town	4–0	Wealdstone	Cleethorpes
15:00 GMT	Kabia 7', 53', (yellow card) 64'; Green 15'; Walker 23'	Report		Stadium: Blundell Park; Attendance: 3,655; Referee: Matthew Russell

10 January 2026 Third round	Grimsby Town	3–2	Weston-super-Mare	Cleethorpes
17:45 GMT	Vernam 41'; Kabia 70'; Khouri (yellow card) 76'; Green 86'	Report	Cummins (yellow card) 8'; Coulson 49'; Britton 77'	Stadium: Blundell Park; Attendance: 4,851; Referee: Martin Coy

15 February 2026 Fourth round	Grimsby Town	0–1	Wolverhampton Wanderers	Cleethorpes
13:30 GMT	McJannet (yellow card) 34'; Kabia (yellow card) 46'	Report	Mosquera (yellow card) 29'; André (yellow card) 36'; Bueno 60'	Stadium: Blundell Park; Attendance: 8,594; Referee: Sam Barrott

=== EFL Cup ===
As a League Two side, Grimsby entered the EFL Cup in the first round, and were drawn at home to League Two side Shrewsbury Town. In the second round, they were drawn at home to Premier League club Manchester United, which was the first time the two teams have faced each other since 1948. Grimsby won the match in a shock victory of 12–11 on penalties after a 2–2 draw. In the third round, Grimsby were drawn away to Championship club Sheffield Wednesday, where they won 1–0 and reached the fourth round for the first time since 2001. In the fourth round, they were drawn at home to Premier League side Brentford.

Win Draw Loss Fixtures

12 August 2025 First round	Grimsby Town	3–1	Shrewsbury Town	Cleethorpes
19:45 BST	Amaluzor 15'; Walker (penalty missed) 27'; Gardner 50'; Kabia 90+2' (pen.)	Report	Benning (yellow card) 4'; Anderson (yellow card) 26'; Clucas (yellow card) 47'; Sang 63'; Hoole (yellow card) 81'	Stadium: Blundell Park; Attendance: 3,156; Referee: Seb Stockbridge

27 August 2025 Second round	Grimsby Town	2–2 (12–11 p)	Manchester United	Cleethorpes
20:00 BST	Vernam 22'; Warren 30'; Khouri (yellow card) 87'; McJannet (yellow card) 88'	Report	Fredricson (yellow card) 36'; Mbeumo 75'; Zirkzee (yellow card) 87'; Maguire 89'	Stadium: Blundell Park; Attendance: 8,747; Referee: Tony Harrington
	Penalties
	Kabia (penalty scored); Burns (penalty scored); Oduor (penalty missed); Staunton (penalty scored); Brown (penalty scored); McJannet (penalty scored); Turi (penalty scored); Sweeney (penalty scored); Khouri (penalty scored); Warren (penalty scored); Pym (penalty scored); Kabia (penalty scored); Burns (penalty scored)		(penalty scored) Fernandes; (penalty scored) Mbeumo; (penalty scored) Mount; (penalty scored) Dalot; (penalty missed) Cunha; (penalty scored) Zirkzee; (penalty scored) Mainoo; (penalty scored) Maguire; (penalty scored) De Ligt; (penalty scored) Šeško; (penalty scored) Onana; (penalty scored) Fernandes; (penalty missed) Mbeumo

16 September 2025 Third round	Sheffield Wednesday	0–1	Grimsby Town	Sheffield
19:45 BST	McGhee (yellow card) 18'; Otegbayo (yellow card) 81'	Report	Staunton (yellow card) 42'; Kabia 49'	Stadium: Hillsborough Stadium; Attendance: 9,424; Referee: Elliot Bell

28 October 2025 Fourth round	Grimsby Town	0–5	Brentford	Cleethorpes
19:45 GMT	Khouri (yellow card) 53'; McJannet (yellow card) 77'	Report	Jensen 22'; Lewis-Potter 26'; Nelson 43'; Carvalho 54' (pen.); Collins 75'	Stadium: Blundell Park; Attendance: 8,637; Referee: Thomas Kirk

=== EFL Trophy ===
Grimsby were drawn against Bradford City, Doncaster Rovers and Everton U21 in the group stage.

Pos	Div	Team	Pld	W	PW	PL	L	GF	GA	GD	Pts	Qualification
1	L1	Doncaster Rovers	3	3	0	0	0	8	2	+6	9	Advance to Round 2
2	L1	Bradford City	3	2	0	0	1	8	5	+3	6	Advance to Round 2
3	L2	Grimsby Town	3	1	0	0	2	6	8	−2	3	
4	ACA	Everton U21	3	0	0	0	3	5	12	−7	0	

Source: EFL

Win Draw Loss Fixtures

==== Matches ====
On 14 July 2025, the fixture dates and kick-off times were confirmed for the Group Stage of the competition.

2 September 2025 Group Stage	Bradford City	2–1	Grimsby Town	Bradford
19:30 BST	Metcalfe (yellow card) 31'; Lapslie (yellow card) 61'; Cook 76', 90+5'	Report	Onoh (yellow card) 3'; Brown (red card) 26'; Rose 45+3' (pen.)	Stadium: Valley Parade; Attendance: 4,771; Referee: Paul Marsden

7 October 2025 Group Stage	Grimsby Town	0–3	Doncaster Rovers	Cleethorpes
19:00 BST		Report	Gotts 7', 14'; McJannet 90' (o.g.); Flint (yellow card) 90+3'	Stadium: Blundell Park; Attendance: 1,511; Referee: Scott Oldham

4 November 2025 Group Stage	Grimsby Town	5–3	Everton U21	Cleethorpes
19:30 GMT	Walker 40', 58'; Oduor 45+2'; Gilsenan 52'; Eccleston (yellow card) 62'; Staunton 87'; Burns (yellow card) 90+3'	Report	Beaumont-Clark 21'; Tamen 63'; Morgan 90+2'	Stadium: Blundell Park; Attendance: 404; Referee: Michael Barlow

== Statistics ==
=== Appearances and goals ===
Players with no appearances are not included on the list

No.	Pos	Nat	Player	Total		League Two		FA Cup		EFL Cup		EFL Trophy		League Two play-offs	
No.	Pos	Nat	Player	Apps	Goals	Apps	Goals	Apps	Goals	Apps	Goals	Apps	Goals	Apps	Goals
1	GK	(Northern Ireland) NIR	Christy Pym	25	0	19+0	0	2+0	0	4+0	0	0+0	0	0+0	0
2	DF	(Albania) ALB	Maldini Kacurri	18	1	16+0	1	0+0	0	0+0	0	0+0	0	2+0	0
3	DF	(England) ENG	Jayden Sweeney	32	3	21+6	3	2+0	0	2+0	0	0+1	0	0+0	0
4	DF	(England) ENG	Kieran Green	51	16	40+2	13	1+2	2	3+1	0	0+0	0	2+0	1
5	DF	(England) ENG	Harvey Rodgers	56	3	45+0	3	3+1	0	3+1	0	0+1	0	2+0	0
6	DF	(England) ENG	Samuel Lavelle	12	0	6+0	0	2+0	0	2+0	0	1+1	0	0+0	0
7	MF	(Scotland) SCO	Jamie Walker	51	7	20+20	4	4+0	1	1+2	0	2+0	2	1+1	0
8	MF	(England) ENG	Evan Khouri	42	4	22+10	4	3+1	0	4+0	0	1+1	0	0+0	0
9	FW	(Republic of Ireland) IRL	Jaze Kabia	57	24	32+14	18	2+2	3	2+2	2	0+1	0	1+1	1
10	FW	(Thailand) THA	Jude Soonsup-Bell	29	1	8+16	1	1+1	0	0+0	0	3+0	0	0+0	0
11	MF	(Iceland) ISL	Jason Daði Svanþórsson	9	0	1+6	0	1+0	0	0+1	0	0+0	0	0+0	0
14	MF	(England) ENG	Justin Amaluzor	44	4	11+24	3	0+2	0	2+0	1	3+0	0	1+1	0
15	MF	(Faroe Islands) FRO	Géza Dávid Turi	40	0	26+4	0	2+2	0	1+2	0	1+0	0	2+0	0
16	DF	(Republic of Ireland) IRL	Reece Staunton	49	2	23+15	0	2+1	0	2+1	0	3+0	1	2+0	1
17	DF	(England) ENG	Cameron McJannet	58	3	46+0	2	4+0	1	3+0	0	2+1	0	2+0	0
18	MF	(Republic of Ireland) IRL	Darragh Burns	52	1	30+10	1	3+0	0	3+1	0	0+3	0	1+1	0
19	MF	(Republic of Ireland) IRL	Zak Gilsenan	5	1	0+2	0	0+1	0	0+0	0	1+1	1	0+0	0
20	MF	(England) ENG	George McEachran	43	0	24+11	0	2+0	0	3+0	0	1+1	0	0+1	0
21	DF	(England) ENG	Tyrell Warren	36	1	15+10	0	2+2	0	3+1	1	1+1	0	0+1	0
22	FW	(Scotland) SCO	Cameron Gardner	8	1	0+6	0	0+0	0	2+0	1	0+0	0	0+0	0
23	MF	(England) ENG	Henry Brown	5	0	0+2	0	0+0	0	0+2	0	1+0	0	0+0	0
24	DF	(England) ENG	Doug Tharme	14	0	11+0	0	1+0	0	1+0	0	0+0	0	0+1	0
26	DF	(England) ENG	Alex Graham	2	0	0+0	0	0+0	0	0+0	0	2+0	0	0+0	0
27	MF	(England) ENG	Fortune Onoh	3	0	0+0	0	0+0	0	0+0	0	2+1	0	0+0	0
29	MF	(Kenya) KEN	Clarke Oduor	28	1	7+14	0	0+1	0	0+2	0	2+0	1	1+1	0
30	MF	(England) ENG	Charles Vernam	50	12	33+8	10	4+0	1	3+0	1	0+0	0	1+1	0
31	GK	(England) ENG	Jackson Smith	30	0	26+0	0	2+0	0	0+0	0	0+0	0	2+0	0
35	FW	(England) ENG	Elliot Smith	1	0	0+0	0	0+1	0	0+0	0	0+0	0	0+0	0
39	FW	(England) ENG	Andy Cook	25	8	16+6	8	0+1	0	0+0	0	0+0	0	2+0	0
40	FW	(England) ENG	Tyrell Sellars-Fleming	10	1	3+5	1	0+2	0	0+0	0	0+0	0	0+0	0
41	GK	(England) ENG	Seb Auton	1	0	0+0	0	0+0	0	0+0	0	1+0	0	0+0	0
Player(s) who featured for the club but left the club permanently during the season:
32	FW	(England) ENG	Danny Rose	18	5	4+9	2	1+0	2	0+1	0	2+1	1	0+0	0
Player(s) who featured whilst on loan but returned to parent club during the season:
12	DF	(England) ENG	Neo Eccleston	5	0	0+2	0	0+0	0	0+1	0	2+0	0	0+0	0
33	GK	(England) ENG	Charlie Casper	3	0	0+1	0	0+0	0	0+0	0	2+0	0	0+0	0
38	GK	(England) ENG	Richard O'Donnell	1	0	1+0	0	0+0	0	0+0	0	0+0	0	0+0	0

=== Disciplinary record ===
Includes all competitive matches. The list is sorted by squad number when disciplinary points / points per card / number of cards are equal. Players with no cards not included in the list.

Rank	No.	Pos.	Nat.	Name	League Two			FA Cup			EFL Cup			EFL Trophy			League Two play-offs			Total		
Rank	No.	Pos.	Nat.	Name	Yellow card	Second yellow card	Red card	Yellow card	Second yellow card	Red card	Yellow card	Second yellow card	Red card	Yellow card	Second yellow card	Red card	Yellow card	Second yellow card	Red card	Yellow card	Second yellow card	Red card
1	17	DF	(England)	Cameron McJannet	5	0	0	1	0	0	2	0	0	0	0	0	0	0	0	8	0	0
2	5	DF	(England)	Harvey Rodgers	7	0	0	0	0	0	0	0	0	0	0	0	0	0	0	7	0	0
2	8	MF	(England)	Evan Khouri	4	0	0	1	0	0	2	0	0	0	0	0	0	0	0	7	0	0
2	9	ST	(Republic of Ireland)	Jaze Kabia	5	0	0	2	0	0	0	0	0	0	0	0	0	0	0	7	0	0
2	20	MF	(England)	George McEachran	7	0	0	0	0	0	0	0	0	0	0	0	0	0	0	7	0	0
6	4	MF	(England)	Kieran Green	3	1	0	0	0	0	0	0	0	0	0	0	1	0	0	4	1	0
6	15	MF	(Faroe Islands)	Géza Dávid Turi	5	0	0	0	0	0	0	0	0	0	0	0	1	0	0	6	0	0
8	18	MF	(Republic of Ireland)	Darragh Burns	4	0	0	0	0	0	0	0	0	1	0	0	0	0	0	5	0	0
9	2	DF	(Albania)	Maldini Kacurri	4	0	0	0	0	0	0	0	0	0	0	0	0	0	0	4	0	0
9	14	MF	(England)	Justin Amaluzor	4	0	0	0	0	0	0	0	0	0	0	0	0	0	0	4	0	0
9	39	ST	(England)	Andy Cook	4	0	0	0	0	0	0	0	0	0	0	0	0	0	0	4	0	0
12	1	GK	(Northern Ireland)	Christy Pym	0	0	1	0	0	0	0	0	0	0	0	0	0	0	0	0	0	1
12	3	DF	(England)	Jayden Sweeney	3	0	0	0	0	0	0	0	0	0	0	0	0	0	0	3	0	0
12	7	MF	(Scotland)	Jamie Walker	3	0	0	0	0	0	0	0	0	0	0	0	0	0	0	3	0	0
12	21	DF	(England)	Tyrell Warren	2	0	0	1	0	0	0	0	0	0	0	0	0	0	0	3	0	0
12	23	MF	(England)	Henry Brown	0	0	0	0	0	0	0	0	0	0	0	1	0	0	0	0	0	1
17	16	DF	(Republic of Ireland)	Reece Staunton	1	0	0	0	0	0	1	0	0	0	0	0	0	0	0	2	0	0
17	30	MF	(England)	Charles Vernam	1	0	0	0	0	0	0	0	0	0	0	0	1	0	0	2	0	0
19	10	FW	(Thailand)	Jude Soonsup-Bell	1	0	0	0	0	0	0	0	0	0	0	0	0	0	0	1	0	0
19	12	DF	(England)	Neo Eccleston	0	0	0	0	0	0	0	0	0	1	0	0	0	0	0	1	0	0
19	22	ST	(Scotland)	Cameron Gardner	1	0	0	0	0	0	0	0	0	0	0	0	0	0	0	1	0	0
19	24	DF	(England)	Doug Tharme	1	0	0	0	0	0	0	0	0	0	0	0	0	0	0	1	0	0
19	27	MF	(England)	Fortune Onoh	0	0	0	0	0	0	0	0	0	1	0	0	0	0	0	1	0	0
19	32	ST	(England)	Danny Rose	1	0	0	0	0	0	0	0	0	0	0	0	0	0	0	1	0	0
Total					67	1	1	5	0	0	5	0	0	3	0	1	3	0	0	83	1	2
