= Seb Auton =

English footballer (born 2006)

Personal information
- Full name: Sebastian James Auton
- Date of birth: 7 November 2006 (age 20)
- Place of birth: Kingston upon Hull, England
- Height: 6 ft 1 in (1.85 m)
- Position: Goalkeeper

Team information
- Current team: Grimsby Town
- Number: 41

Youth career
- –2024: Grimsby Town

Senior career*
Years	Team	Apps	(Gls)
2024–	Grimsby Town	2	(0)
2025–2026	→ Grimsby Borough (loan)	18	(0)
- * Club domestic league appearances and goals as of 11:22, 10 November 2025 (UTC)

Sebastian James Auton (born 17 November 2006) is an English footballer who plays as a goalkeeper for EFL League Two club Grimsby Town.

== Career ==
=== Grimsby Town ===
Auton joined the Grimsby Town academy at the age of thirteen and progressed through the club's youth teams. He made his senior debut on 28 September 2024, replacing the injured Jake Eastwood during the first half of a 3–2 League Two victory away to Carlisle United. Auton conceded once after entering the match, with Grimsby subsequently recovering from 2–1 down to win through a stoppage-time Harvey Rodgers goal.

On 30 May 2025, Auton signed his first professional contract, agreeing a one-year deal with Grimsby. He made his first competitive senior start on 2 September, playing the full match in a 2–1 EFL Trophy defeat away to Bradford City. Grimsby played for more than an hour with ten men following Henry Brown's dismissal, with Auton making a series of saves before Bradford scored twice during the closing stages.

On 12 September 2025, Auton joined Grimsby Borough of the Northern Premier League Division One East on an initial one-month loan. His loan was extended on 14 October until January 2026. He returned to Grimsby Town on 3 January 2026 and rejoined the first-team squad.

At the conclusion of the 2025–26 season, Grimsby exercised an option extending Auton's contract until the summer of 2027.

On 1 September 2026, Auton made his second League Two appearance when he replaced the injured Christy Pym at half-time during a 2–2 draw away to Accrington Stanley. He conceded Accrington's equaliser but later made an important save from Shaun Whalley's header.

Auton made another substitute appearance on 22 September, replacing Harvey Cartwright at half-time during a 2–1 EFL Trophy defeat against Notts County. He saved a stoppage-time free kick from Matt Palmer, but Ollie Cooper converted the rebound to score the winning goal with the final kick of the match.

== Career statistics ==
As of match played 10 November 2026

Appearances and goals by club, season and competition
Club	Season	League			FA Cup		League Cup		Other		Total	
Club	Season	Division	Apps	Goals	Apps	Goals	Apps	Goals	Apps	Goals	Apps	Goals
Grimsby Town	2024–25	League Two	1	0	0	0	0	0	0	0	1	0
Grimsby Town	2025–26	League Two	0	0	0	0	0	0	1 (Note: Appearance(s) in EFL Trophy)	0	1	0
Grimsby Town	2026–27	League Two	1	0	0	0	0	0	1	0	2	0
Grimsby Town	Total		2	0	0	0	0	0	2	0	4	0
Grimsby Borough	2025–26	NPL East	2	0	2	0	0	0	0	0	4	0
Career total			4	0	2	0	0	0	2	0	8	0
