= Reece Staunton =

Footballer (born 2001)

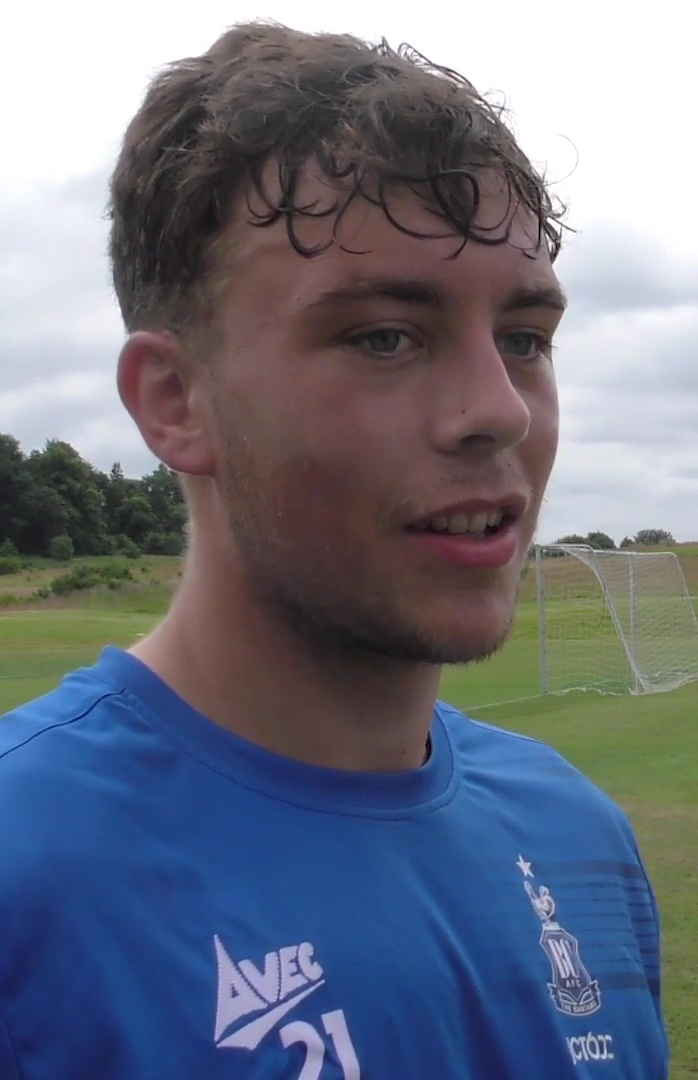
- Staunton with Bradford City in 2021

Personal information
- Full name: Reece Joseph Staunton
- Date of birth: 10 December 2001 (age 24)
- Place of birth: Bradford, England
- Height: 1.83 m (6 ft 0 in)
- Positions: Defender; defensive midfielder

Team information
- Current team: Grimsby Town
- Number: 16

Youth career
- –2017: Bradford City

Senior career*
Years	Team	Apps	(Gls)
2017–2022	Bradford City	10	(1)
2019	→ Ossett United (loan)	3	(0)
2019–2020	→ Bradford (Park Avenue) (loan)	6	(0)
2021	→ Bradford (Park Avenue) (loan)	4	(0)
2022–2023	Bradford (Park Avenue)	35	(0)
2023–2025	Spennymoor Town	84	(2)
2025–	Grimsby Town	39	(0)

International career
- Republic of Ireland U18
- * Club domestic league appearances and goals as of 12:08, 27 September 2026 (UTC)

Reece Joseph Staunton (born 10 December 2001) is a professional footballer who plays as a defender or defensive midfielder for EFL League Two side Grimsby Town.

Born in England, he represents Ireland at youth international level.

== Early and personal life ==
Staunton attended Bradford Academy.

== Club career ==
=== Bradford City ===
He made his senior debut for Bradford City on 7 November 2017, at the age of 15 years 332 days, becoming the club's youngest ever player. He signed a two-year academy scholarship with the club in September 2017, having first joined at under-12 level.

He made his first appearance of the 2018–19 season in a 4–1 home defeat in the EFL Trophy on 9 October 2018. He was praised by manager David Hopkin for his performance in the match.

In August 2019 he moved on loan to Ossett United. He returned to Bradford City on 23 September 2019. He made his first City appearance of the 2019–20 season a few days later, in the EFL Trophy.

In November 2019 he moved on loan to Bradford (Park Avenue). The loan was extended in December 2019 for a further month, with Park Avenue manager Mark Bower praising Staunton. Later that month he turned professional with Bradford City, signing a contract until the end of the 2021–22 season. On 8 January 2020 the loan deal was ended early.

At the end of the 2019–20 season he was praised by new City manager Stuart McCall, who said Staunton was one of potentially four youngsters who would join the first-team for the 2020–21 season. Staunton was praised by club captain Richard O'Donnell after an impressive performance on the opening day of the 2020–21 season. In September 2020 he signed a new four-year contract with the club. Later that month he suffered an ankle injury, missing matches before being back in first-team contention towards the end of October.

In November 2020 he was one of a number of young Bradford City players playing in the first team who were praised by manager Stuart McCall. Later that month Staunton spoke about how his first-team run was improving his skills. On 30 November he was ruled out for 3 months due following a hamstring injury sustained in a match the week before. By March 2021 he was still continuing his recovery from the injury.

In July 2021, ahead of the start of the 2021–22 season, Staunton's teammate Niall Canavan told him to remain positive as he continued his rehabilitation from injury.

He was made available for loan to National League clubs in September 2021. He moved on loan to Bradford (Park Avenue) in November 2021. After returning from his loan in late 2021, he was made available for loan again in January 2022. The next month, following the departure of club captain and fellow defender Canavan, Staunton was challenged by manager Derek Adams to "push forward" and challenge for a first-team spot.

=== Bradford (Park Avenue) ===
In August 2022 he moved to Bradford (Park Avenue) for an undisclosed transfer fee, his third spell with the club.

=== Spennymoor Town ===
On 8 June 2023, Staunton signed for National League North side Spennymoor Town. At the end of the 2023–24 season, he won the Supporters' Player and Players' Player of the Year awards. The following season, he won the Players' Player of the Year award again; sharing the award with Glen Taylor.

=== Grimsby Town ===
On 19 June 2025, it was announced that Staunton had signed for League Two side Grimsby Town on a two-year deal. The transfer saw Staunton return to the English Football League following an "impressive" season with Spennymoor.

Staunton made his competitive debut for Grimsby on 12 August 2025, starting at left-back in a 3–1 victory over Shrewsbury Town in the first round of the EFL Cup. He scored his first competitive goal for the club on 4 November, completing a 5–3 victory against Everton Under-21s in the EFL Trophy with a deflected strike from the edge of the penalty area.

On 10 May 2026, Staunton scored his first League Two goal after 26 seconds of the first leg of Grimsby's play-off semi-final against Salford City, striking a long-range volley to give Grimsby an early lead. Salford subsequently won the match 2–1. Grimsby were eliminated after losing the tie 4–3 on aggregate following extra time in the second leg.

Staunton suffered a shoulder injury during a pre-season friendly against Ukrainian side Zorya Luhansk on 18 July 2026. While recovering, he signed a new three-year contract on 5 August, extending his stay at Grimsby until the summer of 2029. He returned to competitive action on 22 September, starting as a wing-back against Notts County in the EFL Trophy after missing the opening weeks of the season.

== International career ==
In November 2018 he was called up by the Republic of Ireland under-18 team, having first been involved with the national team set-up since the previous year.

== Style of play ==
Speaking in May 2020, Bradford City manager Stuart McCall described Staunton by saying "he's adaptable because he can play left back, left centre half in a three and can sit in front of the back four. He's got a really good passing range".

== Career statistics ==
As of match played 26 September 2026

Appearances and goals by club, season and competition
Club	Season	League			FA Cup		EFL Cup		Other		Total	
Club	Season	Division	Apps	Goals	Apps	Goals	Apps	Goals	Apps	Goals	Apps	Goals
Bradford City	2017–18	League One	1	0	0	0	0	0	1 (Note: Appearance(s) in the EFL Trophy.)	0	2	0
Bradford City	2018–19	League One	0	0	0	0	0	0	1	0	1	0
Bradford City	2019–20	League Two	0	0	0	0	0	0	1	0	1	0
Bradford City	2020–21	League Two	8	1	1	0	2	0	3	0	14	1
Bradford City	2021–22	League Two	1	0	0	0	0	0	2	0	3	0
Bradford City	Total		10	1	1	0	2	0	8	0	21	1
Ossett United (loan)	2019–20	Northern Premier League Division One North West	3	0	0	0	0	0	0	0	3	0
Bradford (Park Avenue) (loan)	2019–20	National League North	6	0	0	0	0	0	0	0	6	0
Bradford (Park Avenue) (loan)	2021–22	National League North	4	0	0	0	0	0	1 (Note: Appearance(s) in the FA Trophy.)	0	5	0
Bradford (Park Avenue)	2022–23	National League North	35	0	0	0	0	0	1	0	36	0
Spennymoor Town	2023–24	National League North	42	2	0	0	0	0	1	0	43	2
Spennymoor Town	2024–25	National League North	42	0	1	0	0	0	2	0	45	0
Spennymoor Town	Total		84	2	1	0	0	0	3	0	88	2
Grimsby Town	2025–26	League Two	38	0	3	0	3	0	5 (Note: Three appearances and one goal in the EFL Trophy, two appearances and one goal in the play-offs)	2	49	2
Grimsby Town	2026–27	League Two	1	0	0	0	0	0	1	0	2	0
Grimsby Town	Total		39	0	3	0	3	0	6	2	51	2
Career total			181	3	5	0	5	0	19	2	210	5

== Honours ==
Spennymoor Town

- FA Trophy runner-up: 2024–25

Individual

- Spennymoor Town Supporters' Player of the Year: 2023–24
- Spennymoor Town Players' Player of the Year: 2023–24; 2024–25
