= Kieran Green =

English footballer (born 1997)

Personal information
- Full name: Kieran Thomas Green
- Date of birth: 30 June 1997 (age 29)
- Place of birth: Stockton-on-Tees, England
- Height: 5 ft 9 in (1.75 m)
- Position: Central midfielder

Team information
- Current team: Grimsby Town
- Number: 4

Youth career
- Stockton Town
- –2014: Hartlepool United

Senior career*
| Years | Team | Apps | (Gls) |
| 2014–2017 | Hartlepool United | 2 | (0) |
| 2014 | → Spennymoor Town (loan) | | |
| 2015 | → Frickley Athletic (loan) | | |
| 2017 | → Gateshead (loan) | 1 | (0) |
| 2017–2018 | Gateshead | 8 | (0) |
| 2017–2018 | → Blyth Spartans (loan) | 5 | (1) |
| 2018 | → Blyth Spartans (loan) | 4 | (0) |
| 2018–2019 | Blyth Spartans | 39 | (7) |
| 2019–2020 | York City | 34 | (4) |
| 2020–2022 | FC Halifax Town | 75 | (6) |
| 2022– | Grimsby Town | 157 | (26) |
- * Club domestic league appearances and goals as of 11:51, 6 November 2026 (UTC)

Kieran Thomas Green (born 30 June 1997) is an English professional footballer who plays as a central midfielder for EFL League Two club Grimsby Town.

He began his career as a professional for Hartlepool United, but would go on to appear at Non-league level for Spennymoor Town, Frickley Athletic, Gateshead, Blyth Spartans and York City. He joined FC Halifax Town in 2020, where he would spend two seasons. He then moved to League Two club Grimsby Town.

== Club career ==
=== Early career ===
Green was born in Stockton-on-Tees, County Cleveland. He joined Hartlepool United's youth academy at under-14 level from Stockton Town. Green made his first-team debut on 7 October 2014 at the age of 17, starting in a 2–1 Football League Trophy home loss against Sheffield United. He joined Northern Premier League Division One North club Spennymoor Town on 21 November on work experience.

Green signed a professional contract with Hartlepool in April 2015. He joined Northern Premier League Premier Division club Frickley Athletic on 15 October on a one-month loan.

=== Non-League ===
Green joined National League club Gateshead on 22 March 2017 loan until the end of the 2016–17 season. He for Gateshead permanently on 17 May on a one-year contract, having been released by Hartlepool at the end of the season.

Green joined National League North club Blyth Spartans on 14 November 2017 on a one-month loan. His loan was extended for a second month on 20 December. He was recalled by Gateshead on 5 January 2018 having impressed while on loan at Blyth. He returned to Blyth on 8 February on loan until 25 March. He signed for Blyth permanently on 15 June 2018.

Green signed for Blyth's National League North rivals York City on 14 May 2019.

On 18 August 2020, Green signed for National League side FC Halifax Town.

=== Grimsby Town ===
On 15 July 2022, Green joined Grimsby Town from Halifax for an undisclosed fee, signing a two-year contract with an option for a third year. He made his competitive debut on 30 July, starting Grimsby's opening league match of the season, a 2–0 defeat away to Leyton Orient. Green scored his first goal for the club on 9 August, striking a volley from outside the penalty area during a 4–0 EFL Cup victory over Crewe Alexandra.

During his first season, Green made 40 appearances in all competitions and appeared five times during Grimsby's run to the quarter-finals of the 2022–23 FA Cup. He was not involved in the 2–1 fifth-round victory away to Premier League club Southampton, but started the quarter-final defeat against Brighton & Hove Albion. In November 2024, Green signed a two-year contract extension which committed him to the club until June 2027.

On 12 April 2025, Green scored from inside his own half in a 2–2 draw away to Harrogate Town. The approximately 70-yard lob was described by the club as one of the greatest goals in its history.

Green captained Grimsby for much of the 2025–26 season, initially deputising for Danny Rose before succeeding him as club captain following Rose's departure in January 2026.

Playing in a more advanced midfield role, Green finished the 2025–26 regular league season with 13 goals and seven assists as Grimsby qualified for the League Two play-offs. He scored with a header during the second leg of the play-off semi-final against Salford City, helping Grimsby overturn a two-goal aggregate deficit before they were eliminated 4–3 on aggregate after extra time.

On 28 July 2026, Green signed a new three-year contract, keeping him at Grimsby until June 2029.

== Career statistics ==
As of match played 31 October 2026

Appearances and goals by club, season and competition
| Club | Season | League | | | FA Cup | | League Cup | | Other | | Total | |
| Club | Season | Division | Apps | Goals | Apps | Goals | Apps | Goals | Apps | Goals | Apps | Goals |
|---|---|---|---|---|---|---|---|---|---|---|---|---|
| Hartlepool United | 2014–15 | League Two | 1 | 0 | 0 | 0 | 0 | 0 | 1 (Note: Appearance in Football League Trophy) | 0 | 2 | 0 |
| Hartlepool United | 2015–16 | League Two | 0 | 0 | 0 | 0 | 0 | 0 | 0 | 0 | 0 | 0 |
| Hartlepool United | 2016–17 | League Two | 1 | 0 | 0 | 0 | 0 | 0 | 2 (Note: Appearances in EFL Trophy) | 0 | 3 | 0 |
| Hartlepool United | Total | | 2 | 0 | 0 | 0 | 0 | 0 | 3 | 0 | 5 | 0 |
| Gateshead (loan) | 2016–17 | National League | 1 | 0 | — | | — | | — | | 1 | 0 |
| Gateshead | 2017–18 | National League | 8 | 0 | 0 | 0 | — | | — | | 8 | 0 |
| Gateshead | Total | | 9 | 0 | 0 | 0 | — | | — | | 9 | 0 |
| Blyth Spartans (loan) | 2017–18 | National League North | 9 | 1 | — | | — | | 2 (Note: Appearance(s) in FA Trophy) | 0 | 11 | 1 |
| Blyth Spartans | 2018–19 | National League North | 39 | 7 | 2 | 0 | — | | 4 (Note: Three appearances in FA Trophy, one in National League North play-offs) | 0 | 45 | 7 |
| Blyth Spartans | Total | | 48 | 8 | 2 | 0 | — | | 6 | 0 | 56 | 8 |
| York City | 2019–20 | National League North | 34 | 4 | 1 | 0 | — | | 1 | 0 | 36 | 4 |
| FC Halifax Town | 2020–21 | National League | 41 | 4 | 0 | 0 | — | | 0 | 0 | 41 | 4 |
| FC Halifax Town | 2021–22 | National League | 34 | 2 | 4 | 0 | — | | 3 | 0 | 41 | 2 |
| FC Halifax Town | Total | | 75 | 6 | 4 | 0 | — | | 3 | 0 | 82 | 6 |
| Grimsby Town | 2022–23 | League Two | 31 | 0 | 5 | 0 | 2 | 1 | 2 | 0 | 40 | 1 |
| Grimsby Town | 2023–24 | League Two | 31 | 2 | 2 | 0 | 1 | 0 | 0 | 0 | 34 | 2 |
| Grimsby Town | 2024–25 | League Two | 39 | 7 | 1 | 0 | 2 | 0 | 1 | 0 | 43 | 7 |
| Grimsby Town | 2025–26 | League Two | 42 | 13 | 3 | 2 | 4 | 0 | 2 | 1 | 51 | 16 |
| Grimsby Town | 2026–27 | League Two | 14 | 4 | 0 | 0 | 1 | 0 | 1 | 0 | 8 | 4 |
| Grimsby Town | Total | | 157 | 26 | 11 | 2 | 10 | 1 | 6 | 1 | 183 | 30 |
| Career total | | | 325 | 44 | 18 | 2 | 10 | 1 | 19 | 1 | 372 | 48 |

== Personal life ==
Kieran was born in Stockton-on-Tees in 1997. He has a younger brother, Harry Green (b. 2001), who plays as a left winger for Scarborough Athletic FC.
