= Cameron McJannet =

English footballer (born 1998)

Personal information
- Full name: Cameron Allan McJannet
- Date of birth: 6 September 1998 (age 28)
- Place of birth: Milton Keynes, England
- Height: 1.73 m (5 ft 8 in)
- Position: Defender

Team information
- Current team: Grimsby Town
- Number: 17

Youth career
- 2009–2016: Luton Town
- 2016–2018: Stoke City

Senior career*
Years	Team	Apps	(Gls)
2018–2020	Stoke City	0	(0)
2018–2019	→ Curzon Ashton (loan)	35	(3)
2020–2024	Derry City	127	(9)
2024–	Grimsby Town	100	(5)
- * Club domestic league appearances and goals as of 14:05, 22 November 2026 (UTC)

Cameron Allan McJannet (born 6 September 1998) is an English professional footballer who plays as a defender for EFL League Two club Grimsby Town.

== Career ==
=== Stoke City ===
Born in Milton Keynes, and growing up in Leighton Buzzard, McJannet began his career at Luton Town at under-9 level, being sold to Stoke City in August 2016. At Stoke, he lived in the same apartment block as Harry Souttar. He played on loan at Curzon Ashton.

=== Derry City ===
After being released from Stoke, he signed for the Irish club Derry City in August 2020. He eventually made 142 appearances (including over 50 as captain), and scored twice in the 2022 FAI Cup final. He said that the club not winning the 2023 League of Ireland title was a "missed opportunity". In March 2024, he stated he did not want to leave the club, as he enjoyed the "banter" of being an Englishman in Ireland.

=== Grimsby Town ===
He returned to England in June 2024, signing for Grimsby Town for a "substantial" transfer fee. He made his competitive debut on 10 August, starting in a 1–0 defeat away to Fleetwood Town on the opening day of the League Two season.

McJannet scored his first Grimsby goal on 29 December 2024, opening the scoring in a 3–0 home victory over Port Vale. He made 45 appearances in all competitions and scored twice during his first season with the club.

On 27 August 2025, McJannet played the full match as Grimsby eliminated Manchester United from the EFL Cup. After the match finished 2–2, he converted a penalty during Grimsby's 12–11 shootout victory.

Grimsby exercised an option in McJannet's contract on 2 February 2026, extending his stay until the summer of 2027. He had made 82 appearances for the club by the time the extension was announced.

On 21 April, McJannet scored a 94th-minute winner in a 2–1 victory away to Cambridge United, moving Grimsby into the League Two play-off positions with two matches of the regular season remaining. Grimsby subsequently qualified for the play-offs but were eliminated by Salford City in the semi-finals.

On 9 July 2026, McJannet signed another contract extending his stay at Grimsby until the summer of 2028.

== Career statistics ==
As of match played 21 November 2026

Appearances and goals by club, season and competition
Club	Season	League			National cup (Note: Includes FA Cup & FAI Cup)		League Cup (Note: Includes EFL Cup)		Europe		Other		Total	
Club	Season	Division	Apps	Goals	Apps	Goals	Apps	Goals	Apps	Goals	Apps	Goals	Apps	Goals
Stoke City U21	2017–18	—			—		—		—		2 (Note: Appearance(s) in EFL Trophy)	0	2	0
Curzon Ashton (loan)	2018–19	National League North	35	3	0	0	—		—		0	0	35	3
Stoke City	2019–20	Championship	0	0	0	0	0	0	—		—		0	0
Derry City	2020	LOI Premier Division	9	0	2	0	—		0	0	—		11	0
Derry City	2021	LOI Premier Division	33	5	1	0	—		—		—		34	5
Derry City	2022	LOI Premier Division	34	2	5	2	—		2 (Note: Appearances in the UEFA Europa Conference League)	0	—		41	4
Derry City	2023	LOI Premier Division	30	2	2	0	—		6	0	0	0	38	2
Derry City	2024	LOI Premier Division	21	0	0	0	—		0	0	—		21	0
Derry City	Total		127	9	10	2	0	0	8	0	0	0	145	11
Grimsby Town	2024–25	League Two	41	2	1	0	2	1	—		1	0	45	3
Grimsby Town	2025–26	League Two	46	2	4	1	3	0	—		5 (Note: Three appearances in the EFL Trophy, two appearances in the play-offs)	0	58	3
Grimsby Town	2026–27	League Two	13	1	1	0	1	0	—		0	0	15	1
Grimsby Town	Total		100	5	6	1	6	1	0	0	6	0	118	7
Career total			262	17	16	3	6	1	8	0	8	0	299	21

== Honours ==
=== Player ===
Derry City

- FAI Cup: 2022
- President's Cup: 2023
