= Charles Vernam =

English footballer (born 1996)

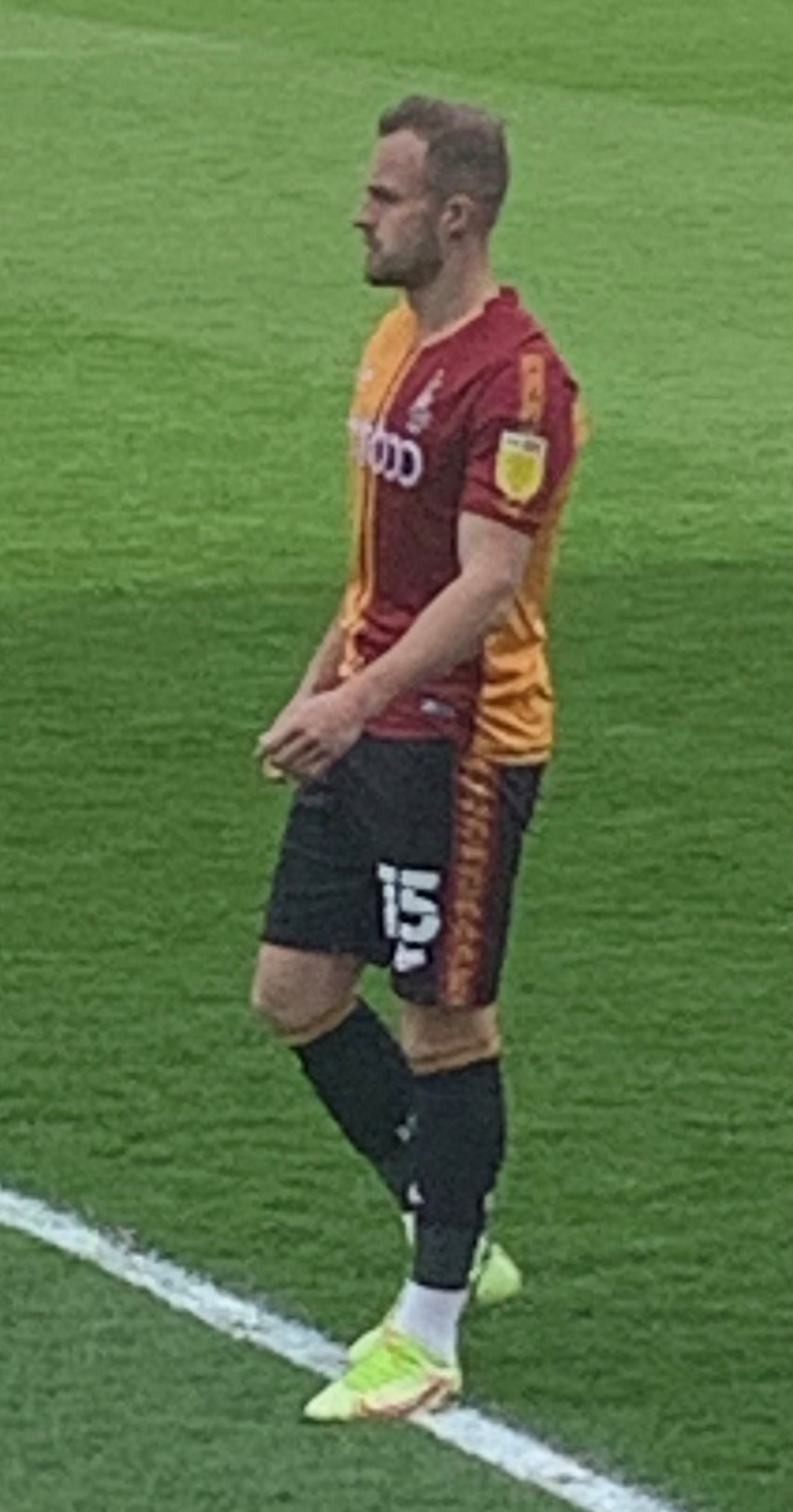
- Vernam at Bradford City in 2022.

Personal information
- Full name: Charles Terence Priestley Vernam
- Date of birth: 8 October 1996 (age 30)
- Place of birth: Lincoln, England
- Height: 5 ft 7 in (1.70 m)
- Position: Winger

Team information
- Current team: Grimsby Town
- Number: 30

Youth career
- –2013: Scunthorpe United
- 2013–2015: Derby County

Senior career*
Years	Team	Apps	(Gls)
2015–2018	Derby County	0	(0)
2016	→ ÍBV (loan)	9	(2)
2017	→ Coventry City (loan)	4	(0)
2018	→ Grimsby Town (loan)	9	(1)
2018–2020	Grimsby Town	62	(10)
2019	→ Chorley (loan)	4	(3)
2020–2021	Burton Albion	14	(2)
2021–2022	Bradford City	49	(10)
2022–2023	Lincoln City	20	(0)
2023–	Grimsby Town	89	(12)
- * Club domestic league appearances and goals as of 11:04, 10 November 2026 (UTC)

Charles Terence Priestley Vernam (born 8 October 1996) is an English professional footballer who plays as a winger for EFL League Two side Grimsby Town.

A product of the Scunthorpe United and Derby County youth academies, he turned professional with the latter and spent time on loan with ÍBV, Coventry City and Grimsby Town. He returned to Grimsby on a permanent basis in 2018 and also saw a brief spell on loan to Chorley whilst with the Mariners. In 2020 he signed for Burton Albion before joining Bradford City only six-month later.

== Early life ==
Vernam was born in Lincoln. He attended Caistor Grammar School.

== Playing career ==
=== Derby County ===
Vernam was attached to Scunthorpe United as a youth player. In 2012 he was given a six-day trial by Italian giants A.C. Milan, however this did not result in a contract offer and Vernam returned to Scunthorpe before joining the Derby County academy later that year. In August 2013, he appeared for the first team against Burton Albion in the pre-season Bass Charity Vase. He signed his first professional contract with Derby in 2015. He was loaned out to ÍBV in Iceland's Úrvalsdeild between April and July 2016, scoring on his senior debut when appearing as a substitute in a 4–0 win against ÍA. He made a total of eleven appearances for ÍBV, without scoring again.

Vernam was promoted to Derby's first team squad for the 2016–17 season while also continuing to play for their under-23 team, for whom he made three appearances in the EFL Trophy. During December 2016, he signed a new contract with the club, running until 2019. He made his competitive first team debut for Derby as a substitute in an FA Cup win against West Bromwich Albion in January 2017. Later that month, he was loaned to Coventry City in League One for the rest of the season. Vernam was cup-tied for Coventry's win in the 2017 EFL Trophy Final.

=== Grimsby Town ===
Vernam went on loan again in January 2018, joining Grimsby Town in League Two for the rest of the season. The move reunited him with manager Russell Slade, who had also signed him for Coventry.

After impressing the new manager Michael Jolley in the closing season, Vernam joined Grimsby Town permanently on a two-year contract on 24 July 2018. He scored the first goal on 37-minutes in the FA Cup second round, a left-footed shot following a corner, in a 2–0 victory at National League club Chesterfield. After struggling to get into the Grimsby starting lineup, he joined National League club Chorley on a one-month loan in November 2019.

Vernam's goal against Colchester United on 11 February 2020 was voted as the EFL League Two goal of the season. He had picked the ball up from the edge of his own area before going on to beat three defenders before hit a strike low beyond the keeper from the edge of the area.

=== Burton Albion ===
On 20 July 2020, Vernam joined League One club Burton Albion on a two-year contract. On 31 January 2021 he was erroneously linked with Bolton Wanderers as mentioned on the Bolton News website.

=== Bradford City ===
On 1 February 2021, Vernam joined Bradford City on an 18-month deal. He was one of seven players offered a new contract by Bradford City at the end of the 2021–22 season.

=== Lincoln City ===
On 17 June 2022, Vernam agreed to join hometown club Lincoln City having rejected the contract offer to stay at Bradford. He would make his debut on 13 August, coming off the bench against Forest Green Rovers. His first Imps goal came in the EFL Trophy against Doncaster Rovers on 20 September 2022.

=== Return to Grimsby Town ===
On 20 June 2023, Vernam returned to Grimsby Town for a third spell, signing a three-year contract after the club agreed an undisclosed fee. He made his first appearance following his return on 5 August, starting Grimsby's opening League Two fixture of the season, a goalless home draw against AFC Wimbledon.

Vernam's first season after returning was disrupted by injury. He was sidelined from September 2023 and remained in rehabilitation in December. He returned to competitive action on 1 January 2024, appearing as a substitute in a 6–1 defeat against Walsall.

Vernam scored his first goal following his return on 17 August 2024, striking from approximately 25 yards in a 3–2 victory over Cheltenham Town. The strike subsequently won the EFL League Two Goal of the Month award for August 2024.

On 27 August 2025, Vernam opened the scoring against Manchester United in the second round of the EFL Cup, controlling Darragh Burns's pass before beating goalkeeper André Onana at his near post. The match finished 2–2 before Grimsby eliminated Manchester United 12–11 in a penalty shoot-out, with Vernam being named man of the match.

On 2 March 2026, Vernam signed a new contract keeping him with Grimsby until the summer of 2027, with the club holding an option for a further year. He finished the 2025–26 league season with ten goals and ten assists from 42 appearances, the first time he had reached double figures for both during a league campaign. He also finished third in the supporters' voting for Grimsby's men's Player of the Year award.

== Playing style ==
Vernam plays as a winger.

== Career statistics ==
As of game played 8 November 2026

Appearances and goals by club, season and competition
Club	Season	League			National Cup (Note: Cup competitions include the FA Cup, Úrvalsdeild karla)		League Cup		Other		Total	
Club	Season	Division	Apps	Goals	Apps	Goals	Apps	Goals	Apps	Goals	Apps	Goals
Derby County	2015–16	Championship	0	0	0	0	0	0	–		0	0
Derby County	2016–17	Championship	0	0	1	0	0	0	–		1	0
Derby County	2017–18	Championship	0	0	0	0	0	0	–		0	0
Derby County	Total		0	0	1	0	0	0	0	0	1	0
Derby County U23	2016–17	–	–		–		–		3 (Note: Appearance(s) in EFL Trophy)	0	3	0
ÍBV (loan)	2016	Úrvalsdeild	9	1	2	0	0	0	0	0	11	1
Coventry City (loan)	2016–17	League One	4	0	0	0	0	0	0	0	4	0
Grimsby Town (loan)	2017–18	League Two	9	1	0	0	0	0	0	0	9	1
Grimsby Town	2018–19	League Two	35	3	3	2	1	0	2	0	41	5
Grimsby Town	2019–20	League Two	27	7	0	0	1	0	3	0	31	7
Grimsby Town	Total		71	11	3	2	2	0	5	0	81	13
Chorley (loan)	2019–20	National League	4	3	1	0	0	0	0	0	5	3
Burton Albion	2020–21	League One	14	2	1	0	1	0	0	0	16	2
Bradford City	2020–21	League Two	21	2	0	0	0	0	0	0	21	2
Bradford City	2021–22	League Two	28	8	1	0	1	0	3	0	33	8
Bradford City	Total		49	10	1	0	1	0	3	0	54	10
Lincoln City	2022–23	League One	20	0	1	0	3	0	5	1	29	1
Grimsby Town	2023–24	League Two	17	0	0	0	1	0	1	0	19	0
Grimsby Town	2024–25	League Two	17	2	0	0	2	0	0	0	19	2
Grimsby Town	2025–26	League Two	41	10	4	1	3	1	2 (Note: Appearance(s) in League Two Play-offs)	0	50	12
Grimsby Town	2026–27	League Two	14	0	1	0	1	0	1	0	17	0
Grimsby Town	Total		89	12	5	1	7	1	4	0	105	14
Career total			260	39	15	3	14	1	20	1	310	44
