= Jayden Sweeney =

English footballer (born 2001)

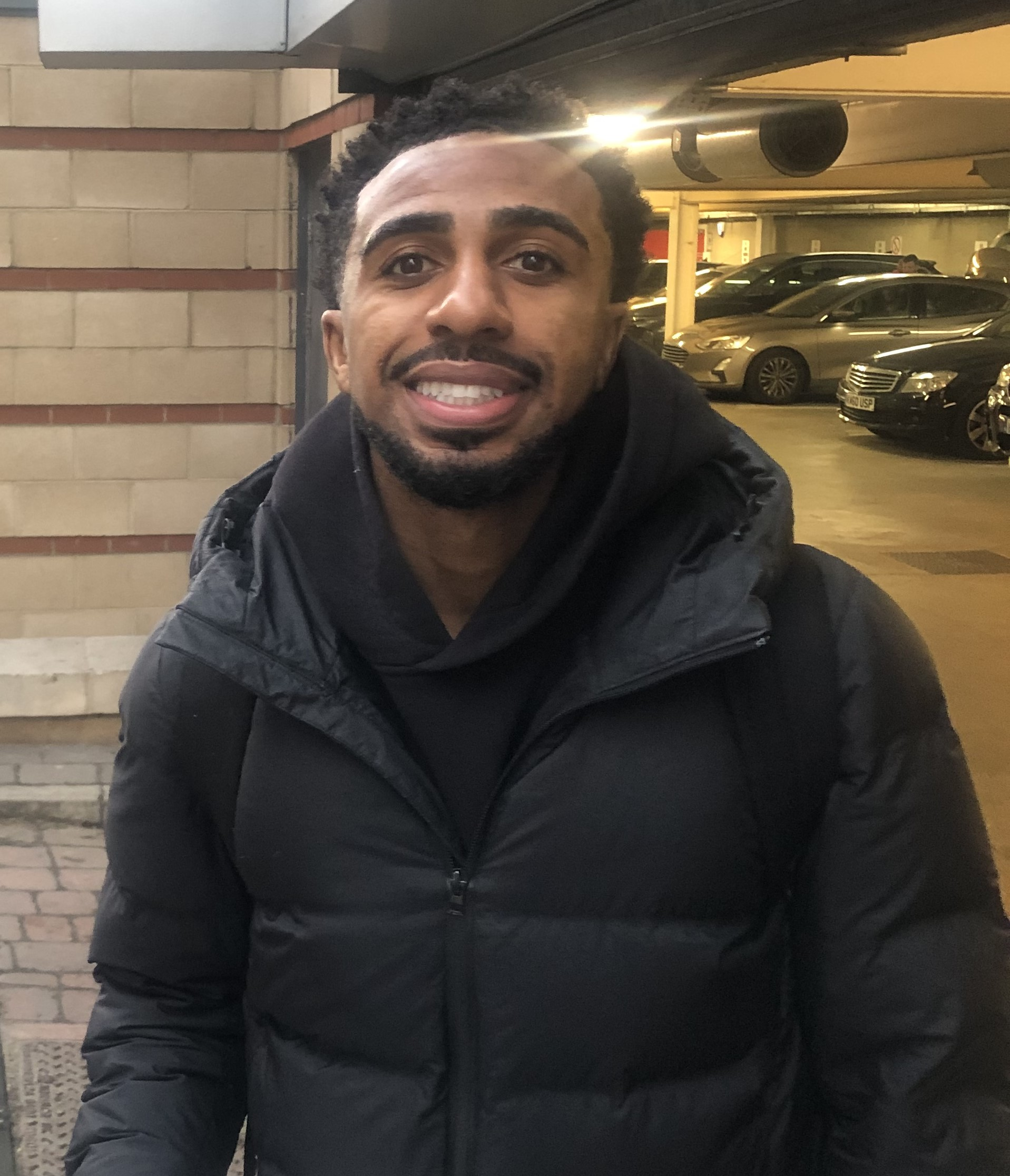
- Jayden Sweeney in 2024.

Personal information
- Full name: Jayden Deslandes Sweeney
- Date of birth: 4 December 2001 (age 24)
- Place of birth: Camden, England
- Height: 5 ft 10 in (1.78 m)
- Position: Defender

Team information
- Current team: Grimsby Town
- Number: 3

Youth career
- 2014–2018: Leyton Orient

Senior career*
Years	Team	Apps	(Gls)
2018–2025	Leyton Orient	60	(1)
2019–2020	→ Bishop's Stortford (loan)	6	(1)
2021	→ Wealdstone (loan)	5	(2)
2022	→ Dartford (loan)	4	(0)
2025–	Grimsby Town	37	(3)
- * Club domestic league appearances and goals as of 11:30, 6 November 2026 (UTC)

Jayden Deslandes Sweeney (born 4 December 2001) is an English professional footballer who plays as a defender for EFL League Two club Grimsby Town.

== Career ==
=== Leyton Orient ===
Sweeney made his first-team debut for Leyton Orient in the FA Trophy on 15 December 2018, in a 4–0 win over Beaconsfield Town. He turned professional when he signed a two-year professional contract with the O's in June 2019.

In November 2019, he joined Isthmian League Premier Division club Bishop's Stortford on loan, and scored on his debut in the 2–2 draw at Merstham on 30 November. He made seven appearances in all competitions before returning to Orient in January 2020.

Sweeney made his league debut for Orient in the 3–0 defeat at Salford City on the last day of the 2020–21 season, as an 85th minute substitute for Conor Wilkinson. On 7 August, the first day of the 2021–22 season, he again came on as a late substitute at Salford City, this time for Connor Wood, in a 1–1 draw.

On 19 November 2021, Sweeney joined National League side Wealdstone on a one-month loan deal. He made his first appearance for the club the next day, in a 0–0 draw away to Wrexham. On 23 November 2021, in his second appearance for the club, Sweeney scored twice: opening the scoring and then netting the winner in a 3–2 victory against Dover Athletic. On 18 December 2021, Sweeney was recalled from his loan spell by parent club Leyton Orient.

On 5 March 2022, Sweeney joined Dartford on loan.

On 2 June 2025, Orient said the player would be leaving when his contract expired.

=== Grimsby Town ===
On 30 June 2025, Sweeney signed a two-year contract with Grimsby Town.

Sweeney made his competitive debut for the club on 2 August 2025, starting in a 3–0 home victory over Crawley Town on the opening day of the League Two season. On 27 August, he played in Grimsby's EFL Cup victory over Manchester United, converting a penalty during the shootout as Grimsby won 12–11 following a 2–2 draw.

Sweeney scored his first goals for Grimsby on 27 September, netting twice in a 7–1 home victory over Cheltenham Town.

== Career statistics ==
As of match played 31 October 2026

Appearances and goals by club, season and competition
Club	Season	League			FA Cup		EFL Cup		Other		Total	
Club	Season	Division	Apps	Goals	Apps	Goals	Apps	Goals	Apps	Goals	Apps	Goals
Leyton Orient	2018–19	National League	0	0	0	0	0	0	3 (Note: Appearance(s) in FA Trophy)	0	3	0
Leyton Orient	2019–20	League Two	0	0	0	0	0	0	1 (Note: Appearance(s) in EFL Trophy)	0	1	0
Leyton Orient	2020–21	League Two	1	0	0	0	0	0	2	0	3	0
Leyton Orient	2021–22	League Two	5	0	0	0	0	0	2	0	7	0
Leyton Orient	2022–23	League Two	22	0	0	0	1	0	3	0	26	0
Leyton Orient	2023–24	League One	13	0	1	0	1	0	2	0	17	0
Leyton Orient	2024–25	League One	19	1	3	0	3	0	3	0	28	1
Leyton Orient	Total		60	1	4	0	5	0	16	0	85	1
Bishop's Stortford (loan)	2019–20	Isthmian League Premier Division	6	1	0	0	0	0	1 (Note: Appearance in Velocity Trophy)	0	7	1
Wealdstone (loan)	2021–22	National League	5	2	0	0	0	0	0	0	5	2
Dartford (loan)	2021–22	National League South	4	0	0	0	0	0	1 (Note: Appearance in Kent Senior Cup)	0	5	0
Grimsby Town	2025–26	League Two	27	3	2	0	2	0	1	0	32	3
Grimsby Town	2026–27	League Two	10	0	0	0	1	0	1	1	12	1
Grimsby Town	Total		37	3	2	0	3	0	2	1	44	4
Career total			112	7	2	0	8	0	20	1	146	8

== Honours ==
Leyton Orient

- EFL League Two: 2022–23
