= Harvey Rodgers =

English footballer

Personal information
- Full name: Harvey James Rodgers
- Date of birth: 20 October 1996 (age 30)
- Place of birth: York, North Yorkshire, England
- Height: 6 ft 2 in (1.88 m)
- Position: Defender

Team information
- Current team: Grimsby Town
- Number: 5

Youth career
- –2015: Hull City

Senior career*
Years	Team	Apps	(Gls)
2015–2017	Hull City	0	(0)
2017	→ Accrington Stanley (loan)	19	(1)
2017–2018	Fleetwood Town	0	(0)
2018–2023	Accrington Stanley	108	(4)
2018–2019	→ Hartlepool United (loan)	4	(0)
2023–	Grimsby Town	145	(10)
- * Club domestic league appearances and goals as of 11:59, 6 November 2026 (UTC)

Harvey James Rodgers (born 20 October 1996) is an English professional footballer who plays as a defender for EFL League Two club Grimsby Town.

A product of the Hull City academy, he spent time on loan with Accrington Stanley before signing for Fleetwood Town permanently in 2017. He rejoined Stanley after only six months with Fleetwood and has since spent time on loan with Hartlepool United.

== Career ==
=== Hull City ===
Rodgers came through the youth ranks at Hull City and signed his first professional contract at the beginning of the 2015–16 season, Hull were promoted to the Premier League at the end of his first full season, however he did not play a single first team game.

In January 2017 Rodgers joined Accrington Stanley on loan with fellow Hull City player Jonathan Edwards, He made his league debut against Carlise United.

At the end of the 2016-17 season, Hull City announced that they were offering a new contract to Rodgers.

=== Fleetwood Town ===
In July 2017 Rodgers signed for Fleetwood Town, turning down a new contract with Hull. Rodgers stated that he was "buzzing" that manager Uwe Rosler had wanted to sign him.

On his debut for Fleetwood he was sent off in an EFL Cup defeat to Carlisle United, this would be his only appearance for the club.

=== Accrington Stanley ===
On 31 January 2018, Rodgers returned to Accrington Stanley for an undisclosed fee, signing a two-year deal, upon signing he stated "I am buzzing to be back. I loved every minute of my time, it was my first club away from Hull so it was special,"

In December 2018 Rodgers joined National League side Hartlepool United on loan.

Following a run of five-goals during the 2022–23 season, Rodgers said he was relishing playing boyhood favourites Leeds United in the FA Cup, and joked that he had already practiced his goal celebration. He played the full 90 minutes in a 3–1 defeat.

On 9 July 2021, Rodgers signed a new two-year deal to keep him with the club until the end of the 2022–23 season.

On 20 May 2023, Accrington announced their retained list and confirmed that they were in discussions with Rodgers over a new contract.

=== Grimsby Town ===
On 23 June 2023, Rodgers signed for Grimsby Town on a three-year contract, having turned down a new offer from Accrington.

Rodgers made his competitive debut for the club on 5 August 2023, starting in a goalless draw against AFC Wimbledon on the opening day of the League Two season. He scored his first Grimsby goal on 2 March 2024, netting the only goal of a 1–0 home victory over Forest Green Rovers.

Having previously been used in several positions across the defence, Rodgers became established at right-back during the 2025–26 season. On 27 March 2026, he signed a new contract keeping him at Grimsby until the summer of 2028, with the club holding an option to extend the agreement by a further year.

Rodgers was named in the EFL League Two Team of the Season for the 2025–26 season. He was subsequently named Grimsby Town's Men's Player of the Year at the club's end-of-season awards.

== Style of play ==
Rodgers has principally played as a centre-back, although he is capable of operating across the defensive line. Upon signing him for Grimsby Town in 2023, manager Paul Hurst described Rodgers as a centre-back with sufficient versatility to play in other defensive positions.

During the 2025–26 season, head coach David Artell deployed Rodgers predominantly at right-back. Rodgers said that the position suited his style, explaining that he attempted to support attacks through repeated forward runs while regarding his defensive ability as the strongest part of his game. Artell subsequently described him as an accomplished full-back who was particularly effective in one-on-one defensive situations.

Rodgers combined his defensive responsibilities with three goals, two assists and 31 chances created during the league campaign, while winning 73.2 per cent of his aerial duels. His performances at right-back earned him selection in the EFL League Two Team of the Season.

== Personal life ==
Rodgers was born in York, North Yorkshire. He is a Leeds United supporter.

== Career statistics ==
As of match played 31 October 2026

Appearances and goals by club, season and competition
Club	Season	League			FA Cup		League Cup		Other		Total	
Club	Season	Division	Apps	Goals	Apps	Goals	Apps	Goals	Apps	Goals	Apps	Goals
Accrington Stanley (loan)	2016–17	League Two	19	1	1	0	0	0	0	0	20	1
Fleetwood Town	2017–18	League One	0	0	0	0	1	0	4	0	5	0
Accrington Stanley	2017–18	League Two	5	0	0	0	0	0	0	0	5	0
Accrington Stanley	2018–19	League One	6	0	0	0	1	0	0	0	7	0
Accrington Stanley	2019–20	League One	6	0	0	0	0	0	2	0	8	0
Accrington Stanley	2020–21	League One	28	0	0	0	0	0	1	0	29	0
Accrington Stanley	2021–22	League One	22	0	0	0	2	0	2	0	26	0
Accrington Stanley	2022–23	League One	41	4	5	0	1	0	6	2	53	6
Accrington Stanley	Total		108	4	5	0	4	0	11	2	128	6
Hartlepool United (loan)	2018–19	National League	4	0	0	0	0	0	2	0	6	0
Grimsby Town	2023–24	League Two	42	1	2	0	1	0	2 (Note: Appearances in EFL Trophy)	0	47	1
Grimsby Town	2024–25	League Two	44	4	1	0	2	0	2	0	49	4
Grimsby Town	2025–26	League Two	45	3	4	0	4	0	3	0	56	3
Grimsby Town	2026–27	League Two	14	2	0	0	1	1	0	0	15	3
Grimsby Town	Total		145	10	7	0	8	1	7	0	167	11
Career total			276	15	13	0	13	1	24	2	326	18

== Honours ==
Individual

- EFL League Two Team of the Season: 2025–26
- Grimsby Town Player of the Year: 2025-26
