= Cameron Gardner =

Scottish footballer (born 2005)

Personal information
- Full name: Cameron Alexander Gardner
- Date of birth: 22 September 2005 (age 21)
- Place of birth: Newcastle upon Tyne, England
- Position: Forward

Team information
- Current team: Grimsby Town
- Number: 22

Youth career
- Gateshead
- 2021–: Grimsby Town

Senior career*
Years	Team	Apps	(Gls)
2023–	Grimsby Town	19	(0)
2024	→ Grimsby Borough (loan)	3	(3)

International career
2025–	Scotland U21	1	(0)
- * Club domestic league appearances and goals as of 12:20, 7 May 2026 (UTC)

Cameron Alexander Gardner (born 22 September 2005) is a footballer who plays as a forward for EFL League Two club Grimsby Town. Born in England, he represents Scotland internationally.

== Early life ==
Gardner was born in Newcastle upon Tyne, playing for the Gateshead academy.

== Club career ==
Gardner joined Grimsby Town from Gateshead at the age of sixteen, becoming a first-year scholar ahead of the 2022–23 season. He made his senior debut on 5 September 2023, appearing as a substitute in a 2–0 EFL Trophy defeat away to Barnsley. Later that month, on his eighteenth birthday, he signed his first professional contract, agreeing a three-year deal with the club.

Towards the end of the 2023–24 season, Gardner joined Grimsby Borough on loan for the remainder of the campaign. On 1 April 2024, he scored twice and was named man of the match as Borough defeated local rivals Cleethorpes Town 3–0 in the Northern Premier League Division One East.

After returning to Town, Gardner made his first senior start and his Football League debut on 27 April 2024, playing in a 2–0 defeat away to Crawley Town on the final day of the League Two season.

Gardner scored his first senior goal for Grimsby on 12 November 2024, equalising shortly after half-time in a 3–2 EFL Trophy defeat against Chesterfield. Later that month, he signed a new contract extending his stay with the club until the summer of 2028.

On 12 August 2025, Gardner scored Grimsby's second goal in a 3–1 victory over Shrewsbury Town in the first round of the EFL Cup. He subsequently started as the centre-forward against Manchester United in the second round on 27 August. Gardner had two goals disallowed for offside before Grimsby drew 2–2 and eliminated Manchester United 12–11 in the ensuing penalty shoot-out.

Gardner's progress was interrupted by several injury setbacks. An injury sustained after he scored during a pre-season friendly against Boston United in July 2023 affected his preparation for the beginning of the 2023–24 season. Following another extended absence, he returned to outdoor training as part of his rehabilitation in February 2026. He subsequently suffered a thigh injury while attempting to regain fitness, ruling him out for the remainder of the 2025–26 season. Gardner remained in rehabilitation and had not returned to first-team training by the opening weeks of the 2026–27 season.

== International career ==
On 25 August 2025, it was announced that Gardner had been called up to the Scotland Under-21 squad for the upcoming UEFA European Under-21 Championship qualifying campaign.

== Career statistics ==
As of match played 27 September 2025

Appearances and goals by club, season and competition
Club	Season	League			FA Cup		League Cup		Other		Total	
Club	Season	Division	Apps	Goals	Apps	Goals	Apps	Goals	Apps	Goals	Apps	Goals
Grimsby Town	2023–24	League Two	2	0	0	0	0	0	2 (Note: Appearance(s) in EFL Trophy)	0	4	0
Grimsby Town	2024–25	League Two	11	0	1	0	2	0	3	1	17	1
Grimsby Town	2025–26	League Two	6	0	0	0	2	1	0	0	8	1
Grimsby Town	Total		19	0	1	0	4	1	5	1	29	2
Grimsby Borough (loan)	2023–24	NPL East	3	3	0	0	0	0	0	0	3	3
Career total			22	3	1	0	4	1	5	1	32	5
