= 2025–26 EFL Cup =

66th season of the EFL Cup

Carabao Cup
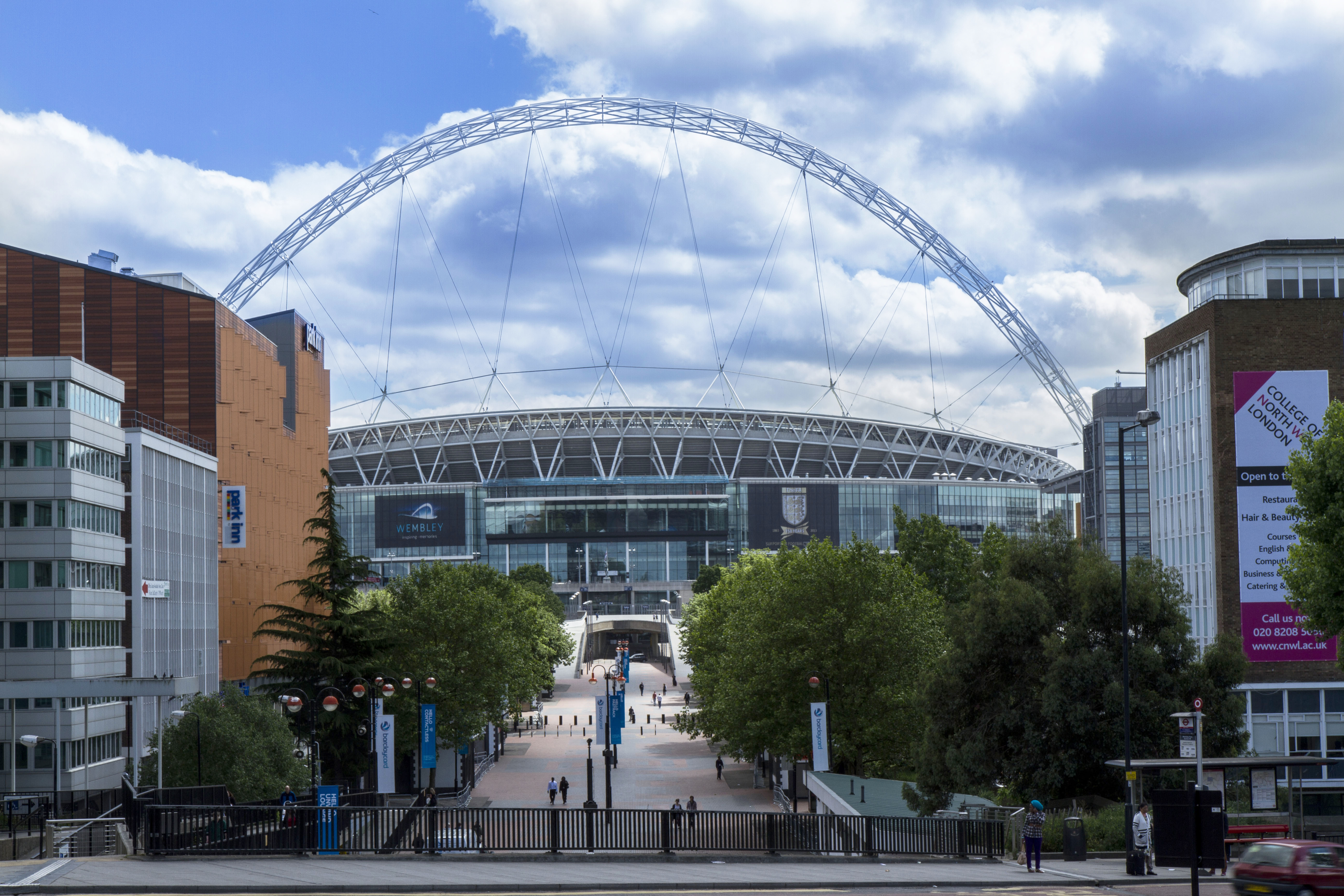
- Wembley Stadium hosted the final

Tournament details
- Country: England; Wales
- Dates: 29 July 2025 – 22 March 2026
- Teams: 92

Final positions
- Champions: Manchester City (9th title)
- Runners-up: Arsenal

Tournament statistics
- Matches played: 93
- Goals scored: 254 (2.73 per match)
- Attendance: 1,489,309 (16,014 per match)
- Top goal scorer(s): Diego Gómez (5 goals)

The 2025–26 EFL Cup was the 66th season of the English Football League Cup. It was sponsored by Carabao Energy Drink and known as the Carabao Cup for sponsorship reasons. The EFL Cup is open to all clubs participating in the Premier League and the English Football League.

The winner of the competition (Manchester City) qualified for the play-off round of the 2026–27 UEFA Conference League.

Newcastle United were the defending champions, having beaten Liverpool in the previous season's final, but were eliminated by Manchester City in the semi-finals, who eventually won the EFL Cup after defeating Arsenal in the final.

== Teams ==
All 92 clubs in the Premier League and English Football League entered the season's EFL Cup. Access was distributed across the top four leagues of the English football league system.

There was a preliminary round before the first round proper due to the number of teams participating in Europe. This round consisted of the two newly promoted sides to 2025–26 League Two – Barnet and Oldham Athletic – and the two lowest finishers not relegated from 2024–25 League Two – Accrington Stanley and Newport County.

Phase	Clubs entering in this round	Clubs advancing from previous round	Number of games	Week commencing
Preliminary round (4 clubs)	4 clubs from EFL League Two (two lowest-ranked clubs not relegated from previous season, and two newly promoted)	N/A	2	4 August 2025
First round (70 clubs)	20 clubs from EFL League Two; 24 clubs from EFL League One; 24 clubs from EFL Championship	2 winners from preliminary round	35	11 August 2025
Second round (46 clubs)	11 Premier League clubs (not involved in European competitions)	35 winners from first round	23	25 August 2025
Third round (32 clubs)	9 Premier League clubs (involved in European competitions)	23 winners from second round	16	15 September 2025; 22 September 2025
Fourth round (16 clubs)	—N/a	16 winners from third round	8	28 October 2025
Quarter-finals (8 clubs)	—N/a	8 winners from fourth round	4	15 December 2025
Semi-finals (4 clubs)	—N/a	4 winners from quarter-finals	4 (two-legged)	12 January 2026; 2 February 2026
Final (2 clubs)	—N/a	2 winners from semi-finals	1	22 March 2026

== Preliminary round ==
A total of four teams played in the preliminary round: two newly promoted sides from National League (tier 5), and two lowest non-relegated League Two sides (tier 4). The draw for this round was split on a geographical basis into northern and southern sections, where teams were drawn against a team from the same section. The draw was made on 26 June 2025 by Shay Given and John Barnes, together with the draw for the first round.

Number of teams per tier still in the competition
Premier League (Note: Premier League teams joined the competition in the second and third rounds.)	Championship (Note: Championship and League One teams joined the competition in the first round.)	League One	League Two (Note: The top 20 League Two teams joined the competition in the first round.)	Total
20 / 20	24 / 24	24 / 24	24 / 24	92 / 92

=== Northern section ===
5 August 2025	Accrington Stanley (4)	3–1	Oldham Athletic (4)	Accrington
19:45 BST	Popoola 10'; Mooney 17'; J. Woods 34'	Report	Ogle 63'	Stadium: Crown Ground; Attendance: 2,042; Referee: Scott Oldham

=== Southern section ===
29 July 2025	Barnet (4)	2–2 (2–4 p)	Newport County (4)	Edgware
19:30 BST	Galvin 90+7'; Browne 90+9'	Report	Antwi 31'; Reindorf 42'	Stadium: The Hive Stadium; Attendance: 1,789; Referee: Darren Drysdale
	Penalties
	Adeniran (penalty scored); Browne (penalty scored); Hugill (penalty missed); Smith (penalty missed)		(penalty missed) Garner; (penalty scored) Lloyd; (penalty scored) Antwi; (penalty scored) Kamwa; (penalty scored) Ca. Evans

== First round ==
A total of 70 teams played in the first round: the two winners from the preliminary round, 20 from League Two (tier 4), 24 from League One (tier 3), and 24 from the Championship (tier 2). The draw for this round was split on a geographical basis into northern and southern sections, where teams were drawn against a team from the same section. The draw was made on 26 June 2025 by Shay Given and John Barnes, together with the draw for the preliminary round.

Number of teams per tier still in the competition
Premier League (Note: Premier League teams joined the competition in the second and third rounds.)	Championship	League One	League Two	Total
20 / 20	24 / 24	24 / 24	22 / 24	90 / 92

=== Northern section ===
12 August 2025	Barrow (4)	0–1	Preston North End (2)	Barrow-in-Furness
19:30 BST		Report	Raglan 66' (o.g.)	Stadium: Holker Street; Attendance: 3,108; Referee: Ross Joyce

12 August 2025	Middlesbrough (2)	0–4	Doncaster Rovers (3)	Middlesbrough
19:30 BST		Report	Close 11'; Ajayi 23'; Gotts 84'; Nixon 90+6'	Stadium: Riverside Stadium; Attendance: 11,979; Referee: Matthew Corlett

12 August 2025	Stockport County (3)	3–1	Crewe Alexandra (4)	Stockport
19:30 BST	Wootton 49'; Lowe 51'; Fiorini 77'	Report	Tezgel 86'	Stadium: Edgeley Park; Attendance: 4,945; Referee: Scott Jackson

12 August 2025	Accrington Stanley (4)	2–1	Peterborough United (3)	Accrington
19:45 BST	Henderson 1'; Mooney 25'	Report	Collins 79'	Stadium: Crown Ground; Attendance: 847; Referee: Aaron Bannister

12 August 2025	Blackburn Rovers (2)	1–2	Bradford City (3)	Blackburn
19:45 BST	De Neve 45+4'	Report	Touray 2'; Swan 4'	Stadium: Ewood Park; Attendance: 9,855; Referee: Anthony Backhouse

12 August 2025	Blackpool (3)	0–1	Port Vale (3)	Blackpool
19:45 BST		Report	Faal 75'	Stadium: Bloomfield Road; Attendance: 2,606; Referee: Simon Mather

12 August 2025	Chesterfield (4)	0–2	Mansfield Town (3)	Chesterfield
19:45 BST		Report	Oates 2'; Evans 59'	Stadium: SMH Group Stadium; Attendance: 9,502; Referee: Adam Herczeg

12 August 2025	Grimsby Town (4)	3–1	Shrewsbury Town (4)	Cleethorpes
19:45 BST	Amaluzor 15'; Gardner 50'; Kabia 90+2' (pen.)	Report	Sang 63'	Stadium: Blundell Park; Attendance: 3,156; Referee: Seb Stockbridge

12 August 2025	Harrogate Town (4)	1–3	Lincoln City (3)	Harrogate
19:45 BST	Taylor 90+5'	Report	Moylan 29'; Draper 60'; Street 68'	Stadium: Wetherby Road; Attendance: 2,119; Referee: Zac Kennard-Kettle

12 August 2025	Salford City (4)	0–0 (2–3 p)	Rotherham United (3)	Salford
19:45 BST		Report		Stadium: Moor Lane; Attendance: 1,409; Referee: Edward Duckworth
	Penalties
	Edwards (penalty missed); Garbutt (penalty scored); Woodburn (penalty scored); Grant (penalty missed); N'Mai (penalty missed)		(penalty scored) Powell; (penalty scored) Holmes; (penalty missed) Gore; (penalty scored) Hall

12 August 2025	Stoke City (2)	0–0 (4–3 p)	Walsall (4)	Stoke-on-Trent
19:45 BST		Report		Stadium: Bet365 Stadium; Attendance: 8,809; Referee: James Bell
	Penalties
	Baker (penalty scored); Donely (penalty scored); Mubama (penalty missed); Bae Jun-ho (penalty scored); Bonham (penalty scored)		(penalty scored) Matt; (penalty missed) Stuttle; (penalty scored) Flint; (penalty scored) Jellis; (penalty missed) Adomah

12 August 2025	West Bromwich Albion (2)	1–1 (2–3 p)	Derby County (2)	West Bromwich
19:45 BST	Heggebø 67'	Report	Ward 90+6'	Stadium: The Hawthorns; Attendance: 8,548; Referee: Thomas Kirk
	Penalties
	Wallace (penalty missed); Maja (penalty missed); Mowatt (penalty scored); Molumby (penalty scored); Grant (penalty missed)		(penalty scored) Goudmijn; (penalty missed) Osborn; (penalty scored) Jackson; (penalty missed) Ward; (penalty scored) Adams

12 August 2025	Wigan Athletic (3)	1–0	Notts County (4)	Wigan
19:45 BST	Mullin 10' (pen.)	Report		Stadium: Brick Community Stadium; Attendance: 2,907; Referee: Ollie Yates

12 August 2025	Wrexham (2)	3–3 (5–3 p)	Hull City (2)	Wrexham
19:45 BST	Lee 31'; Palmer 90+1', 90+2'	Report	McBurnie 36'; Ndala 70'; Crooks 81'	Stadium: Racecourse Ground; Attendance: 10,106; Referee: Josh Smith
	Penalties
	McClean (penalty scored); Lee (penalty scored); Windass (penalty scored); Palmer (penalty scored); Marriott (penalty scored)		(penalty scored) Palmer; (penalty missed) Ndala; (penalty scored) Kamara; (penalty scored) Giles

13 August 2025	Barnsley (3)	2–2 (5–4 p)	Fleetwood Town (4)	Barnsley
19:45 BST	Russell 15'; Mullarkey 59' (o.g.)	Report	Roberts 45+1'; Devonport 90+4'	Stadium: Oakwell; Attendance: 3,259; Referee: Carl Brook
	Penalties
	Connell (penalty scored); Russell (penalty scored); Farrugia (penalty scored); Farrell (penalty scored); Kelly (penalty missed); Cleary (penalty scored)		(penalty missed) Graydon; (penalty scored) Helm; (penalty scored) Devonport; (penalty scored) Hume; (penalty scored) Norwood; (penalty missed) Morrison

13 August 2025	Bolton Wanderers (3)	3–3 (2–4 p)	Sheffield Wednesday (2)	Bolton
19:45 BST	Osei-Tutu 36'; Gale 77'; Cozier-Duberry 90+2'	Report	Siqueira 8'; Ugbo 37'; Johnson 80'	Stadium: Toughsheet Community Stadium; Attendance: 8,208; Referee: Oliver Langford
	Penalties
	Morley (penalty missed); Cozier-Duberry (penalty scored); Burstow (penalty scored); Conway (penalty missed)		(penalty scored) McNeill; (penalty scored) J. Lowe; (penalty scored) M. Lowe; (penalty scored) Palmer

13 August 2025	Huddersfield Town (3)	2–2 (3–2 p)	Leicester City (2)	Huddersfield
19:45 BST	Vost 65'; Ashia 76'	Report	Choudhury 54'; Winks 68'	Stadium: Kirklees Stadium; Attendance: 6,884; Referee: David Webb
	Penalties
	Taylor (penalty missed); May (penalty scored); Castledine (penalty scored); Sørensen (penalty scored)		(penalty missed) Ayew; (penalty scored) Mavididi; (penalty scored) L. Thomas; (penalty missed) El Khannouss; (penalty missed) McAteer

13 August 2025	Birmingham City (2)	2–1	Sheffield United (2)	Birmingham
20:00 BST	Furuhashi 5'; Stansfield 87'	Report	Hamer 72'	Stadium: St Andrew's; Attendance: 16,357; Referee: Gavin Ward

19 August 2025	Tranmere Rovers (4)	1–1 (4–5 p)	Burton Albion (3)	Birkenhead
19:45 BST	Whitaker 37'	Report	Whitfield 10'	Stadium: Prenton Park; Attendance: 3,524; Referee: Simon Mather
	Penalties
	Patrick (penalty scored); Lowe (penalty scored); Harris (penalty scored); Blacker (penalty missed); O'Connor (penalty missed); Norman (penalty scored); Davison (penalty missed)		(penalty missed) Whitfield; (penalty scored) Revan; (penalty scored) Larsson; (penalty missed) Tavares; (penalty scored) Williams; (penalty scored) Akoto; (penalty scored) Delap
Note: Fixture was initially scheduled for 12 August, but was postponed due to power failure.

=== Southern section ===
12 August 2025	Swansea City (2)	3–1	Crawley Town (4)	Swansea
19:00 BST	Ronald 4'; Wales 67'; Galbraith 90+4'	Report	Tshimanga 75'	Stadium: Swansea.com Stadium; Attendance: 5,095; Referee: Ben Speedie

12 August 2025	Newport County (4)	0–1	Millwall (2)	Newport
19:30 BST		Report	Leonard 60'	Stadium: Rodney Parade; Attendance: 3,670; Referee: Scott Oldham

12 August 2025	Bristol City (2)	2–0	Milton Keynes Dons (4)	Bristol
19:45 BST	Knight 6'; Hirakawa 61'	Report		Stadium: Ashton Gate; Attendance: 10,280; Referee: Bobby Madley

12 August 2025	Bristol Rovers (4)	0–2	Cambridge United (4)	Bristol
19:45 BST		Report	Appéré 29'; Loft 75'	Stadium: Memorial Stadium; Attendance: 2,681; Referee: Oliver Mackey

12 August 2025	Cardiff City (3)	2–1	Swindon Town (4)	Cardiff
19:45 BST	Ashford 21'; R. Colwill 45+2'	Report	Ehibhatiomhan 55'	Stadium: Cardiff City Stadium; Attendance: 7,160; Referee: Elliot Bell

12 August 2025	Charlton Athletic (2)	3–1	Stevenage (3)	Charlton
19:45 BST	Leaburn 27'; Fullah 36'; Berry 77'	Report	Freestone 86'	Stadium: The Valley; Attendance: 4,092; Referee: Craig Hicks

12 August 2025	Coventry City (2)	1–0	Luton Town (3)	Coventry
19:45 BST	Simms 57'	Report		Stadium: Coventry Building Society Arena; Attendance: 10,595; Referee: Leigh Doughty

12 August 2025	Gillingham (4)	1–1 (2–4 p)	AFC Wimbledon (3)	Gillingham
19:45 BST	Coleman 83'	Report	Hackford 32'	Stadium: Priestfield Stadium; Attendance: 2,209; Referee: Neil Hair
	Penalties
	Clark (penalty scored); J. Williams (penalty missed); McKenzie (penalty scored); Andrews (penalty missed)		(penalty scored) Stevens; (penalty scored) Kelly; (penalty scored) Hippolyte; (penalty scored) Smith

12 August 2025	Leyton Orient (3)	0–1	Wycombe Wanderers (3)	Leyton
19:45 BST		Report	Simpson 90+4' (o.g.)	Stadium: Brisbane Road; Attendance: 3,293; Referee: Tom Nield

12 August 2025	Northampton Town (3)	0–1	Southampton (2)	Northampton
19:45 BST		Report	Fernandes 48'	Stadium: Sixfields Stadium; Attendance: 4,381; Referee: David Rock

12 August 2025	Oxford United (2)	1–0	Colchester United (4)	Oxford
19:45 BST	Goodrham 9'	Report		Stadium: Kassam Stadium; Attendance: 3,453; Referee: Jacob Miles

12 August 2025	Plymouth Argyle (3)	3–2	Queens Park Rangers (2)	Plymouth
19:45 BST	Wiredu 48'; Oseni 54', 78'	Report	Bennie 21'; Kolli 45+2'	Stadium: Home Park; Attendance: 10,884; Referee: John Busby

12 August 2025	Portsmouth (2)	1–2	Reading (3)	Portsmouth
19:45 BST	Singerr 90+3'	Report	Garcia 34'; Ehibhatiomhan 38'	Stadium: Fratton Park; Attendance: 14,525; Referee: Farai Hallam

12 August 2025	Watford (2)	1–2	Norwich City (2)	Watford
19:45 BST	Baah 68'	Report	Sargent 10'; Núñez 24'	Stadium: Vicarage Road; Attendance: 9,243; Referee: Dean Whitestone

12 August 2025	Bromley (4)	1–1 (5–4 p)	Ipswich Town (2)	Bromley
20:00 BST	Elerewe 45'	Report	Johnson 53'	Stadium: Hayes Lane; Attendance: 3,005; Referee: Matthew Russell
	Penalties
	Cheek (penalty scored); Charles (penalty missed); Arthurs (penalty scored); Odutayo (penalty scored); Pinnock (penalty scored); Ifill (penalty scored)		(penalty missed) Hirst; (penalty scored) Szmodics; (penalty scored) Johnson; (penalty scored) Young; (penalty scored) Chaplin; (penalty missed) Al-Hamadi

13 August 2025	Cheltenham Town (4)	2–0	Exeter City (3)	Cheltenham
19:45 BST	Wilson 28'; Broom 55'	Report		Stadium: Whaddon Road; Attendance: 2,109; Referee: Alan Young

== Second round ==
A total of 46 teams played in the second round: the 11 Premier League clubs not involved in European competitions entered at this stage, along with the 35 winners from the first round. The draw for this round was split on a geographical basis into northern and southern sections, where teams were drawn against a team from the same section. The draw was made on 13 August 2025 by Courtney Sweetman-Kirk, Lee Hendrie and Clinton Morrison.

Number of teams per tier still in the competition
Premier League (Note: The nine Premier League teams involved in European competitions joined the competition in the third round.)	Championship	League One	League Two	Total
20 / 20	14 / 24	16 / 24	5 / 24	55 / 92

=== Northern section ===
26 August 2025	Accrington Stanley (4)	0–2	Doncaster Rovers (3)	Accrington
19:45 BST		Report	Bailey 75'; Close 82'	Stadium: Crown Ground; Attendance: 1,270; Referee: Zac Kennard-Kettle

26 August 2025	Barnsley (3)	2–1	Rotherham United (3)	Barnsley
19:45 BST	Russell 59'; Phillips 68'	Report	Martha 19'	Stadium: Oakwell; Attendance: 5,803; Referee: Matthew Corlett

26 August 2025	Birmingham City (2)	0–1	Port Vale (3)	Birmingham
19:45 BST		Report	Headley 45'	Stadium: St Andrew's; Attendance: 21,052; Referee: Ben Speedie

26 August 2025	Burnley (1)	2–1	Derby County (2)	Burnley
19:45 BST	Ramsey 4'; Sonne 90+1'	Report	Clark 35'	Stadium: Turf Moor; Attendance: 7,019; Referee: Andrew Kitchen

26 August 2025	Burton Albion (3)	0–1	Lincoln City (3)	Burton upon Trent
19:45 BST		Report	House 89'	Stadium: Pirelli Stadium; Attendance: 1,837; Referee: Oliver Mackey

26 August 2025	Preston North End (2)	2–3	Wrexham (2)	Preston
19:45 BST	Dobbin 7'; Lindsay 32'	Report	Hardie 11'; Ashfield 59'; K. Moore 90+2'	Stadium: Deepdale; Attendance: 12,350; Referee: Adam Herczeg

26 August 2025	Stoke City (2)	0–3	Bradford City (3)	Stoke-on-Trent
19:45 BST		Report	Swan 12'; Halliday 31'; Lapslie 62'	Stadium: Bet365 Stadium; Attendance: 9,947; Referee: Leigh Doughty

26 August 2025	Sunderland (1)	1–1 (5–6 p)	Huddersfield Town (3)	Sunderland
19:45 BST	Guiu 84'	Report	Castledine 9'	Stadium: Stadium of Light; Attendance: 22,249; Referee: Dean Whitestone
	Penalties
	Le Fée (penalty scored); Roberts (penalty scored); Neil (penalty scored); Rigg (penalty scored); Seelt (penalty scored); Aleksić (penalty missed)		(penalty scored) Kane; (penalty scored) Radulović; (penalty scored) Harness; (penalty scored) Wiles; (penalty scored) Gooch; (penalty scored) Kasumu

26 August 2025	Wigan Athletic (3)	1–0	Stockport County (3)	Wigan
19:45 BST	Murray 84'	Report		Stadium: Brick Community Stadium; Attendance: 3,119; Referee: Tom Reeves

26 August 2025	Sheffield Wednesday (2)	1–1 (3–0 p)	Leeds United (1)	Sheffield
20:00 BST	Lowe 63'	Report	Bogle 81'	Stadium: Hillsborough Stadium; Attendance: 7,801; Referee: Robert Jones
	Penalties
	Bannan (penalty scored); Ugbo (penalty scored); Palmer (penalty scored)		(penalty missed) Piroe; (penalty missed) Calvert-Lewin; (penalty missed) Longstaff

27 August 2025	Everton (1)	2–0	Mansfield Town (3)	Liverpool
19:45 BST	Alcaraz 51'; Beto 89'	Report		Stadium: Hill Dickinson Stadium; Attendance: 48,583; Referee: Thomas Bramall

27 August 2025	Grimsby Town (4)	2–2 (12–11 p)	Manchester United (1)	Cleethorpes
20:00 BST	Vernam 22'; Warren 30'	Report	Mbeumo 75'; Maguire 89'	Stadium: Blundell Park; Attendance: 8,647; Referee: Tony Harrington
	Penalties
	Kabia (penalty scored); Burns (penalty scored); Oduor (penalty missed); Staunton (penalty scored); Brown (penalty scored); McJannet (penalty scored); Turi (penalty scored); Sweeney (penalty scored); Khouri (penalty scored); Warren (penalty scored); Pym (penalty scored); Kabia (penalty scored); Burns (penalty scored)		(penalty scored) Fernandes; (penalty scored) Mbeumo; (penalty scored) Mount; (penalty scored) Dalot; (penalty missed) Cunha; (penalty scored) Zirkzee; (penalty scored) Maguire; (penalty scored) Mainoo; (penalty scored) De Ligt; (penalty scored) Šeško; (penalty scored) Onana; (penalty scored) Fernandes; (penalty missed) Mbeumo

=== Southern section ===
26 August 2025	Reading (3)	2–1	AFC Wimbledon (3)	Reading
19:00 BST	Fraser 24'; Camará 70'	Report	Bugiel 26'	Stadium: Madejski Stadium; Attendance: 3,860; Referee: Jacob Miles

26 August 2025	Cambridge United (4)	3–1	Charlton Athletic (2)	Cambridge
19:30 BST	Brophy 15'; Kouassi 29'; Bradshaw 55'	Report	Fullah 43'	Stadium: Abbey Stadium; Attendance: 3,231; Referee: David Rock

26 August 2025	Wolverhampton Wanderers (1)	3–2	West Ham United (1)	Wolverhampton
19:30 BST	R. Gomes 43'; Larsen 82', 84'	Report	Souček 50'; Paquetá 63'	Stadium: Molineux Stadium; Attendance: 19,561; Referee: Darren England

26 August 2025	Bournemouth (1)	0–2	Brentford (1)	Bournemouth
19:45 BST		Report	Carvalho 34'; Thiago 65'	Stadium: Dean Court; Attendance: 10,499; Referee: Michael Salisbury

26 August 2025	Bromley (4)	1–1 (4–5 p)	Wycombe Wanderers (3)	Bromley
19:45 BST	Arthurs 35'	Report	Westergaard 5'	Stadium: Hayes Lane; Attendance: 2,310; Referee: Thomas Parsons
	Penalties
	Cheek (penalty scored); Arthurs (penalty missed); Odutayo (penalty scored); Ifill (penalty scored); Webster (penalty missed); Cameron (penalty scored); Hondermarck (penalty missed)		(penalty scored) Boyd-Munce; (penalty missed) Savage; (penalty scored) Hartridge; (penalty scored) Lowry; (penalty missed) Westergaard; (penalty scored) Back; (penalty scored) Stones

26 August 2025	Cardiff City (3)	3–0	Cheltenham Town (4)	Cardiff
19:45 BST	Davies 11'; Chambers 32'; J. Colwill 76'	Report		Stadium: Cardiff City Stadium; Attendance: 6,233; Referee: Edward Duckworth

26 August 2025	Millwall (2)	2–1	Coventry City (2)	Bermondsey
19:45 BST	Luongo 33'; Grant 76'	Report	Wright 89' (pen.)	Stadium: The Den; Attendance: 7,048; Referee: Stephen Martin

26 August 2025	Norwich City (2)	0–3	Southampton (2)	Norwich
19:45 BST		Report	Archer 42'; Fraser 62'; Matsuki 81'	Stadium: Carrow Road; Attendance: 17,351; Referee: Tom Nield

26 August 2025	Swansea City (2)	1–1 (5–3 p)	Plymouth Argyle (3)	Swansea
19:45 BST	Vipotnik 22'	Report	Sarpong-Wiredu 45'	Stadium: Swansea.com Stadium; Attendance: 7,279; Referee: Elliott Bell
	Penalties
	Vipotnik (penalty scored); Galbraith (penalty scored); Cullen (penalty scored); Cabango (penalty scored); Widell (penalty scored)		(penalty scored) Tolaj; (penalty missed) Sorinola; (penalty scored) Watts; (penalty scored) Mumba

27 August 2025	Fulham (1)	2–0	Bristol City (2)	Fulham
19:45 BST	Tanner 8' (o.g.); Jiménez 21'	Report		Stadium: Craven Cottage; Attendance: 11,749; Referee: Lewis Smith

27 August 2025	Oxford United (2)	0–6	Brighton & Hove Albion (1)	Oxford
19:45 BST		Report	Boscagli 13'; Gruda 20'; Gómez 60'; Tzimas 71', 77'; Watson 86'	Stadium: Kassam Stadium; Attendance: 9,010; Referee: Oliver Langford

== Third round ==
A total of 32 teams played in the third round: the nine Premier League clubs involved in European competitions (Arsenal, Aston Villa, Chelsea, Crystal Palace, Liverpool, Manchester City, Newcastle United, Nottingham Forest and Tottenham Hotspur) entered at this stage along with the 23 winners from the second round. The draw was made on 27 August 2025 by Jobi McAnuff and Phil Jones, where conditions were implemented to ensure clubs participating in the UEFA Champions League did not draw clubs participating in the UEFA Europa League due to fixture clashes.

Number of teams per tier still in the competition
Premier League	Championship	League One	League Two	Total
15 / 20	5 / 24	10 / 24	2 / 24	32 / 92

16 September 2025	Sheffield Wednesday (2)	0–1	Grimsby Town (4)	Sheffield
19:45 BST		Report	Kabia 49'	Stadium: Hillsborough Stadium; Attendance: 9,424; Referee: Elliott Bell

16 September 2025	Brentford (1)	1–1 (4–2 p)	Aston Villa (1)	Brentford
20:00 BST	Hickey 57'	Report	Elliott 43'	Stadium: Brentford Community Stadium; Attendance: 15,895; Referee: John Brooks
	Penalties
	Carvalho (penalty scored); Nelson (penalty scored); Yarmolyuk (penalty scored); Damsgaard (penalty scored)		(penalty missed) McGinn; (penalty scored) Watkins; (penalty scored) Buendía; (penalty missed) Cash

16 September 2025	Crystal Palace (1)	1–1 (4–2 p)	Millwall (2)	Selhurst
20:00 BST	Richards 72'	Report	Leonard 90+1'	Stadium: Selhurst Park; Attendance: 16,754; Referee: John Busby
	Penalties
	Mateta (penalty scored); Richards (penalty scored); Devenny (penalty scored); Kamada (penalty scored)		(penalty missed) Crama; (penalty scored) Harding; (penalty scored) Leonard; (penalty missed) Emakhu

17 September 2025	Swansea City (2)	3–2	Nottingham Forest (1)	Swansea
20:00 BST	Burgess 68', 90+7'; Vipotnik 90+3'	Report	Igor Jesus 15', 45+1'	Stadium: Swansea.com Stadium; Attendance: 11,354; Referee: Bobby Madley

23 September 2025	Barnsley (3)	0–6	Brighton & Hove Albion (1)	Barnsley
19:45 BST		Report	Gómez 9', 21', 33', 68'; Howell 87'; Ayari 89'	Stadium: Oakwell; Attendance: 7,790; Referee: Tom Reeves

23 September 2025	Burnley (1)	1–2	Cardiff City (3)	Burnley
19:45 BST	Flemming 56'	Report	J. Colwill 30'; Robinson 35'	Stadium: Turf Moor; Attendance: 6,010; Referee: David Webb

23 September 2025	Fulham (1)	1–0	Cambridge United (4)	Fulham
19:45 BST	Smith Rowe 66'	Report		Stadium: Craven Cottage; Attendance: 16,254; Referee: Ruebyn Ricardo

23 September 2025	Lincoln City (3)	1–2	Chelsea (1)	Lincoln
19:45 BST	Street 42'	Report	George 48'; Buonanotte 50'	Stadium: Sincil Bank; Attendance: 10,214; Referee: Matt Donohue

23 September 2025	Wigan Athletic (3)	0–2	Wycombe Wanderers (3)	Wigan
19:45 BST		Report	Boyd-Munce 32'; McNeilly 62'	Stadium: Brick Community Stadium; Attendance: 2,077; Referee: Edward Duckworth

23 September 2025	Wolverhampton Wanderers (1)	2–0	Everton (1)	Wolverhampton
19:45 BST	Munetsi 29'; Arokodare 87'	Report		Stadium: Molineux Stadium; Attendance: 18,758; Referee: Craig Pawson

23 September 2025	Wrexham (2)	2–0	Reading (3)	Wrexham
19:45 BST	Broadhead 57'; Smith 70'	Report		Stadium: Racecourse Ground; Attendance: 9,457; Referee: Simon Mather

23 September 2025	Liverpool (1)	2–1	Southampton (2)	Liverpool
20:00 BST	Isak 43'; Ekitike 85'	Report	Charles 76'	Stadium: Anfield; Attendance: 59,518; Referee: Thomas Bramall

24 September 2025	Huddersfield Town (3)	0–2	Manchester City (1)	Huddersfield
19:45 BST		Report	Foden 18'; Savinho 74'	Stadium: Kirklees Stadium; Attendance: 22,052; Referee: Michael Salisbury

24 September 2025	Newcastle United (1)	4–1	Bradford City (3)	Newcastle upon Tyne
19:45 BST	Joelinton 17', 75'; Osula 19', 87'	Report	Cook 79'	Stadium: St James' Park; Attendance: 51,249; Referee: Thomas Kirk

24 September 2025	Tottenham Hotspur (1)	3–0	Doncaster Rovers (3)	Tottenham
19:45 BST	Palhinha 14'; McGrath 17' (o.g.); Johnson 90+4'	Report		Stadium: Tottenham Hotspur Stadium; Attendance: 42,473; Referee: Andrew Madley

24 September 2025	Port Vale (3)	0–2	Arsenal (1)	Stoke-on-Trent
20:00 BST		Report	Eze 8'; Trossard 86'	Stadium: Vale Park; Attendance: 16,326; Referee: Andrew Kitchen

== Fourth round ==
The 16 winners from the third round played in the fourth round. League Two side Grimsby Town were the lowest-ranked team in the draw, which was made on 24 September 2025 by Jamie Redknapp and Michael Brown.

Number of teams per tier still in the competition
Premier League	Championship	League One	League Two	Total
11 / 20	2 / 24	2 / 24	1 / 24	16 / 92

28 October 2025	Grimsby Town (4)	0–5	Brentford (1)	Cleethorpes
19:45 GMT		Report	Jensen 22'; Lewis-Potter 26'; Nelson 43'; Carvalho 54' (pen.); Collins 75'	Stadium: Blundell Park; Attendance: 8,637; Referee: Thomas Kirk

28 October 2025	Wycombe Wanderers (3)	1–1 (4–5 p)	Fulham (1)	High Wycombe
19:45 GMT	Woodrow 4'	Report	King 48'	Stadium: Adams Park; Attendance: 9,709; Referee: Bobby Madley
	Penalties
	Henderson (penalty missed); Leahy (penalty scored); Boyd-Munce (penalty scored); Hagelskjær (penalty scored); Bell (penalty scored); Onyedinma (penalty missed); McNeilly (penalty missed)		(penalty scored) Lukić; (penalty scored) Traoré; (penalty scored) Kevin; (penalty scored) Iwobi; (penalty missed) Sessegnon; (penalty missed) Kusi-Asare; (penalty scored) Diop

28 October 2025	Wrexham (2)	1–2	Cardiff City (3)	Wrexham
20:00 GMT	K. Moore 52'	Report	Salech 13'; Fish 71'	Stadium: Racecourse Ground; Attendance: 10,563; Referee: Gavin Ward

29 October 2025	Arsenal (1)	2–0	Brighton & Hove Albion (1)	Holloway
19:45 GMT	Nwaneri 57'; Saka 76'	Report		Stadium: Emirates Stadium; Attendance: 59,292; Referee: Sam Barrott

29 October 2025	Liverpool (1)	0–3	Crystal Palace (1)	Liverpool
19:45 GMT		Report	Sarr 41', 45'; Pino 88'	Stadium: Anfield; Attendance: 60,420; Referee: Craig Pawson

29 October 2025	Swansea City (2)	1–3	Manchester City (1)	Swansea
19:45 GMT	Franco 12'	Report	Doku 39'; Marmoush 77'; Cherki 90+3'	Stadium: Swansea.com Stadium; Attendance: 20,490; Referee: Jarred Gillett

29 October 2025	Wolverhampton Wanderers (1)	3–4	Chelsea (1)	Wolverhampton
19:45 GMT	Arokodare 48'; Wolfe 73', 90+1'	Report	Santos 5'; George 15'; Estêvão 41'; Gittens 89'	Stadium: Molineux Stadium; Attendance: 24,449; Referee: Thomas Bramall

29 October 2025	Newcastle United (1)	2–0	Tottenham Hotspur (1)	Newcastle upon Tyne
20:00 GMT	Schär 24'; Woltemade 50'	Report		Stadium: St James' Park; Attendance: 51,216; Referee: Chris Kavanagh

== Quarter-finals ==
The eight winners from the fourth round played in the quarter-finals. League One side Cardiff City were the only non-Premier League team in the draw, which was made on 29 October 2025 by Jobi McAnuff and Jamie Redknapp.

Number of teams per tier still in the competition
Premier League	Championship	League One	League Two	Total
7 / 20	0 / 24	1 / 24	0 / 24	8 / 92

16 December 2025	Cardiff City (3)	1–3	Chelsea (1)	Cardiff
20:00 GMT	Turnbull 75'	Report	Garnacho 57', 90+3'; Neto 82'	Stadium: Cardiff City Stadium; Attendance: 33,027; Referee: Tony Harrington

17 December 2025	Manchester City (1)	2–0	Brentford (1)	Manchester
19:30 GMT	Cherki 32'; Savinho 67'	Report		Stadium: City of Manchester Stadium; Attendance: 38,254; Referee: Sam Barrott

17 December 2025	Newcastle United (1)	2–1	Fulham (1)	Newcastle upon Tyne
20:15 GMT	Wissa 10'; Miley 90+2'	Report	Lukić 16'	Stadium: St James' Park; Attendance: 51,301; Referee: Darren England

23 December 2025	Arsenal (1)	1–1 (8–7 p)	Crystal Palace (1)	Holloway
20:00 GMT	Lacroix 80' (o.g.)	Report	Guéhi 90+5'	Stadium: Emirates Stadium; Attendance: 59,497; Referee: Stuart Attwell
	Penalties
	Ødegaard (penalty scored); Rice (penalty scored); Saka (penalty scored); Trossard (penalty scored); Merino (penalty scored); Calafiori (penalty scored); Timber (penalty scored); Saliba (penalty scored)		(penalty scored) Mateta; (penalty scored) Devenny; (penalty scored) Hughes; (penalty scored) Sosa; (penalty scored) Lerma; (penalty scored) Wharton; (penalty scored) Uche; (penalty missed) Lacroix

== Semi-finals ==
The four winners from the quarter-finals play in the semi-finals. The draw was made on 17 December 2025 by Jamie Redknapp and Shay Given.

Number of teams per tier still in the competition
Premier League	Championship	League One	League Two	Total
4 / 20	0 / 24	0 / 24	0 / 24	4 / 92

Team 1	Agg.	Team 2	1st leg	2nd leg
Newcastle United (1)	1–5	Manchester City (1)	0–2	1–3
Chelsea (1)	2–4	Arsenal (1)	2–3	0–1

13 January 2026
20:00 GMT

Newcastle United (1)	0–2	Manchester City (1)
	Report	Semenyo 53'; Cherki 90+8'

St James' Park, Newcastle upon Tyne
Attendance: 51,392
Referee: Chris Kavanagh
4 February 2026
20:00 GMT

Manchester City (1)	3–1	Newcastle United (1)
Marmoush 7', 29'; Reijnders 32'	Report	Elanga 62'

City of Manchester Stadium, Manchester
Attendance: 41,834
Referee: Tony Harrington

Manchester City won 5–1 on aggregate.

14 January 2026
20:00 GMT

Chelsea (1)	2–3	Arsenal (1)
Garnacho 57', 83'	Report	White 7'; Gyökeres 49'; Zubimendi 71'

Stamford Bridge, Fulham
Attendance: 39,243
Referee: Simon Hooper
3 February 2026
20:00 GMT

Arsenal (1)	1–0	Chelsea (1)
Havertz 90+7'	Report

Emirates Stadium, Holloway
Attendance: 59,452
Referee: Peter Bankes

Arsenal won 4–2 on aggregate.

== Final ==
Number of teams per tier still in the competition
Premier League	Championship	League One	League Two	Total
2 / 20	0 / 24	0 / 24	0 / 24	2 / 92

22 March 2026
16:30 GMT

Arsenal	0–2	Manchester City
	Report	O'Reilly 60', 64'

Wembley Stadium, London
Attendance: 88,486
Referee: Peter Bankes (Lancashire)

== Top goalscorers ==
Rank	Player	Club	Goals
1	(Paraguay) Diego Gómez	Brighton & Hove Albion	5
2	(Argentina) Alejandro Garnacho	Chelsea	4
3	(France) Rayan Cherki	Manchester City	3
3	(Egypt) Omar Marmoush	Manchester City	3
5	28 players		2
