= Henry Brown (footballer) =

English footballer (born 2007)

Personal information
- Full name: Henry Oscar Brown
- Date of birth: 20 April 2007 (age 19)
- Place of birth: Grimsby, England
- Position: Midfielder

Team information
- Current team: Grimsby Town
- Number: 23

Youth career
- –2024: Grimsby Town

Senior career*
| Years | Team | Apps | (Gls) |
| 2024– | Grimsby Town | 3 | (0) |
| 2026 | → Gainsborough Trinity (loan) | 7 | (1) |
| 2026 | → Cleethorpes Town (loan) | 2 | (0) |
- * Club domestic league appearances and goals as of 10 November 2026

Henry Oscar Brown (born 20 April 2007) is an English professional footballer who plays as a midfielder for EFL League Two club Grimsby Town.

== Career ==
=== Grimsby Town ===
Brown joined Grimsby Town's academy at under-nine level and progressed through the club's youth teams. He made his first-team debut on 12 November 2024 in a 3–2 defeat by Chesterfield in the EFL Trophy. Brown made his league debut as a late substitute in a 1–0 defeat by Salford City on 15 March 2025.

On 30 May 2025, Brown signed his first professional contract, agreeing a two-year deal with Grimsby. On 27 August, he appeared as a second-half substitute as Grimsby drew 2–2 with Manchester United in the second round of the EFL Cup. Brown converted Grimsby's fifth penalty in the subsequent shoot-out, which the club won 12–11.

On 28 January 2026, Brown joined Northern Premier League Premier Division club Gainsborough Trinity on an initial 28-day loan. Three days later, he scored his first senior goal on his Gainsborough debut, coming on as a substitute and equalising in a 1–1 draw with Hednesford Town. His loan was subsequently extended before Grimsby recalled him on 3 April for the closing weeks of the season.

On 11 September 2026, Brown joined fellow Northern Premier League club Cleethorpes Town on an initial one-month youth loan. He scored his first goal for Cleethorpes on 26 September, having also won a penalty after coming on as a substitute, during a 5–1 victory over Lancaster City in the third qualifying round of the FA Trophy. The loan was extended in October.

== Career statistics ==
As of match played 8 November 2026

Appearances and goals by club, season and competition
| Club | Season | League | | | FA Cup | | League Cup | | Other | | Total | |
| Club | Season | Division | Apps | Goals | Apps | Goals | Apps | Goals | Apps | Goals | Apps | Goals |
|---|---|---|---|---|---|---|---|---|---|---|---|---|
| Grimsby Town | 2024–25 | League Two | 1 | 0 | 0 | 0 | 0 | 0 | 1 (Note: Appearance(s) in EFL Trophy) | 0 | 2 | 0 |
| Grimsby Town | 2025–26 | League Two | 2 | 0 | 0 | 0 | 2 | 0 | 1 | 0 | 5 | 0 |
| Grimsby Town | 2026–27 | League Two | 0 | 0 | 0 | 0 | 0 | 0 | 2 | 0 | 2 | 0 |
| Grimsby Town | Total | | 3 | 0 | 0 | 0 | 2 | 0 | 4 | 0 | 9 | 0 |
| Gainsborough Trinity (loan) | 2025–26 | Northern Premier League | 7 | 1 | 0 | 0 | 0 | 0 | 0 | 0 | 7 | 1 |
| Cleethorpes Town (loan) | 2026–27 | Northern Premier League | 2 | 0 | 0 | 0 | 0 | 0 | 1 (Note: Appearance(s) in FA Trophy) | 1 | 3 | 1 |
| Career total | | | 12 | 1 | 0 | 0 | 2 | 0 | 5 | 1 | 19 | 2 |
