= 2023–24 FA Youth Cup =

Tournament details
- Teams: 630

Final positions
- Champions: Manchester City (4th Title)
- Runners-up: Leeds United (1st Runner Up Finish)

Tournament statistics
- Top goal scorer: (England) Kavalli Heywood Millwall (7 Goals)

The 2023–24 FA Youth Cup was the 72nd edition of the competition.

The competition consisted of several rounds and was preceded by a qualifying competition, starting with two preliminary rounds which was followed by three qualifying rounds for non-League teams. The Football League teams entered the draw thereafter, with League One and League Two teams entered in the first round proper, and Premier League and Championship teams entered in the third round proper.

A record 630 clubs were accepted into the competition. The current defending Champions are West Ham United who defeated Arsenal 5–1 at the Emirates Stadium in front of 34,127 fans.

== Calendar ==
| Round | Matches played from | Matches | Clubs | New entries |
|---|---|---|---|---|
| Extra preliminary round | 14 August 2023 | 96 | 630 → 534 | 192 |
| Preliminary round | 4 September 2023 | 189 | 534 → 345 | 282 |
| First round qualifying | 18 September 2023 | 116 | 345 → 229 | 43 |
| Second round qualifying | 2 October 2023 | 70 | 229 → 159 | 24 |
| Third round qualifying | 16 October 2023 | 35 | 159 → 124 | |
| First round | 4 November 2023 | 40 | 124 → 84 | 45 |
| Second round | 25 November 2023 | 20 | 84 → 64 | |
| Third round | 16 December 2023 | 32 | 64 → 32 | 44 |
| Fourth round | 20 January 2024 | 16 | 32 → 16 | |
| Fifth round | 10 February 2024 | 8 | 16 → 8 | |
| Quarter-finals | 9 March 2024 | 4 | 8 → 4 | |
| Semi-finals | 6 April 2024 | 2 | 4 → 2 | |
| Final | 4 May 2024 | 1 | 2 → 1 | |

== Qualifying rounds ==
=== Extra preliminary round ===
In the Extra Preliminary Round, 192 teams competed. The draw was announced on 7 July 2023. Eleven teams withdrew from this round resulting in 11 walkovers. The teams that withdrew in this round were Barnstaple Town, Basildon Town, Cirencester Town, Concord Rangers, Guildford City, Hanwell Town, Kidlington, Lingfield, Little Oakley, VCD Athletic, and Wells City. Northampton ON Chenecks were ruled ineligible after their game against Daventry Town so Daventry Town moved on instead.

| Tie | Home team (tier) | Score | Away team (tier) | Att. |
|---|---|---|---|---|
Monday 14 August 2023
| 17 | Basford United (7) | 6–1 | Anstey Nomads (8) | 158 |
| 65 | Sevenoaks Town (8) | 0–3 | Cray Wanderers (7) | 118 |
| 25 | Worcester City (9) | 0–5 | Coventry Copsewood (10) | 40 |
| 60 | Erith Town (9) | 1–3 | Cray Valley Paper Mills (8) | 89 |
Match played at Cray Valley Paper Mills.
| 64 | Croydon (10) | 3–1 | Faversham Town (9) | 75 |
| 68 | Little Common (9) | 4–4 (3–2 p) | South Park (8) | 30 |
Match played at Newhaven FC.
| 69 | Eastbourne Town (9) | 2–1 | Peacehaven & Telscombe (9) | 103 |
| 73 | Chipstead (8) | 0–2 | Whitehawk (7) | 78 |
| 94 | Clevedon Town (9) | 6–1 | Longwell Green Sports (10) | 56 |
| 14 | Liversedge (10) | 0–3 | Staveley Miners Welfare (10) | 67 |
| 21 | Lutterworth Town (9) | 0–5 | Stamford AFC (7) | |
| 22 | Paget Rangers (10) | 1–3 | Lye Town (8) | 70 |
| 23 | Evesham United (8) | 0–6 | Atherstone Town (9) | 66 |
| 26 | Rugby Borough (9) | 0–3 | Stourbridge (7) | 48 |
| 30 | Northampton ON Chenecks (10) | 9–1 | Daventry Town (9) | |
Match played at Daventry Town.
| 45 | New Salamis (8) | 3–1 | Frenford (9) | 90 |
Match played at Cheshunt FC.
| 52 | Hackney Wick (10) | 2–2 (5–4 p) | Enfield Town (7) | |
Match played at Clapton FC.
| 56 | Bedfont Sports (9) | 3–3 (4–5 p) | Flackwell Heath (9) | 76 |
| 57 | Penn & Tylers Green (10) | 4–1 | Kings Langley (8) | 47 |
| 63 | Chatham Town (7) | W/O | VCD Athletic (9) | NA |
| 67 | Leatherhead (8) | 5–1 | Loxwood (9) | |
| 87 | Bashley (8) | 0–4 | Fareham Town (9) | 148 |
| 29 | Bedworth United (8) | 3–2 | Droitwich Spa (10) | 72 |
Tuesday 15 August 2023
| 36 | Ampthill Town (10) | 0–2 | Royston Town (7) | 104 |
| 28 | Chasetown (8) | 4–1 | Newcastle Town (8) | 71 |
Match played at Darlaston Town 1874 FC.
| 38 | Newmarket Town (9) | 6–1 | Woodbridge Town (9) | 102 |
| 40 | Gorleston (9) | 0–6 | Haverhill Rovers (9) | 63 |
Match played at Haverhill Rovers.
| 41 | Thetford Town (9) | 2–4 | Ipswich Wanderers (8) | 60 |
| 43 | Framlingham Town (10) | 0–17 | AFC Sudbury (7) | |
| 44 | Wroxham (8) | 9–0 | Soham Town Rangers (9) | 57 |
| 66 | Mile Oak (10) | 0–4 | Colliers Wood United (9) | |
| 76 | Horsham (7) | 5–3 | Tooting Bec (10) | |
Wednesday 16 August 2023
| 1 | Pickering Town (9) | 2–2 (4–2 p) | Newcastle Benfield (9) | |
| 10 | AFC Liverpool (9) | 4–1 | Clitheroe (8) | 97 |
| 79 | Hungerford Town (7) | 4–0 | North Leigh (8) | |
| 91 | Fairford Town (9) | 0–6 | Bridgwater United (9) | |
| 7 | Runcorn Town (10) | 0–15 | Burscough (9) | 63 |
| 20 | Coalville Town (7) | 3–1 | Birstall United (10) | 137 |
| 55 | Oxhey Jets (10) | 4–1 | Leverstock Green (9) | 60 |
| 70 | Selsey (10) | 2–2 (10–9 p) | Corinthian Casuals (8) | 97 |
| 74 | Bexhill United (9) | 3–3 (7–6 p) | East Grinstead Town (8) | 86 |
Match played at Hailsham Town FC.
| 81 | Hartley Wintney (8) | 4–1 | Fleet Town (9) | 140 |
| 16 | Kirby Muxloe (10) | 2–2 (2–4 p) | Hinckley Leicester Road (8) | 71 |
| 24 | Walsall Wood (8) | 3–3 (2–4 p) | Lichfield City (9) | 63 |
| 27 | Stafford Rangers (7) | 2–1 | Coton Green (10) | 91 |
| 31 | Hitchin Town (7) | 2–1 | Arlesey Town (9) | 149 |

| Tie | Home team (tier) | Score | Away team (tier) | Att. |
|---|---|---|---|---|
| 42 | Lowestoft Town (8) | 2–3 | Sheringham (9) | 151 |
| 59 | Northwood (8) | 2–5 | Tring Athletic (9) | 71 |
| 85 | United Services Portsmouth (9) | 2–1 | Bournemouth (9) | 34 |
Thursday 17 August 2023
| 3 | Sunderland RCA (9) | 1–6 | Consett AFC (8) | 116 |
| 33 | Milton Keynes Irish (9) | 0–9 | Shefford Town & Campton (10) | 62 |
| 53 | Sawbridgeworth Town (9) | 1–2 | West Essex (9) | |
| 61 | Punjab United (9) | 2–7 | Sutton Common Rovers (8) | 36 |
| 72 | Saltdean United (9) | 3–2 | Badshot Lea (8) | |
| 88 | Bradford Town (10) | 1–3 | Bristol Manor Farm (8) | 57 |
| 89 | Bishop Sutton (10) | 0–7 | Swindon Supermarine (7) | |
| 93 | Cheddar (10) | 3–11 | Hengrove Athletic (10) | 80 |
| 62 | Sutton Athletic (9) | 0–3 | Erith & Belvedere (8) | |
| 2 | Shildon AFC (9) | 1–4 | Billingham Town (10) | 68 |
| 5 | Congleton Town (9) | 2–3 | Trafford (8) | 84 |
| 6 | Nantwich Town (8) | 3–1 | West Didsbury & Chorlton (9) | |
Match played at West Didsbury & Chorlton.
| 11 | Atherton Laburnum Rovers (10) | 1–4 | Hyde United (7) | 95 |
| 15 | Lutterworth Athletic (10) | 3–4 | Grantham Town (8) | 115 |
Match played at Grantham Town FC.
| 19 | Leicester Nirvana (9) | 2–1 | GNG Oadby Town (9) | |
| 47 | Grays Athletic (8) | 0–3 | Enfield Borough (10) | |
Match played at Aveley FC.
| 82 | Risborough Rangers (9) | 1–6 | Winslow United (10) | 60 |
| 95 | Cinderford Town (9) | 0–6 | Slimbridge (9) | 50 |
| 96 | Barnstaple Town (9) | W/O | Tiverton Town (7) | NA |
| 4 | Stockton Town (8) | 6–0 | Penrith (9) | 121 |
| 18 | Long Eaton United (7) | 6–2 | Quorn (9) | 75 |
| 32 | Rothwell Corinthians (10) | 2–3 | Corby Town (8) | 40 |
| 34 | Dunstable Town (9) | 3–2 | Moulton (10) | 117 |
| 35 | Wellingborough Whitworth (10) | 5–0 | Eynesbury Rovers (9) | 55 |
| 37 | Buckingham Athletic (10) | 1–4 | AFC Rushden & Diamonds (8) | 69 |
| 39 | Diss Town (10) | 1–1 (5–6 p) | Cornard United (10) | 79 |
| 46 | St. Margaretsbury (10) | 1–1 (4–5 p) | Ilford (9) | 128 |
| 48 | Takeley (9) | 2–1 | Cockfosters (9) | |
| 50 | Hornchurch (7) | 1–1 (2–4 p) | Brentwood Town (8) | 144 |
| 71 | Arundel (10) | 2–2 (3–4 p) | Carshalton Athletic (7) | |
| 78 | Wantage Town (9) | 0–9 | Bracknell Town (7) | 100 |
| 80 | Kidlington (8) | W/O | Thatcham Town (8) | NA |
| 84 | Alton (9) | 1–1 (4–2 p) | Winchester City (7) | |
| 86 | Millbrook (10) | 4–1 | Lymington Town (9) | 73 |
Friday 18 August 2023
| 8 | Glossop North End (9) | 1–5 | City of Liverpool (8) | 143 |
| 49 | London Lions (9) | W/O | Little Oakley (9) | NA |
| 51 | FC Clacton (9) | W/O | Concord Rangers (7) | NA |
| 54 | Basildon United (8) | W/O | Holland (10) | NA |
| 58 | Hanwell Town (7) | W/O | Hilltop (9) | NA |
| 75 | Lingfield (9) | W/O | Horsham YMCA (9) | NA |
| 77 | Guildford City (9) | W/O | Bognor Regis Town (7) | NA |
Match played at Sheerwater FC.
| 90 | Cirencester Town (8) | W/O | Newent Town (10) | NA |
| 92 | Wells City (10) | W/O | Welton Rovers (9) | NA |
| 9 | Marine (7) | 4–2 | Vauxhall Motors (8) | 198 |
| 12 | Emley AFC (9) | 20–0 | Dronfield Town (10) | 120 |
| 13 | Handsworth (9) | 4–1 | Eccleshill United (9) | |
| 83 | Christchurch (9) | 3–4 | AFC Stoneham (9) | |
Match played at AFC Stoneham.

=== Preliminary round ===
In this round of the competition, 378 teams competed, with the 96 winners from the previous round joining 282 new teams entering the competition in this phase. Sixteen teams—AFC Aldermaston, Boro Rangers, Cleethorpes Town, Coventry United, Dunkirk, East Thurrock United, Godalming Town, Harrogate Railway Athletic, Horndean, Lower Breck, Newent Town, North Greenford United, Norwich United, Seaham Red Star, Southend Manor, and Torrington—withdrew from the tournament at this phase, resulting in 16 walkovers. Brentwood Town was rewarded a tie as Cheshunt was removed from the tournament. The draw was announced on 7 July 2023.

| Tie | Home team (tier) | Score | Away team (tier) | Att. |
|---|---|---|---|---|
Friday 1 September 2023
| 99 | Bowers & Pitsea (8) | 4–1 | Haringey Borough (7) | |
Monday 4 September 2023
| 1 | Boro Rangers (9) | W/O | Chester-le-Street United (10) | NA |
| 5 | Workington AFC (7) | W/O | Seaham Red Star (9) | NA |
| 14 | Stalybridge Celtic (8) | W/O | Lower Breck (9) | NA |
| 21 | Pontefract Collieries (8) | 2–0 | Goole AFC (9) | |
| 105 | North Greenford United (9) | W/O | Harefield United (9) | NA |
| 122 | Welling Town (9) | 5–2 | Lewisham Borough (Community) (10) | |
| 129 | Horsham (7) | W/O | Godalming Town (10) | NA |
| 141 | Carshalton Athletic (7) | 1–2 | Jersey Bulls (9) | 50 |
| 154 | AFC Aldermaston (10) | W/O | Ascot United (8) | NA |
| 170 | Horndean (8) | W/O | Moneyfields (9) | NA |
| 174 | Newent Town (10) | W/O | Swindon Supermarine (7) | NA |
| 175 | Mangotsfield United (9) | 2–0 | Bristol Manor Farm (8) | 105 |
| 188 | Falmouth Town (9) | W/O | Torrington (10) | NA |
| 22 | Emley AFC (9) | 3–3 (6–7 p) | Penistone Church (9) | 174 |
| 40 | Basford United (7) | 3–1 | Gresley Rovers (8) | 170 |
| 112 | Burnham (9) | 1–3 | Uxbridge (8) | 81 |
| 117 | Rusthall (9) | 5–2 | Chatham Town (7) | 83 |
| 147 | Horsham YMCA (9) | 6–1 | Bexhill United (8) | |
| 162 | Andover New Street (9) | 0–5 | Fareham Town (9) | 128 |
| 173 | Clevedon Town (9) | 5–3 | Welton Rovers (9) | 75 |
| 181 | Cribbs (8) | 5–1 | Lydney Town (9) | 87 |
| 189 | Helston Athletic (9) | 1–0 | AFC St Austell (10) | 75 |
| 31 | Mickleover (7) | 8–0 | Leicester Nirvana (9) | |
| 43 | Malvern Town (8) | 1–3 | AFC Telford United (7) | 106 |
| 45 | Hereford Pegasus (9) | 3–2 | Stafford Rangers (7) | 75 |
| 46 | Tividale (9) | 5–1 | Wolverhampton Casuals (9) | 55 |
| 48 | Coventry United (9) | W/O | Halesowen Town (7) | NA |
| 51 | Bilston Town Community (10) | 4–1 | Stratford Town (7) | |
| 53 | Leek Town (8) | 1–1 (4–2 p) | Alvechurch (7) | 108 |
| 54 | Sutton Coldfield Town (8) | 2–0 | Lye Town (8) | 108 |
| 55 | Lichfield City (9) | 1–5 | Stourbridge (7) | 98 |
| 63 | St Neots Town (9) | 1–1 (2–4 p) | Bugbrooke St Michaels (9) | 82 |
| 71 | Haverhill Borough (10) | W/O | Norwich United (9) | NA |
| 81 | Bury Town (8) | 3–0 | Ipswich Wanderers (8) | 67 |
| 82 | Cambridge City (8) | 2–1 | Stowmarket Town (8) | 35 |
Match played at Huntingdon Town FC.
| 88 | Colney Heath (9) | 3–0 | Heybridge Swifts (8) | |
| 92 | Hashtag United (7) | 1–3 | Billericay Town (7) | 201 |
| 109 | Hillingdon Borough (10) | 0–1 | Edgware & Kingsbury (9) | |
| 110 | Berkhamsted (7) | 2–1 | Hayes & Yeading United (7) | |
| 113 | Penn & Tylers Green (10) | 0–6 | Tring Athletic (9) | 27 |
| 115 | Herne Bay (8) | 3–3 (3–2 p) | AFC Croydon Athletic (9) | 86 |
| 135 | Three Bridges (8) | 7–0 | Seaford Town (10) | 48 |
| 145 | Walton & Hersham (7) | 2–0 | Bognor Regis Town (7) | |
| 148 | Kingstonian (7) | 2–1 | Metropolitan Police (8) | 72 |
| 149 | Westside (10) | 0–1 | Eastbourne Town (9) | 24 |
| 152 | Wokingham & Emmbrook (9) | 0–1 | Basingstoke Town (7) | 110 |
| 160 | Thatcham Town (8) | 2–1 | Aylesbury Vale Dynamos (9) | |
| 172 | Odd Down (10) | 0–7 | Hartpury University (10) | 50 |
| 47 | Bedworth United (8) | 2–2 (3–2 p) | Atherstone Town (9) | 208 |
Tuesday 5 September 2023
| 16 | Sandbach United (10) | 1–1 (3–1 p) | Witton Albion (8) | |
| 137 | Roffey (10) | 2–2 (2–4 p) | Westfield (8) | 155 |
| 140 | Lancing (8) | 3–1 | Billingshurst (10) | |
| 114 | Glebe (9) | 2–4 | Corinthian (9) | |
| 158 | Ardley United (9) | 1–5 | Didcot Town (7) | |
| 3 | Stockton Town (8) | 7–0 | Pickering Town (9) | 136 |
| 10 | Lancaster City (7) | 3–0 | Trafford (8) | 116 |
| 56 | Boldmere St Michaels (8) | 2–0 | Romulus (9) | 87 |
| 67 | Harpenden Town (9) | A–A | Bedford Town (8) | |
Match was abandoned at the 25th minute due to an injury with Harpenden Town winning 1–0.
| 77 | Needham Market (7) | 0–5 | Fakenham Town (9) | 52 |
| 80 | Great Yarmouth Town (10) | 5–0 | Swaffham Town (10) | |
| 89 | Waltham Abbey (8) | 1–0 | Walthamstow (8) | 125 |
| 95 | Great Wakering Rovers (9) | 1–5 | Barking (9) | 88 |
| 123 | Hollands & Blair (9) | 1–2 | Cray Wanderers (7) | 137 |
| 125 | Whitstable Town (9) | 2–8 | Croydon (10) | |
| 126 | Broadbridge Heath (8) | 1–4 | Redhill (9) | |
| 150 | Bracknell Town (7) | 11–1 | Yateley United (10) | 136 |
| 165 | Hamworthy United (8) | 1–5 | Poole Town (7) | 130 |
| 176 | Bishop's Cleeve (8) | 0–1 | Hengrove Athletic (10) | |
Wednesday 6 September 2023
| 12 | FC United of Manchester (7) | 1–0 | Ashton Town (10) | 230 |
| 118 | Phoenix Sports (8) | 2–4 | Sutton Common Rovers (8) | 62 |
| 131 | Wick (10) | 6–3 | East Preston (10) | |
| 182 | Thornbury Town (9) | 1–12 | Bridgwater United (9) | 51 |
| 168 | Downton (10) | 1–2 | Salisbury (7) | |
| 19 | Cheadle Town (9) | 4–2 | Pilkington (9) | 93 |
| 86 | Ilford (9) | 2–2 (6–5 p) | Halstead Town (9) | |
| 91 | Buckhurst Hill (9) | 0–3 | Hertford Town (8) | |
| 104 | Brook House (10) | 1–8 | Beaconsfield Town (7) | |
| 106 | Oxhey Jets (10) | 9–2 | Hilltop (9) | 24 |
| 120 | Beckenham Town (8) | 1–3 | Sheppey United (8) | |
| 156 | Hartley Wintney (8) | 2–4 | Binfield (8) | 100 |
| 159 | Eversley & California (10) | 2–1 | Tadley Calleva (9) | |
| 164 | Bemerton Heath Harlequins (8) | 6–3 | Brockenhurst (9) | |
| 171 | United Services Portsmouth (9) | 1–3 | Portland United (9) | 71 |
| 183 | Slimbridge (9) | 1–5 | Street (9) | 118 |
| 6 | Carlisle City (9) | 0–2 | Consett AFC (8) | 65 |
| 7 | Bootle (8) | 2–1 | Stockport Georgians (10) | |
| 13 | South Liverpool (10) | 9–1 | Runcorn Linnets (8) | 64 |
| 23 | Grimsby Borough (8) | 1–2 | Gainsborough Trinity (7) | 75 |
| 29 | Staveley Miners Welfare (10) | 2–1 | Barton Town (9) | 130 |
| 32 | Harborough Town (8) | 0–3 | Heather St Johns (10) | 73 |
| 62 | AFC Dunstable (8) | 1–2 | Histon (9) | 65 |
| 64 | Hitchin Town (7) | 5–3 | Royston Town (7) | 108 |
| 90 | Ware (8) | 4–1 | Romford (9) | 96 |
| 93 | Brentwood Town (8) | 0–2 | Cheshunt (7) | |
| 100 | Barkingside (10) | 3–2 | Potters Bar Town (7) | |
| 116 | Sittingbourne (8) | 2–6 | Margate (7) | |
| 144 | Chichester City (8) | 5–2 | Pagham (9) | 128 |
Match played at Pagham FC.

| Tie | Home team (tier) | Score | Away team (tier) | Att. |
|---|---|---|---|---|
| 153 | Thame United (8) | 10–2 | Wallingford & Crowmarsh (9) | |
| 187 | Ilfracombe Town (9) | 3–3 (4–5 p) | Tiverton Town (7) | 84 |
| 41 | Leamington (7) | 2–2 (6–7 p) | Dudley Town (10) | |
Thursday 7 September 2023
| 4 | Guisborough Town (9) | 1–4 | Morpeth Town (7) | 87 |
| 37 | Dunkirk (10) | W/O | Eastwood Community (9) | NA |
| 132 | Lewes (7) | 3–2 | Tooting & Mitcham United (9) | 51 |
| 163 | Folland Sports (10) | 1–6 | Gosport Borough (7) | |
| 2 | Hebburn Town (8) | 1–3 | Billingham Town (10) | |
| 11 | Macclesfield (7) | 0–0 (10–9 p) | AFC Liverpool (9) | 160 |
| 18 | Cheadle Heath Nomads (10) | 0–3 | Avro (8) | 97 |
| 25 | Ossett United (8) | 4–2 | Brighouse Town (8) | 96 |
| 30 | Grantham Town (8) | 1–1 (5–4 p) | Deeping Rangers (9) | 141 |
| 57 | Letchworth Garden City Eagles (9) | 1–5 | Newport Pagnell Town (9) | 57 |
| 61 | Leighton Town (8) | 3–0 | Kettering Town (7) | |
| 70 | AFC Rushden & Diamonds (8) | 5–1 | Dunstable Town (9) | 72 |
| 98 | Wingate & Finchley (7) | W/O | East Thurrock United (8) | NA |
| 108 | Langley (10) | 9–2 | Hendon (7) | 42 |
| 136 | Selsey (10) | 2–1 | Haywards Heath Town (9) | 130 |
| 142 | Little Common (9) | 5–2 | Colliers Wood United (9) | 75 |
| 143 | Shoreham (9) | 1–1 (3–4 p) | Worthing United (10) | |
| 146 | Crawley Down Gatwick (9) | 3–2 | Raynes Park Vale (8) | 78 |
| 169 | Sholing (7) | 6–1 | AFC Totton (7) | |
| 177 | Malmesbury Victoria (10) | 4–0 | Frome Town (8) | |
| 179 | Hallen (10) | 3–2 | Paulton Rovers (8) | 68 |
| 180 | Royal Wootton Bassett Town (9) | 1–2 | Tuffley Rovers (9) | 74 |
| 184 | AEK Boco (10) | 3–1 | Portishead Town (10) | |
Match played at Portishead Town FC.
| 185 | Bovey Tracey (10) | 3–2 | Bishops Lydeard (10) | |
| 186 | Mousehole AFC (8) | 4–3 | Elburton Villa (10) | 53 |
| 15 | Irlam (9) | A–A | Wythenshawe (9) | |
Match was abandoned due to an injury from a Wythenshawe player.
| 26 | Worsbrough Bridge Athletic (10) | 0–4 | Guiseley (7) | |
| 33 | Lincoln United (9) | 1–1 (3–4 p) | Aylestone Park (9) | 146 |
| 34 | Coalville Town (7) | 1–3 | Stamford AFC (7) | 65 |
| 36 | Long Eaton United (7) | 7–0 | Ilkeston Town (7) | |
| 38 | Holbeach United (10) | 1–3 | Matlock Town (7) | |
| 39 | Ingles (10) | 4–1 | Leicester St Andrews (10) | 50 |
| 44 | Rugby Town (8) | 0–2 | Shifnal Town (9) | 82 |
| 49 | Coventry Sphinx (8) | 5–2 | Stourport Swifts (9) | 78 |
| 50 | Chasetown (8) | 3–1 | Coventry Copsewood (10) | 63 |
Match played at Darlaston Town 1874 FC.
| 52 | AFC Wulfrunians (9) | 2–1 | Nuneaton Borough (7) | 93 |
| 58 | Shefford Town & Campton (10) | 4–1 | Godmanchester Rovers (9) | |
| 59 | Baldock Town (9) | 2–2 (7–8 p) | Kempston Rovers (8) | 74 |
| 60 | Stotfold (8) | 5–1 | St Ives Town (7) | 47 |
| 65 | Biggleswade Town (8) | 0–3 | Crawley Green (9) | |
| 66 | March Town United (9) | 2–6 | Corby Town (8) | |
| 68 | Daventry Town (9) | 2–1 | Raunds Town (10) | |
| 69 | Wellingborough Town (9) | 0–10 | Wellingborough Whitworth (10) | |
| 72 | Wroxham (8) | 1–2 | Sheringham (9) | |
| 73 | Haverhill Rovers (10) | 0–0 (5–4 p) | Cornard United (10) | 102 |
| 74 | Brantham Athletic (9) | A–A | Newmarket Town (9) | |
Match Abandoned.
| 75 | Dereham Town (9) | 0–5 | AFC Sudbury (7) | |
| 76 | Walsham Le Willows (9) | 2–1 | Hadleigh United (9) | 45 |
| 78 | Mulbarton Wanderers (9) | 0–11 | Leiston (7) | |
| 79 | Whitton United (10) | 4–3 | Felixstowe & Walton United (8) | 61 |
| 83 | Ely City (9) | 3–0 | Mildenhall Town (9) | |
| 85 | FC Clacton (9) | 3–2 | Witham Town (8) | 127 |
| 94 | Welwyn Garden City (8) | 3–3 (4–5 p) | May & Baker Eastbrook Community (10) | |
| 97 | Takeley (9) | 5–2 | London Lions (9) | |
| 101 | West Essex (9) | 2–2 (6–5 p) | Woodford Town (9) | 103 |
| 107 | Holmer Green (10) | 2–1 | Chalfont St Peter AFC (9) | |
| 111 | Flackwell Heath (9) | 7–2 | Wembley (9) | 115 |
| 119 | Folkestone Invicta (7) | 1–4 | Cray Valley Paper Mills (8) | 182 |
| 121 | Balham (9) | 0–9 | Erith & Belvedere (8) | |
| 124 | Larkfield & New Hythe Wanderers (10) | 2–1 | Ashford United (8) | 59 |
| 127 | Chessington & Hook United (10) | 2–1 | Saltdean United (9) | 101 |
| 130 | Farnham Town (9) | 3–5 | Newhaven (9) | |
| 134 | Leatherhead (8) | 5–1 | Ash United (10) | |
| 138 | Eastbourne United AFC (9) | 3–3 (4–2 p) | Whitehawk (7) | |
| 155 | Cove (10) | 1–5 | Hungerford Town (7) | |
| 157 | Camberley Town (9) | 2–1 | Frimley Green (10) | 95 |
| 166 | Hamble Club (9) | 2–2 (5–4 p) | Alton (9) | |
| 167 | Millbrook (10) | 4–4 (4–5 p) | Wimborne Town (8) | |
| 178 | Radstock Town (10) | A–A | Cheltenham Saracens (10) | |
Match Abandoned due to floodlight failure. Radstock Town was winning 2–1.
| 9 | Burscough (9) | 4–3 | Nantwich Town (8) | 64 |
Friday 8 September 2023
| 24 | Stocksbridge Park Steels (8) | W/O | Harrogate Railway Athletic (10) | |
| 28 | Cleethorpes Town (8) | W/O | Tadcaster Albion (9) | |
| 96 | Saffron Walden Town (9) | W/O | Southend Manor (10) | |
| 8 | Hyde United (7) | 3–3 (5–4 p) | Marine (7) | |
| 17 | Radcliffe (7) | 6–2 | City of Liverpool (8) | |
| 20 | Bradford (Park Avenue) (7) | 3–0 | Bottesford Town (9) | 163 |
| 27 | Handsworth (9) | 1–1 (4–5 p) | Yorkshire Amateur (10) | |
| 35 | Hinckley AFC (10) | 6–0 | Hinckley Leicester Road (8) | 81 |
Match played at Rugby Borough FC.
| 42 | Redditch United (7) | 3–1 | Racing Club Warwick (9) | |
| 84 | Stanway Rovers (9) | 2–1 | Redbridge (8) | |
| 102 | New Salamis (8) | 4–0 | Holland (10) | |
| 128 | Steyning Town Community (9) | 0–7 | Burgess Hill Town (8) | |
| 133 | Cobham (9) | 4–0 | Hastings United (7) | |
| 151 | Reading City (9) | 8–0 | Winslow United (10) | 78 |
| 161 | AFC Stoneham (9) | 4–2 | New Milton Town (10) | |
Sunday 10 September 2023
| 139 | AFC Varndeanians (9) | 1–5 | Abbey Rangers (9) | |
| 103 | Hullbridge Sports (9) | 2–3 | Enfield Borough (10) | |
| 87 | Hackney Wick (10) | 1–1 (6–5 p) | Burnham Ramblers (10) | |
Thursday 14 September 2023
| 15 | Irlam (9) | 2–4 | Wythenshawe (9) | 101 |
| 74 | Brantham Athletic (9) | 4–0 | Newmarket Town (9) | |
| 178 | Radstock Town (10) | 1–5 | Cheltenham Saracens (10) | |

=== First Round Qualifying ===
Forty-three clubs from the sixth tier leagues National League North and the National League South joined the 189 winners from the previous round with Farnborough, Peterborough Sports, Taunton Town, Warrington Town, and Weymouth not joining because they did not apply. This is the first time the clubs from the sixth tier did not join the other clubs in the preliminary rounds. Two clubs Braintree Town and Scunthorpe United withdrew from the competition at this stage. The Draw was made on 25 August 2023.

| Tie | Home team (tier) | Score | Away team (tier) | Att. |
|---|---|---|---|---|
Monday 18 September 2023
| 3 | Darlington (6) | 0–6 | South Shields (6) | |
Match was played at Northallerton Town FC.
| 19 | Scunthorpe United (6) | W/O | Staveley Miners Welfare (10) | NA |
| 37 | Bilston Town Community (10) | 1–3 | Redditch United (7) | |
| 86 | Westfield (8) | 1–1 (4–3 p) | Newhaven (9) | |
| 21 | Pontefract Collieries (8) | 2–0 | Ossett United (8) | 177 |
| 40 | AFC Rushden & Diamonds (8) | 2–0 | Harpenden Town (9) | 87 |
| 43 | Kempston Rovers (8) | P–P | Hitchin Town (7) | |
| 85 | Little Common (9) | 2–2 (5–4 p) | Horsham (7) | 102 |
| 96 | Thame United (8) | 5–1 | Eversley & California (10) | |
| 103 | Fareham Town (9) | 4–1 | Moneyfields (9) | 156 |
| 12 | Lancaster City (7) | 6–0 | Buxton (6) | |
| 22 | Mickleover (7) | 7–0 | Alfreton Town (6) | |
| 27 | Stamford AFC (7) | 3–0 | Grantham Town (8) | |
| 32 | Dudley Town (10) | 2–3 | Tividale (9) | |
| 36 | Stourbridge (7) | 6–2 | Leek Town (8) | |
| 45 | Haverhill Borough (10) | 1–8 | AFC Sudbury (7) | |
| 62 | Barking (9) | 3–0 | Billericay Town (7) | 187 |
| 74 | Herne Bay (8) | 2–5 | Sheppey United (8) | 94 |
| 75 | Welling Town (9) | 0–1 | Tonbridge Angels (6) | |
| 87 | Three Bridges (8) | 1–2 | Crawley Down Gatwick (9) | |
| 89 | Eastbourne Town (9) | 2–4 | Cobham (9) | 124 |
| 33 | Bedworth United (8) | 3–2 | Hereford Pegasus (9) | |
Tuesday 19 September 2023
| 114 | Yeovil Town (6) | 0–3 | Helston Athletic (9) | 197 |
| 90 | Jersey Bulls (9) | 4–1 | Eastbourne United AFC (9) | 64 |
Match was played at Littlehampton Town FC.
| 2 | Billingham Town (10) | P–P | Spennymoor Town (6) | |
| 4 | Consett AFC (8) | 0–0 (2–4 p) | Chester-Le-Street United (10) | 76 |
| 60 | Aveley (6) | 1–4 | New Salamis (8) | |
| 65 | Harefield United (9) | 4–4 (2–3 p) | Slough Town (6) | |
| 82 | Lancing (8) | 7–0 | Redhill (9) | 80 |
| 7 | Curzon Ashton (6) | P–P | Radcliffe (7) | |
| 13 | Sandbach United (10) | 0–1 | Bootle (8) | |
| 28 | Boldmere St Michaels (8) | 2–0 | Rushall Olympic (6) | 55 |
| 48 | Bury Town (8) | 3–1 | Whitton United (10) | 56 |
| 56 | West Essex (9) | 0–2 | Wingate & Finchley (7) | |
| 59 | Waltham Abbey (8) | 0–5 | Barkingside (10) | 172 |
| 61 | Enfield Borough (10) | 1–1 (5–4 p) | Hackney Wick (10) | |
Match was played at London Lions.
| 69 | Ascot United (8) | 1–3 | Flackwell Heath (9) | 105 |
| 76 | Maidstone United (6) | 5–1 | Dartford (6) | 265 |
| 83 | Worthing United (10) | 12–1 | Wick (10) | |
| 91 | Worthing (6) | 4–2 | Eastbourne Borough (6) | 68 |
| 95 | Basingstoke Town (7) | 3–2 | Frimley Green (10) | |
| 105 | Bath City (6) | 0–1 | Weston Super Mare (6) | |
Wednesday 20 September 2023
| 1 | Blyth Spartans (6) | 2–1 | Stockton Town (8) | 129 |
| 72 | Welling United (6) | 7–0 | Larkfield & New Hythe Wanderers (10) | |
| 98 | Hungerford Town (7) | P–P | Bracknell Town (7) | |
| 8 | FC United of Manchester (7) | 1–3 | Avro (8) | 330 |
| 11 | Chorley (6) | 1–7 | Chester (6) | |
| 30 | Banbury United (6) | 0–2 | Sutton Coldfield Town (8) | 108 |
| 31 | AFC Telford United (7) | P–P | Hereford (6) | |
| 54 | May & Baker Eastbrook Community (10) | 1–1 (4–2 p) | Bishop's Stortford (6) | |
Match was played at Bishop's Stortford FC.
| 58 | Hertford Town (8) | 5–0 | FC Clacton (9) | |
| 63 | Chelmsford City (6) | W/O | Braintree Town (6) | NA |
| 67 | Oxhey Jets (10) | 1–2 | Berkhamsted (7) | 52 |
| 71 | Sutton Common Rovers (8) | 6–4 | Lewes (7) | |
| 88 | Hampton & Richmond Borough (6) | P–P | Kingstonian (7) | |
| 100 | Salisbury (7) | P–P | AFC Stoneham (9) | |
| 106 | Tuffley Rovers (9) | 1–7 | Street (9) | 61 |
| 112 | AEK Boco (10) | P–P | Clevedon Town (9) | |
| 17 | Basford United (7) | 1–0 | Yorkshire Amateur (10) | 75 |
| 20 | Farsley Celtic (6) | 6–0 | Stocksbridge Park Steels (8) | |
| 24 | Heather St Johns (10) | 3–3 (4–2 p) | Long Eaton United (7) | 136 |
| 26 | Boston United (6) | 0–3 | Eastwood Community (9) | 222 |
| 64 | Ware (8) | 1–0 | Bowers & Pitsea (8) | 71 |
| 66 | Edgware & Kingsbury (9) | 0–1 | Tring Athletic (9) | |
| 97 | Chippenham Town (6) | 2–0 | Didcot Town (7) | 57 |
| 101 | Poole Town (7) | P–P | Sholing (7) | |

| Tie | Home team (tier) | Score | Away team (tier) | Att. |
|---|---|---|---|---|
Thursday 21 September 2023
| 109 | Cribbs (8) | 1–6 | Bridgwater United (9) | |
| 110 | Hengrove Athletic (10) | 0–4 | Mangotsfield United (9) | 90 |
| 113 | Bovey Tracey (10) | 1–6 | Torquay United (6) | 84 |
| 10 | Wythenshawe (9) | 3–2 | Southport (6) | 191 |
| 44 | Leighton Town (8) | 7–0 | Crawley Green (9) | |
| 52 | Colney Heath (9) | 1–1 (4–5 p) | St Albans City (6) | |
| 70 | Langley (10) | A–A | Beaconsfield Town (7) | |
Match was played at Brunel University Sports Park.
Match was abandoned before kickoff due to a floodlight issue.
| 78 | Cray Wanderers (7) | 2–1 | Corinthian (9) | 76 |
Match was played at Corinthian FC.
| 84 | Horsham YMCA (9) | 0–5 | Chichester City (8) | 51 |
| 92 | Selsey (10) | 1–3 | Walton & Hersham (7) | 152 |
| 104 | Wimborne Town (8) | 4–1 | Gosport Borough (7) | |
| 108 | Swindon Supermarine (7) | 6–1 | Malmesbury Victoria (10) | 105 |
| 111 | Hallen (10) | 0–8 | Hartpury University (10) | 58 |
| 115 | Mousehole AFC (8) | 0–6 | Falmouth Town (9) | 81 |
| 7 | Curzon Ashton (6) | 3–1 | Radcliffe (7) | 165 |
| 14 | Stalybridge Celtic (8) | 1–5 | Burscough (9) | 94 |
| 18 | Tadcaster Albion (9) | 0–10 | Guiseley (7) | 116 |
| 25 | Aylestone Park (9) | 6–1 | Matlock Town (7) | 85 |
| 29 | Shifnal Town (9) | 0–5 | Chasetown (8) | |
| 35 | Coventry Sphinx (8) | 0–6 | AFC Wulfrunians (9) | |
| 38 | Shefford Town & Campton (10) | 6–0 | Histon (9) | |
| 39 | Stotfold (8) | 2–3 | Bugbrooke St Michaels (9) | 89 |
| 41 | Daventry Town (9) | 2–3 | Corby Town (8) | |
| 42 | Newport Pagnell Town (9) | 4–1 | Wellingborough Whitworth (10) | 140 |
| 46 | Haverhill Rovers (10) | 3–0 | Walsham Le Willows (9) | 71 |
| 47 | Ely City (9) | 1–3 | Great Yarmouth Town (10) | |
| 49 | King's Lynn Town (6) | 6–0 | Cambridge City (8) | 109 |
| 50 | Sheringham (9) | 2–2 (4–5 p) | Fakenham Town (9) | 100 |
| 51 | Brantham Athletic (9) | 1–2 | Leiston (7) | |
| 55 | Takeley (9) | 1–0 | Ilford (9) | |
| 57 | Saffron Walden Town (9) | 1–6 | Stanway Rovers (9) | 73 |
| 68 | Holmer Green (10) | 4–4 (3–5 p) | Uxbridge (8) | |
| 73 | Cray Valley Paper Mills (8) | 0–0 (8–9 p) | Croydon (10) | 84 |
| 77 | Rusthall (9) | 2–1 | Dover Athletic (6) | 108 |
| 80 | Leatherhead (8) | P–P | Burgess Hill Town (8) | |
| 81 | Chessington & Hook United (10) | 1–5 | Abbey Rangers (9) | |
| 93 | Reading City (9) | 5–0 | Brackley Town (6) | |
| 94 | Binfield (8) | 3–3 (1–3 p) | Thatcham Town (8) | |
| 99 | Bemerton Heath Harlequins (8) | 0–7 | Havant & Waterlooville (6) | |
| 102 | Hamble Club (9) | 6–2 | Portland United (9) | |
| 116 | Truro City (6) | 2–1 | Tiverton Town (7) | 70 |
Friday 22 September 2023
| 6 | Macclesfield (7) | 5–1 | Cheadle Town (9) | 139 |
| 5 | Morpeth Town (7) | 1–1 (2–4 p) | Workington (7) | 36 |
| 9 | Hyde United (7) | 5–1 | South Liverpool (10) | 159 |
| 16 | Bradford (Park Avenue) (7) | 0–4 | Gainsborough Trinity (7) | 171 |
| 23 | Hinckley AFC (10) | 2–3 | Ingles (10) | 39 |
Match was played at Rugby Borough FC.
| 79 | Erith & Belvedere (8) | 2–1 | Margate (7) | |
| 107 | Cheltenham Saracens (10) | 6–0 | Gloucester City (6) | |
| 34 | Tamworth (6) | 2–0 | Halesowen Town (7) | 201 |
| 53 | Hemel Hempstead Town (6) | 5–1 | Brentwood Town (8) | 515 |
Sunday 24 September 2023
| 15 | Scarborough Athletic (6) | 6–4 | Penistone Church (9) | |
Monday 25 September 2023
| 43 | Kempston Rovers (8) | 2–4 | Hitchin Town (7) | 248 |
| 88 | Hampton & Richmond Borough (6) | 1–2 | Kingstonian (7) | 127 |
| 100 | Salisbury (7) | 0–3 | AFC Stoneham (9) | |
Tuesday 26 September 2023
| 2 | Billingham Town (10) | 0–3 | Spennymoor Town (6) | |
| 31 | AFC Telford United (7) | 1–2 | Hereford (6) | |
Wednesday 27 September 2023
| 98 | Hungerford Town (7) | 3–2 | Bracknell Town (7) | |
| 98 | Langley (10) | 0–1 | Beaconsfield Town (7) | 60 |
Match was played at North Greenford United.
| 101 | Poole Town (7) | 4–1 | Sholing (7) | 81 |
Thursday 28 September 2023
| 112 | AEK Boco (10) | 1–4 | Clevedon Town (9) | |
| 80 | Leatherhead (8) | 1–2 | Burgess Hill Town (8) | |

=== Second Round Qualifying ===
Twenty-four teams from the Fifth Tier National League joined the 116 winners from the previous round in the Second Round of the qualifying. Twenty-two teams from the lowest tier, the Tenth Tier, remain in the competition. The Draw was made on 22 September 2023.

| Tie | Home team (tier) | Score | Away team (tier) | Att. |
|---|---|---|---|---|
Monday 2 October 2023
| 3 | Hartlepool United (5) | 5–1 | Blyth Spartans (6) | 301 |
| 57 | Westfield (8) | 0–7 | Jersey Bulls (9) | |
| 58 | Swindon Supermarine (7) | 0–3 | Oxford City (5) | 96 |
| 12 | Pontefract Collieries (8) | 5–0 | Scarborough Athletic (6) | |
| 67 | Weston Super Mare (6) | 3–1 | Cheltenham Saracens (10) | 110 |
| 23 | AFC Wulfrunians (9) | 1–3 | Stourbridge (7) | |
| 24 | Tividale (9) | 1–0 | Sutton Coldfield Town (8) | |
| 44 | Berkhamsted (7) | P–P | Slough Town (6) | |
| 46 | Tonbridge Angels (6) | 3–0 | Bromley (5) | 158 |
| 52 | Abbey Rangers (9) | 1–12 | Worthing (6) | 60 |
| 53 | Kingstonian (7) | 5–0 | Lancing (8) | 72 |
Match played at South Park Reigate FC.
| 54 | Walton & Hersham (7) | 6–1 | Worthing United (10) | |
| 59 | Thatcham Town (8) | 0–3 | Reading City (9) | |
| 21 | Bedworth United (8) | 3–3 (5–4 p) | Tamworth (6) | |
| 65 | Chippenham Town (6) | 0–2 | Mangotsfield United (9) | |
Tuesday 3 October 2023
| 2 | Spennymoor Town (6) | 2–4 | Chester-Le-Street United (10) | 138 |
| 11 | Avro (8) | 3–4 | Lancaster City (7) | |
| 43 | Beaconsfield Town (7) | 2–3 | Thame United (8) | |
| 45 | Sutton Common Rovers (8) | 1–1 (1–3 p) | Croydon (10) | 46 |
| 55 | Burgess Hill Town (8) | 2–2 (5–3 p) | Woking (5) | 105 |
| 22 | Boldmere St Michaels (8) | 3–1 | Kidderminster Harriers (5) | 68 |
| 30 | Haverhill Rovers (10) | 2–3 | Bury Town (8) | |
| 31 | Great Yarmouth Town (10) | 1–2 | Stanway Rovers (9) | |
| 49 | Erith & Belvedere (8) | 4–2 | Little Common (9) | |
| 50 | Maidstone United (6) | 5–1 | Sheppey United (8) | 255 |
| 70 | Helston Athletic (9) | 3–7 | Truro City (6) | 134 |
| 18 | Mickleover (7) | 2–1 | Stamford (7) | |
| 64 | Havant & Waterlooville (6) | 1–3 | Wimborne Town (8) | |
Wednesday 4 October 2023
| 60 | Hungerford Town (7) | 1–1 (3–4 p) | Basingstoke Town (7) | 203 |
| 66 | Bridgwater United (9) | 1–0 | Hartpury University (10) | |
| 35 | St Albans City (6) | 1–2 | Wingate & Finchley (7) | |
| 38 | Barkingside (10) | 0–3 | Chelmsford City (6) | 55 |
Match played at Frenford FC.
| 68 | Street (9) | 4–0 | Clevedon Town (9) | |
| 6 | Rochdale (5) | 9–0 | Bootle (8) | |
| 10 | Chester (6) | 1–1 (4–2 p) | Altrincham (5) | 291 |
| 14 | Farsley Celtic (6) | 3–2 | Staveley Miners Welfare (10) | 140 |
| 16 | Heather St Johns (10) | 4–1 | Eastwood Community (9) | 94 |

| Tie | Home team (tier) | Score | Away team (tier) | Att. |
|---|---|---|---|---|
| 19 | Bilston Town Community (10) | 0–3 | Chasetown (8) | |
| 20 | Hereford (6) | 1–1 (1–3 p) | Solihull Moors (5) | 205 |
| 25 | Hitchin Town (7) | 3–2 | Shefford Town & Campton (10) | 113 |
| 29 | King's Lynn Town (6) | 1–1 (2–0 p) | Leiston (7) | |
| 37 | Barking (9) | 9–1 | Dagenham & Redbridge (5) | 174 |
| 40 | Tring Athletic (9) | 3–2 | Maidenhead United (5) | 280 |
| 41 | Uxbridge (8) | 3–3 (6–5 p) | Flackwell Heath (9) | 77 |
| 61 | Aldershot Town (5) | 8–0 | Hamble Club (9) | 118 |
| 62 | Poole Town (7) | 2–2 (4–5 p) | Fareham Town (9) | 79 |
| 4 | York City (5) | 3–0 | Workington (7) | |
Match played at Garforth Town FC.
Thursday 5 October 2023
| 1 | Gateshead (5) | 2–3 | South Shields (6) | |
Match played at Hebburn Town FC.
| 15 | Chesterfield (5) | 5–0 | Aylestone Park (9) | |
Match played at Aylestone Park FC.
| 42 | Barnet (5) | 4–1 | Boreham Wood (5) | 379 |
| 69 | Torquay United (6) | 6–2 | Falmouth Town (9) | 119 |
Match played at Buckland Athletic FC.
| 7 | Wythenshawe (9) | 2–2 (4–1 p) | FC Halifax Town (5) | 221 |
| 26 | AFC Rushden & Diamonds (8) | 1–1 (2–4 p) | Bugbrooke St Michaels (9) | 164 |
| 39 | Leighton Town (8) | 2–0 | Wealdstone (5) | 100 |
| 47 | Rusthall (9) | 6–3 | Cray Wanderers (7) | |
| 48 | Welling United (6) | 3–0 | Ebbsfleet United (5) | |
| 51 | Crawley Down Gatwick (9) | 7–2 | Chichester City (8) | 162 |
| 63 | Eastleigh (5) | 4–2 | AFC Stoneham (9) | |
| 27 | Newport Pagnell Town (9) | 4–1 | Corby Town (8) | 201 |
| 34 | Enfield Borough (10) | 0–2 | Takeley (9) | |
Match played at London Lions FC.
| 28 | AFC Sudbury (7) | 6–1 | Fakenham Town (9) | 94 |
Friday 6 October 2023
| 5 | Hyde United (7) | 2–3 | Curzon Ashton (6) | 310 |
| 8 | Burscough (9) | 3–0 | Macclesfield (7) | 173 |
| 17 | Basford United (7) | 2–3 | Ingles (10) | 156 |
| 56 | Cobham (9) | 1–2 | Dorking Wanderers (5) | |
| 13 | Guiseley (7) | 7–0 | Gainsborough Trinity (7) | 210 |
| 32 | New Salamis (8) | 3–1 | Hertford Town (8) | |
| 33 | May & Baker Eastbrook Community (10) | 0–6 | Ware (8) | |
| 36 | Hemel Hempstead Town (6) | 4–0 | Southend United (5) | 527 |
Sunday 8 October 2023
| 9 | Oldham Athletic (5) | 1–2 | AFC Fylde (5) | 288 |
Monday 9 October 2023
| 44 | Berkhamsted (7) | 3–2 | Slough Town (6) | 116 |

=== Third Round Qualifying ===
The 70 winners from the Second Round Qualifying compete in this round with the 35 winners progressing to the First Round Proper. Chester-Le-Street United, Croydon, Heather St Johns, and Ingles from the 10th tier were the lowest ranked teams left in the competition. The Draw for the round was made on 6 October 2023.

| Tie | Home team (tier) | Score | Away team (tier) | Att. |
|---|---|---|---|---|
Monday 16 October 2023
| 33 | Truro City (6) | 3–8 | Eastleigh (5) | 135 |
Match was played at Godolphin Atlantic FC.
| 3 | Chester-Le-Street United (10) | 1–1 (4–3 p) | Pontefract Collieries (8) | |
| 29 | Thame United (8) | 4–0 | Basingstoke Town (7) | |
| 12 | Tividale (9) | 0–1 | Solihull Moors (5) | |
| 20 | New Salamis (8) | 2–3 | Takeley (9) | |
| 21 | Walton & Hersham (7) | 1–0 | Maidstone United (6) | |
| 24 | Uxbridge (8) | 0–1 | Berkhamsted (7) | 103 |
| 34 | Aldershot Town (5) | 3–0 | Weston Super Mare (6) | 94 |
Tuesday 17 October 2023
| 32 | Mangotsfield United (9) | 1–2 | Bridgwater United (9) | |
| 1 | South Shields (6) | 3–0 | York City (5) | 248 |
| 8 | Boldmere St Michaels (8) | 4–3 | Ingles (10) | 89 |
| 27 | Erith & Belvedere (8) | 3–1 | Croydon (10) | |
Wednesday 18 October 2023
| 2 | Guiseley (7) | 2–1 | Hartlepool United (5) | 270 |
| 7 | Rochdale (5) | 1–1 (4–1 p) | Burscough (9) | |
| 22 | Tring Athletic (9) | P–P | Jersey Bulls (9) | |
| 4 | AFC Fylde (5) | 2–0 | Chester (6) | |
Match was played at Kellamergh Park.
| 23 | Crawley Down Gatwick (9) | 2–6 | Worthing (6) | 129 |
| 35 | Fareham Town (9) | P–P | Wimborne Town (8) | |
| 14 | Hitchin Town (7) | 1–3 | Bury Town (8) | 90 |
| 17 | Wingate & Finchley (7) | 1–2 | Hemel Hempstead Town (6) | 48 |
| 31 | Oxford City (5) | 5–1 | Street (9) | |
| 5 | Farsley Celtic (6) | 2–1 | Wythenshawe (9) | 169 |

| Tie | Home team (tier) | Score | Away team (tier) | Att. |
|---|---|---|---|---|
Thursday 19 October 2023
| 18 | Barnet (5) | 2–3 | Ware (8) | 241 |
| 15 | Leighton Town (8) | 3–1 | King's Lynn Town (6) | 100 |
| 25 | Burgess Hill Town (8) | 5–3 | Tonbridge Angels (6) | 113 |
| 26 | Rusthall (9) | 0–1 | Kingstonian (7) | 215 |
| 28 | Welling United (6) | 1–1 (7–8 p) | Dorking Wanderers (5) | |
| 30 | Torquay United (6) | P–P | Reading City (9) | |
Match was played at Buckland Athletic FC.
| 6 | Curzon Ashton (6) | 1–9 | Lancaster City (7) | 144 |
| 9 | Bugbrooke St Michaels (9) | 3–4 | Stourbridge (7) | 96 |
| 10 | Newport Pagnell Town (9) | 1–3 | Chasetown (8) | 246 |
| 13 | Mickleover (7) | 6–1 | Bedworth United (8) | |
| 16 | AFC Sudbury (7) | 3–3 (5–4 p) | Chelmsford City (6) | 106 |
Friday 20 October 2023
| 11 | Heather St Johns (10) | P–P | Chesterfield (5) | |
| 19 | Stanway Rovers (9) | P–P | Barking (9) | |
Wednesday 25 October 2023
| 35 | Fareham Town (9) | P–P | Wimborne Town (8) | |
| 11 | Heather St Johns (10) | 0–6 | Chesterfield (5) | 155 |
| 22 | Tring Athletic (9) | 4–0 | Jersey Bulls (9) | 198 |
Match was played at Hemel Hempstead Town.
Thursday 26 October 2023
| 30 | Torquay United (6) | 2–5 | Reading City (9) | |
Match was played at Reading City FC.
Friday 27 October 2023
| 19 | Stanway Rovers (9) | 0–1 | Barking (9) | |
Tuesday 31 October 2023
| 35 | Fareham Town (9) | 0–4 | Wimborne Town (8) | |
Match was played at Wimborne Town.

== Competition Proper ==
=== First Round ===
Forty-five teams from League One and League Two joined the 35 winners from the previous round. Barrow AFC, Crawley Town, and Wycombe Wanderers will not participate in this round as they did not apply to enter the competition. Chester-Le-Street United, from the tenth tier of English football, is the lowest-ranked team left in the competition. The draw was made on 20 October 2023.

Number of teams per tier still in competition
| Premier League (Note: Premier League and Championship teams will join the competition in the third round.) | Championship | League One | League Two | Non-League | Total |
|---|---|---|---|---|---|
| 20 / 20 | 24 / 24 | 23 / 23 | 22 / 22 | 35 / 35 | 124 / 124 |

| 30 October 2023 | Doncaster Rovers (4) | 0–1 | AFC Fylde (5) | Doncaster |
| 19:00 GMT | | Report | Ormerod 90+3' | Stadium: Eco-Power Stadium; Attendance: 320; Referee: William Cavanagh |

| 30 October 2023 | Thame United (8) | 3–6 | Forest Green Rovers (4) | Thame |
| 19:45 GMT | Thomas 23'; Mayor 35'; Beadle 40' | Report | Sully 43' (pen.), 90+4', 90+7'; Alonzi 67', 74'; McKenzie 89' | Stadium: Meadow View Park; Attendance: 188; Referee: John Perry |

| 31 October 2023 | Carlisle United (3) | 1–5 | Barnsley (3) | Carlisle |
| 18:00 GMT | Fitzpatrick 28' | Report | Nzondo 37', 74'; McCann 49'; Maddison 53' (o.g.); Yoganathan 59' | Stadium: Brunton Park; Attendance: 260; Referee: Scott Henry |

| 31 October 2023 | Bolton Wanderers (3) | 2–0 | Blackpool (3) | Chorley |
| 19:00 GMT | Lawrence 47'; Fleury 54' | | | Stadium: Victory Park; Attendance: 276; Referee: Adam Watson |

| 31 October 2023 | Shrewsbury Town (3) | 0–3 | Grimsby Town (4) | Shrewsbury |
| 19:00 GMT | | | Clements 22'; Collins 75'; Gardner 90' | Stadium: New Meadow; Referee: Lewis Mountain |

| 31 October 2023 | Notts County (4) | 0–3 | Lincoln City (3) | Nottingham |
| 19:00 GMT | | Report | Okoro 49', 69'; Berko 76' | Stadium: Meadow Lane; Attendance: 496; Referee: Matthew Friend |

| 31 October 2023 | Colchester United (4) | 2–2 (a.e.t.) (7–8 p) | Sutton United (4) | Colchester |
| 19:00 GMT | Arnold 30'; Sabah 50' | | Trickett 17'; Moore 61' | Stadium: Colchester Community Stadium; Attendance: 176; Referee: Neil Howlett |
| | Penalties |
| | Sabah (penalty scored); Jolliffe (penalty scored); Drysdale (penalty scored); Martin (penalty scored); Gordon-Clement (penalty scored); Oni (penalty scored); Kokoshi (penalty scored); Akor (penalty missed) | | Penalty scored |

| 31 October 2023 | Leyton Orient (3) | 2–1 | AFC Sudbury (7) | Leyton |
| 19:00 GMT | Smith-Kouassi 45+1', 90+8' | | Donohue 42' (pen.) | Stadium: Brisbane Road; Attendance: 355; Referee: Joanne Horwood |

| 31 October 2023 | Eastleigh (5) | 2–1 | Portsmouth (3) | Eastleigh |
| 19:00 GMT | Godfroy 20'; Colvin 70' | Report | Hurst 90+3' | Stadium: Ten Acres; Attendance: 342; Referee: Paul Barber |

| 31 October 2023 | Bristol Rovers (3) | 1–2 | Cheltenham Town (3) | Bristol |
| 19:00 GMT | Dewsbury 90+4' | | Willcox 27'; King 90+1' | Stadium: Memorial Stadium; Attendance: 509; Referee: George Lynch |
Note: Match was moved 15 minutes from kickoff.

| 31 October 2023 | AFC Wimbledon (4) | 2–1 (a.e.t.) | Cambridge United (3) | Wimbledon |
| 19:15 GMT | Horan 55'; Clarke 120' | | Munday 79' | Stadium: Plough Lane; Attendance: 350; Referee: James Keane |

| 31 October 2023 | Bury Town (8) | 1–4 | Charlton Athletic (3) | Bury St Edmunds |
| 19:30 GMT | Curtis 39' | Report | Casey 6', 16', 67'; Mbick 73' | Stadium: Ram Meadow; Attendance: 355; Referee: Thomas Harvey |

| 31 October 2023 | Oxford City (5) | 1–4 | Reading (3) | Marston |
| 19:45 GMT | Sheppard 67' | | Spencer 4'; Smith 28'; Osho 36'; Barough 56' | Stadium: RAW Charging Stadium; Referee: Luis Nunes |
Note: Kickoff was changed from 19:00 to 19:45

| 1 November 2023 | Morecambe (4) | 3–2 (a.e.t.) | Wrexham (4) | Morecambe |
| 19:00 GMT | Mercer 57'; Fox-Akande 77'; Holden 99' | Report | Rainbird 20'; Connolly 90+10' | Stadium: Mazuma Stadium; Attendance: 229; Referee: Christopher Porter |

| 1 November 2023 | Salford City (4) | 0–3 | Accrington Stanley (4) | Kersal |
| 19:00 GMT | | | Young 37'; Popoola 56' (pen.), 75' | Stadium: The Peninsula Stadium; Attendance: 437; Referee: Zharir Mustafa |

| 1 November 2023 | Bradford City (4) | 2–0 | Tranmere Rovers (4) | Birkenhead |
| 19:00 GMT | Ibbitson 7', 28' (pen.) | | | Stadium: Prenton Park; Referee: Francis Sibley |
Note: Tranmere Rovers are the away team even though they are hosting Bradford City.

| 1 November 2023 | Burton Albion (3) | 2–1 | Port Vale (3) | Burton upon Trent |
| 19:00 GMT | Scott 70'; Baker-McKay 84' | | Lomax 57' | Stadium: Pirelli Stadium; Referee: Jamie Conde |

| 1 November 2023 | Oxford United (3) | 3–0 | Bridgwater United (9) | Marston |
| 19:00 GMT | Elliott-Wheeler 38'; Snowden 53'; Bradney 90' | Report | | Stadium: RAW Charging Stadium; Attendance: 168; Referee: Samuel Olhausen |

| 1 November 2023 | Chester-Le-Street United (10) | 2–0 | Guiseley (7) | Sunderland |
| 19:30 GMT | Anderson 3'; Lawton 86' | | | Stadium: Ford Quarry; Attendance: 88; Referee: David Holmes |

| 1 November 2023 | Stourbridge (7) | 0–3 | Milton Keynes Dons (4) | Amblecote |
| 19:45 GMT | | | Daffern 29', 43'; Adepoju 90+5' | Stadium: War Memorial Athletic Ground; Attendance: 270; Referee: Andrew Biggin |

| 1 November 2023 | Ware (8) | 1–2 | Gillingham (4) | Ware |
| 19:45 GMT | Drayton 41' | | Bayliss 2'; Waldock 25' | Stadium: Wodson Park; Attendance: 262; Referee: Richard Wharton |

| 1 November 2023 | Aldershot Town (5) | 0–1 | Swindon Town (4) | Aldershot |
| 19:45 GMT | | Report | Britchford-Stanley 31' | Stadium: Recreation Ground; Attendance: 165; Referee: Derrick Laing |

| 2 November 2023 | Crewe Alexandra (4) | 1–1 (a.e.t.) (5–4 p) | Peterborough United (3) | Crewe |
| 19:00 GMT | Agius 12' | | Mills 81' | Stadium: Gresty Road; Attendance: 300; Referee: Benjamin Stott |
| | Penalties |
| | Agius (penalty scored); Sant (penalty scored); Collins (penalty scored); Senior (penalty scored); Hodkin (penalty scored) | | (penalty scored) Rose; (penalty scored) Mills; (penalty scored) Ntege; (penalty scored) Beech; (penalty missed) Toynton |

| 2 November 2023 | Dorking Wanderers (5) | 2–1 | Worthing (6) | Dorking |
| 19:30 GMT | Cowing 87'; Albert 90+5' | | Manchester 86' | Stadium: Meadowbank; Attendance: 220; Referee: Gerry Heron |

| 2 November 2023 | Lancaster City (7) | 2–3 | South Shields (6) | Lancaster |
| 19:45 GMT | Stafford 32'; Casson 79' | | Watts 18'; Telfer 29' (pen.); Henry 34' | Stadium: Giant Axe; Attendance: 112; Referee: Curtis Wood |

| 2 November 2023 | Mickleover (7) | 0–2 | Northampton Town (3) | Mickleover |
| 19:45 GMT | | | Guess 16'; Owen 34' | Stadium: Station Road; Referee: Wayne Gray |

| 3 November 2023 | Wigan Athletic (3) | 0–2 | Fleetwood Town (3) | Wigan |
| 18:30 GMT | | Report | Richmond 41'; Lane 43' | Stadium: DW Stadium; Attendance: 406; Referee: Taylor Metcalf |

| 3 November 2023 | Hemel Hempstead Town (6) | 4–0 | Takeley (9) | Hemel Hempstead |
| 20:00 GMT | Still 9', 31', 66'; Ejjahya 87' | | | Stadium: Vauxhall Road; Attendance: 333; Referee: Lee Markwick |

| 4 November 2023 | Rochdale (5) | 1–2 | Harrogate Town (4) | Rochdale |
| 12:00 GMT | Kelly 15' | | Bray 24' (pen.), 48' | Stadium: Crown Oil Arena; Attendance: 208; Referee: Mark Bates |

| 4 November 2023 | Walton & Hersham (7) | 0–3 | Erith & Belvedere (8) | Walton-on-Thames |
| 15:00 GMT | | | Button 45+4'; Aiyanyo 68'; Ogurogho 77' | Stadium: Elmbridge Sports Hub; Referee: Vladyslav Bakulin |

| 6 November 2023 | Reading City (9) | 3–5 (a.e.t.) | Exeter City (3) | Reading |
| 19:00 GMT | Ford 4' (pen.), 90+1'; 49' | | Dean 11'; Cunningham 19'; 45+1' (o.g.); Cutler 98'; Graham 120+2' | Stadium: Rivermoor Stadium; Attendance: 194; Referee: Oliver Kaya |
Note: Match was postponed due to a Waterlogged Pitch.

| 6 November 2023 | Kingstonian (7) | 0–1 | Barking (9) | Reigate |
| 19:45 GMT | | Report | Paponette 18' | Stadium: Whitehall Lane; Attendance: 87; Referee: Dennis Torres-Miranda |

| 7 November 2023 | Burgess Hill Town (8) | 1–5 | Stevenage (3) | Burgess Hill |
| 19:30 GMT | Brewer 11' | | Hicks 6', 75'; Norris 66'; Evans 89', 90+8' | Stadium: Leylands Park; Attendance: 291; Referee: Ciaran Fidler |
Note: Match was originally going to be played on October 31, 2023, but was postponed due to a Waterlogged Pitch.

| 8 November 2023 | Stockport County (4) | 3–0 | Farsley Celtic (6) | Stockport |
| 19:00 GMT | Mee 5', 90'; Hillary 8' | | | Stadium: Edgeley Park; Attendance: 434; Referee: Joe Cunningham |

| 8 November 2023 | Newport County (4) | 2–4 | Wimborne Town (8) | Leckwith |
| 19:00 GMT | Evans 17'; Shallis 30' | | Toghill 45+3', 66', 74' (pen.); Rodda 46' | Stadium: Leckwith Stadium; Attendance: 119; Referee: Adam Wilson |

| 8 November 2023 | Tring Athletic (9) | 4–0 | Berkhamsted (7) | Tring |
| 19:45 GMT | Butler; Sales | | | Stadium: Grass Roots Stadium; Attendance: 268; Referee: Colman O'Meara |
Note: Match was originally going to be played on November 2, 2023, but was postponed due to a Waterlogged Pitch.

| 9 November 2023 | Chesterfield (5) | 1–2 (a.e.t.) | Boldmere St Michaels (8) | Boldmere |
| 19:15 GMT | Simmonite 50' | | North 29', 108' | Stadium: Boldmere Community Stadium; Attendance: 86; Referee: Steven Taylor |
Note: Match was originally going to be played November 2, 2023 and November 8, 2023 but was postponed due to a waterlogged pitch. Match was moved to Boldmere St. Michaels on November 9, 2023.

| 9 November 2023 | Leighton Town (8) | 1–0 | Solihull Moors (5) | Leighton Buzzard |
| 19:30 GMT | Jaggard 90+4' | | | Stadium: Bell Close; Attendance: 159; Referee: Matthew Ball |
Note: Match originally going to be played on November 2, 2023, but was postponed due to a Waterlogged Pitch.

| 9 November 2023 | Chasetown (8) | 2–6 | Walsall (4) | Darlaston |
| 19:45 GMT | Cooper 21', 45+4' | Report | Wragg 12', 39', 54', 88'; Leydon 63'; Juliff 85' | Stadium: Bentley Sports Pavilion; Attendance: 210; Referee: James Lunn |
Note: Match originally going to be played on November 2, 2023, but was postponed due to a Waterlogged Pitch.

| 10 November 2023 | Mansfield Town (4) | 0–2 | Derby County (3) | Mansfield |
| 19:00 GMT | | Report | Brown 4' (pen.); Gill 90+2' | Stadium: Field Mill; Attendance: 678; Referee: Haydn Lavender |

=== Second Round ===
The 40 winners from the previous round played in this round. Chester-Le-Street United, from the tenth tier of English football, is the lowest-ranked team left in the competition. The draw was made on November 3, 2023.

Number of teams per tier still in competition
| Premier League | Championship | League One | League Two | Non-League | Total |
|---|---|---|---|---|---|
| 20 / 20 | 24 / 24 | 14 / 23 | 14 / 22 | 12 / 35 | 84 / 124 |

| 15 November 2023 | South Shields (6) | 1–5 | Grimsby Town (4) | South Shields |
| 19:00 GMT | Telfer 84' | Report | Gardner 32', 36', 59'; Giles 86', 90+3' | Stadium: 1st Cloud Arena; Attendance: 378; Referee: Christopher Ellis |

| 15 November 2023 | Swindon Town (4) | 5–0 | Wimborne Town (8) | Swindon |
| 19:00 GMT | Hubbard 24'; Britchford-Stanley 38'; Obodo 43', 77'; McGregor 85' | Report | | Stadium: County Ground; Attendance: 370; Referee: James Hooper |

| 15 November 2023 | Barking (9) | 1–0 | Milton Keynes Dons (4) | Dagenham |
| 19:30 GMT | Oumar-Ndao 83' | Report | | Stadium: Mayesbrook Park; Attendance: 263; Referee: Joanne Horwood |

| 16 November 2023 | Northampton Town (3) | 1–2 | Harrogate Town (4) | Northampton |
| 19:00 GMT | Ireland 6' | | Samuels 70'; Bray 90+1' | Stadium: Sixfields Stadium; Attendance: 448; Referee: Mario Stetakovic |

| 16 November 2023 | Crewe Alexandra (4) | 3–0 | Boldmere St Michaels (8) | Crewe |
| 19:30 GMT | Agius 13'; Moore 59'; Allport 85' | Report | | Stadium: Gresty Road; Attendance: 324; Referee: Jonathan Wyatt |

| 17 November 2023 | AFC Fylde (5) | 1–0 | Accrington Stanley (4) | Wesham |
| 19:00 GMT | McCullion 71' | Report | | Stadium: Mill Farm; Attendance: 775; Referee: Daniel Hitchell |

| 17 November 2023 | Oxford United (3) | 2–0 | Sutton United (4) | Marston |
| 19:00 GMT | Lacey 42'; Elliott-Wheeler 60' | Report | | Stadium: RAW Charging Stadium; Attendance: 172; Referee: Thomas Hood |

| 17 November 2023 | Hemel Hempstead Town (6) | 5–2 | Exeter City (3) | Hemel Hempstead |
| 20:00 GMT | Smith 8'; Still 22', 77' (pen.); Roberts 55'; Ejjayha 83' | | Cutler 5', 17' | Stadium: Vauxhall Road; Attendance: 406; Referee: Samuel Everitt |

| 20 November 2023 | Lincoln City (3) | 5–0 | Walsall (4) | Lincoln |
| 19:30 GMT | Okewoye 30'; Berko 43'; Okoro 46'; Nesbitt 68'; Adamson 84' | Report | | Stadium: LNER Stadium; Attendance: 303; Referee: Waqar Ahmad |

| 21 November 2023 | Cheltenham Town (3) | 3–0 | Dorking Wanderers (5) | Cheltenham |
| 19:00 GMT | King 10', 71'; Liggett 43' | Report | | Stadium: Whaddon Road; Attendance: 254; Referee: Jake Woolley |

| 22 November 2023 | Burton Albion (3) | 2–0 | Chester-Le-Street United (10) | Burton upon Trent |
| 19:00 | Pace 8'; Wakelin 30' | Report | | Stadium: Pirelli Stadium; Referee: Mitchell Cartwright |

| 22 November 2023 | Morecambe (4) | 1–2 | Fleetwood Town (3) | Morecambe |
| 19:00 | Dobson 14' | Report | Fletcher 31'; Daha 52' | Stadium: Mazuma Stadium; Attendance: 395; Referee: Andrew Daniels |

| 23 November 2023 | AFC Wimbledon (4) | 2–1 | Stevenage (3) | Wimbledon |
| 19:00 | Sidwell 7'; Jennings 20' | | Tekasala 50' | Stadium: Plough Lane; Referee: Christopher Poole |

| 23 November 2023 | Gillingham (4) | 3–1 | Eastleigh (5) | Gillingham |
| 19:00 GMT | De Wilde 38'; Heasman 80'; Clark 81' | | Ryan 61' | Stadium: Priestfield; Attendance: 286; Referee: Deryll David |

| 23 November 2023 | Leighton Town (8) | 0–1 (a.e.t.) | Stockport County (4) | Leighton Buzzard |
| 19:30 GMT | | | Gardner 117' | Stadium: Bell Close; Attendance: 300; Referee: Luke Scott |

| 23 November 2023 | Erith & Belvedere (8) | 1–11 | Charlton Athletic (3) | Welling |
| 19:45 GMT | Aiyanyo 10' | | Casey 5', 26' (pen.); Wales 19'; Rylah 36', 54'; Mbick 44', 47', 51'; Enslin 73'; Yamoah 77'; Tagoe 82' | Stadium: Park View Road; Attendance: 703; Referee: Matthew Ball |

| 24 November 2023 | Barnsley (3) | 3–2 (a.e.t.) | Bradford City (4) | Barnsley |
| 18:30 GMT | Alker 41'; Gledhill 70' (o.g.); Nzondo 99' | | Murray 68'; Ibbitson 84' (pen.) | Stadium: Oakwell; Attendance: 287; Referee: Adewunmi Soneye |

| 24 November 2023 | Reading (3) | 3–1 (a.e.t.) | Forest Green Rovers (4) | Reading |
| 19:00 GMT | Smith 40'; Spencer 106'; Barough 120+3' | | Sully 90+2' | Stadium: Madejski Stadium; Attendance: 454; Referee: Craig Davenport |

| 27 November 2023 | Bolton Wanderers (3) | 1–4 | Derby County (3) | Horwich |
| 19:00 GMT | Lawrence 90+1' | Report | Hawkins 40'; Wheeldon 45'; Brown 54' (pen.); Eames 83' | Stadium: Toughsheet Community Stadium; Attendance: 544; Referee: Zharir Mustafa |

| 28 November 2023 | Leyton Orient (3) | 3–1 | Tring Athletic (9) | Leyton |
| 19:00 GMT | Mohamud 9'; Avgoustidis 30'; Smith-Kouassi 47' | | Jewell 45+2' | Stadium: Brisbane Road; Attendance: 316; Referee: Lee Markwick |

=== Third Round ===
Sixty-four teams competed in the third round with the 44 Premier League and EFL Championship clubs appearing in this round along with the 20 winners from the previous round. Barking from the ninth tier was the lowest ranked team left in the competition. The Draw was made on 17 November 2023.

Number of teams per tier still in competition
| Premier League | Championship | League One | League Two | Non-League | Total |
|---|---|---|---|---|---|
| 20 / 20 | 24 / 24 | 10 / 23 | 7 / 22 | 3 / 35 | 64 / 124 |

| 30 November 2023 | Harrogate Town (4) | 1–4 | Brighton & Hove Albion | Harrogate |
| 19:00 GMT | Bray 74' | | Knight 28'; Mills 37'; Gorman 72'; Moulton 80' | Stadium: Wetherby Road; Attendance: 501; Referee: Ian Johnston |

| 1 December 2023 | Barnsley (3) | 2–1 (a.e.t.) | Lincoln City (3) | Barnsley |
| 18:30 GMT | Nzondo 53'; Jaló 113' | | Adamson 64' (pen.) | Stadium: Oakwell; Attendance: 191; Referee: Jordan Crossley |

| 5 December 2023 | Grimsby Town (4) | 1–0 (a.e.t.) | Nottingham Forest | Cleethorpes |
| 19:00 GMT | Brown 115' | | | Stadium: Blundell Park; Attendance: 388; Referee: Michael Robinson |

| 5 December 2023 | Brentford | 1–5 | Tottenham Hotspur | Staines |
| 19:00 GMT | Morgan 61' | Report | Hall 31'; Akhamrich 59'; Morgan 72'; Ajayi 74'; Olusesi 90+3' | Stadium: Wheatsheaf Park; Attendance: 550; Referee: Elliott Kaye |

| 5 December 2023 | Ipswich Town (2) | 1–2 | Swansea City (2) | Ipswich |
| 19:00 GMT | Turner 45+2' | | Woodward 38'; Davies 43' | Stadium: Portman Road; Attendance: 352; Referee: Neil Howlett |

| 5 December 2023 | Millwall (2) | 5–3 (a.e.t.) | Barking (9) | Bermondsey |
| 19:00 GMT | Heywood 5' (pen.), 92', 115'; O'Boyle 56'; Kendall 69' | Report | Connolly 66' (pen.), 71' (pen.); Dorrell 75' | Stadium: The Den; Attendance: 570; Referee: Michael Scott |

| 6 December 2023 | West Bromwich Albion (2) | 0–2 | AFC Bournemouth | West Bromwich |
| 19:00 GMT | | | Clarke 38', 45+3' | Stadium: The Hawthorns; Attendance: 383; Referee: Mitchell Cartwright |

| 6 December 2023 | Preston North End (2) | 3–3 (a.e.t.) (4–5 p) | Coventry City (2) | Preston |
| 19:00 GMT | Mawene 12'; Rodriguez-Gentile 45+3'; Wilkinson 120+1' | Report | Dausch 25', 84'; Finney 101' | Stadium: Deepdale; Attendance: 403; Referee: Jonathan Chadwick |
| | Penalties |
| | Rodriguez-Gentile (penalty scored); McGhee (penalty scored); Wilkinson (penalty scored); Khan (penalty missed); Horan (penalty scored) | | (penalty scored) Andrews; (penalty scored) Dausch; (penalty scored) Stretton; (penalty scored) Ambursley; (penalty scored) Perry |

| 7 December 2023 | Plymouth Argyle (2) | 1–2 | Crystal Palace | Plymouth |
| 19:00 GMT | Roberts 45+1' | Report | King 11', 80' | Stadium: Home Park; Attendance: 1,102; Referee: Marc Whaley |

| 8 December 2023 | West Ham United | 1–1 (a.e.t.) (4–2 p) | Southampton (2) | Romford |
| 19:00 GMT | Fawunmi 49' | | Robinson 43' | Stadium: Rush Green Stadium; Attendance: 250; Referee: Lee Markwick |
| | Penalties |
| | Orford (penalty scored); Scarles (penalty scored); Jones (penalty scored); Briggs (penalty scored) | | (penalty scored) Dibling; (penalty missed) Daley; (penalty scored) Sesay; (penalty missed) Amo-Ameyaw |

| 8 December 2023 | Leicester City (2) | 1–3 | Chelsea | Seagrave |
| 19:00 GMT | Joseph 51' | | McNeilly 1'; Golding 68'; Mheuka 86' | Stadium: Leicester City F.C. Training Ground; Attendance: 450; Referee: Martyn Gospel |

| 9 December 2023 | Arsenal | 7–1 | Crewe Alexandra (4) | Borehamwood |
| 19:00 GMT | Brown 48'; Nwaneri 53', 60', 70', 74', 76'; Benjamin 90+1' | | Nolan 14' | Stadium: Meadow Park; Attendance: 234; Referee: Vladyslav Bakulin |

| 12 December 2023 | Everton | 4–1 | Stockport County (4) | Walton |
| 19:00 GMT | Sherif 39', 61'; Apter 86'; Morgan 90+10' | | Depeiaza 45+1' | Stadium: Goodison Park; Attendance: 539; Referee: Richard Holmes |

| 12 December 2023 | AFC Fylde (5) | 0–3 | Hull City (2) | Wesham |
| 19:00 GMT | | | Kelly 31', 51', 64' | Stadium: Mill Farm; Attendance: 458; Referee: Graeme Kearney |

| 13 December 2023 | Burton Albion (3) | 3–1 | Aston Villa | Burton |
| 19:00 GMT | Baker-McKay 20'; Scott 49' (pen.), 81' | | Jimoh 7' | Stadium: Pirelli Stadium; Referee: David Hinton |

| 13 December 2023 | Wolverhampton Wanderers | 2–2 (a.e.t.) (8–9 p) | Queens Park Rangers (2) | Wolverhampton |
| 19:00 GMT | Reynolds 45+5'; Chiwome 92' | | Bouhiaoui 41'; Edmondson 116' | Stadium: Molineux Stadium; Referee: Richard Walker |
| | Penalties |
| | Chiwome (penalty missed); Bradbury (penalty missed); Angel (penalty scored); Voice (penalty scored); Carson (penalty scored); Patterson (penalty scored); Okoduwa (penalty scored); White (penalty scored); Harper (penalty scored); Rees (penalty scored); Benjamin (penalty missed); Chiwome (penalty missed) | | (penalty missed) Young; (penalty scored) Tuck; (penalty scored) Yahyaoui; (penalty missed) Manufor; (penalty scored) Bouhiaoui; (penalty scored) Leahy; (penalty scored) Putman; (penalty scored) Neill; (penalty scored) Sutton; (penalty scored) Edmondson; (penalty missed) Clark; (penalty scored) Young |

| 14 December 2023 | Reading (3) | 6–0 | Rotherham United (2) | Reading |
| 19:00 GMT | Harris 8', 18' (pen.), 79'; Barough 35', 53'; Spencer 90' | | | Stadium: Madejski Stadium; Attendance: 333; Referee: George Lynch |

| 14 December 2023 | Sunderland (2) | 5–2 | Middlesbrough (2) | Sunderland |
| 19:00 GMT | Watson 14', 90+1' (pen.); Bell 32'; Robertson 39'; Geragusian 90+3' | | Cartwright 69'; Lennon 76' | Stadium: Stadium of Light; Attendance: 902; Referee: Sam Parnaby |

| 14 December 2023 | Bristol City (2) | 3–0 | Stoke City (2) | Failand |
| 19:00 GMT | Bak 29'; Hewlett 33' (pen.); Nelson 73' | Report | | Stadium: Robins High Performance Centre; Attendance: 350; Referee: Carl Peters |

| 15 December 2023 | Norwich City (2) | 0–2 | Leeds United (2) | Norwich |
| 17:00 GMT | | Report | Wilson 4'; Toulson 55' | Stadium: Carrow Road; Attendance: 587; Referee: Nathan Oakes |

| 15 December 2023 | AFC Wimbledon (4) | 1–0 | Blackburn Rovers (2) | Wimbledon |
| 18:00 GMT | Jennings 65' (pen.) | | | Stadium: Plough Lane; Attendance: 482; Referee: Oliver Kaya |

| 15 December 2023 | Cardiff City (2) | 1–2 | Fulham | Cardiff |
| 19:00 GMT | George 38' | | King 66'; Osmand 90+2' | Stadium: Cardiff International Sports Stadium; Attendance: 282; Referee: James Hooper |

| 15 December 2023 | Luton Town | 0–2 | Swindon Town (4) | Luton |
| 19:00 GMT | | Report | Hart 45+3'; Keyes 60' | Stadium: Kenilworth Road; Attendance: 463; Referee: Neil Morrison |

| 17 December 2023 | Sheffield Wednesday (2) | 2–2 (a.e.t.) (5–4 p) | Hemel Hempstead Town (6) | Sheffield |
| 15:00 GMT | Moses 34'; Weston 120+2' | | Still 44'; Harvey 110' | Stadium: Hillsborough Stadium; Attendance: 202; Referee: Jamie Rhodes |
| | Penalties |
| | Dawes (penalty scored) | | (penalty missed) Still; (penalty scored) Roberts; (penalty scored) Ejjayha |
Note: Match was originally going to be played on 9 December 2023, but was postponed due to a waterlogged pitch.

| 18 December 2023 | Sheffield United | 1–0 | Cheltenham Town (3) | Scunthorpe |
| 19:00 GMT | Blacker 5' | | | Stadium: Glanford Park; Attendance: 173; Referee: Wayne Gray |

| 18 December 2023 | Burnley | 2–2 (a.e.t.) (4–3 p) | Birmingham City (2) | Leyland |
| 19:00 GMT | Johnson 4'; Rogers 120+3' | | Mazwi 80', 111' | Stadium: County Ground; Attendance: 256; Referee: Christopher Porter |
| | Penalties |
| | Wane (penalty missed); Vaughan (penalty scored); Masara (penalty missed); West (penalty scored); McEvilly (penalty scored); Pimlott (penalty scored) | | (penalty scored) Ellis; (penalty missed) Bateman; (penalty scored) Pendleton; (penalty scored) Tattum; (penalty missed) Mazwi; (penalty missed) Willis |
Note: Match was originally going to be played on 6 December 2023, but was postponed due to a frozen pitch.

| 18 December 2023 | Huddersfield Town (2) | 1–2 | Charlton Athletic (3) | Huddersfield |
| 19:00 GMT | Bakre 57' | | Wales 66'; Casey 75' | Stadium: John Smith's Stadium; Attendance: 123; Referee: Melissa Burgin |

| 19 December 2023 | Newcastle United | 7–2 | Leyton Orient (3) | Newcastle |
| 12:00 GMT | Munda 13'; Bailey 17'; Neave 20', 56'; Sanusi 54'; Powell 83'; Charlton 90+1' | | Avgoustidis 7'; Smith-Kouassi 43' | Stadium: Whitley Park; Attendance: 111; Referee: Givi Todua |

| 19 December 2023 | Fleetwood Town (3) | 1–2 | Liverpool | Fleetwood |
| 19:00 GMT | Daha 62' | | Danns 45', 90+4' | Stadium: Highbury Stadium; Attendance: 528; Referee: Curtis Wood |
Note: Match was originally going to be played on 10 December 2023, but was postponed due to a waterlogged pitch.

| 19 December 2023 | Watford (2) | 0–2 | Manchester City | Watford |
| 19:00 GMT | | Report | Warhurst 16'; Heskey 47' | Stadium: Vicarage Road; Attendance: 1,255; Referee: Samuel Everitt |

| 19 December 2023 | Manchester United | 1–0 | Derby County (3) | Old Trafford |
| 19:00 GMT | Williams 76' | | | Stadium: Old Trafford; Attendance: 2,850; Referee: Alexander Beckett |

| 19 December 2023 | Gillingham (4) | 2–1 (a.e.t.) | Oxford United (3) | Gillingham |
| 19:00 GMT | Dobbs 7'; Garrett 102' (pen.) | | Snowden 52' | Stadium: Priestfield; Attendance: 276 (30 Away); Referee: Gerry Heron |

=== Fourth Round ===
Third-two teams participated in the fourth round proper, with all 32 winners from the previous round participating. The lowest ranked teams left in the Competition were AFC Wimbledon, Gillingham, Grimsby Town, and Swindon Town from the fourth Tier EFL League Two. The Draw was done on 7 December 2023.

Number of teams per tier still in competition
| Premier League | Championship | League One | League Two | Non-League | Total |
|---|---|---|---|---|---|
| 15 / 20 | 9 / 24 | 4 / 23 | 4 / 22 | 0 / 35 | 32 / 124 |

| 9 January 2024 | Sheffield Wednesday (2) | 0–4 | Reading (3) | Sheffield |
| 19:00 GMT | | | Coke 27', 41', 60'; Harris 79' | Stadium: Hillsborough Stadium; Attendance: 254; Referee: David Jones |

| 10 January 2024 | Sheffield United | 1–0 | AFC Wimbledon (4) | Sheffield |
| 19:00 GMT | Blacker 79' | | | Stadium: Brammall Lane; Attendance: 769; Referee: Alex Sawden |

| 12 January 2024 | West Ham United | 0–2 (a.e.t.) | Manchester City | Romford |
| 19:00 GMT | | | Wright 94' (pen.); Oboavwoduo 104' | Stadium: Rush Green Stadium; Attendance: 560; Referee: Shelby Elson |

| 16 January 2024 | Hull City (2) | 0–5 | Crystal Palace | Kingston Upon Hull |
| 19:00 GMT | | | Mustapha 28'; Agbinone 31'; Williams 33'; Marsh 44', 48' | Stadium: MKM Stadium; Attendance: 560; Referee: Lewis Dawson |

| 16 January 2024 | Swindon Town (4) | 2–0 | Manchester United | Swindon |
| 19:00 GMT | Ameen 14', 39' | Report | | Stadium: County Ground; Attendance: 2,187; Referee: Neil Pratt |

| 16 January 2024 | Burton Albion (3) | 1–3 | Tottenham Hotspur | Burton |
| 19:00 GMT | Baker-McKay 52' | Report | Hall 44'; Lehane 47'; Irow 90+3' | Stadium: Pirelli Stadium; Attendance: 521; Referee: Ashley Clarke |

| 17 January 2024 | Newcastle United | 0–5 | AFC Bournemouth | Newcastle upon Tyne |
| 19:00 GMT | | | Clarke 1'; Stuttle 31', 44' (pen.), 50'; Holman 41' | Stadium: St. James' Park; Attendance: 2,543; Referee: Helen Conley |

| 17 January 2024 | Swansea City (2) | A–A | Fulham | Landore |
| 19:00 GMT | Griffith 39' | | | Stadium: Landore Training Centre; Attendance: 150; Referee: Matthew Scholes |
Note: Match was abandoned after 45 minutes due to a frozen pitch. Swansea City were leading 1–0 on a goal by Yori Griffith.

| 17 January 2024 | Coventry City (2) | 4–2 | Barnsley (3) | Coventry |
| 19:00 GMT | Siddall 5'; Andrews 13'; Ambursley 39'; Dausch 89' | | Jalo 2', 90+2' | Stadium: CBS Arena; Attendance: 341; Referee: Niall Smith |

| 20 January 2024 | Brighton & Hove Albion | 0–4 | Leeds United (2) | Brighton |
| 15:00 GMT | | | McFadden 21', 60'; Wilson 66'; Cresswell 76' | Stadium: AMEX Elite Performance Centre; Attendance: 150; Referee: Isaac Searle |

| 20 January 2024 | Liverpool | 7–1 | Arsenal | Kirkby |
| 17:00 GMT | Koumas 10', 31', 88'; Kone-Doherty 35', 52'; Danns 57', 63' | | Nwaneri 15' | Stadium: Liverpool Academy; Attendance: 300; Referee: Jonathan Maskrey |

| 21 January 2024 | Everton | 0–2 | Chelsea | Walton Hall Park |
| 19:00 GMT | | | McNeilly 21'; George 62' | Stadium: Walton Hall Park; Attendance: 241; Referee: Robert Claussen |
Note: Match was originally going to be played on 18 January 2024, but was postponed.

| 22 January 2024 | Queens Park Rangers (2) | 0–2 | Burnley | Shepherd's Bush |
| 19:00 GMT | | | Vaughan 45+2'; Campbell 47' | Stadium: Loftus Road; Attendance: 916; Referee: Matthew Norton |

| 23 January 2024 | Gillingham (4) | 0–3 | Sunderland (2) | Gillingham |
| 19:00 GMT | | Report | Beattie 18'; Samuel-Ogunsuyi 58'; Robertson 81' | Stadium: Priestfield Stadium; Attendance: 337; Referee: Constantine Hatzidakis |
Note: Match was originally going to be played on 16 January 2024, but was postponed due to a frozen pitch.

| 23 January 2024 | Bristol City (2) | 1–0 | Charlton Athletic (3) | Failand |
| 19:00 GMT | Bak 75' | | | Stadium: Robins High Performance Centre; Attendance: 169; Referee: Phillip Eddie |
Note: The match was originally going to be played on 10 January 2024, but was postponed due to a frozen pitch. It was also supposed to be played 17 January 2024, but was postponed again due to a frozen pitch.

| 24 January 2024 | Swansea City (2) | 0–5 | Fulham | Landore |
| 18:00 GMT | | | Osmand 12', 44', 66'; Esenga 69'; Gordon 89' | Stadium: Landore Training Centre; Attendance: 309; Referee: Matthew Scholes |
Note: Match was abandoned after 45 minutes due to a frozen pitch. Swansea City were leading 1–0 on a goal by Yori Griffith.

| 24 January 2024 | Grimsby Town (4) | 1–4 | Millwall (2) | Cleethorpes |
| 19:00 GMT | Collins 89' | | Maciocia 58'; Baker 67'; Heywood 75'; Whitby 85' | Stadium: Blundell Park; Attendance: 969; Referee: Dane McCarrick |
Note: Match was originally going to be played on 16 January 2024, but was moved due to death of Grismby Town Player. Then was moved again due to a frozen pitch.

=== Fifth Round ===
Sixteen teams participated in the fifth round proper with the 16 winners from the previous round participating. The lowest ranked team left in the Competition was Swindon Town from the fourth Tier EFL League Two. The draw was made on 12 January 2024.

Number of teams per tier still in competition
| Premier League | Championship | League One | League Two | Non-League | Total |
|---|---|---|---|---|---|
| 9 / 20 | 5 / 24 | 1 / 23 | 1 / 22 | 0 / 35 | 16 / 124 |

| 2 February 2024 | Coventry City (2) | 0–3 | Millwall (2) | Coventry |
| 19:00 GMT | | | Heywood 9', 32'; Olugbodi 65' | Stadium: CBS Arena; Attendance: 330; Referee: Jonathan Maskrey |

| 2 February 2024 | Sunderland (2) | 1–2 | Swindon Town (4) | Sunderland |
| 19:00 GMT | Samuel-Ogunsuyi 29' | | Alston 1'; Ameen 6' | Stadium: Stadium of Light; Attendance: 327; Referee: David Jones |

| 4 February 2024 | Liverpool | 3–0 | Fulham | Kirkby |
| 13:00 GMT | Koumas 56'; Morrison 57'; Danns 73' | | | Stadium: Liverpool Academy; Attendance: 300; Referee: William Davis |

| 6 February 2024 | Tottenham Hotspur | 6–2 | AFC Bournemouth | Wimbledon |
| 19:00 GMT | Olusesi 2'; Moore 7', 33'; Irow 26', 90+2'; Ajayi 57' | | Rees-Dottin 56'; Day 89' | Stadium: Plough Lane; Attendance: 350; Referee: Morgan Cann |

| 7 February 2024 | Sheffield United | 1–1 (4–5 p) | Leeds United (2) | Sheffield |
| 19:00 GMT | Blacker 74' | | Wilson 60' | Stadium: Bramall Lane; Attendance: 872; Referee: Darren Rogers |
| | Penalties |
| | Aston (penalty scored); Blacker (penalty scored); Blaize (penalty missed); Prunty (penalty scored); Haughton-Parris (penalty scored); Okyere (penalty missed) | | (penalty scored) Toulson; (penalty scored) McFadden; (penalty missed) Wilson; (penalty scored) Pirie; (penalty scored) Chadwick; (penalty scored) McDonald |

| 7 February 2024 | Bristol City (2) | 3–0 | Burnley | Failand |
| 19:00 GMT | Hewlett 32' (pen.); Morrison 49', 72' | | | Stadium: Robins High Performance Centre; Attendance: 300; Referee: Liam Corbett |

| 8 February 2024 | Crystal Palace | 1–2 | Chelsea | Selhurst |
| 19:00 GMT | Derry 85' | | Morgan 65'; George 68' | Stadium: Selhurst Park; Attendance: 2,123; Referee: Steven Hughes |

| 14 February 2024 | Manchester City | 2–1 | Reading (3) | Manchester |
| 19:00 GMT | Heskey 8'; Lawrence 19' | | Coke 68' | Stadium: Academy Stadium; Attendance: 474; Referee: Matthew McQuillan |

=== Quarterfinals ===
Eight teams participated in the quarter-finals with all eight winners from the previous round participating. The lowest ranked team left in the Competition was Swindon Town from the fourth Tier EFL League Two. The draw was made on 2 February 2024.

Number of teams per tier still in competition
| Premier League | Championship | League One | League Two | Non-League | Total |
|---|---|---|---|---|---|
| 4 / 20 | 3 / 24 | 0 / 23 | 1 / 22 | 0 / 35 | 8 / 124 |

| 21 February 2024 | Millwall (2) | 1–1 (a.e.t.) (4–2 p) | Chelsea | Bermondsey |
| 19:00 GMT | Howland 71' | Report | Murray-Campbell 66' | Stadium: The Den; Attendance: 2,356; Referee: Paul Johnson |
| | Penalties |
| | Howland (penalty scored); Maciocia (penalty scored); Heywood (penalty scored); Stephenson (penalty scored) | | (penalty scored) Harrison; (penalty missed) Cardoso; (penalty scored) George; (penalty missed) Golding |

| 24 February 2024 | Manchester City | 2–1 | Tottenham Hotspur | Manchester |
| 13:00 GMT | Fletcher 84'; Wright 90' | | Hall 62' | Stadium: Academy Stadium; Attendance: 363; Referee: Andrew Humphries |

| 29 February 2024 | Leeds United (2) | 3–1 | Liverpool | Beeston |
| 19:00 GMT | Chadwick 34', 70'; Lane 53' | Report | Kone-Doherty 89' | Stadium: Elland Road; Attendance: 3,460; Referee: Ben Wyatt |

| 7 March 2024 | Bristol City (2) | 1–0 | Swindon Town (4) | Bristol |
| 19:00 GMT | Phillips 43' | Report | | Stadium: Ashton Gate; Attendance: 1,337; Referee: Matthew Russell |

=== Semifinals ===
Four teams participated in the semi-finals with all four winners from the previous round participating. The lowest-ranked teams left in the competition were Bristol City, Leeds United, and Millwall from the EFL Championship. The draw was done on 23 February 2024.

Number of teams per tier still in competition
| Premier League | Championship | League One | League Two | Non-League | Total |
|---|---|---|---|---|---|
| 1 / 20 | 3 / 24 | 0 / 23 | 0 / 22 | 0 / 35 | 4 / 124 |

| 2 April 2024 | Manchester City | 1–0 | Bristol City (2) | Manchester |
| 19:00 GMT | Muir 80' | | | Stadium: Academy Stadium; Attendance: 1,144; Referee: Adam Herczeg |

| 4 April 2024 | Leeds United (2) | 4–3 | Millwall (2) | Beeston |
| 19:00 GMT | Chadwick 27' (pen.); Crew 32'; Beaumont 58' (o.g.); Cresswell 71' | | Heywood 18'; Stephenson 54'; Beaumont 61' | Stadium: Elland Road; Attendance: 10,493; Referee: Thomas Kirk |

=== Final ===
The winners of the semi-finals advanced to the final to determine the winner of the FA Youth Cup. The draw was done on 23 February 2024.

10 May 2024
19:00 GMT

| Manchester City | 4–0 | Leeds United (2) |
|---|---|---|
| Oboavwoduo 47'; Heskey 59'; Mfuni 70'; Warhurst 82' | Report |

Etihad Stadium, Manchester
Attendance: 20,000
Referee: Dean Whitestone
