= Wakelin =

Wakelin is a surname. Notable people with this surname include:

- Barry Wakelin (1946–2023), Australian politician
- Cara Wakelin (born 1977), Canadian model and actress
- Chris Wakelin (born 1992), English snooker player
- Daniel Wakelin (born 1977), English palaeographist
- Darryl Wakelin (born 1974), Australian footballer
- David Lawley Wakelin, documentarist
- Edwin Wakelin (1880–1925), English cricketer
- James H. Wakelin, Jr. (1911–1990) government official
- Johnny Wakelin (born 1939), British recording artist
- Kingsley Wakelin (born 1968), South African politician
- Mary A. Hitchcock Wakelin (1834–1900), American temperance reformer
- Roland Wakelin (1887–1971), Australian painter
- Ronny Wakelin (born 2006), English professional footballer
- Shane Wakelin (born 1974), Australian footballer

== See also ==
- Wakelin v London & South Western Railway Co., 1886 lawsuit
