= Stephen Mfuni =

English footballer (born 2008)

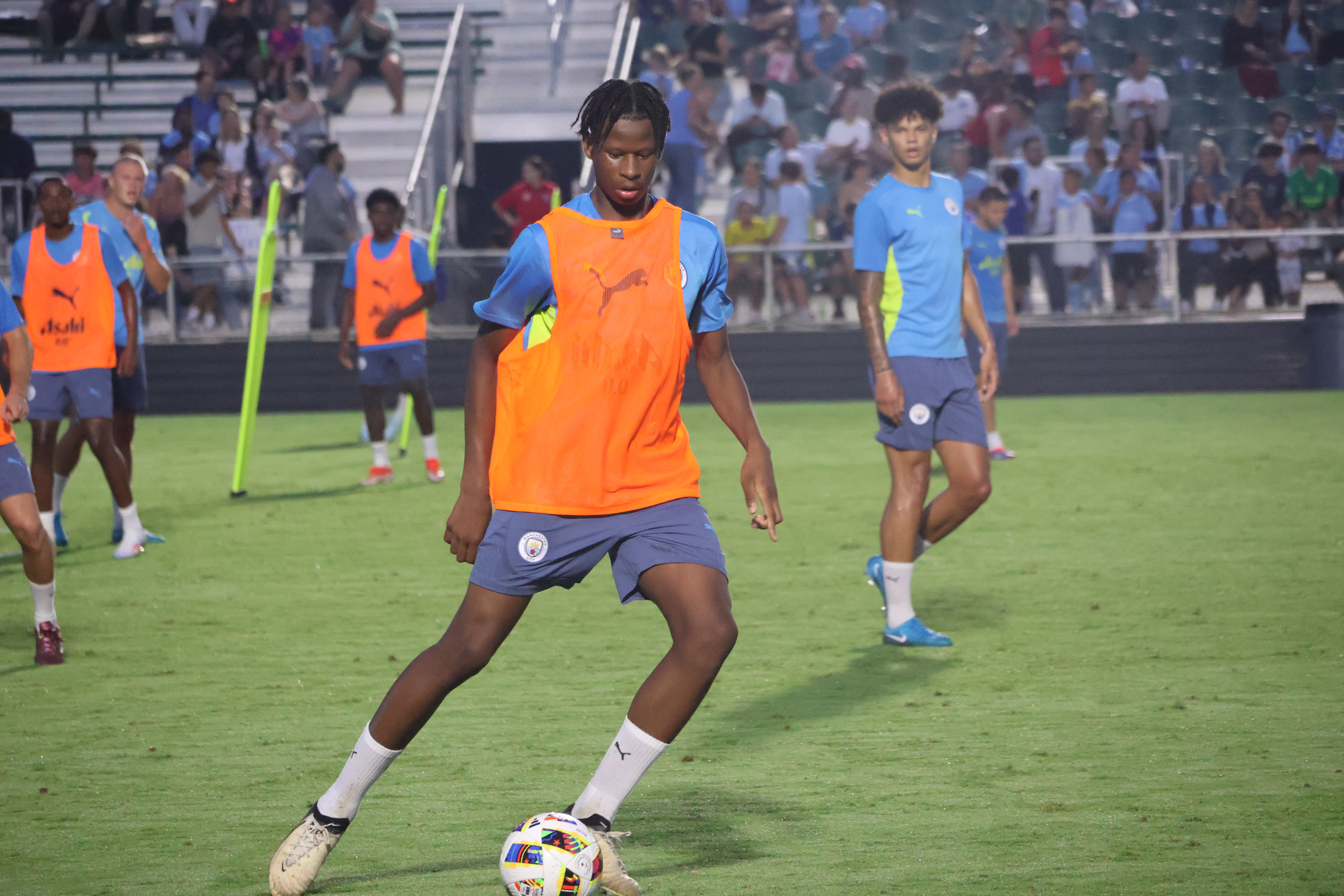
- Mfuni with Manchester City in 2024

Personal information
- Full name: Stephen-Nevin Mutanda Mfuni
- Date of birth: 12 February 2008 (age 18)
- Place of birth: Wigan, England
- Height: 1.93 m (6 ft 4 in)
- Positions: Centre-back; left-back

Team information
- Current team: Coventry City (on loan from Manchester City)
- Number: 12

Youth career
- 2016–2026: Manchester City

Senior career*
Years	Team	Apps	(Gls)
2026–	Manchester City	0	(0)
2026	→ Watford (loan)	8	(0)
2026–	→ Coventry City (loan)	6	(1)

International career^{‡}
2022–2023	England U16	7	(1)
2023–2024	England U17	8	(0)
2024	England U18	2	(0)
2024–	England U19	17	(0)
2026–	England U21	2	(0)
- * Club domestic league appearances and goals as of 00:15, 12 October 2026 (UTC) ‡ National team caps and goals as of 21:22, 6 October 2026 (UTC)

Stephen-Nevin Mutanda Mfuni (born 12 February 2008) is an English professional footballer who plays center-back or left-back for Premier League club Coventry City on loan from Manchester City.

== Club career ==
Mfuni was born in Wigan. He joined Manchester City at under-9 level. Capable of playing center-half or left back, he scored for Manchester City as they defeated Leeds United in the 2023–24 FA Youth Cup final. Mfuni featured for the Manchester City first team in their preseason tour of North America in 2024. That year, he was included in The Guardian’s Next Generation 2024: 20 of the best talents at Premier League clubs series in October 2024.

During the 2025-26 season, having been on the bench for matches in various competitions, including against Manchester United, Napoli and Huddersfield Town, Mfuni made his first team debut on 10 January 2026 as a half-time substitute for Nathan Aké in an FA Cup third round tie against Exeter City, which finished 10–1. On 30 January 2026, Mfuni joined Championship side Watford on loan until the end of the season.

In August 2026, Mfuni joined newly promoted Premier League club Coventry City on a season-long loan. He scored his first league goal for the club on 12 October 2026, scoring the fourth goal in a 4–1 win against Newcastle United.

== International career ==
Born in England, Mfuni is of DR Congolese descent. He is an England youth international. Having already represented England at U16 level, Mfuni was part of the England U17 side at the 2024 UEFA European Under-17 Championship and started their quarter-final defeat against Italy.

Mfuni was a member of the England under-19 squad at the 2025 UEFA European Under-19 Championship. He started all three of their games during the tournament as England were eliminated at the group stage.

In September 2026, Mfuni was called up to the England U21 squad for the first time. On 25 September, he made his debut as a starter in a 4–2 victory against Kazakhstan at Molineux.

== Style of play ==
Mfuni plays as a defender. Left-footed, he is known for his strength and aerial ability.

== Career statistics ==
As of match played 21 November 2026

Appearances and goals by club, season and competition
Club	Season	League			FA Cup		EFL Cup		Europe		Other		Total	
Club	Season	Division	Apps	Goals	Apps	Goals	Apps	Goals	Apps	Goals	Apps	Goals	Apps	Goals
Manchester City	2025–26	Premier League	0	0	1	0	0	0	0	0	—		1	0
Watford (loan)	2025–26	EFL Championship	8	0	—		—		—		—		8	0
Coventry City (loan)	2026–27	Premier League	6	1	0	0	1	0	—		—		7	1
Career total			14	1	1	0	1	0	0	0	0	0	16	1

== Honours ==
Manchester City U18

- FA Youth Cup: 2023–24

Manchester City

- EFL Cup: 2025–26
