= Harry Ibbitson =

English footballer (born 2005)

Personal information
- Full name: Harry Joe Ibbitson
- Date of birth: 18 December 2005 (age 20)
- Position: Forward

Team information
- Current team: Bradford City
- Number: 29

Youth career
- 2021–2024: Bradford City

Senior career*
Years	Team	Apps	(Gls)
2024–	Bradford City	0	(0)
2024	→ Kidderminster Harriers (loan)	4	(0)
2025	→ Guiseley (loan)	5	(0)
2025–2026	→ Chorley (loan)	38	(4)
- * Club domestic league appearances and goals as of 20:50, 20 April 2026 (UTC)

Harry Joe Ibbitson (born 18 December 2005) is an English professional footballer who plays for Bradford City as a forward.

== Career ==
Ibbitson began his career with Bradford City, and was their first ever player to move from the Development Programme to the Academy in 2021. At the end of the 2023–24 season, after a prolific campaign for the under-18s, he was close to joining the first-team squad, but did not due to illness. He was also linked with a transfer away from the club at that time. He turned professional in May 2024.

In September 2024, he moved on loan to Kidderminster Harriers for six weeks. After his return to Bradford, Ibbitson's character was praised by manager Graham Alexander following the loan experience.

In January 2025 he signed on loan for Guiseley. The loan was extended in February 2025, although Ibbitson was recalled within a few days, to make his Bradford City debut on 18 February 2025, appearing as a late substitute in the EFL Trophy semi-final defeat against Birmingham City.

He had his contract extended by Bradford City at the end of the 2024–25 season. In August 2025 he moved on loan to Chorley for an initial month. The loan was extended in September, for a further two months. Ibbitson said he was learning from Bradford's experienced players, such as Andy Cook and Stephen Humphrys, whilst training with the first-team.

In November 2025 he signed a new contact with Bradford City, until summer 2027. Later that month his loan with Chorley was extended for a further month. In December 2025, the loan was extended for a further month.

Ahead of the 2026–27 season, Ibbitson was challenged by Alexander to challenge for the first-team. He made his Bradford City debut on 22 September 2026, as a substitute in the EFL Trophy, before making his first start for the club, in the same competition, on 6 October 2026.

In November 2026, he took part in an anti-vaping initiative.
