= Saul Fox-Akande =

English footballer (born 2006)

Personal information
- Full name: Hassan Saul Bloluwatife Zacharry Fox-Akande
- Date of birth: 13 May 2006 (age 20)
- Place of birth: Liverpool, England
- Height: 1.86 m (6 ft 1 in)
- Position: Forward

Team information
- Current team: Morecambe

Youth career
- Liverpool
- Morecambe

Senior career*
Years	Team	Apps	(Gls)
2024–	Morecambe	1	(0)
- * Club domestic league appearances and goals as of 23:47, 12 November 2024 (UTC)

Hassan Saul Bloluwatife Zacharry Fox-Akande (born 27 July 2006) is an English professional footballer who plays as a forward for National League North club Morecambe.

== Career ==
Fox-Akande turned professional at Morecambe at the end of the 2023–24 season.

== Career statistics ==
As of match played 27 January 2024

Appearances and goals by club, season and competition
Club	Season	League			FA Cup		EFL Cup		Other		Total	
Club	Season	Division	Apps	Goals	Apps	Goals	Apps	Goals	Apps	Goals	Apps	Goals
Morecambe	2023–24	EFL League Two	1	0	0	0	0	0	0	0	1	0
Morecambe	2024–25	EFL League Two	0	0	0	0	0	0	0	0	0	0
Morecambe	Total		1	0	0	0	0	0	0	0	1	0
Career total			1	0	0	0	0	0	0	0	1	0
