= David Lawley Wakelin =

David Lawley Wakelin is a documentary film maker. His work includes "The Alternative Iraq Enquiry", a documentary alleging that Tony Blair is a war criminal.

In May 2012, he interrupted the Leveson inquiry during Tony Blair's statement, alleging that Blair had been paid off by the American bank JP Morgan Chase for agreeing to take the United Kingdom into the Iraq war. Blair denied the charge. Lawley Wakelin was later fined £100 plus costs. Speaking on the steps outside the court afterwards, Mr Lawley-Wakelin revealed he had received messages of support from the Nobel Laureate Mairead Maguire and Archbishop Desmond Tutu.
