= Park View A.F.C. =

English football club

Coordinates: 54°54′28.7″N 1°26′17.5″W

- Full name: Park View AFC
- Founded: 2020; 6 years ago
- Ground: Riverside, Chester-le-Street
- Chairman: Lewis Pendleton
- Manager: John Gamble
- League: Northern League Division Two
- 2025–26: Northern League Division Two, 6th of 22
Home colours

Park View AFC is a football club based in Chester-le-Street, England. They are currently members of the Northern League Division Two and play at the Riverside, Chester-le-Street. From foundation until 2025, they were known as Chester-le-Street United.

== History ==
Formed in 2020, Chester-le-Street United entered the Wearside League Division One. In 2022, the club was admitted into the Northern League Division Two. They finished 12th in a 21-team division in their first season.

In December 2024, they announced a rebranding, to begin in the 2025/26 season, as Park View AFC. The rebrand reflects their partnership with Park View Academy of Sport, a school for 16–19 year olds offering specialist sports training.

== Ground ==
The club started the 2022–23 season at the Riverside, Chester-le-Street, but moved to Sunderland West End F.C. The club returned to Riverside, Chester-le-Street for the 2023/24 season.
