= Leon Chiwome =

English footballer (born 2006)

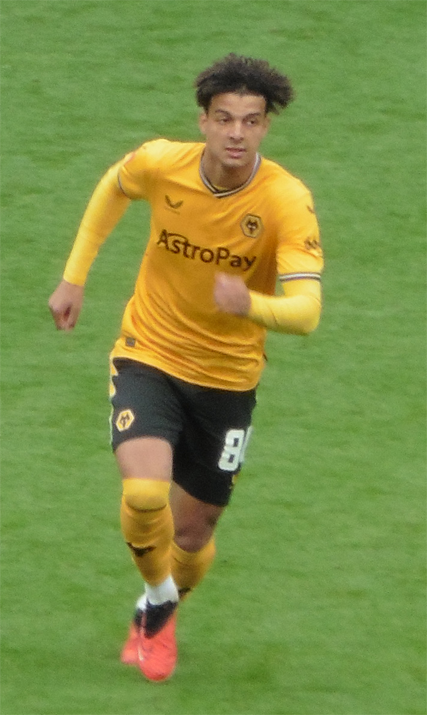

Personal information
- Full name: Leon Chiwome
- Date of birth: 10 January 2006 (age 20)
- Place of birth: Brighton, England
- Position: Forward

Team information
- Current team: Colchester United

Youth career
- Hassocks
- Plumpton Athletic
- Alfold
- 2022: AFC Wimbledon
- 2022–2023: Wolverhampton Wanderers

Senior career*
Years	Team	Apps	(Gls)
2023–	Wolverhampton Wanderers	3	(0)
2026–	→ Colchester United (loan)	0	(0)

International career^{‡}
2022–2023	England U17	7	(3)
2024–	England U18	2	(1)
- * Club domestic league appearances and goals as of 20:53, 28 December 2025 (UTC) ‡ National team caps and goals as of 10:32, 26 March 2024 (UTC)

Leon Chiwome (born 10 January 2006) is an English professional footballer who plays as a forward for EFL League Two club Colchester United, on loan from EFL Championship club Wolverhampton Wanderers.

== Early life ==
From Ditchling in Sussex, Chiwome played as a youngster for Hassocks F.C. in West Sussex and aged 14 years-old, Plumpton Athletic Football Club. He then played for Alfold F.C. in Surrey, and for Sussex Schools, when he was scouted by English Football League side AFC Wimbledon.

== Club career ==
Chiwome was in the academy at AFC Wimbledon before moving to Wolverhampton Wanderers as a 16-year-old in July 2022. He made his debut for Wolves U21 in Premier League 2 against Liverpool U21 in September 2022. He signed his first professional contract with Wolves in February 2023. He missed a large chunk of 2023 with injury, but returned to playing in the autumn of 2023.

On 16 March 2024, Chiwome made his professional debut for Wolves coming on as a second-half substitute in an FA Cup quarter-final defeat against Coventry City.

On 31 March 2024, Chiwome made his first Premier League start in a 2–0 loss to Aston Villa.

== International career ==
On 14 January 2023, four days after his 17th birthday, Chiwome scored a 48-minute hat trick for England U17 in a 6–0 win over Germany U17. He featured for England at the 2023 UEFA European Under-17 Championship in Hungary.

In November 2023, Chiwome was called up by Baltemar Brito to the senior Zimbabwe national football team for FIFA 2026 World Cup qualifying matches against Rwanda and Nigeria. However, he did not feature in the finalised squad for the matches.

On 22 March 2024, Chiwome made his England U18 debut during a 2–1 victory over Czech Republic in the U18 Super Cup at Pinatar Arena.

== Style of play ==
Wolves' academy manager Jonathan Hunter-Barrett has praised Chiwome's ability as a centre forward describing him as "big, strong and quick". He also described him as "very keen to learn and get on the ball, and he knows where the back of the net is." He was named by English newspaper The Guardian as one of the best first year scholars in the Premier League in September 2022.

== Personal life ==
Chiwome has a Zimbabwean father and a British mother. He was born in Brighton in Sussex.

== Honours ==
England U18s

- 2024 U18 Pinatar Super Cup

== Career statistics ==
=== Club ===
As of match played 16 March 2024

Appearances and goals by club, season and competition
Club	Season	League			FA Cup		EFL Cup		Europe		Other		Total	
Club	Season	Division	Apps	Goals	Apps	Goals	Apps	Goals	Apps	Goals	Apps	Goals	Apps	Goals
Wolverhampton Wanderers U21	2022–23	—			—		—		—		2 (Note: Appearances in EFL Trophy)	0	2	0
Wolverhampton Wanderers U21	2023–24	—			—		—		—		2	0	2	0
Wolverhampton Wanderers U21	Total		0	0	0	0	0	0	0	0	4	0	4	0
Wolverhampton Wanderers	2023–24	Premier League	0	0	1	0	0	0	—		—		1	0
Career total			0	0	1	0	0	0	0	0	4	0	5	0
