= Ronny Wakelin =

English footballer (born 2006)

Personal information
- Date of birth: 16 June 2006 (age 20)
- Position: Midfielder

Team information
- Current team: West Alabama Tigers

Youth career
- West Bromwich Albion
- Burton Albion

Senior career*
Years	Team	Apps	(Gls)
2023–2024	Burton Albion	0	(0)
2024-	West Alabama Tigers		
- * Club domestic league appearances and goals as of 16:53, 11 November 2023 (UTC)

Ronny Wakelin (born 16 June 2006) is an English professional footballer who plays as a midfielder for West Alabama Tigers, the soccer team of the University of West Alabama.

== Career ==
Wakelin spent time with the Academy at West Bromwich Albion, before joining Burton Albion. He made his first-team debut in the EFL Trophy on 7 November 2023, coming on as a 65th-minute substitute for Ciaran Gilligan in a 2–1 defeat at Doncaster Rovers.

== Style of play ==
Wakelin is an aggressive, deep-lying central midfielder.

== Career statistics ==
As of match played 7 November 2023

Appearances and goals by club, season and competition
Club	Season	League			FA Cup		EFL Cup		Other		Total	
Club	Season	Division	Apps	Goals	Apps	Goals	Apps	Goals	Apps	Goals	Apps	Goals
Burton Albion	2023–24	EFL League One	0	0	0	0	0	0	1 (Note: Appearance(s) in the EFL Trophy)	0	1	0
Career total			0	0	0	0	0	0	1	0	1	0
