= 2008–09 Grimsby Town F.C. season =

Grimsby Town
2008–09 season
- Chairman: John Fenty
- Manager: Alan Buckley (until 15 September 2008); Mike Newell (from 6 October 2008)
- Stadium: Blundell Park
- League Two: 22nd
- FA Cup: First Round
- League Cup: Second Round
- Lincolnshire Senior Cup: Runners-up
- Top goalscorer: League: Adam Proudlock (8); All: Adam Proudlock (8)
- Highest home attendance: 7,095 vs. Aldershot Town (28 March 2009)
- Lowest home attendance: 1,858 vs. Tranmere Rovers (12 August 2008)
Home colours	Away colours	Third colours

The 2008–09 season was Grimsby Town's 5th season in League Two. The club were still managed by Alan Buckley until September, when he was dismissed after poor pre-season and poor start to the club's League campaign. Mike Newell was given the job on a permanent basis after assistant manager Stuart Watkiss briefly took control of first-team affairs.

== Matches ==
=== Legend ===
Win	Draw	Loss

=== Pre-season and friendlies ===
Date	Opponent	Venue	Result	Attendance	Scorers
16 Jul	Corby Town	Rockingham Triangle, Corby	L 1–3	-	Bore
19 Jul	Oldham Athletic	Blundell Park, Cleethorpes	L 1–2	-	Hope
21 Jul	Winterton Rangers	West Street, Winterton	D 1–1	-	North
22 Jul	Gainsborough Trinity	The Northolme, Gainsborough	W 2–0	-	Till, Butler
25 Jul	Farsley Celtic	Throstle Nest, Farsley	L 0–3	-	-
30 Jul	Eastwood Town	Coronation Park, Eastwood	L 1–5	-	Jarman
4 Aug	Brigg Town	The Hawthorns, Brigg	D 1–1	-	North

The Mariners struggled to gel in pre-season, and it became clear the club would struggle in the league. Manager Alan Buckley included utilised his first team squad in the games against Corby, Oldham and Gainsborough, while a weakened side took a 5–1 drubbing by Eastwood Town.

Pre Season Top Scorers
Rank	Player	Goals
1	(England) North	2
=	(England) Bore	2
3	(England) Butler	1
=	(England) Hope	1
=	(England) Jarman	1
=	(England) Till	1
As of 22 July 2009

=== Lincolnshire Cup ===
Date	Opponent	Venue	Result	Attendance	Scorers
29 Jul	Lincoln City	Blundell Park, Cleethorpes	W 1–0	-	Bore
2 Aug	Scunthorpe United	Glanford Park, Scunthorpe	L 0–4	-	-

A late strike from Peter Bore gave a youth dominated Grimsby side the win against Lincoln City in the semi-finals, only to see another youthful side get be well beaten, in the next round by Scunthorpe United.

=== League Two ===
==== Results by matchday ====
Matchday	1	2	3	4	5	6	7	8	9	10	11	12	13	14	15	16	17	18	19	20	21	22	23	24	25	26	27	28	29	30	31	32	33	34	35	36	37	38	39	40	41	42	43	44	45	46
Ground	H	A	H	A	A	H	A	H	A	H	A	H	H	A	H	A	H	A	A	H	A	H	A	A	H	H	A	H	A	H	A	H	A	H	H	A	A	A	H	H	A	H	A	H	A	H
Result	D	L	L	D	L	L	D	L	L	D	D	D	L	L	L	W	D	L	L	W	D	L	L	W	W	D	L	D	D	L	L	L	L	L	W	L	D	L	W	W	D	L	W	W	L	D
Position	13	17	17	17	20	20	20	21	21	21	21	21	21	22	22	22	21	22	22	22	21	22	22	22	22	22	22	22	21	21	22	22	22	23	22	23	23	23	22	22	22	22	22	22	22	22

A = Away; H = Home; W = Win; D = Draw; L = Loss

Date	Opponent	Venue	Result	Attendance	Scorers
9 Aug	Rochdale	Blundell Park, Cleethorpes	D 0–0	-	-
18 Aug	Brentford	Griffin Park, Brentford	L 0–4	-	-
23 Aug	Chesterfield	Blundell Park, Cleethorpes	L 0–1	-	-
30 Aug	Lincoln City	Sincil Bank, Lincoln	D 1–1	-	Till
Sept 06	Gillingham	KRBS Priestfield Stadium; Gillingham	L 0–3	-	-
Sept 13	Chester City	Blundell Park, Cleethorpes	L 1–3	-	North
Sept 20	Morecambe	Christie Park, Morecambe	D 1–1	-	Till
Sept 27	Barnet	Blundell Park, Cleethorpes	L 0–1	-	-
4 Oct	Rotherham United	Don Valley Stadium, Sheffield	L 1–4	-	Boshell
11 Oct	Wycombe Wanderers	Blundell Park, Cleethorpes	D 1–1	-	Bore
18 Oct	Exeter City	St James Park, Exeter	D 0–0	-	-
21 Oct	Luton Town	Blundell Park, Cleethorpes	D 2–2	-	Bore, Bennett
24 Oct	Bradford City	Blundell Park, Cleethorpes	L 1–3	-	Trotter
28 Oct	Dag & Red	Victoria Road, Dagenham	L 0–4	-	-
1 Nov	Darlington	Blundell Park, Cleethorpes	L 1–2	-	Kalala
15 Nov	Bury	Gigg Lane Stadium	W 2–0	-	Trotter, Jarman
21 Nov	AFC Bournemouth	Blundell Park, Cleethorpes	D 3–3	-	Clarke, Bennett, Atkinson
25 Nov	Macclesfield Town	Moss Rose, Macclesfield	L 0–1	-	-
6 Dec	Port Vale	Vale Park, Burslem	L 1–2	-	Proudlock
12 Dec	Shrewsbury Town	Blundell Park, Cleethorpes	W 1–0	-	Proudlock
20 Dec	Aldershot Town	Recreation Ground/EBB Stadium, Aldershot	D 2–2	-	Kalala, Hegarty
26 Dec	Notts County	Blundell Park, Cleethorpes	L 0–1	-	-
28 Dec	Accrington Stanley	Crown Ground, Accrington	L 1–3	-	Proudlock
17 Jan	Wycombe Wanderers	Adams Park, High Wycombe	W 1–0	-	Jarman
24 Jan	Rotherham United	Blundell Park, Cleethorpes	W 3–0	-	Widdowson, Proudlock, Sinclair
27 Jan	Dag & Red	Blundell Park, Cleethorpes	D 1–1	-	Elliott
31 Jan	Bradford City	Valley Parade, Bradford	L 0–2	-	-
2 Feb	Exeter City	Blundell Park, Cleethorpes	D 2–2	-	Jarman (2)
10 Feb	Barnet	Underhill Stadium, Barnet	D 3–3	-	Bennett, Elliott, Forbes
14 Feb	Bury	Blundell Park, Cleethorpes	L 1–2	-	Proudlock
21 Feb	Darlington	The Northern Echo Darlington Arena	L 1–0	-	-
24 Feb	Morecambe	Blundell Park, Cleethorpes	L 2–3	-	Forbes (2)
28 Feb	Rochdale	Spotland Stadium, Rochdale	L 0–2	-	-
3 Mar	Brentford	Blundell Park, Cleethorpes	L 0–1	-	-
7 Mar	Lincoln City	Blundell Park, Cleethorpes	W 5–1	-	Proudlock (3), Akpa Akpro (2)
11 Mar	Chesterfield	Saltergate, Chesterfield	L 1–2	-	Bennett
14 Mar	Chester City	Deva Stadium, Chester	D 1–1	-	Hegarty
17 Mar	Luton Town	Kenilworth Road, Luton	L 1–2	-	Bennett
21 Mar	Gillingham	Blundell Park, Cleethorpes	W 3–0	-	Akpa Akpro, Hegarty, Conlon
28 Mar	Aldershot Town	Blundell Park, Cleethorpes	W 1–0	-	Conlon
4 Apr	Shrewsbury Town	New Meadow, Shrewsbury	D 1–1	-	Conlon
11 Apr	Accrington Stanley	Blundell Park, Cleethorpes	L 0–1	-	-
14 Apr	Notts County	Meadow Lane, Nottingham	W 2–0	-	Atkinson, Boshell
18 Apr	Port Vale	Blundell Park, Cleethorpes	W 3–0	-	Conlon (2), Jarman
25 Apr	AFC Bournemouth	Dean Court, Bournemouth	L 1–2	-	Jarman
2 May	Macclesfield Town	Blundell Park, Cleethorpes	D 0–0	-	-

=== FA Cup ===
Date	Opponent	Venue	Result	Attendance	Scorers
8 Nov	Morecambe	Christie Park, Morecambe	L 1–2	-	Stockdale

=== Football League Cup ===
Date	Opponent	Venue	Result	Attendance	Scorers
12 Aug	Tranmere Rovers	Blundell Park, Cleethorpes	W 2–0	-	Hunt, Chorley(O.G)
28 Aug	Blackburn Rovers	Ewood Park, Blackburn	L 1–4	-	Newey

=== Football League Trophy ===
Date	Opponent	Venue	Result	Attendance	Scorers
Sept 03	Chesterfield	Saltergate, Chesterfield	D 2–2	-	Jarman, North (Grimsby win 4–1 on penalties)
7 Oct	Scunthorpe United	Glanford Park, Scunthorpe	L 1–2	-	Hegarty

== League table ==
Brentford made a return to League One as champions, the second club to win the fourth tier three times since Doncaster Rovers. Exeter won their second successive promotion, and on the final day of the season managed to pip Wycombe Wanderers for the runners-up spot. Wycombe themselves managed the final automatic promotion spot by virtue of a single goal over Bury. The play-offs were won by Gillingham, who made an immediate return to League One after the previous season's relegation.

Several teams suffered heavy points deductions during the season. Rotherham were docked 17 points at the start of the season and Darlington 10 points later on. Without these penalties they would have both qualified for the play-offs, but instead managed only mid table. Bournemouth also suffered a 17-point deduction pre-season, and halfway through it looked to be enough to cost them their League status; however, a fightback under new manager Eddie Howe saw them climb to safety and secure survival with a game to spare.

Luton suffered the heaviest deduction however, and the loss of 30 points proved too much for them to survive. They suffered their third successive relegation and dropped out of the league, making them only the third English team to suffer three successive relegations, and the first to drop from the second tier to the Conference in successive years. The other relegated team was Chester City, who were statistically the worst team in the division and returned to the Conference after only five years. Grimsby would also have suffered relegation, if not for Luton's points deduction.

Pos	Team	Pld	W	D	L	GF	GA	GD	Pts	Promotion, qualification or relegation
20	Macclesfield Town	46	13	8	25	45	77	−32	47	
21	Bournemouth	46	17	12	17	59	51	+8	46 (Note: Bournemouth deducted 17 points for leaving administration without a Company Voluntary Agreement.)	
22	Grimsby Town	46	9	14	23	51	69	−18	41	
23	Chester City (R)	46	8	13	25	43	81	−38	37	Relegated to Conference National
24	Luton Town (R)	46	13	17	16	58	65	−7	26 (Note: Luton Town deducted 30 points; 20 points for leaving administration without a Company Voluntary Agreement, and 10 points for making illegal payments to agents.)	Relegated to Conference National

Source: The Football League
Rules for classification: 1) points; 2) goal difference; 3) number of goals scored.
(R) Relegated

== Coaching staff ==
Role	Nationality	Name
First-Team Manager (sacked 15/09/08)	(England)	Alan Buckley
First-Team Manager (hired 6/10/08)	(England)	Mike Newell
First-Team Assistant Manager	(England)	Stuart Watkiss
First-Team Coach	(England)	Brian Stein
Reserve Team Manager	(England)	Stuart Watkiss
Head of Youth	(England)	Neil Woods
Youth Team Manager	(England)	Neil Woods
Chief Scout	(England)	Brian Stein
Goalkeeping Coach	(England)	Steve Croudson
Physiotherapist	(England)	David Moore
Community Sport Coach	(England)	Gary Childs
Community Sport Coach	(England)	Graham Rodger

== Squad overview ==
Note: Flags indicate national team as defined under FIFA eligibility rules; some limited exceptions apply. Players may hold more than one non-FIFA nationality.

No.	Pos.	Nation	Player
1	GK	ENG	Phil Barnes (Departed in April 2009)
2	DF	SCO	Robbie Stockdale
3	DF	ENG	Tom Newey
4	DF	ENG	Ryan Bennett
5	DF	ENG	Matthew Heywood
6	DF	ENG	Richard Hope (Departed in February 2009)
6	MF	SCO	Peter Sweeney (on loan from Leeds United)
7	MF	ENG	Peter Till
8	MF	ENG	Paul Bolland
9	FW	ENG	Martin Butler (Departed in October 2008)
9	FW	ENG	Adam Proudlock
10	MF	WAL	Chris Llewellyn
11	MF	ENG	Danny Boshell
12	MF	ENG	Jamie Clarke
13	GK	ENG	Gary Montgomery (Departed in April 2009)
14	MF	ENG	James Hunt
15	DF	ENG	Matthew Bird
16	DF	ENG	Javan Vidal (on loan from Manchester City)
16	MF	COD	Jean-Paul Kamudimba Kalala (on loan from Oldham Athletic)
17	MF	ENG	Nick Hegarty
18	MF	ENG	Peter Bore

No.	Pos.	Nation	Player
19	FW	ENG	Danny North
20	FW	ENG	Andy Taylor
21	MF	ENG	Simon Heslop (on loan from Barnsley)
21	DF	ENG	Joe Widdowson (on loan from West Ham United)
22	FW	ENG	Nathan Jarman
23	MF	ENG	Grant Normington
24	MF	ENG	Liam Trotter (on loan from Ipswich Town)
24	FW	IRL	Barry Conlon (on loan from Bradford City)
25	MF	SLE	Malvin Kamara (on loan from Huddersfield Town)
25	DF	ENG	Rob Atkinson
26	FW	ENG	Tomi Ameobi (on loan from Doncaster Rovers)
26	FW	FRA	Jean-Louis Akpa Akpro
27	MF	FRA	Mickael Buscher (Departed in May 2009)
28	GK	ENG	Leigh Overton
29	DF	ENG	Bradley Wood
30	MF	NIR	Stuart Elliott (on loan from Doncaster Rovers)
31	MF	ENG	Dean Sinclair (on loan from Charlton Athletic)
32	MF	ENG	Adrian Forbes (on loan from Millwall)
33	GK	IRL	Wayne Henderson (on loan from Preston North End)
34	GK	ENG	Jonathan Lund
35	MF	ENG	Josh Fuller

=== Appearances & Goals ===
No.	Pos	Nat	Player	Total		League Two		League Cup		Football League Trophy		FA Cup	
No.	Pos	Nat	Player	Apps	Goals	Apps	Goals	Apps	Goals	Apps	Goals	Apps	Goals
1	GK	(England) ENG	Phil Barnes	37	0	32	0	2	0	2	0	1	0
2	DF	(Scotland) SCO	Robbie Stockdale	22	1	20	0	1	0	0	0	1	1
3	DF	(England) ENG	Tom Newey	29	1	24	0	2	1	2	0	1	0
4	DF	(England) ENG	Ryan Bennett	49	5	45	5	1	0	2	0	1	0
5	DF	(England) ENG	Matthew Heywood	22	0	18	0	2	0	2	0	0	0
6	DF	(England) ENG	Richard Hope	7	0	6	0	1	0	0	0	0	0
6	MF	(Scotland) SCO	Peter Sweeney (on loan from Leeds United)	8	0	8	0	0	0	0	0	0	0
7	MF	(England) ENG	Peter Till	21	2	16	2	2	0	2	0	1	0
8	MF	(England) ENG	Paul Bolland	0	0	0	0	0	0	0	0	0	0
9	FW	(England) ENG	Martin Butler	5	0	3	0	2	0	0	0	0	0
9	FW	(England) ENG	Adam Proudlock	29	8	28	8	0	0	0	0	1	0
10	MF	(Wales) WAL	Chris Llewellyn	32	0	28	0	1	0	2	0	1	0
11	MF	(England) ENG	Danny Boshell	28	3	24	3	1	0	2	0	1	0
12	DF	(England) ENG	Jamie Clarke	35	1	32	1	1	0	2	0	0	0
13	GK	(England) ENG	Gary Montgomery	0	0	0	0	0	0	0	0	0	0
14	MF	(England) ENG	James Hunt	27	1	22	0	2	1	2	0	1	0
15	DF	(England) ENG	Matthew Bird	0	0	0	0	0	0	0	0	0	0
16	DF	(England) ENG	Nick Fenton	0	0	0	0	0	0	0	0	0	0
16	DF	(England) ENG	Javan Vidal (on loan from Manchester City)	4	0	3	0	0	0	1	0	0	0
16	MF	(Democratic Republic of the Congo) COD	Jean-Paul Kamudimba Kalala (on loan from Oldham Athletic)	22	2	21	2	0	0	0	0	1	0
17	MF	(England) ENG	Nick Hegarty	39	5	36	4	1	0	2	1	0	0
18	MF	(England) ENG	Peter Bore	29	1	27	1	1	0	0	0	1	0
19	FW	(England) ENG	Danny North	18	2	15	1	1	0	1	1	1	0
20	FW	(England) ENG	Andy Taylor	9	0	6	0	2	0	1	0	0	0
21	MF	(England) ENG	Simon Heslop (on loan from Barnsley)	11	0	8	0	2	0	1	0	0	0
21	DF	(England) ENG	Joe Widdowson (on loan from West Ham United)	20	1	20	1	0	0	0	0	0	0
22	FW	(England) ENG	Nathan Jarman	37	7	33	6	1	0	2	1	1	0
23	MF	(England) ENG	Grant Normington	1	0	1	0	0	0	0	0	0	0
24	MF	(England) ENG	Liam Trotter (on loan from Ipswich Town)	16	2	15	2	0	0	1	0	0	0
24	FW	(Republic of Ireland) IRL	Barry Conlon (on loan from Bradford City)	8	5	8	5	0	0	0	0	0	0
25	MF	(Sierra Leone) SLE	Malvin Kamara (on loan from Huddersfield Town)	2	0	2	0	0	0	0	0	0	0
25	DF	(England) ENG	Rob Atkinson	32	2	31	2	0	0	0	0	1	0
26	FW	(England) ENG	Tomi Ameobi (on loan from Doncaster Rovers)	3	0	2	0	1	0	0	0	0	0
26	FW	(France) FRA	Jean-Louis Akpa Akpro	20	3	20	3	0	0	0	0	0	0
27	MF	(France) FRA	Mickael Buscher	0	0	0	0	0	0	0	0	0	0
28	GK	(England) ENG	Leigh Overton	0	0	0	0	0	0	0	0	0	0
29	DF	(England) ENG	Bradley Wood	0	0	0	0	0	0	0	0	0	0
30	MF	(Northern Ireland) NIR	Stuart Elliott (on loan from Doncaster Rovers)	11	2	11	2	0	0	0	0	0	0
31	MF	(England) ENG	Dean Sinclair (on loan from Charlton Athletic)	9	1	9	1	0	0	0	0	0	0
32	MF	(England) ENG	Adrian Forbes (on loan from Millwall)	15	3	15	3	0	0	0	0	0	0
33	GK	(Republic of Ireland) IRL	Wayne Henderson (on loan from Preston North End)	14	0	14	0	0	0	0	0	0	0
34	GK	(England) ENG	Jonathan Lund	0	0	0	0	0	0	0	0	0	0
35	MF	(England) ENG	Josh Fuller	1	0	1	0	0	0	0	0	0	0

=== Loaned out player stats ===
No.	Pos	Nat	Player	Total		League Two		League Cup		Football League Trophy		FA Cup	
No.	Pos	Nat	Player	Apps	Goals	Apps	Goals	Apps	Goals	Apps	Goals	Apps	Goals
3	DF	(England) ENG	Tom Newey (on loan at Rochdale)	2	0	2	0	0	0	0	0	0	0
7	MF	(England) ENG	Peter Till (on loan at Chesterfield)	15	0	15	0	0	0	0	0	0	0
18	MF	(England) ENG	Peter Bore (on loan at York City)	4	0	4	0	0	0	0	0	0	0

=== Scorers ===
==== All ====
Scorer	Goals
(England) Adam Proudlock	8
(England) Nathan Jarman	7
(Republic of Ireland) Barry Conlon	5
(England) Nick Hegarty	5
(England) Ryan Bennett	5
(England) Adrian Forbes	3
(France) Jean-Louis Akpa Akpro	3
(England) Danny Boshell	3
(Northern Ireland) Stuart Elliott	2
(England) Liam Trotter	2
(Democratic Republic of the Congo) Jean-Paul Kalala	2
(England) Danny North	2
(England) Peter Till	2
(England) Rob Atkinson	2
(England) Dean Sinclair	1
(England) Joe Widdowson	1
(Scotland) Robbie Stockdale	1
(England) James Hunt	1
(England) Tom Newey	1
(England) Jamie Clarke	1
(England) Peter Bore	1

==== League ====
Scorer	Goals
(England) Adam Proudlock	8
(England) Nathan Jarman	6
(Republic of Ireland) Barry Conlon	5
(England) Ryan Bennett	5
(England) Nick Hegarty	4
(England) Adrian Forbes	3
(France) Jean-Paul Kalala	3
(England) Danny Boshell	3
(England) Rob Atkinson	2
(England) Liam Trotter	2
(Democratic Republic of the Congo) Jean-Paul Kamudimba Kalala	2
(England) Peter Till	2
(Northern Ireland) Stuart Elliott	2
(England) Dean Sinclair	1
(England) Joe Widdowson	1
(England) Danny North	1
(England) Peter Bore	1
(England) Jamie Clarke	1

==== Domestic Cups ====
Scorer	Goals
(England) James Hunt	1
(England) Tom Newey	1
(England) Nick Hegarty	1
(England) Nathan Jarman	1
(Scotland) Robbie Stockdale	1
(England) Danny North	1

== Transfers ==
=== In ===
==== Pre-season ====
#	Player	From	Age	Fee
02	(Scotland) Robbie Stockdale	(England) Tranmere Rovers	28	Free Transfer
05	(England) Matthew Heywood	(England) Brentford	28	Free Transfer
06	(England) Richard Hope	(Wales) Wrexham	30	Free Transfer
10	(Wales) Chris Llewellyn	(Wales) Wrexham	28	Free Transfer
21	(England) Simon Heslop	(England) Barnsley	21	Loan

==== Mid Season ====
#	Player	Previous club	Age	Fee
06	(Scotland) Peter Sweeney	(England) Leeds United	24	Loan
09	(England) Adam Proudlock	(England) Darlington	27	Loan
09	(England) Adam Proudlock	(England) Darlington	27	Undisclosed
16	(England) Javan Vidal	(England) Manchester City	19	Loan
16	(Democratic Republic of the Congo) Jean-Paul Kalala	(England) Oldham Athletic	26	Loan
21	(England) Joe Widdowson	(England) West Ham United	19	Loan
24	(England) Liam Trotter	(England) Ipswich Town	20	Loan
24	(Republic of Ireland) Barry Conlon	(England) Bradford City	30	Loan
25	(Sierra Leone) Malvin Kamara	(England) Huddersfield Town	24	Loan
25	(England) Rob Atkinson	(England) Barnsley	21	Loan
25	(England) Rob Atkinson	(England) Barnsley	21	Free Transfer
26	(England) Tomi Ameobi	(England) Doncaster Rovers	20	Loan
26	(France) Jean-Louis Akpa Akpro	(Belgium) FCM Brussels	23	Signed
27	(France) Mickael Buscher	(Scotland) Gretna	21	Signed
29	(England) Bradley Wood	(England) Grimsby Town Youth Academy	18	Pro Contract
30	(Northern Ireland) Stuart Elliott	(England) Doncaster Rovers	30	Loan
31	(England) Dean Sinclair	(England) Charlton Athletic	24	Loan
32	(England) Adrian Forbes	(England) Millwall	30	Loan
33	(Republic of Ireland) Wayne Henderson	(England) Preston North End	25	Loan
34	(England) Jonathan Lund	(England) Leeds United	22	Signed
35	(England) Josh Fuller	(England) Grimsby Town Youth Academy	17	Pro Contract

=== Out ===
==== Pre-season ====
#	Player	To	Age	Fee
10	(Northern Ireland) Ciarán Toner	(England) Rochdale	27	Free Transfer
15	(England) Justin Whittle	(England) Harrogate Town	37	Free Transfer
16	(England) Nick Fenton	(England) Rotherham United	28	Free Transfer
19	(England) Gary Jones	Retired	33	Released

==== Mid Season ====
#	Player	To	Age	Fee
01	(England) Phil Barnes	(England) Gainsborough Trinity	30	Free Transfer
03	(England) Tom Newey	(England) Rochdale	26	Loan
06	(England) Richard Hope	Retired	30	Released
07	(England) Peter Till	(England) Chesterfield	23	Loan
09	(England) Martin Butler	(England) Burton Albion	34	Free Transfer
13	(England) Gary Montgomery	Retired to compete in cricket	26	Released
18	(England) Peter Bore	(England) York City	20	Loan

== See also ==
- List of Grimsby Town F.C. seasons
