= Nathan Jarman =

English football manager and former footballer (born 1986)

Personal information
- Full name: Nathan George Jarman
- Date of birth: 19 September 1986 (age 40)
- Place of birth: Scunthorpe, England
- Position: Striker

Youth career
- 1999–2002: Barnsley

Senior career*
Years	Team	Apps	(Gls)
2002–2007	Barnsley	15	(0)
2005–2006	→ Bury (loan)	2	(0)
2007	→ Worksop Town (loan)	13	(4)
2007–2010	Grimsby Town	47	(6)
2010–2011	Corby Town	22	(7)
2011–2012	Alfreton Town	49	(13)
2012–2013	Chester	42	(14)
2013–2015	North Ferriby United	74	(31)
2015–2018	Gainsborough Trinity	101	(28)
2018–2019	Mickleover Sports	32	(10)
2019–2020	Lincoln United	5	(0)
2020–2021	Frickley Athletic	3	(1)
2021–2023	Barton Town	9	(2)
2023–2026	Appleby Frodingham	96	(49)

Managerial career
- 2018: Gainsborough Trinity (caretaker)
- 2021–2023: Barton Town
- * Club domestic league appearances and goals

Nathan George Jarman (born 19 September 1986) is an English football coach and former professional player currently playing at Appleby Frodingham.

He played in the Football League for Barnsley, Bury and Grimsby Town, later playing in non-league football for Worksop Town, Corby Town, Alfreton Town, Chester, North Ferriby United, Gainsborough Trinity and Lincoln United.

== Career ==
=== Barnsley ===
Born in Scunthorpe, Jarman came through the youth ranks with Barnsley. He made his debut on 20 November 2004 against Oldham Athletic. In 2006, he played 2 games on loan with Bury, getting sent off on his debut. Jarman went on loan to Conference North side Worksop Town in February 2007. He played 13 times for the Tigers, scoring four goals. While his goal return was not as high as would have been hoped by manager Ian Bowling, some of his goals will live long in the memory of the Worksop fans. He marked his debut with a stunning overhead kick against Barrow and then added a 30-yard volley that crashed in off the post against Redditch. Jarman was eventually released from Oakwell at the end of the 2006–07 season.

=== Grimsby Town ===
In September 2007, Grimsby Town manager Alan Buckley brought Jarman to Blundell Park on a trial, following the advice of his assistant manager Stuart Watkiss, who had coached at his former club Barnsley. After a successful trial period, Jarman was rewarded with a one-month contract. Nathan managed to provide his fitness in the early part of the season in which he scored twice for the Reserves in four games. Jarman was sent off in his full Grimsby debut, away at Rochdale, but did enough in the remaining games to earn a one-year deal, as the Mariners stumbled to a disappointing season end. He was often only known to make a cameo role in first team affairs under Buckley, and was a regular sight on the Grimsby substitute bench.

He managed to score his first senior goal in a Football League Trophy tie at Chesterfield on 3 September 2008. The Mariners struggled in the early part of the 2008–09 season and Buckley was dismissed as the club's manager. In stepped Mike Newell as his replacement, and despite Grimsby's ongoing poor luck in the League, Jarman soon found himself a first team regular, this was mainly down to the release of want-away striker Martin Butler and on-going fitness problems with Danny North. This enabled Nathan to hold down a regular place in the first team squad, partnering fellow youngster Peter Bore up front for several weeks. Nathan scored his first league goal for Grimsby in the club's 2–0 away win over his former club Bury. This was The Mariners first league victory of the season. Jarman continued to feature in the first team, but due to the arrivals of new strikers Jean-Louis Akpa Akpro, Adam Proudlock and Barry Conlon, Jarman found himself relegated back to the bench, before Newell moved him on to the right side of midfield, a position which had become his regular position in the first team during the run in of the 2008–09 season.

Coupled with several injuries and new additions to the playing squad, Jarman would only manage to play a cameo role in first team affairs during the 2009–10 season. He had only made 7 league appearances between August and February, failing to score a goal. His most recent game for the club was in the 1–1 home draw with relegation rivals Macclesfield Town, in which Jarman came on as a substitute for Tommy Wright in the 80th minute, only to be shown a red card in the 90th minute. Having not being included in the first team for one reason or another was something that eventually boiled over within the player, and after several rants on the social networking site Facebook, Jarman's status updates had been shown to his manager Neil Woods. The latest reading from Jarman's Facebook account read "As if not being allowed to train with the first team wasn't bad enough – now I'm not allowed to play for the Reserves." Woods was asked if Jarman had played his last game for the club, in which Woods replied "Maybe", he also claimed that Jarman had been training with the youth team, and stated that the individual issues will be discussed at the end of the season, and for the moment he is looking for focus from his team who are involved in a second successive relegation battle. On 11 May 2010 Jarman had his contract terminated by mutual consent.

=== Non-League ===
After spending some of the summer being linked with Harrogate Town, Jarman signed a one-year deal with Corby Town

Jarman signed for Alfreton Town on 13 May 2011, he was regular in the side throughout the 2011–12 season, appearing 39 times and scoring 12 goals in the process. He aided Alfreton's late surge to safety as they avoided relegation to the Conference North division.

On 28 May 2012 it was announced that Jarman would drop down a division to sign with Conference North side Chester, the club formed out of the ashes of former Football League club Chester City. On 22 September 2012, Jarman became the first Chester FC player to score in the FA Cup since the reform of Chester FC from Chester City after the FA Cup second round qualifying 1–1 draw at Gainsborough Trinity. Chester would go on to win the league and earn promotion to the Conference National, but Jarman was transfer listed at the end of the year.

On 11 June 2013 Jarman signed for newly promoted Conference North side North Ferriby United., where he won the FA Trophy.

On 14 May 2015 Jarman, alongside North Ferriby teammate Matt Wilson, signed a 2-year contract with Gainsborough Trinity. Jarman will be remembered by the Trinity fans for scoring the only goal of the game in a 1–0 victory away at Wrexham in the 4th qualifying round of the FA Cup. Following the managerial appointment of Dominic Roma, Jarman was made first team captain. In May 2017 he signed a further one-year deal, taking a pay cut to do so, despite receiving more lucrative offers from other clubs. He became the club's caretaker manager on 8 February 2018 following the dismissal of Dave Frecklington.

Jarman joined Mickleover Sports ahead of the 2018–19 season.

On 31 May 2019, Jarman was appointed player/assistant manager of Lincoln United, with Steve Housham as manager. The two left the club in March 2020.

Jarman joined Frickley Athletic on 27 August 2020, reuniting him with former Trinity boss, Dave Frecklington.

== Managerial career ==
On 10 May 2021, Jarman was appointed as manager of Barton Town, hiring his former Grimsby teammate Danny North as his assistant.

== Career statistics ==
As of match played 16 December 2017

Appearances and goals by club, season and competition
Club	Season	League			FA Cup		League Cup		Other		Total	
Club	Season	Division	Apps	Goals	Apps	Goals	Apps	Goals	Apps	Goals	Apps	Goals
Barnsley	2004–05	League One	6	0	0	0	0	0	0	0	6	0
Barnsley	2005–06	League One	9	0	2	0	0	0	0	0	11	0
Barnsley	2006–07	Championship	0	0	0	0	2	0	0	0	2	0
Barnsley	Barnsley total		15	0	2	0	2	0	0	0	19	0
Bury (loan)	2005–06	League Two	2	0	—		0	0	0	0	2	0
Worksop Town (loan)	2006–07	Conference North	13	4			—				13	4
Grimsby Town	2007–08	League Two	7	0	0	0	0	0	1 (Note: Appearances in the Football League Trophy)	0	8	0
Grimsby Town	2008–09	League Two	33	6	1	0	1	0	2	1	37	7
Grimsby Town	2009–10	League Two	7	0	0	0	0	0	1	0	8	0
Grimsby Town	Grimsby total		47	6	1	0	1	0	4	1	53	7
Corby Town	2010–11	Conference North	22	7	3	2	—		0	0	25	9
Alfreton Town	2010–11	Conference North	10	1	—		—		0	0	10	1
Alfreton Town	2011–12	Conference Premier	39	12	3	2	—		3 (Note: Appearances in the FA Trophy)	3	45	17
Alfreton Town	Alfreton total		49	13	3	2	0	0	3	3	55	18
Chester	2012–13	Conference North	42	14	0	0	—		0	0	42	14
North Ferriby United	2013–14	Conference North	40	22	1	1	—		6 (Note: Four appearances and two goals in the FA Trophy: two appearances in the Conference North play-offs)	2	47	25
North Ferriby United	2014–15	Conference North	34	9	1	0	—		4	0	39	9
North Ferriby United	North Ferriby total		74	31	2	1	0	0	10	2	86	34
Gainsborough Trinity	2015–16	National League North	34	11	2	1	—		0	0	36	12
Gainsborough Trinity	2016–17	National League North	33	8	0	0	—		0	0	33	8
Gainsborough Trinity	2017–18	National League North	16	3	2	1	—		0	0	18	4
Gainsborough Trinity	Gainsborough total		83	22	4	2	0	0	0	0	87	24
Career total			347	97	15	7	3	0	17	6	382	110

== Honours ==
=== Barnsley ===
- League One play-off winners: 2005–06

=== Grimsby Town ===
- Football League Trophy runner up: 2007–08

=== Chester ===
- Peter Swales Shield Winner 2012–13
- Conference North Winner 2012–13
- Cheshire Senior Cup Winner 2012–13

=== North Ferriby United ===
- FA Trophy Winner 2014–15
