= Danny North =

English footballer (born 1987)

Personal information
- Full name: Daniel Jamie North
- Date of birth: 7 September 1987 (age 39)
- Place of birth: Grimsby, England
- Position: Forward

Team information
- Current team: Brigg Town (assistant manager)

Youth career
- 2001–2004: Grimsby Town

Senior career*
Years	Team	Apps	(Gls)
2004–2010	Grimsby Town	81	(17)
2010	Alfreton Town	5	(0)
2010–2011	St Patrick's Athletic	48	(22)
2012–2014	Sligo Rovers	59	(23)
2015–2016	Shamrock Rovers	32	(12)
2017–2019	Cleethorpes Town	49	(18)
2019	Lincoln United	15	(6)
2019–2020	Barton Town	11	(5)
2020–2021	Nunsthorpe Tavern	15	(14)
2021–2025	Barton Town	17	(6)

Managerial career
- 2023–2024: Barton Town
- * Club domestic league appearances and goals as of 08:29, 17 March 2023 (UTC)

Daniel Jamie North (born 7 September 1987) is an English football coach and former professional footballer who is the assistant manager of Brigg Town

As a player he was a forward, he started his professional career with home town club Grimsby Town in 2004 where he went on to break into the first team several years later. He departed Grimsby in 2010 and went on to play for Alfreton Town in 2010 before moving to Ireland with St Patrick's Athletic. In 2012, he transferred to Sligo Rovers where he remained for several seasons for before a spell with Shamrock Rovers. Since returning to England, North has played in Non-League football and has turned out for Cleethorpes Town, Lincoln United, and Barton Town.

== Early life ==
North attended Hereford Technology School in Grimsby.

== Playing career ==
=== Grimsby Town ===
North was a product of the Grimsby Town youth team and made the step up to the first team at the start of the 2004–05 season under Russell Slade. North made his professional debut for The Mariners in a 3–0 away defeat against Bristol Rovers in on 5 February 2005, when he came on in the 89th minute for Andy Parkinson. North, only made one appearance for The Mariners in the following season, against Mansfield Town. He scored his first professional goal on 10 February 2007 also against Bristol Rovers. Grimsby won that game 4–3. Town's new manager Alan Buckley began to include North in the first team setup and he completed his first senior hat-trick in a game against Barnet on 21 April 2007, where he scored a penalty in the last minute to put Grimsby 5–0 ahead at the end of the game. On 14 August 2007, North scored Grimsby's 7,000th goal in all competitions, in the League Cup tie at home to Burnley. In January 2008 North was named League Two Player of the Month after scoring 4 goals in 5 games. and he was the club's top scorer at the end of the 2007–08 season. His recent performances had earned him interest from higher division clubs including Leeds United. For the 2008–09 season, North struggled from fitness and injury problems from the start, and following the dismissal of Alan Buckley, he found himself out of favour with new manager Mike Newell. Newell had brought in several new signings such as Adam Proudlock and Jean-Louis Akpa Akpro, which eventually left North with only run outs in the reserves, even finding it hard to claim a place on the substitute bench. Following an impressive pre-season by the player, which was also coupled with injuries and suspensions to fellow strikers, North briefly won his place back in the team at the start of the 2009–10 season. On 13 January 2010, new manager Neil Woods made North available for loan. North was released by Grimsby on 1 February 2010.

=== Alfreton Town ===
On 17 February, North scored whilst playing for the Scunthorpe United reserve team in a 6–1 loss with the second string of Hartlepool United. On 1 April 2010 North joined Conference North side Alfreton Town until the end of the season. After seeing out the season with Town he left the club at the end of the season.

=== St Patrick's Athletic ===
In June 2010, North agreed to join Irish club St Patrick's Athletic until the end of the League of Ireland season in October 2010, taking the number 9 jersey previously worn by Alex Williams who left in the summer transfer window. He made his League of Ireland debut against Galway United in a 4–2 win on 2 July, coming on as a second-half substitute. On 5 July, he made his first appearance in a Dublin derby as a second-half substitute, a 2–1 defeat to Shamrock Rovers. North finished the 2010 season with seven goals, making him a popular figure with Saints fans.

North signed a new deal to keep him at St. Pat's for the 2011 season on 17 January 2011. He scored his first goal of the 2011 season away to Derry, a well struck penalty to secure a 1–1 draw for Pats on 21 April 2011. North scored his first goal in a Dublin derby on 25 April against Shamrock Rovers in the League Cup, coming on in the 70th minute and scoring a penalty in the 89th minute to level the score at 1–1. The Saints won 3–1 on penalties but North missed his spotkick. After his goals against Derry City and Shamrock Rovers, North scored against Drogheda United, Galway United and Bray Wanderers to take his goal tally to five goals in five games.

North continued his superb run of form with two vital goals against Sligo Rovers, and more very important goals against UCD, Derry City and Dundalk to increase his tally to 10 goals in 11 games. North won the League of Ireland Player of the Month and the St Patrick's Athletic Supporters Player of the Month for June 2011 after his goals against Derry City, Dundalk, Galway United, Bray Wanderers, two assists against Drogheda United and all round excellent play. He scored two goals against Galway United on 3 September and a goal against Killester United in the FAI Cup on 6 September. North scored another goal in the Dublin derby against Shamrock Rovers on 12 September after coming on from the bench and on 16 September he scored the winning goal in a 1–0 win against Cork City in the FAI Cup quarter-final. Danny topped a brilliant month by becoming a father for the first time on 20 September to daughter Mia-Grace. He opened the scoring in the Dublin derby away to Shelbourne in the FAI Cup semi-final at Tolka Park on 14 October 2011. North was part of the St. Pats side that won the 2011 Leinster Senior Cup after beating Bohemians 2–0 in the final at Dalymount Park, he set up Dave McMillan's goal to make it 2–0. North also won the Supporters Young Player of the Year after a season in which he scored 19 goals in 49 appearances in all competitions.

=== Sligo Rovers ===
North agreed to join Sligo Rovers for the 2012 season on 30 November 2011. He scored his first goal for the club against UCD on 10 March with a delicate lob over the advancing goalkeeper. After an impressive start to the 2012 season, which saw North become the league's top scorer, he then ruptured his cruciate ligament in a 2012–13 UEFA Europa League clash against FC Spartak Trnava which also saw North missing a penalty. Despite missing the rest of the season he still finished the season as the club's top scorer with 17 goals and earned a nomination for the PFAI Player of the Year.

He returned from injury in June 2013 coming on as a sub in an FAI Cup game in Waterford United. In July he came on as a substitute at Molde FK in a 2013–14 UEFA Champions League loss. North scored his first goal back in a 4–0 away win over Limerick. Despite not getting fit enough to get a sustained run in the team he made a dramatic sub appearance in the 2013 FAI Cup Final. He came on with 20 minutes left with Sligo trailing 1–0 and scored twice to put Sligo in front before then setting up a dramatic late winner for Anthony Elding. His contribution earned him the man of the match award and he was named SWAI/Airtricity player of the month for November. He ended the season with seven goals.

In the 2014–15 UEFA Europa League North scored in the victory over FK Banga Gargždai and in both legs against Rosenborg BK

Ahead of the 2015 season, North returned to train with former club Grimsby Town, scoring against Corby Town in a friendly victory.

=== Shamrock Rovers ===
North joined Shamrock Rovers on 20 November 2014 in preparation for the 2015 season.

=== Non League career ===
In the summer of 2017 North signed for Northern Premier League Division One South side Cleethorpes Town.

On 28 May 2019, North joined Lincoln United.

Barton Town confirmed on 24 December 2019, that North had joined the club.

In the summer of 2020, North joined Grimsby-based Nunsthorpe Tavern of the Lincolnshire League, playing in England's 11th tier.

== Coaching career ==
On 10 May 2021, North was appointed as assistant manager of Barton Town, under his former Grimsby teammate Nathan Jarman as manager. Jarman stated that North would also continue as a player. In 2023 North replaced Jarman as First Team Manager after Jarman was released by mutual agreement

== Honours ==
Grimsby Town

- Football League Trophy runner-up: 2007–08

St Patrick's Athletic

- Leinster Senior Cup: 2011

Sligo Rovers

- League of Ireland: 2012
- FAI Cup: 2013
- Setanta Cup: 2014

Individual

- Grimsby Town Young Player of the Season: 2006–07
- League of Ireland Player of the Month: June 2011, June 2012, November 2013
- St Patrick's Athletic Player of the Month: June 2011
- St Patrick's Athletic Young Player of the Season: 2011
