= Rob Atkinson (footballer, born 1987) =

English footballer

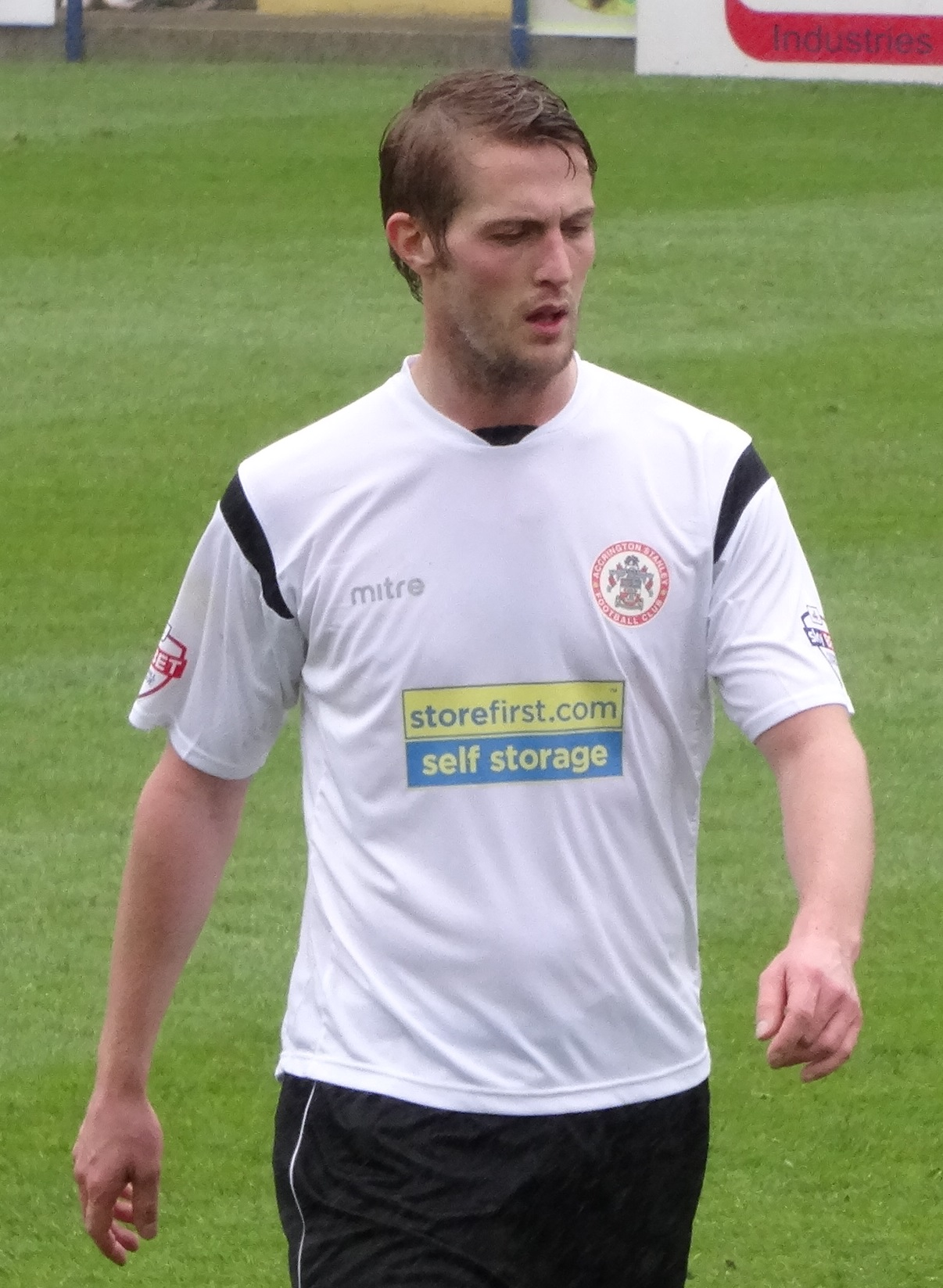
- Atkinson playing for Accrington Stanley in 2014

Personal information
- Full name: Robert Guy Atkinson
- Date of birth: 29 April 1987 (age 39)
- Place of birth: North Ferriby, England
- Height: 6 ft 1 in (1.85 m)
- Position: Centre back

Youth career
- –2004: Barnsley

Senior career*
Years	Team	Apps	(Gls)
2004–2009	Barnsley	8	(0)
2005–2006	→ Scarborough (loan)	22	(0)
2006	→ Halifax Town (loan)	4	(2)
2007	→ Rochdale (loan)	2	(0)
2007–2008	→ Grimsby Town (loan)	24	(1)
2008–2009	→ Grimsby Town (loan)	9	(1)
2009	→ Grimsby Town (loan)	1	(0)
2009–2011	Grimsby Town	83	(7)
2011–2013	Fleetwood Town	35	(1)
2012	→ Accrington Stanley (loan)	12	(0)
2013–2015	Accrington Stanley	59	(3)
2015–2018	Guiseley	72	(7)
2018	→ Bradford Park Avenue (loan)	8	(0)
2018–2019	Spennymoor Town	23	(3)
2019–2021	Grantham Town	11	(2)
Total		373	(27)

International career
2011	England C	2	(0)
- * Club domestic league appearances and goals as of 00:36, 7 November 2019 (UTC)

Robert Guy Atkinson (born 29 April 1987) is an English former professional footballer who plays as a defender.

Atkinson started his professional career with Barnsley in 2004, and then spent time on loan with Scarborough, Halifax Town, Rochdale and Grimsby Town. Following three loan spells with Grimsby he joined the club on a permanent basis in 2009 before signing with Fleetwood Town two years later. He later played for Accrington Stanley before dropping into Non-League football in 2015 and has since turned out for Guiseley, Bradford Park Avenue, Spennymoor Town and Grantham Town. He has also been capped twice by the England C football team.

== Club career ==
=== Barnsley ===
Born in North Ferriby, East Riding of Yorkshire, Atkinson has come through the youth ranks with Barnsley, making his debut on 6 March 2004. In the 2005–06 season he had a six-month loan spell with Scarborough playing 22 league games. He was also loaned out to Halifax Town during the 2006–07 season. After some impressive performances, Atkinson was recalled to Barnsley following injuries to first team players Bobby Hassell, Paul Reid and Antony Kay. Atkinson played his first full game for the Oakwell based club on Boxing Day 2006, in a 1–0 win over Burnley. In this game, Atkinson's performance earned him the man of the match award.

=== Grimsby Town ===
Rob Atkinson was initially signed for Grimsby Town on loan in November 2007 by Alan Buckley. He was drafted in as a covering defender, and was slotted in at centre back next to Nick Fenton. He scored his first goal for the club against Chester City on 1 January 2008. Atkinson went on to play he full 90 minutes at Wembley Stadium, in the Football League Trophy final defeat against MK Dons. Atkinson was singled out by Grimsby fans, as one of their more stronger players in the 2007–08 season, and in May 2008, Buckley revealed his desire to bring Atkinson back to the club on loan or possibly on a permanent deal. However at the time, nothing came of the transfer, and after Buckley signed centre backs Richard Hope and Matthew Heywood in pre-season, the Atkinson deal became dead in the water. On 31 October 2008 he re-signed for Grimsby on another loan deal, initially until January 2009. Town who were now managed by Mike Newell had signed Atkinson along with Jean-Paul Kamudimba Kalala, who was another former Grimsby player. Both transfers were made in the space of two days. Atkinson made his second debut for the club in a 2–1 defeat to Darlington when he came on as a substitute for skipper Matthew Heywood in the 30th minute of play. In January 2009 Rob's loan contract with Grimsby expired and he returned to Barnsley. However a day later he joined the club for a third spell, signing on an emergency loan deal to play the league fixture with Morecambe on 10 January. A deal was struck between Barnsley and Grimsby for a permanent switch that was completed two days later. Rob went on to cement a first team place at centre back alongside youngster Ryan Bennett, who had become the club's new captain, replacing Matt Heywood, who had been dropped due to poor performances. Atkinson and Bennett both were integral parts of the Grimsby squad that helped stave off relegation out of the Football League. During the 2009–10 season The Mariners suffered an eventual relegation, bowing out on the final day of the season.

Atkinson remained with Grimsby for the 2010–11 season, which was the club's first season in Non-League football in over 100 years. Following a pre-season injury, Darran Kempson, Scott Garner and Steven Watt shared out the two centre half positions until Atkinson returned and was preferred at the back alongside Kempson. He would also be appointed the club's interim captain when club captain Lee Peacock was not selected in the team, but would go on to depart Grimsby in the summer despite being offered a fresh contract by the club's new managerial duo of Rob Scott and Paul Hurst.

=== Fleetwood Town ===
Despite being offered a new contract with Grimsby, Atkinson opted to transfer to fellow Conference Premier side Fleetwood Town on 10 June 2011. In his first season with the club Fleetwood earned promotion to the Football League for the first time in their history. The following season Atkinson spent time on loan with Accrington Stanley but following a managerial change at Fleetwood he returned to the club and briefly captained the side. It was announced on 7 May 2013, that Fleetwood would not be offering the defender a new contract, and would therefore be released.

=== Accrington Stanley ===
On 16 July 2013 Atkinson returned to Accrington, penning a two-year deal.

=== Non-League ===
Atkinson joined Guiseley following his release from Stanley. In February 2018 he joined Bradford Park Avenue.

On 1 July 2018 Atkinson signed for National League North side Spennymoor Town. He left the club by the end of the season.

On 3 July 2019, Atkinson joined Grantham Town on a free agent.

== International career ==
On 24 January 2011, Atkinson was called up to the England C squad. Atkinson was again called up for England duty to face Portugal on 19 May 2011 along with fellow Grimsby defender Scott Garner.

== Career statistics ==
As of match played 21 November 2017

Appearances and goals by club, season and competition
Club	Season	League			FA Cup		League Cup		Other		Total	
Club	Season	Division	Apps	Goals	Apps	Goals	Apps	Goals	Apps	Goals	Apps	Goals
Barnsley	2003–04	Second Division	1	0	0	0	0	0	0	0	1	0
Barnsley	2004–05	League One	1	0	0	0	0	0	0	0	1	0
Barnsley	2005–06	League One	0	0	0	0	0	0	0	0	0	0
Barnsley	2006–07	Championship	6	0	2	0	0	0	—		8	0
Barnsley	Total		8	0	2	0	0	0	0	0	10	0
Scarborough (loan)	2005–06	Conference National	22	0	0	0	—		0	0	22	0
Halifax Town (loan)	2006–07	Conference National	4	2	0	0	—		0	0	4	2
Rochdale (loan)	2007–08	League Two	2	0	0	0	0	0	0	0	2	0
Grimsby Town (loan)	2007–08	League Two	24	1	1	0	0	0	4 (Note: Appearance(s) in Football League Trophy)	0	29	1
Grimsby Town (loan)	2008–09	League Two	10	1	1	0	0	0	0	0	11	1
Grimsby Town	2008–09	League Two	21	1	0	0	0	0	0	0	21	1
Grimsby Town	2009–10	League Two	37	2	1	0	1	0	2	0	41	2
Grimsby Town	2010–11	Conference Premier	25	4	2	0	—		2 (Note: Appearances in FA Trophy)	0	29	4
Grimsby Town	Total		83	7	3	0	1	0	4	0	91	7
Fleetwood Town	2011–12	Conference Premier	17	1	0	0	—		0	0	17	1
Fleetwood Town	2012–13	League Two	18	0	—		0	0	1	0	19	0
Fleetwood Town	Total		35	1	0	0	0	0	1	0	36	1
Accrington Stanley (loan)	2012–13	League Two	12	0	1	0	0	0	—		13	0
Accrington Stanley	2013–14	League Two	15	0	0	0	2	0	1	0	18	0
Accrington Stanley	2014–15	League Two	44	3	4	0	1	0	1	0	50	3
Accrington Stanley	Total		59	3	4	0	3	0	2	0	68	3
Guiseley	2015–16	National League	38	5	1	0	—		2	0	41	5
Guiseley	2016–17	National League	23	2	2	0	—		0	0	25	2
Guiseley	2017–18	National League	11	0	0	0	—		0	0	11	0
Guiseley	Total		72	7	3	0	0	0	2	0	77	7
Career total			331	22	15	0	4	0	13	0	363	22

== Honours ==
Grimsby Town

- Football League Trophy runner-up: 2007–08

Fleetwood Town

- Conference Premier: 2011–12
