= Ryan Bennett =

English former footballer (born 1990)

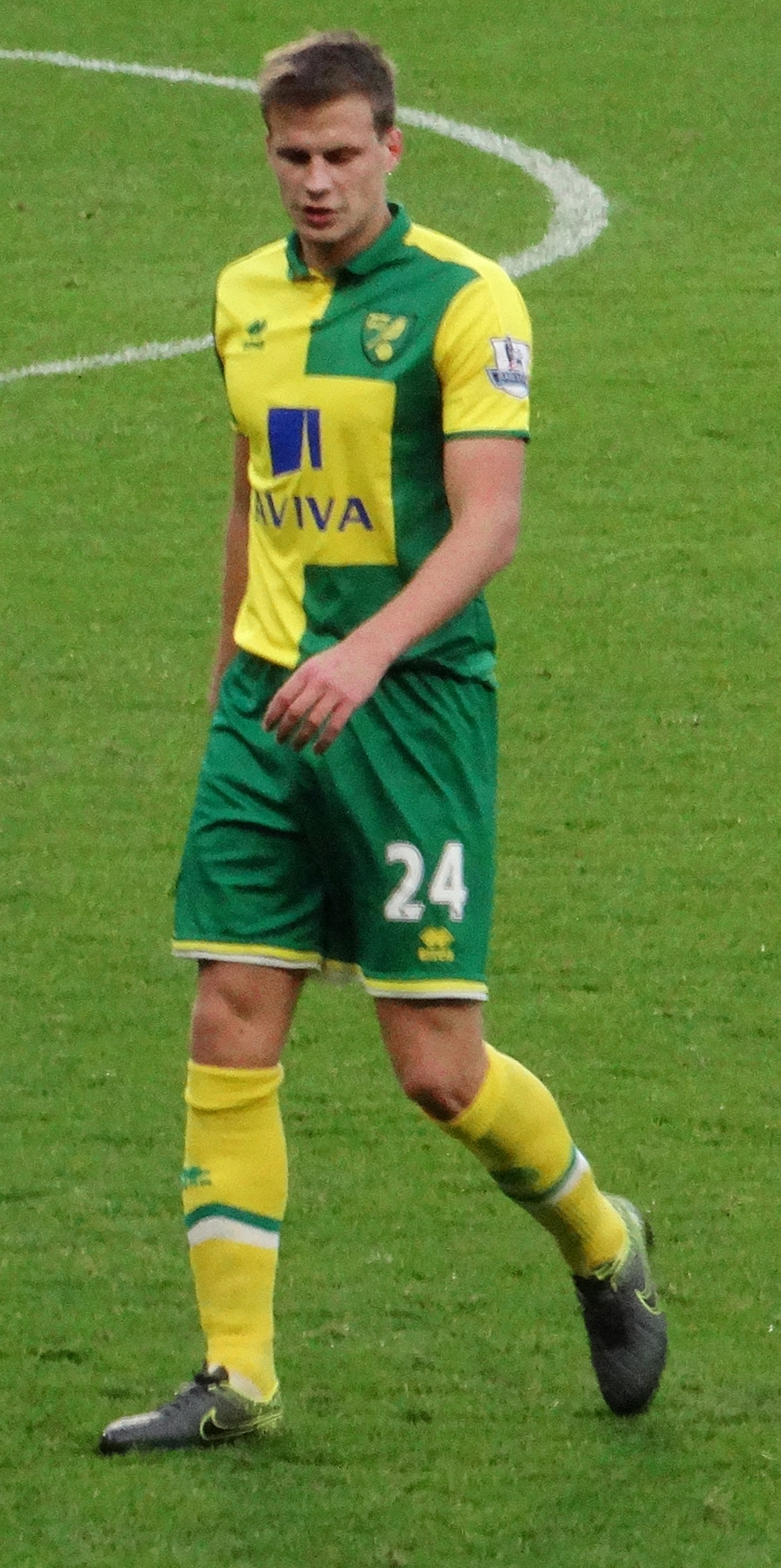
- Bennett playing for Norwich City in 2015

Personal information
- Full name: Ryan Bennett
- Date of birth: 6 March 1990 (age 36)
- Place of birth: Orsett, England
- Height: 6 ft 2 in (1.88 m)
- Position: Centre back

Team information
- Current team: Grimsby Town (Player Recruitment Lead)

Youth career
- 1996–2006: Ipswich Town
- 2006–2007: Grimsby Town

Senior career*
Years	Team	Apps	(Gls)
2007–2010	Grimsby Town	103	(6)
2009–2010	→ Peterborough United (loan)	10	(1)
2010–2012	Peterborough United	74	(5)
2012–2017	Norwich City	101	(2)
2012	→ Peterborough United (loan)	4	(0)
2017–2020	Wolverhampton Wanderers	74	(2)
2020	→ Leicester City (loan)	5	(0)
2020–2022	Swansea City	46	(0)
2023–2024	Cambridge United	62	(1)
Total		479	(17)

International career
2008	England U18	1	(0)
2011–2012	England U21	2	(0)
- * Club domestic league appearances and goals as of 14:37, 27 April 2024 (UTC)

Ryan Bennett (born 6 March 1990) is an English former professional footballer who played as a centre back and is the player recruitment lead at EFL League Two side Grimsby Town.

He was a youth product of Ipswich Town but was not offered a professional contract and thus signed for Grimsby Town in 2006. He remained with Grimsby for a further four years in which he earnt international caps for England U18 as well as becoming the club captain at a young age. In his final full season, he scooped the board in the club's player of the season ceremony. Grimsby Town cashed in on him in 2010 by selling him to Peterborough United after an initial loan deal. Whilst with Peterborough he represented England U21s. Bennett went on to play in the Premier League with spells at Norwich City, Wolverhampton Wanderers and Leicester City before joining Swansea City in 2020.

== Club career ==
=== Grimsby Town ===
Bennett was born in Orsett, Essex. He came to prominence in 2006 when Grimsby Town's youth team manager at the time, Neil Woods swooped to sign him after he was let go by the youth setup at Ipswich Town. Initially joining the club as part of the youth team midway through the 2006–07 campaign, he was soon promoted to the first team, managed at the time by Alan Buckley. Bennett would make his professional debut as an 88th-minute substitute, replacing Danny Boshell in a 2–1 win over Milton Keynes Dons in April 2007. 21 days later he became the club's youngest ever captain, aged only 17 years old when Grimsby's all-time record appearance holder John McDermott passed him the skippers armband after being substituted in the local derby with Lincoln City.

In the summer of 2007 Bennett had re-established himself as one of the club's favoured centre backs, and in this he was handed the number 5 shirt for the coming season. He scored his first goal in professional football on the opening day of the 2007–08 season when his header from six yards opened the scoring in the 1–1 draw with Notts County at Blundell Park. He won the club's Player of the Month award in August. In that same season, Bennett largely was favoured in the place of club captain Justin Whittle in the heart of Town's defence, and he went on to play in the club's Football League Trophy final defeat to Milton Keynes Dons at Wembley Stadium. In May 2008, Bennett was given the "Supporters Young Player of the year" for the 2007–08 season.

With the appointment of Mike Newell as first team manager in October 2008, Bennett was handed the captain's armband for the remainder of the 2008–2009 campaign aged only 18. This was down to the fact that the new signing Matthew Heywood, who had also been designated the new club captain, had fallen out of favour following several unconvincing performances, and Newell had preferred a youthful back pairing of Bennett and Rob Atkinson to the veteran duo of Heywood and Richard Hope. Bennett was ever-present for the club during the 2008–09 season, and his consistently solid performances throughout a very difficult season for Grimsby saw Bennett win firstly the PFA Player of the Month for February, which would eventually be followed by several club accolades. He swept the board at the GTFC Player of the Year ceremony in May 2009, claiming the Supporters' Player of the Year award, Supporters' Young Player of the Year, as well as other minor awards. Newell made repeated reference to Bennett's professionalism and maturity, and his unflappable playing style in particular was impressive for such a young defender, whilst his height made him an asset at set pieces. Also, Bennett was described as comfortable on the ball.

On 13 May 2009, Grimsby were reported to have turned down a bid from Peterborough United after United's director of football Barry Fry publicly revealed that The Mariners had politely turned down a proposed move, mentioning that Grimsby said 'thanks for the interest but we wouldn't sell him for £1m'. On 13 June, United stepped up in their aim to sign Bennett, and offered Grimsby a largely superior offer to their previous one. Grimsby chairman John Fenty rejected the offer three days later mentioning that he did not feel it was in the club's best interest to let Bennett go. A week later Bennett confirmed he would be staying with Grimsby for the unforeseeable future by signing a new four-year deal to keep him at Blundell Park until the end of the 2012–13 season.

=== Peterborough United ===
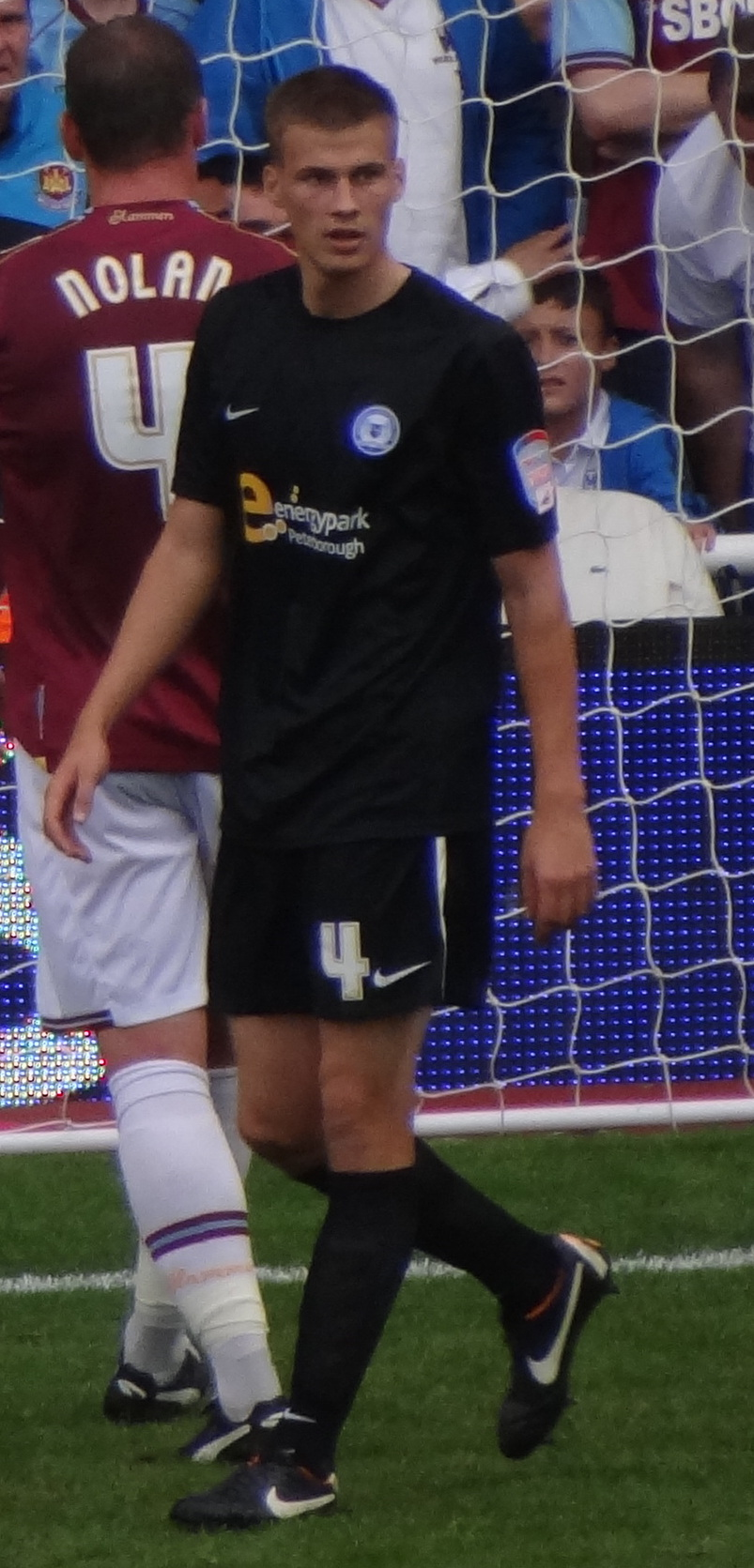
Bennett playing for Peterborough United in 2011

Bennett eventually did a U-turn and signed for Peterborough United on 23 October 2009 on an initial three-month loan deal with a view to a permanent move. Grimsby chairman John Fenty had a change of heart, and following a slow start to the season for his club, he decided to cash in on the Town skipper only days after sacking manager Mike Newell. Posh manager Darren Ferguson said of the transfer: "Ryan is an excellent signing for us, he has potential and fits in with our policy of bringing good, young players to the football club". Bennett made his loan at London Road permanent on 23 January 2010, signing a four-and-a-half-year contract, with Grimsby reportedly receiving £500,000, possibly rising to £1 million.

Bennett scored against Barnsley on 3 December, although Barnsley won 4–3. Bennett's final game for Peterborough was away at Doncaster; the Posh were 1–0 down in stoppage time until Bennett went down the wing and hooked the ball into the area for Tyrone Barnett who headed in on his debut after coming off the bench.

=== Norwich City ===
On 31 January 2012, Bennett signed for Premier League side Norwich City, for a reported £3.2 million. Club manager Paul Lambert said of the transfer: "I'm delighted we have signed Ryan. He's made a bright start to his career at Grimsby and Peterborough; he's an England U21 international and he's got so much potential." Peterborough United defender Gabriel Zakuani compared Ryan Bennett's move to Norwich to a "divorce". As part of the deal Bennett was immediately loaned back to Peterborough until the end of the month. Bennett was expected to sign for Swansea City and had begun the drive down to the Liberty Stadium only to be rung up and told to head for Norwich when the deal fell through. A 25% sell on clause meant that former club Grimsby Town earned for from the deal, with Grimsby chairman John Fenty revealing that Barry Fry had failed in an attempt to buy out the clause.

He scored his first goal for the club against Reading on 20 April 2013, which Norwich won 2–1. He was voted as Norwich's Man of the Match for his performance, and would proceed to also achieve that feat twice more in the following home matches against Aston Villa and West Brom, the latter of which his shot was deflected off Gareth McAuley after a Wes Hoolahan free-kick and into the net. Bennett scored his first goal of the 2013–14 season in a crucial home game against Hull City, where his 87th-minute header gave struggling Norwich a 1–0 victory. The goal eased pressure on manager Chris Hughton, who had recently been under-fire for a string of constant poor performances dating back to early 2013.

In May 2017, it was announced that Bennett would be released when his contract expired.

=== Wolverhampton Wanderers ===
On 31 May 2017, he signed a three-year deal with Wolverhampton Wanderers. Bennett scored his first goal for Wolves when he scored a last minute winner against Bristol City on 30 December 2017. On 14 December 2018, it was announced that Bennett had extended his contract with Wolves until June 2021.

On 19 January 2019, Bennett scored his debut Premier League goal for Wolves, a header from a João Moutinho corner, in a 4–3 victory over Leicester City at Molineux. This goal was the first goal for Wolves scored by an Englishman in the Premier League since Matt Jarvis scored in a 3–2 defeat to Wigan Athletic on 13 May 2012.

On 7 April 2019, Bennett made his debut appearance in an FA Cup semi-final (as a second-half substitute), as Wolves lost 2–3 to Watford at Wembley after extra time.

On 25 July 2019, Bennett made his debut appearance in UEFA European competition, playing the full 90 minutes of Wolves's Europa League Qualifying Second Round First Leg match against Crusaders of Northern Ireland. In the return leg on 1 August 2019, Bennett scored both for Wolves and an own-goal for Crusaders.

==== Leicester City (loan) ====
On 31 January 2020, Bennett signed for Leicester City on a loan deal until the end of the 2019–20 season, with an option to buy for £5 million at the end of the loan. Bennett was brought to the King Power Stadium by Brendan Rodgers to provide competition for Jonny Evans and Çağlar Söyüncü. He made his Leicester debut as a half-time substitute against Crystal Palace on 4 July 2020.

=== Swansea City ===
Bennett joined Swansea City on a permanent deal on 16 October 2020.

Despite initially being a first team regular with Swansea, by March 2022, Bennett had fallen out of favour at Swansea, his manager Russell Martin announced that consistency of other players and the loan signing of Finley Burns from Manchester City had pushed him down the pecking order.

On 1 September 2022, Bennett was released by mutual consent.

On 23 September 2022, Grimsby Town boss Paul Hurst said he would not rule out Bennett re-joining the club after he had begun training with the club again following his release by Swansea.

=== Cambridge United ===
On 6 January 2023, Bennett signed a six-month contract with EFL League One club Cambridge United. He was voted as Cambridge's Player of the Month for March 2023.

At the end of the 2022–23 season, Cambridge announced that they had offered Bennett a new contract for the 2023–2024 season.

Amid speculation of a return to Grimsby Town following news that he had recently taken up residence in the local area, a transfer never materialised and on 3 July, Cambridge announced they had reached an agreement for Bennett to sign a new one-year deal.

On 1 May 2024, Cambridge announced the player would be released at the end of his contract.

In an interview with the Pink Un, Bennett said he is "done with playing" and outlined his ambitions to be a sporting director.

== International career ==
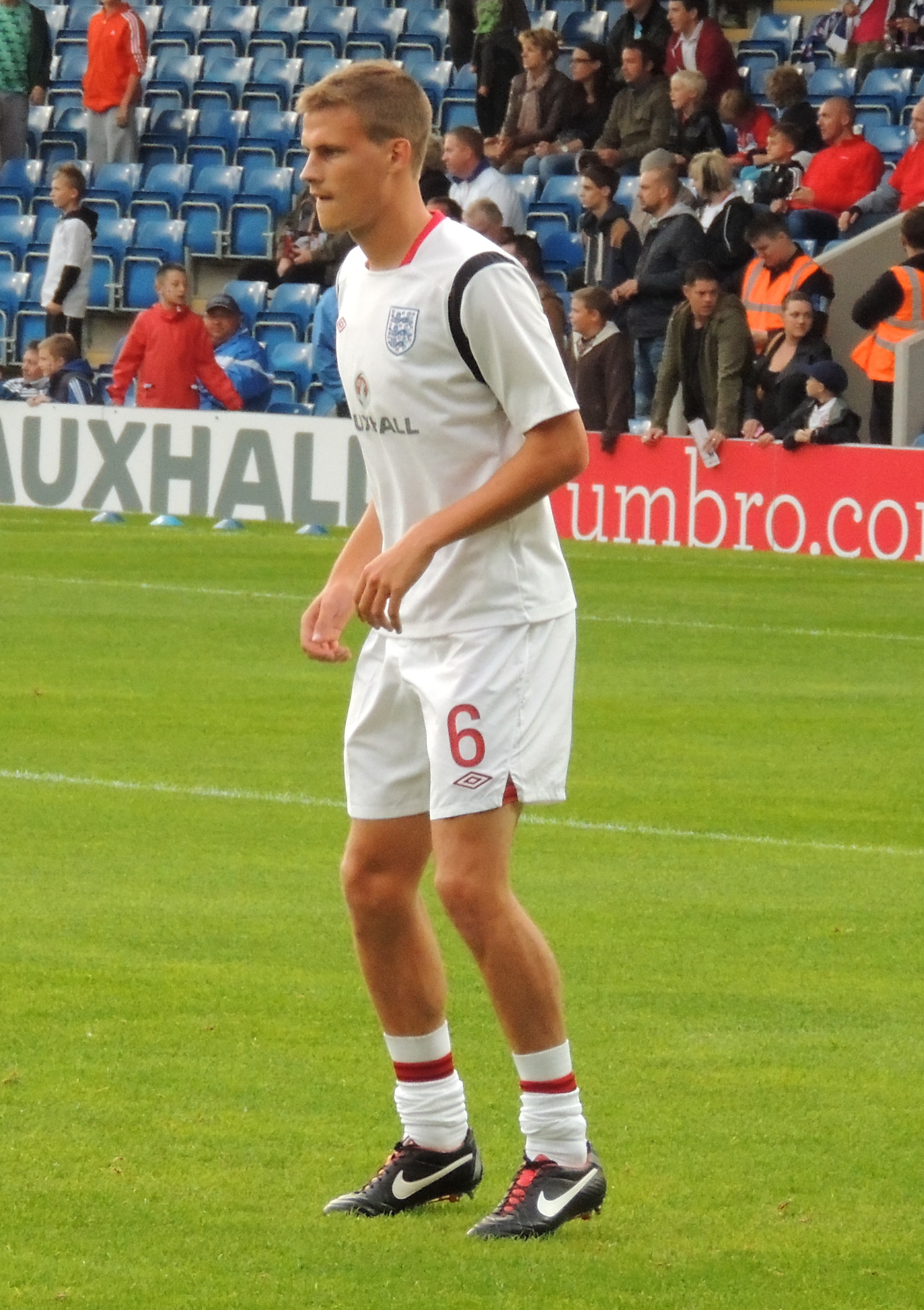
Bennett warming up for the England under-21 team in 2012

Bennett was called up for the England national under-18 team that faced Austria at Victoria Park on 16 April 2008. It was his first England call-up. He played the full game in the 2–0 victory. On 29 September 2011, Bennett was called up to the under-21 team for the first time by Stuart Pearce. He made his debut in a 2–1 win away to Norway on 10 October 2011.

== Coaching career ==
Following his departure from Cambridge United in 2024, Bennett retired from professional football. He subsequently stated that he wanted to remain in football and pursue a career in recruitment and as a sporting director.

Bennett undertook qualifications relating to scouting, data analysis and football administration, including Football Association Talent Identification qualifications and a Sporting Directorship Diploma delivered by the PFA Business School and the University of Portsmouth. He also obtained a UEFA B Licence and undertook work in scouting, recruitment and individual player development.

Bennett subsequently gained experience in scouting and player recruitment with Brentford and Luton Town. He worked for Luton in a consultancy role during the 2025–26 season, later confirming that the position had concluded at the end of the campaign.

In November 2026, Bennett returned to Grimsby Town when he was appointed the club's Player Recruitment Lead. The appointment brought him back to the club where he had begun his professional playing career in 2007.

== Career statistics ==
As of match played 27 April 2024

Appearances and goals by club, season and competition
Club	Season	League			FA Cup		League Cup		Other		Total	
Club	Season	Division	Apps	Goals	Apps	Goals	Apps	Goals	Apps	Goals	Apps	Goals
Grimsby Town	2006–07	League Two	5	0	0	0	0	0	0	0	5	0
Grimsby Town	2007–08	League Two	40	1	3	0	1	0	4 (Note: Appearance(s) in Football League Trophy)	0	48	1
Grimsby Town	2008–09	League Two	45	5	1	0	1	0	2	0	49	5
Grimsby Town	2009–10	League Two	13	0	—		1	0	1	0	15	0
Grimsby Town	Total		103	6	4	0	3	0	7	0	117	6
Peterborough United	2009–10	Championship	22	1	1	0	—		—		23	1
Peterborough United	2010–11	League One	34	4	3	0	2	1	3 (Note: Appearances in League One play-offs)	0	42	5
Peterborough United	2011–12	Championship	32	1	1	0	2	0	—		35	1
Peterborough United	Total		88	6	5	0	4	1	3	0	100	7
Norwich City	2011–12	Premier League	8	0	—		—		—		8	0
Norwich City	2012–13	Premier League	15	1	2	0	3	0	—		20	1
Norwich City	2013–14	Premier League	16	1	1	0	3	0	—		20	1
Norwich City	2014–15	Championship	7	0	1	0	0	0	0	0	8	0
Norwich City	2015–16	Premier League	22	0	1	0	3	0	—		26	0
Norwich City	2016–17	Championship	33	0	2	0	2	0	—		37	0
Norwich City	Total		101	2	7	0	11	0	0	0	119	2
Wolverhampton Wanderers	2017–18	Championship	29	1	1	0	3	0	—		33	1
Wolverhampton Wanderers	2018–19	Premier League	34	1	5	0	1	0	—		40	1
Wolverhampton Wanderers	2019–20	Premier League	11	0	0	0	2	0	6 (Note: Appearances in UEFA Europa League)	1	19	1
Wolverhampton Wanderers	Total		74	2	6	0	6	0	6	1	92	3
Leicester City (loan)	2019–20	Premier League	5	0	0	0	0	0	—		5	0
Swansea City	2020–21	Championship	28	0	1	0	0	0	—		29	0
Swansea City	2021–22	Championship	18	0	1	0	1	0	—		20	0
Swansea City	Total		46	0	2	0	1	0	0	0	49	0
Cambridge United	2022–23	League One	21	0	0	0	0	0	0	0	21	0
Cambridge United	2023–24	League One	41	1	2	0	0	0	0	0	43	1
Cambridge United	Total		62	1	2	0	0	0	0	0	64	1
Career total			479	17	26	0	25	1	16	1	546	19

== Honours ==
Grimsby Town

- Football League Trophy runner-up: 2007–08

Peterborough United

- Football League One play-offs: 2011

Norwich City

- Football League Championship play-offs: 2015

Wolverhampton Wanderers

- EFL Championship: 2017–18
