= Peter Till (boxer) =

English boxer (born 1963)

Personal information
- Nationality: English
- Born: Peter Till; 19 August 1963 (age 63) Walsall, England
- Height: 5 ft 6 in (1.68 m)
- Weight: Lightweight

Boxing career

Boxing record
- Total fights: 52
- Wins: 30
- Win by KO: 14
- Losses: 21
- Draws: 1

Peter Till (born 19 August 1963) is an English former boxer. He was 5 ft 6 in and fought in the lightweight category. He was born in Walsall West Midlands.

== Career ==
Born in Walsall, West Midlands, Till's career spanned from 1985 to 1996 and saw him participate in 52 fights.

== Personal life ==
His son Peter Jr. is a footballer.
