= Peter Till =

English footballer (born 1985)

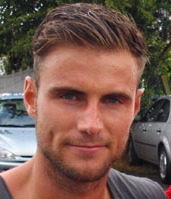
- Till in 2012

Personal information
- Full name: Peter Till
- Date of birth: 7 September 1985 (age 41)
- Place of birth: Walsall, England
- Height: 5 ft 11 in (1.80 m)
- Position: Winger

Youth career
- –2004: Birmingham City

Senior career*
Years	Team	Apps	(Gls)
2004–2007	Birmingham City	0	(0)
2005–2006	→ Scunthorpe United (loan)	8	(0)
2006	→ Boston United (loan)	16	(1)
2006	→ Leyton Orient (loan)	4	(0)
2006–2007	→ Grimsby Town (loan)	7	(0)
2007–2009	Grimsby Town	65	(4)
2009	→ Chesterfield (loan)	16	(0)
2009–2010	Walsall	28	(0)
2010–2011	York City	41	(4)
2011–2012	Fleetwood Town	18	(1)
2012–2013	Tamworth	31	(1)
2013–2014	Solihull Moors	18	(2)
2014	Leamington	12	(0)
2014	Halesowen Town	5	(0)
2014–2015	Stourbridge		
2015–2016	Stafford Rangers	17	(0)
2016–2017	Chasetown		
2017–2019	Walsall Wood		
2019	Alvechurch	4	(0)
2019–2021	Walsall Wood		

Managerial career
- 2019–: Walsall Wood
- * Club domestic league appearances and goals as of 06:30, 18 June 2017 (UTC)

Peter Till (born 7 September 1985) is an English former professional footballer who played as a winger.

He has played in the Football League for Scunthorpe United, Boston United, Leyton Orient, Grimsby Town, Chesterfield and Walsall. Till started his career with the Birmingham City youth system before making his first-team debut in 2005. He was loaned to Scunthorpe United, Boston United, Leyton Orient and Grimsby Town, whom he joined permanently in 2007. Till made an appearance at Wembley Stadium in the 2008 Football League Trophy Final and was loaned to Chesterfield in 2009. He was released after making over 80 appearances for Grimsby and subsequently joined hometown club Walsall. Being released after one season with the club, he joined York City of the Conference Premier in 2010. Till signed for Fleetwood Town a year later and won the Conference Premier title in his one season with the club.

== Playing career ==
=== Birmingham City ===
Till was born in Walsall, West Midlands. He came through the Birmingham City youth system after joining the club as a schoolboy and he signed a two-year professional contract on 4 July 2005. He was included in the matchday first-team squad on a few occasions during the 2004–05 season, with Academy manager Stewart Hall commenting "When he has trained and worked with the first team he has looked very good and he has had an excellent season in the reserves and looked a real threat". He made his debut as an 85th minute substitute in a 2–0 victory over League One team Scunthorpe United in the League Cup on 20 September 2005. Till was loaned to Scunthorpe United for a month on 5 October 2005 after being brought to their attention in the game weeks earlier, with manager Brian Laws commenting "I've watched him twice more since our game and I've liked what I've seen". His debut came two days later in a 2–0 victory over Tranmere Rovers. The loan deal was extended until January 2006 after Till impressed Laws. He returned to Birmingham on 9 January 2006, having made only 10 appearances for Scunthorpe due to injury and illness.

Till was loaned out again on 13 January 2006, joining League Two club Boston United. He made his debut a day later in a 1–0 victory at Chester City and his only goal came in a 3–1 victory over Bury on 21 January 2006. On 31 January 2006, the loan was extended until the end of the 2005–06 season and he finished his spell at the club with 16 appearances and one goal. Till joined League One club Leyton Orient on a one-month loan on 6 October 2006. His debut came the following day, making the starting line-up in a 0–0 draw with Chesterfield and he picked up an injury on his final appearance, a 3–1 defeat to Bristol City in the Football League Trophy on 1 November 2006. Orient opted not to extend Till's loan and his period at the club ended on 4 November 2006 with five appearances to his name.

=== Grimsby Town ===
Having failed to establish himself at Birmingham, Till joined Grimsby Town of League Two on an initial one-month loan on 23 November 2006. Tony Butcher of Cod Almighty described him as an "instant hit with wonderful wingery" on his debut in a 2–0 victory over Accrington Stanley on 25 November 2006. After impressing manager Alan Buckley during his loan at Blundell Park, Grimsby agreed a deal with Birmingham and offered Till a permanent contract. He eventually joined Grimsby on a two-and-a-half-year contract on 5 January 2007, having already made seven appearances for the team during the 2006–07 season. His first appearance following his permanent transfer was a 2–0 defeat to Chester on 9 January 2007. Till received the first yellow card of his career in a 1–0 defeat to Swindon Town on 17 March 2007 and he finished the season with 22 appearances.

His first appearance of the 2007–08 season came in a 1–1 draw with Notts County on 11 August 2007 and his first goal came in a 4–1 victory over Huddersfield Town in the Football League Trophy on 4 September 2007. He played six games and scored two goals in Grimsby's Football League Trophy run in the 2007–08 season, which saw Grimsby reach the final. Till started the game as Grimsby were beaten 2–0 by Milton Keynes Dons (MK Dons) at Wembley Stadium on 30 March 2008. He finished the season with 44 appearances and four goals.

Till started the 2008–09 season by playing in a 0–0 draw with Rochdale on 9 August 2008 and he scored in the local derby against League Two rivals Lincoln City at Sincil Bank in a 1–1 draw on 30 August. Till joined fellow League Two club Chesterfield on a one-month loan on 15 January 2009, having made 21 appearances and scored two goals for Grimsby up to that point during the season. He made his debut in a 3–1 victory at Chester on 17 January 2009 and in February the loan was extended until the end of the season after impressing manager Lee Richardson. Grimsby released him on 30 April 2009 and in retrospect he commented "It has been a wake-up call if I am honest. I have realised that I can't coast if I want to get to where I want to be. I have to give 110 per cent every day, not just in games". Till finished the loan at Chesterfield with 16 appearances.

=== Walsall ===
Till signed for League One club Walsall on a free transfer on a one-year contract on 23 July 2009 following a successful trial with the club. He commented "To be at my hometown club gives me an extra incentive to do well". His debut came in a 1–0 victory at Brighton & Hove Albion on 8 August 2009, in which he was substituted in the 88th minute. Till suffered a hamstring injury in September 2009, which allowed midfielder Mark Bradley to get a run in the team. After returning to fitness he made his comeback as a 74th-minute substitute in a 1–0 defeat at MK Dons on 10 October 2009 and started on his next appearance, which was a 2–1 defeat at Colchester United on 24 October. He picked up a minor injury in a 1–1 draw with Charlton Athletic on 2 February 2010 and he was able to feature in the next game, a 0–0 draw with Bristol Rovers. During Walsall's 2–1 victory at Leeds United on 16 February 2010 he picked up a hamstring injury and he returned to the team after entering a 2–0 defeat at Leyton Orient on 13 March as a 77th-minute substitute. He finished an injury-hit 2009–10 season with 30 appearances for Walsall before the club released him on 10 May 2010.

=== York City ===
Till signed a one-year contract with Conference Premier club York City on 29 June 2010 and following the move he said "I spoke to a number of clubs but this felt right. The gaffer made me feel really wanted so that was a key decision in coming". He made his debut in the opening game of the 2010–11 season as a 38th-minute substitute for Levi Mackin in a 2–1 defeat to Kidderminster Harriers on 14 August 2010. His first goal for York came in his next appearance after he scored the equaliser in a 2–2 draw at Bath City on 21 August 2010 after entering the game as a 74th-minute substitute. Till made his first start in a 3–0 victory against Altrincham on 28 August 2010 and he was substituted in the 82nd minute. He scored his first home goal with the opener as York beat Rushden & Diamonds 2–0 on 4 September 2010. He finished the season with 45 appearances and four goals.

=== Fleetwood Town ===
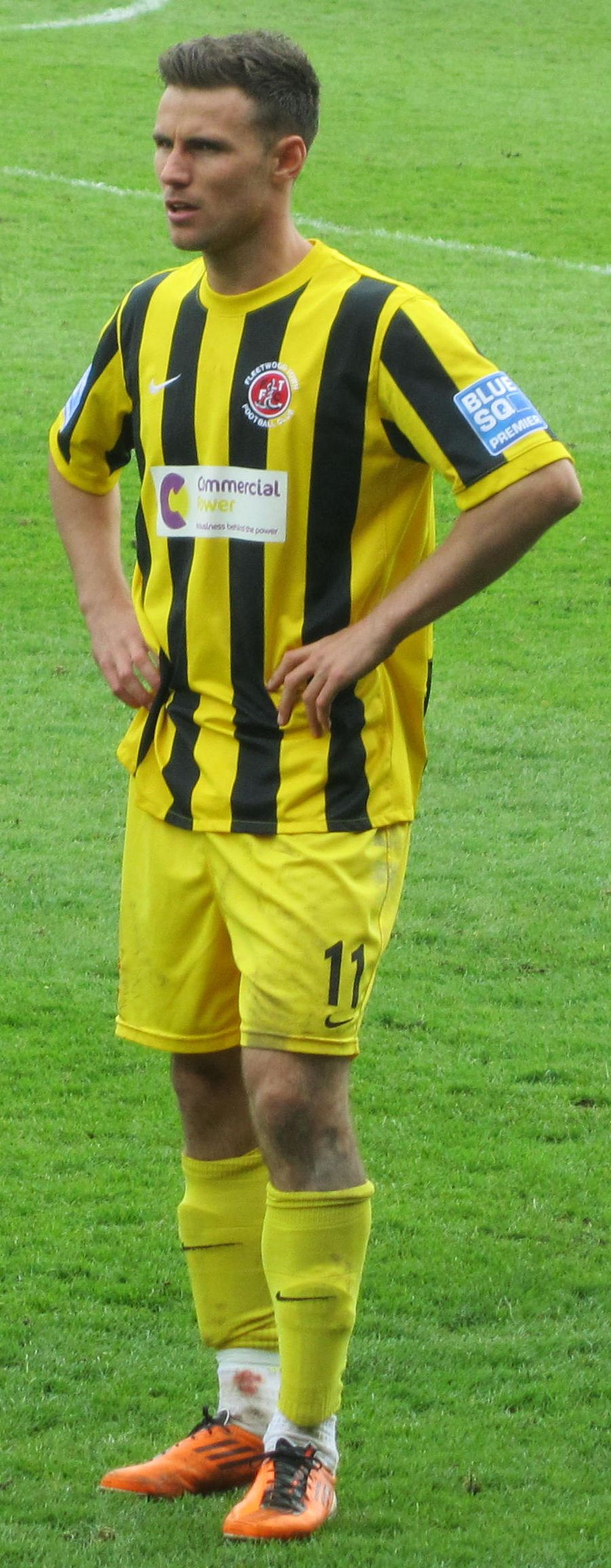
Till playing for Fleetwood Town in 2012

Till agreed on 25 May 2011 to sign for Conference Premier rivals Fleetwood Town on a two-year contract after the expiration of his York contract. Due to a knee injury, he had to wait until 12 November 2011 to make his Fleetwood debut, when he entered their 2–0 FA Cup first round victory over League One team Wycombe Wanderers as a substitute in stoppage time. Till finished the season with 22 appearances and one goal as Fleetwood won the Conference Premier title and thus promotion to League Two, before being released by the club after having his contract cancelled by mutual consent on 3 July 2012.

=== Tamworth ===
Till signed for Conference Premier club Tamworth on 19 July 2012. He made a scoring debut for Tamworth in the opening game of the 2012–13 season with the first goal of a 3–2 victory away at Hyde on 11 August 2012. He finished the season with 34 appearances and one goal.

=== Solihull Moors ===
Till signed for Solihull Moors of the Conference North on 6 June 2013.

=== Leamington ===
He signed for Solihull's Conference North rivals Leamington on 22 January 2014.

=== Later career ===
Till joined newly promoted Northern Premier League Premier Division club Halesowen Town on 12 June 2014. He made five appearances before signing for Halesowen's divisional rivals Stourbridge on 8 September 2014. He stepped down a division when signing for Northern Premier League Division One South club Stafford Rangers during January 2015. In July 2016, he left Rangers due to college commitments.

He then spent the 2016–17 season with Chasetown, another Northern Premier League Division One South club, before signing for Midland League Premier Division Walsall Wood. Till rejoined Darren Byfield as player-assistant manager at Alvechurch in 2019, but left in October to return to Walsall Wood.

== Style of play ==
Till plays as a winger on the left or right sides and his play has been described as "tricky". He has described himself as an old-fashioned winger, saying "I am very quick, very fit. I like to get at the full-back – an old-fashioned winger type, if you like. I like to cause the full-back problems and get my crosses in and link up with our full-back as well". Walsall manager Chris Hutchings described him as "an attacking wide-man with pace who is not afraid to take people on" in 2009. Till is also able to play as a striker.

== Personal life ==
His father Peter, Sr. is a former professional boxer.

== Career statistics ==
As of match played 26 August 2015

Appearances and goals by club, season and competition
Club	Season	League			FA Cup		League Cup		Other		Total	
Club	Season	Division	Apps	Goals	Apps	Goals	Apps	Goals	Apps	Goals	Apps	Goals
Birmingham City	2005–06	Premier League	0	0	0	0	1	0	—		1	0
Scunthorpe United (loan)	2005–06	League One	8	0	1	0	—		1 (Note: Appearance(s) in Football League Trophy)	0	10	0
Boston United (loan)	2005–06	League Two	16	1	—		—		—		16	1
Leyton Orient (loan)	2006–07	League One	4	0	—		—		1	0	5	0
Grimsby Town (loan)	2006–07	League Two	7	0	—		—		—		7	0
Grimsby Town	2006–07	League Two	15	0	—		—		—		15	0
Grimsby Town	2007–08	League Two	34	2	3	0	1	0	6	2	44	4
Grimsby Town	2008–09	League Two	16	2	1	0	2	0	2	0	21	2
Grimsby Town	Total		72	4	4	0	3	0	8	2	87	6
Chesterfield (loan)	2008–09	League Two	16	0	—		—		—		16	0
Walsall	2009–10	League One	28	0	1	0	0	0	1	0	30	0
York City	2010–11	Conference Premier	41	4	3	0	—		1 (Note: Appearance(s) in FA Trophy)	0	45	4
Fleetwood Town	2011–12	Conference Premier	18	1	4	0	—		0	0	22	1
Tamworth	2012–13	Conference Premier	31	1	0	0	—		3	0	34	1
Solihull Moors	2013–14	Conference North	18	2	0	0	—		0	0	18	2
Leamington	2013–14	Conference North	12	0	—		—		—		12	0
Halesowen Town	2014–15	Northern Premier League Premier Division	5	0	—		—		—		5	0
Stafford Rangers	2014–15	Northern Premier League Division One South	14	0	—		—		4 (Note: Two appearances in Walsall Senior Cup, two in Staffordshire Senior Cup)	0	18	0
Stafford Rangers	2015–16	Northern Premier League Division One South	3	0	0	0	—		0	0	3	0
Stafford Rangers	Total		17	0	0	0	—		4	0	21	0
Career total			284	13	13	0	4	0	19	2	320	15

== Honours ==
Grimsby Town

- Football League Trophy runner-up: 2007–08

Fleetwood Town

- Conference Premier: 2011–12
