= Scott Garner =

English footballer (born 1989)

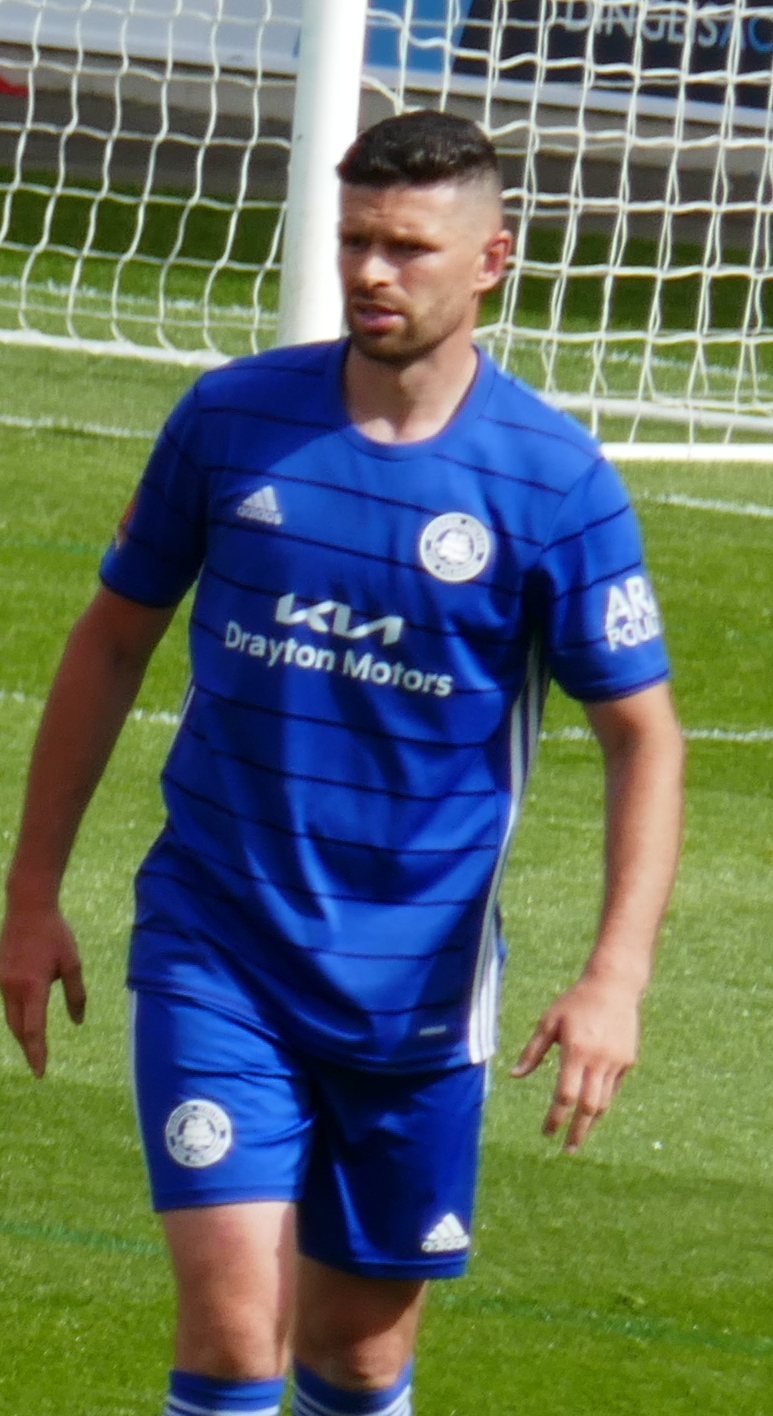
- Garner playing for Boston United in 2022

Personal information
- Full name: Scott John Garner
- Date of birth: 20 September 1989 (age 37)
- Place of birth: Coventry, England
- Height: 6 ft 2 in (1.88 m)
- Position: Defender

Youth career
- –2008: Leicester City

Senior career*
Years	Team	Apps	(Gls)
2008–2009	Leicester City	0	(0)
2008	→ Ilkeston Town (loan)	?	(?)
2009–2010	Mansfield Town	51	(6)
2010–2012	Grimsby Town	31	(3)
2011	→ Alfreton Town (loan)	9	(1)
2012–2014	Cambridge United	5	(0)
2012–2013	→ Lincoln City (loan)	15	(0)
2013–2014	→ Boston United (loan)	40	(7)
2014–2016	Boston United	85	(9)
2016–2018	FC Halifax Town	57	(3)
2018–2020	Guiseley	39	(2)
2020–2022	Boston United	45	(3)
2022	Alfreton Town	0	(0)
Total		377	(29)

International career
2009–2011	England C	2	(0)
- * Club domestic league appearances and goals as of 14:19, 23 June 2022 (UTC)

Scott John Garner (born 20 September 1989) is an English former professional footballer who played as a defender.

He has previously played for Leicester City, Ilkeston Town, Mansfield Town, Grimsby Town, Alfreton Town, Cambridge United, Lincoln City, FC Halifax Town and Guiseley.

== Club career ==
=== Leicester City ===
Born in Coventry, West Midlands, Garner began his career at Leicester City, signing a professional contract at the end of the 2007–08 season. On 21 October 2008, Garner was loaned, initially for one month and later extended, to non-league side Ilkeston Town, managed by David Holdsworth.

=== Mansfield Town ===
When Holdsworth was later appointed Mansfield Town manager, he signed Garner on a free transfer from Leicester on 8 January 2009.

Within his first few games for the Stags, Garner had won the Conference National Player of the Month award for January. In the four games he played over the month, Mansfield were unbeaten, conceding just one goal, with Garner scoring the winner in a 2–1 victory over Eastbourne Borough. A day after receiving the award, Garner was sent off for the first time in his career against York City. He captained the side, at the age of just 19, in a 2–0 win over Altrincham in April, scoring the opening goal.

In the 2009–10 season, in the absence of club captain Gary Mills, Garner regularly took over the captain's armband.

=== Grimsby Town ===
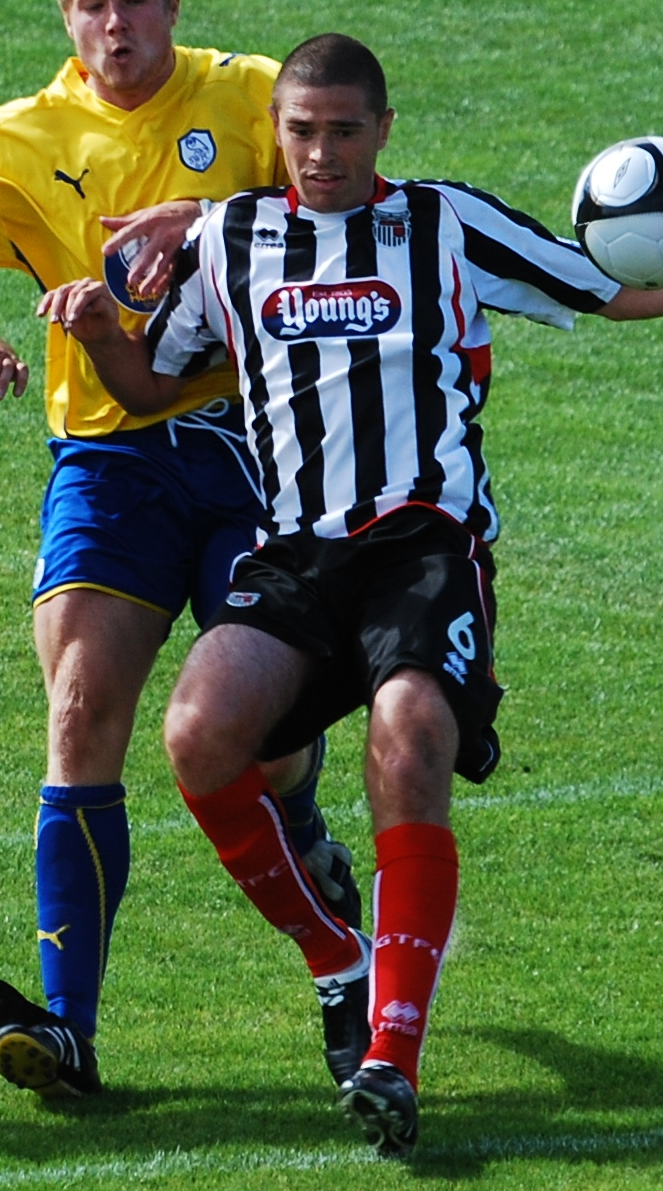
Garner playing for Grimsby Town in 2010

Garner signed for newly relegated Conference team Grimsby Town on a two-year contract on 7 July 2010. After struggling to make an impact at Grimsby he was loaned too Alfreton Town on 8 February 2011. On 29 March 2011, Grimsby's new managerial team of Paul Hurst and Rob Scott recalled Garner to the Grimsby team following a defensive injury crisis. After playing 31 times in two years, Garner was told on 27 April 2012 that he no longer had a future at the club and was subsequently released.

=== Cambridge United ===
Following his release from The Mariners earlier in the close season, Garner was offered deals by several clubs. On 13 June 2012, he chose to sign a two-year contract with Cambridge United. Having struggled to hold down a first team place at Cambridge, Garner joined Lincoln City on a two-month loan on 6 October 2012.

=== Non-League ===
In July 2013, Garner signed for Boston United on a long-term loan. He went on to play for FC Halifax Town before signing with Guiseley on 13 June 2018. Having returned for a second spell with Boston United in 2020, Garner joined Alfreton Town in June 2022.

On 2 August 2022, after completing pre-season with Alfreton, Garner announced he was retiring from football.

== International career ==
Garner was named in the England C squad to play Hungary under-23s on 15 September 2009. He captained the side in a 1–1 draw. He was also named in the squad to play Poland under-23's in November 2009, though club commitments at Mansfield prevented him from playing the game.

On 12 May 2011 Garner and fellow Grimsby defender Rob Atkinson were called up for England C duty to play against Portugal on the 19th.

== Career statistics ==
As of match played 25 November 2017

Appearances and goals by club, season and competition
Club	Season	League			FA Cup		League Cup		Other		Total	
Club	Season	Division	Apps	Goals	Apps	Goals	Apps	Goals	Apps	Goals	Apps	Goals
Mansfield Town	2008–09	Conference Premier	20	4	0	0	—		0	0	20	4
Mansfield Town	2009–10	Conference Premier	31	2	2	1	—		0	0	33	3
Mansfield Town	Mansfield total		51	6	2	1	0	0	0	0	53	7
Grimsby Town	2010–11	Conference Premier	17	0	2	0	—		1 (Note: Appearances in the FA Trophy)	0	20	0
Grimsby Town	2011–12	Conference Premier	14	3	0	0	—		2	0	16	3
Grimsby Town	Grimsby total		31	3	2	0	0	0	3	0	36	3
Alfreton Town (loan)	2010–11	Conference North	9	1	0	0	—		0	0	9	1
Cambridge United	2012–13	Conference Premier	5	0	1	0	—		0	0	6	0
Lincoln City (loan)	2012–13	Conference Premier	15	0	0	0	—		1	0	16	0
Boston United	2013–14	Conference North	40	7	0	0	—		2	0	42	7
Boston United	2014–15	Conference North	41	7	0	0	—		2	0	43	7
Boston United	2015–16	National League North	44	2	0	0	—		0	0	44	2
Boston United	Boston total		125	16	0	0	0	0	4	0	129	16
FC Halifax Town	2016–17	National League North	40	2	5	1	—		0	0	45	3
FC Halifax Town	2017–18	National League	17	1	1	0	—		0	0	18	1
FC Halifax Town	Halifax total		57	3	6	1	0	0	0	0	63	4
Career total			293	29	11	2	0	0	8	0	312	31
