= John Hope (footballer) =

English footballer

Personal information
- Full name: John William March Hope
- Date of birth: 30 March 1949
- Place of birth: Shildon, England
- Date of death: 18 July 2016 (aged 67)
- Position: Goalkeeper

Youth career
- –: Darlington

Senior career*
Years	Team	Apps	(Gls)
1967–1969	Darlington	14	(0)
1969–1971	Newcastle United	1	(0)
1971–1975	Sheffield United	63	(0)
1975–1976	Hartlepool United	23	(0)
1976–19??	Whitby Town		
- * Club domestic league appearances and goals

John William March Hope (30 March 1949 – 18 July 2016) was an English footballer who made 101 appearances in the Football League playing as a goalkeeper for Darlington, Newcastle United, Sheffield United and Hartlepool United. He also played non-league football for Whitby Town.

== Life and career ==
Hope was born in Shildon, County Durham. After leaving school, he worked for six months as a welder before beginning his football career as an apprentice with Fourth Division club Darlington. After 14 league matches, Hope joined First Division club Newcastle United in March 1969 for an £8,000 fee. Because of the form and fitness of Iam McFaul, Hope made only one appearance in a little under two years with the club. With McFaul on international duty, Hope kept goal in a 1–0 defeat away to Manchester City on 5 May 1969. As an unused substitute, he was part of the Newcastle squad that won the 1968–69 Fairs Cup. Hope did come close to a second appearance, in January 1970 when McFaul was unwell before a Fairs Cup fixture, but the latter recovered in time to play.

In January 1971, Sheffield United exchanged striker John Tudor for Hope and forward David Ford. Hope went straight into the starting eleven, replacing former England international goalkeeper Alan Hodgkinson. Of his home debut, in a 2–1 defeat of Luton Town on 6 February, the Guardian's correspondent wrote that he made some fine saves but "had a lot on his plate following the popular and long-serving Hodgkinson". He kept his place as Sheffield United went on to clinch promotion to the First Division at the end of the season, with a run of results that included seven consecutive clean sheets, a club record that stood until beaten by Mark Howard more than 40 years later. According to teammate Tony Currie, Hope "was a top line player who, like everyone else made a couple of mistakes, but because of his position they were highlighted more than the rest of us. John, though, had the heart of a lion. He was one of the bravest I've ever seen."

After Peter Shilton injured a finger, Hope received a late call-up to the England under-23 squad for a January 1972 fixture against Wales, but Phil Parkes, originally selected as substitute for Shilton, played in the match. Despite a poor performance in a 5–0 home defeat by Arsenal at the end of the month, coinciding with unfounded rumours about his lifestyle, Hope was in Sheffield United's team for the next League match, a 3–3 draw with Manchester City, and received a second call-up to the U23 squad, again as understudy to Parkes with Shilton injured. He kept the starting place for most of that season, but played relatively little thereafter. In January 1975, the Daily Mirror reported that Hope had been available on a free transfer for three months, no offers had come in for him, and although he would be willing to play part-time in order to remain in football, he was intending to give up the game and resume working as a welder. He spent the 1975–76 season with Hartlepool United in the Fourth Division, and then moved into non-league football with Whitby Town.

Hope had two sons who became professional footballers, both of whom played as defenders. Chris made more than 500 Football League appearances for Scunthorpe United and Gillingham, and Richard made more than 350, of which 135 were for Northampton Town and the remainder split between six other clubs. In middle age, Hope was diagnosed with Parkinson's disease.
