= Mickaël Buscher =

French footballer (born 1987)

Personal information
- Date of birth: 11 January 1987 (age 39)
- Place of birth: Landerneau, France
- Height: 1.85 m (6 ft 1 in)
- Positions: Striker; winger

Youth career
- 2002–2005: Nice

Senior career*
Years	Team	Apps	(Gls)
2005–2007	Nice	0	(0)
2007–2008	Gretna	17	(1)
2008–2009	Grimsby Town	0	(0)
2010	CS Hammam-Lif	13	(4)
2010–2011	CA Bizertin	3	(0)
2011–2013	Nice B		
2013	AS Marsa		
2014	Canterbury United		
2014–2016	CS Hammam-Lif	19	(2)
2017–2018	Grasse	6	(2)
2018–2020	AS Vence		
2020–2021	US Cap d'Ail		

International career
2002	France U16	1	(0)
2003	France U17	1	(0)
- * Club domestic league appearances and goals

Mickaël Buscher (born 11 January 1987) is a French former professional footballer who played as a striker and winger.

He played in his native France for Nice and Grasse, in Scotland for Gretna, in England for Grimsby Town, in Tunisia for CS Hammam-Lif, CA Bizertin, and AS Marsa, and in New Zealand for Canterbury United.

He was capped at France U16 and U17 level.

== Career ==
=== Nice ===
Buscher was born in Landerneau, Finistère, while his father, former French international Gérard Buscher, was a player for nearby Brest. Buscher began his football career in the youth system at OGC Nice where his father was on the coaching staff. While a junior with Nice, he played for France at under-16 and under-17 level, and was called up to the under-18s. He played regularly for the reserves in the Championnat de France Amateurs for three seasons from 2004–05 to 2006–07, but never broke through to the first team.

=== Gretna ===
Following a trial with Gretna, newly promoted to the Scottish Premier League, Buscher was released by Nice and signed a three-year contract with the club in August 2007. He scored his only goal for the club during a 4–2 win over Kilmarnock in early 2008. Following the financial troubles at Gretna, he was made redundant when the club folded and in March 2008 he joined fellow SPL side Hearts on a trial basis. However after spending time with the Edinburgh club he could not convince them to offer him a contract and he departed the club.

=== Grimsby Town ===
On 11 November 2008, Buscher was handed a trial by English club Grimsby Town with a view to a permanent move. He signed a contract with the club on 2 December joining fellow Frenchman Jean-Louis Akpa Akpro at the club until the end of the 2008–09 season. However Buscher's time at Grimsby was not a memorable one, as he failed to make a single appearance for the club's first team, as well as this, Bushcer also failed to make even the substitute bench. His only appearances for Grimsby came in the club's reserve team, managed by Stuart Watkiss. Manager Mike Newell commented saying that he had made a mistake when signing Buscher, and this was the reason that the player was never used in his 7-month stay at Blundell Park On 5 May 2009, Buscher's contract was cancelled ahead of schedule by mutual consent.

=== Later career ===
Buscher signed for Tunisian side CS Hammam-Lif for the 2009–2010 season and then in 2010 he joined fellow Tunisian outfit CA Bizertin. He has since played for Nice B, AS Marsa, Canterbury United and currently RC Grasse.
