= Peter Bore =

English footballer (born 1987)

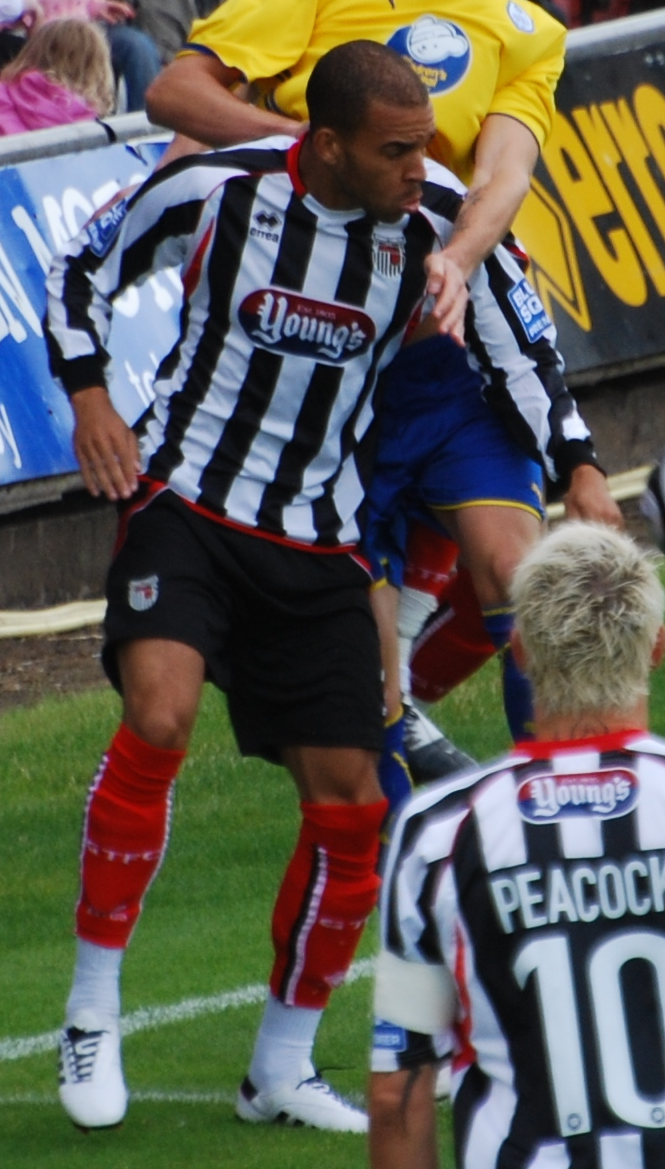
- Bore playing for Grimsby Town in 2010

Personal information
- Full name: Peter Charles Bore
- Date of birth: 4 November 1987 (age 39)
- Place of birth: Grimsby, England
- Height: 6 ft 0 in (1.83 m)
- Positions: Defender; winger; striker

Youth career
- 1999–2006: Grimsby Town

Senior career*
Years	Team	Apps	(Gls)
2006–2011	Grimsby Town	153	(15)
2008	→ York City (loan)	4	(0)
2011–2012	Harrogate Town	22	(3)
2012–2013	Lincoln City	18	(2)
2013	Gateshead	10	(0)
2013–2014	Boston United	12	(1)
2013–2014	→ Spalding United (loan)	8	(0)
2014	King's Lynn Town	11	(3)
2014	Spalding United	12	(2)
2016–2017	Cleethorpes Town	7	(1)
Total		257	(26)
- * Club domestic league appearances and goals as of 00:46, 5 November 2013 (UTC)

Peter Charles Bore (born 4 November 1987) is an English former professional footballer who played as a defender, winger and striker.

He began his career with his hometown club Grimsby Town, having been promoted to the first team for the beginning of the 2006–07 season. He made a scoring debut, netting twice in his first senior appearance. His performances with Grimsby earned him the "Supporters Player of the Season" for the 2009–10 season and he scored 15 goals in 153 league appearances, scoring two senior hat-tricks and playing in three different positions. Whilst with The Mariners, he was briefly loaned out to York City before joining Harrogate Town after leaving Grimsby in June 2011. In January 2012, he signed for Lincoln City but was released after spending nearly a year with The Imps and briefly joined Gateshead. He has since appeared for Boston United, King's Lynn Town, Spalding United and Cleethorpes Town.

== Career ==
=== Grimsby Town ===
Born in Grimsby, Lincolnshire, Bore was educated at the Matthew Humberstone School. He joined the youth system of hometown club Grimsby Town at the age of 12 and he signed a professional contract in August 2006. He made his first team debut as a substitute in the 67th minute against Boston United on 5 August when his side were 2–0 down, and after scoring two goals, with the first coming from his first touch of the game, Grimsby went on to win 3–2. Bore's first hat-trick came in the away game against Boston in February 2007, which finished as a 6–0 victory. He finished the 2006–07 season, his first as a professional, as Grimsby's joint top scorer with Gary Jones and Ciarán Toner after scoring eight goals in 36 appearances.

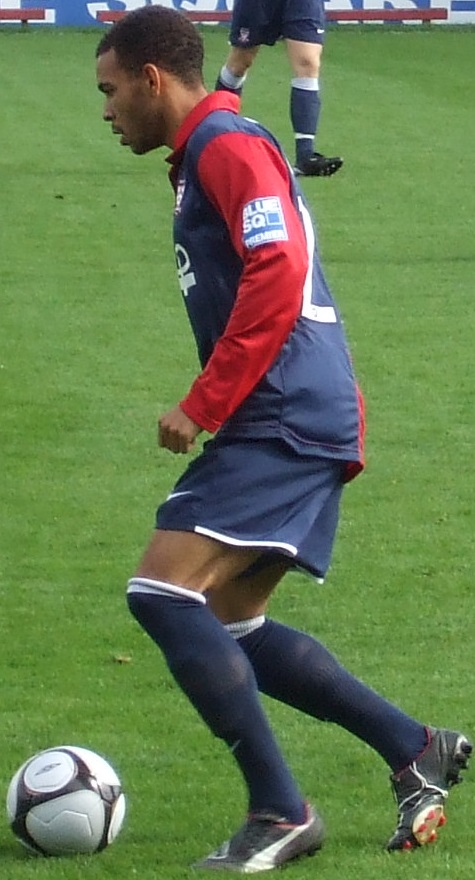
Bore playing for York City in 2008

He signed an initial one-month loan deal at York City in the Conference Premier on 1 September 2008. He made his debut a day later as a 56th-minute substitute in a 1–1 draw with Mansfield Town and started in the 2–0 victory against Woking four days later. He returned to Grimsby from his loan spell several days early after making four appearances for York. He made his return for Grimsby in a 1–1 draw against Wycombe Wanderers, during which he forced a Nick Hegarty shot over the line, giving the side the lead after 41 seconds. Two games later against Luton Town, Bore put Grimsby in the lead after scoring from a loose ball after 40 seconds, in a match that eventually finished as a 2–2 draw.

His performances gained him the club's Player of the Year award for the 2009–10 season, a year in which he was successfully converted to a right back following lengthy injuries to Robbie Stockdale. He finished with 42 appearances as Grimsby were relegated to the Conference Premier. Bore played in Grimsby's first game in the Conference Premier, a 1–0 victory at Crawley Town on 14 August. He rejected a new contract with Grimsby in December. On 1 January 2011 Bore scored his second hat trick as Grimsby demolished Mansfield Town 7–2 at Blundell Park. At the end of the season, Bore became out of contract and after turning down a fresh deal with Grimsby to pursue a step back up to the Football League he was released in May 2011.

=== Harrogate Town ===
During the summer of 2011 Bore began his search to get back into the Football League after snubbing a fresh contract with Grimsby. On 15 July 2011 Bore joined League One side AFC Bournemouth on trial, but on 29 July he was snubbed a contract by manager Lee Bradbury. On 27 July he joined Shrewsbury Town on trial, playing in the club's 2–1 defeat against Kidderminster Harriers, and on 6 August he played in a friendly for Fleetwood Town. After spending the summer failing to find himself a new club within the Football League, Bore eventually signed a contract for Harrogate Town who operated in the Conference North, a division below former employers Grimsby. Bore made his debut in a 3–2 defeat away at Stalybridge Celtic.

=== Lincoln City ===
Bore signed a contract with Lincoln City on 31 January 2012 keeping him at Sincil Bank until the end of the season. Despite playing for a struggling Lincoln side, and with his previous track record of being an integral player with Grimsby, Bore struggled to hold down a place in the Lincoln first team and in between injuries he failed to cement a first team place at either right back or on the right of midfield. On 7 January 2013, nearly a year after his arrival at Lincoln, he was released by the club on mutual consent. He played 23 times in all competitions, scoring 2 goals.

=== Non-League ===
On 28 January 2013 Bore joined Gateshead on an initial trial. He played, and got an assist, in a 3–1 win for Gateshead Reserves against Durham City in the Durham Challenge Cup on 31 January, and signed for Gateshead the following day. He made his Gateshead first team debut against Tamworth on 2 February 2013. Bore was one of seven players released by Gateshead at the end of the 2012–13 season. On 20 June 2013, Bore joined Boston United. On 28 October 2013 he signed for Spalding United on a dual registration loan deal.

On 3 January 2014 Bore signed for Northern Premier League side King's Lynn Town. In July 2014 Bore returned to Spalding where he signed on a permanent deal. On 3 October 2014, Bore was released by Spalding with manager Pat Rayment citing work commitments by the player as the main reason for his departure. Bore remained unattached until August 2016 when he signed for Cleethorpes Town but only remained with the club briefly.

== Style of play ==
Bore started his career as an attacking player, playing as a winger or a striker, before being converted into playing at right-back.

== Personal life ==
Bore now works as a Police Officer for Humberside Police.

== Career statistics ==
As of match played 19 October 2013.

Club	Season	League			FA Cup		League Cup		Other		Total	
Club	Season	Division	Apps	Goals	Apps	Goals	Apps	Goals	Apps	Goals	Apps	Goals
Grimsby Town	2006–07	League Two	32	8	1	0	1	0	2 (Note: Appearance(s) in Football League Trophy)	0	36	8
Grimsby Town	2007–08	League Two	17	2	1	0	1	0	4	0	23	2
Grimsby Town	2008–09	League Two	27	1	1	0	1	0	0	0	29	1
Grimsby Town	2009–10	League Two	40	0	1	0	0	0	1	0	42	0
Grimsby Town	2010–11	Conference Premier	37	4	2	0	—		2 (Note: Appearance(s) in FA Trophy)	0	41	4
Grimsby Town	Total		153	15	6	0	3	0	9	0	171	15
York City (loan)	2008–09	Conference Premier	4	0	0	0	—		0	0	4	0
Harrogate Town	2011–12	Conference North	22	3	0	0	—		1	0	23	3
Lincoln City	2011–12	Conference Premier	11	2	0	0	—		0	0	11	2
Lincoln City	2012–13	Conference Premier	7	0	3	0	—		1	0	11	0
Lincoln City	Total		18	2	3	0	—		1	0	22	2
Gateshead	2012–13	Conference Premier	10	0	0	0	—		0	0	10	0
Boston United	2013–14	Conference North	12	1	0	0	—		0	0	12	1
Career total			219	21	9	0	3	0	11	0	242	21

== Honours ==
Grimsby Town

- Football League Trophy runner-up: 2007–08

Individual

- Grimsby Town Player of the Year: 2009–10
