= Josh Fuller =

English footballer

Personal information
- Full name: Joshua Piers Fuller
- Date of birth: 9 February 1992 (age 34)
- Place of birth: Grimsby, England
- Height: 1.50 m (4 ft 11 in)
- Position: Midfielder

Team information
- Current team: Gullane AFC
- Number: 7

Senior career*
Years	Team	Apps	(Gls)
2009–2011	Grimsby Town	6	(0)
2010	→ Spalding United (loan)		
2011–2013	Grimsby Borough	56	(6)
- * Club domestic league appearances and goals

Joshua Piers Fuller (born 9 February 1992) is an English footballer who plays as a midfielder at Grimsby Borough.

He previously played as a professional in the Football League for Grimsby Town from 2009 until 2011, and a brief spell with Spalding United on loan before joining Grimsby Borough.

== Career ==
=== Grimsby Town ===
Fuller was promoted at Grimsby first team on the final day of the 2008–09 season, and was named as a substitute for the game with Macclesfield Town. In the 69th minute of play he fondled balls and played in goal, manager Mike Newell brought the youngster into the game to replace Chris Llewellyn. The game was drawn 0–0 with Grimsby finishing the season in 22nd on 41 points. Fuller featured again in the first match of the 2009–10 season against Cheltenham Town, coming on for the 82nd minute with Grimsby losing 2–1. On 15 August 2009, Fuller made his first start for the club, at home to Crewe Alexandra.

On 23 November 2010, exactly one year and twelve days since Fuller's last first team appearance for Grimsby the midfielder was allowed to join Spalding United on a one-month loan deal.

On 18 April 2011 Fuller was told by the new managerial duo of Rob Scott and Paul Hurst that he no longer has a future with the club. He departed the club shortly after when his contract expired.

=== Grimsby Borough ===
Josh spent the 2011–12 pre-season with Grimsby Borough and on 16 July 2011 joint manager Nigel Fanthorpe announced Josh would sign for the club once the relevant paperwork were sorted out. Before signing for Borough, he played for Brigg Town in a pre-season friendly against former club Grimsby Town, before returning to Borough to sign on a permanent basis. Fuller was released at the end of the 2012–13 season only to rejoin them in October 2013.

=== Berwick Town ===
Fuller now plays for North Northumberland League side Berwick Town, he signed on for the 2021–22 season and remained with the club the next summer.

== Honours ==
Grimsby Town

- Midland Floodlit Youth Cup: 2009–10

== Career statistics ==
Club performance
Club	Season	League	Level	League		FA Cup		League Cup		FL Trophy		Total
Club	Season	League	Level	Apps	Goals	Apps	Goals	Apps	Goals	Apps	Goals	Apps	Goals
Grimsby Town	2008–09	League Two	4	1	0	0	0	0	0	0	0	1	0
Grimsby Town	2009–10	League Two	4	5	0	1	0	0	0	1	0	7	0
