= Jean-Louis Akpa Akpro =

French footballer (born 1985)

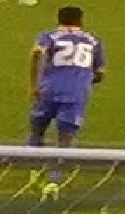
- Akpa Akpro in 2014

Personal information
- Full name: Jean-Louis Akpa Akpro
- Date of birth: 4 January 1985 (age 41)
- Place of birth: Toulouse, France
- Height: 1.82 m (6 ft 0 in)
- Position: Striker

Youth career
- 2000–2003: Toulouse

Senior career*
Years	Team	Apps	(Gls)
2003–2007	Toulouse	37	(4)
2007	→ Brest (loan)	15	(2)
2007–2008	FC Brussels	3	(0)
2008–2010	Grimsby Town	56	(8)
2010–2012	Rochdale	73	(11)
2012–2014	Tranmere Rovers	53	(10)
2014	→ Bury (loan)	10	(0)
2014–2016	Shrewsbury Town	83	(15)
2016–2018	Barnet	49	(4)
2017	→ Yeovil Town (loan)	13	(2)
2019	Masfout	11	(3)
2019–2020	Oldham Athletic	3	(0)
2020–2022	Radcliffe	47	(8)
2022–2024	Flint Town United	55	(15)
2024–2025	Glossop North End	1	(1)
2024–2025	→ Wythenshawe Town (dual-registration)	31	(6)
- * Club domestic league appearances and goals as of 18:45, 12 August 2024 (UTC)

Jean-Louis Akpa Akpro (born 4 January 1985) is a French professional footballer who plays as a forward.

Akpa Akpro came through the youth ranks at Toulouse FC where he picked up Ligue 1 experience, before moving to Belgian side FC Brussels. He subsequently moved to England, where he forged a career in the Football League, initially playing for Grimsby Town between 2008 and 2010 before moving on to Rochdale, Bury, Tranmere Rovers, Shrewsbury Town, Barnet, Yeovil Town and Oldham Athletic. In 2019, he had a brief hiatus from English football when he joined UAE side Masfout. In 2020 he joined English non-league club Radcliffe before signing for Welsh club Flint Town United in 2022.

He was previously called up to play international football for France at U18 level but injury forced him to withdraw from the squad.

== Early life ==
Akpa Akpro was born in Toulouse, Haute-Garonne.

== Career ==
=== Toulouse ===
Akpa Akpro started his career at his hometown club Ligue 1 club Toulouse as a youngster in 2003. While at with the club, he spent time on loan with Stade Brestois 29 in the French Second Division where he scored twice in 15 appearances. He featured in around 40 games for Toulouse from between 2003 and 2007, managing to score a total of three goals. While with Toulouse, Akpa Akpro was briefly called up to the France U18 International team, but was forced to withdraw from the squad due to injury. He was never selected again.

=== FCM Brussels ===
Akpa Akpro was released by Toulouse at the end of the 2006–07 season. He then left France and headed north where he signed for Belgian side FC Brussels in the summer of 2007. He remained with the club for the 2007–08 season, playing only a cameo role in the club's season by making only three appearances for the club. Akpro was released at the end of the season. After his departure from Brussels, Akpa Akpro had travelled to England where he joined Milton Keynes Dons in a pre-season trial, before also spending a week training with Colchester United. However, neither trial led to a contract offer and Akpa Akpro began the 2008–09 season as a free agent.

=== Grimsby Town ===
On 2 December 2008, Akpa Akpro joined English club Grimsby Town on trial with a view of earning a permanent contract. A day later he received international clearance to play for Grimsby's reserve team in their league fixture away against Bradford City. He played the entire 90 minutes in a 2–1 win for Grimsby. Two days later, on 4 December 2008 he was offered and subsequently signed an 18-month contract keeping him at Blundell Park until the end of the 2009–10 season. The signing of Akpro at Grimsby would be the third French-speaking player to join the club under Mike Newell, with Congolese midfielder Jean-Paul Kamudimba Kalala and fellow Frenchman Mickael Buscher also arriving at Cleethorpes. He originally was set to make his debut against Port Vale on 6 December, but his papers from the Belgian Football Association were not received on time for him to feature. He instead made his debut against Shrewsbury Town on 13 December, and helped Grimsby to record their first home league victory of the season with a 1–0 victory. He went on to make it into the League Two Team of the Week after setting up Nathan Jarman's winner against Wycombe Wanderers on 17 January 2009. In the remaining months of the season, The Mariners were involved in a relegation battle, in which Akpa Akpro found himself playing a key part, mainly being fielded in attack alongside Adam Proudlock. In March 2009, Akpro and Proudlock destroyed local rivals Lincoln City in a 5–1 victory, with Akpa Akpro scoring two, and Proudlock hitting a hat-trick. Towards the very end of the campaign Barry Conlon became Akpro's regular strike partner, and the two would turn out to become vital to the club's eventual survival from relegation. During the 2009–10 season, a managerial change saw the man responsible for his arrival at Grimsby, Mike Newell sacked in October 2009. During the season in which many different players were used all over the pitch, Akpro's role in the first team would change from week to week, with some weeks new boss Neil Woods choosing to play him in his usual attacking role, whilst other weeks he operated in a wide left position or on the wing, and in other weeks merely only a substitute and in some circumstances also failing to make the 18 man squad at all. Akpro would play his part in ending an awful club record when he scored in a 3–0 victory over Shrewsbury Town on 6 March 2010, which was Grimsby's first league victory in 25 games. Following relegation from the Football League, Akpro rejected Grimsby's new contract offer and left the club on 26 June 2010.

=== Rochdale ===
On 7 July he signed a two-year deal with League One newcomers Rochdale, after he turned down a new contract at Grimsby. He made his Rochdale debut in a friendly match against Fleetwood Town in which he scored from 20 yards out in a 3–0 victory. In his first season with Dale, the club earned a very respectable 9th place in League One, and were unlucky to miss out on capturing a play-off place. During the 2011–12 campaign Akpro and Rochdale were relegated.

=== Tranmere Rovers ===
On 19 June 2012 he signed a two-year deal with Tranmere Rovers, after he turned down a new contract from Rochdale. He scored a brace on his debut against Leyton Orient on 18 August 2012, this prompted his manager Ronnie Moore to comment saying Jean-Louis is capable of playing in the Premier League and that he fully expected him to score 20 goals throughout the coming season. After topping the scoring charts of League 1 with seven goals in ten games, it was announced Akpa Akpro would be out for three months with a fractured metatarsal, coming off in the 18th minute in a 1–0 victory away at Notts County.

Unfortunately Akpa Akpro, low on confidence following the injury, was never able to recapture his sensational early season form, scoring only one goal in the six remaining games of the season in which he played.

=== Shrewsbury Town ===
Following his release from Tranmere, Akpa Akpro signed a one-year contract for Shrewsbury Town in League Two on 2 July 2014. He made his Shrewsbury debut away at AFC Wimbledon on 9 August, and scored his first goal for the club ten days later, converting a penalty in a 4–0 rout of Accrington Stanley at New Meadow. His next goals for the club came in a career first hat-trick, against former loan club Bury in a 5–0 home win on 21 October. On 29 November, he scored a late winner against Burton Albion for Shrewsbury's 12th victory in 14 home games, as well as handing Jimmy Floyd Hasselbaink his first defeat as Burton manager.

Akpa Akpro scored the decisive goal in a 1–0 away win at Cheltenham Town as Shrewsbury secured promotion to League One on 25 April 2015. With the club close to the Financial Fair Play limit and unable to move on fringe players, chairman Roland Wycherley agreed to fund a one-year contract extension, which was signed in time for the player to be available for selection for the opening league match of the following season against Millwall. He scored his first goals of the season – a brace in a 2–0 win against Blackpool – to secure a first home victory of the campaign on 26 September. He ended the 2015–16 campaign with seven in total, including important late goals in the season run-in against Scunthorpe United, Bradford City and Gillingham, as Shrewsbury finished in 20th place, four points above the relegation zone. In May 2016, the club announced Akpa Akpro was to be released at the end of his contract.

=== Barnet ===
Akpa Akpro signed for Barnet on 1 July 2016. He scored his first goal for the club in a 2–0 win over Accrington Stanley on 13 August 2016.

On 31 January 2017, Akpa Akpro joined Yeovil Town on loan until the end of the season. He was released at the end of the 2017–18 season. In total, he played 57 times for the Bees, scoring 5 goals.

=== Later career ===
Akpa Akpro joined Masfout in 2019. He scored three goals in eleven games in the Emirati second tier.

Akpa Akpro returned to England with Oldham Athletic in November 2019, signing a short term deal. The club announced in January that he would leave the club on the expiry of his deal.

He joined Radcliffe in March 2020. He scored on his debut against Gainsborough Trinity on 3 March 2020.

In June 2022 he joined Cymru Premier side Flint Town United. He made his league debut for the club on 13 August.

In August 2024, Akpa Akpro joined North West Counties Football League Premier Division side Glossop North End on a dual-registration basis with Wythenshawe Town.

== Personal life ==
Akpa Akpro is of Ivorian descent and has two brothers who play football. Jean-Daniel who is an Ivory Coast international and Jean-Jacques.

== Career statistics ==
As of match played 23 April 2022

Appearances and goals by club, season and competition
Club	Season	League			National Cup		League Cup		Other		Total	
Club	Season	Division	Apps	Goals	Apps	Goals	Apps	Goals	Apps	Goals	Apps	Goals
Toulouse	2004–05	Ligue 1	13	0	2	0	1	0	—		16	0
Toulouse	2005–06	Ligue 1	14	3	1	0	3	0	—		18	3
Toulouse	2006–07	Ligue 1	10	1	0	0	2	1	—		12	2
Toulouse	Total		37	4	3	0	6	1	—		46	5
Brest (loan)	2006–07	Ligue 2	15	2	0	0	—		—		15	2
FC Brussels	2007–08	Belgian First Division	3	0	0	0	—		—		3	0
Grimsby Town	2008–09	League Two	20	3	0	0	0	0	0	0	20	3
Grimsby Town	2009–10	League Two	36	5	1	0	1	0	2 (Note: Appearance(s) in Football League Trophy)	0	40	5
Grimsby Town	Total		56	8	1	0	1	0	2	0	60	8
Rochdale	2010–11	League One	32	4	1	0	2	0	1	0	36	4
Rochdale	2011–12	League One	41	7	1	0	3	1	2	0	47	8
Rochdale	Total		73	11	2	0	5	1	3	0	83	12
Tranmere Rovers	2012–13	League One	28	8	0	0	2	0	0	0	30	8
Tranmere Rovers	2013–14	League One	25	2	2	0	3	0	1	0	31	2
Tranmere Rovers	Total		53	10	2	0	5	0	1	0	61	10
Bury (loan)	2013–14	League Two	10	0	—		—		—		10	0
Shrewsbury Town	2014–15	League Two	45	9	2	0	3	0	1	0	51	9
Shrewsbury Town	2015–16	League One	38	6	4	1	2	0	0	0	44	7
Shrewsbury Town	Total		83	15	6	1	5	0	1	0	95	16
Barnet	2016–17	League Two	23	1	1	0	1	0	2	0	27	1
Barnet	2017–18	League Two	26	3	1	0	2	1	1	0	30	4
Barnet	Total		49	4	2	0	3	1	3	0	57	5
Yeovil Town (loan)	2016–17	League Two	13	2	—		—		—		13	2
Masfut	2018–19	UAE First Division League	11	3	0	0	—		—		11	3
Oldham Athletic	2019–20	League Two	3	0	1	0	0	0	0	0	4	0
Radcliffe	2019–20	NPL Premier Division	3	1	—		—		—		3	1
Radcliffe	2020–21	NPL Premier Division	8	4	2	1	—		1 (Note: Appearance(s) in FA Trophy)	1	11	6
Radcliffe	2021–22	NPL Premier Division	36	3	2	1	—		4	1	42	5
Radcliffe	Total		47	8	3	2	—		5	2	56	12
Career total			453	67	21	3	25	3	15	2	514	75

== Honours ==
Shrewsbury Town

- Football League Two runner-up: 2014–15
