= Adam Proudlock =

English footballer and manager (born 1981)

Personal information
- Full name: Adam David Proudlock
- Date of birth: 9 May 1981 (age 45)
- Place of birth: Wellington, Telford, England
- Height: 1.83 m (6 ft 0 in)
- Position: Striker

Youth career
- 1998–2000: Wolverhampton Wanderers

Senior career*
Years	Team	Apps	(Gls)
1998–2003	Wolverhampton Wanderers	71	(13)
2000	→ Clyde (loan)	4	(4)
2002	→ Nottingham Forest (loan)	3	(0)
2002	→ Tranmere Rovers (loan)	5	(0)
2002–2003	→ Sheffield Wednesday (loan)	5	(2)
2003–2006	Sheffield Wednesday	50	(9)
2005–2006	→ Ipswich Town (loan)	7	(0)
2006	Ipswich Town	2	(0)
2006–2008	Stockport County	56	(11)
2008–2009	Darlington	8	(0)
2008–2009	→ Grimsby Town (loan)	9	(3)
2009–2010	Grimsby Town	46	(6)
2010–2012	AFC Telford United	33	(12)
2012	Chester	0	(0)
2012–2013	Market Drayton Town	8	(1)
2012–2013	→ Newport Town (loan)	2	(2)
2013	Whitehawk	1	(0)
2014–2015	Newport Town		
Total		310	(63)

Managerial career
- 2017–2018: Newport Town
- 2020: Eccleshall
- * Club domestic league appearances and goals

Adam David Proudlock (born 9 May 1981) is an English football manager and former professional footballer.

Proudlock played as a striker from 1998 to 2015. He started his career in the Football League with Wolverhampton Wanderers in 1998; he went on to make over 70 league appearances for the club, scoring 13 goals as well as spending time on loan with Clyde, Nottingham Forest, Tranmere Rovers and Sheffield Wednesday. He joined Wednesday permanently in 2003, where he made 50 appearances as well as appearing for Ipswich Town on loan before signing with Stockport County and Darlington. He ended his stay in professional football whilst in a two-year spell with Grimsby Town, in which the club were relegated to the Conference National in 2009–10.

Proudlock subsequently had spells at Non-league level for AFC Telford United, Chester and Market Drayton Town. He managed Eccleshall during 2020.

== Playing career ==
=== Wolverhampton Wanderers ===
Born in Wellington, Telford, Shropshire, Proudlock began his career as a trainee with Wolverhampton Wanderers in August 1998. He had a loan spell at Scottish side Clyde at the start of the 2000–01 season to gain first team experience. There, he scored a hat trick on his professional debut on 5 August 2000 against last seasons Scottish 1st Division champions Falkirk in a 3–1 win at Broadwood. He scored five times in six games for Clyde and was named Scottish Division One player of the month for August 2000. He was recalled by Wolves and offered a new contract until 2003. He became a regular starter for Wolves throughout that season, which he ended as their top goalscorer with 11 goals.

Proudlock found himself mostly relegated to the substitutes bench in the 2001–02 season after manager Dave Jones spent heavily in the close season on new attacking players. He scored a hat trick against Bradford City in October 2001, which earned praise from Jones, but these ended up his only goals of the season. A knee injury suffered in December 2001 that required surgery interrupted his season, a four-match suspension followed and having missed a lot of football, he joined Nottingham Forest on a one-month loan in March 2002.

Opportunities were limited at Molineux and Proudlock joined Tranmere on loan in October 2002 and Sheffield Wednesday on loan in December 2002, where he scored twice in five matches. He was recalled by Wolves in January 2003 and made a total of 22 appearances, almost all as substitute, for Wolves in the 2002–03 season as Wolves were promoted to the Premier League after beating Sheffield United in the Division One play-off final in May 2003. In total, he scored 17 goals for Wolves in 84 appearances.

=== Sheffield Wednesday ===
Proudlock joined Sheffield Wednesday on a three-year permanent deal in September 2003. He scored nine times during the 2003–04 season for his new club but suffered a broken leg in a training ground accident in November 2004, and did not play again in the 2004–05 season. He returned to the first team in the following season, but he joined Ipswich Town on a three-month loan in October 2005 after a one-week trial period. Proudlock then had his contract terminated by Sheffield Wednesday in September 2005 owing to a breach of discipline He had made 62 league and cup appearances for Sheffield Wednesday, scoring 17 goals.

=== Ipswich Town ===
Proudlock was given a short-term contract by Ipswich in January 2006 until the end of the 2005–06 season. However, he made only two further substitute appearances for Ipswich to add to the seven that he made while on loan. Proudlock was released from the Portman Road club at the end of the 2005–06 campaign.

=== Stockport County ===
Proudlock joined Stockport County on non-contract terms in August 2006. He agreed a permanent deal to the end of the 2007–08 season with Stockport in December 2006, and made 26 league and cup appearances for Stockport in the 2006–07 season, scoring six goals. The following season, he scored ten goals as Stockport reached and won the League Two play-off final at Wembley Stadium in May 2008. However, a week later he was released by the club as his contract expired,

=== Darlington ===
Following his release by County, Proudlock joined Darlington in July 2008 on a free transfer. However, he failed to score in any of his games for the club, and struggled to hold down a first team place. Proudlock was then made available for loan by his manager Dave Penney.

=== Grimsby Town ===
On 6 November 2008 Proudlock joined Grimsby Town on an initial two-month loan with a view to a permanent move. He made his debut in the FA Cup defeat to Morecambe. He managed to score his first goal for the club in a 2–1 away defeat against Port Vale, and after impressing manager Mike Newell in his loan stay, Proudlock was reported to be a target for the club in the January transfer window. Adam made his move to Grimsby a permanent one by signing for the club until the end of the 2010–11 season in January 2009. His strike partnership with fellow newcomer Jean-Louis Akpa Akpro resulted in Adam scoring a hat-trick against local rivals Lincoln City in a 5–1 victory on 7 March 2009. Following the arrival of loan striker Barry Conlon, Proudlock found himself playing second fiddle to him and Akpa-Akpro in the remaining games of the season, but his goals and performances were a great help in helping the club eventually stave off relegation from the Football League. Adam finished the 2008–09 season as the club's top goalscorer, with a total of 8.

Following only 1 league goal for The Mariners during the 09/10 season, on 12 May 2010, Proudlock was one of seven players placed on the transfer list by Grimsby manager Neil Woods after their relegation from the Football League. Proudlock left the club on 22 June 2010.

=== AFC Telford United ===
In July 2010 Proudlock began training with Hungarian side Ferencváros before being offered the chance of playing for Non League side Bridgnorth Town as well as receiving an offer from Stafford Rangers but instead Adam chose to join Kidderminster Harriers on trial After failing to impress the Harriers management he joined Andy Sinton's A.F.C. Telford United on trial and played in the club's friendly against Chasetown. He subsequently signed a short-term contract with the Bucks. In his first season, he helped the club to promotion from the Conference North, but soon suffered an injury that sidelined him for the majority of the 2011–12 season. He rejected a fresh contract at Telford in June 2012 as it involved reduced terms and a pay as you play deal.

=== Non-League ===
On 14 June 2012 Proudlock joined Conference North side Chester but left the club in September after his contract was cancelled by mutual consent.

After his release from Chester he then joined Market Drayton Town on a game-by game deal in October 2012. In December 2012 Proudlock moved on loan to his home town side Newport Town of the West Midlands Division Two

In July 2013 Proudlock signed for Whitehawk on non-contract terms, making his debut in the club's friendly with Crawley Town. He however left the club in August 2013 having been snubbed a further deal.

In the summer of 2014, Proudlock returned to Newport Town, also signing as a youth team coach.

== Coaching career ==
Proudlock coaches youngsters for both DoubleTouch coaching and with the youth setup at Newport Town. On 1 May 2018 Proudlock won his first trophy as a manager, the Shropshire Premier Cup, as he led his Newport Town side to a 3–1 win over Haughmond, a team two divisions higher. In June 2020 Proudlock was appointed manager of Eccleshall. He left the club at the end of October.

== Honours ==
=== As a player ===
Wolverhampton Wanderers

- Football League First Division play-offs: 2003

Stockport County

- Football League Two play-offs: 2008

AFC Telford United

- Conference North play-offs: 2011

=== As a manager ===
Newport Town

- West Midlands League Division One runner-up 2017–18
- Shropshire Premier Cup: 2017–18
