= Richard Hope (footballer) =

English footballer

Personal information
- Full name: Richard Paul Hope
- Date of birth: 22 June 1978 (age 48)
- Place of birth: Stockton-on-Tees, England
- Height: 6 ft 2 in (1.88 m)
- Position: Defender

Youth career
- 1991–1995: Blackburn Rovers

Senior career*
Years	Team	Apps	(Gls)
1995–1997	Blackburn Rovers	0	(0)
1997	→ Darlington (loan)	5	(0)
1997–1998	Darlington	57	(1)
1998	→ Northampton Town (loan)	1	(0)
1998–2003	Northampton Town	134	(7)
2003–2004	York City	36	(2)
2004–2005	Chester City	28	(2)
2005–2007	Shrewsbury Town	75	(2)
2007–2008	Wrexham	33	(0)
2008–2009	Grimsby Town	6	(0)
Total		374	(14)
- * Club domestic league appearances and goals

Richard Paul Hope (born 22 June 1978) is an English former footballer who played as a defender. He played for Darlington, Northampton Town, York City, Chester City, Shrewsbury Town, Wrexham and Grimsby Town, making over 350 appearances in the Football League.

== Career ==
=== Blackburn Rovers ===
Born in Stockton-on-Tees, Hope began his career as a trainee at Blackburn Rovers but made no appearances for the club. He joined Darlington on one-month loan in January, which brought him his first league experience, and played five games in the Third Division.

=== Darlington ===
He joined the club on a free transfer in the following month. He was a regular for Darlington for the following season-and-a-half, making over 60 league and cup appearances, but fell out of favour in the first half of the 1998–99 season and joined Northampton Town on loan in December 1998, which was quickly converted to a permanent signing a week later.

=== Northampton Town ===
Hope made over 150 appearances in four and a half seasons at Northampton, helping the club to automatic promotion to the Second Division in 2000. Following the club's relegation to the Third Division at the end of the 2002–03 season, Hope was released by Northampton in August 2003.

=== York City ===
Hope joined York City on a one-month contract in August 2003. He then signed a three-month contract in the following month. He stayed at York for the rest of the season but after the club was relegated to the Conference National at the end of the 2003–04 season he left the club.

=== Chester City ===
He then signed for Conference champions Chester City on a two-year contract. Hope made 28 appearances in League Two for Chester in the 2004–05 season, helping the club to avoid relegation. He also scored in Chester's memorable Football League Trophy win over Sheffield Wednesday.

=== Shrewsbury Town ===
Shrewsbury Town signed Hope on free transfer in August 2005 after being allowed to leave Chester as he did not feature in manager Keith Curle's plans for the 2005–06 season. He became a regular for Shrewsbury and was made club captain. He made over 75 appearances in two seasons, helping the club to the League Two play-off final in May 2007. Following defeat in the play-off final, Hope was released by Shrewsbury.

=== Wrexham ===
His next port of call was to sign for Wrexham in June 2007. He made 35 league and cup appearances for Wrexham in the 2007–08 season but was transfer listed in May 2008 following the club's relegation to the Conference.

=== Grimsby Town ===
He returned to League Two with a move to Grimsby Town after being handed a two-year contract by Alan Buckley in June. However, after struggling to hold down a first team place, his contract at Grimsby was cancelled by mutual consent on 7 February 2009, departing Blundell Park after only featuring seven times during the 2008–09 season.

== Personal life ==
After Hope retired from football, he retrained to work on oil rigs in the North Sea. Hope's father, John, played League football as a goalkeeper, and his older brother Chris played as a defender.
