= 2006–07 Grimsby Town F.C. season =

Grimsby Town
2006–07 season
- Chairman: John Fenty
- Manager: Graham Rodger (sacked 6/11/06); Alan Buckley (9/11/06)
- League Two: 15th
- FA Cup: First Round
- League Cup: First Round
- Football League Trophy: Second Round
- Top goalscorer: League: Peter Bore, Gary Jones, Ciaran Toner(8); All: Peter Bore, Gary Jones, Ciaran Toner(8)
- Highest home attendance: 6,137 v Lincoln City (28 April 2007)
- Lowest home attendance: 1,635 v Crewe Alexandra (22 August 2006)
Home colours	Away colours

Grimsby Town Football Club entered the 2006–07 season as a member of League Two for the 3rd season on the trot. The club was managed by new appointment Graham Rodger. The club is still aiming to leave Blundell Park within the next few seasons.

== Fixtures and results ==
=== Friendlies ===
Date	Opponent	Venue	Result	Attendance	Scorers
11 Jul	Lincoln United	Ashby Avenue, Lincoln	W 1 - 0	-	North
14 Jul	Gainsborough Trinity	The Northolme, Gainsborough	W 1 - 0	-	Rankin
17 Jul	Doncaster Rovers	Blundell Park, Cleethorpes	L 0 - 2	-	-
24 Jul	Rotherham United	Blundell Park, Cleethorpes	L 0 - 2	-	-
28 Jul	Stoke City	Blundell Park, Cleethorpes	L 0 - 1	-	-
Jul	Leeds United	Blundell Park, Cleethorpes	D 1 - 1	-	Rankin

=== Lincolnshire Cup ===
Date	Opponent	Venue	Result	Attendance	Scorers
20 Jul	Lincoln City	Blundell Park, Cleethorpes	L 0 - 2	-	-

=== Football League Two ===
Date	Opponent	Venue	Result	Attendance	Scorers
5 Aug	Boston United	Blundell Park, Cleethorpes	W 3 - 2	-	Bore (2), Rankin
8 Aug	Wrexham	The Racecourse Ground, Wrexham	L 0 - 3	-	-
12 Aug	Bristol Rovers	Memorial Ground, Bristol	L 0 - 1	-	-
18 Aug	Mansfield Town	Field Mill, Mansfield	D 1 - 1	-	Bore
26 Aug	Bury	Gigg Lane, Bury	L 0 - 3	-	-
1 Sep	Macclesfield Town	Blundell Park, Cleethorpes	D 1 - 1	-	Toner
9 Sep	Walsall	Blundell Park, Cleethorpes	W 2 - 1	-	Bolland, Bore
12 Sep	Rochdale	Spotland, Rochdale	L 0 - 1	-	-
16 Sep	Chester City	Deva Stadium, Chester	W 2 - 0	-	Jones, Taylor
23 Sep	Stockport County	Edgeley Park, Cleethorpes	L 0 - 1	-	-
26 Sep	Hartlepool United	Blundell Park, Cleethorpes	L 1 - 4	-	Fenton
29 Sep	Darlington	Darlington Arena, Darlington	D 2 - 2	-	Toner, Ravenhill
8 Oct	Hereford United	Blundell Park, Cleethorpes	W 2 - 1	-	Jones (2)
14 Oct	Swindon Town	The County Ground, Swindon	L 0 - 3	-	-
21 Oct	Notts County	Blundell Park, Cleethorpes	L 0 - 2	-	-
28 Oct	Peterborough United	London Road, Peterborough	D 2 - 2	-	Toner, Bore
4 Nov	Milton Keynes Dons	Blundell Park, Cleethorpes	L 1 - 3	-	Ravenhill
18 Nov	Wycombe Wanderers	Adams Park, Wycombe	D 1 - 1	-	Jones
25 Nov	Accrington Stanley	Blundell Park, Cleethorpes	2 - 0	-	Paterson, Jones
5 Dec	Barnet	Underhill Stadium, Barnet, London	W 1 - 0	-	Paterson
9 Dec	Shrewsbury Town	Blundell Park, Cleethorpes	W 2 - 1	-	Paterson (2)
16 Dec	Lincoln City	Sincil Bank, Lincoln	L 0 - 2	-	-
22 Dec	Torquay United	Blundell Park, Cleethorpes	W 2 - 0	-	Rankin, Fenton
26 Dec	Hartlepool United	Victoria Park, Hartlepool	L 0 - 2	-	-
30 Dec	Stockport County	Edgeley Park, Cleethorpes	L 0 - 3	-	-
1 Jan	Rochdale	Blundell Park, Cleethorpes	L 0 - 4	-	-
9 Jan	Chester City	Blundell Park, Cleethorpes	L 0 - 2	-	-
15 Jan	Walsall	Bescot Stadium, Walsall	L 0 - 2	-	-
20 Jan	Darlington	Blundell Park, Cleethorpes	L 0 - 1	-	-
26 Jan	Torquay United	Plainmoor, Torquay	L 1 - 4	-	Paterson
3 Feb	Boston United	York Street, Boston	W 6 - 0	-	Bore (3), Toner, Hunt, Paterson
10 Feb	Bristol Rovers	Blundell Park, Cleethorpes	W 4 - 3	-	North, Whittle, Boshell, Toner
17 Feb	Mansfield Town	Field Mill, Mansfield	W 2 - 1	-	Bolland, North
20 Feb	Wrexham	Blundell Park, Cleethorpes	W 2 - 1	-	Bolland, Toner
24 Feb	Macclesfield Town	Moss Rose, Macclesfield	L 1 - 2	-	Jones
3 Mar	Bury	Blundell Park, Cleethorpes	W 2 - 0	-	North, Toner
10 Mar	Hereford United	Edgar Street, Hereford	W 1 - 0	-	Bolland
17 Mar	Swindon Town	Blundell Park, Cleethorpes	W 1 - 0	-	Toner
24 Mar	Peterborough United	Blundell Park, Cleethorpes	L 0 - 2	-	-
31 Mar	Notts County	Meadow Lane, Nottingham	L 0 - 2	-	-
7 Apr	Milton Keynes Dons	National Hockey Stadium, Milton Keynes	W 2 - 1	-	Hunt, Boshell
9 Apr	Wycombe Wanderers	Blundell Park, Cleethorpes	D 2 - 2	-	Jones, Bolland
14 Apr	Accrington Stanley	Crown Ground, Accrington	L 1 - 4	-	Newey
21 Apr	Barnet	Blundell Park, Cleethorpes	W 5 - 0	-	Jones, North (3), Fenton
28 Apr	Lincoln City	Blundell Park, Cleethorpes	D 0 - 0	-	-
5 May	Shrewsbury Town	Gay Meadow, Shrewsbury	D 2 - 2	-	Taylor, Fenton

=== FA Cup ===
Date	Opponent	Venue	Result	Attendance	Scorers
11 Nov	Northampton Town	Sixfields Stadium, Northampton	D 0 - 0	-	-
21 Nov	Northampton Town	Blundell Park, Cleethorpes	L 0 - 2	-	-

=== League Cup ===
Date	Opponent	Venue	Result	Attendance	Scorers
22 Aug	Crewe Alexandra	Blundell Park, Cleethorpes	L 0 - 3	-	-

=== Football League Trophy ===
Date	Opponent	Venue	Result	Attendance	Scorers
17 Oct	Lincoln City	Sincil Bank, Lincoln	D 0 - 0	-	Grimsby win 5–3 on penalties
31 Oct	Mansfield Town	Field Mill, Mansfield	L 0 - 3	-	-

== League table ==
The four teams relegated from League One in 2005–06 would occupy the top four this season, sending Walsall, Hartlepool and Swindon back up. Bristol Rovers won the play-offs however, returning to League One after six years.

Torquay United had been both the last team to finish bottom under the old election system, and the last team to finish bottom of the League and survive due to the Conference champions not having a good enough ground. However, this season they finished bottom and dropped out of the League. They were joined by Boston United, who went into administration in the 87th minute of the season's final game (but would still have been relegated even without the 10-point administration penalty).

Pos	Team	Pld	W	D	L	GF	GA	GD	Pts
13	Notts County	46	16	14	16	55	53	+2	62
14	Barnet	46	16	11	19	55	70	−15	59
15	Grimsby Town	46	17	8	21	57	73	−16	59
16	Hereford United	46	14	13	19	45	53	−8	55
17	Mansfield Town	46	14	12	20	58	63	−5	54

Rules for classification: In the Football League goals scored (GF) takes precedence over goal difference (GD).

== Coaching staff ==
Role	Nationality	Name
First-Team Manager (sacked 06/11/06)	(England)	Graham Rodger
First-Team Manager (hired 9/11/06)	(England)	Alan Buckley
First-Team Assistant Manager	(England)	Stuart Watkiss
Player/Coach (released 27 October 2006)	(England)	Peter Beagrie
Reserve Team Manager	(England)	Stuart Watkiss
Head of Youth	(England)	Neil Woods
Youth Team Manager	(England)	Neil Woods
Physiotherapist	(England)	David Moore
Community Sport Coach	(England)	Gary Childs

== Squad overview ==
Note: Flags indicate national team as defined under FIFA eligibility rules; some limited exceptions apply. Players may hold more than one non-FIFA nationality.

No.	Pos.	Nation	Player
1	GK	ENG	Phil Barnes
2	DF	ENG	John McDermott
3	DF	ENG	Tom Newey
4	MF	SCO	Gary Harkins
5	DF	ENG	Ben Futcher (Departed in August 2006)
5	DF	ENG	Nick Fenton
6	DF	ENG	Justin Whittle
7	FW	ENG	Isaiah Rankin
8	MF	ENG	Paul Bolland
9	FW	IRL	Michael Reddy
10	MF	NIR	Ciaran Toner
11	MF	ENG	Peter Beagrie (Departed in October 2006)
11	MF	WAL	Anthony Pulis (on loan from Stoke City)
12	MF	ENG	Ricky Ravenhill (Departed in January 2007)
13	GK	ENG	Robert Murray
14	MF	ENG	Terry Barwick (Departed in August 2006)
14	FW	ENG	James Lawson (on loan from Southend United)
14	MF	ENG	Kevin James (on loan from Nottingham Forest)
14	FW	NIR	Martin Paterson (on loan from Stoke City)
15	MF	ENG	Gary Cohen

No.	Pos.	Nation	Player
16	MF	ENG	Danny Boshell
17	DF	SCO	Martin McIntosh (on loan from Huddersfield Town)
17	DF	ENG	Andy Butler (on loan from Scunthorpe United)
17	MF	ENG	Peter Till
18	MF	ENG	Peter Bore
19	FW	ENG	Gary Jones
20	DF	ENG	Gary Croft
21	MF	ENG	Paul Ashton (Departed in January 2007)
21	MF	AUS	Nicky Rizzo (on loan from Milton Keynes Dons)
22	FW	ENG	Danny North
23	MF	ENG	Nick Hegarty
24	MF	ENG	Ben Higgins (Departed in January 2007)
24	DF	ENG	Simon Grand
25	DF	ENG	Miles Chamberlain (Departed in January 2007)
25	MF	ENG	James Hunt (on loan from Bristol Rovers)
26	FW	ENG	Andy Taylor
27	FW	ENG	Tony Thorpe
28	DF	ENG	Ryan Bennett
29	DF	ENG	Matthew Bloomer

=== Appearances and goals ===
No.	Pos	Nat	Player	Total		League Two		League Cup		Football League Trophy		FA Cup	
No.	Pos	Nat	Player	Apps	Goals	Apps	Goals	Apps	Goals	Apps	Goals	Apps	Goals
1	GK	(England) ENG	Phil Barnes	51	0	46	0	1	0	2	0	2	0
2	DF	(England) ENG	John McDermott	27	0	23	0	0	0	2	0	2	0
3	DF	(England) ENG	Tom Newey	46	1	43	1	1	0	1	0	1	0
4	MF	(Scotland) SCO	Gary Harkins	17	3	17	2	0	1	0	0	0	0
5	DF	(England) ENG	Ben Futcher	5	0	4	0	1	0	0	0	0	0
5	DF	(England) ENG	Nick Fenton	42	4	38	4	0	0	2	0	2	0
6	DF	(England) ENG	Justin Whittle	42	1	37	1	1	0	2	0	2	0
7	FW	(England) ENG	Isaiah Rankin	23	2	20	2	1	0	1	0	1	0
8	MF	(England) ENG	Paul Bolland	42	5	39	5	1	0	0	0	2	0
9	MF	(Republic of Ireland) IRL	Michael Reddy	11	0	10	0	1	0	0	0	0	0
10	MF	(Northern Ireland) NIR	Ciaran Toner	37	8	33	8	1	0	2	0	1	0
11	MF	(England) ENG	Peter Beagrie	10	0	9	0	1	0	0	0	0	0
11	MF	(Wales) WAL	Anthony Pulis (on loan from Stoke City)	9	0	9	0	0	0	0	0	0	0
12	MF	(England) ENG	Ricky Ravenhill	20	2	17	2	1	0	0	0	2	0
13	GK	(England) ENG	Robert Murray	0	0	0	0	0	0	0	0	0	0
14	MF	(England) ENG	Terry Barwick	0	0	0	0	0	0	0	0	0	0
14	MF	(England) ENG	Kevin James (on loan from Nottingham Forest)	3	0	2	0	0	0	1	0	0	0
14	FW	(England) ENG	James Lawson (on loan from Southend United)	1	0	1	0	0	0	0	0	0	0
14	FW	(Northern Ireland) NIR	Martin Paterson (on loan from Stoke City)	15	6	15	6	0	0	0	0	0	0
15	FW	(England) ENG	Gary Cohen	0	0	0	0	0	0	0	0	0	0
16	MF	(England) ENG	Danny Boshell	33	2	29	2	0	0	2	0	2	0
17	DF	(Scotland) SCO	Martin McIntosh (on loan from Huddersfield Town)	4	0	4	0	0	0	0	0	0	0
17	DF	(England) ENG	Andy Butler (on loan from Scunthorpe United)	5	0	4	0	0	0	1	0	0	0
17	MF	(England) ENG	Peter Till	22	0	22	0	0	0	0	0	0	0
18	MF	(England) ENG	Peter Bore	35	8	31	8	1	0	2	0	1	0
19	FW	(England) ENG	Gary Jones	42	8	39	8	1	0	1	0	1	0
20	DF	(England) ENG	Gary Croft	33	0	28	0	1	0	2	0	2	0
21	MF	(England) ENG	Paul Ashton	0	0	0	0	0	0	0	0	0	0
21	FW	(Australia) AUS	Nicky Rizzo (on loan from Milton Keynes Dons)	1	0	1	0	0	0	0	0	0	0
22	FW	(England) ENG	Danny North	23	6	20	6	0	0	1	0	2	0
23	MF	(England) ENG	Nick Hegarty	19	0	15	0	0	0	2	0	2	0
24	DF	(England) ENG	Ben Higgins	0	0	0	0	0	0	0	0	0	0
24	DF	(England) ENG	Simon Grand	7	0	7	0	0	0	0	0	0	0
25	DF	(England) ENG	Miles Chamberlain	0	0	0	0	0	0	0	0	0	0
25	MF	(England) ENG	James Hunt (on loan from Bristol Rovers)	15	2	15	2	0	0	0	0	0	0
26	FW	(England) ENG	Andy Taylor	12	2	11	2	0	0	0	0	1	0
27	FW	(England) ENG	Tony Thorpe	7	0	6	0	0	0	1	0	0	0
28	DF	(England) ENG	Ryan Bennett	5	0	5	0	0	0	0	0	0	0
29	DF	(England) ENG	Matthew Bloomer	9	0	9	0	0	0	0	0	0	0

=== Loaned out player stats ===
No.	Pos	Nat	Player	Total		League Two		League Cup		Football League Trophy		FA Cup	
No.	Pos	Nat	Player	Apps	Goals	Apps	Goals	Apps	Goals	Apps	Goals	Apps	Goals
7	FW	(England) ENG	Isaiah Rankin (on loan at Macclesfield Town)	4	0	4	0	0	0	0	0	0	0
12	MF	(England) ENG	Ricky Ravenhill (on loan at Darlington)	1	0	1	0	0	0	0	0	0	0

== Transfers ==
=== In ===
==== Pre-season ====
#	Player	From	Age	Fee
01	(England) Phil Barnes	(England) Sheffield United	27	Free Transfer
04	(Scotland) Gary Harkins	(England) Blackburn Rovers	21	Free Transfer
07	(England) Isaiah Rankin	(England) Brentford	27	Free Transfer
11	(England) Peter Beagrie	(England) Scunthorpe United	40	Free Transfer
16	(England) Danny Boshell	(England) Stockport County	25	Free Transfer
18	(England) Peter Bore	(England) Grimsby Town Youth Academy	18	Professional Contract

==== Mid-season ====
#	Player	To	Age	Fee
05	(England) Nick Fenton	(England) Doncaster Rovers	26	Free Transfer
11	(Wales) Anthony Pulis	(England) Stoke City	22	Loan
12	(England) Ricky Ravenhill	(England) Doncaster Rovers	25	Free Transfer
14	(England) Kevin James	(England) Nottingham Forest	26	Loan
14	(England) James Lawson	(England) Southend United	19	Loan
14	(Northern Ireland) Martin Paterson	(England) Stoke City	20	Loan
17	(England) Andy Butler	(England) Scunthorpe United	22	Loan
17	(Scotland) Martin McIntosh	(England) Huddersfield Town	35	Loan
17	(England) Peter Till	(England) Birmingham City	20	Loan
17	(England) Peter Till	(England) Birmingham City	20	Free Transfer
21	(Australia) Nicky Rizzo	(England) MK Dons	27	Loan
24	(England) Simon Grand	(England) Carlisle United	22	Loan
24	(England) Simon Grand	(England) Carlisle United	22	Free Transfer
25	(England) James Hunt	(England) Bristol Rovers	29	Loan
27	(England) Tony Thorpe	(England) Stevenage Borough	32	Loan
27	(England) Tony Thorpe	(England) Stevenage Borough	32	Free Transfer
28	(England) Ryan Bennett	(England) Ipswich Town	17	Professional Contract
29	(England) Matthew Bloomer	(England) Cambridge United	27	Free Transfer

=== Out ===
==== Pre-season ====
#	Player	To	Age	Fee
01	(England) Steve Mildenhall	(England) Yeovil Town	28	Free Transfer
07	(Democratic Republic of the Congo) Jean-Paul Kamudimba Kalala	(England) Yeovil Town	24	Free Transfer
10	(England) Marc Goodfellow	(England) Bury	24	Free Transfer
11	(England) Andy Parkinson	(England) Notts County	27	Free Transfer
12	(England) Rob Jones	(Scotland) Hibernian	26	£200,000
13	(England) John Lukic jnr	Released	19	Free Transfer
16	(England) Jermaine Palmer	(England) Worksop Town	20	Free Transfer
17	(England) Glen Downey	(England) Worksop Town	26	Free Transfer
21	(England) Alan Lamb	(England) Eastwood Town	18	Free Transfer
32	(England) Curtis Woodhouse	Released	28	Retired to compete in Boxing

==== Mid-season ====
#	Player	To	Age	Fee
05	(England) Ben Futcher	(England) Peterborough United	25	Free Transfer
07	(England) Isaiah Rankin	(England) Macclesfield Town	27	Loan
11	(England) Peter Beagrie	Released	40	Retired
12	(England) Ricky Ravenhill	(England) Darlington	25	Loan
12	(England) Ricky Ravenhill	(England) Darlington	25	Undisclosed
14	(England) Terry Barwick	(England) Northwich Victoria	23	Free Transfer
21	(England) Paul Ashton	(England) Ossett Town	20	Free Transfer
24	(England) Ben Higgins	(England) Eastwood Town	18	Free Transfer
25	(England) Miles Chamberlain	(England) Eastwood Town	18	Free Transfer
