= 2006 Football League Two play-off final =

Football match

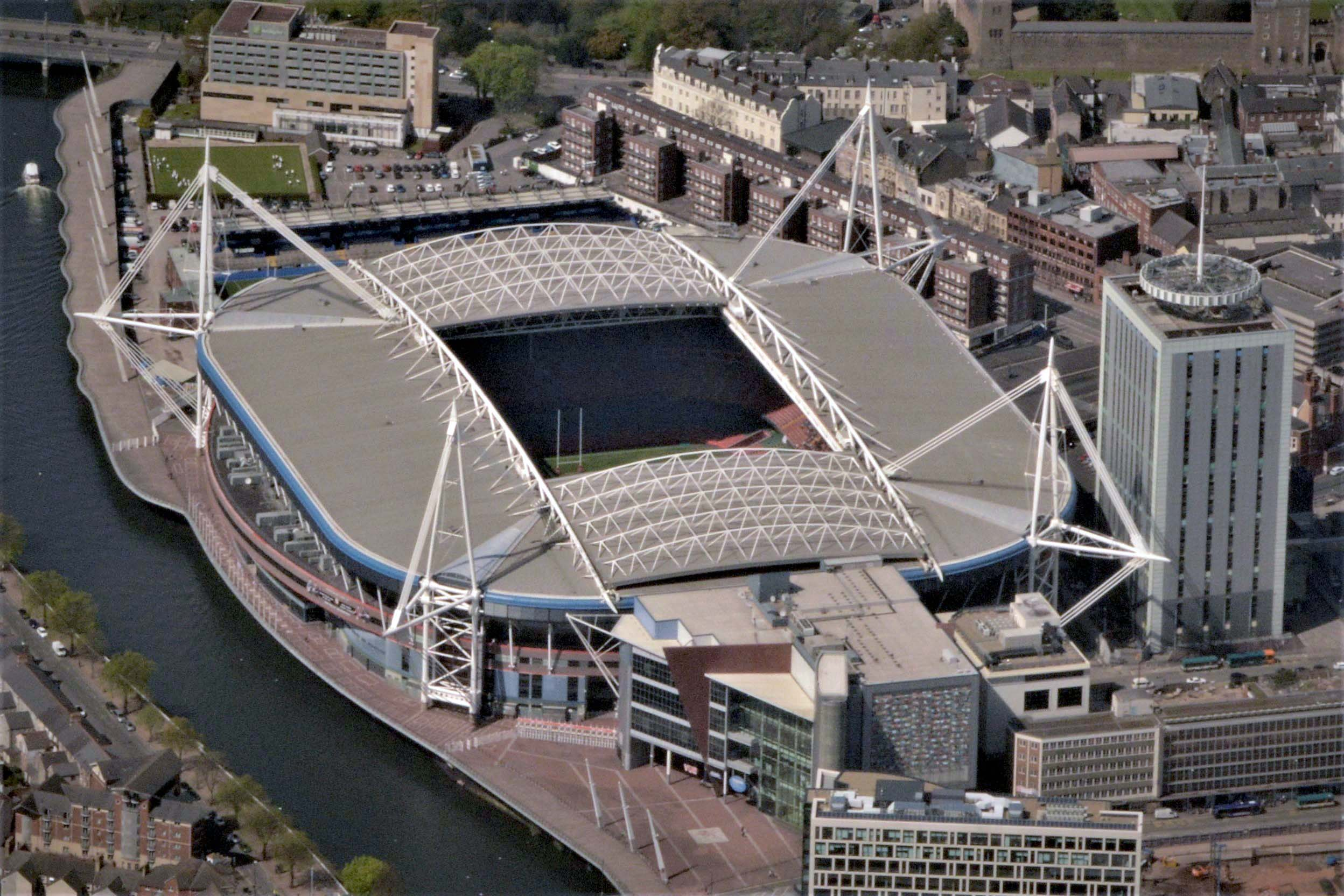
- The Millennium Stadium in Cardiff
| Grimsby Town | Cheltenham Town |
| 0 | 1 |
- Date: 28 May 2006
- Venue: Millennium Stadium, Cardiff
- Referee: Paul Taylor
- Attendance: 29,196

The 2006 Football League Two play-off final was an association football match played on 28 May 2006 at the Millennium Stadium, Cardiff, between Grimsby Town and Cheltenham Town. The match determined the fourth and final team to gain promotion from Football League Two, English football's fourth tier, to Football League One. The top three teams of the 2005–06 Football League Two season gained automatic promotion to League One, while the teams placed from fourth to seventh in the table took part in play-off semi-finals; the winners of these semi-finals competed for the final place for the 2006–07 season in League One. Grimsby Town finished in fourth place while Cheltenham Town ended the season in fifth position. They beat Lincoln City and Wycombe Wanderers, respectively, in the semi-finals.

The match was refereed by Paul Taylor in front of 29,196 spectators. The first half was goalless, during which both sides were forced to make a substitution after both Michael Reddy and Craig Armstrong were injured in an aerial challenge. On 63 minutes, Cheltenham took the lead after Steve Guinan shot past several defenders. Seven minutes later, Grant McCann was brought down in the Grimsby penalty area by Curtis Woodhouse and the referee awarded a penalty. McCann took the spot kick himself, but it was saved by Steve Mildenhall. The match ended 1–0 and Cheltenham secured promotion to League One.

In their following season, Grimsby finished in 15th place in League Two. Cheltenham's next season saw them end the season in 17th place in League One, four places and seven points above the relegation zone.

== Route to the final ==
Football League Two final table, leading positions
| Pos | Team | Pld | W | D | L | GF | GA | GD | Pts |
|---|---|---|---|---|---|---|---|---|---|
| 1 | Carlisle United | 46 | 25 | 11 | 10 | 84 | 42 | +42 | 86 |
| 2 | Northampton Town | 46 | 22 | 17 | 7 | 63 | 37 | +26 | 83 |
| 3 | Leyton Orient | 46 | 22 | 15 | 9 | 67 | 51 | +16 | 81 |
| 4 | Grimsby Town | 46 | 22 | 12 | 12 | 64 | 44 | +20 | 78 |
| 5 | Cheltenham Town | 46 | 19 | 15 | 12 | 65 | 53 | +12 | 72 |
| 6 | Wycombe Wanderers | 46 | 18 | 17 | 11 | 72 | 56 | +16 | 71 |
| 7 | Lincoln City | 46 | 15 | 21 | 10 | 65 | 53 | +12 | 66 |

Grimsby Town finished the regular 2005–06 season in fourth place in Football League Two, the fourth tier of the English football league system, one place ahead of Cheltenham Town. Both therefore missed out on the three automatic places for promotion to Football League One and instead took part in the play-offs to determine the fourth promoted team. Grimsby Town finished three points behind Leyton Orient (who were promoted in third place), five behind Northampton Town (who were promoted in second place), and eight behind league winners Carlisle United. Cheltenham Town ended the season six points behind Grimsby Town. Grimsby had been denied automatic promotion on the final day of the regular season when they conceded a last-minute equaliser to Northampton Town while Leyton Orient scored a late winner at Oxford United.

Cheltenham Town's opponents in their play-off semi-final were Wycombe Wanderers, with the first match of the two-legged tie taking place at Adams Park in High Wycombe on 13 May 2006. The visitors took the lead two minutes before half-time when John Finnigan scored from Shane Duff's knockdown. Steve Guinan doubled their lead in the 75th minute before a close-range volley from Wycombe's Tommy Mooney in the last minute of the match made the final score 2–1 to Cheltenham. The second leg of the semi-final was held at Whaddon Road in Cheltenham five days later. The game ended goalless, with Guinan shooting over the Wycombe crossbar from close range in the 70th minute. Cheltenham progressed to the final with a 2–1 aggregate victory.

Grimsby Town faced Lincoln City in a Lincolnshire derby for the second semi-final, the first leg of which took place at Sincil Bank in Lincoln on 13 May 2006. Midway through the first half, Gary Jones put Grimsby into the lead from a Curtis Woodhouse cross. Two further Lincoln goals were disallowed, one for a foul and one for offside, and both sides struck the goal frames, Paul Bolland for Grimsby and Scott Kerr for Lincoln; the match ended 1–0. The second leg of the semi-final took place three days later at Blundell Park in Grimsby. Marvin Robinson scored for Lincoln with a header from Kerr's free kick on 27 minutes. Ben Futcher, who had come on as a substitute, levelled the match in the 60th minute. Jones then scored from a Woodhouse free kick with ten minutes remaining to make it 2–1 to Grimsby, before being sent off in the last minute. Grimsby progressed to the final with a 3–1 aggregate win.

== Match ==
=== Background ===
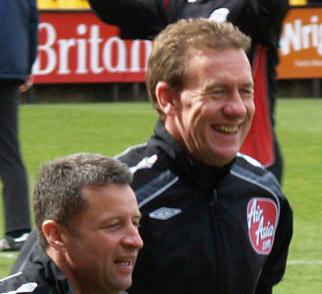
Paul Taylor (right, pictured in 2009) was the referee for the final.

Grimsby had participated in the play-offs once before, gaining promotion to the First Division after winning the 1998 Football League Second Division play-off final against Northampton Town at Wembley Stadium. They had played in the fourth tier of English football since being relegated in the 2003–04 season. Cheltenham had played in fourth-tier play-off finals once before: in 2002 they faced Rushden & Diamonds in the Third Division play-off final at the Millennium Stadium, winning 3–1. Cheltenham had played in League Two since being relegated in the 2002–03 season. In the two league games between the clubs during the regular season, Grimsby won both encounters: a 3–0 win at Whaddon Road in October 2005 was followed by a 1–0 victory at Blundell Park in April 2006.

Grimsby's top scorer during the regular season was Jones with 15 goals (13 in the league, 1 in the FA Cup and 1 in the League Cup) followed by Michael Reddy on 14 (all in the league). Kayode Odejayi was Cheltenham's leading marksman with 13 goals in the season (11 in the league and 2 in the FA Cup) followed by Grant McCann with 11 (8 in the league, 1 in the FA Cup and 2 in the League Cup) and Brian Wilson with 10 (9 in the league and 1 in the FA Cup).

Both sides adopted a 4–4–2 formation. Grimsby's Jones was selected in the starting eleven after a successful appeal overturned the red card he received in the second leg of the semi-final. Cheltenham made one change from their semi-final lineup, replacing Odejayi with Steven Gillespie. The referee for the match was Paul Taylor.

=== Summary ===
The final was kicked off by Cheltenham Town around 3 p.m. on 28 May 2006 in front of 29,196 spectators at the Millennium Stadium in Cardiff. Cheltenham made the better start and the first chance fell to Gillespie in the seventh minute, following a long pass from McCann, but Steve Mildenhall, the Grimsby goalkeeper, made the save. Three minutes later, a mistake from Jones allowed Guinan to shoot, but his strike was straight at Mildenhall; Woodhouse's shot then cleared the Grimsby crossbar by some distance. In the 17th minute, Finnigan's attempt went wide before an aerial collision between Craig Armstrong and Reddy forced both players to be substituted, Mickey Bell coming for Cheltenham and Gary Cohen for Grimsby. In the 33rd minute, Parkinson claimed he was fouled in the Cheltenham penalty area by Gavin Caines, but no penalty was awarded. Four minutes later Jones headed the ball wide of the Cheltenham goal, and after another two, Wilson struck a shot wide. In the last minute of the first half, Shane Higgs saved a low shot from Cohen before Parkinson's strike went over the crossbar. The first half ended goalless.

Neither side made any changes to the personnel during the interval and Grimsby kicked off the second half. They made the stronger start, but three minutes in, their goalkeeper made the first save of the half from a Caines header. On 63 minutes, Cheltenham took a 1–0 lead after Guinan shot past several defenders. Seven minutes later, Woodhouse brought down McCann in the Grimsby penalty area, and the referee awarded a penalty. McCann took the spot kick himself, but it was saved by Mildenhall. Within a minute, McCann's chip hit the Grimsby crossbar. In the 74th minute, Grimsby made their second substitution of the match, with Futcher coming on for Gary Croft, and three minutes later Cheltenham's Damian Spencer replaced Ashley Vincent. Higgs then saved a diving header from Jones in the 80th minute before Spencer was shown a yellow card for a foul on Mildenhall. Grimsby's Junior Mendes then came on for Marc Goodfellow before Woodhouse was shown the match's second yellow card, for a foul on Spencer. In the 86th minute, Jones shot wide and with a minute of regular time remaining, Woodhouse asked for a penalty after being brought down by Bell but the referee waved play on. After five minutes of stoppage time, the referee blew the final whistle with Cheltenham securing a 1–0 victory and promotion to League One.

=== Details ===
28 May 2006
15:00 BST

| Grimsby Town | 0–1 | Cheltenham Town |
|---|---|---|
| | Report | Guinan 63' |

Millennium Stadium, Cardiff
Attendance: 29,196
Referee: Paul Taylor

| Grimsby Town | Cheltenham Town |

| GK | 1 | Steve Mildenhall |
| RB | 20 | Gary Croft (substituted off) 75' |
| CB | 12 | Rob Jones |
| CB | 6 | Justin Whittle (c) |
| LB | 3 | Tom Newey |
| RM | 31 | Junior Mendes (substituted off) 83' |
| CM | 8 | Paul Bolland |
| CM | 32 | Curtis Woodhouse (yellow card) 85' |
| LM | 11 | Andy Parkinson |
| FW | 9 | Michael Reddy (substituted off) 27' |
| FW | 19 | Gary Jones |
Substitutes:
| DF | 5 | Ben Futcher (substituted on) 75' |
| RM | 10 | Marc Goodfellow (substituted on) 83' |
| CM | 18 | Ciarán Toner |
| CM | 7 | Jean-Paul Kalala |
| FW | 15 | Gary Cohen (substituted on) 27' |
Manager:
Russell Slade

| GK | 1 | Shane Higgs |
| RB | 2 | Jerry Gill |
| CB | 4 | Shane Duff |
| CB | 19 | Craig Armstrong | (substituted off) 27' |
| LB | 5 | Gavin Caines |
| RM | 18 | Ashley Vincent | | (substituted off) 77' |
| CM | 8 | John Finnigan | (c) |
| CM | 7 | Brian Wilson |
| LM | 11 | Grant McCann |
| CF | 9 | Steve Guinan |
| CF | 25 | Steven Gillespie | | (substituted off) 62' |
Substitutes:
| GK | 12 | Scott Brown |
| DF | 33 | Mickey Bell (substituted on) 27' |
| MF | 14 | Dave Bird |
| FW | 17 | Kayode Odejayi (substituted on) 62' |
| FW | 10 | Damian Spencer (substituted on) 77' (yellow card) 81' |
Manager:
John Ward

== Post-match ==
John Ward, the winning manager, said he was "thrilled", and added that his club's success was "the best thing I've ever done. We've probably overachieved in a short space of time but I'm really looking forward to seeing these players in League One". His counterpart Russell Slade said his side should have been awarded a first-half penalty: "Andy Parkinson is a very honest player and he said it was a stonewall penalty. Big moments change games and we felt that was a big moment". However, he admitted that "To be fair we possibly did not deserve it on the day ... Cheltenham started tremendously well but we didn't get into the game until the 30th minute." Winning goalscorer Guinan suggested that he had been "lucky" and that he had not meant to score.

In their following season, Grimsby finished in 15th place in League Two. Cheltenham's next season saw them end the season in 17th place in League One, four places and seven points above the relegation zone.
