= 2005–06 Grimsby Town F.C. season =

Grimsby Town
2005–06 season
- Chairman: John Fenty
- Manager: Russell Slade
- Football League Two: 4th (Play off runners up)
- FA Cup: First round
- League Cup: Third round
- Football League Trophy: First round
- Lincolnshire Senior Cup: Semi-final
- Top goalscorer: League: Gary Jones(15); All: Gary Jones(17)
- Highest home attendance: 8458 v Northampton Town (6 May 2006)
- Lowest home attendance: 1131 v Morecambe (18 October 2005)
Home colours	Away colours

The 2005–06 season is Grimsby Town's 128th season in their existence. They competed in Football League Two, alongside competing in the FA Cup, Football League Cup and the Football League Trophy. The season covers the period from 1 July 2005 to 30 June 2006.

== Transfers ==
=== Transfers in ===
Date	Pos	Player	Transferred from	Fee	Ref
25 May 2005	FW	(England) Jermaine Palmer	(England) Stoke City	Free Transfer	
8 June 2005	MF	(England) Terry Barwick	(England) Scunthorpe United	Free Transfer	
9 June 2005	GK	(England) John Lukic Jr.	(England) Nottingham Forest	Free Transfer	
22 June 2005	GK	(England) Steve Mildenhall	(England) Oldham Athletic	Free Transfer	
23 June 2005	MF	(England) Paul Bolland	(England) Notts County	Free Transfer	
27 June 2005	DF	(England) Tom Newey	(England) Cambridge United	Free Transfer	
1 July 2005	MF	(Democratic Republic of the Congo) Jean-Paul Kamudimba Kalala	(France) OGC Nice	Free Transfer	
1 July 2005	FW	(England) Gary Jones	(England) Tranmere Rovers	Free Transfer	
5 August 2005	DF	(England) Gary Croft	(Wales) Cardiff City	Free Transfer	
5 August 2005	MF	(England) Tom Taylor	(Norway) Viking FK	Free Transfer	
18 August 2005	FW	(Northern Ireland) Ciaran Toner	(England) Lincoln City	Free Transfer	
18 October 2005	FW	(England) Steve Slade	(Iceland) Vikingur Reykjavik	Free Transfer	
12 January 2006	DF	(England) Ben Futcher	(England) Boston United	Free Transfer	
27 January 2006	MF	(England) Curtis Woodhouse	(England) Hull City	Free Transfer	
31 January 2006	FW	(England) Marc Goodfellow	(England) Bristol City	Free Transfer	
31 January 2006	FW	(England) Gary Cohen	(Scotland) Gretna	Free Transfer	

=== Loans in ===
Date	Pos	Player	Transferred from	Date Until	Ref
29 June 2005	FW	(England) Gary Cohen	(Scotland) Gretna	30 January 2006	
1 August 2005	FW	(England) Calvin Andrew	(England) Luton Town	4 November 2005	
27 September 2005	DF	(England) Simon Francis	(England) Sheffield United	23 October 2005	
1 January 2006	DF	(England) Matthew Bloomer	(England) Lincoln City	31 January 2006	
17 January 2006	FW	(Montserrat) Junior Mendes	(England) Northampton Town	17 May 2006	

=== Transfers out ===
Date	Pos	Player	Transferred To	Fee	Ref
26 May 2005	DF	(England) Terrell Forbes	(England) Oldham Athletic	Free Transfer	
29 May 2005	DF	(England) Jason Crowe	(England) NorthamptonTown	Free Transfer	
29 May 2005	MF	(England) Graham Hockless	(England) North Ferriby United	Released	
29 May 2005	FW	(England) David Soames	(England) Armthorpe Welfare	Released	
9 June 2005	GK	(Wales) Anthony Williams	(England) Carlisle United	Released	
1 July 2005	MF	(England) Stacy Coldicott	(England) Hereford United	Released	
6 July 2005	MF	(England) Terry Fleming	(England) Kidderminster Harriers	Released	
7 July 2005	MF	(England) Ronnie Bull	New Zealand Knights	Released	
20 October 2005	FW	(England) Steve Slade	(England) Worthing	Released	
1 January 2006	DF	(England) Tony Crane	(England) Worksop Town	Free Transfer	
30 January 2006	FW	(Scotland) Martin Gritton	(England) Lincoln City	Undisclosed Fee	
31 January 2006	DF	(England) Simon Ramsden	(England) Rochdale	Free Transfer	
31 January 2006	MF	(England) Tom Taylor	(England) Buxton	Released	
30 March 2006	GK	(England) John Lukic Jr.	(England) Barnsley	Released	

=== Loans out ===
Date	Pos	Player	Transferred To	Date Until	Ref
3 August 2005	FW	(England) Jermaine Palmer	(England) Scarborough	3 September 2005	
16 September 2005	FW	(England) Jermaine Palmer	(England) York City	16 October 2005	
15 October 2005	DF	(England) Tony Crane	(England) Worksop Town	31 December 2005	
24 November 2005	MF	(England) Terry Barwick	(England) York City	1 January 2006	
27 November 2005	MF	(England) Nick Hegarty	(England) Whitby Town	27 December 2005	
16 January 2006	MF	(England) Nick Hegarty	(England) Willenhall Town	16 March 2006	
17 January 2006	FW	(England) Jermaine Palmer	(England) Alfreton Town	17 March 2006	

== Fixtures and results ==
Grimsby Town's score shown first

=== Legend ===
Win	Draw	Loss

=== Pre-season matches ===
==== Friendlies ====
Date	Opponent	Venue	Result	Attendance	Scorers
18 July 2005	Sheffield Wednesday	Blundell Park, Cleethorpes	1–2		Hegarty
22 July 2005	Rotherham United	Blundell Park, Cleethorpes	1–1		Gritton
26 July 2005	Leeds United	Blundell Park, Cleethorpes	1–1		Reddy
31 July 2005	Lincoln City	Sincil Bank, Lincoln	1–0		Parkinson
2 August 2005	Blackburn Rovers	Blundell Park, Cleethorpes	1–2		R.Jones

==== Lincolnshire Cup ====
Date	Opponent	Venue	Result	Attendance	Scorers
14 July 2005	Scunthorpe United	Glanford Park, Scunthorpe	0–0 (Note: Scunthorpe win 4–2 on penalties)		

=== Football League Two ===
Date	Opponent	Venue	Result	Attendance	Scorers
6 August 2005	Oxford United	Blundell Park, Cleethorpes	1–1		Crane
9 August 2005	Bristol Rovers	Memorial Ground, Bristol	2–1		Gritton, R.Jones
20 August 2005	Darlington	Blundell Park, Cleethorpes	0–1		–
27 August 2005	Barnet	Underhill Stadium, Barnet, London	1–0		Andrew
29 August 2005	Rushden And Diamonds	Blundell Park, Cleethorpes	2–0		McDermott, Kalala
2 September 2005	Stockport County	Blundell Park, Cleethorpes	1–3		G.Jones
6 September 2005	Chester City	Deva Stadium, Chester	2–1		Kalala, Reddy
10 September 2005	Peterborough United	London Road, Peterborough	1–0		G.Jones
17 September 2005	Torquay United	Blundell Park, Cleethorpes	3–0		R.Jones, Reddy (2)
24 September 2005	Boston United	York Street, Boston	1–1		Kalala
27 September 2005	Notts County	Blundell Park, Cleethorpes	4–0		R.Jones, Gritton, Kalala, Cohen
1 October 2005	Shrewsbury Town	Gay Meadow, Shrewsbury	0–0		–
7 October 2005	Wycombe Wanderers	Blundell Park, Cleethorpes	0–1		–
14 October 2005	Cheltenham Town	Whaddon Road, Cheltenham	3–0		Bolland, Reddy, Cohen
22 October 2005	Leyton Orient	Blundell Park, Cleethorpes	0–1		–
29 October 2005	Northampton Town	Sixfields Stadium, Northampton	0–0		
11 November 2005	Macclesfield Town	Blundell Park, Cleethorpes	3–1		G.Jones, Newey, Cohen
19 November 2005	Wycombe Wanderers	Adams Park, Wycombe	1–3		Reddy
26 November 2005	Oxford United	Kassam Stadium, Oxford	3–2		Parkinson, Bolland, Cohen
6 December 2005	Rochdale	Blundell Park, Cleethorpes	4–1		G.Jones, Cohen, R.Jones, Reddy
10 December 2005	Bristol Rovers	Blundell Park, Cleethorpes	0–1		–
26 December 2005	Bury	Gigg Lane, Bury	2–1		G.Jones, Cohen
28 December 2005	Lincoln City	Blundell Park, Cleethorpes	3–0		Toner, Reddy, Parkinson
31 December 2005	Wrexham	The Racecourse Ground, Wrexham	2–1		Reddy, Downey
2 January 2006	Carlisle United	Blundell Park, Cleethorpes	1–2		Toner
14 January 2006	Mansfield Town	Blundell Park, Cleethorpes	2–1		Reddy, Parkinson
17 January 2006	Darlington	Blundell Park, Cleethorpes	0–0		–
21 January 2006	Torquay United	Plainmoor, Torquay	2–2		Parkinson, Futcher
24 January 2006	Stockport County	Edgeley Park, Stockport	1–2		Reddy
28 January 2006	Peterborough United	Blundell Park, Cleethorpes	1–2		Reddy
4 February 2006	Notts County	Meadow Lane, Nottingham	1–0		Reddy
11 February 2006	Boston United	Blundell Park, Cleethorpes	1–0		Reddy
14 February 2006	Mansfield Town	Field Mill, Mansfield	1–2		Woodhouse
25 February 2006	Chester City	Blundell Park, Cleethorpes	1–0		G.Jones
3 March 2006	Rushden And Diamonds	Nene Park, Irthlingborough	1–1		Futcher
11 March 2006	Barnet	Blundell Park, Cleethorpes	3–0		G.Jones (2), Bolland
18 March 2006	Bury	Blundell Park, Cleethorpes	2–1		G.Jones (2)
21 March 2006	Rochdale	Spotland, Rochdale	2–2		Toner, Bolland
25 March 2006	Lincoln City	Sincil Bank, Lincoln	0–5		–
1 April 2006	Wrexham	Blundell Park, Cleethorpes	2–0		G.Jones, Reddy
8 April 2006	Carlisle United	Brunton Park, Carlisle	0–1		–
15 April 2006	Shrewsbury Town	Blundell Park, Cleethorpes	1–1		Goodfellow
17 April 2006	Leyton Orient	Brisbane Road, Leyton, London	0–0		–
21 April 2006	Cheltenham Town	Blundell Park, Cleethorpes	1–0		G.Jones
29 April 2006	Macclesfield Town	Moss Rose, Macclesfield	1–1		G.Jones
6 May 2006	Northampton Town	Blundell Park, Cleethorpes	1–1		Kalala

==== Playoffs ====
Date	Opponent	Venue	Result	Attendance	Scorers
13 May 2006	Lincoln City	Sincil Bank, Lincoln	1–0		G.Jones
16 May 2006	Lincoln City	Blundell Park, Cleethorpes	2–1		Futcher, G.Jones
28 May 2006	Cheltenham Town	Millennium Stadium, Cardiff	0–1		–

=== FA Cup ===
Date	Opponent	Venue	Result	Attendance	Scorers
5 November 2006	Bristol Rovers	Blundell Park, Cleethorpes	1–2		G.Jones

=== League Cup ===
Date	Opponent	Venue	Result	Attendance	Scorers
28 August 2005	Derby County	Pride Park Stadium, Derby	1–0		G.Jones
20 September 2005	Tottenham Hotspur	Blundell Park, Cleethorpes	1–0		Kalala
26 October 2005	Newcastle United	Blundell Park, Cleethorpes	0–1		–

=== Football League Trophy ===
Date	Opponent	Venue	Result	Attendance	Scorers
18 October 2005	Morecambe	Blundell Park, Cleethorpes	1–1 (Note: Morecambe win 4–3 on penalties)	–	Ashton

== League table ==
Carlisle United were another side who earned a second successive promotion, only two years after a relegation from the League that some predicted would see the end of the club. Northampton Town joined them, making up for two seasons of play-off disappointment, and Leyton Orient ended a decade in the bottom division by earning promotion on nearly the last minute of the season. Wycombe started the season with a 21-game unbeaten run that saw 5 of their players named in the PFA LG2 team of the year. Two tragic off the fields events however saw them fall away in the second part of the season before losing to Cheltenham Town in the playoff semi-finals. Grimsby Town lost 1–0 to Cheltenham in the final at the Millennium Stadium.

Rushden and Diamonds failed to improve on the previous season, and paid the price with relegation to the Conference. Oxford United joined them, despite the return of manager Jim Smith, and became the first former winners of a major trophy to be relegated to the Conference.

Pos	Team	Pld	W	D	L	GF	GA	GD	Pts	Promotion, qualification or relegation
2	Northampton Town (P)	46	22	17	7	63	37	+26	83	Promotion to Football League One
3	Leyton Orient (P)	46	22	15	9	67	51	+16	81	Promotion to Football League One
4	Grimsby Town	46	22	12	12	64	44	+20	78	Qualification for League Two play-offs
5	Cheltenham Town (O, P)	46	19	15	12	65	53	+12	72	Qualification for League Two play-offs
6	Wycombe Wanderers	46	18	17	11	72	56	+16	71	Qualification for League Two play-offs

Rules for classification: In the Football League goals scored (GF) takes precedence over goal difference (GD).
(O) Play-off winners; (P) Promoted

== Coaching staff ==
Role	Nationality	Name
First-Team Manager	(England)	Russell Slade
First-Team Assistant Manager	(England)	Graham Rodger
Reserve Team Manager	(England)	Graham Rodger
Head of Youth	(England)	Neil Woods
Youth Team Manager	(England)	Neil Woods
Physiotherapist	(England)	David Moore
Community Sport Coach	(England)	Gary Childs

== Squad overview ==
Note: Flags indicate national team as defined under FIFA eligibility rules; some limited exceptions apply. Players may hold more than one non-FIFA nationality.

No.	Pos.	Nation	Player
1	GK	ENG	Steve Mildenhall
2	DF	ENG	John McDermott
3	DF	ENG	Tom Newey
4	DF	ENG	Simon Ramsden (Departed in January 2006)
5	DF	ENG	Tony Crane (Departed in January 2006)
5	DF	ENG	Ben Futcher
6	DF	ENG	Justin Whittle
7	MF	COD	Jean-Paul Kamudimba Kalala
8	MF	ENG	Paul Bolland
9	FW	IRL	Michael Reddy
10	MF	SCO	Martin Gritton (Departed in January 2006)
10	MF	ENG	Marc Goodfellow
11	MF	ENG	Andy Parkinson
12	DF	ENG	Rob Jones
13	GK	ENG	John Lukic (Departed in March 2006)
14	MF	ENG	Terry Barwick
15	MF	ENG	Gary Cohen
16	FW	ENG	Jermaine Palmer
17	DF	ENG	Glen Downey

No.	Pos.	Nation	Player
18	MF	NIR	Ciaran Toner
19	FW	ENG	Gary Jones
20	DF	ENG	Gary Croft
21	MF	ENG	Alan Lamb
22	FW	ENG	Calvin Andrew (on loan from Luton Town)
22	FW	ENG	Andy Taylor
23	MF	ENG	Nick Hegarty
24	FW	ENG	Danny North
25	MF	ENG	Paul Ashton
26	MF	ENG	Tommy Taylor (Departed in November 2005)
26	GK	ENG	Robert Murray
28	DF	ENG	Simon Francis (on loan from Sheffield United)
28	DF	ENG	Matthew Bloomer (on loan from Lincoln City)
29	DF	ENG	Miles Chamberlain
30	MF	ENG	Ben Higgins
31	FW	ENG	Steve Slade (Departed in October 2005)
31	FW	MSR	Junior Mendes (on loan from Huddersfield Town)
32	MF	ENG	Curtis Woodhouse

== First Team Squad ==
=== Appearances and goals ===
No.	Pos	Nat	Player	Total		League Two		League Cup		Football League Trophy		FA Cup	
No.	Pos	Nat	Player	Apps	Goals	Apps	Goals	Apps	Goals	Apps	Goals	Apps	Goals
1	GK	(England) ENG	Steve Mildenhall	54	0	49	0	3	0	1	0	1	0
2	DF	(England) ENG	John McDermott	37	1	32	1	3	0	1	0	1	0
3	DF	(England) ENG	Tom Newey	43	1	40	1	1	0	1	0	1	0
4	DF	(England) ENG	Simon Ramsden	15	0	12	0	1	0	1	0	1	0
5	DF	(England) ENG	Tony Crane	6	1	5	1	0	0	1	0	0	0
5	DF	(England) ENG	Ben Futcher	18	2	18	2	0	0	0	0	0	0
6	DF	(England) ENG	Justin Whittle	41	1	37	1	3	0	1	0	0	0
7	MF	(Democratic Republic of the Congo) COD	Jean-Paul Kamudimba Kalala	25	6	21	5	3	1	1	0	0	0
8	MF	(England) ENG	Paul Bolland	51	4	47	4	3	0	0	0	1	0
9	FW	(Republic of Ireland) IRL	Michael Reddy	51	14	47	14	3	0	1	0	0	0
10	FW	(Scotland) SCO	Martin Gritton	30	2	26	2	2	0	1	0	1	0
10	MF	(England) ENG	Marc Goodfellow	11	1	11	1	0	0	0	0	0	0
11	MF	(England) ENG	Andy Parkinson	47	4	43	4	3	0	0	0	1	0
12	DF	(England) ENG	Rob Jones	46	4	42	4	3	0	0	0	1	0
13	GK	(England) ENG	John Lukic jnr	0	0	0	0	0	0	0	0	0	0
14	MF	(England) ENG	Terry Barwick	11	0	8	0	2	0	1	0	0	0
15	MF	(England) ENG	Gary Cohen	48	6	43	6	3	0	1	0	1	0
16	FW	(England) ENG	Jermaine Palmer	1	0	0	0	0	0	1	0	0	0
17	DF	(England) ENG	Glen Downey	3	1	2	1	1	0	0	0	0	0
18	MF	(Northern Ireland) NIR	Ciaran Toner	34	3	34	3	0	0	0	0	0	0
19	FW	(England) ENG	Gary Jones	47	17	43	15	3	1	0	0	1	1
20	DF	(England) ENG	Gary Croft	37	0	36	0	1	0	0	0	0	0
21	MF	(England) ENG	Alan Lamb	0	0	0	0	0	0	0	0	0	0
22	FW	(England) ENG	Calvin Andrew (on loan from Luton Town)	9	1	8	1	1	0	0	0	0	0
22	FW	(England) ENG	Andy Taylor	0	0	0	0	0	0	0	0	0	0
23	MF	(England) ENG	Nick Hegarty	3	0	2	0	0	0	1	0	0	0
24	FW	(England) ENG	Danny North	1	0	1	0	0	0	0	0	0	0
25	MF	(England) ENG	Paul Ashton	1	1	0	0	0	0	1	1	0	0
26	MF	(England) ENG	Tommy Taylor	0	0	0	0	0	0	0	0	0	0
26	GK	(England) ENG	Robert Murray	0	0	0	0	0	0	0	0	0	0
28	DF	(England) ENG	Simon Francis (on loan from Sheffield United)	6	0	5	0	0	0	1	0	0	0
28	DF	(England) ENG	Matthew Bloomer (on loan from Lincoln City)	3	0	3	0	0	0	0	0	0	0
29	DF	(England) ENG	Miles Chamberlain	1	0	0	0	0	0	1	0	0	0
30	DF	(England) ENG	Ben Higgins	0	0	0	0	0	0	0	0	0	0
31	FW	(England) ENG	Steve Slade	1	0	0	0	0	0	1	0	0	0
31	MF	(Montserrat) MSR	Junior Mendes (on loan from Huddersfield Town)	20	0	20	0	0	0	0	0	0	0
32	MF	(England) ENG	Curtis Woodhouse	19	1	19	1	0	0	0	0	0	0
