= Terry Barwick =

English footballer

Personal information
- Full name: Terence Patrick Barwick
- Date of birth: 11 January 1983 (age 43)
- Place of birth: Sheffield, England
- Position: Midfielder

Youth career
- 1998–2000: Scunthorpe United

Senior career*
Years	Team	Apps	(Gls)
2000–2005	Scunthorpe United	46	(1)
2005–2006	Grimsby Town	8	(0)
2005–2006	→ York City (loan)	3	(0)
2006–2007	Northwich Victoria	21	(0)
2007–2009	Stalybridge Celtic	89	(6)
2009	Retford United	18	(5)
2009–2010	Goole	10	(2)
2010	Droylsden	1	(0)
2010–2011	Goole		
2011	Worksop Town		
2011–2012	Goole		
2012–2013	Frickley Athletic		
2013–2017	Bottesford Town		
2017–2020	Goole		

Managerial career
- 2018–2020: Goole.
- * Club domestic league appearances and goals as of 20:37, 11 March 2010 (UTC)

Terence Patrick Barwick (born 11 January 1983) is an English football manager and former professional footballer.

As a player he was a midfielder who played between 2000 and 2020. He played as a professional in the Football League for Scunthorpe United and Grimsby Town, before going on to play in non-League football for York City, Northwich Victoria, Stalybridge Celtic, Retford United, Droylsden, Worksop Town, Frickley Athletic, Bottesford Town and most notably Goole where he spent four spells at between 2009 and 2020. In 2018 he was appointed joint manager at Goole, a position which he resigned from fourteen months later.

== Playing career ==
=== Scunthorpe United ===
Sheffield born Barwick came through the youth ranks of Scunthorpe United and was added to the first team squad in the final months of the 1999–2000 campaign. He made his debut in the club's 2–1 league defeat against Burnley when he came on as 46th-minute substitute for Justin Walker. Though he only played a cameo role in his five years at the Glanford Park, he was highly thought of by the club's supporters. He learned the ropes under first team manager Brian Laws and his assistant Russ Wilcox. Barwick was bred from the same youth side that featured Matthew Sparrow and Andy Butler and like the pair and other players who come through United's youth ranks, he did well enough to keep himself at the club for a reasonable period. His performances earned him a new one-year contract in both May 2003 and again in 2004. Barwick was to only make the single appearance for the club in the 2004–05 promotion winning campaign and at the end of the season he was deemed surplus to requirements and was released by the club.

=== Grimsby Town ===
Following his release from Scunthorpe, Russell Slade made him one of the first new names to sign for Grimsby Town in preparation for the 2005–06 season. Despite joining The Mariners on a two-year deal and having arrived with praise from his former management staff at Scunthorpe, Barwick struggled to find his feet at Blundell Park and found himself looked over in favour of players such as Paul Bolland, Ciaran Toner and Jean-Paul Kamudimba Kalala. He did notably appear for The Mariners in their 1–0 League Cup victory over Tottenham Hotspur. Barwick found it hard to settle at Grimsby and some fans had given him a tough time over the fact he was a former player of rival club Scunthorpe, and the fact his performances were average never helped his cause. This in turn allowed Slade to loan him too Conference National side York City in November 2005. where he made three appearances. Barwick returned to Grimsby in January 2006 but continued to struggle in terms of gaining any run in the first team. The Mariners started the 2006–07 season under different command, when Russell Slade left the club, and in stepped his assistant Graham Rodger. As far as first team chances went, there was no difference .It was clear from as early as pre-season that Barwick was not among the plans of the new manager and he was transfer listed. It wasn't long before he was allowed to leave the club, and his two-year contract was cancelled when he signed for Northwich Victoria a couple of weeks into the new season in August.

=== Non-League ===
He made a permanent move to the Conference when he joined Northwich Victoria in August 2006 and finished the 2006–07 season with 21 appearances. He was signed by former Northwich manager Steve Burr at Stalybridge Celtic in June. Barwick was released by Celtic after the conclusion of the 2008–09 season, and signed for Northern Premier League side Retford United. In December 2009, Barwick joined Goole A.F.C. and then moved onto Droylsden. In the summer of 2010 he moved back to Goole AFC.

In March 2011 he signed for Worksop Town, before moving back to Goole AFC for a third time in October 2011. In July 2012 he signed with Frickley Athletic. In the summer of 2013 he moved on to Bottesford Town. On 20 July 2017 he returned to Goole for a fourth time.

== Managerial career ==
In December 2018 he was appointed joint manager of the club alongside Matty Bloor. The two resigned in February 2020.

== Career statistics ==
Club performance
Club	Season	League	Level	League		FA Cup		League Cup		FL Trophy		Total	
Club	Season	League	Level	Apps	Goals	Apps	Goals	Apps	Goals	Apps	Goals	Apps	Goals
Scunthorpe United	1999–00	Second Division	3	1	0	0	0	0	0	0	0	1	0
Scunthorpe United	2000–01	Third Division	4	0	0	0	0	0	0	0	0	0	0
Scunthorpe United	2001–02	Third Division	4	10	0	0	0	1	0	1	0	12	0
Scunthorpe United	2002–03	Third Division	4	5	0	0	0	1	0	0	0	6	0
Scunthorpe United	2003–04	Third Division	4	30	1	6	0	1	0	4	0	41	1
Scunthorpe United	2004–05	League Two	4	1	0	0	0	0	0	0	0	1	0
Grimsby Town	2005–06	League Two	4	8	0	0	0	2	0	1	0	11	0
Grimsby Town	2006–07	League Two	4	0	0	0	0	0	0	0	0	0	0
York City (loan)	2005–06	Conference National	5	3	0	0	0	0	0	0	0	3	0
Northwich Victoria	2006–07	Conference National	5	21	0	0	0	0	0	0	0	21	0
Stalybridge Celtic	2007–08	Conference North	6	42	1	2	0	0	0	0	0	44	1
Stalybridge Celtic	2008–09	Conference North	6	41	6	2	0	0	0	0	0	43	6
Retford United	2009–10	NPL Premier	7	18	5	0	0	0	0	0	0	18	5
Goole AFC	2009–10	NPL Division One South	8	3	0	0	0	0	0	0	0	3	0
Droylsden	2010–	Conference North	6	1	0	0	0	0	0	0	0	0	0

== Honours ==
=== Scunthorpe United ===
- League Two promotion: 2004–05
