= Nick Fenton =

English footballer

Personal information
- Full name: Nicholas Leonard Fenton
- Date of birth: 23 November 1979 (age 46)
- Place of birth: Preston, England
- Position: Defender

Team information
- Current team: Coventry City (head physio)

Youth career
- 1993–1996: Manchester City

Senior career*
Years	Team	Apps	(Gls)
1996–2001	Manchester City	15	(0)
1999–2000	→ Notts County (loan)	13	(1)
2000	→ AFC Bournemouth (loan)	8	(0)
2000	→ AFC Bournemouth (loan)	5	(0)
2000	→ Notts County (loan)	8	(0)
2000–2004	Notts County	147	(9)
2004–2006	Doncaster Rovers	63	(4)
2006–2008	Grimsby Town	80	(6)
2008–2011	Rotherham United	115	(4)
2011–2013	Morecambe	73	(4)
2013–2014	Alfreton Town	32	(3)
Total		559	(31)

International career
- Wales U15
1998	England U18	6	(0)
- * Club domestic league appearances and goals

Nicholas Leonard Fenton (born 23 November 1979) is an English former professional footballer and head physiotherapist of Premier League side Coventry City.

As a player, he was as a defender who played between 1996 and 2014. He played for Manchester City, Notts County, AFC Bournemouth, Doncaster Rovers, Grimsby Town, Rotherham United and Morecambe and Alfreton Town.

== Club career ==
=== Manchester City ===
Preston born Fenton came through the youth ranks of Premiership side Manchester City. Though born in England, as he went to a school in Wales he represented Wales at schoolboy level, captaining the under-15 side. He was called up by England at both under-16 and under-18 level. He was promoted to the Manchester City first team squad a few months after the club's relegation in the summer of 1996. By the time Fenton was given his first team debut City had suffered a further relegation into the third tier of English football. On 19 August 1998 Fenton earned his first appearance for City when he started the match in a 7–1 English League Cup victory over Notts County at Maine Road. City earned promotion back to the First Division in May 1999 via the play-offs following a penalty shootout victory over Gillingham at Wembley Stadium, however Fenton although a squad member had not been involved in first team action since February. During the 1999–2000 season Fenton made his final appearance for City in a 4–3 League Cup defeat against Southampton when he came on as a 91st-minute substitute for Richard Edghill. In October 1999 he joined Notts County on loan where he made 13 appearances and scoring his first career goal against Wycombe Wanderers. In March 2000 he signed on loan with AFC Bournemouth where he played 8 times where his performances proved himself worthy of a fresh bid by the club in the 2000–01 season and he returned on loan to Bournemouth in August. Fenton returned to Notts County on loan a month later and on 10 November he joined the club on a permanent deal.

=== Notts County ===
Fenton signed for County for £150,000. Fenton played over 150 appearances for The Magpies until his departure at the end of the 2003–04 season.

=== Doncaster Rovers ===
His next port of call was to sign with Doncaster Rovers who had previously earned two back to back promotions that had seen the Yorkshire club rise from the Conference National to the Football League One. Fenton played out the 2004–05 and 2005–06 seasons Rovers and after playing in the club's first round League Cup game against Rochdale at the beginning of the 2006–07 season he departed the club.

=== Grimsby Town ===
Fenton was signed for Grimsby on 25 August 2006 by Graham Rodger from Doncaster Rovers, the same day that centre half Ben Futcher left the club for Peterborough United. Fenton was joined at Blundell Park by Rovers teammate Ricky Ravenhill. He slotted in at centre half along with Justin Whittle, as the season progressed manager Rodger was replaced by Alan Buckley but he continued to feature as a regular. On the final day of the season he had the distinction of scoring the last ever goal at Shrewsbury Town's Gay Meadow stadium. During the 2007–08 season Fenton was a part of the Grimsby team that made it to the Football League Trophy final at Wembley Stadium, however the club were beaten 2–0 by the Milton Keynes Dons. In the summer of 2008 Fenton was told that he would not be offered a new contract with Grimsby and that he was free to leave the club.

=== Rotherham United ===
Fenton was signed by Rotherham United on 8 August 2008 on a free transfer He made his Rotherham United debut away to local rivals Sheffield Wednesday. He had a brilliant game and was given a 9 rating in most match reports. He made his league debut for the Millers away to Morecambe. He scored his first goal for the club when Rotherham caused an upset by beating Championship side Southampton in the League Cup. Fenton kept up his goal scoring form by scoring further goals against Leeds United in the Football League Trophy and Barnet in the league. He was released by the club in May 2011.

=== Morecambe ===
He joined League Two side Morecambe in summer 2011 where he enjoyed two mid-table seasons for the Shrimps before leaving early in April 2013 to continue in his physiotherapy training and to find a new club.

=== Alfreton Town ===
On 2 August 2013 he signed a contract with Alfreton Town until the end of the 2013-14 season, after impressing in pre-season. Having made 32 league appearances and scored three goals, Fenton was released by Alfreton at the end of the 2013–14 season.

== Career statistics ==
Appearances and goals by club, season and competition
Club	Season	League			FA Cup		League Cup		Other		Total	
Club	Season	Division	Apps	Goals	Apps	Goals	Apps	Goals	Apps	Goals	Apps	Goals
Manchester City	1996–97	Division One	0	0	0	0	0	0	0	0	0	0
Manchester City	1997–98	Division One	0	0	0	0	0	0	0	0	0	0
Manchester City	1998–99	Division Two	15	0	0	0	3	0	1 (Note: Appearance(s) in Football League Trophy)	0	19	0
Manchester City	1999–2000	Division One	0	0	0	0	1	0	0	0	1	0
→ Notts County (loan)	1999–2000	Division Two	13	1	0	0	0	0	1	0	14	1
→ AFC Bournemouth (loan)	1999–2000	Division Two	8	0	0	0	0	0	0	0	8	0
Manchester City	2000–01	Premier League	0	0	0	0	0	0	0	0	0	0
→ AFC Bournemouth (loan)	2000–01	Division Two	5	0	0	0	0	0	0	0	5	0
→ Notts County (loan)	2000–01	Division Two	8	0	0	0	1	0	0	0	9	0
Notts County	2000–01	Division Two	22	2	5	0	0	0	0	0	27	2
Notts County	2001–02	Division Two	42	3	3	0	2	0	2	0	49	3
Notts County	2002–03	Division Two	40	3	1	0	1	0	2	0	43	3
Notts County	2003–04	Division Two	43	1	3	2	3	0	1	0	50	3
Doncaster Rovers	2004–05	League One	38	1	2	1	3	0	2	0	45	2
Doncaster Rovers	2005–06	League One	25	3	3	0	3	0	2	0	33	3
Doncaster Rovers	2006–07	League One	0	0	0	0	1	0	0	0	1	0
Grimsby Town	2006–07	League Two	38	4	2	0	0	0	2	0	42	4
Grimsby Town	2007–08	League Two	42	2	3	0	1	0	7	1	53	3
Rotherham United	2008–09	League Two	45	1	2	0	4	1	5	1	56	3
Rotherham United	2009–10	League Two	38	0	2	0	2	0	0	0	42	0
Rotherham United	2010–11	League Two	32	3	2	0	0	0	2	0	36	3
Morecambe	2011–12	League Two	35	3	1	0	1	0	1	0	38	3
Morecambe	2012–13	League Two	38	1	3	0	1	0	2	0	44	1
Alfreton Town	2013–14	Conference Premier	32	3	1	0	0	0	0	0	33	3
Career total			559	31	33	3	27	1	30	2	649	37

== International career ==
As a youngster Fenton captained Wales under-15s and was called up by England at under-16 and under-18 level.

== Physiotherapist ==
Following his release by Alfreton, Fenton retired from the playing side of the sport and was hired by Burton Albion as the club's team physiotherapist for the 2014-15 season.

In 2019, whilst working as a physio for Burton in a game against Barnsley he helped to save the life of a Barnsley team volunteer. He was awarded an Exceptional Service Award at the Football Medicine and Performance Association Awards 2019.

== Personal life ==
His twin brother Anthony Fenton is currently the assistant manager of club Sutton United.

== Honours ==
Manchester City

- Football League Second Division play-offs: 1999
- Football League First Division runner-up: 1999–2000

Grimsby Town

- Football League Trophy runner-up: 2007–08
