= Tom Newey =

English footballer

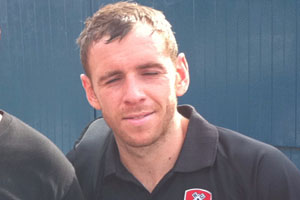
- Newey with Rotherham United in 2010

Personal information
- Full name: Thomas William Newey
- Date of birth: 31 October 1982 (age 43)
- Place of birth: Huddersfield, England
- Height: 5 ft 10 in (1.78 m)
- Position: Defender

Team information
- Current team: Leeds United (Under 15s & Under 16s Coach)

Youth career
- 2001–2002: Leeds United

Senior career*
Years	Team	Apps	(Gls)
2002–2003	Leeds United	0	(0)
2003	→ Cambridge United (loan)	6	(0)
2003	→ Darlington (loan)	7	(1)
2003–2005	Leyton Orient	54	(3)
2005	→ Cambridge United (loan)	6	(0)
2005	Cambridge United	10	(0)
2005–2009	Grimsby Town	150	(3)
2009	→ Rochdale (loan)	2	(0)
2009–2010	Bury	32	(0)
2010–2012	Rotherham United	58	(0)
2012–2013	Scunthorpe United	45	(0)
2013–2015	Oxford United	52	(1)
2014–2015	→ Northampton Town (loan)	2	(0)
2015–2017	Northampton Town	7	(0)
Total		431	(8)
- * Club domestic league appearances and goals

Thomas William Newey (born 31 October 1982) is an English former professional footballer, commentator and football coach who is the Under 15s & Under 16s Coach at Leeds United.

As a player he was a left-back from 2002 to 2017. He could also operate as a centre half. He played for Leeds United, Cambridge United, Darlington, Leyton Orient, Grimsby Town, Rochdale, Bury, Rotherham United, Scunthorpe United, Oxford United and Northampton Town.

== Club career ==
=== Leeds United ===
Born in Huddersfield, West Yorkshire, Newey began his career as a trainee with Leeds United in August 2002. He was loaned to Cambridge United in February 2003 where he made seven league and cup appearances, and was then loaned to Darlington in March 2003 where he also made seven appearances, scoring one goal. He was offered a permanent contract by Darlington in May 2003 but turned it down.

=== Leyton Orient ===
After being released by Leeds, Newey joined Leyton Orient in July 2003, where he went on to make 63 appearances, scoring three goals. Following a loan spell with Cambridge United, he joined the club on a permanent basis in March 2005.

=== Cambridge United ===
After joining Cambridge late in the 2004–05 campaign, Newey made 16 appearances for Cambridge in their failed bid to fight off relegation and was released after Cambridge were relegated from the Football League.

=== Grimsby Town ===
Newey signed a one-year contract with Grimsby Town in June 2005 and was one of the first new signings under Grimsby's new boss at the time, Russell Slade. He made 43 league and cup appearances for Grimsby in the 2005–06 season as Grimsby challenged for promotion only to lose out in the play-off final. Newey managed to keep down a regular spot at left back, despite having stiff competition from veteran Gary Croft. Slade departed Blundell Park at the end of the season, but new manager Graham Rodger convinced Newey to sign a new three-year contract with the club in the summer of 2006. Grimsby struggled in the new season, and Rodger was replaced by Alan Buckley. Newey continued to keep his place and he made a further 46 league and cup appearances in the 2006–07 season. In the 2007–08 campaign, Newey became the club's interim captain as veteran Justin Whittle spent the majority of the campaign on the substitute bench. That season, he was part of the squad that reached the final of the Football League Trophy at Wembley Stadium. Grimsby lost the game 2–0 to the MK Dons.

Following Buckley's dismissal in September 2008, Newey re-established himself under new manager Mike Newell until a mid-season injury halted his first-team aspirations. Newell moved to sign West Ham United left back Joe Widdowson in his absence. On his return to fitness, Grimsby accepted an approach by rivals Lincoln City to take Newey on loan; however, the player rejected the chance of playing at Sincil Bank due to his fitness levels not being adequate to merit a first-team place. Newey returned to first-team action a few weeks later, but found himself out of favour, with Newell preferring to use Widdowson, freezing the long-term Grimsby left back out of his regular spot in the team. On 17 March 2009, Newey was told he could leave the club on a free transfer along with goalkeepers Phil Barnes and Gary Montgomery. Although Barnes and Montgomery both left, Newey was loaned out to Rochdale for the remaining month of the 2008–09 season. On 30 April Newey was told along with Peter Till that they would not be offered a new contract for the 2009–10 season. Newey was also told by Rochdale a few days later that he would not be invited to join the club for the new season, something he had expressed his desire to do after admitting enjoying working alongside Dale players, and former Grimsby teammates Simon Ramsden and Ciaran Toner.

=== Bury and Rotherham United ===
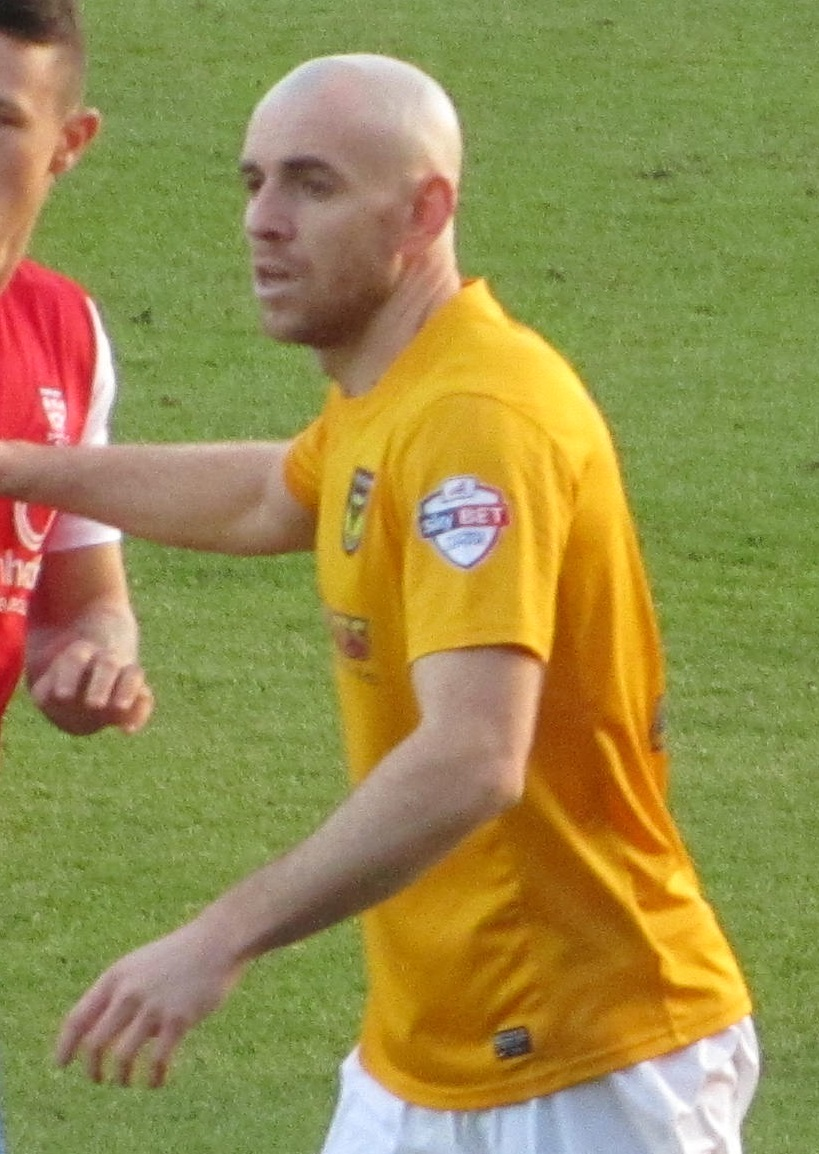
Newey playing for Oxford United in 2013

On 28 August 2009 Newey signed a twelve-month contract with Bury following a successful trial spell with the club. Newey played 32 times for Bury in the league before leaving at the end of the 2009–10 season. Newey signed for fellow Football League Two side Rotherham United in the summer of 2010. He was released by Rotherham in May 2012.

=== Scunthorpe United ===
In July 2012 he joined Scunthorpe United on trial. Newey and Scunthorpe were relegated to League Two in May 2013; despite his initially being offered a new deal, the club signed Andy Dawson and released Newey.

=== Oxford United ===
On 4 July 2013, Newey joined Oxford United on a free transfer. In his first season with the club, Newey made 40 league starts and was the Oxford's first-choice left-back. He scored his first goal for the club against AFC Wimbledon on 1 February 2014. Newey was awarded with a new one-year contract on 27 May 2014. On 30 October 2014, Newey joined Northampton Town on loan until 3 January 2015. On 26 January 2015, Newey was released from his contract.

=== Northampton Town ===
On 27 January 2015, Newey joined Northampton Town on a free transfer until the end of the 2014–15 season.

== Coaching career ==
Newey retired from professional football due to injury in 2017 and joined the coaching staff at Rotherham United as an academy coach. He has also obtained his UEFA A and B coaching licence. He is also a coach at Queen Ethelburgas Collegiate alongside his former Grimsby teammate Paul Bolland.

In July 2017, Newey joined his old club Leeds United as Under 15s & Under 16s Coach.

== Honours ==
Grimsby Town

- Football League Trophy runner-up: 2007–08
