= Ricky Ravenhill =

English footballer

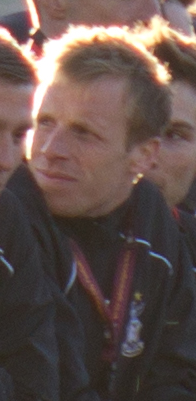
- Ravenhill with the victory parade that followed Bradford City's victory in the 2013 Football League Two play-off final

Personal information
- Full name: Richard John Ravenhill
- Date of birth: 16 January 1981 (age 45)
- Place of birth: Doncaster, England
- Position: Midfielder

Team information
- Current team: Grimsby Borough (manager)

Youth career
- 1998–2000: Barnsley

Senior career*
Years	Team	Apps	(Gls)
2000–2002	Barnsley	0	(0)
2000	→ Napier City Rovers (loan)		
2002–2006	Doncaster Rovers	137	(9)
2006	→ Chester City (loan)	3	(0)
2006–2007	Grimsby Town	17	(2)
2007	→ Darlington (loan)	15	(1)
2007–2009	Darlington	75	(5)
2009–2012	Notts County	79	(3)
2011–2012	→ Bradford City (loan)	6	(0)
2012–2014	Bradford City	49	(2)
2013	→ Northampton Town (loan)	6	(0)
2014–2015	Northampton Town	31	(0)
2015	Mansfield Town	13	(0)
2015–2018	Buxton		
2018–2021	Mickleover		

Managerial career
- 2026: Matlock Town
- 2026–: Grimsby Borough
- * Club domestic league appearances and goals as of 15:22, 6 June 2015 (UTC)

Richard John Ravenhill (born 16 January 1981) is an English former professional footballer and manager. He is currently manager of Northern Premier League Division One East club Grimsby Borough.

As a player, he was a midfielder, who began his professional career with Barnsley in 2000 after a short spell with New Zealand club Napier City Rovers. Ravenhill was released midway through the 2001–02 season and transferred to the then non-league side Doncaster Rovers. In his second season with Rovers, the club were promoted from the Conference having beaten Dagenham & Redbridge in the 2003 Football Conference play-off final. The following season brought more joy as Rovers secured back to back promotions by winning the Third Division to insure they would be playing in the third division of English football for the 2004–05 season. In 2006, he transferred to Grimsby Town but his stay was short-lived, and by the end of the season he had moved on again, this time joining Darlington. In July 2009 he joined Notts County and his first season with the club brought promotion and his second league title in the fourth tier. In late 2011 he moved on loan to Bradford City which a month later brought a permanent move. During the 2012–13 season Ravenhill and Bradford were runners-up in the Football League Cup.

== Career ==
=== Barnsley ===
Born in Doncaster, Ravenhill came through the youth academy at Barnsley, joining the first team setup in 2000 under the managerial tenure of Dave Bassett after a short spell with New Zealand club Napier City Rovers alongside fellow Barnsley youth prospect Paul Jackson. Ravenhill and Jackson helped the club to the National Soccer League and Chatham Cup double. Bassett was dismissed early into Ravenhill's time at Oakwell and was replaced by Nigel Spackman. Despite being on the fringes of first team football at the beginning of the 2001–02 season, Ravenhill was allowed to leave the club in January 2002 by The Tykes new manager Steve Parkin.

=== Doncaster Rovers ===
Ravenhill signed for Conference side Doncaster Rovers on 24 January 2002 on a free transfer. He made his full professional debut on 19 February 2002 against in a 1–1 draw with Yeovil Town in the FA Trophy. On 2 March he made his league debut in a 3–2 away win over Nuneaton Borough. Ravenhill ended the 2001–02 season with 11 appearances in all competitions. During the following season Ravenhill and Doncaster earned promotion after beating Dagenham & Redbridge in the 2003 Football Conference play-off final. The win secured Doncaster's return to the Football League after a five-year absence. The 2003–04 season brought Ravenhill's first senior career goal as he scored the fourth in a 5–0 victory over Kidderminster Harriers on 27 February 2004. He netted again twice against Yeovil Town and Bristol Rovers before the end of the season which brought a second back to back promotion with Doncaster going up as champions of the Third Division.

Doncaster began the 2004–05 season in a third division in as many seasons. The Second Division over the summer had become Football League One and Ravenhill finished the season with 4 goals from 41 appearances in all competitions, with Rovers finishing the season in 10th position and only 5 points off a play-off spot. Doncaster consolidated their stance in the third tier of English football the following season and at the beginning of the 2006–07 season Ravenhill was loaned out to Chester City for 1 month. He made his Chester debut on 8 August 2006 in a 3–1 win away at Bury, however in his third game for the club he was sent off against Wrexham. The sending off meant he was suspended for the remainder of the month loan spell and the Wrexham game would be his last for Chester.

=== Grimsby Town ===
On 8 September 2006 Ravenhill and fellow Doncaster player Nick Fenton moved to Grimsby Town on free transfers. Ravenhill made his Mariners debut the following day in a 2–1 victory at home to Walsall, on 29 September he scored his first goal in a 2–2 draw away at Darlington. Grimsby who had suffered defeat in the League Two play-off final in the previous season eventually sacked manager Graham Rodger after a slow start to the new campaign and the club moved to re-appoint former manager Alan Buckley. The managerial change brought a down turn in fortunes for Ravenhill who fell out of contention following the loan signing of Peter Till from Birmingham City. He played his final game for Grimsby on 9 January 2007 in a 2–0 home defeat against former club Chester.

=== Darlington ===
His departure from Grimsby was initially on loan and he joined fellow League Two side Darlington on loan until the end of the 2006–07 season, Ravenhill who has scored for Grimsby against Darlo earlier in the season made his debut on 16 January 2007 in a 1–1 draw with Bury. He finished the spell with 2 goals in 15 games. In the summer of 2007 a permanent deal was finalised between Grimsby and Darlington and he became a full-time player with the club. Over the next two seasons Ravenhill went on to make 75 league appearances, scoring 5 goals.

=== Notts County ===
In the summer of 2009 Ravenhill joined Notts County who were in the middle of the takeover by Middle Eastern consortium Munto Finance. County were to bring in Sven-Göran Eriksson as director of football, as well as players such as Sol Campbell, Kasper Schmeichel and Lee Hughes. County, Munto and Sven despite all the media hype around the club had parted company before the 2009–10 season had seen its climax and to add to the confusion the club had seen five different managers in charge throughout the season. Ian McParland who signed Ravenhill during the summer was dismissed in October, and after Michael Johnson was placed in temporary charge the board appointed Hans Backe. Backe himself resigned in December after two months in charge and was replaced by Dave Kevan for a two-month period before Steve Cotterill took over for the remaining 18 games which eventually brought promotion with the club winning the League Two title. Ravenhill was an imperative part of the club's promotion push after playing in 48 games in all competitions, scoring 3 goals against Macclesfield Town, Burton Albion and Morecambe.

The following year there was less money in the pot at Meadow Lane and County struggled with life in League One but eventually staved off relegation by finishing in 19th place, 3 points above the relegation zone. Ravenhill played 42 times in all competitions without scoring. He played his final game for County against Wycombe Wanderers on 5 November 2011.

=== Bradford City ===
He joined Bradford City on loan on 18 November 2011. He made his debut the following day in a home match against Rotherham United. On 12 January 2012 the deal was made permanent, he continued to wear the number 14 shirt and was given a 2 1/2-year contract. He scored his first goal for the club on 14 January in a home match against Morecambe. Bradford's 2012–13 season though made by the club's outstanding run in the Football League Cup. Victories over Watford and Burton Albion brought a tie at home with Premier League side Wigan Athletic. Bradford stunned Wigan by beating them on a penalty shootout after a 0–0 draw at Valley Parade, this set up another home tie, this time with Arsenal who again Bradford beat on a penalty shootout, this time following a 1–1 draw. Bradford went on to knock Aston Villa out 4–3 in the semi-final to make themselves only the second team from the fourth tier of English football to qualify for a national cup final. Bradford however were beaten 5–0 by Swansea City at Wembley Stadium on 24 February 2013, Ravenhill was an unused sub for the quarter finals, both semi final legs and the final itself.

On 6 November 2013, Ricky joined Northampton Town on a month-long loan.

=== Northampton Town ===
On 30 January 2014, Ravenhill joined Northampton Town on an 18-month contract.

=== Later career ===
On 7 January 2015 Ravenhill joined Mansfield Town FC on a deal until 1 July 2015.

On 9 August 2015 Ravenhill joined Buxton FC. Ravenhill decided to retire from professional football, currently splitting his time between playing non-professionally for Buxton, coaching at Doncaster Rovers Youth Academy and working full-time as a recruitment consultant.

On 25 September 2018, Mickleover Sports announced the signing of Ravenhill.

== Coaching career ==
In May 2024, Ravenhill joined National League North club Buxton as assistant manager following the appointment of John McGrath. He departed the club by mutual consent in February 2025.

In July 2025, he joined Brighouse Town as assistant manager.

Having initially joined the club as assistant manager, he was appointed joint-manager of Matlock Town in July 2026 after manager Ryan Cresswell was appointed under-18s lead coach with Doncaster Rovers. Later that month however, prior to the commencement of the season, Cresswell's departure was announced with Ravenhill taking on the sole manager job. On 22 August 2026, he was sacked by the club.

On 28 September 2026, Ravenhill was appointed manager of Northern Premier League Division One East club Grimsby Borough.

== Personal life ==
His son Liam Ravenhill plays as a midfielder.

== Honours ==
Doncaster Rovers

- Football League Third Division: 2003–04
- Conference National play-offs: 2003

Notts County

- Football League Two: 2009–10

Bradford City

- Football League Two play-offs: 2013
- Football League Cup runner-up: 2012–13
