= National Soccer League (indoor) =

- Sport: Indoor Soccer
- Founded: 2003
- Country: United States Canada
- Most recent champion: n/a
- Website: nationalsoccerleague.com

The National Soccer League was a proposed professional indoor soccer league with oft-delayed start dates from June 2004 to Summer 2008. The league played two "NSL Select" games in Laredo, Texas (2005) and Cleveland (2006) to test interest.

The National Soccer League spent many years in development. On March 27, 2003, its website touted 20 regular-season games from June to September 2004. By May 23, 2003, the time frame had shifted to June–September 2005, and by January 30, 2004, the league was planning to play 20 regular-season games from June to September 2006. The league also explored the possibility of having a separate Canadian league that would have played in the winter.

On December 6, 2004, the league issued a release that it was setting a deadline for owners to establish teams for its first season, which would be played in 2006. "We've been very diligent about taking our time putting this league together," said NSL President Sydney Nusinov in the release. "You only get one shot at a successful launch and we want our league and teams to have a healthy base from which to grow and so we have set up a very strict timeline that must be followed." Exactly one year later, on December 6, 2005, the first season was pushed back to 2007, but with exactly the same comment from the league president in the release.

On April 11, 2006, the NSL issued yet another release pegging the start of its first season at 2008, and this time included a different quote from its president: "We're making this sacrifice now for the long-term viability of the league once it's fully operational," said NSL President Sydney Nusinov. "It's better that these short term losses come out of my pocket than for long term losses to come out of our owners' pockets."

Doubt about the eventual play of the NSL solidified in May 2008 when NSL President Sydney Nusinov was named Director of Media Relations for the new Professional Arena Soccer League.
