= Jermaine Palmer =

English footballer (born 1986)

Personal information
- Full name: Jermaine Ashley Clifton Palmer
- Date of birth: 28 August 1986 (age 40)
- Place of birth: Derby, England
- Position: Striker

Youth career
- 2000–2002: Stoke City

Senior career*
| Years | Team | Apps | (Gls) |
| 2003–2005 | Stoke City | 4 | (0) |
| 2004 | → Víkingur (loan) | 8 | (3) |
| 2005 | → Hinckley United (loan) | 9 | (4) |
| 2005–2006 | Grimsby Town | 0 | (0) |
| 2005 | → Scarborough (loan) | 4 | (0) |
| 2005 | → York City (loan) | 4 | (0) |
| 2006 | → Alfreton Town (loan) | 10 | (1) |
| 2006 | Grantham Town | 4 | (3) |
| 2006 | Hinckley United | | |
| 2006–2007 | Halesowen Town | 9 | (3) |
| 2007–2008 | Ilkeston Town | | |
| 2008 | Worksop Town | | |
| 2008 | Halesowen Town | | |
| 2008–2009 | Corby Town | | |
| 2009 | Holbeach United | | |
| 2009 | Quorn | | |
| 2009 | Weymouth | 7 | (0) |
| 2009–2010 | Boston Town | | |
| 2010 | Ilkeston Town | 5 | (1) |
| 2010–2011 | Holbeach United | | |
| 2014 | Long Eaton United | | |
| 2014–2017 | Holbeach United | | |
| 2017–2018 | Holbrook Sports | | |
| 2018 | Kimberley Miners Welfare | | |
- * Club domestic league appearances and goals as of 21:46, 24 February 2019

Jermaine Ashley Clifton Palmer (born 28 August 1986) is an English former professional footballer who played as a striker.

He played professionally for Stoke City, Grimsby Town and Icelandic side Vikingur, with loan stints at York City, Scarborough and Alfreton Town. Between 2006 and 2018, Palmer was a non-league journeyman who played for Grantham Town, Hinckley United, Halesowen Town, Corby Town, Holbeach United, Quorn, Weymouth, Boston Town, Ilkeston Town, Long Eaton United, Holbrook Sports and Kimberley Miners Welfare.

== Career ==
Palmer was born in Derby and progressed through the academy at Stoke City, signing a professional contract in the summer of 2003. He made three substitute appearances for Stoke in 2003–04 and was loaned out to Icelandic club Víkingur where he scored three goals in eight matches in the summer of 2004. On his return to England, Palmer found himself loaned out again, this time spending time with Hinckley United. He made one appearance for Stoke in 2004–05 coming on as a sub in a 1–0 defeat at home to Sunderland.

He then joined Grimsby Town on trial and Mariners manager Russell Slade took a closer look at him as he participated in the club's reserve cup quarter final tie with Manchester United. Palmer returned to Stoke, but was the first new signing at Grimsby Town for the new 2005–06 season.

Despite being the first signing of the season, and initially presented as a first team player, Palmer found his path to winning a place in the team permanently blocked, and he found himself playing second fiddle to the likes of fellow forwards Michael Reddy, Gary Jones and Martin Gritton. Grimsby even opted to loan in another striker, Calvin Andrew from Luton Town as attacking cover. With this in mind, almost straight into the new season Palmer was placed up for loan, and subsequently joined Scarborough for an initial one-month period to gain experience and maintain fitness. Following the conclusion of his month with The Seadogs, Palmer returned to Grimsby only to be loaned straight back out to York City and then later in the season he spent a month with Alfreton Town

His only senior appearance for Grimsby came in the Football League Trophy clash with Morecambe in which Palmer replaced Simon Francis in the 87th minute of play. The game went on to extra time, with Morecambe winning on a penalty shootout. This would be the only time Jermaine would appear on the Grimsby team sheet and after seeing the rest of the season out in the reserves he was released from his contract at the end of the 2005–06 season. Since leaving the club, Palmer went on to move into the English non-league game, featuring for Worksop Town, Grantham Town, Hinckley United and Halesowen Town initially before joining Corby Town in December 2008. In March 2009 he moved to cash strapped Weymouth, where he played out the remaining Conference season with the club. In April 2009 due to the club being relegated to the Conference South he left the club. He eventually signed for Boston Town at the start of the 2009–10 season.

== Personal life ==
Since leaving professional football in 2006, Palmer has held down many jobs, most notably a postman for Royal Mail, a delivery driver, youth worker and for companies Alstom and Bombardier. He also spent a spell as a youth team coach at Derby County.

== Career statistics ==
| Club | Season | League | | | FA Cup | | League Cup | | Other^{[A]} | | Total | |
| Club | Season | Division | Apps | Goals | Apps | Goals | Apps | Goals | Apps | Goals | Apps | Goals |
|---|---|---|---|---|---|---|---|---|---|---|---|---|
| Stoke City | 2003–04 | First Division | 3 | 0 | 0 | 0 | 0 | 0 | 0 | 0 | 3 | 0 |
| Stoke City | 2004–05 | Championship | 1 | 0 | 0 | 0 | 0 | 0 | 0 | 0 | 1 | 0 |
| Grimsby Town | 2005–06 | League Two | 0 | 0 | 0 | 0 | 0 | 0 | 1 | 0 | 1 | 0 |
| Career Total | | | 4 | 0 | 0 | 0 | 0 | 0 | 1 | 0 | 5 | 0 |

A. The "Other" column constitutes appearances and goals in the Football League Trophy.
