= Gary Croft =

English footballer and commentator

Personal information
- Date of birth: 17 February 1974 (age 52)
- Place of birth: Burton upon Trent, England
- Height: 5 ft 9 in (1.75 m)
- Position: Left back

Youth career
- 1989–1992: Grimsby Town

Senior career*
Years	Team	Apps	(Gls)
1992–1996	Grimsby Town	172	(4)
1996–1999	Blackburn Rovers	52	(1)
1999–2002	Ipswich Town	37	(1)
2002	→ Wigan Athletic (loan)	7	(0)
2002	→ Cardiff City (loan)	8	(1)
2002–2005	Cardiff City	80	(2)
2005–2007	Grimsby Town	61	(0)
2007–2008	Lincoln City	20	(0)
2015	Grimsby Borough	6	(0)
Total		431	(9)

International career
1995	England U21	4	(0)
- * Club domestic league appearances and goals

Gary Croft (born 17 February 1974) is an English former professional footballer and co-commentator for BBC Radio Humberside.

As a player he was a left back from 1992 until 2008, as well as briefly coming out of retirement in 2015. He notably played for Grimsby Town, Blackburn Rovers and Ipswich Town, having also had spells with Wigan Athletic, Cardiff City, Lincoln City and Grimsby Borough. He was the first footballer to play in the Football League whilst wearing an electronic tag, when playing for Ipswich Town. Croft made his England under-21s debut against Brazil under-21s on 6 June 1995. David Beckham also made his debut in the same match.

== Career ==
=== Grimsby Town ===
Gary Croft graduated from the Grimsby Town youth setup in 1992, and was handed his first team debut by Alan Buckley shortly afterwards. Croft started as a left-back, but also filled in as a makeshift right back in John McDermott's absence, as well as also being known to cover central midfield, left midfield, right midfield and even as a support striker. Croft became an integral part of the Blundell Park setup and was one of a number of successful professional footballers in the mid nineties who came from the club, others included the likes of Jack Lester, Danny Butterfield and John Oster. His performances in the second tier of English football had attracted interest for a number of Premier League teams. His versatility and composure on the ball led to interest from Blackburn Rovers in 1996 who had won the Premier League title in the previous season.

=== Blackburn Rovers ===
Croft transferred to Blackburn for £1.6 million in 1996, brought to the club by Ray Harford, but although not usually a regular for the Rovers he would feature more under Roy Hodgson. Croft made over 50 appearances for the club and played Premier League football for them until he made a move to Ipswich Town in 1999. He scored his only goal for the club in a 1–0 win over Chelsea in November 1997.

=== Ipswich Town ===
Croft moved to Ipswich Town in 1999 and scored on his debut against Manchester City. Croft helped Ipswich return to the Premiership in 2000, and was a first team regular in the side managed by George Burley. It was while at Ipswich that Croft became the first footballer to play whilst wearing an electronic tag. Injury problems hampered the second half of Croft's time at Ipswich and after a loan spell with Wigan Athletic he was released.

=== Cardiff City ===
Following his release from Portman Road, Croft moved to Wales and signed for Cardiff City. However, following more injury woe, Croft was sidelined for the majority of his stay at Ninian Park and, following his team's rise up the league table, he was deemed surplus to requirements and was released at the end of the 2004/2005 season.

=== Return to Grimsby Town ===
In July 2005, Croft made a return to his first club Grimsby Town joining first on trial, and then two weeks later signing on a permanent basis. He struggled to break into the Grimsby side in his preferred position of left back due to the good performances of Tom Newey, but, due to an injury to veteran John McDermott, Croft played the majority of his first season at right back under Russell Slade. After two seasons at Grimsby, Croft was released by new manager Alan Buckley acrimony between the two, with the local press running an interview with Croft, but Buckley denying there had been any problems.

=== Lincoln City ===
In a surprise move Croft's next port of call, was Lincoln City following a trial with Burton Albion. Croft was released after twelve months at Sincil Bank after suffering further injuries and receiving several red cards.

=== Grimsby Borough ===
In 2015 Croft came out of retirement and joined Grimsby Borough as an attacking player.

== Personal life ==
In June 2008 he was reported to be in discussions with Hucknall Town, with a move to the US to play in the National Soccer League also mooted. Neither options came to fruition and Croft retired from the game. He went on to obtain his UEFA coaches badges, has also joined the Compass FM commentary team as expert summariser for Grimsby Town's matches, and continues to be involved with a local Grimsby/Cleethorpes area Estate Agent that he and relatives founded around the time of his second Mariners spell.

Croft now works for BBC Radio Humberside as a co-commentator on their coverage of Grimsby games.

== Honours ==
Ipswich Town

- Football League First Division play-offs: 2000

Cardiff City

- Football League Second Division play-offs: 2003

Individual

- Grimsby Town Supporters' Young Player of the Year: 1992–93, 1993–94, 1994–95
- Grimsby Town Supporters' Player of the Year: 1994–95
