= Rob Jones (footballer, born 1979) =

English footballer and manager

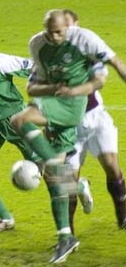
- Jones scoring a goal for Hibernian in 2006

Personal information
- Full name: Robert William Jones
- Date of birth: 3 November 1979 (age 46)
- Place of birth: Stockton-on-Tees, England
- Height: 6 ft 7 in (2.01 m)
- Position: Defender

Youth career
- York City

Senior career*
Years	Team	Apps	(Gls)
–1999	Whitby Town		
1999–2000	Northallerton Town		
2000–2001	Spennymoor United		
2001–2003	Gateshead	71	(12)
2003–2004	Stockport County	16	(2)
2003	→ Macclesfield Town (loan)	1	(0)
2004–2006	Grimsby Town	60	(5)
2006–2009	Hibernian	96	(8)
2009–2011	Scunthorpe United	42	(2)
2011	→ Sheffield Wednesday (loan)	8	(1)
2011–2012	Sheffield Wednesday	33	(4)
2012–2016	Doncaster Rovers	68	(10)
2016–2017	Hartlepool United	11	(0)
Total		406	(44)

Managerial career
- 2015: Doncaster Rovers (caretaker)
- * Club domestic league appearances and goals

Robert William Jones (born 3 November 1979) is an English football coach and former professional footballer.

Jones played as a defender having started his career with York City, before playing as a semi-professional for Whitby Town, Northallerton Town, Spennymoor United and Gateshead, he soon moved into the Football League in 2003 with Stockport County. After a brief loan spell with Macclesfield Town, Jones joined Grimsby Town, where his performances in the 2005–06 season earned him a move to Scottish Premier League club Hibernian.

Jones captained Hibs as the club won the 2007 Scottish League Cup final, in which he scored the opening goal. He moved to Scunthorpe United in 2009 for a club record fee, before signing for Sheffield Wednesday in 2011. Jones won promotion with Wednesday in 2011–12, but signed for Doncaster Rovers on 31 July 2012. He was appointed to a player/coach role with Doncaster in January 2013.

== Playing career ==
=== Early career ===
Born in Stockton-on-Tees, North East England, Jones began his career with York City's youth system as a schoolboy, where he played initially as a striker before being moved to play at left-back. After becoming disillusioned he gave up professional football and became a teacher, while playing non-League football with Northern Premier League side Whitby Town. He then went to Northallerton Town of the Northern League for the 1999–2000 season, before moving back to the Northern Premier League with Spennymoor United towards the end of the season. Jones then moved on to Gateshead at the beginning of the 2001–02 season. During his spell with the Tyneside club he made 87 appearances, scoring 19 goals from the centre of defence.

=== Stockport County ===
On 29 March 2003, Jones was signed by Stockport County for a fee of £5,000. Jones made his professional debut on 9 August 2003 in a 1–0 defeat against Wycombe Wanderers. Originally signed as cover, Jones struggled to break into the first team both under Carlton Palmer and his replacement Sammy McIlroy. By the end of the season Jones had only managed 16 appearances, scoring two goals against Luton Town and Peterborough United. During his spell with County he had a spell on loan with Macclesfield Town where he played one match, a 2–2 away draw against Hull City.

=== Grimsby Town ===
Jones signed on a free transfer for Russell Slade's Grimsby Town in July 2004 after impressing on trial. During the 2004–05 season, his first year at Blundell Park Jones struggled to cement his place in the first team, and was often overlooked in favour of Terrell Forbes and Justin Whittle. Jones made his debut on the opening day of the season in a 1–0 away defeat against Darlington. During the 2005–06 season Jones moved on to play a central role in the team in his second season. The club made a strong start to the season in both league and cup which included a 1–0 victory over Tottenham Hotspur in the League Cup second round during September 2005. It was following this match that Jones who impressed at centre half was carried off the pitch by Grimsby fans. The club failed to gain automatic promotion from League Two on the final day of the season and had to settle for the play-offs. Despite beating local rivals Lincoln City in the semi-final Grimsby lost the final 1–0 to Cheltenham Town. Following the club's failure to secure promotion Jones was one of several key players who departed the club in the summer of 2006 with the club agreeing a deal to sell Jones to Scottish Premier League club Hibernian.

=== Hibernian ===
Jones signed for Hibernian on a four-year contract in June 2006. He was very well received by Hibs supporters, who created his own individual song to the tune of "Gold" by Spandau Ballet. Jones was made captain of Hibernian in January 2007, replacing Kevin Thomson.

Jones went on to captain Hibs to their first piece of silverware in 16 years by beating Kilmarnock 5–1 in the 2007 Scottish League Cup final. He opened the scoring in that match with a header from a corner kick. Due to his height, Jones is effective in the air both defensively and at attacking set pieces. As of January 2009, Jones has scored ten goals in Scottish Premier League matches.

BBC Sport reported in the summer of 2007 that Jones had been angered by Hibs turning down an offer for him from Leeds United. Ipswich Town were also interested in Jones at the same time. Colchester United made a "six figure offer" for Jones during January 2009, but this was rejected by Hibs. Hibs also stated their intention to report Colchester to the Football League and the Football Association because Colchester publicised their offer, even though the offer document stated that it was "confidential". Hibs later rejected a second offer from Colchester for Jones.

=== Scunthorpe United ===
The 2009 close season saw Jones linked with several Championship clubs including Derby, Nottingham Forest, Bristol City and Swansea. He eventually signed for Scunthorpe United for an undisclosed "club record" fee.

=== Sheffield Wednesday ===
On 17 March 2011, Jones signed an emergency loan deal with Sheffield Wednesday until the end of the 2010–11 season. At the end of the season, Wednesday signed Jones on a two-year contract. Gary Megson then appointed Jones team captain for the 2011–12 season.

=== Doncaster Rovers ===
On 31 July 2012, Jones continued his tour of South Yorkshire, leaving recently promoted side Sheffield Wednesday to join League One club Doncaster Rovers, effectively replacing George Friend, who had just signed for Middlesbrough. Jones scored his first goal for Doncaster in a League Cup win over Hull City on 28 August 2012. Following the departure of manager Dean Saunders, Jones and former Wales manager Brian Flynn were put in temporary charge of the squad. After Flynn was appointed manager on a permanent basis, Jones was given a player/coach role to assist Flynn.

On the final day of the 2012–13 season Rovers faced title rivals Brentford away from home and in the final minute conceded a penalty which would have seen Doncaster fall to 3rd and seen the club have to make do with a play-off spot, however Marcello Trotta hit the crossbar and in the resulting scramble Doncaster went on the break to score in the final seconds with James Coppinger's goal not only rescuing them from the play-offs but handing them the League One title after leaders AFC Bournemouth could only manage a draw away at Tranmere Rovers. At the end of the season Flynn stood aside and was promoted to Director of Football, where he was replaced by Paul Dickov. Dickov in turn appointed his own coaching staff and named former Manchester City manager Brian Horton as his assistant resulting in Jones relinquishing his coaching duties and returning to be a full-time member of the playing squad. Jones took over as caretaker manager when Dickov was dismissed on 8 September 2015, and remained in charge until Darren Ferguson took over as manager on 18 October. Jones left Doncaster by mutual consent on 1 February 2016.

=== Hartlepool United ===
On 3 March 2016, Jones signed for League Two club Hartlepool United on a contract until the end of 2015–16.

== Coaching career ==
Jones is now a coach at the Leeds based soccer academy RIASA, which brings over players from USA for academic studying and football coaching.

== Career statistics ==
Appearances and goals by club, season and competition
Club	Season	League			National Cup		League Cup		Other		Total	
Club	Season	Division	Apps	Goals	Apps	Goals	Apps	Goals	Apps	Goals	Apps	Goals
Gateshead	2001–02	NPL Premier Division	36	5	1	0	—		7 (Note: Three appearances and one goal in Northern Premier League Challenge Cup, two appearances and one goal in FA Trophy, two appearances in Durham County Challenge Cup)	2	44	7
Gateshead	2002–03	NPL Premier Division	35	7	0	0	—		8 (Note: Two appearances and one goal in Durham County Challenge Cup, five appearances and four goals in Northern Premier League Challenge Cup, one appearance in FA Trophy)	5	43	12
Gateshead	Total		71	12	1	0	—		15	7	87	19
Stockport County	2003–04	Second Division	16	2	0	0	2	0	1 (Note: Appearance in Football League Trophy)	0	19	2
Macclesfield Town (loan)	2003–04	Third Division	1	0	—		—		—		1	0
Grimsby Town	2004–05	League Two	20	1	1	0	0	0	1	0	22	1
Grimsby Town	2005–06	League Two	40	4	1	0	3	0	2 (Note: Appearances in League Two play-offs)	0	46	4
Grimsby Town	Total		60	5	2	0	3	0	3	0	68	5
Hibernian	2006–07	Scottish Premier League	34	4	6	1	5	3	4 (Note: Appearance in UEFA Intertoto Cup)	0	49	8
Hibernian	2007–08	Scottish Premier League	30	0	3	0	1	0	0	0	34	0
Hibernian	2008–09	Scottish Premier League	32	4	1	0	0	0	2	0	35	4
Hibernian	Total		96	8	10	1	6	3	6	0	118	12
Scunthorpe United	2009–10	Championship	28	1	2	0	2	0	—		32	1
Scunthorpe United	2010–11	Championship	14	1	1	0	1	0	—		16	1
Scunthorpe United	Total		42	2	3	0	3	0	—		48	2
Sheffield Wednesday (loan)	2010–11	League One	8	1	—		—		—		8	1
Sheffield Wednesday	2011–12	League One	33	4	4	0	0	0	0	0	37	4
Sheffield Wednesday	Total		41	5	4	0	0	0	0	0	45	5
Doncaster Rovers	2012–13	League One	44	7	2	0	2	1	1	0	49	8
Doncaster Rovers	2013–14	Championship	12	1	0	0	2	0	—		14	1
Doncaster Rovers	2014–15	League One	10	2	0	0	1	0	—		11	2
Doncaster Rovers	2015–16	League One	2	0	0	0	2	0	—		4	0
Doncaster Rovers	Total		68	10	2	0	7	1	1	0	78	11
Hartlepool United	2015–16	League Two	7	0	—		—		—		7	0
Hartlepool United	2016–17	League Two	3	0	0	0	0	0	0	0	3	0
Hartlepool United	Total		10	0	0	0	0	0	0	0	10	0
Career total			405	44	22	1	21	4	26	7	474	56

== Managerial statistics ==
As of 18 October 2015

Managerial record by team and tenure
Team	From	To	Record					Ref
Team	From	To	P	W	D	L	Win %	Ref
Doncaster Rovers (caretaker)	8 September 2015	18 October 2015	7	1	2	4	14.3	
Total			7	1	2	4	14.3	—

== Honours ==
Hibernian

- Scottish League Cup: 2006–07

Sheffield Wednesday

- Football League One runner-up: 2011–12

Doncaster Rovers

- Football League One: 2012–13

Individual

- PFA Team of the Year: 2012–13 League One
- Grimsby Town Player of the Year: 2005–06
- Doncaster Rovers Player of the Year: 2012–13
