= Gary Cohen (footballer) =

English former professional footballer

Personal information
- Full name: Gary Dane Cohen
- Place of birth: London, England
- Height: 5 ft 10 in (1.78 m)
- Positions: Forward; winger

Team information
- Current team: bishops Stortford
- Number: 15

Youth career
- Watford

Senior career*
Years	Team	Apps	(Gls)
2002–2003	Watford	0	(0)
2003	Scarborough	7	(2)
2003–2006	Gretna	25	(0)
2004–2005	→ Workington (loan)	46	(18)
2005–2006	→ Grimsby Town (loan)	26	(6)
2006–2007	Grimsby Town	14	(0)
2008–2010	St Albans City	81	(12)
2015–2017	Royston Town	18	(1)
2017	AFC Hornchurch	20	(1)
2017–2018	Soham Town Rangers	39	(3)
Total		276	(43)
- * Club domestic league appearances and goals

Gary Dane Cohen (born 20 January 1984) is an English former professional footballer who played as a forward and winger.

His professional career initially lasted from 2002 until 2007. He played for Grimsby Town where he was a runner-up in the League Two play-off final. Prior to this he had come through the youth academy at Watford and played for both Scarborough before a stint in the Scottish Football League with Gretna. He retired in 2007 following a knee injury he sustained at Grimsby but has since come out of retirement on two occasions and has played at Non-League level for St Albans City, Royston Town, AFC Hornchurch and Soham Town Rangers. He also had a brief stint as a competitive road racing cyclist in between his two playing spells.

== Football career ==
=== Early career ===
Cohen started his career as a trainee at Watford and was added to the club's first team squad during the 2002–03 season but failed to play a first team match and was eventually released by The Hornets at end of the season. He then teamed up Russell Slade at Scarborough where he scored twice in seven appearances with the club from the McCain Stadium. His next port of call was to sign for Gretna, who at the time had earned back to back promotions that took them from the foot of the Scottish Football League up into the Scottish Premier League. Cohen, however struggled to make an impact on the first team and was loaned to Northern Premier League side Workington in the 2004–05 season where he found the net twenty times and finished as the club's top scorer, helping them to gain promotion to the Conference North.

=== Grimsby Town ===
In June 2005 he became one of the first new signings of the 2005–06 season for Grimsby Town joining Terry Barwick, Jermaine Palmer and John Lukic as the first new additions. He linked up with Russell Slade once more who signed Cohen on a season long loan deal from his Scottish parent club. Primarily used as a forward at his previous clubs, Cohen became a makeshift right and left sided midfielder and his performances soon earned him a permanent deal when he was signed for an undisclosed fee in February 2006. Cohen was part of the Grimsby side that defeated Tottenham Hotspur in the second round of the League Cup and the eventual defeat against Newcastle United in the following round. He was also part of the side that lost the League Two Play-off final against Cheltenham Town which condemned Grimsby to a third successive season in the fourth tier of English football.

=== St Albans City ===
Cohen would go on to miss the entire 2006–07 season due to an injury picked up in pre-season, and at the end of the year he was released by Alan Buckley, however The Football Association gave Grimsby the registration forms for Cohen and the first option to sign him back up if the situation ever came about, however Cohen opted to retire from professional football due to his on-going injury woes having spent the entire 2007–08 season without a club and still suffering from injury. In 2008, he came out of retirement and signed for Conference South side St Albans City in August 2008. Cohen played for the club for two seasons, scoring 12 goals in 81 appearances. He eventually retired in May 2010 to work in the Ambulance service.

=== Return ===
In 2015, Cohen came out of a five-year retirement from competitive football and signed a contract for Royston Town. In 2017 he briefly joined AFC Hornchurch before moving to Soham Town Rangers. He departed Soham in May 2018.

== Cycling career ==
In 2013 Cohen announced he was attempting a career in cycling and hoped that he would be able to become an Olympic road racer. He began cycling for Glendene CC from Brentwood, Essex. He began writing a blog on his progress, and made his debut in the Ford CC Dunton Summer Series Round 7 race in which he finished in 47th place.

== Personal life ==
His dad ran for Great Britain and went to two Olympic Games; Gary's mother ran 100m also representing Great Britain. His maternal Auntie ran 100m for Great Britain at the Olympic Games.

Cohen has also worked for the Ambulance service following his retirement from professional football.

He now has 3 sons.

== Honours ==
Individual

- Grimsby Town Supporters' Young Player of the Year: 2006
