= Michael Reddy =

Irish former professional footballer

Personal information
- Full name: Michael Reddy
- Date of birth: 24 March 1980 (age 46)
- Place of birth: Kilkenny, Ireland
- Position: Striker

Youth career
- Kilkenny City

Senior career*
Years	Team	Apps	(Gls)
1997–1999	Kilkenny City		
1999–2004	Sunderland	10	(1)
2001	→ Swindon Town (loan)	18	(7)
2001	→ Hull City (loan)	5	(4)
2002	→ Barnsley (loan)	0	(0)
2002–2003	→ York City (loan)	11	(4)
2003	→ Sheffield Wednesday (loan)	15	(3)
2003–2004	→ Sheffield Wednesday (loan)	12	(3)
2004–2007	Grimsby Town	70	(26)
Total		141	(46)

International career
1999–2000	Republic of Ireland U21	8	(3)
- * Club domestic league appearances and goals

Michael Reddy (born 24 March 1980 in Kilkenny) is an Irish former professional footballer who played as a forward from 1997 to 2007.

He notably played for Sunderland and Grimsby Town. He also appeared as a professional for Kilkenny City, Swindon Town, Hull City, Barnsley, York City and Sheffield Wednesday. Reddy retired from professional football in 2007 after failing to regain his fitness following three operations from a hip injury he endured while playing with Grimsby Town in 2006. He was capped eight times by the Republic of Ireland Under-21 side, scoring three goals.

== Career ==
=== Kilkenny City ===
He made his League of Ireland debut for his local senior side at Buckley Park on 15 March 1998, against Dundalk, at the age of 17, scoring two goals and giving Kilkenny City a 2–1 win.

=== Sunderland ===
Reddy, as a striker, signed for Sunderland from Kilkenny City in 1999. He spent five years on Wearside; between 2001 and his departure in 2004, he was loaned out to Swindon, Hull, Barnsley, York, and twice to Sheffield Wednesday. He made 18 appearances for Sunderland, scoring twice, and he scored a late equalizer against Middlesbrough in the league. His other Sunderland goal came in the League Cup against Luton Town. Manager Peter Reid declared Reddy to be the "most exciting young player" he had ever worked with. According to Swindon boss Andy King, Reddy had been valued at £5 million in 2001. He received the club's Young Player of the Year award and was called into the full Irish squad in the same season. Michael's career at Sunderland ended after he ruptured his medial ligament in a training ground accident.

=== Grimsby Town ===
In July 2004, Reddy signed for Grimsby Town as one of the first new signings under newly installed manager Russell Slade. He was a huge signing for the cash-strapped and relegation-hit club, as was the addition of winger Andy Parkinson, who had joined the club a few days previously. During Reddy's first season, he was still recovering from a medial ligament injury. Reddy was used as Town's striker, mainly playing alongside Martin Gritton, Matt Harrold or Colin Cramb throughout this season. He finished the season by scoring a hat-trick against the Kidderminster Harriers. He managed nine goals throughout the season, and the club finished in 18th place.

The 2005–06 campaign saw him remain with Grimsby and partner up with new signing Gary Jones. Reddy and Jones managed to find the net 31 times throughout the season. During the season, the club defeated both Derby County and Tottenham Hotspur in the League Cup, before losing to Newcastle United. Michael was involved in all three games. Reddy was named in the PFA Team of the Year for that season.

Reddy's season was interrupted by a hip injury in March, and as a result, he did not complete another ninety minutes for the remainder of the campaign. The Mariners fell out of the automatic promotion ranks on the penultimate day of the season. Reddy was deemed fit enough to take part in the play-off campaign. Gary Jones and Ben Futcher's goals defeated Lincoln City in the semi-final stages. Slade opted to play Reddy from the start in the final at the Millennium Stadium against Cheltenham Town, but he was substituted due to receiving a concussion after a clash of heads. Grimsby attempted to use Junior Mendes and Gary Cohen to help cater for Jones in attack, and the club lost the game 1–0.

After failing to secure a promotion, his manager, Russell Slade, resigned, and Reddy requested to be put on the transfer list. This was followed by several press reports linking him with a move to the newly promoted Premiership side Sheffield United. It was Leeds United and Bristol City who made more of a forward approach for the player. Grimsby had also made the signing of striker Isaiah Rankin in the hope of combining the pair in an attempt to make a second assault on promotion from League Two, but Michael still had a persistent hip injury. Reddy managed to play the odd game, and soon Slade's replacement as manager, Graham Rodger, was dismissed by the club after a 'poor' start to the season. In turn, the club appointed Alan Buckley as his successor. The new Grimsby boss stated that he wanted to keep Reddy, who had by now undergone hip surgery. With Reddy interested in leaving Blundell Park, he subsequently ignored contract talks in favor of potential offers from Bristol City. Leyton Orient had made an unsuccessful approach to Reddy's services.

== Personal life ==
Former Grimsby manager Russell Slade, who was the manager of Yeovil Town, offered to help Reddy with his rehabilitation after he had a second hip operation. Reddy remained with Yeovil for several weeks before leaving the club. After an unsuccessful third hip operation, Michael retired from professional football. He has since taken up his UEFA B coaching license with the English FA in 2009.

As of 2012, Reddy is studying business at Manchester Metropolitan University.

== Honours ==
Individual

- PFA Team of the Year: 2005–06 Football League Two
