= Paul Bolland =

English footballer

Personal information
- Full name: Paul Graham Arthur Bolland
- Date of birth: 23 December 1979 (age 46)
- Place of birth: Bradford, England
- Height: 5 ft 11 in (1.80 m)
- Position: Midfielder

Youth career
- 1994–1997: Bradford City

Senior career*
Years	Team	Apps	(Gls)
1997–1999	Bradford City	12	(0)
1999	→ Notts County (loan)	10	(0)
1999–2005	Notts County	161	(6)
2005–2009	Grimsby Town	118	(13)
2009–2011	Macclesfield Town	53	(3)
2011–2013	Mansfield Town	10	(0)
2012	→ Harrogate Town (loan)	19	(2)
2012–2013	→ Harrogate Town (loan)	36	(1)
Total		419	(25)

Managerial career
- 2013–2015: Harrogate Town (U19)
- * Club domestic league appearances and goals

Paul Graham Arthur Bolland (born 23 December 1979) is an English former professional footballer, commentator and football coach who is head of football at Queen Ethelburga's Collegiate.

As a player, he was a midfielder from 1997 to 2013 and represented Bradford City, Notts County, Grimsby Town, Macclesfield Town, Mansfield Town and Harrogate Town.

== Career ==
=== Bradford City ===
Born in Bradford, West Yorkshire, Bolland started his career with his home town team of Bradford City at the start of the 1997–98 season after progressing through the club's youth setup. His first manager was Chris Kamara, before playing under Paul Jewell. He found his time at Valley Parade a hard one, and found it difficult to break into the first team setup, and he eventually left the club in April 1999 after the club had secured promotion to the Premier League for the first time in their history.

=== Notts County ===
After struggling to break into the first team at Bradford, Bolland signed for Notts County, initially on loan, and then permanently for £75,000. Bolland was unexpectedly not given a contract extension by Notts County at the end of the 2004–05 season, prompting him to join Grimsby Town.

=== Grimsby Town ===
Bolland became one of the first new signings for Russell Slade at Grimsby Town for the 2005–06 season. He slotted into his familiar central midfield role, alongside fellow new signings Jean-Paul Kamudimba Kalala and Ciaran Toner. Bolland was part of the Town side that defeated Tottenham Hotspur in the League Cup that same season, and The Mariners went on to finally lose out in the League Two Play Off Final. Paul kept his regular role in the 2006–07 season, briefly captaining the side on several occasions under short lived manager Graham Rodger and his replacement Alan Buckley. On 15 September 2007, he made his 100th appearance for Grimsby, and later on in the same season, he scored one of his most notable goals which came in the Football League Trophy semi-final first leg against Morecambe in a 1–0 win at Christie Park. In the second leg at Blundell Park, Grimsby defended for their lives as they earned a 0–0 draw. After the final whistle Bolland was mobbed by fans as he had played a major part in enabling the Mariners to play at Wembley Stadium for the third time in their history. In the final, Grimsby Town played Milton Keynes Dons, at Wembley Stadium, where they lost 2–0. Bolland spent the entire 2008–09 season out injured, after picking up an injury in the latter stages of the previous season. Bolland was released by Grimsby in the summer of 2009, with new manager Mike Newell admitting he wanted to give Bolland a chance to prove himself in pre-season, but Bolland decided to leave the club, settling up his contract with one month remaining. On 18 June Bolland was linked with Chester City

=== Macclesfield Town ===
Bolland signed for Macclesfield Town on 29 June 2009. He was released by the club, along with 10 other players at the end of the 2009–10 season. He went on trial with Conference National team York City in July, although he was later re-signed by Macclesfield on a one-year contract on 19 July. Bolland was voted as Player of The Year by his fellow Macclesfield Town Players and given a trophy 'Players Player of the Year' for 2010–11 season.

=== Mansfield Town ===
Paul signed for Conference National club Mansfield on 1 June 2011 on a two-year contract, after rejecting a new contract at Macclesfield. After struggling to hold down a place in the first team, he joined Harrogate Town on loan. Bolland made 19 appearances for Harrogate, scoring twice and helping the club stave off relegation from the Conference North. He returned to Mansfield at the end of April with his parent club contesting the Conference National play-offs.

Bolland re-signed for Harrogate on a season long loan on 17 August 2012. He played 36 times for the club, scoring 1 goal. Bolland was released by the club in May 2013.

== Coaching career ==
Bolland returned to Harrogate in the summer of 2013 and also took a role as the club's U19 Head Coach, in July 2013 Bolland began training with Bradford Park Avenue and playing in the club's pre-season matches. In 2015, he became Head of Football at Queen Ethelburga's Collegiate.

== Honours ==
Grimsby Town

- Football League Trophy runner-up: 2007–08

== Personal life ==
He graduated in 2022 from Staffordshire University with a First class degree in Professional Sports Writing and Broadcasting.
