= Jean-Paul Kalala =

Democratic Republic of the Congo footballer (born 1982)

Personal information
- Full name: Jean-Paul Kamudimba Kalala
- Date of birth: 16 February 1982 (age 44)
- Place of birth: Lubumbashi, Zaire
- Height: 6 ft 0 in (1.83 m)
- Position: Midfielder

Youth career
- Nice

Senior career*
Years	Team	Apps	(Gls)
1999–2003	Nice B	118	(3)
2003–2005	Nice	2	(0)
2005–2006	Grimsby Town	21	(5)
2006–2007	Yeovil Town	38	(1)
2007–2009	Oldham Athletic	20	(0)
2008–2009	→ Grimsby Town (loan)	21	(2)
2009–2011	Yeovil Town	49	(1)
2011	Bristol Rovers	11	(0)
2011–2012	Southend United	24	(1)
Total		304	(13)

International career
2002–2006	DR Congo	7	(0)
- * Club domestic league appearances and goals

Jean-Paul Kamudimba Kalala (born 16 February 1982), also known as JP Kalala, is a Congolese former professional footballer who played as a midfielder from 1999 to 2012.

He started his career in France playing for Nice before moving to Grimsby Town in 2005. Whilst with Grimsby he is notably remembered for scoring the winning goal in injury time in a League Cup tie against Tottenham Hotspur. He later went on to play for Yeovil Town and Oldham Athletic before moving back to Grimsby on loan in 2008. He re-joined Yeovil for a second spell in 2009 and went on to play for Bristol Rovers and Southend United. He earned seven caps for the DR Congo national team.

== Club career ==
=== Nice ===
Kalala started his career with the French club OGC Nice in 1999, but it took him until 2003 to gain a promotion to the club's first team. After only two league appearances he was released at the end of the 2004–05 season after spending six years at the club playing for both the first team and the B side.

=== Grimsby Town ===
Kalala joined Swansea City on trial and played in several pre-season games, but wasn't offered a deal by Kenny Jackett who admitted the midfielder wasn't the type of player he was looking for. He then moved to England and joined Grimsby Town in June 2005 initially on a trial along with several other French league players Makhtar N'Diaye and Madjid Ben Haddou. His first appearance for Grimsby, was in a 1–1 draw against Rotherham United in pre-season in which Kalala hit the post from 25 yards. On 1 July 2005, he made his move to Grimsby a permanent one. Kalala was a regular in the first team, sitting in a central midfield role with Paul Bolland. Kalala's early season performances helped Town to become early pace setters in League Two.

He famously scored a goal that sent Premier League side Tottenham Hotspur out of the League Cup. The goal came in the 87th minute of play when Andy Parkinson's inswinging corner connected with Kalala who volleyed home from the edge of the area. The goal saw Grimsby win the game 1–0 and set up a tie with Newcastle United in the third round. Kalala went on to pick up five goals in the league for The Mariners, another noted strike was a 35-yard driver in a 4–0 home win over Notts County.

Kalala eventually lost his place in the starting eleven to Ciaran Toner, after he went to the African Nations Cup to represent the DR Congo national team. However, Kalala did not even manage to get on the pitch during the competition. On his return to Blundell Park, he found it tough going to dislodge Toner from the first team. Mariners boss Russell Slade had also signed Curtis Woodhouse, another centralised midfielder who played in the same natural position to Kalala. Grimsby failed to gain automatic promotion, and thus settled for a place in the play-offs. They eventually were knocked out by Cheltenham Town in the final, losing 1–0 at the Millennium Stadium in Cardiff. Kalala was only an unused substitute in the game.

=== Yeovil Town ===
Following Grimsby's failure to secure promotion, Kalala opted to leave the club. He moved up a league and joined Yeovil Town soon after on a free transfer, where he followed Grimsby manager Russell Slade and goalkeeper Steve Mildenhall to Huish Park. After one season with the Somerset club, where he was part of the side that reached the playoff final, but like the previous season with Grimsby, he was on the losing side. Following the conclusion of the 2006–07 season, he was released by Russell Slade, the man who initially brought him to England.

=== Oldham Athletic ===
Following his release from Yeovil, Kalala moved again on a free to League One side Oldham Athletic, signing a two-year contract for the club on 28 June 2007. He made his first team debut for the Latics on 11 August in a 2–1 victory over Swansea City. Three days later, he would score his first goal for the club in a 4–1 victory over Mansfield Town in the League Cup. On 19 January 2008, Kalala returned to Huish Park in a League One clash versus Yeovil Town, his first trip back to his former club. The game ended in a 0–0 draw.

On 13 May, after returning from his Grimsby Town loan, Kalala was released by Oldham, after the club decided not to renew his contract.

==== Grimsby Town (loan) ====
On 30 October 2008 it was announced that Kalala would return to Grimsby, He joined his former side, struggling in League Two, and at and opposite end of the table to when he left them. He joined the club on an initial loan deal until 3 January and was Mike Newell's first signing as the new manager of the club. In his first game back he scored Grimsby's only goal in a 2–1 defeat against Darlington. It was announced in late December, Newell's desire to sign Kalala on a permanent basis along with fellow loanees Adam Proudlock and Rob Atkinson. On 9 January 2009, Kalala began to hold talks over a permanent switch back to the club. Newell had hoped the further acquisitions of fellow French speaking players Jean-Louis Akpa Akpro and Mickael Buscher would sway his decision to re-join the club permanently. However, due to the club's current low league position, Kalala snubbed a permanent contract, but did however extend his loan stay with the North East Lincolnshire club until the end of the season. Little under two months later, Kalala got injured, forcing him to spend the last two months of the season on the sidelines. He played 21 times in his loan spell, scoring twice. His final game for the club was on 11 March 2009, in a 2–1 defeat against Chesterfield.

=== Return to Yeovil Town and move to Bristol Rovers ===
Yeovil Town resigned Kalala in August 2009. Kalala joined fellow League One side Bristol Rovers on 31 January 2011. He was one of seventeen players released by the team in May 2011.

=== Southend United ===
On 27 July 2011, Kalala signed a one-year contract with Southend United with the option of a further year after impressing on trial. He scored his first and only goal for the club in a 4–1 loss to Swindon Town. Following the conclusion of the 2011–12 season, manager Paul Sturrock opted against extending his contract and he was subsequently released. Kalala returned to Southend in the summer to train with the club, but after picking up an injury he returned to France to help with his rehabilitation.

== International career ==
Kalala was part of the Congolese 2004 African Nations Cup team, who finished bottom of their group in the first round of competition, thus failing to secure qualification for the quarter-finals. In 2006 he was again part of the squad that reached the quarter-finals, but did not get on the pitch.

== Personal life ==
Kalala abruptly retired from football in 2012. He now resides in Nice, France where he works as a barber in a beauty salon he owns named "Estika". He acquired French nationality by naturalization on 23 February 2004.
