= Ciarán Toner =

Northern Irish professional footballer

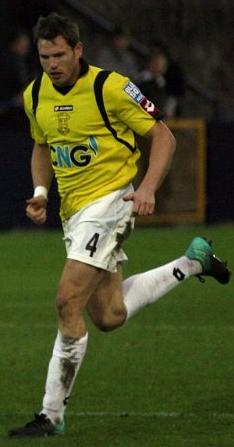
- Toner playing for Harrogate Town in 2010

Personal information
- Full name: Ciarán Toner
- Date of birth: 30 June 1981 (age 45)
- Place of birth: Craigavon, Northern Ireland
- Height: 6 ft 1 in (1.85 m)
- Position: Midfielder

Youth career
- 1998–2000: Tottenham Hotspur

Senior career*
Years	Team	Apps	(Gls)
2000–2002	Tottenham Hotspur	0	(0)
2001–2002	→ Peterborough United (loan)	6	(0)
2002	→ Bristol Rovers (loan)	6	(0)
2002–2004	Leyton Orient	52	(2)
2004–2005	Lincoln City	15	(2)
2005	→ Cambridge United (loan)	8	(0)
2005–2008	Grimsby Town	94	(14)
2008–2010	Rochdale	50	(1)
2010–2011	Harrogate Town	31	(2)
2011–2012	Guiseley	40	(5)
2013–2015	Gainsborough Trinity	60	(5)
Total		362	(31)

International career
2000–2003	Northern Ireland U21	17	(1)
2003	Northern Ireland	2	(0)

Managerial career
- 2023–2025: Doncaster Rovers Belles
- * Club domestic league appearances and goals

Ciarán Toner (born 30 June 1981) is a Northern Irish football coach and former professional footballer. He was most recently manager of Doncaster Rovers Belles.

As a player, he played as a midfielder from 2000 to 2015. He came through the youth academy at Premier League side Tottenham Hotspur and was promoted to the club's first team during the 2000–01 season, but after loans to both Peterborough United and Bristol Rovers he was eventually released in 2002 without playing a first-team game for the club. He then spent two years with Leyton Orient before joining Lincoln City for the 2004–05 season. He was loaned out to Cambridge United later that season but ended up suffering relegation to the Conference National with Cambridge while his parent club lost out on promotion in the League Two Play-off final. Following a trial he signed for Grimsby Town the following season and remained with The Mariners for three seasons and suffered a play-off final defeat in his first year whilst finishing joint top scorer in his second season. In the summer of 2008 he joined Rochdale and was part of the side that earned promotion to League One during the 2009–10 campaign. He left the club shortly afterwards to pursue other interests and moved into non-League football for the first time in his career by signing for Conference North sides Harrogate Town, and a year later Guiseley. He remained clubless for the entire 2012–13 season to pursue a career in coaching and later joined the coaching staff at Rotherham United before returning to playing at the age of 32 when he signed with Gainsborough Trinity in September 2013 combining, both, playing and coaching. He, quickly moved up the ranks at Rotherham United from under-15 to under-18 coach in the space of 5 years ending as the lead professional development phase coach.

He has also earned two caps in 2003 for Northern Ireland and earned 17 caps, scoring once, for the Northern Ireland U21 side.

In 2020, he left Rotherham United to pursue his business interests within the industry.

== Club career ==
=== Tottenham Hotspur ===
Toner was promoted to the first team setup at White Hart Lane at the beginning of the 2000–01 season. He failed to make an appearance for the club in his two seasons at the Premiership outfit, but spent time on loan with Peterborough United and Bristol Rovers, before being released at the end of the 2001–02 season.

=== Leyton Orient ===
His next port of call was to sign with Leyton Orient. He made his debut for the Brisbane Road club on the opening day of the 2002–03 season, with a 3–2 victory over Macclesfield Town. Toner went on to make just over 60 appearances for the club in his two-season stay. He scored twice, his first coming in a 1–1 away draw with Hull City on 31 August 2002. While with Orient, Toner impressed enough to be called up to the Northern Ireland international team, where he played in two games, against Spain and Italy.

=== Lincoln City ===
At the start of the 2004–05 season, Toner was signed by Lincoln City manager Keith Alexander on a one-year deal. He became a first team regular at Sincil Bank, scoring vital goals in victories over the club's rivals Grimsby Town and Mansfield Town. Toner made 17 appearances for The Imps, scoring twice, before being loaned out to Cambridge United later that season. Toner made eight appearances for United, and the club were eventually relegated from the Football League at the end of the season.

=== Grimsby Town ===
During July 2005, Toner joined up with Grimsby Town on an initial trial period he was one of many players on trial at the club that summer and was invited by the club to take part in their pre-season British Army boot camp. Shortly before the start of the season Town manager Russell Slade rewarded Toner with a one-year contract, to which he accepted. In his first season with Grimsby Toner initially found it hard to break up Slade's favoured central midfield role of Paul Bolland and Jean-Paul Kamudimba Kalala. It wasn't until Kalala joined up with the DR Congo international side for the African Nations Cup midway through the 2005–06 season that Toner began to find his feet in the first team. Toner, however, would eventually lose his place again when Slade signed Curtis Woodhouse in the January transfer window. Grimsby would go on to defeat former side Lincoln City in the Play-off semi-finals before finally losing out in the final at the Millennium Stadium to Cheltenham Town, Toner however was an unused substitute in the final. In his second season at Blundell Park, Toner finished joint top scorer with eight goals, as he played a large part in keeping Alan Buckley's side in the Football League. Toner was rewarded and signed a new two-year deal in the summer of 2007. On 26 June 2008 it was confirmed that Toner would leave the club after agreeing with the club to cancel his contract, despite having one year remaining on the deal. While at Grimsby, Toner managed to score some important goals, two of them goals came against his former side Lincoln City, in the clubs local derbys. One of them came in a 3–0 home win for The Mariners in 2005, while the other came in a 2–1 away win for Grimsby in 2007. He had previously scored in 2004 for Lincoln in the same fixture.

=== Rochdale ===
Immediately after his release from Grimsby, he signed a deal with fellow League Two side Rochdale. He did not feature in Rochdale's first game of the season, against former club Grimsby Town at Blundell Park and instead, Toner made his debut against Oldham Athletic in the League Cup and throughout the 2008–09 season he became a first team regular mainly featuring alongside veteran Gary Jones in the centre of midfield. Toner became an integral part of the Dale side by making 37 appearances and scoring a wonder strike against Aldershot Town. Rochdale went on to finish sixth in the league and claim a play-off spot, but lost out in the final.

Toner had a race to be fit for the opening day of the 2009–10 football season after having problems with his ear drum in Rochdale's pre-season training camp in Marbella before suffering from shin splints which made him miss the rest of Rochdale's pre season matches. Toner won his race by being named as an unused substitute for Rochdale's opening day fixture to Port Vale. Dale were promoted to League One at the end of the season after finishing third in the table despite leading the league for a lengthy period of the season.

=== Harrogate Town ===
In August 2010 he signed for Conference North outfit Harrogate Town. He made his debut on 28 August 2010 in a 6–3 defeat to Boston United. On 4 September 2010, he scored his first goal for the club in a 2–2 draw at home to Hinckley United.

=== Guiseley ===
In July 2011 he joined Guiseley reuniting him with former Grimsby teammates Danny Boshell and Jamie Clarke. After losing in the Conference North play-off semi-finals, he was released at the end of the 2011–12 season.

=== Gainsborough Trinity ===
On 13 September 2013, after spending time with Rotherham United as a coach during the 2012–13 season, Conference North side Gainsborough Trinity announced the signing of Toner on a non-contract basis.

== International career ==
In 2003, Toner was called up to play for Northern Ireland in two matches for his country, replacing Damien Johnson in a friendly against Italy, and Thomas Doherty in a 0–0 draw with Spain.

== Coaching career ==
During the 2012–13 season, Toner took a break from playing football and joined York City as Under 14 coach while studying for his UEFA A Licence qualification. The following season he joined League Two side Rotherham United's coaching staff. In the summer of 2013 he returned to the playing side of the game with Gainsborough Trinity. whilst continuing his coaching journey with Rotherham.

Toner held the role of Lead Professional Development Phase coach at Rotherham United until October 2020.

In November 2023, Toner was appointed manager of FA Women's National League Division One Midlands club Doncaster Rovers Belles. He was sacked by the club in April 2025.

== Career statistics ==
Appearances and goals by club, season and competition
Club	Season	League			FA Cup		League Cup		Other		Total	
Club	Season	Division	Apps	Goals	Apps	Goals	Apps	Goals	Apps	Goals	Apps	Goals
Tottenham Hotspur	2000–01	Premier League	0	0	0	0	0	0	0	0	0	0
Tottenham Hotspur	2001–02	Premier League	0	0	0	0	0	0	0	0	0	0
Tottenham Hotspur	Total		0	0	0	0	0	0	0	0	0	0
Peterborough United (loan)	2001–02	Second Division	6	0	1	0	0	0	0	0	7	0
Bristol Rovers (loan)	2001–02	Third Division	6	0	0	0	0	0	0	0	6	0
Leyton Orient	2002–03	Third Division	25	1	1	0	1	0	2 (Note: Appearance(s) in Football League Trophy)	0	29	1
Leyton Orient	2003–04	Third Division	27	1	0	0	1	0	0	0	28	1
Leyton Orient	Total		52	2	1	0	2	0	2	0	57	2
Lincoln City	2004–05	League Two	15	2	0	0	1	0	1	0	17	2
Cambridge United (loan)	2004–05	League Two	8	0	0	0	0	0	0	0	8	0
Grimsby Town	2005–06	League Two	31	3	0	0	0	0	3 (Note: 1 appearance(s) in Football League Trophy) (Note: 2 appearance(s) in League Two play-offs)	0	34	3
Grimsby Town	2006–07	League Two	33	8	1	0	1	0	2	0	37	8
Grimsby Town	2007–08	League Two	30	3	3	0	1	0	3	1	37	4
Grimsby Town	Total		94	14	4	0	2	0	8	1	108	15
Rochdale	2008–09	League Two	37	1	2	0	1	0	4 (Note: 2 appearance(s) in Football League Trophy)	0	44	1
Rochdale	2009–10	League Two	13	0	0	0	0	0	0	0	13	0
Rochdale	Total		50	1	2	0	1	0	4	0	57	1
Harrogate Town	2010–11	Conference North	31	2	0	0	0	0	1 (Note: Appearance(s) in FA Trophy)	0	32	2
Guiseley	2011–12	Conference North	40	5	0	0	0	0	5 (Note: 3 appearance(s) in FA Trophy) (Note: 2 appearance(s) in Conference North play-offs)	0	45	5
Gainsborough Trinity	2013–14	Conference North	29	2	0	0	0	0	0	0	29	2
Gainsborough Trinity	2014–15	Conference North	31	3	1	0	0	0	1	0	33	3
Gainsborough Trinity	Total		60	5	1	0	0	0	1	0	62	5
Career total			362	31	9	0	6	0	22	1	399	32

== Honours ==
Grimsby Town

- Football League Trophy runner-up: 2007–08

Rochdale

- Football League Two promotion: 2009–10

Individual

- Football League Two Goal of the season: 2008–09
