= Graham Rodger =

Scottish-born English footballer and manager

Personal information
- Date of birth: 1 April 1967 (age 59)
- Place of birth: Glasgow, Scotland
- Position: Defender

Youth career
- Wolverhampton Wanderers

Senior career*
Years	Team	Apps	(Gls)
1984–1985	Wolverhampton Wanderers	1	(0)
1985–1989	Coventry City	36	(2)
1989–1992	Luton Town	28	(2)
1992–1998	Grimsby Town	147	(11)
Total		212	(15)

International career
1987	England U21	4	(0)

Managerial career
- 2004: Grimsby Town (Caretaker)
- 2006: Grimsby Town
- * Club domestic league appearances and goals

Graham Rodger (born 1 April 1967) is an English football coach, former professional footballer and scout.

As a player, he was a defender from 1984 until 1998 for Wolverhampton Wanderers, Coventry City and Luton Town before finishing his career with a six-year stint at Grimsby Town, where he retired in 1998 following the club's promotion to Football League First Division. Since his retirement from the playing side of the game Rodger has remained with Grimsby, firstly holding the position of community coach and later assistant manager and caretaker manager. In 2006, he had a brief stint as the club's permanent manager but was dismissed after 5 months in charge. Shortly after his dismissal he was brought back to the club once again taking up his role in the community.

== Playing career ==
The highpoint of Rodger's playing days was his FA Cup win in 1987. Playing against the favourites Tottenham Hotspur, Coventry City secured a memorable extra-time victory. Rodger featured as a substitute for the injured captain Brian Kilcline late in normal time, and played an important part in the winning goal with a superb pass through several players to Lloyd McGrath which resulted in the goal seconds later.

Rodger transferred to Grimsby Town in 1992 and was an ever-present defender for the club for the next six seasons. He was a regular for the club up until his final season, in which he was a part of the historic 1997/1998 Promotion team. He was released by manager Alan Buckley in the summer of 1998, and after training with Hull City he retired from professional football.

== Management and coaching career ==
After retiring from playing in 1998, Rodger was appointed Sports in the Community Officer at Grimsby a year later in 1999. Rodger later moved onto the coaching staff at Blundell Park and following the dismissal of manager Lennie Lawrence and his assistant John Cockerill in 2001, the new Town boss Paul Groves appointed Rodger as his new Assistant Manager. Rodger was then given the managerial position on a caretaker basis when Groves was sacked in 2004. In his first game in charge of the club, The Mariners defeated local rivals Barnsley 6–1, with 4 goals coming from the ever-popular Phil Jevons. However, despite the good form under Rodger he was overlooked for the job and it in turn went to Nicky Law. With Grimsby suffering relegation to League Two a few months later, Law lost his job, and in stepped Russell Slade.

On 5 June 2006, Rodger would finally get his break, and was appointed as the club's full-time manager, when Slade departed to join Yeovil Town. However after a poor start to the season he was sacked on 5 November after five months in charge, with Grimsby hoping for promotion, the club found itself in the bottom third of the table. His replacement was to be Alan Buckley who in turn brought Rodger back to then club again as the Sports in the Community Officer, a previous position he had held from 1999 to 2001. Former Town midfielder Gary Childs was also given the same job.

On 6 July 2017, he was appointed as chief scout for Grimsby. He departed during the 2022–23 season.

== Honours ==
=== Player ===
Coventry City

- FA Cup: 1986–87

Grimsby Town

- Football League Second Division play-offs: 1998
- Football League Trophy: 1997–98

Individual

- Grimsby Town Player of the Year: 1997
