= 2009–10 Grimsby Town F.C. season =

Grimsby Town
2009–10 season
- Chairman: John Fenty
- Manager: Mike Newell (until 18 October 2009); Neil Woods
- Stadium: Blundell Park
- Football League Two: 23rd place
- FA Cup: First Round
- League Cup: First Round
- Football League Trophy: Regional Quarter Finals
- South West Challenge Cup: Final (withdrew)
- Lincolnshire Senior Cup: Runner Up
- Top goalscorer: League: Michael Coulson, Jamie Devitt, Barry Conlon and; Jean-Louis Akpa Akpro; (5 goals); All: Peter Sweeney (6 goals)
- Highest home attendance: 7,033 v Barnet; 1 May 2010
- Lowest home attendance: 2,103 v Bath City; 7 November 2009
Home colours	Third colours

Grimsby Town Football Club entered the 2009–10 as a member of Football League Two for the 6th season on the trot. The club are still aiming to leave Blundell Park within the next few seasons. Manager Mike Newell brought in eight players in the close season, four of which were on loan at the club the previous season, he also released eight players, the club also offered four contracts to youth team members. Manager Mike Newell also gave new contracts to midfielders Jamie Clarke and Danny Boshell. Also in the close season Assistant Manager, Stuart Watkiss did not have his contract renewed and he joined Hull City as Development Coach, and Brian Stein who was chief scout took on the responsibilities of Stuart Watkiss.

== Fixtures and results ==
=== Pre season matches ===
==== South West Challenge Cup ====
Date	Opponent	Venue	Result	Attendance	Scorers
15 July	RRFC Montegnee	Mill Road, Barnstaple	1–0	212	Clarke
17 July	Yeovil Town	Vicarage Road, Torrington	3–2	239	Conlon, North, Arnold
18 July	Rushden & Diamonds	Marshford, Appledore	4–1	–	Forbes, Akpa Akpro, Arnold, North
19 July	Luton Town	The Sports Ground, Bideford	C – C	–	--------

==== Lincolnshire Cup ====
Date	Opponent	Venue	Result	Attendance	Scorers
20 July	Scunthorpe United	Blundell Park, Cleethorpes	0–3	859	--------

==== Friendlies ====
Date	Opponent	Venue	Result	Attendance	Scorers
21 July	Leeds United	Blundell Park, Cleethorpes	1–1	3,416	Akpa Akpro
25 July	Stockport County	Edgeley Park, Stockport	0–1	1,144	--------
28 July	Doncaster Rovers	Blundell Park, Cleethorpes	0–2	1,886	--------
30 July	Gainsborough Trinity	The Northolme, Gainsborough	P – P	–	--------
1 Aug	Winterton Rangers	West Street, Winterton	12–1	–	Akpa Akpro (4), Conlon (3), North (2), Jarman, Leary, Clarke

Pre Season Top Scorers
Rank	Player	Goals
1	(France) Akpa Akpro	6
2	(Republic of Ireland) Conlon	4
=	(England) North	4
3	(England) Arnold	2
=	(England) Clarke	2
4	(England) Forbes	1
=	(England) Jarman	1
=	(England) Leary	1
As of 1 August 2009

Mike Newell took Grimsby Town to the 2009 South West Challenge Cup in Devon, in which the rules allowed him to make ten changes in each match, which he did on each occasion. They started off strong in pre-season with a one-nil win against Belgian side R.R.F.C. Montegnée, with a late free kick from Jamie Clarke. They then played in a five-goal thriller against Yeovil Town in which Grimsby Town won 3–2, with Barry Conlon, Danny North, Nathan Arnold all scoring, going on to reach the semi-final and finishing top of their group. Then continuing their strong form they beat Rushden & Diamonds 4–1 with Adrian Forbes, Jean-Louis Akpa Akpro, Nathan Arnold, Danny North all scoring, putting them into the final. After reaching the Final they had to withdraw on the grounds that they could not agree a kick-off time with their opponents Luton Town, in which there would be police at the ground, providing protection for the fans, as fans' safety concerns had been expressed earlier in the tournament. During the 2009 South West Challenge Cup Mike Newell named two trialists in his 23-man squad, who were Nathan Arnold from Mansfield Town in which he impressed by scoring two goals and he also named Swansea City striker Chris Jones in his squad, although he didn't score, he impressed enough to be offered a contract. Also joining for their last match, defender Sol Davis from Luton Town joined up for a trial.

On their return home they faced Scunthorpe United in the Lincolnshire Senior Cup Semi-Final, in which they were beaten by a strong Scunthorpe United side 3–0, after Mike Newell fielded a weakened team. Their next opponents were Leeds United, in which they drew 1–1 in front of a big crowd after Jean-Louis Akpa Akpro had put them in the lead in the first half.

They faced Stockport County in their next pre-season match and were beaten one-nil, they were without skipper Ryan Bennett, Rob Atkinson and Danny North, in a well worked play eight minutes into the second half, Poole slotted the ball under Grimsby's Nick Colgan. Both Nick Hegarty and Nathan Jarman had good chances to score but were denied by Stockport County's defence. In the second half of the match Stockport County's Matty Mainwaring went off with two fractures to his leg after a tackle from Michael Leary, new striker Chris Jones, came on for Nick Hegarty.

In their last pre-season friendly Grimsby played Northern Counties East Premier League side Winterton Rangers, the Mariners were the dominant force throughout the game with Barry Conlon grabbing a first half hat-trick in under twenty-five minutes after his first goal after eight minutes and completed his hat-trick twenty five minutes later, with a Nathan Jarman goal after his second. Winterton Rangers scored through Gary Jones after he spotted Leigh Overton off his line and chipping it into the back of the net. Nathan Jarman coming off in the first half with a suspected broken toe, which was later confirmed along with a broken metatarsal. In the second half the manager changing his squad totally with the exception of the keeper and Chris Jones, who came on for the injured Nathan Jarman, in the second half Akpa Akpro scoring four after he walked through the defence, Danny North scored a brace after chipping the keeper twice and nearly grabbing his hat-trick only for his effort to be tipped onto the bar but he later set up Michael Leary for a tap in. Clarke scored his second free kick. Grimsby had left sided Watford player Louis Lavers on trial who started in the first half in left back but moved to the left side of midfield in the second half, on the 75th minute Grimsby brought on 14-year-old Jack Barlow from the youth-team.

=== Football League Two ===
==== Results by matchday ====
Matchday	1	2	3	4	5	6	7	8	9	10	11	12	13	14	15	16	17	18	19	20	21	22	23	24	25	26	27	28	29	30	31	32	33	34	35	36	37	38	39	40	41	42	43	44	45	46
Ground	A	H	H	A	H	A	H	A	H	A	A	H	H	A	H	A	A	H	A	H	A	H	H	H	H	A	A	H	A	A	H	H	A	H	A	A	H	A	H	A	A	H	H	A	H	A
Result	L	L	L	W	L	L	W	W	D	L	L	L	L	L	D	D	D	L	D	D	D	D	D	D	D	L	D	L	D	D	D	D	L	W	L	D	W	L	L	L	W	D	L	W	W	L
Position	17	24	24	20	22	23	21	18	17	21	22	22	23	23	23	23	23	23	23	23	23	23	23	23	23	23	23	23	23	23	23	23	23	23	23	23	23	23	23	23	23	23	23	23	23	23

A = Away; H = Home; W = Win; D = Draw; L = Loss

Date	Opponent	Venue	Result	Attendance	Scorers
8 Aug	Cheltenham Town	Abbey Business Stadium, Cheltenham	1–2	3,654	Conlon
15 Aug	Crewe Alexandra	Blundell Park, Cleethorpes	0–4	5,007	--------
18 Aug	Rotherham United	Blundell Park, Cleethorpes	1–2	4,156	Sweeney
22 Aug	Bury	Gigg Lane, Bury	1–0	2,799	Conlon
29 Aug	Aldershot Town	Blundell Park, Cleethorpes	1–2	3,757	Conlon
5 Sep	Port Vale	Vale Park, Burslem, Stoke-on-Trent	0–4	5,056	--------
12 Sep	Hereford United	Blundell Park, Cleethorpes	1–0	3,173	North
19 Sep	Torquay United	Plainmoor, Torquay	2–0	2.575	Nicholson (OG), Sweeney
26 Sep	Darlington	Blundell Park, Cleethorpes	1–1	4,014	Atkinson
30 Sep	Chesterfield	Saltergate, Chesterfield	2–3	3,329	Proudlock, Sweeney
3 Oct	Barnet	Underhill, Barnet, London	0–3	2,497	--------
10 Oct	Burton Albion	Blundell Park, Cleethorpes	1–2	4,002	Jones
17 Oct	Rochdale	Blundell Park, Cleethorpes	0–2	3,754	--------
24 Oct	A.F.C. Bournemouth	Dean Court, Bournemouth	1–3	5,270	Linwood
30 Oct	Accrington Stanley	Blundell Park, Cleethorpes	2–2	4,325	Forbes, Conlon
14 Nov	Northampton Town	Sixfields Stadium, Northampton	0–0	4,028	--------
21 Nov	Lincoln City	Sincil Bank, Lincoln	0–0	4,981	--------
24 Nov	Bradford City	Blundell Park, Cleethorpes	0–3	3,646	-------
28 Nov	Macclesfield Town	Moss Rose, Macclesfield	0–0	1,409	--------
5 Dec	Dagenham & Redbridge	Blundell Park, Cleethorpes	1–1	3,090	Coulson
12 Dec	Shrewsbury Town	New Meadow, Shrewsbury	0–0	4,850	--------
18 Dec	Morecambe	Blundell Park, Cleethorpes	1–1	3,119	Sweeney
28 Dec	Port Vale	Blundell Park, Cleethorpes	1–2	4,401	Conlon
2 Jan	Bury	Blundell Park, Cleethorpes	1–1	3,463	Akpa Akpro
16 Jan	Cheltenham Town	Blundell Park, Cleethorpes	0–0	3,334	--------
23 Jan	Rotherham United	Don Valley Stadium, Sheffield	1–2	3,751	Fletcher
30 Jan	Aldershot Town	Recreation Ground, Aldershot	1–1	3,195	Grant (OG)
6 Feb	Notts County	Blundell Park, Cleethorpes	0–1	4,452	--------
13 Feb	Bradford City	Valley Parade, Bradford	0–0	11,321	--------
17 Feb	Notts County	Meadow Lane, Nottingham	1–1	5,163	Devitt
20 Feb	Lincoln City	Blundell Park, Cleethorpes	2–2	6,395	Peacock (2)
23 Feb	Macclesfield Town	Blundell Park, Cleethorpes	1–1	4,813	Devitt
27 Feb	Dagenham & Redbridge	Victoria Road, Dagenham, London	0–2	2,190	--------
6 Mar	Shrewsbury Town	Blundell Park, Cleethorpes	3–0	3,651	Sinclair (2), Akpa Akpro
9 Mar	Crewe Alexandra	Gresty Road, Crewe	2–4	3,272	Akpa Akpro, Sinclair
13 Mar	Morecambe	Christie Park, Morecambe	1–1	1,882	Coulson
20 Mar	AFC Bournemouth	Blundell Park, Cleethorpes	3–2	4,428	Devitt, Coulson, Chambers
27 Mar	Rochdale	Spotland, Rochdale	1–4	4,724	Chambers
2 Apr	Northampton Town	Blundell Park, Cleethorpes	1–2	6,482	Coulson
5 Apr	Accrington Stanley	Crown Ground, Accrington	3–2	1,839	Hudson, Coulson, Devitt
10 Apr	Hereford United	Edgar Street, Hereford	1–0	2,143	Devitt
13 Apr	Chesterfield	Blundell Park, Cleethorpes	2–2	5,648	T.Wright, Akpa Akpro
17 Apr	Torquay United	Blundell Park, Cleethorpes	0–3	5,702	--------
24 Apr	Darlington	Darlington Arena, Darlington	2–0	1,911	Lancashire, Akpa Akpro
1 May	Barnet	Blundell Park, Cleethorpes	2–0	7,033	Atkinson, Hudson
8 May	Burton Albion	Pirelli Stadium, Burton upon Trent	0–3	4,987	--------

=== FA Cup ===
Date	Opponent	Venue	Result	Attendance	Scorers
7 Nov	Bath City	Blundell Park, Cleethorpes	0–2	2,103	--------

=== League Cup ===
Date	Opponent	Venue	Result	Attendance	Scorers
11 Aug	Tranmere Rovers	Prenton Park, Tranmere	0–4	3,527	--------

=== Football League Trophy ===
Grimsby received a bye into the second round of the competition, in the Northern Section. Due to the new way of determining which teams received byes into the second round of the competition, the teams who received a bye last season, will not receive a bye two seasons in succession, the byes are now determined by recommendation at club meetings.

Date	Opponent	Venue	Result	Attendance	Scorers
6 Oct	Hartlepool United	Victoria Park, Hartlepool	2–0	1,675	Sweeney, Proudlock
10 Nov	Leeds United	Elland Road, Leeds	1–3	10,430	Sweeney

== League table ==
Notts County's season mostly made the headlines for all the wrong reasons, as they were involved in an abortive high-spending takeover by a consortium who bought in Sven-Göran Eriksson as Director of Football, and got through four managers during the course of the season. However, they managed to shake off their off-field problems and won the title. Bournemouth continued their revival under Eddie Howe and won promotion in the runners-up spot. The last automatic promotion spot was won by Rochdale, who were promoted for the first time since 1969

Dagenham and Redbridge won the play-offs, reaching the 2nd tier of the Football League for the first time in their 18-year history.

Darlington were unable to recover from losing many of their players during their spell in administration at the end of the previous season, and were relegated in bottom place, becoming only the third club (after Halifax Town and Chester City) to be relegated to the Football Conference on two separate occasions. Grimsby suffered the relegation that they only avoided the previous year due to Luton Town's points deduction; their form improved significantly in the final weeks of the season, but they were ultimately undone by a run of nearly five months without a win earlier in the season, and were relegated to the Football Conference after losing on the final day of the season.

Pos	Team	Pld	W	D	L	GF	GA	GD	Pts	Promotion, qualification or relegation
20	Lincoln City	46	13	11	22	42	65	−23	50	
21	Barnet	46	12	12	22	47	63	−16	48	
22	Cheltenham Town	46	10	18	18	54	71	−17	48	
23	Grimsby Town (R)	46	9	17	20	45	71	−26	44	Relegation to Conference National
24	Darlington (R)	46	8	6	32	33	87	−54	30	Relegation to Conference National

Updated to match(es) played on unknown. Source: football-league.co.uk
(R) Relegated

== Coaching staff ==
Role	Nationality	Name
First-Team Manager	(England)	Mike Newell (sacked 18 October 2009)
First-Team Manager	(England)	Neil Woods (hired 23 November 2009)
First-Team Assistant Manager	(England)	Brian Stein (left 30 November 2009)
First-Team Assistant Manager	(England)	Chris Casper (hired 1 December 2009)
Reserve-Team Manager	(England)	Brian Stein (left 30 November 2009)
Reserve-Team Manager	(England)	Chris Casper (hired 1 December 2009)
Youth Team Manager	(England)	Neil Woods (promoted to first team manager 23 November 2009)
Chief Scout	(England)	Brian Stein (left 30 November 2009)
Goalkeeping Coach	(England)	Steve Croudson
Physiotherapist	(England)	David Moore
Community Sport Coach	(England)	Gary Childs
Community Sport Coach	(England)	Graham Rodger

=== Appearances and goals ===
No.	Pos	Nat	Player	Total		League Two		League Cup		Football League Trophy		FA Cup	
No.	Pos	Nat	Player	Apps	Goals	Apps	Goals	Apps	Goals	Apps	Goals	Apps	Goals
1	GK	(Republic of Ireland) IRL	Nick Colgan	38	0	34	0	1	0	2	0	1	0
2	DF	(Scotland) SCO	Robbie Stockdale	9	0	8	0	1	0	0	0	0	0
3	DF	(England) ENG	Joe Widdowson	39	0	37	0	1	0	1	0	0	0
4	DF	(England) ENG	Ryan Bennett	16	0	13	0	1	0	1	0	1	0
4	MF	(England) ENG	Dean Sinclair	15	3	15	3	0	0	0	0	0	0
5	DF	(England) ENG	Matthew Heywood	1	0	1	0	0	0	0	0	0	0
6	MF	(Scotland) SCO	Peter Sweeney	40	6	37	4	1	0	2	2	0	0
7	MF	(England) ENG	Adrian Forbes	15	1	13	1	0	0	2	0	0	0
8	FW	(England) ENG	Nathan Jarman	8	0	7	0	0	0	1	0	0	0
9	FW	(England) ENG	Adam Proudlock	29	2	27	1	1	0	1	1	0	0
10	MF	(Republic of Ireland) IRL	Barry Conlon	19	5	16	5	1	0	1	0	1	0
11	MF	(England) ENG	Danny Boshell	9	0	6	0	1	0	1	0	1	0
12	DF	(England) ENG	Jamie Clarke	16	0	13	0	0	0	2	0	1	0
12	DF	(England) ENG	Jude Stirling	4	0	4	0	0	0	0	0	0	0
13	MF	(England) ENG	Nick Hegarty	10	0	9	0	1	0	0	0	0	0
14	MF	(England) ENG	Peter Bore	42	0	40	0	0	0	1	0	1	0
15	DF	(England) ENG	Matthew Bird	0	0	0	0	0	0	0	0	0	0
16	DF	(England) ENG	Paul Linwood	29	1	28	1	0	0	0	0	1	0
17	MF	(England) ENG	Grant Normington	0	0	0	0	0	0	0	0	0	0
18	FW	(Wales) WAL	Chris Jones	8	1	7	1	0	0	0	0	1	0
19	MF	(England) ENG	Michael Leary	32	0	28	0	1	0	2	0	1	0
20	GK	(England) ENG	Josh Lillis	4	0	4	0	0	0	0	0	0	0
20	MF	(Jordan) JOR	Jammal Shahin	7	0	5	0	0	0	1	0	1	0
21	GK	(England) ENG	Tommy Forecast	4	0	4	0	0	0	0	0	0	0
21	MF	(France) FRA	Arnaud Mendy	1	0	1	0	0	0	0	0	0	0
21	FW	(England) ENG	Michael Coulson	28	5	28	5	0	0	0	0	0	0
22	DF	(England) ENG	Mark Gray	0	0	0	0	0	0	0	0	0	0
23	DF	(England) ENG	Olly Lancashire	25	1	24	1	0	0	1	0	0	0
23	FW	(England) ENG	Wes Fletcher	6	1	6	1	0	0	0	0	0	0
24	FW	(Northern Ireland) NIR	Josh Magennis	2	0	2	0	0	0	0	0	0	0
24	DF	(Republic of Ireland) IRL	Damien McCrory	10	0	9	0	0	0	1	0	0	0
24	MF	(Republic of Ireland) IRL	Jamie Devitt	14	5	14	5	0	0	0	0	0	0
25	DF	(England) ENG	Rob Atkinson	39	2	35	2	1	0	2	0	1	0
26	FW	(France) FRA	Jean-Louis Akpa Akpro	39	5	35	5	1	0	2	0	1	0
27	FW	(England) ENG	Danny North	20	1	17	1	1	0	1	0	1	0
28	MF	(England) ENG	Josh Fuller	7	0	5	0	0	0	1	0	1	0
29	DF	(England) ENG	Bradley Wood	11	0	8	0	0	0	2	0	1	0
30	FW	(England) ENG	Nathan Dixon	0	0	0	0	0	0	0	0	0	0
30	MF	(England) ENG	Harry Deane	0	0	0	0	0	0	0	0	0	0
31	MF	(England) ENG	Nicky Featherstone	8	0	8	0	0	0	0	0	0	0
32	MF	(England) ENG	Mark Hudson	15	2	15	2	0	0	0	0	0	0
33	FW	(England) ENG	Ben Wright	2	0	2	0	0	0	0	0	0	0
33	FW	(England) ENG	Ashley Chambers	3	2	3	2	0	0	0	0	0	0
34	FW	(England) ENG	Paris Cowan-Hall	3	0	3	0	0	0	0	0	0	0
35	GK	(England) ENG	Leigh Overton	0	0	0	0	0	0	0	0	0	0
36	FW	(England) ENG	Tommy Wright	14	1	14	1	0	0	0	0	0	0
37	MF	(Scotland) SCO	Lee Peacock	16	2	16	2	0	0	0	0	0	0
38	GK	(England) ENG	Mark Oxley	3	0	3	0	0	0	0	0	0	0
#	GK	(England) ENG	Ed Eley	0	0	0	0	0	0	0	0	0	0
#	MF	(England) ENG	Drew Rhoades	0	0	0	0	0	0	0	0	0	0
#	MF	(England) ENG	Jamie Steel	0	0	0	0	0	0	0	0	0	0

=== Loaned out player stats ===
No.	Pos	Nat	Player	Total		League		League Cup		Football League Trophy		FA Cup	
No.	Pos	Nat	Player	Apps	Goals	Apps	Goals	Apps	Goals	Apps	Goals	Apps	Goals
4	DF	(England) ENG	Ryan Bennett (on loan at Peterborough United)	10	0	10	0	0	0	0	0	0	0
10	FW	(Republic of Ireland) IRL	Barry Conlon (on loan at Chesterfield)	4	1	4	1	0	0	0	0	0	0
15	DF	(England) ENG	Matthew Bird (on loan at Frickley Athletic)	9	0	9	0	0	0	0	0	0	0
17	MF	(England) ENG	Grant Normington (on loan at Frickley Athletic)	9	0	9	0	0	0	0	0	0	0
18	FW	(Wales) WAL	Chris Jones (on loan at Neath)	2	4	2	4	0	0	0	0	0	0
--	GK	(England) ENG	Ed Eley (on loan at Ilkeston Town)	1	0	1	0	0	0	0	0	0	0
--	GK	(England) ENG	Ed Eley (on loan at Mansfield Town)	0	0	0	0	0	0	0	0	0	0

=== Scorers ===
==== All ====
Scorer	Goals
(Scotland) Peter Sweeney	6
(England) Michael Coulson	5
(Republic of Ireland) Jamie Devitt	5
(Republic of Ireland) Barry Conlon	5
(France) Jean-Louis Akpa Akpro	5
(England) Dean Sinclair	3
(England) Adam Proudlock	2
(Scotland) Lee Peacock	2
(England) Ashley Chambers	2
(England) Rob Atkinson	2
(England) Mark Hudson	2
(England) Danny North	1
(Wales) Chris Jones	1
(England) Paul Linwood	1
(England) Adrian Forbes	1
(England) Wes Fletcher	1
(England) Tommy Wright	1
(England) Olly Lancashire	1

==== League ====
Scorer	Goals
(England) Michael Coulson	5
(Republic of Ireland) Jamie Devitt	5
(Republic of Ireland) Barry Conlon	5
(France) Jean-Louis Akpa Akpro	5
(Scotland) Peter Sweeney	4
(England) Dean Sinclair	3
(Scotland) Lee Peacock	2
(England) Ashley Chambers	2
(England) Rob Atkinson	2
(England) Mark Hudson	2
(England) Danny North	1
(England) Adam Proudlock	1
(Wales) Chris Jones	1
(England) Paul Linwood	1
(England) Adrian Forbes	1
(England) Wes Fletcher	1
(England) Tommy Wright	1
(England) Olly Lancashire	1

==== Domestic Cups ====
Scorer	Goals
(Scotland) Peter Sweeney	2
(England) Adam Proudlock	1

== Transfers ==
=== In ===
==== Pre-season ====
#	Position	Player	Previous club	Age	Fee
01	GK	(Republic of Ireland) Nick Colgan	(England) Sunderland	35	Free Transfer
03	DF	(England) Joe Widdowson	(England) West Ham United	19	Free Transfer
06	MF	(Scotland) Peter Sweeney	(England) Leeds United	24	Free Transfer
07	MF	(England) Adrian Forbes	(England) Millwall	30	Free Transfer
10	FW	(Republic of Ireland) Barry Conlon	(England) Bradford City	30	Signed as Free Agent
18	FW	(Wales) Chris Jones	(Wales) Swansea City	19	Signed as Free Agent
16	DF	(England) Paul Linwood	(England) Chester City	25	Free Transfer
19	MF	(England) Michael Leary	(England) Barnet	26	Signed as Free Agent
	GK	(England) Ed Eley	(England) Grimsby Town Youth Academy	18	Pro Contract
	MF	(England) Drew Rhoades	(England) Grimsby Town Youth Academy	18	Pro Contract
	MF	(England) Jamie Steel	(England) Grimsby Town Youth Academy	18	Pro Contract

==== Mid Season ====
#	Position	Player	From	Age	Fee
04	MF	(England) Dean Sinclair	(England) Charlton Athletic	25	Loan
12	DF	(England) Jude Stirling	(England) MK Dons	27	Loan
20	GK	(England) Josh Lillis	(England) Scunthorpe United	22	Loan
20	MF	(Jordan) Jammal Shahin	(England) Armthorpe Welfare	20	Signed
21	GK	(England) Tommy Forecast	(England) Southampton	22	Loan
21	MF	(France) Arnaud Mendy	(England) Derby County	19	Loan
21	FW	(England) Michael Coulson	(England) Barnsley	21	Loan
22	DF	(England) Mark Gray	(England) Grimsby Town Youth Academy	17	Pro Contract
23	DF	(England) Olly Lancashire	(England) Southampton	20	Loan
23	DF	(England) Olly Lancashire	(England) Southampton	20	Loan
23	FW	(England) Wes Fletcher	(England) Burnley	18	Loan
24	FW	(Northern Ireland) Josh Magennis	(Wales) Cardiff City	19	Loan
24	DF	(Republic of Ireland) Damien McCrory	(England) Plymouth Argyle	19	Loan
24	MF	(Republic of Ireland) Jamie Devitt	(England) Hull City	19	Loan
30	FW	(England) Nathan Dixon	(England) Grimsby Town Youth Academy	17	Pro Contract
30	MF	(England) Harry Deane	(England) Grimsby Town Youth Academy	17	Pro Contract
31	MF	(England) Nicky Featherstone	(England) Hull City	21	Loan
31	MF	(England) Nicky Featherstone	(England) Hull City	21	Loan
32	MF	(England) Mark Hudson	(England) Gainsborough Trinity	29	Free Transfer
33	FW	(England) Ben Wright	(England) Peterborough United	21	Loan
33	FW	(England) Ashley Chambers	(England) Leicester City	19	Loan
34	FW	(England) Paris Cowan-Hall	(England) Portsmouth	19	Loan
34	FW	(England) Paris Cowan-Hall	(England) Portsmouth	19	Loan
36	FW	(England) Tommy Wright	(Scotland) Aberdeen	25	Free Transfer
37	MF	(Scotland) Lee Peacock	(England) Swindon Town	33	Free Transfer
38	GK	(England) Mark Oxley	(England) Hull City	19	Loan

=== Out ===
==== Pre-season ====
#	Position	Player	New Club	Age	Fee
03	DF	(England) Tom Newey	(England) Bury	26	Released
07	MF	(England) Peter Till	(England) Walsall	23	Released
08	MF	(England) Paul Bolland	(England) Macclesfield Town	29	Free Transfer
10	MF	(Wales) Chris Llewellyn	(Wales) Neath Athletic	28	Free Transfer
14	MF	(England) James Hunt	(England) Gainsborough Trinity	32	Released
20	FW	(England) Andy Taylor	(England) Brigg Town	20	Released
27	MF	(France) Mickael Buscher	–	22	Released
34	GK	(England) Jonathan Lund	(England) Burnley	22	Released

==== Mid Season ====
#	Position	Player	From	Age	Fee
04	DF	(England) Ryan Bennett	(England) Peterborough United	19	Loan
04	DF	(England) Ryan Bennett	(England) Peterborough United	19	£500,000
05	DF	(England) Matthew Heywood	–	30	Released
10	FW	(Republic of Ireland) Barry Conlon	(England) Chesterfield	31	Loan
10	FW	(Republic of Ireland) Barry Conlon	(England) Chesterfield	31	Free Transfer
11	MF	(England) Danny Boshell	(England) Chesterfield	28	Free Transfer
12	DF	(England) Jamie Clarke	(England) York City	27	Free Transfer
15	DF	(England) Matthew Bird	(England) Frickley Athletic	19	Loan
17	MF	(England) Grant Normington	(England) Frickley Athletic	19	Loan
17	MF	(England) Grant Normington	(England) Frickley Athletic	19	Released
18	FW	(Wales) Chris Jones	(Wales) Neath Athletic	20	Loan
27	FW	(England) Danny North	(England) Alfreton Town	22	Released
–	GK	(England) Ed Eley	(England) Ilkeston Town	18	Loan
–	GK	(England) Ed Eley	(England) Mansfield Town	18	Loan
–	GK	(England) Ed Eley	(England) Mansfield Town	18	Loan
–	GK	(England) Ed Eley	(England) Eastwood Town	18	Free Transfer
–	MF	(England) Jamie Steel	(England) Grimsby Borough	18	Released

== Trialists ==
Manager Mike Newell took two of the trialists Nathan Arnold, Chris Jones in his 23-man squad to the 2009 South West Challenge Cup and defender Sol Davis joined up with the squad mini way through the 2009 South West Challenge Cup and was given 45 minutes to impress. Before the 2009 South West Challenge Cup Mike Newell had a number of strikers on trial, but none of them were offered a contract. Although not scoring Chris Jones impressed enough to be offered a contract by the club and which was later accepted.

=== Pre-season ===
#	Nat.	Pos.	Name	From	Age	Apps	Goals	Result
#	(England)	MF	Nathan Arnold	(England) Mansfield Town	22	4	2	Contract Offered but Declined
#	(Republic of Ireland)	FW	Graham Barrett	(Scotland) St Johnstone	27	0	0	No Contract Offered
#	(England)	DF	Sol Davis	(England) Luton Town	29	1	0	No Contract Offered
#	(Wales)	FW	Chris Jones	(Wales) Swansea City	19	3	0	Contract Offered & Accepted
#	(England)	DF	Louis Lavers	(England) Watford	18	2	0	No Contract Offered
#	(Northern Ireland)	FW	Andy Smith	(Northern Ireland) Portadown	28	0	0	No Contract Offered
#	(Italy)	GK	Kevin Strukelj	(Australia) Sydney United	24	0	0	No Contract Offered

=== Mid-season ===
#	Nat.	Pos.	Name	From	Age	Apps	Goals	Result
#	(England)	MF	Chris Arthur	(England) Queens Park Rangers	19	1	1	No contract offered
#	(Colombia)	FW	Steve Lozano-Calderon	(England) Charlton Athletic	–	1	1	No contract offered
#	(England)	DF	Chris Ramsey	(England) Manchester City	–	2	0	No contract offered
#	(England)	DF	Darren Williams	(Scotland) Dundee	32	1	0	No contract offered
#	(England)	MF	Ryan Crowther	(England) Liverpool	21	1	0	No contract offered
#	(England)	MF	Ben Osman	(England) Exeter City	19	1	0	No contract offered
#	(England)	MF	Mark Hudson	(England) Gainsborough Trinity	29	1	0	Contract Offered & Accepted
#	(England)	FW	Sean Evans	(England) Stourbridge	N/A	1	0	No contract offered
#	(Republic of Ireland)	MF	James Cronesberry	(England) Middlesbrough	19	1	0	No contract offered
#	(Scotland)	MF	Tam McManus	(Northern Ireland) Derry City	28	2	0	No contract offered
#	(Scotland)	FW	Ross Campbell	(Sweden) Ostersunds FK	22	0	0	No contract offered
#	(England)	MF	Mark Doninger	(England) Blyth Spartans	19	1	0	No contract offered
#	(England)	DF	Curtley Williams	(England) Ipswich Town	19	1	0	No contract offered
#	(England)	MF	Ryan Smith	(England) Crystal Palace	23	1	0	No contract offered
#	(Netherlands Antilles)	DF	Timothy Cathalina	(Netherlands) FC Emmen	25	1	0	No contract offered
