= 1998–99 Southend United F.C. season =

Southend United
1998–99 season
- Manager: Alvin Martin (until March 26); Alan Little
- Third Division: 18th
- FA Cup: First Round
- League Cup: Second Round
- Football League Trophy: First Round

The 1998–99 season saw Southend United compete in the Football League Third Division where they finished in 18th position with 54 points.

== Final league table ==
Pos	Team	Pld	W	D	L	GF	GA	GD	Pts
16	Barnet	46	14	13	19	54	71	−17	55
17	Brighton & Hove Albion	46	16	7	23	49	66	−17	55
18	Southend United	46	14	12	20	52	58	−6	54
19	Rochdale	46	13	15	18	42	55	−13	54
20	Torquay United	46	12	17	17	47	58	−11	53

Rules for classification: 1) Points; 2) Goals scored; 3) Goal difference

== Results ==
Southend United's score comes first

=== Legend ===
Win	Draw	Loss

=== Football League Third Division ===
Match	Date	Opponent	Venue	Result	Attendance	Scorers
1	8 August 1998	Scarborough	A	2–1	2,298	Coleman, Hails
2	15 August 1998	Shrewsbury Town	H	2–1	3,734	Clarke, Burns
3	22 August 1998	Peterborough United	A	1–1	5,323	Coleman
4	29 August 1998	Chester City	H	0–1	4,421	
5	1 September 1998	Carlisle United	A	0–3	2,638	
6	5 September 1998	Rotherham United	H	3–0	3,479	Newman, Fitzpatrick (2)
7	8 September 1998	Halifax Town	H	0–0	3,620	
8	12 September 1998	Brighton & Hove Albion	A	2–0	3,840	Conlon, Whyte
9	19 September 1998	Cambridge United	H	0–1	5,009	
10	26 September 1998	Swansea City	A	1–3	3,890	Newman
11	3 October 1998	Rochdale	H	1–1	3,686	Maher
12	10 October 1998	Scunthorpe United	H	1–1	3,686	Maher
13	17 October 1998	Leyton Orient	H	2–2	6,700	Clarke, Fitzpatrick
14	20 October 1998	Mansfield Town	H	1–2	3,250	Whyte
15	24 October 1998	Hull City	A	1–1	3,551	Conlon
16	31 October 1998	Darlington	H	2–1	3,527	Maher, Newman
17	7 November 1998	Exeter City	A	1–2	3,085	Burns
18	10 November 1998	Brentford	A	1–4	4,285	Burns
19	21 November 1998	Plymouth Argyle	H	1–0	3,814	Newman
20	28 November 1998	Cardiff City	A	0–2	4,638	
21	12 December 1998	Barnet	H	2–3	4,311	Coleman, Burns
22	19 December 1998	Hartlepool United	A	4–2	1,889	Houghton, Newman, Fitzpatrick, Conlon
23	26 December 1998	Peterborough United	H	2–0	6,159	Newman, Fitzpatrick
24	28 December 1998	Torquay United	A	0–2	3,228	
25	2 January 1999	Chester City	A	1–1	2,574	Newman
26	9 January 1999	Scarborough	H	1–0	3,453	Livett
27	16 January 1999	Shrewsbury Town	A	1–3	2,132	Maher
28	23 January 1999	Carlisle United	H	0–1	4,120	
29	30 January 1999	Torquay United	H	0–0	3,567	
30	6 February 1999	Rotherham United	A	2–2	3,895	Rapley (2)
31	13 February 1999	Halifax Town	A	1–3	2,302	Rapley
32	20 February 1999	Brighton & Hove Albion	H	3–0	6,066	Rapley, Barry Hunter (2)
33	27 February 1999	Cambridge United	A	0–3	5,013	
34	6 March 1999	Swansea City	H	2–0	3,713	Conlon, Roach
35	13 March 1999	Exeter City	H	0–0	3,695	
36	20 March 1999	Darlington	A	1–2	2,516	Conlon
37	26 March 1999	Hull City	H	0–1	4,149	
38	30 March 1999	Rochdale	A	0–1	1,334	
39	3 April 1999	Leyton Orient	A	3–0	6,515	Campbell (2), Coleman
40	5 April 1999	Scunthorpe United	H	0–1	4,814	
41	10 April 1999	Mansfield Town	A	0–0	2,624	
42	13 April 1999	Cardiff City	H	0–1	4,076	
43	17 April 1999	Plymouth Argyle	A	3–0	3,949	Conlon (2), Houghton
44	24 April 1999	Brentford	H	1–4	5,428	Clarke
45	1 May 1999	Barnet	A	2–0	2,704	Houghton, Hodges
46	8 May 1999	Hartlepool United	H	1–1	4,865	Maher

=== FA Cup ===
Round	Date	Opponent	Venue	Result	Attendance	Scorers
R1	14 November 1998	Doncaster Rovers	H	0–1	3,740	

=== League Cup ===
Round	Date	Opponent	Venue	Result	Attendance	Scorers
R1 1st Leg	11 August 1998	Gillingham	H	1–0	2,509	Newman
R1 2nd Leg	18 August 1998	Gillingham	A	1–0	3,417	Clarke
R2 1st Leg	16 September 1998	Coventry City	A	0–1	6,631	
R2 2nd Leg	22 September 1998	Coventry City	H	0–4	6,292	

=== Football League Trophy ===
Round	Date	Opponent	Venue	Result	Attendance	Scorers
R1	5 January 1999	Exeter City	A	1–3	1,143	Maher

== Squad statistics ==
Pos.	Name	League		FA Cup		League Cup		Other		Total	
Pos.	Name	Apps	Goals	Apps	Goals	Apps	Goals	Apps	Goals	Apps	Goals
GK	(England) Mel Capleton	14	0	0	0	0	0	0	0	14	0
GK	(Wales) Martyn Margetson	32	0	1	0	4	0	1	0	38	0
DF	(England) Mark Beard	36(1)	0	1	0	1	0	1	0	39(1)	0
DF	(England) Martyn Booty	12(2)	0	0	0	0	0	0	0	12(2)	0
DF	(England) Simon Coleman	41(1)	4	1	0	4	0	1	0	47(1)	4
DF	(Australia) Chris Coyne	0(1)	0	0	0	0	0	0	0	0(1)	0
DF	(England) Keith Dublin	6(3)	0	0	0	1(1)	0	1	0	8(4)	0
DF	(England) Barry Hunter	5	2	0	0	0	0	0	0	5	2
DF	(Wales) Nathan Jones	5(12)	0	0(1)	0	1(1)	0	0(1)	0	6(14)	0
DF	(England) Simon Livett	19(4)	1	1	0	1	0	1	0	22(4)	1
DF	(England) Dave Morley	26(1)	0	0(1)	0	2	0	0	0	28(2)	0
DF	(England) Rob Newman	36	7	1	0	4	1	1	0	42	8
DF	(England) Leo Roget	11(3)	0	0	0	1	0	0	0	12(3)	0
DF	(England) Mark Stimson	17	0	1	0	4	0	0	0	21	0
MF	(England) Adrian Clarke	14(10)	3	1	0	3	1	0	0	18(10)	3
MF	(England) Mick Gooding	19(4)	0	0	0	2	0	1	0	22(4)	0
MF	(England) Julian Hails	11	1	0	0	4	0	0	0	15	1
MF	(South Africa) Andy Harris	1	0	0	0	0	0	0	0	1	0
MF	(England) Lee Hodges	10	1	0	0	0	0	0	0	10	1
MF	(England) Scott Houghton	26(1)	3	0	0	0	0	1	0	27(1)	3
MF	(Republic of Ireland) Kevin Maher	34	4	1	0	4	0	1	1	40	5
MF	(England) Mark Patterson	5	0	0	0	0	0	0	0	5	0
MF	(Germany) Lars Unger	14	0	0	0	0	0	0	0	14	0
FW	(Scotland) Alex Burns	26(5)	5	1	0	3	0	1	0	31(5)	5
FW	(England) Neil Campbell	9(3)	2	0	0	0	0	0	0	9(3)	2
FW	(Republic of Ireland) Barry Conlon	28(6)	7	1	0	0	0	1	0	30(6)	7
FW	(England) Miguel de Souza	2	0	0	0	1(1)	0	0	0	3(1)	0
FW	(England) Trevor Fitzpatrick	7(16)	5	0(1)	0	0(1)	0	1(2)	0	8(18)	5
FW	(Nigeria) Dominic Iorfa	0(2)	0	0	0	0	0	0	0	0(2)	0
FW	(England) Steve McGavin	4(7)	0	0	0	0	0	0	0	4(7)	0
FW	(England) Kevin Rapley	9	4	0	0	0	0	0	0	9	4
FW	(England) Neville Roach	7(1)	1	0	0	0	0	0	0	7(1)	1
FW	(England) David Whyte	14(4)	2	1	0	3	0	0	0	19(4)	2
