= Dean Sinclair =

English footballer

Personal information
- Full name: Dean Michael Sinclair
- Date of birth: 17 December 1984 (age 41)
- Place of birth: St Albans, England
- Position: Midfielder

Youth career
- 1998–2002: Norwich City

Senior career*
Years	Team	Apps	(Gls)
2002–2004	Norwich City	2	(0)
2004–2007	Barnet	125	(19)
2007–2010	Charlton Athletic	0	(0)
2007	→ Cheltenham Town (loan)	12	(1)
2008	→ Cheltenham Town (loan)	3	(0)
2009	→ Grimsby Town (loan)	9	(1)
2009–2010	→ Barnet (loan)	3	(1)
2010	→ Grimsby Town (loan)	16	(3)
2010–2011	Grimsby Town	12	(3)
2011	→ Cambridge United (loan)	6	(1)
2011	Arlesey Town	6	(0)
2011–2012	Hayes & Yeading United	2	(1)
2011–2012	→ Arlesey Town (loan)	11	(0)
2012	Lowestoft Town	18	(5)
2012–2013	Woking	21	(1)
2013–2014	Sutton United	45	(6)
2014–2015	Eastbourne Borough	24	(2)
2015–2016	Hampton & Richmond Borough	39	(8)
Total		353	(52)

International career
2004–2005	England C	5	(1)
- * Club domestic league appearances and goals

Dean Michael Sinclair (born 17 December 1984) is an English former professional footballer who played as a midfielder.

Sinclair came through the Norwich City youth academy and was promoted to the club's first team in 2002. He struggled to make an impact and joined Barnet two years later. He made 125 appearances for the club before joining Charlton Athletic, where he again struggled to hold down a place in the first team and eventually spent time on loan with Cheltenham Town and Grimsby Town as well as briefly returning to Barnet for a month. In 2010, he returned to Grimsby on a permanent basis but the season ended with a loan at Cambridge United. Following his release from Grimsby in 2011 he went on to have spells with Arlesey Town, Hayes & Yeading and Lowestoft Town before signing with Woking in August 2012. He was released just a few months later and signed with Sutton United in February 2013.

Whilst with Barnet, Sinclair was capped 5 times by the England C team, scoring one goal.

== Career ==
=== Norwich City ===
Sinclair career started at Norwich under Nigel Worthington, where he came through the youth system. Worthington promoted Sinclair to the club's first team at the start of the 2002–03 season. With the club playing in the First Division Sinclair made his debut on 25 February 2003 in the club's 1–0 away defeat against Gillingham where he played from the start before being replaced by Ian Henderson in the 83rd minute. On 15 March he came on for Mark Rivers in the 89th minute of the club's 2–0 win over Coventry City at Carrow Road. Sinclair was kept on by The Canaries during the 2003–04 season but failed to make a single appearance and was only named on the substitute's bench a handful of times. In the summer of 2004 Worthington released Sinclair after 16 months without any first team football.

=== Barnet ===
Sinclair signed with Conference National side Barnet in August 2004. He made his debut 14 August 2004 in the club's 3–1 victory over Forest Green Rovers. During this season the club earned promotion to the Football League with Sinclair playing in 39 league matches scoring 9 goals the first of them coming against Northwich Victoria on 28 August 2004. During the 2005–06 season Sinclair scored against Manchester United at Old Trafford in the League Cup on 26 October 2005, whilst Barnet were 3–0 down, they eventually lost 4–1. He decided to leave Barnet at the end of the 2006–07 season, as his contract was up.

=== Charlton Athletic ===
In the summer of 2007, after a successful trial period, Sinclair joined Alan Pardew's Charlton Athletic for a fee of £125,000. The club had recently been relegated from the Premier League and were preparing for their first season in the second tier of English football since being promoted in 2000. Sinclair made his Addicks debut on 14 August 2007 in the club's 2–0 League Cup win over Swindon Town with Sinclair making a 78th minute appearance as a replacement for Andy Reid. Sinclair's next appearance would be in the second round of the same competition where he started and scored a 4th-minute goal against Luton Town, however after extra time Charlton lost the match 3–1. In October 2007, he joined Cheltenham Town on a month's loan, rejoining Cheltenham on another months loan in August 2008. On 8 January Sinclair signed a one-month loan deal with Mike Newell's Grimsby Town, which was later extended. Injury curtailed his stay at Blundell Park and he returned to Charlton. In November 2009, Sinclair rejoined Barnet on loan. He scored against Crewe Alexandra, but was sent off against Northampton Town and his loan spell was not renewed. On 28 January, he re-joined Grimsby Town on loan for the rest of the 2009–10 season. Grimsby suffered relegation from the Football League in May 201. Sinclair returned to Charlton but was released from the club having only played two games in three seasons at The Valley, none of which were league appearances.

=== Grimsby Town ===
On 29 November 2010, after being without a club for the first four months of the 2010–11 season, Sinclair approached former club Grimsby Town to take a look at him. Sinclair began training with Grimsby again with the hope of a permanent deal in mind. Sinclair signed a deal until the end of the 2010–11 season on 9 December. Sinclair made his third debut for The Mariners in the club's 3–0 FA Trophy victory over Redditch United. Following the sacking of Neil Woods in February 2011, and despite scoring three goals in ten games Sinclair was loaned out to Cambridge United until the rest of the season on 25 March 2011 following the arrival of joint-manager's Rob Scott and Paul Hurst. and made his debut on 2 April against Altrincham. Sinclair returned to Grimsby at the end of the 10–11 season and was released.

=== Arlesey Town and Hayes & Yeading United ===
In August 2011 Sinclair played for Southern League Premier Division side Arlesey Town in a friendly against Kettering Town. He then joined the club on a short-term deal, playing 11 times scoring 1 goal.

On 4 November Sinclair moved back up the football pyramid by signing with Conference National side Hayes & Yeading United. Sinclair played two games for the club, scoring once before returning to Arlesey on loan.

=== Lowestoft Town, Woking and Sutton United ===
Sinclair joined Lowestoft Town on 16 February 2012. Sinclair joined Woking F.C. on 7 August 2012. Sinclair left Woking on 8 January 2013, having played 21 times in the league, scoring once in a 5–1 defeat against former club Grimsby Town.

In February 2013, Sinclair signed with Conference South side Sutton United. He left the club following the 2013–14 season, in which Sutton reached the playoffs with a second-place finish, but were knocked out in the semi-finals by eventual winners Dover Athletic.

=== Eastbourne Borough ===
Following his departure from Sutton, Sinclair joined league rivals Eastbourne Borough.

=== Hampton and Richmond Borough ===
Sinclair was released by Eastbourne towards the end of the 2014–15 season and subsequently went on to sign for Hampton & Richmond Borough.

== Honours ==
=== Barnet ===
- Conference National Winner 2004–05

=== Hampton & Richmond Borough ===
- Isthmian League Premier Division Winner 2015–16

== Career statistics ==
Appearances and goals by club, season and competition
Club	Season	League			FA Cup		League Cup		Other		Total	
Club	Season	Division	Apps	Goals	Apps	Goals	Apps	Goals	Apps	Goals	Apps	Goals
Norwich City	2002–03	First Division	2	0	0	0	0	0	0	0	2	0
Norwich City	2003–04	First Division	0	0	0	0	0	0	0	0	0	0
Norwich City	Total		2	0	0	0	0	0	0	0	2	0
Barnet	2004–05	Conference Premier	39	11	2	0	—		1 (Note: Appearance(s) in Football League Trophy)	0	42	11
Barnet	2005–06	League Two	44	2	1	0	2	1	1	1	48	4
Barnet	2006–07	League Two	42	6	3	2	2	0	2	0	49	8
Barnet	Total		124	19	6	2	4	1	4	1	137	23
Charlton Athletic	2007–08	Championship	0	0	0	0	2	1	0	0	2	1
Charlton Athletic	2008–09	Championship	0	0	0	0	0	0	0	0	0	0
Charlton Athletic	2009–10	League One	0	0	0	0	0	0	0	0	0	0
Charlton Athletic	Total		0	0	0	0	2	1	0	0	2	1
Cheltenham Town (loan)	2007–08	League One	12	1	0	0	0	0	2	0	14	1
Cheltenham Town (loan)	2008–09	League One	3	0	0	0	0	0	0	0	3	0
Grimsby Town (loan)	2008–09	League Two	9	1	0	0	0	0	0	0	9	1
Barnet (loan)	2009–10	League Two	3	1	1	0	0	0	0	0	4	1
Grimsby Town (loan)	2009–10	League Two	16	3	0	0	0	0	0	0	16	3
Grimsby Town	2010–11	Conference Premier	12	3	0	0	—		1 (Note: Appearance(s) in FA Trophy)	0	13	3
Cambridge United	2010–11	Conference Premier	6	1	0	0	—		0	0	6	1
Arlesey Town	2011–12	Southern League Premier Division	6	0	4	0	—		0	0	10	0
Hayes & Yeading United	2011–12	Conference Premier	2	1	0	0	—		0	0	2	1
Arlesey Town	2011–12	Southern League Premier Division	11	0	1	1	—		1 (Note: Appearance(s) in Bedfordshire Senior Cup)	0	13	1
Lowestoft Town	2011–12	Isthmian League Premier Division	18	5	0	0	—		2 (Note: Appearance(s) in Suffolk Premier Cup)	0	20	5
Woking	2012–13	Conference Premier	21	1	0	0	—		2	0	23	1
Sutton United	2012–13	Conference South	16	2	0	0	—		2 (Note: Appearance(s) in Surrey Senior Cup)	0	18	2
Sutton United	2013–14	Conference South	29	4	1	0	—		3 (Note: 1 appearance in Surrey Senior Cup, 2 appearances in Conference South play-offs)	0	33	4
Sutton United	Total		45	6	1	0	0	0	5	0	51	6
Eastbourne Borough	2014–15	Conference South	24	2	2	0	—		0	0	26	2
Hampton & Richmond Borough	2014–15	Isthmian League Premier Division	6	0	0	0	—		0	0	6	0
Hampton & Richmond Borough	2015–16	Isthmian League Premier Division	33	8	1	0	—		5 (Note: 4 appearances in FA Trophy, 1 appearance in Middlesex Senior Cup)	0	39	8
Hampton & Richmond Borough	Total		39	8	1	0	0	0	5	0	45	8
Career total			353	52	16	3	6	2	22	1	397	58
