= Paul Linwood =

English footballer

Personal information
- Full name: Paul Anthony Linwood
- Date of birth: 24 October 1983 (age 43)
- Place of birth: Birkenhead, Merseyside, England
- Height: 6 ft 2 in (1.88 m)
- Position: Central defender

Youth career
- 2000–2002: Tranmere Rovers

Senior career*
Years	Team	Apps	(Gls)
2002–2006	Tranmere Rovers	44	(0)
2005	→ Wrexham (loan)	9	(0)
2006–2009	Chester City	122	(4)
2009–2010	Grimsby Town	28	(1)
2010–2012	Fleetwood Town	21	(0)
2012–2014	Chester	58	(2)
2014–2015	Salford City	28	(1)
2015–2016	Connah's Quay Nomads	29	(3)
2016–2017	Ramsbottom United	32	(3)
2017–2018	Trafford		(3)
- * Club domestic league appearances and goals

Paul Anthony Linwood (born 24 October 1983) is an English former professional footballer who played as a central defender.

He has previously played professionally in the Football League for Tranmere Rovers, Wrexham, Chester City and Grimsby Town and in the Cymru Premier for Connah's Quay Nomads. He also played at Non-league level for Fleetwood Town, Chester, Salford City, Ramsbottom United and Trafford.

== Career ==
=== Tranmere Rovers ===
Born in Birkenhead, Linwood was educated in Wirral at Hilbre High School. Linwood was with hometown club Tranmere Rovers from 2002 to 2006, having been a trainee previously. He made his first-team debut in an EFL Trophy tie at Blackpool in October 2003, with his Football League debut following a few days later in a 2–1 win over Oldham Athletic. Linwood spent the start of the 2005–2006 season on loan to Wrexham, before enjoying a short spell back in the Tranmere first-team.

=== Chester City ===
In the summer of 2006 he opted to join neighbours Chester City, with a £15,000 transfer fee set at tribunal. He made his Chester debut as the Blues beat Accrington Stanley on 5 August 2006, the club he would score his first league goal for Chester against later in the season. He also found the net in a Football League Trophy tie at Chesterfield during the campaign. As he became an established figure at the Deva Stadium, he was voted the Chester City's player of the season for 2007–08. He was named the official captain after a contract dispute involving fellow defender Paul Butler, a role he maintained during the 2008–09 campaign. The season saw him score twice in 43 league matches as the club suffered relegation from The Football League.

=== Grimsby Town ===
On 3 July 2009, Linwood signed a three-year contract at League Two side Grimsby Town. Grimsby manager Mike Newell had been impressed with Linwood's performances for his former club Chester whilst playing against Grimsby in the previous season. Despite a glowing reference from his new boss, Linwood found himself playing second fiddle to the preferred centre half pairing of Ryan Bennett and Robert Atkinson, this was until Bennett was sold which allowed Linwood an extended run in the first team, until the club opted to sign Olly Lancashire on loan.

On 12 May 2010, Linwood was one of seven players placed on the transfer list by manager Neil Woods after their relegation from the Football League.

=== Non-league ===
On 29 June 2010 Linwood signed a 3-year deal with newly promoted Conference Premier side Fleetwood Town. He was released by the club in May 2012.

On 30 May 2012 he returned to the city of Chester to play for newly promoted Conference North side Chester. Linwood previously played for Chester City before their demise in 2010. Linwood scored his first goal for the club in the 2–0 home win over Oxford City.

In the summer of 2014 he moved to Salford City. He made his club debut in the opening league match of the season on 16 August as Salford beat Scarborough 4–1.

In 2017 he moved to Trafford.

== Podcast controversy ==
In May 2019, Linwood appeared on the I Had Trials Once podcast on Spotify, in the interview he spoke about his time at Grimsby Town during the 2009–10 season. Linwood went on to explain that he and other players never took to living in Grimsby and that the team was full of alcoholics. He claimed that the clubs biggest mistake was sacking Mike Newell who had joined in with the drinking, and that the players had never taken to his replacement Neil Woods.

Speaking of Newell and Woods, Linwood said "We had loads of days and nights out, and we were turning it round. He had a falling out upstairs after one of the games, and he got the sack. The Youth Team manager took over. Now the Youth Team manager saw the older-ish lads there, and he just hated it. We all had a drink anyway, and Newelly used to join us – he was always with us, him and his assistant. He used to ring on a Tuesday and go 'where are you?'

'Nowhere gaffer, we're just in Costa'. 'I know you're in the pub, I'm coming!' It was good under Newelly, and the Youth Team manager came in and just hated all that. But it's the worst thing he could have done because the players just rebelled against him, and there were a lot of big characters in that dressing room he couldn't handle."

Linwood added that "You'd finish training, Adam Proudlock on the Whatsapp group would say 'lads, I'm just having a pint at the Laceby Arms', and the whole squad would be in there. 15 pints, easy. It was the only pub we could get away with it. It was in a tiny little village, and we were dead inconspicuous – we used to go in our kits! Even I turned round one day and said 'this has gone too far'. We'd had a Monday session – straight after training, we finished boozing about five that morning, and then we were in for training at nine the next day. Adam Proudlock and Peter Sweeney came to pick us up, and both were just the most unbelievable players who had just tossed it off at this point. Those two came to pick me up after a session, and we were drinking cans of Fosters on the way to training, which is out of order because I f***ing hate Fosters!" Grimsby Town would go on to finish 23rd in League Two and were relegated from the Football League for the first time in their 122-year history.

When the podcast went viral in January 2020, fans of Grimsby Town reacted with anger and contempt and began abusing Linwood on his social media accounts. Linwood on a follow-up podcast refused to apologise to Grimsby supporters saying "F***ing not one of them because they abused me for f***ing months after it, so they can f*** off, all of them."

== Career statistics ==
As of 10 May 2017

Appearances and goals by club, season and competition
Club	Season	League			National Cup		League Cup		Other		Total	
Club	Season	Division	Apps	Goals	Apps	Goals	Apps	Goals	Apps	Goals	Apps	Goals
Tranmere Rovers	2002–03	Second Division	0	0	0	0	0	0	0	0	0	0
Tranmere Rovers	2003–04	Second Division	20	0	1	0	0	0	1	0	25	0
Tranmere Rovers	2004–05	League One	10	0	0	0	0	0	1 (Note: Appearance(s) in Football League Trophy)	0	11	0
Tranmere Rovers	2005–06	League One	14	0	2	0	0	0	2	0	18	0
Tranmere Rovers	Total		44	0	3	0	0	0	4	0	51	0
Wrexham (loan)	2005–06	League Two	9	0	—		—		0	0	9	0
Chester City	2006–07	League Two	37	1	2	0	1	0	1	1	41	2
Chester City	2007–08	League Two	42	1	1	0	1	0	2	0	46	1
Chester City	2008–09	League Two	43	2	1	0	1	0	1	0	46	2
Chester City	Total		122	4	4	0	3	0	4	1	133	5
Grimsby Town	2009–10	League Two	28	1	1	0	0	0	0	0	29	1
Fleetwood Town	2010–11	Conference Premier	18	0	1	0	—		1 (Note: Appearance(s) in Conference Premier play-offs)	0	20	0
Fleetwood Town	2011–12	Conference Premier	3	0	0	0	—		0	0	3	0
Fleetwood Town	Total		21	0	1	0	—		1	0	23	0
Chester	2011–12	Conference North	30	1	2	0	—		4 (Note: Two appearances in FA Trophy, two appearances in Cheshire Senior Cup)	0	36	1
Chester	2013–14	Conference Premier	28	1	0	0	—		2 (Note: One appearance in FA Trophy, one appearance in Cheshire Senior Cup)	0	30	1
Chester	Total		58	2	2	0	—		6	0	66	2
Salford City	2014–15	NPL Premier Division One North	28	1	5	0	1	0	1 (Note: Appearance(s) in FA Trophy)	0	35	1
Connah's Quay Nomads	2015–16	Welsh Premier League	29	3	4	0	2	0	2	0	37	3
Ramsbottom United	2016–17	NPL Premier Division One North	32	3	1	0	1	0	4	0	38	3
Career total			371	14	21	0	7	0	22	1	421	15

== Honours ==
Chester City

- Player of the Season: 2007–08

Chester FC

- Peter Swales Shield Winners 2012
- Conference North Winners 2012–13
- Cheshire Senior Cup Winners 2012–13

Salford City

- Northern Premier League Division One North Winners 2014–15
