= Jammal Shahin =

English footballer (born 1988)

Personal information
- Full name: Jammal Shahin
- Date of birth: 19 December 1988 (age 37)
- Place of birth: Grimsby, England
- Height: 5 ft 11 in (1.80 m)
- Position: Midfielder

Youth career
- 2004–2007: Grimsby Town

Senior career*
Years	Team	Apps	(Gls)
2007–2009	Armthorpe Welfare		
2009–2010	Grimsby Town	5	(0)
2010	Selby Town		
2010–2011	Cleethorpes Town		
2011–2012	Spalding United		
2012	Brigg Town		
2012	Selby Town		
2012–2014	Grimsby Borough		
2017–2018	Grimsby Borough		
- * Club domestic league appearances and goals as of 19:27, 3 July 2010 (UTC)

Jammal Shahin (born 19 December 1988) is an English former footballer who played as a midfielder.

Shahin notably played in the Football League as a professional for Grimsby Town during the 2009–19 season. He then went on to play Non-league football for Armthorpe Welfare, Selby Town, Cleethorpes Town, Spalding United, Brigg Town and Grimsby Borough.

== Early life ==
Jammal Shahin was born on 19 December 1988 in Grimsby, Lincolnshire.

== Career ==
Shahin came through the youth ranks at Grimsby Town, and notably scored the winning goal in the clubs' 1–0 Midlands Floodlit Youth Cup final victory over Walsall in 2006. Shahin was a regular in Neil Woods side but in 2007 he was snubbed a professional contract and therefore was released. He went on to sign for Yorkshire semi professional side Armthorpe Welfare and later played as an amateur in the Grimsby League's for Lincs International FC and A & G Auto Repairs FC.

In September 2009, his former Grimsby youth coach Neil Woods recommended him to first-team manager Mike Newell, who after offering Shahin a trial would go on to sign the player on a contract until the end of the 2009–10 season. Shahin made his professional debut on 17 October, in a 2–0 home defeat against Rochdale. He would go on to make 7 appearances in all competitions for Grimsby, notably playing in the 3–1 Football League Trophy quarter-final defeat against Leeds United. He was never once on the winning side, playing out 2 draws and 5 defeats and was part of the Mariners side that was relegated from the Football League.

Shahin was released by Grimsby on 12 May 2010. In August 2010, he signed for non-League side Selby Town.

In November 2010, he joined Cleethorpes Town and later played for Spalding United and Brigg Town before returning to Selby Town. He signed for Grimsby Borough in 2012 and again in 2017.
