= Bradley Wood =

English footballer (born 1991)

Personal information
- Full name: Bradley Alan Wood
- Date of birth: 2 September 1991 (age 35)
- Place of birth: Leicester, England
- Positions: Right-back; defensive midfielder

Team information
- Current team: Grimsby Borough

Youth career
- 2007–2009: Grimsby Town

Senior career*
Years	Team	Apps	(Gls)
2009–2013	Grimsby Town	113	(1)
2013–2015	Alfreton Town	89	(9)
2015–2017	Lincoln City	74	(3)
2017–2018	Alfreton Town	36	(0)
2024–	Grimsby Borough	0	(0)
2025	→ Louth Town (dual registration)	5	(0)

International career^{‡}
2013	England C	1	(0)
- * Club domestic league appearances and goals as of 21 December 2017 ‡ National team caps and goals as of 13:25, 12 September 2013 (UTC)

Bradley Alan Wood (born 2 September 1991) is an English footballer who plays as a right back for Grimsby Borough.

He began his career at Grimsby Town where he was also used as a left back and winger. At international level he has represented England C. He later moved on to Alfreton before joining Lincoln City. He was part of the Imps side that won the National League and reached the FA Cup quarter final during the 2016–17 season. He is served a six-year ban from all football activity, which was imposed by the Football Association for betting related match fixing, meaning he was inactive from 2018 until 2024.

== Club career ==
=== Grimsby Town ===
Wood is a versatile player who was promoted to the club's first team squad midway through the 2008–09 season as a makeshift defender from the youth team. He was named as a substitute once for The Mariners. In the 2009–10 season, Wood did not receive a squad number until his club fell victim to an injury crisis which saw him named as a substitute in the away defeat against Port Vale. On 26 September Wood made his first team debut playing from the start against Darlington in place of regular right back Robbie Stockdale. The match finished 1–1 with Wood making his debut at right back and was named Man of the Match. Wood continued this role filling in for the injured Stockdale, and also played as a makeshift left back in the place of Joe Widdowson on the odd occasion.

On 16 October Wood signed a 4-year professional contract with Grimsby. He provided an injury-time assist in the 2–2 draw with Accrington Stanley on 30 October when his long ball assisted a Barry Conlon 95th-minute equaliser. At the time he was playing as an emergency centre back following the sending off of defender Olly Lancashire.

On 3 May 2010, Wood scored the winning goal for Grimsby Towns youth team in a 1–0 win over Shrewsbury Town's youth team in the Midland Floodlit Youth cup final. Wood was named Grimsby Town supporters Young Player of the Year for the 2010–11 season.

During the 2012–13 season Wood was ever present as the club missed out on lifting the FA Trophy at Wembley Stadium and despite leading the Conference for the majority of the season Town were to lose out in the play-offs to Newport County. Wood was released by Town on 2 May 2013, at the time he had been the club's current longest serving player. He bowed out of Grimsby having made 113 league appearances, scoring 1 goal.

=== Alfreton Town ===
On 28 May 2013 it was announced that Wood had signed for Alfreton Town on a one-year contract. He made his debut in the 1–0 defeat to Dartford on the opening day of the season and scored his first goal at the end of September in a defeat to Braintree Town. After featuring in 49 of Alfreton's 50 games in 2013–14 he was named as the Supporters Player of the Season and the following month signed a new two-year contract, keeping him at the club until 2016.

=== Lincoln City ===
He signed a 2-year contract at Lincoln City for the start of the 2015–16 season. Wood was voted as Lincoln's "Player of the Season" during his first season at the club. During the 2016–17 season Wood contributed to the Imps' campaign that saw them reach the FA Cup quarter final which resulted in a 5–0 defeat to Arsenal. Lincoln would also secure a return to the Football League after being crowned National League champions. Towards the end of the season Wood was found guilty of a drink driving offence and although he wasn't officially announced as being released, he was not featured in the retained list.

=== Return to Alfreton Town ===
He returned to Alfreton Town in August 2017. On 19 April 2018, Wood received a six-year ban from all football activity by the Football Association for match fixing. This expired on 8 March 2024.

=== Grimsby Borough ===
Following the end of his ban, Wood signed for non-league side Grimsby Borough.

== International career ==
Wood made his debut for England C in September 2013, coming off the bench in a 1–0 defeat to Latvia under-23s. He was called into the squad again the following year for the game against Jordan under-23s.

== Personal life ==
In February 2017 Wood was banned from driving for 12 months after being convicted of drink driving. In July 2017 he was caught driving whilst on his ban.

Wood pleaded guilty to assault following an incident at North Kesteven Leisure Centre in North Hykeham in August 2017, he was fined £154 and ordered to pay £100 compensation and a victim surcharge of £30.

On 19 April 2018 Wood was handed a six-year suspension from all football activity by the Football Association. The tribunal ruled that Wood's bookings in two FA Cup matches were intentional whilst playing for Lincoln City in their FA Cup victories over Ipswich Town and Burnley during the 2016–17 season. Betting companies reported that seven individuals placed bets on Wood being booked in both games, two of whom were identified as close friends of Wood. He also admitted 22 charges of betting on games himself.

== Career statistics ==
As of match played 16 December 2017

Appearances and goals by club, season and competition
Club	Season	League			FA Cup		League Cup		Other		Total	
Club	Season	Division	Apps	Goals	Apps	Goals	Apps	Goals	Apps	Goals	Apps	Goals
Grimsby Town	2009–10	League Two	8	0	1	0	0	0	2 (Note: Appearances in the Football League Trophy)	0	11	0
Grimsby Town	2010–11	Conference Premier	43	0	2	0	—		2 (Note: Appearances in the FA Trophy)	0	47	0
Grimsby Town	2010–11	Conference Premier	32	1	5	0	—		3	0	40	1
Grimsby Town	2012–13	Conference Premier	30	0	1	0	—		5	0	36	0
Grimsby Town	Total		113	1	9	0	0	0	12	0	134	1
Alfreton Town	2013–14	Conference Premier	45	2	2	0	—		2 (Note: One appearance in the FA Trophy, one in the Derbyshire Senior Cup)	0	49	2
Alfreton Town	2014–15	Conference Premier	44	7	2	1	—		3 (Note: Two appearances and a goal in the FA Trophy; one appearance and a goal in the Lincolnshire Senior Cup)	2	49	10
Alfreton Town	Total		89	9	4	1	—		5	2	99	12
Lincoln City	2015–16	National League	40	1	3	0	—		1	0	44	1
Lincoln City	2016–17	National League	34	2	9	0	—		6	0	49	2
Lincoln City	Total		74	3	12	0	—		7	0	93	3
Alfreton Town	2017–18	National League North	18	0	0	0	—		0	0	18	0
Career total			294	13	25	1	0	0	24	2	343	16

== Honours ==
Grimsby Town

- Young Player of the Year: 2010–11

Alfreton Town

- Supporters Player of the Year: 2013–14

Lincoln City

- National League: 2016–17
- Player of the Year: 2015–16
