= Livett =

Livett is a surname. Notable people with the surname include:

- Harvey Livett (born 1997), English rugby league footballer
- Simon Livett (born 1969), English football midfielder
- RAH Livett (1898–1959), English architect
