= Normington =

Normington may refer to:

- Wynn Normington Hugh-Jones (1923–2019), former British diplomat, administrator and Liberal Party official
- David Normington, the First Civil Service Commissioner and Commissioner for Public Appointments for the British government
- Grant Normington (born 1990), English footballer who is currently playing for Non-League side Hall Road Rangers
- John Normington (1937–2007), English actor who appeared widely on British television from the 1960s until the year of his death
