= Ashley Chambers =

English footballer (born 1990)

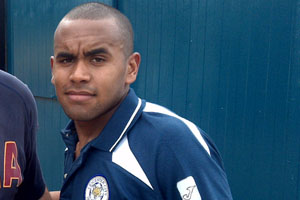
- Chambers in 2009

Personal information
- Full name: Ashley Renaldo Chambers
- Date of birth: 1 March 1990 (age 36)
- Place of birth: Leicester, England
- Height: 5 ft 10 in (1.78 m)
- Positions: Winger; striker

Team information
- Current team: Carlton Town

Youth career
- 1998–2005: Leicester City

Senior career*
Years	Team	Apps	(Gls)
2005–2011	Leicester City	6	(0)
2009	→ Wycombe Wanderers (loan)	3	(1)
2010	→ Grimsby Town (loan)	4	(2)
2010–2011	→ York City (loan)	26	(2)
2011–2014	York City	95	(19)
2014	Cambridge United	10	(1)
2014	→ Dagenham & Redbridge (loan)	6	(0)
2014–2016	Dagenham & Redbridge	63	(6)
2016–2017	Grimsby Town	16	(1)
2017	→ Nuneaton Town (loan)	15	(8)
2017–2018	Nuneaton Town	42	(20)
2018–2020	Kidderminster Harriers	72	(27)
2020–2021	Brackley Town	8	(0)
2021–2022	Buxton	36	(9)
2022–2024	Coalville Town	67	(19)
2024–2025	Basford United	24	(11)
2025	Barwell	13	(6)
2025–	Carlton Town	19	(13)

International career
2005–2006	England U16	7	(3)
2005–2007	England U17	13	(7)
2007–2008	England U18	2	(0)
2009	England U19	1	(0)
2011–2012	England C	2	(0)
- * Club domestic league appearances and goals as of 09:53, 27 May 2024 (UTC)

Ashley Renaldo Chambers (born 1 March 1990) is an English professional footballer who plays as a winger or a striker for Northern Premier League Division One Midlands club Carlton Town.

Chambers started his career with Leicester City, making his first-team debut in 2005 at the age of 15 in a League Cup match against Blackpool, which made him the youngest player in the club's history. In 2009, he joined League One club Wycombe Wanderers on loan. This was followed by a loan period with League Two club Grimsby Town. He signed for Conference Premier club York City on loan in November 2010 before signing permanently. He won in the 2012 FA Trophy Final and 2012 Conference Premier play-off final with York at Wembley Stadium, the latter seeing the club promoted into League Two. Chambers joined Conference Premier club Cambridge United in 2014.

== Club career ==
=== Leicester City ===
Born in Leicester, Leicestershire, Chambers joined the youth system of hometown club Leicester City aged eight. After playing for the Leicester under-18 team he made his reserve-team debut in March 2005. He became the club's youngest ever first-team player at the age of 15 years and 203 days after making his debut as a substitute in a League Cup second round win over Blackpool on 20 September 2005. He made his league debut against Cardiff City on 26 November 2007. Chambers signed a new contract with Leicester in November 2008, which contracted him to the club until June 2011.

On 21 August, Chambers joined League One club Wycombe Wanderers on loan until 2 January 2010. He returned to Leicester on 16 November. He signed for League Two club Grimsby Town on 22 January 2010 on loan for the remainder of the 2009–10 season. He made his debut in the away defeat against Rotherham United a few days later. After making his debut, Chambers fell out of contention at Blundell Park with manager Neil Woods bolstering his squad with the signings of fellow forwards Lee Peacock and Tommy Wright. He failed to make another appearance until 20 March when he came off the bench late on to and score a 91st-minute winner in a 3–2 win against AFC Bournemouth. The following week Chambers was given a go from the start, and scored again, this time with Grimsby being defeated 4–1 at Rochdale.

On 11 August 2010, Chambers scored two goals to help Leicester reserves win the Combination Challenge Cup following a 2–1 win over Oldham Athletic reserves at Quorn. He had a trial with League One club Bournemouth in September 2010 and impressed in a reserve match against Plymouth Argyle.

=== York City ===
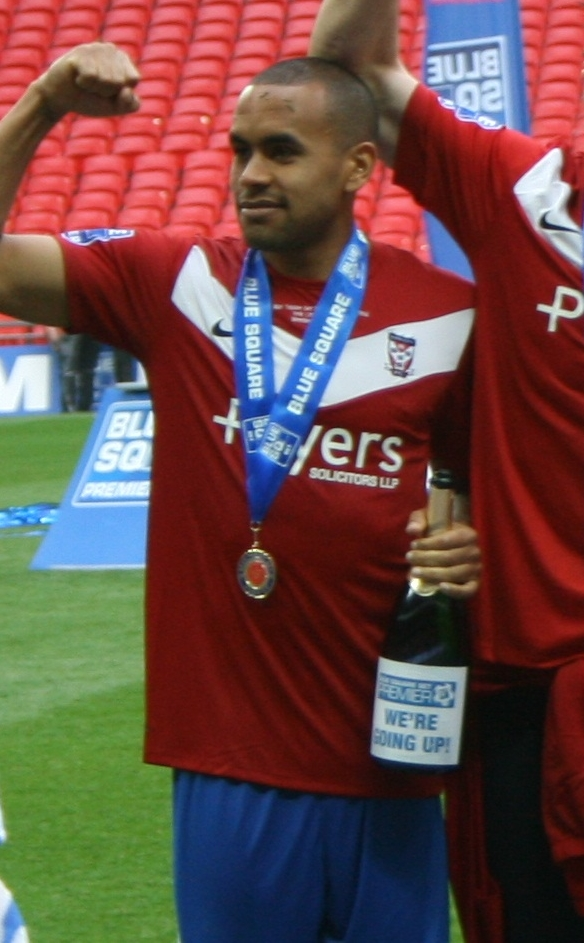
Chambers after playing for York City in the 2012 Conference Premier play-off final

On 12 November 2010, Chambers joined Conference Premier club York City on loan until January 2011. He made his debut in a 1–1 draw at home to Wrexham on 14 November 2010, scoring his first goal in a 4–0 victory away to Rushden & Diamonds on 20 November. Michael Rankine flicked the ball onto Chambers for a clear run on goal before he chipped the ball over the advancing goalkeeper. On 5 January 2011, his loan was extended until the end of 2010–11. The loan finished with 29 appearances and three goals. He was released by Leicester on 21 May 2011.

Chambers signed for York permanently on 25 May 2011 on a one-year contract, becoming the club's first signing of the summer transfer window. His first appearance of 2011–12 came in the opener, a 2–1 victory away to Ebbsfleet United on 13 August, and having started York's first nine matches he scored his first goal of the season in a 3–0 victory away to Wrexham on 17 September. Chambers won the 2012 FA Trophy Final with York at Wembley Stadium on 12 May, in which the team beat Newport County 2–0. Eight days later he scored York's opening goal with a rising 12 yard shot from Chris Smith's cross in the 2–1 victory over Luton in the 2012 Conference Premier play-off final at Wembley Stadium, which saw the club return into the Football League after an eight-year absence with promotion into League Two. He finished his first full season at York with 10 goals in 51 appearances and signed a new one-year contract, which would be extended for a second year dependent on his number of starts, in June 2012.

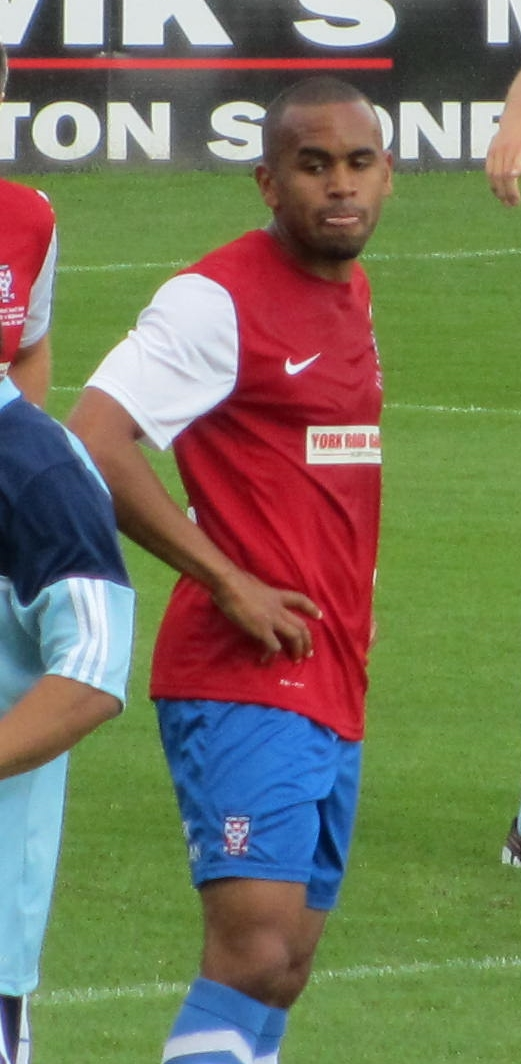
Chambers playing for York City in 2012

Chambers started for York away to League One team Doncaster Rovers in the League Cup first round in the opening match of 2012–13 on 11 August 2012, which the team lost 4–2 in a penalty shoot-out following a 1–1 draw after extra time. He then played in York's first Football League fixture since their promotion, a 3–1 defeat at home to Wycombe Wanderers on 18 August 2012. His first goal of the season came three days later with an 86th-minute equaliser in a 2–2 draw away to Morecambe. Chambers finished the season as York's top scorer with 10 goals in 42 appearances.

=== Cambridge United ===
After being made available on a free transfer, Chambers signed for Conference Premier club Cambridge United on 9 January 2014 on a contract for the remainder of 2013–14, with the option of another year. Two days later he scored the equaliser on his debut against Luton Town in the FA Trophy.

Chambers joined League Two club Dagenham & Redbridge on 7 March 2014 on a one-month emergency loan. He made his debut as a half-time substitute for Luke Howell in a 2–2 away draw with Exeter City on 8 March 2014 before being recalled by Cambridge United on 4 April, before his loan was due to end. He had made six appearances while on loan with Dagenham.

Chambers was on the bench as Cambridge beat Gateshead 2–1 in the 2014 Conference Premier play-off final at Wembley to win promotion to League Two, ending a nine-year stay out of the Football League. He had made 14 appearances and scored three goals for Cambridge in 2013–14 before being made available on a free transfer.

=== Dagenham & Redbridge ===
Chambers signed for Dagenham & Redbridge permanently on 19 June 2014 on a two-year contract. In May 2016, he was released along with eleven players as Dagenham were relegated into the National League.

=== Grimsby Town ===
Chambers signed a one-year contract with newly promoted League Two club Grimsby Town on 21 June 2016 on a free transfer.

On 8 February 2017, he joined National League North club Nuneaton Town on loan until the end of 2016–17. After making 19 appearances and scoring one goal for Grimsby in 2016–17, he was released by the club.

=== Later career ===
On 15 May 2017, Chambers joined Nuneaton Town permanently on a two-year contract.

Chambers signed for Nuneaton's National League North rivals Kidderminster Harriers on 12 June 2018 on a two-year contract.

In August 2020, Chambers signed for Brackley Town

In July 2021, he dropped down a division to sign for Northern Premier League Premier Division side Buxton on a free transfer.

=== Coalville Town ===
In July 2022, Chambers signed a one-year deal with top Leicestershire non-league side Coalville Town for the 2022/23 Southern League Premier Division Central season. Chambers played a crucial role in Coalville's run to the 1st round of the FA Cup, scoring 6 goals in 6 games, including a goal in the away win at National League side Notts County, and becoming the first player in Coalville's history to score in the FA Cup proper in the 1st round tie at Charlton Athletic.

Chambers scored the equaliser for Coalville in their 1–1 draw with Royston Town on December 3, 2022. The goal marked Chambers' 20th goal in all competitions for 2022/23 season and is only the second time he has reached that milestone in his career. On February 4, 2023, Chambers celebrated his 500th competitive career appearance and 12th goal of the season with a stylish finish into the top corner against A.F.C. Rushden & Diamonds.

=== Basford United ===
On 26 May 2024, Chambers joined Basford United.

=== Barwell ===
In February 2025, Chambers joined Southern League Premier Division Central club Barwell.

=== Carlton Town ===
In June 2025, Chambers joined Northern Premier League Division One Midlands side Carlton Town. He made a flying start to the season, scoring 13 in his first 19 games.

== International career ==
Chambers made his debut for the England national under-16 team against Wales in the 2005 Victory Shield on 14 October 2005, scoring the third goal in a 4–0 victory. His seventh and last cap at this level came against Japan in a 1–1 draw on 17 April 2006, having scored three goals for the team. His first international appearance for England came for the under-17s against Finland as a 62nd-minute substitute on 2 August 2005 in the 2005 Nordic Tournament. The following day Chambers scored a hat-trick against the Faroe Islands in a 7–0 victory on his full debut. He was named in the under-17 squad for the 2007 FIFA U-17 World Cup in August 2007. Chambers was on the bench for England's opening Group B match against North Korea but started the following match against New Zealand, scoring the final goal in the 88th minute of a 5–0 victory. He was limited to the bench for the final group match against Brazil but entered the Round of 16 3–1 win over Syria as a 90th-minute substitute. After entering England's quarter-final 4–1 defeat to Germany as a 58th-minute substitute he was sent off in the 88th minute for a rash tackle. This was his last appearance at under-17 level, for whom he played 13 matches and scored seven goals.

Chambers then represented the under-18 team, making his debut against Ghana on 20 November after entering the match as a 72nd-minute substitute, having been called into the squad as a replacement for Victor Moses. He earned his second and final cap for the under-18s against Austria as a 71st-minute substitute in a 2–0 victory on 16 April 2008. He made his only appearance for the under-19 team as a 78th-minute substitute in a 3–0 defeat to Spain at Dean Court in a friendly on 10 February 2009.

Chambers was called up by the England C team, who represent England at non-League level, in November 2011 for a friendly away to Gibraltar. He made his debut in this match, played on 15 November 2011, as a half-time substitute, with England losing 3–1. Chambers made his second appearance in England's 2011–13 International Challenge Trophy 1–1 draw at home to Italy on 28 February 2012, entering the match as a 69th-minute substitute. Following the end of 2011–12, he was called up for England C's match away to Russia on 5 June, but was forced to withdraw from the squad through injury. He finished his England C career with two caps from 2011 to 2012.

== Style of play ==
Chambers primarily plays as a striker, describing himself as "a striker that likes to run in behind defences off a big striker", but is also able to play as a winger.

== Career statistics ==
As of end of 2024–25 season

Appearances and goals by club, season and competition
Club	Season	League			FA Cup		League Cup		Other		Total	
Club	Season	Division	Apps	Goals	Apps	Goals	Apps	Goals	Apps	Goals	Apps	Goals
Leicester City	2005–06	Championship	0	0	0	0	1	0	—		1	0
Leicester City	2006–07	Championship	0	0	0	0	0	0	—		0	0
Leicester City	2007–08	Championship	5	0	0	0	0	0	—		5	0
Leicester City	2008–09	League One	1	0	1	0	0	0	1 (Note: Appearance(s) in Football League Trophy)	0	3	0
Leicester City	2009–10	Championship	0	0	0	0	0	0	0	0	0	0
Leicester City	2010–11	Championship	0	0	0	0	0	0	—		0	0
Leicester City	Total		6	0	1	0	1	0	1	0	9	0
Wycombe Wanderers (loan)	2009–10	League One	3	1	—		—		1	0	4	1
Grimsby Town (loan)	2009–10	League Two	4	2	—		—		—		4	2
York City (loan)	2010–11	Conference Premier	26	2	2	1	—		1 (Note: Appearance(s) in FA Trophy)	0	29	3
York City	2011–12	Conference Premier	42	9	1	0	—		8 (Note: Five appearances in FA Trophy, three appearances and one goal in Conference Premier play-offs)	1	51	10
York City	2012–13	League Two	38	10	2	0	1	0	1	0	42	10
York City	2013–14	League Two	15	0	1	0	1	0	1	0	18	0
York City	Total		121	21	6	1	2	0	11	1	140	23
Cambridge United	2013–14	Conference Premier	10	1	—		—		4 (Note: Three appearances and two goals in FA Trophy, one appearance in Conference Premier play-offs)	2	14	3
Dagenham & Redbridge (loan)	2013–14	League Two	6	0	—		—		—		6	0
Dagenham & Redbridge	2014–15	League Two	32	2	2	0	1	1	1	0	36	3
Dagenham & Redbridge	2015–16	League Two	31	4	4	0	1	0	3	1	39	5
Dagenham & Redbridge	Total		69	6	6	0	2	1	4	1	81	8
Grimsby Town	2016–17	League Two	16	1	0	0	1	0	2 (Note: Appearances in EFL Trophy)	0	19	1
Nuneaton Town (loan)	2016–17	National League North	15	8	—		—		—		15	8
Nuneaton Town	2017–18	National League North	42	20	2	3	—		2	2	46	25
Nuneaton Town	Total		57	28	2	3	—		2	2	61	33
Kidderminster Harriers	2018–19	National League North	42	14	1	0	—		1	0	44	14
Kidderminster Harriers	2019–20	National League North	30	13	2	0	—		1	0	33	13
Kidderminster Harriers	Total		72	27	3	0	—		2	0	77	27
Brackley Town	2020–21	National League North	8	0	3	0	—		2	2	13	2
Buxton	2021–22	NPL Premier Division	36	9	7	4	—		1	1	44	14
Coalville Town	2022–23	Southern League Premier Division Central	41	16	6	6	—		5	6	52	28
Coalville Town	2023–24	Southern League Premier Division Central	27	3	2	0	—		6 (Note: Five appearances and two goals in FA Trophy, one appearance in Leicestershire and Rutland Senior Cup)	2	35	5
Coalville Town	Total		68	19	8	6	0	0	11	8	87	33
Basford United	2024–25	NPL Premier Division	24	11	2	1	—		4	0	30	12
Barwell	2024–25	Southern League Premier Division Central	13	6	0	0	—		0	0	13	6
Career total			500	131	38	15	6	1	44	15	588	164

== Honours ==
York City

- Conference Premier play-offs: 2011–12
- FA Trophy: 2011–12

Cambridge United

- Conference Premier play-offs: 2013–14
