= Michael Leary =

English footballer (born 1983)

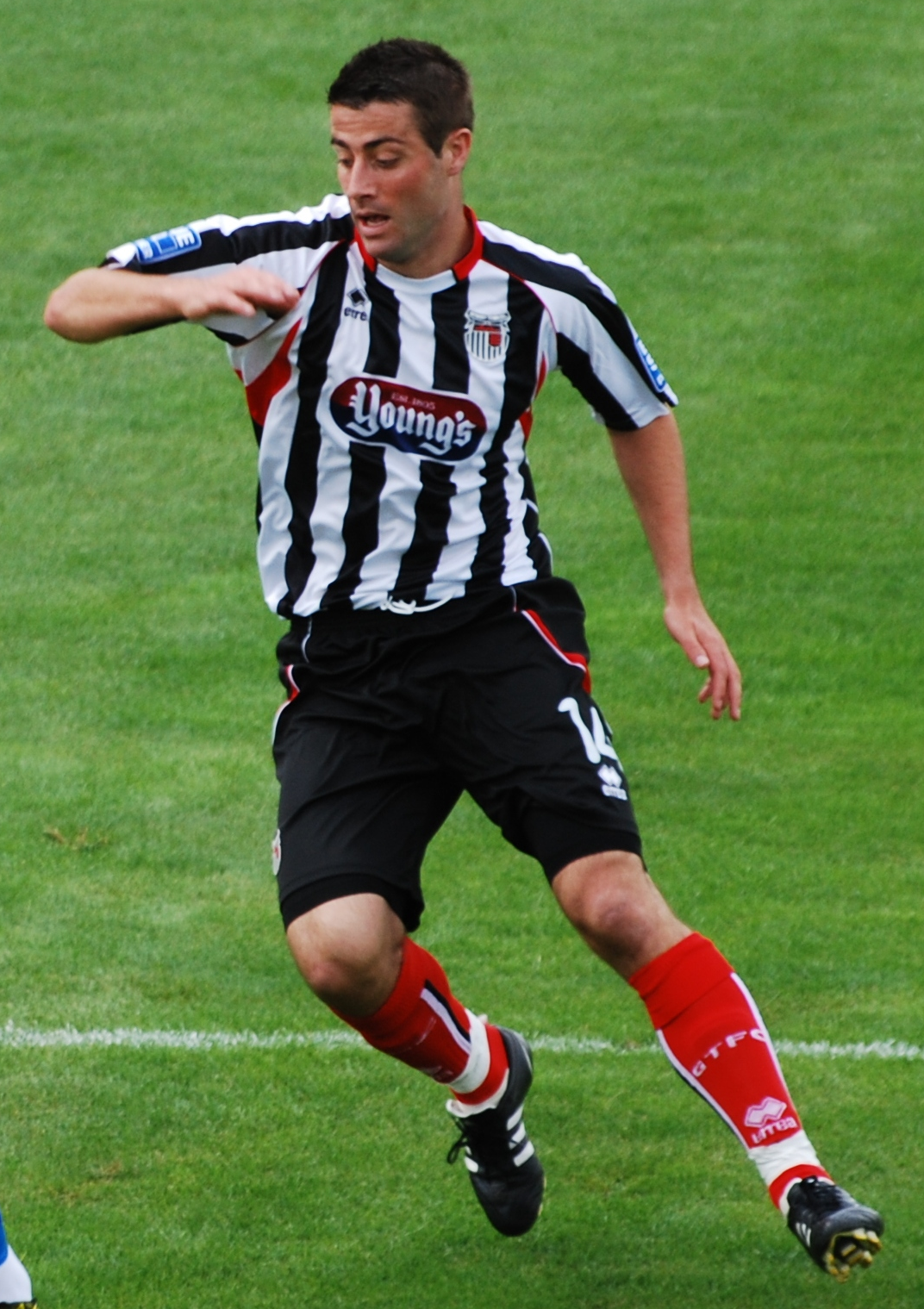
- Leary playing for Grimsby Town in 2010

Personal information
- Full name: Michael Antonio Leary
- Date of birth: 17 April 1983 (age 43)
- Place of birth: Ealing, London, England
- Height: 5 ft 11 in (1.80 m)
- Position: Midfielder

Youth career
- ?–2002: Luton Town

Senior career*
Years	Team	Apps	(Gls)
2002–2007	Luton Town	22	(2)
2005	→ Bristol Rovers (loan)	13	(0)
2006	→ Walsall (loan)	15	(1)
2006	→ Torquay United (loan)	2	(0)
2007	→ Brentford (loan)	17	(0)
2007–2009	Barnet	50	(3)
2009–2011	Grimsby Town	48	(1)
2011–2014	Gainsborough Trinity	107	(12)
2014–2016	Spalding United	47	(7)
Total		321	(26)
- * Club domestic league appearances and goals as of 22:53, 27 January 2012 (UTC)

Michael Antonio Leary (born 17 April 1983) is an English former professional footballer who played as a midfielder.

He played for Luton Town, Bristol Rovers, Walsall, Torquay United, Brentford, Barnet, Grimsby Town, Gainsborough Trinity and Spalding United.

== Career ==
=== Luton Town ===
Born in Ealing, London, Leary began his career as a trainee with Luton Town, turning professional on 3 August 2001. He played in two Football League Trophy games the following season and in May 2003 was handed a new two-year contract. He made his league debut on 20 September 2003 in a 1–1 draw at home to Queens Park Rangers. In August 2005 he joined Bristol Rovers on loan initially for a month. This was extended for another month after some decent performances and then until the end of the year. In January 2006 he joined Walsall on loan until the end of the season. This meant that for most of the 2005–06 season he was a Luton player but not at the club. In the summer of 2006 Leary signed a contract extension of one year for Luton. In November 2006 Leary joined Torquay United on loan, making his debut as a substitute in the 1–0 defeat away to Walsall on 4 November 2006. Leary signed for Brentford on a one-month loan deal on 4 January 2007. This was extended to the end of the season on 31 January after doing well for Brentford during his initial deal.

=== Barnet ===
In May 2007, Luton released Leary on a free transfer. He signed for Barnet on 3 July, spending two years at the club. During his time he was also used as a centre back and put in some creditable performances in this position. Despite this he was released in the summer of 2009.

=== Grimsby Town ===
His next port of call was to join his former manager Mike Newell at League Two side Grimsby Town in July on a two-year contract. Leary was in and out of the team on a regular basis, but had lost his way in the ranks under the new management of Neil Woods. Grimsby were relegated at the end of the season to the Conference National. During Grimsby's debut Conference season Leary served the side as a bit part player. He was eventually released by Grimsby's new managerial duo Rob Scott and Paul Hurst after the conclusion of the 2010–11 season.

=== Gainsborough Trinity ===
On 8 July Leary joined Conference North side Gainsborough Trinity on trial. On 18 July he played for Gainsborough in their 8–0 friendly victory over Brigg Town, and the following day he played for Boston United in their 2–2 draw with Stamford. On 21 July he signed for Gainsborough on a one-year contract. Leary signed for another year following the completion of the 2011–2012 season.

During the 2012–13 season Leary became club captain and nearly helped The Blues reach the final of the FA Trophy, but despite beating Conference National side Wrexham 2–1 in the semi-final second leg at home (with Leary scoring the winner), the club went out 4–3 on aggregate. Leary was expected to sign for a cash rich and recently promoted North Ferriby United in May 2013 along with teammates Daniel Hone, Jonathan D'Laryea and Jamie Yates, but instead did a U-turn and signed a fresh one-year contract with The Blues on 4 June 2013.

=== Spalding United ===
In July 2014, Leary signed a deal with Spalding United.
