= Chris Jones (footballer, born 1989) =

Welsh footballer

Personal information
- Date of birth: 12 September 1989 (age 37)
- Place of birth: Swansea, Wales
- Position: Winger

Team information
- Current team: Goytre United

Youth career
- Swansea City

Senior career*
| Years | Team | Apps | (Gls) |
| 2006–2009 | Swansea City | 7 | (0) |
| 2008 | → Cambridge United (loan) | 8 | (0) |
| 2009–2010 | Grimsby Town | 7 | (1) |
| 2010 | → Neath (loan) | 16 | (5) |
| 2010–2012 | Neath | 55 | (11) |
| 2012–2014 | The New Saints | 65 | (8) |
| 2014–2015 | Gloucester City | 15 | (1) |
| 2015–2016 | Port Talbot Town | 12 | (0) |
| 2016 | Thunder Bay Chill | 14 | (3) |
| 2016–2017 | Aberystwyth Town | | |
| 2017 | Afan Lido | | |
| 2017–2019 | Llanelli Town | | |
| 2019–2020 | Carmarthen Town | | |
| 2020–2025 | Afan Lido | | |
| 2025– | Goytre United | | |

International career^{‡}
| 2005–2007 | Wales U17 | 10 | (2) |
| 2006–2008 | Wales U19 | 11 | (2) |
| 2006–2007 | Wales U21 | 1 | (0) |
| 2010–2012 | Wales Semi-Pro | 4 | (1) |
- * Club domestic league appearances and goals as of 23:09, 12 March 2011 (UTC) ‡ National team caps and goals as of 23:06, 12 March 2011 (UTC)

Chris Jones (born 12 September 1989) is a Welsh footballer who plays as a winger for Goytre United.

He has previously played for Swansea City, Cambridge United, Grimsby Town, Neath, The New Saints and Gloucester City.

== Career ==
=== Swansea City ===
Born in Swansea, Jones progressed through the Swansea City youth ranks and signed his first professional contract in 2006 lasting two and a half years and made his senior debut for the club against Walsall in the Football League Trophy in 2006. In July 2007 he trained with Hamilton Academical with a view to joining them on a season-long loan deal but he was recalled by Swansea to join up with the first team in preparation for the new season.

Jones has played for Wales at various youth levels and is currently mainly playing for the under-19 team. However, he was called up to the under-21 squad in February 2007 coming on as a substitute against Northern Ireland.

Jones spent the first three months of the 2008/09 season on loan at Conference National side Cambridge United. He returned to Swansea on 18 November 2008.

=== Grimsby Town ===
On 1 July 2009, Jones joined Grimsby Town on trial with a view to a permanent deal being struck. On 18 July, manager Mike Newell offered Jones a permanent contract with the club. Jones officially signed for Grimsby Town on 25 July 2009. After struggling to break into the first team, Jones was made available for loan under new manager Neil Woods, and in January 2010, Jones signed for Welsh Premier League side Neath on loan until the end of the 2009–10 season, scoring a hat trick on his debut in a 3–2 win over Porthmadog.

Following the conclusion of the Welsh football season, Jones returned to Grimsby and was ready for selection in Town's final two games of the season. Despite this he was not picked and on 12 May 2010, Jones was one of seven players placed on the transfer list by Neil Woods following their relegation from the Football League. After failing in his task to find a new club in the summer of 2010, Jones was kept on at Grimsby and was handed a squad number for the upcoming 2010–2011 campaign. On 30 July 2010 Jones had his contract cancelled by mutual consent.

=== Neath ===
Following his departure, Jones returned to Neath on a permanent deal on 5 August 2010.

After playing as a striker during his loan spell, Jones has been converted to a right winger for the 2010–11 season and has provided many assists as well as chipping in with several goals as well as Neath go in search of European football. At the end of the 2010–11 season Jones won the Welsh Premier League Young Player of the Year Award. Jones was also Picked in the Welsh Premier League Dream Team in 2010–11 and 2011–12. Jones left Neath in May 2012 when the club folded.

=== The New Saints ===
Jones joined Newport County on trial on 5 July 2012. He however signed for The New Saints the following week. After two years with the club, and with his contract with the Saints about to expire, he was again keen to join Newport and went on trial with them again in the summer of 2014.

=== Gloucester City ===
On 31 July 2014, Jones joined Gloucester City on a short-term deal.

=== Port Talbot Town ===
In January 2015, Jones joined Port Talbot Town.

=== Thunder Bay Chill ===
He then joined Canadian team Thunder Bay Chill in May 2016, scoring three goals in 14 league matches, also appearing in one playoff match.

=== Aberystwyth Town ===
In August 2016 he joined Aberystwyth Town.

=== Afan Lido ===
In March 2017 he joined Afan Lido.

=== Llanelli Town ===
In July 2017 he joined Llanelli Town.

=== Carmarthen Town ===
In May 2019 he joined Carmarthen Town.

=== Afan Lido (second time) ===
In January 2020 he re-joined Afan Lido.

=== Goytre United ===
In July 2025 he joined Goytre United.

== Honours ==
Individual

- Welsh Premier League Young Player of the Season: 2010–11
- Welsh Premier League Team of the Year: 2010–11, 2011–12, 2013–14
