= Adrian Clarke (footballer) =

English footballer and sports journalist

Personal information
- Full name: Adrian James Clarke
- Date of birth: 28 September 1974 (age 52)
- Place of birth: Cambridge, England
- Height: 5 ft 10 in (1.78 m)
- Position: Midfielder

Youth career
- Arsenal

Senior career*
Years	Team	Apps	(Gls)
1991–1997	Arsenal	9	(0)
1996–1997	→ Rotherham United (loan)	2	(0)
1997	→ Southend United (loan)	7	(0)
1997–2000	Southend United	86	(9)
1999	→ Carlisle United (loan)	7	(0)
2000–2002	Stevenage Borough	85	(19)
2002	→ Hendon (loan)	4	(0)
2002–2005	Margate	97	(11)
2005–2006	Welling United	38	(6)
Total		335	(45)
- * Club domestic league appearances and goals

Adrian James Clarke (born 28 September 1974) is an English former professional footballer. He played at every level of English football from the Premier League to the Conference South.

A midfielder, Clarke made nine first team appearances for Arsenal including five starts and also represented Southend United, Stevenage, Margate and, Welling United. He also played for England Schoolboys and the England Under-18s.

After retiring in 2005 he became a sports journalist and broadcaster. He is a presenter, match analyst and co-commentator for Arsenal Player, a pundit for BT Sport and Premier League Productions, and can also be heard regularly on Talksport and BBC Radio Essex.

== Career ==
Born in Cambridge, England, Clarke started his career at Arsenal. He played a total of nine league games for the first team, making his league debut on New Year's Eve 1994 as a substitute in a 3–1 defeat to Queens Park Rangers at Highbury, and his first start on 26 December 1995 in a 3–0 win at home to QPR. He had loan spells at Rotherham United and Southend United in 1996–97 before he signed for Southend on a free transfer in August 1997. He played 75 league games for Southend, scoring his first career goal in a 3–1 victory over Brentford on 5 September 1997.

Clarke joined Cumbrian side Carlisle United on loan in September 1999 before returning to Essex. He left Southend at the end of the 1999–2000 season and joined Stevenage Borough on a free transfer. In less than two seasons he played 85 games, scoring 19 goals, before another loan spell at Hendon. He spent just a month at Hendon but was signed by Margate on a free transfer at the end of his loan spell.

Clarke played 97 games for Margate, captaining the team a number of times and scoring 11 goals, before joining Welling United. He was forced to retire with a serious pelvic injury.

== Post-football ==
After he retired, Clarke pursued media studies, landing a job at the Southend Evening Echo as a journalist. He worked as deputy editor of icons.com, a football editorial and signed memorabilia website, and also wrote several feature articles for UEFA.com and FourFourTwo.

As of 2008, Clarke was a presenter, match analyst and co-commentator on Arsenal's official online television channel. A regular guest on Talksport, Clarke also co-commentates for BBC Radio Essex and writes for several other major media clients around the world.
