= Barry Conlon =

Irish former professional footballer

Personal information
- Full name: Barry John Conlon
- Date of birth: 1 October 1978 (age 48)
- Place of birth: Drogheda, Ireland
- Height: 1.91 m (6 ft 3 in)
- Position: Striker

Youth career
- Carrick Rovers
- Stella Maris
- Dundalk

Senior career*
Years	Team	Apps	(Gls)
1996–1997	Queens Park Rangers	0	(0)
1997–1998	Manchester City	7	(0)
1998	→ Plymouth Argyle (loan)	13	(2)
1998–1999	Southend United	34	(7)
1999–2001	York City	48	(11)
2001	→ Colchester United (loan)	26	(8)
2001–2004	Darlington	115	(39)
2004–2006	Barnsley	35	(7)
2006	→ Rotherham United (loan)	3	(1)
2006–2007	Darlington	19	(6)
2007	Mansfield Town	17	(6)
2007–2009	Bradford City	72	(17)
2009	→ Grimsby Town (loan)	8	(5)
2009–2010	Grimsby Town	16	(5)
2010	→ Chesterfield (loan)	4	(1)
2010	Chesterfield	15	(6)
2010	Stockport County	9	(0)
2011	R.O.C. de Charleroi-Marchienne	2	(0)
2012	Dundalk	6	(1)
2013	Carrick Rovers	2	(1)
Total		451	(123)

International career
1998–1999	Republic of Ireland U21	7	(0)

Managerial career
- 2019–: LMFC Blue Jaguars
- * Club domestic league appearances and goals

Barry John Conlon (born 1 October 1978) is an Irish former professional footballer and Head Coach of New York-based LMFC Blue Jaguars

As a player he was a striker from 1996 to 2013. Conlon's career started with Queens Park Rangers but he moved to Manchester City before he had played a game. He made his Football League debut with City. He subsequently went on to play for Southend United, York City, Darlington on two separate occasions, Barnsley, Mansfield Town, Bradford City, Grimsby Town, Chesterfield, Stockport County, R.O.C. de Charleroi-Marchienne and Dundalk. He has also had a number of other loan spells with other Football League sides and has represented his country at under-21 level in seven games.

== Early life ==
Conlon was the youngest of six sons to Noel and Kitty. Born in Drogheda, County Louth, Conlon grew up in Carrickmacross, County Monaghan where he played football with local team Carrickmacross Rovers from the age of eight to 14. He also represented the North Eastern Counties Schoolboys League at the Kennedy Cup in Limerick. During the tournament Conlon impressed scouts from top schoolboy club Stella Maris and signed for the Dublin outfit in time for the prestigious Milk Cup held in Coleraine that summer. He remained in Dublin for one season before returning to the north-east to sign for Dundalk. At the end of his first season at Oriel Park, Conlon re-signed for Carrick Rovers before attracting the interest of English clubs.

== Playing career ==
=== Queens Park Rangers ===
He started his professional career with Queens Park Rangers (QPR), signing his first contract on 1 August 1996. This was a couple of months after Rangers had lost their FA Premier League status. Conlon was added to the Loftus Road squad for their first season back in the First Division. However, after his first year at QPR he was released. He failed to make an appearance for the club's first team.

=== Manchester City ===
Conlon was signed by Manchester City, who had suffered relegation with QPR in 1996. Shortly after signing Conlon played for the Republic of Ireland national under-19 football team in the 1997 UEFA European Under-18 Football Championship finals in Iceland. He scored and got sent off against Switzerland. He made his debut for the club on 27 September 1997, replacing Georgi Kinkladze as a late substitute against Swindon Town, but appearances were limited to just one league start and seven substitute appearances. Subsequently, he was loaned out 18 months later to Plymouth Argyle, spending the next six months at the club, scoring two goals in 13 games. He was released by City at the end of his contract.

=== Southend United and York City ===
He next port of call was to sign for Southend United a month into the 1998–99 season. Conlon made over 30 appearances for the club, scoring seven goalsin all competitions, but Conlon left no more than 10 months after joining the Roots Hall club. York City signed Conlon for a fee of £100,000, and he went on to play a pivotal role in the City side during the 1999–2000 season. In November 2000, he fell out of favour at Bootham Crescent, thus allowing him to join Colchester United on loan, but after playing the 2000–01 season for United, the club decided to not give him a permanent deal.

=== Darlington ===
York cashed in on Conlon and sold him to rivals Darlington in July 2001 for a reported five-figure fee. Conlon's first season at the club was not as successful as he hoped, but in his three seasons at Feethams, he was loved by some fans who heralded him as a hero, after playing a huge part in keeping Darlo in the Football League. In his last season at the club, he scored 14 goals, leading to interest from higher-league clubs.

=== Barnsley and return to Darlington ===
Following the end of his contract at Darlington, Conlon was free to leave, and he signed for Barnsley. Conlon struggled to find the net at Barnsley, and eventually lost his place in the side to players such as Rory Fallon and Michael Boulding. He was loaned to Rotherham United towards the end of the 2005–06 season. He left Barnsley at the end of that season, he made just under 40 appearances for the club in the two seasons, scoring seven times. Conlon made a surprise return to Darlington at the start of 2006–07. On his return to Darlington, he scored a hat-trick on his debut, but later lost his place in the team following Dave Penney's appointment as manager. In January 2007 he left the club for a second time.

=== Mansfield Town ===
Conlon was allowed to sign for Mansfield Town on a free transfer along with Lincoln City striker Martin Gritton. He played 17 games for the club, scoring six times, but was released by the club four months later.

=== Bradford City ===
Conlon joined newly relegated League Two side Bradford City on a one-year contract, becoming new manager Stuart McCall's first signing, along with fellow striker Peter Thorne. His debut came on the first day of the 2007–08 season against Macclesfield Town when he saw a penalty kick saved and the rebound scored by Guylain Ndumbu-Nsungu to secure a 1–1 draw. He scored his first goal for the club in his 10th game, converting a last-minute penalty at Milton Keynes Dons on 6 October 2007 in a 2–1 defeat. After missing a number of chances in a game against Brentford later in October, he came in for criticism from the fans and was dropped from the Bradford starting side for more than a month. However, he turned down two loan moves away from Bradford and scored his first goal from open play to seal a late 2–1 victory over Lincoln City on Boxing Day 2007. Conlon scored two more penalties before being relieved of penalty duties after missing a vital kick in a 2–0 defeat to Dagenham & Redbridge on 1 March 2008. Later that month he scored in successive games for the first time for City including one against former side Mansfield. He ended the month with another goal against a former side, this time Darlington, in a 3–1 win at the Darlington Arena; he also conceded a penalty. Conlon earned a new six-month contract, which he signed at the end of the season keeping him at Bradford City until January 2009.

He was largely used as a substitute at the start of the 2008–09 season, but scored his first goal of the campaign during a start against Leeds United in the Football League Trophy, as Bradford lost 2–1. His first league goal of the season came just minutes after coming on as a substitute against Luton Town, to help Bradford gain a point with ten men. Having scored two more goals, Conlon was rewarded with a rare start against Barnet, when he scored two goals but City could only draw 3–3. Conlon scored his 100th league goal from the penalty spot on 25 November 2008, the winning goal as Bradford City beat Chesterfield at Valley Parade. He marked the occasion by removing his shirt, revealing a vest with '100' emblazoned across the front, for which he was shown a yellow card. Conlon extended his stay at Bradford for another six months in December 2008. In March 2009, Conlon and defender Matthew Clarke were both dropped for a game with Exeter City and punished following a breach of club discipline. Manager Stuart McCall said: "It's an internal matter and has been dealt with in the dressing room." Conlon was recalled to the side but made one only more appearance before he was sent on loan.

=== Grimsby Town ===
Conlon signed for fellow League Two club Grimsby Town on loan for the rest of the 2008–09 season. He joined the club on the transfer deadline day along with Peter Sweeney and Jonathan Lund. He scored the final goal of a 3–0 win against Gillingham on his debut to help lift Grimsby out of the League Two relegation zone. He scored a penalty in his second game to give Grimsby a 1–0 victory against Aldershot Town and lift them three points clear of the relegation zone. Conlon proved to be an integral part of the Grimsby team that avoided relegation from The Football League. Having partnered forwards Jean-Louis Akpa Akpro and Adam Proudlock up front, Conlon scored five times in eight appearances to help seal Grimsby's league status.

Following the conclusion of the 2008–09 campaign, he was released by Bradford, and shortly afterwards he signed for Grimsby permanently on a two-year contract. Conlon's season began on a plus point, scoring on the opening day game with Cheltenham Town, but he soon lost his place in the first team due to two red cards in three games which left him suspended for seven matches, in which his team seemingly struggled too find an adequate replacement who could find the back of the net. Following the dismissal of manager Mike Newell, Conlon found himself out of favour with new manager Neil Woods often using him as a substitute. He was also relegated to the reserves, and spent one night in a police station cell because of driving offences only hours before a reserve fixture with Scunthorpe United. On 13 January 2010, Woods told Conlon, along with Danny Boshell, Matthew Heywood and Jamie Clarke, that they were free to leave the club in the January transfer window. On 1 March 2010, over a month since Conlon's Grimsby departure, the club held a fans forum giving a chance for the supporters to voice recent club concerns with chairman John Fenty and manager Neil Woods. Conlon's release to Chesterfield had been slightly criticised by some supporters because of the fact he was the Grimsby's current seasonal top goalscorer, and was seemingly the only proven goal scorer in the ranks at Blundell Park. Fenty was asked by a supporter during the forum why Conlon was allowed to leave. Fenty answered that Conlon had become a disruptive influence, having failed to turn up for training and not answered phone calls from the club. Conlon later admitted that after an enjoyable loan spell with Grimsby his "heart wasn't in it" when he signed permanently for the club and that his commuting from his Leeds home had left him exhausted. He also claimed that new manager Neil Woods was "clueless".

=== Chesterfield ===
By the end of the week, he signed for fellow League Two side Chesterfield initially on loan. Conlon scored on his Chesterfield debut to give them a 1–0 victory against Torquay United and lift his new side into the promotion play-off spots. On 23 January 2010, it was announced that prior to his move to Saltergate, Conlon was offered to Accrington Stanley as part of a six-figure deal to lure striker Michael Symes to Blundell Park. Stanley rejected the bid, meaning Conlon's move to Chesterfield went through.

On 1 February 2010, Conlon signed for Chesterfield on a permanent deal after his two-year contract with Grimsby was cancelled by mutual consent. Conlon, during his time at Saltergate, chipped in with six goals including a number of penalties. As a result of failing to qualify for the League Two play-offs, Chesterfield manager John Sheridan released Conlon, along with 11 other players, on 12 March 2010.

=== Stockport County ===
Conlon signed for League Two team Stockport County on 15 July 2010 following a trial. In November 2010, police saw Conlon speeding in his Mercedes. He was stopped and gave a positive drink-drive sample. The following month he was given a three-and-a-half-year driving ban after admitting drink-driving; he was also fined £1,175. Consequently, he was released by the club after having his contract cancelled by mutual consent on 21 December.

=== ROC de Charleroi-Marchienne ===
In March 2011 Conlon signed for Belgian Third Division B side R.O.C. de Charleroi-Marchienne. He left the club at the end of the 2010–11 season, and briefly joined Monaghan United on trial, but failed to earn a contract.

=== Dundalk and Carrick Rovers ===
In July 2012 he interested Dundalk, with the club hoping to sign him along with several other players, but soon after the deal was described as "dead in the water". On 30 August 2012 he was on the verge of signing for the club, and joined on non-contract terms making his debut in a practice friendly match. He signed until the end of the 2012 League of Ireland season, and made his League of Ireland debut on 7 September in Oriel Park and scored his only goal against Bray in October. At the end of the 2012 season, Conlon was one of many Dundalk players who weren't retained.

In March 2013 Conlon returned to Carrick Rovers, scoring in his debut against Woodview Celtic.

== Coaching career ==
As of May 2019, Conlon was head coach of Westchester County, New York-based junior soccer team the LMFC Blue Jaguars.

== Personal life ==
Conlon married Kim in 2016 and settled in Yonkers, New York.

== Career statistics ==
Appearances and goals by club, season and competition
Club	Season	League			National Cup (Note: Includes FA Cup, FAI Cup)		League Cup (Note: Includes Football League Cup, League of Ireland Cup)		Other		Total	
Club	Season	Division	Apps	Goals	Apps	Goals	Apps	Goals	Apps	Goals	Apps	Goals
Manchester City	1997–98	First Division	7	0	0	0	0	0	—		7	0
Manchester City	1998–99	Second Division	0	0	—		1	0	—		1	0
Manchester City	Total		7	0	0	0	1	0	—		8	0
Plymouth Argyle (loan)	1997–98	Second Division	13	2	—		—		—		13	2
Southend United	1998–99	Second Division	34	7	1	0	—		1 (Note: Appearance(s) in Football League Trophy)	0	36	7
York City	1999–2000	Third Division	40	11	1	0	2	0	1	0	44	11
York City	2000–01	Third Division	8	0	—		2	0	—		10	0
York City	Total		48	11	1	0	4	0	1	0	54	11
Colchester United (loan)	2000–01	Second Division	26	8	1	0	—		1	0	28	8
Darlington	2001–02	Third Division	35	10	1	1	1	0	1	0	38	11
Darlington	2002–03	Third Division	41	15	2	2	1	0	1	0	45	17
Darlington	2003–04	Third Division	39	14	1	0	2	0	0	0	42	14
Darlington	Total		115	39	4	3	4	0	2	0	125	42
Barnsley	2004–05	League One	24	6	1	0	2	1	1	0	28	7
Barnsley	2005–06	League One	11	1	0	0	2	0	—		13	1
Barnsley	Total		35	7	1	0	4	1	1	0	41	8
Rotherham United (loan)	2005–06	League One	3	1	—		—		1	0	4	1
Darlington	2006–07	League Two	19	6	2	0	0	0	2	0	23	6
Mansfield Town	2006–07	League Two	17	6	—		—		—		17	6
Bradford City	2007–08	League Two	42	7	2	0	1	0	1	0	46	7
Bradford City	2008–09	League Two	30	10	2	0	1	0	1	1	34	11
Bradford City	Total		72	17	4	0	2	0	2	1	80	18
Grimsby Town (loan)	2008–09	League Two	8	5	—		—		—		8	5
Grimsby Town	2009–10	League Two	16	5	1	0	1	0	1	0	19	5
Grimsby Town	Total		24	10	1	0	1	0	1	0	27	10
Chesterfield (loan)	2009–10	League Two	19	7	—		—		—		19	7
Stockport County	2010–11	League Two	9	0	1	0	1	0	0	0	11	0
Olympic Charleroi	2010–11	Belgian Third Division B	2	0	—		—		—		2	0
Dundalk	2012	League of Ireland; Premier Division	6	1	1	0	—		0	0	7	1
Career total			449	122	17	3	17	1	12	1	495	127
