= Grant Normington =

English footballer (born 1990)

Personal information
- Full name: Grant Normington
- Date of birth: 9 May 1990 (age 36)
- Place of birth: Hull, England
- Height: 5 ft 8 in (1.73 m)
- Position: Midfielder

Youth career
- ?–2008: Grimsby Town

Senior career*
Years	Team	Apps	(Gls)
2008–2010	Grimsby Town	1	(0)
2009	→ Frickley Athletic (loan)	6	(2)
2009–2010	→ Frickley Athletic (loan)	2	(1)
2010	Frickley Athletic	10	(4)
2010–2011	Hall Road Rangers	37	(6)
2014–	Chalk Lane		
- * Club domestic league appearances and goals as of 19:14, 17 February 2015 (UTC)

Grant Normington (born 9 May 1990) is an English former professional footballer who played as a midfielder from 2008 until 2011.

His natural position is on the right side of midfield, although he has been known to play as a right back. Normington played as a professional for Grimsby Town between 2008 and 2010. He went on to have spells with Frickley Athletic and Hall Road Rangers.

== Career ==
=== Grimsby Town ===
Grant began his career with Grimsby Town and was added to the first team squad during the 2007–08 season by Alan Buckley and was offered a new contract for the following season. He made his debut for the club under Mike Newell as he came on as a substitute for James Hunt in the 82nd minute of the club's 0–0 away draw with Exeter City. Normington was then given a new two-year contract on 28 November 2008 by the club after impressing since the arrival of the new manager.

In an interview to the Grimsby Telegraph on 9 December Normington commented at his relief at his chances under the new manager, stating that Alan Buckley failed to help him in his career.

"The feedback from the gaffer has been positive.

"When the old manager was here, he didn't talk to me as much and didn't help me out as much.

"Alan Buckley didn't really give me a chance - not even a sniff.

"I wasn't even on the bench sometimes - even when there were seven subs in the cup, he named just six.

"Since Mike Newell got here, he has been great with me.

"He helps me and tells me my chance will come and this contract backs that up."

On 23 October 2009 Normington joined Frickley Athletic on loan for one month. He re-joined Frickley for a second spell on 21 December 2009. On 28 January 2010 Normington had his contract cancelled by manager Neil Woods and subsequently was released by the club.

=== Non-league ===
On 8 February 2010 it was revealed that Normington had re-joined Frickley on a permanent deal until the end of the season. In October 2010 Normington signed for Hall Road Rangers. Normington left Rangers in 2011.

He made a return to football on 17 February 2015, in signing for Humber Premier League outfit Chalk Lane, after 4 years away from the game.

== Honours ==
=== Grimsby Town ===
- Football League Trophy runner up: 2007-08
