= Icons.com =

Online retailer of sports memorabilia

- Type: Private
- Industry: Memorabilia
- Founded: 1999
- Founder: James Freedman
- Headquarters: London, England, United Kingdom
- Area served: Worldwide
- Key people: Edward Freedman (Chairman); Daniel Jamieson (CEO)
- Parent: Icons Shop Limited
- Website: www.icons.com

Icons.com is an online retailer of authentic signed sports memorabilia based in London and Christchurch. The website was launched in 1999 initially as the leading portal for the personal websites of the world's top footballers. Since late 2008, it has sold merchandise and memorabilia signed by the likes of Lionel Messi, Cristiano Ronaldo, Diego Maradona, Pelé, Neymar, Ronaldo, Andrés Iniesta, Ronaldinho, Luka Modrić, João Félix, Son Heung-min and many others.

In 2010, Icons Shop Limited was awarded the world's first football memorabilia licence by FIFA. It allowed the website to produce a range of official 2010 FIFA World Cup products. Since then, Icons.com has sold official memorabilia for all other iterations of the FIFA World Cup as well as the UEFA Champions League, UEFA Europa League, UEFA European Championship, the Football Association and Lionel Messi.

In June 2015, Icons Shop Limited sold a majority stake in the company to Marka PJSC and used the investment to purchase the assets of rival business A1 Sporting Memorabilia, thus becoming the world's largest football memorabilia company.

== History ==
Founded by James Freedman, Icons.com was initially a football website that provided regular diary updates from many of the world's top footballers and also guest interviews from some of the biggest names in the football world. It was the leading portal for footballer websites in the world, housing official personal websites of around 70 players.

Football fans had access to diaries about the inside workings of a football club and their lives as professional footballers, as well as other sections focusing on their biographies and lives off the pitch.

In the past, several high-profile players had used Icons.com to announce major breaking-news stories. For example, Marc Overmars became the first player in history to announce a big-money transfer via his personal website in 2000 when he left Arsenal for Barcelona in a £25million move.

In late 2008, Icons.com became exclusively focused on selling signed memorabilia from the world's best footballers. Icons.com regularly meets past and present players such as Pelé, Diego Maradona, Lionel Messi, Cristiano Ronaldo, Ryan Giggs, Kaká, Cesc Fàbregas, Eric Cantona and Fernando Torres for signing sessions and sells its signed shirts, boots and photos direct to the public through the site and exclusively in-store at Harrods.

Icons.com also supplies the prizes for the weekly Sky Sports programme, Revista de la liga.

== Official licences ==
Icons.com sells or have previously sold official signed memorabilia under licence for the following organisations, tournaments and footballers:

- Lionel Messi
- FIFA World Cup
- UEFA Champions League
- UEFA Europa League
- UEFA Europa Conference League
- UEFA European Championship
- FC Barcelona
- Paris Saint-Germain FC
- Liverpool F.C.
- Manchester City F.C.
- Chelsea F.C.
- AC Milan
- England men's national team
