= Mel Capleton =

English footballer

Personal information
- Full name: Melvyn David Capleton
- Date of birth: 24 October 1973 (age 53)
- Place of birth: Hackney, England
- Position: Goalkeeper

Youth career
- 1986–1990: Tottenham Hotspur

Senior career*
Years	Team	Apps	(Gls)
1990–1993	Southend United	0	(0)
1993–1996	Blackpool	11	(0)
1996–1998	Billericay Town		(0)
1998	Leyton Orient	0	
1998	Southend United	1	(0)
1999–2002	Southend United	56	(0)
2001–2002	→ Grays Athletic (loan)		(0)
2002–2004	Grays Athletic		
2004–2005	St Albans City	4	
2005–2006	Billericay Town		(0)
- * Club domestic league appearances and goals

Melvyn David Capleton (born 24 October 1973) is an English former professional football goalkeeper.

== Career ==
Capleton began his career with Southend United in 1990. Three years later, he joined Billy Ayre's Blackpool on a free transfer. Due to his role as back-up to the Seasiders' first-choice goalkeeper Lee Martin, Capleton only made eleven league appearances in his three years at Bloomfield Road. He was released in May 1996.

After two years with Billericay Town, Leyton Orient offered Capleton a return to the professional game. After only a month with the Londoners, his first club, Southend, signed him for just one game in October 1998. He returned to the club on a permanent basis, however, in March the following year.

Capleton went on to make 56 appearances for Southend in two years. His third season at Roots Hall was spent on loan to Grays Athletic. He made the move permanent in 2002.

He signed for St Albans City in the summer of 2004 but was released at the end of the season. He then joined his former club Billericay Town for a season.

In 2007, he joined Canvey Island as goalkeeping coach.
