= Trevor Fitzpatrick =

English footballer

Personal information
- Full name: Trevor Fitzpatrick
- Date of birth: 19 February 1980 (age 46)
- Place of birth: Frimley, England
- Position: Forward

Senior career*
Years	Team	Apps	(Gls)
1997–2001	Southend United	52	(8)
2001	Shelbourne	?	(?)
2001–2002	Bohemians	?	(?)
- * Club domestic league appearances and goals

Trevor Fitzpatrick (born 19 February 1980) is an English footballer who played as a forward for Southend United, Shelbourne and Bohemians. He represented the Republic of Ireland at the UEFA U-19 Championship in Sweden in 1999 where he won a bronze medal after scoring in the group stages.

He made his debut for Southend United in a Second Division match, in the 2–1 home defeat at Luton Town on 3 January 1998, coming on as a substitute in the 67th minute for Pepe N'Diaye.
