= Simon Livett =

English footballer

Personal information
- Full name: Simon Robert Livett
- Date of birth: 8 January 1969 (age 57)
- Place of birth: East Ham, England
- Height: 1.78 m (5 ft 10 in)
- Position: Midfielder

Youth career
- ?–1987: West Ham United

Senior career*
Years	Team	Apps	(Gls)
1987–1992	West Ham United	1	(0)
1992–1993	Leyton Orient	24	(0)
1993–1994	Cambridge United	12	(0)
1994–1995	Dagenham & Redbridge	25	(4)
1994–1995	Dover Athletic	4	(0)
1995–1996	Romford	19	(2)
1997	FC Lahti	1	(0)
1997–1998	Billericay Town	?	(?)
1997–1998	Grays Athletic	?	(?)
1998–2000	Southend United	23	(1)
2000	Dover Athletic	1	(0)
2000–2001	Boston United	6	(0)
2001	San Diego Flash	15	(1)
2001–2002	Ford United	?	(?)
- * Club domestic league appearances and goals

Simon Robert Livett (born 8 January 1969) is an English former football midfielder.

Livett started his career at West Ham United. He made his debut in a Second Division game against Wolverhampton Wanderers on 15 September 1990, as a replacement for the injured Stuart Slater, although he himself was struck but an injury that saw him substituted at half-time. He played in one other competitive game, an FA Cup 3rd Round game against Aldershot on 5 January 1991, and also played a Full Members' Cup game against Luton Town.

Livett joined Leyton Orient on a free transfer on 10 August 1992. He also played for Cambridge United, Dagenham & Redbridge, Southend United, Dover and Boston United.
