= Mike Newell (footballer) =

English footballer and manager

Personal information
- Full name: Michael Colin Newell
- Date of birth: 27 January 1965 (age 61)
- Place of birth: Liverpool, England
- Height: 6 ft 0 in (1.83 m)
- Position: Striker

Youth career
- 1977–1983: Liverpool

Senior career*
Years	Team	Apps	(Gls)
1983	Crewe Alexandra	3	(0)
1983–1986	Wigan Athletic	72	(25)
1986–1987	Luton Town	63	(18)
1987–1989	Leicester City	81	(21)
1989–1991	Everton	68	(15)
1991–1996	Blackburn Rovers	130	(28)
1996–1997	Birmingham City	15	(1)
1996–1997	→ West Ham United (loan)	7	(0)
1997	→ Bradford City (loan)	7	(0)
1997–1999	Aberdeen	44	(6)
1999	Crewe Alexandra	4	(0)
1999–2000	Doncaster Rovers	16	(3)
2000–2001	Blackpool	18	(2)
Total		528	(119)

International career
1986	England U21	4	(0)
1989	England B	2	(1)

Managerial career
- 2001–2002: Tranmere Rovers (reserve team)
- 2002: Doncaster Rovers (coach)
- 2002–2003: Hartlepool United
- 2003–2007: Luton Town
- 2008–2009: Grimsby Town
- 2017: Al-Shabab (Head of Football)
- 2018–2019: Wrexham (assistant)
- 2021: Waterford (assistant)
- * Club domestic league appearances and goals

Michael Colin Newell (born 27 January 1965) is an English football manager and former professional footballer.

As a player, he was a striker and represented 13 different clubs in his career, playing a total of 530 league games and scoring 120 goals. He was a member of the Blackburn Rovers team which won the Premier League in 1995, and in a game against Rosenborg in the 1995–96 season, Newell scored (what was at the time) the fastest-ever hat-trick in the UEFA Champions League, netting his three goals in a spell of only nine minutes. Newell also played for Crewe Alexandra, Wigan Athletic, Luton Town, Leicester City, Everton, Birmingham City, West Ham United, Bradford City, Aberdeen, Doncaster Rovers and Blackpool between the years of 1982 and 2001. Newell totalled £3,585,000 in transfer fees over the duration of his career. As a manager, he has had spells with Hartlepool United, Luton Town and Grimsby Town.

== Playing career ==
Newell played for Liverpool's youth teams as a schoolboy, but was released without being offered terms. He made three league appearances for Crewe Alexandra in 1983 as part of a trial, before signing for Wigan Athletic of the Third Division in October of that year. After scoring 25 goals at this level, Newell moved up to the First Division in January 1986 when he joined Luton Town for £85,000. On 26 October 1986, he scored a hat-trick in a 4–1 league win over Liverpool – the defending double-winners and the dominant English league side of that time.

Early in the 1987–88 season, he dropped down a division to sign for Leicester City, now managed by David Pleat - the man who had signed him for Luton two seasons earlier.

He scored a total of 21 Second Division goals at Filbert Street but was unable to secure promotion to the First Division and joined Everton for £1.1million in the summer of 1989.

Newell's form at Goodison Park was unremarkable as he formed a three-man strike force with Graeme Sharp and Tony Cottee, and with three strikers in the first eleven there was little pressure on any of them to score 20 or 30 goals a season. However, the three-man strike force was looking like a success as they spearheaded Everton to the top of the league in late autumn of 1989 and were starting to look like serious title contenders for perhaps the first time since Howard Kendall's departure as manager in June 1987, but Everton were unable to maintain this form and dipped to sixth place in the final table. Newell had managed seven goals that season from 26 league appearances. Shortly after joining Everton he was called up to the senior England squad by Bobby Robson for a game against Poland, but he remained on the bench and was ultimately never capped at senior level.

1990–91 began terribly for Everton. By 31 October 1990, they were a lowly 18th in the league and had endured their worst ever start to a league campaign - battling relegation only a year since they had led the league and looked good bets for the title. Manager Colin Harvey paid for this nightmare start to the season with his job, only to rejoin Everton a week later when Howard Kendall began his second spell as manager and appointed Harvey as his assistant in the old manager/coach partnership that had brought so much success from 1981 to 1987. Newell initially remained in favour under Kendall, scoring seven goals again that season, one of them in a 2–0 win over Manchester United on 2 March 1991 in a game which also saw the Manchester United debut of Ryan Giggs.

Despite the arrival of Peter Beardsley from Liverpool for the 1991–92 season, Newell managed to make 13 league appearances for Everton (scoring once) before his £1.1 million transfer to Second Division promotion challengers Blackburn Rovers, managed by former Liverpool player and manager Kenny Dalglish and bankrolled by the wealth of owner Jack Walker. He was Blackburn's record signing at the time, and the most expensive player yet to be signed by a club outside the top flight.

He broke his leg soon afterwards, and Blackburn went from being Second Division leaders to having to win their final game of the season to achieve a playoff place, but Newell was fit for the playoffs and after helping them overcome Derby County in the semi-finals, he scored the penalty in their 1–0 playoff final win over his former club Leicester City at Wembley Stadium as they sealed a place in the new FA Premier League and ended their 26-year absence from the top flight of English football.

In 1992–93, Newell was Blackburn's second highest goalscorer with 13 league goals as they finished fourth in the Premier League. They had looked like championship contenders for much of the season, but Newell lacked the much-needed support up front after late December when strike partner Alan Shearer suffered a serious knee injury and missed the rest of the season. However, he managed six goals in 28 games in 1993–94, battling it out with Kevin Gallacher for the role of Shearer's strike partner as Blackburn finished second. But the arrival of Chris Sutton for the 1994–95 saw Newell fall behind in the pecking order at Ewood Park. Blackburn finished the season as league champions for the first time in 81 years. However, he did meet the requirement of ten league appearances for a title medal, starting two league games and appearing a further ten times as a substitute, although he failed to score a goal that season.

Newell scored the 1,000th goal of the Premier League era during Blackburn's 3–1 win at Nottingham Forest in April 1993. Newell also held the record for the fastest hat-trick in Champions League history after scoring three goals in nine minutes for Blackburn against Rosenborg BK in the 1995–96 season, until this was broken in the 2011–12 season by Bafétimbi Gomis of Lyon with three in seven minutes. His hat-trick also made history as the first by an English player in the newly re-branded UEFA Champions League since its transformation from the five-round knockout format of the original European Cup.

He left Blackburn for Birmingham City for £750,000 in the summer of 1996. However, this spell proved to be unsuccessful, Newell scoring only three times with a strike against Sheffield United in the league and a brace against Brighton in the League Cup. This was the beginning of a five-year spell at seven different clubs. Newell left Birmingham to join West Ham United on loan in December 1996, before a similar spell at Bradford City in March 1997. Before he was loaned to West Ham, Birmingham had accepted a £750,000 bid from Bolton Wanderers for Newell, but he was unable to agree a contract and the transfer fell through.

In the summer of 1997, Newell left the English league for the first time when he was transferred to Aberdeen, before returning to the English leagues with Crewe, Doncaster Rovers and finally Blackpool. He retired from playing in May 2001, going out on a high as Blackpool celebrated promotion as Division Three playoff winners. In November 2003 Newell was registered as a player for Luton to provide cover he fully retired in June 2004.

== Managerial career ==
=== Tranmere Rovers ===
After retiring, Newell was appointed as the reserve team manager of Tranmere Rovers in October 2001, as well as working alongside the first team manager with all the professionals through the week.

=== Hartlepool United ===
After a coaching job at Doncaster Rovers, Newell replaced Chris Turner as manager of Hartlepool United during the 2002–03 season, when Hartlepool were top of Division Three. After horrendous away form, the club lost a 16-point lead it held, though promotion as runners-up was still sealed. After this, and many personal differences between Newell and the board at Hartlepool, Newell's contract was not renewed in the summer of 2003, and he was replaced by Neale Cooper.

=== Luton Town ===
Shortly after leaving Hartlepool, he was appointed manager of Luton Town by controversial chairman John Gurney, who, having just purchased the club, sacked the popular management team of Joe Kinnear and Mick Harford. It was reported that Newell won a Pop Idol-style poll to become manager but he was offered and signed a contract before the "results" were announced. Shortly after taking over, the club went into administrative receivership which saw several players leave the club. Despite this, Newell succeeded in taking the club near the play-offs of Division Two.

The following season, Luton became the first-ever champions of the newly re-branded League One, winning 98 points and gaining promotion to the Championship. Newell guided Luton to further success in the 2005–06 season, which saw Luton finish 10th in the Championship – their highest finish since they relegated from the top flight in 1992. Luton also became one of only two clubs to defeat runaway champions Reading. Newell was linked with jobs at several larger clubs, such as Leicester City, but remained at Luton and later signed a four-year contract.

Newell's relationship with Luton turned sour after a poor start to the 2006–07 season, in which he criticised chairman Bill Tomlins' running of the club. After a number of players departed in the summer of 2006, and then more in January 2007, the club was in a relegation battle. Newell was sacked by Luton in March 2007 after criticising the club's board for not investing enough money into the club.

=== Grimsby Town ===
Mike Newell was unveiled as the new manager of Grimsby Town at a press conference on 6 October 2008, signing a three-and-a-half-year contract at Blundell Park. Grimsby were just two places above the League Two relegation zone at the time and one of only two senior clubs in England without a victory, with only the three sides who had been docked points below them in the table. Newell's first game was a league match at home to top of the table Wycombe Wanderers, which ended in a 1–1 draw after Grimsby had led for most of the match. He recorded his and Grimsby's first victory of the season in his ninth game in charge, a 2–0 victory at Bury on 15 November. Newell was given time and money by the Grimsby board to avoid relegation, a feat accomplished with some shrewd deals in the transfer market. His ability to attract a seemingly higher pedigree of player paid off, and the Mariners avoided relegation by four points.

For 2009–10, Newell was given funds to sign former loanees Peter Sweeney, Barry Conlon, Joe Widdowson and Adrian Forbes. He bolstered the ranks further with midfielder Michael Leary, striker Chris Jones and Sunderland goalkeeper Nick Colgan. The Mariners also turned down a lucrative offer from Peterborough United for captain Ryan Bennett. Supporters were optimistic that Grimsby Town could have a successful season. However, the club only gained ten points from their opening thirteen games. A 0–2 home defeat to Rochdale on 17 October 2009 dropped the Mariners into the League Two relegation zone. Newell was dismissed the following day, despite chairman John Fenty's assertion a week earlier that certain under-performing players would be shown the door before Newell.

=== Wrexham ===
Newell was appointed assistant to Graham Barrow, manager of National League club Wrexham, in December 2018. Two days after Barrow was fired, Newell also decided to leave the club by mutual consent on 7 February 2019.

=== Waterford ===
On 17 December 2020, Newell was appointed assistant to Kevin Sheedy as the new managerial team at League of Ireland Premier Division side Waterford. Newell received a red card on the touchline in the opening game of the season away to Drogheda United before returning from his three-match ban away to St Patrick's Athletic, where he received another red card following an argument with the referee over the colour of sock tape. This resulted in a four-match ban. Sheedy and Newell left the club "by mutual consent" on 5 May 2021 with the club bottom of the table after nine games.

== Controversies ==
Following a match against Queens Park Rangers on 11 November 2006 Newell criticised female assistant referee, Amy Rayner, using sexist comments, and later apologised. He also criticised Luton chairman Bill Tomlins. For this he was reprimanded by his club, which publicly disassociated itself from Newell's comments concerning Rayner.

Following a match against West Bromwich Albion on 12 January 2007, Newell criticised the influence of foreign players in the English game, stating that it was "going soft." This was after an incident in which Luton midfielder David Bell appeared to be fouled, play continued and West Brom went on to not only equalise minutes before the end, but to claim a last gasp winner to leave Luton empty handed.

In February 2010, five months after Newell's sacking from Grimsby Town, he began court proceedings to sue Grimsby and John Fenty, claiming he was owed £53,845.61 in lost earnings as well as claiming a drunk Fenty had slammed a chair on the floor and pulled on Newell's tie following his final game in charge. The two parties eventually settled out of court and agreed on a sum of £5,000, with Newell's eventual reason for being sacked revealed as gross misconduct.

In May 2019, Newell's former Grimsby player Paul Linwood appeared on the "I Had Trials Once" podcast on Spotify. In the interview Linwood spoke about his time at Grimsby during the 2009–10 season. Linwood said that he and other players never took to living in Grimsby and alleged that the team was "full of alcoholics". He claimed that the club's "biggest mistake" was sacking Newell who had joined in with the drinking culture at the club.

=== Corruption allegations ===
Newell caused a huge stir in the footballing world when he claimed that corruption was "rife" in transfer deals. In particular, he claimed that he had been offered "bungs" or bribes by football agents and agreed to name the offending parties when called upon by the FA. As a result, an enquiry was launched by the FA and was headed by Lord Stevens, a former Metropolitan Police commissioner. On 20 December 2006, Stevens presented his preliminary report, which found that, although the level of corruption within English football was not as high as had been anticipated, there were several causes for concern, and 17 transfer deals were still subject to further scrutiny.

== Personal life ==
Newell's son George, also a striker, made his first-team debut for Bolton Wanderers in April 2016.

== Honours ==
=== As a player ===
Wigan Athletic

- Associate Members' Cup: 1984–85

Everton

- Full Members' Cup runner-up: 1990–91

Blackburn Rovers

- Premier League: 1994–95
- Football League Second Division play-offs: 1992

Doncaster Rovers

- Conference League Cup: 1999–2000

=== As a manager ===
Hartlepool United

- Football League Third Division second-place promotion: 2002–03

Luton Town

- Football League One: 2004–05

Individual

- LMA League One Manager of the Year: 2004–05
- Football League One Manager of the Month: August 2004, April 2005
- LMA League One Manager of the Month: February 2004
- LMA League Two Manager of the Month: January 2003

== Managerial statistics ==
Team	From	To	Record				
Team	From	To	G	W	D	L	Win %
Hartlepool United	21 November 2002	30 May 2003	29	13	9	7	44.82
Luton Town	23 June 2003	15 March 2007	200	83	49	68	41.50
Grimsby Town	6 October 2008	18 October 2009	53	13	11	29	24.53
