= Neil Woods =

English football manager

Personal information
- Full name: Neil Stephen Woods
- Date of birth: 30 July 1966 (age 60)
- Place of birth: York, England
- Height: 5 ft 11 in (1.80 m)
- Position: Striker

Team information
- Current team: Grimsby Town (Academy Manager)

Youth career
- Doncaster Rovers

Senior career*
Years	Team	Apps	(Gls)
1983–1986	Doncaster Rovers	65	(16)
1986–1987	Rangers	3	(0)
1987–1990	Ipswich Town	27	(5)
1990	Bradford City	14	(2)
1990–1998	Grimsby Town	228	(42)
1997	→ Wigan Athletic (loan)	2	(0)
1998	→ Scunthorpe United (loan)	2	(0)
1998	→ Mansfield Town (loan)	6	(0)
1998–1999	York City	8	(0)
1999–2000	Southport	13	(2)
2000	Gainsborough Trinity	6	(2)
Total		374	(69)

Managerial career
- 2003–2009: Grimsby Town (Youths)
- 2009–2011: Grimsby Town
- 2011–2016: Walsall (Youths)
- 2016–: Grimsby Town (Youths)
- * Club domestic league appearances and goals

Neil Stephen Woods (born 30 July 1966) is an English football manager and former professional footballer who is academy manager at Grimsby Town.

As a player, he was a striker from 1983 to 2000 for Doncaster Rovers, Rangers, Ipswich Town, Bradford City, Grimsby Town, Wigan Athletic, Scunthorpe United, Mansfield Town, York City, Southport and Gainsborough Trinity. After retiring from playing he took up a role at Grimsby Town as youth team manager in 2003 before later managing the club from 2009 to 2011. Following his dismissal he was appointed academy manager at Walsall before returning to a similar position at Grimsby in October 2016.

== Playing career ==
Having started his career with Doncaster Rovers, he signed for Rangers on 22 December 1986 for a fee of £120,000. After making only three substitute appearances he signed for Ipswich Town on 3 August 1987 for £120,000, he then spent three seasons there before being able to sign for Bradford City on a free transfer. On 23 August 1990, he signed for Grimsby Town for £82,000 where he had a successful eight-year stay and where he would later become the youth team coach. Also whilst at Grimsby Town he was loaned out to Wigan Athletic, Scunthorpe United, Mansfield Town for short spells. He later had short spells with York City and Southport before ending his career with Gainsborough Trinity.

== Coaching career ==
=== Youth team manager ===
In 2003 Woods was appointed Youth Team manager at Grimsby Town, after Paul Wilkinson left the position to move to Cardiff City. A number of players have made the first team grade after promotion from Neil's youth side. Danny North and Peter Bore are two products of the Grimsby youth side who have enjoyed lengthy spells in the first team, while striker Cameron Jerome spent time under Woods before moving on to other clubs.

=== Spell as First team manager ===
He was appointed as caretaker manager at Grimsby on 18 October 2009 following the sacking of manager Mike Newell. Despite failing to win a single game whilst in caretaker charge, chairman John Fenty appointed him as full-time manager of Grimsby Town on 23 November 2009 in somewhat controversial circumstances after the club had snubbed the application of former manager Russell Slade. Despite making numerous changes to the squad and the club's training regime, Woods failed to lead the team to victory in his first 22 games in charge, resulting in a record 25 game win-less streak for the club. His first win came on Saturday 6 March 2010, with a 3–0 victory over Shrewsbury, his first victory as first team manager.

Just when all hope of Football League survival seemed lost for Grimsby, he took his side to already relegated Darlington on 24 April 2010, where their survival hopes were given a massive and perhaps surprising boost by a 2–0 victory for themselves and a defeat for Barnet, while Cheltenham Town (the other relegation threatened team) were held to a goalless draw. The following week saw 22nd placed Barnet travel to Blundell Park, which saw Grimsby take the relegation scrap to the final day of the season after a 2–0 win. However a final-day 3–0 defeat at Burton Albion saw Grimsby fall into the Conference National.

Despite the club recently defeating rivals Mansfield Town 7–2 followed by a 6–1 win over Histon. Woods was relieved of his duties on 23 February 2011 following a 1–1 home draw with relegation strugglers Forest Green Rovers. The Mariners were 9th in the league, with assistant manager David Moore taking over as caretaker manager.

On 1 March 2011, it was announced that Woods could be returning to Grimsby in some capacity or another, this previously happened when Grimsby sacked former manager Graham Rodger in 2006 but instantly employed him again as a community coach. Both Woods and Rodger had been long serving servants to the club as both players and coaches.

=== Move to Walsall ===
On 24 June 2011, Woods was appointed Head of Youth at Football League One side Walsall.

=== Return to Grimsby's Academy ===
On 20 October 2016, it was announced that Woods would be returning to Grimsby Town as the club's Academy Manager.

On 28 December 2020, caretaker manager Ben Davies announced that Woods was assisting him with first team affairs following the resignation of Ian Holloway.

== Personal life ==
His father Alan Woods was also a footballer, while his nephew Michael Woods played for Chelsea before being released in 2011.

== Honours ==
Grimsby Town

- Football League Second Division play-offs: 1998
- Football League Trophy: 1997–98
