= 2007–08 Grimsby Town F.C. season =

Grimsby Town
2007–08 season
- Chairman: John Fenty
- Manager: Alan Buckley
- League Two: 16th
- FA Cup: Second round
- League Cup: First round
- Football League Trophy: Runners Up
- Lincolnshire Senior Cup: Semi-final
- Top goalscorer: League: Danny North(9); All: Danny North(9)
- Highest home attendance: 7,417 v Morecambe (4 March 2008)
- Lowest home attendance: 1,204 v Huddersfield Town (4 September 2007)
Home colours	Away colours

== Fixtures and results ==
=== Legend ===
Win	Draw	Loss

=== Pre-season matches ===
==== Friendlies ====
Date	Opponent	Venue	Result	Attendance	Scorers
13 Jul	Brigg Town	The Hawthorns, Brigg	W 3 - 1	-	Bore, North (2)
21 Jul	Farsley Celtic	Throstle Nest, Farsley	L 0 - 2	-	-
24 Jul	Hull City	Blundell Park, Cleethorpes	L 0 - 1	-	-
31 Jul	Grantham Town	South Kesteven Sports Ground, Grantham	W 3 - 0	-	Hegarty, Taylor (2)
4 Aug	Scunthorpe United	Blundell Park, Cleethorpes	D 1 - 1	-	North

==== Lincolnshire Cup ====
Date	Opponent	Venue	Result	Attendance	Scorers
17 Jul	Gainsborough Trinity	The Northolme, Gainsborough	L 0 - 1	-	-

=== Football League Two ===
Date	Opponent	Venue	Result	Attendance	Scorers
11 Aug	Notts County	Blundell Park, Cleethorpes	D 1 - 1	-	Bennett
18 Aug	Bury	Gigg Lane, Bury	D 1 - 1	-	Bolland
25 Aug	Macclesfield Town	Blundell Park, Cleethorpes	D 1 - 1	-	Taylor
Sept 01	Shrewsbury Town	New Meadow, Shrewsbury	L 1 - 2	-	Toner
Sept 08	Accrington Stanley	Crown Ground, Accrington	L 1 - 4	-	Bolland
Sept 15	Stockport County	Blundell Park, Cleethorpes	D 1 - 1	-	Bolland
Sept 22	Lincoln City	Sincil Bank, Lincoln	W 2 - 1	-	Whittle, Toner
Sept 29	Hereford United	Blundell Park, Cleethorpes	W 2 - 1	-	Boshell, Newey
2 Oct	Chester City	Blundell Park, Cleethorpes	L 1 - 2	-	Boshell
6 Oct	Peterborough United	London Road, Peterborough	L 1 - 2	-	Toner
12 Oct	Rochdale	Blundell Park, Cleethorpes	L 1 - 2	-	Logan
20 Oct	Wycombe Wanderers	Adams Park, Wycombe	L 0 - 3	-	-
27 Oct	Bradford City	Blundell Park, Cleethorpes	D 1 - 1	-	Logan
3 Nov	Rotherham United	Millmoor, Rotherham	L 1 - 2	-	Fenton
6 Nov	Milton Keynes Dons	stadium:mk, Milton Keynes	L 0 - 2	-	-
17 Nov	Morecambe	Blundell Park, Cleethorpes	L 1 - 2	-	Taylor
24 Nov	Barnet	Underhill, Barnet, London	W 3 - 0	-	North (2), Taylor
4 Dec	Darlington	Blundell Park, Cleethorpes	L 0 - 4	-	-
8 Dec	Brentford	Griffin Park, Brentford, London	W 1 - 0	-	Jones
15 Dec	Mansfield Town	Blundell Park, Cleethorpes	W 1 - 0	-	Jones
22 Dec	Stockport County	Edgeley Park, Stockport	D 1 - 1	-	Butler
26 Dec	Accrington Stanley	Blundell Park, Cleethorpes	L 1 - 2	-	Hegarty
29 Dec	Lincoln City	Blundell Park, Cleethorpes	W 1 - 0	-	Jones
1 Jan	Chester City	Deva Stadium, Chester	W 2 - 1	-	Boshell, Atkinson
5 Jan	Chesterfield	Saltergate, Chesterfield	W 2 - 1	-	North (2)
12 Jan	Wrexham	Blundell Park, Cleethorpes	W 1 - 0	-	North
19 Jan	Dag & Red	Victoria Road, Dagenham, London	D 0 - 0	-	-
26 Jan	Shrewsbury Town	Blundell Park, Cleethorpes	D 1 - 1	-	North
29 Jan	Bury	Blundell Park, Cleethorpes	W 1 - 0	-	Clarke
2 Feb	Notts County	Meadow Lane, Nottingham	D 1 - 1	-	Fenton
9 Feb	Chesterfield	Blundell Park, Cleethorpes	W 4 - 2	-	Boshell (2), North, Hegarty
12 Feb	Macclesfield Town	Moss Rose, Macclesfield	W 2 - 1	-	North, Clarke
16 Feb	Dag & Red	Blundell Park, Cleethorpes	L 1 - 4	-	Jones
23 Feb	Wrexham	Racecourse Ground, Wrexham	D 0 - 0	-	-
1 Mar	Morecambe	Christie Park, Morecambe	W 4 - 0	-	Bore (2), Hegarty, Butler
7 Mar	Milton Keynes Dons	Blundell Park, Cleethorpes	L 0 - 1	-	-
11 Mar	Barnet	Blundell Park, Cleethorpes	W 4 - 1	-	Hegarty, Bolland, Butler, Taylor
15 Mar	Darlington	Balfour Webnet Darlington Arena, Darlington	L 2 - 3	-	Butler (2)
22 Mar	Mansfield Town	Field Mill, Mansfield	W 2 - 1	-	Till, Boshell
24 Mar	Brentford	Blundell Park, Cleethorpes	L 1 - 2	-	North
5 Apr	Rochdale	Spotland Stadium, Rochdale	L 1 - 3	-	Taylor
12 Apr	Rotherham United	Blundell Park, Cleethorpes	L 0 - 1	-	-
15 Apr	Wycombe Wanderers	Blundell Park, Cleethorpes	L 0 - 1	-	-
19 Apr	Bradford City	Valley Parade, Bradford	L 1 - 2	-	Till
26 Apr	Peterborough United	Blundell Park, Cleethorpes	L 1 - 4	-	Butler
5 May	Hereford United	Edgar Street, Hereford	L 0 - 2	-	-

=== FA Cup ===
Date	Opponent	Venue	Result	Attendance	Scorers
10 Nov	Carlisle United	Brunton Park, Carlisle	D 1 - 1	-	Bolland
20 Nov	Carlisle United	Blundell Park, Cleethorpes	W 1 - 0	-	Jones
1 Dec	Huddersfield Town	Galpharm Stadium, Huddersfield	L 0 - 3	-	-

=== League Cup ===
Date	Opponent	Venue	Result	Attendance	Scorers
14 Aug	Burnley	Blundell Park, Cleethorpes	D 1 - 1	-	North, Burnley win 4–2 on penalties

=== Football League Trophy ===
Date	Opponent	Venue	Result	Attendance	Scorers
4 Sep	Huddersfield Town	Blundell Park, Cleethorpes	W 4 - 1	-	Fenton, Toner, Rankin, Till
9 Oct	Rotherham United	Millmoor, Rotherham	D 1 - 1	-	Till, Grimsby win 4–2 on penalties
13 Nov	Doncaster Rovers	Blundell Park, Cleethorpes	D 2 - 2	-	Boshell, Mills (O.G), Grimsby win 5–4 on penalties
8 Jan	Stockport County	Edgeley Park, Stockport	W 2 - 1	-	Clarke, Raynes (O.G)
26 Feb	Morecambe	Christie Park, Morecambe	W 1 - 0	-	Bolland
4 Mar	Morecambe	Blundell Park, Grimsby	D 0 - 0	-	-
30 Mar	Milton Keynes Dons	Wembley Stadium, Wembley, London	L 0 - 2	-	-

== League table ==
Pos	Team	Pld	W	D	L	GF	GA	GD	Pts
14	Brentford	46	17	8	21	52	70	−18	59
15	Lincoln City	46	18	4	24	61	77	−16	58
16	Grimsby Town	46	15	10	21	55	66	−11	55
17	Accrington Stanley	46	16	3	27	49	83	−34	51
18	Shrewsbury Town	46	12	14	20	56	65	−9	50

Updated to match(es) played on 3 May 2008. Source: The Football League
Rules for classification: 1) points; 2) goal difference; 3) number of goals scored.

== Coaching staff ==
Role	Nationality	Name
First-Team Manager	(England)	Alan Buckley
First-Team Assistant Manager	(England)	Stuart Watkiss
Reserve Team Manager	(England)	Stuart Watkiss
Head of Youth	(England)	Neil Woods
Youth Team Manager	(England)	Neil Woods
Goalkeeping Coach	(England)	Steve Croudson
Physiotherapist	(England)	David Moore
Community Sport Coach	(England)	Gary Childs
Community Sport Coach	(England)	Graham Rodger

Charlie lofts

== Squad overview ==
Note: Flags indicate national team as defined under FIFA eligibility rules; some limited exceptions apply. Players may hold more than one non-FIFA nationality.

No.	Pos.	Nation	Player
1	GK	ENG	Phil Barnes
2	DF	ENG	Jamie Clarke
3	DF	ENG	Tom Newey
4	MF	ENG	James Hunt
5	DF	ENG	Ryan Bennett
6	DF	ENG	Nick Fenton
7	MF	ENG	Peter Till
8	MF	ENG	Paul Bolland
9	FW	ENG	Danny North
10	MF	NIR	Ciaran Toner
11	MF	ENG	Danny Boshell
13	GK	ENG	Gary Montgomery
14	DF	ENG	Shaleum Logan (on loan from Manchester City)
14	DF	NZL	David Mulligan (on loan from Scunthorpe United)

No.	Pos.	Nation	Player
14	DF	ENG	Sam Hird (on loan from Doncaster Rovers)
15	DF	ENG	Justin Whittle
16	FW	ENG	Isaiah Rankin (Departed in January 2008)
16	MF	ENG	Grant Normington
17	MF	ENG	Nick Hegarty
18	MF	ENG	Peter Bore
19	FW	ENG	Gary Jones
20	FW	ENG	Andy Taylor
21	FW	ENG	Nathan Jarman
22	DF	ENG	Luke Foulkes (Departed in October 2007)
22	DF	ENG	Matthew Bird
23	FW	ENG	Martin Butler
24	GK	ENG	Leigh Overton
25	DF	ENG	Rob Atkinson (on loan from Barnsley)

=== Appearances and goals ===
No.	Pos	Nat	Player	Total		League Two		League Cup		Football League Trophy		FA Cup	
No.	Pos	Nat	Player	Apps	Goals	Apps	Goals	Apps	Goals	Apps	Goals	Apps	Goals
1	GK	(England) ENG	Phil Barnes	51	0	42	0	1	0	7	0	1	0
2	DF	(England) ENG	Jamie Clarke	38	3	29	2	0	0	7	1	2	0
3	DF	(England) ENG	Tom Newey	52	1	42	1	1	0	6	0	3	0
4	MF	(England) ENG	James Hunt	46	0	37	0	1	0	5	0	3	0
5	DF	(England) ENG	Ryan Bennett	48	1	40	1	1	0	4	0	3	0
6	DF	(England) ENG	Nick Fenton	53	3	42	2	1	0	7	1	3	0
7	MF	(England) ENG	Peter Till	44	4	34	2	1	0	6	2	3	0
8	MF	(England) ENG	Paul Bolland	45	6	35	4	1	0	6	1	3	1
9	FW	(England) ENG	Danny North	36	10	27	9	1	1	6	0	2	0
10	MF	(Northern Ireland) NIR	Ciaran Toner	37	4	30	3	1	0	3	1	3	0
11	MF	(England) ENG	Danny Boshell	48	7	40	6	1	0	6	1	1	0
13	GK	(England) ENG	Gary Montgomery	7	0	5	0	0	0	0	0	2	0
14	DF	(New Zealand) NZL	David Mulligan (on loan from Scunthorpe United)	7	0	6	0	0	0	1	0	0	0
14	DF	(England) ENG	Shaleum Logan (on loan from Manchester City)	5	2	5	2	0	0	0	0	0	0
14	DF	(England) ENG	Sam Hird (on loan from Doncaster Rovers)	18	0	17	0	0	0	0	0	1	0
15	DF	(England) ENG	Justin Whittle	23	1	18	1	1	0	3	0	1	0
16	FW	(England) ENG	Isaiah Rankin	19	1	17	0	0	0	1	1	1	0
16	MF	(England) ENG	Grant Normington	0	0	0	0	0	0	0	0	0	0
17	MF	(England) ENG	Nick Hegarty	37	4	30	4	0	0	2	0	5	0
18	MF	(England) ENG	Peter Bore	23	2	17	2	1	0	4	0	1	0
19	FW	(England) ENG	Gary Jones	46	5	36	4	1	0	6	0	3	1
20	FW	(England) ENG	Andy Taylor	30	5	26	5	0	0	2	0	2	0
21	FW	(England) ENG	Nathan Jarman	8	0	7	0	0	0	1	0	0	0
22	DF	(England) ENG	Luke Foulkes	0	0	0	0	0	0	0	0	0	0
22	DF	(England) ENG	Matthew Bird	2	0	2	0	0	0	0	0	0	0
23	FW	(England) ENG	Martin Butler	22	6	21	6	0	0	0	0	1	0
24	GK	(England) ENG	Leigh Overton	0	0	0	0	0	0	0	0	0	0
25	DF	(England) ENG	Rob Atkinson (on loan from Barnsley)	28	1	24	1	0	0	4	0	0	0

=== Loaned out player stats ===
No.	Pos	Nat	Player	Total		League Two		League Cup		Football League Trophy		FA Cup	
No.	Pos	Nat	Player	Apps	Goals	Apps	Goals	Apps	Goals	Apps	Goals	Apps	Goals
17	MF	(England) ENG	Nick Hegarty (on loan at York City)	2	0	2	0	0	0	0	0	0	0

=== Most frequent starting line-up ===

Most frequent starting line-up uses the team's most used formation: 4-4-2. The players used are those who have played the most games in each respective position, not necessarily who have played most games out of all the players.

== Transfers ==
=== Pre Season ===
==== In ====
#	Player	From	Age	Fee
02	(England) Jamie Clarke	(England) Boston United	24	Free Transfer
04	(England) James Hunt	(England) Bristol Rovers	30	Free Transfer
13	(England) Gary Montgomery	(England) Rotherham United	24	Free Transfer
22	(England) Luke Foulkes	(England) Grimsby Town Youth Academy	18	Professional Contract

==== Mid Season ====
#	Player	From	Age	Fee
14	(England) Sam Hird	(England) Doncaster Rovers	20	Loan
14	(England) Shaleum Logan	(England) Manchester City	18	Loan
14	(New Zealand) David Mulligan	(England) Scunthorpe United	25	Loan
16	(England) Grant Normington	(England) Grimsby Town Youth Academy	17	Professional Contract
21	(England) Nathan Jarman	(England) Barnsley	21	Free Transfer
22	(England) Matthew Bird	(England) Grimsby Town Youth Academy	18	Professional Contract
23	(England) Martin Butler	(England) Walsall	33	Loan
23	(England) Martin Butler	(England) Walsall	33	Free Transfer
24	(England) Leigh Overton	(England) Grimsby Town Youth Academy	17	Professional Contract
25	(England) Rob Atkinson	(England) Barnsley	20	Loan

=== Out ===
==== Pre Season ====
#	Player	To	Age	Fee
02	(England) John McDermott	Released	37	Retired
04	(Scotland) Gary Harkins	(Scotland) Partick Thistle	22	Free Transfer
09	(Republic of Ireland) Michael Reddy	Released	27	Retired through injury
13	(England) Robert Murray	(England) King's Lynn	20	Free Transfer
15	(England) Gary Cohen	Released	23	Retired through Injury
20	(England) Gary Croft	(England) Lincoln City	33	Free Transfer
24	(England) Simon Grand	(England) Morecambe	23	Free Transfer
27	(England) Tony Thorpe	(England) Tamworth	33	Free Transfer
29	(England) Matthew Bloomer	(England) Boston United	28	Free Transfer

==== Mid Season ====
#	Player	To	Age	Fee
16	(England) Isaiah Rankin	(England) Stevenage Borough	29	Free Transfer
17	(England) Nick Hegarty	(England) York City	22	Loan
22	(England) Luke Foulkes	(England) Boston United	18	Free Transfer
