= 2008 Football League Trophy final =

2008 Football League Trophy Final
- Event: 2007–08 Football League Trophy
| Grimsby Town | Milton Keynes Dons |
| 0 | 2 |
- Date: 30 March 2008
- Venue: Wembley Stadium, London
- Referee: Phil Joslin (Kent)
- Attendance: 56,618

The 2008 Football League Trophy Final was the 25th final of the domestic football cup competition for teams from Football Leagues One and Two, the Football League Trophy. The final was played at Wembley Stadium in London on 30 March 2008, the first time that the final had been staged at the stadium since it was rebuilt.

The match was contested by Grimsby Town and Milton Keynes Dons. MK Dons won the match 2–0 with Keith Andrews and Sean O'Hanlon scoring the goals in the final 20 minutes.

== Match details ==
30 March 2008
13:15 BST

| Grimsby Town | 0–2 | Milton Keynes Dons |
|---|---|---|
| | | Andrews 74' (pen.); O'Hanlon 81' |

Wembley Stadium, London
Attendance: 56,618
Referee: Phil Joslin (Nottinghamshire)

| Grimsby Town | MK Dons |

| GK | 1 | Phil Barnes |
| RB | 2 | Jamie Clarke |
| CB | 25 | Rob Atkinson |
| CB | 6 | Nick Fenton (c) |
| LB | 3 | Tom Newey |
| RM | 11 | Danny Boshell | Booked |
| CM | 4 | James Hunt | (substituted off) 79' |
| CM | 15 | Paul Bolland |
| LM | 17 | Nick Hegarty |
| CF | 7 | Peter Till | (substituted off) 61' |
| CF | 9 | Danny North | (substituted off) 46' |
Substitutes:
| GK | 13 | Gary Montgomery |
| DF | 5 | Ryan Bennett |
| MF | 10 | Ciarán Toner | | (substituted on) 79' |
| MF | 18 | Peter Bore | | (substituted on) 46' |
| CF | 19 | Gary Jones | | (substituted on) 61' |
Manager:
Alan Buckley

| GK | 12 | Willy Guéret |
| RB | 2 | Jude Stirling |
| CB | 6 | Sean O'Hanlon |
| CB | 25 | Danny Swailes |
| LB | 3 | Dean Lewington (c) |
| RM | 4 | Keith Andrews |
| CM | 20 | Alan Navarro | Booked |
| LM | 11 | Lloyd Dyer |
| CF | 10 | Colin Cameron | (substituted off) 90' |
| CF | 23 | Jemal Johnson | (substituted off) 77' |
| CF | 8 | Kevin Gallen | (substituted off) 77' |
Substitutes:
| GK | 29 | Nathan Abbey |
| DF | 13 | Gareth Edds |
| MF | 14 | Mark Wright | | (substituted on) 77' |
| FW | 16 | Aaron Wilbraham | | (substituted on) 77' |
| FW | 36 | Sam Baldock | | (substituted on) 90' |
Manager:
Paul Ince

MATCH OFFICIALS

- Assistant referees:

MATCH RULES

- 90 minutes.
- 30 minutes of extra-time if necessary.
- Penalty shoot-out if scores still level.
- Five named substitutes
- Maximum of three substitutions.
