= Willy Guéret =

French footballer (born 1973)

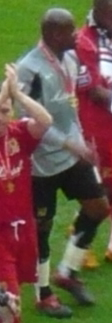
- Guéret after playing for Milton Keynes Dons in the 2008 Football League Trophy Final

Personal information
- Full name: Willy Julie Guéret
- Date of birth: 3 August 1973 (age 53)
- Place of birth: Saint-Claude, Guadeloupe, France
- Height: 1.85 m (6 ft 1 in)
- Position: Goalkeeper

Senior career*
Years	Team	Apps	(Gls)
1991–1995	Red Star 93	6	(0)
1996–2000	Le Mans	17	(0)
2000–2004	Millwall	15	(0)
2004–2007	Swansea City	132	(0)
2007–2011	Milton Keynes Dons	135	(0)
2011	Kettering Town	14	(0)
Total		319	(0)
- * Club domestic league appearances and goals

Willy Julie Guéret (born 3 August 1973) is a French former professional footballer who played as a goalkeeper.

== Career ==
Guéret was born in Saint-Claude, Guadeloupe. He joined Le Mans in 1996, playing alongside a young Didier Drogba, but moved to England on 28 July 2000 when he signed for Millwall. First-team opportunities were limited, however, and Guéret made only 18 starts for Millwall (with a further two as substitute) in all competitions. He was on the bench as Millwall lost the 2004 FA Cup final to Manchester United, and contributed to two games earlier in the cup run against Telford United and Burnley.

On 1 July 2004, Guéret signed for Swansea City. The club achieved promotion from League Two in his first season at Bury but Guéret's celebrations turned sour when the Swansea players entered the directors box against the orders of the game safety officer after the final whistle. Guéret and the other players were ordered by police to leave the directors box but Gueret was arrested for repeatedly telling a police officer to fuck off. Guéret was placed in a police van and taken to Bury police station where he was later released after being issued an £80 fixed penalty notice for disorder for an offence under s5 Public Order Act and was able to travel back from Greater Manchester to Swansea with his teammates. He expressed his wish to stay at the club until the end of his career. He would later go on to help Swansea win the 2006 Football League Trophy final.

However, having fallen out of favour at Swansea, Guéret signed for MK Dons on the opening day of the 2007–08 season. He was hailed by Ray Mathias as the best goalkeeper in League Two and would go on to win the Golden Glove that season, keeping 23 clean sheets in 52 games.

Guéret saved a penalty in the 2008 Football League Trophy final, in which MK Dons beat Grimsby Town 2–0 at Wembley Stadium.

On 1 February 2011, Guéret signed for Kettering Town after leaving the Dons by mutual consent.

After six months at Kettering, Guéret announced his retirement from football. He was offered a coaching role with the MK Dons Academy but chose to return to France to set up a cognac production company with his brother at Gimeux in southern France.

== Honours ==
Millwall

- Football League Second Division: 2000–01
- FA Cup runner-up: 2003–04

Swansea City

- Football League Two third-place promotion: 2004–05
- Football League Trophy: 2005–06

Milton Keynes Dons

- Football League Two: 2007–08
- Football League Trophy: 2007–08

Individual

- Football League Golden Glove: 2007–08 Football League Two
