= Nick Hegarty =

English footballer and manager (born 1986)

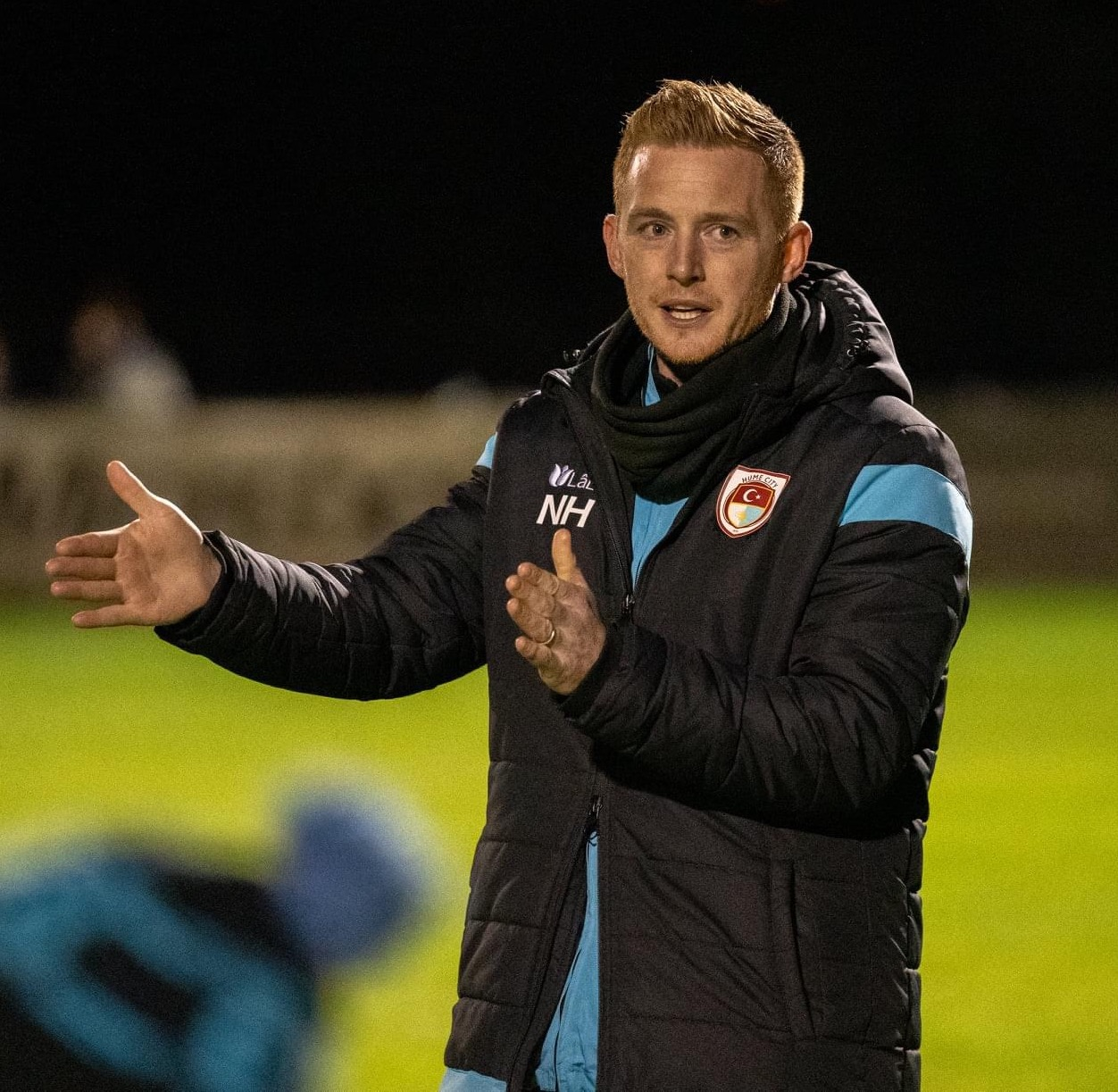
- Hegarty manager of Hume City in 2021.

Personal information
- Full name: Nicholas Ian Hegarty
- Date of birth: 25 June 1986 (age 40)
- Place of birth: Wakefield, England
- Height: 5 ft 10 in (1.78 m)
- Position: Midfielder

Team information
- Current team: Hume City (Head Coach)

Youth career
- 1997–2000: Nottingham Forest
- 2000–2002: Sheffield Wednesday
- 2002–2003: Glasshoughton Welfare
- 2003–2004: Grimsby Town

Senior career*
Years	Team	Apps	(Gls)
2004–2010	Grimsby Town	105	(9)
2005	→ Whitby Town (loan)	3	(0)
2006	→ Willenhall Town (loan)	8	(0)
2007	→ York City (loan)	2	(0)
2010–2011	St Mirren	3	(0)
2011	Mansfield Town	2	(0)
2012–2018	Hume City	172	(52)
Total		295	(61)

Managerial career
- 2017–2022: Hume City
- 2025–: Hume City
- * Club domestic league appearances and goals as of 1 July 2021

Nicholas Ian Hegarty (born 25 June 1986) is an English football manager and former professional footballer, he is head coach of Hume City

As a player he was a midfielder who played between 2004 and 2018. He had spells with Grimsby Town, Whitby Town, Willenhall Town, York City, St Mirren and Mansfield Town, finishing his career with Hume City after emigrating to Australia. Following retirement he became manager of Hume and remained with the club for a further five years.

== Career ==
=== Grimsby Town ===
Born in Wakefield, West Yorkshire, Hegarty started his career at Nottingham Forest. and Sheffield Wednesday as a junior before being released. He signed for Grimsby Town in 2001 on youth scholarship deal. He was part of the youth setup managed by former Grimsby and Middlesbrough forward Paul Wilkinson that featured the likes of Cameron Jerome. Hegarty progressed at youth level until towards the end of the 2003–2004 season when he was added to the first team squad soon after the sacking of manager Paul Groves. However, he would have to wait until over a year later until he would make his first team debut, coming on as a late substitute for Andy Parkinson in a 4–1 away victory against Kidderminster Harriers on the final away game of the 2004–05 season. Hegarty continued to be a regular for the reserves in that season and scored a hat-trick in the home match against Lincoln City. Despite a good pre-season for Russell Slade's Town side, he spent most of the 2005–06 season as a fringe player, and was loaned out to Non-League clubs Whitby Town and Willenhall Town. Hegarty was to play a number of games in the 2006–07 season and became more involved in the first team under the tenure of Alan Buckley and his performances would eventually see him awarded a new two-year deal in the summer of 2007. Despite featuring more often in the first team Buckley placed Hegarty on the loan list and he went on to briefly join York City on a month's loan in September 2007, however he was to suffer a muscle strain which limited him to making two appearances during this spell. In the 2008–2009 season, Hegarty went on to feature heavily under Mike Newell and was Newell's preferred left winger, except for a two-month period when the club succeeded in loaning Stuart Elliott from Doncaster Rovers. His performances by the end of the 08–09 season had generally improved and his good form drew praise from several opposition managers which coincided with the Mariners' late surge to safety. In 09–10 season under Neil Woods Hegarty struggled to break into the first team, and suffered from several injuries. On 12 May 2010, Hegarty was one of seven players placed on the transfer list by Woods after their relegation from the English Football League.

=== St Mirren ===
On 18 August 2010 Hegarty joined St Mirren on trial, Hegarty signed for the club on 31 August 2010, penning a one-year contract. Hegarty's 3rd Scottish Premier League appearance was brief after leaving the field with a broken ankle. Following the conclusion of an injury hit season Hegarty was amongst ten players released.

=== Mansfield Town ===
Upon his release Hegarty trained with Bradford City, before later joining Mansfield Town on trial. He later re-joined Mansfield on trial in late October 2011 with a view to once again earning a contract, signing the following day on a two-month deal. He made two league appearances for the club before being released in December 2011.

=== Hume City ===
Nick signed for Hume City for the 2012 season in Australia. In his first season with Hume, Hegarty won the Football Federation Victoria Gold Medal award, given to the best player of the Victorian Premier League. From January 2014, Nick Hegarty was appointed captain of the club. In 2016, Hegarty became just the seventh player to win the Gold Medal a second time. Hegarty polled 38 votes to win by seven from Avondale FC's Massimo Murdocca on 31.

== Coaching career ==
Hegarty became the senior head coach of Hume City late in 2017 after hanging up the boots that same year. Hegarty resigned from Hume on 10 April 2022, following a poor run of results. He was due to leave the club anyway due to an impending move back to the United Kingdom.

On 23 July 2022, Hegarty joined Huddersfield Town as a women's team coach.

In August 2023, Hegarty announced on his Twitter account that he had returned to Grimsby Town as a youth team coach for the club's under-16's team.

== Career statistics ==
Appearances and goals by club, season and competition
Club	Season	League			FA Cup		League Cup		Other		Total	
Club	Season	Division	Apps	Goals	Apps	Goals	Apps	Goals	Apps	Goals	Apps	Goals
Grimsby Town	2004–05	League Two	1	0	0	0	0	0	0	0	1	0
Grimsby Town	2005–06	League Two	2	0	0	0	0	0	1 (Note: Appearance(s) in Football League Trophy)	0	3	0
Grimsby Town	2006–07	League Two	15	0	2	0	0	0	2	0	19	0
Grimsby Town	2007–08	League Two	30	4	2	0	0	0	5	0	37	4
Grimsby Town	2008–09	League Two	35	4	0	0	1	0	2	1	38	5
Grimsby Town	2009–10	League Two	9	0	0	0	1	0	0	0	10	0
Grimsby Town	Total		92	8	4	0	2	0	10	1	108	9
Whitby Town (loan)	2005–06	NPL Premier Division	3	0	0	0	0	0	0	0	3	0
Willenhall Town (loan)	2005–06	NPL Division One South	8	0	0	0	0	0	0	0	8	0
York City (loan)	2007–08	Conference Premier	2	0	0	0	0	0	0	0	2	0
St Mirren	2010–11	Scottish Premier League	3	0	0	0	0	0	0	0	3	0
Mansfield Town	2011–12	Conference Premier	2	0	0	0	0	0	0	0	2	0
Career total			110	8	4	0	2	0	10	1	126	9

=== Managerial statistics ===
Managerial record by team and tenure
Team	From	To	Record				
Team	From	To	P	W	D	L	Win %
Hume City	July 2017	April 2022	104	50	21	33	48.1
Total			104	50	21	33	48.1

== Honours ==
Grimsby Town

- Football League Trophy runner-up: 2007–08
