= 2010–11 St Mirren F.C. season =

St Mirren
2010–11 season
- Chairman: Stewart Gilmour
- Manager: Danny Lennon
- Stadium: St Mirren Park
- SPL: 11th
- Scottish Cup: Quarter Finals lost to Aberdeen
- League Cup: Second round lost to Ross County
- Top goalscorer: League: Michael Higdon (13); All: Michael Higdon (14)
- Highest home attendance: 6,118 vs Kilmarnock (3 January 2011)
- Lowest home attendance: 2,701 vs St Johnstone (11 December 2010)
- Average home league attendance: 4,450
Home colours	Away colours

St Mirren are competing in their fifth successive season in the Scottish Premier League after finishing in tenth place for season 2009–10. The most notable change at the club during the close season was the replacement of both manager Gus MacPherson and assistant manager Andy Millen after 7 seasons of managing the club. This was the longest period any manager had spent in charge of the club since the 1950s and at the time of MacPherson's sacking he was the longest serving manager of a Scottish League Club. They were replaced by the former Cowdenbeath management partnership of Danny Lennon and Iain Jenkins.

St Mirren started the SPL campaign with a home fixture against the 2010 Scottish Cup holders, Dundee United at St Mirren Park on 14 August 2010.

== Transfers ==
Manager Danny Lennon has been active in signing new players during the close season after 9 players left the club over the summer. Lennon recruited many players from Scotland's Division 1 and 2 including the acquisition of 4 players from his former club, Cowdenbeath. 2 former players, David Van Zanten and Marc McAusland also rejoined St Mirren.

The most notable departures from the club were that of first team regulars, Andy Dorman, Billy Mehmet and vice-captain Jack Ross after their contracts expired.

Influential Welsh international midfielder Andy Dorman has moved to English Championship side Crystal Palace, managed by the former Scotland boss George Burley. Dorman had spent two and a half years in Paisley, during which time he won his first international cap against Croatia and was joint top goalscorer in his first full season at the club.

Billy Mehmet moved to Gençlerbirliği S.K. in the Turkish Süper Lig. Mehmet was St Mirren's top scorer in all competitions during the 2009–10 season with 12 goals, most having been scored in cup competitions, including the winning goal versus Heart of Midlothian in the League Cup semi-final.

Jack Ross left the club having spent the latter part of the season out with an ankle injury and joined SPL rivals Hamilton Academical.

=== In ===
Date	Player	From	Fee	Source
1 July 2010	David Van Zanten	Hamilton Academical	Free Transfer	BBC Sport
1 July 2010	Darren McGregor	Cowdenbeath	Free Transfer	BBC Sport
1 July 2010	Paul McQuade	Cowdenbeath	Free Transfer	BBC Sport
1 July 2010	Peter Bradley	Cowdenbeath	Undisclosed Fee	BBC Sport
13 July 2010	Craig Samson	Ayr United	Free Transfer	BBC Sport
14 July 2010	Gareth Wardlaw	Cowdenbeath	Nominal Fee	BBC Sport
16 July 2010	Marc McAusland	Queen of the South	Free Transfer	BBC Sport
27 July 2010	Sean Lynch	Falkirk	Free Transfer	BBC Sport
31 August 2010	Nick Hegarty	Grimsby Town	Free Transfer	BBC Sport
25 September 2010	Jamie McCluskey	Wrexham	Free Transfer	BBC Sport
1 October 2010	Patrick Cregg	Hibernian	Free Transfer	BBC Sport
22 October 2010	Aaron Mooy	Bolton Wanderers	Undisclosed Fee	St Mirren F.C. Official Website

=== Out ===
Date	Player	To	Fee	Source
1 July 2010	Billy Mehmet	Gençlerbirliği S.K.	Free (End of Contract)	BBC Sport
1 July 2010	Tom Brighton	Unattached	Released	BBC
1 July 2010	Chris Innes	Inverness C.T.	Free (End of Contract)	BBC Sport
1 July 2010	Jack Ross	Hamilton	Free (End of Contract)	BBC Sport
1 July 2010	Stephen O'Donnell	Dundee	Free (End of Contract)	BBC Sport
1 July 2010	Andy Dorman	Crystal Palace	Free (End of Contract)	BBC Sport
1 July 2010	Allan Johnston	Queen of the South	Free (End of Contract)	BBC Sport
1 July 2010	Graham Carey	Celtic	Loan Ends	BBC Sport
1 July 2010	Rory Loy	Rangers	Loan Ends	BBC Sport
8 July 2010	Chris Smith	Dunfermline Athletic	Free Transfer	BBC Sport
13 July 2010	Mark Howard	Aberdeen	Free Transfer	BBC Sport

=== Loan In ===
Date	Player	From	Length	Source
12 July 2010	Jure Travner	Watford	Season	BBC Sport
27 July 2010	Paul McGowan	Celtic	Season	BBC Sport

=== Loan Out ===
Date	Player	To	Length	Source
30 July 2010	Jon McShane	Dumbarton	5 Months	St Mirren Club Website

== Results ==
=== Scottish Premier League ===
14 August 2010 SPL Round 1	St Mirren	1–1	Dundee United	St Mirren Park, Paisley
	Lynch 73'	BBC Sport	Daly 89'	Attendance: 5,618; Referee: Brian Winter

22 August 2010 SPL Round 2	Celtic	4–0	St Mirren	Celtic Park, Glasgow
	Ledley 5'; Maloney 23'; Forrest 69'; Ki 81'	BBC Sport		Attendance: 46,812; Referee: Euan Norris

29 August 2010 SPL Round 3	St Mirren	1–0	Hibernian	St Mirren Park, Paisley
	Dargo 58'	BBC Sport		Attendance: 4,480; Referee: Stevie O'Reilly

11 September 2010 SPL Round 4	Kilmarnock	2–1	St Mirren	Rugby Park, Kilmarnock
	Dayton 29'; Eremenko 56'	BBC Sport	Thomson 48'; McGowan (red card) 63'	Attendance: 6,064; Referee: Steven McLean

18 September 2010 SPL Round 5	St Johnstone	2–1	St Mirren	McDiarmid Park, Perth
	Jackson 3'; Parkin 33'	BBC Sport	Lynch 37'	Attendance: 3,349; Referee: John McKendrick

25 September 2010 SPL Round 6	St Mirren	1–2	Inverness CT	St Mirren Park, Paisley
	McGowan 77'	BBC Sport	Odhiambo 45', 50'	Attendance: 3,954; Referee: Stephen Finnie

2 October 2010 SPL Round 7	Motherwell	3–1	St Mirren	Fir Park, Motherwell
	Humphrey 3'; Hateley 87' (pen.); Murphy 88'	BBC Sport	Wardlaw 64'	Attendance: 4,384; Referee: Iain Brines

16 October 2010 SPL Round 8	St Mirren	2–2	Hamilton Academical	St Mirren Park, Paisley
	Higdon 60', 73'	BBC Sport	Routledge 39'; Imrie 47'	Attendance: 3,577; Referee: William Collum

23 October 2010 SPL Round 9	Heart of Midlothian	3–0	St Mirren	Tynecastle Stadium, Edinburgh
	Skácel 2', 24', 90'	BBC Sport		Attendance: 12,009; Referee: Calum Murray

30 October 2010 SPL Round 10	St Mirren	2–1	Aberdeen	St Mirren Park, Paisley
	McAusland 28'; Travner 90'	BBC Sport	McArdle 57'	Attendance: 4,589; Referee: Crawford Allan

7 November 2010 SPL Round 11	St Mirren	1–3	Rangers	St Mirren Park, Paisley
	Higdon 76' (pen.)	BBC Sport	McAusland 48' (o.g.); Naismith 58'; Miller 68'	Attendance: 5,674; Referee: Craig Thomson

10 November 2010 SPL Round 12	Dundee United	1–2	St Mirren	Tannadice Park, Dundee
	Buaben 86'	BBC Sport	Higdon 41', 65'	Attendance: 5,548; Referee: Euan Norris

14 November 2010 SPL Round 13	St Mirren	0–1	Celtic	St Mirren Park, Paisley
		BBC Sport	Hooper 90'	Attendance: 6,073; Referee: Iain Brines

20 November 2010 SPL Round 14	St Mirren	1–1	Motherwell	St Mirren Park, Paisley
	Wardlaw 37'	BBC Sport	Blackman 74'	Attendance: 4,213; Referee: Alan Muir

27 November 2010 SPL Round 15	Hamilton Academical	0–0	St Mirren	New Douglas Park, Hamilton
		BBC Sport		Attendance: 2,280; Referee: Meir Levy (Israel)

11 December 2010 SPL Round 17	St Mirren	1–2	St Johnstone	St Mirren Park, Paisley
	Higdon 62'	BBC Sport	Parkin 53'; Craig 90'	Attendance: 2,701; Referee: Stephen Finnie

26 December 2010 SPL Round 19	Inverness CT	1–2	St Mirren	Caledonian Stadium, Inverness
	Cox 8'	BBC Sport	Thomson 44', 85'	Attendance: 3,819; Referee: Craig Thomson

29 December 2010 SPL Round 20	St Mirren	0–2	Heart of Midlothian	St Mirren Park, Paisley
	Potter (red card) 81'	BBC Sport	Templeton 63'; Kyle 82' (pen.)	Attendance: 4,599; Referee: Crawford Allan

3 January 2011 SPL Round 21	St Mirren	0–2	Kilmarnock	St Mirren Park, Paisley
		BBC Sport	Kelly 64'; Bryson 79'	Attendance: 6,118; Referee: Brian Winter

15 January 2011 SPL Round 22	Aberdeen	2–0	St Mirren	Pittodrie Stadium, Aberdeen
	Vernon 50', 67'	BBC Sport		Attendance: 9,740; Referee: Calum Murray

22 January 2011 SPL Round 23	St Johnstone	0–0	St Mirren	McDiarmid Park, Perth
		BBC Sport		Attendance: 3,009; Referee: William Collum

26 January 2011 SPL Round 24	St Mirren	1–1	Dundee United	St Mirren Park, Paisley
	McGregor 38'	BBC Sport	D.Robertson 88'	Attendance: 3,095; Referee: Craig Thomson

2 February 2011 SPL Round 16 (Re-arranged)	Hibernian	2–0	St Mirren	Easter Road, Edinburgh
	Riordan 63'; Wotherspoon 90'	BBC Sport		Attendance: 9,436; Referee: Mike Tumilty

12 February 2011 SPL Round 26	St Mirren	3–3	Inverness CT	St Mirren Park, Paisley
	Higdon 28' (pen.); Thomson 29'; McGregor 74'	BBC Sport	Rooney 6', 61'; Doran 33'	Attendance: 3,203; Referee: Bobby Madden

20 February 2011 SPL Round 27	St Mirren	0–1	Hibernian	St Mirren Park, Paisley
		BBC Sport	Dickoh 87'	Attendance: 3,505; Referee: Euan Norris

23 February 2011 SPL Round 25 (Re-arranged)	Motherwell	0–1	St Mirren	Fir Park, Motherwell
		BBC Sport	Higdon 82'	Attendance: 3,613; Referee: Steve Conroy

26 February 2011 SPL Round 28	Kilmarnock	2–0	St Mirren	Rugby Park, Kilmarnock
	Gros 13'; Eremenko 29'	BBC Sport		Attendance: 5,243; Referee: Calum Murray

6 March 2011 SPL Round 29	St Mirren	0–1	Rangers	St Mirren Park, Paisley
		BBC Sport	Bartley 24'	Attendance: 5,405; Referee: William Collum

19 March 2011 SPL Round 30	Heart of Midlothian	3–2	St Mirren	Tynecastle Stadium, Edinburgh
	Skácel 55', 90'; Stevenson 82'	BBC Sport	Higdon 15', 69'	Attendance: 12,763; Referee: Stephen Finnie

2 April 2011 SPL Round 31	St Mirren	3–1	Hamilton Academical	St Mirren Park, Paisley
	Higdon 61', 64' (pen.), 71'	BBC Sport	Buchanan 43'	Attendance: 4,985; Referee: William Collum

6 April 2011 SPL Round 33 (Re-arranged)	St Mirren	3–2	Aberdeen	St Mirren Park, Paisley
	Higdon 6'; Dargo 57'; Thomson 68'	BBC Sport	Murray 47' (o.g.); Milsom 90'	Attendance: 3,489; Referee: George Salmond

9 April 2011 SPL Round 32	Celtic	1–0	St Mirren	Celtic Park, Glasgow
	Commons 78'	BBC Sport		Attendance: 50,318; Referee: Calum Murray

16 April 2011 SPL Round 18 (Re-arranged)	Rangers	2–1	St Mirren	Ibrox Stadium, Glasgow
	Papac 33'; Whittaker 52' (pen.)	BBC Sport	McGregor 38'	Attendance: 46,392; Referee: Euan Norris

24 April 2011 SPL Round 34	Hibernian	1–1	St Mirren	Easter Road, Edinburgh
	Sodje 26'	BBC Sport	Dargo 39' (pen.)	Attendance: 7,238; Referee: Alan Muir

2 May 2011 SPL Round 35	St Mirren	0–1	Hamilton Academical	St Mirren Park, Paisley
	Travner (yellow card) 24' (red card)	BBC Sport	Antoine-Curier 74'; Neil (yellow card) 80' (red card)	Attendance: 5,037; Referee: Craig Thomson

7 May 2011 SPL Round 36	Inverness CT	1–0	St Mirren	Caledonian Stadium, Inverness
	Duncan (red card) 71'; Rooney 85'	BBC Sport		Attendance: 3,446; Referee: Bobby Madden

10 May 2011 SPL Round 37	Aberdeen	0–1	St Mirren	Pittodrie Stadium, Aberdeen
		BBC Sport	Wardlaw 65'	Attendance: 5,955; Referee: Euan Norris

14 May 2011 SPL Round 38	St Mirren	0–0	St Johnstone	St Mirren Park, Paisley
		BBC Sport		Attendance: 4,230; Referee: Calum Murray

=== Scottish Cup ===
8 January 2011 Scottish Cup round 4	St Mirren	0–0	Peterhead	St Mirren Park, Paisley
		BBC Sport		Attendance: 2,312; Referee: John McKendrick

18 January 2011 Scottish Cup round 4 replay	Peterhead	1–6	St Mirren	Balmoor, Peterhead
	Sharp 89'	BBC Sport	McGowan 22', 33', 46'; Mooy 31'; McQuade 45', 56'	Attendance: 1,610; Referee: John McKendrick

5 February 2011 Scottish Cup round 5	Ayr United	1–2	St Mirren	Somerset Park, Ayr
	Roberts 58' (pen.)	BBC Sport	Dargo 7', 45'	Attendance: 5,997; Referee: Euan Norris

12 March 2011 Scottish Cup Quarter-final	St Mirren	1–1	Aberdeen	St Mirren Park, Paisley
	McGowan 77'	BBC Sport	McArdle 90'	Attendance: 4,120; Referee: Euan Norris

16 March 2011 Scottish Cup Quarter-final Replay	Aberdeen	2–1	St Mirren	Pittodrie Stadium, Aberdeen
	Maguire 4'; Vernon 44'	BBC Sport	Vujadinović 87' (o.g.)	Attendance: 7,330; Referee: Craig Thomson

=== Scottish League Cup ===
25 August 2010 Co-Operative Insurance Cup round 2	Ross County	3–3 (a.e.t.)	St Mirren	Victoria Park, Dingwall
	Gardyne 69'; Brittain 78'; Craig 95'	BBC Sport	McGregor 44'; Higdon 79'; McGowan 92'	Attendance: 1,239; Referee: Mike Tumilty

=== Friendlies ===
14 July 2010 Friendly Match	Ayr United	1–3	St Mirren	Somerset Park, Ayr
	Rodgers 35'	St Mirren Official Club Website	Higdon 5'; Trialist 75'; Potter 89'	Attendance: 625

19 July 2010 Friendly Match	Dumbarton	2–2	St Mirren	Strathclyde Homes Stadium, Dumbarton
	Carcary 36', 72'	St Mirren Official Club Website	Robb 20'; Higdon 63' (pen.)	Attendance: 953; Referee: Iain Brines

21 July 2010 Friendly Match	Brechin City	2–2	St Mirren	Glebe Park, Brechin
	McAllister; Paul McLean	St Mirren Official Club Website	Robb; Love	Referee: William Collum

27 July 2010 Renfrewshire Cup Final 2010	Greenock Morton	0–0 (3–4) pen.	St Mirren	Cappielow, Greenock
	Holmes (penalty missed); Monti (penalty scored); Kelbie (penalty missed); Tidser (penalty scored); Smyth (penalty scored)	St Mirren Official Club Website	Higdon (penalty scored); Van Zanten (penalty missed); Brady (penalty scored); McGowan (penalty scored); Potter (penalty scored)	Attendance: 3,422; Referee: Stevie O'Reilly

31 July 2010 Friendly Match	Ballymena United	0–2	St Mirren	Ballymena Showgrounds, Ballymena
		St Mirren Official Club Website	McQuade; Dargo

2 August 2010 Friendly Match	Crusaders	2–1	St Mirren	Seaview, Belfast
	Dallas; Murray (o.g.)	St Mirren Official Club Website	Dargo

3 August 2010 Friendly Match	Derry City	1–1	St Mirren	Brandywell Stadium, Derry
	Lafferty	St Mirren Official Club Website	Dargo

4 May 2011 Renfrewshire Cup Semi-final 2011	St Mirren	9–1	Gourock Thistle	St Mirren Park, Paisley
	Hegarty; Mooy; Cregg (pen.); Barron; McKernon, 52' (pen.); Reilly; Coyne,	St Mirren Official Club Website	McGregor	Referee: Davie Nicol

== Competitions ==
=== Overall ===
Competition	Started round	Final position / round	First match	Last match
Scottish Premier League	Round 1	11th Place	14 August 2010	14 May 2011
League Cup	Round 2	Round 2	24 August 2010	24 August 2010
Scottish Cup	Round 4	Quarter-final	8 January 2011	16 March 2011

Source: Competitions

=== SPL ===
==== Classification ====
Pos	Team	Pld	W	D	L	GF	GA	GD	Pts	Qualification or relegation
8	St Johnstone	38	11	11	16	23	43	−20	44	
9	Aberdeen	38	11	5	22	39	59	−20	38	
10	Hibernian	38	10	7	21	39	61	−22	37	
11	St Mirren	38	8	9	21	33	57	−24	33	
12	Hamilton Academical (R)	38	5	11	22	24	59	−35	26	Relegation to the First Division

Source: SPFL Archive
Rules for classification: 1) points; 2) goal difference; 3) number of goals scored.
(R) Relegated

==== Results by round ====
Round	1	2	3	4	5	6	7	8	9	10	11	12	13	14	15	16	17	18	19	20	21	22	23	24	25	26	27	28	29	30	31	32	33	34	35	36	37	38
Ground	H	A	H	A	A	H	A	H	A	H	H	A	H	H	A	A	H	A	A	H	H	A	A	H	A	H	H	A	H	A	H	A	H	A	H	A	A	H
Result	D	L	W	L	L	L	L	D	L	W	L	W	L	D	D	L	L	L	W	L	L	L	D	D	W	D	L	L	L	L	W	L	W	D	L	L	W	D

Source: BBC Sport
A = Away; H = Home; W = Win; D = Draw; L = Loss

== See also ==
- List of St Mirren F.C. seasons
