= Matthew Bird =

English footballer (born 1990)

Personal information
- Full name: Louis Matthew Bird
- Date of birth: 31 October 1990 (age 35)
- Place of birth: Grimsby, England
- Height: 6 ft 0 in (1.83 m)
- Position: Defender

Youth career
- Grimsby Town

Senior career*
Years	Team	Apps	(Gls)
2008–2010	Grimsby Town	2	(0)
2009	→ Frickley Athletic (loan)	5	(0)
2009–2010	→ Frickley Athletic (loan)	2	(0)
2010	→ Boston United (loan)	5	(0)
2010	Frickley Athletic		
2010–2011	Goole		
- * Club domestic league appearances and goals as of 11:18, 19 December 2009 (UTC)

Louis Matthew Bird (born 31 October 1990) is an English former professional footballer who played as a defender from 2008 to 2011.

He played in the Football League for Grimsby Town, as well as playing for Frickley Athletic and Boston United on loan.

== Career ==
=== Grimsby Town ===
Bird came through the youth team Grimsby Town. He was invited to trial with Manchester United in January 2008 but this was cut short due to a recurring knee injury. Bird signed his first professional contract in March 2008, tying him to Grimsby Town until 2010, with youth team coach Neil Woods saying, "He's got great potential. He's 6ft 1in, left-footed, got good pace, and I think that it's the right move at this time for Matthew and for us." He made his first-team debut as a substitute in a 0–1 defeat to Rotherham United in April 2008. Bird played no part in the 2008–2009 season, failing to even make the subs bench under Alan Buckley and his replacement Mike Newell

After failing to make a single first team appearance in little under two years, Bird was loaned too Frickley Athletic on 5 November 2009. Bird returned to Blundell Park a month later on 5 December, but returned to Frickley again for a second spell on the 21st. Bird signed for Boston United on loan in March 2010. Whilst in his month loan spell with United, he helped them to promotion from the Unibond Premier League via the play-offs to ensure Boston United play football in the Conference North next season.

=== Non League ===
Bird was released by Grimsby Town on 12 May 2010. He re-joined Frickley Athletic ahead of the 2010–2011 season. In October 2010 he joined Goole. He left Goole in January 2011 after suffering an injury that had kept him on the sidelines since October.

== Honours ==
=== Grimsby Town ===
- Football League Trophy runner up: 2007–08

=== Boston United ===
- Northern Premier League Premier Division play-off winners: 2009–10

== Career statistics ==
Appearances and goals by club, season and competition
Club	Season	League			FA Cup		League Cup		Other		Total	
Club	Season	Division	Apps	Goals	Apps	Goals	Apps	Goals	Apps	Goals	Apps	Goals
Grimsby Town	2007–08	League Two	2	0	0	0	0	0	0	0	2	0
Grimsby Town	2008–09	League Two	0	0	0	0	0	0	0	0	0	0
Grimsby Town	2009–10	League Two	0	0	0	0	0	0	0	0	0	0
Grimsby Town	Total		2	0	0	0	0	0	0	0	2	0
Frickley Athletic (loan)	2009–10	NPL Premier Division	7	0	0	0	—		0	0	7	0
Boston United (loan)	2009–10	NPL Premier Division	5	0	0	0	—		0	0	5	0
Career total			14	0	0	0	0	0	0	0	14	0
