= Gary Montgomery (sportsman) =

English footballer and cricketer

Personal information
- Full name: Gary Stephen Montgomery
- Date of birth: 8 October 1982 (age 44)
- Place of birth: Leamington Spa, Warwickshire, England
- Position: Goalkeeper

Youth career
- Coventry City

Senior career*
Years	Team	Apps	(Gls)
1999–2003	Coventry City	8	(0)
2002	→ Crewe Alexandra (loan)	0	(0)
2002	→ Kidderminster Harriers (loan)	2	(0)
2003–2007	Rotherham United	35	(0)
2007–2009	Grimsby Town	5	(0)
2010	Boston United	0	(0)
Total		50	(0)
- * Club domestic league appearances and goals

Gary Stephen Montgomery (born 8 October 1982) is an English former professional footballer and cricketer.

As a footballer he played as a goalkeeper from 1999 to 2010 for Coventry City, Crewe Alexandra, Kidderminster Harriers, Rotherham United, Grimsby Town and Boston United. In 2010, he switched sports to cricket and made three List A cricket appearances as a professional playing for Lancashire County Cricket Club.

== Football career ==
Montgomery was promoted from the youth team ranks at Coventry City during the 1999–2000 season. He was part of the same impressive youth team that boasted fellow keeper Chris Kirkland. While at Coventry, Gary spent time on loan with Crewe Alexandra and Kidderminster Harriers. Montgomery signed for Rotherham United in the summer of 2003 as a young understudy for Mike Pollitt. Montgomery made his debut for Rotherham as a late substitute against Crystal Palace, coming on after Pollitt had been sent off for handball outside of his area. His second appearance came 10 days later in similar and dramatic circumstances; Rotherham were playing Arsenal in the League Cup at Highbury when Pollitt was sent off again in extra time. Montgomery came on and the game went to penalties. He saved efforts from Sylvain Wiltord and Quincy Owusu-Abeyie, and even scored a penalty himself, however Arsenal ultimately triumphed 9–8 on spot kicks. He remained with the club until being released at the end of the 2006–07 season. His next port of call was to join with Grimsby Town F.C. at the start of the 2007–08 campaign as understudy to Phil Barnes, after his first season, he went on to sign a new one deal at Blundell Park for the season. On 17 March 2009, Montgomery along with Phil Barnes and Tom Newey were released by the club after they were told they were no longer needed and agreed to leave the club by mutual consent.

Montgomery briefly returned to football during the 2010–11 season with Conference North side Boston United, but left the club in December 2010.

== Cricket career ==
In the 2009, Gary switched sports from football to cricket. Montgomery appeared several times for Lancashire County Cricket Club 2nd Eleven, and signed a professional contract for the 2010 season. He played three matches for Lancashire in the Clydesdale Bank 40 competition. He was released at the end of the 2010 season.

== Honours ==
Grimsby Town

- Football League Trophy runner-up: 2007–08
