= Milton Keynes Dons F.C. =

Football club in Milton Keynes, England

Milton Keynes Dons
- Full name: Milton Keynes Dons Football Club
- Nickname: The Dons
- Short name: MK Dons
- Founded: 21 June 2004; 22 years ago (Note: In terms of its footballing assets and place in the English football league structure, Milton Keynes Dons F.C. is the continuation of Wimbledon F.C., which was formed in south London in 1889 and relocated to Milton Keynes in 2003. The club was brought out of administration in 2004 as a new company, Milton Keynes Dons Ltd, which purchased the assets of The Wimbledon Football Club Ltd and received the team's place in Football League One. The Wimbledon Football Club Ltd legally endured until 2009. Since 2006 Milton Keynes Dons has officially considered itself a new club, formed in 2004—it no longer claims any history before then, despite retaining Wimbledon F.C.'s "Dons" nickname.)
- Ground: Stadium MK
- Capacity: 30,500
- Chairman: Fahad Al-Ghanim
- Head coach: Paul Warne
- League: EFL League One
- 2025–26: EFL League Two, 2nd of 24 (promoted)
- Website: mkdons.com
Home colours	Away colours	Third colours

Milton Keynes Dons Football Club, usually abbreviated to MK Dons, is a professional association football club based in Milton Keynes, Buckinghamshire, England. The club competes in EFL League One, the third tier of English football, following promotion from EFL League Two in the 2025–26 season. The club was founded in 2004, following Wimbledon F.C.'s controversial relocation to Milton Keynes from south London, when it adopted its present name, badge and home colours. (Note: The club abandoned its claim to any history before 2004 in October 2006 as part of an agreement with the Football Supporters' Federation, which had previously boycotted the team and its supporters' groups. Under this deal Milton Keynes Dons transferred Wimbledon F.C.'s trophies and other patrimony to Merton Council in south London in 2007.)

Initially based at the National Hockey Stadium, the club competed as Milton Keynes Dons from the start of the 2004–05 season. The club moved to their current ground, Stadium MK, for the 2007–08 season, in which they won the League Two title and the Football League Trophy. After seven further seasons in League One, the club won promotion to the Championship in 2015 under the management of Karl Robinson; however, they were relegated back to League One after one season.

Milton Keynes Dons have built a reputation for youth development, run 16 disability teams and their football trust engages around 60,000 people; between 2012 and 2013 the club produced 11 young players who have been called into age group national teams and between 2004 and 2014 the club also gave first-team debuts to 14 local academy graduates, including the England international midfielder Dele Alli.

The club also operates a women's team, Milton Keynes Dons Women, who groundshare Stadium MK with their male counterparts, and currently play in the third tier of the English women's football pyramid.

== Origins ==
Locations of Plough Lane, Selhurst Park and Milton Keynes

Milton Keynes, about 45 miles (72 km) north-west of London in Buckinghamshire, was established as a new town in 1967. In the absence of a professional football club representing the town—none of the local non-league teams progressed significantly through the English football league system or "pyramid" over the following decades—it was occasionally suggested that a Football League club might relocate there. There was no precedent in English league football for such a move between conurbations and the football authorities and most fans expressed strong opposition to the idea. Charlton Athletic briefly mooted moving to "a progressive Midlands borough" during a planning dispute with their local council in 1973, and the relocation of nearby Luton Town to Milton Keynes was repeatedly suggested from the 1980s onwards. Another team linked with the new town was Wimbledon Football Club.

Wimbledon, established in south London in 1889 and nicknamed "the Dons", were elected to the Football League in 1977. They thereafter went through a "fairytale" rise from obscurity and by the end of the 1980s were established in the top division of English football, as well as winning the 1988 FA Cup final. Despite Wimbledon's new prominence, the club's modest home stadium at Plough Lane remained largely unchanged from its non-league days. The club's then-owner Ron Noades identified this as a problem as early as 1979, extending his dissatisfaction to the ground's very location. Interested in the stadium site designated by the Milton Keynes Development Corporation, Noades briefly planned to move Wimbledon there by merging with a non-league club in Milton Keynes, and bought debt-ridden Milton Keynes City. However, Noades then decided that the club would not gain sufficient support in Milton Keynes and abandoned the idea.

In 1991, after the Taylor Report was published recommending the redevelopment of English football grounds, Wimbledon left Plough Lane to groundshare at Crystal Palace's ground, Selhurst Park, about 6 miles (9.7 km) away. Sam Hammam, who then owned Wimbledon, said the club could not afford to redevelop Plough Lane and that the groundshare was a temporary arrangement while a new ground was sourced in south-west London. A new stadium for Wimbledon proved difficult to achieve. Frustrated by what he perceived as a lack of support from Merton Council, Hammam began to look further afield and by 1996 was pursuing a move to Dublin, an idea that most Wimbledon fans strongly opposed. Hammam sold the club to two Norwegian businessmen, Kjell Inge Røkke and Bjørn Rune Gjelsten, in 1997, and a year later sold Plough Lane to Safeway supermarkets. Wimbledon were relegated from the Premier League at the end of the 1999–2000 season.

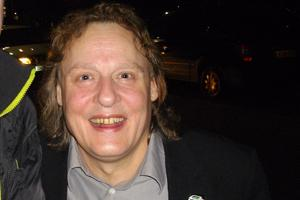
Pete Winkelman, in 2011

Starting in 1997, a consortium led by music promoter Pete Winkelman and supported by Asda and IKEA proposed a large retail development in Milton Keynes including a Football League-standard stadium. The consortium originally proposed that the stadium be located at the National Bowl but later altered their proposal to change the site of the proposed stadium to Denbigh North, the same site as the mooted retail development.

The consortium proposed that an established league club move to use this site; it approached Luton, Wimbledon, Crystal Palace, Barnet, and Queens Park Rangers. In 2001, Røkke and Gjelsten appointed a new chairman, Charles Koppel, who was in favour of this idea, saying it was necessary to stop the club going out of business. To the fury of most Wimbledon fans, Koppel announced on 2 August 2001 that the club intended to relocate to Milton Keynes. After the Football League refused permission, Wimbledon launched an appeal, leading to a Football Association arbitration hearing and subsequently the appointment of a three-man independent commission to make a final and binding verdict. The league and FA stated opposition but the commissioners ruled in favour, two to one, on 28 May 2002.

Having campaigned against the move, a group of disaffected Wimbledon fans reacted to this in June 2002 by forming their own non-league club, AFC Wimbledon, which most of the original team's support embraced. AFC Wimbledon entered a groundshare agreement with Kingstonian in the borough of Kingston upon Thames, adjacent to Merton. The original Wimbledon intended to move to Milton Keynes immediately but were unable to do so until a temporary home in the town meeting Football League criteria could be found. The club remained at Selhurst Park in the meantime and in June 2003 went into administration. With the move threatened and the club facing liquidation, Winkelman decided to buy it himself. He secured funding for the administrators to keep the team operating with the goal of getting it to Milton Keynes as soon as possible. The club arranged the temporary use of the National Hockey Stadium in Milton Keynes and played its first match there in September 2003. Nine months later, Winkelman's Inter MK Group bought the club out of administration and announced changes to its name, badge and colours—the team was renamed Milton Keynes Dons Football Club.

== History ==
=== 2004–2006: Struggles and relegation ===
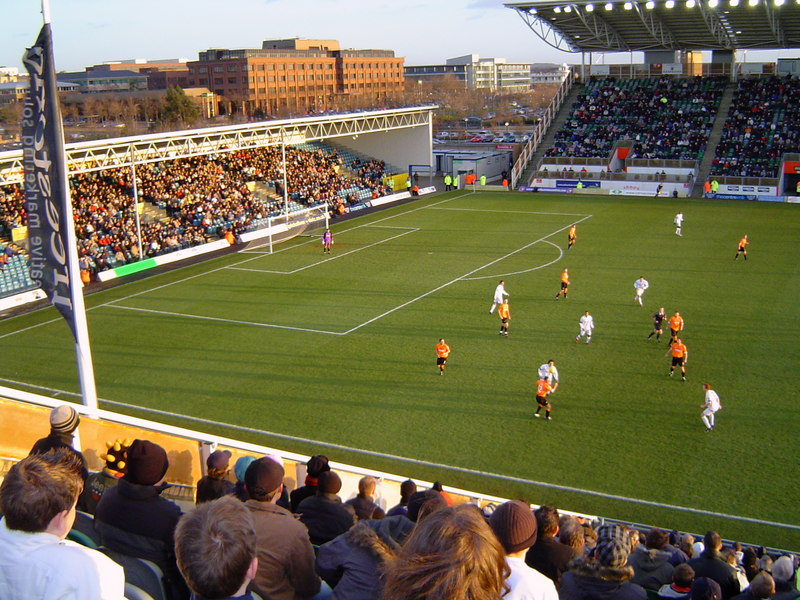
Milton Keynes Dons (white) take on Blackpool (tangerine) at the former England National Hockey Stadium during the 2004–05 season

The first season for the club as Milton Keynes Dons was 2004–05, in Football League One, under Stuart Murdoch, who had managed Wimbledon F.C. since 2002. The team's first game was on 7 August 2004, a 1–1 home draw against Barnsley, with Izale McLeod equalising with their first competitive goal. Murdoch was sacked in November and replaced by Danny Wilson, who kept Milton Keynes Dons in the division on the final day of the season — largely due to Wrexham's 10-point deduction for going into administration. The following season, Milton Keynes Dons struggled all year, and were relegated to League Two; Wilson, as a result, was sacked.

=== 2006–2010: Promotion and first silverware ===
Wilson's successor for 2006–07 was Martin Allen, who had just taken Brentford to the brink of a place in the Football League Championship. Milton Keynes Dons were in contention for automatic promotion right up to the last game of the season, but eventually finished fourth and had to settle for a play-off place. They then suffered a defeat to Shrewsbury Town in the play-off semi-finals. During the 2007 summer break, Allen left to take over at Leicester City.

For the 2007–08 season, former England captain Paul Ince took over as manager. Milton Keynes Dons reached the final of the Football League Trophy, while topping the table for most of the season. The final was played on 30 March 2008 against Grimsby Town — Milton Keynes Dons won 2–0 at Wembley to bring the first professional trophy to Milton Keynes. The club capped the trophy win with the League Two championship, and the subsequent promotion to League One. Following his successes, Ince left at the end of the season to manage Blackburn Rovers.

Ince's replacement was former Chelsea player Roberto Di Matteo, taking his first role as a manager. In the 2008–09 season, they missed out on an automatic promotion spot by two points, finishing third behind Peterborough United and Leicester City. They were knocked out of the play-offs by Scunthorpe United, who defeated MK Dons by penalty shootout at Stadium MK. Di Matteo left at the season's end for West Bromwich Albion. A year after leaving, Ince returned as manager for the 2009–10 season. He resigned from the club on 16 April 2010, but remained manager until the end of the season.

=== 2010–2016: Karl Robinson era ===
On 10 May 2010, Karl Robinson was appointed as the club's new manager, with former England coach John Gorman as his assistant. At 29 years of age, Robinson was at the time of his appointment the youngest manager in the Football League. In his first season in the club Milton Keynes Dons finished fifth in 2010–11 League One. They faced Peterborough United in the play-off semi-finals. Although they won the first leg 2–1, a 2–0 defeat at London Road meant they missed out on the play-off final, losing the semi-final 3–2 on aggregate goals.

The 2011–12 season brought similar results to the previous season with the Dons finishing fifth in 2011–12 League One facing Huddersfield in the play-offs. Losing the first leg 2–0 followed by winning 2–1 at The Galpharm saw Milton Keynes Dons lose 3–2 on aggregate against the eventual play-off winners. The away leg was John Gorman's last match in football after announcing his retirement a few weeks beforehand. Gorman's replacement was announced on 18 May 2012 as being ex-Luton manager Mick Harford along with new part-time coach Ian Wright.

Chart showing the progress of MK Dons' league finishes since the 2004–05 season

Milton Keynes Dons experienced their best ever FA Cup campaign in the 2012–13 season by beating a spirited Cambridge City (0–0 and 6–1), League Two fierce rivals AFC Wimbledon (2–1), Championship Sheffield Wednesday (0–0 and 2–0) and Premier League Queens Park Rangers (4–2) to reach the fifth round of the competition for the first time in their history. Their record-breaking run ended in the fifth round at Stadium MK on 16 February 2013, losing 3–1 to Championship side Barnsley. After being in the top five for most of the season, the club finished the 2013–14 League One season in tenth place.

The 2014–15 season began well. The highlight event of the season's first month was being drawn against Manchester United in the League Cup second round, having dispatched AFC Wimbledon in the first. The Dons recorded a shock 4–0 victory over Manchester United in front of a sell out crowd at Stadium MK. A few weeks later, the Dons recorded their record win, a 6–0 thrashing of Colchester United at home. That record did not last long as it was broken once again with a 7–0 demolition of Oldham Athletic on 20 December 2014. Just over a month later, on 31 January 2015, the Dons recorded a joint record 5–0 away win against Crewe Alexandra, earning a short-lived top spot. On 3 May the club secured promotion to the Football League Championship for the first time, beating Yeovil Town 5–1 and leapfrogging Preston North End (who lost 1–0 at Colchester United) on the final day of the season.

The Dons started life in the Championship by beating Rotherham United away 4–1 on the opening day of the season and gaining seven points from a possible 12 in their first four games. They were not able to sustain this form throughout the season – the Dons did not win any of their final 11 games and they returned to League One after finishing 23rd in the Championship.

On 23 October 2016, Karl Robinson left the club by mutual consent, following a 3–0 home defeat by Southend United the previous day, which had extended the Dons' winless run to four games and left them 19th in the League One table.

=== 2016–2018: Slow decline ===
Robbie Neilson joined MK Dons as manager from Scottish Premiership club Heart of Midlothian in his native Scotland, with his first official game in charge coincidentally an FA Cup tie against Karl Robinson's new club Charlton Athletic. Neilson's reign started off well, with his second game in charge a win over AFC Wimbledon, and in late January 2017 a local derby win against Northampton Town.

The following season started badly; however, on 30 December 2017 the team was noted for a remarkable 1–0 derby win against Peterborough, playing with 9 men for 68 minutes after controversial refereeing decisions and 13 minutes of added time. Neilson left by mutual consent on 20 January 2018 after a run of one win in eleven league games with the club 21st in the table; he was sacked the same day as his last game, a disappointing away 2–1 derby defeat against relegation rivals Northampton Town.

Under Neilson's successor, Dan Micciche, the club continued to struggle in the relegation places. Following a run of poor results with only three wins in sixteen matches in charge, Micciche left the club on 22 April 2018, with assistant manager Keith Millen taking over as a caretaker. On the penultimate weekend of the season another defeat relegated them to League Two (leaving them seven points from safety with one game to play).

=== 2018–2023: Bounce-back and search for stability ===
Former Exeter City manager Paul Tisdale was appointed in June 2018 after 12 years at his previous club. After a season where the Dons were tipped to be favourites for promotion, the club spent most of the season around the automatic promotion and play-off places. Going top after a 2–0 win over Macclesfield Town in November, the club sunk to 8th in February before being one win way away from automatic promotion against play-off hopefuls Colchester United in the penultimate game. The Dons lost 2–0 which led to a "winner takes all" game against 3rd placed Mansfield Town, who were separated by goal difference, to determine who was promoted. MK Dons won 1–0 in front of nearly 21,000 fans meaning they returned to League One at the first attempt.

Following a poor start to the 2019–20 season in which the Dons achieved only one point from a possible 27, the worst run of results in the club's history, Tisdale's contract with the club was mutually terminated on 2 November 2019 following a 1–3 home defeat to fellow relegation-threatened Tranmere Rovers. The next day, Russell Martin was announced as the new permanent first-team manager; he had joined as a player earlier in the year. Fixtures were suspended on 13 March 2020 due to the COVID-19 pandemic, and the clubs later voted to end the season prematurely with immediate effect on 9 June 2020, with the final table decided upon by an unweighted points-per-game system resulting in the club finishing the season in 19th place, thus avoiding relegation.

The Dons went into the final weekend of the 2021–22 League One season with a chance of gaining automatic promotion to the Championship, and even had a slim chance of becoming Champions if they won by a big score and other results went their way. They comfortably beat Plymouth Argyle 5–0, but both Wigan Athletic and Rotherham United won their games against Shrewsbury Town and Gillingham, respectively, to claim the two automatic promotion berths. The Dons finished third and faced Buckinghamshire rivals Wycombe Wanderers in the play-offs. Despite the Dons having home advantage in the second leg of their semi-final, Wycombe won 2–1 on aggregate to reach the final at Wembley.

MK Dons suffered relegation to League Two in the 2022–23 League One season. Liam Manning was replaced as manager in December 2022, but successor Mark Jackson registered just six wins in 25 games and was sacked after the side were relegated following a final day 0–0 draw at Burton Albion.

=== 2023–2026: Return to League Two ===
On 27 May 2023, MK Dons appointed Graham Alexander as their new head coach. After an eight-match winless run, Alexander was sacked with MK Dons in 16th place. On 17 October 2023, MK Dons announced that they had appointed Gateshead manager Mike Williamson as their new head coach. He led MK Dons to a 4th-placed finish, where they faced Crawley Town in the play-off semi-finals. Crawley won 8–1 on aggregate, inflicting the largest play-off defeat in EFL history on the club. This was the sixth time MK Dons had competed in the play-offs without reaching a final.

On 9 August 2024, the owner, Pete Winkelman, sold the club to a Kuwait-based consortium, with Fahad Al Ghanim becoming the club's new chairman, representing the first change in ownership since the club's inception. After four losses in the opening six games, including a 3–0 defeat to arch-rivals AFC Wimbledon, Mike Williamson was appointed as the manager of Carlisle United on 19 September, with the Cumbrians meeting the release clause in his contract. MK Dons appointed Williamson's replacement, the Crawley Town boss Scott Lindsey, on 25 September 2024. Lindsey's contract was terminated on 2 March 2025, with the club in 17th place, following a run of just two wins from 14 league games. On 15 April 2025, Paul Warne was announced as the Head Coach on a 'long term' deal with just 4 games remaining of the 2024–25 EFL League Two season.

Warne achieved promotion with the club at the end of the 2025–26 season, guiding Milton Keynes Dons to League One with a game in hand. They missed out on the title on the final day of the season to Bromley after being held to a 1–1 draw against Fleetwood Town but were promoted as runners-up.

== Kit history ==
Only seasons played by Milton Keynes Dons under that name are given here. For a kit history of Wimbledon F.C., see Wimbledon F.C.#Kit history.

Season	Kit manufacturer	Main sponsor	Back of shirt	Sleeve	Shorts
2004–2005	A-line	Marshall Amplification			
2005–2006	A-line	Marshall Amplification			
2006–2007	Surridge Sports	Marshall Amplification			
2007–2008	Nike	Marshall Amplification			
2008–2009	Nike	Marshall Amplification			
2009–2010	Nike	DoubleTree by Hilton			
2010–2011	ISC	DoubleTree by Hilton			
2011–2012	ISC	DoubleTree by Hilton			
2012–2013	Vandanel	Case Security			
2013–2014	Sondico	Case Security			
2014–2015	Sondico	Suzuki GB			
2015–2016	Erreà	Suzuki GB			
2016–2017	Erreà	Suzuki GB			
2017–2018	Erreà	Suzuki GB			
2018–2019	Erreà	Suzuki GB			
2019–2020	Erreà	Suzuki GB			
2020–2021	Erreà	Suzuki GB			
2021–2022	Erreà	Suzuki GB			
2022–2023	Castore	Suzuki GB	eEnergy		
2023–2024	Castore	Suzuki GB	eEnergy		
2024–2025	Castore	Suzuki GB	eEnergy	Stadium Support Services Ltd	
2025–2026	Reebok	Suzuki GB	Equity Energies	Stadium Support Services Ltd	
2026–2027	Reebok			Visit Kuwait	

Source: Historical Football Kits

== Stadium ==
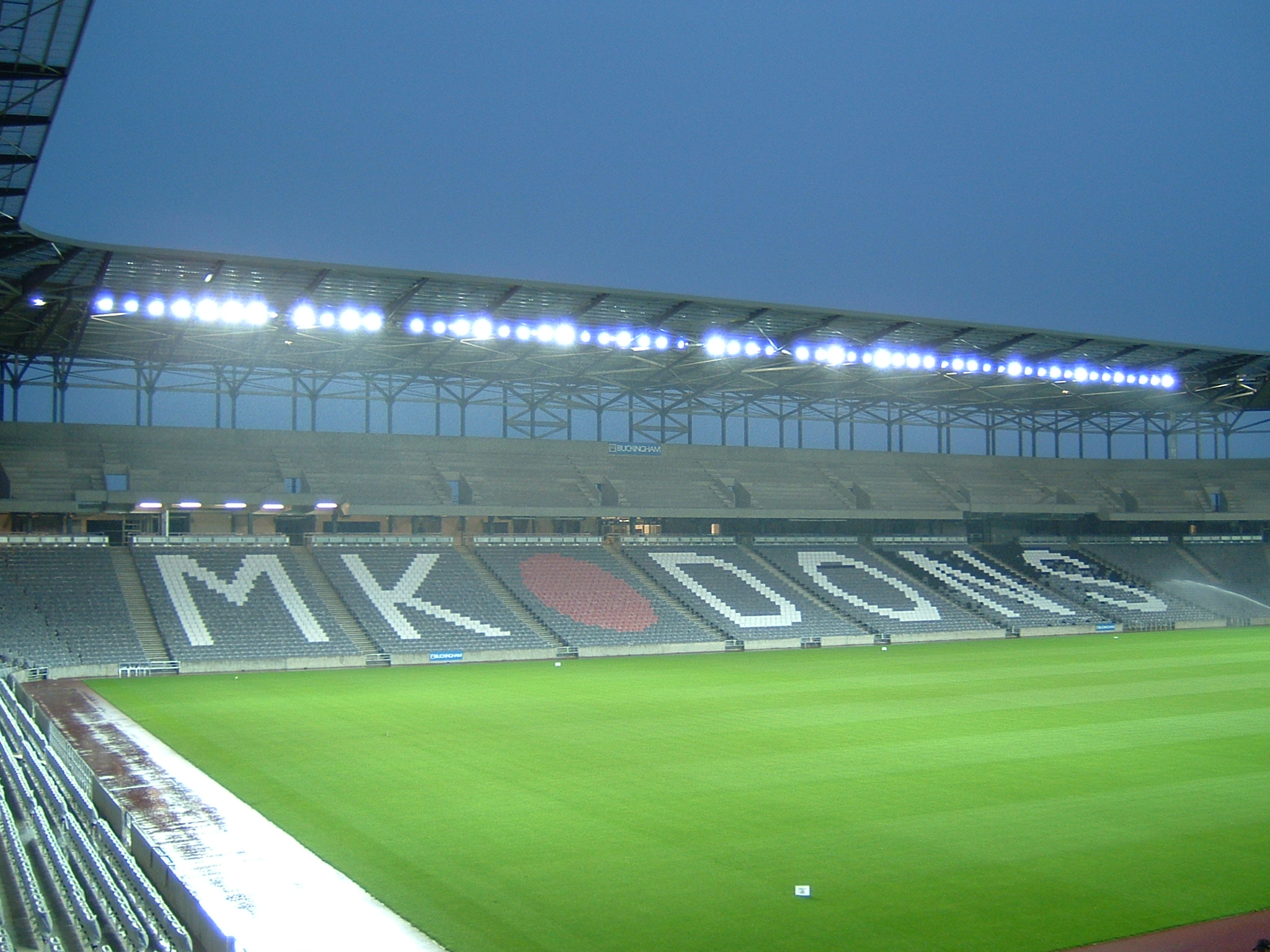
Stadium MK's East Stand in 2007

The club's first stadium was the National Hockey Stadium, which was temporarily converted for football for the duration of the club's stay. Their lease on the venue ended in May 2007.

On 18 July 2007, the club's new 30,500 capacity stadium, Stadium MK in Denbigh hosted its first game, a restricted-entrance event against a young Chelsea XI. The stadium was officially opened on 29 November 2007 by Queen Elizabeth II. The stadium features an open concourse at the top of the lower tier, an integrated hotel with rooms looking over the pitch and conference facilities. The complex was to include a 3,000 capacity indoor arena, where the MK Lions basketball team would be based, but completion of this arena was delayed due to deferral of proposed commercial developments around the site.

In May 2009, the stadium was named as one of 15 stadia put forward as potential hosts for the England 2018 FIFA World Cup bid, which would include increasing capacity to 44,000, however England's bid was later unsuccessful. In recent years Stadium MK has played host to the 2014 FA Women's Cup final, three Rugby World Cup 2015 fixtures and four matches (including a semi-final) of the UEFA Women's Euro 2022.

== Supporters ==
=== Initial supporters' club recognition ===
On 4 June 2005, at the 2005 Football Supporters' Federation "Fans' Parliament" (AGM), the FSF refused the Milton Keynes Dons Supporters Association (MKDSA) membership of the FSF in a debate that, among other arguments, questioned why the Football League had yet to introduce any new rules to prevent the "franchising" of other football clubs in the future. In addition, the FSF membership agreed with the Wimbledon Independent Supporters' Association (WISA) that the MKDSA should not be entitled to join the FSF until they give up all claim to the history and honours of Wimbledon FC. With this in mind, the FSF began discussions aimed at returning Wimbledon FC's honours to the London Borough of Merton.

Shortly afterwards, following heavy criticism for allowing the move, the Football League announced new tighter rules on club relocation. At its AGM on 5 June 2006, the FSF again considered a motion proposed by the FSF Council to allow Milton Keynes Dons Supporters Association membership if the honours and trophies of Wimbledon FC were given to the London Borough of Merton. In October 2006, agreement was reached between the club, the Milton Keynes Dons Supporters Association, the Wimbledon Independent Supporters' Association and the Football Supporters Federation. The FA Cup trophy plus all club patrimony gathered under the name of Wimbledon Football Club would be returned to the London Borough of Merton. Ownership of trademarks and website domain names related to Wimbledon would also be transferred to the borough. As part of the same agreement it was agreed that any reference made to Milton Keynes Dons should refer only to events subsequent to 7 August 2004 (the date of the first league game of Milton Keynes Dons).

As a result of this deal, the FSF announced that the supporters of Milton Keynes Dons would be permitted to become members of the federation, and that it would no longer appeal to the supporters of other clubs to boycott Milton Keynes Dons' matches. On 2 August 2007, Milton Keynes Dons transferred ownership of all Wimbledon Football Club trophies and memorabilia to the London Borough of Merton.

=== Rivalries ===
AFC Wimbledon

Due to their shared ancestry in Wimbledon F.C., there is an unavoidably acrimonious rivalry with AFC Wimbledon since the relocation of Wimbledon F.C. to Milton Keynes;

The first fixture between the two clubs took place on 2 December 2012 in the second round of the 2012–13 FA Cup, where they were drawn to play each other at Stadium MK. Milton Keynes Dons won the match 2–1, with a winner scored in injury time by Jon Otsemobor and later dubbed by MK Dons fans as "The Heel of God" (a reference to Maradona's "Hand of God"). Kyle McFadzean's opening goal for MK Dons in the second match between the two clubs, a 3–1 Milton Keynes win in the first round of the League Cup in August 2014, was also scored with his heel, and was consequently labelled "Heel of God II". Two months later, in the Football League Trophy Southern section second round, AFC Wimbledon defeated MK Dons 3–2 with a winning goal by Adebayo Akinfenwa.

On 10 December 2016, the sides met for the first time in a competitive league fixture following MK Dons' relegation from the Championship and AFC Wimbledon's promotion from League Two the previous season. Milton Keynes Dons won 1–0, with Dean Bowditch scoring the only goal of the game with a 63rd-minute penalty. The first visit of MK Dons to AFC Wimbledon's home ground for a League One match on 14 March 2017 resulted in a 2–0 victory for AFC Wimbledon. The 2018–19 season saw AFC Wimbledon remain in League One, in a higher league than MK Dons for the first time.

In 2017, AFC Wimbledon, in the club's programme for their home game against the Dons, played on 22 September, failed to recognise their opponents by their full name for the second successive season. AFC Wimbledon's official Twitter feed also referred to their opponents as "Milton Keynes" throughout their match coverage. AFC Wimbledon were subsequently threatened by the EFL with disciplinary action, and eventually charged with breaching EFL regulations. The charges were dropped. AFC Wimbledon were forced to refer to MK Dons by their full name ahead of the 2019–20 season, after the EFL stepped in to mediate.

Peterborough United

MK Dons have a rivalry with Peterborough United, since the two clubs have vied head-to-head for promotion to the Championship in recent years. A rivalry also exists between MK Lightning and Peterborough Phantoms in ice hockey that pre-dates the football rivalry.

Northampton Town

Northampton is geographically the closest urban area to Milton Keynes with a professional football team, Northampton Town, the two places separated by a little over 20 miles (32 km). Former MK Dons Supporters' Association Chairman John Brockwell had stated that the fans were looking forward to hosting Northampton Town, the club that, geographically at least, are their nearest rivals. Although Peterborough United have been traditionally Northampton's main rivals, the "Cobblers" spokesman has stated, in 2008, that, "with MK Dons now on the fixture list, it gives [Northampton] supporters the chance to develop another rivalry."

In January 2016 police arrested a Milton Keynes fan for setting off pyrotechnics in the away end, and two Northampton fans and three more Milton Keynes fans were ejected from the ground. In 2018, before the 30 January 3pm kick-off in the League One game between the two clubs, Northamptonshire Police arrested seven travelling supporters of the Dons, with one Northampton fan also arrested. Four arrests were for public order offences, one for criminal damage, one for pitch encroachment, one for obstructing the police, and one for affray.

Wycombe Wanderers

Wycombe Wanderers are the only other professional team in Buckinghamshire, so games between the two teams are labelled "the Bucks derby".

== Community ==
Through the work of its charity, Milton Keynes Dons SET (Sport and Educational Trust), the club works locally in the fields of education, social inclusion, participation and football development. It works with schools, has 14 disability teams playing in regional or national competitions, works with BME (black and minority ethnic) community groups and runs many activities for women and girls.

Milton Keynes Dons' work in the community has been recognised by the award of the Football League Awards Community Club of the Season for the South East & East in both 2012 and 2022, and in the award of an honorary doctorate to chairman Pete Winkelman by the Open University in June 2013. The club have also been awarded Family Excellence status by the EFL every year since the award's inception in 2008, recognising continuing improvement and best practice in family engagement.

== Youth academy ==
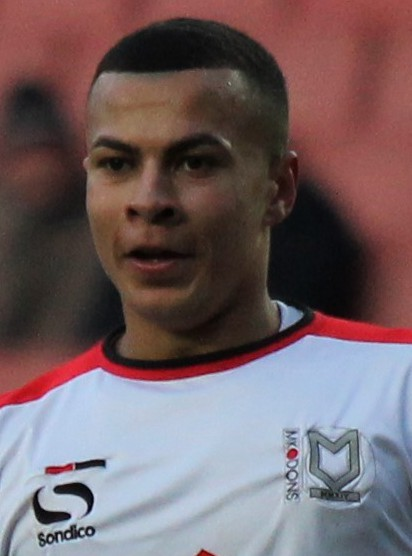
Milton Keynes Dons sold Dele Alli to Tottenham Hotspur for £5 million in 2015

Striker Sam Baldock was the first notable academy graduate who, after making 102 appearances, moved on to West Ham United for a seven-figure sum. He later became captain of Bristol City and also played for Derby County. As of February 2015, Daniel Powell, Tom Flanagan and George Baldock, brother of Sam, all played regularly for the MK Dons first team.

On 2 February 2015, Milton Keynes Dons academy graduate and first team midfielder Dele Alli was sold to Premier League side Tottenham Hotspur for a fee in the region of £5 million. Alli became the first Milton Keynes Dons academy graduate to make a full England senior team debut, on 9 October 2015.

Kevin Danso is a graduate of the academy who went on to play for Austria and became the youngest player to make a league appearance in FC Augsburg's history, when making his Bundesliga debut.

Other notable youth graduates who have gone on to play at a higher level include George Williams, Brendan Galloway, Scotland international Liam Kelly and England youth team international Sheyi Ojo.

On 9 August 2016, in a first-round EFL Cup match against Newport County, manager Karl Robinson selected a first-team squad composed of 13 academy graduates and players, giving eight of those players their full debuts for the club including Brandon Thomas-Asante. The game ended with a 2–3 away win for the club.

== Players ==
As of 18 October 2026

=== First-team squad ===
Note: Flags indicate national team as defined under FIFA eligibility rules; some limited exceptions apply. Players may hold more than one non-FIFA nationality.

No.	Pos.	Nation	Player
1	GK	SCO	Craig MacGillivray
2	DF	AUS	Gethin Jones
4	MF	ENG	Daniel Barlaser
5	DF	ENG	Charlie Goode
7	MF	ENG	Daniel Crowley
8	MF	ENG	Alex Gilbey (captain)
9	FW	ENG	Sam Nombe
10	FW	WAL	Aaron Collins
12	DF	ENG	Kane Wilson
13	FW	SCO	Callum Paterson
15	DF	ENG	Cohen Bramall
17	FW	AUS	Sam Silvera
19	DF	ENG	Ryan Barnett (on loan from Wrexham)
20	DF	ENG	Eli Campbell (on loan from Everton)
21	DF	ENG	Marvin Ekpiteta
22	MF	ENG	Ibrahim Fullah (on loan from Charlton Athletic)

No.	Pos.	Nation	Player
23	GK	ENG	Will Dennis
24	MF	ENG	Ryan Wintle
26	MF	ENG	Ben Wiles
28	MF	ENG	Jay Matete
29	FW	ENG	Rushian Hepburn-Murphy
32	DF	ENG	Jack Sanders
33	MF	ENG	Damerai Singh-Hurditt
34	MF	WAL	Callum Tripp
35	DF	ENG	Curtis Nelson (vice-captain)
38	MF	ENG	Keon Lewis-Burgess
39	FW	NZL	Jack Perniskie
40	MF	ENG	Rian Silver
42	MF	GHA	Elisha Boateng
46	DF	ENG	Jack Burke
47	MF	ENG	Simone Troso
51	GK	ENG	Seb Stacey

=== Out on loan ===
Note: Flags indicate national team as defined under FIFA eligibility rules; some limited exceptions apply. Players may hold more than one non-FIFA nationality.

No.	Pos.	Nation	Player
14	MF	ENG	Will Collar (at Burton Albion until end of season)
18	DF	ENG	Charlie Waller (at Worthing until 1 December 2026)

=== Notable players ===
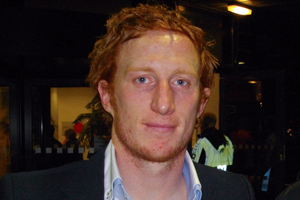
Dean Lewington, the most recent captain of MK Dons, has played more matches for the team than any other player. Pictured in 2011, he was the last former Wimbledon player left in the club's squad.

Mark Wright finished the 2007–08 season as the club's top goalscorer, helping the Dons win both the League Two title and the Football League Trophy. Jon Otsemobor made 44 appearances for the club and scored the winning goal in the first match against AFC Wimbledon with a back-heel that was later dubbed the "Heel of God".

Milton Keynes Dons were former Premier League player Jimmy Bullard's last club before his retirement from football, making only three appearances for the club. Similarly Dietmar Hamman made 12 appearances as a player-coach before retiring.

Notable players loaned from other clubs were strikers Patrick Bamford, who scored 18 goals in 37 games, Benik Afobe, who became the league's top scorer in just six months, and Ángelo Balanta, whose loan spell lasted three years. Former Ireland international Clinton Morrison and former Premier League players Paul Rachubka and James Tavernier also had short loan spells with the club.

Alan Smith, most known for his time at Leeds United and Manchester United, joined the club on loan, signing from Newcastle United before making the move permanent totalling 67 appearances for the club. Other international players who have worn the Dons shirt include Tore André Flo, Ali Gerba, Michel Pensée, Cristian Benavente, Richard Pacquette, Keith Andrews, Russell Martin, Tom Flanagan, Drissa Diallo, Pelé and Ousseynou Cissé. Joe Walsh, Brendan Galloway, Jordan Houghton, Connor Furlong, Gboly Ariyibi, Gareth Edds all represented their countries at youth level.

This list contains players who have made 100 or more league appearances (with the exception of Dele Alli). Appearances and goals apply to league matches only; substitute appearances are included. Names in bold denote current Milton Keynes Dons players.

Statistics are correct as of 8 May 2025.

Name	Nationality	Position (Note: For a full description of positions see Football positions.)	Milton Keynes Dons career	Apps	Goals	Notes
Dele Alli	England	Midfielder	2011–2015	88	24	
Sam Baldock	England	Forward	2006–2011	102	33	
Dean Bowditch	England	Winger	2011–2017	185	37	
Samir Carruthers	Ireland	Midfielder	2013–2017	117	6	
Luke Chadwick	England	Midfielder	2008–2014	210	17	
Gareth Edds	Australia	Midfielder	2004–2008	122	10	
Stephen Gleeson	Ireland	Midfielder	2009–2014	174	16	
Willy Guéret	France	Goalkeeper	2007–2011	135	0	
Antony Kay	England	Defender	2012–2016	142	6	
Mathias Kouo-Doumbé	France	Defender	2009–2013	121	11	
Peter Leven	Scotland	Midfielder	2008–2011	113	22	
Dean Lewington	England	Defender	2004–2025	791	21	(Note: Dean Lewington played for Wimbledon before the club was renamed in 2004. The date of Milton Keynes Dons's first league match, 7 August 2004, was agreed in 2006 to be the date on which Lewington ceased to play for Wimbledon and began to play for Milton Keynes Dons.)
David Martin	England	Goalkeeper	2004–2006; 2010–17	274	0	
Izale McLeod	England	Forward	2004–2007; 2013–2014	165	62	
Sean O'Hanlon	England	Defender	2006–2011	157	15	
Clive Platt	England	Forward	2005–2007	102	27	
Darren Potter	Ireland	Midfielder	2011–2017	228	9	
Daniel Powell	England	Forward	2008–2017	228	37	
Ben Reeves	Northern Ireland	Midfielder	2013–2017	102	22	
Jordan Spence	England	Defender	2013–2016	100	2	
Aaron Wilbraham	England	Forward	2005–2011	178	50	
Shaun Williams	Ireland	Defender	2011–2014	108	19	
George Williams	England	Defender	2016–2021	142	4	

=== Player of the Year ===
Year	Winner
2005	(England) Ben Chorley
2006	(England) Izale McLeod
2007	(England) Clive Platt
2008	(Republic of Ireland) Keith Andrews
2009	(England) Aaron Wilbraham
2010	(England) Luke Chadwick
2011	(England) Luke Chadwick
2012	(Republic of Ireland) Darren Potter
2013	(Republic of Ireland) Shaun Williams
2014	(Northern Ireland) Ben Reeves
2015	(England) Carl Baker
2016	(England) David Martin

Year	Winner
2017	(England) George Williams
2018	Not awarded (Note: Due to the club's relegation to League Two at the conclusion of the 2017–18 season and overall poor performance, Chairman Pete Winkelman decided not to award a Player of the Year honour.)
2019	(England) Alex Gilbey
2020	(England) Alex Gilbey
2021	(England) Dean Lewington
2022	(England) Scott Twine
2023	(England) Jamie Cumming
2024	(England) Alex Gilbey
2025	Not awarded (Note: Due to the team's poor performance over the season, a club awards ceremony was not held.)
2026	(Republic of Ireland) Liam Kelly

== Club staff ==
As of 19 September 2024

=== Football staff ===
Name	Position
Liam Sweeting	Sporting Director
Simon Crampton	Performance Director
Paul Warne	Manager
Richie Barker	Assistant Manager
Darren Potter	First Team Coach
Andy Warrington	Goalkeeping Coach
Adam Ross	Head of Rehabilitation
Tom Delaney	First Team Physiotherapist
Tom Bromley	Head Strength and Conditioning Coach
Shaun Howl	Head Of Performance Analysis
David Perkins	Lead First-Team Performance Analyst
Nathan Pilecki	Head of Technical Scouting
Ram Srinivas	Data Scientist
Harry Hagues	Kit Manager
Ben Smith	Academy Manager
Martin Harris	Academy Operations Manager
Stephen Payne	Academy Head of Coaching
John Bitting	Lead Professional Development Phase Coach
Caitlin O'Reilly	Senior Sports Therapist
Natascia Bernardi	Academy Head of Player Care

=== Senior management ===
Name	Position
Fahad Al Ghanim	Club Chairman
Hamad Al-Marzouq	Deputy Chairman
Neil Hart	Chief Executive Officer
Mark Davies	Chief Commercial Officer
Ryan Gawley	Group Finance Director
Andy Gibb	Group Sales & Marketing Director

== Honours ==
League

- League One (level 3)
  - Runners-up: 2014–15
- League Two (level 4)
  - Champions: 2007–08
  - Runners-up: 2025–26
  - Promoted: 2018–19

Cup

- Football League Trophy
  - Winners: 2007–08
- Berks & Bucks Senior Cup
  - Winners: 2006–07
  - Runners-up: 2005–06, 2017–18
- Portimão Cup
  - Winners: 2004

Source: MKDons.com

== Milton Keynes Dons Women ==
The club founded a women's association football team in 2009. They operate as part of the club with an identical badge and strip, and as of the 2018–19 season, the team share Stadium MK as their home stadium with their male counterparts, one of the first clubs in the country to do so. They compete in the FA Women's National League South.
