= Andy Taylor (footballer, born 1988) =

English semi-professional footballer who plays as a striker for Brigg Town

Personal information
- Full name: Andrew John Taylor
- Date of birth: 30 October 1988 (age 38)
- Place of birth: Caistor, England
- Height: 5 ft 8 in (1.73 m)
- Position: Striker

Team information
- Current team: Brigg Town

Youth career
- 2002–2005: Grimsby Town

Senior career*
Years	Team	Apps	(Gls)
2005–2009	Grimsby Town	43	(7)
2009	Brigg Town		
2010	Bottesford Town		
2010–2011	Caistor Rovers	12	(25)
2011–2014	Grimsby Borough	103	(47)
2016–2019	Cleethorpes Town		
2019–2020	North Ferriby		
2020–	Brigg Town		
- * Club domestic league appearances and goals as of 12:30, 24 July 2009 (UTC)

Andrew John Taylor (born 30 October 1988) is an English professional footballer who plays as a striker for Brigg Town.

He played as a professional in the Football League for Grimsby Town from 2005 until 2009, and has since had a career in Non-League football with Brigg Town, Bottesford Town, Caistor Rovers, Grimsby Borough, Cleethorpes Town and North Ferriby.

== Career ==
=== Early career ===
Taylor was born on 30 October 1988, in Caistor, Lincolnshire. He was promoted to the first-team squad at Grimsby Town in the 2005–06 season by manager Russell Slade. However, he did not come to prominence until the following season under Graham Rodger, when he scored in a 2–0 away win over Chester City.

He was mainly used as a substitute by Alan Buckley throughout the 2007–08 season and scored 7 goals coming off the bench for the Mariners - none were headers despite him standing only 5 ft 8 inches tall. Taylor was picked as first-choice striker in the early part of the 2008–2009 season alongside Martin Butler and Danny North. After the dismissal of Buckley in September 2008, Taylor would not feature for the rest of the season under new manager Mike Newell. On 14 May 2009, Newell told Taylor he was free to leave the club and on 19 May he left Grimsby by mutual consent. He had a trial with York City in July, playing as a second-half substitute in a pre-season friendly against Bradford City, although he was not offered a contract by the club.

=== Non-League career ===
Just before the start of the season, Taylor opted to sign for non-League club Brigg Town. Taylor left the Zebras in October 2009, and joined Bottesford Town in January 2010. He then left the Poachers and joined Caistor Rovers in August 2010.

Taylor signed a contract with Grimsby Borough in the summer of the 2011, moving on to Cleethorpes Town before joining North Ferriby in October 2019, scoring on his debut.

He returned to Brigg Town in 2020 over ten years since he last played for them.

== Honours ==
Grimsby Town

- League Two play-off runner-up: 2005–06
- Football League Trophy runner-up: 2007–08
