= 2007–08 Football League Trophy =

Tournament details
- Country: England; Wales
- Teams: 48

Final positions
- Champions: MK Dons
- Runners-up: Grimsby Town

The 2007–08 Football League Trophy, known as the 2007–08 Johnstone's Paint Trophy for sponsorship reasons, was the 27th staging of the Football League Trophy, a knockout competition for English football clubs in Leagues One and Two. The winners were MK Dons and the runners-up were Grimsby Town, both from League Two.

The competition began on 18 September 2007 and ended with the final on 30 March 2008. The final took place at Wembley Stadium for the first time since 2000.

In the first round, there are four sections: North West, North East, South West and South East. In the second round this narrows to simply a Northern and a Southern section, whereupon each section gradually eliminates teams in knock-out fashion until each has a winning finalist. At this point, the two winning finalists face each other in the combined final for the honour of the trophy.

Doncaster Rovers were the defending champions, but lost to Grimsby on penalties in the Third round.

MK Dons won the final, beating Grimsby Town 2–0.

== First round ==
16 teams received byes to the second round from each section. The other remaining teams start in a single-legged knockout. Should the scores be level after 90 minutes, the match entered a penalty shootout phase, with no extra-time being played.

=== Northern Section ===
| Tie no | Home team | Score | Away team | Attendance |
North-West
| 1 | Tranmere Rovers | 0–1 | Morecambe | 2,557 |
| 2 | Chester City | 1–1 | Crewe Alexandra | 2,126 |
Chester City won 4 – 3 on penalties
| 3 | Wrexham | 0–1 | Macclesfield Town | 1,503 |
| 4 | Accrington Stanley | 2–3 | Oldham Athletic | 1,465 |
North-East
| 5 | Chesterfield | 1–3 | Hartlepool United | 2,127 |
| 6 | Mansfield Town | 0–1 | Rotherham United | 1,578 |
| 7 | Doncaster Rovers | 5–1 | Bradford City | 4,710 |
| 8 | Grimsby Town | 4–1 | Huddersfield Town | 1,204 |

=== Southern Section ===
| Tie no | Home team | Score | Away team | Attendance |
South-West
| 1 | AFC Bournemouth | 2–0 | Walsall | 2,206 |
| 2 | Swansea City | 3–2 | Millwall | 5,721 |
| 3 | Swindon Town | 4–1 | Brentford | 3,118 |
| 4 | Yeovil Town | 1–0 | Shrewsbury Town | 1,669 |
South-East
| 1 | Luton Town | 2–0 | Northampton Town | 2,532 |
| 2 | Nottingham Forest | 2–3 | Peterborough United | 3,102 |
| 3 | Notts County | 0–1 | Leyton Orient | 900 |
| 4 | Southend United | 2–2 | Dagenham & Redbridge | 1,204 |
Dagenham & Redbridge won 7 – 6 on penalties

== Second round ==
In the second round, the sixteen winning teams from the first round were joined by the teams with byes. Again, there were eight one-legged matches in each section (North and South), with a penalty shootout if a draw occurred after 90 minutes.

The teams that received byes in the Northern section were Bury, Carlisle United, Darlington, Leeds United, Lincoln City, Port Vale, Rochdale and Stockport County, while Barnet, Brighton & Hove Albion, Bristol Rovers, Cheltenham Town, Gillingham, Hereford United, Milton Keynes Dons and Wycombe Wanderers received byes in the Southern section.

=== Northern Section ===
| Tie no | Home team | Score | Away team | Attendance |
|---|---|---|---|---|
| 1 | Macclesfield Town | 0–1 | Stockport County | 2,248 |
| 2 | Carlisle United | 4–2 | Chester City | 3,154 |
| 3 | Morecambe | 2–2 | Port Vale | 1,644 |
Morecambe won 4 – 2 on penalties
| 4 | Rochdale | 1–3 | Bury | 2,376 |
| 5 | Doncaster Rovers | 3–0 | Oldham Athletic | 4,608 |
| 6 | Darlington | 0–1 | Leeds United | 7,891 |
| 7 | Lincoln City | 2–5 | Hartlepool United | 936 |
| 8 | Rotherham United | 1–1 | Grimsby Town | 2,362 |
Grimsby Town won 4 – 2 on penalties

=== Southern Section ===
| Tie no | Home team | Score | Away team | Attendance |
|---|---|---|---|---|
| 1 | Hereford United | 0–0 | Yeovil Town | 1,859 |
Yeovil Town won 4 – 2 on penalties
| 2 | Bristol Rovers | 0–1 | AFC Bournemouth | 3,313 |
| 3 | Swindon Town | 1–3 | Cheltenham Town | 3,765 |
| 4 | Swansea City | 2–0 | Wycombe Wanderers | 5,922 |
| 5 | Milton Keynes Dons | 3–1 | Peterborough United | 5,087 |
| 6 | Brighton & Hove Albion | 2–1 | Barnet | 1,995 |
| 7 | Leyton Orient | 0–1 | Dagenham & Redbridge | 2,397 |
| 8 | Gillingham | 4–3 | Luton Town | 1,417 |

== Area quarter-finals ==
In the third round, the winning teams from the second round play in eight one-legged matches, four in each section (North and South). Again, a penalty shootout followed if the match was drawn after 90 minutes. Matches were played on 13 November and 14 November 2007.

=== Northern Section ===
| Tie no | Home team | Score | Away team | Attendance |
|---|---|---|---|---|
| 1 | Carlisle United | 0–3 | Stockport County | 3,395 |
| 2 | Hartlepool United | 1–1 | Morecambe | 2,776 |
Morecambe won 4 – 2 on penalties
| 3 | Leeds United | 1–2 | Bury | 18,809 |
| 4 | Grimsby Town | 2–2 | Doncaster Rovers | 4,011 |
Grimsby Town won 5 – 4 on penalties

=== Southern Section ===
| Tie no | Home team | Score | Away team | Attendance |
|---|---|---|---|---|
| 1 | AFC Bournemouth | 0–2 | Milton Keynes Dons | 3,247 |
| 2 | Swansea City | 1–0 | Yeovil Town | 6,644 |
| 3 | Gillingham | 4–0 | Dagenham & Redbridge | 2,904 |
| 4 | Brighton & Hove Albion | 4–1 | Cheltenham Town | 2,490 |

== Area semi-finals ==
Matches were played on 8 January 2008.

=== Northern Section ===
| Tie no | Home team | Score | Away team | Attendance |
|---|---|---|---|---|
| 1 | Morecambe | 2–0 | Bury | 2,434 |
| 2 | Stockport County | 1–2 | Grimsby Town | 3,679 |

=== Southern Section ===
| Tie no | Home team | Score | Away team | Attendance |
|---|---|---|---|---|
| 1 | Gillingham | 1–1 | Milton Keynes Dons | 3,717 |
Milton Keynes Dons won 5 – 4 on penalties
| 2 | Swansea City | 1–0 | Brighton & Hove Albion | 6,066 |

== Area finals ==
=== Northern Area final ===
2008-02-26
19:45

| Morecambe | 0–1 | Grimsby Town |
|---|---|---|
| | | Bolland 69' |

Christie Park, Morecambe
Attendance: 3,207
Referee: Nigel Miller (County Durham)

2008-03-04
19:45

| Grimsby Town | 0–0 | Morecambe |

Blundell Park, Cleethorpes
Attendance: 7,417
Referee: Paul Taylor (Hertfordshire)

=== Southern Area final ===
2008-02-19
19:45

| Swansea City | 0–1 | Milton Keynes Dons |
|---|---|---|
| | | Johnson 69' |

Liberty Stadium
Attendance: 10,125
Referee: Tony Bates (Staffordshire)

2008-02-25
19:45

| Milton Keynes Dons | 0–1 | Swansea City |
|---|---|---|
| | | Scotland 20' (pen.) |
Penalties
| | 5–4 |

stadium:mk, Milton Keynes
Attendance: 9,757
Referee: Andy D'Urso (Essex)

== Final ==
2008-03-30
13:15

| Grimsby Town | 0–2 | Milton Keynes Dons |
|---|---|---|
| | (Report) | Andrews 74' (pen.); O'Hanlon 81' |

Wembley Stadium, London
Attendance: 56,618
Referee: Phil Joslin (Nottinghamshire)
