= 2004–05 Grimsby Town F.C. season =

Grimsby Town
2004–05 season
- Chairman: Peter Furneaux
- Manager: Russell Slade
- Stadium: Blundell Park
- Football League Two: 18th
- FA Cup: First round
- Football League Cup: Second round
- Football League Trophy: First round
- Lincolnshire Senior Cup: Semi-final
- Top goalscorer: League: Michael Reddy (9); All: Andy Parkinson, Michael Reddy (9)
- Highest home attendance: 7941 v Scunthorpe United (23 April 2005)
- Lowest home attendance: 3005 v Wigan Athletic (24 August 2004)
Home colours	Away colours

== Transfers ==
=== Transfers in ===
Date	Pos	Player	Transferred from	Fee	Ref
17 June 2004	DF	(England) Justin Whittle	(England) Hull City	Free Transfer	
18 June 2004	DF	(England) Simon Ramsden	(England) Sunderland	Free Transfer	
1 July 2004	MF	(England) Terry Fleming	(England) Cambridge United	Free Transfer	
1 July 2004	MF	(England) Paul Ashton	(England) Leicester City	Free Transfer	
5 July 2004	DF	(England) Rob Jones	(England) Stockport County	Free Transfer	
10 July 2004	MF	(England) Andy Parkinson	(England) Sheffield United	Free Transfer	
16 July 2004	DF	(England) Ronnie Bull	(England) Millwall	Free Transfer	
20 July 2004	FW	(Republic of Ireland) Michael Reddy	(England) Sunderland	Free Transfer	
24 July 2004	MF	(France) Thomas Pinault	(England) Colchester United	Free Transfer	
29 July 2004	GK	(Wales) Anthony Williams	(England) Hartlepool United	Free Transfer	
6 August 2004	FW	(Trinidad and Tobago) Clint Marcelle	(England) Scarborough	Free Transfer	
14 August 2004	DF	(England) Dean Gordon	(England) Coventry City	Free Transfer	
10 September 2004	FW	(Scotland) Colin Cramb	(England) Shrewsbury Town	Free Transfer	
15 September 2004	DF	(England) Terrell Forbes	(England) Queens Park Rangers	Free Transfer	
23 December 2004	FW	(Scotland) Martin Gritton	(England) Torquay United	Undisclosed	
29 December 2004	DF	(England) Glen Downey	(England) Scarborough	Free Transfer	

=== Loans in ===
Date	Pos	Player	Transferred from	Date Until	Ref
6 July 2004	MF	(England) Ashley Sestanovich	(England) Sheffield United	12 January 2005	
3 September 2004	FW	(England) Paul Robinson	(England) Tranmere Rovers	3 October 2004	
3 September 2004	FW	(England) Chris Williams	(England) Stockport County	26 September 2004	
22 October 2004	FW	(Republic of Ireland) Jon Daly	(England) Stockport County	10 November 2004	
4 March 2005	MF	(England) Matt Harrold	(England) Brentford	5 May 2005	

=== Transfers out ===
Date	Pos	Player	Transferred To	Fee	Ref
31 May 2004	DF	(England) Mike Edwards	(England) Notts County	Free Transfer	
18 June 2004	FW	(England) Phil Jevons	(England) Yeovil Town	Free Transfer	
26 June 2004	MF	(Scotland) Stuart Campbell	(England) Bristol Rovers	Free Transfer	
5 July 2004	GK	(Northern Ireland) Aidan Davison	(England) Colchester United	Free Transfer	
14 July 2004	MF	(Scotland) Iain Anderson	(Scotland) Dundee	Released	
5 August 2004	MF	(Wales) Darren Barnard	(England) Aldershot Town	Released	
5 August 2004	MF	(England) Paul Warhurst	(England) Blackpool	Released	
5 August 2004	MF	(Jamaica) Jamie Lawrence	(England) Brentford	Released	
5 August 2004	FW	(England) Isaiah Rankin	(England) Brentford	Free Transfer	
5 August 2004	GK	(England) Andy Pettinger	(England) Ossett Town	Released	
5 August 2004	DF	(Jamaica) Simon Ford	(England) Redbridge	Released	
5 August 2004	DF	(England) Wes Parker	(England) Gainsborough Trinity	Released	
5 August 2004	MF	(United States) John Thorrington	(United States) Chicago Fire	Released	
5 August 2004	FW	(France) Mickael Antoine-Curier	(Norway) Vard Haugesund	Released	
5 August 2004	FW	(England) Liam Nimmo	(England) Spalding United	Released	
5 August 2004	FW	(England) Jonathan Rowan	(England) Kidderminster Harriers	Released	
31 October 2004	FW	(Trinidad and Tobago) Clint Marcelle	(England) Tamworth	Released	
11 January 2005	MF	(England) Ashley Hildred	(England) Hereford United	Released	
14 January 2005	MF	(Scotland) Colin Cramb	(Scotland) Hamilton Academical	Free Transfer	
24 January 2005	FW	(England) Darren Mansaram	(England) Halifax Town	Free Transfer	
25 February 2005	DF	(England) Greg Young	(England) Halifax Town	Free Transfer	
1 March 2005	GK	(England) Paul Fraser	(England) Ossett Town	Released	
1 March 2005	DF	(England) Kirk Wheeler	(England) Ossett Town	Released	
1 March 2005	FW	(England) Giovanni Carchedi	(England) Ossett Town	Released	
6 March 2005	DF	(England) Dean Gordon	(Cyprus) APOEL Nicosia	Free Transfer	

=== Loans out ===
Date	Pos	Player	Transferred To	Date Until	Ref
3 September 2004	FW	(England) Darren Mansaram	(England) Halifax Town	24 October 2004	
16 September 2004	DF	(England) Kirk Wheeler	(England) Barrow	16 October 2004	
7 October 2004	DF	(England) Greg Young	(England) Northwich Victoria	24 October 2004	
15 October 2004	MF	(England) Graham Hockless	(England) Leigh RMI	10 November 2004	
16 October 2004	DF	(England) Kirk Wheeler	(England) Ossett Albion	16 November 2004	
3 December 2004	DF	(England) Greg Young	(England) Northwich Victoria	11 December 2004	

== League table ==
Pos	Team	Pld	W	D	L	GF	GA	GD	Pts
16	Boston United	46	14	16	16	62	58	+4	58
17	Bury	46	14	16	16	54	54	0	58
18	Grimsby Town	46	14	16	16	51	52	−1	58
19	Notts County	46	13	13	20	46	62	−16	52
20	Chester City	46	12	16	18	43	69	−26	52

Updated to match(es) played on 15 September 2009. Source: 2004–05 League Two
Rules for classification: 1) points; 2) goal difference; 3) number of goals scored.

== Fixtures and results ==
=== Pre-season Matches ===
==== Friendlies ====
Date	Opponent	Venue	Result	Attendance	Scorers
15 Jul	Brigg Town	The Hawthorns, Brigg	W 3 – 2	–	Fleming, Parkinson, Garrocho
20 Jul	Scarborough	McCain Stadium, Scarborough	L 0 – 2	–	–
26 Jul	Willem II	Blundell Park, Cleethorpes	D 1 – 1	–	Parkinson
29 Jul	Gainsborough Trinity	The Northolme, Gainsborough	W 1 – 0	–	McDermott
2 Aug	Halifax Town	The Shay, Halifax	D 1 – 1	–	Mansaram

==== Lincolnshire Cup ====
Date	Opponent	Venue	Result	Attendance	Scorers
23 Jul	Scunthorpe United	Glanford Park, Scunthorpe	D 0 – 0	–	Scunthorpe win 5–4 on penalties

=== Football League Two ===
Date	Opponent	Venue	Result	Attendance	Scorers
7 Aug	Darlington	Reynolds Arena, Darlington	L 0 – 1	–	–
10 Aug	Boston United	Blundell Park, Cleethorpes	D 1 – 1	–	Reddy
14 Aug	Bury	Blundell Park, Cleethorpes	W 5 – 1	–	Mansaram, Sestanovich, Pinault (2), Reddy
21 Aug	Rushden and Diamonds	Nene Park, Irthlingborough	L 0 – 1	–	–
28 Aug	Mansfield Town	Blundell Park, Cleethorpes	W 2 – 0	–	Pinault, Crowe
30 Aug	Wycombe Wanderers	Adams Park, Wycombe	L 0 – 2	–	–
4 Sep	Rochdale	Blundell Park, Cleethorpes	L 0 – 1	–	–
11 Sep	Macclesfield Town	Moss Rose, Macclesfield	L 1 – 3	–	Crowe
18 Sep	Leyton Orient	Blundell Park, Cleethorpes	W 2 – 0	–	Crowe, Pinault
25 Sep	Cambridge United	Abbey Stadium, Cambridge	W 2 – 0	–	Parkinson, McDermott
1 Oct	Cheltenham Town	Blundell Park, Cleethorpes	D 1 – 1	–	Parkinson
8 Oct	Northampton Town	Sixfields Stadium, Northampton	W 1 – 0	–	Gordon
16 Oct	Bristol Rovers	Blundell Park, Cleethorpes	D 0 – 0	–	–
19 Oct	Shrewsbury Town	Gay Meadow, Shrewsbury	D 1 – 1	–	Fleming
23 Oct	Chester City	Deva Stadium, Chester	L 1 – 2	–	Daly
30 Oct	Swansea City	Blundell Park, Cleethorpes	D 1 – 1	–	Cramb
6 Nov	Scunthorpe United	Glanford Park, Scunthorpe	L 0 – 2	–	–
20 Nov	Kidderminster Harriers	Blundell Park, Cleethorpes	W 2 – 1	–	Gordon, Pinault
26 Nov	Southend United	Roots Hall, Southend	D 1 – 1	–	McDermott
7 Dec	Notts County	Blundell Park, Cleethorpes	W 3 – 2	–	Bull, Parkinson, Whittle
11 Dec	Yeovil Town	Huish Park, Yeovil	L 1 – 2	–	Sestanovich
17 Dec	Oxford United	Blundell Park, Cleethorpes	D 1 – 1	–	Cramb
26 Dec	Macclesfield Town	Blundell Park, Cleethorpes	D 0 – 0	–	–
29 Dec	Lincoln City	Sincil Bank, Lincoln	D 0 – 0	–	–
3 Jan	Cambridge United	Blundell Park, Cleethorpes	W 3 – 0	–	Pinault, Bull, Gritton
11 Jan	Northampton Town	Blundell Park, Cleethorpes	L 1 – 2	–	Reddy
15 Jan	Leyton Orient	Brisbane Road, Leyton, London	W 2 – 1	–	Parkinson, Gritton
22 Jan	Lincoln City	Blundell Park, Cleethorpes	L 2 – 4	–	Pinault, Coldicott
28 Jan	Cheltenham Town	Whaddon Road, Cheltenham	W 3 – 2	–	Fleming, Reddy (2)
5 Feb	Bristol Rovers	Memorial Ground, Bristol	L 0 – 3	–	–
12 Feb	Shrewsbury Town	Blundell Park, Cleethorpes	L 0 – 1	–	–
19 Feb	Swansea City	Vetch Field, Swansea	D 0 – 0	–	–
22 Feb	Chester City	Blundell Park, Cleethorpes	W 1 – 0	–	Gritton
26 Feb	Yeovil Town	Blundell Park, Cleethorpes	W 2 – 1	–	Gritton, Parkinson
1 Mar	Rochdale	Spotland, Rochdale	L 0 – 2	–	–
5 Mar	Oxford United	Kassam Stadium, Oxford	W 2 – 1	–	Harrold, Parkinson
12 Mar	Boston United	York Street, Boston	D 1 – 1	–	Harrold
19 Mar	Darlington	Blundell Park, Cleethorpes	L 0 – 1	–	–
25 Mar	Bury	Gigg Lane, Bury	L 1 – 3	–	Reddy
28 Mar	Rushden and Diamonds	Blundell Park, Cleethorpes	D 0 – 0	–	–
2 Apr	Mansfield Town	Field Mill, Mansfield	L 0 – 2	–	–
9 Apr	Wycombe Wanderers	Blundell Park, Cleethorpes	D 0 – 0	–	–
16 Apr	Notts County	Meadow Lane, Nottingham	D 2 – 2	–	Parkinson, Crowe
23 Apr	Scunthorpe United	Blundell Park, Cleethorpes	D 0 – 0	–	–
30 Apr	Kidderminster Harriers	Aggborough, Kidderminster	W 4 – 1	–	Jones, Reddy (2), Parkinson
7 May	Southend United	Blundell Park, Cleethorpes	D 1 – 1	–	Reddy

=== FA Cup ===
Date	Opponent	Venue	Result	Attendance	Scorers
13 Nov	Exeter City	St James Park, Exeter	L 0 – 1	–	–

=== League Cup ===
Date	Opponent	Venue	Result	Attendance	Scorers
24 Aug	Wigan Athletic	Blundell Park, Cleethorpes	W 1 – 0	–	Parkinson
21 Sep	Charlton Athletic	Blundell Park, Cleethorpes	L 0 – 2	–	–

=== Football League Trophy ===
Date	Opponent	Venue	Result	Attendance	Scorers
28 Sep	Carlisle United	Brunton Park, Carlisle	L 1 – 2	–	Cramb

== Squad overview ==
Note: Flags indicate national team as defined under FIFA eligibility rules; some limited exceptions apply. Players may hold more than one non-FIFA nationality.

No.	Pos.	Nation	Player
1	GK	WAL	Anthony Williams
2	DF	ENG	John McDermott
3	DF	ENG	Greg Young (Departed in February 2005)
4	DF	ENG	Simon Ramsden
5	DF	ENG	Tony Crane
6	DF	ENG	Justin Whittle
7	MF	ENG	Ashley Sestanovich (on loan from Sheffield United)
8	DF	ENG	Jason Crowe
9	FW	IRL	Michael Reddy
10	MF	ENG	Andy Parkinson
11	MF	ENG	Stacy Coldicott
12	MF	ENG	Graham Hockless
13	GK	ENG	Paul Fraser (Departed in February 2005)
14	FW	ENG	David Soames
15	MF	ENG	Terry Fleming
16	DF	ENG	Ronnie Bull
17	MF	FRA	Thomas Pinault

No.	Pos.	Nation	Player
18	DF	ENG	Rob Jones
19	FW	ENG	Darren Mansaram (Departed in February 2005)
19	FW	ENG	Matt Harrold (on loan from Brentford)
20	DF	ENG	Kirk Wheeler (Departed in January 2005)
21	MF	ENG	Ashley Hildred (Departed in November 2004)
21	MF	ENG	Paul Ashton
22	FW	ENG	Giovanni Carchedi (Departed in January 2005)
23	FW	TTO	Clint Marcelle (Departed in October 2004)
24	DF	ENG	Dean Gordon (Departed in March 2005)
25	DF	ENG	Glen Downey
26	FW	IRL	Jon Daly (on loan from Stockport County)
26	FW	ENG	Chris Williams (on loan from Stockport County)
26	FW	SCO	Martin Gritton
27	FW	ENG	Paul Robinson (on loan from Tranmere Rovers)
27	FW	ENG	Danny North
28	DF	ENG	Terrell Forbes
29	FW	SCO	Colin Cramb (Departed in January 2005)
30	MF	ENG	Nick Hegarty

=== Appearances and goals ===
No.	Pos	Nat	Player	Total		League Two		League Cup		Football League Trophy		FA Cup	
No.	Pos	Nat	Player	Apps	Goals	Apps	Goals	Apps	Goals	Apps	Goals	Apps	Goals
1	GK	(Wales) WAL	Anthony Williams	51	0	47	0	2	0	1	0	1	0
2	DF	(England) ENG	John McDermott	45	0	42	0	2	0	0	0	1	0
3	DF	(England) ENG	Greg Young	8	0	6	0	1	0	1	0	0	0
4	DF	(England) ENG	Simon Ramsden	27	0	26	0	1	0	0	0	0	0
5	DF	(England) ENG	Tony Crane	3	0	3	0	0	0	0	0	0	0
6	DF	(England) ENG	Justin Whittle	43	1	40	1	2	0	0	0	1	0
7	MF	(England) ENG	Ashley Sestanovich (on loan from Sheffield United)	26	2	23	2	2	0	0	0	1	0
8	DF	(England) ENG	Jason Crowe	41	4	38	4	2	0	0	0	1	0
9	FW	(Republic of Ireland) IRL	Michael Reddy	45	9	41	9	2	0	1	0	1	0
10	MF	(England) ENG	Andy Parkinson	49	9	46	8	2	1	0	0	1	0
11	MF	(England) ENG	Stacy Coldicott	34	1	32	1	1	0	1	0	0	0
12	MF	(England) ENG	Graham Hockless	8	0	6	0	1	0	1	0	0	0
13	GK	(England) ENG	Paul Fraser	0	0	0	0	0	0	0	0	0	0
14	FW	(England) ENG	David Soames	4	0	4	0	0	0	0	0	0	0
15	DF	(England) ENG	Ronnie Bull	30	2	28	2	1	0	1	0	0	0
16	MF	(England) ENG	Terry Fleming	48	2	44	2	2	0	1	0	1	0
17	MF	(France) FRA	Thomas Pinault	48	7	44	7	2	0	1	0	1	0
18	DF	(England) ENG	Rob Jones	23	1	21	1	0	0	1	0	1	0
19	FW	(England) ENG	Darren Mansaram	8	1	8	1	0	0	0	0	0	0
19	FW	(England) ENG	Matt Harrold (on loan from Brentford)	6	2	6	2	0	0	0	0	0	0
20	DF	(England) ENG	Kirk Wheeler	0	0	0	0	0	0	0	0	0	0
21	MF	(England) ENG	Ashley Hildred	0	0	0	0	0	0	0	0	0	0
21	MF	(England) ENG	Paul Ashton	0	0	0	0	0	0	0	0	0	0
22	FW	(England) ENG	Giovanni Carchedi	0	0	0	0	0	0	0	0	0	0
23	FW	(Trinidad and Tobago) TTO	Clint Marcelle	5	0	3	0	1	0	1	0	0	0
24	DF	(England) ENG	Dean Gordon	23	2	20	2	2	0	0	0	1	0
25	DF	(England) ENG	Glen Downey	1	0	1	0	0	0	0	0	0	0
26	FW	(England) ENG	Chris Williams (on loan from Stockport County)	3	0	3	0	0	0	0	0	0	0
26	FW	(Republic of Ireland) IRL	Jon Daly (on loan from Stockport County)	3	1	3	1	0	0	0	0	0	0
26	FW	(Scotland) SCO	Martin Gritton	24	4	24	4	0	0	0	0	0	0
27	FW	(England) ENG	Paul Robinson (on loan from Tranmere Rovers )	3	0	2	0	0	0	1	0	0	0
27	FW	(England) ENG	Danny North	1	0	1	0	0	0	0	0	0	0
28	DF	(England) ENG	Terrell Forbes	34	0	33	0	0	0	1	0	0	0
29	FW	(Scotland) SCO	Colin Cramb	13	2	11	2	0	0	1	0	1	0
30	MF	(England) ENG	Nick Hegarty	1	0	1	0	0	0	0	0	0	0
