= 2002–03 Grimsby Town F.C. season =

Grimsby Town
2002–03 season
- Chairman: Peter Furneaux
- Manager: Paul Groves
- Stadium: Blundell Park
- Football League First Division: 24th
- FA Cup: Third round
- League Cup: First round

The 2002–03 season saw Grimsby Town compete in the Football League First Division where they finished in 24th position with 39 points and were relegated to the Second Division.

== Transfers ==
=== Transfers in ===
Date	Pos	Player	Transferred from	Fee	Ref
15 May 2002	GK	(England) Bradley Hughes	(England) Watford	Free Transfer	
5 July 2002	MF	(England) Terry Cooke	(England) Manchester City	Free Transfer	
1 August 2002	DF	(England) Greg Young	(England) Sheffield Wednesday	Free Transfer	
1 August 2002	MF	(England) Stephen Downes	(England) Ossett Albion	Free Transfer	
2 August 2022	DF	(England) Steve Chettle	(England) Barnsley	Free Transfer	
2 August 2002	MF	(Wales) Darren Barnard	(England) Barnsley	Free Transfer	
22 August 2002	FW	(England) Robert Taylor	(England) Wolverhampton Wanderers	Free Transfer	
27 September 2022	DF	(Cape Verde) Georges Santos	(England) Sheffield United	Free Transfer	
21 December 2002	GK	(England) Andy Pettinger	(England) Everton	Free Transfer	
13 January 2003	FW	(England) Michael Boulding	(England) Aston Villa	Free Transfer	
7 February 2003	FW	(United States) Jake Sagare	(United States) Portland Timbers	Free Transfer	

=== Loans in ===
Date	Pos	Player	Transferred from	Date Until	Ref
9 August 2002	FW	(England) Paul Robinson	(England) Newcastle United	27 October 2002	
23 August 2002	FW	(England) Steve Kabba	(England) Crystal Palace	8 November 2002	
31 August 2002	GK	(England) Shaun Allaway	(England) Leeds United	5 May 2003	
31 October 2022	MF	(Wales) John Oster	(England) Sunderland	30 December 2002	
2 November 2002	DF	(Republic of Ireland) Jason Gavin	(England) Middlesbrough	5 January 2003	
10 January 2003	FW	(England) Michael Boulding	(England) Aston Villa	12 January 2003	
21 February 2003	MF	(Wales) John Oster	(England) Sunderland	24 March 2003	
22 February 2003	MF	(Scotland) Richard Hughes	(England) Portsmouth	5 May 2003	
27 March 2003	MF	(Republic of Ireland) Michael Keane	(England) Preston North End	5 May 2003	

=== Transfers out ===
Date	Pos	Player	Transferred To	Fee	Ref
31 May 2002	FW	(England) Mike Jeffrey	Retired	Released	
31 May 2002	MF	(England) Gary Moran	(England) Rugby United	Released	
1 June 2002	MF	(Netherlands) Menno Willems	(Netherlands) HFC Haarlem	Released	
1 July 2002	MF	(England) David Smith	(Wales) Swansea City	Released	
1 July 2002	MF	(England) Ben Chapman	(England) Boston United	Released	
3 July 2002	FW	(Scotland) Willie Falconer	(Scotland) Clyde	Released	
5 July 2002	DF	(England) Danny Butterfield	(England) Crystal Palace	Free Transfer	
8 July 2002	FW	(England) Michael Boulding	(England) Aston Villa	Free Transfer	
29 August 2002	FW	(England) Bradley Allen	(England) Peterborough United	Released	
9 September 2002	MF	(England) Wayne Burnett	(England) Woking	Released	
13 February 2003	DF	(England) Paul Raven	(England) Carlisle United	Released	
28 February 2003	MF	(England) Robert Taylor	(England) Scunthorpe United	Released	

=== Loans out ===
Date	Pos	Player	Transferred To	Date Until	Ref
5 September 2002	FW	(England) Phil Jevons	(England) Hull City	4 May 2003	

== Final league table ==
Pos	Team	Pld	W	D	L	GF	GA	GD	Pts	Promotion or relegation
20	Coventry City	46	12	14	20	46	62	−16	50	
21	Stoke City	46	12	14	20	45	69	−24	50	
22	Sheffield Wednesday (R)	46	10	16	20	56	73	−17	46	Relegation to 2003–04 Second Division
23	Brighton & Hove Albion (R)	46	11	12	23	49	67	−18	45	Relegation to 2003–04 Second Division
24	Grimsby Town (R)	46	9	12	25	48	85	−37	39	Relegation to 2003–04 Second Division

Updated to match(es) played on 11 May 2003. Source: Soccerway
Rules for classification: 1) points; 2) goal difference; 3) number of goals scored.
(R) Relegated

== First-team squad ==
As of 4 May 2003

Ages are calculated as of 4 May 2003.

No.	Name	Position	Nationality	Place of birth	Date of birth (age)	Signed from	Date signed	Fee	Contract end
Goalkeepers
1	Danny Coyne	GK	(Wales)	Prestatyn	27 August 1973 (aged 29)	Tranmere Rovers	—	—	30 June 2003
13	Steve Croudson	GK	(England)	Grimsby	14 September 1979 (aged 23)	Academy	—	Trainee	—
29	Bradley Hughes	GK	(England)	Hemel Hempstead	24 March 1984 (aged 19)	Watford	15 May 2002	Free	—
30	Paul Fraser	GK	(England)	Cleethorpes	1 September 1985 (aged 17)	Academy	—	Trainee	—
32	Shaun Allaway	GK	(England)	Reading	16 February 1983 (aged 20)	Leeds United	31 August 2002	Loan	5 May 2003
34	Andrew Pettinger	GK	(England)	Scunthorpe	21 April 1984 (aged 19)	Everton	21 December 2002	Free	—
Defenders
2	John McDermott	DF	(England)	Middlesbrough	3 February 1969 (aged 34)	Academy	—	Trainee	—
3	Tony Gallimore	DF	(England)	Crewe	21 February 1972 (aged 31)	Carlisle United	—	—	—
4	Paul Groves	DF	(England)	Derby	28 February 1968 (aged 35)	West Bromwich Albion	—	—	—
17	Simon Ford	DF	(Jamaica)	London	17 November 1981 (aged 21)	Charlton Athletic	2001	Free	—
18	Steve Chettle	DF	(England)	Nottingham	27 September 1968 (aged 34)	Barnsley	2 August 2002	Free	30 June 2003
23	Georges Santos	DF / MF	(Cape Verde)	Marseille	15 August 1970 (aged 32)	Sheffield United	2 December 2002	Free	30 June 2003
25	Greg Young	DF	(England)	Doncaster	25 April 1983 (aged 20)	Sheffield Wednesday	1 August 2002	Free	—
27	Wes Parker	DF	(England)	Skegness	7 December 1983 (aged 19)	Academy	—	Trainee	—
Midfielders
6	Stacy Coldicott	MF	(England)	Redditch	29 April 1974 (aged 29)	West Bromwich Albion	—	—	—
7	Alan Pouton	MF	(England)	Newcastle upon Tyne	1 February 1977 (aged 26)	York City	—	—	—
8	Stuart Campbell	MF	(Scotland)	Corby	9 December 1977 (aged 25)	Leicester City	30 May 2001	Undisclosed	—
11	Terry Cooke	MF	(England)	Marston Green	5 August 1976 (aged 26)	Manchester City	5 July 2002	Free	30 June 2003
15	Chris Bolder	MF	(England)	Hull	19 August 1982 (aged 20)	Hull City	—	—	—
16	Iain Ward	MF	(England)	Cleethorpes	13 May 1983 (aged 19)	Academy	—	Trainee	—
19	Darren Barnard	MF	(Wales)	Rinteln	30 November 1971 (aged 31)	Barnsley	2 August 2002	Free	—
24	Graham Hockless	MF	(England)	Hull	20 October 1982 (aged 20)	Academy	—	Trainee	—
26	Stephen Downes	MF	(England)	Leeds	12 November 1981 (aged 21)	Ossett Albion	1 August 2002	Free	—
31	Michael Keane	MF	(Republic of Ireland)	Dublin	29 December 1982 (aged 20)	Preston North End	27 March 2003	Loan	5 May 2003
33	Jake Sagare	MF	(United States)	Yakima	5 April 1980 (aged 23)	Portland Timbers	7 February 2003	Free	—
Forwards
9	Phil Jevons	FW	(England)	Liverpool	1 August 1979 (aged 23)	Everton	—	—	—
10	Steve Livingstone	FW	(England)	Middlesbrough	8 September 1968 (aged 34)	Chelsea	—	—	—
12	Jonathan Rowan	FW	(England)	Grimsby	29 November 1981 (aged 21)	Academy	—	Trainee	—
14	Chris Thompson	FW	(England)	Warrington	7 February 1982 (aged 21)	Liverpool	—	—	—
20	David Soames	FW	(England)	Grimsby	10 December 1984 (aged 18)	Academy	—	Trainee	—
21	Michael Boulding	FW	(England)	Sheffield	8 February 1976 (aged 27)	Aston Villa	13 January 2003	Free	—
22	Richard Hughes	MF	(Scotland)	Glasgow	25 June 1979 (aged 23)	Portsmouth	22 February 2003	Loan	5 May 2003
28	Darren Mansaram	FW	(Guyana)	Doncaster	25 June 1984 (aged 18)	Academy	—	Trainee	—
Players who left during the season
5	Paul Raven	DF	(England)	Salisbury	28 July 1970 (aged 32)	West Bromwich Albion	—	—	13 February 2003; Joined Carlisle United
20	Paul Robinson	FW	(England)	Sunderland	20 November 1978 (aged 24)	Newcastle United	9 August 2002	Loan	27 October 2002
21	Robert Taylor	FW	(England)	Norwich	30 April 1971 (aged 32)	Wolverhampton Wanderers	22 August 2002	Free	28 February 2003; Joined Scunthorpe United
21	Jason Gavin	DF	(Republic of Ireland)	Dublin	14 March 1980 (aged 23)	Middlesbrough	2 November 2002	Loan	5 January 2003
22	Steve Kabba	FW	(England)	Lambeth	7 March 1981 (aged 22)	Crystal Palace	23 August 2002	Loan	8 November 2002
31	John Oster	MF	(Wales)	Boston	8 December 1978 (aged 24)	Sunderland	31 October 2002; 21 February 2003	Loan	24 March 2003

== Results ==
Grimsby Town's score comes first

=== Legend ===
Win	Draw	Loss

=== Football League First Division ===
Match	Date	Opponent	Venue	Result	Attendance	Scorers
1	10 August 2002	Norwich City	A	0–4	19,869	
2	13 August 2002	Wimbledon	H	0–0	4,625	
3	17 August 2002	Derby County	H	1–2	5,810	Barnard
4	24 August 2002	Bradford City	A	0–0	10,914	
5	26 August 2002	Portsmouth	H	0–1	5,770	
6	31 August 2002	Millwall	A	0–2	6,677	
7	14 September 2002	Coventry City	A	2–3	12,403	Kabba, Pouton
8	17 September 2002	Sheffield United	A	1–2	14,208	Robinson
9	21 September 2002	Nottingham Forest	H	0–3	7,072	
10	28 September 2002	Brighton & Hove Albion	A	2–1	6,547	Barnard, Pouton
11	5 October 2002	Reading	H	0–3	5,528	
12	8 October 2002	Ipswich Town	H	3–0	4,688	Kabba (2), Pouton
13	12 October 2002	Watford	A	0–2	13,821	
14	19 October 2002	Rotherham United	H	0–0	6,418	
15	26 October 2002	Wolverhampton Wanderers	A	1–4	23,875	Kabba
16	29 October 2002	Burnley	H	6–5	5,620	Kabba (2), Livingstone, Campbell, Pouton, Ford
17	2 November 2002	Gillingham	H	1–1	5,715	Oster
18	9 November 2002	Stoke City	A	2–1	11,488	Livingstone, Campbell
19	16 November 2002	Preston North End	H	3–3	5,774	Campbell, Ford, Mansaram
20	23 November 2002	Crystal Palace	A	0–2	20,093	
21	30 November 2002	Leicester City	H	1–2	7,310	Oster
22	7 December 2002	Walsall	A	1–3	5,888	Livingstone
23	14 December 2002	Preston North End	A	0–3	12,420	
24	21 December 2002	Sheffield Wednesday	H	2–0	8,224	Mansaram, Santos
25	26 December 2002	Derby County	A	3–1	27,141	Oster (2), Soames
26	28 December 2002	Norwich City	H	1–1	8,306	Oster
27	11 January 2003	Wimbledon	A	3–3	1,336	Campbell, Boulding, Andersen o.g.
28	18 January 2003	Millwall	H	0–2	4,993	
29	25 January 2003	Bradford City	H	1–2	5,582	Boulding
30	1 February 2003	Portsmouth	A	0–3	19,428	
31	8 February 2003	Stoke City	H	2–0	5,657	Boulding, Thompson
32	15 February 2003	Gillingham	A	0–3	7,158	
33	22 February 2003	Ipswich Town	A	2–2	24,118	Boulding, Groves
34	1 March 2003	Coventry City	H	0–2	5,736	
35	4 March 2003	Sheffield United	H	1–4	6,897	Campbell
36	10 March 2003	Nottingham Forest	A	2–2	25,507	Pouton, Groves
37	15 March 2003	Watford	H	1–0	4,847	Groves
38	18 March 2003	Rotherham United	A	1–0	6,236	Oster
39	22 March 2003	Burnley	A	1–1	13,445	Campbell
40	5 April 2003	Leicester City	A	0–2	31,014	
41	8 April 2003	Wolverhampton Wanderers	H	0–1	4,983	
42	12 April 2003	Crystal Palace	H	1–4	4,707	Chettle
43	19 April 2003	Sheffield Wednesday	A	0–0	26,082	
44	21 April 2003	Walsall	H	0–1	4,618	
45	26 April 2003	Reading	A	1–2	20,273	Keane
46	4 May 2003	Brighton & Hove Albion	H	2–2	6,393	Keane, Hughes

=== FA Cup ===
Match	Date	Opponent	Venue	Result	Attendance	Scorers
Third round	4 January 2003	Burnley	H	2–2	5,320	Cooke, Mansaram
Third round replay	14 January 2003	Burnley	A	0–4	5,436	

=== Football League Cup ===
Match	Date	Opponent	Venue	Result	Attendance	Scorers
First round	10 September 2002	Chesterfield	H	0–1	3,248	

== Squad statistics ==
No.	Pos.	Name	League		FA Cup		League Cup		Total	
No.	Pos.	Name	Apps	Goals	Apps	Goals	Apps	Goals	Apps	Goals
1	GK	(Wales) Danny Coyne	46	0	2	0	1	0	49	0
2	DF	(England) John McDermott	35	0	1	0	1	0	37	0
3	DF	(England) Tony Gallimore	38	0	2	0	1	0	41	0
4	DF	(England) Paul Groves	32(4)	3	2	0	1	0	35(4)	3
5	DF	(England) Paul Raven	6(1)	0	0	0	0	0	6(1)	0
6	MF	(England) Stacy Coldicott	26(5)	0	1	0	1	0	28(5)	0
7	MF	(England) Alan Pouton	25	5	0	0	1	0	26	5
8	MF	(England) Stuart Campbell	45	6	2	0	1	0	48	6
9	FW	(England) Phil Jevons	0(3)	0	0	0	0	0	0(3)	0
10	FW	(England) Steve Livingstone	21(9)	3	1	0	0	0	22(9)	3
11	MF	(England) Terry Cooke	15(10)	0	2	1	1	0	17(10)	1
12	FW	(England) Jonathan Rowan	2(7)	0	0(1)	0	0(1)	0	2(9)	0
13	GK	(England) Steve Croudson	0	0	0	0	0	0	0	0
14	MF	(England) Chris Thompson	3(3)	1	0(2)	0	0	0	3(5)	1
15	MF	(England) Chris Bolder	7(5)	0	0(1)	0	0	0	7(6)	0
16	DF	(England) Iain Ward	9(2)	0	0(1)	0	0(1)	0	9(4)	0
17	DF	(England) Simon Ford	35(4)	2	1	0	0	0	36(4)	2
18	DF	(England) Steve Chettle	18(2)	1	1(1)	0	1	0	20(3)	1
19	MF	(Wales) Darren Barnard	21(8)	2	1	0	0	0	22(8)	2
20	FW	(England) David Soames	0(10)	1	2	0	0	0	2(10)	1
20	FW	(England) Paul Robinson	5(7)	1	0	0	1	0	6(7)	1
21	FW	(England) Michael Boulding	10(2)	4	0	0	0	0	10(2)	4
21	FW	(England) Robert Taylor	1	0	0	0	0	0	1	0
21	DF	(Republic of Ireland) Jason Gavin	8(2)	0	0	0	0	0	8(2)	0
22	DF	(Scotland) Richard Hughes	12	1	0	0	0	0	12	1
22	FW	(England) Steve Kabba	13	6	0	0	1	0	14	6
23	DF	(Cape Verde) Georges Santos	24(2)	1	1	0	0	0	25(2)	1
24	MF	(England) Graham Hockless	1	0	0	0	0	0	1	0
25	DF	(England) Greg Young	1	0	0	0	0	0	1	0
26	DF	(England) Stephen Downes	0	0	0	0	0	0	0	0
27	DF	(England) Wes Parker	1(4)	0	1	0	0	0	2(4)	0
28	FW	(England) Darren Mansaram	21(13)	2	2	1	0(1)	0	23(14)	3
31	MF	(Republic of Ireland) Michael Keane	7	2	0	0	0	0	7	2
32	MF	(Wales) John Oster	17	6	0	0	0	0	17	6
33	MF	(United States) Jake Sagare	1	0	0	0	0	0	1	0
