= Clint Marcelle =

Trinidadian footballer and coach

Personal information
- Full name: Clint Sherwin Marcelle
- Date of birth: 9 November 1968 (age 57)
- Place of birth: Port of Spain, Trinidad and Tobago
- Height: 5 ft 4 in (1.63 m)
- Position: Forward

Senior career*
Years	Team	Apps	(Gls)
1989–1990	United Petrotrin	–	(–)
1990–1991	Académica	1	(0)
1991–1992	Águeda	23	(4)
1992–1993	Vitoria Setubal	29	(3)
1993–1994	Rio Ave	33	(4)
1994–1996	Felgueiras	51	(3)
1996–1999	Barnsley	69	(8)
1999	→ Scunthorpe United (loan)	10	(0)
2000	Goole	–	(–)
2000–2001	Hull City	23	(2)
2001–2002	Darlington	15	(0)
2002	Harrogate Town	14	(2)
2002–2003	Hucknall Town	20	(6)
2003	Stevenage Borough	3	(0)
2003	Ossett Town	1	(0)
2003–2004	Scarborough	29	(4)
2004	Grimsby Town	3	(0)
2005	Tamworth	10	(0)
2005	Arnold Town	0	(0)
2005	Gainsborough Trinity	7	(1)
2005–2006	Armthorpe Welfare	34	(6)
Total		376	(43)

International career
	Trinidad and Tobago	11	(0)

Managerial career
- 2007–2010: North East Stars
- * Club domestic league appearances and goals

Clint Sherwin Marcelle (born 9 November 1968) is a Trinidadian former professional footballer and coach.

As a player he was a striker and between 1995 and 2006. He notably played Premier League football for Barnsley as well as also playing for Trintoc, RD Agueda, Vitoria Setubal, Rio Ave, FC Felgueiras, Scunthorpe United, Goole, Hull City, Darlington, Harrogate Town, Hucknall Town, Stevenage Borough, Ossett Town, Scarborough, Grimsby Town, Tamworth, Arnold Town, Gainsborough Trinity and Armthorpe Welfare. He previously managed the North East Stars in Trinidad and Tobago's Professional Football League. He also played internationally for his country and now runs his own Football Academy named the "Clint Marcelle Football Academy".

== Playing career ==
=== Felgueiras ===
Clint began his professional career in Portugal in 1995 with Felgueiras and made 21 appearances for the club in his first season. After the end of the 1994–95 campaign, Marcelle opted for a transfer and he moved across Europe to join Barnsley.

=== Barnsley ===
Marcelle signed a contract with Barnsley who were playing in the First Division. He scored on his debut against West Bromwich Albion, and further glory came for Marcelle, when he scored in the game against Bradford City that ensured Barnsley would be playing their football in the Premier League for the 1997–98 season. Marcelle played alongside seasoned veterans such as John Hendrie, Ashley Ward and Neil Redfearn. However, despite his efforts, Marcelle suffered relegation with Barnsley, and the club were to play the 1998–99 season back in the second tier of English football. The new season saw him have a loan spell with Scunthorpe United in 1999, before he was released by the club.

=== Hull City ===
Despite other offers Marcelle decided to remain in Yorkshire and sign with rivals Hull City in 2000. City at the time were at the lower breaches of the professional football system in England and were playing in the Third Division. Despite dropping down two league's this failed to help Marcelle and his time at Boothferry Park was not long lived. After a handful of games he was released at the end of the season and a move up north to join up with fellow Third Division rivals Darlington.

=== Darlington ===
He remained at Darlington for the entire 2001–02 season, making 10 appearances and scored no goals. Without surprise, he was amongst the players that the club let go in the summer. Following a long summer spell and with limited interest about his services in the professional leagues of England, Marcelle opted to drop out of the professional leagues.

=== Harrogate Town ===
Following his release from Darlington, he joined up with semi-professional Conference North outfit Harrogate Town, with the Yorkshire club giving Marcelle a short-term deal. He was to remain with Harrogate until December 2002, when he was released from the club after a fruitless five-month spell.

=== Hucknall Town ===
His next port of call was to sign another short-term contract with another semi-professional club, this time moving to Nottinghamshire outfit Hucknall Town. Marcelle would see out the rest of the 2002–03 campaign with Hucknall before leaving at the end of the season.

=== Stevenage Borough ===
In July it was announced that Marcelle would move up a league to the Conference National and join Stevenage Borough, who also gave him a short term playing contract. Marcelle would only make three appearances for Borough, all of them coming on as a substitute and after two months of football with the club, Stevenage decided to let him leave.

=== Scarborough ===
After initially struggling to find a new club he was eventually signed by Russell Slade at cash strapped Scarborough. For a brief moment, Marcelle found some consistent form and during his time with the Seadogs, he helped the club on their impressive FA Cup run which saw with them defeat Port Vale amongst others before finally hosting Cheslea at the McCain Stadium. Chelsea were able to out power Scarborough, but only just. A goal from John Terry was the only goal in the game, in which Marcelle played the entire 90 minutes. Marcelle went on to chalk up over 30 appearances with the club, but left the club at the end of the season, with his contract expired, Scarborough were more tangled up in searching for a manager to replace the departed Russell Slade.

=== Grimsby Town ===
In a reward for his consistency in the previous season, Slade contacted Marcelle again and was invited for a pre-season trial with his new club Grimsby Town. Following a trial month, in which Marcelle never really got a look in, in any of the teams friendly games, he was still offered a short-term deal and joined Ashley Sestanovich and Glen Downey as one of three players taken to Blundell Park from his former club. Grimsby was to be his first professional football club in two years. Despite being offered a contract, Marcelle found it extremely hard to break into the team and was often looked past in favour for Michael Reddy, Andy Parkinson and Darren Mansaram, and would often find it very difficult on winning a place on the substitute bench. Marcelle made his only start for the Mariners against Carlisle United in the Football League Trophy, and following only four other sub appearances, Marcelle would not play again for Grimsby. Slade decided to bring in two more strikers in Martin Gritton and Colin Cramb, and that coupled with loan signings such as Jon Daly and Chris Williams, Marcelle was eventually released by Grimsby on 31 October 2004.

=== Tamworth ===
Marcelle would find it extremely hard to find a new club, and it wasn't until March that he finally signed with a new club. Following an impressive trial he joined Conference side Tamworth who gave Marcelle a contract until the end of the 2004–05 season. He went on to make nine appearances for Tamworth and was released at the end of the season.

=== Gainsborough Trinity ===
After training with several non-League clubs in the summer of 2005, Marcelle was given a short-term contract by Gainsborough Trinity, but after a few games at The Northolme he was unable to dislodge Dave Reeves and Jonathan Rowan as the first choice attacking force available to manager Paul Mitchell. It was not long before Trinity would release him.

=== Armthorpe Welfare ===
Upon leaving Trinity, he dropped even further down the English league system to sign with Armthorpe Welfare. He would play a brief part for the club, but notably formed a short strike partnership with David Soames, who he had played with at Grimsby. Marcelle left Armthorpe by mutual consent before the close of the 2005–06 season. He subsequently retired from playing therefore after.

== Managerial career ==
Following his mutual decision to leave Armthorpe, Marcelle's retirement would see him leave England and return to his native Trinidad and Tobago and entered into management. He managed the North East Stars from 2007 until 2010 before opening his own football academy.
