= Darren Mansaram =

English footballer who plays as a striker for Armthorpe Welfare

Personal information
- Full name: Darren Timothy Mansaram
- Date of birth: 25 June 1984 (age 42)
- Place of birth: Doncaster, England
- Position: Striker

Youth career
- 1999–2002: Grimsby Town

Senior career*
Years	Team	Apps	(Gls)
2002–2005	Grimsby Town	73	(6)
2004	→ Halifax Town (loan)	10	(4)
2005–2006	Halifax Town	10	(3)
2005	→ York City (loan)	5	(0)
2005	→ Tamworth (loan)	7	(1)
2005	→ Worksop Town (loan)	?	(?)
2006	Sligo Rovers	?	(7)
2006–2008	Bohemians	35	(5)
2008	Leigh Genesis	8	(3)
2009	Retford United	?	(?)
2009	Dundalk	31	(5)
2009–2010	Gainsborough Trinity	4	(0)
2010	Droylsden	1	(0)
2010–2012	Armthorpe Welfare		
2012	Brigg Town		
2012	Armthorpe Welfare		
2012	Arnold Town		
2012–2016	Armthorpe Welfare		
2016–2017	Rainworth Miners Welfare		
2017–2020	Armthorpe Welfare		
- * Club domestic league appearances and goals as of 1 June 2008

Darren Timothy Mansaram (born 25 June 1984) is an English former professional footballer who played as a striker.

He notably played as a professional for Grimsby Town where he started his career in 2002 going on to appear for The Mariners in the second, third and fourth tier of English football before his departure in 2005. He has also spent time playing in the League of Ireland Premier League for Sligo Rovers, Bohemians and Dundalk. He has since made his trade in England's Non-League game for Halifax Town, York City, Tamworth, Worksop Town, Leigh Genesis, Retford United, Gainsborough Trinity, Droylsden, Armthorpe Welfare, Brigg Town, Arnold Town and Rainworth Miners Welfare.

== Career ==
=== Grimsby Town ===
Mansaram began his career at Grimsby Town progressing through the youth ranks before being promoted to the first team towards the end of the 2001–02 season, whilst Town were competing in what is now the Football League Championship. He came into the squad with a good goal scoring record for both the reserve side and youth sides and it wasn't long before he made his break got his break within the first team. During the 2002–03 season, Town manager Paul Groves had been dealt several blows by the loss of loanee Steve Kabba as well as injuries to other forwards such as Michael Boulding while Phil Jevons was loaned out for financial reasons, this in turn saw Groves forced to select inexperienced youngsters such as Mansaram and David Soames. Despite impressing in the final half of the season, Mansaram was powerless in helping Grimsby avoid relegation from the First Division, however by the end of the season his performances had meant he was now considered as a first team regular. During the summer months he drew interest from Sheffield Wednesday but no concrete offer came in and the young striker nicknamed 'Flash' due to his lightning pace up front, stayed on at Blundell Park. Paul Groves eventually lost his job in February 2004 and was replaced by Nicky Law who in turn chopped and changed the Grimsby squad meaning signings such as Isaiah Rankin meant that Mansaram by the end of that season had found himself only playing a cameo role within the first team. Following a second successive relegation the Grimsby board installed another new manager in Russell Slade, and Mansaram now out of contract was kept on at the club during pre-season on a trial basis but despite being initially told he wasn't going to be offered a new deal he eventually signed on a 6-month deal. During the 2004–05 season, he was loaned out to Conference National side Halifax Town, and eventually moved to the club on a free transfer.

=== Halifax Town ===
Mansaram failed to make a break into the first team and found himself loaned out to Halifax Town before signing a permanent deal and joining fellow Mariner Greg Young at The Shay at the same time. Mansaram broke into the Town team but soon his performances became more rare and he was loaned out to, York City and later on Tamworth before also making a brief spell with Worksop Town.

=== Sligo Rovers and Bohemians ===
Mansaram was then convinced by Sean Connor who brought him to Ireland where he signed for Sligo Rovers. He went on to be the club's top scorer in the 2006 campaign.

When Connor moved to Bohemians, he made Mansaram one of his first signings. He scored his first goals for the club when scoring twice in the League Cup win over Bray Wanderers on 17 April 2007. Mansaram left Bohemians on 3 July 2008 having failed to play regular football in his second season at Bohs after the arrival of Jason Byrne and made a move back to England.

=== Leigh Genesis and Retford United ===
Darren's next port of call was to sign for non-league club Leigh Genesis, who had formed out of the old Conference club Leigh RMI. Mansaram was able to score three times for the club, before Leigh's wealthy benefactors pulled the plug in late 2009. Darren briefly played for Retford United F.C. before confirming a move back to Ireland.

=== Dundalk ===
In January 2009 Mansaram joined up with former manager Sean Connor at newly promoted Dundalk He spent one season at Oriel Park but scored only five goals. His physical presence and ability to hold the ball quickly made him a fans favourite. Dundalk fans regularly sang his name to the tune Que Sera, Sera. However, when Connor left Dundalk, Mansaram was not offered a new deal. On 4 December 2009 he joined Gainsborough Trinity on trial.

=== Return to Non-league ===
Mansaram completed his move to Trinity on 10 December 2009 on a non contract basis. After four games for The Blues, Mansaram was released on 12 February 2010. Mansaram Signed for fellow Conference North side Droylsden, on 26 February 2010, making only a single appearance for the club before being released. Mansaram signed for Armthorpe Welfare in the ninth tier of English football in the summer of 2010. Mansaram finished the 2010–11 season as the club's top scorer, and was the club's top scorer in the 2011–12 season until his departure.

Mansaram joined Brigg Town in February 2012, but was released at the end of the 2011–12 season. He re-signed in September 2012 but moved to return to Armthorpe 2 games later. In November 2012 he joined Arnold Town before making a third return to Armthorpe on 20 December. He later moved back to Armthorpe for a fourth spell after a brief spell with Rainworth Miners Welfare.
