= Graham Hockless =

English footballer

Personal information
- Date of birth: 20 October 1982 (age 44)
- Place of birth: Hull, England
- Position: Midfielder

Youth career
- 2000–2001: Hull City

Senior career*
Years	Team	Apps	(Gls)
2001–2005	Grimsby Town	20	(2)
2004	→ Leigh RMI (loan)	2	(0)
2005–2006	North Ferriby United	28	(2)
2006–2007	Richmond	40	(3)
2008–2009	Heidelberg United	43	(13)
2010–2012	Green Gully Cavaliers	54	(12)
2013	Port Melbourne Sharks	20	(6)
Total		207	(38)
- * Club domestic league appearances and goals as of 11 October 2013

Graham Hockless (born 20 October 1982) is an English football coach and former professional player who played as a midfielder from 2001 to 2013.

Having come through the youth ranks at Hull City, he switched to Grimsby Town in 2001 and went on to play at every level of the Football League. While with The Mariners he spent time on loan with Leigh RMI before joining North Ferriby United. In 2006, he emigrated to Australia, where he has since forged a career as a semi-professional with Richmond, Heidelberg United, Green Gully Cavaliers and the Port Melbourne Sharks.

== Playing career ==
=== Grimsby Town ===
Hockless was brought through the youth ranks at his hometown club of Hull City but despite being a regular in the clubs, youth and reserve teams in 2000, he was allowed to join Grimsby Town on a free transfer along with Chris Bolder.

The Mariners at the time, were playing in the First Division three divisions higher than Hull so the youngster had taken a big step up in joining them. In his first season, Graham failed to make a single appearance for the club and spent the season in the reserve side. It wasn't until 18 months after signing for the club that he made his debut against Reading. Grimsby would end up relegated at the end of the 2002–03 season

In the following season manager Paul Groves gave Hockless more of a chance within the first team, and after playing in a handful of games he began to become a regular with his performances making an impact in the team as well. In the second to last game of the season Hockless came to prominence when his curling cross setup Isaiah Rankin to score a last gasp winner against Brentford to take the 2003–04 relegation battle down to the last day of the season.

Grimsby were unable to avoid relegation after suffering a 2–1 defeat against Tranmere Rovers on the final day of the 2003–04 season, thus meaning the club and Graham's second successive relegation. Hockless went on to receive the "Supporters Young Player Of The Season Award" . This was something that would attract other clubs in summer 2004, and rumours circulated in the local media that Sheffield Wednesday and former club Hull City (who were now in a higher league than Grimsby) were to swoop for Graham in the transfer window. Despite the interest, Hockless committed himself to the club and signed a one-year contract extension..

Russell Slade took over as the club's manager for the start of the 2004–05 season but rarely included Hockless, and despite confusion for his prolonged absence by the club's supporters the player was constantly looked past in favour of players such as Thomas Pinault and Ashley Sestanovich. Hockless was eventually allowed to leave the club on loan and joined Conference National outfit Leigh RMI, but after featuring in only 2 games for Leigh he returned to Grimsby.

=== North Ferriby United ===
In June 2005, Hockless left Town and signed for non league side North Ferriby United, which was too come as a shock for many following the players rumoured transfer activity 12 months earlier. Chris Bolder the player who joined Grimsby from Hull with him in 2001 also made the move too North Ferriby following a season with Ossett Town.

=== Australia ===
After one full season with United, Hockless emigrated to Australia signing for Richmond SC before moving to Heidelberg United in 2008 where he picked up the gold medal for the best player in the Victorian Premier League. In 2010, he signed for Green Gully Cavaliers and later moved on to the Port Melbourne Sharks in 2013.

== Coaching career ==
Hockless retired from playing in 2013 and spent the 2014 season as assistant coach of South Melbourne FC.

== Honours ==
Grimsby Town

- Supporters Young Player of the Year: 2003–04

Personal

- Victorian Premier League Gold Medal Winner (VPL Player of the Year): 2008
