= Greg Young (footballer) =

English association football player (born 1983)

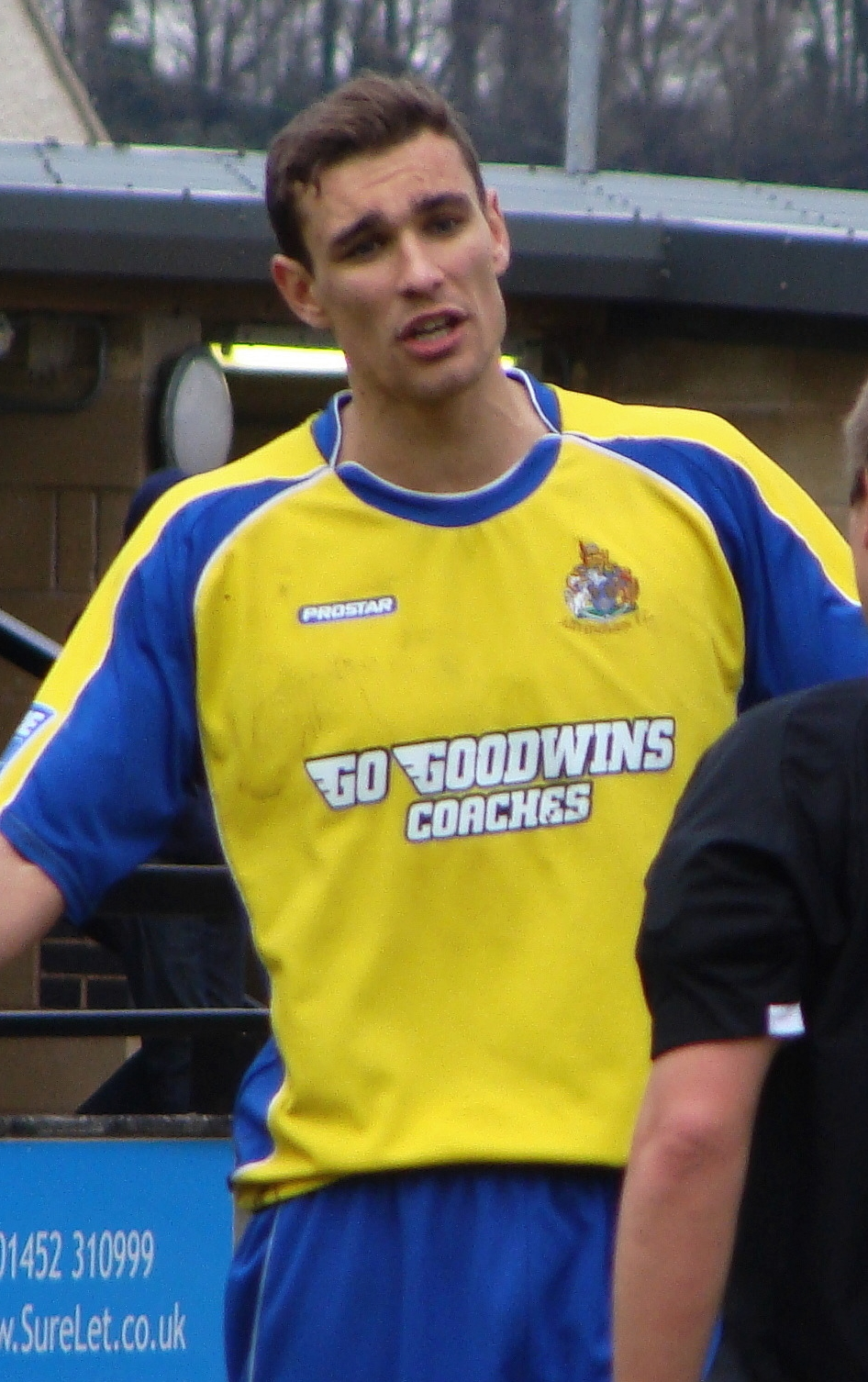
- Young playing for Altrincham in 2010

Personal information
- Full name: Gregory James Young
- Date of birth: 25 April 1983 (age 43)
- Place of birth: Doncaster, England
- Height: 6 ft 3 in (1.91 m)
- Position: Centre back

Team information
- Current team: Rossington Main

Youth career
- –2002: Sheffield Wednesday

Senior career*
Years	Team	Apps	(Gls)
2002–2005	Grimsby Town	24	(0)
2004	→ Northwich Victoria (loan)	3	(1)
2004–2005	→ Northwich Victoria (loan)	3	(0)
2005–2008	Halifax Town	65	(3)
2006	→ Northwich Victoria (loan)	3	(0)
2007	→ Alfreton Town (loan)	6	(0)
2008–2010	Altrincham	107	(8)
2010–2011	York City	12	(1)
2011	→ Altrincham (loan)	11	(1)
2011–2012	Alfreton Town	30	(0)
2012–2014	Gainsborough Trinity	60	(3)
2014–2018	Buxton		
2018–2019	Frickley Athletic	23	(2)
2019–2020	Mickleover Sports	26	(1)
2020–2021	Grantham Town		
2021–	Rossington Main		

Managerial career
- 2024–: Rossington Main
- * Club domestic league appearances and goals as of 13:42, 21 April 2020 (UTC)

Gregory James Young (born 25 April 1983) is an English professional footballer who plays as a centre back for Rossington Main, where he is also the clubs manager.

Young started his career with Sheffield Wednesday's youth system and after being released in 2002 he joined Grimsby Town of the First Division. He made his first-team debut on the last day of the 2002–03 season with the team having already been relegated. Young suffered a second relegation the following season, in which he made 19 appearances. In 2004–05, he spent two periods on loan at Conference National club Northwich Victoria before joining Halifax Town in 2005.

He made 35 appearances for Halifax in 2005–06 and started in the 2006 Conference National play-off final at the Walkers Stadium, which was lost to Hereford United. Following loans with former club Northwich and Conference North club Alfreton Town, he joined Altrincham in early 2008. He played for Altrincham as a semi-professional and after making over 100 appearances in two and a half seasons joined York City in 2010. After a season at the club he returned to Alfreton and has since played for Gainsborough Trinity, Buxton, Frickley Athletic, Mickleover Sports and Grantham Town.

== Career ==
=== Grimsby Town ===
Born in Doncaster, South Yorkshire, Young started his career with the Sheffield Wednesday youth system. He was released at the end of the 2001–02 season, and was signed by fellow First Division club Grimsby Town on 26 July 2002 following a trial, initially playing in the reserve team. He made his first-team debut by starting in a 2–1 away defeat to Reading on 26 April 2003, the last day of 2002–03, with Grimsby having already been relegated to the Second Division. He signed a new contract with Grimsby on 3 June 2003, with manager Paul Groves saying "Greg has improved since he arrived at the club. He did well on his debut at Reading, but it did show that there is a big step up from the reserves for him to make."

His first appearance of 2003–04 came as a half-time substitute in a 1–0 away victory over Blackpool on 30 September 2003. This season saw him initially used as a stand-in left back as cover for injuries, but after the arrival of Nicky Law as manager, he became a regular starter as a centre back. Young was described as the "stand-out performer" in a 4–4 draw away to Chesterfield on 27 March 2004, despite suffering a dislocated shoulder during the match. He made a "brave" return in the final match of the season on 8 May 2004, a 2–1 defeat away to Tranmere Rovers, which condemned Grimsby to relegation to League Two. He finished the season with 19 appearances for Grimsby and signed a new two-year contract with the club in June 2004.

He was still suffering from the shoulder injury in June 2004, and under new manager Russell Slade, Young endured a frustrating spell. A cold he was suffering from in August 2004 required treatment from physio Dave Moore as it put him out of action. Young joined Conference National club Northwich Victoria on 7 October 2004 on a one-month loan, having made five appearances for Grimsby up to that point in 2004–05. He made his debut two days later in a 0–0 away draw with Crawley Town. On 23 October 2014, he scored his first goal for Northwich in a 3–1 away victory over Forest Green Rovers with a close-range shot. He was recalled by Grimsby later that month due to injuries after making three appearances for Northwich. He rejoined Northwich on 3 December 2004 on another one-month loan, with injury restricting him to three appearances before returning to Grimsby on 6 January 2005.

=== Halifax Town ===
Young signed for Conference National club Halifax Town on 25 February 2005 a free transfer on a one-and-a-half-year contract. He made his debut the following day as a 57th-minute substitute in a 2–2 home draw with former club Northwich. His first goal for the club came on his sixth appearance against Tamworth after heading in a Martin Foster corner kick, the match ending in a 3–3 home draw. He finished the season with 13 appearances and 2 goals for Halifax. Young suffered an injury in August 2005 and made his return in a 4–0 home win over Tamworth on 10 September 2005. His only goal of 2005–06 came after heading in from a Matt Doughty corner in the 35th minute of a 1–1 home draw with Stevenage Borough on 14 April 2006. He played in both legs of Halifax's play-off semi-final victory over Grays Athletic, which the team won 5–4 on aggregate. He started in the 2006 Conference National play-off final at the Walkers Stadium on 20 May, being substituted on 61 minutes, which Halifax lost 3–2 to Hereford United after extra time. He finished the season with 35 appearances and 1 goal.

He was affected by a shoulder injury towards the end of the season and had a successful operation on this in May 2006. After recovering, Young made his return in a 2–1 victory away to Cambridge United on 29 August 2006. He joined Northwich for the third time in November 2006 on a one-month loan, having made eight appearances for Halifax up to that point in 2006–07. He made three appearances for Northwich before being recalled by Halifax on 18 December 2006. He made three appearances after returning but his season was ended due to a knee injury sustained on 1 January 2007 in a 1–1 home draw with Altrincham, having made 11 appearances for Halifax that season.

He joined Conference North club Alfreton Town in August 2007 on a one-month loan, making his debut and return from injury in a 2–1 defeat at home to Southport on 18 August. He made six appearances before returning to Halifax on 18 September 2007. He made an immediate return to the team after coming on as a substitute on 88 minutes in a 1–1 home draw with Rushden & Diamonds on 22 September 2007.

=== Altrincham ===
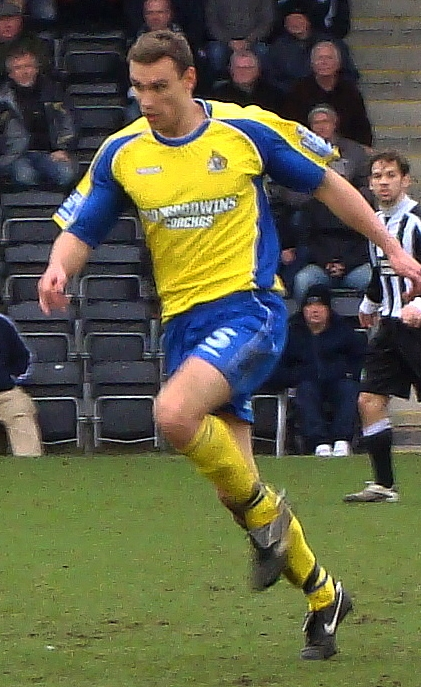
Young playing for Altrincham in 2010

Young was released by Halifax while they were enduring financial difficulties and on 4 January 2008 signed for Altrincham as a semi-professional on a contract until the end of 2007–08. He made his debut a day later as a 60th-minute substitute in a 4–0 defeat away to Oxford United and his full debut came after starting in a 2–1 home victory over Kidderminster Harriers on 8 January 2008. His only goal of the season came from the edge of the penalty area in a 2–1 defeat away to Burton Albion on 8 April 2008. He finished the season with 22 appearances and 1 goal for Altrincham and signed a new two-year contract in the summer of 2008.

Young played for Altrincham in their FA Cup first round match and first round replay against League Two team Luton Town, with the latter being lost 4–2 in a penalty shoot-out. His first goal of 2008–09 came after scoring from close range in the 74th minute of a 1–0 away victory over Northwich on 26 December 2008. His second goal of the season came with a header from Doughty's free kick on 52 minutes in a 1–0 away win over Wrexham on 13 April 2009, a result that ensured Altrincham would not finish the season in the relegation zone. He finished the season with 51 appearances and 2 goals.

He contracted mumps in September 2009 and made his return to action against Rushden on 3 October. Young's first goal of 2009–10 came was a close-range finish from a corner on 70 minutes in a 1–0 home win over Wrexham in an FA Trophy first round replay on 15 December 2009. His first league goal of the season came after scoring in a 2–1 victory away to Ebbsfleet United on 16 January 2010 with a header from a Doughty corner. He finished the season with 44 appearances and 6 goals.

=== York City ===
Young joined Altrincham's Conference Premier rivals York City on 24 May 2010 on a one-year contract and so returned to playing full-time. He made his debut in a 2–1 loss away to Fleetwood Town on 30 August 2010, scoring York's only goal in the 87th minute with a header from an Alex Lawless cross. After initially being used as an outfield substitute, Young played in goal for the second half of York's 5–0 away defeat to Luton Town on 18 January 2011, conceding one goal, after Michael Ingham was sent off in the 15th minute.

Young returned to former club Altrincham on 7 February 2011 on an emergency loan until the end of 2010–11. His first appearance after returning to the club came in a 2–1 defeat away to Kidderminster on 12 February 2011. After making 11 appearances and scoring 1 goal for Altrincham, Young returned to York after being recalled on 20 April 2011 due to an injury to Daniel Parslow. He did not play following his return and finished the season with 12 appearances and 1 goal for York.

=== Later career ===
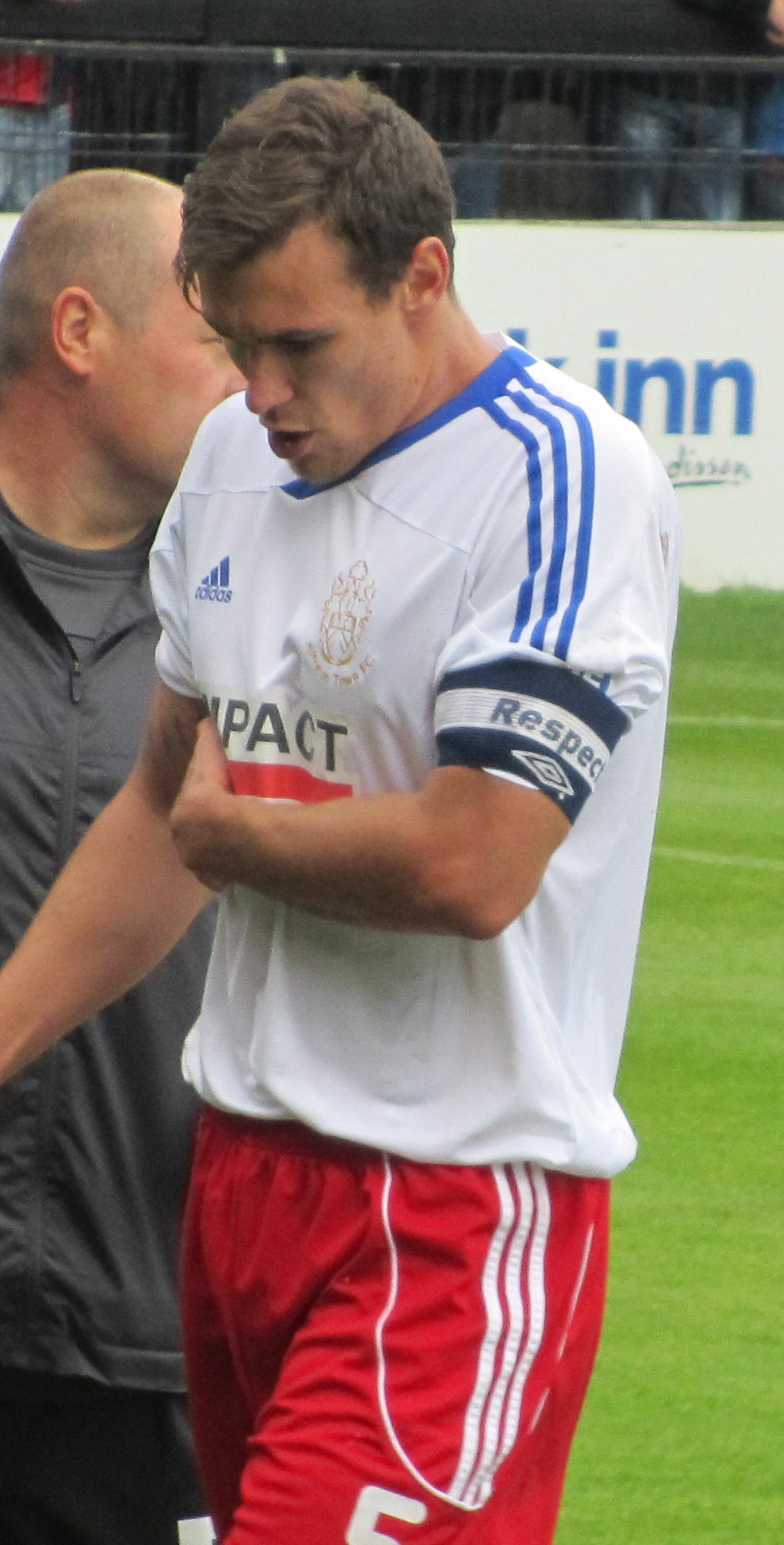
Young playing for Alfreton Town in 2011

Young signed a two-year contract with former club Alfreton Town, who had recently been promoted to the Conference Premier, on 1 June 2011. He finished 2011–12 with 35 appearances for Alfreton. On 14 June 2012, Young signed for Conference North club Gainsborough Trinity and made his debut in their 2012–13 opening day 1–0 defeat at home to Gloucester City on 18 August.

Young signed with Buxton of the Northern Premier League Premier Division on 6 July 2014. He made 47 appearances and scored 6 goals as Buxton finished 10th in the table in 2014–15. Young dropped down a division in December 2018 to take on a player-coach role with Northern Premier League Division One East club Frickley Athletic under former Buxton manager Martin McIntosh. He signed for Northern Premier League Premier Division club Mickleover Sports on 3 July 2019. He had made 27 appearances and scored 3 goals in all competitions by the time the 2019–20 season was abandoned and results expunged because of the COVID-19 pandemic in England. Young signed for Mickleover's divisional rivals Grantham Town on 30 March 2020 as a player-coach.

For the 2021–22 season, Young joined Rossington Main.

In 2024, Gregg was appointed Rossington Main manager following a competitive selection process which involved multiple candidates, but no high-profile ones.

== Style of play ==
Young primarily plays as a left-footed centre back and is also able to play at left back. While at Altrincham, he was also deployed as an auxiliary striker. While being a "classy centre-half", he is an "aggressive player who likes to win the ball" and his play has been described as "shackling". On his goalscoring record, Young said "It's something I have worked on in my own game during the last couple of years. I made a point of improving my scoring record and I've done that slightly" in 2010.

== Personal life ==
Young studied for a degree in sport and exercise science at university while playing part-time for Altrincham. Greg is now Player+Manager for Rossington Main FC

== Career statistics ==
As of end of 2013–14 season

Appearances and goals by club, season and competition
Club	Season	League			FA Cup		League Cup		Other		Total	
Club	Season	Division	Apps	Goals	Apps	Goals	Apps	Goals	Apps	Goals	Apps	Goals
Grimsby Town	2002–03	First Division	1	0	0	0	0	0	—		1	0
Grimsby Town	2003–04	Second Division	17	0	1	0	0	0	1 (Note: Appearance in Football League Trophy)	0	19	0
Grimsby Town	2004–05	League Two	6	0	0	0	1	0	1	0	8	0
Grimsby Town	Total		24	0	1	0	1	0	2	0	28	0
Northwich Victoria (loan)	2004–05	Conference National	6	1	—		—		—		6	1
Halifax Town	2004–05	Conference National	13	2	—		—		—		13	2
Halifax Town	2005–06	Conference National	30	1	0	0	—		5 (Note: Two appearances in Football League Trophy, three in Conference National play-offs)	0	35	1
Halifax Town	2006–07	Conference National	11	0	0	0	—		0	0	11	0
Halifax Town	2007–08	Conference Premier	11	0	3	0	—		1 (Note: Appearance in Conference League Cup)	0	15	0
Halifax Town	Total		65	3	3	0	—		6	0	74	3
Northwich Victoria (loan)	2006–07	Conference National	3	0	—		—		—		3	0
Alfreton Town (loan)	2007–08	Conference North	6	0	—		—		—		6	0
Altrincham	2007–08	Conference Premier	22	1	—		—		—		22	1
Altrincham	2008–09	Conference Premier	45	2	3	0	—		3 (Note: Two appearances in Conference League Cup, one in FA Trophy)	0	51	2
Altrincham	2009–10	Conference Premier	40	5	1	0	—		3 (Note: Appearance(s) in FA Trophy)	1	44	6
Altrincham	Total		107	8	4	0	—		6	1	117	9
York City	2010–11	Conference Premier	12	1	0	0	—		0	0	12	1
Altrincham (loan)	2010–11	Conference Premier	11	1	—		—		—		11	1
Alfreton Town	2011–12	Conference Premier	30	0	2	0	—		3	0	35	0
Gainsborough Trinity	2012–13	Conference North	26	2	1	0	—		4	0	31	2
Gainsborough Trinity	2013–14	Conference North	34	1	1	0	—		1	0	36	1
Gainsborough Trinity	Total		60	3	2	0	—		5	0	67	3
Career total			324	17	12	0	1	0	22	1	359	18
