= Sestanovich =

Sestanovich is a Slavic surname. Notable people with the surname include:

- Ashley Sestanovich (born 1981), English footballer
- Stephen Sestanovich (born 1950), American government official, academic, and author
