= Paul Robinson (footballer, born 1984) =

English footballer

Personal information
- Date of birth: 28 May 1984 (age 42)
- Place of birth: Newcastle upon Tyne, England
- Positions: Midfielder; forward

Team information
- Current team: North Shields

Youth career
- 1998–2000: Newcastle United
- 2000–2002: Tranmere Rovers

Senior career*
Years	Team	Apps	(Gls)
2002–2004	Tranmere Rovers	0	(0)
2003	→ Vauxhall Motors (loan)		
2004	→ Grimsby Town (loan)	2	(0)
2004–2005	York City		
2005–2006	Bedlington Terriers		
2006–2007	Newcastle Blue Star		
2007–2013	Whitley Bay		
2013	Darlington 1883		
2013–2014	Blyth Spartans	29	(3)
2014–2015	Whitley Bay		
2015–2016	Blyth Spartans		
2016–2017	Morpeth Town		
2017–	North Shields		
- * Club domestic league appearances and goals as of 21:42, 30 December 2009 (UTC)

Paul Robinson (born 28 May 1984) is an English professional footballer who plays as a forward for North Shields.

He notably played in the Football League for Grimsby Town, where he was on loan from Tranmere Rovers. He left Rovers in 2004 having failed to make an appearance and went on to feature for Vauxhall Motors, York City, Bedlington Terriers, Newcastle Blue Star and Whitley Bay.

== Career ==
Robinson was associated with his home-town club Newcastle United as a schoolboy, then moved to Tranmere Rovers as a 16-year-old. He turned professional in 2002, spent time on loan to Vauxhall Motors of the Northern Premier League, and scored well in youth and reserve team football, but in August 2003 was allowed to join Football League Two club York City on a two-game trial with a view to a possible loan or permanent move. An ankle injury cut short the trial and the player returned to Prenton Park.

In September 2004, Grimsby Town manager Russell Slade signed Robinson on a one-month loan. Slade also signed Jon Daly and Chris Williams from Stockport County. As all three players were forwards, this meant the club had six forwards under contract. Robinson got his chance at Blundell Park; he made his full professional debut on 11 September 2004, playing the whole of a 3–1 defeat against Macclesfield Town. He played twice more for the Mariners, each time finishing on the losing side, and then returned to Tranmere.

Unable to hold down a place in Tranmere's reserves, Robinson returned to York City, by then a Conference club, on trial in November 2004. While the trial continued, Tranmere released the player, who then signed a short-term contract with York City. York City's squad already contained the former Newcastle United striker Paul Robinson, who was listed as Paul D Robinson to avoid confusion.

Robinson was released at the end of the season and returned to his native north-east of England, where he joined Bedlington Terriers of the Northern League, the club for which his brother Michael was playing. In the 2006 close season he signed for Northern League champions Newcastle Blue Star, and a year later moved on to Whitley Bay of Northern League Division One. In 2009, he was part of the team that beat Glossop North End in the final of the FA Vase at Wembley, having lost at the semi-final stage the previous year. Robinson returned to Wembley the following season having scored a dramatic last minute winning goal in the semi-final against Barwell, and scored the 5th goal in a 6–1 rout of Wroxham. Robinson ended the season winning the BBC Radio Newcastle player of the year award, and also added Goal of the Season, Fans player of the Season, Players player of the Season and Player of the year at the annual Whitley Bay presentation evening, to his ever-growing list of individual trophies, this as well as finishing runner up in the Northern League Player of the year awards. In 2012 it was announced that Robinson would captain the side in 2012–2013 season. He joined Darlington 1883 in May 2013, and Blyth Spartans in November 2013.

Robinson has since gone on to have two spells with Blyth Spartans sandwiching a second spell with Whitley before moving on to Morpeth Town and North Shields.
