= Glen Downey =

English footballer

Personal information
- Full name: Glen Downey
- Date of birth: 20 September 1978 (age 48)
- Place of birth: Newcastle, England
- Position: Defender

Youth career
- Hartlepool United

Senior career*
Years	Team	Apps	(Gls)
1997–2000	Hartlepool United	0	(0)
2000	→ Bishop Auckland (loan)	34	(1)
2000	→ Gateshead (loan)	8	(0)
2001–2002	Shelbourne	0	(0)
2002	→ Newry City (loan)		
2002–2003	Spennymoor United		
2003–2004	Scarborough	15	(1)
2004–2006	Grimsby Town	2	(1)
2006–2007	Worksop Town		
- * Club domestic league appearances and goals as of 08:04, 18 May 2006 (UTC) ‡ National team caps and goals as of 08:04, 18 May 2006 (UTC)

Glen Downey (born 20 September 1978) is an English former professional footballer who played as a defender from 1997 to 2007.

He notably played in the Football League for Grimsby Town, having also had spells with Hartlepool United, Bishop Auckland, Spennymoor United, Gateshead, Shelbourne, Newry City, Scarborough and Worksop Town.

== Career ==
Downey started his career as a trainee at Hartlepool United in 1997 but in three years with the club he had failed to make a single first team appearance and was released in 2000. He then moved into Non-League whilst having a brief loan spells with Bishop Auckland and Gateshead before moving to Ireland where he featured for Shelbourne and Newry City. He then joined Conference National side Scarborough in 2003. He had struggled to make an impact with The Seadogs, and following his release in 2004 he was surprisingly signed up for Football League Two side Grimsby Town by Russell Slade, his manager at Scarborough. Originally signed as defensive cover, he was given a new one-year deal a year later despite the fact he only played 14 minutes in his first season with The Mariners.

In his first appearance of the 05–06 season Downey impressed after replacing the injured Rob Jones in the impressive 1-0 Football League Cup victory away against Derby County. In his only league appearance of that season on New Year's Eve, he came on as substitute and scored an 84th-minute winner against Wrexham in a game where both Grimsby centre backs Simon Ramsden and Rob Jones departed through injury. Downey had played at left back as part of a makeshift back four with regular left back Tom Newey moving to centre back to partner striker Gary Jones.

Despite earning several plaudits in all 3 of his appearances for the club, Downey was released and joined Conference North side Worksop Town at the start of the 2006–07 season. This was only to be a brief spell and he departed after playing only a handful of games. Following his release from Worksop he was never to sign again with a club at neither professional or semi-professional terms, and despite never officially announcing his retirement from the sport he would never play competitive football again,

== Personal life ==
Downey's younger brother Gareth was also a professional footballer who played as a goalkeeper. Like Glen he was on the books for Hartlepool United, Shelbourne, and Scarborough. Downey now runs a chain of Fish and Chips shops with his brother in Wearside.
