= Clément Pinault =

French footballer (1985-2009)

Personal information
- Date of birth: 4 February 1985
- Place of birth: Grasse, France
- Date of death: 22 January 2009 (aged 23)
- Place of death: Clermont, France
- Height: 1.86 m (6 ft 1 in)
- Position: Defender

Youth career
- 2000–2004: Le Mans

Senior career*
Years	Team	Apps	(Gls)
2004–2008	Le Mans	10	(0)
2006–2007	→ Angers (loan)	26	(0)
2008–2009	Clermont	9	(0)
Total		45	(0)
- * Club domestic league appearances and goals

Clément Pinault (4 February 1985 – 22 January 2009) was a French professional footballer who played as a defender.

== Career ==
Born in Grasse, Alpes-Maritimes, Pinault began his career with Le Mans UC72. He on loan to Angers SCO in the summer of 2006. Pinault joined Clermont Foot from Ligue 1 side Le Mans in June 2008.

== Personal life ==
He was the brother of footballer Thomas Pinault.

== Death ==
Pinault suffered a heart attack at home on 18 January 2009 and was taken to hospital where was placed in an artificial coma. He died four days later, after being taken off life support.

Pinault had played for Clermont two days before his heart attack, in a 2–0 Ligue 2 win over Brest, "without any warning signs".
