= Wes Parker (footballer) =

English footballer

Personal information
- Full name: Wesley Jaye Parker
- Date of birth: 7 December 1983 (age 42)
- Place of birth: Skegness, England
- Position: Defender

Youth career
- 1999–2002: Grimsby Town

Senior career*
Years	Team	Apps	(Gls)
2002–2004	Grimsby Town	9	(0)
2004–2008	Gainsborough Trinity	107	(17)
2008–2009	Boston United	31	(1)
2009–2010	Gainsborough Trinity	30	(2)
2010–2017	Wealdstone	251	(25)
2017	→ Hayes & Yeading United (loan)	4	(1)
2017	Wingate & Finchley	0	(0)
Total		431	(46)
- * Club domestic league appearances and goals

Wesley Jaye Parker (born 7 December 1983) is an English former footballer who played as a defender.

He notably played in the Football League for Grimsby Town from 2002 until 2004 before moving on to play for Gainsborough Trinity, and Boston United. He spent seven years for Wealdstone before briefly joining Wingate & Finchley.

== Career ==
=== Grimsby Town ===
Parker was a product of the Grimsby Town youth setup and made his move into the first team in October 2002 when the club were playing in the First Division. Parker and striker David Soames were promoted into the first team following injuries to senior players and would go on to make his first team debut under manager Paul Groves, who with first team defenders Steve Chettle, Georges Santos, John McDermott and Darren Barnard in the Mariners squad, Parker had a collective group of veteran role models to follow. In his most notable appearance for the club, Parker was drafted in to make a substitute appearance on Boxing Day 2002 when the club played against Derby County at Pride Park . With the majority of Grimsby's regular back four side lined through injury, Parker came on to replace Terry Cooke in a game in which he marked former Manchester City legend Georgi Kinkladze out of the game. Goals from David Soames and a double from John Oster polished off Derby in a 3–1 victory. Grimsby were relegated from the First Division in the 2002–2003 season and in the 2003–2004 season Parker failed to make an impact under Groves and his later replacement Nicky Law. After making only four appearances in his second season with The Mariners, Parker was released at the end of the 2003–04 season.

=== Gainsborough Trinity ===
As a free agent Parker initially struggled to find a club, and after a trial with Scarborough and a short spell with Brigg Town, he decided to join Conference North side Gainsborough Trinity. Parker was soon joined by younger brother Liam who had been released at youth level by Grimsby following the end of his youth scholarship. Wes played four seasons with Gainsborough, and was ever present when the club reached the first round of the FA Cup on three occasions missing out against York City, Barnet and Hartlepool United. Despite transfer speculation linking him with a move to York City, it was local rivals Boston United who finally secured his signature when he made the switch to South Lincolnshire in May 2008.

=== Boston United ===
Almost immediately after his move to Boston, the club were demoted from the Conference North league to the Northern Premier League for financial irregularities, and instant speculation to Parker's future was soon put about. Gainsborough boss Steve Charles who had just lost Parker to Boston attempted to instantly bring him back to The Northolme, but Wes deciding against the move to commit himself to his contract and agreed to stay at York Street. Younger brother Liam also followed him to Boston as did the third Parker brother MaCauley who joined the club's youth system. Following the conclusion of the 2008–2009 season Parker was one of several players released by the club's new management staff.

=== Return to Gainsborough ===
On 29 May 2009 Parker re-joined Gainsborough Trinity for the second time in his career. Initially a first team regular again with The Blues, Parker lost his way in the team when Brian Little was appointed manager by the club's new chairman Peter Swann. Trinity had seen an influx of new signings flow into the club as Little made full use of his chairman's large cash boost. Eventually by the end of the 2009–10 season Parker's contract was not renewed.

=== Wealdstone ===
After initially signing for Isthmian League Premier Division side Horsham, Parker signed a contract with Horsham's league rivals Wealdstone. He has since been made captain of the team, leading his team to victories against Barrow and Cambridge in the FA Trophy 2011–12 as Wealdstone made a run to the semi-finals of the competition only to lose to Newport county 3–1. Parker made his 100th appearance for Wealdstone on 23 October 2012 in a Middlesex Charity Cup tie against Bedfont & Feltham.

== Personal life ==
Parker is the eldest of three brothers who have all played football but he is the only to have spent time as a full professional. Liam was snubbed a professional contract and was released by Grimsby Town as a youngster, he has since turned out for Boston Town and Boston United. Macauley has spent time with Boston United, and Skegness Town.

Wesley is married to English Brand Director Charlotte Parker (née Pickering).
