= Simon Ramsden =

English footballer

Personal information
- Full name: Simon Paul Ramsden
- Date of birth: 17 December 1981 (age 44)
- Place of birth: Bishop Auckland, England
- Height: 6 ft 0 in (1.83 m)
- Position: Defender

Youth career
- Newton Aycliffe Youth Centre
- Sunderland

Senior career*
Years	Team	Apps	(Gls)
2001–2004	Sunderland	1	(0)
2002–2003	→ Notts County (loan)	31	(0)
2004–2006	Grimsby Town	37	(0)
2006–2009	Rochdale	112	(6)
2009–2012	Bradford City	48	(1)
2012–2015	Motherwell	66	(1)
2015–2016	Gateshead	24	(1)
2017–2018	Whitby Town	28	(0)
Total		346	(9)
- * Club domestic league appearances and goals

Simon Paul Ramsden (born 17 December 1981) is an English former professional footballer who played as a defender.

He played for Sunderland, Notts County, Grimsby Town, Rochdale, Bradford City, Motherwell, Gateshead and Whitby Town.

== Career ==
=== Sunderland ===
Born in Bishop Auckland, Ramsden started his career with Newton Aycliffe Youth Centre A.F.C., and was eventually scouted by Sunderland and after graduating from the club's youth academy he was promoted to the first team squad under Peter Reid during the 2001–02 season. He made his professional debut however for Notts County where he would spend the entire 2002–03 season on loan, with his debut coming on 24 August 2002, in the club's 2–0 league defeat against Wigan Athletic. In his absence Sunderland had dismissed Reid and his replacement Howard Wilkinson and were now under the stewardship of Mick McCarthy. On 24 January 2004 Ramsden came on as an 89th-minute substitute for Darren Williams in the club's FA Cup victory over Ipswich Town, this was his first and only first team appearance for Sunderland. Following the conclusion of the 2003–04 season, Ramsden was released by Sunderland.

=== Grimsby Town ===
Ramsden signed with Football League Two side Grimsby Town in July 2004. Initially signed as cover for Tony Crane and Justin Whittle, Ramsden soon became a first team regular in Russell Slade's side due to injuries to Crane and regular right back John McDermott. He made his Town debut on the opening day of the 2004–05 season when the club were defeated by Darlington 1–0. Ramsden soon lost his regular centre half place when Terrell Forbes was signed from Queens Park Rangers. At the end of his first season Ramsden played 26 times in both league and cup for Grimsby. During the 2005–06 season several new signings meant Ramsden very rarely featured and he was left the club in January 2006.

=== Rochdale ===
Ramsden joined Rochdale from Grimsby Town in January 2006. On 1 January 2007, he scored twice for Rochdale on his return to his former club Grimsby in a 4–0 win.

=== Bradford City ===
In June 2009, Ramsden became Bradford City's first signing of the summer. He started off well for the Bantams in his first season making 32 appearances and scoring 2 goals. He was named as the club captain at the start of the 2010–11 campaign, but featured in only 2 league games due to injuries. In the 2011–12 season he regained fitness and took part in a behind closed doors friendly in November against Tranmere Rovers, marking his return to action. Ramsden made his full return to the first team on 8 November 2011 in a Football League Trophy game against League One side Sheffield United. The game went to penalties and Ramsden scored his penalty as Bradford went on to win the shootout. He continued to feature for Bradford making 5 league appearances before breaking his toe in a 3–1 win over Shrewsbury. It was announced that he would be sidelined for 3–6 weeks.

=== Motherwell ===
Ramsden trained with Scottish Premier League team Motherwell on trial after turning down a contract offer from Bradford. He was then awarded a one-year contract by the club after his trial was successful. On 17 May 2013, after a successful first season in Scotland, Ramsden signed a new two-year contract with the club.

On 2 June 2015, Motherwell announced that Ramsden was amongst the players leaving the club, with his contract having expired.

=== Gateshead ===
On 10 July 2015, Ramsden signed for Gateshead, agreeing a one-year contract. He made 25 appearances, scoring 1 goal, before picking up an injury in December. He made no further appearances before being released at the end of the season.

=== Whitby Town ===
On 19 September he came out of retirement to join Whitby Town.

== Personal life ==
Ramsden attended Robertswood County Combined Primary School in Chalfont St Peter, Buckinghamshire. On retirement Ramsden turned his hand to being a car salesman in Sunderland.

After a spell selling cars, he now owns SRFitness in Sunderland and assisting in fitness sessions with Velocity Juniors FC.

Ramsden grew up supporting Sunderland. Ramsden's father works as a social worker, which he considered as his biggest influence on his career.

== Career statistics ==
As of 16 December 2015

Club	Season	League		FA Cup		League Cup		Other		Total	
Club	Season	Apps	Goals	Apps	Goals	Apps	Goals	Apps	Goals	Apps	Goals
Sunderland	2002–03	0	0	0	0	0	0	0	0	0	0
Sunderland	2003–04	0	0	1	0	0	0	0	0	1	0
Sunderland	Total	0	0	1	0	0	0	0	0	1	0
Notts County (loan)	2002–03	32	0	1	0	1	0	0	0	34	0
Grimsby Town	2004–05	25	0	0	0	1	0	0	0	26	0
Grimsby Town	2005–06	12	0	1	0	1	0	1	0	15	0
Grimsby Town	Total	37	0	1	0	2	0	1	0	41	0
Rochdale	2005–06	15	1	0	0	0	0	0	0	15	1
Rochdale	2006–07	34	3	0	0	1	0	1	0	36	3
Rochdale	2007–08	38	2	0	0	2	0	1	0	41	2
Rochdale	2008–09	30	0	1	0	1	0	0	0	32	0
Rochdale	Total	117	6	1	0	4	0	2	0	124	6
Bradford City	2009–10	31	1	0	0	1	0	3	0	35	1
Bradford City	2010–11	2	0	0	0	1	0	0	0	3	0
Bradford City	2011–12	18	0	2	0	0	0	1	0	21	0
Bradford City	Total	51	1	2	0	2	0	4	0	59	1
Motherwell	2012–13	29	0	0	0	0	0	2	0	31	0
Motherwell	2013–14	18	0	0	0	2	0	2	0	22	0
Motherwell	2014–15	22	1	1	0	1	0	4	0	28	1
Motherwell	Total	69	1	1	0	3	0	8	0	81	1
Gateshead	2015–16	24	1	1	0	—		0	0	25	1
Career total		330	9	8	0	12	0	15	0	365	9
