= Thomas Pinault =

French retired professional footballer (born 1981)

Personal information
- Full name: Thomas Pinault
- Date of birth: 4 December 1981 (age 44)
- Place of birth: Grasse, France
- Height: 5 ft 9 in (1.75 m)
- Position: Midfielder

Youth career
- –1998: Cannes

Senior career*
Years	Team	Apps	(Gls)
1998–1999	Cannes	0	(0)
1999–2004	Colchester United	133	(5)
2004–2005	Grimsby Town	43	(7)
2006–2007	Brentford	27	(1)
2007–2010	Crawley Town	109	(8)
2010–2013	RC Grasse		
Total		312	(21)
- * Club domestic league appearances and goals

Thomas Pinault (born 4 December 1981) is a French former professional footballer who played as a midfielder in the Football League for Colchester United, Grimsby Town and Brentford, and his native country for Cannes and RC Grasse.

== Career ==
=== Colchester United ===
A product of the Cannes youth system, Pinault moved to England to join Second Division club Colchester United on a free transfer in June 1999. After making just 10 appearances during his first two full seasons at Layer Road, he broke into the first team squad during the 2001–02 season and signed a new two-and-a-half-year contract in October 2001. Pinault remained with Colchester United until his contract expired at the end of the 2003–04 season, by which time he had made 157 appearances and scored seven goals for the club.

=== Grimsby Town ===
After an unsuccessful trial with Dundee United and turning down a contract from Northampton Town, Pinault signed a one-year contract with League Two club Grimsby Town on a free transfer in July 2004. Pinault was a regular in the team during the 2004–05 season, making 47 appearances and scoring seven goals, but his relationship with manager Russell Slade deteriorated after he was "singled-out for criticism" by Slade for his defensive performance during a 2–2 draw with Notts County late in the season. He was released at the end of the 2004–05 season. In 2006, Pinault's remarks about his time at Blundell Park were chosen as one of BBC Sport's Quotes of the Year:

=== Brentford ===
After a year out of football with an ankle ligament injury, Pinault returned to England sign a one-year contract with League One club Brentford on a free transfer in July 2006. Despite being transfer-listed by incoming manager Scott Fitzgerald in December 2006, Pinault remained at Griffin Park for the duration of the 2006–07 season and made 37 appearances, scoring one goal. He was released in June 2007, after Brentford's relegation to League Two was confirmed.

=== Crawley Town ===
Pinault joined Conference Premier club Crawley Town on a one-year contract in July 2007. Through successive one-year extensions of his contract, he remained at the Broadfield Stadium for three seasons and made 128 appearances for the club. Pinault rejected a new contract and left Crawley at the end of the 2009–10 season.

=== RC Grasse ===
Early in the 2010–11 season, Pinault returned to France to join hometown Championnat de France Amateur 2 club RC Grasse. He remained at the Stade Jean Girard until his retirement at the end of the 2012–13 season.

== Personal life ==
Thomas is the brother of footballer Clément Pinault. After retiring from football, he became an estate agent.

== Career statistics ==
Appearances and goals by club, season and competition
Club	Season	League			National cup (Note: Includes FA Cup, Coupe de France)		League cup (Note: Includes EFL Cup, National League Cup)		Other		Total	
Club	Season	Division	Apps	Goals	Apps	Goals	Apps	Goals	Apps	Goals	Apps	Goals
Colchester United	1999-00	Second Division	4	0	0	0	1	0	0	0	5	0
Colchester United	2000–01	Second Division	5	1	0	0	0	0	0	0	5	1
Colchester United	2001–02	Second Division	42	0	2	0	2	0	2 (Note: Appearances in Football League Trophy)	0	48	0
Colchester United	2002–03	Second Division	42	4	1	0	1	0	1	0	45	4
Colchester United	2003–04	Second Division	40	0	7	0	2	1	5	1	54	2
Colchester United	Total		133	5	10	0	6	1	8	1	157	7
Grimsby Town	2004–05	League Two	43	7	1	0	2	0	1	0	47	7
Brentford	2006–07	League One	27	1	1	0	2	0	1	0	31	1
Crawley Town	2007–08	Conference Premier	41	4	0	0	2	0	6 (Note: 3 appearances in FA Trophy, 3 appearances in Sussex Senior Cup)	0	49	4
Crawley Town	2008–09	Conference Premier	28	3	1	0	2	1	2 (Note: Appearances in FA Trophy)	0	33	4
Crawley Town	2009–10	Conference Premier	40	1	2	0	―		4 (Note: 2 appearances in FA Trophy, 2 appearances in Sussex Senior Cup)	0	46	1
Crawley Town	Total		109	8	3	0	4	1	12	0	128	9
RC Grasse	2012–13	Championnat de France amateur 2	23	2	0	0	―		―		23	2
Career total			335	29	15	0	14	2	22	1	386	32

== Honours ==
Colchester United

- Harwich Charity Cup Centenary Shield: 1999
