= Terry Fleming =

English footballer (born 1973)

Personal information
- Full name: Terence Maurice Fleming
- Date of birth: 5 January 1973 (age 53)
- Place of birth: Marston Green, England
- Position: Midfielder

Youth career
- 1989–1990: Coventry City

Senior career*
Years	Team	Apps	(Gls)
1991–1993	Coventry City	13	(0)
1993–1994	Northampton Town	31	(1)
1994–1995	Preston North End	32	(2)
1995–2000	Lincoln City	183	(8)
2000–2001	Plymouth Argyle	17	(0)
2001–2004	Cambridge United	105	(4)
2004–2005	Grimsby Town	43	(2)
2005–2006	Kidderminster Harriers	38	(2)
2006–2007	Moor Green		
2007	Halesowen Town		
2007–2008	Grantham Town		
2008–2013	Lincoln United		
2013–2015	Sleaford Town		
2015–2016	Boston Town		
2018	Matlock Town		

Managerial career
- 2011–2013: Lincoln United
- * Club domestic league appearances and goals as of 12:54, 30 August 2019 (UTC)

Terence Maurice Fleming (born 5 January 1973) is an English football manager, coach, and former professional footballer.

He played as a midfielder from 1991 to 2016, a career spanning 25 years. During his professional career he notably played for Lincoln City, Cambridge United having started his career at Coventry City, where he played in the very first season of the Premier League. He also had spells with Northampton Town, Preston North End, Plymouth Argyle, Grimsby Town and Kidderminster Harriers before going to play for Non-League side's Moor Green, Halesowen Town and Grantham Town. In 2008, he joined Lincoln United and went on to manage the club from 2011 and 2013. In August 2015 he signed for Boston Town, continuing his playing career beyond his 43rd birthday.

== Playing career ==
Originally Fleming was a trainee with Coventry City before moving on to play for both Northampton Town and Preston North End. Though it was in his spell for Lincoln City that he really took off. Fleming was ever present in the centre of midfield and featured heavily in the club's promotion season in 1997–98.

In the summer of 2000, The Imps lost Fleming to Plymouth Argyle with fellow central midfielder John Finnigan also departing that season. Fleming then spent four impressive seasons with Cambridge United where he was heralded a cult hero by the supporters for his impressive performances. With the club cash strapped though Fleming left United at the end of the 2003–04 season and joined Grimsby Town on a free transfer.

At Grimsby Town, he formed a midfield partnership with fellow veteran Stacy Coldicott as Grimsby struggled and under performed in the 2004–2005 season. His performances were not good enough to earn himself a new deal with Grimsby, and both himself and Coldicott were released at the end of the season.

His next port of call was to sign for Kidderminster Harriers who had just been relegated out of the football league, after an average season, Fleming was released again and moved onto play for Moor Green (now known as Solihull Moors). Halesowen Town signed Fleming in 2007, along with two other former English Football League players in the form of Stephen Cooke (who also played in the Premier League for Aston Villa) and Duane Darby. After he was released by the Yeltz, Fleming had a spell at Grantham Town.

Terry was named as Grantham Town's captain for the 2008–09 season, impressing Gingerbreads manager John Wilkinson with his professionalism and experience. However, following Wilkinson's departure from the club Fleming moved on to join Lincoln United. Fleming made his debut for the club in the abandoned game with Sheffield on 29 November 2008 with his official debut following in the 3–2 home victory over Stocksbridge Park Steels on 2 December 2008.

== Coaching career ==
In 2011, he was appointed manager of Lincoln United as well as continuing with his playing career. On 10 April 2013 Fleming was dismissed as United's manager. He joined Sleaford Town in a playing capacity, debuting in the club's 1-1 United Counties League draw at Yaxley on 27 April 2013.

In June 2013 he was appointed player/assistant manager to Kris Jones at Sleaford Town with his one-time Lincoln City teammate Gavin Gordon as first team coach. In August 2014, he was appointed Interim Manager of the club following the injuries sustained by the club's manager Kris Jones in a car crash. He departed the club following a 0–0 draw at Deeping Rangers on 10 March 2015, a game which saw him sent-off for dissent. However, the red card had no bearing on the club's Board's decision to remove him from his role as Interim Manager, with Chairman Brian Rowland stating that it was a footballing decision based upon Sleaford's urgent need to acquire points in a battle against relegation.

In February 2016 he took over as assistant manager at Boston Town, having signed for the club as a player in August 2015. In October 2016 he joined the coaching staff at Northern Premier League side Spalding United.

On 13 February 2017 Fleming and manager Dave Frecklington left Spalding United to join National League North side Gainsborough Trinity. Flemimg was relieved of his duties when Frecklington lost his job on 7 February 2018. In late 2018 while an assistant coach at Matlock Town, Fleming came out of playing retirement to play against Basford United.

== Personal life ==
Born in England, Fleming is of Jamaican descent. He is the step-father of Jerell Sellars and father of Tyrell Sellars-Fleming, both professional footballers.

== Honours ==
Cambridge United

- Football League Trophy runner-up: 2001–02
