= Chris Bolder =

English footballer

Personal information
- Full name: Christopher James Bolder
- Date of birth: 19 August 1982 (age 44)
- Place of birth: Hull, England
- Height: 5 ft 11 in (1.80 m)
- Position: Midfielder

Team information
- Current team: North Ferriby (Manager)

Youth career
- 2000–2001: Hull City

Senior career*
| Years | Team | Apps | (Gls) |
| 2001–2004 | Grimsby Town | 19 | (0) |
| 2004–2005 | Ossett Town | | |
| 2005–2008 | North Ferriby United | | |
| 2008–2009 | Guiseley | | |
| 2009–2013 | North Ferriby United | | |
| 2013–2017 | Scarborough Athletic | | |

Managerial career
- 2016–2017: Scarborough Athletic (player-assistant)
- 2017: Scarborough Athletic (assistant)
- 2017–2018: North Ferriby United
- 2019: Scarborough Athletic (assistant)
- 2019: Matlock Town (assistant)
- 2019–: North Ferriby
- * Club domestic league appearances and goals

Christopher James Bolder (born 19 August 1982) is an English football manager and former footballer who is manager of Northern Counties East League side North Ferriby.

Bolder was a midfielder in career that lasted from 2001 until 2017, although he only played professionally in the Football League for Grimsby Town between 2001 and 2004, having initially come through the youth ranks at Hull City. Following his release from Grimsby, Bolder moved into Non-League football and turned out for Ossett Town and Guiseley as well as notably spending seven seasons over two spells with North Ferriby United. He later played for Scarborough Athletic where in his final two seasons he also acted as assistant manager. He returned to North Ferriby as manager but after the club was liquidated he took over as manager of the Ferriby's phoenix club in 2019.

== Playing career ==
=== Grimsby Town ===
Bolder and brother Adam were part of the junior setup at Hull City, and both left the club at a young age to pursue career's in the higher divisions. Chris left Hull in the summer of 2001, to sign a professional contract with Grimsby Town, who at the time were several divisions higher than Hull. He made the move to Blundell Park with fellow City youngster Graham Hockless, and the pair slotted into the club's reserve squad. Bolder failed to make an appearance in his first season with The Mariners, and did not make his debut until nearly 18 months later playing against his brothers team Derby County in a 3–1 victory on Boxing Day 2002. He went on to make a handful of appearances that season but was unable to help Grimsby in there relegation battle, and they dropped down into the Second Division. He was to make only seven showings the following season and was released in May 2004 following another relegation.

=== Non-league ===
Bolder first joined Ossett Town following his release from The Mariners. He went on to spend seven seasons in total with North Ferriby United over two spells which were separated with a season at Guiseley in 2008. He later joined Scarborough Athletic.

== Personal life ==
Bolder is the younger brother of fellow footballer Adam Bolder.

== Coaching career ==
In December 2015, Bolder was appointed assistant manager of Scarborough Athletic under Steve Kittrick, still registered as a player. In April 2017, he retired as player after collapsing during a game due to breathing difficulties. He continued at the club in his role as assistant manager. On 28 November 2017, Bolder left his position as assistant manager of Scarborough Athletic to become manager of North Ferriby United. He was sacked in October 2018 after a period with bad results.

In January 2019, he returned to Scarborough Athletic as assistant manager, once again under Steve Kittrick. The duo was sacked for the second time on 16 March 2019. On 6 May 2019, he was appointed assistant manager of Matlock Town under Kittrick again, but Bolder left after only one week to return to North Ferriby as their new manager for the 2019/20 season.
