= Stephen Downes (footballer) =

English footballer

Personal information
- Date of birth: 12 November 1981 (age 44)
- Place of birth: Leeds, West Yorkshire, England
- Positions: Defender; midfielder

Senior career*
Years	Team	Apps	(Gls)
2001–2002	Ossett Albion		
2002–2003	Grimsby Town	0	(0)
2003–2004	York City	6	(0)
2007	Bradford Park Avenue	5	(0)
2007–2009	Farsley Celtic	23	(3)
2009–2011	Bradford Park Avenue	29	(2)
2011–2012	Green Gully Cavaliers	40	(2)
Total		103	(7)
- * Club domestic league appearances and goals as of 21 September 2014

Stephen Downes (born 12 November 1981) is an English former professional footballer, who played as a midfielder.

He notably played in The Football League for York City during the 2003–04 season, and beforehand had been contracted to Grimsby Town whilst they played in the second tier of English football but he was released before he made an appearance. He has also appeared at Non-league level for Ossett Albion, Bradford Park Avenue and Farsley Celtic.

== Career ==
Downes started his football career in Non-League Ossett Albion, before being scouted by Grimsby Town in 2002 who at the time were playing in the second tier of English football. Downes was one of many summer signings brought to Blundell Park in the summer of 2002 by manager Paul Groves. With Grimsby boasting a thick squad in all positions, Downes failed to make an impact and was only named as a substitute on several occasions without making an appearance.

He was released from his contract at the end of the 2002–2003 season and subsequently joined Third Division side York City. Downes only made 6 league appearances for York before he was again released by his new club at the end of the season.

Now a pipe fitter by trade, Downes went on to play for Farsley Celtic where he became the clubs favoured penalty taker in which he scored against Aldershot and Ebbsfleet in the 2007–08 Conference National season. In 2009, he re-signed for Bradford Park Avenue.

In 2011, Downes emigrated to Australia, where he went on to sign for the Green Gully Cavaliers.
