= Terrell Forbes =

English footballer

Personal information
- Full name: Terrell Dishan Forbes
- Date of birth: 17 August 1981 (age 45)
- Place of birth: Southwark, England
- Height: 6 ft 0 in (1.83 m)
- Position: Defender

Youth career
- ?–1999: West Ham United

Senior career*
Years	Team	Apps	(Gls)
1999–2001	West Ham United	0	(0)
1999	→ Bournemouth (loan)	3	(0)
2001–2004	Queens Park Rangers	114	(0)
2004–2005	Grimsby Town	33	(0)
2005–2006	Oldham Athletic	39	(0)
2006–2010	Yeovil Town	163	(1)
2010–2012	Leyton Orient	73	(2)
2012–2013	Chesterfield	17	(1)
2013	Aldershot Town	10	(0)
2013–2014	Dover Athletic	39	(0)
2014–2015	Dulwich Hamlet	39	(3)
2015–2016	Hemel Hempstead Town	19	(0)
2016	Farnborough	14	(0)
2016–2017	Grays Athletic	11	(0)
2017–2018	Whyteleafe	24	(0)
Total		598	(7)
- * Club domestic league appearances and goals as of 21:50, 15 December 2016 (UTC)

Terrell Dishan Forbes (born 17 August 1981) is an English former professional footballer who played as a defender.

He was active between 1999 and 2018 and was a member of the West Ham United 1999 FA Youth Cup winning team and gained promotion from Division Two with Queens Park Rangers in 2004. He has also played professionally for Bournemouth, Grimsby Town, Oldham Athletic, Yeovil Town, Leyton Orient, Chesterfield and Aldershot Town. In 2013 he moved into Non-League football and featured for Dover Athletic, Dulwich Hamlet, Hemel Hempstead Town, Farnborough, Grays Athletic and Whyteleafe.

== Club career ==
Forbes was born in Southwark, London in 1981 and began his career as a youth player at West Ham United, featuring in their 1999 FA Youth Cup win. However, he was unable to break into West Ham's first team, and after a loan spell with Bournemouth in 1999 where he made four league and cup appearances, he joined Queens Park Rangers on a free transfer in July 2001. He quickly established himself in the first team, making 45 league and cup appearances in the 2001–02 season, 43 appearances in the 2002–03 season and 38 appearances in the 2003–04 season, helping QPR to the Division Two play-off final in May 2003, which they lost 1–0 to Cardiff City after extra time, and to automatic promotion in May 2004 as runners-up in promotion from Division Two . However, he was out of contract at the end of the 2003–04 season and was released by the club.

Forbes joined Grimsby Town on a short-term contract in September 2004, which was later extended to the end of the season. He made 34 league and cup appearances in the 2004–05 season for Grimsby but opted to leave Grimsby to play in a division higher with Oldham Athletic, signing a two-year contract with Oldham in May 2005. He made 44 league and cup appearances for Oldham in the 2005–06 season before joining Yeovil Town in June 2006, on a two-year contract He made 52 appearances for Yeovil in the 2006–07 season, as Yeovil reached the League One play-off final in May 2007, losing 2–0 to Blackpool. Forbes scored the first goal of his career in a 2–1 away win against Bristol Rovers on 24 October 2009.

He signed for Russell Slade for a third time on 26 May 2010 when he joined Leyton Orient, rejecting an offer of a new contract at Yeovil. In May 2012, Forbes was released by the club after the expiry of his contract.

On 13 June 2012 he signed with Chesterfield on a one-year deal. His first goal for Chesterfield was the winner in a dramatic 4–3 win over Accrington Stanley. His second goal for the club came in a 6–1 win over Hartlepool United in the FA Cup. On 22 January 2013, after playing 21 times (17 in the league) and scoring two goals Forbes was released by Chesterfield. The following day he signed for Aldershot Town. In May 2013 Aldershot suffered relegation from the Football League and over the summer the entire playing squad were released following the club's entry into administration.

On 17 July 2013, Forbes moved into non-League football for the first time in his career by signing for Conference South club Dover Athletic.

After one season with Dover Athletic, in which he made 39 league appearances as the club won promotion to the Conference Premier via the play-offs, in June 2014 Forbes signed for Dulwich Hamlet of the Isthmian League Premier Division, starting the season as the club's new on-field captain.

Following one season with Dulwich Hamlet, in which he made 39 league appearances and scored three goals as the Isthmian League Premier Division side missed out on promotion to the Conference South in the playoffs, Forbes moved on to Hemel Hempstead Town in June 2015.

Forbes moved onto Farnborough alongside Dennis Oli on 4 March 2016, before joining Grays Athletic the following season on 19 October.

== Honours ==
West Ham United

- FA Youth Cup champion: 1998–99

Queens Park Rangers

- Second Division runners-up: 2003–04

Yeovil Town

- League One play-off final runner-up: 2006–07
