= Andy Pettinger =

English professional footballer (born 1984)

Personal information
- Full name: Andrew Pettinger
- Date of birth: 21 April 1984 (age 42)
- Place of birth: Scunthorpe, England
- Position: Goalkeeper

Team information
- Current team: Cleethorpes Town (Player/Goalkeeping coach)

Youth career
- 1996–1999: Scunthorpe United

Senior career*
Years	Team	Apps	(Gls)
1999–2000	Scunthorpe United	0	(0)
2000–2002	Everton	0	(0)
2002–2004	Grimsby Town	3	(0)
2004–2005	Ossett Town		
2005–2009	Armthorpe Welfare		
2009–2011	Brigg Town		
2011–2012	Gainsborough Trinity		
2013–2015	Brigg Town		
2021–	Cleethorpes Town		
- * Club domestic league appearances and goals as of 21:40, 5 June 2008 (UTC)

Andrew Pettinger (born 21 April 1984) is an English former professional footballer and goalkeeping coach at Cleethorpes Town, where he is also registered as a player.

He was the product of the Scunthorpe United youth system, before moving to Premier League side Everton. During his time at the Toffees he played in the 2002 FA Youth Cup final. His only appearances as a professional in the Football League came for Grimsby Town. He also played for Ossett Town, Armthorpe Welfare, Brigg Town and Gainsborough Trinity.

== Playing career ==
=== Scunthorpe United ===
At the young age of 16, Andy Pettinger was promoted to the first team setup at Scunthorpe United, albeit at the time, as the club's 4th choice goalkeeper, in a keeper line-up that consisted of Tommy Evans, Ross Turner and Leigh Herrick.

=== Everton ===
In April 2000 Premier League club Everton came in for Pettinger's services. And the young keeper signed a two-year professional contract with the Merseyside side. In his first season with the club, Pettinger was the 4th choice shot stopper behind the likes of Thomas Myhre, Paul Gerrard and Steve Simonsen.

In his latter season with The Toffees he also was understudy to England international Richard Wright. Pettinger appeared as an unused substitute in a 1–0 away Premiership victory over Southampton on 20 April 2002. Along with a young Wayne Rooney, Pettinger featured in Everton's eight-game run to the 2002 FA Youth Cup.

=== Grimsby Town ===
In September 2002 Pettinger was released by Everton, and returned home to his native Lincolnshire signing a one-year contract with Grimsby Town. Pettinger would become the second choice goalkeeper during the 2003–2004 season and deputised three times for Aidan Davison throughout the season. Davison was eventually ruled out of the last three months of the season, but the club instead chose to loan in Alan Fettis from Hull City limiting Pettinger's first team opportunities, his debut for Grimsby came in a 6–1 victory over Barnsley. Following Grimsby's relegation from the Second Division, Pettinger was amongst those players released.

=== Non-League ===
Following his release, Pettinger joined Ossett Town and for the 2005–2006 season, he moved even further down the non-league game by signing for South Yorkshire side Armthorpe Welfare. In 2006, Armthorpe granted permission for Pettinger to join Football League One side Oldham Athletic on trial, but following a week training with the club he failed to earn a contract. Pettinger left Armthorpe eventually at the end of the 2008–2009 season.

Pettinger made a third return to Lincolnshire this time signing with Brigg Town at the start of the 2009–2010 season.

In May 2011 he joined Brian Little's Conference North side Gainsborough Trinity bringing him to the club as understudy to Phil Barnes several weeks after his former Brigg manager Steve Housham had been appointed as Trinity's new youth team manager. Pettinger served as the second choice keeper under Barnes during the 2011–12 season, and briefly replaced him until himself was sidelined with an injury that ruled him out for the remainder of the season. At the end of the 2011–12 season he left Trinity to concentrate on his part-time coaching work with Scunthorpe United youth academy. After one year out of the game, Pettinger returned to playing by signing for Brigg at the start of the 2013–14 season where he remained until the summer of 2015.

== Coaching career ==
Having previously coached at youth level for Scunthorpe, Pettinger joined Cleethorpes Town as goalkeeping coach in July 2021. He also was registered as a back-up player.

He made his debut for Town in a 4-2 friendly defeat against Scarborough Athletic.

== Honours ==
- 2002 FA Youth Cup: Runner-up
