= David Soames =

English footballer (born 1984)

Personal information
- Full name: David Michael Soames
- Date of birth: 10 December 1984 (age 41)
- Place of birth: Grimsby, England
- Height: 5 ft 08 in (1.73 m)
- Position: Forward

Youth career
- 2000–2002: Grimsby Town

Senior career*
Years	Team	Apps	(Gls)
2002–2005	Grimsby Town	24	(1)
2005–2006	Armthorpe Welfare	33	(16)
Total		57	(17)
- * Club domestic league appearances and goals

David Michael Soames (born 10 December 1984) is an English former professional footballer who played as a forward from 2002 to 2006.

He played in the Football League for Grimsby Town from 2002 until 2005, but retired a year later aged just 21, due to a persistent injury problem that hampered most of his playing career. He now works for North East Lincolnshire Council as a community sports coach.

== Football career ==
=== Grimsby Town ===
Soames, nicknamed "Digger", was part of a decent youth team strike force that also boasted Darren Mansaram. He signed professional terms with Grimsby Town in October 2002 following an injury crisis at the club. He made his debut on 23 November when he was drafted into the squad to face Crystal Palace and played in the club's defeat at Selhurst Park. On Boxing Day 2002, he came off the bench to score his first senior goal in a 3–1 away win over Derby County; this would be his only senior goal in professional football. He continued to feature in the first team, but without scoring. In a game against Stoke City he was fouled by defender Sergei Shtanyuk, who was dismissed for his challenge after hacking down Soames, who was clear on goal. Grimsby were unable to avoid relegation from the First Division and rumours circulated that linked Soames with Port Vale and Lincoln City, but nothing ever came of either.

After suffering an injury early on in the 2003–04 season, Soames found it tough to break back into the first team with a number of other attacking options available to his manager. His first-team appearances throughout the season were limited and more injury trouble meant he didn't make another appearance until March 2005, in a 2–0 defeat against Rochdale. At the end of the season manager Russell Slade did not offer him a contract extension, but invited him back for training for the new season with the possibility of earning a new deal. However, after still struggling with injury, he decided against the idea and left the club.

=== Armthorpe Welfare ===
Upon leaving Grimsby, Soames took a few months out of the game before reappearing on trial with York City along with former teammate Giovanni Carcehdi. After failing to earn himself a deal with York, Soames moved into non-league football by joining South Yorkshire side Armthorpe Welfare just before the start of the 2005–06 season. The move had seen him drop from the fourth tier of English football to the ninth, with Armthorpe playing in the Northern Counties East League Premier Division.

Come the end of the season, Soames had finished as Armthorpe's top scorer and had a brief but fruitful partnership with former Grimsby teammate Clint Marcelle. Soames left Armthorpe at the end of the 2005–06 season, and opted to retire from playing the game, aged only 21.

== Personal life ==
Soames is currently engaged to his long-term partner Polly who owns a salon in Cleethorpes named Twelve. Following his retirement from his professional football career, Soames went on to work as a fitness instructor and coach for SportsLincs, who, in a partnership with North East Lincolnshire Council and Humberside Police, created football coaching classes to help keep children off the streets of Grimsby and Cleethorpes. Soames also played amateur Sunday league football in the Grimsby area.

In July 2012, Soames was part of the North East Lincolnshire Council 5-aside football team that won the national championships, playing against teams from all over the country.

In 2012, Soames was still working for North East Lincolnshire Council, working for sporting needs for people over the age of 45.

== Career statistics ==
Club performance
Club	Season	League	Level	League		FA Cup		League Cup		FL Trophy		Total
Club	Season	League	Level	Apps	Goals	Apps	Goals	Apps	Goals	Apps	Goals	Apps	Goals
Grimsby Town	2002–03	First Division	2	10	1	2	0	0	0	0	0	12	1
Grimsby Town	2003–04	Second Division	3	10	0	0	0	0	0	0	0	10	0
Grimsby Town	2004–05	League Two	4	4	0	0	0	0	0	0	0	4	0
Armthorpe Welfare	2005–06	NCEL Premier Division	9	33	16	0	0	0	0	0	0	33	16
