= Steve Kabba =

English footballer and agent

Personal information
- Full name: Sorfiyu Tejan Kabba
- Date of birth: 7 March 1981 (age 45)
- Place of birth: Lambeth, London, England
- Height: 5 ft 10 in (1.78 m)
- Position: Striker

Youth career
- –1999: Crystal Palace

Senior career*
Years	Team	Apps	(Gls)
1999–2002	Crystal Palace	10	(1)
2000	→ Southend United (loan)	0	(0)
2002	→ Luton Town (loan)	3	(0)
2002	→ Grimsby Town (loan)	13	(6)
2002–2007	Sheffield United	78	(18)
2007–2009	Watford	25	(1)
2008	→ Blackpool (loan)	17	(2)
2009	→ Oldham Athletic (loan)	8	(0)
2009–2010	Brentford	10	(0)
2009–2010	→ Burton Albion (loan)	23	(6)
2010–2013	Barnet	32	(12)
Total		219	(46)
Medal record
Sheffield United
Runner-up	Football League Championship	2006
- * Club domestic league appearances and goals

Sorfiyu Tejan "Steve" Kabba (born 7 March 1981) is an English former professional footballer turned football agent. He played as a forward from 1999 to 2013.

Kabba began his career with Crystal Palace in 1999 but failed to make an impact at Selhurst Park and following loan spells with Southend United and Luton Town he joined Grimsby Town initially on a one-month loan in August 2002. His performances for Grimsby earned him a permanent switch to Sheffield United. He went on to earn promotion with United and would feature for the club in the Premier League whilst also being a key part of the Blades squad in several successful campaigns. He eventually moved on to Watford before a series of injury woes began to damage his career and after several short loans with Blackpool and Oldham Athletic he moved on to Brentford and Burton Albion before spending his final two seasons with Barnet. He announced his retirement at the end of the 2012–13 season at the age of 32.

== Club career ==
=== Crystal Palace ===
Born in Lambeth, London, Kabba started his career at Crystal Palace and was promoted to the first team at the start of the 1999–2000 season under the management of Steve Coppell. He made his first professional appearance for Palace on 4 December 1999 in the club's 2–0 league defeat against Crewe Alexandra. Kabba started the game and was substituted in the 39th minute with Richard Harris replacing him.

After struggling to break into the first team, Kabba was loaned out to Southend United for one month in October 2000. However, he did not play a game for United. Upon his return to Palace he made his first appearance for them in just under a year when he played against Tranmere Rovers in November 2000. Despite holding down a good scoring record for the reserve side, Kabba failed to make an impact on the first team and in March 2002 he was loaned out again, this time to Luton Town. He made three substitute appearance for the Hatters before returning to Selhurst Park. He scored his first and only goal for Palace in a 2–1 win over Preston in August 2002.

==== Loan to Grimsby Town ====
At the start of the 2002–03 season, Kabba was made available for loan again, and in August 2002 he joined fellow First Division club, Grimsby Town on an initial one-month loan. He made his Grimsby debut against Bradford City. He scored six goals in fourteen games for the Mariners. Grimsby manager Paul Groves put forward his plans to land the striker on a permanent deal. However, his performances had caught the eye of rivals Sheffield United who made an official approach to sign Kabba. In turn the Grimsby Telegraph ran a campaign which they named "Stay Steve" in which supporters were given paper pull outs to hold up on Kabba's final game for the club.

=== Sheffield United ===
Grimsby could not compete with United's bid and this eventually saw Kabba join Sheffield United in November 2002 for a fee of £250,000. In his first season his eleven goals in 33 games helped the team reach two domestic cup semi-finals and the First Division play-off final. Scoring a goal for United against rivals Leeds United. His good rapport with Grimsby fans was shattered when he goaded them seconds after scoring for United in their 4–1 victory at Blundell Park, this despite having received a warm reception by the home supporters. Kabba continued his good form under Neil Warnock and after this successful first season his career was interrupted by a sequence of leg injuries allowing him just one appearance as a substitute in over a year. He returned to fitness at the end of 2004–05 Championship season.

Ultimately Kabba would appear less than 100 times in his five years at the club. During a clear out at Bramall Lane he was transfer listed on 22 December 2006 along with seven other players. He made only a handful of Premier League appearances for the Blades and his last appearance was as a substitute against West Ham United in November 2006.

=== Watford ===
Kabba's next move was to move back down south to sign for Watford, who like Sheffield United were struggling as Premier League newcomers. He signed for an initial fee of £500,000 (which rose to £750,000) on 26 January 2007, signing a two-and-a-half-year contract. On 31 January 2007, he played his first Premier League match for Watford against Manchester United. On 2 February 2008, he scored his first goal in nearly two years in a 3–0 league win over Wolverhampton Wanderers. On 11 July 2008, Kabba joined fellow Championship club Blackpool on loan until 1 January 2009. After suffering an injury he finally made his debut for the club as a 90th-minute substitute on 16 August in a 1–1 draw away at Norwich City. At the end of his loan spell, on 31 December 2008 he returned to Watford.

On 26 February 2009, Kabba joined League One side Oldham Athletic on loan until the end of the season. Two days later, he made his debut for the Latics in a 3–2 victory over Millwall. He was released by Watford at the end of the 2008/09 season.

=== Brentford ===
On 6 August 2009, Kabba signed for Brentford on a free transfer, after being released by Watford.

In November 2009, Kabba signed for Burton Albion on loan, making his Brewers debut on 28 November away to Gillingham in the FA Cup. Kabba's loan was extended to the end of the season after scoring three goals in four League games in his initial spell.

He was released by Brentford on 11 May 2010 along with three other players.

=== Barnet ===
After a successful trial Kabba signed for Barnet in July 2010. He made his debut for the Bees on the opening day of the 2010–11 season at Chesterfield where he had to be stretchered off with five minutes to go after a foul by Craig Davies, who was sent off for the challenge. Kabba scored his first goal for the club in the 2–2 draw away to Morecambe on 25 September 2010, and scored again four days later in a 4–2 defeat at Wycombe Wanderers. On 2 April 2011, Kabba scored all four goals in a 4–1 away victory against Burton Albion.

Kabba made only 12 appearances in all competitions in the 2011–12 season after suffering a knee injury in November, which kept him out for the remainder of 2011–12 and for the entirety of 2012–13. He was released by Barnet on 24 April 2013, having played his last game for the club 17 months earlier in November 2011. The club announced that he was finally nearing full fitness at the time of his release, and was being released to have a full pre-season with another club.

Following a recurring injury which required five operations in two years, Kabba was advised to retire and announced his decision on Twitter on 29 November 2013.

== International career ==
Kabba was born in England and is of Sierra Leonean descent, and declined a callup to the Sierra Leone national team.

== Later life ==
Kabba now works as an agent and a personal trainer.
