= Ashley Sestanovich =

English footballer (born 1981)

Personal information
- Full name: Ashley Shane Sestanovich
- Date of birth: 18 September 1981 (age 45)
- Place of birth: Lambeth, England
- Height: 6 ft 3 in (1.91 m)
- Position: Midfielder

Youth career
- 1998–1999: Millwall
- 1999–2000: Manchester City

Senior career*
Years	Team	Apps	(Gls)
2000–2001	Royal Antwerp	0	(0)
2001–2002	Mullingar Town		
2002–2003	Hampton & Richmond Borough	16	(4)
2003–2005	Sheffield United	2	(0)
2003–2004	→ Scarborough (loan)	7	(2)
2004–2005	→ Grimsby Town (loan)	22	(2)
2005	Chester City	7	(0)
2005–2006	Farnborough Town	28	(7)
2006	Grays Athletic	0	(0)
Total		82+	(15+)
- * Club domestic league appearances and goals

Ashley Shane Sestanovich (born 18 September 1981) is an English former professional footballer who played as a midfielder from 2000 to 2006. He played in the Football League for Sheffield United, Grimsby Town and Chester City.

== Career ==
=== Early career ===
Sestanovich began his career as a junior playing in Millwall's youth team setup. He moved to Manchester City in 1999, but failed to break into the first team and was released after a year with the club. He eventually earned a professional contract in Belgium when he signed with Royal Antwerp, however he failed to make a single appearance and was released after less than a year.

He headed south and joined French side Metz on a trial period but failed to earn a contract. After this, the Republic of Ireland called and Sestanovich found himself as part of a bizarre attempt to get League of Ireland status for Mullingar Town, a small team who operated from the County Westmeath capital town Mullingar, but the club failed to break into Ireland's top division and Sestanovich departed for England.

=== Sheffield United ===
Sestanovich dipped his toes in non-League football, when he signed for Isthmian League club Hampton & Richmond in the summer of 2002. After scoring 4 goals in 16 matches for Hampton, he was scouted by both Stockport County and Sheffield United, with the former Premier League side United eventually snapping Sestanovich up for a small fee. Blades boss Neil Warnock considered that it was in his and their best interests to loan him out to other clubs to gain some first team experience, and so during the 2003–04 season he signed for Conference National side Scarborough. His time with the club was relatively successful, helping them reach the fourth round of the FA Cup, where they narrowly lost 1–0 at home to Premier League side Chelsea 1–0 in a televised game.

In the previous round, Sestanovich had scored the winner to dump Port Vale out of the competition. Whilst with the Seadogs, he managed to score three goals in twelve games. Sestanovich was voted Player of the Round for his display against Port Vale (where he scored the winner for Scarborough) in the second round proper of the FA Cup. As a result, he was included in the first ever Team of the FA Cup for the 2003–04 season with, amongst others, Lee Trundle.

=== Grimsby Town ===
Sestanovich returned to Sheffield United and playing in two games in April 2004, before being made available for loan again in the 2004–05 season. Rumours circulated that Sestanovich was about to sign with Grimsby Town following the appointment of former Scarborough manager Russell Slade as the new boss of Grimsby. One week later, Slade brought in Sestanovich on a season-long loan deal. Although initially becoming popular amongst supporters, Sestanovich left Grimsby abruptly following numerous on and off the field incidents in which he refused to be a substitute in a match against Swansea City, which led to him leaving the stadium without permission, receiving a four match ban for verbally abusing a referee, several driving offences and getting sent off four minutes after coming on as a substitute in a match with Northampton Town. He had his loan terminated five months early and was transfer listed by parent club Sheffield United, who went on to release him from his contract the following week. Several days later, he joined Gillingham on trial but failed to earn a contract, joining Chester City instead on a short-term deal. He made his debut against Grimsby, but only went on to make six more appearances before being released.

=== Later career ===
Following a failed trial in Scotland with Dundee and one with Gravesend & Nortfleet, Sestanovich signed for Farnborough Town, before he signed with Grays Athletic in June 2006.

== Personal life ==
Sestanovich was born in Lambeth, London, of Croatian and Grenadian descent.

Sestanovich stood in for Thierry Henry during filming for a Nike advert in Rome. The boyhood Arsenal fan told the BBC at the time, "I met Thierry Henry when I was filming an advert for a Nike commercial in Rome and I played the part of his body double. I met all the players – the likes of Ronaldo, Ronaldinho and Luis Enrique were all there. Sylvain Wiltord, Patrick Vieira and Thierry Henry were there from Arsenal and it was great to see them face-to-face – but I would like to meet them on the pitch at some point." Sestanovich also acted as Henry's body double for a series of TV adverts for Renault cars.

In 2006, Sestanovich was arrested and charged with conspiracy to rob from a roofing firm in South London in June 2005 that resulted in the murder of a man who was shot in the chest during the raid. In April 2007, he was found guilty and sentenced to eight years in prison which subsequently ended his professional football career after Grays terminated his contract. Grays were ordered by The FA to pay Sestanovich five months' worth of outstanding wages while he was on remand.
