= Chris Williams (English footballer) =

English footballer and coach (born 1985)

Personal information
- Full name: Christopher Jonathan Williams
- Date of birth: 2 February 1985 (age 41)
- Place of birth: Manchester, England
- Height: 5 ft 8 in (1.73 m)
- Positions: Forward; winger

Youth career
- 2000–2001: Stockport County

Senior career*
Years	Team	Apps	(Gls)
2001–2006	Stockport County	34	(3)
2004	→ Grimsby Town (loan)	3	(0)
2005–2006	→ Leigh RMI (loan)	6	(0)
2006	→ Northwich Victoria (loan)		
2006–2007	Northwich Victoria	19	(2)
2007–2008	Bradford Park Avenue		
2008–2009	Stalybridge Celtic	15	(4)
2009	Fleetwood Town		
2009–2011	Rhyl	10	(2)
2011–2012	The New Saints	8	(0)
2012–2013	Rhyl		
2013–2014	Stockport Sports		
2014–2015	Salford City		
- * Club domestic league appearances and goals as of 06:00, 29 February 2012 (UTC)

Christopher Jonathan Williams (born 2 February 1985) is an English former professional footballer and coach.

The Manchester-born player notably appeared in the Football League for both Stockport County and Grimsby Town, before going on to play non-League football for Leigh RMI, Northwich Victoria, Bradford Park Avenue, Stalybridge Celtic and Fleetwood Town. He also had spells in the Welsh Premier League for both Rhyl and The New Saints.

== Playing career ==
=== Stockport County ===
A pacey winger who can play on either flank, Williams started his career in Stockport County's youth system as a 12-year-old. He turned professional in October 2001, and made his first-team debut aged 16 years 256 days, as a late substitute in the 1–1 draw with Watford in Division One, on 10 November the same year. He spent several short spells out on loan, at Grimsby Town in 2004, Leigh RMI in 2005, and Northwich Victoria in 2006, and was released by Stockport in March 2006.

=== Move into non-League ===
After his release from County, Williams signed a permanent deal with Northwich, initially until the end of the 2005–06 season, but in August 2006 he suffered a compound fracture of the right leg which kept him on the sidelines until April 2007. Williams failed to make an impact on the first team, fell out with the manager, and in January 2008 he was released, moving on to Bradford Park Avenue where he spent the rest of the 2007–08 season before joining Stalybridge Celtic in the summer. In February 2009, he was transferred to Fleetwood Town.

=== Rhyl and The New Saints ===
In September 2009 he moved on to Welsh Premier League club Rhyl where he spent two seasons. On 27 May 2011 he joined The New Saints. His competitive debut for the club took place on 30 June 2011 against Cliftonville in a Europa League first qualifying round match.

In July 2012 he rejoined Rhyl.

=== Return to England ===
Williams returned to the English non-League by joining Stockport Sports during the 2013–14 season, before moving to Salford City in March 2014.

== Coaching career ==
Based in Manchester, Williams now owns and coaches for the "Chris Williams Football Academy".
