= Nicky Law (footballer, born 1961) =

English footballer (born 1961)

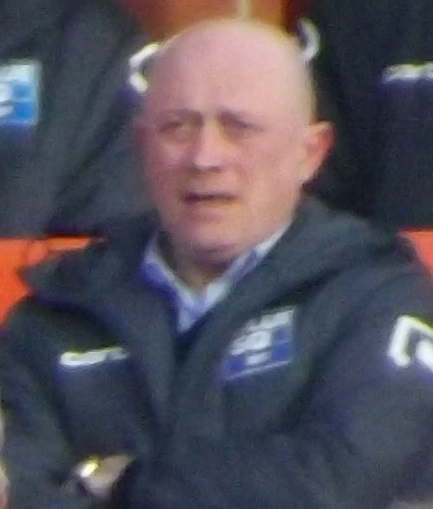
- Law in 2013

Personal information
- Full name: Nicholas Law
- Date of birth: 8 September 1961 (age 65)
- Place of birth: Greenwich, England
- Height: 6 ft 0 in (1.83 m)
- Position: Defender

Youth career
- 1979–1981: Arsenal

Senior career*
Years	Team	Apps	(Gls)
1981–1985	Barnsley	114	(1)
1985–1987	Blackpool	66	(1)
1987–1988	Plymouth Argyle	38	(5)
1988–1990	Notts County	47	(4)
1989	→ Scarborough (loan)	12	(0)
1990–1993	Rotherham United	128	(4)
1993–1996	Chesterfield	111	(11)
1996–1997	Hereford United	14	(0)
Total		530	(26)

International career
1977	England Schoolboys	8	(0)

Managerial career
- 2000–2001: Chesterfield
- 2002–2003: Bradford City
- 2004: Grimsby Town
- 2004–2007: Buxton
- 2007–2017: Alfreton Town
- 2024: Matlock Town
- * Club domestic league appearances and goals

Nicholas Law (born 8 September 1961) is an English former professional footballer and football manager.

He previously played as a defender for clubs including Barnsley, Rotherham United and Chesterfield. He became manager of the latter between 2000 and 2001 and later went on to take charge at Bradford City, Grimsby Town, Buxton, Alfreton Town and Matlock Town.

== Playing career ==
Law played as a defender between 1981 and 1997 for Barnsley, Blackpool, Plymouth Argyle, Notts County, Scarborough, Rotherham United, Chesterfield and Hereford United. He began his professional career at Arsenal, but his first team involvement was limited to a single appearance on the substitute's bench in a 1–5 defeat at Aston Villa on 24 April 1979.

== Managerial and coaching career ==
=== Chesterfield ===
Law was made Football in the Community officer with Chesterfield before taking over as manager from John Duncan in the spring of 2000. The change was too late to save the Spireites from relegation in 1999–2000, but with some shrewd signings by Law, the team dominated Division Three in 2000–01 and led the table, until the pressures of the Football League enquiry into financial irregularities started to impact on performances. Despite a nine-point deduction, Law nevertheless led Chesterfield to third place and automatic promotion to Division Two.

=== Bradford City ===
On 1 January 2002, Law joined First Division side Bradford City replacing Jim Jeffries as manager. He was sacked in November 2003 during which the club was in administration and second from bottom of league.

=== Grimsby Town ===
Law was appointed manager of Second Division Grimsby Town on 3 March 2004. The Mariners had recently dismissed Paul Groves and were struggling in the lower mid-table of the third-tier of English football following relegation from the First Division a few months earlier. He turned his attention to the transfer market and acquired John Thorrington, Alan Fettis, Paul Warhurst and Mickaël Antoine-Curier amongst others. However, in the final twelve games of the season Law only posted three victories, two draws and seven defeats which confined Grimsby to a second successive relegation. Law was dismissed as a result and was replaced by Russell Slade.

=== Alfreton Town ===
On 14 May 2007, he was appointed as manager of Alfreton Town. In March 2008 he was set to return to Bradford as manager of Bradford Park Avenue, until Park Avenue were forced to call off the deal and apologise to Alfreton Town.

On 25 May 2011, Law signed a new contract along with assistant Russ O'Neill keeping them with the club till June 2014.

=== Burnley ===
On 25 January 2017, it was announced that Law would join Premier League Burnley as head of national recruitment for 17-23 year olds.

=== Matlock Town ===
Law was appointed as manager of Matlock Town in 2024, however left via mutual consent

== Honours ==
=== As a player ===
Chesterfield

- Football League Third Division play-offs: 1995

=== Manager ===
Chesterfield

- Football League Third Division third place promotion: 2000–01

Buxton

- Northern Counties East Football League Premier Division: 2005–06
- Northern Premier League First Division: 2006–07

Alfreton Town

- Conference North: 2010–11
