= Russell Slade =

English football manager

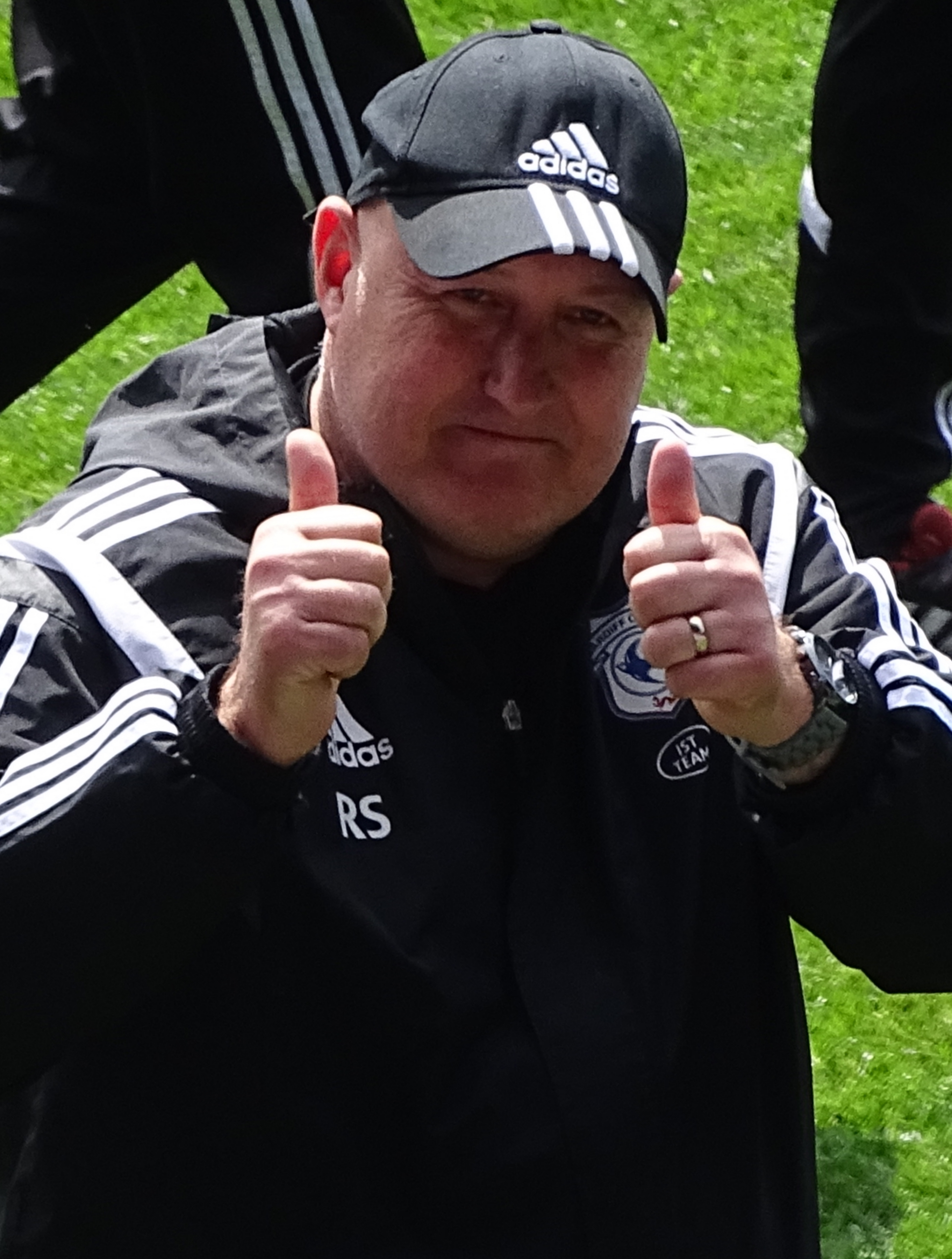
- Slade as manager of Cardiff City in 2016

Personal information
- Full name: Russell Mark Slade
- Date of birth: 10 October 1960 (age 66)
- Place of birth: Reading, England

Managerial career
- Years: Team
- 1994–1995: Notts County (caretaker)
- 1995–1996: Armitage
- 1996: Leicester United
- 1998: Sheffield United (caretaker)
- 1999: Sheffield United (caretaker)
- 2001–2004: Scarborough
- 2004–2006: Grimsby Town
- 2006–2009: Yeovil Town
- 2009: Brighton & Hove Albion
- 2010–2014: Leyton Orient
- 2014–2016: Cardiff City
- 2016: Charlton Athletic
- 2016–2017: Coventry City
- 2017–2018: Grimsby Town
- 2019–2020: Hereford

Russell Mark Slade (born 10 October 1960) is an English former professional football manager and coach.

Having had an extended career at reserve team level, Slade entered professional sports coaching with Notts County in 1993. He briefly took charge of the club as caretaker manager during the 1994–95 season. Slade then had spells in charge of non-league sides Armitage and Leicester United before joining the coaching staff of Sheffield United in 1997. He had two spells as caretaker manager of The Blades in 1998 and 1999 before the appointment of Neil Warnock. In 2001, he took over the managerial post at Conference National side Scarborough before later moving to Grimsby Town in 2004 and Yeovil Town in 2006. He was appointed manager of Brighton & Hove Albion in 2009 but the stay was brief and he was dismissed in November 2009.

In 2010, Slade was appointed manager of Leyton Orient and he led the club to two 7th-place finishes, an FA Cup fifth round replay against Arsenal and took the O's to the 2014 play-off final – a feat which saw win the LMA League 1 Manager of the Year award. He left Orient to take charge of Championship side Cardiff City, and spent two years in charge of the side, finishing in 11th and 8th positions, before being appointed the club's head of football. He resigned from the role after only two weeks and, in June 2016, was appointed manager of Charlton Athletic. He then went on to manage Coventry City, before returning to Grimsby Town once again between 2017 and 2018. His final managerial role to date was with non-league side Hereford, whom he departed in 2020.

Slade developed a reputation for being an effective man manager, and a very effective operator within the transfer market who never bought a player whilst at Leyton Orient, instead bringing in a number of players on free transfers.

== Career ==
=== Background ===
Slade started out as a PE teacher at Frank Wheldon School after studying Sport at Edge Hill University.

=== Notts County ===
Slade was assistant manager to Mick Walker at Notts County, and took over as caretaker manager when Walker was sacked in September 1994. When County appointed Howard Kendall as manager in January 1995, Slade stayed on as his assistant.

=== Sheffield United ===
Slade was then appointed manager of Midland Alliance side Armitage, then moving on to Southern Football League side Leicester United before having two separate spells as caretaker manager at Sheffield United.

=== Scarborough ===
Slade's first permanent managerial post was at Football Conference side Scarborough. When he arrived in November 2001 the club was adrift at the bottom of the Conference and looking doomed. His first match in charge resulted in a home win over Farnborough Town but the next three games yielded just one point. However a remarkable run of 39 points from the final 19 games of the season meant Scarborough finished 12th. He was hailed as a hero by the fans and his stock rose when taking the team to 4th position by Christmas in the 2002–03 season. In January 2003, two days after the club went into administration, Slade tendered his resignation. The fans presented a tearful Slade with a petition at the next game and on the Monday morning he changed his mind.

The following season saw mixed league performances, but a tremendous FA Cup run which saw victories over Hinckley United, Doncaster Rovers, Port Vale, and finally Southend United following a replay, meant a glamorous home tie in front of Premier League Chelsea. Despite losing 1–0 Slade's side had put up a tremendous battle.

=== Grimsby Town ===
At the end of the 2003–04 season, Grimsby Town decided not to renew the contract of manager Nicky Law following relegation into League Two. Slade was appointed as their new manager. A mid-table finish ensued in the 2004–05 season but despite some disgruntled fans calling for his head, Grimsby spent most of the 2005–06 season in an automatic promotion spot in League Two, also managing to topple both Derby County and Tottenham Hotspur in the League Cup. Town eventually finished the season in 4th place and had to settle for the playoffs, following a late Northampton Town equaliser meant that Leyton Orient would finish the season in the final automatic promotion places. Despite guiding his team to a semi-final victory over local rivals Lincoln City, Slade was unable to secure promotion, Grimsby losing 1–0 in the final against Cheltenham Town in the Millennium Stadium.

=== Yeovil Town ===
Slade's success with Grimsby had attracted League One side Yeovil Town, and Slade was appointed as the Somerset club's new manager. Slade led Yeovil to a surprise 5th-place finish play-off finish in the league, where they defeated favourites Nottingham Forest to reach the play-off final. However, Yeovil lost the final against Blackpool 2–0. Slade's successful first season at Yeovil saw him win the League One manager of the year award, and he was targeted by League One rivals Carlisle United and Millwall for their managerial positions but this interest was rejected by Yeovil chairman John Fry.

Slade left his post at Yeovil on 16 February 2009, despite having won four consecutive matches immediately prior to this. Slade had become frustrated with the club's lack of ambition, although the club chairman John Fry had previously stated that changes would be needed due to the current economic climate.

=== Brighton and Hove Albion ===
On 6 March 2009, Slade was appointed manager of struggling Brighton & Hove Albion until the end of the season, and succeeded in ensuring they avoided relegation from League One by beating Stockport 1–0 in the final game. Slade signed a further two-year contract at Brighton in May 2009.

=== Leyton Orient ===
Slade was appointed manager of Leyton Orient on 5 April 2010, six matches before the end of the season. The club was in danger of being relegated from League One, but Slade revived the club's fortunes, helping Leyton Orient to take 10 points from their last six matches, resulting in them avoiding relegation by a single point. Slade was rewarded with a new two-year contract on 14 May and the following season he guided Orient to seventh place, one point outside the play-off places, as well as a fifth round replay at Arsenal in the FA Cup. During the season, Orient chairman Barry Hearn rejected an approach from Barnsley for Slade. Leyton Orient were unable to match their previous year during the 2011–12 season and the club finished in 20th, but the next season Slade was able to guide them to another 7th-place finish.

On 7 June 2013, Leyton Orient announced that Slade, his assistant Kevin Nugent and chief scout Kevin Dearden had signed contract extensions to keep them at the club for a further three years, until the end of the 2015–16 season.

Slade guided Orient to 3rd place finish in the 2013–14 season, seeing Orient finish within the play-off spots. After beating Peterborough United 3–2 in the semi-finals, Orient lost the final to Rotherham United on penalties at Wembley.

=== Cardiff City ===
On 6 October 2014, Slade was appointed manager of Championship side Cardiff City on a two-year contract, replacing Ole Gunnar Solskjaer. The job was the highest level that Slade had ever managed at. Slade was tasked with reducing the club's wage bill, which was still inflated after the relegation from the Premier League in the previous season. Seven first team players left the club in his first three months in charge. Slade became unpopular with a large section of supporters and crowd numbers fell dramatically during his tenure at the club, as he finished 11th in his first season and 8th in his second. Despite his detractors, Slade insisted that the club had made progress under his stewardship and that he had "given the club stability".

On 6 May 2016, Slade was removed from his position of manager, and was instead named the club's head of football. He took charge of his last match for the Bluebirds on the final day of the 2015–16 season, drawing 1–1 with Birmingham City. Paul Trollope, a member of Slade's coaching staff, was appointed as the new head coach, but did not report to Slade on any first team matters. However, he resigned from the role on 3 June.

=== Charlton Athletic ===
On 6 June 2016, Slade signed a three-year contract to be manager of Charlton Athletic following their relegation to League One. On 14 November 2016, with the club in 15th place, the club announced that it had "parted company" with him, having won just five of the 21 games in all competitions of the season.

=== Coventry City ===
On 21 December 2016, Slade signed a contract until the end of the season to be manager of Coventry City. Slade joined with the club sitting 23rd in League One, amid protests by fans against the owners of the club. His first game in charge was a 4–1 defeat to Bristol Rovers on 26 December 2016.

In February 2017, he led Coventry to the final of the EFL Trophy, after beating Wycombe Wanderers in the semi-final at the Ricoh Arena.

The last minute equaliser by AFC Wimbledon on 14 February 2017 meant that Slade had equalled the record set by Noel Cantwell of nine games without a win at the start their reign as Coventry City manager.

Slade managed to gain his first league victory at the tenth attempt in a 2–1 home victory over Gillingham; this victory also ended Coventry's 15 match winless streak. He was sacked on 5 March 2017. He had managed Coventry for 16 games, of which they won only three.

=== Return to Grimsby Town ===
On 12 April 2017, Slade was appointed manager of Grimsby Town for the second time. Slade was sacked by Grimsby on 11 February 2018, after seeing the team fail to win in 12 league games, with eight losses, he left the team 17th in League Two.

=== Hereford ===
In August 2019, after 18 months out of management, Slade joined National League North side Hereford as their new club manager. On 20 January 2020, Slade left Hereford by mutual consent.

== Personal life ==
In 2021, Slade led a group of hundreds of footballers who were threatening legal advice against the data collection industry.

== Managerial statistics ==
As of match played 4 January 2020

Managerial record by team and tenure
Team	From	To	Record					Ref
Team	From	To	P	W	D	L	Win %	Ref
Notts County	15 September 1994	12 January 1995	23	6	5	12	26.1	
Sheffield United	2 March 1998	9 March 1998	2	0	1	1	0.0	
Sheffield United	23 November 1999	2 December 1999	3	0	1	2	0.0	
Scarborough	31 October 2001	28 May 2004	133	50	41	42	37.6	
Grimsby Town	28 May 2004	31 May 2006	105	41	30	34	39.0	
Yeovil Town	7 June 2006	16 February 2009	137	49	32	56	35.8	
Brighton & Hove Albion	6 March 2009	1 November 2009	31	9	7	15	29.0	
Leyton Orient	6 April 2010	24 September 2014	242	103	61	78	42.6	
Cardiff City	7 October 2014	18 May 2016	86	32	27	27	37.2	
Charlton Athletic	6 June 2016	14 November 2016	21	5	10	6	23.8	
Coventry City	21 December 2016	7 March 2017	16	3	5	8	18.8	
Grimsby Town	12 April 2017	11 February 2018	43	11	12	20	25.6	
Hereford	29 August 2019	20 January 2020	23	5	8	10	21.7	
Total			865	314	240	311	36.3	—

== Honours ==
=== As a Manager ===
Individual

- Football League One Manager of the Year: 2006–07, 2013–14
- Football League One Manager of the Month: March 2013, August 2013, January 2014
