= 2003–04 Grimsby Town F.C. season =

Grimsby Town
2003–04 season
- Chairman: Peter Furneaux
- Manager: Paul Groves (sacked 9 February 2004); Nicky Law (hired 4 March 2004)
- Stadium: Blundell Park
- Football League Div 2: 21st
- FA Cup: Second Round
- Football League Cup: First Round
- Football League Trophy: First Round
- Lincolnshire Senior Cup: Runners Up
- Copa de Ibiza: Winners
- Top goalscorer: League: Michael Boulding, Phil Jevons (12); All: Michael Boulding, Phil Jevons (13)
- Highest home attendance: 6,856 (1 May vs Brentford)
- Lowest home attendance: 3,535 (16 Sep vs Swindon Town)
Home colours	Away colours

The 2003–04 Grimsby Town F.C. season lists the results of the British association football team Grimsby Town F.C. in the 2003–04 season.

== Transfers ==
=== Transfers in ===
Date	Pos	Player	Transferred from	Fee	Ref
10 June 2002	DF	(England) Tony Crane	(England) Sheffield Wednesday	Free Transfer	
17 June 2002	MF	(Netherlands) Marcel Cas	(England) Sheffield United	Free Transfer	
1 July 2003	GK	(Northern Ireland) Aidan Davison	(England) Bradford City	Free Transfer	
2 July 2003	MF	(Scotland) Iain Anderson	(England) Preston North End	Free Transfer	
4 July 2003	MF	(England) Des Hamilton	(Wales) Cardiff City	Free Transfer	
7 August 2003	DF	(England) Mike Edwards	(England) Colchester United	Free Transfer	
7 August 2003	DF	(England) Jason Crowe	(England) Portsmouth	Free Transfer	
24 October 2003	FW	(Scotland) Iffy Onuora	(England) Sheffield United	Free Transfer	
11 March 2004	MF	(United States) John Thorrington	(England) Huddersfield Town	Free Transfer	
12 March 2004	MF	(England) Paul Warhurst	(England) Carlisle United	Free Transfer	
19 March 2004	FW	(France) Mickael Antoine-Curier	(England) Notts County	Free Transfer	
22 March 2004	MF	(Jamaica) Jamie Lawrence	(England) Walsall	Free Transfer	
25 March 2004	FW	(England) Isaiah Rankin	(England) Barnsley	Free Transfer	

=== Loans in ===
Date	Pos	Player	Transferred from	Date Until	Ref
8 August 2003	FW	(Netherlands) Laurens ten Heuvel	(England) Sheffield United	1 September 2003	
19 September 2003	MF	(England) Nick Daws	(England) Rotherham United	22 October 2003	
19 September 2003	FW	(Scotland) Iffy Onuora	(England) Sheffield United	24 October 2003	
17 January 2004	FW	(England) Nick Daws	(England) Rotherham United	7 March 2004	
7 February 2004	FW	(England) Lee Thorpe	(England) Leyton Orient	11 March 2004	
13 February 2004	FW	(England) Isaiah Rankin	(England) Barnsley	24 March 2004	
23 February 2004	DF	(England) Craig Armstrong	(England) Sheffield Wednesday	9 May 2004	
11 March 2004	GK	(Northern Ireland) Alan Fettis	(England) Hull City	9 May 2004	

=== Transfers out ===
Date	Pos	Player	Transferred To	Fee	Ref
3 July 2003	GK	(Wales) Danny Coyne	(England) Leicester City	Free Transfer	
3 July 2003	FW	(England) Steve Livingstone	(England) Carlisle United	Released	
17 July 2003	DF	(Cape Verde) Georges Santos	(England) Ipswich Town	Free Transfer	
1 August 2003	MF	(England) Stephen Downes	(England) York City	Released	
4 August 2003	FW	(England) Chris Thompson	(England) Northwich Victoria	Released	
5 August 2003	GK	(England) Steve Croudson	(England) Boston United	Released	
7 August 2003	DF	(England) Steve Chettle	(England) Burton Albion	Released	
8 August 2003	MF	(England) Terry Cooke	(England) Sheffield Wednesday	Released	
8 August 2003	DF	(England) Tony Gallimore	(England) Barnsley	Released	
19 September 2003	FW	(United States) Jake Sagare	(England) Halifax Town	Released	
1 January 2004	GK	(England) Bradley Hughes		Released	
16 January 2004	MF	(England) Alan Pouton	(England) Gillingham	£30,000	
31 January 2004	MF	(Netherlands) Marcel Cas	(Netherlands) RBC Roosendaal	Free Transfer	
12 February 2004	MF	(England) Michael Boulding	(England) Barnsley	£50,000 + Rankin on 1 month loan.	
19 February 2004	FW	(Scotland) Iffy Onuora	(England) Tranmere Rovers	Released	
24 March 2004	MF	(England) Paul Groves	(England) Scunthorpe United	Released	
25 March 2004	MF	(England) Des Hamilton	(England) Barnet	Released	

=== Loans out ===
Date	Pos	Player	Transferred To	Date Until	Ref
27 February 2004	FW	(England) Paul Groves	(England) Scunthorpe United	24 March 2004	

== League table ==
Pos	Team	Pld	W	D	L	GF	GA	GD	Pts	Promotion or relegation
19	Stockport County	46	11	19	16	62	70	−8	52	
20	Chesterfield	46	12	15	19	49	71	−22	51	
21	Grimsby Town (R)	46	13	11	22	55	81	−26	50	Relegation to Football League Two
22	Rushden & Diamonds (R)	46	13	9	24	60	74	−14	48	Relegation to Football League Two
23	Notts County (R)	46	10	12	24	50	78	−28	42	Relegation to Football League Two

Rules for classification: In the Football League goals scored (GF) takes precedence over goal difference (GD).
(R) Relegated

== Fixtures and results ==
=== Pre-season matches ===
==== Copa de Ibiza ====
Date	Opponent	Venue	Result	Attendance	Scorers
8 July 2003	SD Portmany	Sant Antoni de Portmany, Ibiza, Spain	W 1 - 0	approx. 1,000	Hockless
10 July 2003	San Rafael	Sant Antoni de Portmany, Ibiza, Spain	W 1 - 0	-	Hockless

==== Friendlies ====
Date	Opponent	Venue	Result	Attendance	Scorers
15 July 2003	Lincoln City	Blundell Park, Cleethorpes	W 1 - 0	-	O'Halloran
19 July 2003	Sunderland	Blundell Park, Cleethorpes	D 1 - 1	-	Crane
23 July 2003	Hull City	KC Stadium, Kingston upon Hull	W 1 - 0	-	Boulding
26 July 2003	Boston United	York Street, Boston	W 2 - 1	-	ten Heuvel, Rowan
26 July 2003	Barton Town	The Euronics Ground, Barton upon Humber	W 3 - 0	-	N/A
29 July 2003	Halifax Town	Blundell Park, Cleethorpes	W 2 - 1	-	Anderson, Mansaram
1 August 2003	Middlesbrough	Blundell Park, Cleethorpes	W 2 - 1	-	Boulding, Crowe

=== Football League Division Two ===
Date	Opponent	Venue	Result	Attendance	Scorers
9 August 2003	Plymouth Argyle	Home Park, Plymouth	D 2 - 2	9,590	Boulding, Anderson
16 August 2003	Port Vale	Blundell Park, Cleethorpes	L 1 - 2	4,816	Boulding
23 August 2003	Luton Town	Kenilworth Road, Luton	W 2 - 1	5,827	Anderson, Boulding
25 August 2003	Wycombe Wanderers	Blundell Park, Cleethorpes	W 3 - 1	4,512	Boulding, Cas, Barnard
30 August 2003	Bristol City	Ashton Gate, Bristol	L 0 - 1	10,033	-
6 September 2003	Peterborough United	Blundell Park, Cleethorpes	D 1 - 1	4,710	Boulding
12 September 2003	Hartlepool United	Victoria Park, Hartlepool	L 1 - 8	5,528	Rowan
16 September 2003	Swindon Town	Blundell Park, Cleethorpes	L 1 - 2	3,535	Boulding
20 September 2003	Chesterfield	Blundell Park, Cleethorpes	W 4 - 0	4,141	Campbell, Cas, Hockless, Edwards
27 September 2003	Sheffield Wednesday	Hillsborough Stadium, Sheffield	D 0 - 0	21,918	-
30 September 2003	Blackpool	Bloomfield Road, Blackpool	W 1 - 0	5,491	Crane
4 October 2003	Queens Park Rangers	Blundell Park, Cleethorpes	L 0 - 1	5,447	-
10 October 2003	Brighton & Hove Albion	Withdean Stadium, Brighton	L 0 - 3	6,286	-
18 October 2003	Colchester United	Blundell Park, Cleethorpes	W 2 - 0	5,021	Onuora, Boulding
21 October 2003	Notts County	Blundell Park, Cleethorpes	W 2 - 0	4,274	Boulding (2)
25 October 2003	Barnsley	Oakwell, Barnsley	D 0 - 0	10,092	-
1 November 2003	Rushden and Diamonds	Nene Park, Irthlingborough	L 1 - 3	4,185	Anderson
15 November 2003	Stockport County	Blundell Park, Cleethorpes	D 1 - 1	4,014	Mansaram
22 November 2003	Brentford	Griffin Park, Brentford, London	W 3 - 1	4,685	Onuora, Boulding (2)
29 November 2003	Tranmere Rovers	Blundell Park, Cleethorpes	L 0 - 1	4,406	-
13 December 2003	A.F.C. Bournemouth	Dean Court, Bournemouth	D 0 - 0	5,837	-
26 December 2003	Oldham Athletic	Blundell Park, Cleethorpes	D 3 - 3	6,172	Jevons (2), Boulding
28 December 2003	Peterborough United	London Road, Peterborough	D 0 - 0	5,245	-
3 January 2004	Wycombe Wanderers	Adams Park, Wycombe	L 1 - 4	4,519	Onuora
10 January 2004	Plymouth Argyle	Blundell Park, Cleethorpes	D 0 - 0	5,007	-
17 January 2004	Port Vale	Vale Park, Burslem	L 1 - 5	5,133	Jevons
20 January 2004	Wrexham	Blundell Park, Cleethorpes	L 1 - 3	3,572	Jevons
8 February 2004	Oldham Athletic	Boundary Park, Oldham	L 0 - 6	13,007	-
14 February 2004	Brighton & Hove Albion	Blundell Park, Cleethorpes	W 2 - 1	3,673	Rankin, Jevons
17 February 2004	Bristol City	Blundell Park, Cleethorpes	L 1 - 2	5,272	Anderson
21 February 2004	Colchester United	Layer Road, Colchester	L 0 - 2	2,922	-
24 February 2004	Luton Town	Blundell Park, Cleethorpes	W 3 - 2	3,143	Jevons (2), Ford
28 February 2004	Barnsley	Blundell Park, Cleethorpes	W 6 - 1	5,603	Jevons (4), Armstrong, Rankin
2 March 2004	Notts County	Meadow Lane, Nottingham	L 1 - 3	6,011	Crane
6 March 2004	Wrexham	The Racecourse Ground, Wrexham	L 0 - 3	3,127	-
13 March 2004	AFC Bournemouth	Blundell Park, Cleethorpes	D 1 - 1	5,015	Rowan
17 March 2004	Swindon Town	County Ground, Swindon	L 0 - 2	6,954	-
20 March 2004	Hartlepool United	Blundell Park, Cleethorpes	L 0 - 2	4,303	-
27 March 2004	Chesterfield	Saltergate, Chesterfield	D 4 - 4	4,444	Lawrence, Barnard, Anderson, Rankin
4 April 2004	Sheffield Wednesday	Blundell Park, Cleethorpes	W 2 - 0	6,641	Mansaram, Crane
10 April 2004	Queens Park Rangers	Loftus Road, Shepherd's Bush, London	L 0 - 3	14,488	-
12 April 2004	Blackpool	Blundell Park, Cleethorpes	L 0 - 2	4,775	-
17 April 2004	Rushden and Diamonds	Blundell Park, Cleethorpes	W 1 - 0	3,890	Jevons
25 April 2004	Stockport County	Edgeley Park, Stockport	L 1 - 2	5,924	Hockless
1 May 2004	Brentford	Blundell Park, Cleethorpes	W 1 - 0	6,856	Rankin
8 May 2004	Tranmere Rovers	Prenton Park, Wirral	L 1 - 2	10,301	Mansaram

=== FA Cup ===
Date	Opponent	Venue	Result	Attendance	Scorers
8 November 2003	Queens Park Rangers	Blundell Park, Cleethorpes	W 1 - 0	4,144	Boulding
6 December 2003	Peterborough United	London Road, Peterborough	L 2 - 3	4,836	Jevons, Cas

=== League Cup ===
Date	Opponent	Venue	Result	Attendance	Scorers
12 August 2003	Doncaster Rovers	Belle Vue, Doncaster	L 2 - 3	6,057	Campbell, Anderson

=== Football League Trophy ===
Date	Opponent	Venue	Result	Attendance	Scorers
15 October 2003	Sheffield Wednesday	Hillsborough Stadium, Sheffield	D 1 - 1	7,323	Mansaram Sheff Wed win 5–4 on penalties

== Squad overview ==
Note: Flags indicate national team as defined under FIFA eligibility rules; some limited exceptions apply. Players may hold more than one non-FIFA nationality.

No.	Pos.	Nation	Player
1	GK	NIR	Aidan Davison
2	DF	ENG	John McDermott
3	DF	WAL	Darren Barnard
4	DF	JAM	Simon Ford
5	DF	ENG	Tony Crane
6	MF	NED	Marcel Cas (Departed in January 2004)
7	MF	ENG	Alan Pouton (Departed in January 2004)
7	DF	ENG	Craig Armstrong (on loan from Sheffield Wednesday)
8	MF	SCO	Stuart Campbell
9	FW	ENG	Michael Boulding (Departed in February 2004)
9	MF	ENG	Paul Warhurst
10	FW	ENG	Darren Mansaram
11	MF	ENG	Stacy Coldicott
12	FW	ENG	Phil Jevons
13	GK	ENG	Andrew Pettinger
14	MF	ENG	Chris Bolder
15	FW	ENG	Jonathan Rowan
16	DF	ENG	Greg Young
17	DF	ENG	Kirk Wheeler
18	MF	ENG	Graham Hockless
19	DF	ENG	Iain Ward
20	MF	ENG	Des Hamilton (Departed in March 2004)

No.	Pos.	Nation	Player
21	MF	SCO	Iain Anderson
22	MF	ENG	Paul Groves (Player/manager until February 2004)
23	DF	ENG	Wes Parker
24	FW	ENG	David Soames
25	DF	ENG	Mike Edwards
26	DF	ENG	Jason Crowe
27	FW	NED	Laurens ten Heuvel (on loan from Sheffield United)
27	MF	USA	John Thorrington
28	MF	ENG	Ashley Hildred
29	FW	ENG	Giovanni Carchedi
30	GK	ENG	Bradley Hughes (Departed in November 2003)
30	GK	NIR	Alan Fettis (on loan from Hull City)
31	FW	ENG	Liam Nimmo
32	MF	ENG	Nick Daws (on loan from Rotherham United)
32	MF	JAM	Jamie Lawrence
33	FW	ENG	Lee Thorpe (on loan from Leyton Orient)
33	FW	FRA	Mickael Antoine-Curier
34	FW	ENG	Isaiah Rankin
35	MF	ENG	Nick Hegarty
39	FW	SCO	Iffy Onuora (Departed in February 2004)
--	GK	ENG	Paul Fraser

=== Appearances and goals ===
No.	Pos	Nat	Player	Total		Division Two		League Cup		Football League Trophy		FA Cup	
No.	Pos	Nat	Player	Apps	Goals	Apps	Goals	Apps	Goals	Apps	Goals	Apps	Goals
1	GK	(Northern Ireland) NIR	Aidan Davison	36	0	32	0	1	0	1	0	2	0
2	DF	(England) ENG	John McDermott	23	0	21	0	0	0	0	0	2	0
3	DF	(Wales) WAL	Darren Barnard	38	2	34	2	1	0	1	0	2	0
4	DF	(Jamaica) JAM	Simon Ford	28	1	26	1	1	0	1	0	0	0
5	DF	(England) ENG	Tony Crane	40	3	37	3	1	0	0	0	2	0
6	MF	(Netherlands) NED	Marcel Cas	23	3	19	2	1	0	1	0	2	1
7	MF	(England) ENG	Alan Pouton	5	0	5	0	0	0	0	0	0	0
7	DF	(England) ENG	Craig Armstrong (on loan from Sheffield Wednesday)	9	1	9	1	0	0	0	0	0	0
8	FW	(Scotland) SCO	Stuart Campbell	43	1	39	1	1	0	1	0	2	0
9	FW	(England) ENG	Michael Boulding	30	13	27	12	1	0	1	0	1	1
9	MF	(England) ENG	Paul Warhurst	7	0	7	0	0	0	0	0	0	0
10	FW	(England) ENG	Darren Mansaram	34	4	31	3	1	0	1	0	1	1
11	MF	(England) ENG	Stacy Coldicott	14	0	14	0	0	0	0	0	0	0
12	FW	(England) ENG	Phil Jevons	30	13	29	12	0	0	0	0	1	1
13	GK	(England) ENG	Andrew Pettinger	3	0	3	0	0	0	0	0	0	0
14	MF	(England) ENG	Chris Bolder	7	0	7	0	0	0	0	0	0	0
15	FW	(England) ENG	Jonathan Rowan	14	2	14	2	0	0	0	0	0	0
16	DF	(England) ENG	Greg Young	19	0	17	0	1	0	0	0	1	0
17	DF	(England) ENG	Kirk Wheeler	0	0	0	0	0	0	0	0	0	0
18	MF	(England) ENG	Graham Hockless	13	2	13	2	0	0	0	0	0	0
19	DF	(England) ENG	Iain Ward	0	0	0	0	0	0	0	0	0	0
20	MF	(England) ENG	Des Hamilton	31	0	27	0	1	0	1	0	2	0
21	MF	(Scotland) SCO	Iain Anderson	33	6	29	5	1	1	1	0	2	0
22	MF	(England) ENG	Paul Groves	12	0	11	0	1	0	0	0	0	0
23	DF	(England) ENG	Wes Parker	4	0	4	0	0	0	0	0	0	0
24	FW	(England) ENG	David Soames	10	0	10	0	0	0	0	0	0	0
25	DF	(England) ENG	Mike Edwards	36	1	33	1	1	0	0	0	2	0
26	DF	(England) ENG	Jason Crowe	36	0	32	0	1	0	1	0	2	0
27	FW	(Netherlands) NED	Laurens ten Heuvel (on loan from Sheffield United)	5	0	4	0	1	0	0	0	0	0
27	MF	(United States) USA	John Thorrington	3	0	3	0	0	0	0	0	0	0
28	MF	(England) ENG	Ashley Hildred	0	0	0	0	0	0	0	0	0	0
29	FW	(England) ENG	Giovanni Carchedi	0	0	0	0	0	0	0	0	0	0
30	GK	(England) ENG	Bradley Hughes	0	0	0	0	0	0	0	0	0	0
30	GK	(Northern Ireland) NIR	Alan Fettis (on loan from Hull City)	11	0	11	0	0	0	0	0	0	0
31	FW	(England) ENG	Liam Nimmo	2	0	2	0	0	0	0	0	0	0
32	MF	(England) ENG	Nick Daws (on loan from Rotherham United)	18	0	17	0	0	0	1	0	0	0
32	MF	(Jamaica) JAM	Jamie Lawrence	5	1	5	1	0	0	0	0	0	0
33	FW	(England) ENG	Lee Thorpe (on loan from Leyton Orient)	6	0	6	0	0	0	0	0	0	0
33	FW	(France) FRA	Mickael Antoine-Curier	5	0	5	0	0	0	0	0	0	0
34	FW	(England) ENG	Isaiah Rankin	12	4	12	4	0	0	0	0	0	0
35	MF	(England) ENG	Nick Hegarty	0	0	0	0	0	0	0	0	0	0
39	FW	(Scotland) SCO	Iffy Onuora	22	3	19	3	1	0	0	0	2	0
#	GK	(England) ENG	Paul Fraser	0	0	0	0	0	0	0	0	0	0
