= 2001–02 Grimsby Town F.C. season =

Grimsby Town
2001–02 season
- Chairman: Peter Furneaux
- Manager: Lennie Lawrence (until 28 December); Paul Groves (from 28 December)
- Stadium: Blundell Park
- First Division: 19th
- FA Cup: Third Round
- League Cup: Fourth Round
- Top goalscorer: League: Boulding (11); All: Boulding (11)
- Average home league attendance: 6,430

During the 2001–02 English football season, Grimsby Town competed in the Football League First Division.

== Season summary ==
During the opening weeks of the 2001–02 season, Grimsby briefly led the First Division, sparking hopes that Lawrence could repeat the promotion success he achieved at Charlton Athletic and Middlesbrough with a much smaller club. One major highlight in the season was when Grimsby picked up a shock 2–1 win over Liverpool in extra time at Anfield in the League Cup thanks to a wonder strike from Phil Jevons in the last minute. However, after a 5–0 heavy loss to Crystal Palace, ambitious promotion hopes were quickly extinguished as Grimsby's form hit a major decline with only one win in their next 18 league games which saw Grimsby sit 23rd in the table and Lawrence was sacked as a result and Paul Groves was named player-manager. Groves brought in Graham Rodger as his assistant and made successful loan signings which included Andy Todd and Martin Pringle both from Charlton and Grimsby's results steadily improved as Groves steered them to safety.

== Transfers ==
=== Transfers in ===
Date	Pos	Player	Transferred from	Fee	Ref
6 July 2001	FW	(England) Phil Jevons	(England) Everton	£250,000	
1 August 2001	MF	(England) Chris Bolder	(England) Hull City	Free Transfer	
1 August 2001	MF	(England) Graham Hockless	(England) Hull City	Free Transfer	
1 August 2001	DF	(Jamaica) Simon Ford	(England) Charlton Athletic	Free Transfer	
1 August 2001	GK	(Republic of Ireland) Morgan Cranley	(Republic of Ireland) Shelbourne	Free Transfer	
1 August 2001	DF	(England) David Morgan	(England) Sunderland	Free Transfer	
1 August 2001	MF	(England) Ross Thompson	(England) Scunthorpe United	Free Transfer	
1 August 2001	MF	(Netherlands) Robbie Busscher	(Netherlands) Feyenoord	Free Transfer	
6 July 2001	GK	(Netherlands) Ronald Ermes	(Netherlands) Feyenoord	Free Transfer	
24 August 2000	FW	(England) Michael Boulding	(England) Mansfield Town	Free Transfer	
19 October 2001	DF	(Wales) Alan Neilson	(England) Fulham	Free Transfer	
30 October 2001	FW	(England) Chris Thompson	(England) Liverpool	Free Transfer	
23 March 2002	FW	(Scotland) Willie Falconer	(Scotland) St. Johnstone	Free Transfer	

=== Loans in ===
Date	Pos	Player	Transferred from	Date Until	Ref
9 August 2001	DF	(England) David Beharall	(England) Newcastle United	9 November 2001	
9 August 2001	FW	(England) Paul Robinson	(England) Newcastle United	27 October 2001	
7 September 2001	DF	(England) Marlon Broomes	(England) Blackburn Rovers	7 December 2001	
17 January 2002	FW	(England) Robert Taylor	(England) Wolverhampton Wanderers	17 February 2002	
21 February 2002	FW	(Sweden) Martin Pringle	(England) Charlton Athletic	27 February 2002	
21 February 2002	MF	(England) Andy Todd	(England) Charlton Athletic	22 April 2002	
28 March 2002	MF	(England) Terry Cooke	(England) Manchester City	22 April 2002	

=== Transfers out ===
Date	Pos	Player	Transferred To	Fee	Ref
22 May 2001	MF	(Northern Ireland) Kingsley Black	(England) Lincoln City	Released	
31 May 2001	DF	(England) Richard Smith	Retired	Released	
8 June 2001	MF	(England) Matthew Bloomer	(England) Hull City	Released	
2 July 2001	MF	(England) Kevin Donovan	(England) Barnsley	Free Transfer	
9 July 2000	MF	(England) Andy Smith	(England) Lincoln City	Released	
10 July 2001	DF	(Scotland) Peter Handyside	(England) Stoke City	Free Transfer	
20 July 2001	FW	(Republic of Ireland) Daryl Clare	(England) Boston United	Released	
23 July 2001	MF	(England) Adam Buckley	(England) Lincoln City	Released	
1 January 2002	GK	(Netherlands) Ronald Ermes	(Netherlands) SC Feyenoord	Released	
1 January 2002	MF	(Netherlands) Robbie Busscher	(Netherlands) Stormvogels Telstar	Released	
1 January 2002	GK	(Republic of Ireland) Morgan Cranley	(Republic of Ireland) Shelbourne	Released	
22 February 2002	DF	(Wales) Alan Neilson	(England) Luton Town	Released	
21 March 2002	DF	(England) David Morgan	(England) Gateshead	Released	

=== Loans out ===
Date	Pos	Player	Transferred To	Date Until	Ref
16 August 2001	GK	(England) Steve Croudson	(England) Scunthorpe United	16 September 2001	
13 March 2002	FW	(England) Mike Jeffrey	(England) Scunthorpe United	21 April 2022	

== Final league table ==
Pos	Team	Pld	W	D	L	GF	GA	GD	Pts
17	Portsmouth	46	13	14	19	60	72	−12	53
18	Walsall	46	13	12	21	51	71	−20	51
19	Grimsby Town	46	12	14	20	50	72	−22	50
20	Sheffield Wednesday	46	12	14	20	49	71	−22	50
21	Rotherham United	46	10	19	17	52	66	−14	49

Rules for classification: 1) Points; 2) Goal difference; 3) Goals scored

Results summary

Overall								Home						Away					
Pld	W	D	L	GF	GA	GD	Pts	W	D	L	GF	GA	GD	W	D	L	GF	GA	GD
46	12	14	20	50	72	−22	50	9	7	7	34	28	+6	3	7	13	16	44	−28

Source: 2001–02 Football League First Division table

Results by round

Round	1	2	3	4	5	6	7	8	9	10	11	12	13	14	15	16	17	18	19	20	21	22	23	24	25	26	27	28	29	30	31	32	33	34	35	36	37	38	39	40	41	42	43	44	45	46
Ground	H	A	H	A	H	A	H	A	A	H	A	H	A	H	A	H	H	A	A	H	A	H	H	A	A	H	H	A	H	A	A	H	A	H	A	H	H	A	H	A	H	A	H	A	H	A
Result	W	W	D	L	W	W	D	L	D	L	L	L	L	L	L	W	L	L	D	D	L	L	D	L	D	L	W	D	D	L	D	L	L	W	D	W	W	L	D	W	W	L	D	D	W	L
Position	9	4	4	9	1	2	3	6	6	8	12	12	15	18	18	15	19	19	19	19	21	22	21	23	23	23	22	22	23	23	23	23	23	23	23	22	22	22	22	21	19	20	20	21	18	19

Source: 11v11.com: 2001-02 Grimsby Town results
A = Away; H = Home; W = Win; D = Draw; L = Loss

== Results ==
Grimsby Town's score comes first

=== Legend ===
Win	Draw	Loss

=== Football League First Division ===
Date	Opponent	Venue	Result	Attendance	Scorers
11 August 2001	Crewe Alexandra	H	1–0	5,368	Burnett
18 August 2001	West Bromwich Albion	A	1–0	17,971	Pouton (pen)
25 August 2001	Preston North End	H	2–2	5,789	Rowan, Pouton (pen)
27 August 2001	Portsmouth	A	2–4	13,614	Butterfield, Jeffrey
1 September 2001	Barnsley	H	1–0	6,173	Jevons
8 September 2001	Coventry City	A	1–0	14,980	Jevons
15 September 2001	Nottingham Forest	H	0–0	8,746	
18 September 2001	Crystal Palace	A	0–5	13,970	
22 September 2001	Stockport County	A	3–3	7,834	Rowan, Burnett, Campbell
25 September 2001	Gillingham	H	1–2	4,859	Allen
29 September 2001	Bradford City	A	2–3	13,778	Rowan, Boulding
5 October 2001	Rotherham United	H	0–2	6,662	
13 October 2001	Sheffield United	A	1–3	15,442	Willems
20 October 2001	Watford	H	0–3	5,506	
23 October 2001	Manchester City	A	0–4	30,797	
26 October 2001	Birmingham City	H	3–1	5,419	Boulding (2), Jevons
30 October 2001	Norwich City	H	0–2	5,489	
3 November 2001	Wimbledon	A	1–2	6,189	Campbell
10 November 2001	Sheffield Wednesday	A	0–0	17,507	
17 November 2001	Millwall	H	2–2	5,037	Rowan, Boulding
23 November 2001	Burnley	A	0–1	18,535	
1 December 2001	Manchester City	H	0–2	7,960	
7 December 2001	Wolverhampton Wanderers	H	1–1	5,143	Jevons
15 December 2001	Walsall	A	0–4	5,080	
22 December 2001	Preston North End	A	0–0	14,667	
26 December 2001	Coventry City	H	0–1	7,568	
29 December 2001	Portsmouth	H	3–1	5,217	Jevons (2, 1 pen), Ford
1 January 2002	Barnsley	A	0–0	13,325	
12 January 2002	West Bromwich Albion	H	0–0	6,011	
19 January 2002	Crewe Alexandra	A	0–2	5,974	
29 January 2002	Rotherham United	A	1–1	6,098	Taylor
2 February 2002	Bradford City	H	0–1	5,054	
10 February 2002	Watford	A	0–2	12,163	
16 February 2002	Sheffield United	H	1–0	7,141	Campbell
23 February 2002	Nottingham Forest	A	0–0	21,081	
26 February 2002	Stockport County	H	3–1	6,836	Todd, Groves, Allen
2 March 2002	Crystal Palace	H	5–2	5,924	Todd, Allen, Boulding, Fleming (own goal), Smith
5 March 2002	Gillingham	A	1–2	7,025	Boulding
9 March 2002	Walsall	H	2–2	7,016	Groves, Roper (own goal)
16 March 2002	Wolverhampton Wanderers	A	1–0	25,967	Todd
23 March 2002	Wimbledon	H	6–2	6,473	Boulding (3), Pouton (3, 2 pens)
30 March 2002	Birmingham City	A	0–4	23,249	
1 April 2002	Sheffield Wednesday	H	0–0	9,236	
6 April 2002	Norwich City	A	1–1	20,075	Cooke
13 April 2002	Burnley	H	3–1	9,275	Boulding (2), Allen
21 April 2002	Millwall	A	1–3	17,004	Butterfield

=== FA Cup ===
Round	Date	Opponent	Venue	Result	Attendance	Scorers
Third round	5 January 2002	York City	H	0–0	5,052	
Third round replay	15 January 2002	York City	A	0–1	6,638	

=== Football League Cup ===
Round	Date	Opponent	Venue	Result	Attendance	Scorers
First round	21 August 2001	Lincoln City	H	2–1	5,906	Jevons, Rowan
Second round	11 September 2001	Sheffield United	H	3–3 (won 4–2 on pens)	5,236	Broomes, Jeffrey, Allen
Third round	9 October 2001	Liverpool	A	2–1 (a.e.t.)	32,672	Broomes, Jevons
Fourth round	27 November 2001	Arsenal	A	0–2	16,917	

== First-team squad ==
Squad at end of season

Note: Flags indicate national team as defined under FIFA eligibility rules; some limited exceptions apply. Players may hold more than one non-FIFA nationality.

No.	Pos.	Nation	Player
1	GK	WAL	Danny Coyne
2	DF	ENG	John McDermott (captain)
3	DF	ENG	Tony Gallimore
4	DF	ENG	Andy Todd (on loan from Charlton Athletic)
6	MF	ENG	Wayne Burnett
7	MF	ENG	Alan Pouton
8	MF	ENG	David Smith
9	FW	ENG	Michael Jeffrey
10	MF	SCO	Stuart Campbell
11	MF	ENG	Paul Groves (Player manager from 28 December)
12	DF	ENG	Danny Butterfield
13	GK	ENG	Steve Croudson
14	FW	ENG	Steve Livingstone
15	DF	ENG	Paul Raven
16	MF	ENG	Stacy Coldicott
17	MF	NED	Menno Willems

No.	Pos.	Nation	Player
18	FW	SCO	Willie Falconer
19	FW	ENG	Bradley Allen
20	FW	ENG	Jonathan Rowan
21	FW	ENG	Phil Jevons
22	DF	ENG	Ben Chapman
23	FW	ENG	Chris Thompson
24	DF	ENG	Iain Ward
25	DF	ENG	Simon Ford
26	MF	ENG	Terry Cooke (on loan from Manchester City)
27	MF	NED	Robbie Busscher
28	FW	ENG	Paul Robinson (on loan from Wimbledon)
29	MF	ENG	Chris Bolder
30	MF	ENG	Graham Hockless
31	FW	ENG	Robert Taylor
32	MF	ENG	Gary Moran
35	FW	ENG	Michael Boulding

=== Left club during season ===
Note: Flags indicate national team as defined under FIFA eligibility rules; some limited exceptions apply. Players may hold more than one non-FIFA nationality.

No.	Pos.	Nation	Player
18	MF	ENG	Adam Buckley (to Lincoln City)
34	DF	ENG	David Beharall (on loan from Newcastle United)
4	DF	ENG	Marlon Broomes (on loan from Blackburn Rovers)
18	DF	ENG	Robert Taylor (on loan from Wolves)
5	DF	WAL	Alan Neilson (to Luton Town)

No.	Pos.	Nation	Player
18	FW	SWE	Martin Pringle (on loan from Charlton Athletic)
26	GK	NED	Ronald Ermes (Released)
28	DF	ENG	David Morgan (to Gateshead)
33	GK	IRL	Morgan Cranley (Released)
31	MF	ENG	Ross Thompson (to Doncaster Rovers)

== Squad statistics ==
No.	Pos.	Name	League		FA Cup		League Cup		Total	
No.	Pos.	Name	Apps	Goals	Apps	Goals	Apps	Goals	Apps	Goals
1	GK	(Wales) Danny Coyne	45	0	2	0	4	0	51	0
