= Liam Nimmo =

English footballer (born 1984)

Personal information
- Date of birth: 28 December 1984 (age 41)
- Place of birth: Boston, England
- Position: Striker

Youth career
- 2001–2003: Grimsby Town

Senior career*
Years	Team	Apps	(Gls)
2003–2004	Grimsby Town	2	(0)
2004–2005	Spalding United	38	(19)
2005–2007	Wisbech Town	46	(33)
2007	Holbeach United	25	(27)
2007–2008	Gainsborough Trinity		
2008	Holbeach United		
2008–2009	Bourne Town		
2009–2010	Holbeach United		
2010–2011	Boston Town		
2011–2012	Wisbech Town		
2012–2013	Holbeach United		
2012	→ Fishtoft (loan)		
2013–2014	Boston Town		
- * Club domestic league appearances and goals

Liam Nimmo (born 28 December 1984) is an English former footballer who played as a striker.

He played in the Football League for Grimsby Town during the 2003–2004 season.

== Career ==
Nimmo was born in Boston, Lincolnshire. He began his football career at Grimsby Town and earned himself a professional contract in October 2003. He was added to a squad which was rich with attacking force and boasted such players as Iffy Onuora, Michael Boulding, Phil Jevons and Isaiah Rankin.

On 12 September 2003, Nimmo made his Grimsby debut, as a 61st-minute substitute for Jonathan Rowan in an 8–1 defeat at Hartlepool United in League One. Nimmo played in Grimsby's next game, again as substitute, but that was his last first-team appearance before he was released at the end of the season.

In August 2004 he signed for Spalding United, finishing the season as their leading scorer, before joining Wisbech Town in June 2005. After two prolific seasons at Wisbech, he joined Holbeach United. After a few months at Holbeach where his goalscoring continued, Nimmo chose to move to Conference North club Gainsborough Trinity, three levels above Holbeach in the league structure. After turning down a move to Boston United, Nimmo returned to Holbeach in July 2008, feeling that a back injury prevented him doing himself justice at the higher level. He walked out of the club shortly after the start of the 2008–09 season and joined Bourne Town, but returned to Holbeach once more after only one game for Bourne.

Nimmo moved on to Bourne Town, before moving back to Holbeach in 2009. He moved to Boston Town in 2010, and in July 2011 he signed for Wisbech Town.
