= Andrew Love =

Andrew or Andy Love may refer to:

- Andrew Love (baseball) (1907–1986), American baseball player
- Andrew Love (musician) (1941–2012), American saxophone player
- Andy Love (jazz vocalist) (né Andrew Jackson Love; 1911–1982), jazz vocalist with the Tune Twisters
- Andy Love (singer) (active 1998–2000), British singer (Northern Line)
- Andrew C. Love (1894–1987), producer and director of radio theater for NBC national broadcasts
- Andy Love (fl. 1990s–2010s), British politician
- Andy Love (English footballer) (born 1979), English footballer
- Andy Love (Scottish footballer) (1905–1962), Scottish football winger
