= Marcel Cas =

Dutch footballer

Personal information
- Full name: Marcel Cas
- Date of birth: 30 April 1972 (age 54)
- Place of birth: Breda, Netherlands
- Height: 6 ft 01 in (1.85 m)
- Position: Midfielder

Team information
- Current team: Feyenoord (Fitness Coach)

Senior career*
Years	Team	Apps	(Gls)
1995–2001	RBC	121	(13)
2001–2003	Notts County	56	(8)
2003	Sheffield United	6	(0)
2003–2004	Grimsby Town	19	(2)
2004	RBC	16	(1)
2004–2005	FC Den Bosch	22	(1)
Total		240	(25)
- * Club domestic league appearances and goals as of 18:03, 18 June 2008 (UTC) ‡ National team caps and goals as of 23:33, 20 March 2008 (UTC)

Marcel Cas (born 30 April 1972) is a Dutch former professional footballer and current fitness coach for Eredivise side Feyenoord.

As a player, he was a midfielder from 1995 until 2005, playing in both his native land and in England, notably for RBC, Notts County and FC Den Bosch, as well as also turning out in brief spells with Sheffield United and Grimsby Town.

== Playing career ==
Born in Breda in 1972, Cas started his career playing for RBC Roosendaal in 1995, quickly established himself into the team making 121 first team appearances, scoring 13 goals before securing a move to England in 2001. Cas joined Football League Second Division side Notts County in the summer of 2001. He remained at Meadow Lane until 2003, following 58 appearances and 8 goals.

Sheffield United signed Cas in 2003, but found it hard to find his way into the plans of manager Neil Warnock and he was released at the end of the 2002–2003 season, following only 6 league appearances. Cas returned to the Netherlands for preseason training, but began to talk to several clubs back in England, and this was eventually confirmed when it was announced that he had flown into Humberside Airport in June 2003 to sign a one-year contract with Grimsby Town, where he joined Tony Crane as the club's first new signings for the 2003–2004 season. Despite being signed as a right-sided midfielder, a position he had played in all his career, he would eventually come to a disagreement with manager Paul Groves who preferred to play him at right-back, whilst Jason Crowe, a natural of that position, was played in Cas's favoured slot. This was something that unsettled Cas, who eventually fell out with Groves, thus paving the way for his departure from Blundell Park in January 2004.

Upon his departure, Cas commented "I'm a midfielder...not a defender" to the media in relation to his spat with Groves that had effectively ended his time at Grimsby. Cas re-signed for RBC Roosendaal in 2004, but in a half-year spell back at the club he was plagued with injuries. He departed in summer 2004 having only featured in 16 league matches.

Upon his departure from RBC, he signed for FC Den Bosch in 2004, but decided to retire due to a persistent back injury in November 2005, following 11 years as an active professional footballer.

== Coaching career ==
At the beginning of the season 2009/2010 season, Dutch side Feyenoord announced that Cas had joined the club's backroom staff, working in the medical department after spending two years as a fitness coach at RKC. In 2013, he became the clubs fitness coach.
