= Robbie Busscher =

Dutch footballer

Personal information
- Full name: Robert Busscher
- Date of birth: 23 November 1982 (age 43)
- Place of birth: Leidschendam, Netherlands
- Height: 5 ft 8 in (1.73 m)
- Position: Midfielder

Youth career
- 1998–2001: Feyenoord

Senior career*
Years	Team	Apps	(Gls)
2001–2002	Grimsby Town	1	(0)
2002	Stormvogels Telstar	0	(0)
2003	SC Feyenoord	11	(0)
2003–2004	ADO Den Haag	0	(0)
2005–2006	RBC	0	(0)

International career
1997-1998	Netherlands U16	6	(2)
1998	Netherlands U17	6	(0)
2000	Netherlands U18	2	(0)
- * Club domestic league appearances and goals

Robert "Robbie" Busscher (Dutch pronunciation: [ˈrɔbərt ˈrɔbi ˈbʏsər]; born 23 November 1982) is a Dutch former professional footballer who played as a midfielder from 2001 to 2006.

Busscher played for Grimsby Town, Stormvogels Telstar, SC Feyenoord, ADO Den Haag and RBC Roosendaal before switching sports to compete in futsal where he previously played for FC Tutor.

== Playing career ==
=== Football ===
As a youngster Busscher played for Feyenoord and appeared for the Netherlands at U16, U17 and U18 level. In 2001, he secured a move to English club Grimsby Town, joining on a free transfer along with fellow Feyenoord youngster Ronald Ermes. Busscher featured once for Grimsby, coming on as a substitute for fellow countryman Menno Willems in the 89th minute of a 1–0 victory over West Bromwich Albion at The Hawthorns.

If chances were limited under Lennie Lawrence, they were non-existent under new manager Paul Groves. Busscher and Ermes were released in January 2002. The pair returned to the Netherlands and signed with SC Feyenoord an amateur sister club connected to Feyenoord.

=== Futsal ===
Busscher now plays Futsal for FC Tutor Delft in his home country.
