= Simon Ford =

Jamaican footballer (born 1981)

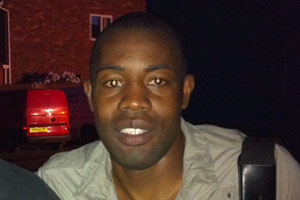

Personal information
- Full name: Simon Gary Ford
- Date of birth: 17 November 1981 (age 45)
- Place of birth: Upton Park, England
- Height: 6 ft 0 in (1.83 m)
- Position: Defender

Youth career
- ?–2001: Charlton Athletic

Senior career*
Years	Team	Apps	(Gls)
2001–2004	Grimsby Town	78	(4)
2004	Bristol Rovers	0	(0)
2004	Redbridge	1	(0)
2004–2010	Kilmarnock	144	(6)
2010–2012	Chesterfield	49	(1)
2012–2013	Grimsby Town	2	(0)
2013	→ AFC Telford United (loan)	6	(0)
Total		280	(11)

International career
2008–2009	Jamaica	3	(0)
- * Club domestic league appearances and goals

Simon Gary Ford (born 17 November 1981) is a former professional footballer who played as a defender from 2001 to 2013.

Having started his career with Charlton Athletic as a youngster, he transferred to Grimsby Town in 2001. He moved on to Bristol Rovers and Redbridge before establishing himself with Scottish Premier League side Kilmarnock where he remained for six years. He moved to Chesterfield in 2010 and was released after two seasons. He returned to Grimsby Town in the summer of 2012 but only made two appearances and was loaned out for a spell at AFC Telford United. He has also been capped three times by Jamaica.

== Club career ==
=== Charlton Athletic ===
Ford began his career at Charlton Athletic under Alan Curbishley and was promoted to the club's first-team squad in the 2000–01 season. But he found his first-team chances at The Valley halted and he was released from the London club in summer 2001 having never played a first-team match for the club.

=== Grimsby Town ===
After leaving Charlton in 2001, he signed for Lennie Lawrence's Grimsby Town before the start of the 2001–02 season. Ford made his professional debut on 21 August 2001 during a 2–1 victory over local rivals Lincoln City in the first round of the Football League Cup, coming on as a 79th-minute substitute for Ben Chapman. On 22 December 2001, he made his league debut in the club's Division One 0–0 away draw with Preston North End where he played from the start. The following week on 29 December 2001 Ford scored his 1st goal for Grimsby with a header to give them a 2–1 lead against Portsmouth, after Peter Crouch had put Pompey 1–0 up with the game eventually finishing a 3–1 victory to the Mariners. Ford would go on to make 16 appearances in all competitions during his first season at Blundell Park.

During the 2002–03 season Ford was favoured by new manager Paul Groves and took his chance in the first team when injury had sidelined new signing Steve Chettle earlier that season. Ford, who regularly partnered Georges Santos at the back, would go on to make 40 appearances that season. Despite Ford's surge into the first team the club were relegated but his consistent performances had drawn some interest from fellow Division One sides Bradford City and Wolverhampton Wanderers. But no transfer ever materialised. During the 2003–04 season Ford fell out of contention within the club to the preferred pairing of Tony Crane and Mike Edwards.

Despite being a valued player only a year before, Ford's contract was not renewed when it expired in summer 2004 and he departed Grimsby in August 2004. He made 84 appearances in all competitions for the club and scored four goals.

=== Bristol Rovers and Redbridge ===
Ford quickly joined Bristol Rovers on a non-contract basis before the start of the 2004–05 season, but manager Ian Atkins allowed him to leave the club without playing a game only a couple of weeks into his stay.

Shortly after his brief stint in Bristol, Ford signed professional terms for Conference South side Redbridge who were placed three levels below the last league he played in for Grimsby. Ford played in only one match for the club before he was approached by Scottish Premier League side Kilmarnock who were naturally given permission by Redbridge to talk to the player.

=== Kilmarnock ===
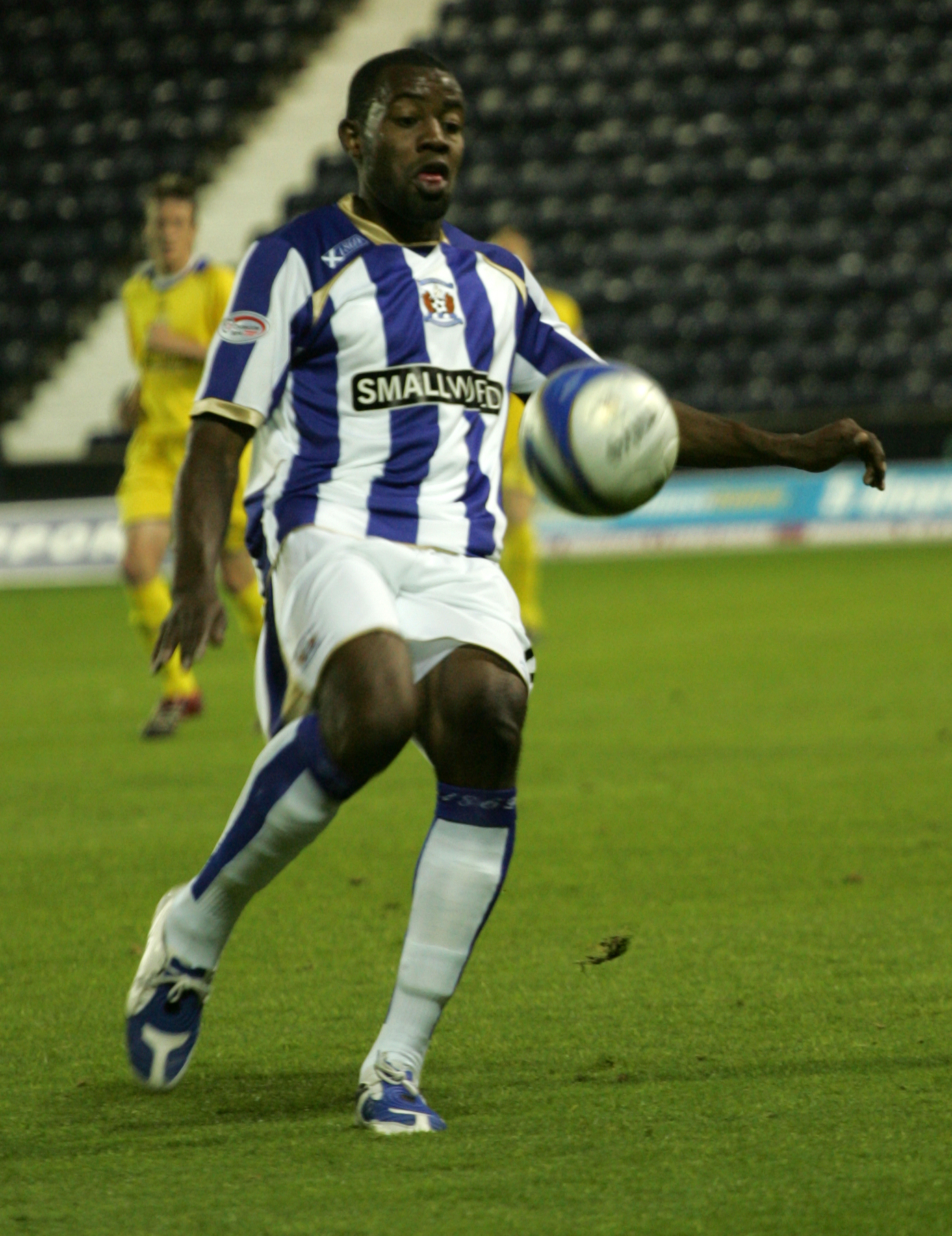
Ford at Kilmarnock.

He had to initially sign for Kilmarnock as an amateur because he had signed professionally for Redbridge shortly beforehand. Ford was paid for commercial and marketing work while playing as an amateur. On 27 December 2004 Ford scored in the 3–1 victory against Dundee on 38 minutes, a left-wing free-kick from Garry Hay found Ford unmarked, he rose to power home his first goal for the club. He then signed as a professional in January 2005.

He had been a regular since arriving in October 2004, but in March 2005 it was stated he had to undergo a double hernia operation, that will rule him out until the following season.

On 15 October 2005 he scored the opening goal on 7 minutes in the 4–2 defeat at Hibernian, after Gordon Greer flicked the ball to Ford, goalkeeper Zbigniew Malkowski had little chance as the header went in from close range. After missing the following two games through injury, on 29 October 2005 he made it 1–1 against Aberdeen when Kris Boyd's low drive could not be held by goalkeeper Ryan Esson and Ford headed in the rebound, the game finishing 4–2 to Kilmarnock.

Ford damaged his medial ligament and cartilage in April 2006 and faced over four months on the sidelines, assistant manager Billy Brown said "It's a major blow for the lad and club. He's been terrific." He was due to have a hip operation in the summer but had to wait until the knee had begun to heal. He eventually returned in October 2006.

Ford went on to make 144 league appearances in a six-year stay with Killie, where he scored six times.

=== Chesterfield ===
Ford signed for Chesterfield under freedom of contract in June 2010 and to replace the recently departed Kevin Austin, in defence, who was released by Chesterfield. On 21 August 2010 he scored the 4th goal on 62 minutes in the 4–0 thrashing of Hereford United, Danny Whitaker whipped in a corner and picked out Ford and the defender powered a header into the net.

Ford was part of the 2011–12 side that beat Swindon Town 2–0 in the Football League Trophy final on 25 March 2012, he hit the crossbar on 8 minutes with striker Jack Lester hitting in the rebound, only to be ruled out for offside.

He was released by the club at the end of the 2011–12 season.

=== Return to Grimsby Town ===
10 seasons on since Grimsby and Ford suffered relegation from what is now the Football League Championship, Ford returned to Grimsby Town on 28 July 2012 on a trial basis and played in the club's pre-season friendly against Barton Town Old Boys. Three days later he signed a one-year contract. Despite dropping out of the professional game for the first time in his career, Ford struggled to hold down a place back at Blundell Park. On 27 February 2013, after failing to make a single appearance all season and failing to dislodge the likes of Shaun Pearson, Ian Miller and Nathan Pond from the first team, Ford was loaned out to fellow Conference side AFC Telford United until the end of the 2012–13 season.

Ford was recalled to Grimsby on 10 April 2013 after injuries to both Shaun Pearson and Ian Miller. He played 6 times for Telford with the club also being relegated from the Conference National during that time. Ford made his second debut for The Mariners in the club's 1–1 draw at Luton Town on 12 April 2013. Ford played one more game for the club but wasn't used in Town's unsuccessful play-off campaign. He was released on 2 May 2013.

== International career ==
Ford has represented Jamaica three times against Trinidad and Tobago, St Vincent and Grenada.

== Personal life ==
He is former Rangers and Liverpool winger Mark Walters's nephew.

== Honours ==
Chesterfield

- Football League Two: 2010–11
- Football League Trophy: 2011–12

Individual

- Grimsby Town Supporters' Young Player of the Year: 2001–02
