= Jonathan Rowan =

English footballer (born 1981)

Personal information
- Full name: Jonathan Robert Rowan
- Date of birth: 29 November 1981 (age 44)
- Place of birth: Grimsby, England
- Height: 5 ft 10 in (1.78 m)
- Position: Striker

Youth career
- 1997–2000: Grimsby Town

Senior career*
Years	Team	Apps	(Gls)
2000–2004	Grimsby Town	52	(6)
2004	Kidderminster Harriers	0	(0)
2004	Kettering Town		
2004–2005	Gainsborough Trinity		
2005	Ossett Town		
2005–2007	Boston Town	70	(31)
2007–2009	Boston United	68	(17)
2009–2010	Boston Town		
- * Club domestic league appearances and goals

Jonathan Robert Rowan (born 29 November 1981) is an English former professional footballer who played as a forward from 2000 to 2010.

He started his professional career with Grimsby Town in the Football League, playing three years inside the second tier of English football and a further year in the third, the latter years of his Grimsby career were hit by a number of injuries which led to his departure in 2004. He briefly moved to Kidderminster Harriers before going on to join Kettering Town and Gainsborough Trinity. In 2006, he signed for Boston Town where his goal scoring rate earned him a move across town to Boston United. Rowan spent two seasons with United before returning to Boston Town in 2009. He retired from playing competitive football at the end of the 2009–10 season to concentrate on coaching within the sport.

He currently runs his own sports development firm called JR Sports which specialises in working with schools to improve sports access for children

== Playing career ==
=== Grimsby Town ===
Rowan was added to the Mariners squad in the summer of 2000 by manager Alan Buckley, however following Buckley's dismissal it would be his replacement Lennie Lawrence that handed Rowan his debut. He made that debut on 26 September 2000 when he came on as a 76th minute replacement for Daryl Clare in a League Cup 2nd round 1st leg match with Wolverhampton Wanderers and with what was his first touch of the ball he hit in Grimsby's third goal of the night which turned out to be the winning goal in a 3–2 win for The Mariners. Rowan featured in a further seven matches during the 2000–2001 season. Over the off-season following a pre-season tour of Scandinavia several injuries to other forwards had earned him the opportunity to start the 2001–02 season as a first team regular and he quickly formed a partnership with Phil Jevons that saw the club rise briefly to the top of the First Division. Rowan started the 2–1 League Cup victory away at Liverpool before being replaced by Michael Boulding in the 81st minute. However following injury problems, Rowan found himself mainly side lined for the next couple of seasons, and played a considerable amount less. This eventually led to his exit from Blundell Park following the conclusion of the 2003–2004 season. Whilst with Grimsby Rowan was considered capable of playing at the highest level, but ongoing injury problems at a relatively young age meant his time with the Mariners represented the peak of his footballing career.

=== Kidderminster Harriers ===
After leaving Grimsby he made a move to Football League Two side Kidderminster Harriers during the 2004–2005 season, however it was only for a brief spell where he signed on a non-contract basis. After making not one single appearance for the club, he was released in January 2005.

=== Non-league ===
Rowan joined Conference North side Kettering Town along with fellow former Grimsby teammate Steve Croudson. After playing in only a handful of games for the club who were briefly managed by Paul Gascoigne he moved on again.

Rowan signed for fellow Conference North side Gainsborough Trinity during the 2005–2006 season however he initially struggled too break into the first team at Trinity and found himself playing second fiddle to other strikers at the club. He briefly left Gainsborough for a month, but returned and won his place back in the team and create a brief striking partnership with Dave Reeves and Clint Marcelle.

After a brief spell with Ossett Town in 2005, he joined Boston Town of the United Counties Football League.

In the summer of 2007 he transferred to cross town neighbours Boston United. The club had just suffered relegation from the Football League but due to financial irregularities at York Street the club were also demoted from the Conference National a few weeks later and had to start the 2007–2008 season playing in the Conference North. In his first season with United his performances earned him being voted the Player of the Season.

Despite United finishing mid table more off the field complications saw the club demoted for a second time this time into the Northern Premier League. By the end of the 2008–2009 season The Pilgriims had failed to win promotion and the manager along with most of the playing squad departed that summer.

Rowan returned to part-timers Boston Town for the 2009–2010 season. whilst also being contracted to former club Grimsby Town as a Community Coach, at the end of the season Rowan left Boston Town for a second time and opted to end his playing career.

== Coaching career ==
During the 2009–2010 season Rowan was appointed part-time Community Coach at former club Grimsby Town, he mixed his duties with playing as a semi-professional for Boston Town. Rowan was initially relieved of his duties in the summer of 2010 with the club only retaining former manager Graham Rodger as a Community coach, but this was short lived and he returned soon after on a part-time basis. In October 2010 Rowan launched his own sports business called JR Sports who work with schools to improve sport for their pupils.

== Honours ==
=== Boston United ===
- Supporters Player of the Year: 2008

=== Grimsby Town ===
- Supporters Young Player of the Year: 2001
