= Iain Ward =

English football player and coach

Personal information
- Full name: Iain Campbell Ward
- Date of birth: 13 May 1983 (age 43)
- Place of birth: Cleethorpes, England
- Position: Defender

Team information
- Current team: Grimsby Town (Youth Team Coach)

Youth career
- 1999–2001: Grimsby Town

Senior career*
| Years | Team | Apps | (Gls) |
| 2001–2004 | Grimsby Town | 12 | (0) |
| 2004–2008 | Brigg Town | | |

Managerial career
- 2016–: Grimsby Town (U12's)
- * Club domestic league appearances and goals

Iain Campbell Ward (born 13 May 1983) is an English former professional footballer and youth team coach of League Two side Grimsby Town.

As a player, he was defender, primarily a right back. He played in the Football League for Grimsby Town before going on to play for Non- League side Brigg Town.

== Career ==
Ward was born in Cleethorpes, Lincolnshire. He joined the youth system at Grimsby Town at the age of 12, and worked his way through to the first-team squad by Lennie Lawrence towards the close of the 2000–01 season. He made his debut a year later, in the last Division One match of the season, a 3–1 defeat away to Millwall on 21 April 2002.

He was given a 12-month contract in June 2002, and went on to feature 14 times for The Mariners in all competitions before being released at the end of the 2003–04 campaign. When he received no offers from League clubs, he decided to start a degree course in Grimsby, and signed for nearby Brigg Town, newly promoted to the Northern Premier League First Division, on a semi-professional basis. Ward left Brigg Town after four years with the club at the end of the 2007–08 season.

== Personal life ==
Ward's younger brother Andrew also played for Grimsby Town's junior teams.
