= Isaiah Rankin =

English footballer (born 1978)

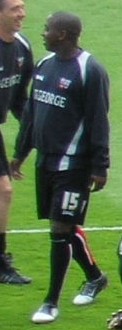
- Rankin warming up for Brentford in 2006

Personal information
- Full name: Isaiah Marcus Rankin
- Date of birth: 22 May 1978 (age 48)
- Place of birth: Edmonton, England
- Height: 1.78 m (5 ft 10 in)
- Positions: Forward; winger

Youth career
- 1994–1996: Arsenal

Senior career*
Years	Team	Apps	(Gls)
1996–1998	Arsenal	1	(0)
1997	→ Colchester United (loan)	11	(5)
1998–2001	Bradford City	37	(4)
2000	→ Birmingham City (loan)	13	(4)
2000	→ Bolton Wanderers (loan)	16	(2)
2001–2004	Barnsley	46	(8)
2004	→ Grimsby Town (loan)	6	(2)
2004	Grimsby Town	6	(2)
2004–2006	Brentford	78	(15)
2006–2008	Grimsby Town	37	(2)
2007	→ Macclesfield Town (loan)	4	(0)
2008	Stevenage Borough	6	(0)
2008–2009	Crawley Town	18	(3)
2009–2010	Forest Green Rovers	19	(3)
2010–2011	Ashford Town	35	(12)
2011–2014	Hendon	61	(14)
Total		394	(76)
- * Club domestic league appearances and goals

Isaiah Marcus Rankin (born 22 May 1978) is an English former professional footballer who played as a forward from 1996 to 2014.

He started his professional career with Arsenal where he came through the club's youth setup. He appeared once for the Gunners, was loaned out to Colchester United, then sold to Bradford City in 1998 where he was part of the squad that gained promotion to the Premier League. Bradford loaned him to Bolton Wanderers, then Birmingham City, before moving him to Barnsley on a permanent deal in 2001. In 2004, he joined Grimsby Town and then Brentford where he remained for two years before returning to Grimsby. During his second spell with The Mariners he spent a month on loan with Macclesfield Town before being released. He then joined Stevenage Borough for the remainder of the 2007–08 season. He subsequently played non-league football for Crawley Town, Forest Green Rovers, Ashford Town and Hendon.

== Career ==
=== Arsenal ===
Rankin started his career playing for Arsenal as a youngster, and he was promoted to the first team squad in the summer of 1996. Rankin went on to feature once for The Gunners, coming on as a late substitute in a 1–1 draw with rivals Tottenham Hotspur in December 1997. Arsenal went on to win the Premier League that season but Rankin didn't feature enough times (once) for a medal. While with the club he had a brief loan spell with Colchester United. In 1998, he was transfer listed by the club, and shortly afterwards he was to leave Highbury with Yorkshire his destination. Manager Arsène Wenger said he sold Rankin "Because he had in front of him too many players who were in to play in the top team. He was impatient. I thought that he wouldn't naturally make it this season, and he needed some first-team games. He was one of the players where, if you keep him, he drops; if he drops, his value goes down and he isn't happy and he hasn't improved. If you are sure he won't play for you this season, you give him a chance to make a career somewhere else. I'm happy for him." He was featured in a YouTube video of Arsenal's channel for guessing the former Arsenal player.

=== Bradford City ===
Rankin was signed by Bradford City for £1.3 million helping them earn promotion to the Premier League in his first season. Rankin was not considered a first team regular during Bradford's two-year stay in the top flight and featured in only ten of their Premiership matches during that time. However, he was on the pitch when Bradford memorably secured safety on the last day of the 1999–2000 season with a win against Liverpool. Rankin was loaned out twice by Bradford, firstly to Birmingham City and then Bolton Wanderers, before finally leaving the club permanently to join Yorkshire rivals Barnsley.

=== Barnsley ===
Rankin joined Barnsley for £350,000 on 19 January 2001, and would go on to play in three different seasons for the Oakwell club. During the 2003–04 season, with Barnsley rooted in the middle of the Division Two table, he was made available for transfer after losing his place in the team. Barnsley attempted to sign Grimsby Town striker Michael Boulding, who had wanted to leave the club following the dismissal of Town's manager Paul Groves. Barnsley offered Town £50,000 for Boulding with the option of taking Rankin on a one-month loan as part of the deal. The offer was accepted by caretaker manager Graham Rodger and Rankin signed for The Mariners initially for a one-month loan period.

=== Grimsby Town ===
Rankin scored two goals in his first six games. In a match against his parent club Barnsley at Blundell Park, Rankin scored a goal in a 6–1 victory for Grimsby, but controversially upset Barnsley manager Gudjon Thordarson for what he called an unprofessional goal celebration. Thordarson stated that Rankin would never play for Barnsley again, and the player had his contract terminated with immediate effect, which allowed him to sign for Grimsby on a permanent basis until the end of the season. Grimsby appointed Nicky Law as manager but he could not prevent the club's relegation, despite Rankin's goal in a 1–0 win against Brentford on the second-last game of the season. Following the club's relegation, Rankin was out of contract and decided not to stay at Blundell Park in favour to stay playing his football in League One.

=== Brentford ===
Brentford came in for the striker, and signed him on a two-year deal. Rankin joined the club along with fellow Grimsby player Jamie Lawrence. During his spell at the Griffin Park club, his goal against Southampton in the 2004–05 FA Cup Fifth Round was nominated on Match of the Day's 'Goal of the Month' competition, but did not win the top prize. Rankin was released by Brentford in May 2006 after two years.

=== Return to Grimsby Town ===
Rankin re-joined Grimsby Town in July 2006 but despite much expectations, he made a slow start to the new spell, despite scoring on his second debut in the 3–2 win over Boston United, a game in which he and Peter Bore helped Grimsby come back from 2–0 down. With favoured goalscoring partner Michael Reddy injured, Rankin struggled with fitness problems and by the end of the season the pair had only scored three goals between them. Rodger was sacked as manager and Alan Buckley came in to take his place. With the loan signing of Martin Paterson a favoured starter it meant when fit Rankin would often have to settle for a place on the bench. Buckley made Rankin available for loan and in March 2007 he was loaned out to Macclesfield Town for the remainder of the season. He made only four appearances and failed to score. Rankin remained at Blundell Park for the beginning of the 2007–08 season but his contract was eventually terminated by mutual consent during the January 2008 transfer window.

=== Stevenage Borough ===
Upon his release from Grimsby, he signed with Conference club Stevenage Borough on a short-term deal until the end of the 2007–08 season. He was one of several players released at the end of the season.

=== Crawley Town ===
His next club was Crawley Town, with whom he signed in July 2008 having featured in a number of pre-season friendlies whilst on trial with the West Sussex club. In January 2009, Crawley were deducted four league points and fined after failing to register Rankin with the Conference at the start of the 2008–09 campaign, despite the fact that the Football Association received his papers. Following the conclusion of the season, Crawley decided against offering Rankin a new deal, and he was released from the club. Rankin made 18 league appearances for Crawley, scoring three times.

=== Forest Green Rovers ===
Following his release from Crawley, Rankin remained out of the game up until December 2009, when he signed for fellow Conference National team Forest Green Rovers on a non-contract basis. He was given the number 33 shirt. Rankin scored his first goal for the club in a 3–1 Boxing Day victory over Salisbury City, and his second in a 1–0 win over Gateshead at the New Lawn on 16 January 2010. He netted Forest Green's only goal in their 2–1 loss to Notts County at Meadow Lane in the third round of the FA Cup. He was released at the end of the season having scored three goals in 19 league appearances.

=== Ashford Town ===
In September 2010, Rankin signed for Southern Football League Division One Central side Ashford Town, in Middlesex, a team managed by his former Bradford City, Grimsby Town and Brentford teammate Jamie Lawrence.

=== Hendon ===
Rankin joined Isthmian League Premier Division side Hendon on 16 August 2011. In July 2012, he signed a new one-year contract. Rankin made 76 appearances and scored 15 goals before departing at the end of the 2013–14 season and subsequently retired from competitive football.

== Career statistics ==
Appearances and goals by club, season and competition
Club	Season	League			FA Cup		League Cup		Europe		Other		Total	
Club	Season	Division	Apps	Goals	Apps	Goals	Apps	Goals	Apps	Goals	Apps	Goals	Apps	Goals
Arsenal	1997–98	Premier League	1	0	0	0	0	0	0	0	―		1	0
Colchester United (loan)	1997–98	Third Division	11	5	0	0	―		―		1 (Note: Appearances in Football League Trophy)	0	12	5
Bradford City	1998–99	First Division	27	4	1	0	2	1	―		―		30	5
Bradford City	1999–2000	Premier League	9	0	1	0	0	0	―		―		10	0
Bradford City	2000–01	Premier League	1	0	0	0	0	0	2 (Note: Appearances in UEFA Intertoto Cup)	0	―		3	0
Bradford City	Total		37	4	2	0	2	1	2	0	―		43	5
Birmingham City (loan)	1999–2000	First Division	13	4	―		―		―		―		13	4
Bolton Wanderers (loan)	2000–01	First Division	16	2	―		2	0	―		―		18	2
Barnsley	2000–01	First Division	9	1	―		―		―		―		9	1
Barnsley	2001–02	First Division	9	1	0	0	1	0	―		―		10	1
Barnsley	2002–03	Second Division	8	1	0	0	1	1	―		0	0	9	2
Barnsley	2003–04	Second Division	20	5	3	1	1	1	―		2	0	26	7
Barnsley	Total		46	8	3	1	3	2	―		2	0	54	11
Grimsby Town	2003–04	Second Division	12	4	―		―		―		―		12	4
Brentford	2004–05	League One	41	8	9	2	1	0	―		2 (Note: Appearances in Football League play-offs)	0	53	10
Brentford	2005–06	League One	37	7	5	2	0	0	―		2	0	44	9
Brentford	Total		78	15	14	4	1	0	―		4	0	97	19
Grimsby Town	2006–07	League Two	20	2	1	0	1	0	―		1	0	23	2
Grimsby Town	2007–08	League Two	17	0	0	0	1	0	―		1	1	19	1
Grimsby Town	Total		49	6	1	0	2	0	―		2	1	54	7
Macclesfield Town (loan)	2006–07	League Two	4	0	―		―		―		―		4	0
Stevenage Borough	2007–08	Conference National	6	0	0	0	―		―		0	0	6	0
Crawley Town	2008–09	Conference National	18	3	0	0	―		―		0	0	18	3
Forest Green Rovers	2009–10	Conference National	19	3	1	1	―		―		0	0	20	4
Hendon	2011–12	Isthmian League Premier Division	32	12	1	0	―		―		7 (Note: 3 appearances in London Senior Cup, 2 appearances in Middlesex Senior Cup, 1 appearance in FA Trophy, 1 appearance in Isthmian League Cup)	0	40	12
Hendon	2012–13	Isthmian League Premier Division	25	2	4	0	―		―		3 (Note: 1 appearance in FA Trophy, 1 appearance in Middlesex Senior Cup, 1 appearance in London Senior Cup)	0	32	3
Hendon	2013–14	Isthmian League Premier Division	4	0	0	0	―		―		0	0	4	0
Hendon	Total		61	14	5	0	―		―		10	0	76	15
Career total			359	64	26	6	10	3	2	0	19	1	376	75

== Honours ==
Arsenal

- FA Youth Cup: 1993–94

Bradford City

- Football League First Division second-place promotion: 1998–99
