= Andy Love (English footballer) =

English footballer

Personal information
- Date of birth: 28 March 1979 (age 47)
- Place of birth: Grimsby, England
- Height: 6 ft 2 in (1.88 m)
- Position: Goalkeeper

Youth career
- 1993–1996: Grimsby Town

Senior career*
Years	Team	Apps	(Gls)
1996–2000	Grimsby Town	12	(0)
1999	→ Ilkeston Town (loan)		
2000	→ Ilkeston Town (loan)		
2000–2002	Ilkeston Town		
2003	Ilkeston Town		
- * Club domestic league appearances and goals

Andrew Love (born 28 March 1979) is an English former professional footballer who played in the Football League as a goalkeeper for Grimsby Town.

== Career ==
=== Grimsby Town ===
Love was born in Grimsby, Lincolnshire, and began his football career as a trainee at hometown club Grimsby Town in 1995. Initially third-choice goalkeeper behind Paul Crichton and Jason Pearcey, he made his debut in Grimsby's 2–1 league defeat against Birmingham City on 1 March 1997. Crichton left Grimsby for West Bromwich Albion in 1997, but Love dropped down the pecking order again on the arrival of Aidan Davison. He joined Southern League club Ilkeston Town on loan during the 1998–99 season, and on his return had a brief run in Grimsby's first team. Finding himself again third choice, this time behind newcomer Danny Coyne and youngster Steve Croudson, he returned to Ilkeston on loan.

=== Ilkeston Town ===
Having spent time on loan to Ilkeston Town, he was released in 2000 and signed for the Southern League club on a permanent deal. He left Ilkeston at the end of the 2001–02 season, returned the following season, but was released from his contract at his own request in October 2003.
