= Jason Crowe =

English footballer (born 1978)

Personal information
- Full name: Jason William Robert Crowe
- Date of birth: 30 September 1978 (age 48)
- Place of birth: Sidcup, London, England
- Height: 5 ft 9 in (1.75 m)
- Position: Right-back

Youth career
- 1994–1996: Arsenal

Senior career*
Years	Team	Apps	(Gls)
1996–1999	Arsenal	0	(0)
1998–1999	→ Crystal Palace (loan)	8	(0)
1999–2003	Portsmouth	86	(5)
2000	→ Brentford (loan)	9	(0)
2003–2005	Grimsby Town	69	(4)
2005–2009	Northampton Town	171	(14)
2009–2011	Leeds United	17	(0)
2011	Leyton Orient	12	(0)
2011–2012	Northampton Town	11	(0)
2012–2013	Corby Town	29	(1)
Total		412	(24)

International career
1997	England U20	3	(0)
- * Club domestic league appearances and goals

Jason William Robert Crowe (born 30 September 1978) is an English former professional footballer who played as a right-back, and midfielder from 1996 to 2013.

Crowe a former England Under-20 international started his career at Arsenal as a junior and was handed a professional contract at the beginning of the 1996–97 season. He only played a few matches for The Gunners. He later went on to join Crystal Palace on loan before signing permanently with Portsmouth in 1999. He spent time on loan with Brentford in 2000 before helping secure Premier League promotion for Pompey in 2003. He was sold to Grimsby Town shortly afterwards and he spent two seasons there before moving on to Northampton Town in 2005. Four years later he secured a move to Leeds United before going on to Leyton Orient, then back to Northampton Town. In the summer of 2012 he dropped out of the Football League for the first time by signing with Conference North club Corby Town.

== Club career ==
=== Arsenal ===
Crowe started his career as a trainee at Arsenal, although he was unable to break into the first team, with veteran right back Lee Dixon usually occupying the slot. He made his debut as substitute in a League Cup tie against Birmingham City on 14 October 1997 but was sent off after just 33 seconds by referee Uriah Rennie for a foul on Martin O'Connor. It was the fastest debut sending-off in English football history. That season he also contributed to Arsenal's run in the FA Cup, coming on as a substitute against Crystal Palace in the fifth round. However, he wasn't part of the squad when they won the 1998 FA Cup Final. He played one more match for Arsenal (in the League Cup against Derby County). After a loan spell at Crystal Palace he moved to Portsmouth in July 1999, with Arsène Wenger deeming him surplus to requirements.

=== Portsmouth ===
After joining Portsmouth for a fee of £1,000,000, Crowe played 29 games during his first season at the club before being transfer-listed by Tony Pulis at the start of the 2000–01 season. Crowe joined Brentford on loan, and played 9 League games for the Bees before returning to Portsmouth where he made a further 24 appearances. During his third season with Portsmouth, Crowe made 23 appearances and scored his first goal for the club during a 2–2 draw with Wolves at Molineux. In his final season at Portsmouth, Crowe played in 17 games and scored 4 goals for the club. Two of these goals came in a memorable game against former club Crystal Palace; Crowe came on as a substitute at half time with his side trailing 2–0, but he scored twice to help them win 3–2. After winning promotion to the Premier League, Crowe was one of five players to be released by Portsmouth manager Harry Redknapp.

=== Grimsby Town ===
After his release by Portsmouth, Crowe joined relegated team Grimsby Town, on a two-year contract. The Mariners had suffered relegation from the First Division in the previous season, whilst Crowe, was a part of the Portsmouth squad who had earned promotion from the same league. Signed by Paul Groves, Crowe was one of the first of the new arrivals at Blundell Park during the 2003–04 season campaign, he was often deployed on the right side of defence and midfield, competing with John McDermott and Marcel Cas. Grimsby would go on to suffer a second successive relegation having fallen into the drop zone on the final day of the season. Crowe's first season at the club would see him make 36 appearances. During his second season with Grimsby, Crowe played in 40 games and scored 4 goals. With his contract exprining in the summer of 2004, Crowe was offered a new deal by Grimsby but also wanted to listen to other contract offers. Crowe eventually agreed a contract at Northampton Town.

=== Northampton Town ===
Crowe initially signed a two-year contract with the Cobblers and won promotion during his first season at the club in which he made 46 appearances and scored 2 goals. Crowe signed a two-year extension to his contract during June 2007. Crowe was appointed Northampton captain, and during the 2008–9 season he scored 3 goals; although not in the same game, against his soon to be next employers Leeds United. Crowe was offered another new contract with Northampton after the club were relegated to League Two on the final day of the 2008–09 season following a 3–0 defeat to Leeds United.

=== Leeds United ===
On 16 June 2009, it was announced that Crowe had rejected the new contract offer at Northampton before agreeing a contract at League One side Leeds United, beginning on 1 July 2009.

He made his first team debut for Leeds in the first game of the season win against Exeter City. Crowe played his part in the defence that saw 8 wins from 9 games at the start of the season 2009–10.

Crowe suffered hamstring damage in the game v MK Dons and had to be substituted early on. Crowe missed his first Leeds United game after his hamstring injury ruled him out of the game against Carlisle United which subsequently kept Crowe out for a number of weeks. On 25 November 2009, Crowe returned from injury and played in Leeds' reserve game against Lincoln, starting the game in an unusual central midfield position to help boost his match fitness. Crowe started the FA Cup game against Kettering Town and kept his place in the side against Oldham Athletic. Crowe then started against Huddersfield Town but when Richard Naylor and Patrick Kisnorbo both returned from injury Leigh Bromby was moved back to right back and Crowe dropped back to the bench.

After Leigh Bromby picked up a suspension for 5 yellow cards, Crowe returned to the Leeds starting line-up for the FA Cup game against Manchester United. Crowe put in an heroic performance against Manchester United when Leeds won 1–0 at Old Trafford on 3 January. Crowe also provided a vital goal-line clearance after Wayne Rooney's shot was saved by Casper Ankergren but was heading into the back of the net. Crowe was able to slice it away. Crowe kept his place in the team for the following game, against Wycombe Wanderers with Leigh Bromby taking a spot on the bench.

Crowe scored his first goal for Leeds in the Football League Trophy Northern Final first leg against Carlisle United. Crowe kept his place in the side for Leeds and played in the 2–2 draw against Tottenham Hotspur on 23 January 2010. After a poor performance against Swindon Town, Crowe was omitted from the starting line-up against Colchester United. Crowe came on as a late substitute for Leeds in the replay against Tottenham Hotspur.

Crowe came back into the starting line-up for Leeds' JPT second leg game against Carlisle United. He scored his second goal of the season for Leeds in the 3–2 win after a fine right footed volley, but Leeds ended up crashing out of the tournament after losing on penalties.

Crowe's season was ended prematurely after having an operation on his ankle in April. During his time out injured, Leeds earned promotion to the Championship. He returned the following season, but lost his number 2 shirt to new signing Paul Connolly and was instead given the number 20 shirt.

On 10 December 2010, manager Simon Grayson confirmed that Crowe was not in his first team plans and he revealed that Crowe had turned down moves to leave the club on loan.

=== Leyton Orient and return to Northampton ===
In January 2011 Crowe was put on the transfer list, and he signed for Leyton Orient on 31 January 2011 after his contract was cancelled by mutual consent. He left Orient at the end of the 2010–11 season.

On 12 November 2011, Crowe re-signed for the Cobblers and made his second debut, against Luton Town in the FA Cup 1st round on the same day. He was released by Northampton at the end of the 2011–12 season along with eight other first team players.

=== Corby Town ===
Crowe moved to Conference North side Corby Town in July 2012 alongside fellow former Northampton players Andy Holt and Leon McKenzie. Corby suffered relegation to the Northern Premier League in May 2013, and shortly afterwards Crowe departed.

== International career ==
In 1997 Crowe gained 3 caps for England Under 20s.

== Honours ==
Portsmouth

- Football League First Division: 2002–03
