= Tony Crane (footballer) =

English footballer

Personal information
- Full name: Anthony Steven Crane
- Date of birth: 8 September 1982 (age 44)
- Place of birth: Liverpool, England
- Position: Defender

Youth career
- 1997–1999: Sheffield Wednesday

Senior career*
| Years | Team | Apps | (Gls) |
| 1999–2003 | Sheffield Wednesday | 48 | (4) |
| 2003–2006 | Grimsby Town | 45 | (4) |
| 2005 | → Worksop Town (loan) | | |
| 2006–2007 | Worksop Town | | |
| 2007–2008 | Boston United | 34 | (5) |
| 2009 | Hallam | | |
- * Club domestic league appearances and goals

Anthony Steven Crane (born 8 September 1982) is an English former professional footballer who played as a defender, midfielder and makeshift centre forward from 1999 to 2009.

He notably played as a professional for Sheffield Wednesday and Grimsby Town where he spent numerous seasons playing in the second and third tier of English football. He left Grimsby in 2006 and dropped into playing Non-league football with Worksop Town and later Boston United before quitting football in 2008 for personal reasons one of which being his weight. He briefly returned to play for Hallam in 2009, but left after a couple of months.

He now resides back in Sheffield and plays amateur football in the city's Saturday and Sunday leagues.

== Playing career ==
=== Sheffield Wednesday ===
Crane started his career with Sheffield Wednesday in 1999, and was promoted from the club's youth academy into the squad that summer. The 1999–2000 campaign would spell the end of Wednesday's stay in the Premier League, as well as this, Crane failed to make an appearance in England's top division for The Owls. In the next couple of seasons, Crane established himself as a first team player, and played apart in the club's next three seasons, which were all contested playing in the English First Division. Crane would be used in three positions for the Wednesday. His original position of playing as a defensive central midfield, was often mixed with using him as a centre back, and in some circumstances his height and frame were used as an advantage when his manager picked him as a makeshift centre forward. In the 2002–2003 season, Sheffield Wednesday were relegated from the First Division, along with Brighton & Hove Albion and Grimsby Town. Following the club's further demise down the English domestic football ladder, Crane decided to leave Hillsborough at the end of the season, and moved to sign for Grimsby on a free transfer, he would become the first new signing for manager Paul Groves for the 2003–04 season. after both clubs had been relegated in the previous season.

=== Grimsby Town ===
After playing the majority of his football in midfield and attack with Wednesday, Tony found himself installed as one of Grimsby's first choice centre backs although though he was initially unveiled as a midfielder when he signed for the club. He featured alongside Mike Edwards, Simon Ford or Player-Manager Paul Groves in the heart of the Grimsby defence during his first season with The Mariners. His career at Grimsby was dogged with controversy, despite being a fans favourite, his disciplinary record wasn't the greatest, clocking up 15 yellow cards and two red cards in his debut season. By the end of the 2003–2004 season Crane had suffered a third career relegation as Grimsby slumped into the drop zone on the last day of the season which saw them relegated for the second successive season.

During the 2004–2005 season, Crane was plagued with an injury that keep him out on the sidelines for up to 8 months. He eventually returned very late on in the season, making 3 appearances in total. Crane would not manage to reclaim his position at the back until the following season. Following some encouraging performances in the club's pre-season friendlies, Crane had cemented himself back in the team, partnering Rob Jones as the club's preferred centre backs, thus seeing club captain Justin Whittle relegated to the bench.

Crane managed to score a goal on the first day of the 2005–2006 season against Oxford United, this would be his last goal for Grimsby, after scoring three times beforehand. A slight aggravation in his old injury would eventually see Tony lose his place to Whittle in the team in September 2005, and after several months on the sidelines he had appeared to gain weight rapidly and became alarmingly unfit by the standards of a professional footballer. Crane returned from injury but found his chances of first team football to be non-existent, despite the sale of Simon Ramsden too Rochdale, Crane was constantly overlooked in the first team with manager Russell Slade preferring to name reserve Glen Downey as the defensive option on the bench. Crane was made available for loan in October with Russell Slade slamming him for his poor fitness and also his lack of enthusiasm to shed weight and in November 2005 fellow League Two side Wrexham made an approach to sign him, but this bid was rejected on the basis that Crane didn't fancy a move to Wales. Also interested were Conference North outfit Worksop Town, and shortly afterwards Crane joined the Nottinghamshire club on an initial three-month loan.

=== Worksop Town ===
Worksop had also signed Darren Mansaram on loan, a former Grimsby teammate of Crane's. With many people expecting Crane to return to Grimsby and fight for his place, he did not and he moved to Worksop on a permanent deal in January 2006 on a free transfer. Tony played out the remainder of the 2005–2006 season for the club, but soon attracted more attention from another Welsh club, with The Tigers turning down a bid for Crane from Newport County in December 2006. In May 2007, Worksop were relegated from the Conference North division; this would be Tony's third career relegation, and also meaning he had suffered relegation with every club he had played for. With finances that bad at Worksop, they had had to leave their home stadium, some of the more expensive playing staff were released to reduce costs. Crane would be one of the players who would see his Worksop career end in this fashion.

=== Boston United ===
In June 2007 he joined former Football League side Boston United on trial, along with fellow former Grimsby players Jonathan Rowan, Matthew Bloomer and Adam Buckley. A month later Crane made the move to Boston a permanent one. Tony slotted in at centre back for the club, and his never say die attitude, that made him popular at Grimsby, saw him become increasingly popular with United fans. His aerial presence had seen him score several headed goals, and Boston boss Tommy Taylor was able to mould his first team defence around Crane. Despite his performances he became increasingly over weight, even more so than when the problem occurred at Grimsby, and once again he became under fire again by his own club manager. Taylor stated that Tony would find it a huge possibility to return to the professional game. but only if he was able to knuckle down and lose the required weight he had gained. Taylor, also commented that his weight was the reason that Crane received at least a yellow card in nearly every game he played in, mentioning that he was slow on challenging and his big frame would often be used against him when in a tussle with an opponent. Crane continued to play week in week out for The Pilgrims, but continued to struggle to budge any weight, and carried on to put on more bulk as the season ran along. Following the close of the 2007–2008 season, Crane and Boston parted company. He would remain without a club for the entire 2008–2009 season and had turned down an offer to join up with Ilkeston Town to concentrate on his new-found fatherhood. In December following the sacking of Tommy Taylor, Boston's new manager Steve Welsh confirmed the club would like to resign Crane, if he was in a fit enough state to play. Crane was present in the club's league game at Frickley Athletic and commented a return to United could be on the cards. However a deal was never struck and Crane would play no part in the entire season.

=== Hallam ===
On 23 October 2009, exactly 17 months after leaving Boston, Crane returned to the sport, signing with non league side Hallam F.C., who play in the Northern Counties East Football League Premier Division. By Christmas, Crane had departed.

== Personal life ==
During Crane's time at Grimsby Town he was ousted from the first team by his manager Russell Slade for his rapidly increasing weight problems. Despite being recognised as a talismanic figurehead amongst the club's crop of players at the time his weight instantly led to his departure from professional football when he left Grimsby to join Worksop Town in 2006. Whilst with Boston United during the 2007–2008 season, writer Duncan Browne wrote "Despite having arguably the finest touch in the Blue Square North, he certainly had the largest frame (the club's XL shirt and shorts fitting him as if he was a cyclist),". "Despite becoming an instant fans' favourite, he got into several scrapes with manager Tommy Taylor, failing to show up for training and even getting busted for playing in goal for a Sheffield Sunday League side while under contract.

"Taylor once joked: 'It would help if Craney stopped turning up for training with a Big Mac' – – eventually dropping him for the final seven games of the season due to his inability to shed the weight. And with that, the player's contract expired and he decided to quit football." Despite his short stay with Hallam in 2009, Crane has since retired from the sport at the age of 27.

During the 2011/12 season Crane has made a football comeback signing for Amateur Sheffield Meadowhall League Division 2 side Hackenthorpe FC. During the 2012/13 season he was registered for Sheffield amateur side Beighton Albion. Tony now plays for Sheffield imperial league side, FDL Totley.

After stopping playing altogether, Tony now coaches grassroots football in Sheffield.
