= Steve Croudson =

English footballer

Personal information
- Full name: Steven David Croudson
- Date of birth: 24 November 1980 (age 45)
- Place of birth: Grimsby, England
- Position: Goalkeeper

Team information
- Current team: Grimsby Town (Goalkeeping Coach)

Youth career
- 1996–1998: Grimsby Town

Senior career*
Years	Team	Apps	(Gls)
1998–2003	Grimsby Town	6	(0)
2001	→ Scunthorpe United (loan)	4	(0)
2003–2004	Boston United	0	(0)
2004–2005	Stevenage Borough	1	(0)
2005	Halifax Town	0	(0)
2005–2006	Kettering Town		
2006	Bangor City		
2006	Rhyl		
2007	Cammell Laird		
2010–2013	Grimsby Town	8	(0)
Total		19	(0)
- * Club domestic league appearances and goals

Steven David Croudson (born 24 November 1980) is an English football coach and former professional footballer who is goalkeeping coach of EFL League Two side Grimsby Town.

He played as a goalkeeper initially from 1998 to 2007, but later came out of retirement between 2010 and 2013. He notably played for his hometown club Grimsby Town, returning to the club as goalkeeping coach following his retirement from playing due to injury at the age of 26 and would fill in as a back-up keeper during this tenure.

During his playing career he also played with Scunthorpe United, Boston United, Stevenage Borough, Halifax Town, Kettering Town, Bangor City, Rhyl and Cammell Laird. Since becoming a coach he has also worked for Hull City and Lincoln City.

== Playing career ==
=== Grimsby Town ===
Croudson came through the ranks at his home town club of Grimsby Town and was added to the first team squad during the 1998–1999 season as the club's third choice keeper behind Aidan Davison and Andy Love . During May 1999, injury put both Davison and Love on the sidelines and Croudson was handed his professional debut by Alan Buckley. The match was against Wolverhampton Wanderers on 4 May 1999 in the First Division. In an impressive performance, Croudson managed to pull off some fine saves and the game was drawn 0–0 with Croudson being awarded man of the match. 5 days later he played again in the club's 1–0 defeat away against Watford.

During the 1999–2000 campaign Grimsby manager Alan Buckley made Croudson his second choice keeper and this would eventually see him firmly cement his place behind Town's new number one Danny Coyne. Incidentally Croudson's step up in ranks would eventually go on to see Andy Love depart for Blundell Park for Ilkeston Town midway through the season. Croudson went on to make 5 appearances in League and Cup that season. The 2000–2001 season came round and new manager Lennie Lawrence although initially favouring Croudson as his backup keeper briefly replaced him with loanee Danish keeper Morten Hyldgaard. Croudson would play no part in that particular season.

In the 2001–2002 campaign Croudson was made available for loan and was originally a target for Buckley's new team Lincoln City, however Croudson made a move to Grimsby's local rivals Scunthorpe United who were managed by former Town boss Brian Laws. He signed for the Glanford Park club in August 2001 and after a month with The Iron where he played in 4 games he returned to Grimsby to fight for his place in the team. Grimsby however now had four keepers under contract, Coyne, Croudson and newcomers Ronald Ermes and Morgan Cranley. Croudson made 1 appearance that season, and this would be his last showing for The Mariners in his first spell with the club.

A management change at Grimsby again saw club captain Paul Groves step up to take over, and despite Croudson being the original choice for second choice keeper during the 2002–2003 season he would suffer a shoulder injury that ruled him out of the entire season, forcing Groves to sign Leeds United's Shaun Allaway on a season long loan to fill in on the bench. At the end of the season both Croudson and his goalkeeping companion Danny Coyne both left Grimsby, with Coyne joining Premier League Leicester City. Croudson played in 6 league matches for Grimsby in his five-year stay.

=== Boston United ===
Croudson would remain in the county of Lincolnshire and signed up with Third Division outfit Boston United. Steve would play second fiddle and understudy to Paul Bastock for the entire 2003–2004 season, and by the end of the season after failing to make a single appearance United boss Steve Evans deciding against extending his one-year contract and he was released. Despite holding down a place on the bench, Croudson was deemed surplus to requirements and left the club in the summer of 2004.

=== Stevenage Borough ===
In the summer of 2004, Croudson returned to Grimsby to train with the club, who were now under the management of Russell Slade. He would provide cover for Town's new number 1 Anthony Williams as he was named as a substitute for the Town's pre-season friendlies against Gainsborough Trinity and Scarborough. Despite this he failed to make an appearance in either game and failed to earn a contract with The Mariners, with Slade mentioning that the Croudson had only been with the club for a few weeks to keep his fitness levels up. Soon followed a move to Conference National side Stevenage Borough for the 2004–2005 season. Steve would make two appearances for Borough, a 3–1 Football League Trophy defeat at the hands of Barnet and a 2–0 home defeat in the league against Woking. Steve left Borough in the January 2005 transfer window.

=== Later career ===
Two months went by and he then signed for Halifax Town in March 2003 but after a month as number 2 keeper to Ian Dunbavin at The Shay, he was released by manager Chris Wilder. With injury problems still surrounding the player he moved to sign for Kettering Town who were managed by former England international Paul Gascoigne. Steve would remain with Kettering for the entire 2005–2006 season.

In July 2006, he moved to Wales and signed for Bangor City briefly in 2006. Soon followed a move to fellow Welsh side Rhyl where he also briefly played. He then returned to England with Non League Unibond Division One side Cammell Laird but Steve opted to retire due to injury in 2007.

== Coaching career ==
Croudson retired in 2007 through ongoing injury woes aged only 26. He returned home to Grimsby and was appointed part-time Goalkeeping coach at Grimsby Town during the 2007–2008 season by Alan Buckley, who was now in his third spell with the club. On 9 July 2010 Croudson played the second half of Grimsby's 1–0 pre-season friendly victory over Non League side Brigg Town. On 30 August 2010 due to injuries to Grimsby keepers Kenny Arthur and Nick Colgan, Croudson was considered to be in contention to make a shock return to the sport to play against Histon in Town's Conference National fixture. Manager Neil Woods eventually confirmed he would play Croudson chosen over youth team keeper Rob Peet and Steve made his first appearance for his home town club since playing in a 2–0 defeat at home to Rotherham United on 5 October 2001. The last time Steve had pulled his gloves on for Grimsby the club had been three divisions higher than their current place inside the Conference. In a solid display, reminiscent of his professional debut for Town 11 years previously Steve pulled off some fine saves and Grimsby were victorious to the scoreline of 2–1 against Histon and was named the man of the match. On 23 October 2010 Croudson played once again in Grimsby's FA Cup tie with Tamworth following Sheffield Wednesday's decision not to let the Mariners use loanee Richard O'Donnell in a cup fixture.

Following his performances during the 10–11 season Croudson picked up four minor awards at the club's annual player of the year award ceremony. He made more first team appearances for Grimsby during the 2010–11 season in his coaching capacity than he did in his five seasons with the club while a player. In the summer of 2011 Grimsby brought in James McKeown as a backup keeper to Kenny Arthur to ease the dependency on Croudson. He didn't appear on a team sheet again until February 2012 when he was named as a substitute for the FA Trophy match at home to York City.

On 8 November 2011 Croudson mixed his coaching and playing duties with being appointed as the club's kitman replacing Mike Bielby who had been at the club since the early nineties.

On 9 May 2014 it was announced that Croudson had departed Grimsby in order to become the academy goalkeeping coach of Premier League side Hull City.

On 12 December 2019 Lincoln City appointed Croudson as their goalkeeping coach.

On 8 July 2022, Croudson returned to Grimsby Town once again, being confirmed as the clubs new first team goalkeeping coach.
