= Phil Jevons =

English footballer & coach (born 1979)

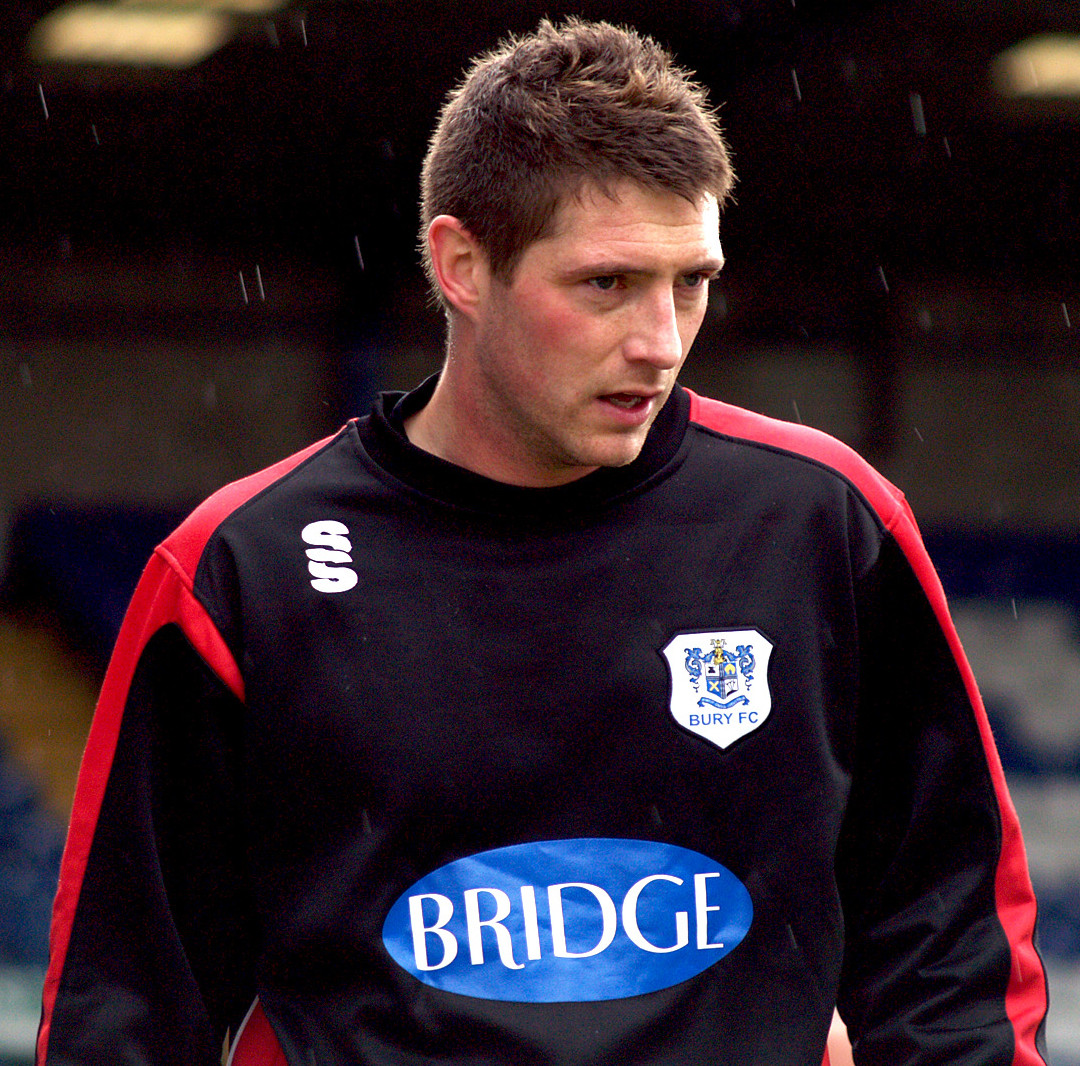
- Jevons whilst with Bury in 2009

Personal information
- Full name: Phillip Jevons
- Date of birth: 1 August 1979 (age 47)
- Place of birth: Liverpool, England
- Height: 5 ft 11 in (1.80 m)
- Position: Striker

Youth career
- 1995–1996: Everton

Senior career*
Years	Team	Apps	(Gls)
1996–2001	Everton	8	(0)
2001–2004	Grimsby Town	63	(18)
2002–2003	→ Hull City (loan)	24	(3)
2004–2006	Yeovil Town	84	(42)
2006–2008	Bristol City	43	(11)
2007–2008	→ Huddersfield Town (loan)	8	(2)
2008–2010	Huddersfield Town	36	(7)
2009	→ Bury (loan)	7	(2)
2009–2010	→ Morecambe (loan)	40	(18)
2010–2012	Morecambe	65	(12)
2012–2013	Hyde	35	(15)
2013–2014	Stockport County	39	(19)
Total		452	(149)
- * Club domestic league appearances and goals

Phillip Jevons (born 1 August 1979) is an English football coach and former professional player who is interim coach at Women's Super League club Everton.

As a player, he was a forward who played between 1996 and 2014 for Everton, Grimsby Town, Hull City, Yeovil Town, Bristol City, Huddersfield Town, Bury, Morecambe, Hyde and Stockport County. Jevons came through the youth academy at Premier League side Everton and was promoted to the club's first team squad in 1996. He made only eight league appearances before being sold to Grimsby Town in 2001. It is as a Grimsby player that he is notably remembered for his 30-yard winning goal in the last minute of extra time against his home town club Liverpool in the third round of the League Cup in 2001 which gave The Mariners a 2–1 victory at Anfield, having initially been 1–0 down. He went on to join Hull City on loan before returning to Grimsby for the 2003–04 campaign.

The following season he joined Yeovil Town where he hit 42 goals in 84 appearances in a two-year spell before signing for Bristol City. In 2008, he joined Huddersfield Town permanently following a short loan spell and again in 2009 was loaned out again to Bury and Morecambe. In 2010, he signed with Morecambe on a permanent basis notching up 12 goals in 65 appearances in his two-year stay. In 2012 following his release from the club he took his first step into non-League football by signing with newly promoted Conference National side Hyde. Jevons netted 15 goals in 35 appearances which aided Hyde's survival in the Conference but on 21 May 2013 he signed for Stockport County who had suffered relegation at the expense of Hyde. In 2014, he announced his retirement to focus on his coaching career. He played his last professional match for Stockport County in a 3–1 win over Harrogate Town in which he scored two goals.

== Playing career ==
=== Everton ===
Born in Liverpool, Merseyside, Jevons is a product of the Everton youth academy. He became one of the better young players in their reserve side, scoring 37 goals in 90 youth team games and winning an FA Premier Reserve League winners medal in 2001. Despite his reputation for frequently scoring in the youth and reserve sides, he failed to break through into the first-team squad on a regular basis. But, he made his first team debut on 10 March 1999 coming on as a 38th-minute substitute for Nick Barmby in a 2–1 Premier League victory over Blackburn Rovers at Ewood Park. He was handed his first start for the club on 22 September 1999 in a 1–0 home defeat in the League Cup by Oxford United, however he was replaced in the 46th minute by Francis Jeffers. His final appearance came on 5 May 2001 when he featured in a 2–1 defeat away at Chelsea. Jevons was transfer listed at the end of the 2000–01 season.

=== Grimsby Town ===
In July 2001, he was sold to Grimsby Town for £250,000. Grimsby were playing in the Football League First Division, and Jevons was one of the first signings of the new campaign for manager Lennie Lawrence. He became an instant hit at Blundell Park and helped fire Grimsby to the top of the league within the first five games of the season, notably his partnership with young striker Jonathan Rowan had shown early promise. On 9 October 2001, he scored a long-range goal in extra time of a League Cup fixture against Liverpool to send Grimsby through to the next round knocking Liverpool out. Jevons finished the 2001–02 season having played 37 games scoring eight goals in all competitions. After three substitute appearances for Grimsby in the 2002–03 season, Jevons was placed on the transfer list due to financial reasons, but was later removed and was sent out on a season-long loan to Humber derby rivals Hull City. He scored three goals in 26 games for Hull, before returning to the Mariners in the summer of 2003 following Grimsby's relegation from the second tier of English football. Following the sacking of Paul Groves and the appointment of Nicky Law, Jevons struck up a good partnership with Isaiah Rankin, he scored four goals in a 6–1 victory over Barnsley on 28 February 2004. Despite this the club suffered a second successive relegation, Jevons finished that season with twelve goals and left the club at the end of the season. In total Jevons scored 24 times as a Grimsby Town player.

=== Yeovil Town ===
On 18 June 2004, he joined Yeovil Town on a free transfer, signing a two-year contract. He made his debut on the opening day of the 2004–05 season in a 3–1 defeat to Bury. He scored his first goal for the club on 10 August 2004, as part of a 1–1 draw with Darlington. He then scored in each of the next two games against Boston United and Notts County respectively. On 18 September 2004, he scored his first hat-trick for the club in a 6–1 win over Oxford United. He went on to score another two hat-trick's that season against Chester City and Bristol Rovers respectively. He finished the 2004–05 season with a total of 29 goals in all competitions. Jevons scored his first goal of the 2005–06 season on 10 September 2005 in a 2–1 win over Walsall. Before the new year he went on to score another seven goals including a brace in a 3–0 win over Nottingham Forest on 22 October 2005. After New Year, he scored another eight goals, including two brace's against Hartlepool United and Huddersfield Town. He finished the 2005–06 season with sixteen goals in all competitions.

=== Bristol City ===
On 22 May 2006, Jevons joined Bristol City on a free transfer, signing a two-year contract following Gary Johnson to Ashton Gate. He scored his first goal as a Bristol City player on 12 August 2006 in a 2–1 defeat to Huddersfield Town. On 3 December 2006 he scored a hat-trick in the FA Cup as part of a 4–3 win over Gillingham. He went on to score a total of seventeen goals in the 2006–07 season, helping his side to promotion to the Football League Championship. He started his 2007–08 campaign off well scoring a brace in a 3–0 win over Brentford in the League Cup. But after going three more games without a goal, he was sent out on a month's loan deal to Huddersfield Town on 22 November 2007.

=== Huddersfield Town ===
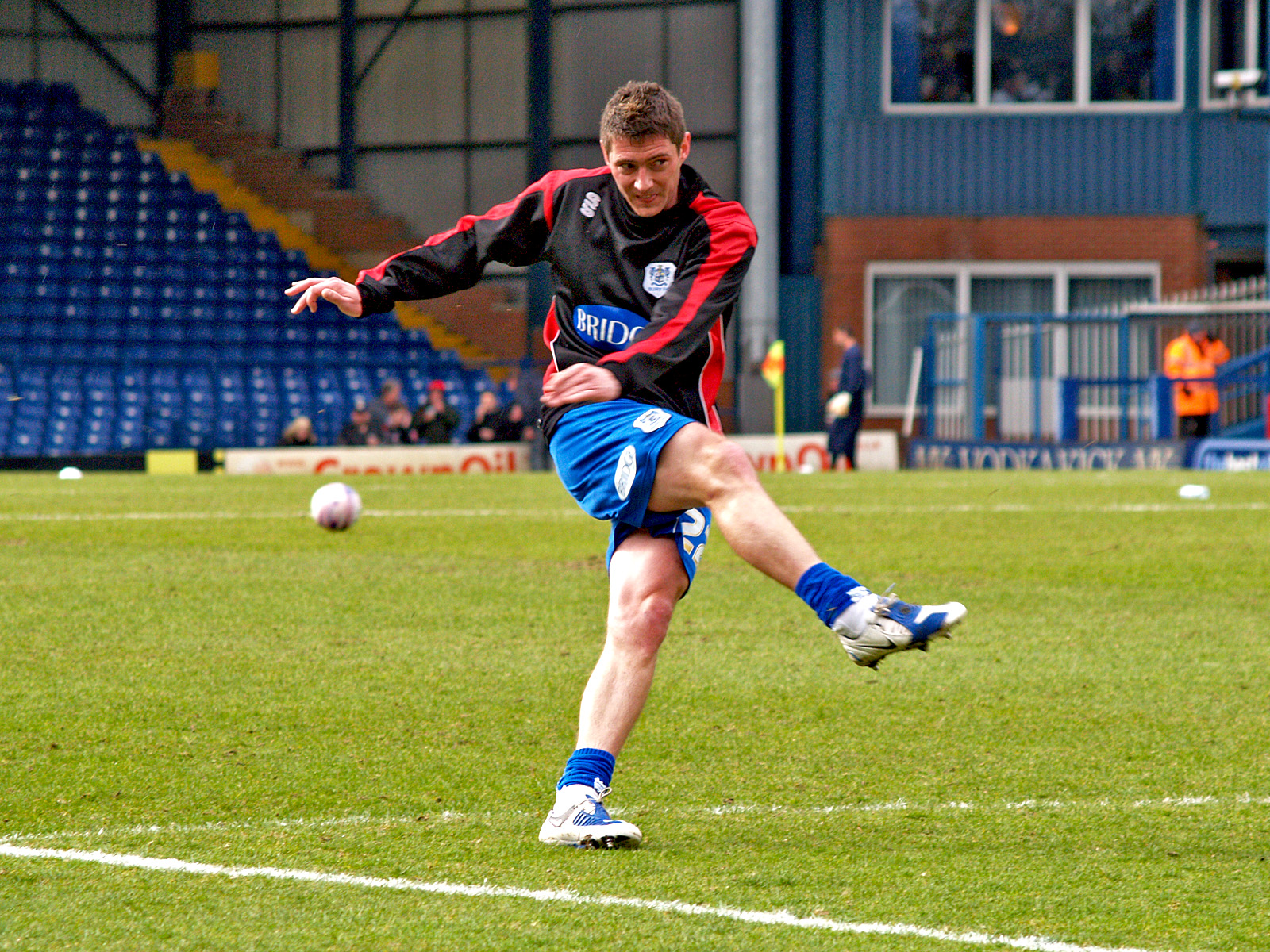
Jevons whilst on loan with Bury in 2009

He made his debut on 24 November 2007, as a substitute in a 1–0 defeat to Leyton Orient at the Galpharm Stadium. On 1 December 2007, he scored his first two goals for the club in a 3–0 against his former team, Grimsby Town to send Huddersfield through to the third round of the FA Cup. He scored his first league goal for the club in a 2–1 win over Bristol Rovers. On 24 December 2007, Jevons's loan at Huddersfield was extended until 19 January 2008. However, on 10 January Jevons was signed for £100,000, a fee that could double to £200,000 depending on appearances and whether Huddersfield could gain promotion. Jevons signed a contract that would take him to the summer of 2010. He scored another five goals in the 2007–08 season, taking his season total to eleven goals for both Bristol City and Huddersfield. After going sixteen games without a goal in the first half of the 2008–09 season, he scored his first goal of the campaign on 10 January 2009 in a 1–1 draw with Northampton Town. He scored his second goal in three games as his side lost 4–2 to Leicester City.

On 21 March 2009, Jevons joined up with Football League Two side Bury on a month's loan deal. On 24 March, he made his debut in a 1–1 draw with Rotherham. After another two games without a goal, he scored his first for the club in a 2–1 win over Shrewsbury Town on 9 April 2009. He netted just one more time for Bury in a 1–0 win over Accrington Stanley.

On 22 July 2009, Jevons signed for Morecambe on a season-long loan deal, along with teammate Ian Craney. He scored his first goal for Morecambe in a 5–2 defeat to Burton Albion on 15 August 2009. He scored brace's against Rochdale and former club Bury respectively. He scored a total of eighteen goals in his season long loan spell at the club.

=== Morecambe ===
After being released from Huddersfield Town, he signed for Morecambe on a permanent deal on 4 July 2010. He scored his first goal since joining Morecambe permanently on 24 August 2010 in a 3–1 Football League Cup defeat to Burnley. On 2 November 2010, he scored a hat-trick in a 5–0 victory over Stockport County. He finished the 2010–11 season having scored nine goals in 41 appearances in all competitions. He scored his first goal of the 2011–12 season on 13 August, in a 3–0 win over Hereford United. Jevons only scored another four goals all season. He was released at the end of the season, manager Jim Bentley stated that Jevons did not fit into his future plans.

=== Hyde ===
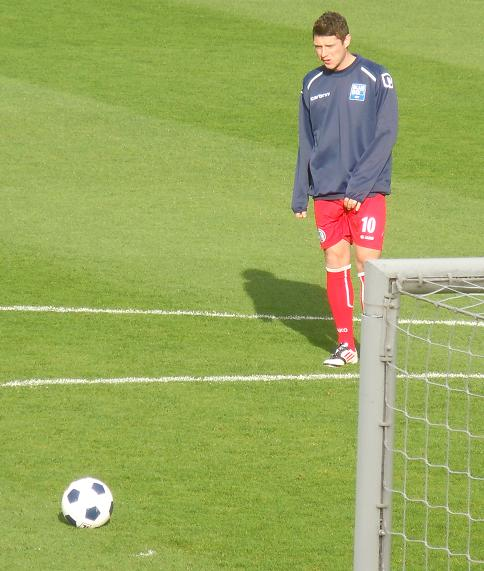
Jevons training with Hyde in 2012

On 16 April he joined Wrexham on trial, but on 12 June 2012 Jevons signed for newly promoted Conference National side Hyde. He scored his first goals for the club, scoring a hat-trick in a 5–2 win over Hereford United in September 2012. He added a fourth of the campaign in his next match—a 3–2 defeat to Lincoln City. He scored his fifth goal in three matches as his side drew 2–2 with Nuneaton Town. After three games without a goal, he scored a brace in the win over Tamworth in October 2012. In December 2012, he scored another four goals in a 7–0 win over Woking, taking his Hyde goal tally to thirteen in nineteen matches. Jevons left Hyde at the end of the season after netting 15 goals in 35 games.

=== Stockport County ===
On 21 May 2013, Jevons signed for newly relegated Conference North side Stockport County. He made his debut for the hatters in a 4–1 defeat to Boston United on the opening day of the 2013–14 season. He scored his first Stockport goals in a 3–1 home win over Gainsborough Trinity on 7 September 2013. Jevons announced his retirement from the game and would play his last ever professional game for the Hatters and netted two goals in a 3–1 win over Harrogate Town.

== Coaching career ==
Jevons began working on his FA Coaching badges and has since returned to Everton to help coach the club's under-9s side as well as continuing to play as a professional. In September 2012 he also became Head coach of the worldwide scouting football project "The Next Football Superstar". He later progressed to work with the Everton Under 18's team.

On 16 September 2021, Jevons signed a contract as a first team and academy coach at Sunderland.

Following the dismissal of manager Lee Johnson, Jevons was temporarily appointed interim assistant manager in order to assist Mike Dodds. Jevons achieved promotion from League one to the Championship. At the end of the 2021–22 season, Jevons was released from his position at Sunderland by Johnson's replacement Alex Neil.

On 16 December 2022, Jevons joined Rochdale as a first team coach.

On 12 February 2026, Everton announced that Phil Jevons would join the backroom staff as an interim coach until the end of the season.

== Personal life ==
Jevons attended both primary and secondary school in the Merseyside town of Gateacre.

== In popular culture ==
Pete Green wrote "The Ballad of Phil Jevons" which appears on the B side of their first seven-inch single Everything I Do Is Gonna Be Sparkly (Atomic Beat Records, 2007 – ABR001). According to the songwriter: "To start with I just wrote the song to amuse my fellow Grimsby-supporting mates, and never intended it for public performance because I didn't think it'd mean anything to anyone. But then I thought: hmm, well, the enigmatic, gifted-but-lazy footballer is sort of an everyman figure really."

== Career statistics ==
Appearances and goals by club, season and competition
Club	Season	League			FA Cup		League Cup		Other		Total	
Club	Season	Division	Apps	Goals	Apps	Goals	Apps	Goals	Apps	Goals	Apps	Goals
Everton	1998–99	Premier League	1	0	0	0	0	0	—		1	0
Everton	1999–2000	Premier League	3	0	0	0	1	0	—		4	0
Everton	2000–01	Premier League	4	0	0	0	0	0	—		4	0
Everton	Total		8	0	0	0	1	0	—		9	0
Grimsby Town	2001–02	First Division	31	6	2	0	4	2	—		37	8
Grimsby Town	2002–03	First Division	3	0	0	0	0	0	—		3	0
Grimsby Town	2003–04	Second Division	29	12	1	1	0	0	0	0	30	13
Grimsby Town	Total		63	18	3	1	4	2	0	0	70	21
Hull City (loan)	2002–03	Third Division	24	3	1	0	1	0	0	0	26	3
Yeovil Town	2004–05	League Two	46	27	4	2	2	0	0	0	52	29
Yeovil Town	2005–06	League One	38	15	3	1	1	0	1 (Note: Appearances in Football League Trophy)	0	43	16
Yeovil Town	Total		84	42	7	3	3	0	1	0	85	45
Bristol City	2006–07	League One	41	11	5	4	1	0	4	2	51	17
Bristol City	2007–08	Championship	2	0	0	0	2	2	0	0	4	2
Bristol City	Total		43	11	5	4	3	2	4	2	55	19
Huddersfield Town	2007–08 (Note: Jevons made 10 appearances on loan for the club before joining permanently on 10 January 2008)	League One	8	2	2	2	0	0	0	0	10	4
Huddersfield Town	2007–08	League One	13	5	2	0	0	0	0	0	15	5
Huddersfield Town	2008–09	League One	23	2	1	0	1	0	0	0	25	2
Huddersfield Town	Total		44	9	5	2	1	0	0	0	50	11
Bury (loan)	2008–09	League Two	7	2	0	0	0	0	2 (Note: Appearances in Football League Two play-offs)	0	9	2
Morecambe (loan)	2009–10	League Two	40	18	2	1	0	0	2	0	44	19
Morecambe	2010–11	League Two	38	8	1	0	2	1	0	0	41	9
Morecambe	2011–12	League Two	27	4	1	0	1	0	1	1	30	5
Morecambe	Total		105	30	4	1	3	1	3	1	115	33
Hyde	2012–13	Conference Premier	35	15	2	1	—		2 (Note: Appearances in FA Trophy)	0	39	16
Stockport County	2013–14	Conference North	39	19	2	0	—		2	2	43	21
Career totals			452	149	29	12	16	5	14	5	511	171

== Honours ==
Everton

- FA Youth Cup: 1998

Yeovil Town

- Football League Two: 2004–05

Individual

- Grimsby Town Supporters' Player of the Year: 2003–04
- Football League Two Golden Boot: 2004–05
- PFA Team of the Year: 2004–05 Football League Two
- FA Cup Player of the Round (second round): 2005–06
