= Chris Thompson (footballer, born 1982) =

English footballer (born 1982)

Personal information
- Full name: Christopher Michael Thompson
- Date of birth: 7 February 1982 (age 44)
- Place of birth: Warrington, England
- Position: Striker

Youth career
- 1999–2000: Liverpool

Senior career*
Years	Team	Apps	(Gls)
2000–2001	Liverpool	0	(0)
2001–2003	Grimsby Town	14	(1)
2003–2004	Northwich Victoria	27	(3)
200?	→ Droylsden (loan)		
200?	→ Leek Town (loan)		
2005–2006	Chorley		
2006–2007	Scarborough		
2007–2008	Barrow	24	(5)
2008	→ Fleetwood Town (loan)	1	(0)
2008–2010	Leigh Genesis		
2010–2011	Bamber Bridge		
2011–2012	Warrington Town		
2012–2013	Salford City		
- * Club domestic league appearances and goals as of 02:44, 28 April 2008 (UTC)

Christopher Michael Thompson (born 7 February 1982) is an English former professional footballer, who played as a striker.

He notably played in the Football League for Grimsby Town, before moving into Non-League football with Northwich Victoria, Droylsden, Leek Town, Chorley, Scarborough, Barrow, Fleetwood Town, Leigh Genesis and Bamber Bridge.

== Career ==
Thompson joined Liverpool as a youngster but was released in 2001 despite being the club's reserve team top scorer during the 2000/2001 season. Thompson made his debut for his new club Grimsby Town, coming on as a substitute in the 74th minute, at home to Norwich City, in a 2–0 defeat in the First Division on 30 October 2001. He made fourteen league appearances for Grimsby, scoring one goal. In 2003, he moved to Northwich Victoria where he scored three goal in 27 league appearances. He spent time on loan at Droylsden and Leek Town before moving to Chorley in 2005 and the following season to Scarborough, where he scored sixteen goals in the 2006-07 season. Later in 2007 he moved to Barrow, then in the Conference North, where he was a member of the squad that won promotion through the end-of-season play-offs to the Conference National in 2007-08, scoring sixteen goals. On 5 September 2008 he signed a one-month loan deal with Conference North club Fleetwood Town, where he played in one league match and one Conference League Cup match.

== Honours ==
=== Barrow ===
- Conference North play-off final winner: 2007-08
