= Michael Boulding =

English footballer and tennis player

Personal information
- Full name: Michael Thomas Boulding
- Date of birth: 8 February 1976 (age 50)
- Place of birth: Sheffield, England
- Positions: Forward; winger

Youth career
- Doncaster Rovers

Senior career*
Years	Team	Apps	(Gls)
1998–1999	Hallam		
1999–2001	Mansfield Town	65	(12)
2001–2002	Grimsby Town	35	(11)
2002–2003	Aston Villa	0	(0)
2002	→ Sheffield United (loan)	6	(0)
2003	→ Grimsby Town (loan)	1	(1)
2003–2004	Grimsby Town	38	(15)
2004–2005	Barnsley	35	(10)
2005	→ Cardiff City (loan)	4	(0)
2006	Rotherham United	0	(0)
2006–2008	Mansfield Town	82	(27)
2008–2010	Bradford City	64	(16)
2010–2011	Barnsley	0	(0)
2011	Derby County	0	(0)
Total		330	(92)
- * Club domestic league appearances and goals

Michael Thomas Boulding (born 8 February 1976) is an English former professional footballer and tennis player. As a footballer he was a forward and winger from 1998 to 2011. Prior to his football career, he was a promising young tennis player, ranking among the top 20 players in Britain.

He notably played in the Football League with several spells each with Grimsby Town and Mansfield Town. in 2002 he signed for Premier League side Aston Villa however he would only feature in the UEFA Intertoto Cup and six months later had returned to Grimsby on a permanent deal. He also played professionally for Sheffield United, Barnsley, Cardiff City, Rotherham United and Bradford City before retiring with a short spell at Derby County in 2011. Prior to his professional career he had played non-league football for Hallam.

He is the brother of fellow footballer Rory Boulding and singer-songwriter Helen Boulding. Following his retirement he has worked away from sport and spent a time working for his family owned property business.

== Tennis career ==
Boulding was both a skilled footballer and tennis player as a schoolboy, but he was persuaded to pursue a career in the latter sport when he was talent spotted by coach Tony Pickard at the age of 13. Boulding was part of the national squad and played in events across the world, including India, South America, the Far East, and also the junior Wimbledon Championships and the qualifying rounds of the main Grand Slam event. During his career he roomed with Tim Henman and was ranked the top 20 players in Britain. He held an ATP singles world ranking between 8 July 1996 and 1 November 1999, apart from between 25 August 1997 and 24 August 1998, which peaked at 1,119 with four world ranking points on 3 May 1999. His highest doubles ranking was 964 on 10 February 1997 with 15 ranking points.

== Football career ==
=== Hallam and Mansfield Town ===
Boulding maintained his links with football and trained with Doncaster Rovers, and in 1998 he joined non-league Hallam near his home in Sheffield. His form at Hallam attracted the interest of a number of league clubs, and Boulding was offered a trial by Mansfield Town. He was given a contract by the Division Three side and turned professional in 1999, which brought an end to his tennis career. He made his debut with Mansfield in a League Cup game against Nottingham Forest on 11 August 1999 as a late substitute for Gary Tallon, before his first league game came three days later against Cheltenham Town. He had to wait until his 12th game as a professional to register his first goal when he scored in a 2–1 victory over Shrewsbury Town on 23 October. He eventually finished his first season with six goals with Mansfield coming 17th but 17 points above Carlisle United, the only side to be relegated out of The Football League.

During September and October of the 1999–2000 season, Boulding scored in four successive league games. However, he could only score another two goals during the rest of the campaign to once again record a tally of six goals. His last goal came only two minutes after he had come on as a substitute during Mansfield's penultimate game of the season against Scunthorpe United, which helped the team to their fourth successive home victory and a final league position of 13th. Boulding's two-year contract with Mansfield had finished and he left after playing 74 appearances in all competitions for Mansfield, of which 41 were as a substitute. During his two seasons he scored 12 goals, all in the league.

=== Grimsby Town ===
Having left Mansfield, Boulding joined Division One side Grimsby Town on a free transfer in September 2001. His debut was as a second-half substitute in a 3–3 draw with Stockport County on 22 September 2001, before he scored his first Grimsby goal a week later away at Bradford City. Boulding was involved in Grimsby's League Cup upset, when they defeated cup holders Liverpool with a 2–1 extra-time victory, but they struggled in the league. Boulding was in and out of the starting eleven, but when he was recalled to the side for the visit of Crystal Palace on 2 March 2002 in place of Martin Pringle, who had broken his leg, Boulding scored in a 5–2 victory to ease their relegation worries. He scored again three days later in a defeat, and followed it up with the first hat-trick of his career in a 6–2 victory later the same month against Wimbledon, which moved them out of the relegation zone. Grimsby's survival was ensured before the end of the season, when they defeated Burnley 3–1, with two goals from Boulding. Boulding finished Grimsby's leading scorer for the 2001–02 season with 11 goals in 39 appearances, and with his one-year contract due to expire in the summer, he was offered a new contract by the club. Boulding, however, turned down the offer and instead joined Aston Villa in July 2002 on a Bosman free transfer.

=== Aston Villa and return to Grimsby Town ===
Boulding was immediately involved in Aston Villa's Intertoto Cup campaign, making his debut against FC Zürich on 21 August 2002 in a 2–0 defeat, before he scored the first goal in the second leg as Aston Villa overturned the first leg deficit to win 3–2 on aggregate. However, he did not make an appearance in the Premier League and in September 2002, he joined Sheffield United on a one-month loan with a view to a permanent move. The loan deal was extended for a second month, but an ankle injury restricted his opportunities at Sheffield United and he returned to Aston Villa in November 2002. He played seven times for United, scoring one goal in a League Cup tie with Wycombe Wanderers.

Only six months after joining Aston Villa, Boulding returned to Grimsby Town in January 2003, initially on a one-month loan, to allow him to play the following day against Wimbledon, and then on an 18-month contract only days later He opened the scoring on his return in a 3–3 draw with Wimbledon, and added another three goals in his following five games. However, he was unable to add any more goals and due to injury he missed the run in to the end of the season and Grimsby were relegated from Division One in 24th place.

Boulding scored Grimsby's first goal of the 2003–04 season, during the opening day 2–2 draw with Plymouth Argyle. He continued to be in the goals at the start of the season and added another five by mid-September, scored in successive games during October to guide Grimsby to back-to-back victories, and had scored 13 goals by the end of 2003. However, manager Paul Groves was sacked in January 2004 following a run of poor results which culminated in a 6–0 defeat to Oldham Athletic, leaving Grimsby one point off the relegation places. Boulding, who said he had previously stayed because of Groves, himself immediately left the club, moving to Barnsley in February 2004 for a fee of £50,000, having scored a total of 17 goals from 42 games during his second spell with Grimsby. He later said the decision to leave was the worst of his career and that he had had his happiest times at Grimsby, saying "Grimsby is the club I have been happiest at. Leaving for Barnsley was the biggest mistake I've made in my football career." Despite leaving the club early in the season, Boulding finished top-scorer – tied with Phil Jevons – with 13 goals.

=== Barnsley and Rotherham United ===
Barnsley, like Grimsby Town, were in Division Two, but in a mid-table position. Boulding's first game for his new club was on 14 February 2004, in a 1–0 defeat to Wrexham. Three games after Boulding signed for Barnsley, they sacked manager Gudjon Thordarsson and replaced him with Paul Hart, who asked Boulding to play at left wing. Boulding played six games in total before the end of the season, which included an early return to Grimsby resulting in a 6–1 defeat for Barnsley, but he failed to score a goal. He recorded his first goals for his new club in the third game of the 2004–05 season in a 4–3 defeat to Luton Town on 14 August 2004, when he scored twice. He failed to score again until November and only netted one more by the end of 2004, but in the first four games of the New Year he scored another five goals. He ended up scoring 10 goals for Barnsley from 38 games but he fell out of favour and was sent out on loan to Cardiff City in March 2005 for the rest of the season. He played four games for the Championship-side, all as substitute, without scoring. He returned to Barnsley but was released by manager Andy Ritchie at the end of the season.

Boulding was tracked by Bradford City and Crewe Alexandra, with whom he was offered a contract after a successful trial, but instead decided to retire from professional football after being asked to play on the left wing. Crewe manager Dario Gradi said: "He told me he was going to retire because he didn't want to sit on the bench all season—or drop down the divisions." His retirement lasted seven months while he worked for his father's company until he joined Rotherham United in March 2006 following three reserve games. He signed for the rest of the 2005–06 season, but did not make any first-team appearances for Rotherham and left the club at the end of the season.

=== Return to Mansfield Town ===
In July 2006, Boulding returned to League Two side Mansfield Town, and after impressing manager Peter Shirtliff in pre-season training, he was offered a contract. His younger brother Rory Boulding also joined Mansfield at the same time. His first game back at Mansfield was on the opening day of the 2006–07 season in a 2–2 draw with Shrewsbury Town, before he scored in the following game as Mansfield defeated Milton Keynes Dons 2–1. At the end of September he was sidelined by a knee injury, which kept him out of the side for a month, and in January 2007 he was angry after he was dropped to the substitutes' bench in favour of fellow strikers Barry Conlon and Martin Gritton for a game against Hereford United. Mansfield won the game 3–1 with Boulding coming on to score one of the goals. He finished the season with just six goals from 45 games, as Mansfield finished in 17th position.

Boulding's 2007–08 season started in better form, when he scored in a 1–1 draw with Brentford on the opening day of the campaign, which was followed up with goals in each of Mansfield's next three league fixtures. Despite his goals, Mansfield were soon at the bottom of the table. The club found some respite from their league form in the FA Cup; their run started with a 3–0 victory against Conference South side Lewes when both Boulding brothers scored, and was followed with a 3–2 defeat of another non-league team, Harrogate Railway Athletic, when Boulding scored twice in a televised game. However, Boulding missed a penalty in Mansfield's next league game as they remained bottom of the table following a goalless draw with Bradford City, before they were knocked out of the FA Cup by Premier League club Middlesbrough in the fourth round once again live on television. Boulding, who hit the crossbar during the game, was pleased with the side's performance, saying: "If we can take that sort of performance into the league, we'll definitely get out of this relegation battle." While Boulding's own goalscoring form continued, Mansfield failed to pick up enough points to stay up. He finished the season with 25 goals, including a hat-trick in his penultimate game against Shrewsbury Town.

By the end of the season, Boulding had made 92 appearances, scoring 31 goals, in his second spell at Mansfield. After Mansfield's relegation to the Football Conference, he was out of contract, and as well as being offered new terms by the club, at least four League Two clubs also tried to sign him. In July 2008, he and his brother both decided to leave Mansfield Town after turning down their offer, with a reported 15 other clubs interested in offering him a contract.

=== Bradford City ===
Boulding's goals attracted interest from a number of clubs including League One side Cheltenham Town, and League Two teams Bradford City, former clubs Grimsby Town and Rotherham United, and Lincoln City. Boulding and his brother were expected to sign for Cheltenham Town but had a change of heart and instead moved to League Two side Bradford City on a two-year contract in July 2008, joining the team on their tour of Scotland. Boulding was one of four Bradford players to make his debut on the opening day of the 2008–09 season against Notts County. He was a second-half substitute replacing fellow striker Barry Conlon, as Bradford won 2–1. His first goal for City came in their third game of the season to open the scoring in a 2–0 victory against Rochdale on 23 August 2008, which put them second in the table. Along with Barry Conlon and Peter Thorne, Boulding was one of three strikers at City who all scored 10 goals by February as City maintained their push for the play-offs. Boulding finished the season with 13 goals, but admitted his performance had been "very average", and was one player who took a pay cut after the club missed out on promotion.

Boulding started the first game of his second season with Bradford City, which ended with City losing 5–0 to Notts County, but he soon lost his place to new signings Gareth Evans and James Hanson and so had to wait another seven weeks for his second start which came against Northampton Town because Evans was suspended. He scored his first goal of the season in the game to give City a 2–0 lead, but his side conceded twice for the game to finish in a 2–2 draw. He scored in the club's following two games, but was then kept out of the side for two weeks by a virus. Upon his return, he scored his 100th career goal and his fourth goal in five games as a late consolation in an FA Cup defeat to Notts County. However, Boulding continued to struggle to maintain a first-team place and was released early from his contract in March 2010, along with his brother under mutual consent, after failing to make a single start under new manager Peter Taylor. He had played 71 games at City, although nearly one-third were as substitute, and scored 19 goals.

=== Return to Barnsley and transfer to Derby County ===
Boulding returned on trial to former clubs Mansfield Town, with his brother Rory, and Barnsley. Boulding offered to play for free on a short-term deal at the latter club and started the season with the Championship side, being named on the bench for the club's opening match away to Queens Park Rangers. He was an unused substitute as his new side lost 4–0. Boulding was limited to reserve team football, which included a goal against Nottingham Forest. He failed to appear for the first-team and in February 2011, he was given a trial with another Championship club Derby County scoring in a reserve game against Walsall. After his trial, Boulding joined Derby on a non-contract deal until the end of the 2010–11 season. He played for the reserves before he earned his first call-up to the Derby team for a game against Crystal Palace. He was an unused substitute in a 2–2 draw. Boulding did not feature in the Derby first-team and they did not retain him at the end of the season. He did however train with the club during pre-season ahead of the 2011–12 season and played in a friendly against Burton Albion.

== Personal life ==
Michael Boulding was born on 8 February 1976 in Sheffield, England, to Mick and Deirdre Boulding. Boulding has four sisters, Sally, Mary, singer-songwriter Helen, and Laura, and a younger brother, Rory, who is 12 years his junior, and was born after the family moved to Sheffield. Boulding's family own a property business, Merlin Estates, which he briefly worked for when he decided to retire from football in 2005. The firm went into compulsory liquidation in 2009. Boulding lives with his brother, Rory.

== Career statistics ==
Updated to 25 February 2011.

Appearances and goals by club, season and competition
Club	Season	League		FA Cup		League Cup		Other		Total	
Club	Season	Apps	Goals	Apps	Goals	Apps	Goals	Apps	Goals	Apps	Goals
Hallam	1998–99										
Mansfield Town	1999–2000	32	6	1	0	2	0	1	0	36	6
Mansfield Town	2000–01	33	6	2	0	2	0	1	0	38	6
Total		65	12	3	0	4	0	2	0	74	12
Grimsby Town	2001–02	35	11	2	0	2	0	0	0	39	11
Aston Villa	2002–03	0	0	0	0	0	0	2	1	2	1
Sheffield United (loan)	2002–03	6	0	0	0	1	1	0	0	7	1
Grimsby Town	2002–03	12	4	0	0	0	0	0	0	12	4
Grimsby Town	2003–04	27	12	1	1	1	0	1	0	30	13
Total		39	16	1	1	1	0	1	0	42	17
Barnsley	2003–04	6	0	0	0	0	0	0	0	6	0
Barnsley	2004–05	29	10	1	0	1	0	1	0	32	10
Total		35	10	1	0	1	0	1	0	38	10
Cardiff City (loan)	2004–05	4	0	0	0	0	0	0	0	4	0
Mansfield Town	2006–07	39	5	3	0	2	1	1	0	45	6
Mansfield Town	2007–08	43	22	3	3	1	0	0	0	47	25
Total		82	27	6	3	3	1	1	0	92	31
Bradford City	2008–09	43	12	2	1	1	0	1	0	46	13
Bradford City	2009–10	21	4	1	1	1	0	2	1	25	6
Total		64	16	3	2	2	0	3	1	71	19
Barnsley	2010–11	0	0	0	0	0	0	0	0	0	0
Derby County	2010–11	0	0	0	0	0	0	0	0	0	0
Career total		330	92	16	6	14	2	10	2	369	102
