= Lennie Lawrence =

English football manager (born 1947)

Personal information
- Full name: Robin Michael Lawrence
- Date of birth: 12 December 1947 (age 78)
- Place of birth: Brighton, England

Senior career*
Years	Team	Apps	(Gls)
- Croydon
- Carshalton Athletic
- Sutton United

Managerial career
- 1978: Plymouth Argyle (caretaker)
- 1982–1991: Charlton Athletic
- 1991–1994: Middlesbrough
- 1994–1995: Bradford City
- 1995–2000: Luton Town
- 2000–2001: Grimsby Town
- 2002–2005: Cardiff City
- 2012: Crystal Palace (caretaker)
- 2024: Hartlepool United (caretaker)
- 2024–2025: Hartlepool United
- * Club domestic league appearances and goals

Robin Michael Lawrence, commonly known as Lennie Lawrence, (born 12 December 1947) is an English football manager.

Lawrence was a semi-professional at Croydon, Carshalton Athletic and Sutton United before becoming caretaker manager of Plymouth Argyle in 1978. He went on to manage Charlton Athletic, Middlesbrough (during their debut season in the Premier League), Bradford City, Luton Town and Grimsby Town and Cardiff City. He is one of a select few managers to have managed over 1,000 games.

Since 2005 Lawrence has worked at a number of clubs as either part of the coaching staff or in a Director of Football role. He joined Stevenage in June 2020 as a managerial advisor, to begin at either the restart of the 2019–20 season or the start of the 2020–21 season, following three years as the management consultant to Newport County, Lawrence left this role in early November 2020.

== Playing career ==
Lawrence turned out at non-league level for Croydon, Carshalton Athletic and Sutton United during his semi-professional career.

== Managerial career ==
=== Plymouth Argyle and Lincoln City ===
He came to Plymouth as Assistant Manager to Mike Kelly and when Kelly was sacked he got his first managerial appointment at Plymouth Argyle as caretaker and then worked alongside Malcolm Allison as Assistant. He later worked as a coach at Lincoln City, helping them win promotion from Division Four in the 1980–81 season.

=== Charlton Athletic ===
Lawrence moved to Charlton Athletic as reserve-team manager, and was later promoted to full-time manager in 1982. appointing Leicester City first team coach Eddie May, as his assistant. During his first few years in charge, the club was in a poor financial situation and came close to going out of business in 1984, and even left its home ground, The Valley, in 1985. Despite this, Lawrence and May, not only kept Charlton in the Second Division but gained promotion to the First Division in 1986, ending Charlton's 29-year absence from the top-flight. With limited resources, he kept Charlton at this level for four years, before being relegated in 1990. He remained in charge for a further season.

=== Middlesbrough ===
Before the start of the 1991–92 season, Lawrence moved on to manage Middlesbrough. Under his stewardship, Middlesbrough finished Second Division runners-up in his first season as manager and gained promotion to the new Premier League but they struggled in 1992–93 and were relegated at the end of the season. Lawrence remained in charge until the end of the following season, his departure being confirmed on 2 May 1994. Upon leaving he helped young chairman Steve Gibson contact his replacement Bryan Robson.

=== Bradford City and move to Luton Town ===
Lawrence joined Bradford City at the beginning of the 1994–95 season. After a mid-table finish in his first season, Bradford were challenging for promotion in his second season in charge before he left to manage struggling Luton Town in the division above. Lawrence was unable to save Luton from relegation to Division Two at the end of the 1995–96 season, which saw them replaced by former club Bradford. He remained in charge at Kenilworth Road until 2000 when he was sacked by the new incoming Luton chairman, Mike Watson Challis, and replaced with former Luton fans favourite, Ricky Hill.

=== Grimsby Town ===
He made a quick return to management shortly after the beginning of the 2000–01 season with Division One side Grimsby Town. They avoided relegation and made a reasonable start to the 2001–02 season, and caused an upset in the League Cup third round by knocking out holders Liverpool 2–1 after extra time at Anfield, scoring with a Phil Jevons wonder-goal in the last minute. However, he was sacked later in the season after Grimsby dropped to the bottom of the table.

During the opening weeks of the 2001–02 season, his Grimsby side had briefly led Division One, sparking hopes that he could repeat the promotion success he achieved at Charlton Athletic and Middlesbrough with a much smaller club. However, these hopes were quickly extinguished as Grimsby's form plunged.

=== Cardiff City ===
After a short while out of the game he joined Division Two side Cardiff City as a consultant. Owner Sam Hammam had made it clear to manager Alan Cork that he expected back-to-back promotions, which it did not look like Cork was going to deliver. Eventually Cork was sacked, and Lawrence took over the manager's chair. In his first full season in charge, Lawrence took Cardiff to promotion after beating Queens Park Rangers in the 2003 Football League Second Division play-off final. He remained at Ninian Park for a further two years before being replaced in May 2005.

=== Hartlepool United ===
Following the sacking of Darren Sarll in October 2024, Lawrence was appointed caretaker manager of Hartlepool United. He was also previously caretaker manager the previous season. On 8 November 2024, he was permanently appointed manager of Hartlepool until the end of the season. On 3 February 2025, Lawrence announced that he had stepped back from his role to allow head coach Anthony Limbrick to take over as manager.

== Coaching career ==
After acting as a consultant at Cardiff for a while, he was appointed Director of Football at Bristol Rovers, working alongside coach Paul Trollope in a two-tier managerial structure. In the pair's first full season in charge, Bristol Rovers won promotion into League One after winning the League Two play-offs. He remained in this position until leaving the club on 12 May 2010, with their League One status still intact.

In August 2010 Lawrence joined non-league Carshalton Athletic in a football consultancy role, assisting manager Mark Butler. Four months later he was appointed technical director at Hereford United in League Two, to assist new manager Jamie Pitman.

On 20 January 2011, he was appointed assistant manager at Crystal Palace, to support new rookie manager, Dougie Freedman. In October 2012 Freedman became manager at Bolton Wanderers, and Lawrence was named as a joint-caretaker manager at Crystal Palace with Curtis Fleming, but within a week Lawrence rejoined Freedman at Bolton.

Lawrence's first game at Bolton was a victory over former club Cardiff at the Reebok Stadium, in which a Martin Petrov penalty and a further goal from David Ngog gave Wanderers a 2–1 victory. At the end of the season, Bolton missed out on a Play Off place to Leicester City

On 3 October 2014, he left Bolton along with fellow coach Curtis Fleming following the sacking of Dougie Freedman as manager. He later joined Freedman as assistant manager at Nottingham Forest in early 2015.

During the Summer of 2016 Lawrence became assistant manager to Paul Trollope at Cardiff City. However, a poor start to the 2016/2017 season saw Paul Trollope sacked in the October at which time Lawrence also departed from the club.

== Consultancy roles ==
On 21 March 2017, Lawrence joined Newport County as First Team Management Consultant to new manager Mike Flynn with Newport 11 points adrift at the bottom of League Two. A remarkable turnaround in the remaining 12 league games saw Newport complete the Great Escape and avoid relegation with a win against Notts County with a 89th-minute winner on the final day of the 2016–17 season. Lawrence departed County in June 2020 at the end of the 2019–20 EFL League Two season. Lawrence announced his move to Stevenage in June 2020 and is set to start employment there "either the recommencement of the 2019–20 season or the start of the 2020–21 season", with the club in the relegation spot at the end of the 2019–20 EFL League Two season. He serves as the Managerial Advisor to Alex Revell. In December 2020, Lawrence left the club.

Lawrence announced his move to Stevenage in June 2020, set to start employment there "either the recommencement of the 2019–20 season or the start of the 2020–21 season", with the club in the relegation spot at the end of the 2019–20 EFL League Two season. He served as the Managerial Advisor to Alex Revell. In December 2020, Lawrence left the club.

On 10 November 2022, Lawrence was appointed as a non-executive director at Hartlepool United. Following the sacking of John Askey, Lawrence was appointed caretaker manager in January 2024. After Kevin Phillips was appointed as Askey's successor, it was confirmed that Lawrence would be one of his assistant managers.

In October 2026, Lawrence joined Hampton & Richmond Borough to mentor co-Interim managers Max Kretzschmar and Craig Saunders.

== Managerial statistics ==
Team	Nat	From	To	Record				
Team	Nat	From	To	G	W	D	L	Win %
Plymouth Argyle	(England)	14 February 1978	16 March 1978	5	0	3	2	0.00
Charlton Athletic	(England)	22 November 1982	10 July 1991	393	120	109	164	30.53
Middlesbrough	(England)	10 July 1991	2 May 1994	187	75	52	60	40.11
Bradford City	(England)	25 May 1994	27 November 1995	77	29	20	28	37.66
Luton Town	(England)	21 December 1995	4 July 2000	248	89	66	93	35.89
Grimsby Town	(England)	29 August 2000	28 December 2001	77	22	19	36	28.57
Cardiff City	(Wales)	18 February 2002	25 May 2005	174	72	50	52	41.38
Crystal Palace	(England)	23 October 2012	1 November 2012	2	1	0	1	50.00
Hartlepool United (caretaker)	(England)	3 January 2024	23 January 2024	5	2	1	2	40.00
Hartlepool United	(England)	16 October 2024	3 February 2025	16	5	8	3	31.25
Total				1,184	415	328	441	35.05

§: Joint caretaker manager with Curtis Fleming

== Honours ==
Charlton Athletic

- Football League Second Division second-place promotion: 1985–86
- Full Members' Cup runner-up: 1986–87

Middlesbrough

- Football League Second Division second-place promotion: 1991–92

Cardiff City

- Football League Second Division play-offs: 2003

Individual

- Football League First Division Manager of the Month: August 2001
- Football League Championship Manager of the Month: January 2005

== See also ==
- List of football managers with the most matches
