= 2004 Portland Timbers season =

Portland Timbers
2004 season
- President: Mark Schuster (to April 2); Tom Lasley (interim; from April 2)
- Head coach: Bobby Howe
- Stadium: PGE Park; Portland, Oregon
- A-League: Conference: 1st Overall: 1st (Commissioner's Cup)^{[A]} Playoffs: Western Conference semifinals
- U.S. Open Cup: Fourth round
- Cascadia Cup: 2nd
- Top goalscorer: League: Alan Gordon (17 goals); All: Byron Alvarez (18 goals)
- Highest home attendance: League: 7,833 vs. MIL (Aug 29); All: 10,622 vs. SJE (Jul 14)
- Lowest home attendance: 3,519 vs. CGY (May 13)
- Average home league attendance: League: 5,281; All: 5,589
Home colors	Away colors

The 2004 Portland Timbers season was the 4th season for the Portland Timbers—the 3rd incarnation of a club to bear the Timbers name—of the now-defunct A-League, the second-tier league of the United States and Canada at the time.

== Regular season ==
=== May ===
May 1, 2004 A-L / Qual / CC	Portland Timbers	2–1	Seattle Sounders	Portland, Oregon
19:00 (PDT)	Gordon 1'; Alvarez 71'	Report	(red card) 42' Edwards; 75' Smith	Stadium: PGE Park; Attendance: 6,891; Referee: Corey Dean (USA)

May 13, 2004 A-L	Portland Timbers	2–1	Calgary Mustangs	Portland, Oregon
19:00 (PDT)	Alvarez 25'; Bengard 49'	Report	41' Smith	Stadium: PGE Park; Attendance: 3,519; Referee: David Simon (USA)

May 15, 2004 A-L / Qual / CC	Seattle Sounders	0–1	Portland Timbers	Seattle
19:00 (PDT)		Report	52' Sagare	Stadium: Seahawks Stadium; Attendance: 3,907; Referee: Baldomero Toledo (USA)

May 23, 2004 A-L / CC	Vancouver Whitecaps	1–3	Portland Timbers	Burnaby, British Columbia Canada
19:00 (PDT)	Xausa 29'	Report	34', 65' Gordon; 41' Alcaraz-Cuellar	Stadium: Swangard Stadium; Attendance: 4,954; Referee: Jean-François Corrivault (Canada)

May 29, 2004 A-L	Portland Timbers	3–2 (a.e.t.)	Milwaukee Wave United	Portland, Oregon
19:00 (PDT)	Gordon 64', 85' 96'	Report	15' To. Dusosky; 50' Torres	Stadium: PGE Park; Attendance: 4,067; Referee: Brian D'Amato (USA)

=== June ===
June 4, 2004 A-L	Charleston Battery	1–2	Portland Timbers	Charleston, South Carolina
17:00 (PDT)	Conway 42'	Report	29' Gordon; (red card) 62' Alvarez; 90' (pen.) Bengard	Stadium: Blackbaud Stadium; Attendance: 4,370; Referee: Andres Pfefferkorn (USA)

June 5, 2004 A-L	Atlanta Silverbacks	4–3	Portland Timbers	Clarkston, Georgia
15:00 (PDT)	De Lima 34' (pen.); Cozier 67', 71'; Woods 82'	Report	8', 60' Gordon; 70' Antoniuk	Stadium: DeKalb Memorial Stadium; Attendance: 1,756; Referee: Roni Canales (USA)

June 10, 2004 A-L	Portland Timbers	6–0	Edmonton Aviators	Portland, Oregon
19:00 (PDT)	Alvarez 27', 61', 73'; Alcaraz-Cuellar 44'; Gordon 45'; Antoniuk 60'	Report		Stadium: PGE Park; Attendance: 3,576; Referee: David Simon (USA)

June 12, 2004 A-L / CC	Portland Timbers	0–1 (a.e.t.)	Vancouver Whitecaps	Portland, Oregon
19:00 (PDT)		Report	95' Griffiths	Stadium: PGE Park; Attendance: 5,093; Referee: Kari Seitz (USA)

June 17, 2004 A-L	Portland Timbers	1–2	Rochester Raging Rhinos	Portland, Oregon
19:00 (PDT)	Bengard 75' (pen.)	Report	38' K. Wilson; 90' Miller	Stadium: PGE Park; Attendance: 5,018; Referee: Cory Dean (USA)

June 22, 2004 A-L	Minnesota Thunder	0–1	Portland Timbers	Saint Paul, Minnesota
17:00 (PDT)		Report	31' Gordon	Stadium: James Griffin Stadium; Attendance: 2,213; Referee: Fotis Bazakos (USA)

June 23, 2004 A-L	Milwaukee Wave United	2–1	Portland Timbers	Milwaukee
17:30 (PDT)	Dombrowski 38'; Torres 61'; Marcantonio (red card) 90'	Report	17' Alvarez; (red card) 80' Wilkinson; (red card) 82' Morrison	Stadium: Uihlein Soccer Park; Attendance: 1,131; Referee: Ricardo Salazar (USA)

June 30, 2004 USOC 3rd Rd	Utah Blitzz (PSL)	1–2	Portland Timbers	Salt Lake City
18:30 (PDT)	Afash 65'	Report	33' Alvarez; 41' Bengard	Stadium: Rice-Eccles Stadium; Referee: Craig Burns (USA)

=== July ===
July 2, 2004 A-L / CC	Portland Timbers	0–2	Vancouver Whitecaps	Portland, Oregon
19:00 (PDT)		Report	10' Sulentic; 68' Jordan	Stadium: PGE Park; Attendance: 6,007; Referee: Yader Reyes (USA)

July 8, 2004 A-L	Portland Timbers	6–1	Edmonton Aviators	Portland, Oregon
19:00 (PDT)	Gordon 11', 49', 60'; Alvarez 72', 88'; Antoniuk 77'	Report	17' Fraser	Stadium: PGE Park; Attendance: 4,230; Referee: David Simon (USA)

July 14, 2004 USOC 4th Rd	Portland Timbers	0–3	San Jose Earthquakes (MLS)	Portland, Oregon
19:00 (PDT)	Wilkinson (red card) 17'	Report	18' (pen.) Ekelund; 55' Corrales; 80' De Rosario	Stadium: PGE Park; Attendance: 10,622; Referee: Richard Heron (USA)

July 16, 2004 A-L / CC	Vancouver Whitecaps	1–0	Portland Timbers	Burnaby, British Columbia Canada
19:00 (PDT)	Nash 56'	Report		Stadium: Swangard Stadium; Attendance: 4,492; Referee: Mark Budda (Canada)

July 17, 2004 A-L / CC	Seattle Sounders	3–4 (a.e.t.)	Portland Timbers	Seattle
19:00 (PDT)	Vélez 31', 61'; Scott (red card) 76'; Bolaños 81' (pen.)	Report	35' Morrison; 73' Gordon; 83' Alvarez; 110' Alcaraz-Cuellar	Stadium: Qwest Field; Attendance: 3,457; Referee: Brian D'Amato (USA)

July 20, 2004 A-L	Edmonton Aviators	0–1 (forfeit)	Portland Timbers	N/A
18:00 (PDT)		Report	(by forfeit)	Stadium: N/A; Attendance: N/A; Referee: N/A

July 24, 2004 A-L / CC	Portland Timbers	0–2	Seattle Sounders	Portland, Oregon
19:00 (PDT)		Report	42', 80' Levesque	Stadium: PGE Park; Attendance: 4,267; Referee: Ramon Hernandez (USA)

July 28, 2004 A-L	Calgary Mustangs	0–1	Portland Timbers	Calgary, Alberta Canada
18:00 (PDT)		Report	86' Gordon	Stadium: McMahon Stadium; Attendance: 1,374; Referee: Kevin Duliba (Canada)

July 31, 2004 A-L	Milwaukee Wave United	0–2	Portland Timbers	Milwaukee
17:30 (PDT)	Larkin (red card) 55'	Report	5' Alvarez; 9' Bengard	Stadium: Uihlein Soccer Park; Attendance: 1,569; Referee: Brent Sorg (USA)

=== August ===
August 5, 2004 A-L	Portland Timbers	3–0	Minnesota Thunder	Portland, Oregon
19:00 (PDT)	Gregor 11', 43'; Alvarez 55'	Report		Stadium: PGE Park; Attendance: 5,243; Referee: Sasha Mitelman (USA)

August 7, 2004 A-L	Edmonton F.C.^{[B]}	1–4	Portland Timbers	Edmonton, Alberta Canada
13:00 (PDT)	Vignjević 82'	Report	17' Gordon; 45', 66' Alvarez; 85' Afash	Stadium: Coronation Park; Attendance: 493; Referee: Michael Lambert (Canada)

August 8, 2004 A-L	Calgary Mustangs	1–1 (a.e.t.)	Portland Timbers	Calgary, Alberta Canada
13:00 (PDT)	Otta 27'	Report	72' Afash	Stadium: McMahon Stadium; Attendance: 550; Referee: Daniel Belleau (Canada)

August 12, 2004 A-L	Portland Timbers	2–1	Calgary Mustangs	Portland, Oregon
19:00 (PDT)	Bengard 39' (pen.); Afash 89'	Report	62' Brusselers	Stadium: PGE Park; Attendance: 5,377; Referee: Yader Reyes (USA)

August 14, 2004 A-L	Minnesota Thunder	2–2 (a.e.t.)	Portland Timbers	Saint Paul, Minnesota
17:00 (PDT)	Menyongar 63' (pen.); Tarley 71'; Jacquette (red card) 92'	Report	19' Alvarez; (red card) 60' Morrison; 86' Alcaraz-Cuellar	Stadium: James Griffin Stadium; Attendance: 5,018; Referee: Brian D'Amato (USA)

August 19, 2004 A-L	Portland Timbers	5–0	Puerto Rico Islanders	Portland, Oregon
19:00 (PDT)	Miranda 18'; Alvarez 39'; Alcaraz-Cuellar 64'; Benedetti 75'; Afash 90'	Report	(red card) 42' Gores	Stadium: PGE Park; Attendance: 6,523; Referee: Baldomero Toledo (USA)

August 27, 2004 A-L	Portland Timbers	0–0 (a.e.t.)	Minnesota Thunder	Portland, Oregon
20:00 (PDT)		Report		Stadium: PGE Park; Attendance: 6,287; Referee: David Simon (USA)

August 29, 2004 A-L	Portland Timbers	2–1	Milwaukee Wave United	Portland, Oregon
17:00 (PDT)	Alvarez 49'; Afash 77'	Report	(red card) 66' Marcantonio; 68' To. Dusosky	Stadium: PGE Park; Attendance: 7,833; Referee: Ramon Hernandez (USA)

== Postseason ==
September 1, 2004 Conf. SF 1	Portland Timbers	2–1	Seattle Sounders	Portland, Oregon
19:00 (PDT)	Alvarez 52'; Gregor 81' (pen.)	Report	17' Levesque; (red card) 79' Vélez	Stadium: PGE Park; Attendance: 4,863; Referee: Nathan Lacy (USA)

September 5, 2004 Conf. SF 2	Seattle Sounders	2–0 (a.e.t.) (3–2 agg.)	Portland Timbers	Seattle
19:00 (PDT)	Wélton 5' 100'	Report		Stadium: Qwest Field; Attendance: 3,490; Referee: Jair Marrufo (USA)

== Competitions ==
=== A-League ===
==== Western Conference standings ====
Conference Semifinal round of playoffs

Pos	Club	Pts	Pld	W	L	T	GF	GA	GD
1	Portland Timbers	57	28	18	7	3	58	30	+28
2	Vancouver Whitecaps	47	28	14	9	5	38	29	+9
3	Minnesota Thunder	45	28	13	9	6	33	23	+10
4	Seattle Sounders	43	28	13	11	4	40	34	+6
5	Milwaukee Wave United	40	28	12	12	4	44	48	−4
6	Calgary Mustangs	18	28	4	18	6	30	51	−21
7	Edmonton F.C.^{[B]}	18	28	4	18	6	19	56	−37

==== Results summary ====
Overall								Home						Away					
Pld	Pts	W	L	T	GF	GA	GD	W	L	T	GF	GA	GD	W	L	T	GF	GA	GD
28	57	18	7	3	58	30	+28	9	4	1	32	14	+18	9	3	2	26	16	+10

Pld = Matches played; Pts = Points; W = Matches won; T = Matches tied; L = Matches lost; GF = Goals for; GA = Goals against; GD = Goal difference

==== Results by round ====
Round	1	2	3	4	5	6	7	8	9	10	11	12	13	14	15	16	17	18	19	20	21	22	23	24	25	26	27	28
Stadium	H	H	A	A	H	A	A	H	H	H	A	A	H	H	A	A	A	H	A	A	H	A	A	H	A	H	H	H
Result	W	W	W	W	W	W	L	W	L	L	W	L	L	W	L	W	W	L	W	W	W	W	T	W	T	W	T	W

A = Away; H = Home; W = Win; L = Loss; T = Tie

=== A-League Playoffs ===
==== Playoff bracket ====
Conference Semifinals
1	Montreal Impact	1	1	2
8	Rochester Raging Rhinos	0	0	0
4	Syracuse Salty Dogs (aet) (p)	1	1	2 (5)
5	Richmond Kickers	0	2	2 (4)
2	Minnesota Thunder	0	0	0
7	Vancouver Whitecaps	2	1	3
3	Seattle Sounders (aet)	1	2	3
6	Portland Timbers	2	0	2

Conference Finals
Montreal Impact	2	1	3
Syracuse Salty Dogs	0	1	1
Vancouver Whitecaps	0	1	1
Seattle Sounders	1	1	2

Final
Montreal Impact
Seattle Sounders

==== Western Conference semifinals ====
September 1, 2004
19:00 (PDT)
Leg 1

Portland Timbers	2–1	Seattle Sounders
Alvarez 52'; Gregor 81' (pen.)	Report	17' Levesque; (red card) 79' Vélez

PGE Park
Attendance: 4,863
Referee: Nathan Lacy (USA)

September 1, 2004
19:00 (PDT)
Leg 2

Seattle Sounders	2–0 (a.e.t.)	Portland Timbers
Wélton 5' 100'	Report

Qwest Field
Attendance: 3,490
Referee: Jair Marrufo (USA)

=== U.S. Open Cup ===
==== Cup bracket ====
Third round
A-L	Minnesota Thunder (aet)	2
PDL	Boulder Rapids Reserve	1
PSL	Utah Blitzz	1
A-L	Portland Timbers	2

Fourth round
A-L	Minnesota Thunder	1
MLS	Los Angeles Galaxy	0
A-L	Portland Timbers	0
MLS	San Jose Earthquakes	3

Quarterfinals
A-L	Minnesota Thunder	2 (4)
MLS	San Jose Earthquakes (aet) (p)	2 (5)

==== Third round ====
June 30, 2004
18:30 (PDT)

Utah Blitzz (PSL)	1–2	Portland Timbers
Afash 65'	Report	33' Alvarez; 41' Bengard

Rice-Eccles Stadium
Referee: Craig Burns

==== Fourth round ====
July 14, 2004
19:00 (PDT)

Portland Timbers	0–3	San Jose Earthquakes (MLS)
Wilkinson (red card) 17'	Report	18' (pen.) Ekelund; 55' Corrales; 80' De Rosario

PGE Park
Attendance: 10,622
Referee: Richard Heron

=== Cascadia Cup ===
2004
Team	Pts	Pld	W	L	D	GF	GA	GD
Vancouver Whitecaps	13	8	4	3	1	7	6	+1
Portland Timbers	12	8	4	4	0	10	11	-1
Seattle Sounders	10	8	3	4	1	9	9	0

== Club ==
=== Coaching staff ===
Position	Staff
Head coach	(England) Bobby Howe
Assistant coach	(Republic of Ireland) Jimmy Conway
Goalkeeper coach	(United States) Jim Brazeau
Athletic Trainer	(United States) Tony Guyette
Strength and conditioning Coach	(United States) Carl Davison

=== Management ===
Owner	Portland Family Entertainment (to April 2); Pacific Coast League (from April 2)
President	(United States) Mark Schuster (to April 2) (United States) Tom Lasley (interim; from April 2)
General Manager	(United States) Jim Taylor
Ground (capacity and dimensions)	PGE Park ( / )

=== Staff recognition ===
A-League Coach of the Year

Coach	W	L	T	League	Playoffs
(England) Bobby Howe	18	7	3	1st	Conference Semifinals

A-League Co-Executive of the Year

Executive	Avg. Att.	Club honors
(United States) Jim Taylor	5,281	Commissioner's Cup^{[A]}

== Squad ==
=== Kits ===
Home	Away

=== Final roster ===
Note: Flags indicate national team as defined under FIFA eligibility rules; some limited exceptions apply. Players may hold more than one non-FIFA nationality.

No.	Pos.	Nation	Player
1	GK	USA	Bayard Elfvin
2	MF	USA	Erik Cronkrite
4	DF	USA	David Henning
5	DF	NZL	Gavin Wilkinson
6	MF	USA	Memo Arzate
7	MF	MEX	Hugo Alcaraz-Cuellar
8	MF	USA	Alex Bengard
10	FW	SYR	Fadi Afash
11	MF	USA	Brian Winters
12	MF	USA	Andrew Gregor
13	DF	SLV	Edwin Miranda
14	MF	USA	Scott Benedetti

No.	Pos.	Nation	Player
15	FW	MEX	Byron Alvarez
17	DF	USA	Scot Thompson (on loan from Los Angeles Galaxy)
20	MF	USA	Jake Sagare
21	FW	USA	Alan Gordon
22	FW	USA	Dan Antoniuk
23	DF	USA	Aaron Heinzen
24	DF	USA	Lee Morrison
30	GK	USA	Josh Saunders
31	DF	USA	Shawn Saunders
32	MF	USA	Garrett Marcum
—	MF	USA	Jarrod Weis

=== Player recognition ===
A-League Rookie of the Year

Pos	Player
FW	(United States) Alan Gordon

A-League Goal Scoring Co-Champion

Player	GP	G
(United States) Alan Gordon	27	17

A-League Assist Leader

Player	GP	A
(Mexico) Hugo Alcaraz-Cuellar	26	10

A-League All-League First Team

Pos	Player	GP
FW	(Mexico) Byron Alvarez	25
FW	(United States) Alan Gordon	27

A-League All-League Second Team

Pos	Player	GP
MF	(Mexico) Hugo Alcaraz-Cuellar	26

A-League Player of the Week

Week	Player	Opponent(s)
6	(United States) Alan Gordon	Vancouver Whitecaps
7	(United States) Alan Gordon	Milwaukee Wave United
9	(Mexico) Byron Alvarez	Edmonton Aviators, Vancouver Whitecaps
13	(United States) Alan Gordon	Edmonton Aviators

A-League Team of the Week

Week	Player	Opponent(s)	Ref
3	(United States) Alan Gordon	Seattle Sounders	
3	(New Zealand) Gavin Wilkinson	Seattle Sounders	
5	(United States) Jake Sagare	Calgary Mustangs, Seattle Sounders	
5	(United States) Josh Saunders	Calgary Mustangs, Seattle Sounders	
6	(Mexico) Hugo Alcaraz-Cuellar	Vancouver Whitecaps	
6	(United States) Alan Gordon	Vancouver Whitecaps	
7	(United States) Alan Gordon	Milwaukee Wave United	
7	(United States) Aaron Heinzen	Milwaukee Wave United	
9	(Mexico) Byron Alvarez	Edmonton Aviators, Vancouver Whitecaps	
13	(United States) Alan Gordon	Edmonton Aviators	
14	(Mexico) Hugo Alcaraz-Cuellar	Vancouver Whitecaps, Seattle Sounders	
14	(United States) Lee Morrison	Vancouver Whitecaps, Seattle Sounders	
16	(El Salvador) Edwin Miranda	Calgary Mustangs, Milwaukee Wave United	
17	(Mexico) Byron Alvarez	Minnesota Thunder, Edmonton F.C., Calgary Mustangs	
17	(United States) Andrew Gregor	Minnesota Thunder, Edmonton F.C., Calgary Mustangs	
18	(Mexico) Hugo Alcaraz-Cuellar	Calgary Mustangs, Minnesota Thunder	
19	(United States) Scott Benedetti	Puerto Rico Islanders	
20	(United States) Scot Thompson	Minnesota Thunder, Milwaukee Wave United	

=== Statistics ===
==== Appearances and goals ====
All players contracted to the club during the season included.

No.	Pos	Nat	Player	Total		A-League		Playoffs		U.S. Open Cup	
No.	Pos	Nat	Player	Apps	Goals	Apps	Goals	Apps	Goals	Apps	Goals
1	GK	(United States) USA	Bayard Elfvin	4	0	3+1	0	0+0	0	0+0	0
2	MF	(United States) USA	Erik Cronkrite	3	0	0+3	0	0+0	0	0+0	0
4	DF	(United States) USA	David Henning	12	0	9+3	0	0+0	0	0+0	0
5	DF	(New Zealand) NZL	Gavin Wilkinson	27	0	22+1	0	2+0	0	2+0	0
6	MF	(United States) USA	Memo Arzate	3	0	0+3	0	0+0	0	0+0	0
7	MF	(Mexico) MEX	Hugo Alcaraz-Cuellar	30	5	24+2	5	2+0	0	2+0	0
8	MF	(United States) USA	Alex Bengard	26	6	23+1	5	0+0	0	2+0	1
(9)	FW	(United States) USA	McKinley Tennyson (released)	0	0	0+0	0	0+0	0	0+0	0
10	FW	(Syria) SYR	Fadi Afash	12	5	0+10	5	0+2	0	0+0	0
(10)	MF	(United States) USA	Jarrod Weis (not assigned a kit number after Afash signing)	1	0	0+1	0	0+0	0	0+0	0
11	MF	(United States) USA	Brian Winters	26	0	20+2	0	2+0	0	2+0	0
12	MF	(United States) USA	Andrew Gregor	17	3	11+2	2	2+0	1	1+1	0
13	DF	(El Salvador) SLV	Edwin Miranda	17	1	8+6	1	2+0	0	0+1	0
14	MF	(United States) USA	Scott Benedetti	22	1	16+5	1	0+0	0	1+0	0
15	FW	(Mexico) MEX	Byron Alvarez	29	18	23+2	16	2+0	1	2+0	1
17	DF	(United States) USA	Scot Thompson	16	0	12+1	0	2+0	0	0+1	0
20	MF	(United States) USA	Jake Sagare	29	1	25+0	1	2+0	0	2+0	0
21	FW	(United States) USA	Alan Gordon	31	17	26+1	17	2+0	0	2+0	0
22	FW	(United States) USA	Dan Antoniuk	19	3	2+15	3	0+0	0	0+2	0
23	DF	(United States) USA	Aaron Heinzen	14	0	13+0	0	0+0	0	1+0	0
24	DF	(United States) USA	Lee Morrison	28	1	24+0	1	2+0	0	2+0	0
30	GK	(United States) USA	Josh Saunders	28	0	24+0	0	2+0	0	2+0	0
31	DF	(United States) USA	Shawn Saunders	14	0	12+1	0	0+0	0	1+0	0
32	MF	(United States) USA	Garrett Marcum	0	0	0+0	0	0+0	0	0+0	0

==== Top scorers ====
Players with 1 goal or more included only.

Rk.	Nat.	Position	Player	Total	A-League	Playoffs	U.S. Open Cup
1	(Mexico)	FW	Byron Alvarez	18	16	1	1
2	(United States)	FW	Alan Gordon	17	17	0	0
3	(United States)	MF	Alex Bengard	6	5	0	1
4	(Syria)	FW	Fadi Afash	5	5	0	0
4	(Mexico)	MF	Hugo Alcaraz-Cuellar	5	5	0	0
6	(United States)	FW	Dan Antoniuk	3	3	0	0
6	(United States)	MF	Andrew Gregor	3	2	1	0
8	(United States)	MF	Scott Benedetti	1	1	0	0
8	(El Salvador)	DF	Edwin Miranda	1	1	0	0
8	(United States)	DF	Lee Morrison	1	1	0	0
8	(United States)	MF	Jake Sagare	1	1	0	0
			GOALS BY FORFEIT	1	1	0	0
			TOTALS	62	58	2	2

==== Disciplinary record ====
Players with 1 card or more included only.

No.	Nat.	Position	Player	Total		A-League		Playoffs		U.S. Open Cup	
No.	Nat.	Position	Player	Booked	Sent off (straight red)	Booked	Sent off (straight red)	Booked	Sent off (straight red)	Booked	Sent off (straight red)
1	(United States)	GK	Bayard Elfvin	2	0	2	0	0	0	0	0
4	(United States)	DF	David Henning	1	0	1	0	0	0	0	0
5	(New Zealand)	DF	Gavin Wilkinson	7	2	7	1	0	0	0	1
7	(Mexico)	MF	Hugo Alcaraz-Cuellar	3	0	3	0	0	0	0	0
8	(United States)	MF	Alex Bengard	2	0	2	0	0	0	0	0
11	(United States)	MF	Brian Winters	4	0	3	0	1	0	0	0
12	(United States)	MF	Andrew Gregor	3	0	3	0	0	0	0	0
13	(El Salvador)	DF	Edwin Miranda	2	0	2	0	0	0	0	0
14	(United States)	MF	Scott Benedetti	1	0	1	0	0	0	0	0
15	(Mexico)	FW	Byron Alvarez	5	1	4	1	1	0	0	0
20	(United States)	MF	Jake Sagare	4	0	4	0	0	0	0	0
21	(United States)	FW	Alan Gordon	3	0	3	0	0	0	0	0
22	(United States)	FW	Dan Antoniuk	1	0	1	0	0	0	0	0
23	(United States)	DF	Aaron Heinzen	1	0	1	0	0	0	0	0
24	(United States)	DF	Lee Morrison	3	2	3	2	0	0	0	0
31	(United States)	DF	Shawn Saunders	5	0	5	0	0	0	0	0
			TOTALS	47	5	45	4	2	0	0	1

==== Goalkeeper stats ====
All goalkeepers included.

No.	Nat.	Player	Total				A-League				Playoffs				U.S. Open Cup			
No.	Nat.	Player	MIN	GA	GAA	SV	MIN	GA	GAA	SV	MIN	GA	GAA	SV	MIN	GA	GAA	SV
1	(United States)	Bayard Elfvin	320	3	0.84	16	320	3	0.84	16	0	0	—	0	0	0	—	0
30	(United States)	Josh Saunders	2566	34	1.19	119	2196	27	1.11	104	190	3	1.42	7	180	4	2.00	8
		TOTALS	2886	37	1.15	135	2516	30	1.07	120	190	3	1.42	7	180	4	2.00	8

=== Player movement ===
==== Transfers in ====
Date	Player	Position	Previous club	Fee/notes	Ref
March 11, 2004	(United States) Josh Saunders	GK	(United States) San Jose Earthquakes	Free	
March 31, 2004	(United States) Bayard Elfvin (R)	GK	(United States) Ashland Eagles	Free	
April 8, 2004	(United States) Alex Bengard	MF	(United States) Seattle Sounders	Free	
April 8, 2004	(United States) Alan Gordon (R)	FW	(United States) Oregon State Beavers	A-League College Player Draft, 1st round	
April 12, 2004	(United States) Jake Sagare	MF	(England) Halifax Town	Free	
April 30, 2004	(United States) Memo Arzate (R)	MF	(United States) UC Santa Barbara Gauchos	Free	
April 30, 2004	(United States) David Henning	DF	(United States) Des Moines Menace	Free	
April 30, 2004	(United States) Erik Cronkrite (R)	MF	(United States) Portland Pilots	Free	
April 30, 2004	(El Salvador) Edwin Miranda (R)	DF	(United States) Cal State Northridge Matadors	Free	
April 30, 2004	(United States) Shawn Saunders	DF	(United States) Orange County Blue Star	Free	
May 2004	(United States) Jarrod Weis (R)	MF	(United States) Portland Pilots	Free	
May 2004	(United States) Garrett Marcum (R)	MF	(United States) Portland Pilots	Free	
June 10, 2004	(United States) Andrew Gregor	MF	(Canada) Vancouver Whitecaps	Free	
July 27, 2004	(Syria) Fadi Afash	FW	(United States) Utah Blitzz	Free	

==== Loans in ====
Date	Player	Position	Previous club	Fee/notes	Ref
July 8, 2004	(United States) Scot Thompson	DF	(United States) Los Angeles Galaxy	Season-long loan with option to recall; recalled by Los Angeles Galaxy for September 4 game vs. Columbus Crew; returned to Portland following the game	

==== Transfers out ====
Date	Player	Position	Destination club	Fee/notes	Ref
End of 2003 season	(Syria) Fadi Afash	FW	N/A	Contract expired and not re-signed	
End of 2003 season	(United States) Manuel Brasil	MF	N/A	Contract expired and not re-signed	
End of 2003 season	(United States) Cole Burgman	GK	N/A	Contract expired and not re-signed	
End of 2003 season	(United States) Jason Melendez	MF	N/A	Contract expired and not re-signed	
End of 2003 season	(United States) Bryn Ritchie	DF	N/A	Contract expired and not re-signed	
End of 2003 season	(United States) Jake Sagare	MF	N/A	Contract expired and not re-signed	
April 14, 2004	(United States) Adam Wilson	MF	Unattached	Released	
April 14, 2004	(United States) Ryan Youngblood	MF	Unattached	Released	
May 25, 2004	(United States) McKinley Tennyson	FW	Unattached	Released	

==== Loans out ====
Date	Player	Position	Destination club	Fee/notes	Ref
September 11, 2004	(United States) Alan Gordon	FW	(United States) Los Angeles Galaxy	Season-long loan; sold to Los Angeles Galaxy on November 30	

==== Unsigned draft picks ====
Date	Player	Position	Previous club	Notes	Ref
December 17, 2003	(United States) Leonard Griffin	DF	(United States) UCLA Bruins (United States) Orange County Blue Star	A-League College Player Draft, 2nd round	

== Notes ==
- ^ ^{a} ^{b} The Commissioner's Cup was first created in 1991 to honor the American Professional Soccer League regular season champion and was awarded through the 1996 season. It was revived in 2005 to honor the USL First Division regular season champion and was awarded retroactively to the teams which had amassed the most points in previous A-League seasons from 1997 to 2004. The Commissioner's Cup is currently given to the USL Pro regular season champion.
- ^ ^{a} ^{b} The United Soccer Leagues took over operations of the Edmonton Aviators following financial troubles by the ownership group and the team finished the season as Edmonton Football Club.
