= 2003 Portland Timbers season =

Portland Timbers
2003 season
- President: Mark Schuster
- Head coach: Bobby Howe
- Stadium: PGE Park; Portland, Oregon
- A-League: Division: 3rd Playoffs: Did not qualify
- U.S. Open Cup: Qualification series
- Top goalscorer: Byron Alvarez (12 goals)
- Highest home attendance: 13,351 vs. ELP (Aug 29)
- Lowest home attendance: 2,772 vs. CGY (May 14)
- Average home league attendance: 5,871
Home colors	Away colors

The 2003 Portland Timbers season was the 3rd season for the Portland Timbers—the 3rd incarnation of a club to bear the Timbers name—of the now-defunct A-League, the second-tier league of the United States and Canada at the time.

== Preseason ==
=== Canterbury Cup ===
April 26, 2003 Semifinals	Yakima Reds	1–5	Portland Timbers	Abbotsford, British Columbia Canada
17:30 (PDT)	Auckland 38'	Report	7' (pen.) Benedetti; 16' Antoniuk; 72' Afash; 85' Melendez; 89' Downing	Stadium: Rotary Stadium; Attendance: 1,125; Referee: Bogdan Botoi (Canada)

April 27, 2003 Final	Vancouver Whitecaps	2–2 (4–2 p)	Portland Timbers	Abbotsford, British Columbia Canada
19:00 (PDT)	Gbeke 26'; Thompson 46'	Report	47' Ritchie; 61' Benedetti; (red card) 89' Alcaraz-Cuellar	Stadium: Rotary Stadium; Referee: Gerry Proctor (Canada)
	Penalties
	Robson (penalty scored); Heald (penalty scored); Chin (penalty scored); King (penalty scored)		(penalty scored) Downing; (penalty missed) Winters; (penalty scored) Morrison; (penalty missed) Brasil

== Regular season ==
=== May ===
May 1, 2003 A-L / Qual	Portland Timbers	0–1	Seattle Sounders	Portland, Oregon
19:00 (PDT)		Report	35' Smith	Stadium: PGE Park; Attendance: 5,993; Referee: Eduardo Irigoyen (USA)

May 2, 2003 A-L / Qual	Seattle Sounders	2–0	Portland Timbers	Seattle
20:00 (PDT)	Smith 78'; Callahan 80'	Report		Stadium: Seahawks Stadium; Attendance: 5,017; Referee: Terry Vaughn (USA)

May 11, 2003 A-L	Vancouver Whitecaps	2–1	Portland Timbers	Burnaby, British Columbia Canada
19:00 (PDT)	Jordan 11'; Morris 65'	Report	54' Afash	Stadium: Swangard Stadium; Attendance: 4,124; Referee: Bruce Primeau (Canada)

May 12, 2003 A-L	Calgary Storm	0–1	Portland Timbers	Calgary, Alberta Canada
17:30 (PDT)		Report	43' Afash	Stadium: Foothills Stadium; Attendance: 250; Referee: Gerry Proctor (Canada)

May 14, 2003 A-L	Portland Timbers	4–1	Calgary Storm	Portland, Oregon
19:00 (PDT)	Afash 1'; Tennyson 7', 45'; Melendez 80'	Report	36' Korthuis	Stadium: PGE Park; Attendance: 2,772; Referee: Mohammad Zarrabi (USA)

May 18, 2003 A-L	Seattle Sounders	1–0	Portland Timbers	Seattle
17:00 (PDT)	Vélez 15'	Report		Stadium: Seahawks Stadium; Attendance: 3,945; Referee: Marcel Yonan (USA)

May 25, 2003 A-L	Calgary Storm	2–1	Portland Timbers	Calgary, Alberta Canada
17:00 (PDT)	Chala 30'; Korthuis 45'	Report	2' Tennyson	Stadium: Foothills Stadium; Attendance: 500; Referee: Kevin Duliba (Canada)

May 27, 2003 A-L	Portland Timbers	0–3	Minnesota Thunder	Portland, Oregon
19:00 (PDT)	Alcaraz-Cuellar (red card) 64'	Report	31' Ferruzzi; 40' Torres; 76' Menyongar	Stadium: PGE Park; Attendance: 3,101; Referee: Ramón Hernández (USA)

May 29, 2003 A-L	Portland Timbers	1–0	Vancouver Whitecaps	Portland, Oregon
19:00 (PDT)	Alvarez 74'	Report		Stadium: PGE Park; Attendance: 4,817; Referee: Calin Znamirovschi (USA)

=== June ===
June 7, 2003 A-L	El Paso Patriots	1–3	Portland Timbers	El Paso, Texas
18:30 (PDT)	Cervantes 7'	Report	67' (pen.) Tennyson; 70' Alvarez; 88' Antoniuk	Stadium: Sun Bowl Stadium; Attendance: 607; Referee: Ryan Keck (USA)

June 8, 2003 A-L	Milwaukee Wave United	4–0	Portland Timbers	Milwaukee
14:00 (PDT)	To. Dusosky 6'; Dombrowski 22'; Delevski 33', 36'	Report	(red card) 88' Sagare	Stadium: Uihlein Soccer Park; Attendance: 1,154; Referee: Kelly Ross (USA)

June 12, 2003 A-L	Portland Timbers	2–1 (a.e.t.)	Vancouver Whitecaps	Portland, Oregon
19:00 (PDT)	Alvarez 9'; Tennyson 95'	Report	60' Heald	Stadium: PGE Park; Attendance: 5,471; Referee: Brian Hall (USA)

June 27, 2003 A-L	Portland Timbers	1–0 (a.e.t.)	Calgary Storm	Portland, Oregon
19:00 (PDT)	Wilkinson (red card) 75'; Alvarez 92'	Report		Stadium: PGE Park; Attendance: 5,419; Referee: Padman Senthirajah (USA)

June 29, 2003 A-L	Calgary Storm	0–2	Portland Timbers	Calgary, Alberta Canada
14:00 (PDT)		Report	47' Tennyson; 83' (pen.) Afash	Stadium: Foothills Stadium; Attendance: 1,600; Referee: Paul Ward (Canada)

=== July ===
July 1, 2003 A-L	Vancouver Whitecaps	1–0	Portland Timbers	Burnaby, British Columbia Canada
19:00 (PDT)	Dailly 90'	Report		Stadium: Swangard Stadium; Attendance: 3,119; Referee: Arnar Bernhardsson (Canada)

July 3, 2003 A-L	Portland Timbers	3–0	Vancouver Whitecaps	Portland, Oregon
19:00 (PDT)	Alvarez 72', 81', 90'	Report		Stadium: PGE Park; Attendance: 6,619; Referee: David Simon (USA)

July 11, 2003 A-L	Portland Timbers	3–2	El Paso Patriots	Portland, Oregon
19:00 (PDT)	Alcaraz-Cuellar 22'; Morrison 45'; Heinzen 78'	Report	38', 49' Andrade de Souza	Stadium: PGE Park; Attendance: 4,959; Referee: Ricardo Valenzuela (USA)

July 13, 2003 A-L	Portland Timbers	4–3	Milwaukee Wave United	Portland, Oregon
17:00 (PDT)	Alvarez 18', 90'; Tennyson 25', 48'	Report	16' Timbers; 57' (red card) 85' Ball; 83' Dombrowski	Stadium: PGE Park; Attendance: 3,901; Referee: David Simon (USA)

July 23, 2003 A-L	Cincinnati Riverhawks	1–2 (a.e.t.)	Portland Timbers	Wilder, Kentucky
16:05 (PDT)	Eller 55'	Report	80' Tennyson; 99' Sagare	Stadium: Town & Country Sports Complex; Attendance: 324; Referee: Hilario Grajeda (USA)

July 25, 2003 A-L	Minnesota Thunder	1–0 (a.e.t.)	Portland Timbers	Blaine, Minnesota
17:30 (PDT)	Magee 92'	Report		Stadium: National Sports Center; Attendance: 7,568; Referee: Marcel Yonan (USA)

July 27, 2003 A-L	Portland Timbers	1–1 (a.e.t.)	Team Calgary^{[A]}	Portland, Oregon
17:00 (PDT)	Wilkinson 33'	Report	8' Reyes	Stadium: PGE Park; Attendance: 4,261

=== August ===
August 9, 2003 A-L	Portland Timbers	0–1	Seattle Sounders	Portland, Oregon
19:00 (PDT)		Report	28' Smith	Stadium: PGE Park; Attendance: 6,831; Referee: Richard Heron (USA)

August 10, 2003 A-L	Seattle Sounders	1–3	Portland Timbers	Seattle
14:00 (PDT)	Vélez 59'	Report	7' Tennyson; 69', 81' Alvarez	Stadium: Seahawks Stadium; Attendance: 2,990; Referee: Jair Marrufo (USA)

August 15, 2003 A-L	Portland Timbers	1–0	Indiana Blast	Portland, Oregon
19:00 (PDT)	Wilkinson 90'	Report		Stadium: PGE Park; Attendance: 7,104; Referee: Mohammad Zarrabi (USA)

August 17, 2003 A-L	Vancouver Whitecaps	1–1 (a.e.t.)	Portland Timbers	Burnaby, British Columbia Canada
19:00 (PDT)	Valente 61'	Report	47' Sagare; (red card) 81' Benedetti	Stadium: Swangard Stadium; Attendance: 5,113; Referee: Bruce Primeau (Canada)

August 18, 2003 A-L	Portland Timbers	1–0	Seattle Sounders	Portland, Oregon
19:00 (PDT)	Sagare 55'	Report		Stadium: PGE Park; Attendance: 6,329; Referee: Kevin Stott (USA)

August 23, 2003 A-L	El Paso Patriots	3–1	Portland Timbers	El Paso, Texas
18:30 (PDT)	Andrade de Souza 17', 83'; Griego 23'	Report	73' Alvarez	Stadium: Dudley Field; Attendance: 1,735; Referee: Jesse Johnson (USA)

August 29, 2003 A-L	Portland Timbers	3–0	El Paso Patriots	Portland, Oregon
19:00 (PDT)	Ritchie 18'; Benedetti 58'; Sagare 84'	Report		Stadium: PGE Park; Attendance: 13,351

== Competitions ==
=== A-League ===
==== Western Conference, Pacific Division standings ====
Division Final round of playoffs

Pos	Club	Pts	Pld	W	L	T	GF	GA	GD
1	Seattle Sounders	53	28	16	7	5	45	24	+21
2	Vancouver Whitecaps	52	28	15	6	7	45	24	+21
3	Portland Timbers	47	28	15	11	2	39	33	+6
4	Team Calgary^{[A]}	15	28	4	21	3	16	62	−46

==== Results summary ====
Overall								Home						Away					
Pld	Pts	W	L	T	GF	GA	GD	W	L	T	GF	GA	GD	W	L	T	GF	GA	GD
28	47	15	11	2	39	33	+6	10	3	1	24	13	+11	5	8	1	15	20	−5

Pld = Matches played; Pts = Points; W = Matches won; T = Matches tied; L = Matches lost; GF = Goals for; GA = Goals against; GD = Goal difference

==== Results by round ====
Round	1	2	3	4	5	6	7	8	9	10	11	12	13	14	15	16	17	18	19	20	21	22	23	24	25	26	27	28
Stadium	H	A	A	A	H	A	A	H	H	A	A	H	H	A	A	H	H	H	A	A	H	H	A	H	A	H	A	H
Result	L	L	L	W	W	L	L	L	W	W	L	W	W	W	L	W	W	W	W	L	T	L	W	W	T	W	L	W

A = Away; H = Home; W = Win; L = Loss; T = Tie

== Club ==
=== Coaching staff ===
Position	Staff
Head coach	(England) Bobby Howe
Assistant coach	(Republic of Ireland) Jimmy Conway
Goalkeeper coach	(United States) Jim Brazeau
Athletic trainer	(United States) Tony Guyette
Strength and conditioning Coach	(United States) Carl Davison

=== Management ===
Owner	Portland Family Entertainment^{[B]}
President	(United States) Mark Schuster
General Manager	(United States) Jim Taylor
Ground (capacity and dimensions)	PGE Park ( / )

== Squad ==
=== Kits ===
Home	Away

=== Final roster ===
Note: Flags indicate national team as defined under FIFA eligibility rules; some limited exceptions apply. Players may hold more than one non-FIFA nationality.

No.	Pos.	Nation	Player
4	DF	USA	Bryn Ritchie
5	DF	NZL	Gavin Wilkinson
6	MF	USA	Manuel Brasil
7	MF	MEX	Hugo Alcaraz-Cuellar
8	MF	USA	Jason Melendez
9	FW	USA	McKinley Tennyson
10	FW	SYR	Fadi Afash
11	MF	USA	Brian Winters
13	DF	USA	Ryan Youngblood
14	MF	USA	Scott Benedetti

No.	Pos.	Nation	Player
15	FW	MEX	Byron Alvarez
18	MF	USA	Adam Wilson
19	DF	USA	Nick Downing (on loan from New England Revolution)
20	MF	USA	Jake Sagare
21	GK	USA	Cole Burgman
22	FW	USA	Dan Antoniuk
23	DF	USA	Aaron Heinzen
24	DF	USA	Lee Morrison
30	GK	USA	Josh Saunders (on loan from San Jose Earthquakes)

=== Recognition ===
A-League All-League Second Team

Pos	Player	GP
FW	(Mexico) Byron Alvarez	21

A-League Player of the Week

Week	Player	Opponent(s)
12	(Mexico) Byron Alvarez	Vancouver Whitecaps (x2)

A-League Team of the Week

Week	Player	Opponent(s)	Ref
5	(United States) McKinley Tennyson	Calgary Storm, Seattle Sounders	
7	(Mexico) Byron Alvarez	Vancouver Whitecaps	
11	(Mexico) Byron Alvarez	Calgary Storm (x2)	
11	(United States) Josh Saunders	Calgary Storm (x2)	
12	(Mexico) Byron Alvarez	Vancouver Whitecaps (x2)	
13	(Mexico) Hugo Alcaraz-Cuellar	El Paso Patriots, Milwaukee Wave United	
13	(Mexico) Byron Alvarez	El Paso Patriots, Milwaukee Wave United	
17	(Mexico) Byron Alvarez	Seattle Sounders (x2)	
18	(New Zealand) Gavin Wilkinson	Indiana Blast, Vancouver Whitecaps, Seattle Sounders	
20	(United States) Scott Benedetti	El Paso Patriots	
20	(United States) Bryn Ritchie	El Paso Patriots	

=== Statistics ===
==== Appearances and goals ====
All players contracted to the club during the season included.

No.	Pos	Nat	Player	Total		A-League	
No.	Pos	Nat	Player	Apps	Goals	Apps	Goals
(1)	GK	(United States) USA	Curtis Spiteri (released)	10	0	10+0	0
4	DF	(United States) USA	Bryn Ritchie (began season wearing kit number 2)	18	1	10+8	1
(4)	MF	(United States) USA	Jake Vaughn (released)	6	0	1+5	0
5	DF	(New Zealand) NZL	Gavin Wilkinson	22	2	22+0	2
6	MF	(United States) USA	Manuel Brasil	10	0	7+3	0
7	MF	(Mexico) MEX	Hugo Alcaraz-Cuellar	27	1	27+0	1
8	MF	(United States) USA	Jason Melendez	18	1	11+7	1
9	FW	(United States) USA	McKinley Tennyson	28	11	24+4	11
10	FW	(Syria) SYR	Fadi Afash	21	4	14+7	4
11	MF	(United States) USA	Brian Winters	28	0	28+0	0
13	DF	(United States) USA	Ryan Youngblood	6	0	1+5	0
14	MF	(United States) USA	Scott Benedetti	25	1	25+0	1
15	FW	(Mexico) MEX	Byron Alvarez	21	12	12+9	12
18	MF	(United States) USA	Adam Wilson	3	0	0+3	0
19	DF	(United States) USA	Nick Downing	26	0	24+2	0
20	MF	(United States) USA	Jake Sagare	20	4	20+0	4
21	GK	(United States) USA	Cole Burgman	2	0	2+0	0
22	FW	(United States) USA	Dan Antoniuk	20	1	4+16	1
23	DF	(United States) USA	Aaron Heinzen	27	0	27+0	0
24	DF	(United States) USA	Lee Morrison	24	1	23+1	1
30	GK	(United States) USA	Josh Saunders	16	0	16+0	0
(—)	DF	(Trinidad and Tobago) TRI	Brent Sancho (transferred to (Scotland) Dundee)	0	0	0+0	0

==== Top scorers ====
Players with 1 goal or more included only.

Rk.	Nat.	Position	Player	Total	A-League
1	(Mexico)	FW	Byron Alvarez	12	12
2	(United States)	FW	McKinley Tennyson	11	11
3	(Syria)	FW	Fadi Afash	4	4
3	(United States)	MF	Jake Sagare	4	4
5	(New Zealand)	DF	Gavin Wilkinson	2	2
6	(Mexico)	MF	Hugo Alcaraz-Cuellar	1	1
6	(United States)	FW	Dan Antoniuk	1	1
6	(United States)	MF	Scott Benedetti	1	1
6	(United States)	MF	Jason Melendez	1	1
6	(United States)	DF	Lee Morrison	1	1
6	(United States)	DF	Bryn Ritchie	1	1
			TOTALS	39	39

==== Disciplinary record ====
Players with 1 card or more included only.

No.	Nat.	Position	Player	Total		A-League	
No.	Nat.	Position	Player	Booked	Sent off (straight red)	Booked	Sent off (straight red)
4	(United States)	DF	Bryn Ritchie	5	0	5	0
5	(New Zealand)	DF	Gavin Wilkinson	6	1	6	1
6	(United States)	MF	Manuel Brasil	1	0	1	0
7	(Mexico)	MF	Hugo Alcaraz-Cuellar	4	1	4	1
8	(United States)	MF	Jason Melendez	1	0	1	0
9	(United States)	FW	McKinley Tennyson	4	0	4	0
10	(Syria)	FW	Fadi Afash	3	0	3	0
11	(United States)	MF	Brian Winters	5	0	5	0
14	(United States)	MF	Scott Benedetti	4	1	4	1
15	(Mexico)	FW	Byron Alvarez	2	0	2	0
19	(United States)	DF	Nick Downing	4	0	4	0
20	(United States)	MF	Jake Sagare	0	1	0	1
23	(United States)	DF	Aaron Heinzen	6	0	6	0
24	(United States)	DF	Lee Morrison	2	0	2	0
			TOTALS	47	4	47	4

==== Goalkeeper stats ====
All goalkeepers included.

No.	Nat.	Player	Total				A-League			
No.	Nat.	Player	MIN	GA	GAA	SV	MIN	GA	GAA	SV
(1)	(United States)	Curtis Spiteri	905	17	1.69	38	905	17	1.69	38
21	(United States)	Cole Burgman	180	1	0.50	9	180	1	0.50	9
30	(United States)	Josh Saunders	1493	15	0.90	58	1493	15	0.90	58
		TOTALS	2578	33	1.15	105	2578	33	1.15	105

=== Player movement ===
==== Transfers in ====
Date	Player	Position	Previous club	Fee/notes	Ref
April 1, 2003	(United States) Dan Antoniuk (R)	FW	(United States) Wheaton Lyons	Free	
April 1, 2003	(United States) Jason Melendez (R)	MF	(United States) UNLV Rebels	Free	
April 1, 2003	(United States) Lee Morrison	DF	(United States) Dallas Burn	Free	
April 1, 2003	(United States) Curtis Spiteri (R)	GK	(United States) Portland Pilots	A-League College Player Draft, 2nd round	
April 1, 2003	(United States) Jake Vaughn	MF	Unattached	Free	
April 1, 2003	(United States) Adam Wilson	MF	(United States) Hershey Wildcats	Free	
April 4, 2003	(United States) Cole Burgman	GK	(United States) Atlanta Silverbacks	Free	
April 2003	(Mexico) Byron Alvarez	FW	(United States) MetroStars	Signed amateur contract due to complications acquiring a P-1 visa; played entire 2003 season without pay	
May 27, 2003	(United States) Jake Sagare	MF	(England) Grimsby Town	Free	

==== Loans in ====
Date	Player	Position	Parent Club	Fee/notes	Ref
April 14, 2003	(United States) Nick Downing	DF	(United States) New England Revolution	Season-long loan	
June 25, 2003	(United States) Josh Saunders	GK	(United States) San Jose Earthquakes	Season-long loan	

==== Transfers out ====
Date	Player	Position	Destination club	Fee/notes	Ref
End of 2002 season	(United States) Chugger Adair	FW	N/A	Contract expired and not re-signed	
End of 2002 season	(England) Sean McAuley	DF	N/A	Contract expired and not re-signed	
End of 2002 season	(United States) Jake Sagare	MF	N/A	Contract expired and not re-signed	
January 22, 2003	(United States) Greg Howes	FW	Unattached	Released	
January 24, 2003	(United States) Matt Napoleon	GK	Unattached	Retired	
April 2, 2003	(Kyrgyzstan) Vadim Tolstolutsky	FW	Unattached	Retired	
April 8, 2003	(United States) Chris Smith	GK	Unattached	Released	
April 14, 2003	(Republic of Ireland) Keith Costigan	DF	Unattached	Released	
April 14, 2003	(United States) Erik Ozimek	MF	Unattached	Released	
April 14, 2003	(United States) Ben Somoza	MF	Unattached	Released	
June 9, 2003	(United States) Jake Vaughn	MF	Unattached	Released	
July 1, 2003	(United States) Curtis Spiteri	GK	Unattached	Released	
August 7, 2003	(Trinidad and Tobago) Brent Sancho	DF	(Scotland) Dundee	Undisclosed fee	

==== Loans out ====
Date	Player	Position	Destination club	Fee/notes	Ref
September 13, 2002	(Trinidad and Tobago) Brent Sancho	DF	(Trinidad and Tobago) San Juan Jabloteh	Season-long loan; allowed to tour with the Trinidad and Tobago national football team following San Juan Jabloteh's season; subsequently sold to Dundee	

==== Unsigned draft picks ====
Date	Player	Position	Previous club	Notes	Ref
December 17, 2002	(United States) Ryan Coiner	FW	(United States) San Diego Toreros (United States) Orange County Blue Star	A-League College Player Draft, 1st round	

== Notes ==
- ^ ^{a} ^{b} The United Soccer Leagues took over operations of the Calgary Storm following financial troubles by the ownership group and the team finished the season as Team Calgary.
- On February 14, it was announced that a tentative deal had been reached with the City of Portland in which Portland Family Entertainment (PFE) would be dissolved and a new group, Metropolitan Sports (a subset of PFE investors), would take over ownership of the Timbers and the Portland Beavers baseball club. The Timbers referred to Metropolitan Sports as the owner throughout much of the 2003 season. However, Metropolitan Sports was not able to secure the required funding and the deal was never completed.
