= Heinzen =

Heinzen may refer to:

== People ==
- Aaron Heinzen (born 1979), American soccer player.
- Karl Heinzen (1809-1880), German-American author.
- Raymond F. Heinzen, American politician.
