= Calgary Cardinals =

- (1977–1978); Calgary, Alberta

Minor league affiliations
- Previous classes: Rookie League
- Previous leagues: Pioneer League

Major league affiliations
- Previous teams: St. Louis Cardinals (1977–78)

Team data
- Previous parks: Foothills Stadium

The Calgary Cardinals were a minor league baseball team located in the Canadian city of Calgary, Alberta, in 1977 and 1978. The team was a member of the Pioneer League, playing at the Rookie League level, and affiliated with the St. Louis Cardinals of Major League Baseball (MLB).

The Cardinals and the Medicine Hat A's were Pioneer League expansion teams in 1977. Calgary changed affiliations to the Montreal Expos in 1979, and the team became the Calgary Expos.

== Notable alumni ==
- Barry Cheesman (1977)
- Jim Gott (1977)

== Season records ==
Season	Manager	W–L	Win %	Finish	Playoffs	Ref
1977	Johnny Lewis	34–36	.486	4th	none	
1978	Johnny Lewis	37–32	.536	3rd	none	

== All-stars ==
Season	Name & Position
1977	Tye Waller, 3B; LeRoy Grossini, SS
1978	Dennis Delany, C Axel Vegas, P

== See also ==
- Calgary Cardinals players
