= Crossfire Premier SC =

American youth soccer organization

Crossfire Premier Soccer Club (formerly Crossfire Sounders) is a non-profit, youth soccer organization based in Redmond, WA affiliated with the Lake Washington Youth Soccer Association. Originally founded in 2000, the club has since become nationally recognized with boys and girls teams competing in the Elite Clubs National League, winning several national titles. The club is also affiliated with Crossfire Redmond, a semi-professional team that plays in the National Premier Soccer League.

The current Coaching Director is Bernie James who has served as director for over 20 years. Recently however, after an investigation into allegations of racial and sexual harassment, James had his license suspended by U.S. Soccer and his status is uncertain at this time while the investigation by U.S. Soccer continues.

== Notable players ==
Some notable former players of the club that have gone on to play NCAA Division I soccer or professionally (domestic or international) include:

- DeAndre Yedlin
- Ellis McLoughlin
- Nick Downing
- Preston Zimmerman
- Hassani Dotson
- Ethan Bartlow
- Kelyn Rowe
- Snyder Brunell

== Solidarity Payments ==
Crossfire Premier gained national attention when it brought a petition before FIFA's Dispute Resolution Center arguing that the club is entitled to collect solidarity payments for its contributions to Yedlin's development. Ultimately the panel ruled against Crossfire's claim though not for its merits, saying instead that the USSF claimed at the time that solidarity payments were illegal in the United States.

Later, MLS announced that it would begin enforcing solidarity payments for its youth academies when players go on to sign a professional contract

== History ==
Prior to the club's founding, Alan Hinton coached the original Crossfire Sounders U13 boys team in 1992 until 1997, winning four state championships and reaching the regional semifinals twice. It was while coaching Crossfire that Neil Farnsworth, a top executive with Microsoft and player's parent, discussed with Hinton the idea of reviving the Seattle Sounders professional team, which he coached for their first two years. Shortly after coaching the Crossfire Sounders boys, Crossfire Premier was founded and Hinton became their first Advanced Development Program Coaching Director. He was succeeded as Coaching Director first by Jimmy Gabriel then later by Bernie James who has served as director for over 20 years.
