= Calgary Cannons =

Canadian minor league baseball team

- 1985–2002; Calgary, Alberta
Team logo
Cap insignia

Minor league affiliations
- Class: Class AAA
- League: Pacific Coast League

Major league affiliations
- Team: Florida Marlins (1999–2002); Chicago White Sox (1998); Pittsburgh Pirates (1995–1997); Seattle Mariners (1985–1994)

Minor league titles
- League titles (1): 1998
- Division titles (3): 1987; 1991; 1998

Team data
- Colors: Navy blue, red, old gold, white (1998-2002); Royal blue, red, white (1992-1997) Red, gold, royal blue, white (1987-1992) Red, gold, white (1985-1987)
- Mascot: Wabash
- Ballpark: Foothills Stadium

The Calgary Cannons were a minor league baseball team located in Calgary, Alberta, for 18 seasons, from 1985 until 2002. They were a member of the AAA Pacific Coast League (PCL) and played at Foothills Stadium. The Cannons displaced the Calgary Expos, who played in the rookie level Pioneer League from 1977 until 1984. The team was previously known as the Salt Lake City Gulls before being relocated to Calgary. Following the 2002 season, the team moved to Albuquerque, New Mexico, where they became the Isotopes.

The Cannons played 2,538 regular season games in Calgary, compiling a record of 1,225–1,308. They qualified for the playoffs five times: 1985, 1987, 1989, and 1991 as an affiliate of the Seattle Mariners, and 1998 as an affiliate of the Chicago White Sox. They reached the PCL Championship Series three times, in 1987, 1991, and 1998, though they never won a title.

More than 400 Major League players wore a Cannons jersey, including Alex Rodriguez, Edgar Martínez, Danny Tartabull, and Jim Abbott. Two players pitched no-hitters with the Cannons: Frank Wills in 1985, and Erik Hanson in 1988. In 1985, Tartabull led all professional baseball players with 43 home runs.

== History ==
Russ Parker had operated a rookie-level Pioneer League team, the Calgary Expos, since 1977. In 1983, the opportunity to move up to AAA presented itself when the Salt Lake City Gulls were put up for sale. In December 1983, Parker purchased an option to buy the Gulls with the intention of moving the team to Calgary for the 1985 season. The Pacific Coast League approved the sale in May 1984, and reconstruction of Foothills Stadium began. More than 500 names were submitted in a name the team contest. Five finalists were selected: Stallions, Outlaws, Stetsons, Chinooks, and Cannons. The Cannons name was selected by a panel of local media representatives. The name was unique, as at the time, no professional or collegiate team in North America used the name.

=== AAA arrives in Calgary ===
The Cannons began play in 1985 as the AAA affiliate of the Seattle Mariners. Their first game was played April 11, 1985, against the Phoenix Giants. The Cannons won 6–2, led by Danny Tartabull's home run, the first in Cannons history. Following a 6–2 opening road-trip, Calgary's home opener was scheduled for April 19. It was snowed out, however, as were attempts to play the following two days. On their fourth attempt, the Cannons finally played their first home game on April 22 against the Tucson Toros. Parker threw the ceremonial first pitch out to Calgary's mayor, Ralph Klein. Led by Mickey Brantley's four-hit game, the Cannons won 7–6 to send the crowd of 4,313 who braved the near-freezing temperatures home happy.

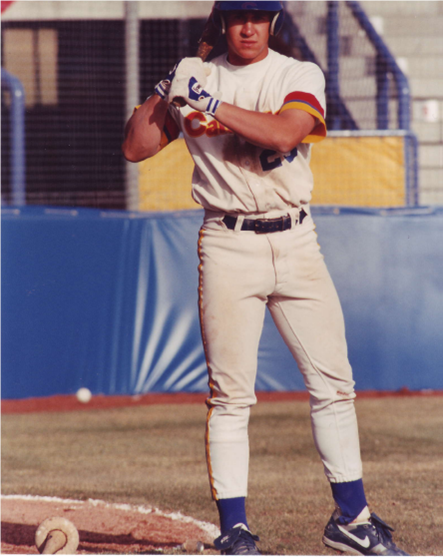
Bret Boone in 1992

The Cannons were a success at the gate, drawing 272,322 fans in 63 openings. The season was also a success on the field. The Cannons won the first half pennant in the North Division with a 37–32 record, earning a trip to the playoffs. The Cannons entered the North Division playoff series against the Vancouver Canadians without Tartabull, however, as he was recalled by the Mariners before the first game of the series. Tartabull's loss was significant, as he led all of professional baseball with 43 home runs. Calgary lost the best-of-five series to Vancouver in three games.

The first no-hitter by a Cannons pitcher was hurled by Frank Wills on May 31, 1985, against the Tacoma Tigers in a seven-inning game. Three years later, Erik Hanson pitched the second no-hitter in Cannons history on August 21, 1988, posting a 5–0 victory over the Las Vegas Stars. Hanson walked only one batter in the seven-inning game.

=== Pennant chases ===
Calgary again made the playoffs in 1987, finishing atop the North Division second half standings with a record of 46–25. The Cannons' overall record of 84–57 would ultimately stand as the best record the team compiled in Calgary. The Cannons lost the first two games of the Northern Division Championship Series against the Tacoma Tigers on the road before returning to Calgary to sweep the final three games of the series. Parker described the game five victory as "the biggest moment in Calgary baseball history." The Cannons faced the Albuquerque Dukes in the Pacific Coast League Championship Series. After splitting the first two games in Calgary, the Cannons dropped the next two in Albuquerque as the Dukes won their fourth PCL championship in ten years.

The Cannons made their third playoff appearance in five years in 1989 by winning the second-half pennant with a record of 42–29. The record represented a worst-to-first result for Calgary, as the club finished last in the PCL North in the first half with a 28–43 record. The Guns faced the Vancouver Canadians in a rematch of the 1985 North Division Final. As in 1985, Vancouver swept Calgary in three games.

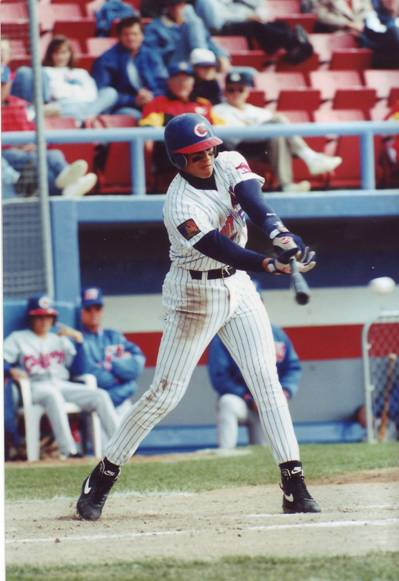
Alex Rodriguez in 1994

The 1991 season marked the fourth playoff appearance for the Cannons, who posted a 45–24 record in the second half. The Cannons swept the Portland Beavers in three games to claim the second Northern Division pennant in franchise history. They also won their first playoff road-games in team history in setting up a championship clash with the Tucson Toros. Calgary won the first two games of the best-of-five series at home over Tucson, giving them three chances to win the title. The Cannons, however, dropped the final three games in Tucson, losing the title in the process. In the fifth game, the Cannons were forced to start Dennis Powell on two days' rest after the Mariners unexpectedly recalled intended starter Dave Fleming prior to the game. The move left Russ Parker "upset" and "dumbfounded". The relationship between the Mariners and Cannons was never the same.

=== 1990s ===
In 1993, Calgary's Foothills Stadium was identified by the National Association of Professional Baseball Leagues as one of several minor league facilities requiring renovations to meet new standards. The Cannons were given a deadline of April 1, 1995, to complete renovations, or the team would be forced to relocate. The Cannons and the City of Calgary engaged in a protracted battle over who would pay for the improvements. Renovations finally began in fall 1994 and were completed on time for the next season.

The 1994 season saw the brief appearance of Alex Rodriguez in a Cannons uniform. The first-overall draft pick of the Mariners in 1993, Rodriguez vaulted through the Mariners organization in 1994, starting with the Appleton Foxes in Class A, then the AA Jacksonville Suns. Rodriguez was then promoted to the Mariners, playing 17 major league games before being optioned to Calgary to complete the season.

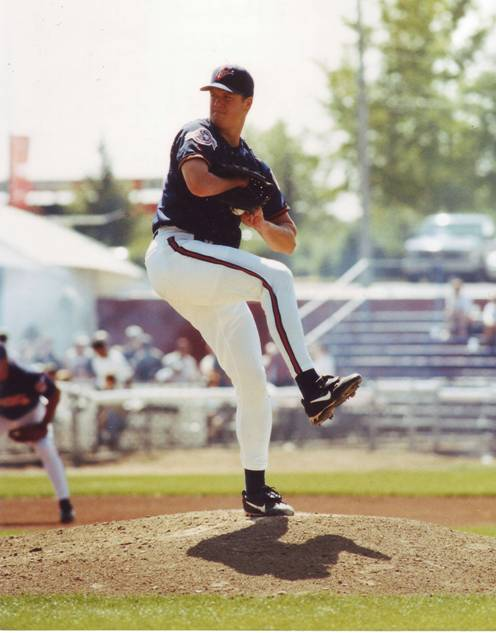
Jim Abbott in 1998

Following the 1994 season, the Cannons and Mariners parted ways, as Seattle moved its AAA team to nearby Tacoma. The Cannons signed an affiliation agreement with the Pittsburgh Pirates, which lasted for three seasons. In 1998, the Cannons became the AAA affiliate of the Chicago White Sox.

The 1998 Cannons qualified for the playoffs for the first time in seven seasons, doing so in dramatic fashion. Calgary clinched its third North Division pennant on September 3, 1998, defeating the Canadians 4–3 when Kevin Roberson hit a pinch-hit, two-run home run in the bottom of the ninth inning. The victory was the Cannons' 11th straight, and occurred before a crowd of 8,976, both franchise records. In the playoffs, the Cannons defeated the Fresno Grizzlies in five games to win the Pacific Conference championship, earning their third trip to the PCL Championship Series in team history. After dropping the first game of the final at home to the New Orleans Zephyrs, Calgary rebounded with 12–8 and 5–2 wins, the latter in New Orleans, to move within one game of winning the title. However, as in 1991, the Cannons were unable to clinch the title, falling 8–1 and 4–3 in New Orleans as the Zephyrs won the championship.

After the season, the Cannons switched major league teams for a final time, and became the Florida Marlins' affiliate for the final four years in Calgary.

=== Relocation ===
Citing six years of financial losses, Parker signed a letter of intent to sell the Cannons to a group from Albuquerque, New Mexico, in January 2001. It was not the first time Parker had considered such a sale. He backed out of a similar sale to a Portland, Oregon– based group at the last minute in 1999. The sale, which would see the team play in Calgary in 2001, then relocate to Albuquerque for the 2002 season, was contingent on voters in New Mexico supporting a referendum to pay for a new ballpark.

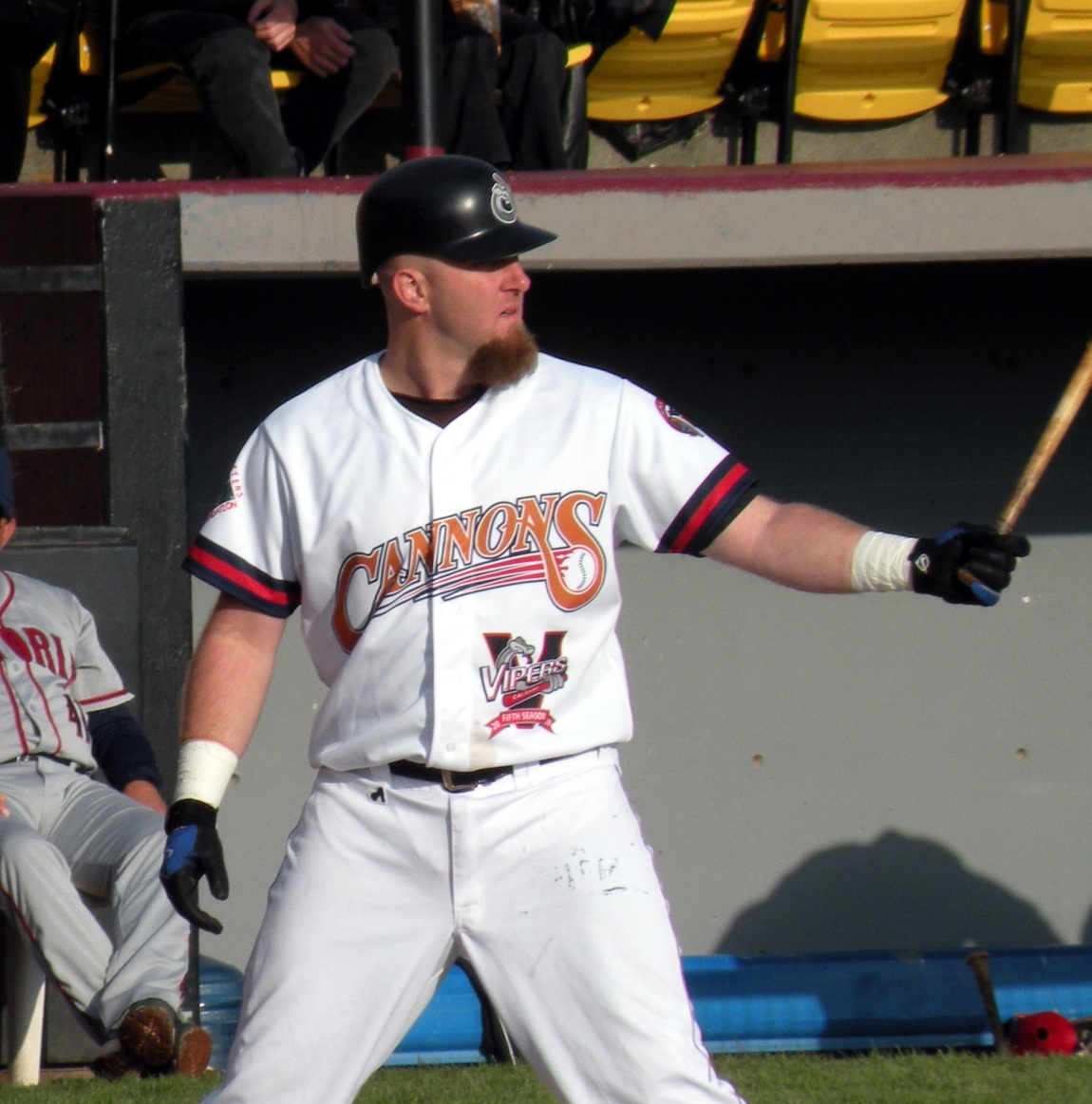
The Calgary Vipers honoured the Cannons' history with a throwback jersey night in 2009.

Parker argued that the Cannons no longer made economic sense in Calgary. Foothills Stadium was badly outdated. The Canadian dollar was at record lows against the American dollar, placing the team at a disadvantage in a league that was American-based. Poor weather was also blamed, especially early in the season, leading to lower attendance. The new ballpark in Albuquerque was approved; however, construction delays pushed the relocation of the team back a year. The Cannons 18th, and final, season took place in 2002.

The Cannons' final game was played on September 2, 2002, against the Edmonton Trappers. It ended in a wild 14–13 victory over Calgary's provincial rival before a sellout crowd of 8,512. The Cannons scored four runs in the bottom of the ninth inning to win the game, with the winning run scored on a strikeout/wild pitch. The team left the field to the song "Happy Trails" while the cannon in right field that had been fired every time a Calgary player hit a home run fired off a 21-gun salute.

The team began play as the Albuquerque Isotopes in 2003, named after a Simpsons episode where Homer Simpson attempted to prevent the Springfield Isotopes from relocating to Albuquerque. In Calgary, two new teams began play at Foothills Stadium. The Calgary Outlaws of the independent Canadian Baseball League lasted only a half-season before the entire league folded. The Calgary Dawgs of the Western Major Baseball League operated as a college summer league team. The Calgary Vipers of the independent North American League was the most recent team to represent Calgary, but folded at the end of the 2011 season.

== All-time record ==
	First Half		Second Half		Overall		
Season	W–L	Finish	W–L	Finish	W–L	Win%	Playoffs
1985	37–32	1st	34–38	4th	71–70	.504	Lost North Division final (0–3 to Vancouver)
1986	36–35	2nd	30–42	5th	66–77	.462	
1987	38–32	2nd	46–25	1st	84–57	.596	Won North Division final (3–2 over Tacoma); Lost Championship Series (1–3 to Albuquerque)
1988	33–38	3rd	35–36	3rd	68–74	.479	
1989	28–43	5th	42–29	1st	70–72	.493	Lost North Division final (0–3 to Vancouver)
1990	37–33	3rd	29–42	5th	66–75	.468	
1991	27–40	4th	45–24	1st	72–64	.529	Won North Division final (3–0 over Portland); Lost Championship Series (2–3 to Tucson)
1992	28–41	4th	32–37	4th	60–78	.435	
1993	34–36	3rd	34–36	4th	68–72	.486	
1994	34–37	5th	37–35	2nd	71–72	.497	
1995	30–41	5th	28–42	5th	58–83	.411	
1996	37–34	4th	37–34	3rd	74–68	.521	
1997	29–38	5th	31–40	5th	60–78	.435	

Season	W–L	Finish	Win%	Playoffs
1998	81–62	1st	.566	Won Pacific Conference (3–2 over Fresno); Lost Championship Series (2–3 to New Orleans)
1999	57–82	—	.410	
2000	60–82	4th	.423	
2001	72–71	—	.503	
2002	67–71	3rd	.486	
Total	1225–1308	—	.484	Five playoff appearances

Note: the PCL abandoned the split-season format beginning in the 1998 season as the league expanded to 16 teams following the dissolution of the American Association.

== Cannons in the Major Leagues ==
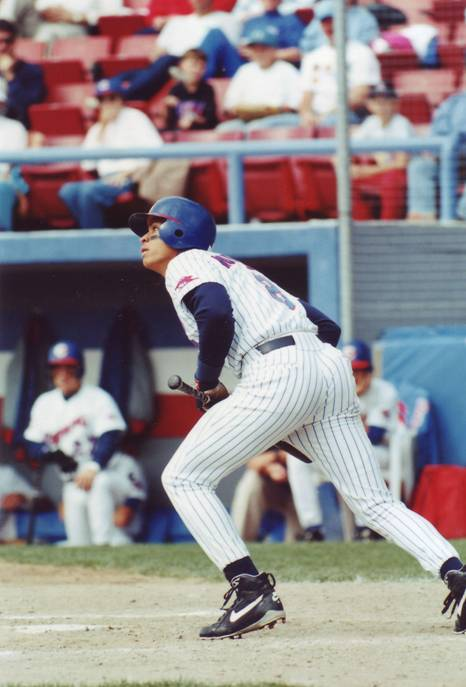
Alex Rodriguez played 32 games as a Cannon in 1994.

Over 400 Cannons players also played in the Major Leagues. Of them, the following players played at least parts of ten or more seasons at the Major League level.

- Jim Abbott
- Jim Acker
- Rich Amaral
- Scott Bankhead
- Danny Bautista
- José Bautista
- Bret Boone
- Chad Bradford
- Darren Bragg
- Jay Buhner
- Dave Burba
- A. J. Burnett
- Iván Calderón
- Luis Castillo
- Ramon Castro
- Jason Christiansen
- Darnell Coles
- Midre Cummings
- Ryan Dempster
- Elmer Dessens
- Mariano Duncan
- Mike Felder
- Cliff Floyd
- Ken Forsch
- Ryan Franklin
- Rene Gonzales
- Jason Grilli
- Ross Grimsley
- Lee Guetterman
- Eric Gunderson
- Bill Haselman
- Andy Hawkins
- Bob Howry
- Mike Kingery
- Derrek Lee
- Jon Lieber
- Esteban Loaiza
- Mike Lowell
- Ron Mahay
- Tino Martinez
- Edgar Martínez
- Larry Milbourne
- Kevin Millar
- Paul Mirabella
- Rich Monteleone
- Mike Morgan
- John Moses
- Tom Niedenfuer
- Edwin Núñez
- Keith Osik
- Scott Radinsky
- Joe Randa
- Mike Remlinger
- Harold Reynolds
- Alex Rodriguez
- Dave Schmidt
- Brian Shouse
- Matt Sinatro
- Luis Sojo
- Bill Swift
- Danny Tartabull
- Matt Treanor
- Steve Trout
- Dave Valle
- Omar Vizquel
- Jerome Walton
- Turner Ward
- John Wehner
- Rick White
- Preston Wilson
- Tony Womack
- Jason Wood
- Kevin Young

== Foothills Stadium ==
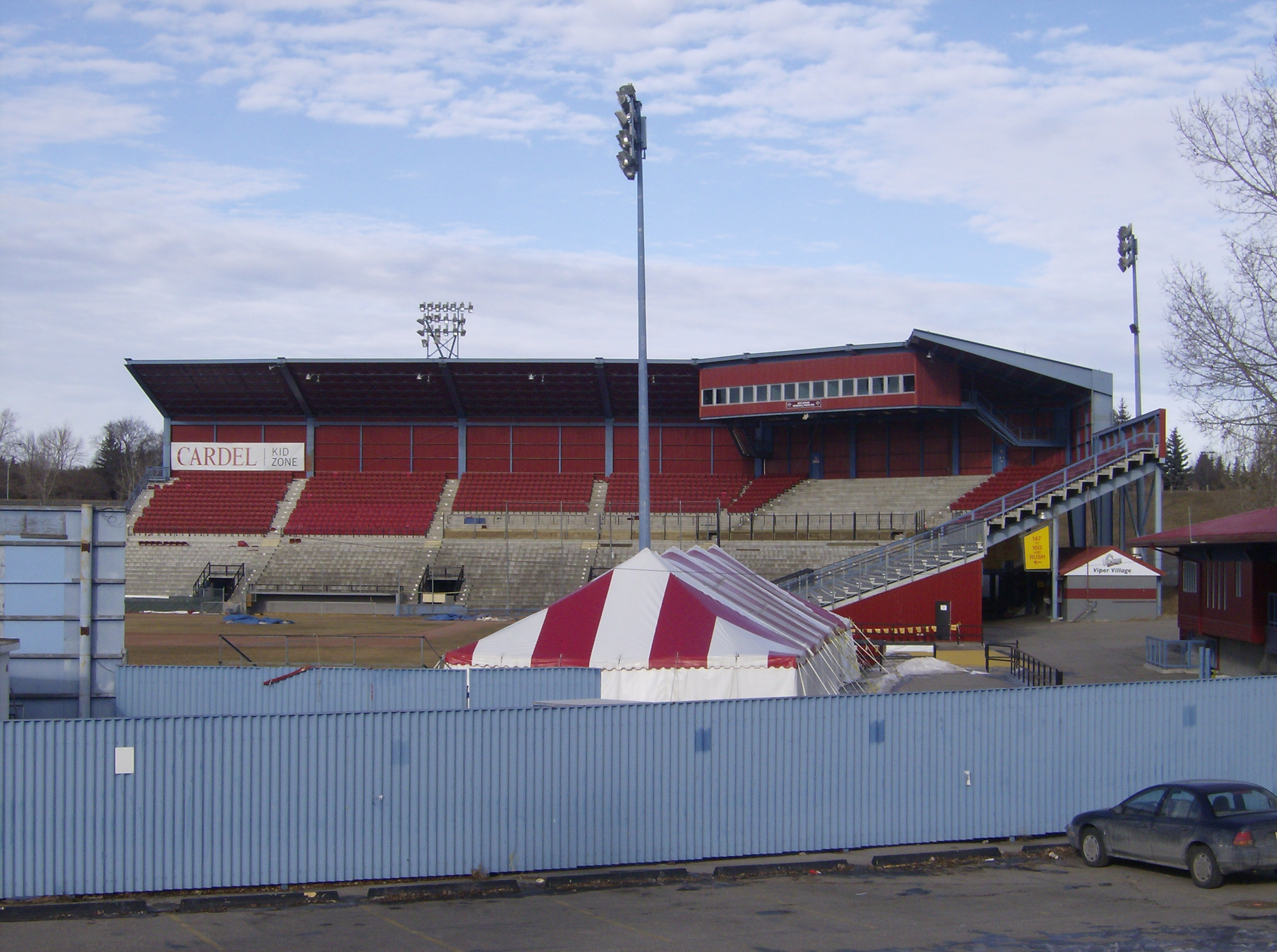
Foothills Stadium in 2007

The status of Foothills Stadium, formerly known as Burns Stadium, was a consistent story throughout the Cannons' history. The ballpark's owner, the City of Calgary, risked scuttling the move of the Gulls to Calgary by choosing to reassess the feasibility of AAA baseball in Calgary in 1984. Council ultimately voted to support Parker, agreeing to a seven-year lease and $1.5 million to renovate Foothills, one of the PCL's conditions on approving the relocation. In the Cannons' early years, Foothills was regarded as a park with good atmosphere. Mel Kowalchuck of the Edmonton Trappers described the park in 1988: "They provide a good atmosphere at the park. Seating's good, and so is the field. The lighting, concessions, parking ... everything's good."

Renovations to Foothills again became a major issue in 1993, when the National Association of Professional Baseball Leagues demanded that the Cannons upgrade Foothills to AAA standards. The Cannons and the city fought a protracted battle to see who would pay the majority of the $2 million renovation costs. The debate also included the Alberta government. Parker argued that if council did not choose to pay the majority of the renovation costs that he would sell or relocate the team. Groups representing Portland, Oregon; Fresno, and Sacramento, California; all expressed interest in the team. Unable to reach an agreement with the city, the Cannons then turned to the federal government in March 1994, making a pitch for a federal infrastructure grant to help pay for renovations. Renovations to Foothills Stadium finally began following the 1994 season.

As other teams built new ballparks throughout the 1990s, Foothills' lack of luxury boxes, small clubhouses, and open concourse became a growing concern for Parker. By 1998, he was arguing the need for a new stadium, or a major renovation of Foothills at a cost of $20 million. Despite numerous efforts to convince city council to help renovate Foothills, Parker was unable to secure support for the project. When the Cannons were sold and relocated in 2002, Foothills Stadium was regarded as one of the major reasons why the team moved south to Albuquerque.

== See also ==
- List of defunct baseball teams in Canada
