= Foothills Stadium =

Baseball stadium in Calgary, Alberta, Canada

Coordinates: 51°4′24.37″N 114°7′14.29″W

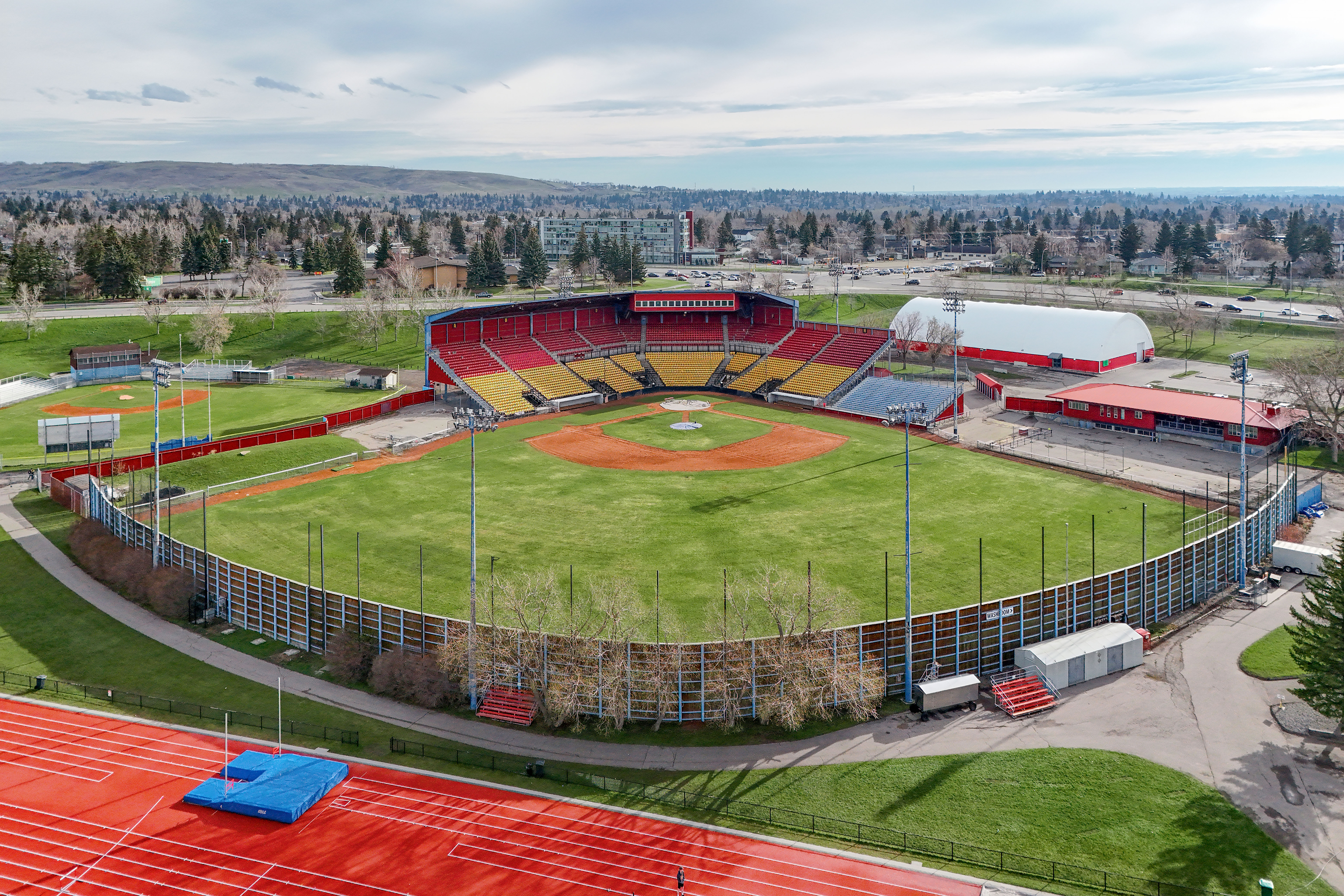
- Interactive map of Foothills Stadium
- Location: Calgary, Alberta
- Owner: City of Calgary
- Capacity: Baseball: 6,000
- Surface: Grass
- Field size: Left – 345 ft Centre – 400 ft Right – 345 ft

Construction
- Opened: 1966
- Renovated: 1985; 2004; 2007
- Closed: 2025

Tenants
- Calgary Dinos (CCBC) (2012–2024); Calgary Vipers (NAL) (2005–2011); Calgary Dawgs (WMBL) (2003–2005); Calgary Outlaws (CBL) (2003); Calgary Cannons (PCL) (1985–2002); Calgary Expos (PBL) (1979–1984); Calgary Cardinals (PBL) (1977–1978)

Foothills Stadium, formerly Burns Stadium, was a baseball stadium in Calgary, Alberta. It was primarily used for baseball, and was formerly home to the Calgary Cannons AAA baseball club until September 2002, when the team relocated to Albuquerque, New Mexico, USA. It was later the home field of the Calgary Vipers baseball team of the North American League. It originally opened in 1966. The most notable early team to play in the stadium was the Calgary Expos of the Pioneer League. The stadium had undergone several renovations, notably in 1985 prior to the arrival of the Calgary Cannons. Most recently the stadium was refurbished in 2004 including the installation of ViperVision Video Screen in right field. It held 6,000 people.

== History ==
The status of the stadium was a consistent story throughout the Cannons history. The ballpark's owner, the City of Calgary, risked scuttling the move of the Gulls to Calgary by choosing to reassess the feasibility of AAA baseball in Calgary in 1984. Council ultimately voted to support team owner Russ Parker, agreeing to a seven-year lease and $1.5 million to renovate Foothills, one of the PCL's conditions on approving the relocation. In the Cannons early years, Foothills was regarded as a park with good atmosphere. Mel Kowalchuck of the Edmonton Trappers described the park in 1988: "They provide a good atmosphere at the park. Seating's good, and so is the field. The lighting, concessions, parking ... everything's good."

Renovations to Foothills again became a major issue in 1993, when the National Association of Professional Baseball Leagues demanded that the Cannons upgrade Foothills to AAA standards. The Cannons and the city fought a protracted battle to see who would pay the majority of the $2 million renovation costs. The debate also included the Alberta government. Parker argued that if council did not choose to pay the majority of the renovation costs that he would sell or relocate the team. Groups representing Portland, Oregon, Fresno and Sacramento, California all expressed interest in the team. Unable to reach an agreement with the city, the Cannons then turned to the federal government in March 1994, making a pitch for a federal infrastructure grant to help pay for renovations. Renovations to Foothills Stadium finally began following the 1994 season.

As other teams built new ballparks throughout the 1990s, Foothills' lack of luxury boxes, small clubhouses and open concourse became a growing concern for Parker. By 1998, he was arguing the need for a new stadium, or a major renovation of Foothills at a cost of $20 million. Despite numerous efforts to convince city council to help renovate Foothills, Parker was unable to secure support for the project. When the Cannons were sold and relocated in 2002, Foothills Stadium was regarded as one of the major reasons why the team moved south to Albuquerque.

With the Calgary Vipers folding, the stadium was then used by the University of Calgary Dinos baseball team, as well the Calgary Junior Dinos, Calgary PBF Redbirds and Babe Ruth Calgary.

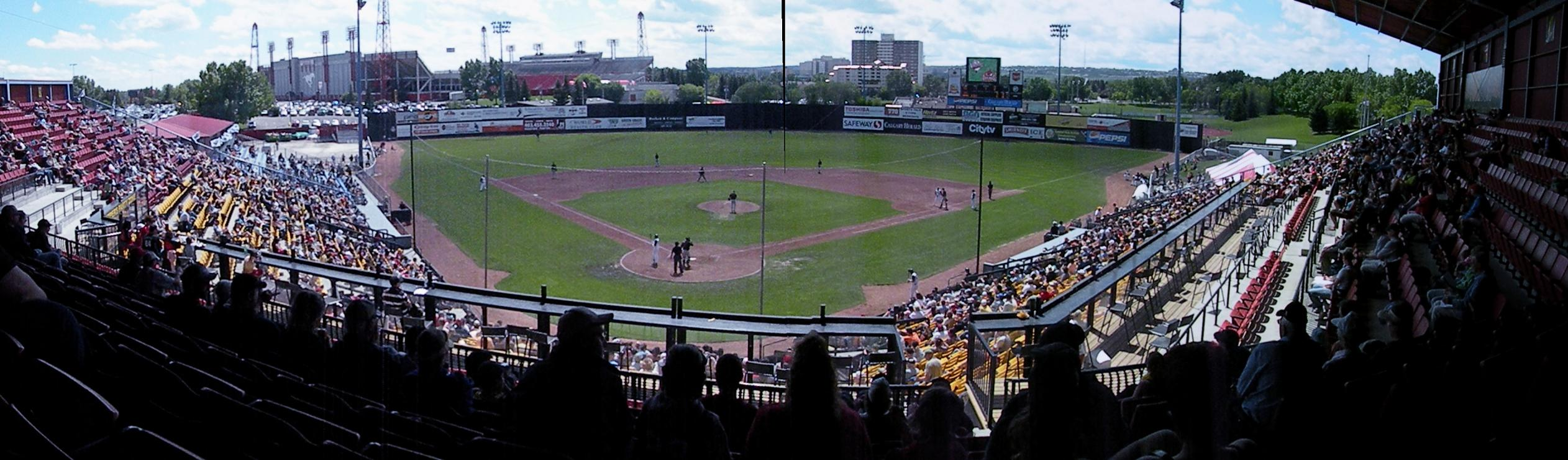
Foothills Stadium during a Calgary Vipers game

== Future ==
Demolition of Foothills Stadium began in February 2025 and is slated to be completed in April of that year. The baseball diamond will remain usable after the stadium's removal. The site is part of the City of Calgary’s master plan to redevelop Foothills Athletic Park which includes building a new multi-sport fieldhouse.

Preceded by First stadium	Home of the Calgary Dawgs; 2003–2005	Succeeded by Seaman Stadium
