= Shawn Saunders =

American soccer player

Shawn Saunder
Personal information
- Date of birth: June 28, 1976 (age 50)
- Place of birth: Lake Forest, California, U.S.
- Height: 5 ft 8 in (1.73 m)
- Position: Defender

Youth career
- 1995–1996: Fresno State Bulldogs

Senior career*
Years	Team	Apps	(Gls)
1997	Colorado Foxes	11	(0)
1998–2000	Orange County Zodiac	65	(0)
2002–2003	Orange County Blue Star	15	(1)
2004–2005	Portland Timbers	19	(0)
2006–2007	Orange County Blue Star	17	(0)
Total		127	(1)
- * Club domestic league appearances and goals

Shawn Saunders is an American retired soccer defender who played professionally in the USL A-League.

The brother of Josh Saunders, Shawn Saunders attended Woodbridge High School and Santa Margarita High School. He graduated from Santa Margarita in 1995 and attended Fresno State University. He played two seasons with Fresno State before turning professional in 1997 with the Colorado Foxes of the USISL A-League. In February 1998, Saunders signed with the Orange County Zodiac. He played for Orange County through the 2000 season. Saunders then moved to Germany to play. In 2002, he returned to the United States to complete his degree. He also rejoined Orange County, now known as the Orange County Blue Stars. In 2004, Saunders signed with the Portland Timbers where he joined his brother Josh. The Timbers released him in June 2005. Saunders returned to Orange County for the 2006 and 2007 seasons.
