= Nick Downing =

American soccer player

Personal information
- Full name: Nick Scott Downing
- Date of birth: January 25, 1980 (age 46)
- Place of birth: Redmond, Washington, U.S.
- Height: 5 ft 9 in (1.75 m)
- Position: Defender

Youth career
- 1998–2001: Maryland Terrapins

Senior career*
Years	Team	Apps	(Gls)
- Seattle Sounders Select
2001–2003	New England Revolution	17	(0)
2003	→ Portland Timbers (loan)	26	(0)
2004	Charleston Battery	19	(0)
Total		62	(0)

International career
1997	United States U-17	29	(1)
1999	United States U-20	22	(1)
- * Club domestic league appearances and goals

Nick Downing (born January 25, 1980) is an American retired professional soccer player who is currently the strength and conditioning coach for New England Revolution in Major League Soccer.

== Biography ==
=== Early career ===
The son of Jim and Linda Downing, Nick played soccer locally for Crossfire Sounders and Eastlake High School. As a teenager, Downing had stints training with German clubs Bayern Munich and VfB Stuttgart. Downing made 29 appearances and scored one goal with US U-17 national soccer team, including captaining the team at the 1997 FIFA U-17 World Championship in Egypt. Afterwards, he was named the 1998 Gatorade Player of the Year.

=== College ===
As a freshman, Downing played in 23 matches and was named to Soccer America's All-Freshman team. In his second season, he was a second-team All South Atlantic Regions selection. In 1999 Downing was a Hermann Trophy and Missouri Athletic Club award finalist. During his junior year, Downing announced his decision to forgo his final year of NCAA eligibility and enter the MLS SuperDraft.

=== Major League Soccer ===
In 2001, Downing was signed to a Project-40 contract. Selected in the second round of the 2001 MLS SuperDraft, Downing made only five league appearances for New England Revolution. The next season Downing saw the pitch twelve times. In 2003, Downing did not make any first team appearances, was loaned to Portland and was later released.

After being released from his MLS contract, Downing signed with Charleston Battery.

=== Coaching ===
Downing joined New England Revolution in January 2012 as the club's first ever strength and conditioning coach.

== Honors ==
New England Revolution

- MLS Eastern Conference: 2002

== Statistics ==
Club performance			League		Cup		League Cup		Continental		Total	
Season	Club	League	Apps	Goals	Apps	Goals	Apps	Goals	Apps	Goals	Apps	Goals
USA			League		Open Cup		League Cup		North America		Total	
2001	New England Revolution	MLS	5	0	2	0	0	0	0	0	7	0
2002	New England Revolution	MLS	12	0	0	0	0	0	0	0	12	0
2003	New England Revolution	MLS	0	0	0	0	0	0	0	0	0	0
2003	Portland Timbers (loan)	A-League	26	0	0	0	0	0	0	0	26	0
2004	Charleston Battery	A-League	19	0	0	0	0	0	0	0	19	0
Career total			62	0	2	0	0	0	0	0	64	0
