= Alex Bengard =

American soccer player (born 1979)

Personal information
- Full name: Alexander Bengard
- Date of birth: March 13, 1979 (age 47)
- Place of birth: Chino Hills, California, U.S.
- Height: 6 ft 0 in (1.83 m)
- Position: Midfielder

Youth career
- 1997: Mt. San Antonio Mounties
- 1998–2000: Dominguez Hills Toros

Senior career*
Years	Team	Apps	(Gls)
2001–2002	Los Angeles Galaxy	7	(0)
2003	Seattle Sounders	23	(3)
2004	Portland Timbers	24	(5)
2007	Los Angeles Storm	9	(1)
2008	Hollywood United		
- * Club domestic league appearances and goals as of 6 April 2009

Alex Bengard (born March 13, 1979) is an American retired soccer player.

== Career ==
=== College ===
Bengard played one year of college soccer at Mt. San Antonio College before transferring to California State University, Dominguez Hills. During his senior year Bengard broke the CSUDH single-season points record and earned the CCAA First Team All-Conference award, was named a First Team All-American, and won the Division 2 NCAA National Championship.

=== Professional ===
Bengard was drafted in the fifth round (57th overall) in the 2001 MLS SuperDraft by Los Angeles Galaxy. He played in 7 MLS games for Galaxy in his two years with the team, winning the 2001 U.S. Open Cup and the 2002 MLS Cup, before being waived at the end of the 2002 season.

Bengard dropped down a level to play in the USL First Division, with Seattle Sounders in 2003 and with Portland Timbers in 2004. After briefly playing with Toronto FC's reserves in 2007, Bengard returned to Southern California to work as a coach for local youth soccer organization Legends FC. He also played with Legends' USL Premier Development League team Los Angeles Storm in 2007.

In addition to his coaching work, Bengard also occasionally plays with the amateur Hollywood United, which plays in the Los Angeles-based USASA-affiliated Coast Soccer League. Bengard was part of the Hollywood team which beat Portland Timbers 3–2 in the first round of the 2008 Lamar Hunt U.S. Open Cup.
