= Curtis Spiteri =

American soccer player

Personal information
- Date of birth: 15 March 1981 (age 45)
- Place of birth: United States
- Position: Goalkeeper

Senior career*
Years	Team	Apps	(Gls)
2003	Chicago Fire	1	(0)
2003	Portland Timbers	10	(0)
- * Club domestic league appearances and goals

Curtis Spiteri (born 15 March 1981 in the United States) is an American retired soccer player. Spiteri played for the Chicago Fire and the Portland Timbers.
