= Calgary Expos =

- 1977–1984; Calgary, Alberta

Minor league affiliations
- Class: Rookie League
- League: Pioneer League

Major league affiliations
- Previous teams: Montreal Expos (1979–1984); St. Louis Cardinals (1977–1978)

Team data
- Previous names: Calgary Cardinals (1977–1978)

The Calgary Expos were a minor league baseball team located in the Canadian city of Calgary, Alberta, from 1979 to 1984. The team was a member of the Pioneer League, playing at the Rookie League level.

Calgary and the Medicine Hat A's had joined the Pioneer League as expansion teams in 1977. At the time, Calgary was affiliated with the St. Louis Cardinals, and the team was the Calgary Cardinals. Calgary picked up the Expos moniker in 1979, when they switched affiliations to the Montreal Expos. The Expos later relocated to Salt Lake City, Utah, to become the Salt Lake City Trappers in 1985 to make room for the Calgary Cannons of the Pacific Coast League.

== Notable alumni ==
- Bob Bailey (1979)
- Steve Boros (1980)
- Andres Galarraga (1979-1980) 5 x MLB All-Star; 1995 NL Batting Title

== Season-by-season results ==
Season	W–L	Finish	Win%
1979	34–36	2nd	.486
1980	23–46	3rd	.333
1981	46–24	1st	.657
1982	25–45	3rd	.357
1983	48–28	1st	.600
1984	28–42	4th	.400
Total	204–221	—	.480

== Playoffs ==
The Expos qualified for the playoffs twice, losing to the Butte Copper Kings 3–2 in the 1981 league championship series, and losing to the Billings Mustangs 3–1 in the 1983 series.

== See also ==
- Calgary Expos players
