= Lee Morrison (soccer) =

American soccer player

Personal information
- Full name: Lee Morrison
- Date of birth: November 8, 1979 (age 46)
- Place of birth: Carmichael, California, U.S.
- Height: 1.85 m (6 ft 1 in)
- Position: Defender

College career
Years	Team	Apps	(Gls)
1998–2001	Stanford Cardinal		

Senior career*
Years	Team	Apps	(Gls)
2002	Dallas Burn	3	(0)
2003–2007	Portland Timbers	113	(2)

International career^{‡}
- United States U18
1999	United States U20		
- * Club domestic league appearances and goals as of April 20, 2013 ‡ National team caps and goals as of April 20, 2013

Lee Morrison (born October 8, 1979) is an American retired soccer player who last played as a defender for the Portland Timbers in USL First Division.

== Club career ==
Morrison was picked by Dallas Burn in 2002 MLS SuperDraft from Stanford University.

In 2003, he signed with Portland Timbers, where he played for five seasons in USL First Division and A-League

== International career ==
Morrison was part of the United States U20 that participated in the 1999 FIFA World Youth Championship.
