= Josh Saunders =

Puerto Rican footballer (born 1981)

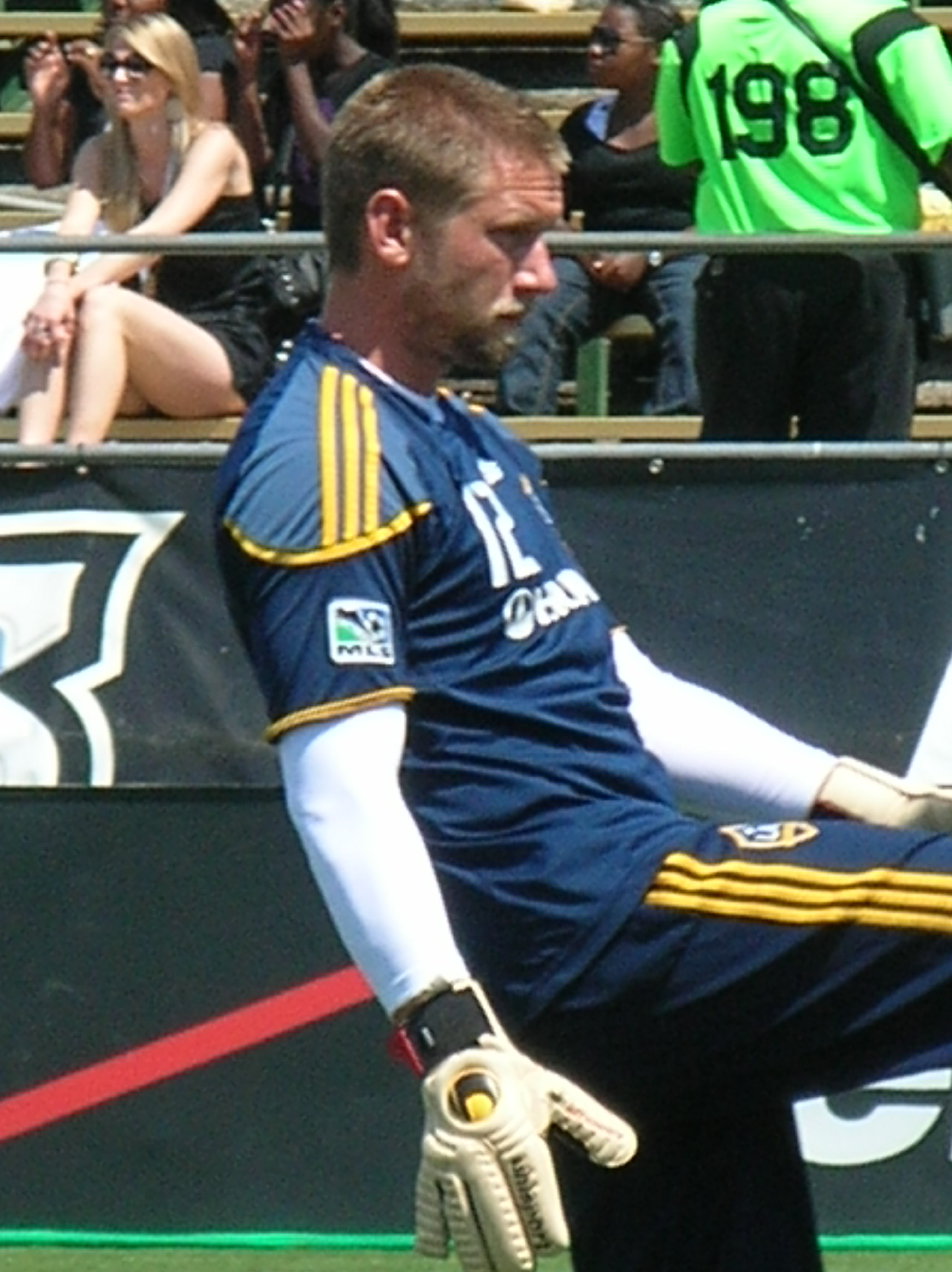
- Saunders with Los Angeles Galaxy in 2010

Personal information
- Date of birth: March 2, 1981 (age 45)
- Place of birth: Grants Pass, Oregon, U.S.
- Height: 6 ft 4 in (1.93 m)
- Position: Goalkeeper

College career
Years	Team	Apps	(Gls)
1999–2000	Cal State Fullerton Titans		
2001–2002	California Golden Bears		

Senior career*
Years	Team	Apps	(Gls)
2003	San Jose Earthquakes	0	(0)
2003	→ Portland Timbers (loan)	16	(0)
2004	Portland Timbers	24	(0)
2005–2006	Los Angeles Galaxy	0	(0)
2005–2006	→ Portland Timbers (loan)	50	(0)
2007	Puerto Rico Islanders	22	(0)
2008	Miami FC	27	(0)
2008	→ LA Galaxy (loan)	3	(0)
2009–2012	LA Galaxy	53	(0)
2013	Real Salt Lake	3	(0)
2014–2016	New York City	66	(0)
2014	→ San Antonio Scorpions (loan)	15	(0)
2017	Orlando City	0	(0)
2017	→ Orlando City B (loan)	1	(0)

International career
2002	United States U23	1	(0)
2008	Puerto Rico	2	(0)
- * Club domestic league appearances and goals

Josh Saunders (born March 2, 1981) is a former professional footballer who played as a goalkeeper in Major League Soccer. Born in the metropolitan United States, he represented Puerto Rico at international level.

== College career ==
Saunders, the younger brother of Shawn Saunders, spent the final two seasons of his collegiate career at Berkeley, after spending the previous two at California State University, Fullerton. He was named a First Team All-Pac-10 selection in each of his two seasons with the Golden Bears, and during his senior season he became the first keeper ever to be named Pac-10 Player of the Year. He has a B.A. in American studies.

== Professional career ==
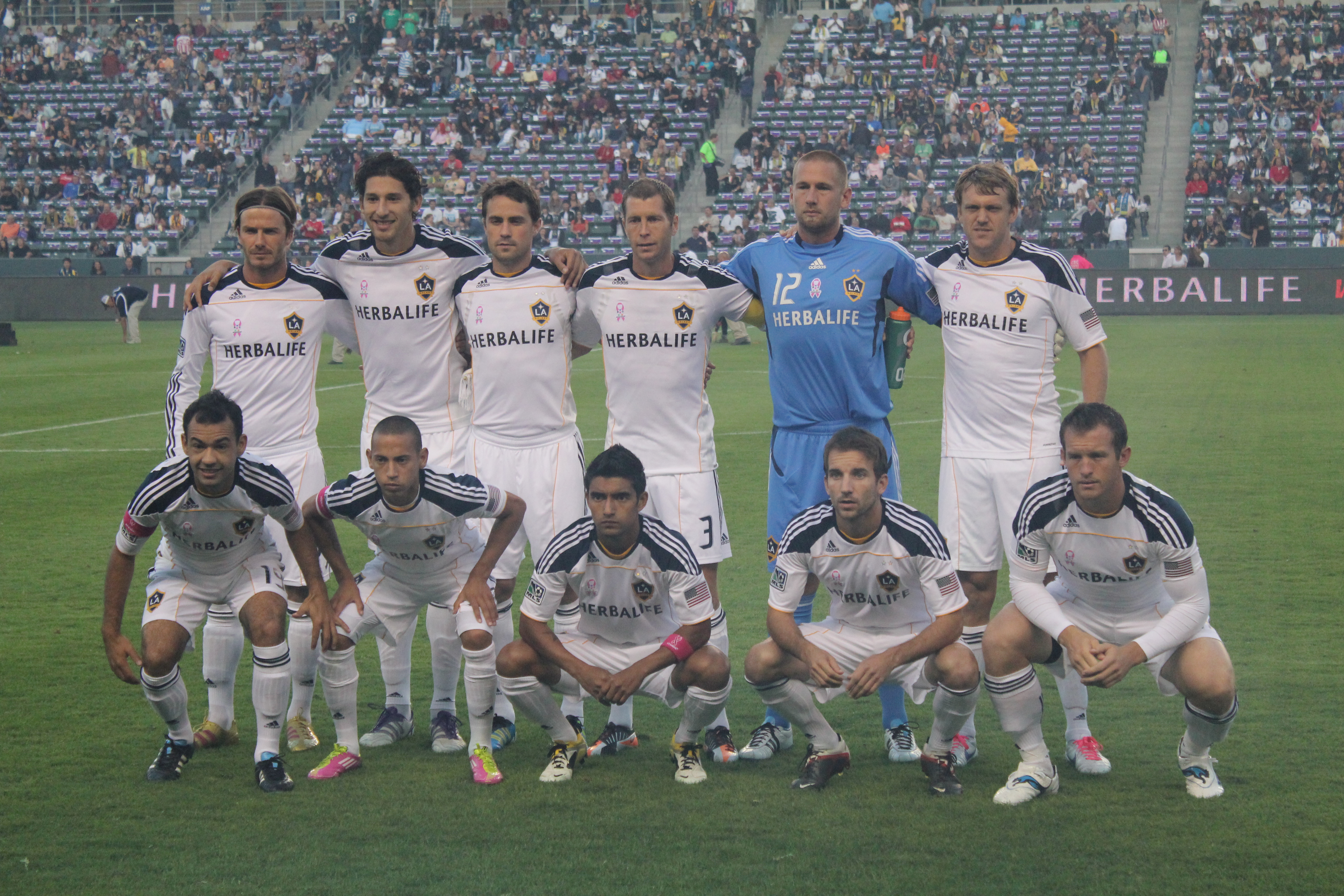
Saunders with Galaxy

After being selected in the fourth round of the 2003 MLS SuperDraft Saunders made the roster of the San Jose Earthquakes, but did not appear in an official match. Instead, Saunders played on loan with the Portland Timbers in the USL First Division, where he played every minute of his 16 games, allowing only 15 goals, giving him a 0.90 GAA for the 2003 season. The next year, he started 24 games and posted a 1.11 GAA with six shutouts. Chief among his feats was a 363-minute scoreless streak, which, until recently, was the longest in Timbers history.

Saunders joined Los Angeles Galaxy in 2005 as third-choice keeper behind Kevin Hartman and Steve Cronin, but again failed to appear in a first team game, logged only 15 minutes as a substitute in a game for the Galaxy's reserves. In 2007, Saunders and three other players were waived from the LA Galaxy. Some bloggers suspected this was due to the massive expense of acquiring soccer star David Beckham, and despite a successful pre-season trial with Chicago Fire, signed for the Puerto Rico Islanders for the 2007 season. He made his debut for the Islanders in a 2–1 victory over the Rochester Raging Rhinos on April 14, 2007.

On April 11, 2008, Saunders signed with Miami FC, and subsequently made 27 appearances for the Florida team, until he was loaned to Los Angeles Galaxy in September 2008 for the remainder of the MLS season. Saunders signed a permanent contract with Galaxy in early 2009, and was expected to serve as understudy to Donovan Ricketts.

On November 22, 2009, he came on in the 2nd half in relief of the injured Ricketts during the 2009 MLS Cup. Despite holding Real Salt Lake scoreless for the remaining 26 minutes of regulation and 30 minutes of extra time, Saunders was unable to guide the Galaxy to their 3rd MLS Cup title when he could stop only two of seven Salt Lake penalty attempts.

Saunders had an impressive season during 2011, putting in commanding performances in the Galaxy's goal in the absence of Ricketts, who was out for most of the season with a long-term injury. In 2012, he guided Galaxy to victory in MLS Cup 2012 helping the club win their 4th MLS Cup in history and first back-to-back championships.

On February 22, 2013, Saunders contract with Galaxy expired and it was not renewed due to the arrival of Carlo Cudicini. After requesting to join the preseason camp of Real Salt Lake, Saunders saw his first minutes with the Claret and Cobalt in a preseason win over the Galaxy. He was later signed as a backup for Nick Rimando. During Rimando's absences for the 2013 CONCACAF Gold Cup, Saunders made 2 starts, but tore his ACL on July 13 against FC Dallas and missed the rest of the season, and his option was declined following the season.

On July 10, 2014, it was confirmed that Saunders would sign for MLS expansion franchise New York City FC on a free transfer, joining the San Antonio Scorpions on loan until the end of 2014. It was also confirmed that he would join New York City's sister club Manchester City in their tour of Scotland.

Saunders was traded by NYCFC to Orlando City on January 27, 2017, in exchange for a fourth-round pick in the 2019 MLS SuperDraft. Saunders' contract option was not renewed by Orlando City following the 2017 season.

== International career ==
In 2008, Saunders made his debut with the Puerto Rican national team, and is now considered to have Puerto Rican sporting nationality. Prior to his international switch, Saunders made an appearance for the U.S. U-23 national team in 2002 against Canada.

== Career statistics ==
As of 13 November 2016

Appearances and goals by club, season and competition
Club	Season	League			League Cup		US Open Cup		North America		Total	
Club	Season	League	Apps	Goals	Apps	Goals	Apps	Goals	Apps	Goals	Apps	Goals
San Jose Earthquakes	2003	MLS	0	0	0	0	0	0	0	0	0	0
LA Galaxy	2005	MLS	0	0	0	0	0	0	—		0	0
LA Galaxy	2006	MLS	0	0	—		0	0	0	0	0	0
LA Galaxy	2008	MLS	3	0	—		0	0	—		3	0
LA Galaxy	2009	MLS	6	0	1	0	0	0	—		7	0
LA Galaxy	2010	MLS	1	0	0	0	2	0	1	0	4	0
LA Galaxy	2011	MLS	19	0	4	0	1	0	6	0	30	0
LA Galaxy	2012	MLS	27	0	6	0	0	0	3	0	36	0
LA Galaxy	Total		56	0	11	0	3	0	10	0	80	0
Real Salt Lake	2013	MLS	3	0	0	0	3	0	—		6	0
San Antonio Scorpions	2014	NASL	15	0	—		0	0	—		15	0
New York City FC	2015	MLS	33	0	—		0	0	—		33	0
New York City FC	2016	MLS	33	0	0	0	0	0	—		33	0
New York City FC	Total		66	0	0	0	0	0	0	0	66	0
Career total			140	0	11	0	12	0	10	0	173	0

== Honors ==
San Jose Earthquakes

- MLS Cup: 2003
- Major League Soccer Western Conference Championship: 2003

Portland Timbers (USL)

- USL A-League Commissioner's Cup: 2004

Los Angeles Galaxy

- MLS Cup: 2011, 2012
- Major League Soccer Supporters' Shield: 2010, 2011
- Major League Soccer Western Conference Championship: 2009, 2011, 2012

Real Salt Lake

- Major League Soccer Western Conference Championship: 2013

San Antonio Scorpions

- North American Soccer League Soccer Bowl: 2014

Individual

- NYCFC Etihad Player of the month: March 2015, April 2015, October 2015
