= Byron Alvarez =

Mexican footballer (born 1978)

Byron Álvarez
Personal information
- Date of birth: October 21, 1978 (age 48)
- Place of birth: Mexico City, Mexico
- Height: 5 ft 9 in (1.75 m)
- Position: Forward

Senior career*
Years	Team	Apps	(Gls)
1999	Yakima Reds		
1999–2000	La Piedad		
2000–2001	Tampico Madero		
- C.F. Ciudad Juárez
- Tampico Madero
2002	MetroStars	8	(0)
2003–2006	Portland Timbers	96	(41)
2004–2006	Chicago Storm (indoor)	45	(25)
2007	Charleston Battery	22	(8)
2007–2009	Monterrey La Raza (indoor)	42	(39)
2008	Portland Timbers	9	(1)
2010–2014	Missouri Comets (indoor)	82	(99)
2014–2015	Wichita B-52s (indoor)	15	(26)
- * Club domestic league appearances and goals as of 13 March 2019

Byron Álvarez (born October 21, 1978) is a Mexican former professional footballer who played as a forward. He was the 2010–2011 MISL Most Valuable Player.

== Early life ==
Alvarez began playing football at sixteen. He appeared with a string of minor league Mexican clubs including Reboceros de La Piedad, Jaiba Brava de Tamaulipas, Astros de Ciudad Juárez, and C.F. Tambico.

== Club career ==
In 2002, he signed with the MetroStars of Major League Soccer. In 2003, he moved to the Portland Timbers of the USL First Division. On September 29, 2004, the Chicago Storm of the Major Indoor Soccer League (MISL) traded Kevin Sakuda to the San Diego Sockers for the rights to Alvarez. On October 18, 2004, the Storm signed him on loan from the Timbers and he played the 2004–2005 and 2005–2006 indoor seasons in Chicago. Following the 2006 USL-1 season, Alvarez became a free agent and on April 3, 2007, signed with the Charleston Battery of USL-1. He played twenty-two games and scored eight goals. On July 9, 2007, the Monterrey La Raza of MISL selected Alvarez in the MISL expansion draft. The LaRaza went to the MISL championship series, but fell to the Baltimore Blast. Following the end of the indoor season, he contacted Gavin Wilkinson, coach of the Timbers, about the possibility of rejoining the Timbers. Alvarez signed with the Timbers on July 14, 2008. He played only nine games with the Timbers and returned to the LaRaza which was now playing in the newly created National Indoor Soccer League. On April 7, 2009, he was announced as the 2008-09 NISL Most Valuable Player.

Alvarez has also played for the Mexican national futsal team.

On October 25, 2010, The Missouri Comets announced they had signed Byron Alvarez to play in their first season back in the MISL. Alvarez was vital to the Comets run to the MISL playoffs, leading the team and the league in scoring with 80 points. Alvarez also led the league in goals scored (33), hat tricks (5) and tied for the league-lead in game-winning goals with five. Alvarez scored at least one point in 17 games this season and he also posted the longest goal-scoring streak of the year (nine games) and point-scoring streak (15 games). He capped off this great season by being named 2010–2011 MISL MVP.
