= Jake Sagare =

American former soccer player (born 1980)

Personal information
- Full name: Jacob Kent Sagare
- Date of birth: April 5, 1980 (age 46)
- Place of birth: Yakima, Washington, United States
- Height: 5 ft 10 in (1.78 m)
- Positions: Midfielder; forward

Team information
- Current team: Washington Rush (Coach)

Youth career
- 1998–2000: Washington Huskies

Senior career*
| Years | Team | Apps | (Gls) |
| 1998–2000 | Yakima Reds | | |
| 2001 | Seattle Sounders Select | 10 | (3) |
| 2002 | Portland Timbers | 27 | (5) |
| 2003 | Grimsby Town | 1 | (0) |
| 2003 | Portland Timbers | 20 | (4) |
| 2003–2004 | Halifax Town | 11 | (0) |
| 2004 | Portland Timbers | 25 | (1) |
| 2005 | Vancouver Whitecaps | 2 | (0) |
| 2005 | Yakima Reds | 1 | (0) |
| 2005–2006 | Seattle Sounders | 29 | (0) |
| 2008–2010 | Yakima Reds | 24 | (5) |
| Total | | 150 | (18) |
- * Club domestic league appearances and goals

Jacob Kent Sagare (born April 5, 1980, in Yakima, Washington) is an American former soccer player who is on the coaching staff of Washington Rush.

He has previously played in the English Football League for Grimsby Town and Halifax Town, as well as playing for Portland Timbers, Vancouver Whitecaps and Seattle Sounders.

== Playing career ==
=== College and amateur ===
Sagare is naturally a striker, but in recent seasons he has opted to play as a midfielder. As a youngster, Sagare played college soccer at the University of Washington and his home town club the Yakima Reds of the USISL. In 2001, he played for a select team in a game for the Seattle Sounders before getting his break with a move to join the Portland Timbers of the old A-League.

=== Professional ===
In 2003, Sagare was scouted by English club Grimsby Town, who at the time were playing in the First Division, the second tier of the English game. In February, he joined the Mariners from Portland on a free transfer after negotiating a short-term contract with player/manager Paul Groves; Jake needed no international clearance to play in England due to his dual nationality.

Sagare was signed as a striker and rarely featured in the first team with the club having such players as Michael Boulding, Steve Livingstone and Darren Mansaram contracted. On 26 April 2003, with Grimsby already relegated Sagare and other fringe players such as Graham Hockless were handed a chance, with this Sagare made his first and only senior appearance against Reading at the Madjeski Stadium.

At the end of the season, Sagare was not offered a new contract and released from the club. He briefly spent a week on trial with Chesterfield before returning to the States play for the Portland Timbers in the summer. However, in late September he returned to England to sign with Conference Premier side Halifax Town. He would go on to play in 11 games for The Shaymen before being released in May 2004.

On his return to the States, Sagare had a successful third spell with Portland Timbers, before going on to join the Vancouver Whitecaps briefly in 2005. He also notably had a decent two-year stay with the Seattle Sounders before returning to his home town club, Yakima Reds, to compete in the USL Premier Development League. He is also coach of the West Valley High School boys varsity soccer team.

== Coaching career ==
In 2011 Sagare became the director of coaching for the Sun City Strikers, and in February 2012 joined Washington Rush as a youth team coach.
