= Aaron Heinzen =

American soccer player

Personal information
- Full name: Aaron Heinzen
- Date of birth: August 9, 1979 (age 47)
- Place of birth: Yakima, Washington, U.S.
- Height: 1.78 m (5 ft 10 in)
- Position: Defender

Youth career
- 1998–2002: Washington Huskies

Senior career*
Years	Team	Apps	(Gls)
2001	Seattle Sounders Select		
2003–2005	Portland Timbers	50	(0)
Total		50+	(0+)
- * Club domestic league appearances and goals

Aaron Heinzen (born August 9, 1979) is an American former soccer player who played professionally for three seasons with Portland Timbers before being released in 2005. He now serves as the USL play-by-play commentator for Portland Timbers 2 home matches.
